= Hayakawa's S-F Magazine Reader's Award =

Japanese literary award

1968 December issue of SF Magazine (SFマガジン)

The Hayakawa's S-F Magazine Reader's Award (SFマガジン読者賞, Esuefu Magajin Dokusha Shō) is an annual poll conducted by Hayakawa's S-F Magazine for the best Japanese short story, illustrator, and foreign short story, voted by the readers from their issues in the previous year. The honor has been awarded since 1989.

== Award winners ==
=== Foreign Short Story ===
- Thomas M. Disch, "The Brave Little Toaster Goes to Mars" (Translator: Hisashi Asakura) (1989)
- Mike Resnick, "For I Have Touched the Sky" (Translator: Masayuki Uchida) (1990)
- John Varley, "Tango Charlie and Foxtrot Romeo" (Translator: Hisashi Asakura) (1991)
- John Morressy, "Timekeeper" (Translator: Youko Miki) (1992)
- James Tiptree, Jr. "With Delicate Mad Hands" (Translator: Norio Itou) (1993)
- Ted Chiang, "Understand" (Translator: Shigeyuki Kude) (1994)
- Greg Egan, "Learning to Be Me" (Translator: Makoto Yamagashi) (1995)
- Greg Bear, "Heads" (Translator: Kazuko Onoda) (1996)
- James Tiptree, Jr. "Come Live With Me" (Translator: Norio Itou) (1997)
- Greg Egan, "Wang's Carpet" (Translator: Makoto Yamagishi) (1998)
- Bruce Sterling, "Taklamakan" (Translator: Takashi Ogawa) (1999)
- Greg Egan, "Oceanic" (Translator: Makoto Yamagishi) (2000)
- Ted Chiang, "Story of Your Life" (Translator: Shigeyuki Kude) (2001)
- Ted Chiang, "Seventy-Two Letters" (Translator: Youichi Shimada) (2002)
- Greg Egan, "Mister Volition" (Translator: Makoto Yamagishi) (2003)
- Connie Willis, "The Last of the Winnebagos" (Translator: Ohmori Nozomi) (2004)
- Jeffrey Ford, "The Empire of Ice Cream" (Translator: Tomo Inoue) (2005)
- Bradley Denton, "Sergeant Chip" (Translator: Naoya Nakahara) (2006)
- Ian McDonald, "The Djinn's Wife" (Translator: Masaya Shimokusu) (2007)

=== Japanese Short Story ===
- Mariko Ōhara, "Aqua Planet" (1989)
- Shinji Kajio, "Jinii Ni Kansuru Oboegaki" (1990)
- Mariko Ōhara, "Ephemera" (1991)
- Goro Masaki, "Venus City" (1992)
- Hiroyuki Morioka, "Spice" (1993)
- Osamu Makino, "Mouse Trap" (1994)
- Masaki Yamada, "Dead Soldier's Live" (1995)
- Jin Kusagami, "Tokyo Kaika Ereki no Karakuri" (1996)
- Kōshū Tani, "Eriko" ^{1} (1997)
- Yasumi Kobayashi, "Umi o Miru Hito" (1998)
  - English translation: "The Man Who Watched the Sea" (Speculative Japan 2, Kurodahan Press, 2011)
- Hōsuke Nojiri, "Taiyō no Sandatsusha" (1999)
  - Later rewritten into the novel Usurper of the Sun (English translation was released by Haikasoru.)
- Masaya Fujita, "Kiseki no Ishi" (2000)
- Chōhei Kanbayashi, "Hadae no Shita" (2001)
- Mizuhito Akiyama, "Ore ha Missile" (2002)
- Issui Ogawa, "Rou Voles no Wakusei" (2003)
- Hiroshi Sakurazaka, "Saitama Chainsaw Shoujo" (2004)
  - English translation: "The Saitama Chain Saw Massacre" (Hanzai Japan, Haikasoru, 2015)
- Hiroshi Yamamoto, "Medousa no Jumon" (2005)
- Masaya Fujita, "Daafu no Shima" (2006)
- Keikaku Itō, "The Indifference Engine" (2007)

=== Illustrator ===
- Hiroyuki Katou & Keisuke Goto (1989)
- Mafuyu Hiroki (1990)
- Hiroyuki Katou & Keisuke Goto, Hitoshi Yoneda (tie) (1991)
- Mafuyu Hiroki (1992)
- Hiroyuki Katou & Keisuke Goto (1993)
- Keinojou Mizutama (1994)
- Jun Kosaka (1995)
- Hiroyuki Katou & Keisuke Goto (1996)
- Hikaru Tanaka (1997)
- Hikaru Tanaka (1998)
- Youkou Fujiwara (1999)
- Kenji Tsuruta (2000)
- Hikaru Tanaka (2001)
- Mikio Masuda (2002)
- Youkou Fujiwara (2003)
- Aya Takano (2004)
- Aya Takano (2005)
- Katsukame Hashi (2006)
- Kashima (2007)

== See also ==
- Seiun Award - Japanese Hugo Awards equivalent
- SF Ga Yomitai! (lit., We Want to Read SF!) - Japanese yearly book, which conducts an annual poll, edited by Hayakawa's S-F Magazine.
