= Theodore Sturgeon Award =

Science fiction literary award

Theodore Sturgeon Memorial Award
- Awarded for: The best short science fiction stories published in English in the prior calendar year
- Presented by: Center for the Study of Science Fiction
- First award: 1987; 39 years ago
- Most recent winner: Alex T. Singer ("We, the Fleet")
- Website: sfcenter.ku.edu/sturgeon-award

The Theodore Sturgeon Memorial Award is an annual literary award presented by the Theodore Sturgeon Literary Trust and the Center for the Study of Science Fiction at the University of Kansas to the author of the best short science fiction story published in English in the preceding calendar year. The award is named in honor of Theodore Sturgeon, one of the leading authors of the Golden Age of Science Fiction from 1939 to 1950. The award was established in 1987 by his heirs—including his widow, Jayne Sturgeon—and James Gunn, at the time the Director of the Center for the Study of Science Fiction.

Nominations are submitted by reviewers, fans, publishers, and editors, and are collated into a list of finalists to be voted on by the jury. The maximum eligible length that a work may be is not formally defined by the center. The award is given each year at the University of Kansas; it was previously presented at the Campbell Conference as the short fiction counterpart of the John W. Campbell Memorial Award for Best Science Fiction Novel, but since 2022, with the closure of both the Campbell conference and award, it has been presented as part of the annual Sturgeon Symposium. Winners are invited to attend and read at the ceremony. Since 2004 winners have received a personalized trophy, and since the inception of the award a permanent trophy has recorded all of the winners.

During the 40 years the award has been active, 243 authors have had works nominated, 40 of whom have won, including one tie. No author has won more than once. John Kessel has won once out of eight nominations, Michael Swanwick one of seven, Ursula K. Le Guin, Nancy Kress, Ian McDonald, and Ted Chiang one of six, and Paolo Bacigalupi and Lucius Shepard have won once out of four times. Robert Reed has the most nominations without winning at eight, followed by James Patrick Kelly and Ian R. MacLeod at seven, Ken Liu at six, and Greg Egan, Yoon Ha Lee, and Bruce Sterling at five.

== Judges ==
From 1987 through 1994 the award was given out by a panel of science fiction experts led by Orson Scott Card. Beginning in 1995, the committee was replaced by a group of jurors, who vote on the nominations submitted for consideration. The initial jurors were James Gunn, Frederik Pohl, and Judith Merril. Merril was replaced on the jury by former winner Kij Johnson in 1997. One of Sturgeon's children—Noel Sturgeon in most years—was added to the panel in 1999. George Zebrowski served as a jury member from 2005 to 2014. Elizabeth Bear was added in 2013. Andy Duncan was a juror from 2013 to 2018. Sarah Pinsker was added in 2019, Taryne Taylor in 2020, and Kelly Link in 2024. As of 2024, the jury includes Elizabeth Bear, Kelly Link, Sarah Pinsker, Noel Sturgeon, and Taryne Taylor. Awards administrators have included Christopher McKitterick, Kij Johnson, and Jason Baltazar.

== Winners and nominees ==
In the following table, the years correspond to the date of the ceremony, rather than when the work was first published. Each year links to the corresponding "year in literature".

^{*} Winner ^{†} 2nd place § 3rd place ¶ Special Citation / Honorable Mention # Withdrawn

Winners and nominees
Year	Author	Work	Publisher or publication	Ref.
1987	Judith Moffett*	"Surviving"	The Magazine of Fantasy & Science Fiction	
1987	Susan Palwick^{†} (Note: Tie for second place)	"Elephant"	Asimov's Science Fiction	
1987	Richard Kearns^{†}	"Grave Angels"	The Magazine of Fantasy & Science Fiction	
1987	Howard Waldrop^{¶}	"The Lions Are Asleep This Night"	Omni	
1987	Pat Cadigan^{¶}	"Pretty Boy Crossover"	Asimov's Science Fiction	
1988	Pat Murphy*	"Rachel in Love"	Asimov's Science Fiction	
1988	Ursula K. Le Guin^{†}	"Buffalo Gals, Won't You Come Out Tonight"	The Magazine of Fantasy & Science Fiction	
1988	Octavia E. Butler^{†}	"The Evening and the Morning and the Night"	Omni	
1988	Walter Jon Williams^{¶}	"Dinosaurs"	Asimov's Science Fiction	
1988	Pat Forde^{¶}	"The Gift"	Analog Science Fact & Fiction	
1988	James Patrick Kelly^{¶}	"Heroics"	Asimov's Science Fiction	
1989	George Alec Effinger*	"Schrödinger's Kitten"	Omni	
1989	Howard Waldrop^{†}	"Do Ya, Do Ya, Wanna Dance?"	Asimov's Science Fiction	
1989	Neal Barrett Jr.^{§}	"Stairs"	Asimov's Science Fiction	
1989	Steven Popkes^{¶}	"The Color Winter"	Asimov's Science Fiction	
1989	John Kessel^{¶}	"Mrs. Shummel Exits a Winner"	Asimov's Science Fiction	
1990	Michael Swanwick*	"The Edge of the World"	Full Spectrum 2 (Doubleday)	
1990	Megan Lindholm^{†}	"Silver Lady and the Fortyish Man"	Asimov's Science Fiction	
1990	Bruce Sterling^{§}	"Dori Bangs"	Asimov's Science Fiction	
1990	James Patrick Kelly^{¶}	"Dancing with the Chairs"	Asimov's Science Fiction	
1990	James Patrick Kelly^{¶}	"Faith"	Asimov's Science Fiction	
1991	Terry Bisson*	"Bears Discover Fire"	Asimov's Science Fiction	
1991	R. A. Lafferty	Episodes of the Argo	United Mythologies Press	
1991	John Barnes	"My Advice to the Civilized"	Asimov's Science Fiction	
1992	John Kessel*	"Buffalo"	The Magazine of Fantasy & Science Fiction	
1992	Alan Brennert^{†}	"Ma Qui"	The Magazine of Fantasy & Science Fiction	
1992	Jonathan Lethem^{§}	"The Happy Man"	Asimov's Science Fiction	
1993	Dan Simmons*	"This Year's Class Picture"	Still Dead (Mark V. Ziesing)	
1993	Judith Tarr^{†}	"Death and the Lady"	After the King: Stories in Honor of J.R.R. Tolkien (Tor Books)	
1993	Pamela Sargent^{§}	"Danny Goes to Mars"	Asimov's Science Fiction	
1993	Connie Willis^{¶}	"Even the Queen"	Asimov's Science Fiction	
1993	David B. Silva^{¶}	"Slipping"	Borderlands 2 (Avon Books)	
1994	Kij Johnson*	"Fox Magic"	Asimov's Science Fiction	
1994	Howard V. Hendrix^{†}	"At the Shadow of a Dream"	Aboriginal SF	
1994	Martha Soukup^{†}	"The Story So Far"	Full Spectrum 4 (Bantam Spectra)	
1995	Ursula K. Le Guin*	"Forgiveness Day"	Asimov's Science Fiction	
1995	Maureen F. McHugh^{†}	"Nekropolis"	Asimov's Science Fiction	
1995	Michael Bishop^{§}	"Cri de Coeur"	Asimov's Science Fiction	
1995	Albert Goldbarth^{¶} (Note: In 1995, "The Two Domains" was awarded a "special citation". For all other years in which a similar award was given, it was entitled "honorable mention".)	"The Two Domains"	Beloit Poetry Journal	
1995	Ursula K. Le Guin	"Another Story or A Fisherman of the Inland Sea"	Tomorrow Speculative Fiction	
1995	Greg Egan	"Cocoon"	Asimov's Science Fiction	
1995	Edward Bryant	"The Fire that Scours"	Omni	
1995	David Gerrold	"The Martian Child"	The Magazine of Fantasy & Science Fiction	
1995	Michael F. Flynn	"Melodies of the Heart"	Analog Science Fiction and Fact	
1995	Pat Cadigan	"Paris In June"	Omni	
1995	Mike Resnick	"Seven Views of Olduvai Gorge"	The Magazine of Fantasy & Science Fiction	
1995	Rick Cook	"Symphony for Skyfall"	Analog Science Fiction and Fact	
1995	Peter L. Manly	"Symphony for Skyfall"	Analog Science Fiction and Fact	
1995	Barry N. Malzberg	"Understanding Entropy"	Science Fiction Age	
1996	John G. McDaid*	"Jigoku no Mokushiroku (The Symbolic Revelation of the Apocalypse)"	Asimov's Science Fiction	
1996	Brian Stableford^{†}	"The Age of Innocence"	Asimov's Science Fiction	
1996	Ray Aldridge^{§}	"The Spine Divers"	The Magazine of Fantasy & Science Fiction	
1996	Paul Levinson	"The Chronology Protection Case"	Analog Science Fiction and Fact	
1996	S. P. Somtow	"Diamonds Aren't Forever"	David Copperfield's Tales of the Impossible (HarperPrism)	
1996	Nancy Kress	"Fault Lines"	Asimov's Science Fiction	
1996	Nina Kiriki Hoffman	"Home for Christmas"	The Magazine of Fantasy & Science Fiction	
1996	Michael Bishop	"I, Iscariot"	Crank!	
1996	Brian Stableford	"Mortimer Gray's History of Death"	Asimov's Science Fiction	
1996	David Marusek	"We Were Out of Our Minds With Joy"	Asimov's Science Fiction	
1996	Robert R. Chase	"The Wellness Plague"	Analog Science Fiction and Fact	
1997	Nancy Kress*	"The Flowers of Aulit Prison"	Asimov's Science Fiction	
1997	William Barton^{†}	"Age of Aquarius"	Asimov's Science Fiction	
1997	Gregory Feeley^{§}	"The Weighing of Ayre"	Starlight 1	
1997	Suzy McKee Charnas	"Beauty and the Opéra or The Phantom Beast"	Asimov's Science Fiction	
1997	Jeff VanderMeer	Dradin, In Love	Buzzcity Press	
1997	Karen Joy Fowler	"The Elizabeth Complex"	Crank!	
1997	John M. Ford	"Erase/Record/Play"	Starlight 1 (Tor Books)	
1997	John Crowley	"Gone"	The Magazine of Fantasy & Science Fiction	
1997	Nancy Kress	"Marigold Outlet"	Twists of the Tale: An Anthology of Cat Horror (Dell Publishing)	
1997	Michael Swanwick	"Radio Waves"	Omni	
1997	James P. Blaylock	"Thirteen Phantasms"	Omni Online	
1998	Michael F. Flynn*	"House of Dreams"	Asimov's Science Fiction	
1998	Allen Steele^{†}	"...Where Angels Fear to Tread"	Asimov's Science Fiction	
1998	Brian Stableford^{§}	"Coming to Grips with the Great Plague"	Omni Online	
1998	Mike Resnick	"The 43 Antarean Dynasties"	Asimov's Science Fiction	
1998	Alan Brennert	"Echoes"	The Magazine of Fantasy & Science Fiction	
1998	Paul Park	"Get a Grip"	The Magazine of Fantasy & Science Fiction	
1998	James Patrick Kelly	"Itsy Bitsy Spider"	Asimov's Science Fiction	
1998	Walter Jon Williams	"Lethe"	Asimov's Science Fiction	
1998	Paul Levinson	"Loose Ends"	Analog Science Fiction and Fact	
1998	Mary Rosenblum	"One Good Juror"	Asimov's Science Fiction	
1998	James Sarafin	"One Good Juror"	Asimov's Science Fiction	
1998	William Sanders	"The Undiscovered"	Asimov's Science Fiction	
1998	Mary Soon Lee	"Universal Grammar"	The Magazine of Fantasy & Science Fiction	
1999	Ted Chiang*	"Story of Your Life"	Starlight 2 (Tor Books)	
1999	Michael Kandel^{†}	"Wading River Dogs and More"	Asimov's Science Fiction	
1999	Ian R. MacLeod^{§}	"The Summer Isles"	Asimov's Science Fiction	
1999	Paul Levinson	"Advantage, Bellarmine"	Analog Science Fiction and Fact	
1999	Gregory Feeley	"Animae Celestes"	Asimov's Science Fiction	
1999	Raphael Carter	"Congenital Agenesis of Gender Ideation by K.N. Sirsi and Sandra Botkin"	Starlight 2 (Tor Books)	
1999	Eliot Fintushel	"Crane Fly"	Amazing Stories	
1999	Cory Doctorow	"Craphound"	Science Fiction Age	
1999	L. Timmel Duchamp	"Dance at the Edge"	Bending the Landscape: Science Fiction (The Overlook Press)	
1999	Kristine Kathryn Rusch	"Echea"	Asimov's Science Fiction	
1999	Gregory Frost	"How Meersh the Bedeviler Lost His Toes"	Asimov's Science Fiction	
1999	Uncle River	"Love of the True God"	Talebones	
1999	James Patrick Kelly	"Lovestory"	Asimov's Science Fiction	
1999	Bruce Sterling	"Maneki Neko"	The Magazine of Fantasy & Science Fiction	
1999	Greg Egan	"The Planck Dive"	Asimov's Science Fiction	
1999	R. Garcia y Robertson	"A Princess of Helium"	The Magazine of Fantasy & Science Fiction	
1999	Michael Swanwick	"Radiant Doors"	Asimov's Science Fiction	
1999	Tony Daniel	"Radio Praha"	Asimov's Science Fiction	
1999	Michael Swanwick	"Wild Minds"	Asimov's Science Fiction	
2000	David Marusek*	"The Wedding Album"	Asimov's Science Fiction	
2000	Eleanor Arnason^{†}	"Dapple: A Hwarhath Historical Romance"	Asimov's Science Fiction	
2000	Judith Berman^{§}	"The Window"	Asimov's Science Fiction	
2000	Ian R. MacLeod	"The Chop Girl"	Asimov's Science Fiction	
2000	Walter Jon Williams	"Daddy's World"	Not of Woman Born (Roc Books)	
2000	Geoff Ryman	"Everywhere"	Interzone	
2000	Brian A. Hopkins	"Five Days in April"	Chiaroscuro	
2000	James Gunn	"The Giftie"	Analog Science Fiction and Fact	
2000	Richard Wadholm	"Green Tea"	Asimov's Science Fiction	
2000	William Sanders	"Jennifer, Just Before Midnight"	The Magazine of Fantasy & Science Fiction	
2000	Terry Bisson	"Macs"	The Magazine of Fantasy & Science Fiction	
2000	Wil McCarthy	"Once Upon a Matter Crushed"	Science Fiction Age	
2000	Michael A. Burstein	"Reality Check"	Analog Science Fiction and Fact	
2000	M. John Harrison	"Suicide Coast"	The Magazine of Fantasy & Science Fiction	
2000	Robert Reed	"Winemaster"	The Magazine of Fantasy & Science Fiction	
2001	Ian McDonald*	Tendeléo's Story	PS Publishing	
2001	Stephen Baxter^{†}	"Sheena 5"	Analog Science Fiction and Fact	
2001	Lucius Shepard^{§}	"Radiant Green Star"	Asimov's Science Fiction	
2001	Charles Stross	"Antibodies"	Interzone	
2001	Ursula K. Le Guin	"The Birthday of the World"	The Magazine of Fantasy & Science Fiction	
2001	William Barton	"Heart of Glass"	Asimov's Science Fiction	
2001	John Kessel	"The Juniper Tree"	Science Fiction Age	
2001	Eliot Fintushel	"Milo and Sylvie"	Asimov's Science Fiction	
2001	Stephen Baxter	"On the Orion Line"	Asimov's Science Fiction	
2001	Paul J. McAuley	"Reef"	Skylife: Space Habitats in Story and Science (Harcourt)	
2001	Nancy Kress	"Savior"	Asimov's Science Fiction	
2001	Ted Chiang	"Seventy-Two Letters"	Vanishing Acts (Tor Books)	
2002	Andy Duncan*	"The Chief Designer"	Asimov's Science Fiction	
2002	Charles Stross^{†}	"Lobsters"	Asimov's Science Fiction	
2002	James Patrick Kelly^{§}	"Undone"	Asimov's Science Fiction	
2002	James K. Morrow	"The Cat's Pajamas"	The Magazine of Fantasy & Science Fiction	
2002	Michael Swanwick	"The Dog Said Bow-Wow"	Asimov's Science Fiction	
2002	Lucius Shepard	"Eternity and Afterward"	The Magazine of Fantasy & Science Fiction	
2002	Geoff Ryman	"Have Not Have"	The Magazine of Fantasy & Science Fiction	
2002	Ted Chiang	"Hell Is the Absence of God"	Starlight 3 (Tor Books)	
2002	Maureen F. McHugh	"Interview: On Any Given Day"	Starlight 3 (Tor Books)	
2002	Ian R. MacLeod	"Isabel of the Fall"	Interzone	
2002	Richard Chwedyk	"The Measure of All Things"	The Magazine of Fantasy & Science Fiction	
2002	Ian R. MacLeod	"New Light on the Drake Equation"	Sci Fiction	
2003	Lucius Shepard*	"Over Yonder"	Sci Fiction	
2003	Richard Chwedyk^{†}	"Bronte's Egg"	The Magazine of Fantasy & Science Fiction	
2003	Greg Egan^{§}	"Singleton"	Interzone	
2003	Ian R. MacLeod	"Breathmoss"	Asimov's Science Fiction	
2003	Robert Reed	"Coelacanths"	The Magazine of Fantasy & Science Fiction	
2003	Charles Stross	"Halo"	Asimov's Science Fiction	
2003	Bruce Sterling	"In Paradise"	The Magazine of Fantasy & Science Fiction	
2003	Ted Chiang	"Liking What You See: A Documentary"	Stories of Your Life and Others (Tor Books)	
2003	Gregory Frost	"Madonna of the Maquiladora"	Asimov's Science Fiction	
2003	Ursula K. Le Guin	"The Seasons of the Ansarac"	The Infinite Matrix 3	
2003	John Kessel	"Stories for Men"	Asimov's Science Fiction	
2003	Ursula K. Le Guin	"The Wild Girls"	Asimov's Science Fiction	
2003	Paul Di Filippo	A Year in the Linear City	PS Publishing	
2004	Kage Baker*	"The Empress of Mars"	Asimov's Science Fiction	
2004	James Patrick Kelly^{†}	"Bernardo's House"	Asimov's Science Fiction	
2004	John Kessel^{§}	"It's All True"	Sci Fiction	
2004	Jack Skillingstead	"Dead Worlds"	Asimov's Science Fiction	
2004	William Sanders	"Dry Bones"	Asimov's Science Fiction	
2004	Jeffrey Ford	"The Empire of Ice Cream"	Sci Fiction	
2004	Paolo Bacigalupi	"The Fluted Girl"	The Magazine of Fantasy & Science Fiction	
2004	Ruth Nestvold	"Looking Through Lace"	Asimov's Science Fiction	
2004	William Barton	"Off on a Starship"	Asimov's Science Fiction	
2004	Lucius Shepard	"Only Partly Here"	Asimov's Science Fiction	
2004	David D. Levine	"The Tale of the Golden Eagle"	The Magazine of Fantasy & Science Fiction	
2004	Adam-Troy Castro	"The Tangled Strings of the Marionettes"	The Magazine of Fantasy & Science Fiction	
2005	Bradley Denton*	"Sergeant Chip"	The Magazine of Fantasy & Science Fiction	
2005	Christopher Rowe^{†}	"The Voluntary State"	Sci Fiction	
2005	Robert Reed^{§}	"Mere"	Golden Gryphon Press	
2005	Ian Watson	"An Appeal to Adolf"	Conqueror Fantastic (DAW Books)	
2005	Gregory Feeley	"Arabian Wine"	Asimov's Science Fiction	
2005	John Kessel	"The Baum Plan for Financial Independence"	Sci Fiction	
2005	David Gerrold	"Dancer in the Dark"	The Magazine of Fantasy & Science Fiction	
2005	Judith Berman	"The Fear Gun"	Asimov's Science Fiction	
2005	Lois Tilton	"The Gladiator's War: A Dialog"	Asimov's Science Fiction	
2005	Steven Utley	"Invisible Kingdoms"	The Magazine of Fantasy & Science Fiction	
2005	Gene Wolfe	"The Lost Pilgrim"	The First Heroes: New Tales of the Bronze Age (Tor Books)	
2005	Nnedi Okorafor-Mbachu	"The Magical Negro"	Dark Matter: Reading the Bones (Warner Aspect)	
2005	Steve Tomasula	"The Risk-Taking Gene as Expressed by Some Asian Subjects"	Denver Quarterly	
2005	Brenda Cooper	"Savant Songs"	Analog Science Fiction and Fact	
2005	Terry Bisson	"Scout's Honor"	Sci Fiction	
2005	Margo Lanagan	"Singing My Sister Down"	Black Juice (Allen & Unwin)	
2005	Benjamin Rosenbaum	"Start the Clock"	The Magazine of Fantasy & Science Fiction	
2005	Kelly Link	"Stone Animals"	Conjunctions 43: Beyond Arcadia	
2005	Mike Moscoe	"The Strange Redemption of Sister Mary Ann"	Analog Science Fiction and Fact	
2005	Pamela Sargent	"Venus Flowers at Night"	Microcosms (DAW Books)	
2006	Paolo Bacigalupi*	"The Calorie Man"	The Magazine of Fantasy & Science Fiction	
2006	Ian McDonald^{†}	"The Little Goddess"	Asimov's Science Fiction	
2006	Kelly Link^{§}	"Magic for Beginners"	Magic for Beginners (Small Beer Press)	
2006	Bruce Sterling	"The Blemmye's Stratagem"	The Magazine of Fantasy & Science Fiction	
2006	James Van Pelt	"The Inn at Mount Either"	Analog Science Fiction and Fact	
2006	Connie Willis	"Inside Job"	Asimov's Science Fiction	
2006	John G. McDaid	"Keyboard Practice, Consisting of an Aria with Diverse Variations for the Harpsichord with Two Manuals"	The Magazine of Fantasy & Science Fiction	
2006	Vonda N. McIntyre	"Little Faces"	Sci Fiction	
2006	Jason Stoddard	"Panacea"	Sci Fiction	
2006	Daryl Gregory	"Second Person, Present Tense"	Asimov's Science Fiction	
2007	Robert Charles Wilson*	"The Cartesian Theater"	FutureShocks (Roc Books)	
2007	Robert Reed^{†}	"A Billion Eves"	Asimov's Science Fiction	
2007	Michael Swanwick^{§}	"Lord Weary's Empire"	Asimov's Science Fiction	
2007	Christopher Rowe	"Another Word for Map Is Faith"	The Magazine of Fantasy & Science Fiction	
2007	Michael F. Flynn	"Dawn, and Sunset, and the Colours of the Earth"	Asimov's Science Fiction	
2007	Ian McDonald	"The Djinn's Wife"	Asimov's Science Fiction	
2007	Benjamin Rosenbaum	"The House Beyond Your Sky"	Strange Horizons	
2007	William Shunn	"Inclination"	Asimov's Science Fiction	
2007	Robert Charles Wilson	Julian: A Christmas Story	PS Publishing	
2007	Paul Melko	"The Walls of the Universe"	Asimov's Science Fiction	
2007	Paolo Bacigalupi	"Yellow Card Man"	Asimov's Science Fiction	
2007	M. Rickert	"You Have Never Been Here"	Feeling Very Strange: The Slipstream Anthology (Tachyon Publications)	
2008	David Moles* (Note: In 2008, two works were named co-winners and a further two works tied for second place.)	"Finisterra"	The Magazine of Fantasy & Science Fiction	
2008	Elizabeth Bear*	"Tideline"	Asimov's Science Fiction	
2008	Ian R. MacLeod^{†}	"The Master Miller's Tale"	The Magazine of Fantasy & Science Fiction	
2008	Gene Wolfe^{†}	"Memorare"	The Magazine of Fantasy & Science Fiction	
2008	Karen Joy Fowler	"Always"	Asimov's Science Fiction	
2008	Johanna Sinisalo	"Baby Doll"	The SFWA European Hall of Fame (Tor Books)	
2008	Jeffrey Ford	"The Dreaming Wind"	The Coyote Road: Trickster Tales (Viking Press)	
2008	Kij Johnson	"The Evolution of Trickster Stories Among the Dogs of North Park After the Change"	The Coyote Road: Trickster Tales (Viking Press)	
2008	Laird Barron	"The Forest"	Inferno (Tor Books)	
2008	John Kessel	"The Last American"	Foundation	
2008	Ted Chiang	"The Merchant and the Alchemist's Gate"	The Magazine of Fantasy & Science Fiction	
2008	Gwyneth Jones	"The Tomb Wife"	The Magazine of Fantasy & Science Fiction	
2009	James Alan Gardner*	"The Ray-Gun: A Love Story"	Asimov's Science Fiction	
2009	Kathleen Ann Goonan^{†}	"Memory Dog"	Asimov's Science Fiction	
2009	Ian McDonald^{§}	"The Tear"	Galactic Empires (Science Fiction Book Club)	
2009	Michael Swanwick	"From Babel's Fall'n Glory We Fled"	Asimov's Science Fiction	
2009	Paolo Bacigalupi	"The Gambler"	Fast Forward 2 (Pyr)	
2009	Hannu Rajaniemi	"His Master's Voice"	Interzone	
2009	Charles Coleman Finlay	"The Political Prisoner"	The Magazine of Fantasy & Science Fiction	
2009	Maureen F. McHugh	"Special Economics"	The Del Rey Book of Science Fiction and Fantasy (Del Rey Books)	
2009	Cory Doctorow	"True Names"	Fast Forward 2 (Pyr)	
2010	James K. Morrow*	Shambling Towards Hiroshima	Tachyon Publications	
2010	Sara Genge^{†} (Note: Three-way tie for second place)	"As Women Fight"	Asimov's Science Fiction	
2010	John Barnes^{†}	"Things Undone"	Jim Baen's Universe	
2010	Damien Broderick^{†}	"This Wind Blowing, and this Tide"	Asimov's Science Fiction	
2010	Ted Kosmatka	"Blood Dauber"	Asimov's Science Fiction	
2010	Michael Poore	"Blood Dauber"	Asimov's Science Fiction	
2010	Tanith Lee	"Clockatrice"	Fantasy Magazine	
2010	Lewis Shiner	"The Death of Che Guevara"	Subterranean Press	
2010	Rachel Swirsky	"Eros, Philia, Agape"	Tor.com	
2010	Tim Pratt	"Her Voice in a Bottle"	Subterranean Press	
2010	Peter Watts	"The Island"	The New Space Opera 2 (Eos)	
2010	Robert Reed	"True Fame"	Asimov's Science Fiction	
2010	Kij Johnson^{#} (Note: Withdrawn due to conflict of interest)	"Spar"	Clarkesworld Magazine	
2011	Geoffrey A. Landis*	"The Sultan of the Clouds"	Asimov's Science Fiction	
2011	Elizabeth Hand^{†}	"The Maiden Flight of McCauley's Bellerophon"	Stories (William Morrow and Company)	
2011	Peter Watts^{§}	"The Things"	Clarkesworld Magazine	
2011	Robert Reed	"Dead Man's Run"	The Magazine of Fantasy & Science Fiction	
2011	Yoon Ha Lee	"Flower, Mercy, Needle, Chain"	Lightspeed	
2011	Paul Park	"Ghosts Doing the Orange Dance"	The Magazine of Fantasy & Science Fiction	
2011	Steve Rasnic Tem	"A Letter from the Emperor"	Asimov's Science Fiction	
2011	Eleanor Arnason	"Mammoths of the Great Plains"	Mammoths of the Great Plains (PM Press)	
2011	Lavie Tidhar	"The Night Train"	Strange Horizons	
2011	Alastair Reynolds	"Troika"	Godlike Machines (Science Fiction Book Club)	
2011	Damien Broderick	"Under the Moons of Venus"	Subterranean Magazine	
2012	Paul J. McAuley*	"The Choice"	Asimov's Science Fiction	
2012	Charlie Jane Anders^{†}	"Six Months, Three Days"	Tor.com	
2012	Ken Liu^{§}	"The Paper Menagerie"	The Magazine of Fantasy & Science Fiction	
2012	Paul Cornell	"The Copenhagen Interpretation"	Asimov's Science Fiction	
2012	Yoon Ha Lee	"Ghostweight"	Clarkesworld Magazine	
2012	Jake Kerr	"The Old Equations"	Lightspeed	
2012	Ken Liu	"The Man Who Ended History: A Documentary"	Panverse 3 (Panverse Publishing)	
2012	Catherynne M. Valente	"Silently and Very Fast"	Clarkesworld Magazine	
2013	Molly Gloss*	"The Grinnell Method"	Strange Horizons	
2013	Linda Nagata^{†}	"Nahiku West"	Analog Science Fiction and Fact	
2013	Robert Reed^{§}	Eater-of-Bone	PS Publishing	
2013	Kate Bachus	"Things Greater Than Love"	Strange Horizons	
2013	Aliette de Bodard	"Immersion"	Clarkesworld Magazine	
2013	Aliette de Bodard	"Scattered Along the River of Heaven"	Clarkesworld Magazine	
2013	Jay Lake	"The Weight of History, The Lightness of the Future"	Subterranean Magazine	
2013	Ken Liu	"The Bookmaking Habits of Select Species"	Lightspeed	
2013	Ken Liu	"Mono No Aware"	The Future is Japanese (Haikasoru)	
2013	Bruce Sterling	"The Peak of Eternal Light"	Edge of Infinity (Solaris Books)	
2013	E. Catherine Tobler	"(To See the Other) Whole Against the Sky"	Clarkesworld Magazine	
2013	Nancy Kress	After the Fall, Before the Fall, During the Fall	Tachyon Publications	
2014	Sarah Pinsker*	"In Joy, Knowing the Abyss Behind"	Strange Horizons	
2014	Robert Reed^{†}	"Mystic Falls"	Clarkesworld Magazine	
2014	Vylar Kaftan^{§}	"The Weight of the Sunrise"	Asimov's Science Fiction	
2014	Gregory Norman Bossert	"Bloom"	Asimov's Science Fiction	
2014	Alaya Dawn Johnson	"They Shall Salt the Earth with Seeds of Glass"	Asimov's Science Fiction	
2014	Will McIntosh	"Over There"	Asimov's Science Fiction	
2014	Alan DeNiro	"The Wildfires of Antarctica"	Asimov's Science Fiction	
2014	Val Nolan	"The Irish Astronaut"	Electric Velocipede	
2014	Kenneth Schneyer	"Selected Program Notes from the Retrospective Exhibition of Theresa Rosenberg Latimer"	Clockwork Phoenix 4 (Mythic Delirium Books)	
2014	E. Lily Yu	"The Urashima Effect"	Clarkesworld Magazine	
2015	Cory Doctorow*	"The Man Who Sold the Moon"	Hieroglyph: Stories and Visions for a Better Future (William Morrow)	
2015	Suzanne Palmer^{†}	"Shatterdown"	Asimov's Science Fiction	
2015	Sam J. Miller^{§}	"We Are the Cloud"	Lightspeed	
2015	Gregory Benford	"Lady With Fox"	Carbide Tipped Pens (Tor Books)	
2015	Octavia E. Butler	"Childfinder"	Unexpected Stories (Open Road Media)	
2015	Seth Chambers	"In Her Eyes"	The Magazine of Fantasy & Science Fiction	
2015	Tananarive Due	"Herd Immunity"	The End is Now (CreateSpace)	
2015	Eugie Foster	"When It Ends, He Catches Her"	Daily Science Fiction	
2015	Daryl Gregory	We Are All Completely Fine	Tachyon Publications	
2015	Nancy Kress	Yesterday's Kin	Tachyon Publications	
2015	Geoffrey A. Landis	"A Hotel in Antarctica"	Hieroglyph: Stories and Visions for a Better Future (William Morrow)	
2015	Ken Liu	"The Regular"	Upgraded (Wyrm Publishing)	
2015	Pat MacEwen	"The Lightness of the Movement"	The Magazine of Fantasy & Science Fiction	
2015	Ian McDonald	"The Fifth Dragon"	Reach for Infinity (Solaris Books)	
2015	Robert Reed	"The Cryptic Age"	Asimov's Science Fiction	
2016	Kelly Link*	"The Game of Smash and Recovery"	Strange Horizons	
2016	Eugene Fischer^{†}	"The New Mother"	Asimov's Science Fiction	
2016	Carter Scholz^{§}	"Gypsy"	The Magazine of Fantasy & Science Fiction	
2016	Brooke Bolander	"And You Shall Know Her by the Trail of Dead"	Lightspeed	
2016	Jeff Somers	"Avery Cates: The Walled City"	self-published	
2016	Ian McDonald	"Botanica Veneris: Thirteen Papercuts by Ida Countess Rathangan"	Old Venus (Bantam Books)	
2016	David D. Levine	"Damage"	Tor.com	
2016	Gwyneth Jones	"Emergence"	Meeting Infinity (Solaris Books)	
2016	Hao Jingfang	"Folding Beijing"	Uncanny Magazine	
2016	Greg Egan	"The Four Thousand, the Eight Hundred"	Asimov's Science Fiction	
2016	Sarah Pinsker	"Our Lady of the Open Road"	Asimov's Science Fiction	
2016	Kelly Robson	"The Three Resurrections of Jessica Churchill"	Clarkesworld Magazine	
2017	Catherynne M. Valente*	"The Future is Blue"	Drowned Worlds (Solaris Books)	
2017	Carolyn Ives Gilman^{†}	"Touring With The Alien"	Clarkesworld Magazine	
2017	Sam J. Miller^{§}	"Things With Beards"	Clarkesworld Magazine	
2017	Nina Allan	"The Art of Space Travel"	Tor.com	
2017	Amal El-Mohtar	"Seasons of Glass and Iron"	The Starlit Wood: New Fairy Tales (Saga Press)	
2017	Victor LaValle	The Ballad of Black Tom	Tor.com Publishing	
2017	Ian R. MacLeod	"The Visitor From Taured"	Asimov's Science Fiction	
2017	Dominica Phetteplace	"Project Empathy"	Asimov's Science Fiction	
2017	Kai Ashante Wilson	A Taste of Honey	Tor.com Publishing	
2018	Charlie Jane Anders*	"Don't Press Charges and I Won't Sue"	Global Dystopias (The Boston Review)	
2018	Sarah Pinsker^{†}	"And Then There Were (N-One)"	Uncanny Magazine	
2018	Vina Jie-Min Prasad^{§}	"A Series of Steaks"	Clarkesworld Magazine	
2018	Tobias S. Buckell	"Zen and the Art of Starship Maintenance"	Cosmic Powers: The Saga Anthology of Far Away Galaxies (Saga Press)	
2018	Greg Egan	"The Discrete Charm of the Turing Machine"	Asimov's Science Fiction	
2018	Maureen F. McHugh	"Sidewalks"	Omni	
2018	Linda Nagata	"The Martian Obelisk"	Tor.com	
2018	Suzanne Palmer	"The Secret Life of Bots"	Clarkesworld Magazine	
2018	Vina Jie-Min Prasad	"Fandom for Robots"	Uncanny Magazine	
2018	Rebecca Roanhorse	"Welcome to Your Authentic Indian Experience™"	Apex Magazine	
2018	Kelly Robson	"We Who Live in the Heart"	Clarkesworld Magazine	
2019	Annalee Newitz*	"When Robot and Crow Saved East St. Louis"	Slate.com	
2019	Adam Shannon^{†}	"On the Day You Spend Forever with Your Dog"	Apex Magazine	
2019	Daryl Gregory^{§}	"Nine Last Days on Planet Earth"	Tor.com	
2019	L. X. Beckett	"Freezing Rain, A Chance of Falling"	The Magazine of Fantasy & Science Fiction	
2019	Brooke Bolander	The Only Harmless Great Thing	Tor.com Publishing	
2019	P. Djèlí Clark	"The Secret Lives of the Nine Negro Teeth of George Washington"	Fireside Magazine	
2019	Carolyn Ives Gilman	"Umbernight"	Clarkesworld Magazine	
2019	Simone Heller	"When We Were Starless"	Clarkesworld Magazine	
2019	Yoon Ha Lee	"The Starship and the Temple Cat"	Beneath Ceaseless Skies	
2019	Kelly Robson	Gods, Monsters, and the Lucky Peach	Tor.com Publishing	
2019	Tade Thompson	"Yard Dog"	Fiyah	
2020	Suzanne Palmer*	"Waterlines"	Asimov's Science Fiction	
2020	Amal El-Mohtar^{†}	This Is How You Lose the Time War	Saga Press	
2020	Max Gladstone^{†}	This Is How You Lose the Time War	Saga Press	
2020	Karin Tidbeck^{§}	"The Last Voyage of Skidbladnir"	Tor.com	
2020	Caroline M. Yoachim	"The Archronology of Love"	Lightspeed	
2020	Karen Osborne	"The Dead, In Their Uncontrollable Power"	Uncanny Magazine	
2020	Tobias S. Buckell	"The Galactic Tourist Industrial Complex"	New Suns (Solaris Books)	
2020	A. T. Greenblatt	"Give the Family My Love"	Clarkesworld Magazine	
2020	Lavie Tidhar	"New Atlantis"	The Magazine of Fantasy & Science Fiction	
2020	Ted Chiang	"Omphalos"	Exhalation: Stories (Alfred A. Knopf)	
2020	Suzanne Palmer	"The Painter of Trees"	Clarkesworld Magazine	
2020	Lina Rather	Sisters of the Vast Black	Tor.com Publishing	
2021	Rebecca Campbell*	"An Important Failure"	Clarkesworld Magazine	
2021	Meg Elison^{†}	"The Pill"	Big Girl (PM Press)	
2021	Maureen F. McHugh^{§}	"Yellow and the Perception of Reality"	Tor.com	
2021	Ken Liu	"50 Things Every AI Working with Humans Should Know"	Uncanny Magazine	
2021	Sameem Siddiqui	"AirBody"	Clarkesworld Magazine	
2021	Vina Jie-Min Prasad	"A Guide for Working Breeds"	Tor.com	
2021	Charlie Jane Anders	"If You Take My Meaning"	Tor.com	
2021	Oghenechovwe Donald Ekpeki	"Ife-Iyoku, the Tale of Imadeyunuagbon"	Dominion (Aurelia Leo)	
2021	Marian Denise Moore	"A Mastery of German"	Dominion (Aurelia Leo)	
2021	Yoon Ha Lee	"The Mermaid Astronaut"	Beneath Ceaseless Skies	
2021	Vajra Chandrasekera	"The Translator, at Low Tide"	Clarkesworld Magazine	
2022	Nalo Hopkinson*	"Broad Dutty Water: A Sunken Story"	The Magazine of Fantasy & Science Fiction	
2022	Suzanne Palmer^{†}	"Bots of the Lost Ark"	Clarkesworld Magazine	
2022	John Kessel^{§}	"The Dark Ride"	The Magazine of Fantasy & Science Fiction	
2022	Daryl Gregory	The Album of Dr. Moreau	Tor.com Publishing	
2022	P. Djèlí Clark	"If the Martians Have Magic"	Uncanny Magazine	
2022	David Moles	"The Metric"	Asimov's Science Fiction	
2022	E. Catherine Tobler	The Necessity of Stars	Neon Hemlock Press	
2022	R. S. A. Garcia	"Philia, Eros, Storge, Agápe, Pragma"	Clarkesworld Magazine	
2022	José Pablo Iriarte	"Proof by Induction"	Uncanny Magazine	
2022	Ray Nayler	"Sarcophagus"	Clarkesworld Magazine	
2023	Samantha Mills*	"Rabbit Test"	Uncanny Magazine	
2023	Nicasio Andres Reed ^{†}	"Babang Luksa"	Reckoning	
2023	Yoon Ha Lee ^{§}	"Bonsai Starships"	Beneath Ceaseless Skies	
2023	Innocent Chizaram	"The City and the Thing Beneath It"	The Magazine of Fantasy & Science Fiction	
2023	Annalee Newitz	"A Hole in the Light"	Sunday Morning Transport	
2023	A. T. Greenblatt	"If We Make It Through This Alive"	Slate	
2023	Maria Dong	"In the Beginning of Me, I Was a Bird"	Lightspeed	
2023	Dominique Dickey	"Slow Communication"	Fantasy	
2023	Derrick Boden	"Ten Steps for Effective Mold Removal"	Apex Magazine	
2023	A. D. Sui	"Toronto Isn't Real and Other Metropolitcan Anomalies"	Augur Magazine	
2024	R. S. A. Garcia*	"Tantie Merle and the Farmhand 4200"	Uncanny Magazine	
2024	Beston Barnett^{†}	"Patsy Cline Sings Sweet Dreams to the Universe"	Strange Horizons	
2024	Naomi Kritzer^{§}	"The Year Without Sunshine"	Uncanny Magazine	
2024	Wendy N. Wagner	"An Infestation of Blue"	Analog Science Fiction and Fact	
2024	Amal Singh	"Notes From a Pyre"	The Deadlands	
2024	Violet Allen	"The Rainbow Ghosts"	Luminescent Machinations: Queer Tales of Monumental Invention (Neon Hemlock Press)	
2024	Claire Humphrey	"The State Street Robot Factory"	Apex Magazine	
2024	Gregory Feeley	"The Unpastured Sea"	Asimov's Science Fiction	
2024	James Patrick Kelly	"What It Means to Be a Car"	Tor.com	
2025	Conrad Loyer*	"The Carcosa Pattern"	Fiyah	
2025	F. E. Choe ^{†}	"Swarm X1048 – Ethological Field Report: Canis Lupus Familiaris, '6'"	Clarkesworld Magazine	
2025	TJ Klune ^{§}	"Reduce! Reuse! Recycle!"	Reactor	
2025	Jordan Kurella	"Evan: A Remainder"	Reactor	
2025	Fiona Jones	"Hello! Hello! Hello!"	Clarkesworld Magazine	
2025	Daniel Abraham (as James S. A. Corey)	"Judas Iscariot Didn't Kill Himself: A Story in Fragments"	The Last Dangerous Visions (Blackstone Publishers)	
2025	Ty Franck (as James S. A. Corey)	"Judas Iscariot Didn't Kill Himself: A Story in Fragments"	The Last Dangerous Visions (Blackstone Publishers)	
2025	Esther Alter	"Rachel Is At a Protest"	The Deadlands	
2025	Nkone Chaka	"To Eat Your Own Head"	Asimov's Science Fiction	
2025	Caroline M. Yoachim	"We Will Teach You How to Read | We Will Teach You How to Read"	Lightspeed	
2025	Isabel J. Kim	"Why Don't We Just Kill the Kid in the Omelas Hole"	Clarkesworld Magazine	
2026	Alex T. Singer*	"We, the Fleet"	Clarkesworld Magazine	
2026	Rich Larson^{†}	"The Sack of Burley Cottage"	Reactor	
2026	Alaya Dawn Johnson^{§}	"The Shadow on the Nest"	Uncanny Magazine	
2026	Monte Lin	"his love's ashes on his tongue"	The Deadlands	
2026	Effie Seiberg	"Laser Eyes Ain't Everything"	Diabolical Plots	
2026	Tia Tashiro	"Missing Helen"	Clarkesworld Magazine	
2026	Louise Hughes	"The Nine Crashes of Flight Lieutenant Hilla Quinn"	Kaleidotrope	
2026	J. R. Dawson	"Six People to Revise You"	Uncanny Magazine	
2026	Isabel J. Kim	"Wire Mother"	Clarkesworld Magazine	
2026	Carrie Vaughn	"Woolly"	Asimov's Science Fiction	
