= Critical response to Royal Space Force: The Wings of Honnêamise =

Critical response to the 1987 anime film

The 1987 debut work of anime studio Gainax, Royal Space Force: The Wings of Honnêamise, written and directed by Hiroyuki Yamaga, has generated critical response from diverse sources in Japan and internationally, including major newspapers, film journals, newsweeklies, fan polls, film directors, anime industry magazines, film encyclopedias and reference books, television network executives, and science fiction authors. Among anime directors, Hayao Miyazaki, Mamoru Oshii, and Hideaki Anno have remarked upon the film's impact and influence.

Views of Royal Space Force varied widely during both its original 1987 release in Japan and its first licensed release in English during 1994–95, when a dubbed version of the movie toured art house movie theaters and festivals in portions of the English-speaking world, in some cases receiving recommendations from film critics but in others highly negative reviews. Since the 1990s, various historical surveys of anime have assessed the film more positively, with former Film Comment editor-in-chief Richard Corliss regarding it as a work that made "anime officially an art form;" Jason DeMarco, current senior vice president at Warner Discovery and co-creator of Toonami, has ranked it as the #11 anime movie of all time, stating "If The Wings of Honnêamise is a 'noble failure,' it's the sort of failure many filmmakers would kill to have on their résumé."

== Reception ==
=== Critical response in Japan ===
==== Newspapers and film journals ====
The Yomiuri Shimbun, Japan's largest daily newspaper, published a mixed review of the film the day before its Japanese premiere, advising readers that, "if what you're seeking is Top Gun heroic fantasy, you're not going to get it;" the review took the perspective that rather Hiroyuki Yamaga, as director, writer, and original concept creator, had been attempting with the film "to pour out all the images within his mind into contemporary Japanese society". The newspaper characterized the film as scattered and boring at times, and stated a certain "resentment at its lack of excitement", but concluded by expressing its admiration for the film on the grounds of its effort and expense, honest and personal vision, and for not clinging to the patterns of previous anime works.

Tetsuo Daitoku, editor of the anime magazine OUT, reviewed Royal Space Force for Japan's oldest film journal, Kinema Junpo, in their March 15, 1987, issue. (Note: The review's title does not use isekai in its current sense of a story genre where the main character is someone transported to another world; here it refers simply to the idea of another, alternate world itself.) Daitoku wrote that he began watching the film wondering why the young creative staff making the film, whom he called "a new kind of people in anime," (Note: Daitoku, in describing Gainax as a "new kind of people", employs the term shinjinrui (新人類), sometimes used as a Japanese equivalent of what in the United States is referred to as Generation X.; the term was also used repeatedly by Bandai president and executive producer of the film Makoto Yamashina to describe both Gainax and the film's intended audience.) had chosen to use the "well-worn subject" of space travel, which had already been the focus of such iconic works as Space Battleship Yamato, not to mention live-action films such as The Right Stuff. Daitoku however found the question in his mind being removed "little by little" as the film progressed: "Yes, human beings have gone beyond this world in the physical sense, and left their footprints up among the stars, but did their conscience and mentality go along with them?" He felt the film acknowledged the issue and therefore took it as "necessary to observe the history and civilization of mankind from [a point] where the whole Earth can be seen ... This motif is the underlying basis of The Wings of Honnêamise. It is clear from the scenes at the end that we are seeing the reality of human history, not [only] that of a different world." By "taking full advantage of the unique medium of animation," the creators "observe civilization objectively first and then disassemble it to eventually restructure it"... "creating the different world by newly creating everything", down to the spoons, in the example Daitoku gives. "Stories that feature cool machines, robots, and attractive characters, with the plot unfolding while drifting through space, already reached their peak in a sense with the [1984] Macross movie. Rather than trying to go beyond Macross, I think the creators of this film believed that they could find a new horizon for anime by creating a different world in a way that draws the story closer to Earth again." Daitoku points out Shirotsugh is aware that whatever technology humans invent will be misused, and that Shirotsugh, although with noble intentions, is shown by the film to be less than heroic as a person, asking in conclusion: "What did the windmill mean that this Don Quixote named Shirotsugh Lhadatt went to space to confront, on this Rozinante called a rocket?"

==== Anime and science fiction fan community ====
Royal Space Force ranked high in major annual retrospectives awarded by the Japanese anime press. The film won the Japan Anime Award for best anime release of 1987, chosen by an industry jury and sponsored by a consortium of magazines including Animedia, (Note: Founded in 1981, Animedia is Japan's second oldest remaining anime magazine after Animage, although it is perhaps better known for its spinoff magazine focusing on bishōjo characters, Megami.) OUT, My Anime, The Anime, and Animec. In the Anime Grand Prix fan poll rankings, sponsored by Animage magazine, Royal Space Force made two of the year's top ten lists: voted #4 anime release of 1987, with Shirotsugh Lhadatt as #9 male character, in addition to receiving an Animage Award presented that year by the magazine to the film itself. (Note: The Animage Award was a special recognition prize and former category of the Anime Grand Prix that was issued on several occasions between 1981 and 1987.) In 1988, Royal Space Force won the Seiun Award, Japan's oldest prize for science fiction, for Best Dramatic Presentation of the previous year. At the beginning of 1989, the Animage editorial department, writing for Tokuma Shoten's retrospective on the first 70 years of anime film, compared Royal Space Force to Isao Takahata's 1968 debut The Great Adventure of Horus, Prince of the Sun; just as Horus had suddenly demonstrated a new level of realism and social themes in anime, Animage saw Royal Space Force as a work that also seemed to have emerged onto the scene unrelated to any previous commercial release, "an anime movie with a different methodology and message ... It's uncertain what influence it will have on anime in the future, but what is certain is that this was a work filled with the tremendous passion of its young staff." (Note: Hayao Miyazaki, who had been a key animator and scene designer on Takahata's film, would in 1995 himself argue that the staff of Royal Space Force demonstrated it remained possible to make an anime film the way he had helped to make Horus in the 1960s, as part of a crew of "inexperienced amateurs in their mid-20s, who hung out together and ate together, who mingled their work and their personal lives together".)

==== Directors ====
The March 15 issue of Kinema Junpo also featured a conversation on the film between Hiroyuki Yamaga and Hayao Miyazaki. Miyazaki praised Royal Space Force, calling it "an honest work, without any bluff or pretension ... I thought the movie is going to be a great inspiration to the young people working in this industry. They may be intensely divided over whether they like it or not, but either way it's going to serve as a stimulus." Yamaga debated several aspects of the film with Miyazaki, asserting a great difference between their filmmaking approaches. Miyazaki himself characterized a fundamental difference between the settings of his movies and that of Royal Space Force, explaining he thought Yamaga's film was honest because, "sending up a rocket may give the characters meaning in their lives, but you understand very well they live in a world where they'll be caught up by reality again. That's why I make anachronistic [anime] films on purpose." (Note: The phrase Miyazaki used in referring to his own movies was manga eiga (マンガ映画; "cartoon films"), a once popular term in Japan for animated works.) In the OUT roundtable later that year, Gainax president Toshio Okada would also affirm this difference: "People make serious movies trying to give answers. Mr. Miyazaki's stories are good examples. He creates a fictitious world where he can respond, 'this is what's important.' But our generation knows that it doesn't work that way."

"I don't know if I'm trying to drag you into my arena today; I just want to be clear to you about the parts I don't understand. But more than that, I wanted to tell you that I really think The Wings of Honnêamise is great. I wasn't under any obligation to look upon it kindly. I was ready to say it was no good if it really wasn't. But then I went to see the film, and I left it with good feelings."

— Hayao Miyazaki in conversation with Hiroyuki Yamaga, 1987

In the Kinema Junpo conversation, Miyazaki related the two problems he personally had with Royal Space Force. The first was the rocket itself, which he saw as not unusual enough; for Miyazaki, its appearance detracted from the sense of victory he wished to feel at the end, because it seemed too reminiscent of "big science like NASA". Related to that was his second problem with the film, in that Miyazaki did not find it convincing that the older members of the launch team would have been prepared to stop the countdown and give up after all their years of work, and that it was Shirotsugh who had to rally them to continue: "I didn't think these old guys would ever say, let's quit. Don't you agree? They seemed forced to say that ... Shirotsugh was only riding because he had the physical strength. After all, it wasn't the young people who'd had the passion; I couldn't help but feel that it was the old guys. I thought it was just done for drama." Yamaga did not deny that he wrote the script in a way he thought would appeal to young people, but felt it very important to note the contributions of the older and younger generation to both the launch of the rocket, and to the making of the film itself. Miyazaki felt that since it was young people like Yamaga who had "actively sown the seeds of improvement [in anime]" with Royal Space Force, it would have been better in the movie if the young told the old, "'Stand back, old men.'" Yamaga noted in response that the film showed a reality where neither generation of the Space Force saw their personal visions prevail, as the construction of the rocket and its launch only happened because of support from a government that had a different agenda from their own. "It's not about making a leap, even though from the beginning it seems that way. More than going somewhere new in a physical sense, my aim was to show something worthy in the process."

In a 1996 interview with Hiroki Azuma shortly after the original broadcast of Neon Genesis Evangelion, Hideaki Anno traced his preceding period of despair and sense of creative stagnation back to the commercial failure of Royal Space Force, which had "devastated" him. "The people who watch anime don't want that kind of work. And even among those who don't watch anime, its marketing campaign failed," asserting that his own directorial debut, Gunbuster, was an ironic response to the reception Royal Space Force had received: "Right, so [instead] send into space a robot and a half-naked girl." When Azuma asked if he had been concerned about facing the same personal collapse again with Evangelion, as it also employed the sales appeal of beautiful girls and robots, Anno laughed and said that he liked those things too. During a retrospective three years earlier with Mamoru Oshii and Yuichiro Oguro on Yoshiyuki Tomino's film Char's Counterattack, Anno had stated he regarded it as sad that he and his generation had no interest in making the kind of anime that would start a new epoch: "We don't have any 'great causes'. We don't have any 'philosophy'. What we have are our 'hobbies'. We get it, we like girls. We get it, we like those kinds of mecha. But that's all we've got." Oshii answered wryly: "Well, that's the thing about epochs; you can't deliberately set out to start a new one, you know."

In their 1993 conversation, Oshii expressed the view that Anno, although he might be capable of doing so, had not yet made an anime that was truly his own as a creator, whereas he believed Yamaga had already done so on Royal Space Force: "For better or worse, [it's] Yamaga's work." (Note: Mahiro Maeda, when asked what he thought about Royal Space Force shortly after its completion, spoke in similar terms: "I think this film's going to take a lot of hits, whether for good or bad. I think it's rare to see a movie that's so tightly made, with one director's will reaching into every corner of the film.") While Oshii felt this totality meant the work necessarily revealed all of Yamaga's shortcomings as well, (Note: Oshii expressed an extreme dislike of Riquinni's personality, calling her "the worst kind of woman for a man," although he believed that Yamaga "liked that kind of character.") and that Oshii "had a lot of problems" with the movie, nevertheless he stated that Royal Space Force had a certain impact on the idea of making an anime film, simply because no one had ever made one like it before: "It's the kind of work that I want to see. There are a lot of people, such as those at Toei or Madhouse, who are making things by refining the techniques we already have, and that's fine ... the question is though, what kind of films are we going to make with these techniques?" When asked by Oguro about what aspect of Royal Space Force he admired most, Oshii replied it was the film's "rejection of drama." "That was clear to me on the very first screening. I watched it several times again afterwards, but the more I saw it, the more I only realized that Yamaga was a man who had no intention of making drama. And I thought that was a very good thing." Oshii explained that he felt it was not necessary for films to be based in a dramatic structure, but that they could instead be used to create a world filled with mood and ideas, contrasting this in a change between his own two films Patlabor: The Movie (1989) and Patlabor 2 (1993); whereas he perceived the first as more of a drama, he saw the second as more of an essay.

=== Critical response internationally ===
==== Contemporary reviews of the English version ====
Critical reaction to the English-dubbed version of the film during its 1994–1995 theatrical release was greatly divided, with reviews differing widely on the film's plot, themes, direction, and designs. The San Jose Mercury News's Stephen Whitty gave a one-star review, writing that the film offered "nothing really original ... nothing's ever really at stake; there's never a resolution because there's never any conflict to begin with ... And there's also the same misogyny that ruins so much 'adult' animation." Whitty also perceived "self-loathing stereotypes" in the character designs: "The only characters who look remotely Japanese are comical or villainous; the hero and heroine have Caucasian features and big, cute, Hello Kitty eyes." A very similar perception was advanced by LA Village View's Sean O'Neill: "nearly all the good guys look white, with big, round, Walter Keane-style eyes, while the villains are sinister Asians, straight out of a WWII-era American movie. Is this an example of Japanese self-loathing, or does it simply underscore the international prevalence of Western standards of beauty?" Sean P. Means of The Salt Lake Tribune described it as "plodding" and "a dull piece of Japanese animation ... The filmmakers create precisely drawn images, but there's no life or passion behind them." The Dallas Morning News's Scott Bowles had a more fundamental disagreement with the film's approach as an anime, comparing it to attempts to "commercialize punk music" that instead "stripped the music of its anger, vitality and interest ... face it, anime, and the manga (Japanese comic books) that inspire them are pretty scurrilous pop art forms. Filled with perfectly sculpted heroes, large-breasted and often naked women and lots and lots of violence, they're forms best appreciated by 13-year old boys. And in trying to appeal to a broader audience, writer/director Hiroyuki Yamaga has smoothed out anime's rough edges so much that what he's left with is about as interesting as a Formica counter top," recommending instead that audiences see "a far more representative anime, Fist of the North Star ...Fist has few of the pretensions of Wings and it's driven along with an energy its better-dressed cousin never attains."

More favorable contemporary reviews tended to regard the film as unconventional while nevertheless recommending the movie to audiences. The Fort Worth Star-Telegram's Andy Grieser wrote that the film "blends provocative ideas and visual beauty ... The world of Wings is a bawdy, claustrophobic Sodom reminiscent of the hybrid Japanese-American city in 1982's Blade Runner." F.X. Feeney wrote in LA Weekly, "These strange, outsize pieces fuse and add a feeling of depth that cartoon narratives often don't obtain ... Technical brilliance aside, what gives The Wings of Honnêamise its slow-building power is the love story—a mysterious and credible one." Richard Harrington in The Washington Post viewed its two-hour length as "a bit windy" but also asserted, "Hiroyuki Yamaga's The Wings of Honnêamise is a spectacular example of Japanimation, ambitious and daring in its seamless melding of color, depth and detail." Roger Ebert of the Chicago Sun-Times gave the film three stars out of four, writing: "One of the pleasures of the film is simply enjoying Yamaga's visual imagination, as in a montage at the end, which shows the planet's suffering and turmoil," and remarked on the director's "offbeat dramatic style"... "If you're curious about anime, The Wings of Honnêamise, playing for one week at the Music Box, is a good place to start." Chris Jones of The Daily Texan gave it four stars out of five; while describing the film as "really strange," Jones nevertheless urged readers to see the film, writing, "I really liked this film more than any other animation I've seen and more than most other 'real' films. Depth and intelligence are written into it in more ways than words can describe." In the United Kingdom, Jonathan Romney, writing in The Guardian, regarded the film as the standout of an anime festival at London's National Film Theatre: "One film in the season, though, proves that anime can be complex and lyrical as well as exciting. Hiroyuki Yamaga's Wings of Honnêamise ... Creaky dubbing notwithstanding, it beats recent Disney offerings hands down." In Australia, Max Autohead of Hyper magazine rated it 10 out of 10, calling it "a cinematic masterpiece that will pave the way for more" anime of its kind.

==== Retrospectives on the film ====
Following its initial English-language release in the mid-'90s, later retrospectives on anime have had a positive view of Royal Space Force: The Wings of Honnêamise. In a 1999 issue of Time, former Film Comment editor-in-chief Richard Corliss wrote an outline on the history of anime, listing under the year 1987 the remark, "The Wings of Honnêamise is released, making anime officially an art form." In the 2006 edition of The Anime Encyclopedia, Jonathan Clements and Helen McCarthy characterized the film as "one of the shining examples of how cerebral and intelligent anime can be". Simon Richmond, in 2009's The Rough Guide to Anime, wrote that the film's "reputation has grown over time to the point where it is justly heralded as a classic of the medium". whereas in 2014's Anime, Colin Odell and Michelle Le Blanc described the film as "an example of science-fantasy anime as art-film narrative, combined with a coming-of-age drama that is intelligent and thought-provoking". In a 2017 Paste listing of the 100 best anime movies of all time, then Adult Swim senior vice president and on-air creative director Jason DeMarco ranked the film at #11, remarking, "If The Wings of Honnêamise is a 'noble failure,' it's the sort of failure many filmmakers would kill to have on their résumé." During a 2021 interview with the New York Times, science fiction author Ted Chiang, whose Nebula Award-winning "Story of Your Life" was the basis (Note: The novella was also an influence upon Kazuya Tsurumaki and Hideaki Anno in creating "The Story of Your Life", the similarly-named final episode of Gainax's OVA series Aim for the Top! 2 Diebuster, released in English under the title Gunbuster 2.) for the Denis Villeneuve movie Arrival, cited Royal Space Force as the single most impressive example of world building in book or film: "I just really was impressed by the way that the animators for that film, they invented an entirely new physical culture for this movie. The movie is not about those things, but they really fleshed out this alternate world just as the backdrop for the story that they wanted to tell."
