= The Lifecycle of Software Objects =

2010 novella by Ted Chiang

- Hardcover edition
- Author: Ted Chiang
- Original title: The Lifecycle of Software Objects
- Cover artist: Christian Pearce
- Language: English
- Genre: Science fiction novella
- Publisher: Subterranean Press
- Publication date: 2010
- Publication place: United States
- Media type: Print (Hardcover)
- Pages: 150 pp (first edition, hardback)
- ISBN: 978-1-59606-317-4 (first edition, hardback)
- OCLC: 567188308

The Lifecycle of Software Objects is a novella by American writer Ted Chiang, originally published in 2010 by Subterranean Press. It focuses on the creation of digital entities and their growth as they are raised by human trainers over the course of many years. The novella received critical praise, winning the 2011 Locus Award for Best Novella and the 2011 Hugo Award for Best Novella.

== Plot ==
Ana, a former zookeeper, begins working for software firm Blue Gamma. The firm is creating “digients”, or digital entities. The digients are designed by another Blue Gamma employee, Derek. They are relatively intelligent and have rudimentary speech; Blue Gamma begins to sell them as virtual pets.

Over the course of many years, Ana grows close to a digient named Jax. The digients become more intelligent and develop their own personalities and quirks. Eventually, Blue Gamma goes bankrupt. The digients are cut off from the wider internet. Derek and Ana disagree on the best way to raise funds to transfer the digients to a new system. Options include modifying their brain structures to serve as sexual companions for humans; using the digients as employees; or raising funds from sympathetic donors. Derek and Ana debate the nature of consent, experience, adulthood, and personhood with respect to the digients. With the consent of his digient, Derek sells the rights to a sex toy company. Ana plans to continue raising Jax, promising to discover what "adulthood" means for a digital being alongside him.

== Major themes ==
In the Los Angeles Review of Books, Joan Gordon writes that the novella explores interesting ethical questions including the meaning of consciousness, and the way in which "subjects – human or non-human – become enmeshed in and trapped by the capitalist system". The story explores this theme with digients who are treated both as company property and as individuals.

At Reactor, Elizabeth Bear compared the raising of the digients to parenthood and pet ownership. The human caretakers must balance the digients' right to self-determination and choose how many mistakes that the digients should be allowed to make.

== Style ==
Joan Gordon wrote that the tone of the novella is cool and that emotions are tamped down. This emotional distance allows the reader to take the novella's ethical questions more seriously. Elizabeth Bear felt that the story's lack of physical grounding contributed to the feeling that it takes place in a virtual setting.

== Background ==
This is Chiang's first novella released in hardcover. It is the second written work by Chiang that is long enough to stand alone, after The Merchant and the Alchemist's Gate. The tale was later included in Chiang's second collection, Exhalation: Stories, released in 2019.

The Subterreanean Press edition of the novella features ten internal paintings and cover art by Weta Workshop artist Christian Pearce. Each of the novella's ten chapters is preceded by a map designed by Jacob McMurray.

== Reception and awards ==
Author Elizabeth Bear praised the work for its discussion of complex topics relating to artificial intelligence, calling it "very peculiar ... in the absolute best way possible". Writing for Publishers Weekly, author Charles Stross praised the work, calling it a "very rare thing: a science fictional novel of ideas that delivers a real human impact".

“The Lifecycle of Software Objects” won the 2011 Locus Award for Best Novella and the 2011 Hugo Award for Best Novella.
