= Stories of Your Life and Others =

2002 short story collection by Ted Chiang

- Author: Ted Chiang
- Original title: Stories of Your Life and Others
- Language: English
- Genre: Science fiction, Fantasy
- Publisher: Tor Books
- Publication date: July 2002
- Publication place: United States
- Media type: Print (hardcover)
- Pages: 333 pp (first edition, hardback)
- ISBN: 0-7653-0418-X (first edition, hardback)
- Dewey Decimal: 813/.6

Stories of Your Life and Others is a collection of science fiction and fantasy short stories by American writer Ted Chiang published in 2002 by Tor Books. It collects Chiang's first eight stories. All of the stories except "Liking What You See: A Documentary" were previously published individually elsewhere.

The collection won the Locus Award for Best Collection in 2003.

It was reprinted in 2016 as Arrival to coincide with the adaptation of "Story of Your Life" as the film Arrival. Chiang's second collection, Exhalation: Stories was released in 2019.

== Contents ==
- "Tower of Babylon" (originally published in Omni, November 1990) (Nebula Award winner)
- "Understand" (originally published in Asimov's, August 1991)
- "Division by Zero" (originally published in Full Spectrum 3, June 1991)
- "Story of Your Life" (originally published in Starlight 2, November 1998) (Nebula Award and Theodore Sturgeon Memorial Award winner)
- "Seventy-Two Letters" (originally published in Vanishing Acts, June 2000) (Sidewise Award winner)
- "The Evolution of Human Science" (originally published as "Catching Crumbs from the Table" in Nature, June 2000)
- "Hell Is the Absence of God" (originally published in Starlight 3, July 2001) (Hugo Award, Locus Award and Nebula Award winner)
- "Liking What You See: A Documentary"
- "Story Notes" (story collection essay)

== Reception ==
Reviewing the book at the SF Site, Greg L. Johnson said that this collection shows why Chiang's stories continue to win awards. Johnson wrote that "it will not take readers new to these stories very long to appreciate their quality and beauty". He added that science fiction relies on short fiction writers to "examine new ideas and push the boundaries of the field", and Chiang has demonstrated he is "more than up to that task".

English fantasy author China Miéville wrote in a review in The Guardian that Chiang's stories in this collection "unfold with a logic that is ineluctable and compassionate". Here "humanism is inextricable from rationalism", and "it is the rationalism of the characters – and the writer – that makes them emotional and human". Miéville further said that despite the extensive use of mathematics, physics and language in the stories, they are infused with a "profound humanism" that makes "the most abstruse philosophical conjectures ... resonant and emotional".

The Guardian ranked Stories of Your Life and Others No. 80 in its list of 100 Best Books of the 21st Century.
