= Wrack & Roll =

1986 novel by Bradley Denton

Wrack & Roll, 1986 U.S. paperback

Wrack & Roll is a novel by Bradley Denton published in 1986.

== Plot summary ==
Wrack & Roll is a novel in which the Anglo-Chinese Alliance threatens nuclear war against the US/USSR in an alternate timeline 1979, and the rock band Blunt Instrument may be the only hope of stopping an apocalypse.

== Reception ==
Dave Langford reviewed Wrack & Roll for White Dwarf #94, and stated that "Can the force of music halt nuclear apocalypse? Only via unconvincing plot devices, but it's a good rousing read. Very Norman Spinrad."

== Reviews ==
- Review by Faren Miller (1986) in Locus, #309 October 1986
- Review by Constance Ash (1986) in Fantasy Review, November 1986
- Review by Don D'Ammassa (1987) in Science Fiction Chronicle, #98 November 1987
