= Seventy-Two Letters =

- Short story by Ted Chiang
- Language: English
- Genre: Science fiction

Publication
- Published in: Vanishing Acts
- Publication type: Magazine
- Publication date: June 2000

"Seventy-Two Letters" is a science fiction novella by American writer Ted Chiang, published in June 2000 in the Ellen Datlow's anthology Vanishing Acts. The novella can also be found in the anthologies Year's Best SF 6 (2001), edited by David G. Hartwell and Steampunk (2008), edited by Jeff and Ann VanderMeer. It is included in the collection Stories of Your Life and Others (2002).

== Plot summary ==
The novella focuses on an alternate history of the world where science and technology are based on the use of golems and, accordingly, the Kabbalistic names embedded in them. Biologists discover that the number of human generations is a constant value and that in about 100 years the human race will die out due to the lack of sperm in the last generation. An unexpected way out of the impasse has yet to be found.

== Reception ==
Greg Bitty of Strange Horizons wrote, ""Seventy-two Letters" is one of the finest representations of the SF subgenre of steampunk. As the "-punk" suffix suggests, steampunk, like cyberpunk, is a neologism, describing a fairly coherent collection of works which first emerged in the late 1980s. However, while cyberpunk works in a setting of late capitalist decay and anarchy, with computer technology as its primary trope, steampunk revisits nineteenth century capitalism, especially in Britain, and its primary trope is the steam engine. Chiang's work, like that of dominant authors of steampunk such as James Blaylock and Tim Powers, shares a pleasure in the game-like aspects of reworking known history; but Chiang transcends most works in the genre by starting his revision of history much earlier, reworking the entire industrial revolution in ways that manage to show us our world in new and startling ways."

== Awards ==
“Seventy-Two Letters” was nominated for the 2001 Hugo Award for Best Novella, for the 2001 World Fantasy Award for Best Novella, for the 2001 Locus Poll Award, and also for the 2001 Theodore Sturgeon Award. The novella also won the 2000 Sidewise Award for Alternate History (short form) and the 2002 Hayakawa Award.

== See also ==
- Names of God in Judaism
- Darren Aronofsky's 1998 film Pi, in which a powerful computer is used to divine the 216-character name of God.
- "The Nine Billion Names of God", a 1953 story by British writer Arthur C. Clarke.
