= Tower of Babylon (story) =

1990 science fantasy novelette by Ted Chiang

- Short story by Ted Chiang
- The 2016 cover of the published version of the story.
- Language: English
- Genre: Science fantasy

Publication
- Published in: Omni
- Publication type: Magazine
- Publication date: November 1990

"Tower of Babylon" is a science fantasy novelette by American writer Ted Chiang, first published in 1990 by Omni. The story revisits the Tower of Babel myth as a construction megaproject, in a setting where the principles of pre-scientific cosmology (flat Earth, geocentrism and the Firmament) are literally true. It is Chiang's first published work.

The story won the 1990 Nebula Award for Best Novelette, and was reprinted in Chiang's 2002 anthology, Stories of Your Life and Others.

== Plot ==
The story takes place in ancient Babylon, but set in a world where ancient Hebrew cosmology is accurate: the Earth is flat and covered by a celestial vault, harboring the Sun and the Moon in the expanse within. Humanity has been working for centuries on a huge tower to reach the vault and enter Yahweh's domain. Hillalum, the protagonist, is among a number of miners hired to pierce through the vault. Stoneworkers from Egypt experienced in working with granite have also arrived. In Babylon, a celebration has been taking place for eight days, ever since the last brick was laid.

Hillalum and the other miners begin the four-month ascent to the top of the tower through a double spiral staircase. They learn more about the society of the tower. Those higher up have never touched the ground, with entire generations living off balcony orchards. Hillalum witnesses the sun setting at the edge of the world and perceives that the dark of night is the Earth's shadow.

Reaching the trajectory of the Moon and the Sun, the scorching heat forces the team to climb during the night. They cross the field of stars, each no larger than a person, and which occasionally fall into the Earth as a literal shooting star, and learn that a star crashed into the tower long ago and cooled into "heaven-metal."

They finally reach the vault, a vast, granite-like plain. Remembering the Deluge of long ago, they worry that drilling into the vault might open a water reservoir and unleash a second Deluge, either by Yahweh's punishment or inaction. As a precaution, the excavation follows an Egyptian technique to prepare a block of granite to block the tunnel entrance in event of a flood.

Years pass as they tunnel into the vault before they indeed drill into a water reservoir and must close off the tunnel, leaving Hillalum trapped. Barely avoiding drowning, he enters the source of the water and ascends to the surface. He at first believes he is in Heaven, but learns he is back on the ground on Earth, close to where he started. Hillalum realizes that the world is, by Yahweh's construction, akin to a cylinder seal: humans perceive Heaven and Earth as separate imprints on the edges of a clay tablet, even though the imprints are next to each other on the cylinder. The tower's construction did not enrage Yahweh because it was a futile attempt all along, as He made it geometrically impossible for humans to enter Heaven. Hillalum heads back to the tower to share his discovery with the world.

== Reception ==
"Tower of Babylon" won the 1990 Nebula Award for Best Novelette, and was nominated for the 1991 Hugo Award for Best Novelette.
