= Exhalation (short story) =

- Short story by Ted Chiang
- Language: English
- Genre: Science fiction

Publication
- Published in: Eclipse 2: New Science Fiction and Fantasy
- Publication type: short story
- Publication date: November 15, 2008

"Exhalation" is a science fiction short story by American writer Ted Chiang about the second law of thermodynamics. It was first published in 2008 in the anthology Eclipse 2: New Science Fiction and Fantasy, edited by Jonathan Strahan. In 2019, the story was included in the collection of short stories Exhalation: Stories.

== Plot ==
The story takes the form of a scientist’s long journal entry. The scientist is a member of a race of air-driven mechanical beings. The race obtains air from swappable lungs filled with pressurized air (argon) from underground. When it is realized that a number of clocks simultaneously appear to be running fast but do not appear to be malfunctioning, the narrator decides to explore the explanation that people's brains are computing more slowly.

The scientist dissects his own brain and discovers that it operates based on the movement of air through tubes with small flaps of gold leaf acting as switches. The scientist hypothesizes that others' brains are computing more slowly because rising atmospheric pressure causes air to move the gold leaf at a slower rate, and that the subterranean supply of argon will eventually be depleted, equalizing the pressure between the two atmospheres.

== Reception ==
"Exhalation" won the 2009 Hugo Award for Best Short Story. The Astronomical Society of the Pacific called it a "wonderful parable", while The Encyclopedia of Science Fiction described it as "limpid" and an "elegant thought experiment". The California Sunday Magazine praised it as an "inventive meditation on death".

== See also ==
- Entropy
- Heat death of the universe
