= Buddy Holly Is Alive and Well on Ganymede =

1991 novel by Bradley Denton

Buddy Holly is Alive and Well on Ganymede
- Front cover of the 1st U.S. edition
- Author: Bradley Denton
- Cover artist: Mark Harrison
- Language: English
- Genre: Science fiction
- Publisher: William Morrow & Co
- Publication date: September 1991 (1st edition)
- Publication place: United States
- Media type: Print (hardcover)
- Pages: 359 (1st edition)
- ISBN: 0-688-10822-9

Buddy Holly is Alive and Well on Ganymede is a 1991 comedic science fiction novel by Bradley Denton.

== Plot ==
Oliver Vale was conceived on February 3, 1959, the day that iconic rock & roll singer Buddy Holly died. Exactly thirty years later, Buddy Holly appears on every television set in the world, on every channel. Holly states that he is being held on Ganymede, and that Oliver Vale is to be contacted for assistance. He then begins performing.

As a result, Vale finds himself being pursued by agents of the Federal Communications Commission, by angry television watchers, and by still more mysterious forces.

== Reception ==
Buddy Holly Is Alive and Well on Ganymede won the 1992 John W. Campbell Memorial Award for Best Science Fiction Novel.

Kirkus Reviews found it to be "illogical, uproarious, yet ultimately memorable", "riotous", and "gloriously mad", but noted that "(t)he plot doesn't add up, or even make much sense", stating that despite Denton being "an exceptionally promising new talent" (in 1991), "the parts (...) are greater than the whole". Publishers Weekly, reviewing the audiobook, described it as "quirky" with a "cockamamie and action-packed plot" and "many laugh-out-loud moments". Cory Doctorow called it "the great American comic science fiction novel".

== Copyright ==
In 2009, Denton made the novel available under a Creative Commons license.

== Adaptation ==
In August 2009, a film version of the novel was announced. It is to be titled Alive and Well and star Jon Heder. On April 11, 2011, a teaser trailer was released. The film was never released.
