= Yasumi Kobayashi =

Japanese author (1962–2020)

Yasumi Kobayashi (小林 泰三, 7 August 1962 – 23 November 2020) was a Japanese author of horror, science fiction and mystery.

== Career ==
His short story "The Man Who Watched the Sea" won the Hayakawa Award for best short story in 1998. Two more were nominated for the Seiun Award for best short story; "Sora kara Kaze ga Yamu Toki" in 2003, and "Arakajime Kettei Sareteiru Ashita" in 2004. He received the Seiun Award for novels in 2012 for Tengoku to jigoku, and in 2017 for Ultraman F. Nihon SF Taisho Award Award of Merit was awarded posthumously.

In 2009, he was nominated as "Best Foreign Author" in the Chinese-language Galaxy Awards.

== Works in English translation ==
- "C-City" (Lairs of the Hidden Gods, Volume 3: Straight to Darkness, Kurodahan Press, 2006)
- "The Man Who Watched the Sea" (Speculative Japan 2, Kurodahan Press, 2011)
