= The Evolution of Human Science =

- Short story by Ted Chiang
- Language: English
- Genre: Science fiction

Publication
- Published in: Nature
- Publication type: Magazine
- Publication date: June 2000

"The Evolution of Human Science" (also known as "Catching Crumbs from the Table") is a science fiction short story by American writer Ted Chiang, published in June 2000 in Nature. The story was also included in the collection Stories of Your Life and Others (2002).

== Plot summary ==
The story does not have any characters. The progress in the future has split humanity into two classes: ordinary people and so-called metahumans, who are genetically modified and have a much more powerful intelligence than ordinary people do. The development of the metahumans' science becomes so advanced that it forces the ordinary scientists to switch to interpreting and decoding the metahumans' achievements, because common people are no longer able to create anything fundamentally new. The science then becomes the means of seeking and establishing communication with the super-intelligent metahumans.

== Awards ==
The short story was nominated for the 2001 Locus Poll Award.

== See also ==
- "The Colonel" by Peter Watts
- Superintelligence
- Technological singularity
- Transhumanism
