= Liking What You See: A Documentary =

2002 novelette by Ted Chiang

- Short story by Ted Chiang
- Language: English
- Genre: Science fiction

Publication
- Published in: Stories of Your Life and Others
- Publication type: Book
- Publication date: 2002

"Liking What You See: A Documentary" is a science fiction novelette by American writer Ted Chiang, published in the 2002 collection Stories of Your Life and Others.

== Plot summary ==
The novelette examines the cultural effects of a noninvasive medical procedure that induces a visual agnosia toward physical beauty. The story is told as a series of interviews about a reversible procedure called calliagnosia, which eliminates a person's ability to perceive physical beauty. The story's central character is Tamera Lyons, a first-year student who grew up with calliagnosia but wants to experience life without it.

== Awards ==
| Place | Year and Award | Category |
|---|---|---|
| Nomination | 2002 Tiptree / Otherwise | Gender-bending SF |
| 2 | 2003 Locus | Best Novelette |
| Withdrawn — nomination declined | 2003 Hugo | Best Novelette |
| Finalists | 2003 Sturgeon | Best Short Science Fiction |

Chiang turned down a Hugo nomination for this story in 2003, on the grounds that the novelette was rushed due to editorial pressure and did not turn out as he had really wanted.

== Film adaptation ==
On 29 July 2017, Deadline reported that AMC announced a script based on "Liking What You See: A Documentary" is under development to create a TV series. Eric Heisserer is to be an executive producer.

== See also ==
- Fregoli delusion, a rare psychiatric disorder
