= Exhalation: Stories =

2019 collection of short stories by Ted Chiang

- Hardcover edition
- Author: Ted Chiang
- Original title: Exhalation: Stories
- Language: English
- Genre: Science fiction • fantasy
- Publisher: Alfred A. Knopf
- Publication date: May 7, 2019
- Publication place: United States
- Media type: Print, e-book, audiobook
- Pages: 368 pp (first edition, hardback)
- ISBN: 978-1101947883 (first edition, hardback)
- OCLC: 1077712105

Exhalation: Stories is a collection of short stories by American writer Ted Chiang. The book was initially released on May 7, 2019 by Alfred A. Knopf. The book was a finalist for the Los Angeles Times Book Prize inaugural Ray Bradbury Prize.

== Background ==
This is Ted Chiang's second collection of short works, after the 2002 book Stories of Your Life and Others. Exhalation: Stories contains nine stories exploring such issues as humankind's place in the universe, the nature of humanity, bioethics, virtual reality, free will and determinism, time travel, and the uses of robotic forms of A.I. Seven tales were initially published between 2005 and 2015; "Omphalos" and "Anxiety is the Dizziness of Freedom" are originals.

== Contents ==
- "The Merchant and the Alchemist's Gate" (originally published by Subterranean Press in 2007; Nebula Award, Hugo Award, and Seiun Award winner)
- "Exhalation" (originally published in Eclipse 2 in 2008; BSFA, Locus Award, and Hugo Award winner)
- "What's Expected of Us" (originally published in Nature, Volume 436 Issue 7047, 6 July 2005)
- "The Lifecycle of Software Objects" (originally published by Subterranean Press in 2010; Hugo Award and Locus Award winner)
- "Dacey's Patent Automatic Nanny" (originally published in The Thackery T. Lambshead Cabinet of Curiosities (edited by Jeff VanderMeer and Ann VanderMeer) June 2011, Harper Voyages)
- "The Truth of Fact, the Truth of Feeling" (originally published by Subterranean Press Magazine, August 2013; Hugo Award finalist)
- "The Great Silence" (originally published by e-flux journal, 2015)
- "Omphalos" (Locus Award winner, Hugo Award finalist)
- "Anxiety Is the Dizziness of Freedom" (Hugo Award and Nebula Award finalist)

== Reception ==
Joyce Carol Oates for The New Yorker stated, "From technological ingenuity flows ethical intricacy. The stories in "Exhalation" are mostly not so magically inventive as those in Chiang's first collection, but each is still likely to linger in the memory the way riddles may linger—teasing, tormenting, illuminating, thrilling." Kirkus Reviews gave it a starred review, adding, "Visionary speculative stories that will change the way readers see themselves and the world around them: This book delivers in a big way."

Constance Grady of Vox gave the book four points of five, commenting, "The stories in Exhalation are a shining example of science fiction at its best. They take both science and humanism deeply seriously, which is why it's so satisfying to watch Chiang's shining, intricate machine at work: You know that whatever the machine builds, it will tell you something new about human beings." Adam Morgan of The A.V. Club mentioned, "But if anything in this book has a shot at becoming the next Arrival, it's the 70-page novella that closes the collection, "Anxiety Is The Dizziness Of Freedom."

Publishers Weekly stated, "These nine stories introduce life-changing inventions and new worlds with radically different physical laws. In each, Chiang produces deeply moving drama from fascinating first premises." The book was named one of the top ten books of 2019 by The New York Times Book Review.

The collection was also included on President Barack Obama's 2019 Summer Reading List.
