= Finisterra (novelette) =

- Short story by David Moles
- Language: English
- Genre(s): Science fiction novelette

Publication
- Published in: Fantasy & Science Fiction
- Publication type: Magazine
- Publication date: December 2007

"Finisterra" is a science fiction novelette by American writer David Moles, originally published in the December 2007 of The Magazine of Fantasy and Science Fiction. It won the 2008 Theodore Sturgeon Memorial Award, and was nominated for the 2008 Hugo Award for Best Novelette.

== Plot summary ==
The story follows Bianca Nazario, an aeronautical engineer who grew up on Earth as a minority Christian living under an Islamic government. After her parents die and her brothers get married she takes a contract on the planet of Sky to help poachers kill Zaratanes - mountain sized beasts floating above the planet. Soon after arrival she witnesses the destruction of a Zaratan, as well as the brutality of her employer, and must decide whether to truly help the poachers or not.
