= David Moles =

American novelist

- Born: California
- Occupation: Writer
- Writing career
- Genre: Science fiction
- Website: chrononaut.org

David Moles is an American science fiction and fantasy writer. He won the 2008 Theodore Sturgeon Award for his novelette "Finisterra", which was also a finalist for the 2008 Hugo Award for Best Novelette. He was a finalist for the 2004 John W. Campbell Award.

== Life ==
Moles was born in California and raised in a number of cities, including San Diego, Athens, Tehran, and Tokyo. He attended the American School in Japan before receiving undergraduate and advanced degrees from the University of California, Santa Cruz and University of Oxford.

== Writing ==
Moles began writing science fiction and fantasy in 2002. He is best known for his short fiction, which has been published in a number of book anthologies and magazines including Asimov's Science Fiction, Fantasy & Science Fiction, Strange Horizons, and many more. Moles has won the Theodore Sturgeon Award and has been finalist for the Hugo Award, the World Fantasy Award, and the John W. Campbell Award for Best New Writer.

In 2006, after Harlan Ellison groped award-winning novelist Connie Willis' breast while on stage at the Anaheim Worldcon Hugo Awards ceremony, Moles condemned fellow SF authors who defended Ellison's actions. However, the quotes Moles used in his blog post were from a private Science Fiction and Fantasy Writers of America newsgroup, and members attempted to expel Moles from the organization for "breaking the SFWA code of silence." Moles credits then SFWA president Robin Wayne Bailey for reducing his expulsion to censure, "a new process that had to be invented for the occasion."

== Awards ==
| Year | Title | Award | Category | Result | Ref |
|---|---|---|---|---|---|
| 2005 | "The Third Party" | Asimov's Readers' Poll | Best Novelette | 4 | |
| 2005 | — | John W. Campbell Award for Best New Writer | — | 5 | |
| 2006 | — | John W. Campbell Award for Best New Writer | — | Nominations Below Cutoff | |
| 2007 | Twenty Epics | World Fantasy Award | Anthology | Nominate | |
| 2008 | "Finisterra" | Theodore Sturgeon Award | — | Won | |
| 2008 | "Finisterra" | Hugo Awards | Best Novelette | 5 | |
| 2008 | "Finisterra" | Locus Award | Best Novelette | Nominated—18th | |
| 2011 | Seven Cities of Gold | Hugo Awards | Best Novella | Nominations Below Cutoff | |
| 2011 | Seven Cities of Gold | Locus Award | Best Novella | Nominated—17th | |
| 2022 | The Metric | Locus Award | Best Novelette | Nominated—27th | |
| 2022 | The Metric | Theodore Sturgeon Award | — | Finalist | |

== Bibliography ==
=== Chapterbook ===
- Seven Cities of Gold, PS Publishing, 2010. Reprinted in The Year's Best Science Fiction: Twenty-Eighth Annual Collection, edited by Gardner Dozois.

=== Anthologies ===
- All-Star Zeppelin Adventure Stories (2004), editor, with Jay Lake
- Twenty Epics (2006), editor, with Susan Marie Groppi. Finalist for the 2007 World Fantasy Award—Anthology.

=== Short stories ===
- "Theo's Girl" - Polyphony 2 (2003)
- "Fetch" - Strange Horizons (2003)
- "The Memory of Water" - Strange Horizons (2003)
- "Five Irrational Histories" - Rabid Transit: Petting Zoo (2004)
- "The Ideas" - Flytrap #2, 2004
- "The Third Party" - Asimov's Science Fiction (September 2004). Reprinted in The Year's Best Science Fiction: Twenty-Second Annual Collection, edited by Gardner Dozois.
- "Planet of the Amazon Women" - Strange Horizons (2005). Reprinted in The Year's Best Science Fiction: Twenty-Third Annual Collection, edited by Gardner Dozois.
- "Finisterra" - The Magazine of Fantasy & Science Fiction (December 2007). Finalist for the 2008 Hugo Award for Best Novelette, and winner of the 2008 Theodore Sturgeon Award. Reprinted in The Year's Best Science Fiction: Twenty-Fifth Annual Collection, edited by Gardner Dozois.
- "Down and Out in the Magic Kingdom" - Eclipse Two: New Science Fiction and Fantasy (2010), edited by Jonathan Strahan.
- "A Soldier of the City" - Engineering Infinity (December 2010), edited by Jonathan Strahan. Reprinted in The Year's Best Science Fiction: Twenty-Ninth Annual Collection, edited by Gardner Dozois, and War & Space: Recent Combat, edited by Rich Horton and Sean Wallace.
- "Chitai Heiki Koronbin" - The Future Is Japanese (2012), edited by Nick Mamatas and Masumi Washington.
