= Hell Is the Absence of God =

2001 novelette by Ted Chiang

- Short story by Ted Chiang
- Country: United States
- Language: English
- Genre: Fantasy

Publication
- Published in: Starlight #3
- Publication type: Anthology
- Publisher: Tor Books
- Publication date: July 2001

"Hell Is the Absence of God" is a 2001 satirical fantasy novelette by American writer Ted Chiang, first published in Starlight #3, and subsequently reprinted in Year's Best Fantasy 2, and in Fantasy: The Best of 2001, as well as in Chiang's 2002 anthology, Stories of Your Life and Others.

"Hell Is the Absence of God" won the 2002 Hugo Award for Best Novelette, the Nebula Award for Best Novelette, and the Locus Award for Best Novelette. It was also a finalist for the 2002 Theodore Sturgeon Award. It has been translated into Japanese, Italian, Spanish, French, Russian, German, Ukrainian and Romanian.

== Plot summary ==
... if [people] wish to love God, they [must] be prepared to do so no matter what His intentions. God is not just, God is not kind, God is not merciful, and understanding that is essential to true devotion.

— "Hell Is the Absence of God", page 189

The story is set in a world where the existence of God, souls, Heaven, and Hell are obvious and indisputable, and where miracles and angelic visitations are commonplace—albeit not necessarily benevolent. The story primarily focuses on Neil Fisk, a widower whose wife, Sarah, is killed by the collateral damage of an angel's visitation. Sarah's soul was seen ascending to Heaven, leading the non-devout Neil to seek the love and devotion needed to please God and enter Heaven to reunite with her.

The story also follows Janice Reilly, a woman born without legs who is made able-bodied in an angelic visitation. Janice, a motivational and spiritual speaker, is met with a mediocre response during a meeting after her visitation when she suggests that her gift is a test of her devotion to God rather than a blessing. This greatly angers Neil, who was present.

The reader is then introduced to Ethan Mead, who cannot discern the meaning of an angelic encounter he experienced. This begins to take a toll on his marriage, but Ethan desperately seeks help with his predicament. He eventually meets Janice, who has decided to organize a pilgrimage to one of the few holy sites on Earth where visitations are frequent. Wanting to return her blessing, her story makes the news, convincing Neil that the only way to enter Heaven is by witnessing Heaven's light.

In the past, many people who have witnessed Heaven's light, which appears when an angel enters and exits the mortal world, ascend to Heaven no matter the amount or severity of their sins. Sure enough, an angel appears and flies over the holy site. The many pilgrims present desperately attempt to witness Heaven's light by following the angel. Neil is following in a truck, but crashes and is left mortally wounded. Janice and Ethan attempt to help him, but as the angel leaves Earth, Heaven's light strikes Neil and Janice.

Both are left blind and Neil dies. Much to his shock, Ethan witnesses Neil's soul descend to Hell. Janice goes on a speaking tour where she describes her experience and the beauty of Heaven. Ethan becomes a minister after deciding the purpose of his first visitation was to lead him to meet Neil and reveal to the world that exposure to Heaven's light does not guarantee entrance into Heaven.

In Hell, Neil, having finally gained the love and devotion to God that he desperately sought, accepts he will never reunite with Sarah and will spend eternity in the absence of God.

== Background ==
Commenting on "Hell Is the Absence of God" in the "Story Notes" section of Stories of Your Life and Others, Chiang said that after seeing the film The Prophecy, he wanted to write a story about angels, but could not think of a scenario which would work. It was only when he started imagining angels as being "phenomena of terrifying power, whose visitations resembled natural disasters" that he was able to proceed. Chiang said the Book of Job also contributed to ideas for his story, as it raised the question: why did God restore Job to prosperity when the Book's lesson was that "virtue isn't always rewarded"?

In interviews, Chiang has explicitly stated that "Hell Is the Absence of God" is "straight fantasy", because it takes place in a universe "in which the scientific method doesn't work". He said it is about "innocent suffering", and the way people devoted to God deal with it. He also said the novelette examines the role of faith in religion, and suggests that if God undeniably existed, then faith would no longer be applicable.

== Reception ==
Robert J. Sawyer and David G. Hartwell described "Hell Is the Absence of God" as the "best single SF story of 2002". Conversely, John C. Wright called it "trite antichristian propaganda". Elf Sternberg has compared the novelette to C. S. Lewis's The Great Divorce, saying that although Lewis is a supporter of God, Chiang is "far more ambivalent".

In a review of Chiang's Stories of Your Life and Others in The Guardian, English fantasy author China Miéville called "Hell Is the Absence of God" the showpiece of Chiang's collection. He wrote that despite the story's religious underpinnings, there is no "moralistic Sturm und Drang", and Chiang "does not descend to the finger-wagging one might expect from a liberal intellectual".

Ken Liu wrote "Single-Bit Error", a short story published in 2009, in response to "Hell Is the Absence of God".

== Awards ==
Award	Year	Result	Refs
Seiun Award	2004	Won	
Nebula Award for Best Novelette	2002	Won	
Locus Award for Best Novelette	2002	Won	
Hugo Award for Best Novelette	2002	Won	
Theodore Sturgeon Award	2002	Finalist	
Kurd Laßwitz Award for Best Foreign Work	2013	Won	

== Publication history ==
Date	Title	Author/Editor	Language	Type
July 2001	Starlight 3	Patrick Nielsen Hayden	English	Anthology
June 2002	Fantasy: The Best of 2001	Robert Silverberg, Karen Haber	English	Anthology
July 2002	Stories of Your Life and Others	Ted Chiang	English	Collection
July 2002	Year's Best Fantasy 2	David G. Hartwell, Kathryn Cramer	English	Anthology
April 2003	I premi Hugo 2002	Gianfranco Viviani	Italian	Anthology
March 2004	Nebula Awards Showcase 2004	Vonda N. McIntyre	English	Anthology
July 2004	The Locus Awards: Thirty Years of the Best in Science Fiction and Fantasy	Charles N. Brown, Jonathan Strahan	English	Anthology
April 2006	La tour de Babylone	Ted Chiang	French	Collection
June 2006	Feeling Very Strange: The Slipstream Anthology	James Patrick Kelly, John Kessel	English	Anthology
February 2008	Sci-Fi Magazin	Ted Chiang	Romanian	Magazine
December 2011	Die Hölle ist die Abwesenheit Gottes	Ted Chiang	German	Collection
2011	Împărțirea la zero	Ted Chiang	Romanian	Collection

- Source: Internet Speculative Fiction Database

== Works cited ==
- Chiang, Ted (2015a) [2002]. "Hell Is the Absence of God". Stories of Your Life and Others (e-book ed.). Picador. p. 164. ISBN 978-1-4472-8198-6.
- Chiang, Ted (2015b) [2002]. "Story Notes". Stories of Your Life and Others (e-book ed.). Picador. p. 223. ISBN 978-1-4472-8198-6.
