= Tantie Merle and the Farmhand 4200 =

2023 short story by R. S. A. Garcia

"Tantie Merle and the Farmhand 4200" is a 2023 science fiction short story by Trinidadian author R. S. A. Garcia. It was first published in Uncanny Magazine.

== Synopsis ==
An elderly Trinidadian woman is given a robotic farmhand made of nanotechnology, with unexpected results — including that it is repeatedly eaten by her goat.

== Reception ==
"Tantie Merle and the Farmhand 4200" won the Nebula Award for Best Short Story of 2023 and the 2024 Theodore Sturgeon Memorial Award.

== Origin ==
Garcia has described the story as having been inspired by an online conversation about how goats will eat anything.
