= The Truth of Fact, the Truth of Feeling =

2013 short story by Ted Chiang

- Short story by Ted Chiang
- Country: United States
- Language: English
- Genre: Science fiction

Publication
- Published in: Subterranean Press
- Publication type: Periodical
- Media type: Magazine
- Publication date: January 1, 2013

"The Truth of Fact, the Truth of Feeling" is a science fiction story by American writer Ted Chiang. It was first published in 2013 in Subterranean Press.

The story is written as an article by an unnamed journalist in the near future, who tells his experience with a device that endows its users with eidetic memory, interspersed with a fictionalized account of an incident in which writing was introduced to an African tribe. The story serves as a reflection of how improving human memory affects people's personal lives.

== Plot ==
=== Jijingi's tale ===
In the 20th century, Christian missionary Moseby introduces writing to a 13-year-old Tiv boy named Jijingi. He gradually discovers its mixed effects on storytelling, accuracy, speech perception, and thought organization.

At age 20, Jijingi is asked by elder Sabe to work as a scribe in legal disputes, where Moseby disapprovingly discovers that the Tiv condone lying in court if it is for a good cause. By the Europeans' demand, the Tiv are expected to rearrange their clans. A dispute ensues, where Jijingi's clan of Shangev wants to join Kwande's, claiming to be the closest.

Jijingi and Moseby discover European records disproving the claim of the Shangev clan. Upon learning this, Sabe disagrees and expresses to Jijingi his concern about going astray from the Tiv ways by valuing accuracy over morality. Ashamed, Jijingi keeps working as a scribe but burns his diary.

=== The journalist's article ===
In the near future, lifelogging and retinal projectors have been commonplace for years, and the release of Remem, a search algorithm, effectively grants users eidetic memory. A journalist comments on how Remem will be beneficial for work but opines that its effect on relationships will be largely detrimental.

Despite interviewing a couple who welcome the device as a way to settle arguments and a spokesperson for the maker of Remem, the journalist remains adamant that forgetfulness is essential for forgiving and making personal narratives. For example, he is grateful to have forgotten most arguments with his daughter Nicole when she was a teenager. In particular, he holds in high regard a memory in which Nicole blamed him for her mother's divorce, which prompted him to work on their relationship.

The journalist tries out Remem, but as he seldom lifelogs, he is permitted to access other people's records. Scouting Nicole's lifelog, he is shocked to discover that it was he who blamed Nicole for the divorce. He meets up with her to apologize, but she is amused that he misremembered so badly and annoyed about his self-centeredness and victimism.

Although still skeptical, the journalist admits that at least Remem will allow people to form truthful personal narratives. He also reveals that Jijingi's story is loosely based on a real incident. Still unsure of his article's accuracy, he makes the meeting with Nicole public and invites the reader to make their own judgements.

== Reception ==
"Truth" was a finalist for the 2014 Hugo Award for Best Novelette. Charlie Jane Anders compared it to Black Mirror, and Gary K. Wolfe described it as a "deeply thoughtful meditation". Strange Horizons assessed the narrator's tone as "imperfect" and a "mimicry" of journalism, with the near-future narrative "overreach(ing)" and "fail(ing) to find its balance", and plot revelations that feel "unbelievable rather than shocking", while Tor.com called it "compelling" and "an elegant, technical piece", but conceded that it is "slow moving".
