= R. S. A. Garcia =

Trinidadian science fiction writer

- Born: Trinidad
- Occupation: Writer
- Website: rsagarcia.com

R. S. A. Garcia is a Trinidadian writer. In 2024, she won a Nebula Award, speculative fiction's most prestigious prize, for her short story "Tantie Merle and the Farmhand 4200," making her the first writer from Trinidad and Tobago to win a Nebula in any category.

== Life and career ==
R. S. A. Garcia is from Trinidad where she lives and works. In 2015 she won the Independent Publishers Book Awards Silver Medal for Best Scifi/Fantasy/Horror Ebook. She has written both novels and short stories published in international magazines.

== Bibliography ==
- Douen Mother (Abyss and Apex Magazine as R.S. Garcia)
- Lex Talionis (2014) Dragonwell. ISBN 978-1-940076-12-6.
- The Bois (Truancy)
- The Anchorite Wakes (Clarkesworld Magazine)
- The Sun from Both Sides (Clarkesworld Magazine)
- Fire in His Eyes, Blood on His Teeth (Devil's Ways)
- Philia, Eros, Storge, Agàpe, Pragma (Clarkesworld Magazine)

== External ==
- Official website
- R. S. A. Garcia at the Internet Speculative Fiction Database
- R. S. A. Garcia at Goodreads
- Profile on Uncanny Magazine
