= Sergeant Chip =

- Short story by Bradley Denton
- Language: English
- Genre(s): science fiction novella

Publication
- Published in: The Magazine of Fantasy & Science Fiction
- Publication type: Magazine
- Publication date: September 2004

"Sergeant Chip" is a science fiction novella by American writer Bradley Denton, originally published in The Magazine of Fantasy & Science Fiction issue of September 2004. It was the winner of the 2005 Sturgeon Award, and was nominated for the 2005 Hugo Award for Best Novella.

== Plot summary ==
The story is told from the point of view of Chip, a specially trained military dog that has been implanted with a microchip that allows him to communicate with his trainer, Captain Dial. The two of them put on many military demonstrations until they are called to active duty in the war. In the war they are caught in an unexpected ambush and eventually come to realize who the "real" enemy is.
