= The Merchant and the Alchemist's Gate =

- Short story by Ted Chiang
- Language: English
- Genre: Fantasy

Publication
- Published in: The Merchant and the Alchemist's Gate
- Publication type: Short story, Novelette
- Publisher: Subterranean Press
- Publication date: July 2007
- Award: Nebula Award (2007); Hugo Award (2008)

"The Merchant and the Alchemist's Gate" is an Arabian Nights-type fantasy short story, or novelette, by American writer Ted Chiang. It was originally published in 2007 by Subterranean Press and reprinted in the September 2007 issue of Fantasy & Science Fiction. In 2019, it was reprinted in his second collection, Exhalation: Stories.

== Plot summary ==
Fuwaad ibn Abbas, a fabric merchant in medieval Baghdad, recounts his life story to the Caliph. He had discovered a new shop in the market, whose owner, Bashaarat, shows him a circular black portal (the "Gate of Years") that functions as a gateway 20 years into the future.

Bashaarat had recently come from Cairo, where he had built an identical Gate over 20 years before. Before offering Fuwaad use of the Gate, he recites three stories of people who have time traveled to meet their future selves.

In the first tale, the rope-maker Hassan is told by his future self where to find buried treasure that will make him wealthy. The future Hassan, of course, gained the information from this very exchange in his own past.

In the second tale, a man named Ajib sees that his future self is impoverished, yet hoarding a large chest of gold. Reasoning that his older version does not deserve the gold, he steals it and commences an ostentatious lifestyle, marrying a woman he had long fancied. But his new wife is kidnapped and he is forced to ransom the rest of the gold for her safe return. He now knows he must spend the next 20 years scrimping to earn back the gold, in order that it will be available for his younger version to steal.

In the third tale, Hassan's wife Raniya secretly travels forward and backward in time to protect her husband when the original owners of the treasure he found attempt to reclaim it. She also realizes she must teach him to be a good lover in preparation for when her younger self will meet him.

Fuwaad wants to travel to the past rather than the future, because he had argued with his wife before leaving on a trip, then returned to find she had been killed in an accident. However, since the Gate in Baghdad has just been built, the exit point won't exist until 20 years later. Thus, Fuwaad has to travel to Cairo (by caravan, taking several weeks) to use Bashaarat's Gate there.

On meeting the younger Bashaarat, Fuwaad realizes his arrival in the past was what led to Bashaarat going to Baghdad in the first place. Fuwaad then begins his own journey back to Baghdad, but is delayed and robbed, causing him to miss his wife's death by one day. A nurse gives him a message from his wife that she loved him (which would explain why his past self did not receive that message at the time).

Wandering the city in grief, with no possessions and not recognized by anyone, Fuwaad is arrested and jailed. After correctly foretelling an unlikely event, he is brought before the Caliph where he offers to describe more future events, but warns that the future cannot be changed.

== Background ==
In a section called "Story Notes" at the back of Exhalation, Chiang reports that he was inspired to write about "time doors" of the sort depicted in the story by attending a presentation by physicist Kip Thorne in the 1990s. It later occurred to him that the "recursive nature of time-travel stories" had a natural affinity to the "tales within tales" structure of the Arabian Nights.

== Reception ==
Publishers Weekly wrote a positive review for the story, calling it "skillfully written".

Kirkus Reviews commented specifically on "The Merchant and the Alchemist's Gate" in its starred review of Chiang's collection Exhalation: Stories, calling it "an instant classic".

It won the 2008 Hugo Award for Best Novelette and the 2007 Nebula Award for Best Novelette.

It was a finalist for the 2008 Theodore Sturgeon Award.
