= Bradley Denton =

American science fiction author

- Born: Bradley Clayton Denton; 1958 (age 67–68); Towanda, Kansas, U.S.
- Education: University of Kansas (BA, MA)
- Occupation: Author
- Spouse: Barbara
- Writing career
- Genres: Science fiction; black comedy
- Website: bradleydenton.net/index.html

Bradley Clayton Denton (born 1958) is an American science fiction author. He has also written other types of fiction, such as the black comedy of his novel Blackburn, about a sympathetic serial killer.

He was born in Towanda, Kansas, and attended the University of Kansas at Lawrence and graduated with degrees in astronomy (B.A.) and English (M.A.). His first published work was the short story "The Music of the Spheres", published in The Magazine of Fantasy & Science Fiction in March 1984. His collection The Calvin Coolidge Home for Dead Comedians and A Conflagration Artist won the 1995 World Fantasy Award for Best Collection.

He and his wife Barbara moved from Kansas to Austin, Texas in 1988.

== Books ==
- Sergeant Chip & Other Novellas (collection, 2014)
- Laughin' Boy (novel, 2005)
- One Day Closer to Death: Eight Stabs at Immortality (collection, 1998); all but one of the stories in here appeared in either The Calvin Coolidge Home for Dead Comedians or A Conflagration Artist
- Lunatics (novel, 1996)
- Blackburn (novel, 1993, was nominated for the 1993 Bram Stoker Award)
- The Calvin Coolidge Home for Dead Comedians (collection, 1993, won the 1995 World Fantasy Award for Best Collection)
- A Conflagration Artist (collection, 1993, won the 1995 World Fantasy Award for Best Collection)
- Buddy Holly Is Alive and Well on Ganymede (novel, 1991, won the John W. Campbell Memorial Award for Best Science Fiction Novel for 1992)
- Wrack & Roll (novel, 1986, a nominee for the John W. Campbell Memorial Award for Best Science Fiction Novel)

== Selected short stories ==
- "Blood Moccasins" (2013, Impossible Monsters, edited by Kasey Lansdale, Subterranean Press)
- “The Adakian Eagle” (2011, Down These Strange Streets, edited by George R. R. Martin and Gardner Dozois, Edgar Award nominee)
- "Blackburn and the Blade" (2006, Joe R. Lansdale's Lords of the Razor, edited by Bill Sheehan and William Schafer, Subterranean Press; 2007 International Horror Guild Award nominee)
- "Sergeant Chip" (September 2004, The Magazine of Fantasy & Science Fiction, 2005 Theodore Sturgeon Memorial Award winner)
- "Timmy and Tommy's Thanksgiving Secret" (2003, in the collection Witpunk)
- "Bloody Bunnies" (April 2000, The Magazine of Fantasy & Science Fiction)
- "We Love Lydia Love" (November 1994, The Magazine of Fantasy & Science Fiction)
- "The Territory" (July 1992 The Magazine of Fantasy & Science Fiction, a 1993 nominee for both the Hugo Award for Best Novella and Nebula Award for Best Novella)
- "The Sin-Eater of the Kaw" (June 1989, The Magazine of Fantasy & Science Fiction)
- "The Calvin Coolidge Home for Dead Comedians" (June 1988, The Magazine of Fantasy & Science Fiction)
- "In the Fullness of Time" (May 1986, The Magazine of Fantasy & Science Fiction)
- "The Summer We Saw Diana" (August 1985, The Magazine of Fantasy & Science Fiction)
- "Top of the Charts" (March 1985, The Magazine of Fantasy & Science Fiction)
- "The Music of the Spheres" (March 1984, The Magazine of Fantasy & Science Fiction)
