= Understand (story) =

- Short story by Ted Chiang
- Audiobook cover
- Language: English
- Genre: Science fiction

Publication
- Published in: Asimov's Science Fiction
- Publication type: Magazine
- Publication date: August 1991

"Understand" is a science fiction novelette by American writer Ted Chiang, published in 1991. It was nominated for the 1992 Hugo Award for Best Novelette, and won the 1992 Asimov’s Reader Poll.

The story has been recorded by Rhashan Stone and broadcast as a four-part series on BBC Radio 7.

In June 2024, it was revealed the story is being adapted into a TV show with Gus Van Sant being attached to direct.

== Plot ==
The story follows a man who is given an experimental drug to heal brain damage caused by anoxia after he nearly drowns. The drug regenerates his damaged neurons and has the unintended side effect of exponentially improving his intellect and motor skills. As he gets smarter and smarter, he is pursued by several government agencies. Eventually he receives a message from another super-intelligent test subject with whom he enters into conflict. When he tries to induce an aneurysm in the other, the latter appears to be way ahead of him, having acquired knowledge about lethal thoughts. Being told he was exposed days earlier, he understands what happened, constructs the thought, and dies.

== See also ==
- Superintelligence
- Transhumanism
- Flowers for Algernon
