= Aya Takano =

Japanese artist (born 1976)

- タカノ綾
- Born: December 22, 1976 (age 49); Saitama (city)
- Education: Tama Art University
- Occupations: painter, Superflat artist, manga artist, and science fiction essayist
- Style: Superflat

Aya Takano (タカノ綾, Takano Aya; born December 22, 1976) is a Japanese painter, Superflat artist, manga artist, and science fiction essayist. Aya Takano is represented by Kaikai Kiki, the artistic production studio created in 2001 by Takashi Murakami.

== Early life and influence ==
Takano was born in Saitama, Japan. She spent her childhood reading her father's library, which consisted of many books on natural sciences and science fiction. Exotic animals and landforms combined with an urban city are common themes in her artwork, and are intended to show the juxtaposition between future and fantasy. Takano cited in a documentary made by the Galerie Emmanuel Perrotin that she was always fascinated by the unusual forms of nature and animal life, and desires to have such shapes represented in her work.

Osamu Tezuka's science fiction was also an early influence in Takano's life, and had a lasting impact on her dreamy perception of the world. She cites in the book Drop Dead Cute by Ivan Vartanian, that she really believed everything she read was true until she was nineteen. Takano states that sometimes even now she imagines possessing the ability to fly and is uninterested in the constrictions of being grounded.

When it was time for her to start thinking about college, Takano told her parents she wouldn't attend unless she was allowed to enter an art program. In 2000, she received a bachelor's degree from Tama Art University in Tokyo, and, soon after, became an assistant for leading Japanese Contemporary Artist Takashi Murakami, the founder of the Superflat art movement, who became her first mentor and jump-started her career.

== Development of style ==
Murakami was looking to exhibit the work of young artists and to help create an artistic community for like-minded artists that used the Superflat style. The Superflat movement, popularized by Murakami himself, is about emphasizing the two dimensionality of figures, which is influenced by Japanese manga and anime, while dually exposing the fetishes of Japanese consumerism. Through the basic ideas of this movement, he created the Kaikai Kiki Co., a group where five out of the seven members are women.

In the 1980s, the look of pre-pubescent girls became the target of consumer culture in Japanese society. This infantilization and objectification of the female was seen most heavily in Japan's otaku culture. Japanese female artists like Takano seek to reinvent the otaku culture through a feminine perspective. Takano in particular is interested in depicting how the future will impact the role of the female heroine in society. Her figures, often androgynous, float through her alternate realities partially clothed or fully nude. Takano denies that she is trying to reveal anything specific about sex, but rather, with the slim bodies, bulbous heads, and large eyes, she is trying to emphasize her figures' temporary suspension from adulthood; the redness on the figures' joints, such as the elbows, knees, and shoulders, is supposed to convey that they are still engaged in the growing process, mentally and physically. Takano's playful and ambiguous visions of the future, especially one which revolves around the feminine, serves as a way for her to create her own mythology, free from the chains of reality. She is represented by Galerie Perrotin, Hong Kong and Paris.

== Solo exhibitions ==
2015

- The Ocean Inside, The Flowers Inside", Johyun Gallery, Busan, South Korea

2014

- "La Maison d'Aya", BIBO, Hong Kong

2012

- "Heaven Is Inside Of You", Galerie Perrotin, Hong Kong
- "To Lose Is To Gain", Galerie Perrotin, Paris, France

2011

- SieboldHuis, Leiden, Netherlands

2010

- "Rooms of the World", Kaikai Kiki Gallery, Taipei, Taiwan
- "Aya Takano", Museum Frieder Burda, Baden-Baden, Germany
- Hong Kong Art Fair, Booth Galerie Emmanuel Perrotin, Hong Kong

2009

- Reintegrating Worlds," Skarstedt Gallery, New York City

2008

- "Toward Eternity" Galerie Emmanuel Perrotin, Paris, France

2007

- "Wild dogs, hawks, owls, cats, a landfill the size of 44 and a half Tokyo Domes, the stratosphere", Galerie Emmanuel Perrotin, Miami, USA
- "Tradition and modernity", curated by Hélène Kelmachter, Miró Foundation, Barcelona, Spain

2006

- "Aya Takano", Musée d'Art Contemporain, Lyon, France
- "City Dog", Parco Gallery, Tokyo, Japan; Parco Gallery, Nagoya, Japan

2005

- Frieze Art Fair, London, United Kingdom
- "The Far Reaches of The Universe, My Garden", Blum & Poe Gallery, Santa Monica, United States

2004

- "Aya Takano, a web project for Digital Gallery", Museum of Contemporary Art, Los Angeles, United States
- Naoki Takizawa for Issey Miyake, 2004-5 Autumn Winter Collection, Paris, Tokyo (collaboration)

2003

- Galerie Emmanuel Perrotin, Paris, France

2002

- Space Ship EE, nanogalerie, Paris, France

2000

- "Hot Banana Fudge", NADiff, Tokyo, Japan

1997

- "SHU WA KIMASERI", shop33, Tokyo, Japan

== Group exhibitions ==
2010

- "Garden of Painting Japanese Art of the 00s," The National Museum of Art, Osaka, Japan

2009

- "VRAOUM!", La Maison Rouge, Paris, France

2008

- "Quando vidas se tornam forma – Panorama da arte contemporanea brasileira e japonesa," Museu de Arte Moderna, São Paulo, Brazil; Museu Oscar Niemeyer, Curitiba, Brazil

"Kaikai Kiki Artists," Kaikai Kiki Gallery, Tokyo, Japan

2007

- "Kawaii! Japan now", Foundation Joan Miró, Barcelona, Spain
- "The Door to Summer", Art Tower Mito, Mito, Japan

2006

- "Spank the Monkey", Baltic Centre for Contemporary Art, Gateshead, United Kingdom
- Etoile, Xavel, Inc. (Virtual department store design)
- "Aya Takano, Chiho Aoshima, Chinatsu Ban Exhibition", Mizuho Oshiro Gallery, Kagoshima, Japan

2005

- Aoi Gallery, Osaka, Japan
- "Japan Pop", Helsinki Museum of Art, Helsinki, Finland
- "The Sensual Line", Museum der Moderne Salzburg, Salzburg, Austria
- "Little Boy: The Arts of Japan's Exploding Subculture", Japan Society, New York, United States (curated by Takashi Murakami)
- MTA Subway Poster Design, Public Art Fund and Japan Society, New York, United States
- "What's Good Conference", Hong Kong Art Centre, Hong Kong (Lecture), China
- Galerie Emmanuel Perrotin, Paris, France

2004

- "T-Junction", Galerie Emmanuel Perrotin, Paris, France
- "Fiction. Love: Ultra New Vision in Contemporary Art", Museum of Contemporary Art, Taipei, Taiwan
- "Chiho Aoshima, Mr., Aya Takano", Galerie Emmanuel Perrotin at LFL Gallery, New York, USA
- "Tokyo Girls Bravo", Marianne Boesky Gallery, New York, USA

2003

- "Girls Don't Cry", Parco Gallery, Tokyo, Japan
- Naoki Takizawa for Issey Miyake, Tokyo (collaboration), Japan
- "Hope—The Future is in Our Hands", LaForet Harajuku, Tokyo

2002

- "The Japanese Experience – Inevitable", Das Museum der Moderne Salzburg, Salzburg, Austria
- "Tokyo Girls Bravo 2", NADiff, Tokyo, Japan
- "Chiho Aoshima, Aya Takano, Mr., Takashi Murakami", Galerie Emmanuel Perrotin, Paris, France

2001

- "Superflat", Museum of Contemporary Art, Los Angeles, California; Walker Art Center, Minneapolis, Minnesota; Henry Art Gallery, Seattle, United States
- Hiropon Show, White Cube Gallery, London, United Kingdom; Shinsaibashi Parco, Osaka, Japan
- Yokai Festival, Museum of Contemporary Art, Tokyo, Japan

2000

- "Superflat", Parco Gallery, Tokyo (curated by Takashi Murakami), Japan

1999

- "Tokyo Girls Bravo", NADiff, Tokyo; Parco Gallery, Nagoya, Japan
- "Hiropon Show", Parco Gallery, Nagoya, Japan
- "Hiropon 32/80", NADiff, Tokyo, Japan

1998

- "Ero Pop Christmas", NADiff, Tokyo, Japan
- "Hiropon Show", George's, Los Angeles, United States

1997

- Hiropon Show, shop33, Tokyo; Iwataya Z-side, Fukuoka, Japan
- Hiropon Show, Manken Gallery, Kanazawa, Japan

== Literature ==
- 2005, Little Boy: The Arts of Japan's Exploding Subculture Edited by Takashi Murakami ISBN 9780300102857
- 2005, Drop Dead Cute By Joan Vartanian ISBN 9780811847087
- 2010, Aya Takano By Jennifer Higgie ISBN 9782953279719
