= Ted Chiang =

American science fiction writer (born 1967)

- 姜峯楠
- Chiang at World Fantasy Convention 2026
- Born: 1967 (age 58–59); Port Jefferson, New York, U.S.
- Education: Brown University (BS)
- Occupations: Fiction writer; technical writer
- Writing career
- Period: 1990–present
- Genres: Science fiction, fantasy
- Notable works: ‟Tower of Babylon” (1990) ‟Story of Your Life” (1998) ‟Hell is the Absence of God” (2001); Stories of Your Life and Others (2002) ‟The Merchant and the Alchemist's Gate” (2007); Exhalation: Stories (2019)
- Notable awards: See list

Chinese name
- Traditional Chinese: 姜峯楠
- Simplified Chinese: 姜峰楠
Transcriptions
Standard Mandarin
- Hanyu Pinyin: Jiāng Fēngnán
- Bopomofo: ㄐㄧㄤㄈㄥㄋㄢˊ
- Wade–Giles: Chiang^{1} Feng^{1}-nan^{2}
- IPA: [tɕjáŋ fə́ŋnǎn]

Ted Chiang (Chinese: 姜峯楠; pinyin: Jiāng Fēngnán; born 1967) is an American science fiction writer, whose work has won four Nebula awards, four Hugo awards, the John W. Campbell Award for Best New Writer, and six Locus awards. He has published the short story collections Stories of Your Life and Others (2002) and Exhalation: Stories (2019). His short story "Story of Your Life" was the basis of the film Arrival (2016). He was an artist in residence at the University of Notre Dame from 2020 to 2021. Chiang is also a frequent non-fiction contributor to the New Yorker, where he writes on topics related to computing such as artificial intelligence.

== Early life and education ==
Chiang was born in 1967 to a Taiwanese American family in Port Jefferson, New York. His Chinese name is Chiang Feng-nan (Chinese: 姜峯楠; pinyin: Jiāng Fēngnán). Both of his parents are Taiwanese waishengren who were born in mainland China, migrated to Taiwan with their families during the Great Retreat, then immigrated to the United States. His father, Fu-pen Chiang, is a distinguished professor of mechanical engineering at Stony Brook University. His mother (d. 2019) was a librarian. Chiang also has a sister who is a physician.

Chiang grew up on Long Island and, at age 15, began submitting science fiction stories to magazines. He later recalled, "When I was a kid, my intention was to become a physicist. That was a perfectly respectable career choice for the son of an engineer. I figured I would be a fiction writer on the side, and that, I think, is perfectly acceptable to Asian parents". In 1989, he graduated from Brown University with a Bachelor of Science after choosing to study computer science over physics. As an undergraduate, Chiang continued to write sci-fi stories, though they were ultimately unpublished.

== Career ==
After attending and graduating from the Clarion Workshop in 1989 Chiang sold his first story, "The Tower of Babylon", to Omni magazine, and was awarded a Nebula Award for it in 1990. His later stories have won numerous other awards, making him one of the most-honored writers in contemporary science fiction. Chiang's first short story collection, Stories of Your Life and Others (2002) was published in 2002 by Tor Books and comprises his first eight stories. The collection was reprinted in 2016 as Arrival to coincide with the adaptation of "Story of Your Life" as the film Arrival.

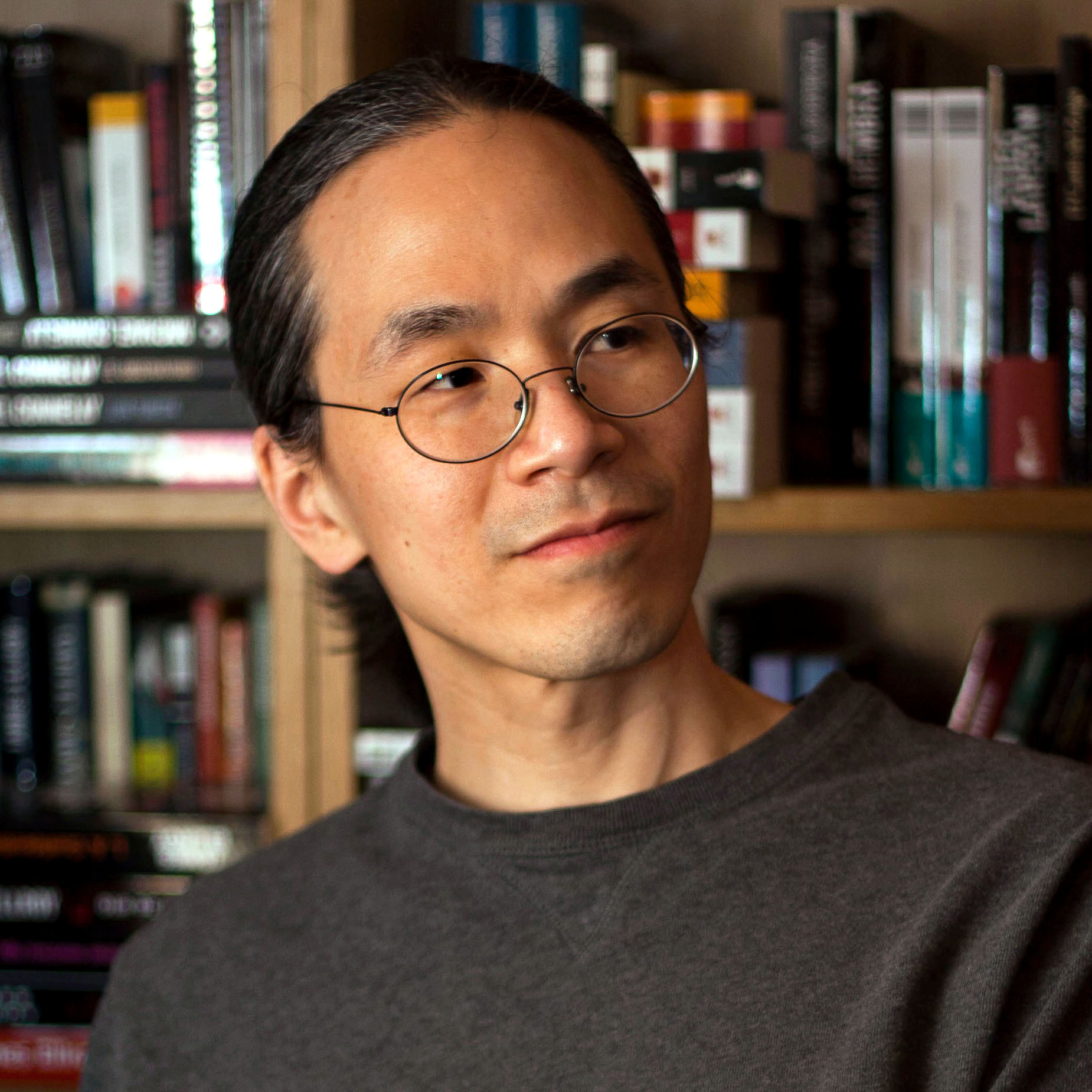
Chiang in 2011

As of July 2002, Chiang was working as a technical writer in the software industry and resided in Bellevue, Washington, near Seattle. He was an instructor at the Clarion Workshop at UC San Diego in 2012 and 2016.

Chiang's second short story collection, Exhalation: Stories was published in May 2019 by Alfred A. Knopf. Chiang has published eighteen short stories, novelettes, and novellas as of 2019. In 2022, Chiang became a Miller Scholar in the Santa Fe Institute.

In 2023, Chiang was named one of Time's 100 most influential people in AI.

== Writing style and influences ==
Isaac Asimov and Arthur C. Clarke inspired Chiang when he first started writing, and the works of Gene Wolfe, John Crowley and Edward Bryant were his creative influences in college.

Chiang has said that one of the reasons science fiction writing interests him is that it allows him to make philosophical questions "storyable". He enjoys reading explanatory story notes by authors, and includes them in his own collections. He considers these not the "precise response to 'How did you get the idea?,' but it's a way to answer the reader if they knew what the best question to ask [about the story] was".

== Reception ==
Critic John Clute has written that Chiang's work has a "tight-hewn and lucid style... [which] has a magnetic effect on the reader". Critic and poet Joyce Carol Oates wrote that Chiang explores "conventional tropes of science fiction in highly unconventional ways" in "teasing, tormenting, illuminating, thrilling" fashion, comparing him favorably to Philip K. Dick, James Tiptree Jr. and Jorge Luis Borges. Writer Peter Watts has praised Chiang's work, writing: "We share a secret prayer, we writers of short SF. We utter it whenever one of our stories is about to appear in public, and it goes like this: Please, Lord. Please, if it be Thy will, don’t let Ted Chiang publish a story this year."

Former US president Barack Obama included Chiang's short story collection Exhalation in his 2019 reading list, praising it as the "best kind of science fiction".

=== Awards ===
Ted Chiang has won or been nominated for several awards for several of his works.

Chiang turned down a Hugo nomination for his short story "Liking What You See: A Documentary" in 2003, on the grounds that the story was rushed due to editorial pressure and did not turn out as he had really wanted.

Chiang was inducted into the Science Fiction and Fantasy Hall of Fame in 2020. In 2024, Chiang won the PEN/Malamud Award for "excellence in the art of the short story" and the American Humanist Association's Inquiry and Innovation Award.

Work	Year & Award	Category	Result	Ref.
"Tower of Babylon"	1991 Locus Award	Novelette	Nominated	
"Tower of Babylon"	1991 Hugo Award	Novelette	Nominated	
"Tower of Babylon"	1990 Nebula Award	Novelette	Won	
"Tower of Babylon"	1991 SF Chronicle Award	Novelette	Nominated	
"Tower of Babylon"	1992 Astounding Award for Best New Writer		Won	
"Tower of Babylon"	1998 Premio Ignotus	Foreign Story	Nominated	
"Division by Zero"	1992 Locus Award	Short Story	Nominated	
"Understand"	1991 Asimov's Readers' Poll	Novelette	Won	
"Understand"	1992 Locus Award	Novelette	Nominated	
"Understand"	1992 Hugo Award	Novelette	Nominated	
"Understand"	1994 Hayakawa's S-F Magazine Reader's Award	Foreign Short Story	Won	
Story of Your Life	1998 Otherwise Award		Honor	
Story of Your Life	1998 HOMer Award	Novella	Nominated	
Story of Your Life	1999 Locus Award	Novella	Nominated	
Story of Your Life	1999 Hugo Award	Novella	Nominated	
Story of Your Life	1999 Theodore Sturgeon Award	Short Science Fiction	Won	
Story of Your Life	1999 Nebula Award	Novella	Won	
Story of Your Life	2001 Hayakawa's S-F Magazine Reader's Award	Foreign Short Story	Won	
Story of Your Life	2002 Seiun Award	Translated Short Story	Won	
Seventy-Two Letters	2000 Sidewise Award for Alternate History	Short Form	Won	
Seventy-Two Letters	2001 Theodore Sturgeon Award	Short Science Fiction	Finalist	
Seventy-Two Letters	2001 World Fantasy Award	Novella	Nominated	
Seventy-Two Letters	2001 Hugo Award	Novella	Nominated	
Seventy-Two Letters	2001 Locus Award	Novella	Nominated	
Seventy-Two Letters	2002 Hayakawa's S-F Magazine Reader's Award	Foreign Short Story	Won	
"Catching Crumbs from the Table (aka: The Evolution of Human Science)"	2001 Locus Award	Short Story	Nominated	
"Hell Is the Absence of God"	2002 Hugo Award	Novelette	Won	
"Hell Is the Absence of God"	2002 Locus Award	Novelette	Won	
"Hell Is the Absence of God"	2002 Theodore Sturgeon Award	Short Science Fiction	Finalist	
"Hell Is the Absence of God"	2002 Nebula Award	Novelette	Won	
"Hell Is the Absence of God"	2004 Seiun Award	Translated Short Story	Won	
"Hell Is the Absence of God"	2005 Premio Ignotus	Foreign Story	Nominated	
"Hell Is the Absence of God"	2013 Kurd Laßwitz Award	Foreign Work (Translated as Die Hölle ist die Abwesenheit Gottes)	Won	
"Liking What You See: A Documentary"	2002 Otherwise Award		Honor	
"Liking What You See: A Documentary"	2003 Theodore Sturgeon Award	Short Science Fiction	Finalist	
"Liking What You See: A Documentary"	2003 Locus Award	Novelette	Nominated	
"The Merchant and the Alchemist's Gate"	2007 BSFA Award	Short Fiction	Nominated	
"The Merchant and the Alchemist's Gate"	2008 Hugo Award	Novelette	Won	
"The Merchant and the Alchemist's Gate"	2007 Nebula Award	Novelette	Won	
"The Merchant and the Alchemist's Gate"	2008 Theodore Sturgeon Award	Short Science Fiction	Finalist	
"The Merchant and the Alchemist's Gate"	2008 Locus Award	Novelette	Nominated	
"The Merchant and the Alchemist's Gate"	2009 Seiun Award	Translated Short Story	Won	
Stories of Your Life and Others	2003 Locus Award	Collection	Won	
Stories of Your Life and Others	2007 Grand Prix de l'Imaginaire	Foreign Short story/Collection of Foreign Short Stories	Nominated	
Stories of Your Life and Others	2017 Washington State Book Award	Fiction	Nominated	
"Exhalation"	2008 BSFA Award	Short Fiction	Won	
"Exhalation"	2009 Hugo Award	Short Story	Won	
"Exhalation"	2009 Locus Award	Short Story	Won	
"Exhalation"	2010 Grand Prix de l'Imaginaire	Foreign Short story/Collection of Foreign Short Stories	Won	
"Exhalation"	2011 Seiun Award	Translated Short Story	Nominated	
"Exhalation"	2021 Ignotus Awards	Foreign Short Story	Won	
Exhalation: Stories (Collection)	2019 Bram Stoker Award	Fiction Collection	Nominated	
Exhalation: Stories (Collection)	2019 Goodreads Choice Awards	Science Fiction	Nominated	
Exhalation: Stories (Collection)	2019 Los Angeles Times Book Prize	Ray Bradbury Prize	Finalist	
Exhalation: Stories (Collection)	2020 Locus Award	Collection	Won	
Exhalation: Stories (Collection)	2021 Shelley Award	The Mary Shelley Award for Outstanding Fictional Work	Won	
Exhalation: Stories (Collection)	2021 Grand prix de l'Imaginaire	Foreign Short story/Collection of Foreign Short Stories	Nominated	
The Lifecycle of Software Objects	2011 RUSA CODES Reading List	Science Fiction	Shortlisted	
The Lifecycle of Software Objects	2011 Hugo Award	Novella	Won	
The Lifecycle of Software Objects	2010 Nebula Award	Novella	Nominated	
The Lifecycle of Software Objects	2011 Locus Award	Novella	Won	
The Lifecycle of Software Objects	2012 Seiun Award	Translated Short Story	Won	
The Lifecycle of Software Objects	2013 Premio Ignotus	Foreign Story	Nominated	
The Lifecycle of Software Objects	2014 FantLab's Book of the Year Award	Translated Novella/Short Story	Nominated	
"The Truth of Fact, the Truth of Feeling"	2014 Locus Award	Novelette	Nominated	
"The Truth of Fact, the Truth of Feeling"	2014 Hugo Award	Novelette	Nominated	
"The Truth of Fact, the Truth of Feeling"	2016 Premio Ignotus	Foreign Story	Nominated	
Arrival	2017 Hugo Award	Dramatic Presentation - Long Form	Won	
"Omphalos"	2020 Hugo Award	Novelette	Nominated	
"Omphalos"	2020 Theodore Sturgeon Award	Short Science Fiction	Finalist	
"Omphalos"	2020 Seiun Award	Translated Short Story	Nominated	
"Omphalos"	2020: Ignyte Award	Novelette	Finalist	
"Omphalos"	2020 Locus Award	Novelette	Won	
Anxiety Is the Dizziness of Freedom	2020 Hugo Award	Novella	Nominated	
Anxiety Is the Dizziness of Freedom	2019 Nebula Award	Novella	Nominated	
Anxiety Is the Dizziness of Freedom	2020 Seiun Award	Translated Short Story	Nominated	
Anxiety Is the Dizziness of Freedom	2020 Locus Award	Novella	Nominated	
"It's 2059, and the Rich Kids are Still Winning"	2020 Locus Award	Short Story	Nominated	
"Why A.I. Isn’t Going to Make Art"	2024 BSFA	Short Non-Fiction	Won	

== Personal life ==
As of 2016, Chiang lives in Bellevue, Washington, with his long-time partner, Marcia Glover, whom he met while they both were working at Microsoft. She worked as an interface designer and then a photographer.

== Works ==
=== Short stories ===
- "Tower of Babylon", Omni, 1990
- "Division by Zero", Full Spectrum 3, 1991
- "Understand", Asimov's Science Fiction, 1991
- "Story of Your Life", Starlight 2, 1998
- "The Evolution of Human Science" (also known as "Catching Crumbs from the Table"), Nature, 2000
- "Seventy-Two Letters", Vanishing Acts, 2000
- "Hell Is the Absence of God", Starlight 3, 2001
- "Liking What You See: A Documentary", Stories of Your Life and Others, 2002
- "What's Expected of Us", Nature, 2005
- "The Merchant and the Alchemist's Gate", Subterranean Press, 2007 and F&SF, September 2007
- "Exhalation", Eclipse 2, 2008
- "The Lifecycle of Software Objects", Subterranean Press, July 2010
- "Dacey's Patent Automatic Nanny", The Thackery T. Lambshead Cabinet of Curiosities (edited by Jeff VanderMeer and Ann VanderMeer) June 2011
- "The Truth of Fact, the Truth of Feeling", Subterranean Press Magazine, August 2013
- "The Great Silence", e-flux Journal, May 2015 (included in The Best American Short Stories, 2016)
- "Omphalos", Exhalation: Stories, 2019
- "Anxiety Is the Dizziness of Freedom", Exhalation: Stories, 2019
- "It's 2059, and the Rich Kids are Still Winning", New York Times, 2019

=== Collections ===
- Stories of Your Life and Others (Tor, 2002; republished as Arrival by Picador, 2016)
- Exhalation: Stories (Knopf, May 2019)

=== Non-fiction ===
- "Frankenstein's Daughter" by Maureen McHugh: An Appreciation, The Ellen Datlow/SCI FICTION Project, December 30, 2005
- The Problem of the Traveling Salesman, Lady Churchill's Rosebud Wristlet #23, November 2008
- Reasoning About the Body, Lady Churchill's Rosebud Wristlet #26, November 2010
- Introduction to "Particle Theory", Strange Horizons, October 31, 2011
- Bad Character, The New Yorker, May 9, 2016
- Silicon Valley Is Turning Into Its Own Worst Fear, BuzzFeed, December 18, 2017
- What If Parents Loved Strangers’ Children As Much As Their Own?, The New Yorker, December 31, 2017
- Why Computers Won’t Make Themselves Smarter, The New Yorker, March 30, 2021
- Foreword to The Art and Science of Arrival by Tanya Lapointe, 2022
- Foreword to The History of Science Fiction: A Graphic Novel Adventure by Xavier Dollo, 2022
- ChatGPT Is a Blurry JPEG of the Web, The New Yorker, February 9, 2023
- Will A.I. Become the New McKinsey?, The New Yorker, May 4, 2023
- Why A.I. Isn't Going to Make Art, The New Yorker, August 31, 2024
- No, Artificial Intelligence Is Not Conscious, The Atlantic, June 3, 2026

=== Lectures ===
- Ted Chiang on the Future, MoMA PS1, July 8, 2013
- Imaginary Science and Magic in Fiction, Notre Dame Technology Ethics Center, November 2020

=== Philosophy ===
- Friedell, David, ed. (2025). The Philosophy of Ted Chiang. doi:10.1007/978-3-031-81662-8. ISBN 978-3-031-81661-1.
  - "Book review: The Philosophy of Ted Chiang | Santa Fe Institute". June 23, 2025.

=== Film ===
The screenwriter Eric Heisserer adapted Chiang's story "Story of Your Life" into the 2016 film Arrival. Directed by Denis Villeneuve, the film stars Amy Adams and Jeremy Renner.
