= Story of Your Life =

1998 science fiction novella by Ted Chiang

- Short story by Ted Chiang
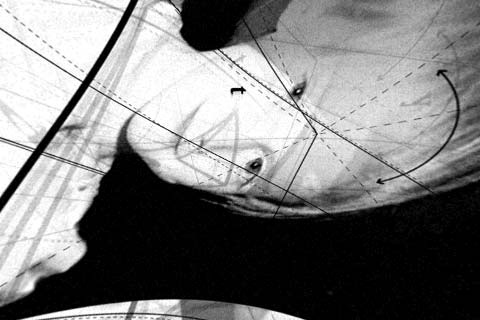
- Illustration for "Story of Your Life" by Hidenori Watanabe for S-F Magazine
- Country: United States
- Language: English
- Genre: Science fiction

Publication
- Published in: Starlight 2
- Publication type: Anthology
- Publisher: Tor Books
- Publication date: November 1998

"Story of Your Life" is a science fiction novella by American writer Ted Chiang, first published in Starlight 2 in 1998, and later in 2002 in Chiang's collection of short stories, Stories of Your Life and Others. Some of the story's major themes include linguistic determinism.

"Story of Your Life" won the 1999 Nebula Award for Best Novella, as well as the 1999 Theodore Sturgeon Award. It was nominated for the 1999 Hugo Award for Best Novella. The novella has been translated into French, German, Italian and Japanese.

A film adaptation of the story, Arrival, was conceived and adapted by Eric Heisserer, and released in 2016. It was nominated for eight Academy Awards, including Best Adapted Screenplay. (Note: Arrival was also nominated for Best Picture, Best Director, Best Cinematography, Best Film Editing, Best Production Design, Best Sound Mixing and Best Adapted Screenplay, and won the award for Best Sound Editing. (See 89th Academy Awards.)) The film also won the 2017 Ray Bradbury Award for Outstanding Dramatic Presentation and the Hugo Award for Best Dramatic Presentation.

== Plot ==
"Story of Your Life" is narrated by linguist Dr. Louise Banks the day her daughter is conceived. Addressed to her daughter, the story alternates between recounting the past: the coming of aliens to Earth and the deciphering of their language; and remembering the future: what will happen to her daughter as she grows up, and her daughter's untimely death.

Aliens arrive in spaceships and enter Earth's orbit; 112 devices resembling large semi-circular mirrors appear at sites across the globe. Dubbed "looking glasses", they are audiovisual links to the aliens in orbit, who are called heptapods for their seven-limbed radially symmetrical appearance. Louise and physicist Dr. Gary Donnelly are recruited by the U.S. Army to communicate with the aliens, and are assigned to one of nine looking glass sites in the U.S. They make contact with two heptapods they nickname Flapper and Raspberry. In an attempt to learn their language, Louise begins by associating objects and gestures with sounds the aliens make, which reveals a language with free word order and many levels of center-embedded clauses. She finds their writing to be chains of semagrams on a two-dimensional surface in no linear sequence, and semasiographic, having no reference to speech. Louise concludes that, because their speech and writing are unrelated, the heptapods have two languages, which she calls Heptapod A (speech) and Heptapod B (writing).

Attempts are also made to establish heptapod terminology in physics. Little progress is made, until a presentation of Fermat's Principle of Least Time is given. Gary explains the principle to Louise, giving the example of the refraction of light, and that light will always take the fastest possible route. Louise reasons, "[a] ray of light has to know where it will ultimately end up before it can choose the direction to begin moving in." She knows the heptapods do not write a sentence one semagram at a time, but draw all the ideograms simultaneously, suggesting they know what the entire sentence will be beforehand. Louise realizes that instead of experiencing events sequentially (causality), heptapods experience all events at once (teleology). This is reflected in their language, and explains why Fermat's Principle of Least Time comes naturally to them.

Soon, Louise becomes proficient at Heptapod B, and finds that when writing in it, trains of thought are directionless, and premises and conclusions interchangeable. She finds herself starting to think in Heptapod B and begins to see time in a non-linear fashion, much like the heptapodians. She glimpses into her future, describing a daughter she does not yet have. This raises questions about the nature of free will: knowledge of the future would imply no free will, because knowing the future means it cannot be changed. But Louise asks herself, "What if the experience of knowing the future changed a person? What if it evoked a sense of urgency, a sense of obligation to act precisely as she knew she would?"

One day, after a seemingly routine information exchange, the heptapods announce they must leave Earth permanently. They shut down the looking glasses and their ships disappear, never establishing the reason behind their leave or arrival.

== Background ==
In the "Story Notes" section of Stories of Your Life and Others, Chiang writes that inspiration for "Story of Your Life" came from his fascination in the variational principle in physics. In the early 1990s, after seeing American actor Paul Linke's performance in his one-man play Time Flies When You’re Alive about his wife's struggles with breast cancer, Chiang realized he could use this principle to show how someone deals with the inevitable.

A few years later, a friend’s remark about her recognizing her newborn baby from his movements in the womb inspired Chiang on how to incorporate this principle into a story. Chiang then spent five years researching and familiarizing himself with the field of linguistics before attempting to write "Story of Your Life".

In 2017, Chiang mentions in an interview that he was also inspired by certain physical principles he had learned about in high school having to do with the nature of time, from which the idea for a story emerged about accepting the arrival of the inevitable, as well as its focus on a linguist who might learn such acceptance by deciphering the language of an alien race with a different conception of time.

Inspired by an entry on "Conceptual Breakthrough" in the first edition Clute and Nicholls’ Encyclopedia of Science Fiction that he purchased in high school, Chiang often includes conceptual breakthroughs—moments when a character’s understanding of their universe changes fundamentally, triggering a paradigm shift about how they see their place in the world around them—in his stories as a way of recreating and dramatizing the process of scientific discovery without being constrained by history.

== Themes ==
=== Free will and determinism ===
Regarding the central theme of the story, Chiang said that Kurt Vonnegut summed it up in his introduction in the 25th anniversary edition of his novel Slaughterhouse-Five:

Stephen Hawking ... found it tantalizing that we could not remember the future. But remembering the future is child's play for me now. I know what will become of my helpless, trusting babies because they are grown-ups now. I know how my closest friends will end up because so many of them are retired or dead now ... To Stephen Hawking and all others younger than myself I say: "Be patient. Your future will come to you and lie down at your feet like a dog who knows and likes you no matter what you are."

In a 2010 interview, Chiang said that "Story of Your Life" addresses the subject of free will. The philosophical debates about whether or not we have free will tend toward the abstract, but Chiang suggests that knowing the future makes the question very real. Chiang added, "If you know what's going to happen, can you keep it from happening? Even when a story says that you can't, the emotional impact arises from the feeling that you should be able to."

Chiang himself has taken a compatibilist stance on this debate, saying that he believes the universe “is deterministic, but that the most meaningful definition of free will is compatible with determinism” in a later interview.

=== Linguistic relativity ===
At the Clarion Workshop he attended in 1989, Chiang mentions discussing the Sapir-Whorf hypothesis with another writer, who remarked that Chiang was “the first person I’ve met who’s heard of that before”. This early interest in linguistic relativity theory later features prominently in “Story of Your Life”, most notably in how learning Heptapod languages transforms Louise's perception of linear time to a more heptapod-like simultaneous perception of the past and future.

== Reception ==
In The New York Review of Books American author James Gleick said that "Story of Your Life" poses the questions: would knowing your future be a gift or a curse, and is free will simply an illusion? Gleick wrote "For us ordinary mortals, the day-to-day experience of a preordained future is almost unimaginable", but Chiang does just that in this story, he "imagine[s] it". In a review of Chiang's Stories of Your Life and Others in The Guardian, English fantasy author China Miéville described "Story of Your Life" as "tender" with an "astonishingly moving culmination", which he said is "surprising" considering it is achieved using science.

Writing in Kirkus Reviews Ana Grilo called it a "thought-provoking, beautiful story". He said that in contrast to the familiar fare of lavish stories involving aliens, "Story of Your Life" is "a breath of fresh air" whose objective "is to not only to learn how to communicate but how to communicate effectively." In a review in Entertainment Monthly Samantha Schraub said that the story's two narratives, Louise recalling the unraveling of the heptapods' language, and telling her yet-to-be-born daughter what will happen to her, creates "an ambiguity and air of mystery, which make the reader question everything that unfolds". Schraub called it "an award-worthy science fiction novella that will resonate with readers, and leave them thinking how they would live—or even change—their present, if they knew their future."

Academic commentary has similarly emphasized the story's thematic focus on linguistic relativity, temporal perception, posthumanism, and determinism. Scholars have noted that Chiang’s work reflects a broader trend in late 20th-century science fiction toward integrating scientific concepts with philosophical inquiry, describing "Story of Your Life" as examining the relationship between human society and the sciences and the posthumanist transformation of human identity through contact with nonhuman intelligence using speculative premises.

Some scholars argue that that the centrality of linguistic decoding reflects wider debates about cross-cultural understanding and the role of interpretation in constructing meaning. In their 2018 article, Glazier and Beck extend these interpretations by arguing that language in the narrative functions not only as a medium of communication but also as a constitutive force in the production of meaning and subjectivity.

== Awards ==
Award	Year	Result
Nebula Award for Best Novella	1999	Won
Theodore Sturgeon Award	1999	Won
Hugo Award for Best Novella	1999	Nominated
Locus Award for Best Novella	1999	Ranked 10th
James Tiptree Jr. Award	1998	Shortlisted

== Publication history ==
Date	Title	Author/Editor	Language	Type
November 1998	Starlight 2	Patrick Nielsen Hayden	English	Anthology
June 1999	The Year's Best Science Fiction: Sixteenth Annual Collection	Gardner Dozois	English	Anthology
June 1999	Year's Best SF 4	David G. Hartwell	English	Anthology
August 1999	The Mammoth Book of the Best New Science Fiction 12	Gardner Dozois	English	Anthology
September 1999	Strani universi 2	Piergiorgio Nicolazzini	Italian	Anthology
May 2000	Al suono di una musica aliena	David G. Hartwell	Italian	Anthology
April 2001	Nebula Awards Showcase 2001	Robert Silverberg	English	Anthology
July 2002	Stories of Your Life and Others	Ted Chiang	English	Collection
February 2005	The Best of the Best: 20 Years of the Year's Best Science Fiction	Gardner Dozois	English	Anthology
November 2007	A Science Fiction Omnibus	Brian Aldiss	English	Anthology
March 2008	The Mammoth Book of the Best of the Best New SF	Gardner Dozois	English	Anthology
November 2009	Il meglio della SF / II. L'Olimpo dei classici moderni	Gardner Dozois	Italian	Anthology
December 2012	Lightspeed	John Joseph Adams	English	Magazine
July 2016	The Big Book of Science Fiction: The Ultimate Collection	Ann VanderMeer, Jeff VanderMeer	English	Anthology

- Source: Internet Speculative Fiction Database

== Works cited ==
- Chiang, Ted (2015a) [2002]. "Story of Your Life". Stories of Your Life and Others (e-book ed.). Picador. p. 76. ISBN 978-1-4472-8198-6.
- Chiang, Ted (2015b) [2002]. "Story Notes". Stories of Your Life and Others (e-book ed.). Picador. p. 223. ISBN 978-1-4472-8198-6.
