= Santa Maria del Soccorso =

Santa Maria del Soccorso may refer to:

== Churches ==
- Santa Maria del Soccorso, Alcamo, in Trapani. Sicily, Italy
- Santa Maria del Soccorso, Livorno, in Tuscany, Italy
- Santa Maria del Soccorso, Petriolo, in Macerata, Italy
- Santa Maria del Soccorso, Villa Jovis, on Capri, Italy
- Santa Maria del Soccorso all'Arenella, in Naples, Italy
- Santa Maria del Soccorso a Capodimonte, in Naples, Italy
- Santa Maria del Soccorso, a convent in Specchiolla, Brindisi, Italy

== Stations ==
- Santa Maria del Soccorso (Rome Metro), a surface station on Line B
