= San Vito dei Normanni =

- Comune
- Comune di San Vito dei Normanni
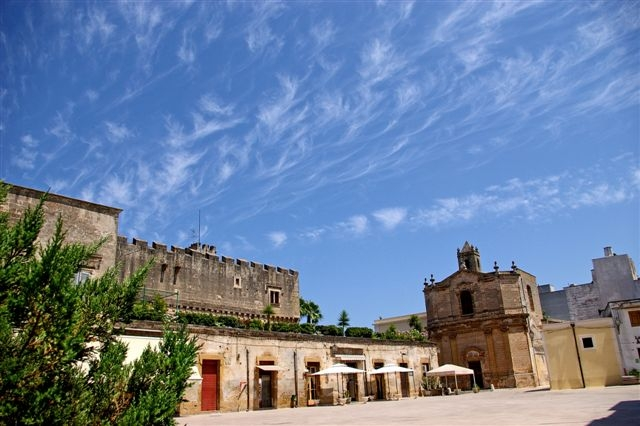
- Nickname: Santu Vitu
- Motto: Noli Me Tangere
- Location within Italy Location within Apulia
- Coordinates: 40°39′29″N 17°42′28″E
- Country: Italy
- Region: Apulia
- Province: Province of Brindisi
- Founded: 1050 - 1111 AD
- Frazioni: Conforto, Favorita, San Giacomo, San Vito Scalo

Government
  - Mayor: Domenico Conte

Area
  - Total: 66 km^{2} (25 sq mi)
- Elevation: 108 m (354 ft)

Population (2025)
  - Total: 17,842
  - Density: 270/km^{2} (700/sq mi)
- Time zone: UTC+1 (CET)
  - Summer (DST): UTC+2 (CEST)
- Postal code: 72019
- Dialing code: 0831
- Patron saint: St Vitus of Lucania and St Vincent Ferrer
- Saint day: 15 June

San Vito dei Normanni (Sanvitese: Santu Vitu), historically known as San Vito degli Schiavoni is an Italian town of 17,842 inhabitants of the province of Brindisi in Apulia. The inhabitants are called Sanvitesi (or Santuvitisi in dialect) and the town is sometimes referred to as San Vito.

== Physical geography ==
The town is located in the northeast of the Salento plains, not far from the Itria Valley. The geomorphology of the land is flat, slightly undulating on the border with the municipalities of Carovigno and Ostuni. It is located 9 kilometres (6 miles) from the Adriatic coast, the port nearest beach Specchiolla, a historic marine residence of San Vito. San Vito also is 5 km (3 mi) from the Torre Guaceto, located in Serranova, a nature reserve, accessible by foot or bicycle (Pennagrossa Point), and 12 km (7 mi) from the tower which gives its name to the protected area. The Ionian Sea is about 45 km (28 mi) away. Its altitude is around 100 metres (328 feet) above sea level precisely between 57–146 m (187–479 ft). The highest point of the city center is located in Contrada Castello d'Alceste, 1,190 m (3,904 ft).

=== Territory ===
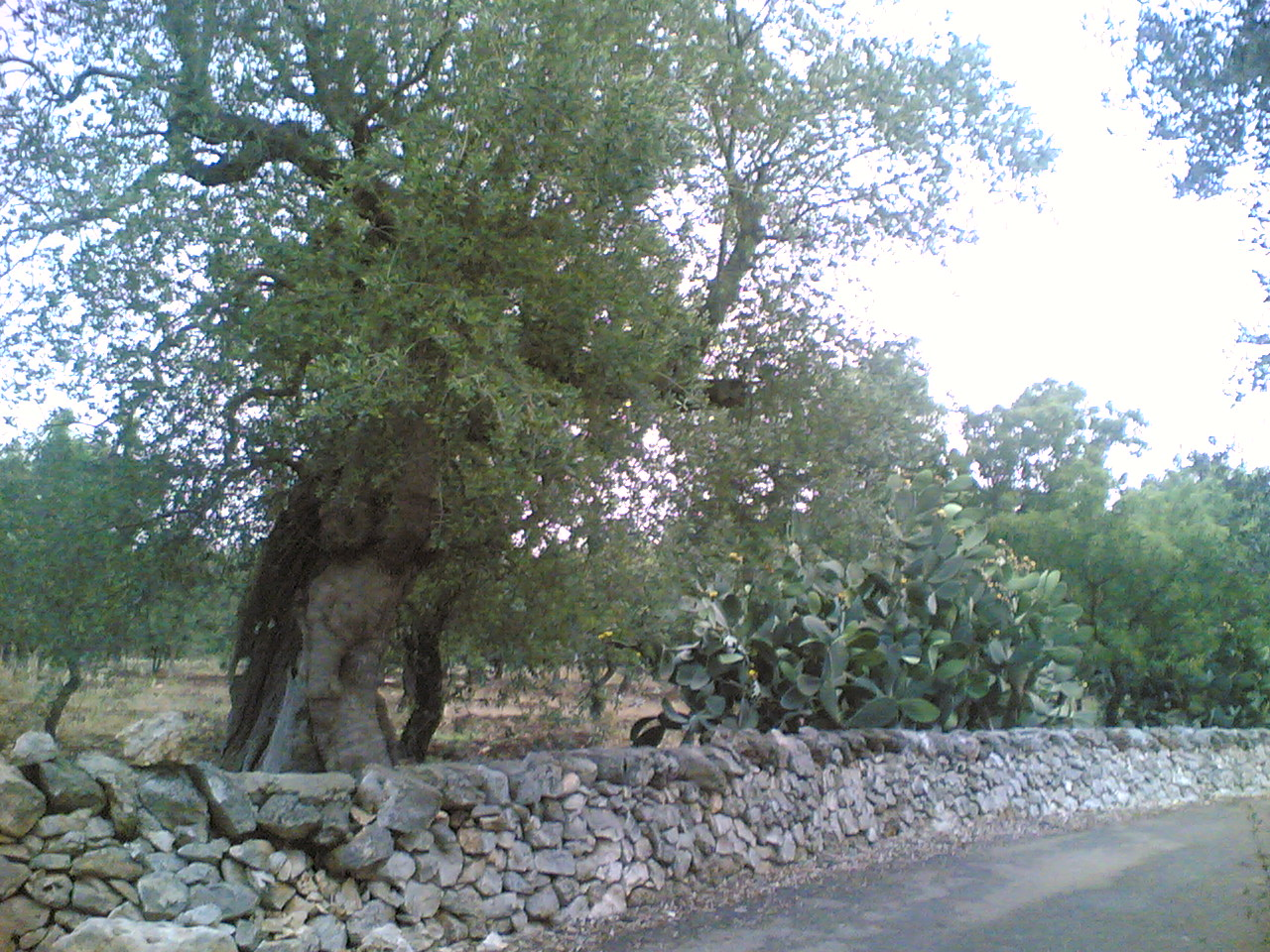
San Vito dei Normanni, Contrada Ammazzaciucci

The nature of the San Vito soil is limestone. The landscape is characterized by cultivated fields with oak and olive trees and divided by stone walls used to separate farms. The distances from major cities of Puglia are:

- 21.6 km (13 mi) from Brindisi
- 59.1 km (37 mi) from Lecce
- 61.1 km (38 mi) from Taranto
- 101.6 km (63 mi) from Bari
- 152.7 kn from Trani
- 160.8 km (100 mi) from Andria
- 165.8 km (103 mi) from Barletta
- 235.3 km (146 mi) from Foggia

=== Climate ===
Based on averages of thirty years reference (1961–1990), the average temperature of the most cold month January, stands around 9.5 °C (49.1 °F), while that of hot month, August, is around 25 °C (77 °F). Precipitation averages, less than 600 mm (23.6 in) per year. Climate classification of San Vito:

- Climate zone C;

== Etymology ==
The name of the city once included the words "degli Schiavoni", meaning "of the Slavs". To escape the persecutions of the Saracens, they migrated from Dalmatia to the opposite coast of the Adriatic, settling in late 963 in the fertile regions of Apulia. After that the town was called simply St Vitus, or St Vitus of the Slavs, or else San Vito in Terra d'Otranto. In 1863, after being returned to the Kingdom of Italy, which had been formed in 1861, the name of San Vito degli Schiavoni was changed and it assumed its current name of "San Vito dei Normanni" in honor of the man who is considered the founder of the medieval village, Bohemond of Hauteville (1050–1111), son of Robert Guiscard.

== History ==
Archaeological remains of a tomb in the Mondescine area contain the remains of thirty burials and various ceramics dating to 1800 BC - 1700 BC, show that the area was inhabited during the Bronze Age. Also prehistoric settlements (18 - 9th century BC) have been found belonging to Messapi quarters in the Castle and Paretone area.

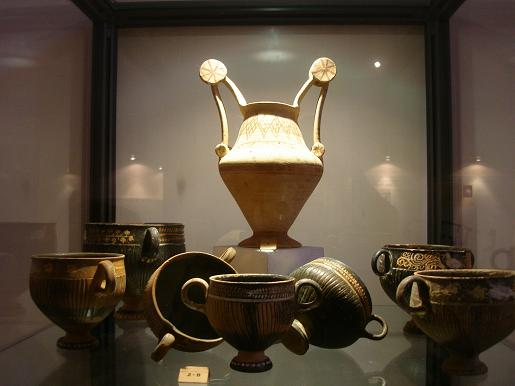
Messapica Ceramics

The village dates back to the Middle Ages (late 10th century), presumably by a colony of Slavs (emigrated from Slavonia) escaping the persecutions of the Saracens, and decided to settle in the fertile areas of San Vito founding "Castro Sancti Viti".

Some scholars believe that the city was founded by the Norman Bohemond of Hauteville ( 1050 - 1111 AD), son of Robert Guiscard, who, to satisfy his love of hunting, ordered the construction of a square tower, which still exists today.

The small village originally grew in the late Middle Ages when the Normans ensured security from the constant attacks of the Saracens. This relative calm gave the opportunity to develop Sanvitesi trade, and to dominate the surrounding territory. It was in the 15th century that the town was organized as a commune, though feudal servitude continued. The commune belonged to the Altavilla, then to the Sambiase, then Raymond Orsini of the Balzo and then the Dentice Frasso. From the 15th century onwards, the city began to widen, extending north and east. In 1484 it was sacked by the Venetians. In 1571, during the Crusades, a handful of Sanvitesi took part in the Battle of Lepanto against the Ottoman Empire. In honor of the victory won, they built the Basilica Santa Maria della Vittoria and then dedicated it to the Madonna della Vittoria. In 1799 it joined the Neapolitan Republic; the population during the 19th century the city was the seat of various participating circles to the Carbonari.

During the Fascist period it experienced remarkable urban development. There were many important buildings built such as The Circle Elementary School, the seat of the Municipality, and the post office. In 1927, the province of Brindisi was established which includes San VitoI. In 1943, it hosted King Victor Emmanuel III which was trying to escape to liberation, with Marshal Pietro Badoglio's government. In the early 1960s, the petrochemical industry in addition to engineering companies and Aeronavali of Brindisi San Vito have moved many workers from working the fields to the assembly line. The opening of the San Vito dei Normanni Air Station into a strategic focal point during the Cold War, simultaneously created the work between the locals and received thousands of American workers. It closed after the fall of the Berlin Wall. Today San Vito is marketing to develop tourism.

== Main sights ==
=== Religious architecture ===
==== Church of Santa Maria della Vittoria ====
Santa Maria della Vittoria, simply called the "Mother Church", is the most important religious building in the city. The largest church in the city shows evidence of previous wars from the fist-sized holes that can be seen in and around the exterior. Built in the shape of a Latin cross with three naves, a transept and a deep chancel. Inside valuable paintings such as the icon of Nicopeia, depicting the Virgin Mary, announcing to Pope Pius V the victory over the Turks, and a silver statue representing St. Vitus. On the right side of the basilica there is the Holy Door, opened in October 1995 during celebrations for the fourth centenary of the church, beginning at the Holy Year Jubilee of the Church. Also the occasion was marked by the presentation of a new wooden altar, together all the furnishings of the sanctuary, of Flavio Pancheri. On October 26, 1996, Pope John Paul II, during a special audience called on the Archdiocese of Brindisi-Ostuni, and solemnly crowned the icon of Our Lady Nicopeia. The pope proclaimed the church a papal Basilica on December 30, 1998.

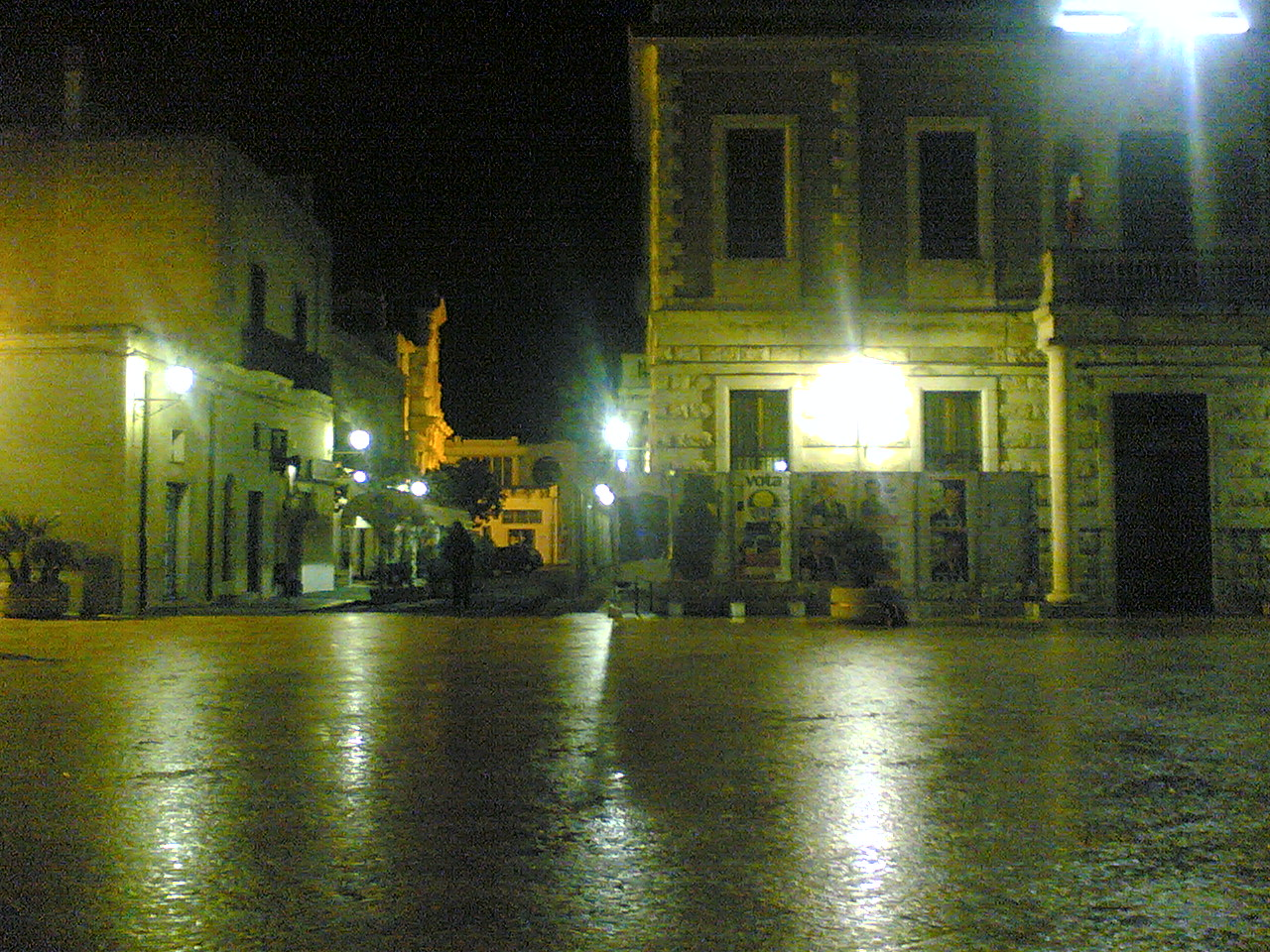
Leonardo Leo Piazza

==== Church of San Giovanni Evangelista ====
St. John the Evangelist is a church in Baroque style. The façade, with four pilasters with Corinthian capitals are in Lecce stone, which is very soft, allowing for striking decorations. In the church there are six paintings, two of which placed in a wooden structure which includes frame and canopy, the other four are on the sidewalls. The church, was "sold" by the Dentice Frasso family of the symbolic sum of 10,000 lira to the City of San Vito.

==== Chiesa Santa Maria degli Angeli ====
The "Old Church" was built around the 15th century. Subsequent modifications took place in 1696 and 1763. It has a simple façade, marked by six pilasters with an elegant portal and an oval window with projecting cornices. In its interior are side altars of stone, an altar in polychrome marble, a wood crucifix from the 16th century and an 1809 painting made by Domenico Carella.

==== Church of Santa Maria della Mercede ====
"The church of St. Francis" dates back to 1735 and was commissioned by Prince Fabio Marchese Belprato. At the end of the 19th century, with the arrival of Mercedarian Order, there was installed a significantly larger cupola, sanctuary and adjoining convent. The façade has four pilasters with Ionic capitals, two niches in which there are statues of Our Lady of Mercy and St. Francis of Paola. Inside are chandeliers in wrought iron and the statue, in wood, of St. Francis.

==== Church of Santa Maria delle Grazie ====
The "Monastery" is so named because until 1868, it was next to the convent of the Franciscan Friars Minor. It was built in 1586, at the behest of Prince Palagano Lucius II, with a single aisle. Then, with a subsequent action in 1700, it was added a second, and in 1898 a third. The façade is very simple, and has only two windows in the portal and central. In the interior, there are nine altars in the side stones and paintings depicting the Crucifixion. Moreover, in the aisles, there is the Pietà by an unknown author, the Providence and San Salvador from Orte by local artist Giacomo da San Vito.

==== Church of the Annunciation ====
Also called the Church of San Domenico, due to the presence of the nearby convent of the Dominicans until 1809. The church was built around 1584 on land donated by a devotee. It has a cusp façade with two side pilasters, window and central portal by a local sculptor. In 1984 the collapse of two aisles caused the closure for restoration work that lasted a decade. Today, reconstructed, it has reopened for worship and there restored the six side stone altars of the 18th century and a tapestry from 1769 depicting the Annunciation by artist Domenico Carella.

==== Church of San Michele Arcangelo ====
Built in 1928 by Concetta Carlucci, who in a vision was invited to awaken the worship of the saint in the city. The structure is very simple, has been enriched by a bronze portal surmounted by a lunette with a bas-relief depicting St. Michael the Archangel, by the sculptor Cosimo Giuliano Latiano and a statue depicting Concetta Carlucci.

==== Other churches ====
- Church of Santa Maria della Pietà, also called "Church of the Hospital"
- Church of Santa Rita
- Church of Santa Teresa

==== Rock settlements ====
There are many rock art sites within San Vito made by Byzantine monks that fled from eastern Europe as they were persecuted because of their faith. Such sites include:

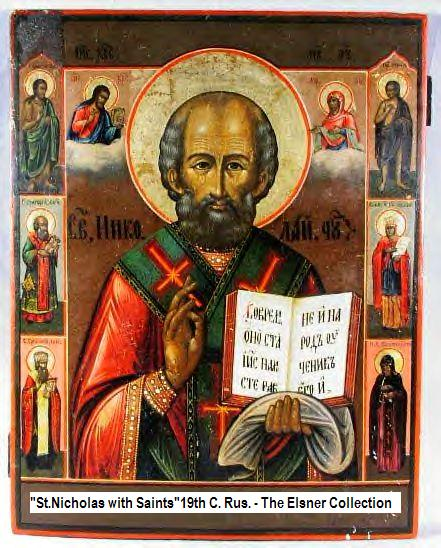
Saint Nicholas

- San Biagio, which is located near the Jannuzzo farm, is a monastic Byzantine sanctuary placed in real rock. The Eastern Orthodox rite is drawn inside a cave. It also presents the cells intended for monks, but over time has undergone significant transformations. Like all churches carved out along the last stretch of the Via Francigena, the sanctuary of San Biagio presents votive frescoes dedicated to Saint Blaise, Saint Nicholas, St. Andrew, St. George, St. James and St. John. The inscriptions on the iconography, are all in Greek except one, that of St. Nicholas, which sets in Latin as a sign of religious unity between the Eastern Orthodox Church and the Latin Church.
- St. Nicholas in the San Nicola-Malpasso is located halfway between San Vito and Serranova. The crypt and the four adjoining caves are located in a small valley, partly carved in rock, partly built in tuff. Inside is the image of St. Nicholas and traces of frescoes can be seen in the walls of tufa.
- Crypt of San Giovanni is a settlement with several rock caves, some partially collapsed, in which two small cells were found with traces of graffiti. Another, almost completely underground, is divided into seven side branches that converge into a central corridor. The crypt presents a pillar around which rests three arcs. Parts of frescoes, dating back presumably to the 13th century, are in the central apse.
- Crypt of St Mary the hamlet of St. James is situated in an old farmhouse, which was abandoned in the 15th century. Inside the church has a fresco of the Virgin with Child.

=== Civil architecture ===
==== The Rezze ====
Rezza (from Retia in Latin, meaning network), is a type of shade used to protect houses' front doors mostly from direct sunlight but also from rain and wind. Rezze are made by thin plates of wood placed horizontally and parallel to each other, with few millimeters between one another. These shades are usually either purple, green, yellow, brown or beige. A traditional expression from San Vito is "vecchia cretu la rezza", literally meaning "older woman behind the shade" but indeed referring to someone who likes to spy on others without being seen.

=== Archaeological sites ===
In the 1990s, just outside the town, specifically in Contrada Castello d'Alceste, traces of buildings dating back to Iron Age and, following excavations, a large Messapii settlement presumably dating from the period between the 7th and 4th centuries BC were found. That site could become the first Archeodromo of Italy. The archaeological site was the subject of several excavations made by the City Council of San Vito dei Normanni, the Archaeological Superintendence of Taranto and the University of Salento's Department of Cultural Heritage.

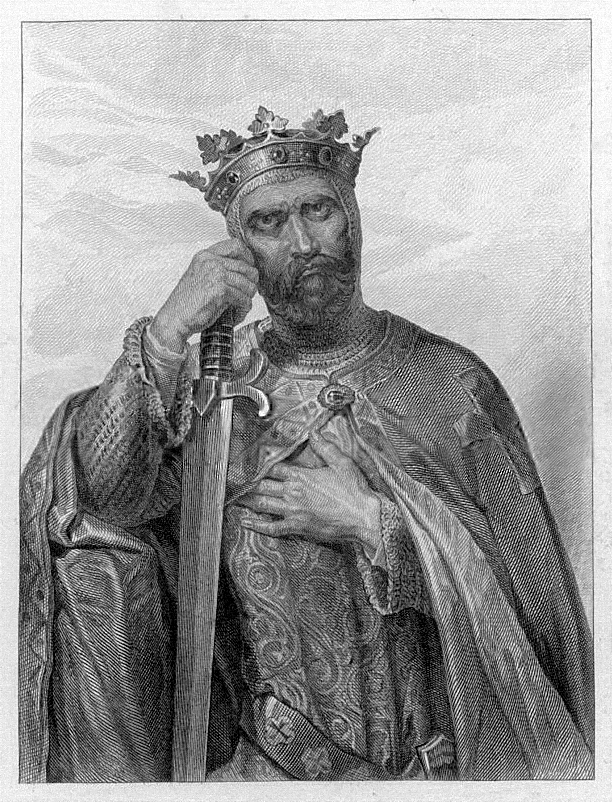
Bohemond of Hauteville

=== Military architecture ===
==== Castle of Dentice Frasso ====
The medieval castle of Dentice Frasso, opposite the Town Hall with its ancient square tower, overlooks the main town's piazza. The original access was via a drawbridge which was from the box located on the door of the Chapel The first building was undoubtedly the tower, believed to be Norman and dating from the 12th century. Built by Bohemond of Hauteville in the 11th century, in a strategic position on the road that passed through the hamlet of San Vito and came to the old road for Oria. It is perfectly intact, still dominates the area of San Vito. The tower has Guelphs and Ghibellines-like battlements and narrow openings that allows indoor lighting. There is a large courtyard that overlooks the cinquecento residence, characterized by a series of elegant rectangular boxes around the tower. The castle was probably built originally as the residence of hunters, as once the territory of San Vito completely covered by forests. The entrance to the building consists of a pointed arch, on top is placed a crest of the Dentice family. The stairway leads to a stone porch column, on which rest three round arches. Inside retains decorated suites, paintings, hunting trophies and the town archive. The castle is privately owned and inhabited by descendants of the Dentice Frasso family.

=== Natural areas ===
==== Villa Comunale ====
The only green space of the city is the Villa Comunale, called the Pinewood due to the presence of large marine pines, and also many palm trees. The park is at the center of the city and surrounds the primary school.

==== Countryside ====
A few kilometers from the city is Torre Guaceto (Guaceto Tower), a World Wildlife Fund nature reserve of the State whose extension is approximately 1,200 square feet (110 m^{2}) and a sea front which stretches for about 8,000 mt. The marine area is represented by a perfect rectangle, with an average depth of 3,000 meters, crossed and divided by State Road 379. The reserve can be visited only on foot or by bicycle.

== Society ==
=== Demographic evolution ===
The demographic balance the municipality as of March 31, 2008 has 19,915 inhabitants, is as follows: 10,365 females and 9452 males. 7274 families the average family component is 2.7 (higher than the national average of 2.5, but less to the corresponding value of the region that instead of 2.8). The town, like many towns of Apulia experienced a slight decrease in population due to the decrease in part by birth rate which is matched by the fact that many young people decide to complete their university studies in a city in central-north especially Milan, Bologna and Rome.

==== Migrations ====
San Vito was the subject of extensive emigration during the 20th century, first to the Americas, later towards northern Europe (especially Germany) and to northwestern Italy, but today the town has become a destination for immigrants from outside the European Union. A phenomenon that, at least for a decade now, seems to settle into the territory is that of immigration by families from northern Europe, especially English and Irish people. These new arrivals usually consist of pensioners, not coming to work, who buy villas in the countryside of San Vito and enjoy the pleasant temperatures all year. This phenomenon, relatively recent in Apulia, is known as "Salentoshire", a playful neologism along the lines of "Chiantishire", which refers to the consolidated British tourism in Tuscany.

=== Dialect ===
The Sanvitese is a Brindisi dialect belonging to the southern extreme Salento family. Some Sanvitese idioms include:

- Figghiu mutu la mamma lu ntendi. (The mother understands her mute child)
- Ccugghimu li fierri.. (Take up the tools of the trade - taking what belongs to us and we go on)
- Ci eti veru ca lu munnu gira, casa mea prima o ppoi avà passai ti quai (if it is true that the world turns, my house sooner or later, must pass by here)
- Ci unu nasci cu la capu tunna, no ppo murì cu la capu quatrata (literally: if a person is born with a round head, it certainly will not die with a square head, figuratively speaking, if a person is made in a certain way, they will remain so until his death)

=== The 'nciuria ===
The 'nciuria is the nickname that has a valence of mockery and is given to the inhabitants of any Salento town by the inhabitants of nearby towns. The nickname of San Vito is "mulacchiuni" that is "big mules". The reason for the 'nciuria is due to Sanvitesi attitude to differences, news and ideas. They tend to remain stubborn on their ideas, even denying the evidence. Like mules, the Sanvitese would have the blinders that are looking only forward, without further nuances or points of view.

== Culture ==
=== Education ===
==== Libraries ====
- John XXIII Biblioteca Comunale is the city's first public library, founded by Dominican friars. They possessed thousands of leather-bound books and sorted into nine large closets. Since 1809 the monks left the monastery and many works were lost. In 1946, Mayor Vincenzo Trizza appointed a committee to create a new library. They donated 750 volumes and ordered 450 books of classics, two encyclopedias, and books by fellow authors. In 1962, the present library was founded through the efforts of Professor Angelo Pagliara, who sent letters to the highest offices of State and the Catholic Church to request materials. Pope John XXIII was the first to respond and gave three volumes of his speeches with handwritten signatures and, therefore, the library took name.
- St. Benedict Public Library, founded in 1940, is located in the convent of Benedictine Oblates of St. Scholastica but is open to the public. It features about 26,000 volumes and pamphlets and specializes in Biblical, Theology, Patristics, and Ecumenism in the history of the Church.

==== Schools ====
The city has various schools: two kindergartens - "San Domenico" and "Palatucci-Don Bosco"- two primary schools - "Lanza del Vasto", "Monsignor Francesco Passante"- a lower secondary school-"Don Vincenzo Meo". These schools belong to Primo Istituto Comprensivo San Vito dei Normanni. The schools belonging to Secondo Istituto Comprensivo San Vito dei Normanni are: three kindergartens- "Andersen", "Collodi" and "Rodari"-"two primary schools "Don Lorenzo Milani", "Madre Teresa di Calcutta"; a lower secondary school- "Buonsanto; and two second level secondary schools: Liceo Scientifico Leonardo Leo and Professional Institute for Social Services "Peppino Impastato".

==== Rural Museum ====
The Rural Museum implemented by local action group Altosalento, was inaugurated on July 21, 2001 and is currently managed by the Cultural Association AXAS Onlus. The museum, like the town library, is located within the cloister of the Dominicans. The museum houses a remarkable collection of objects and tools that bear witness to everyday rural life between the 18th century and the early 1950s. The tools cover artisans, blacksmiths, carpenters, saddlers, knife grinders, shoemakers and of course farmers.

==== Castello d'Alceste Museum ====
In the Contrada Castello d'Alceste were found traces of a village huts in the second half of the 8th century BC. It overlaps the 6th century BC buildings, reflecting the surge of new construction techniques and a new way to conceive of living space. The houses of this period are divided into multiple environments and have complex roof systems that make use of tiles.

=== Media ===
- Web TV: Web TV Puntonet
- Radio: Teleradio San Vito.
- Press:
  - Il Punto (eng: The Point): monthly
  - L'Arcobaleno (eng: The Rainbow): bimonthly
  - Occhio Magazine (eng: Eye Magazine) (monthly).

=== Music ===
==== Tarantism in San Vito ====
Tarantism (a type of Tarantella) blends pagan and Christian tradition. In the past it was believed, that women who showed forms of hysteria, were infected by the bite of the tarantula. The only known remedy was to dance continuously for days, so that the poison did not take effect. Through music and dance to give healing to taranta (the tarantula bitten), creating a real exorcism of musical character. Each time a tarantata exhibiting symptoms associated with Taranto, the drummers, fiddlers, mandolin, guitarists and accordionists went in the house of taranta and stakeholders to play the music from at a frantic pace. Now the Tarantismo dance and sing for hours until they are exhausted. The belief, that while their energies were consumed in the dance, even the tarantula is consumed and destroyed. San Vito retains a remarkable tradition of pizzica that, unlike that of Lecce, appears free as a therapeutic repertoire and musical found only in this town. In the 1950s at least thirty players could be involved in the care of the tarantati.

=== Cuisine ===
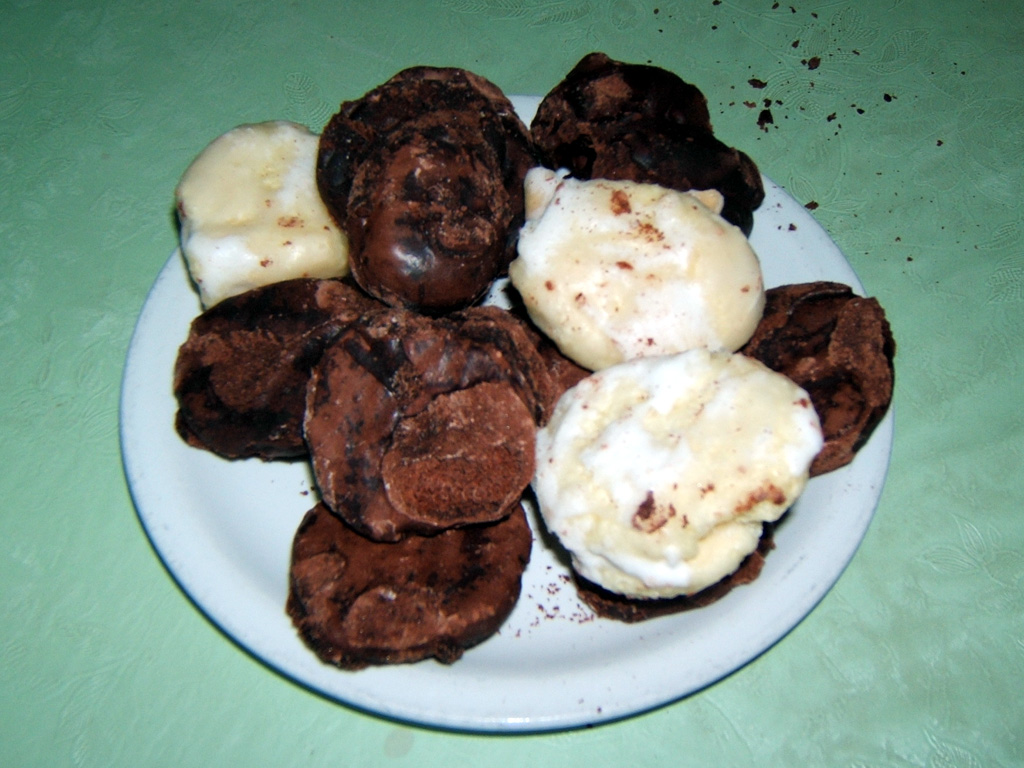
Mustazzueli

The sanvitese cucina is characterized by local traditional agricultural products. Local cuisine includes stuffed aubergines (maranciani chini), and traditional specialities made with mashed broad beans mixed with and vegetables (favi e fogghi). Other traditional dishes include "frise", round shaped hard bread soaked in water and topped with salt, with cherry tomatoes, olive oil and oregano and "gnummarieddi" or "turcinieddi", meat skewers made with lamb's innards. Sweets include the mustazzueli, chocolate dolcetti, sweet Carteddàte, Christmas cakes in the shape of thin pastry rosettes fried in hot oil, the cupeta cake with almonds, and very soft pettole balls of dough fried in hot oil. The municipality is a member of the olive oil coalition Collina di Brindisi and the wine coalition called Appia wines, which also includes the municipalities of Brindisi, Ostuni, Latiano and Mesagne. Almond milk is achieved by creating in an infusion of water with finely chopped almonds, and then squeezing them to bring out all the juice. Puglia Region has entered the almond milk in the list of traditional Italian food products. Limoncello is a liquor made from the peel of fresh lemon and enriched with water, sugar and alcohol to be enjoyed both as an apéritif and as a digestive after meals.

==== Wine ====
The territory of San Vito produces wines such as the Aleatico di Puglia Doc, Doc Ostuni, Puglia IGT. Along the road of the municipality, there are indigenous varieties of grapes, the Negroamaro, Primitivo, and Malvasia, which have been joined over the years by crops of white grape vines. Malvasia Nera di Brindisi is a grape of Greek origin and now widespread in most Mediterranean countries. Its wine, called Malmsey in English, is sweet with a golden hue. In Italy its cultivation has spread from Piedmont to Puglia. Vinified properly, it can also make a dry white wine. Sangiovese is a red grape variety, among the most widespread in Italy. Negroamaro Novoli vine that is also called "tears", has a special ability to produce rose to its chemical characteristics. Ottavianello leaves are pentagonal green, smooth, opaque and the lower surface light green.

== Notable Sanvitese ==
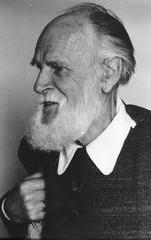
Lanza del Vasto

- Giacomo da San Vito (San Vito dei Normanni? - Naples, 1667): Friar, Franciscan Order of Reformed Minor, was a prolific artist and his works can be seen in many towns of Puglia and Basilicata.
- Leonardo Leo (San Vito dei Normanni, August 5, 1694 - Naples, October 31, 1744): Baroque composer and founder of Neapolitan Musical School of the 18th century;
- Vito Buonsanti (San Vito dei Normanni, June 22, 1762 - Naples, May 22, 1850): Supporters of the Republican movement, he became monk 's Dominican Order. He was a master in theology and writer was praised for his innovative ideas about teaching methods.
- Vito Donato Epifani (San Vito dei Normanni, June 23, 1848 - San Vito dei Normanni, August 15, 1922): jurist, professor of economics at the University of Naples, defense lawyer of poor and dispossessed, the author of numerous essays of political economy, and other literary works. He was elected mayor of San Vito for two terms and in 1886 during an outbreak of cholera worked to use influential friends and by using personal resources to coordinate help to the sick, thus meriting the official government recognition by Crispi.
- Lanza del Vasto (San Vito dei Normanni, September 29, 1901 - Murcia, January 5, 1981): poet, writer, philosopher, religious thinker with a strong mystical vein, but also founding patriarch of rural communities modeled on Gandhian non-violent activist against the Algerian war or nuclear weapons.
- Realino Marra (San Vito dei Normanni, October 8, 1956), full professor of philosophy of law, dean of the School of Social Sciences at University of Genoa.

== Events ==
During the year, the municipality organizes major cultural events:

- Focara of the Epiphany: January 6 in the square outside the Basilica, organized live concerts.
- Farfugghji Carnival: parade of floats leaves from the sports field and after covering the main streets to reach Piazza Leonardo Leo. Farfugghji is an eccentric and flirty name, untranslatable and derives from a dialectic expression.
- Holy Week: the rites are celebrated at the Basilica of Santa Maria della Vittoria.
  - Friday: "desolation", at the end of the procession is the rite of burial.
  - Saturday: Easter Vigil waiting for the parade of beautiful statues of many saints, which are taken from different churches in the city and come to the basilica.
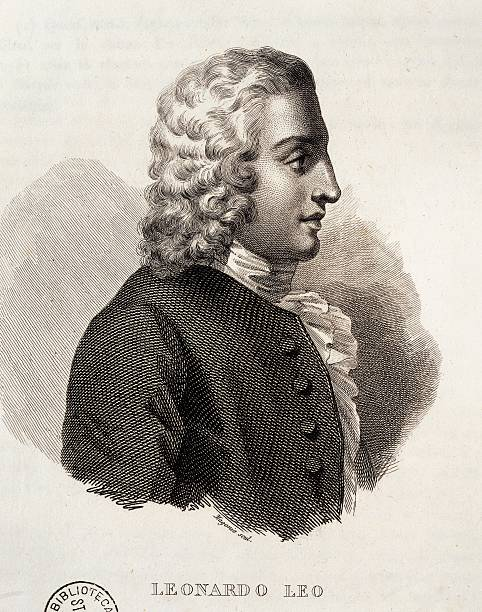
    Leonardo Leo
  - Easter: Procession of Christ and the resurrected saints.
- Patronal festival: June 15, the Feast of San Vito Martire, solemn procession with the silver statue of the saint.
- Il palio (prize): the beginning of the summer kicks off the competition between teams of different neighborhoods with challenge matches of soccer, volleyball, tug of war and also a road race.
- The Salento Finibus Terrae festival: Film festival of short films organized during the summer.
- Feast of Assumption: tasting and exhibition of local products and concert and dancing in the square with Pinches
- The Baroque Festival concerts and events related to Baroque music in honor of the composer Leonardo Leo with the objective of recovering the memory of the master composer.
- Sanvitesi Summer: organized by the city with cultural associations and individuals, provides for numerous concerts, exhibitions, screenings of films, musical performances, shows, cabaret, and theater.
- The "St. Vitus Dance" musical event traces the tradition of San Vito Tarantella.
- Christmas: a live nativity scene in the caves of San Biagio staged in the setting of the Byzantine sanctuary.

A variety of other cultural and educational events take place throughout the year, organised by or in conjunction with ExFadda L’officina del Sapere, a community based social enterprise at the heart of San Vito, including Coreutica a celebration of Mediterranean dance and music held in early August. Coreutica is hosted by World Music Academy and la Scuola di Pizzica di San Vito, with dance and music workshops and live events taking place in and around San Vito over the 5-6 day festival.

== Geography anthropogenic ==
The city originally developed around the Dentice Frasso castle; the old town that still retains the old urban structure of low buildings and small streets. During the 1970s, San Vito experienced a second major urban development with the creation of the "zone 167" north of the city. This neighborhood is home to many condominiums, but also has residences and villas. Neighborhoods include Li stratoddi / Center, Chianti, Gallo / Iaddu, San Franciscu / San Francis, Santa Rita, Area 167, and Zona PIP.

== Economy ==
San Vito dei Norman is primarily a center of agriculture and trade. The level of employment is above the provincial average.

=== Agriculture ===
As for the primary sector, livestock is not well developed with herds of cattle and sheep. Instead the agriculture industry relies on a thousand small and medium entrepreneurs engaged in intensive cultivation of fruits, vegetables, almonds and especially olives (Olea europea).

=== Craft and industry ===
Industry in the territory is present with 250 industrial companies and 17.96% of the workforce. The manufacturing sectors are agro-processing (like artichokes), but also mechanical, textile, packaging and wood processing companies.

=== Services and Tourism ===
The activity of the service sector is the fastest growing, with 17.22% of the employed labor force, found primarily in services of transportation and storage businesses, as well as real estate agents. Employment is now reduced in public administration because of the closure of the U.S. military base in the past. Lately, important experiments are being tried in tourism, allowing the industry to grow from year to year.

== Infrastructure and Roads ==
The main road links are represented by

- A14 Bologna - Taranto: known as Bari-Lecce Highway.
- SS 16 connects San Vito dei Normans to Carovigno and Ostuni.
- Brindisi-Lecce expressway connects San Vito dei Normans through the SS 16.
- Brindisi-Taranto connects San Vito dei Normanni to Taranto through the provincial roads 48, 45 and 44.

=== Railways ===
The station in San Vito dei Normanni, served by the Adriatic railway, is currently active with passenger service, but it served by only a few regional trains. The station is located ten kilometres (6.2 miles) from the city. The legend says that at the time of construction of the railroad, the prince did not want the "new infernal machine" to pass on its territories. The local service stations is ensured by the ESF in Ceglie Messapica and Francavilla Fontana.

== Twin Cities ==
- Salzwedel (Germany)
- Louviers (France)

== Sports ==
The San Vito Volley Volleyball team was founded in 1989 by the league President Luigi Sabatelli in the Series A of the Italian Women's volleyball championship. The Cogeir is a men's volleyball team and campaigning in the C series of the Men's Volleyball Regional Championship. The basketball team is in the Regional C Series. At youth level is also practiced by the company "Basketball San Vito. As for U.S. football, it plays in the San Vito Football Championship. Sport facilities include:

- F. Macchitella Sport Palace presents an outside field for football, a basketball court and two tennis courts open to the public, while the interior features a basketball court and volleyball. Made in the 1970s, was the subject of a recent expansion due to the growth of sports, especially in the case of volleyball.
- EM Citiolo Sports field.
- A. Broad Sports Ground Created in the 1990s in district 167.
- The Tennis Club
