= Chiesa di Santa Maria =

Chiesa di Santa Maria may refer to:

- Chiesa di Santa Maria di Costantinopoli
- Chiesa di Santa Maria del Soccorso
- Chiesa di Santa Maria a Cetrella
