= Raffaele Spanò =

Italian painter (1817–1863)

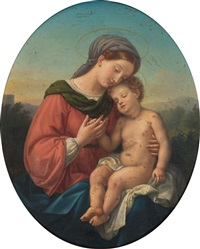
Madonna and Child by Raffaele Spanò

Raffaelle Spanò (1817–1863) was an Italian painter.

== Biography ==
Spanò was born in Naples, where he began his studies at the Royal Institute of Fine Arts of Naples. In 1833 he first submitted to the Exposition at the Institute, and from then to 1843, he won five silver medals. At the Exposition of 1845, he won the second class gold medal for: Holy Virgin and Child venerated by Saints Lucy and Lazarus, an altarpiece once in the church of Tutti i Santi in the borgo Sant'Antonio in Naples. His altarpiece of Virgin and the souls of Purgatory is found in Santa Maria del Soccorso in Arenella. In 1848, he won a gold medal for the painting depicting: Jacob accolto da Labano con Rachele, once found in Royal Palace of Naples. The same palace once held Spanò's Madonna col Bambino. In 1855, he won a first class gold medal for a large canvas depicting: Abigail placates David, acquired for the Royal Pinacoteca of Capodimonte. He painted also a Madonna del Platano (1859); a Madonna (sent to pope to decorate Pro Pontifice et Ecclesia). He was commissioned four large canvases for the Cathedral of Smyrna: St Peter and Paul; protectors of Smyrna; San Vincenzo di Paola and San Paolo. In church of Santa Lucia were two paintings: Immaculate Conception and St Francis of Assisi; and in the chapel of the Royal Palace of Naples: San Gennaro and San Bonifacio. In the interior of the Church of the Nunziatella located at the military academy at Pizzofalcone was a San Francesco di Paola con monsignore Girolamo degli Adorni. Among his works: Theseus battles the Minotaur, awarded a silver medal first class; and Prophet Jeremiah predicts the Ruin of Jerusalem, awarded a silver medal. Spanò painted a reproduction of the Madonna del Buon Consiglio di Genazzano now kept in the chapel of the Institute of the Ancelle del Sacro Cuore.

He was knighted into the Order of the Crown of Italy, Corresponding Associate of the Royal Academy of Fine Arts of Naples, member of the Royal Academy Raffaello in Urbino, honorary professor of the Royal Institute of Fine Arts in Naples, and member of the Director's Council of this Institute. His daughter Maria Spanò was a painter.
