= Roccaporena =

- Frazione
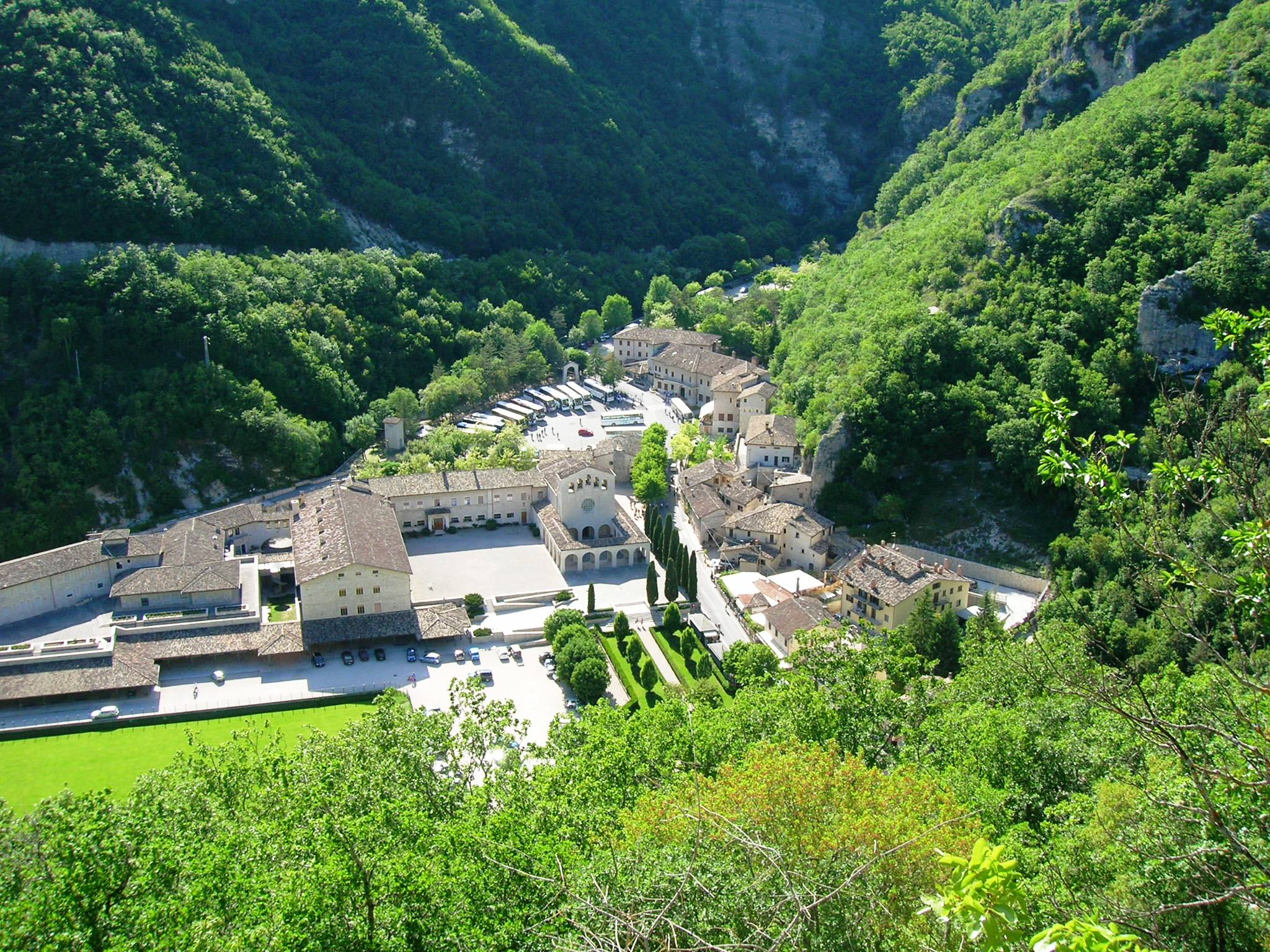
- Roccaporena

- Location within Italy
- Coordinates: 42°43′00″N 12°58′00″E
- Country: Italy
- Region: Umbria
- Province: Perugia
- Comune: Cascia
- Elevation: 707 m (2,320 ft)

Population (2001)
  - Total: 73
- Time zone: UTC+1 (CET)
  - Summer (DST): UTC+2 (CEST)
- Postcode: 06043
- Area code: 0743

Roccaporena is a frazione of the comune (municipality) of Cascia, Umbria, central Italy. It is located at 707 m of altitude, and, according to 2001 census, it had 71 inhabitants.

== Overview ==
Roccaporena is known to have existed since the Middle Ages: in 1381 Saint Rita of Cascia was born here. The scoglio di Santa Rita ("Rock of St. Rita") is traditionally believed to be the place where she prayed. Roccaporena is also the site of the saint's house, dating to the 14th century, with the adjoining Orto del Miracolo ("Miracle Orchard"), and the 13th-century church of San Montano, where St. Rita married. One of the highlights of St Rita's house is a 17th-century painting by Luca Giordano.
