= Steven Popkes =

American science fiction author

- Born: Steven Earl Popkes; October 9, 1952 (age 73); Santa Monica, California, U.S.
- Occupation: Writer
- Writing career
- Period: 1982–present
- Genre: Science fiction
- Notable works: "The Color Winter" (1988), Slow Lightning (1991)
- Website: www.stevenpopkes.com

Steven Earl Popkes (born October 9, 1952) is an American science fiction writer, known primarily for his short fiction. He was nominated for the Nebula and Sturgeon Awards for the short story "The Color Winter" (1988).

== Career ==
Steven Popkes was born in Santa Monica, California. He attended the Clarion Writers Workshop in 1978, and his first story, "A Capella Blues", was published in Isaac Asimov's Science Fiction Magazine in May 1982.

Popkes has published more than 45 short works of fiction. He was a Nebula and Sturgeon Award finalist for the story "The Color Winter" (1988). In the late 1980s, he was involved in the Future Boston collaboration, a project where a number of Boston area science fiction writers contributed stories set in a common future, where the city of Boston is slowly sinking underwater. One of his more acclaimed stories, "The Egg" (Asimov's, January 1989) is set in the future Boston history, and was later incorporated into his short novel Slow Lightning (1991). His other novels include Caliban Landing (1987), Welcome to Witchlandia (2016), God's Country (2020), Jackie's Boy (2020), Danse Mécanique (2021) and House of Birds (2021). Steven has published a collection of short fiction as well, Simple Things: Collected Stories (2019).

Popkes was part of the Readercon panels "Global Warming and Science Fiction" (2010) and "Have We Lost the Future?" (2012). He lives in the Boston area.

== Bibliography ==
=== Novels ===
- Popkes, Steven (1987). Caliban Landing. Congdon & Weeds.

=== Short fiction ===
Title	Year	Magazine	Notes
The Secret Lives of Fairy Tales	2010	F&SF	Popkes, Steven (January–February 2010). "The Secret Lives of Fairy Tales". The Magazine of Fantasy & Science Fiction. Vol. 118, no. 1&2. pp. 167–178.
Sudden, Broken, and Unexpected	2012	Asimov's	Popkes, Steven (December 2012). "Sudden, Broken, and Unexpected". Asimov's Science Fiction. Vol. 36, no. 12. pp. 74–106.
