= Pier Palma da Fermo =

Italian painter

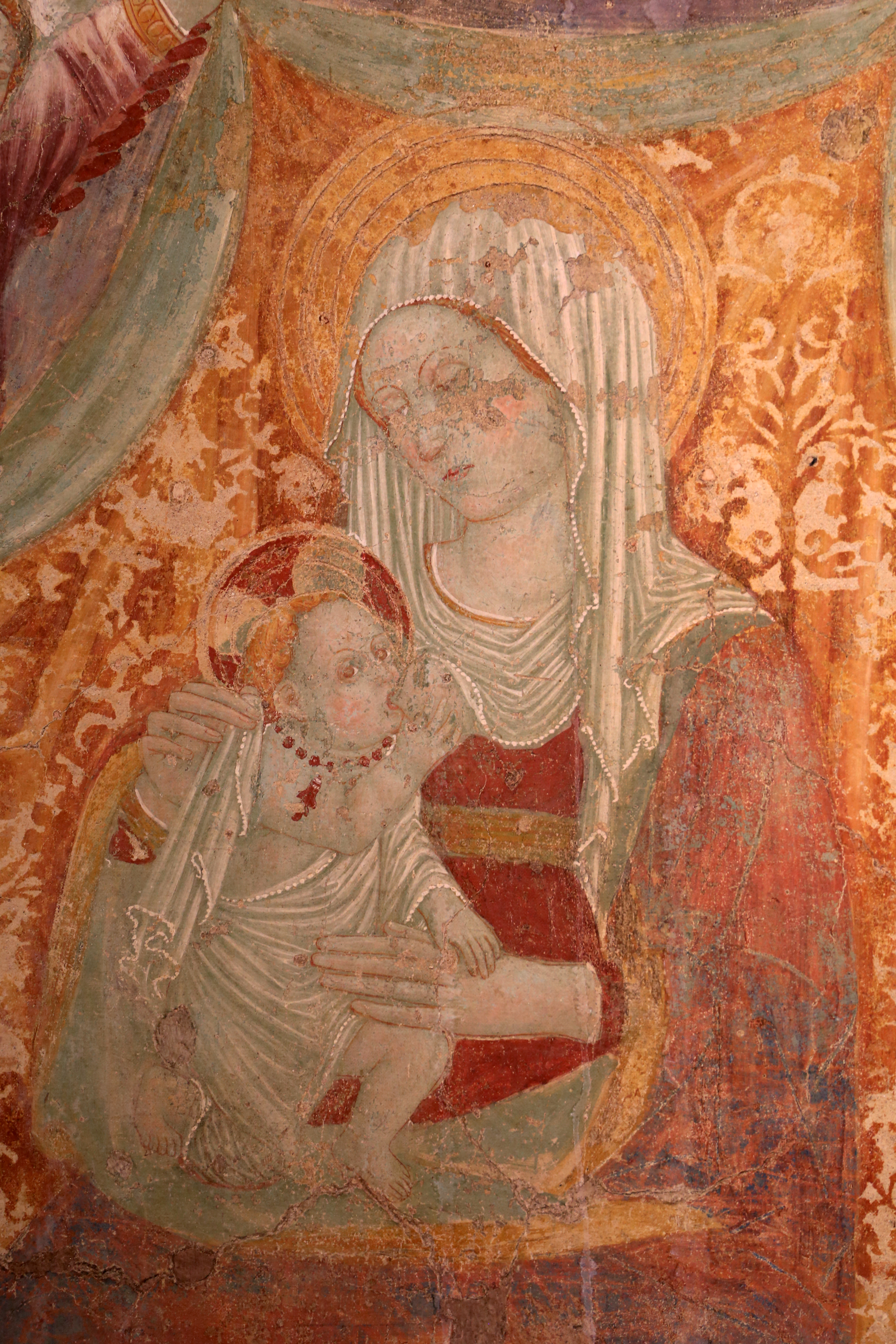
Madonna del Latte, San Ginesio

Pier Palma da Fermo (15th century) was an Italian painter in the provinces of Fermo and Macerata. He painted a venerated image (1475) of the Madonna della Misericordia for the church of the Madonna della Misericordia, Petriolo. The municipality of Monte Urano restored his fresco of the Madonna delle Nevi.
