= Maria Spanò =

19th Century Italian Painter

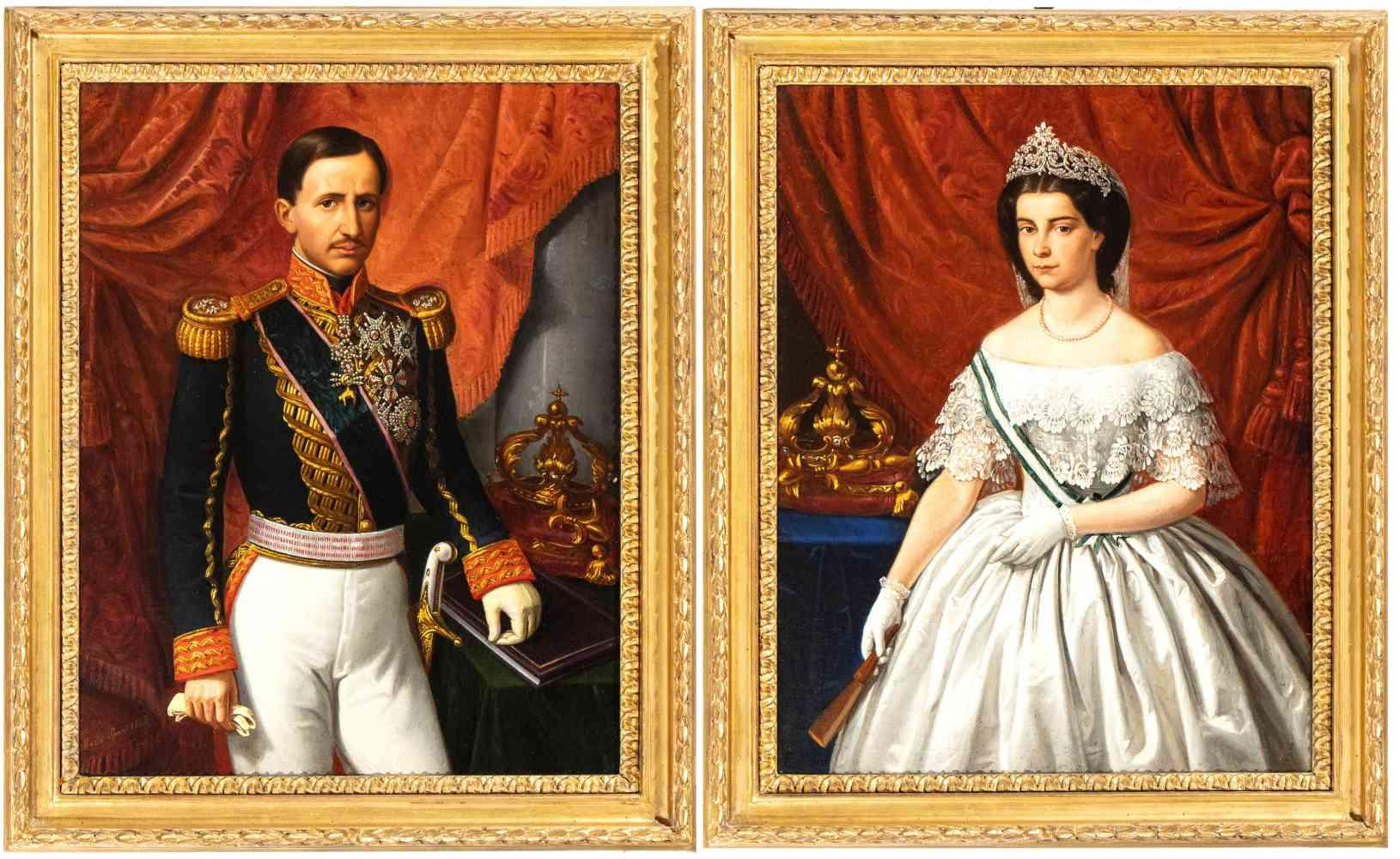
Portraits of Franz Bourbon II and Maria Sophie of Bavaria by Maria Spanò

Maria Spanò (25 September 1843 – 1880) was an Italian painter.

Spanò was born in Naples, and initially trained under her father, Raffaele Spanò. She chose a variety of subjects, painting genre, landscapes, and history paintings. She was also well respected as a portraitist and painter of still life with flowers. At the 1859 Exposition in Naples, she displayed a half-figure painting of a Peasant woman of Sorrento, garnering a silver medal of merit. At an Expositions della Promotrice of Naples, she exhibited A Confidence, acquired by the Pinacoteca of Capodimonte. She completed two canvases bought by the Provincial Council of Naples, depicting life-sized Two Peasants and Un cortile di campagna. In another exposition she displayed La villa Mays. Among other works, she completed Bice al castello di Rosate.
