= Basilica of Santa Rita of Cascia =

Church and convent in Umbria, Italy

Coordinates: 42.718761°N 13.012670°E

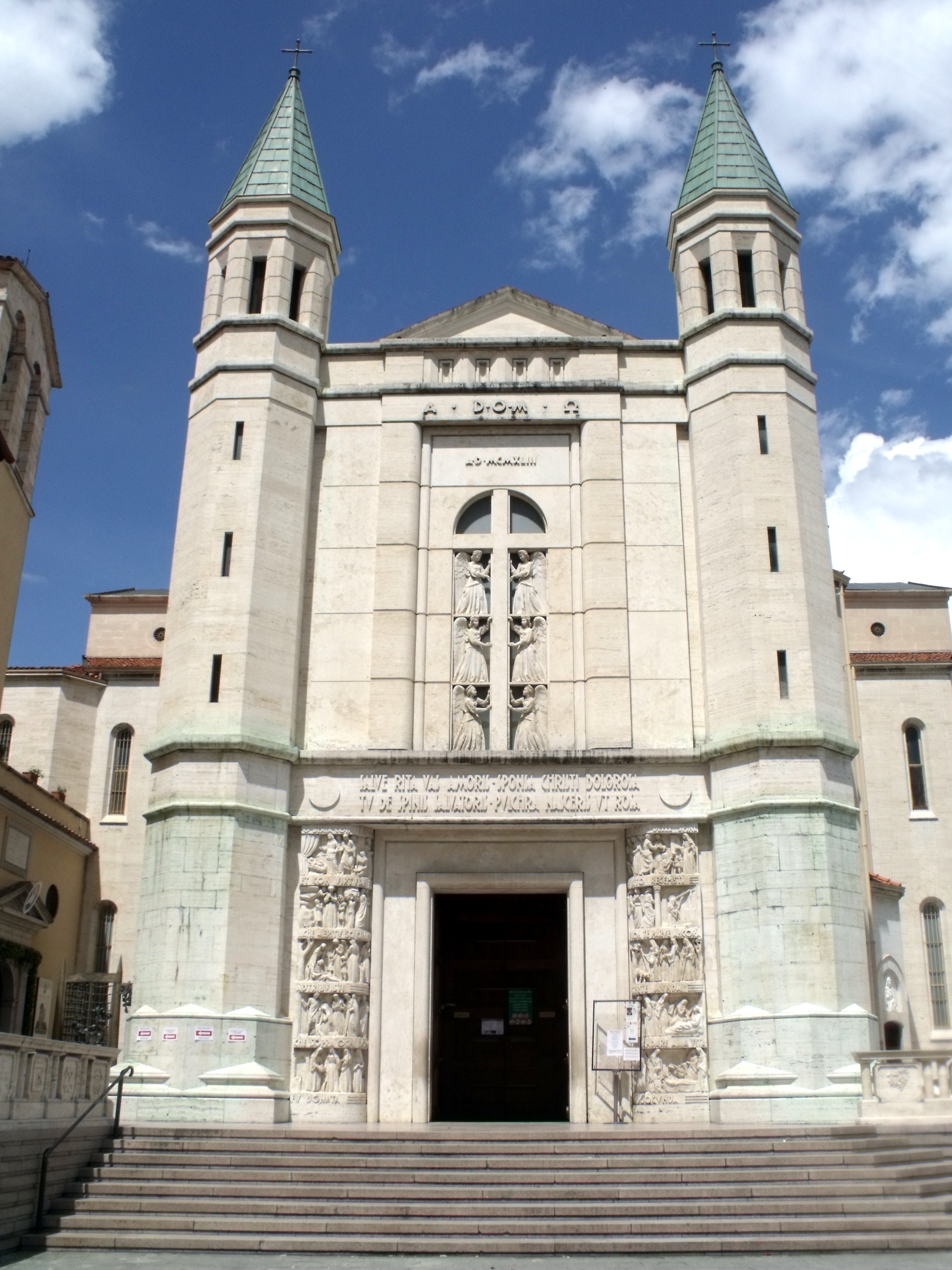
Basilica of Santa Rita of Cascia

The Basilica of Santa Rita of Cascia is a 20th-century Roman Catholic minor basilica church, sanctuary, and convent located in the town of Cascia, province of Perugia, region of Umbria, Italy.

== History ==
The basilica was built in the early twentieth century to provide a larger church to house the much visited relics of the former nun, Saint Rita of Cascia, who was canonized in 1900. The initial impulse was guided by the Abbess Maria Teresa Fasce, now considered a blessed individual by the Roman Catholic church. Lacking the money for the construction of a church, some funds were initially raised by subscriptions to a journal titled Dalle Api alle Rose and a donation by Pope Benedict XV. In 1931, the Pope Pius XI added further funding, and a plan was elaborated by the engineer Maria Spirito Chiapetta, and the architects Giuseppe Calori and Giuseppe Martinenghi. The first stone was deposited on June 20, 1937, by cardinal Enrico Gasparri, and construction concluded in 1947. In 1955, Pope Pius XII elevated the church to the rank of a minor basilica.

The facade of the basilica is dressed with white travertine from Tivoli. The layout is centralized in the form of a Greek cross. The portal is sculpted by Eros Pellini with scenes from the life of Santa Rita. The interior has extensive fresco work, completed by Luigi Montanarini, Luigi Filocamo, Silvio Consadori, Gisberto Ceracchini and Cesarino Vicenzi. The main altar was designed by Giacomo Manzù.
