= Madonna della Misericordia, Petriolo =

Church in Petriolo, Marche, Italy

Coordinates: 43°13′16″N 13°27′58″E

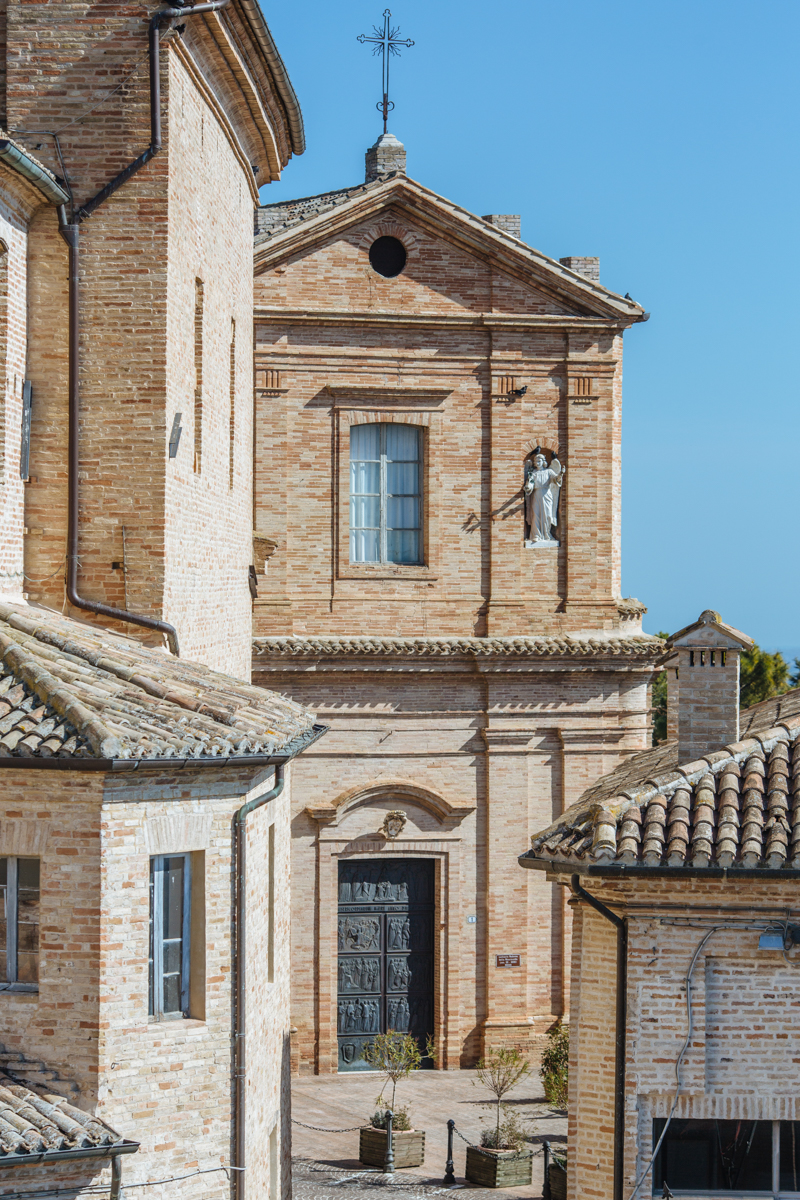
Chiesa della Madonna della Misericordia

The Chiesa della Madonna della Misericordia is a Roman Catholic church located on Piazza San Martino in the town of Petriolo, province of Macerata, region of Marche, Italy. It stands facing both the Palazzo Communale and the church of Santi Martino e Marco.

== History ==
The church was built in 1496, and enlarged in the 18th century under the direction of Pietro Augustoni. The niches on the second story of the façade contain statues depicting an Annunciation by Nello Cruciani. The bell tower is slender and peaked.

The main altar has a wooden statue of the Madonna della Misericordia (1525) by Antonio Aquilano. The church has frescoes by Ciro Pavisa. The main altar also has a fresco depicting the Madonna della Misericordia and Child (circa 1475) attributed to Pier Palma da Fermo; the fresco was restored in 2014, removing overpainting from the 19th century. Adjacent to the church, in a house used by a confraternity is the Museo dei Legni Processionale Monsignor M. Manfroni. The museum now houses paintings by De Magistris and Durante Nobili.
