= Madonna della Grazie, Petriolo =

Roman Catholic church in Marche, Italy

Coordinates: 43°13′07″N 13°27′33″E

The Chiesa della Madonna della Grazie is a Roman Catholic church located just outside the town of Petriolo, at the point where the Strada provincial 36 splits toward either Mogliano or the Abbey of Fiastra and Macerata, in the province of Macerata, region of Marche, Italy.

== History ==
The small brick church is located on the road from Petriolo to Mogliano. The church was built in the second half of the 18th century in simple Neoclassical lines, and houses a venerated fresco depicting a standing forward-facing Madonna and Child, felt to be miraculous.

The main altarpiece depicts Saints Martini and Mark on the local landscape, painted by Luigi Fontana (1827-1908).
