= Santi Martino e Marco, Petriolo =

Roman Catholic parish church in Marche, Italy

Coordinates: 43°13′16″N 13°27′57″E

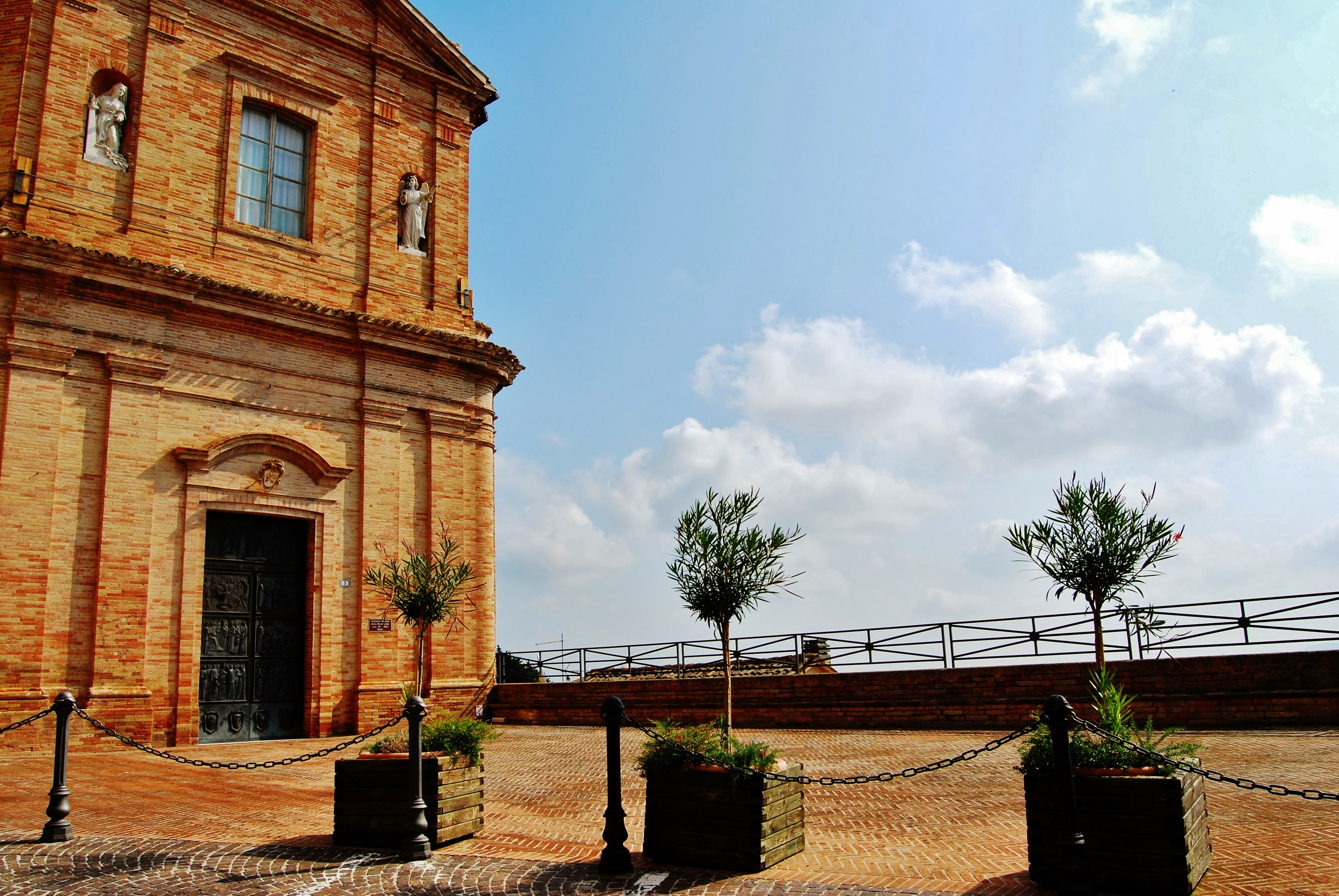

Santi Martino e Marco is a Neoclassical-style, Roman Catholic parish church located on Piazza di San Martino in the town of Petriolo, province of Macerata, region of Marche, Italy. The church stands alongside and across the street from the Palazzo Communale and faces the church of the Madonna della Misericordia across the Piazza.

== History ==
The church was built in 1776 and consecrated in 1790 by the archbishop of Fermo. The brick facade with pilasters and a portal with a rounded pediment is sober. It is flanked by a tall bell tower.
