= Sisters of the Vast Black =

2019 science fiction novella by Lina Rather

- Official cover art for Sisters of the Vast Black
- Author: Lina Rather
- Language: English
- Genre: Science fiction literature
- Set in: Outer space
- Publisher: Tor.com
- Publication date: 29 October 2019
- Pages: 176
- ISBN: 1250260264
- Followed by: Sisters of the Forsaken Stars
- Website: https://linarather.com/sisters-of-the-vast-black/

Sisters of the Vast Black is a 2019 LGBT science fiction novella, the debut novella by Lina Rather. It features a group of spacefaring Roman Catholic nuns performing charity work across the galaxy; eventually, they discover a conspiracy that will test their faith.

The novella was a finalist for the 2020 Theodore Sturgeon Award.

== Plot ==
Decades prior to the start of the novella, a civil war between Earth Central Governance and its colony planets lead to the loss of Earth's authority. Millions of people died as a result of warfare and biological terrorism.

The Order of St. Rita is a group of Roman Catholic nuns who live on the spaceship Our Lady of Impossible Constellations. The ship is a living organism resembling a slug. They travel to rural colony planets to perform charity work; as part of their mission, they visit a colony on the moon Phoyongosa III, where they bless marriages and perform baptisms.

The Mother Superior is suffering from the early stages of dementia, leading to a crisis among the sisters. At the same time, the Earth Central Governance sends a priest to join the ship's crew, reasserting control over the previously independent sisters. Sister Gemma decides to leave the order when she falls in love with an engineer named Vauca.

The ship received a distress signal from Phoyongosa III; the colonists are suffering from ringeye, a deadly plague. The nuns and Vauca's crew respond, only to find that Earth Central Governance has unleashed the plague in order to trigger another war and regain their power. The Mother Superior reveals that she was previously a member of Earth Central Governance before becoming a nun, and that her husband designed ringeye as a biological warfare agent. As penance, she takes the Our Lady on a suicide attack against Earth's ships. This allows the other nuns to join Vauca's ship, land safely, and save some of the colonists. After this, remaining nuns declare independence from the Catholic Church and vow to continue their mission of servitude and charity.

== Themes ==
The novel discusses the ethics of space colonization. It also discusses the ways in which religious proselytism can be used as a tool of political control.

The novella also features a series of dichotomies. The contrast between science and religion is featured when the nuns debate whether it is permissible for their ship to mate. Sister Gemma must choose between following her vows and her love for another woman. The female nuns are contrasted with the young male priest from Rome; this conflict evokes similar contrast between modern-day activist nuns who have disagreed with the official positions of the Vatican.

== Reception ==
The novella received positive reviews. One reviewer praised its strong worldbuilding, characterization, and satisfying conclusion; others praised it as "accomplished, thoughtful" and compared it positively to the novellas of Lois McMaster Bujold and Martha Wells. A reviewer for Locus called it "elegant and eloquent ... warm and forgiving, with an explosive conclusion". A reviewer for Paste praised the pacing and felt that the novel succeeded in exploring big themes despite its small page count.

Publishers Weekly gave the novel a moderately positive review. Their review praised the author's "expert control" over her characters and world, but found the novel's abrupt ending to be its "only significant flaw".

Sisters of the Vast Black was a finalist for the 2020 Theodore Sturgeon Award.

A sequel, Sisters of the Forsaken Stars, was announced in August 2021, and published February 22, 2022.
