= Gregory Feeley =

American teacher, critic, essayist and author

- Born: March 3, 1955 (age 71); Philadelphia, Pennsylvania, US
- Occupation: Author
- Writing career
- Genre: speculative fiction
- Website: www.gregoryfeeley.com

Gregory Patrick Feeley is an American teacher, critic, essayist and author of speculative fiction, active in the field since 1972. He writes as Gregory Feeley, with some of his early works appearing under the name Greg Feeley.

== Biography ==
Feeley resides with his family in Connecticut, where he teaches part-time at a local community college.

== Literary career ==
Feeley began writing as a critic and essays, later concentrating on fiction. His short fiction has received two Nebula Award nominations, and his first novel, The Oxygen Barons, was on the final ballot for the 1990 Philip K. Dick Award.

His fiction has appeared in various periodicals, including Asimov's Science Fiction, Clarkesworld, Interzone, Isaac Asimov's Science Fiction Magazine, Lightspeed, and Science Fiction Age, and the anthologies Alien Pregnant by Elvis, Alternate Outlaws, Alternate Skiffy, Alternate Tyrants, Ascents of Wonder, Best Short Novels: 2005, Beyond the Last Star: Stories from the Next Beginning, Clarkesworld Year Ten: Volume Two, Deals with the Devil, Dinosaur Fantastic, Enchanted Forests, Fantasy: The Best of the Year: 2006 Edition, The First Heroes: New Tales of the Bronze Age, Full Spectrum 4, In the Shadow of the Towers: Speculative Fiction in a Post-9/11 World, Mission Critical, Nebula Awards 33, Otherworldly Maine, The Shimmering Door, Sorceries, A Starfarer's Dozen: Stories of Things to Come, Starlight 1, Tel: Stories, Weird Tales from Shakespeare, The Year's Best Fantasy and Horror: Eighth Annual Collection, The Year's Best Science Fiction: Fourteenth Annual Collection, and The Year's Best Science Fiction & Fantasy 2017.

Feeley's essays have appeared in Absolute Magnitude, Ansible, Endzone, Foundation, Interzone, Locus, The New York Review of Science Fiction, SFWA Bulletin, Thrust, Vector, and Works of Art.

== Bibliography ==
=== Novels ===
- The Oxygen Barons (1990)
- Arabian Wine (2005)
- Hamlet the Magician (forthcoming)

=== Collections ===
- Kentauros (2010)

=== Short fiction ===
- "The Light at the End of the Penumbra" (1977) [only as by Greg Feeley]
- "Neptune's Reach" (1986)
- "A Different Drumstick" (1988)
- "The Boulevard of Broken Domes" (1991)
- "The Mind's Place" (1993)
- "Thirteen Ways of Looking at a Dinosaur" (1993)
- "Reversals" (1993)
- "Aweary of the Sun" (1994)
- "Passion for the Souls Below" (1994)
- "Printer's Devils" (1994)
- "My Tongue in Thy Tale" (1994) (collected in Mike Resnick's alternate history anthology Alternate Outlaws)
- "In Fear of Little Nell" (1995)
- "Ursa Minor" (1995)
- "How Far To Th' End of the World?" (1995)
- "The Crab Lice" (1996)
- "The Drowning Cell" (1996)
- "The Weighing of Ayre" (1996)
- "Scatchophily" (1997)
- "On the Ice Islands" (1997)
- "The Truest Chill" (1997)
- "Animae Celestes" (1998)
- "Ladies in their Letters" (1999)
- "Spirit of the Place" (2000)
- "False Vacuum" (2002)
- "Arabian Wine" (2004)
- "Giliad" (2004)
- "Fancy Bread" (2005)
- "Awskonomuk" (2008)
- "The Bridge of Dreams" (2016)
- "Hanging Gardens" (2019)

== Awards ==
The Oxygen Barons was a finalist for the 1991 Philip K. Dick Award. "Thirteen Ways of Looking at a Dinosaur" was a preliminary nominee for the 1995 Nebula Award for Best Short Story. "The Weighing of Ayre" placed third in the 1997 Theodore Sturgeon Award for Best short fiction and was a preliminary nominee for the 1998 Nebula Award for Best Novella. "On the Ice Islands" placed eighth in the 1998 Asimov's Readers' Poll for Best Novelette, and twentieth in the 1998 Locus Poll Award for Best Novelette. "The Crab Lice" was nominated for the 1998 Nebula Award for Best Short Story. "The Truest Chill" was nominated for the 1999 Nebula Award for Best Novelette. "Animae Celestes," was a finalist for the 1999 Sturgeon Award for Best Short Fiction and a preliminary nominee for the 2000 Nebula Award for Best Novelette. "Spirit of the Place" was a preliminary nominee for the 2002 Nebula Award for Best Novella. Arabian Wine placed twelfth in the 2005 Locus Poll Award for Best Novella and was a finalist for the 2005 Sturgeon Award for Best Short Fiction. "Giliad" placed eighteenth in the 2005 Locus Poll Award for Best Novella.
