= Petriolo =

- Comune
- Comune di Petriolo
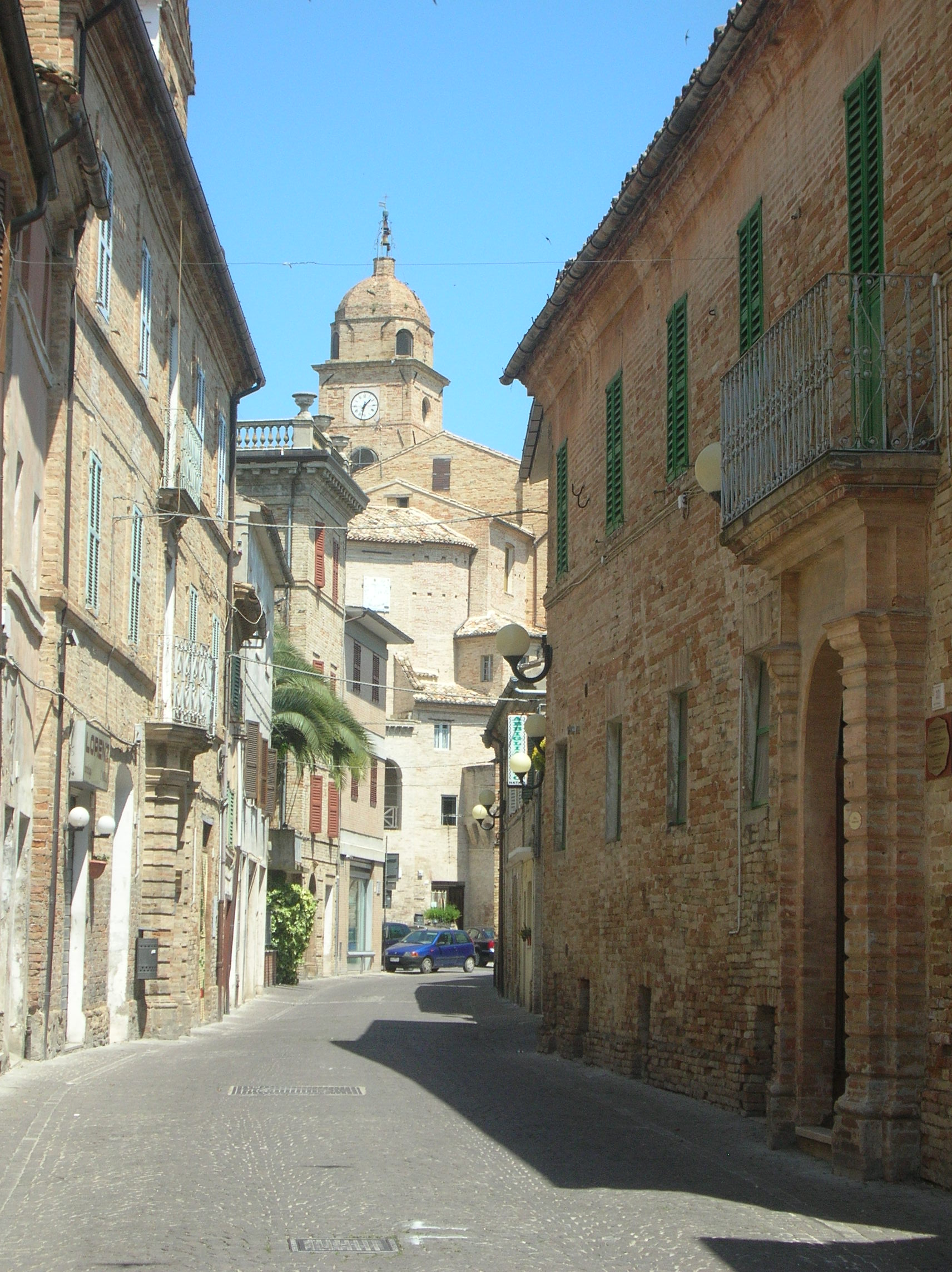

- Location within Italy Location within Marche
- Coordinates: 43°13′N 13°26′E
- Country: Italy
- Region: Marche
- Province: Province of Macerata (MC)

Area
  - Total: 15.6 km^{2} (6.0 sq mi)

Population (Dec. 2004)
  - Total: 2,063
  - Density: 132/km^{2} (343/sq mi)
- Time zone: UTC+1 (CET)
  - Summer (DST): UTC+2 (CEST)
- Postal code: 62010
- Dialing code: 0733

Petriolo is a comune (municipality) in the Province of Macerata in the Italian region Marche, located about 45 kilometres (28 mi) south of Ancona and about 9 kilometres (6 mi) south of Macerata. As of 31 December 2004, it had a population of 2,063 and an area of 15.6 square kilometres (6.0 mi^{2}).

Petriolo borders the following municipalities: Corridonia, Loro Piceno, Mogliano, Tolentino, Urbisaglia.

Among the churches in the town are:

- Madonna della Misericordia
- Madonna della Grazie
- Santa Maria a Petriolo
- Santa Maria del Soccorso
- Santi Martino e Marco

== Demographic evolution ==
Historical population

Year	Pop.	±%
1861	2,262	—
1871	2,359	+4.3%
1881	2,330	−1.2%
1901	2,467	+5.9%
1911	2,495	+1.1%

Year	Pop.	±%
1921	2,491	−0.2%
1931	2,242	−10.0%
1936	2,294	+2.3%
1951	2,263	−1.4%
1961	2,019	−10.8%

Year	Pop.	±%
1971	1,906	−5.6%
1981	1,962	+2.9%
1991	1,977	+0.8%
2001	2,049	+3.6%

Source: Data from ISTAT
