= Specchiolla =

- Frazione di Specchiolla
- Location within Italy
- Coordinates: 40°44′16″N 17°44′10″E
- Country: Italy
- Region: Apulia
- Province: Province of Brindisi
- City: Carovigno
- Elevation: 0 m (0 ft)
- Time zone: UTC+1 (CET)
  - Summer (DST): UTC+2 (CET)
- ZIP codes: 72012
- Area code: 0831

Specchiolla is an Italian resort on the Adriatic Sea. It is a frazione of the city of Carovigno and near the city of San Vito dei Normanni, located in the southern part of the region of Apulia, in the province of Brindisi.

== Geography ==
Specchiolla is located on the Salento peninsula, on the Adriatic coast.

Its distances from its surrounding cities are:

- 9 km from San Vito dei Normanni,
- 10 km from Carovigno,
- 17 km from San Michele Salentino,
- 18 km from Ostuni,
- 20 km from Brindisi.

== History ==
In the past, Specchiolla belonged to the city of San Vito dei Normanni. Because the local nobility was known to engage in gambling activities, legend narrates that the Prince of San Vito dei Normanni lost Specchiolla in a wager with his cousin, Prince of the neighboring city of Carovigno. Because Sanvitesi are the most numerous vacationers in Specchiolla, they reproach their rival neighbors of Carovigno for their insufficient attention to the conservation of this resort.

In the 21st century, entertainment and tourism continues in the frazione, centered on Lido Bianco (the White Beach).

== Religion ==
The pilgrim route of Via Francigena, which goes from France to Bari, traverses Specchiolla. The convent of Santa Maria del Soccorso was founded by nuns in 1500 to serve the needs of pilgrims. La Chiesa di Santa Maria Goretti (the church of Saint Mary of Goretti) continues to serve the spiritual needs of pilgrims, locals, and beach holiday vacationers into the 21st century.
