= Rita of Cascia =

15th-century Italian Augustinian nun and saint

Saint Rita of Cascia OSA
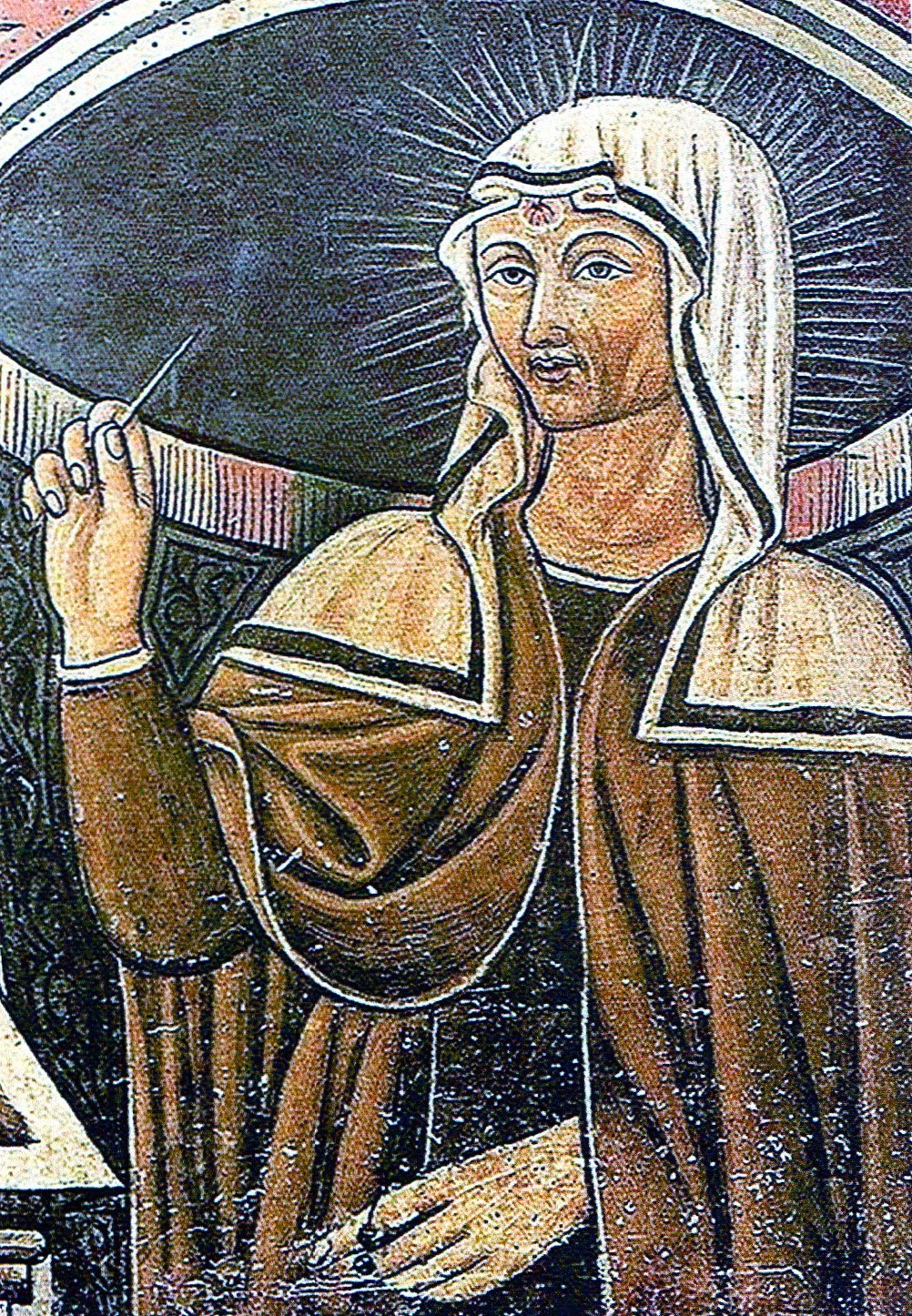
- Portrait of St. Rita, detail from the casket that held her body, Sanctuary of Cascia.

Widow and Religious Confessor
- Born: 1381; Roccaporena, Perugia, Papal States
- Died: 22 May 1457 (aged 75–76); Cascia, Perugia, Papal States
- Venerated in: Catholic Church
- Beatified: 1626 by Pope Urban VIII
- Canonized: 24 May 1900, St. Peter's Basilica by Pope Leo XIII
- Major shrine: Basilica of Santa Rita da Cascia, Cascia, Perugia, Italy
- Feast: 22 May
- Attributes: Forehead wound, rose, bees, grape vine
- Patronage: Lost and impossible causes, sickness, wounds, couples and marital problems, abuse, mothers
- Controversy: Spousal abuse, feud, family honor, loneliness

Rita of Cascia (born Margherita Ferri Lotti; 1381 – 22 May 1457), was an Italian Catholic widow and Augustinian nun. After Rita's husband died, she joined a small community of nuns who later became Augustinians. Therein, she was known both for practicing mortification of the flesh and for the efficacy of her prayers. Various miracles are attributed to her intercession, and she is often portrayed with a bleeding wound on her forehead, which is understood to indicate partial stigmata.

Pope Leo XIII canonized Rita on 24 May 1900. Her feast day is celebrated on 22 May. At her canonization ceremony, she was bestowed the title of "Patroness of Impossible Causes". In many Catholic countries, Rita also came to be known as the patroness of abuse victims, couples and marriage difficulties, widows, and the sick. Her bodily remains lie in the Basilica of Santa Rita of Cascia in Umbria.

== Early life ==
Margherita Ferri Lotti was born in 1381 (or 1371, according to other sources) in Roccaporena, a small hamlet near Cascia, Umbria, where various sites connected with her are the focus of pilgrimages. Her name, Margherita, means "pearl". She was affectionately called Rita, the short form of her baptismal name. Her parents, Antonio Lotti and Amata Ferri, were known to be noble, charitable people, who gained the epithet Conciliatori di Cristo (English: Peacemakers of Christ).

Rita married Paolo di Ferdinando di Mancino; this either occurred around 1385, or, according to Catholic News Agency, when she was 12. Her parents opposed her desire to enter a convent, and she submitted by marrying a man described as exceedingly bad-tempered. The marriage lasted for 18 years, during which she was remembered for her Christian values as a model wife and mother who made efforts to convert her husband from his abusive behavior.

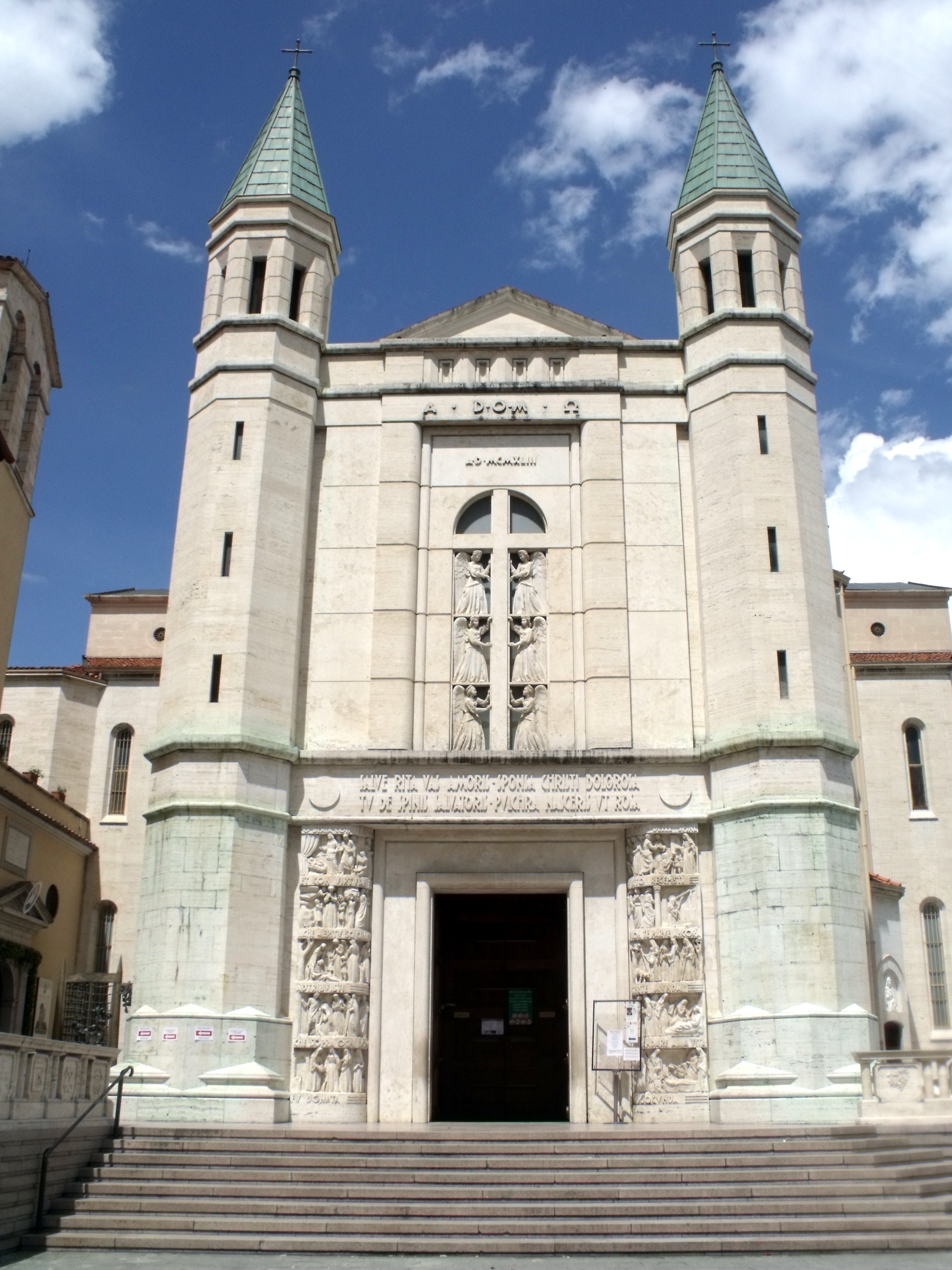
Basilica of Saint Rita at Cascia

Through prayer, patience, and an ability to pacify, Rita helped her husband slowly live a more authentically Christian way of life. Rita eventually bore two sons, Giangiacomo and Paolo Maria. Paolo Mancini became the victim of a family conflict and was murdered while their sons were still young.

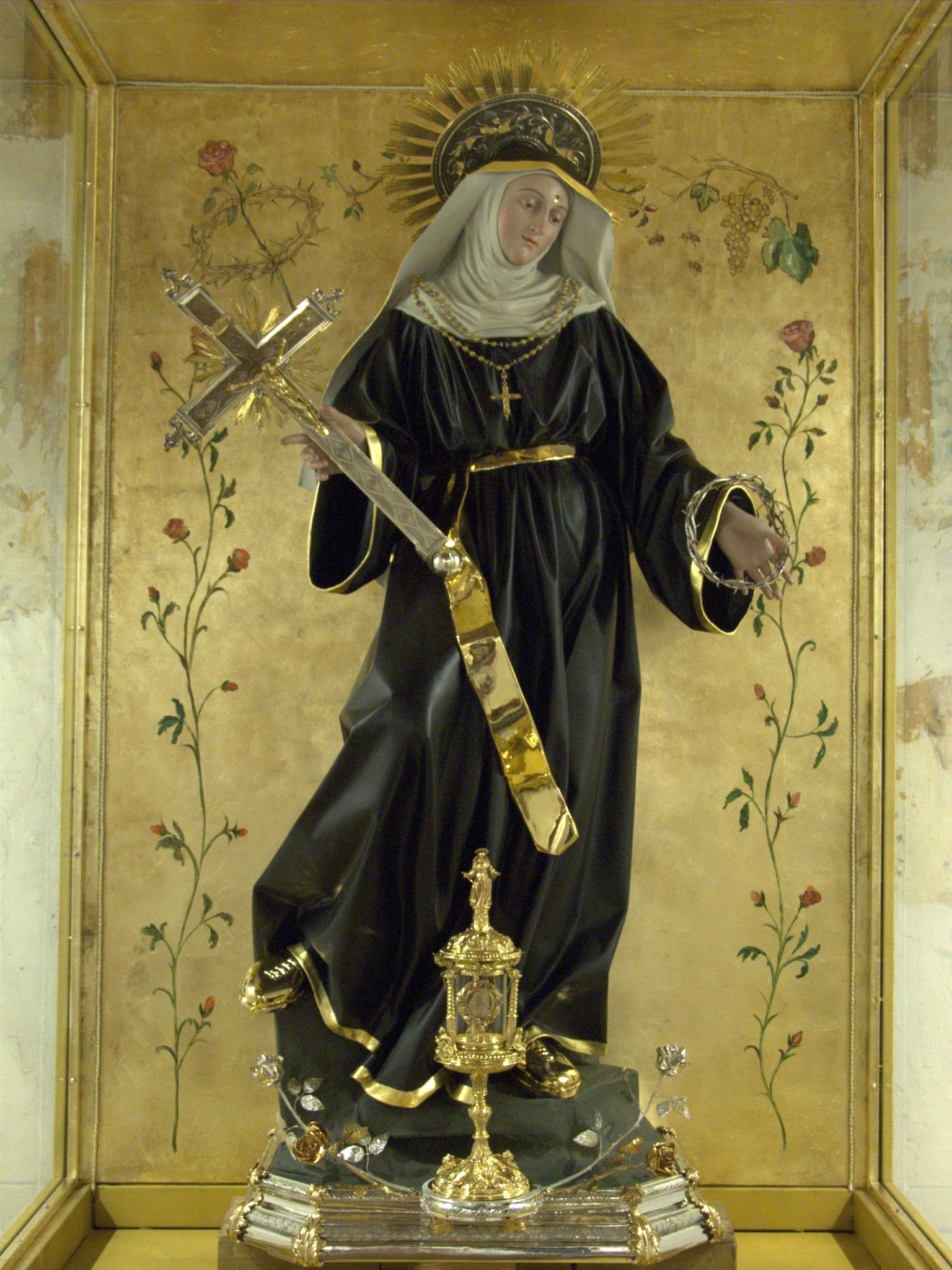
Santa Rita da Cascia (San Giovanni la Punta)

Rita gave a public pardon at Paolo's funeral to her husband's murderers. Paolo Mancini's brother, Bernardo, was said to have continued the feud and hoped to convince Rita's sons to seek revenge. Bernardo convinced Rita's sons to leave their manor and live at the Mancini villa ancestral home. As her sons grew, their characters began to change as Bernardo became their tutor. Rita's sons wished to avenge their father's murder. Rita, fearing that her sons would lose their souls, tried to dissuade them from retaliating, but to no avail. She asked God to remove her sons from the cycle of vendettas and prevent mortal sin and murder. Her sons died of dysentery a year later, which pious Catholics believe was God's answer to her prayer, taking them by natural death rather than risk them committing a mortal sin punishable by Hell.

According to the 18th-century hagiographer Carlo Massini, it was Rita herself who had prayed that God would kill her sons rather than allow them to avenge their father.

== Later life ==
After the deaths of her husband and sons, Rita desired to enter the monastery of Saint Mary Magdalene in Cascia, but was turned away. Although the convent acknowledged Rita's good character and piety, the nuns were afraid of being associated with her due to the scandal of her husband's violent death and because she was not a virgin. However, Rita persisted in her cause and was given a condition before the convent could accept her; she was given the task of reconciling her family with her husband's murderers. She implored her three patron saints (John the Baptist, Augustine of Hippo, and Nicholas of Tolentino) to assist her, and she set about the task of establishing peace between the hostile parties of Cascia. Popular religious tales recall that the bubonic plague, which ravaged Italy at the time, infected Bernardo Mancini, causing him to relinquish his desire to feud any longer with the Chiqui family. She was able to resolve the conflicts between the families, and at the age of 36, was allowed to enter the monastery.

Pious Catholic legends later recount that Rita was transported into the monastery of Saint Mary Magdalene via levitation at night into the garden courtyard by her three patron saints. According to Cavallucci, the abbess of the monastery put Rita's vocation and obedience to the test by making her water a dry vine bush in the cloister of the monastery. The wood, after some time, came back to life and bore fruit. In the same cloister, today, a vine dating back to the 19th century remains. During her 40 years of monastic life, Rita not only dedicated herself to prayer, penance, and fasting in the monastery, but also she often went out to serve the poor and sick of Cascia .

She remained at the monastery, living by the Augustinian Rule, until her death from tuberculosis on 22 May 1457.

== Veneration ==
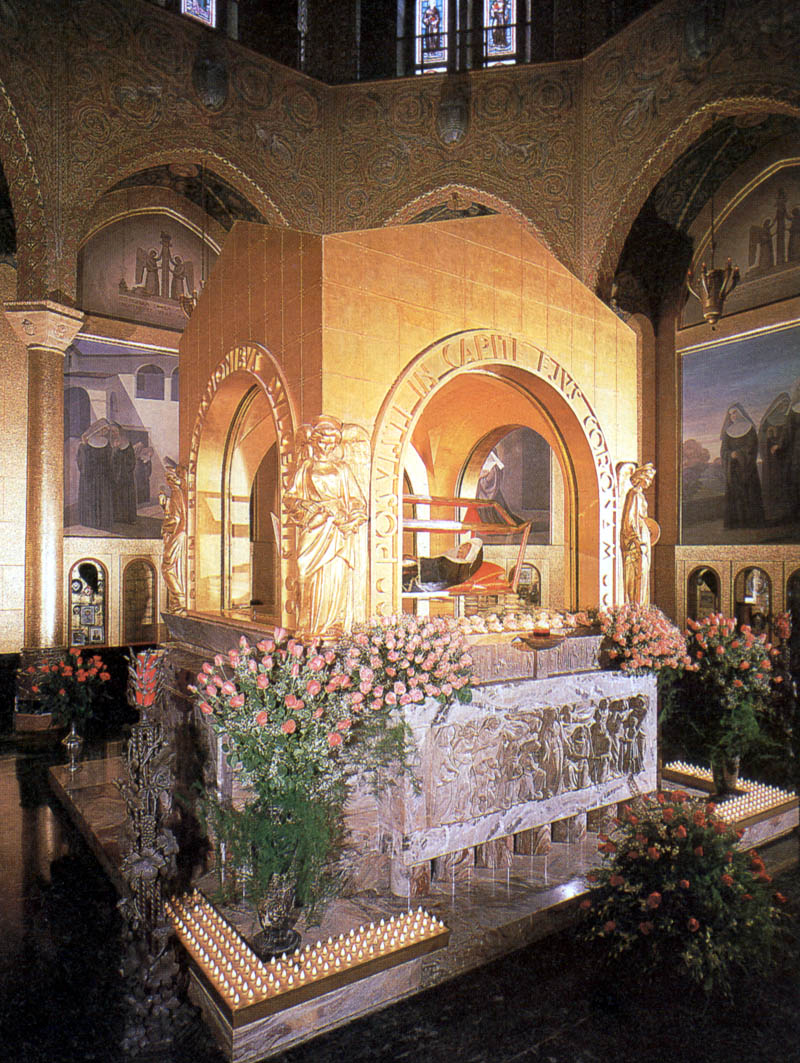
Saint Rita's tomb at the Basilica of Cascia

=== Early cult ===
Augustinian Father Agostino Cavallucci from Foligno wrote the first biography of Rita based on oral tradition. The Vita was published in 1610 by Matteo Florimi in Siena. The work was composed long before her beatification, but the title page nevertheless refers to Rita as already "blessed". Another Acta or life story of the woman was compiled by the Augustinian priest Jacob Carelicci.

Rita was also mentioned in a 1641 French volume on important Augustinians by Simplicien Saint-Martin.

=== Sainthood ===
Rita was beatified by Pope Urban VIII in 1626. The pope's private secretary, Fausto Poli, had been born some 15 km (9 miles) from her birthplace and much of the impetus behind her cult is due to his enthusiasm.

She was canonized on 24 May 1900 by Pope Leo XIII. Her feast day is 22 May. The three required miracles that led to her canonization are: The pleasant scent emanating from her incorruptible body; the cure of smallpox, and the sudden recovery of sight of the young Elizabeth Bergamini, who had been staying for four months in the convent of Cascia, asking for Blessed Rita's intercession; and finally, the complete and sudden healing of Cosma Pellegrini in 1887, suffering from chronic catarrhal gastroenteritis and an incurable hemorrhoidal affliction, after having received a vision of the Blessed Rita on his deathbed.

On the 100th anniversary of her canonization in 2000, Pope John Paul II noted her remarkable qualities as a Christian woman: "Rita interpreted well the 'feminine genius' by living it intensely in both physical and spiritual motherhood."

=== Patronage ===
Rita has acquired the reputation, together with St. Philomena and St. Jude, as a saint of impossible causes. She is also the patron saint of sterility, abuse victims, loneliness, couple and marriage difficulties, parenthood, widows, the sick, bodily ills, and wounds.

In the 20th century, a large sanctuary was built for Rita in Cascia. The sanctuary and the house where Rita was born are among the most active pilgrimage sites of Umbria. Augustinians kept Rita's incorrupt body over the centuries, and it is venerated today in the shrine at Cascia. Part of her face has been slightly repaired with wax. Many people visit her tomb each year from all over the world.

The National Shrine of Saint Rita of Cascia in Philadelphia, Pennsylvania, was built in 1907 and is a popular pilgrimage and devotional site.

A church dedicated to St. Rita Church is located in Nanthirickal, Kollam district, in the state of Kerala, India. It is the only church in Asia to have relics of Saint Rita.

== Iconography ==
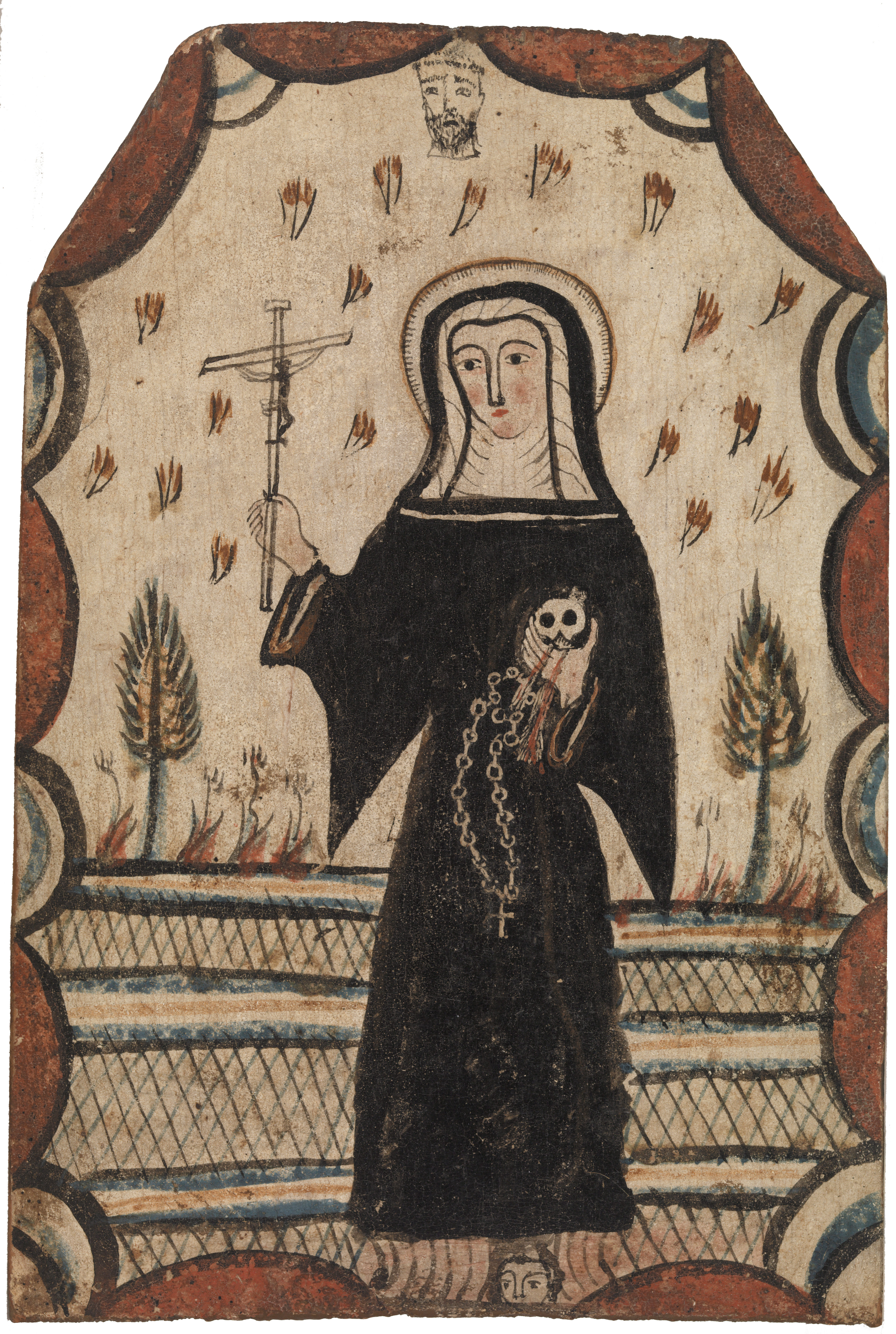
Pedro Antonio Fresquis (circa 1800) - Saint Rita of Cascia

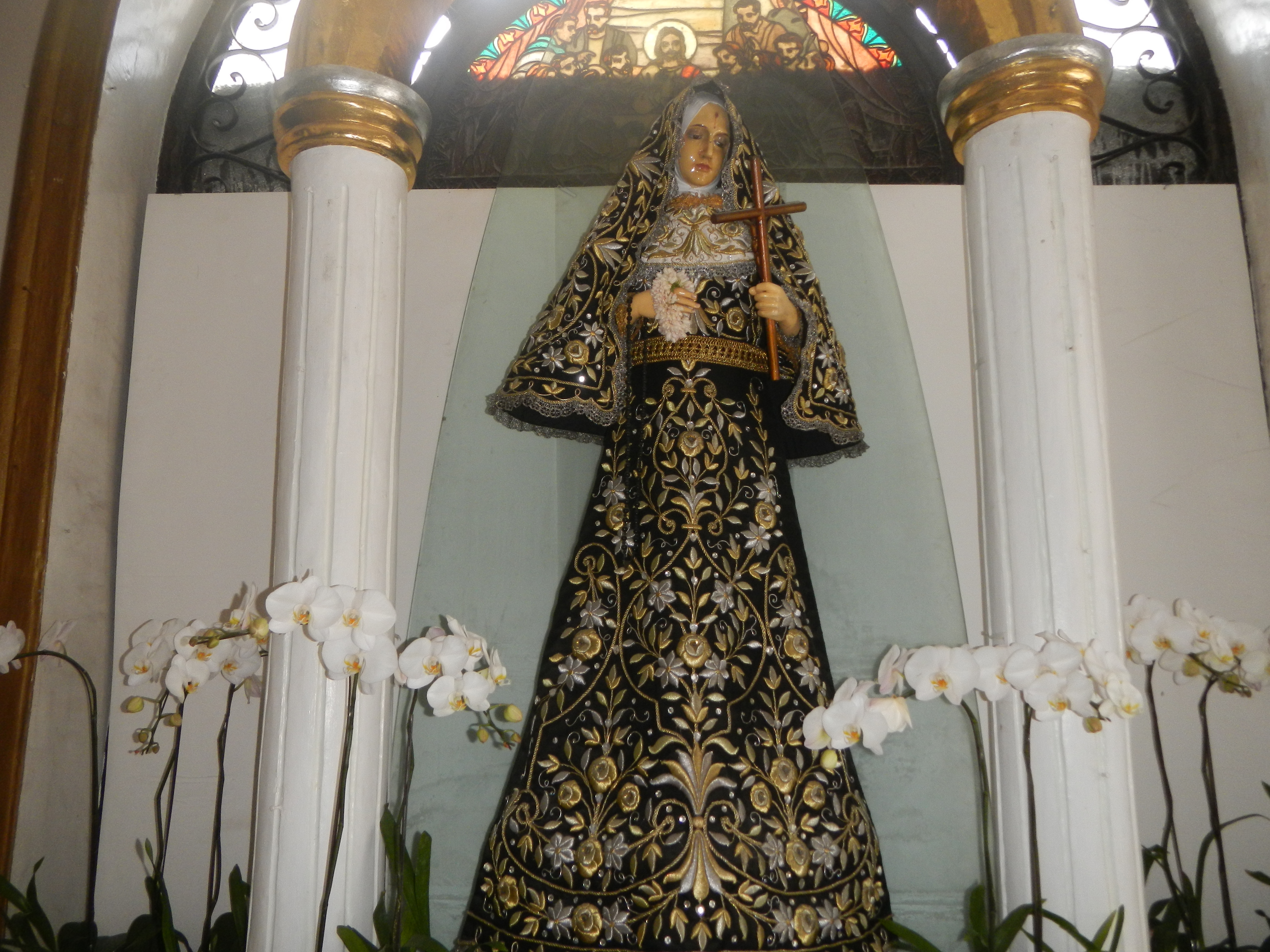
Santa Rita de Cascia Parish Church, Philam Homes, Quezon City

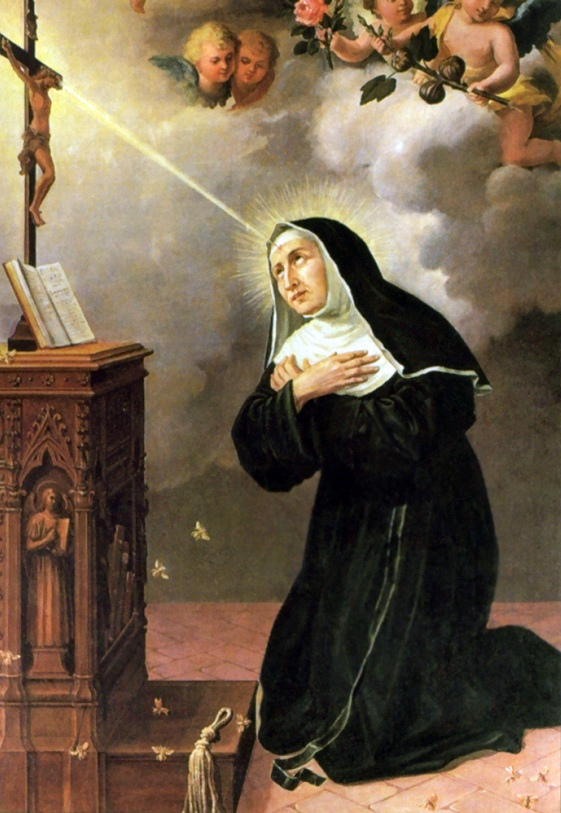
A popular religious depiction of Saint Rita during her partial stigmata. (The black Augustinian habit is historically inaccurate; she would have worn the brown robes and white veil of the Monastery of Saint Mary Magdalene from the 13th century.)

Various religious symbols are related to Rita. She is depicted holding a thorn (a symbol of her penance and stigmata) or crown of thorns, holding a large Crucifix, often with roses. She may also have a forehead wound.

=== The forehead wound ===
When Rita was about 60 years of age, she was meditating before an image of Christ crucified. Suddenly, a small wound appeared on her forehead, as though a thorn from the crown that encircled Christ's head had loosened itself and penetrated her own flesh. It was considered to be a partial stigma, and she bore this external sign of union with Christ until her death in 1457.

At the time of her death, the sisters of the convent bathed and dressed her body for burial. They noticed that her forehead wound remained the same, with drops of blood still reflecting light. When her body was later exhumed, her forehead wound was found to still remain the same, with the glistening light reflected from the drops of blood. Her body showed no signs of deterioration. Over several years, her body was exhumed two more times. Each time, her body appeared the same. She was declared an incorruptible after the third exhumation. Relics were taken at that time as is the custom in the Catholic Church in preparation for sainthood.

=== Roses ===
Near the end of her life, Rita was said to be bedridden at the convent. While visiting her, a cousin visiting from Roccaporena asked if she desired anything from her old home. Rita responded by asking for a rose from the garden. It was January, and her cousin did not expect to find one due to the season, but when her relative went to the house, a single blooming rose was found in the garden, and her cousin brought it back to Rita at the convent.

St. Rita is often depicted holding roses or with roses nearby. On her feast day, churches and shrines of St. Rita provide roses to the congregation that are blessed by the priest during mass.

=== The Bees ===
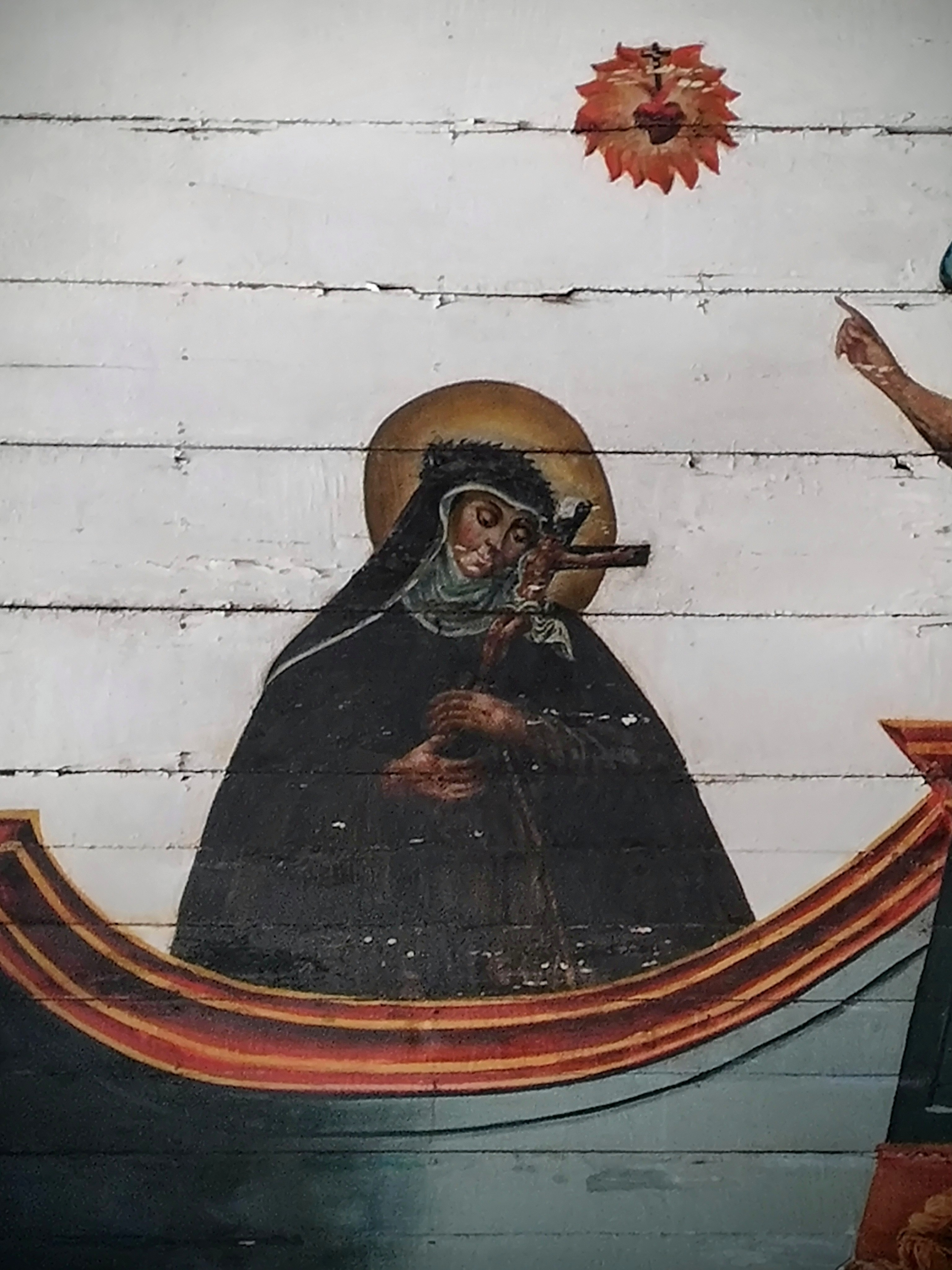
Saint Rita of Cassia portrayed in the Cathedral of São João del Rey, Brazil

In the parish church of Laarne, near Ghent, Belgium, a statue of Rita has several bee featured. This depiction originates from the story of her baptism as an infant. On the day after her baptism, her family noticed a swarm of white bees flying around her as she slept in her crib.The bees peacefully entered and exited her mouth, though, without causing her any harm or injury. Instead of being alarmed for her safety, her family was mystified by this sight. According to Butler, this was taken to indicate that the career of the child was to be marked by industry, virtue, and devotion.

== In Art ==
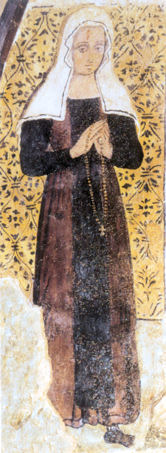
fresco of St. Rita of Cascia, Italian School (possibly 15th c.)

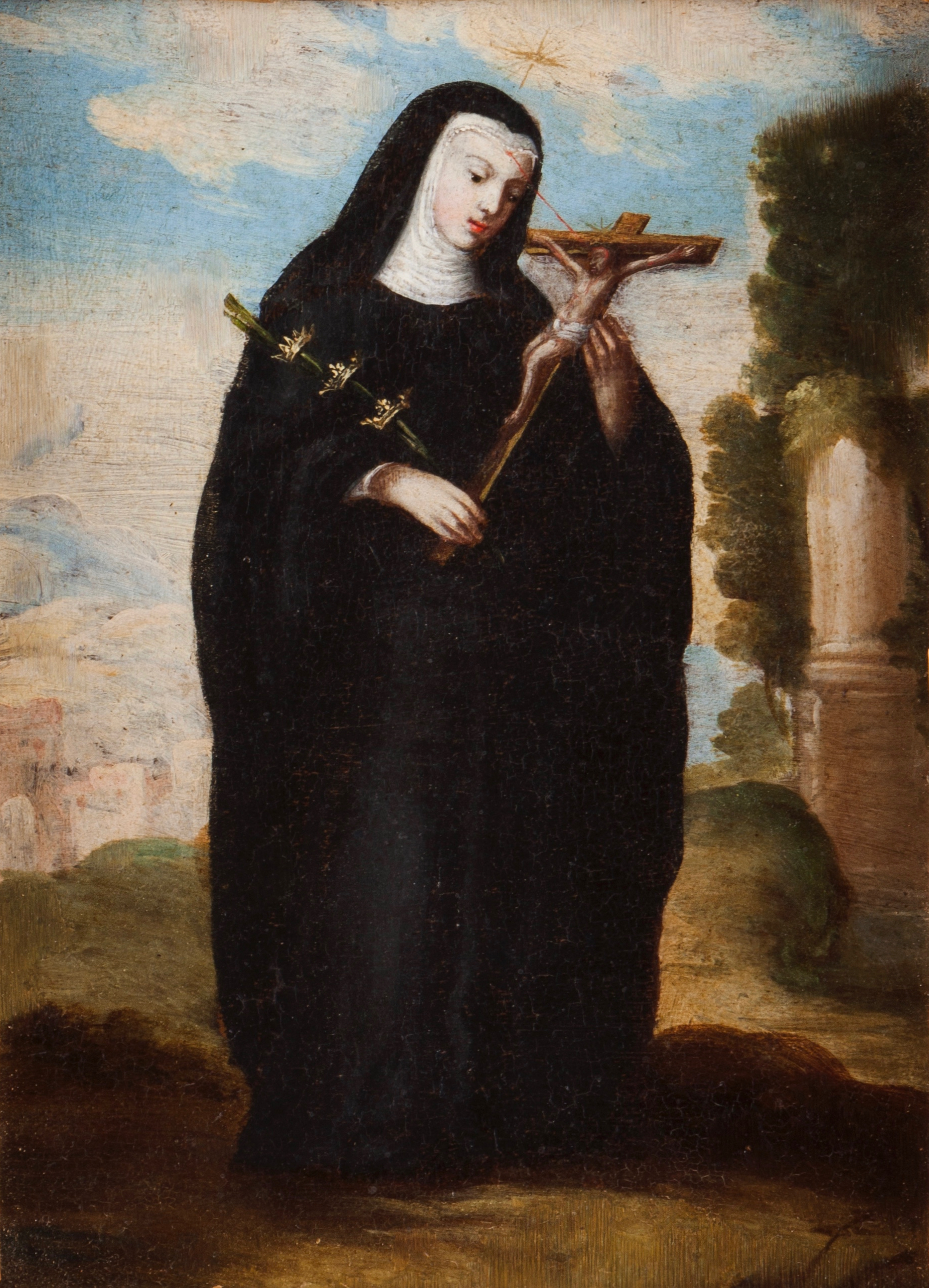
Saint Rita of Cascia, Portuguese school (16th c.)

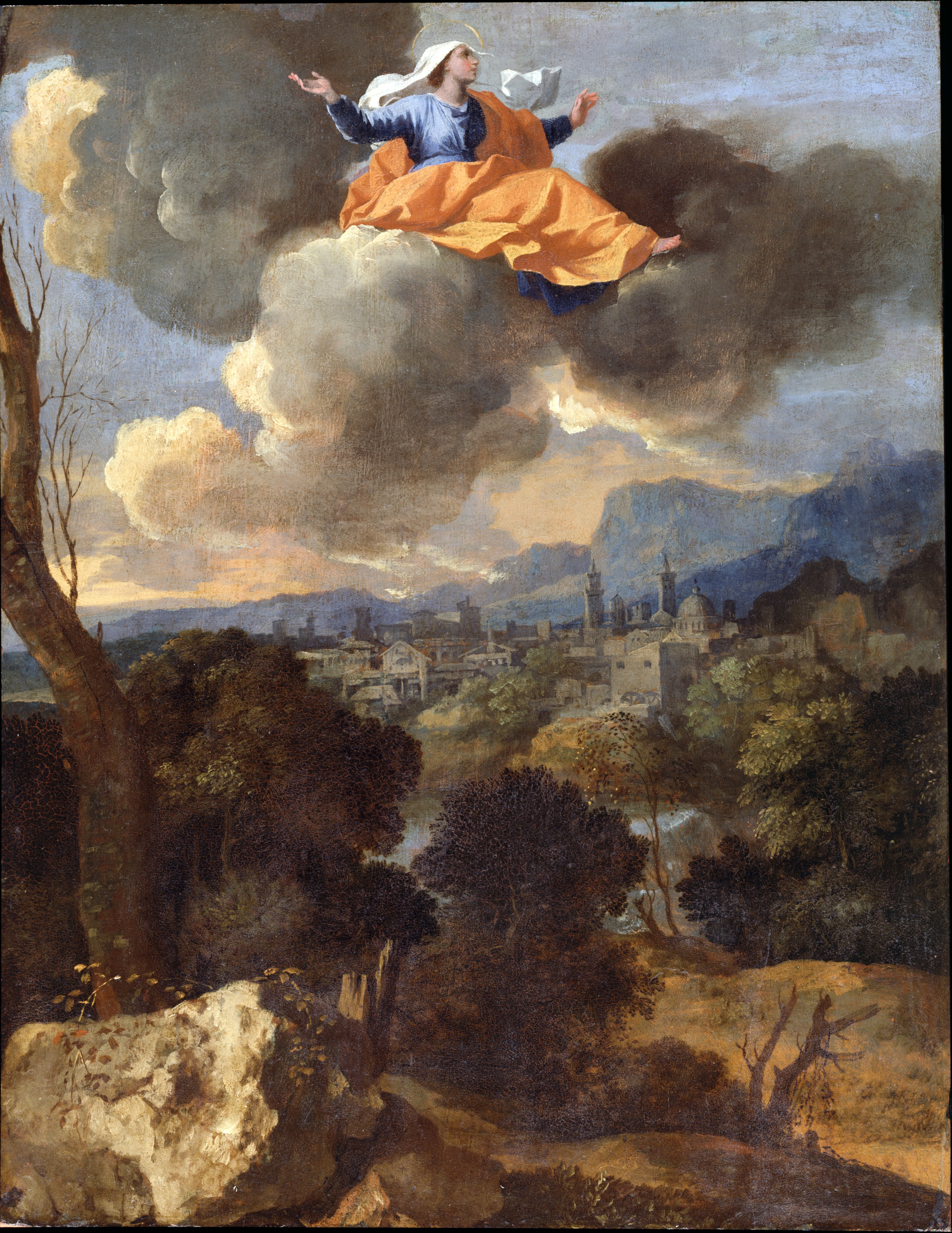
Nicolas Poussin, The Translation of Saint Rita of Cascia (1630s)

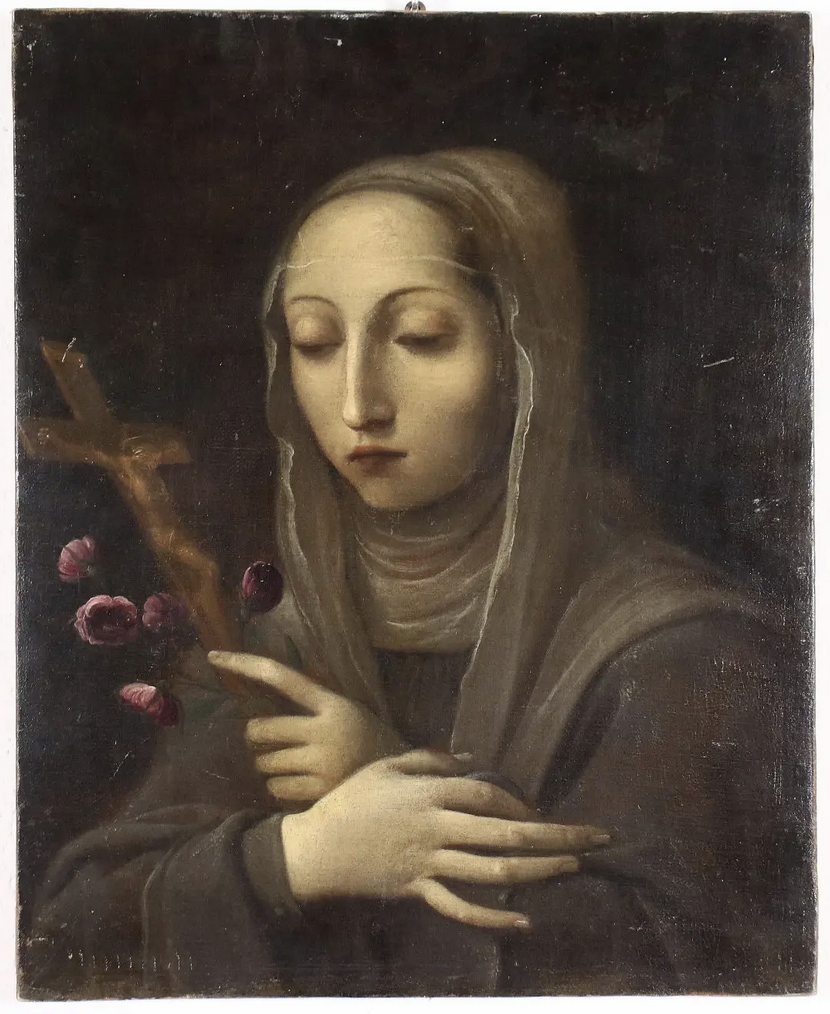
Santa Rita da Cascia, Italian School (17th c.)

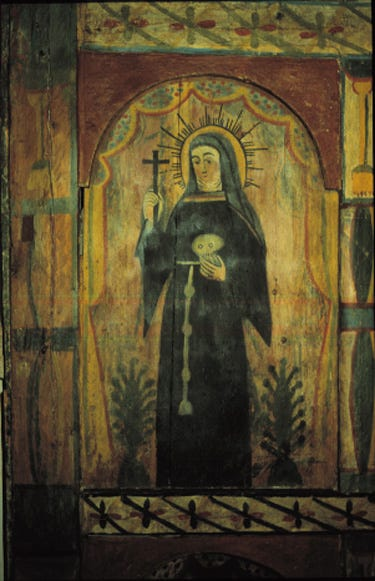
Saint Rita, altar screen, New Mexico (18th c.)

== In popular culture ==
French painter Yves Klein had been dedicated to her as an infant. In 1961, he created an ex voto for the Shrine of St. Rita, which is in Cascia Convent.

French singer Mireille Mathieu adopted Rita as her patron saint on the advice of her paternal grandmother. In her autobiography, Mathieu describes buying a candle for Rita using her last franc. Though Mathieu says that her prayers were not always answered, she testifies that they inspired her to become a strong and determined woman.

In 1943, Rita of Cascia, a film based on Rita's life, was made, starring Elena Zareschi. The story of Rita increased in popularity due to a 2004 film titled Santa Rita da Cascia, filmed in Florence, Italy. The latter film altered the facts of Rita's early life.

Rita is often credited as also being the unofficial patron saint of baseball due to a reference made to her in the 2002 film The Rookie.

The 2019 science-fiction novella Sisters of the Vast Black features a fictional group of nuns known as the Order of Saint Rita.

The 2025 horror film Undertone features images of the statue of St. Rita of Cascia from the Church of Our Lady of Divine Providence on Siquijor island, in the Philippines. The director cites the statue's local folklore as an influence and inspiration for the film.

== See also ==
- List of saints canonized by Pope Leo XIII
- Saint Rita of Cascia, patron saint archive
