= Santa Maria del Soccorso all'Arenella =

Church building in Naples, Italy

Coordinates: 40.853400°N 14.231545°E

Santa Maria del Soccorso all’Arenella is a parish church, located in the Piazzetta Arenella in the Rione of Arenella of Naples, Italy. Tradition holds that this church was the parish church for Salvatore Rosa in Naples.

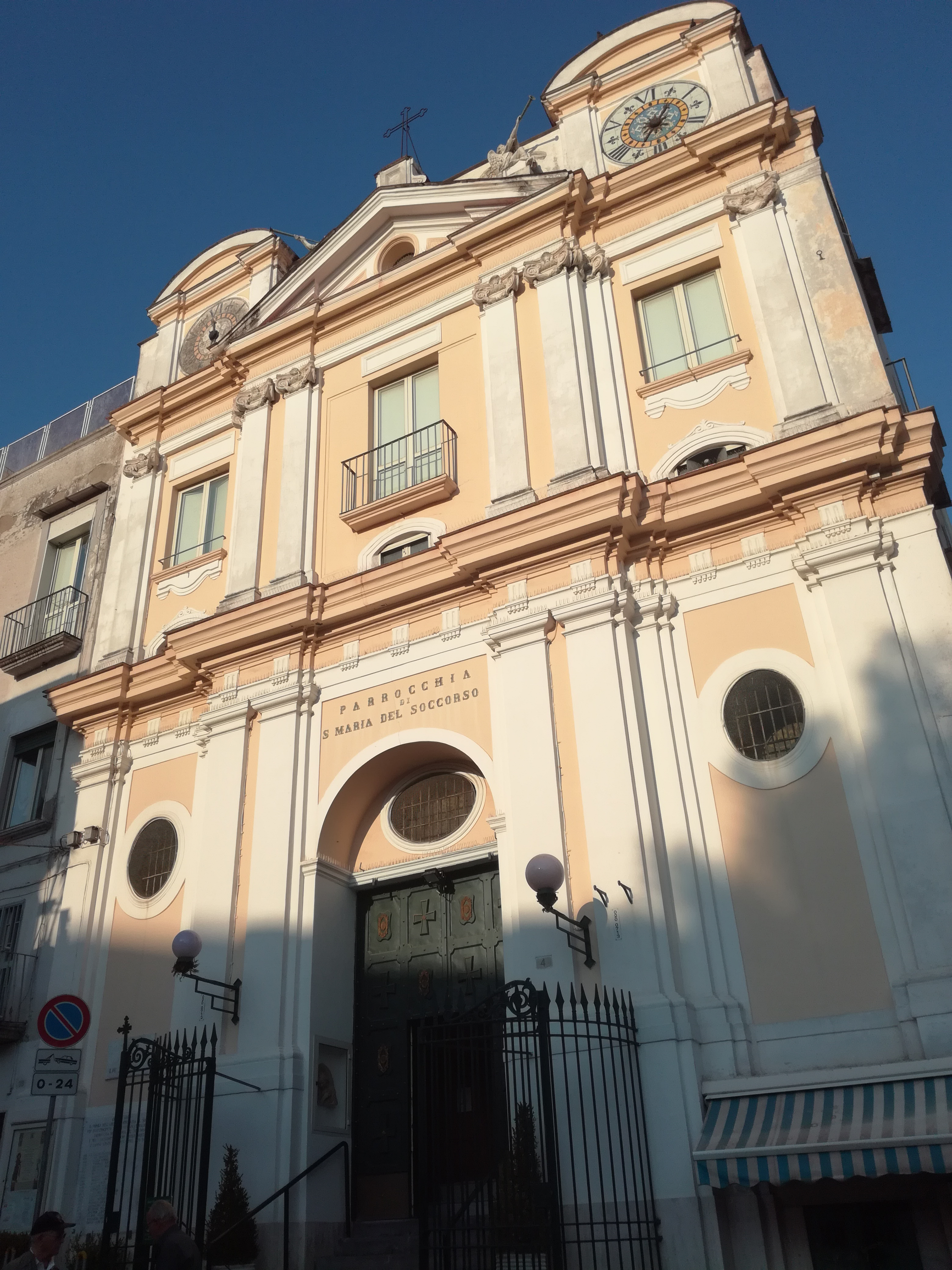
Façade of church.

== History ==
While founded in 1607, the church has undergone numerous reconstructions. The façade was rebuilt in the 1700s; the counter façade contains frescoes depicting Saints Monica and Augustine by an unknown 17th-century painter. In the 1960s much of the interior was rebuilt. The baptismal font has an 18th-century canvas of Tobias and the Angel by Salvatore Mollo. The main church has some wooden polychrome sculptures, and other paintings depicting the Flight from Egypt, Marriage of the Virgin, and a Crucifixion. The chapel on the left has a canvas of the Madonna and souls of Purgatory by Raffaele Spano.

There is a second church dedicated to Santa Maria del Soccorso, titled Santa Maria del Soccorso a Capodimonte.
