= Santa Maria del Soccorso a Capodimonte =

Church of Santa Maria del Soccorso a Capodimonte
- Chiesa di Santa Maria del Soccorso a Capodimonte
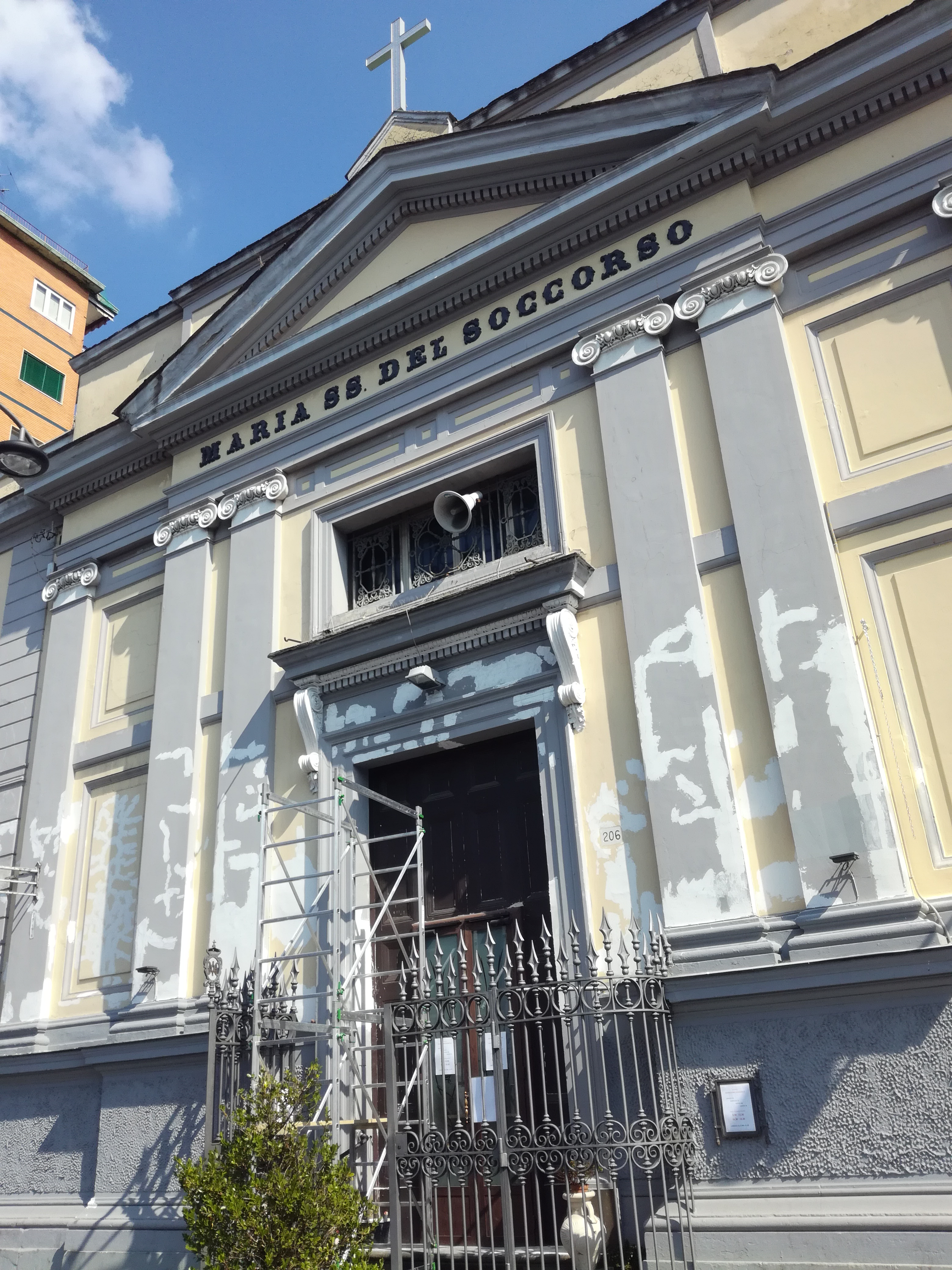
- The façade of church.
- Church of Santa Maria del Soccorso a Capodimonte
- 40.8615°N 14.2486°E
- Location: Naples; Province of Naples, Campania
- Country: Italy
- Denomination: Roman Catholic

History
- Status: Active

Architecture
- Architectural type: Church
- Style: Neoclassical architecture

Administration
- Diocese: Roman Catholic Archdiocese of Naples

Santa Maria del Soccorso a Capodimonte is a Neoclassic-style Roman Catholic church in the Capodimonte Neighborhood of Naples, Italy.

The interior is centralized and has a cupola frescos with a starry sky. On the lateral apse are frescos depicting the Death of St Joseph and the Agony of Christ in the Garden of Gesthemane. In the apse ceiling is a fresco of the Trinity by Vincenzo Galloppi. The main altarpiece depicting the Virgin of Succor (1879) was painted by Giuseppe Mancinelli. There is a second church dedicated to Santa Maria del Soccorso, called Maria del Soccorso all’Arenalle.
