= Santa Maria del Soccorso, Petriolo =

Roman Catholic church in Marche, Italy

Coordinates: 43°13′15″N 13°27′52″E

Santa Maria del Soccorso is a Roman Catholic church located in Via della Croce #8 the historic center of the town of Petriolo, province of Macerata, region of Marche, Italy.

== History ==
The church with a decorative brick façade was originally called Santa Maria e San Basso, because it encompassed two earlier churches. The church was rebuilt between the 13th and 18th centuries. It houses a 15th-century fresco of an Enthroned Madonna and Child attributed to Lorenzo d’Alessandro. A 17th-century canvas depicting a Madonna del Suffragio was painted for the church of that name.
