= Santa Maria del Soccorso, Villa Jovis =

Church building in Capri, Italy

Coordinates: 40°33′31.21″N 14°15′45.42″E

Santa Maria del Soccorso is a church located within the archaeological site of Villa Jovis, on the island of Capri, Italy. It is situated on the summit of the Lo Capo Hill (also known as Santa Maria del Soccorso) at the eastern extremity of the island. The chapel-like church was constructed ca. 1610. Its fittings include a bronze statue of the Madonna, a 1979 gift of the Caprese painter Guido Odierna (1913–1991). In the late 19th century, a hermit lived at the church, keeping a visitor's book and selling wine.
