= Locus Award for Best Young Adult Book =

Literary award by Locus magazine

Winners of the Locus Award for Best Young Adult Book, awarded by the Locus magazine. Awards presented in a given year are for works published in the previous calendar year.

The award for Best Young Adult Book was first presented in 2003 and is among the awards still presented.

== Winners ==
Award winners
Year	Novel	Author	Ref.
2003	Coraline	Neil Gaiman	
2004	The Wee Free Men	Terry Pratchett	
2005	A Hat Full of Sky	Terry Pratchett	
2006	Pay the Piper: A Rock 'N' Roll Fairy Tale	Jane Yolen and Adam Stemple	
2007	Wintersmith	Terry Pratchett	
2008	Un Lun Dun	China Miéville	
2009	The Graveyard Book	Neil Gaiman	
2010	Leviathan	Scott Westerfeld	
2011	Ship Breaker	Paolo Bacigalupi	
2012	The Girl Who Circumnavigated Fairyland in a Ship of Her Own Making	Catherynne M. Valente	
2013	Railsea	China Miéville	
2014	The Girl Who Soared Over Fairyland and Cut the Moon in Two	Catherynne M. Valente	
2015	Half a King	Joe Abercrombie	
2016	The Shepherd's Crown	Terry Pratchett	
2017	Revenger	Alastair Reynolds	
2018	Akata Warrior	Nnedi Okorafor	
2019	Dread Nation	Justina Ireland	
2020	Dragon Pearl	Yoon Ha Lee	
2021	A Wizard's Guide to Defensive Baking	T. Kingfisher	
2022	Victories Greater Than Death	Charlie Jane Anders	
2023	Dreams Bigger Than Heartbreak	Charlie Jane Anders	
2024	Promises Stronger Than Darkness	Charlie Jane Anders	
2025	Moonstorm	Yoon Ha Lee	
2026	Starstrike	Yoon Ha Lee	
