= The Devils (Abercrombie novel) =

2025 novel by Joe Abercrombie

- U.S. first edition cover
- Author: Joe Abercrombie
- Audio read by: Steven Pacey
- Language: English
- Genre: Grimdark
- Publisher: Gollancz
- Publication date: 6 May 2025
- Publication place: London
- Media type: Print (hardcover, paperback), audio, eBook
- Pages: 565
- ISBN: 978-1-3996-0356-0 (First edition hardcover)

The Devils is a 2025 grimdark fantasy novel by Joe Abercrombie. It is his first novel since the completion of the Age of Madness trilogy in 2021, and his first novel outside the First Law universe since 2015. The book follows a monk, cursed knight, pirate, werewolf, vampire, magician, and elf who are tasked by the church to escort a former thief to Troy, where she is heir to the throne. It appeared on the New York Times and Sunday Times bestseller lists. The audiobook, read by Steven Pacey, won an AudioFile Earphones Award. James Cameron purchased rights to a film adaptation.

== Development ==
The idea for The Devils began when English fantasy writer Joe Abercrombie was developing a young adult series. Though he eventually wrote the Shattered Sea series instead, he first thought about a series premised on "a set of monsters employed by the pope". Following the conclusion of the Age of Madness trilogy, he returned to the concept. Published in May 2025, it was the first novel outside the First Law universe since 2015.

== Plot synopsis ==
In an alternate medieval Europe, a monk named Brother Diaz learns from Cardinal Zizka that he will lead the Chapel of the Holy Expediency, a secretive group within the Church. Chapel representatives Jakob and Baptiste take him to its hidden dungeon, where Diaz meets the imprisoned members, referred to as "the devils": the necromancer Balthazar, the elf Sunny, and the vampire Baron Rikard. Separately, Alex, a thief, is rescued in the street by Duke Michael of Nicaea. To everyone's surprise, including her own, he identifies her as Princess Alexia Pyrogennetos, the heir to Troy. The Church binds the members of the Chapel to protect her on her journey to Troy, as she is likely to be attacked by her late aunt Eudoxia's sons.

One of the sons, Duke Marcian, ambushes the group with hybrid human-animal soldiers created by his mother. Jakob is fatally stabbed while trying to unlock their wagon, but Sunny opens it, releasing Vigga, a werewolf and the last member of the Chapel. After killing the soldiers and Marcian, Vigga turns on Alex and Diaz, but a revived Jakob tells her to stop, and she transforms into human form. Duke Michael, hurt from the battle, parts ways with the group. To avoid being followed, the group heads to Venice, joining a group of pilgrims. However, the Bishop among the pilgrims betrays them for a reward from another of Eudoxia's sons, Duke Constans. Baron Rikard uses glamour on the pilgrims while the group escapes. In Venice, they make a deal to gain passage to Troy by retrieving a mysterious box from a cursed house. After opening the box, Jakob, Sunny, and Vigga confront terrifying illusions but are saved by Balthazar, who breaks the spell remotely. They deliver the box and set sail for Troy, but Duke Constans rams their ship. Although Jakob is stabbed by Constans, he kills the Duke before the ship sinks.

The shipwrecked group washes up on shore separated. Balthazar, Baptiste, Rikard, and Jakob find themselves in a local war. After they help resolve the fighting, Balthazar tries to perform a ritual to find Alex but instead calls upon a Duke of Hell to free him from his papal binding, something he has repeatedly attempted and failed during the journey. The demon refuses. Alex and Sunny escape the beach while being chased by Duke Sabbas and his bounty hunters, followed by Vigga and Brother Diaz. The four take refuge in a ruined abbey. Duke Sabbas and his hunters arrive, soon joined by the others. Jakob challenges Sabbas to a duel, allowing Balthazar to raise a horde of undead that pull Sabbas into a pit. Afterward, the group rests in Sabbas's abandoned camp, where a romance begins between Alex and Sunny.

The group reaches Troy, where Duke Michael's contact, Lady Severa, welcomes them and leads them to the Pharos of Troy. They prepare for Alex's coronation but are interrupted by Duke Arcadius, Eudoxia's last son. He proposes marriage instead of fighting. Upset, Alex confesses to Sunny that she was not the princess but a common thief who took on Alexia's identity after her death. After Alex is crowned, Arcadius tells her he wants a political alliance for Troy's safety, and she agrees. However, her new handmaidens, revealed as Eudoxia's former apprentices, kill Arcadius. Alex manages to escape and signals for help from the Pharos.

The devils, who had set sail after fulfilling their obligations, return to help after seeing a signal from their ship. Vigga changes into her wolf form and accidentally kills Baptiste. Balthazar discovers that Lady Severa is Eudoxia, who has transferred her soul to another body. She offers an alliance, but Balthazar chooses to stay loyal to the devils. Rikard kills the handmaidens. Alex tries to escape with Sunny, but Michael stops them and reveals he used Alex to take the throne for himself. Jakob then tackles Michael, and they both fall into the sea. After the attempted coup, Cardinal Zizka visits Troy to meet Empress Alexia and Brother Diaz, who is now her chaplain. Alex asks the Church to free the devils, but Zizka refuses, stating they are too dangerous. The devils are kept on Zizka's ship until the Church needs them again. Meanwhile, in the Holy City, two people are called to replace Diaz and Baptiste.

== Adaptations and sequels ==
The audiobook, released at the same time as the book, is read by Steven Pacey, who read Abercrombie's First Law books and won an AudioFile Earphones Award for the work.

James Cameron purchased rights to a film adaptation, announcing to begin work upon completion of the third Avatar film. Cameron plans to co-write the adaptation with Abercrombie, contrasting his intent to work on it "for fun" with the seriousness of some of Cameron's past work.

The second book in the series, The Heretics, has a publication date of May 2027.
