= EUZ =

EUZ may refer to:

== EUZ ==
- Eastern Upwelling Zone, a zone in the Southern Caribbean upwelling system
- EUZ, used in naming several boats at the Platu 25 World Championship
- EUZ, an ICAO code for Euroair Transport, a defunct airline

== Euz ==
- Euz, a half-demon character in The First Law fantasy series
