= Victories Greater Than Death =

2021 novel by Charlie Jane Anders

- Author: Charlie Jane Anders
- Audio read by: Hynden Walch
- Language: English
- Series: Unstoppable #1
- Genre: Young adult, space opera
- Publisher: Tor Teen
- Publication date: April 13, 2021
- Publication place: United States
- Pages: 288
- ISBN: 9781250317315
- Followed by: Dreams Bigger Than Heartbreak

Victories Greater Than Death is a 2021 young adult science fiction novel, the first installment in the Unstoppable trilogy by Charlie Jane Anders. The novel focuses on Tina Mains, a teenage girl who is secretly a clone of an alien war hero who is called up for service in galactic war after the beacon implanted in her activates.

The book was published on April 13, 2021, by Tor Teen, an imprint of Tor Books. It received positive reviews from critics and won the Locus Award for Best Young Adult Book. It has been noted for its themes of diversity and inclusion.

== Development and publication ==
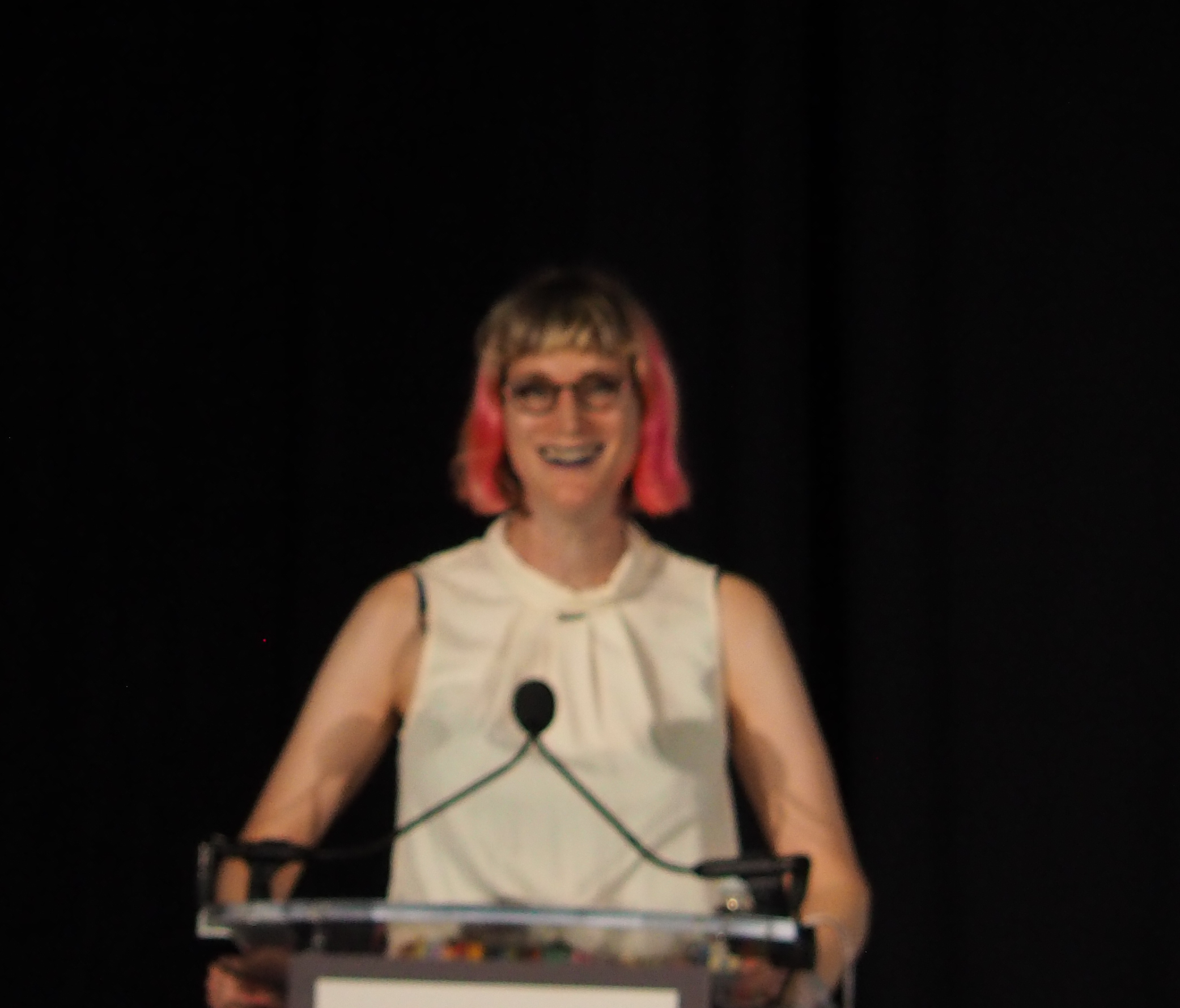
Author Charlie Jane Anders at Worldcon 75 in 2017

The book is Charlie Jane Anders' first work of young adult fiction. It is the first installment in the Unstoppable trilogy, followed by Dreams Bigger Than Heartbreak (2022). Anders was inspired to write in the young adult genre because she felt it was the best medium to publish a "fun" series with fantastical elements comparable to franchises such as Doctor Who or Star Wars, which she grew up enjoying.

Anders wrote the novel as a partly escapist fantasy, based on the trope of a child or teenager who leaves their mundane life to go on adventures. Her interest in this was partly based on her childhood fantasies. However, she chose to avoid the trope of neglectful or abusive parents in young adult fiction, and wrote a loving relationship between the protagonist and her mother.

The book was published on April 13, 2021, by Tor Teen, an imprint of Tor Books. An audiobook, narrated by Hynden Walch, was also released.

== Synopsis ==
Tina Mains appears to be a seventeen-year-old girl but is actually a clone of the decorated veteran Captain Thaoh Argentian, an alien commander. She leads a normal life on Earth while eagerly awaiting the day that she is called up for military service. After the beacon inside Tina's chest activates, she and her friend Rachael are taken aboard the HMSS Indomitable where they join the war against The Compassion, a genocidal alien military.

The fleet attempts to restore Tina's memories of her life as Captain Argentian, but she is only able to access the raw information and has none of Argentian's emotions. Tina, along with a crew of various human and alien prodigies, work together to defeat The Compassion.

== Themes ==
Central themes of the novel are friendship and love, as well as anti-imperialism.

Themes of identity are explored through both Tina Mains' experience as an alien clone as well as the diverse cast of side characters. The aliens within the Royal Fleet include a wide array of physical and social variations, and the human characters are also racially diverse. The concept of individuality is built into the institution of the Royal Fleet, which Anders intended as a contrast to more conformist military organizations in franchises like Star Trek. Rather than being based on the human military tradition, the fleet's structure is built around the cultural differences of its member species.

Preferred gender pronouns and neopronouns are a prominent part of the narrative, as characters must introduce themselves with their pronouns due to the in-universe demands of interspecies communication. Anders stated that since aliens in her universe have different gender identities, reproductive anatomies and family structures, their gender might not be apparent to other species such as humans. She said that "When you meet an alien, you're not going to be able to tell what gender, if any, they might have." Affirmative consent is also incorporated into the dialogue of the novel. Critics noted the inclusiveness of the narrative, which Maya Gittelman of Tor.com wrote "reads as a very genuine celebration of difference."

== Reception ==
The book has been described by critics as a space opera, within an expansive universe. It received praise for its lighthearted tone, action and fast pacing. Gary K. Wolfe wrote that it "cheerfully echoes not only familiar pop-culture properties from The Last Starfighter to the Marvel Cinematic Universe, but reaches all the way back to Heinlein juveniles and 1930s space operas."

It was compared by some reviewers to franchises like Steven Universe. Ellie King of Nerd Daily felt that it was written in a somewhat "simplified" way that would make it accessible to younger readers, but might alienate older audiences. Michael Berry of Common Sense Media gave the book a score of 5 out of 5.

Year	Award	Category	Result	Ref.
2021	Andre Norton Award	—	Finalist	
2022	Locus Award	Young Adult Book	Won	
2022	Lodestar Award	—	Finalist	

== Adaptation ==
In September 2021, it was announced that Amazon Studios was developing a television series based on the book, through Outlier Society. Michael B. Jordan is the executive producer along with writer and showrunner Gennifer Hutchison.
