= Choir Boy (novel) =

2005 novel by Charlie Jane Anders

- Author: Charlie Jane Anders
- Language: English
- Genre: Fiction
- Published: April 5, 2005
- Publisher: Soft Skull Press
- Publication place: United States
- Pages: 320 pp

Choir Boy is a 2005 novel by Charlie Jane Anders.

== Plot ==
Berry, a 12-year-old boy, wants nothing more than to remain a choirboy. Desperate to keep his voice from changing, Berry tries to injure himself, and then convinces a clinic to give him testosterone-inhibiting drugs that keep his voice from deepening but also cause him to grow breasts. Suddenly Berry's thrown into a world of unexpected gender issues that push him into a universe far more complex than anything he's ever known.

== Reception ==
Choir Boy won the 2005 Lambda Literary Award for Transgender Literature.

Tikkun described it as "engaging", noting its "believable, frustrating quality", and lauded Anders for "handl[ing] issues of gender (and religion, race, and class) with a light touch."

Kirkus Reviews called it "groundbreaking and unflinching", with Berry's story being "memorable", but overall faulted it for a "lack of a cohesive voice and too much figurative language", with "[a]trocious metaphors, sloppy editing and too many pithy observations [that] detract from the prose."
