= Promises Stronger Than Darkness =

2023 science fiction novel

- Author: Charlie Jane Anders
- Language: English
- Series: Unstoppable #3
- Genre: Young adult, space opera
- Publisher: Tor Teen
- Publication date: April 11, 2023
- Publication place: United States
- Preceded by: Dreams Bigger Than Heartbreak

Promises Stronger Than Darkness is a 2023 science fiction novel, the final installment in the Unstoppable trilogy by Charlie Jane Anders.

== Synopsis ==
The book picks up after the end of Dreams Bigger Than Heartbreak, where Tina Mains' body has been taken over by galactic war hero Thaoh Argentian, who she was cloned from. Rachel and Elz struggle to adjust to the loss of Tina as the Bereavement threatens to destroy the galaxy.

== Publication ==
The book was published by Tor Teen on April 11, 2023. It is the third instalment in the Unstoppable trilogy.

== Reception and awards ==
Kirkus Reviews wrote that the book "showcases Anders’ layered worldbuilding and emphasis on interpersonal relationships. As before, characters diverse across multiple dimensions, including ethnicity and sexuality, are highlighted." Nerds & Beyond also praised the book as a conclusion to the trilogy, writing that it was "just as rich and imaginative [as earlier instalments], with a magnetic universe filled with wonder."

Year	Award	Category	Result	Ref.
2024	Locus Award	Young Adult Book	Won	
2024	Lodestar Award	—	Finalist	
