= Don't Press Charges and I Won't Sue =

Short story by Charlie Jane Anders

- Short story by Charlie Jane Anders
- Country: United States
- Language: English
- Genre: Science fiction short story

Publication
- Published in: Boston Review
- Publication date: October 30, 2017

"Don't Press Charges and I Won't Sue" is a science fiction story by Charlie Jane Anders. It was first published in Boston Review, in their 2017 Global Dystopias anthology.

== Synopsis ==
Rachel is a trans woman who is drugged and kidnapped by an organization called Love and Dignity for Everyone that forces detransition by means of brain transplants, transferring her mind onto the cadaver of a male. Whenever she tries to speak, the cadaver speaks instead, twisting her screams and cries for help into grunts and docile appeals. During the process, she discovers that the person supervising her torture is her childhood friend Jeffrey. Several flashbacks provide background details about their lives and their relationship, including Rachel's engagement with Sherri, a woman Jeffrey had tried but failed to court.

Rachel pointedly stares at Jeffrey, who tries but fails to avoid her gaze. He asks the organization's president, Mr. Randall, for recusal, but Mr. Randall persuades him to continue with the procedure. Rachel makes the cadaver call out for Jeffrey. After she makes the cadaver scream Sherri's name, Jeffrey, in a breach of protocol, barges into the room and tries to quiet her. Rachel manages to headbutt Jeffrey and grab his utility knife, using it to stab Jeffrey and free herself. She escapes the facility and flees into the surrounding wilderness, all while the cadaver pursues her. She attempts to slow it down, but it shrugs off any obstacles in the way. As the cadaver gets closer and closer, she wades into a roaring stream, stops at a waterfall downstream, and jumps.

== Reception and awards ==
Gardner Dozois compared it to Kafka's The Castle. Publishers Weekly considered it "astoundingly good".

In 2020, Anders stated that she has only read the story aloud once, as she finds it too traumatizing; as well, she reported that "other trans people have told [her] that they had to lie down after reading it."

Year	Award	Category	Result	Ref.
2017	James Tiptree Jr. Award	—	Honor List	
2018	Locus Award	Short Story	Finalist	
2018	Theodore Sturgeon Award	—	Won	

== Origin ==
Anders has described the story's genesis as her own anxieties over the then-pending inauguration of Donald Trump.
