= Joe Abercrombie =

English fantasy writer and film editor (born 1974)

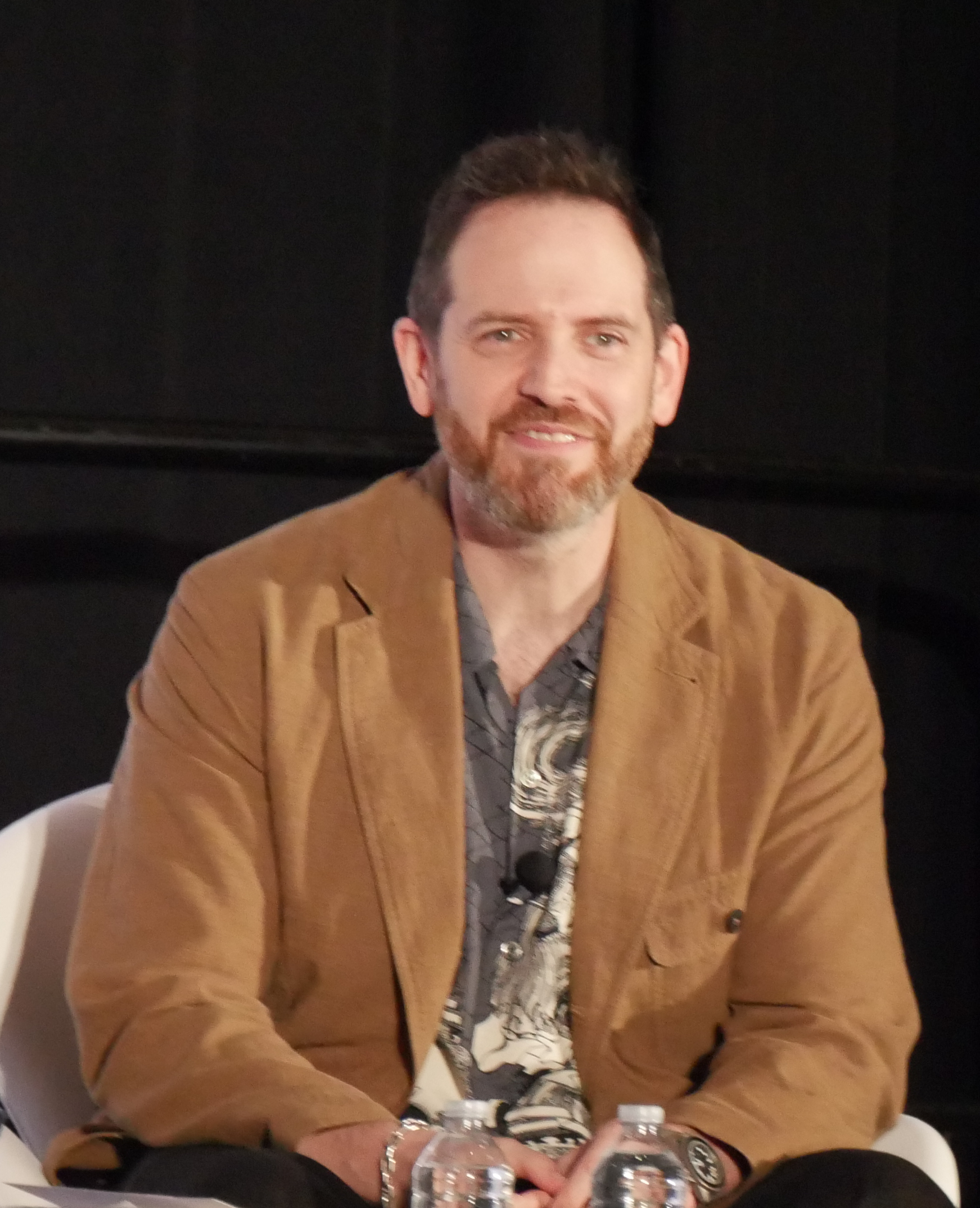
- Abercrombie in 2025
- Born: Joseph Edward Abercrombie; 31 December 1974 (age 51); Lancaster, Lancashire, England
- Education: Lancaster Royal Grammar School; University of Manchester
- Occupation: Author
- Writing career
- Period: 2004–present
- Genre: Fantasy
- Notable works: The First Law; Shattered Sea; The Age of Madness
- Website: joeabercrombie.com

Joseph Edward Abercrombie (born 31 December 1974) is an English author of epic fantasy books and a film editor. He is the author of The First Law and The Age of Madness trilogies, as well as other fantasy books in the same setting, and a trilogy of young adult novels. His novel Half a King won the 2015 Locus Award for best young adult book.

== Life and education ==
Abercrombie was born in Lancaster, Lancashire, England. He was educated at Lancaster Royal Grammar School and Manchester University, where he studied psychology. He has a wife, Lou.

Abercrombie has been an avid player of video games since his childhood. In an interview with Edge magazine, Abercrombie stated that video games have been a big influence on his writing, including early interest in text-based adventure games and historically based strategy games such as Civilization and Age of Empires. Other favourite games of Abercrombie's include Elite, Dungeon Master, Street Fighter II, and Red Dead Redemption.

== Career ==
Abercrombie had a job making tea at a television production company before taking up a career as a freelance film editor. As a freelance film editor, Abercrombie found himself with more free time than previously. With this time, he reconsidered a story plot he conceived while attending university.

Abercrombie began writing The Blade Itself in 2002, completing it in 2004. After a year of rejections by publishing agencies, Gillian Redfearn of Gollancz accepted the book for a five-figure deal in 2005. It was published by Gollancz in 2006 and was followed in the succeeding two years by two more books in the trilogy called Before They Are Hanged and Last Argument of Kings. In 2008, Abercrombie was a finalist for the John W. Campbell award for Best New Writer. That same year Abercrombie was a contributor to the BBC Worlds of Fantasy series, alongside other contributors such as Michael Moorcock, Terry Pratchett and China Miéville.

In 2009, Abercrombie released the novel Best Served Cold. It is set in the same world as The First Law trilogy but is a stand-alone novel. He followed with The Heroes (2011) and Red Country (2012), both again set in the world of the First Law Trilogy. The three standalone novels were later collected into an omnibus edition under the name The Great Leveller.

In 2011, Abercrombie signed a deal with Gollancz for four more books set in the First Law world. In 2013, HarperCollins' fantasy and children's imprints acquired the rights to three books by Abercrombie, aimed at younger readers. The three standalone but interconnected novels were released as the Viking-influenced Shattered Sea trilogy.

In April 2022, Tor announced that it had acquired a new trilogy from Abercrombie at auction. The first book in the new series, The Devils, was released in May 2025. In June 2025, it was announced that James Cameron's production company acquired the rights to The Devils, and that Cameron and Abercrombie would write a script together after Cameron completed work on Avatar: Fire and Ash. The second book in the series, The Heretics, is slated for release in May 2027.

Abercrombie has contributed to the Netflix animated anthology series Love, Death & Robots. He wrote the third season episode "Mason's Rats" from the third season, a whimsical tale about a war between a farmer and a group of intelligent rats that live in his barn. In season four he wrote the screenplays for two episodes: "Spider Rose", based on a story by Bruce Sterling, and "Golgotha", adapted from a story by Dave Hutchinson.

== Bibliography ==
=== The First Law series ===
Series	Book	Date
The First Law trilogy	The Blade Itself	May 2006
The First Law trilogy	Before They Are Hanged	March 2007
The First Law trilogy	Last Argument of Kings	March 2008
Standalone novels (The Great Leveller trilogy)	Best Served Cold	June 2009
Standalone novels (The Great Leveller trilogy)	The Heroes	January 2011
Standalone novels (The Great Leveller trilogy)	Red Country	October 2012
Age of Madness trilogy	A Little Hatred	September 2019
Age of Madness trilogy	The Trouble With Peace	September 2020
Age of Madness trilogy	The Wisdom of Crowds	September 2021
Short story collections	Sharp Ends	April 2016
Short story collections	The Great Change (And Other Lies)	September 2023

The Age of Madness trilogy is set in the same fictional world as the First Law books during an industrial revolution.

==== Short fiction ====
Abercrombie's short fiction works were collected in Sharp Ends: Stories from the World of the First Law (April 2016) and The Great Change (And Other Lies) (September 2023).

Story	Published in	Notes
"The Fool Jobs"	Swords & Dark Magic: The New Sword and Sorcery anthology (June 2010) and in Sharp Ends.	Features Curnden Craw and his dozen in events prior to The Heroes.
"Yesterday, Near A Village Called Barden"	As an extra in the Waterstones hardcover version of The Heroes (2012) and in Sharp Ends.	Focuses on Bremer dan Gorst on campaign prior to The Heroes.
"Freedom!"	As an extra in the Waterstones hardcover version of Red Country (2013) and in Sharp Ends.	Focuses on the liberation of the town of Averstock by the Company of the Gracious Hand.
"Skipping Town"	Legends: Stories in Honour of David Gemmell anthology (November 2013) and in Sharp Ends.	Features the couple pairing of Shevedieh (Shev) and Javre, Lioness of Hoskopp.
"Some Desperado"	Dangerous Women anthology (December 2013) and in Sharp Ends.	Features Shy South on the run during her outlaw days before Red Country.
"Tough Times All Over"	Rogues anthology (June 2014) and in Sharp Ends.	Follows courier Carcolf and the circuitous route one of her packages takes through the city of Sipani. It also features Shev and Javre.
"Small Kindnesses"	Unbound: Tales by Masters of Fantasy anthology (December 2015) and in Sharp Ends.	Features Shev.
"Two's Company"	Online on Tor.com (January 2016) and in Sharp Ends.	Features Shev and Javre, a "female Fafhrd and the Gray Mouser style thief and warrior odd couple."
"A Beautiful Bastard"	Original to Sharp Ends.	Features Sand dan Glokta.
"Hell"	Original to Sharp Ends.	Shows the fall of Dagoska through the eyes of a young acolyte.
"Wrong Place, Wrong Time"	Original to Sharp Ends.	Features Monzcarro Murcatto.
"Three's a Crowd"	Original to Sharp Ends.	Features Horald the Finger and Shevedieh.
"Made a Monster"	Original to Sharp Ends.	Features the chieftain Bethod.
"The Thread"	As an extra in the Waterstones hardcover version of A Little Hatred and in The Great Change (And Other Lies).	Follows a thread of fabric from raw material to finished product, and the lives whose hands it passes through.
"The Stone"	As an extra in the Waterstones hardcover version of The Trouble With Peace and in The Great Change (And Other Lies).	Follows a diamond from discovery to finished product, and the lives whose hands it passes through.
"The Point"	As an extra in the Waterstones hardcover version of The Wisdom Of Crowds and in The Great Change (And Other Lies).	Follows an ingot of iron from discovery to finished product, and the lives whose hands it passes through.
"The Great Change"	Original to The Great Change (And Other Lies).	Follows the creation and evolution of the Great Change.

"Tough Times All Over" won a Locus Award, and "The Fool Jobs" and "Some Desperado" received nominations.

=== Shattered Sea trilogy ===
#	Book	Date
1	Half a King	July 2014
2	Half the World	February 2015
3	Half a War	July 2015

=== The Devils ===
#	Book	Date
1	The Devils	May 2025

== Selected awards and honours ==
Awards and nominations
Year (Note: Year of publication.)	Work	Award	Category	Result	Ref.
2006	The Blade Itself	Locus Award	First Novel	Nominated	
2008	Last Argument of Kings	Gemmell Award	Fantasy Novel	Nominated	
2009	Best Served Cold	British Fantasy Award	Novel	Nominated	
2009	Best Served Cold	Gemmell Award	Fantasy Novel	Nominated	
2009	Best Served Cold	The Kitschies	Novel	Nominated	
2010	"The Fool Jobs"	Locus Award	Novelette	Nominated	
2011	The Heroes	British Fantasy Award	Novel	Nominated	
2011	The Heroes	Gemmell Award	Fantasy Novel	Nominated	
2011	The Heroes	Locus Award	Fantasy Novel	Nominated	
2012	Red Country	British Fantasy Award	Fantasy Novel	Nominated	
2012	Red Country	Gemmell Award	Fantasy Novel	Nominated	
2012	Red Country	Locus Award	Fantasy Novel	Nominated	
2013	"Some Desperado"	Locus Award	Short Story	Nominated	
2014	Half a King	Gemmell Award	Fantasy Novel	Nominated	
2014	Half a King	Locus Award	Young Adult Book	Won	
2014	"Tough Times All Over"	Locus Award	Novelette	Won	
2015	Half the World	Locus Award	Young Adult Book	Nominated	
2015	Half a War	British Fantasy Award	Fantasy Novel	Nominated	
2015	Half a War	Locus Award	Young Adult Book	Nominated	
2016	Sharp Ends	British Fantasy Award	Collection	Nominated	
2016	Sharp Ends	Locus Award	Collection	Nominated	
2016	Sharp Ends	World Fantasy Award	Collection	Nominated	
2020	The Trouble With Peace	Locus Award	Fantasy Novel	Nominated	
