= Six Months, Three Days =

2011 novelette by Charlie Jane Anders

- Cover art by Sam Weber
- Author: Charlie Jane Anders
- Cover artist: Sam Weber
- Language: English
- Genre: Science fiction
- Publisher: Tor.com
- Publication date: June 8, 2011
- Publication place: United States
- Media type: E-book
- ISBN: 978-1-4299-4082-5
- Website: reactormag.com/six-months-three-days/

"Six Months, Three Days" is a science fiction novelette by Charlie Jane Anders. It was originally published online on Tor.com and as an ebook in 2011, and was subsequently reprinted in Some of the Best from Tor.com: 2011 Edition and Year's Best SF 17. It won the 2012 Hugo Award for Best Novelette.

In October 2017 Tor.com published "Six Months, Three Days" in Anders' short fiction collection, Six Months, Three Days, Five Others.

== Plot ==
Doug and Judy are both precognitive: Doug can see "the future", and Judy can see "many possible futures". They fall in love, even though they both know that their relationship will last exactly six months and three days and end very badly.

== Background ==
Anders said in a 2016 interview that in this novelette "[t]he big challenge for me ... was how to have a satisfying resolution" to the which-future-is-right question: "they can’t both be right, but they kind of both are right, and how does that work?" In another 2016 interview, Anders commented that her decision to make her 2016 novel, All the Birds in the Sky, a "relationship story" was influenced by the relationship that she had created in "Six Months, Three Days".

== Release history ==
Originally published online on Tor.com (now Reactor) and in ebook format through Macmillan on June 8, 2011, "Six Months, Three Days" has been collected into various books. A limited-edition 300-copy print was released by Tachyon a few years later. Tor.com republished "Six Months, Three Days" in Anders' short fiction collection, Six Months, Three Days, Five Others in 2017.

It later reprinted in anthologies such as Some of the Best from Tor.com: 2011 Edition and Year's Best SF 17.

== Reception ==
Rachel Swirsky described the story as a "philosophical contrast" between determinism and free will. Jim C. Hines said Anders' resolution to the fixed vs. multiple futures conflict was "simultaneously tragic and scary and hopeful", but added that it "felt right for the story".

In 2013, Deadline Hollywood announced that a television adaptation was being prepared for NBC, with script written by Eric Garcia.

== Awards ==
Year	Award	Category	Result	Ref.
2011	Nebula Award	Novelette	Finalist	
2012	Hugo Award	Novelette	Won	
2012	Theodore Sturgeon Award	—	Runner-up	
