= The Fermi Paradox Is Our Business Model =

- Short story by Charlie Jane Anders
- Cover of first edition (ebook)
- Country: United States
- Language: English
- Genre: Science fiction short story

Publication
- Published in: Tor.com
- Publication type: Periodical
- Publisher: Macmillan Publishers
- Media type: Online magazine
- Publication date: August 11, 2010

"The Fermi Paradox Is Our Business Model" is a science fiction short story by American writer Charlie Jane Anders. It was first published in the online magazine Tor.com August 11, 2010.

== The "business model" ==
An alien race called Falshi uses the creation of civilizations and the Fermi Paradox as a means of accumulating and collecting valuable resources.

Their "business model" consists of the following steps:

1. Use life-seeding devices to spread basic single-celled life on billions of planets in a target galaxy (i.e. panspermia)
2. Wait millions or billions of years for life to evolve to sentience on several of these planets.
3. Individual starships then secretly monitor the radio transmissions of these civilizations, once they develop into a technological society. The crew then goes into stasis for millennia at a time but are brought out of stasis by automated systems when they detect that radio transmissions have ceased.
4. Most industrial civilizations will eventually render themselves extinct through warfare, usually involving weapons of mass destruction (nuclear, biological, etc.) but other times simply overpopulation, depleted resources, and pollution. The Falshi call this "Closure".
5. While the civilization flourished, it extracted most of the construction metals, valuable radioactive elements, and other rare or useful resources from within the planet. Once they have killed themselves off, the silently observing Falshi then move in and simply collect these already-extracted resources from the surface. On a net level across an entire galaxy over millions of years, this is significantly cheaper than sending out automated drones to directly mine for the resources.

It is illegal to outright invade one of the seeded civilizations, and the Falshi must wait for them to drive themselves into extinction without outside interference. The Falshi do not manipulate the seeded civilization in any way, nor were they genetically designed with a predisposition to kill each other: the Falshi simply discovered that (according to the Fermi Paradox) most industrial civilizations will drive themselves into extinction before developing interstellar spaceflight. The percentage of civilizations that survive to an interstellar stage is actually so astronomically low that out of billions of planets to choose from, a single survey ship might never encounter one.

== Synopsis ==
Two Falshi, Jon and Toku, are on their way to a planet called Earth which they presume has met its demise like all the other planets they have visited. However, after waking from stasis, they discover that humanity has survived their "Closure" within a megastructure. Jon and Toku are then contacted by the surviving humans before later allowing a human ship to dock with them. As a human envoy boards their ship, Jon and Toku utilize a universal translator to communicate with the humans. The human leader, Renolz, reveals that the megastructure houses are all that remain from human civilization due to a nuclear war hundreds of years earlier.

Out of curiosity, Jon reveals the origins of humanity and the Falshi business model, despite Toku's protests. The humans are dismayed to learn their existence is little more than a disposable labor force for the Falshi. Despite this, the humans offer a trade alliance with the Falshi but are rejected by Toku. Irritated, Renolz criticizes the Falshi for their callousness and vulture-like business practices. Toku attempts to ease the tension by half-heartedly offering for the Falshi to return in a thousand years to check on the humans. Her offer is countered by Renolz, who cryptically states that humanity may instead find them.

Fearful of escalating the situation further, Toku cuts off communication and waits until the humans' dwindling air supply forces them to return to Earth. As they leave, Renolz ominously vows that the Falshi will hear from humanity again. Unable to proceed with resource collection, Jon and Toku decide to return to the nearest trading station. Jon remains optimistic that the humans will eventually destroy themselves regardless. Toku worries that their interference has given humanity, now aware of the Falshi and their operations, a reason to survive.

== Reception ==
Locus Online's Lois Tilton reviewed the short story as "an entertaining story, a neat and original take on a classic SFnal trope." Tangent Online's Duane Donald reviewed it as "a very interesting tale of very long-lived extraterrestrials" but noted it "was over sooner than I would have liked." The short story was selected for Locus's 2010 Recommended Reading List, and Gardner Dozois listed it as an 'honorable mention' for The Year's Best Science Fiction: Twenty-Eighth Annual Collection.

== See also ==
- "The Gentle Vultures", by Isaac Asimov of another alien race which enslaves or holds for tribute civilizations which have blown themselves up
- "Rescue Party", early Arthur C. Clarke in which aliens arriving at Earth on brink of destruction are taken aback by speed of human technological progress
