= Justina Ireland =

American science-fiction writer

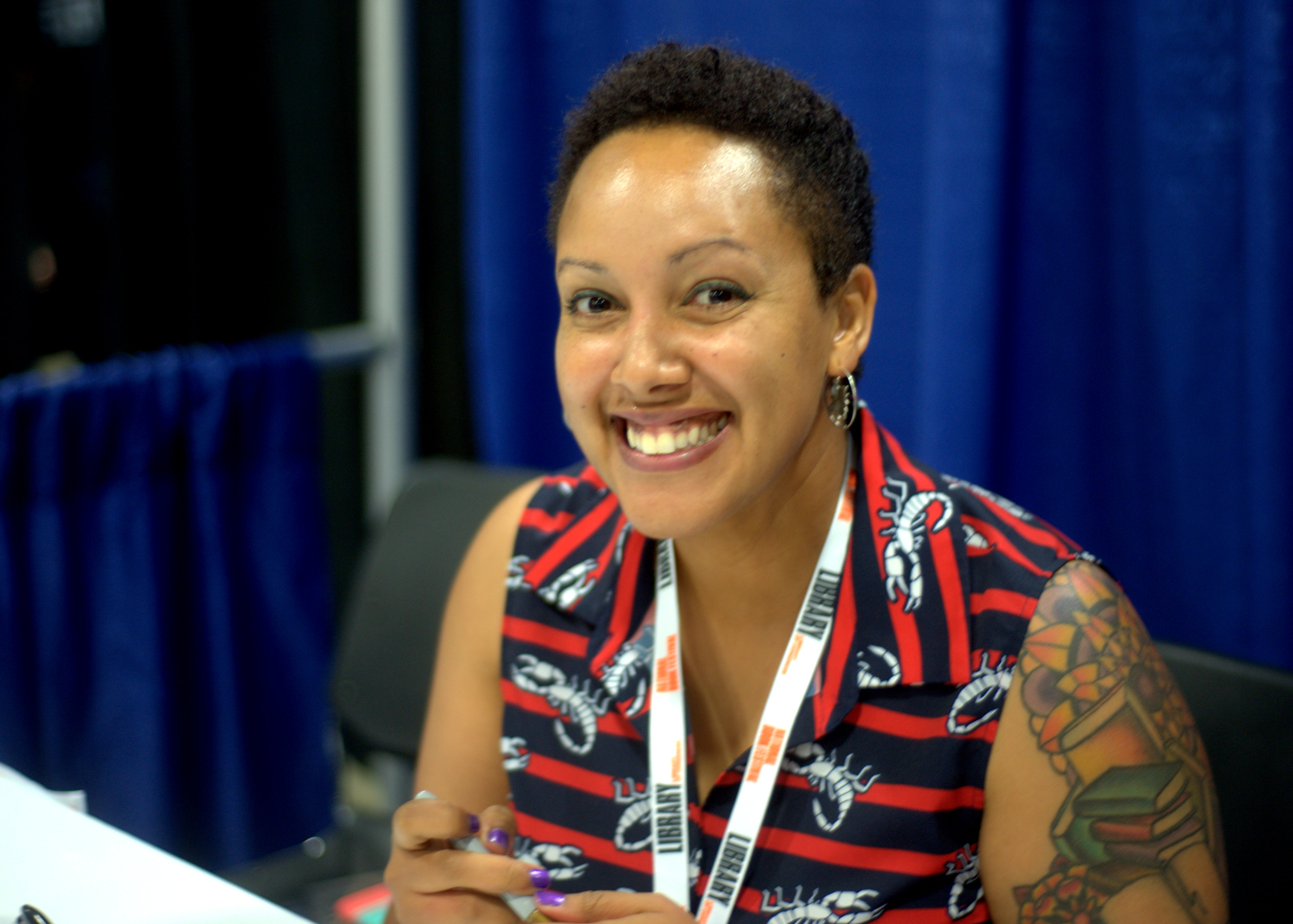
- Justina Ireland in 2018 at the National Book Festival
- Born: February 7, 1985 (age 41); French Camp, California, U.S.
- Education: Armstrong Atlantic State University (BA); Hamline University (MFA)
- Occupation: Novelist
- Writing career
- Genres: Science fiction Young Adult
- Website: justinaireland.com

Justina Ireland (born February 7, 1985) is an American science fiction and fantasy author of young adult fiction and former editor-in-chief of the FIYAH Literary Magazine. She received the 2018 World Fantasy Award for Non-Professional Work. Her New York Times bestselling novel Dread Nation won the 2019 Locus Award, and was nominated for the Andre Norton, Bram Stoker, and Lodestar Awards.

== Early life and education ==
As a teen, Ireland had aspirations to become a historian. She enlisted in the military at nineteen, where she would serve as an Arabic linguistics expert.

Ireland holds a BA in History from Armstrong Atlantic State University and an MFA in Writing for Children and Young Adults from Hamline University, where she wrote a thesis on "microaggressions in children’s literature". She is currently pursuing her PhD in English Literature.

== Career ==
Now based in York, Pennsylvania, Ireland works for the U.S. Navy as a director of logistics and weapon-systems support, and teaches creative writing at York College of Pennsylvania, where she is an adjunct lecturer in the department of Communication and Writing.

=== Writing ===
Ireland is known for writing strong female characters, and for addressing issues of race, class, power, misogyny, sexism, and colorism in her fiction.

==== Dread Nation ====
Her best-known novel, Dread Nation, is an alternate history set in 19th century U.S. In this timeline, the Civil War ends when zombies emerge from their graves at Gettysburg. The enslaved are then freed, but Black and Indigenous children are then trained to fight the undead and protect the nation. The main character, Jane McKeene, is a biracial teen sent to a prestigious combat school where she trains in hopes of being assigned to a wealthy white family.

Dread Nation received largely positive reviews that praised Ireland for her skillful approach to dealing with difficult issues related to slavery and its legacy. Kirkus Reviews wrote, "With a shrewd, scythe-wielding protagonist of color, Dread Nation is an exciting must-read." School Library Journal, in their review, stated, "Ireland skillfully works in the different forms of enslavement, mental and physical, into a complex and engaging story" and declared that the novel is "A perfect blend of horrors real and imagined". Alex Brown of Tor.com wrote, "Dread Nation is the perfect example of why we need more diversity in the YA author pool. Only a Black American woman could write Dread Nation."

== Advocacy and activism ==
Ireland is known as an outspoken advocate for diversifying YA literature. Lila Shapiro, in a 2018 article in New York, called her "YA Twitter’s Leading Warrior." She has been vocal about the need for more authors of color, and stories that feature characters of color in YA literature.

Ireland is also the founder of Writing in the Margins, an organization that provides mentorship to writers from historically marginalized groups.

== Personal life ==
Ireland is married and has a child. The family lives together in York, Pennsylvania.

== Bibliography ==
=== Standalone novels ===
- —— (2013). Vengeance Bound. Simon & Schuster Books for Young Readers. ISBN 9781442444621.
- —— (2014). Promise of Shadows. Simon & Schuster Books for Young Readers. ISBN 9781442444645.
- —— (2018). Scream Site. Capstone Editions. ISBN 9781630791025.
- —— (2021). Ophie's Ghosts. Balzer + Bray. ISBN 9780062915894.
- —— (2022). Rust in the Root. Balzer + Bray. ISBN 9780063038226.
- Ireland, Justina (2023). Never and Again. Recorded Books, LLC. ASIN B091QCZCF3.
- Ireland, Justina (2024). Tales from Cabin 23: The Boo Hag Flex. Clarion Books. ISBN 9780063287822.

=== Dread Nation Series ===
- —— (2018). Dread Nation. Balzer + Bray. ISBN 9780062570604.
- —— (2020). Deathless Divide. Balzer + Bray. ISBN 9780062570635.
- —— (2020). Three for the Road: Stories from Dread Nation. ASIN B08JLC2V1Q.
  - "Dread South" (2017)
  - "Letters From Home" (2018)
  - "Dread Quarter" (2020)

=== Devils' Pass ===
- —— (2017). Evie Allen vs. the Quiz Bowl Zombies. Stone Arch Books. ISBN 9781496549884.
- —— (2017). Jeff Allen vs. the Time Suck Vampire. Stone Arch Books. ISBN 9781496549860.
- —— (2017). Tiffany Donovan vs. the Cookie Elves of Destruction. Stone Arch Books. ISBN 9781496549877.
- —— (2017). Zach Lopez vs. the Unicorns of Doom. Stone Arch Books. ISBN 9781496549891.
- —— (2018). Tiffany Donovan vs. the Poison Werewolves. Stone Arch Books. ISBN 9781496565259.
- —— (2018). Zach Lopez vs. the Shadow Cats. Stone Arch Books. ISBN 9781496565242.

=== Star Wars contributions ===
==== Flight of the Falcon ====
- —— (2018). Star Wars: Lando's Luck. Disney Lucasfilm Press. ISBN 9781368041508.

==== Journey to Star Wars: The Rise of Skywalker ====
- —— (2019). Spark of the Resistance. Disney Lucasfilm Press. ISBN 9781368050814.

==== The High Republic ====
- Light of the Jedi Series
  - —— (2021). A Test of Courage. Disney Lucasfilm Press. ISBN 9781368057301.
  - —— (2021). Out of the Shadows. Disney Lucasfilm Press. ISBN 9781368060653.
  - —— (2022). Mission to Disaster. Disney Lucasfilm Press. ISBN 9781368068000.
- Starlight:
  - —— (2021). "Hidden Danger Part 2". Star Wars Insider: The High Republic – Starlight Stories. Disney Lucasfilm Press. ISBN 9781787738652.
  - —— (2021). The Edge of Balance Vol. 1. Viz Media. ISBN 9781974725885.
  - —— (2022). Path of Deceit. Disney Lucasfilm Press. ISBN 9781368076128.

=== Contributions to anthologies ===
Year	Contribution	Anthology	Editor	ISBN
2015	"Such a Lovely Monster" (short story)	Among the Shadows: Thirteen Stories of Darkness and Light	ed. Demitria Lunetta, Mindy McGinnis, Kate Karyus Quinn	ISBN 9781516860654
2017	"Dread South" (short story)	Three Sides of a Heart: Stories About Love Triangles	ed. Natalie C. Parker	ISBN 9780062424495
2017	"Jackie's Story"	Feral Youth	ed. Shaun David Hutchinson, Suzanne Young, Marieke Nijkamp	ISBN 9781481491112
2019	"Calendar Girls" (short story)	A People's Future of the United States	ed. John Joseph Adams, Victor LaValle	ISBN 9780525508809
2019	"Kissing Sarah Smart"	Black Enough: Stories of Being Young & Black in America	ed. Ibi Zoboi	ISBN 9780062698742
2020	"Melie" (novelette)	A Phoenix First Must Burn	ed. Patrice Caldwell	ISBN 9781984835659
2021	"I Know the Way"	This Is Our Rainbow: 16 Stories of Her, Him, Them, and Us	ed. Katherine Locke, Nicole Melleby	ISBN 9780593303962

== Awards and nominations ==
Year	Nominee	Award	Category	Result	Ref
2018	FIYAH (w/ Troy L. Wiggins)	World Fantasy Awards	Non-Professional	Won	
2018	Dread Nation	Bram Stoker Awards	Young Adult	Shortlisted	
2018	Dread Nation	Goodreads Choice Awards	Young Adult Fantasy & Science Fiction	Nominated (12th)	
2019	Dread Nation	Lodestar Award	—	Shortlisted	
2019	Dread Nation	Locus Award	Young Adult	Won (1st)	
2019	Dread Nation	Nebula Award	Andre Norton Award	Shortlisted	
2020	Deathless Divide	Ladies of Horror Fiction Award	Young Adult	Nominated	
2021	Deathless Divide	Locus Award	Young Adult	Nominated (8th)	
