= Writers with Drinks =

Writers With Drinks is a literary event that has run monthly since 2001 in San Francisco, California. It is a spoken word variety show hosted by Charlie Jane Anders, who MCs and introduces the six readers from six different genres including literary fiction, poetry, stand-up comedy, erotica or porn, science fiction and fantasy, blogging, reporting, memoir, and non-fiction.

Proceeds from the event went towards the production of Other magazine until 2008; they are now donated to the Center for Sex and Culture. The series has influenced a generation of San Francisco Bay Area writers and spoken word performers.

== Awards ==
- Best of the Bay Award. 2005, 2006, 2007, 2008.
