= Dreams Bigger Than Heartbreak =

2022 science fiction novel

- Author: Charlie Jane Anders
- Language: English
- Series: Unstoppable #2
- Genre: Young adult, space opera
- Publisher: Tor Teen
- Publication date: April 5, 2022
- ISBN: 9781250317391
- Preceded by: Victories Greater Than Death
- Followed by: Promises Stronger Than Darkness

Dreams Bigger Than Heartbreak is the second installment in the Unstoppable trilogy by Charlie Jane Anders.

== Synopsis ==
The book picks up after the end of Victories Greater Than Death, alternating between the point-of-view of Tina (the protagonist of the first novel), her girlfriend Elza and friend Rachel as they grow into their new roles. The alien collective known as the Compassion continues their attempt to conquer the galaxy, while a darker threat emerges.

== Reception and awards ==
The book received mostly positive reviews from critics who noted that it avoided the "sophomore slump", in which the second instalment in a trilogy is considered to be worse than its precursor. Maya Gittelman of Tor.com called it "a perfectly balanced YA space opera". Kirkus Reviews and the School Library Journal praised the novel's pacing, writing and characterization. Gary K. Wolfe of Locus also praised the sequel's handling of characters, writing that it made them "more complicated and conflicted" while also introducing new stakes for the protagonists.

Year	Award	Category	Result	Ref.
2023	Locus Award	Young Adult Book	Won	
2023	Lodestar Award	—	Finalist	
