= Source Decay =

- Short story by Charlie Jane Anders
- Country: United States
- Language: English
- Genre(s): Science fiction short story

Publication
- Published in: Strange Horizons
- Publication type: Periodical
- Media type: Online magazine
- Publication date: January 3, 2011

"Source Decay" is a science fiction short story by Charlie Jane Anders. It was first published in the online magazine Strange Horizons January 3, 2011.

The story's title was named after the Mountain Goats song "Source Decay" from their 2002 album All Hail West Texas.

== Synopsis ==
Over the centuries, an episode of the reality television program Infidelity Squad is constantly being remade and adapted for a variety of futuristic mediums as space elevator installations and "metapoem". It eventually becomes the most important cultural artifact in human (and posthuman) history.

== Reception ==
Locus Online's Lois Tilton was critical of the short story stating "The premise has been done before, and the humor is labored." Tangent Online's Rena Hawkins reviewed it saying "I 'get' the idea contained within the story; that even a mundane reality TV episode can be so blown out of proportion by the media and obsessed viewers that it takes on meaning and significance it never possessed to begin with. Unfortunately, Source Decay kicks this idea to death by the time the story ends."
