= The City in the Middle of the Night =

2019 novel by Charlie Jane Anders

- First edition
- Author: Charlie Jane Anders
- Cover artist: Mark Smith
- Language: English
- Genre: Climate fiction
- Publisher: Tor Books
- Publication date: 2019
- Publication place: U.S.
- Media type: Print Hardcover
- Awards: Locus Award for Best Science Fiction Novel
- ISBN: 978-0-7653-7996-2

The City In the Middle of the Night is a 2019 climate-fiction novel by Charlie Jane Anders. It is set on a tidally locked planet, where human life, surrounded by hostile alien life, is mostly divided between two archetypically different urban sites. The main story focuses on two characters whose actions take them outside of the cities.

It explores themes of personal relationships, mixed with coverage of contemporary social and political issues as depicted in its alien setting.

The book won the 2020 Locus Award for Best Science Fiction Novel.

== Summary ==
The story takes place in the far future, on a tidally locked planet called "January". Humans live in the twilight zone, between the boiling heat of the sun-facing side and the frozen wasteland of the night side. Local inhabitants are mostly divided between two diametrically opposite urban locations: Xiosphant, an authoritarian city where citizens' actions are tightly controlled and any deviation is severely punished, and Argelo, a wild anarchy run by competing criminal gangs. On the fringe, traveling between the cities, are groups like the Citizens, who take the road as their home.

The plot alternates between two principal characters. Sophie, from Xiosphant, has both a position in an elite university and a crush on Bianca, her school roommate who is also a student radical. Sophie is expelled from the city and thrown into the freezing wilderness when she takes the blame for a theft committed by Bianca. There, she is rescued by the "crocodiles", who are not dangerous predators like humans think, but an intelligent native species, present long before the humans, which communicates telepathically. Sophie learns to communicate with them, and, with their aid, covertly returns to Xiosphant, with the understanding that she will continue coming back to visit them.

The second main protagonist is Mouth, a former Citizen disturbed by the group's violent destruction on the road, as she attempts to build a new life as a trader. The two story arcs rapidly coalesce, with the connection being initially catalysed by Bianca looking for help with her political plans. This rapidly evolves into a series of dangerous travels that take the characters across the planet, from Xiosphant and Argelo to the unknown wilderness.

== Background ==
Anders was amongst the founders and editors of the science-fiction and technology website io9 before stepping down to concentrate on her writing career.

Writing in The Atlantic, the author notes how her interest in tidally locked planets led her to write the story. She states that exploring scientific research on the subject led her to describe how human life could adapt on such a planet, although there is an inevitable trade-off between accuracy and dramatic requirements.

== Reception ==
Rebecca Evans, writing for the Los Angeles Review of Books, notes how the book's alien setting, which is far from any realistic depiction of climate change, is a "critical form of defamiliarization" and a way to discuss a familiar contemporary subject without retreading old tales. She compares the dichotomy between the two urban centers to Le Guin's The Dispossessed, and remarks how Anders employs the contrast between the two to probe philosophy and ethics, with the "raw, painful honesty" of the characters and their diversity helping to convincingly portray the larger issues, social and environmental, which are the focus of the novel. Jason Sheehan, reviewing for NPR, describes the book as "a story about how grand social ideas break, and who gets hurt worst in the breaking", a fable-like tale of action and adventure which, through an intimate depiction of intrapersonal relationships, takes a look "at our moment in history" through the distorting lens of its setting. According to Adam Roberts of The Guardian, it is a "millenial's novel", and the characters, sometimes judgmental and self-righteous, ultimately also show sophistication and passion, combining to deliver a heartfelt tale.

Evans notes that Anders' story diverges from other works in its genre not so much because of the underlying themes, but in how it strays from the recognisable cautionary tales and instead lays out an approach to living meaningful lives amidst a devastated environment. It is a long story whose main narrative, according to Roberts, is that of the possible rapprochement between humans and aliens who live in an atmosphere of mutual disgust. He notes that this is "well done", although not particularly original, comparing it with plot lines from Star Trek episodes featuring Captain Picard.

Awards and honors
| Year | Award | Category | Result | Ref. |
|---|---|---|---|---|
| 2020 | Arthur C. Clarke Award | — | Shortlisted | |
| 2020 | Hugo Award | Novel | Finalist | |
| 2020 | Locus Award | Science Fiction Novel | Won | |

== Works cited ==
- Anders, Charlie Jane (2019). The City In The Middle Of The Night. New York: Tor Books. ISBN 978-0-7653-7996-2.
