= Charlie Jane Anders =

American science fiction author and commentator (born 1969)

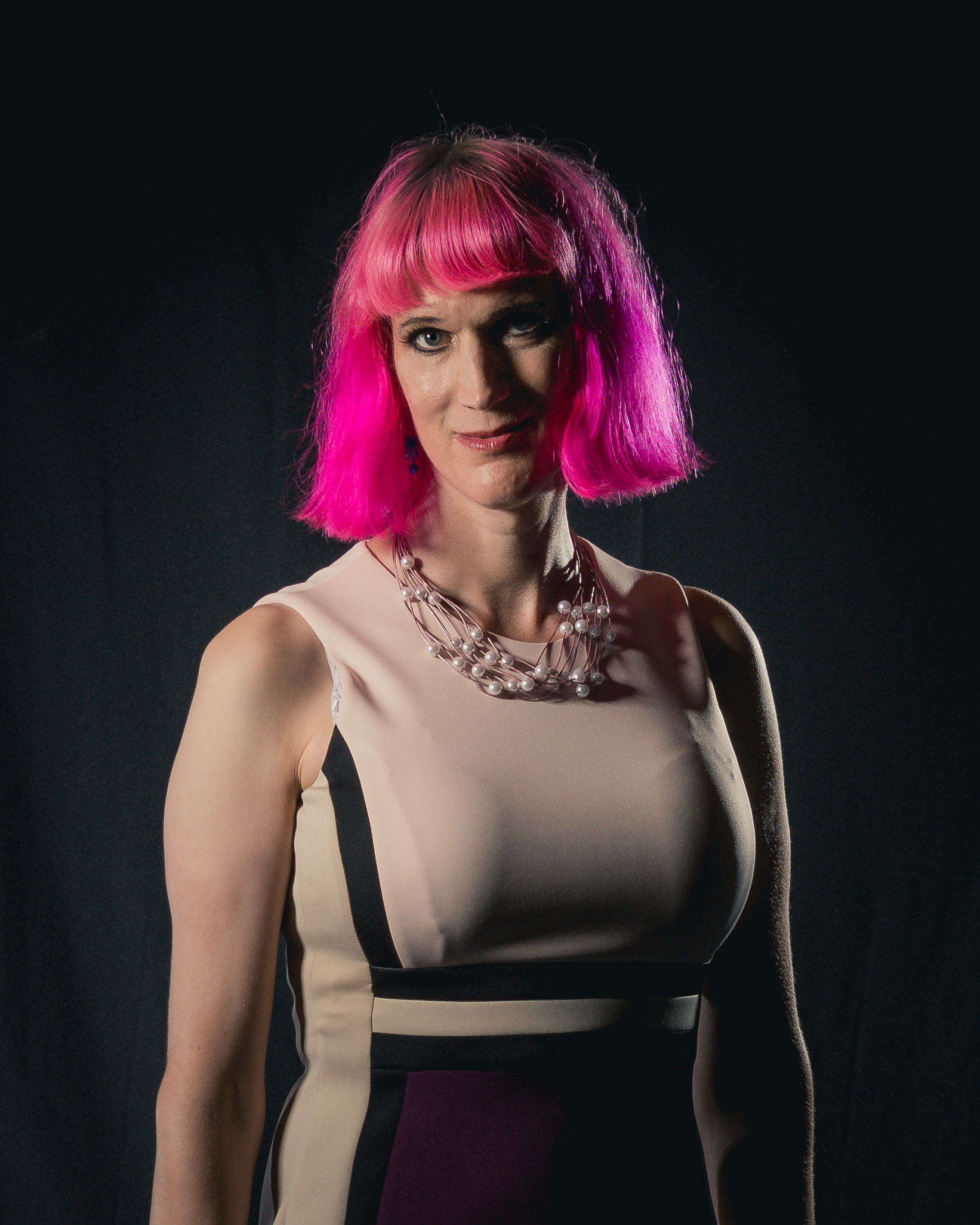
- Anders at Worldcon 75 in 2017
- Born: July 24, 1969 (age 57); Tolland County, Connecticut, U.S.
- Occupations: Writer; editor; presenter; performance artist; publisher
- Writing career
- Genres: Science fiction, short story, fiction, non-fiction
- Notable works: Choir Boy; All the Birds in the Sky
- Website: charliejaneanders.com

Charlie Jane Anders (born July 24, 1969) is an American writer specializing in speculative fiction. She has written several novels as well as shorter fiction. Her novels, including All the Birds in the Sky and The City in the Middle of the Night, have received critical acclaim and won major literary awards. All three novels in her young adult trilogy Unstoppable have won the Locus Award for Best Young Adult Book. In addition to the Locus Award, her work has received the Crawford Award, Hugo Award, Lambda Literary Award, Nebula Award, and Theodore Sturgeon Award.

== Early life and background ==
Anders was born in a small farm town near Storrs, Connecticut and grew up in nearby Mansfield. She studied English and Asian Literature at Clare College at the University of Cambridge. She also studied abroad in China before moving to San Francisco in the early 2000s.

Anders co-founded Other magazine, the "magazine of pop culture and politics for the new outcasts", with Annalee Newitz, and served as publisher during the magazine's run from 2002 to 2007. In 2006, she was a co-founding editor of the science fiction blog io9, a position she left in April 2016 to focus on novel writing.

== Literary career ==
Anders has had science fiction published in Tor.com, Strange Horizons, and Flurb. Additional (non-science-fiction) literary work has been published in McSweeney's and Zyzzyva. Anders's work has appeared in Salon, The Wall Street Journal, Publishers Weekly, San Francisco Bay Guardian, Mother Jones, and the San Francisco Chronicle. She has had stories and essays in anthologies such as Sex For America: Politically Inspired Erotica, The McSweeney's Joke Book of Book Jokes, and That's Revolting!: Queer Strategies for Resisting Assimilation.

Her first novel, Choir Boy, appeared in 2005 from Soft Skull Press; a young adult story about a boy transitioning gender in order to sing. In 2014, Tor Books acquired two novels from Anders. All the Birds in the Sky was published in 2016 and The City in the Middle of the Night was published 2019.

In August 2025, her most recent novel, Lessons in Magic and Disaster, was published by Tor Books. Gary K. Wolfe at Locus Magazine wrote "Lessons in Magic and Disaster is a convincing novel of character long before the spells even begin to kick in. At the same time, Anders’s voice is not without a bracing sense of anger… her most mature and personal novel to date, as well as her finest." The book was a finalist for the Locus Award for Best Fantasy Novel.

=== Unstoppable trilogy ===
Tor Teen acquired Unstoppable, a young adult trilogy from Anders, in 2017. The first novel, Victories Greater Than Death, was published in 2021, and the second, Dreams Bigger Than Heartbreak, in 2022. The third novel, Promises Stronger Than Darkness, was published in 2023.

=== Other work ===
Anders presenting 2026 Hugo Award for Best Related Work

In addition to her work as an author and publisher, Anders is a longtime event organizer. She organized a "ballerina pie fight" in 2005 for Other magazine; co-organized the Cross-Gender Caravan, a national transgender and genderqueer author tour; and a Bookstore and Chocolate Crawl in San Francisco. She emcees "Writers with Drinks", an award-winning San Francisco-based monthly reading series begun in 2001 that features authors from a wide range of genres and has been noted for its "free-associative author introductions".

She has been a juror for the James Tiptree Jr. Award and for the Lambda Literary Award. She formerly published the satirical website godhatesfigs.com which was featured by The Sunday Times as website of the week.

A television adaptation of Anders' Six Months, Three Days was being prepared for NBC in 2013, with the script written by Eric Garcia.

In March 2018, with her partner and co-host Annalee Newitz, Anders launched the podcast Our Opinions Are Correct, which "explor[es] the meaning of science fiction, and how it's relevant to real-life science and society." The podcast won the Hugo Award for Best Fancast in 2019, 2020 and 2022.

Anders co-created the Marvel Comics character Shela Sexton, also known as Escapade, a trans mutant super hero. The character debuted in Marvel's Voices: Pride #1 in June 2022.

== Awards and honors ==
=== Literary awards ===
Year	Work	Award	Category	Result	Ref.
2006	Choir Boy	Edmund White Award	—	Finalist	
2006	Choir Boy	Lambda Literary Award	Transgender Literature	Won	
2011	"Six Months, Three Days"	Nebula Award	Novelette	Finalist	
2012	"Six Months, Three Days"	Hugo Award	Novelette	Won	
2012	"Six Months, Three Days"	Theodore Sturgeon Award	—	Runner-up	
2016	All the Birds in the Sky	Nebula Award	Novel	Won	
2016	All the Birds in the Sky	Time Magazine Top Ten Novels of 2016	—	Listed	
2017	All the Birds in the Sky	Crawford Award	—	Won	
2017	All the Birds in the Sky	Hugo Award	Novel	Finalist	
2017	All the Birds in the Sky	Locus Award	Fantasy Novel	Won	
2017	"Don't Press Charges and I Won't Sue"	James Tiptree Jr. Award	—	Honor List	
2018	"Don't Press Charges and I Won't Sue"	Locus Award	Short Story	Finalist	
2018	"Don't Press Charges and I Won't Sue"	Theodore Sturgeon Award	—	Won	
2018	Six Months, Three Days, Five Others	Locus Award	Collection	Finalist	
2020	All the Birds in the Sky	Time Magazine 100 Best Fantasy Books of All Time	—	Listed	
2020	"The Bookstore at the End of America"	Locus Award	Short Story	Won	
2020	The City in the Middle of the Night	Arthur C. Clarke Award	—	Shortlisted	
2020	The City in the Middle of the Night	Hugo Award	Novel	Finalist	
2020	The City in the Middle of the Night	Locus Award	Science Fiction Novel	Won	
2021	All the Birds in the Sky	Seiun Award	Translated Novel	Finalist	
2021	"If You Take My Meaning"	Locus Award	Novelette	Finalist	
2021	"If You Take My Meaning"	Theodore Sturgeon Award	—	Finalist	
2021	Victories Greater Than Death	Andre Norton Award	—	Finalist	
2022	Victories Greater Than Death	Locus Award	Young Adult Book	Won	
2022	Victories Greater Than Death	Lodestar Award	—	Finalist	
2022	Even Greater Mistakes	Locus Award	Collection	Won	
2022	Never Say You Can’t Survive	Hugo Award	Related Work	Won	
2022	Never Say You Can’t Survive	World Fantasy Award	Special-Professional	Finalist	
2023	Dreams Bigger Than Heartbreak	Locus Award	Young Adult Book	Won	
2023	Dreams Bigger Than Heartbreak	Lodestar Award	—	Finalist	
2024	Promises Stronger Than Darkness	Locus Award	Young Adult Book	Won	
2024	Promises Stronger Than Darkness	Lodestar Award	—	Finalist	
2024	"A Soul in the World"	Locus Award	Short Story	Finalist	
2025	—	Ignyte Award	Ember Award	Finalist	
2026	Lessons in Magic and Disaster	Locus Award	Fantasy Novel	Finalist	

=== Fancasts ===
Year	Work	Award	Category	Result	Ref.
2019	Our Opinions Are Correct (with Annalee Newitz)	Hugo Award	Fancast	Won	
2020	Our Opinions Are Correct (with Annalee Newitz)	Hugo Award	Fancast	Won	
2022	Our Opinions Are Correct (with Annalee Newitz)	Hugo Award	Fancast	Won	

== Bibliography ==
=== Novels ===
- —— (2005). Choir Boy. Soft Skull Press. ISBN 9781932360813.
- —— (2016). All the Birds in the Sky. Tor Books. ISBN 9780765379948.
- —— (2019). The City in the Middle of the Night. Tor Books. ISBN 9780765379962.
- —— (2025). Lessons in Magic and Disaster. Tor Books. ISBN 9781250867322.

==== Unstoppable ====
- —— (2021). Victories Greater Than Death. Tor Teen. ISBN 9781250317315.
- —— (2022). Dreams Bigger Than Heartbreak. Tor Teen. ISBN 9781250317391.
- —— (2023). Promises Stronger Than Darkness. Tor Teen. ISBN 9781250317506.

=== Short story collections ===
- —— (2017). Six Months, Three Days, Five Others. Tor.com. ISBN 9780765394897.
- —— (2021). Even Greater Mistakes. Tor Books. ISBN 9781250766502.

=== Short fiction ===
Year	Title	Scope (Note: Short stories unless otherwise noted.)	First published	Notes
2008	"Love Might Be Too Strong a Word"		—— (June 2008). Grant, Gavin J.; Link, Kelly (eds.). "Love Might Be Too Strong a Word". Lady Churchill's Rosebud Wristlet (22). Small Beer Press.	
2010	"The Fermi Paradox Is Our Business Model"		—— (August 11, 2010). "The Fermi Paradox Is Our Business Model". Tor.com.	
2011	"Source Decay"		—— (January 3, 2011). "Source Decay". Strange Horizons.	
2011	"Fairy Werewolf vs. Vampire Zombie"		—— (March 22, 2011). Gunn, Eileen (ed.). "Fairy Werewolf vs. Vampire Zombie". Flurb: A Webzine of Astonishing Tales (11).	
2011	"Six Months, Three Days"	Novelette	—— (June 8, 2011). "Six Months, Three Days". Tor.com.	
2011	"Mooney & Finch Somnotrope"		—— (July 12, 2011). "Mooney & Finch Somnotrope". In VanderMeer, Ann; VanderMeer, Jeff (eds.). The Thackery T. Lambshead Cabinet of Curiosities. Harper Voyager.	
2012	"Intestate"		—— (December 17, 2012). "Intestate". Tor.com.	
2013	"Complicated and Stupid"		—— (August 5, 2013). "Complicated and Stupid". Strange Horizons.	
2013	"Victimless Crimes"		—— (August 6, 2013). "Victimless Crimes". Apex Magazine. No. 51.	
2013	"The Master Conjurer"		—— (October 2013). "The Master Conjurer". Lightspeed Magazine. No. 41.	
2013	"The Time Travel Club"	Novelette	—— (October–November 2013). "The Time Travel Club". Asimov's Science Fiction. 37 (10–11): 20–35.	
2014	"The Cartography of Sudden Death"		—— (January 15, 2014). "The Cartography of Sudden Death". Tor.com.	
2014	"Break! Break! Break!"		—— (March 2014). "Break! Break! Break!". Lightspeed Magazine. No. 46.	
2014	"The Unfathomable Sisterhood of Ick"		—— (June 2014). "The Unfathomable Sisterhood of Ick". Lightspeed Magazine. No. 49: Women Destroy Science Fiction!.	
2014	"Palm Strike's Last Case"	Novelette	—— (July 2014). "Palm Strike's Last Case". The Magazine of Fantasy & Science Fiction. Vol. 127, no. 1 & 2. pp. 6–34.	
2014	"Rock Manning Can't Hear You"		—— (September 1, 2014). "Rock Manning Can't Hear You". In Adams, John Joseph; Howey, Hugh (eds.). The End Is Now. pp. 55–68.	
2014	"The Day It All Ended"		—— (September 9, 2014). "The Day It All Ended". In Cramer, Kathryn; Finn, Ed (eds.). Hieroglyph: Stories and Visions for a Better Future. William Morrow. pp. 477–488.	
2014	"As Good As New"		—— (September 10, 2014). "As Good As New". Tor.com.	
2015	"The Last Movie Ever Made"		—— (May 1, 2015). "The Last Movie Ever Made". In Adams, John Joseph; Howey, Hugh (eds.). The End Has Come. Broad Reach.	
2015	"Ghost Champagne"	Novelette	—— (July 2015). "Ghost Champagne". Uncanny Magazine (5).	
2015	"Rat Catcher's Yellows"		—— (August 18, 2015). "Rat Catcher's Yellows". In Adams, John Joseph; Wilson, Daniel H. (eds.). Press Start to Play. Vintage Books.	
2016	"Captain Roger in Heaven"	Novelette	—— (2016). "Captain Roger in Heaven" (PDF). Catamaran Literary Reader. No. 14.	
2016	"Reliable People"		—— (Fall 2016). "Reliable People". Conjunctions. No. 67.	
2016	"Because Change Was the Ocean and We Lived By Her Mercy"		—— (July 2016). "Because Change Was the Ocean and We Lived By Her Mercy". In Strahan, Jonathan (ed.). Drowned Worlds. Solaris.	
2016	"Clover"		—— (October 25, 2016). "Clover". Tor.com.	Follows All the Birds in the Sky.
2017	"A Temporary Embarrassment in Spacetime"	Novelette	—— (April 2017). "A Temporary Embarrassment in Spacetime". In Adams, John Joseph (ed.). Cosmic Powers. Saga Press.	
2017	"Don't Press Charges and I Won't Sue"		—— (October 30, 2017). "Don't Press Charges and I Won't Sue". Boston Review.	
2018	Rock Manning Goes for Broke	Novella	—— (July 2018). Rock Manning Goes for Broke. Subterranean Press.	Follows "Rock Manning Can't Hear You".
2018	"The Minnesota Diet"		—— (January 17, 2018). "The Minnesota Diet". Future Tense.	
2019	"This Is Why We Can't Have Nasty Things"		—— (2019). "This Is Why We Can't Have Nasty Things". ZYZZYVA (117).	
2019	"The Bookstore at the End of America"		—— (February 5, 2019). "The Bookstore at the End of America". In Adams, John Joseph; LaValle, Victor (eds.). A People's Future of the United States. One World.	
2020	"If You Take My Meaning"		—— (February 26, 2020). "If You Take My Meaning". Tor.com.	Follows City in the Middle of the Night.
2020	"The Turnaround"		—— (July 1, 2020). "The Turnaround". Alta Online.	
2020	"The Visitmothers"		—— (December 8, 2020). "The Visitmothers". In Rogue, Lydia (ed.). Trans-Galactic Bike Ride: Feminist Bicycle Science Fiction Stories of Transgender and Nonbinary Adventurers. Elly Blue Publishing.	
2021	"My Breath Is a Rudder"		—— (November 9, 2021). "My Breath Is a Rudder". Even Greater Mistakes. Titan Books.	
2021	"Power Couple"		—— (November 9, 2021). "Power Couple". Even Greater Mistakes. Titan Books.	
2023	"A Soul in the World"		—— (2023). "A Soul in the World". Uncanny Magazine.	Prequel to Victories Greater Than Death.
2026	"The Weak Ask, the Strong Know"		—— (September 22, 2026). "The Weak Ask, the Strong Know". In Strahan, Jonathan (ed.). Revolution in the Heart: Stories Inspired by Ursula K. Le Guin. Titan Books.	

=== Non-fiction ===
- —— (2002). The Lazy Crossdresser. California: Greenery Press. ISBN 9781890159375. (published as Charles Anders)
- ——; Newitz, Annalee (2006). She's Such a Geek: Women Write About Science, Technology, and Other Nerdy Stuff. California: Seal Press. ISBN 9781580051903.
- —— (2021). Never Say You Can't Survive: How to Get Through Hard Times By Making Up Stories. New York: Tordotcom. ISBN 9781250800015.

=== Interviews ===
- Sirius, R.U. (January 31, 2007). "Girls Are Geeks, Too". 10 Zen Monkeys.

== Critical studies and reviews of Anders' work ==
- "Choir Boy: Charlie Anders". Softskull.com. Softskull Press. Archived from the original on October 19, 2012.
- Woyke, Elizabeth. "Other". The New York Review of Magazines. Archived from the original on February 23, 2015.
