= Southern Caribbean upwelling system =

Low latitude tropical upwelling system

The Southern Caribbean Upwelling system (SCUS) is a low latitude tropical upwelling system, where due to multiple environmental and bathymetric conditions water from the deep sea is forced to the surface layers of the ocean. The SCUS is located at about 10°N on the southern coast of the Caribbean sea basin off Colombia, Venezuela, and Trinidad.

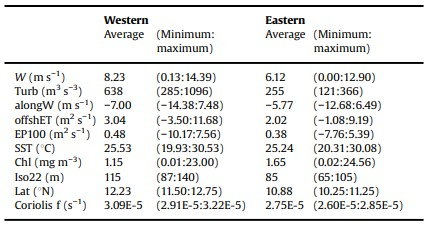
A comparison between the WUZ and EUZ showing the minimum and maximum values for: Wind speed (W), Turbulence (Turb), alongshore wind speed (alongW), Offshore Ekman transport due to wind (offshET). Vertical transport due to Ekman pumping integrated to 100k offshore (EP100), Sea Surface Temperature (SST), chlorophyll-a(Chl).

There are two main upwelling zones in the system that vary in intensity throughout the year; the Western Upwelling Zone (WUZ); and the Eastern Upwelling Zone; (EUZ). The western WUZ is situated between 74-71°W and generates mainly seasonal upwelling and high offshore transport due to intense winds. The EUZ, situated between 71-60°W is less intense but is more favourable for the upwelling throughout the year.

== General information ==
For thirty years after 1990, the upwelling has intensified which is producing cooling of the sea surface temperature (SST) in the WUZ, this is in contrast to the general temperature in the Caribbean Sea which has shown to increase. The "typical" Caribbean surface water is a mixture of North Atlantic Surface Water (NASW) and riverine waters from the Orinoco and Amazon rivers.

The intensity of the Caribbean low-level jet (further explanation below) and the coastal orientation are determining the timing and spatial variability of this upwelling system. The system is likely to be responsible for a major part in the primary production due to the addition of nutrients that are added to the system through the upwelling.

Under the Caribbean surface waters more saline water is found with values close to those typical for the Subtropical Underwater (SUW) SA(salinity) ~37, Θ ~22 °C. This forms a subsurface maximum(SSM) of more saline water than the water on top of it. After the rainy season the SSM is lower due to dilution of the surface waters.

== Characterization of the SCUS ==
Since 1994 variations in upwelling are studied using cycles of satellite SST (Sea surface Temperature). The SST this is used as a proxy for upwelling (explained in more detail below) in this tropical region As well as the dominant winds and chlorophyll a. These are all proxies that are relatively easy to measure and quite easily accessible.

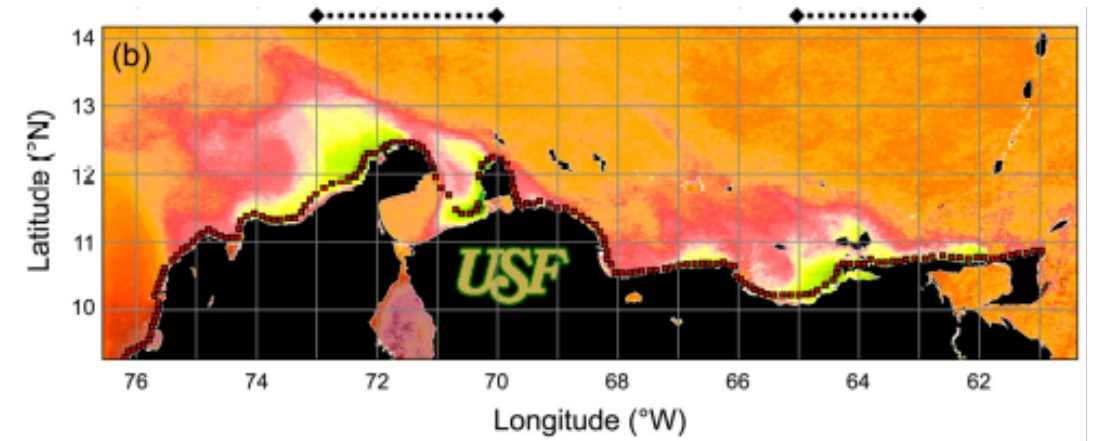
Upwelling zones in the Southern Caribbean shown through SST Data.

=== Location and source of the SCUS ===
The location of the SCUS is depending on the Rossby radius or R. The rossby radius $R = \sqrt{{g}\frac{\Delta\rho}{\rho}\frac{h}{f}}$ changes the positioning of the upwelling relative to the coastline. The Rossby radius for this region is ~19 km; estimated using a mean depth h= 35m, gravity g = 9,81 m s -1. The upwelling zones are found close to the coast roughly within the 19 km found within the Rossby radius. However, in rare cases upwelled water moves offshore by over 250 km from the coast.

Upwelled waters in the SCUS are consistent in geochemical compositions with the "Subtropical Underwater". This is a water mass that comes from the central Atlantic and due to its relative dense water properties (SA (salinity) ~37g per kg water, Temperature ~22 °C) lays under the Caribbean surface waters. Because the properties are so similar to the water that is upwelled in the SCUS its likely that the water comes from this water mass.

=== Sea surface temperature (SST) ===
The SCUS is studied through the SST at a high resolution (1 km grid) radiometer (National Oceanic and Atmospheric Administration / NOAA). This data is used to identify differences in the SST and to locate upwelling regions. There is a semi-annual cycle of SST within the upwelling areas. With cooling periodically occurring between December and April, showing 2-4 upwelling pulses peaking during February–March. Around May there is a typical increase in SST followed by cooling during June–August due to a midyear upwelling. There is a strong relationship between SST and Chlorophyll-a, this is explained more later in this article.

=== Wind ===
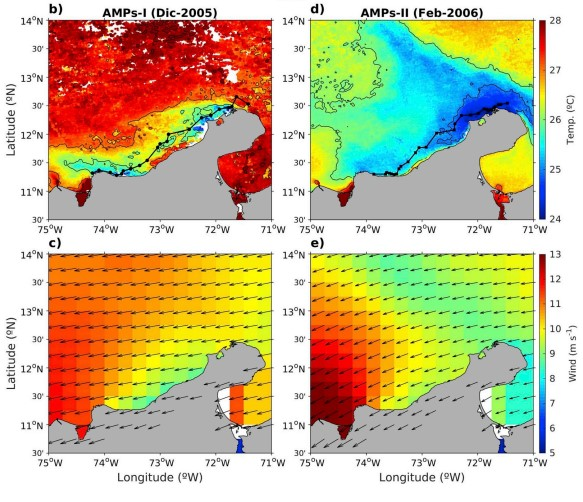
Seasonal differences in wind and connected SST. (b) and (c) show the wind in December and SST that comes with it. (d) and (e) show the same in February.

The trade winds that blow over the southern Caribbean Sea, amplified by the Caribbean low-level jet generate northward Ekman transport. The intensity of the trade winds varies per season (the image of the Seasonal differences shows the WUZ b) and c) in December and d) and e) in February) and explains the variation in upwelling and the measured differences in SST that are mentioned above. The driving forces of the Ekman transport is wind-stress or "τ" (wind stress on the seasurface). The driving winds are divided in multiple areas; East of 68°W has relative stable wind speeds (>6 m $s^-1$), and slightly lower during August–November (4 – 6 m $s^-1$).

The direction of the wind is generally parallel to the southern Caribbean Sea margin. However, between May and October the EUZ has more along shore winds that are ~1.7° varying from the along-shore direction and during November until April the direction is more onshore within ±12°. In the WUZ the wind is more offshore in the majority of the year approximately -14°. This changes during October–November when winds are aligned with the shoreline ~0.2°. These wind directions produce the northward wind curl and thus offshore Ekman transport that are favourable year round for the SCUS.

=== Chlorophyll-a ===
Chlorophyll a is used to see the productivity of phytoplankton and therefore zooplankton. Amounts of chlorophyll-a increase with higher nutrient concentrations that are found in upwelled water and can therefore be used as a proxy for upwelling systems. Within the SCUS there are strong correlations between the SST and Chlorophyll-a. These show a Chlorophyll-a maximum in December and April and a shorter maximum between June and July further confirming the upwelling of nutrient rich water.

== Biological impact ==
As mentioned in the Chlorophyll-a section, nutrient concentrations that come with the water from the SUW have a strong positive impact on the phytoplankton productivity. It is estimated that up to 95% of the small pelagic biomass is the southern Caribbean sea is sustained by the primary production that comes with these upwelled waters.

In the EUZ there is a four time higher amount of small pelagic biomass compared to the WUZ. This difference is contributed to the prolonged duration of the upwelling. The water in the EUZ has a SST < 26°C for 8.5 months and the WUZ for 6.9. In addition to that, the EUZ has a wider continental shelf. Upwelling over wide and shallow continental shelves can generate resuspension and transport of essential microelements from the benthic boundary layer to the surface.

== The Caribbean low-level jet (CLLJ) ==
The CLLJ has a core in the western basin (70°W - 80°W, 15°N) and maximum horizontal wind speeds of up to 16 m/s that tops in July and February. The Caribbean low-level jet is an amplification of the large-scale circulation of the North Atlantic subtropical high (NASH). The NASH interacts closely with the trade winds and therefor connects the CLLJ with the tradewinds.
