= Dread Nation =

2018 novel by Justina Ireland

- Author: Justina Ireland
- Genre: Young adult, alternate history, horror
- Publisher: Clarion Books
- Publication date: April 3, 2018
- Pages: 464
- ISBN: 9780062570604

Dread Nation is a 2018 young adult alternate history horror novel by author Justina Ireland. The book is set in an alternate version of American history, where the American Civil War is interrupted by a zombie outbreak in the battlefields of Gettysburg, Pennsylvania.

== Plot ==
In an alternate retelling of 19th-century America, the Battle of Gettysburg doesn't end with the Union victory that Americans have come to learn in history books. Instead, a shocking turn of events causes the war to halt before it can be won - the dead rise from their battlefield graves. In response to the sudden danger that the undead (called shamblers) pose, the American government passes laws that force Black and indigenous children to attend combat schools to kill the undead—effectively using them as replaceable weapons to defend white children and citizens, and furthering the racial divide.

Jane McKeene, a Black girl born to a white mother, is enrolled at Miss Preston’s School of Combat in Baltimore. She is accustomed to this life up until a shambler attack breaches Baltimore’s supposedly safe walls and sets everything Jane had known ablaze. She uncovers a conspiracy tied to the city's leadership, but raising questions and being defiant leads not to justice, but instead to being exiled to a frontier town that is anything but kind. There, Jane discovers that the shamblers are being used as a power source. She has to decide whether to begin her own rebellion and save her people or accept her role in society - all while she fights for her freedom.

== Reception ==
Dread Nation received mostly positive reviews from critics. School Library Journal gave it a starred review, writing that "Ireland skillfully works in the different forms of enslavement, mental and physical, into a complex and engaging story." Arley Sorg of Locus wrote that it was "well plotted with compelling characters, interesting situations, and fascinating details". The novel received the 2019 Locus Award for Best Young Adult Novel.
