= The First Law =

Fantasy series by Joe Abercrombie

- First edition UK hardback covers for the trilogy
- The Blade Itself; Before They Are Hanged; Last Argument of Kings
- Author: Joe Abercrombie
- Country: United Kingdom
- Language: English
- Genre: Fantasy
- Publisher: Gollancz (UK); Orbit Books (US)
- Published: 2006 – present
- Media type: Print

The First Law is a fantasy series written by British author Joe Abercrombie. The First Law is the title of the original trilogy in the series, but is also used to refer to the series as a whole. The full series consists of a trilogy, three stand-alone novels, short stories, and a second trilogy, titled The Age of Madness, of which the third book was published in September 2021.

The original trilogy is published by Gollancz in the UK and Pyr in the United States. The stand-alone novels remain with Gollancz in the UK but were published by Orbit Books in the United States, with Orbit also releasing later editions of the original trilogy. Gollancz and Orbit also released The Age of Madness trilogy in the UK and the US, respectively.

As of 2023, a film adaptation of Best Served Cold from Skydance Media is in pre-production, with Tim Miller attached to direct. Abercrombie wrote the screenplay and Rebecca Ferguson is set to star as Monza Murcatto.

== Published works ==
Series	Book	UK release	Pages	Words	UK ISBN
The First Law trilogy	The Blade Itself	4 May 2006	529	191,200	978-0575077867
The First Law trilogy	Before They Are Hanged	15 March 2007	539	198,300	978-0575077874
The First Law trilogy	Last Argument of Kings	20 March 2008	603	234,100	978-0575077898
Standalone books	Best Served Cold	June 2009	534	228,000	978-0575082458
Standalone books	The Heroes	January 2011	506		978-0316123358
Standalone books	Red Country	October 2012	451		978-0575095823
Short story collection	Sharp Ends	April 2016	336		978-0575104709
Age of Madness trilogy	A Little Hatred	19 September 2019	471	177,800	978-0575095861
Age of Madness trilogy	The Trouble With Peace	15 September 2020	506	195,300	978-0575095915
Age of Madness trilogy	The Wisdom of Crowds	14 September 2021	560	199,200	978-0575095960
Short story collection	The Great Change (And Other Lies)	18 September 2023	120		978-1645240648

Short stories

Abercrombie's short fiction works were collected in Sharp Ends: Stories from the World of the First Law (April 2016) and The Great Change (And Other Lies) (September 2023).

Story	Published in	Notes
"The Fool Jobs"	Swords & Dark Magic: The New Sword and Sorcery anthology (June 2010) and in Sharp Ends.	Features Curnden Craw and his dozen in events prior to The Heroes.
"Yesterday, Near A Village Called Barden"	As an extra in the Waterstones hardcover version of The Heroes (2012) and in Sharp Ends.	Focuses on Bremer dan Gorst on campaign prior to The Heroes.
"Freedom!"	As an extra in the Waterstones hardcover version of Red Country (2013) and in Sharp Ends.	Focuses on the liberation of the town of Averstock by the Company of the Gracious Hand.
"Skipping Town"	Legends: Stories in Honour of David Gemmell anthology (November 2013) and in Sharp Ends.	Features the couple pairing of Shevedieh (Shev) and Javre, Lioness of Hoskopp.
"Some Desperado"	Dangerous Women anthology (December 2013) and in Sharp Ends.	Features Shy South on the run during her outlaw days before Red Country.
"Tough Times All Over"	Rogues anthology (June 2014) and in Sharp Ends.	Follows courier Carcolf and the circuitous route one of her packages takes through the city of Sipani. It also features Shev and Javre.
"Small Kindnesses"	Unbound: Tales by Masters of Fantasy anthology (December 2015) and in Sharp Ends.	Features Shev.
"Two's Company"	Online on Tor.com (January 2016) and in Sharp Ends.	Features Shev and Javre, a "female Fafhrd and the Gray Mouser style thief and warrior odd couple."
"A Beautiful Bastard"	Original to Sharp Ends.	Features Sand dan Glokta.
"Hell"	Original to Sharp Ends.	Shows the fall of Dagoska through the eyes of a young acolyte.
"Wrong Place, Wrong Time"	Original to Sharp Ends.	Features Monzcarro Murcatto.
"Three's a Crowd"	Original to Sharp Ends.	Features Horald the Finger and Shevedieh.
"Made a Monster"	Original to Sharp Ends.	Features the chieftain Bethod.
"The Thread"	As an extra in the Waterstones hardcover version of A Little Hatred and in The Great Change (And Other Lies).	Follows a thread of fabric from raw material to finished product, and the lives whose hands it passes through.
"The Stone"	As an extra in the Waterstones hardcover version of The Trouble With Peace and in The Great Change (And Other Lies).	Follows a diamond from discovery to finished product, and the lives whose hands it passes through.
"The Point"	As an extra in the Waterstones hardcover version of The Wisdom Of Crowds and in The Great Change (And Other Lies).	Follows an ingot of iron from discovery to finished product, and the lives whose hands it passes through.
"The Great Change"	Original to The Great Change (And Other Lies).	Follows the creation and evolution of the Great Change.

"Tough Times All Over" won a Locus Award, and "The Fool Jobs" and "Some Desperado" received nominations.

== Book titles ==
The titles of the works derive from various sources, including real-world quotes or phrases, and in-world references.

The title of the original trilogy is a reference to a law put forth by the legendary half-Demon Euz from the series, which stated, "It is forbidden to touch the Other Side direct," the Other Side being the realm of Demons, from which magic power derives.

Series	Title	Origin or inspiration
The First Law trilogy	The Blade Itself (2006)	Taken from a quote said by Odysseus to Telemachus at the beginning of Book XIX of The Odyssey by Homer: "The blade itself incites to deeds of violence."
The First Law trilogy	Before They Are Hanged (2007)	Taken from a quote by German writer Heinrich Heine: "We should forgive our enemies, but not before they are hanged."
The First Law trilogy	Last Argument of Kings (2008)	A reference to the words that Louis XIV had inscribed on his cannons: "Ultima Ratio Regum," which is Latin for "the last argument of kings."
Standalone novels	Best Served Cold (2009)	A reference to the phrase "Revenge is a dish best served cold," which originated with the French diplomat Charles Maurice de Talleyrand-Périgord.
Standalone novels	The Heroes (2011)	A reference to an in-world monument consisting of many large, upright stones on the top of a hill, called "The Heroes", where it is said that a legendary hero of old is buried. The monument is a central part of the setting for the book.
Standalone novels	Red Country (2012)	A reference to something a character in the book says, referring to the Near and Far Country and specifically encroaching civilization. "The world out there is a red country, without justice, without meaning."
Standalone novels	The Great Leveller (2015) (omnibus release of the three standalone novels)	A reference to the proverb "death is the great leveller", meaning that everyone is equal in death.
Age of Madness trilogy	A Little Hatred (2019)	Inspired by a quote by English literary critic William Hazlitt: "Love turns, with a little indulgence, to indifference or disgust; hatred alone is immortal."
Age of Madness trilogy	The Trouble With Peace (2020)	Taken from a line of dialogue in the play Mother Courage and Her Children (1939) by German playwright Bertolt Brecht, said by a character called 'The Sergeant': "What they could do with 'round here is a good war. What else can you expect with peace running wild all over the place? You know what the trouble with peace is? No organization. And when do you get organization? In war."
Age of Madness trilogy	The Wisdom of Crowds (2021)	Taken from the title of the book The Wisdom of Crowds (2004) by American author James Surowiecki, which was itself inspired by and a reversal of Extraordinary Popular Delusions and the Madness of Crowds (1841), a study of crowd psychology by Scottish author Charles Mackay.

== Setting ==
The First Law series is set in an epic fantasy world at war, on the verge of an Industrial Revolution. Long ago, the world was inhabited by both Demons and Humans. Then hundreds or thousands of years ago, in the Old Time, Euz, a legendary half-Demon, half-Human with great magical powers, banished the Demons from the world. Magic still exists, which relies on connections to the Other Side, where the Demons live. However, Euz left behind the First Law: "It is forbidden to touch the Other Side directly."

- The Union contains the provinces of Angland, the Midderlands, Dagoska, Starikland and the city of Westport in Styria. It is a powerful kingdom reminiscent of Western and Central Europe, particularly the Holy Roman Empire.
- The Gurkish Empire is a sprawling empire to the south of the Union, similar to the large Middle-Eastern empires of antiquity.
- The North is referred to as such not only by The Union (for whom it really is to the north) but also by those who live there, who refer to themselves as Northmen.
- Styria is a large island continent to the east of the Union containing multiple warring city states and factions, resembling the rich but chaotic states of Italian Renaissance.
- The Old Empire is a former world power to the west of the Union, now reduced to a patchwork of squabbling warlords all vying for the throne.
- Far Country is a near lawless frontier region to the north of the Old Empire and west of Starikland province.

The books of the trilogy do not contain maps, as Abercrombie prefers not to use them. However, the three stand-alone novels do contain their own local maps and a World map was finally produced in full on the cover of the Sharp Ends short story collection.

== Plot overview ==
=== The First Law ===
The plot of the original trilogy involves three major powers: The Union, the Gurkish Empire, and the North, recently united under King Bethod.

There are two major theaters of war. The first takes place in the north between the Union and the Northmen, who invade the Union's northern province of Angland. The second is in the south between the Union and the Gurkish Empire, who attempt to annex the Union city of Dagoska. The trilogy centers on the fortunes of a variety of characters as they navigate through these and other conflicts. The trilogy follows the stories of six point-of-view characters, whose paths often intersect.

==== The Blade Itself ====
The first book introduces the three main characters of the trilogy and three secondary ones. Logen Ninefingers is a warrior who earned a fearsome reputation helping to bring Bethod to power in the North, but has since fallen out with him. Logen and his small crew of friends flee after being attacked by Shanka creatures. Logen is separated from his crew, and sets off on his own path. He meets Bayaz, a powerful centuries-old Magus, who enlists Logen's help in accompanying him to Adua. Sand dan Glokta leads an Inquisition investigation into a bribery case, which leads to him uncovering a wider corruption among the merchants. His superiors divert him into investigating Bayaz. Jezal, a vain young nobleman who has become a Union army officer due to his connections, trains for a prestigious swordfighting tournament. He falls in love with Ardee, the sister of his friend and superior Major Collem West, and wins the tournament with help from Bayaz. At a celebration banquet, Bayaz is challenged to prove who he is by entering the House of the Maker. The main characters of the book converge in accompanying Bayaz into the building. Bayaz retrieves an artifact and announces his plan to retrieve the Seed, a powerful magical artifact that can help him take on Khalul and the Gurkish Empire. The book also follows the journey of Logen's companions, led by Dogman, to warn Bethod about the Shanka, and Ferro, a mysterious escaped Gurkish slave, with some useful hidden powers, who travels with another Magus to find Bayaz. West is recruited to the Lord Marshall's personal staff, in preparation of the army moving out to defend Angland.

==== Before They Are Hanged ====
The book follows three distinct sets of characters as war breaks out on two fronts. In the south, Sand dan Glokta and his inquisitors attempt to repel a Gurkish invasion of the city of Dagoska, the Union's sole possession on the continent, won some decades earlier at great cost. In the North, the book follows Colonel West and the Northmen as they attempt to deal with Bethod, who intends to force the Union out of Angland, their principal northern possession. Finally, the book follows Logen, Ferro, and Jezal as they journey into the far west of their world with the sorcerer Bayaz, First of the Magi, seeking out a powerful and dangerous ancient artifact known as the Seed. The book makes it explicit that all these events are interconnected and part of the greater machinations of a sorcerer called Khalul, Second of the Magi and one of Bayaz's enemies. Khalul has raised a great army of slaves and Eaters (cannibalistic transformed humanoids with enhanced durability and magical abilities), and has indirectly given Bethod an alliance with the Flatheads, orc-like creatures created as weapons in an ancient war, as well as a man known as the Feared, who is supernaturally all but immune to damage. The story ends on a low note for all groups involved: Dagoska is lost to the Gurkish; an intrigue sees both heirs to the throne killed and an innocent man is blamed for political reasons; the quest for the Seed is an abject failure; and Bethod remains at large in the North; Ferro and Logen's burgeoning relationship ends abruptly as both are incapable of making it last.

==== Last Argument of Kings ====
After returning from the west, Jezal is revealed to be a bastard son of the deceased king and his identity was hidden by Bayaz. Bayaz’s manipulation sees Jezal elected as new king of the Union. Logen returns to the North, kills Bethod and becomes the new king. Bayaz goes to the house of the Maker, and succeeds in unlocking the power of the Seed (which is found in the house). Meanwhile, the Gurkish have invaded the Union and have reached Adua. Logen sets out to aid the Union and a treaty is forged between the Union and the North. During the battle, Bayaz destroys large parts of the Gurkish army, together with the city of Adua itself, while using the power of the seed. His rampage is only ended when Ferro manages to contain the seed and, in the end, the battle is won. At the end of the book, Glokta, now the Arch Lector, is installed as Bayaz's proxy in the Closed council, while Jezal's role as king is revealed to be merely Bayaz's puppet. Ferro, granted fresh powers by her exposure to the seed, returns to the south to kill the emperor. Logen returns to the North, but is betrayed by Black Dow who becomes king.

=== Standalone books ===
The three standalone books are set in the same world as the trilogy. Some of the major characters are minor characters from the original trilogy while several major characters from the trilogy sometimes also appear in smaller roles, cameos or are mentioned in passing.

This set of novels is sometimes marketed under the name World of the First Law, and has also been released as a combined, omnibus volume with the title The Great Leveller.

==== Best Served Cold ====
The first of three stand-alone books following the original trilogy, this book follows mercenary Monzcarro “Monza” Murcatto on her quest for revenge after a deadly betrayal. The book introduces new characters from the world of the First Law and features multiple known characters from the original trilogy, including Caul Shivers, Shylo Vitari and Nicomo Cosca.

Monza Murcatto is a mercenary commander in the services of the Grand Duke Orso, previously mentioned in Last Argument of Kings as the father-in-law to the King of the Union, Jezal dan Luthar. After another successful battle to unite Styria under the rule of Orso, Monza and her brother Benna, who is also her second-in-command, are summoned to the palace of the Grand Duke in Talins. There she has to witness the murder of her brother at the hands of the Grand Duke and his men who suspect the siblings of planning to overthrow Orso. She herself is severely injured and thrown off the balcony to fall down the side of a mountain but miraculously survives. The rest of the book is divided into seven parts, one for each person involved in her brother’s murder. These are Gobba, the Grand Duke’s bodyguard, Mauthis, a representative of the banking clan Valint and Balk, General Ganmark, leader of Orso’s army, a senior captain of Monza’s mercenary company named Faithful Carpi, the Grand Duke himself and his two sons, Prince Ario and Count Foscar. Each part opens with a short episode from Monza’s past detailing her and her brother’s way from children on a farm to leaders of the mercenary company in Grand Duke Orso’s service.

In the first part, Monza is found barely alive by a mysterious stranger. He performs various surgical procedures on her to mend her many fractures and wounds. For the pain he gives her a smoke pipe with a highly addictive substance called husk which she becomes more and more addicted to over the course of the book. After regaining her strength, she escapes the stranger’s hut and seeks out a hideout that she and Benna had prepared. With the weapons and money stored there she returns to Talins to start her quest for revenge. She enlists the help of Caul Shivers, a Northman who just recently arrived in Styria to become a better person, and an ex-convict called Friendly. Together they abduct and kill Gobba.

The second part takes place in Westport where Mauthis works for the banking house of Valint and Balk. Monza hires the master poisoner Castor Morveer and his assistant Day to help them in the coming assassination plots. At night they break into the bank and poison all ledgers to kill Mauthis.

The third part takes place in Sipani where King Jezal of the Union has arranged a peace conference between the warring factions in Styria. Prince Ario and Count Foscar participate on behalf of their father and are expected to visit a brothel, Cardotti’s House of Leisure, in the evening. Monzas crew of assassins which is joined by Nicomo Cosca and Shylo Vitari set a trap for them there. Unfortunately, Ario brings his brother-in-law King Jezal along with a considerable number of his King’s Guards instead of Count Foscar. The plan to intimidate and control all guests while murdering only Orso’s sons is thus thwarted. Instead, a bloody fight breaks out between Ario’s and Jezal’s men on one side and Monza’s crew and their hired muscle on the other. Monza convinces Jezal to smoke husk which makes him pass out while she, due to her growing addiction and adaptation to it, is only numbed and disoriented. She manages to locate Ario in the chaos that has broken out in the meanwhile. She stabs him the same way he had stabbed her brother and throws him from the balcony. Weakened from the husk she is rescued by Shivers from the flames that have engulfed Cardotti’s.

The fourth part takes place in the city of Visserine which is soon to be besieged by Orso’s army led by General Ganmark. Monza’s crew intentionally enters the city before the siege. They expect General Ganmark to swiftly seek out the immense art gallery of the Duke Salier of Visserine after the city is breached. They plan to disguise themselves as soldiers of his army and attack him there. Monza and Shivers are suspected to be spies and taken prisoner by Duke Salier’s guards. In their prison cell they are tortured, and Shivers has one eye burned out while Monza is saved by the arrival of Duke Salier and Nicomo Cosca. From this point on Shivers greatly resents Monza for his mutilation, claiming it should have been her instead, and takes a sharp turn from wanting to become a better person to being a cold-blooded killer. The planned trap for General Ganmark however works as planned and Monza engages him in a sword duel. Cosca comes to her aid but is mortally wounded by Ganmark. Ganmark is about to kill Monza as well when suddenly a damaged statue collapses on top of him. Together with her crew Monza narrowly escapes Ganmark’s oncoming forces, leaving behind a seemingly dying Nicomo Cosca. Meanwhile in Talins Orso hires several assassins to find and kill Monza Murcatto and all who have helped her. He has found out that she is still alive because of the similarities between Prince Ario’s and Benna Murcatto’s death. Among the assassins is a man named Shenkt, an Eater with supernatural speed and strength.

The fifth part takes place in Puranti where Monza meets Duke Rogont, the last duke in Styria to stand against Orso. She persuades him to lend her troops to trap and kill Faithful Carpi. In return she promises to bring him the support of her former mercenary company after she retakes control from Carpi. The plan to kill Carpi works, however Nicomo Cosca surprisingly shows up and takes control of the mercenaries. He had been taken in Visserine by the Talinese army as one of their own and taken to a hospital where he made a full recovery. During the battle with Carpi Castor Morveer poisons his apprentice and flees, abandoning Monza to ally himself with Grand Duke Orso instead.

The sixth part takes place in Ospria, the dukedom of Duke Rogont. With nowhere else to retreat to in Styria, Rogont makes a last stand against the combined forces of the Talinese army now led by Count Foscar and the mercenary company led by Nicomo Cosca. However, Cosca does not join the battle as he has been bribed by a Gurkish agent. The Talinese army is defeated and Foscar captured. Monza, grown increasingly weary of her quest for revenge, cannot bring herself to kill Foscar but Shivers, turning more and more into a cold-blooded killer, smashes his skull in.

The seventh part takes place back in Talins, where Rogont names Monza the Grand Duchess of Talins and plans to crown himself King of Styria. Morveer, now in Orso’s service, poisons the crown which kills all remaining Styrian rulers and Rogont. Monza survives because she is protected by the glove she now always wears over her crippled right hand. Orso has retreated into his fortress. Monza enters the fortress with Shivers and Friendly at her side. Shivers betrays and tries to kill her but Friendly engages him in single combat while Monza continues to advance on Orso. In Orso’s throne room a standoff between Monza and Orso and his guards ensues. It is revealed that Benna had indeed planned to overthrow Orso and to put Monza in his place unbeknownst to her. Shenkt enters the throne room but does not kill Monza as Orso orders and instead kills Orso’s guards. It was Shenkt who found and nursed Monza back to health to use her against the Grand Duke. Monza then kills Orso and becomes Grand Duchess of Talins.

In the aftermath Monza is approached by representatives of both Bayaz and Khalul but with Shenkt’s support she refuses their offers and opts to remain neutral. She notices that she is pregnant either by Shivers or by Rogont. Shivers is initially imprisoned but then allowed to go free and return to the North.

==== The Heroes ====
This book focuses on a three-day battle set in the same world as the First Law trilogy, about seven years after events of the original trilogy. Union commander Lord Marshal Kroy leads the Union forces against the much smaller Northern army led by Black Dow. The story features many characters seen in previous First Law novels such as Bremer dan Gorst, Lord Marshal Kroy, and the Dogman.

The book is divided into five parts which depict the preparations for the battle, the three days of battle respectively and the days and weeks after the battle. The story is narrated from the point of view of several different characters of which three can be considered the main characters.
Curnden Craw is a seasoned veteran in Black Dow’s army and chief to a crew of warriors. After many years of fighting, he is only interested in keeping the members of his crew alive and doing the right thing, which he both finds increasingly difficult in the chaos of the battle.
“Prince” Calder is the younger son of the late King Bethod. He is generally trying to avoid battle and even suggesting peace with the Union. He is scheming and plotting to take Black Dow’s place which is made difficult by the fact that Black Dow holds Calder’s pregnant wife hostage, Calder is generally hated by the other Northmen and has almost no allies except for Curnden Craw and his father-in-law Caul Reachey.
Colonel Bremer dan Gorst is an officer in the Union army. He has been demoted from his position as the King’s First Guard after the events at Cardotti’s House of Leisure in Best Served Cold to Royal Observer of the war in the North.

The battle takes place in the valley of Osrung which holds no military significance for either side. There are three key positions over which the battle is fought, the small town of Osrung itself in the east, a steep hill in the centre on which a stonehenge-like structure, the eponymous “Heroes” reside, and a bridge over the river to the west.

In the first part Craw is ordered by Black Dow to take the Heroes from the Union’s scouts and hold it as a vantage point until the Union army arrives in force. At the same time Dow summons Calder from exile in the hopes that he will be killed during the coming battle. Lord Marshal Kroy is ordered by the Magus Bayaz to concentrate his army which is scattered across the North and to engage Black Dow in a single decisive battle. The war in the North has gone on too long, emptied the royal treasury too far and Kroy’s army is needed in other theaters of war the Union is engaged in.

On the first day of battle the Union arrives in the valley of Osrung and quickly takes control of the three key positions with Craw’s crew retreating to the rest of Dow’s army that is hiding in the thick forest north of the valley. However, the main part of the Union’s army is still held up by the difficult terrain on their way to the valley. From their hidden position Dow’s army stages a surprise attack on all three positions and recaptures all of them as the Union army is stretched too thin. The advance of Dow’s army is only stopped when Bremer dan Gorst leads a desperate cavalry charge in the centre. At the end of the first day both armies are firmly settled to the north and to the south of the river that is dividing the valley of Osrung.

On the second day the Union attacks Osrung in the east and the bridge in the west with full force. They manage to completely take Osrung until they are driven out of the northern half, but can hold onto the southern half of the town. In the west several efforts to take the bridge and establish a foothold on the northern banks of the river fail until Bremer dan Gorst again throws himself into the fighting. He singlehandedly breaks the deadlock and takes the bridge for the Union, seemingly killing Calder’s brother in the process. Meanwhile behind the lines a raiding party of unaffiliated Northmen attacks the Union’s headquarters, kill the officers and take Finree dan Brock captive, the Lord Marshal’s daughter. Finree is freed by Black Dow and sent back to her father with an offer of peace. The peace offer is dismissed by Bayaz who insists on continuing fighting.

On the third day the Union presses on at all three key positions. In the centre the Union suffers heavy losses while advancing on the Heroes. They nearly retake them but are ultimately driven off. In the east the Union retakes the whole of Osrung until a Gurkish agent and Eater causes a huge explosion that stops the advance there. In the west Calder is in charge after the apparent death of his older brother. Through clever traps and ruses, he manages to hold off the Union’s advance for some time. Lord Marshal Kroy sees the carnage and devastation and decides to finally take the peace that Black Dow had offered the previous day. The fighting stops and both armies retreat.

After the battle Dow finds out about Calder’s plots to kill him and intends to execute him. Calder instead challenges Dow to a duel. Calder is clearly inferior in the duel and about to be killed when Dow is killed by Caul Shivers whom Dow had insulted too many times. Calder’s brother is revealed to have survived the assault on the bridge and is declared the new king of the Northmen with Calder pulling the strings while he himself is under Bayaz’ control. Finree dan Brock, who for the whole novel has tried to advance her husband’s position, convinces Bayaz to appoint her husband Lord Governor of Angland. Bremer dan Gorst is reinstated as the King’s First Guard. Craw shortly retires from fighting but is seen returning at the first opportunity.

==== Red Country ====
The last of the three is set about thirteen years after the First Law trilogy and takes place in the Far Country, a frontier-like setting located to the west of the Union. It follows a young woman named Shy South and Logen Ninefingers who has settled down in the Far Country under the name Lamb. After their farm is attacked in their absence and Shy's younger siblings are abducted, they follow the kidnappers across the Far Country. At the same time Nicomo Cosca, last seen in Best Served Cold, has been hired by the Inquisition of the Union to track down any rebels from Starikland that might be hiding in the Far Country. These two groups meet in the finale of the book. Together they attack the so-called Dragon People, a group of indigenous people who live high in the mountains of a remote part of the Far Country. They had ordered the abduction of Shy's siblings and other children because their environment renders them sterile and thus they rely on abducted children for their continued existence. The children are freed successfully and Shy, her siblings and Logen return home. However, Caul Shivers turns up, who still has been trying to track down Logen to exact revenge. Although Caul does not follow through on his revenge plan and returns back to the North, Logen decides it will be safer for Shy and her family if he leaves them because he cannot guarantee that other enemies from his past will not come looking for him.

=== The Age of Madness ===
The Age of Madness takes place 15 years after the end of Red Country. The Union has begun to see rapid changes with the onset of an industrial revolution.

==== A Little Hatred ====
Takes place 15 years after the end of Red Country. The Union has entered early industrial age, and the North is invading Angland again. New characters are introduced, crown prince Orso (son of King Jezal and Queen Terez) and Savine dan Glokta (daughter of Sand dan Glokta and Ardee West). Angland is inherited to Leo dan Brock, the young and reckless son of Finree dan Brock and her late husband, and in the protectorate of Uffrith, Dogman's daughter Rikke has the Long Eye, the ability (or curse) to see the future. There is public discontent in the Union, aimed against the Banks and social structures, led by factions called the Burners and the Breakers. In the South there is a rumour that the prophet Khalul has been killed by a demon, and there is a civil war.
In the north, Stour Nightfall, son of Black Calder and nephew to King Scale Ironhand, leads the invasion of Uffrith and Angland.

==== The Trouble With Peace ====
King Jezal dies and is succeeded by crown prince Orso, with whom Savine had an affair, which she broke after finding out he was her half brother. After marrying to Leo dan Brock, the couple starts to plot rebellion against the crown, with the help of the North, which fails nevertheless. Rikke regains control of her Long Eye, and in the mist of Northern attack on Adua, she betrays Leo and claims the North.
Leo is saved from the hanging by Savine's confession to Orso that they found out they were siblings, and even though Leo's rebellion failed, a new one is ready to succeed, armed with Angland's weapons.

==== The Wisdom of Crowds ====
Revolution is swift and new change is taking place in the Union. The first ones to go are the banks of Master Bayaz. Savine dan Glokta manages to became popular hero and mother of the nation, after her fight with rebel leaders, and her husband manages to gather enough forces to take over the government. After finding out that Savine and king Orso are related, he manages to throw off king, and proclaim his new born son (Savine had twins) as new one. Ex king Orso is hanged, which causes further tensions between him and his wife. New order is being established. At the North Rikke manages to beat Calder and becomes undisputed ruler of the North.
At the end it is shown that the real master-planner of the failed rebellion is Savine's father, Glokta. He wanted to rid the Union of Bayaz's influence. And in the words of his daughter, he put half of the world at fire so he could rule the other half. Bayaz banks are no more, and with them goes his control of the Union.

=== The Great Change (And Other Lies) ===
A collection of 4 short stories going through industries as they evolved within the Union's equivalent of an industrial revolution.

“The Thread” follows the thread, from the ex-slaves working in the fields of Gurkhul, through the mills of Adua and the overworked seamstresses, to a dress that’s unsatisfactory for the leader of fashionm Lady Savine dan Glokta. “The Stone” follows one rock from the rivers of the parched south through the smugglers, spivs, merchants, and jewellers of the diamond trade each taking their cut, and ends with the stone that so many have deemed not being good enough for the King of the Union’s new crown. “The Point,” meanwhile, digs iron from the penal mines of Angland, forges that iron into a dagger, and the dagger, by a circuitous route, finds its way into the hands of a member of the Burners. “The Great Change” is an idea of a grand revolution, suggesting a great change.

== Major characters ==
- Logen Ninefingers, infamous barbarian warrior of the North named for his missing finger. Nicknamed the "Bloody-Nine" after losing a finger in battle during a berserker-rage, he strives to turn from the path of senseless violence he has followed for so long.
- Sand dan Glokta, a dashing young swordsman before his capture and years of torture by the Gurkish. Now crippled, he has become a torturer himself in the Union's Inquisition.
- Jezal dan Luthar, a self-centred, immature nobleman and swordsman training reluctantly for the greatest tournament in the nation.
- Bayaz, First of the Magi, a wizard from an older time, his magical skill is only outstripped by his political savvy.
- Collem West, a common born officer of the Union army. Intelligent and diligent but quick to anger and worried for his younger sister.
- Dogman, a loyal member of Logen's band, a skilled scout with sharpened teeth and an incredible sense of smell.
- Ferro Maljinn, an escaped slave from the south who puts her thirst for revenge over all else. She is part devil.

=== Other characters ===
Magi

- Khalul, a Magus who is the religious leader of Gurkhul, he has created an army of Eaters and is Bayaz's bitter enemy.
- Malacus Quai, Bayaz's apprentice who grows disillusioned with his master.
- Yoru Sulfur, an odd man with Heterochromia iridum, he was Bayaz’s old apprentice. It is later revealed that he is an Eater, although he is still loyal to Bayaz.

Northmen

- Bethod, a charismatic and ruthless leader. An excellent military tactician who intends to conquer Angland after he has defeated almost every clan in the North. He is Logen's bitter enemy after he betrayed him and his band of men. He has two nasty sons, Calder and Scale.
- Black Dow, a sharp-tongued member of Logen's band who is famed for his ruthlessness.
- Caul Shivers, an amicable Northman who carries a bitter need for vengeance.
- Jonas Clover, once known as Jonas Steepfield and reckoned a famous warrior in The North, he is now renowned as a sardonic do-nothing.

== Reception ==
The Blade Itself was released to positive reviews. Writing for The Guardian, author Jon Courtenay Grimwood said, "for once, the novel comes close to living up to its publisher's hype", and Strange Horizons's Siobhan Carroll said that "fans of character-driven epics who are willing to take their heroes with a grain of moral ambiguity should add this novel to their 'must read' list."

Reviews for Before They Are Hanged were also positive; Fantasy Book Review stated that it was "hard not to try and read it in one sitting" and that it "does not disappoint". Best Fantasy Reviews said it was "an excellent book, and accomplishes a fairly rare feat – the middle book of a trilogy that does a hell of a lot more than provide a stop gap between the beginning and the end."

Last Argument of Kings was well received by critics, with Publishers Weekly saying that "readers will mourn the end of this vivid story arc." SFX's David Bradley gave the book a five star review and stated that Abercrombie "signs off the trilogy on a high, interspersing breathless skirmishes with thriller-like moments."

Eric Brown reviewed Red Country for The Guardian and said that Abercrombie was "tipping his hat to the Western genre but continuing his mission to drag fantasy, kicking and screaming, into the 21st century with his characteristic mix of gritty realism, complex characterisation, set-piece scenes of stomach-churning violence and villains who are as fully rounded as his flawed heroes" and concluded that the book was "a marvellous follow-up to his highly praised The Heroes."
