= Shattered Sea =

Novel series by Joe Abercrombie

- First editions (UK hardback)
- Half a King; Half the World; Half a War
- Author: Joe Abercrombie
- Country: United Kingdom
- Language: English
- Genre: Fantasy
- Publisher: Harper Voyager (UK); Del Rey (US)
- Published: 2014 – 2015
- Media type: Print

Shattered Sea is a young adult fantasy series written by the British author Joe Abercrombie. The trilogy was published by Del Rey in the United States and Harper Voyager in the UK.

== Novels ==
The trilogy
#	Title	Pages	UK release	UK hardback ISBN
1	Half a King	384	3 July 2014	ISBN 978-0007550203
2	Half the World	496	15 February 2015	ISBN 978-0007550234
3	Half a War	512	16 July 2015	ISBN 978-0007550265

== Plot ==
=== Half a King ===
The Shattered Sea is a loose confederacy of nations, with the most prominent being Gettland, Vansterland and Throvenland. Each country is ruled by a Low King—but all kneel to the High King, who rules from the island of Skekenhouse. The current High King is old and senile, and the real power in the land is his minister, Grandmother Wexen. The religion of the Shattered Sea speaks of One God that was torn apart by the elves into many different deities. In the Empire of the South it is believed that the God was not destroyed. The High King has abandoned the many gods in order to worship the One. The Elves are said to have been destroyed in the process of breaking God, leaving behind highly-advanced ruins which cause deadly illness for all who enter.

King Uthrik of Gettland and his eldest son are killed by soldiers from neighboring Vansterland. His surviving son, Prince Yarvi, is reluctantly declared the new king, despite having trained to join the Ministry under the tutelage of Mother Gundring, who practically raised him. Yarvi was born with a malformed hand, and is considered to be a weak ruler by many, even his father. His mother Laithlin, or "The Golden Queen," is a brilliant economist; many believe that she would be the true power behind the throne. Yarvi is betrothed to Isriun, his cousin and the fiancée of his dead brother, to shore up his political position. Her father, Odem—Yarvi's uncle and Uthrik's younger brother—is one of the few members of his family that has always liked Yarvi. Yarvi swears an oath to the Gods to avenge his father and brother and to kill their murderer, the king Grom-gil-Gorm of Vansterland. While on a raid at the Vansterland village of Amwend, Odem betrays Yarvi and frames his own murder, unwilling to have Gettland ruled by a cripple. Yarvi escapes assassination by Odem’s conspirators, but is captured by Vanstermen led by Gorm. After he gives a false identity, he is taken as a slave to their capital city Vulsgard.

Yarvi is sold to the slave galley South Wind as an oarsman, despite his crippled hand. Trigg, the second in-command, and the store-keeper Ankran steal money from the captain. Yarvi, wanting to escape, betrays them to the captain. Ankran is beaten and Yarvi takes his place, although he feels guilty for Ankran, since it was revealed that the man stole the money to save his wife and son, who are being held as slaves in Gettland. When captain Ebdel Aric Shadikshirram leaves the ship, Yarvi and Sumael, the ship's navigator, plan to escape, but Trigg attempts to kill Yarvi. His friends rush to his aid and "Nothing," a ferocious slave and former fighter, kills Trigg. The South Wind is sunk in the process. Those who accompany Yarvi and escape to land include Nothing, Sumael; Rulf and Jaud, Yarvi's oar mates; and Ankran. Together, they slowly travel back to Gettland. Yarvi reveals his identity to the group and Nothing, a fellow Gettlander, vows to help the rightful king of Gettland reclaim the throne. Shadikshirram and her surviving sailors pursue them; Yarvi's group leads them into an ambush in an elf-ruin. In the ensuing fight, Yarvi manages to kill Shadikshirram in combat, though Ankran is also killed. As they are recovering from the fight, Yarvi and his surviving companions are captured by Vanstermen. Meeting with King Grom-gil-Gorm of Vansterland, Yarvi reveals his identity and promises to make Gettland a vassal state of Vansterland in exchange for passage home. Yarvi devises a plan for Gorm and his army to draw Odem's forces into the open, while they infiltrate the palace.

Returning to Gettland's capital Thorlby, Odem attempts to get rid of Leithlin by marrying her to the High King, but she stalls. Yarvi reunites with Laithlin and reveals his plan; she further uses her connections and wealth to assemble a motley force of mercenaries. Once the majority of Odem's army has left the palace to confront Gorm, Yarvi and his companions ambush the remaining forces, cornering Odem in the throne room. Jaud is killed during the fighting by Laithlin's treacherous bodyguard. Nothing is revealed to be Uthil, Odem and Uthrik's older brother, who had previously been captured by slavers after having been betrayed by his brothers. Uthil and Odem duel for the throne, after which Yarvi kills a defeated Odem for trying to covertly murder Uthil. Yarvi gives up his claim to the throne in exchange for forgiveness for his earlier actions; Uthil is crowned king in his stead, and Laithlin agrees to marry Uthil since he was her original suitor before his disappearance. Yarvi frees Ankran's wife, Safrit, and son, Koll, from a slaver. Meanwhile, Isriun swears revenge against Yarvi and the whole of Gettland.

Yarvi realizes that Mother Gundring and Odem had conspired with the High King and Grandmother Wexen. The High King feared that Laithlin’s economic policies would take away his wealth. Therefore, Grandmother Wexen plotted to have Uthrik murdered, and to marry Laithlin to the High King, while also turning her mint into a temple for the One God, thus converting Gettland to the southern faith. Yarvi poisons Mother Gundring in revenge and takes her place as minister to King Uthil, planning to destroy Grandmother Wexen and the High King.

=== Half the World ===
Years later, Hild "Thorn" Bathu hopes to become the first female warrior of Gettland in living memory; also wanting to follow in her legendary father's footsteps, who was killed in battle by Grom-gil-Gorm. During a training exercise, she accidentally kills a fellow trainee and is named a murderer, sentenced to soon be executed. Brand, another young trainee warrior, intercedes on her behalf to Father Yarvi. Yarvi pardons Thorn, and she accompanies him to meet the High King. Brand is punished by the royal training master for saving Thorn by being held back from joining King Uthil's raid. At the High King's capital of Skekenhouse, Grandmother Wexen and Yarvi spar verbally during their meeting; Isriun is also there, having become a minister. Yarvi and his companions stay in neighbouring Throvenland on their path back to Gettland, but an assassin is discovered in the night attempting to poison their water supply, paid with Skekenhouse coins and revealing the High King's treachery. Outraged, King Fynn of Throvenland pledges his support and joins an alliance with Gettland.

Yarvi travels with Brand, Thorn, Rulf, Safrit, Koll and a band of warriors to seek out other allies for Gettland in the political conflict with the High King and Grandmother Wexen. Thorn is trained in combat by another crew member named Skifr, a woman who steals elf-relics for a living. For several months, the crew journeys through harsh conditions to reach the Empire of the South, a powerful kingdom far from Gettland that could be a strong ally. Along the way, Brand single-handedly saves their ship from falling down a mountain after portaging it, and Skifr uses a powerful elf-relic weapon to easily wipe out nomads attacking them. As Thorn and Brand journey across the world, their mutual dislike slowly grows into friendship. The friendship beings to blossom into romance, but a misunderstanding over a gift for Brand's sister shatters any further development.

The crew finally reaches and enters the First of Cities, only to find that its empress has died and the city is in the midst of a succession crisis. Yarvi's attempts to meet with the new empress Vialine are impeded by Mother Scaer, an agent sent by Grandmother Wexen, though he reunites with Sumael, who has become one of Vialine's advisors and arranges an audience. Thorn becomes acquainted with Vialine and inspires her to break free from her uncle Duke Mikedas' manipulation, causing the Duke to lead an assassination attempt on her, which Thorn (with last-minute help from Brand) manages to stop, killing the Duke in the process. Thankful, Vialine forms an alliance between the Empire and Gettland, while Yarvi persuades Mother Scaer to also help him with allying Vansterland.

Upon returning home, the crew discovers Gettland and Vansterland on the brink of war. Brand’s sister Rin confronts Thorn over the gift falling out, making her realise her mistake; she reconciles with Brand and the two make love. Thorn is named as Queen Laithlin's chosen shield. Brand joins a Gettland raid on a Vansterland village, but is disturbed by the callous murder of civilians, releasing his only captive and losing his place as a warrior for the second time.

Under orders from his minister Mother Isriun, King Grom-gil-Gorm challenges Uthil to single combat. Despite being poisoned and in poor health, Uthil accepts. Yarvi tries to avert war, as even a victory will weaken Gettland substantially and make it an easy target for the High King's forces. With Uthil too sick to fight, Laithlin chooses Thorn to fight in his place, which she accepts given the opportunity for revenge against Gorm for killing her father. In the bloody ensuing duel, the far-stronger Gorm manages to barely defeat her, but he hesitates from finishing her when Isriun orders him to kill her in the High King's name. Frustrated with following the High King's orders, Gorm decides to spare Thorn and defies Grandmother Wexen, forging an alliance with Gettland and selling Isriun into slavery.

Brand learns that Yarvi poisoned Uthil in order to manipulate the duel between Grom and Thorn. Yarvi administers the antidote to Uthil, who recovers. Thorn begins training girls for war with the High King.

=== Half a War ===
Bright Yilling, the champion of Grandmother Wexen, conquers Throvenland and kills King Fynn, an ally to Uthil and Grom. King Fynn's granddaughter Skara escapes to Gettland. She pleads with Uthil and Grom to retake Bail's Point, a strategic fortress in Throvenland. Grom lends his swordbearer Raith to Skara as a servant, hoping to plant a spy in her court. Unplanned, they start to fall in love.

The alliance between Throvenland, Gettland, and Vansterland succeeds in retaking Bail's Point. Grom proposes marriage to Skara and she accepts for political reasons. Father Yarvi and his apprentice Koll reunite with Skifr, who tells them that Grandmother Wexen killed her family. Koll is torn between his desire to become a minister and his relationship with Brand's sister Rin. In Bail's Point, Bright Yilling kills Uthil in a duel and reveals that there is a traitor from Gettland who feeds him informations.

Yilling's forces sack Thorlby, Gettland's capital, and kill Brand. Father Yarvi, Koll, and Skifr enter the forbidden elf-city of Strokom and steal weapons. With elf-weapons, they kill Bright Yilling and defeat his army. Before he dies, Yilling reveals to Skara the traitor's name. Gettland's and Vansterland's army conquer Skekenhouse, the High King's capital. Father Yarvi kills Grandmother Wexen, finally fulfilling his oath. The High King is found dead, and Grom is set to replace him as the new High King. Raith poisons Grom-gil-Gorm, who dies before marrying Skara and ascending the throne.

Despite being in love with him, Skara breaks up with Raith and secretly aborts their unborn baby. Raith leaves with Thorn for the Empire of the South. Yarvi, now the head of the ministry, attempts to annex Throvenland and marry Skara to his younger half-brother. Skara rebuffs him, and it is revealed that Yarvi was the traitor. (He betrayed the alliance in order to ensure that Gettland would never sue for peace and threaten his desire for vengeance against the High King and Grandmother Wexen.) Skara blackmails Yarvi and asserts Throvenland's independence. Yarvi is left powerful but guilt-ridden. Koll abandons Yarvi and the ministry, choosing to stay with Rin in Queen Skara's service.

== Setting ==
The map of the Shattered Sea tallies closely with that of the current day Baltic Sea, the main three countries of the book, Gettland, Vansterland and Throvenland seem to make up most of what is a modern-day Sweden.

== Reception ==
Book 1

Ryan Lawler and Jo Fitzpatrick of Fantasy Book Review both gave the novel a rating of 9.5/10. Lawler notes that "this is not just a story for teenagers" despite being marketed as young adult literature. Fitzpatrick praised Yarvi's character development from a "weakling" into a strong leader.

Book 2

Publishers Weekly called the novel "a splendid second installment" and wrote that Abercrombie "has a knack for building characters with pathos and wit."

Book 3

Luke Brown of SFF World wrote that the final novel in the trilogy is "the book in the trilogy most like previous Abercrombie novels." Brown wrote that "I enjoyed it immensely" while still feeling that it was weaker than the previous two installments and somewhat predictable.
