= The Great Silence (disambiguation) =

The Great Silence is a 1968 an Italian-French Spaghetti Western directed and co-written by Sergio Corbucci.

The Great Silence may also refer to:

- The Great Silence: Science and Philosophy of Fermi's Paradox, a 2018 book by Milan M. Ćirković
- "The Great Silence" (short story), a 2015 short story by Ted Chiang
- Fermi paradox or the Great Silence, the seemingly paradoxical absence of evidence for extraterrestrial intelligence, named after Enrico Fermi
