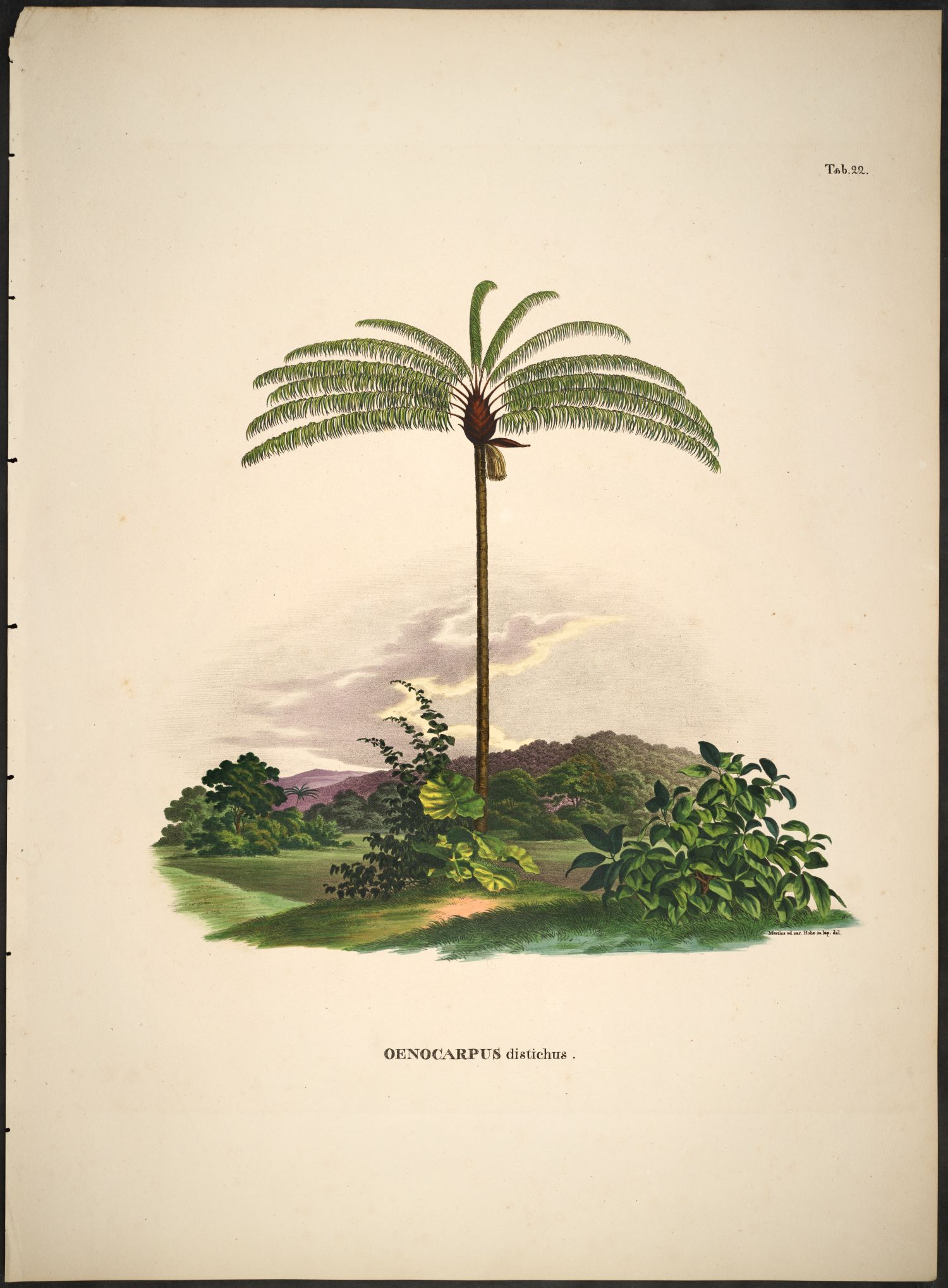

Scientific classification
- Kingdom: Plantae
- Clade: Tracheophytes
- Clade: Angiosperms
- Clade: Monocots
- Clade: Commelinids
- Order: Arecales
- Family: Arecaceae
- Genus: Oenocarpus
- Species: O. distichus

Binomial name
- Oenocarpus distichus Mart.

= Oenocarpus distichus =

Species of plant

Oenocarpus distichus is a species of palm, commonly occurring in the southeast of the Amazonia. It is distinguished from the turu palm by the appearance of its opposite leaves.

== Uses ==
In Brazil, the palm has been used by indigenous people since ancient times. A thick wine is prepared with the kneaded mesocarp juice, highly appreciated locally. The pulp of the fruits contains 25% oil (10% of the weight of the whole fruit) and produces a light yellow oil.
