= Anxiety Is the Dizziness of Freedom =

Short story by Ted Chiang

- Short story by Ted Chiang
- Language: English
- Genre: Science fiction

Publication
- Published in: Exhalation: Stories
- Publication type: Book
- Publication date: 7 May 2019

"Anxiety Is the Dizziness of Freedom" is a science fiction novella by American writer Ted Chiang, initially published in the 2019 collection Exhalation: Stories. The novella's name quotes a proverb by Danish philosopher Søren Kierkegaard (1813–1855) in his work The Concept of Anxiety (1844). An abridged version of the novella was also published under the title "Better Versions of You" in the literary supplement to The New York Times.

== Plot summary ==
In the near future, quantum mechanics and computer technology have discovered parallel realities, and a device has been invented which will create parallel realities according to the many-worlds interpretation of quantum mechanics. These devices make a single quantum measurement, which can be one of either of two quantum states, and then displays either a red or a blue light based on that measurement result. This creates two different timelines, initially identical (except for the color of the lights), but which diverge as time progresses due to the butterfly effect of chaos theory. The device also allows communication between those two parallel timelines (but only those two timelines, not others), allowing the user to see what would have been different (for example, if they had decided to choose a particular choice depending on whether a red or blue light was shown). The ability to learn about alternate timelines causes existential crises for many people: “Many worried that their choices were rendered meaningless because every action they took was counterbalanced by a branch in which they had made the opposite choice.”

The story is narrated from the view of two women: Nat, who works in a shop selling "parallel reality" access devices, and Dana, a psychologist who treats people struggling with this new technology. Nat is engaged in a confidence game: she is attending group therapy sessions given by psychologist Dana, with a hidden motive of trying to convince another participant in the sessions to sell his device, which she and her collaborator believe could be valuable.

== Background ==
Chiang revealed in the story notes at the end of Exhalation: Stories that he is "agnostic" about the many-worlds interpretation and argued:

I’m pretty confident that even if the many-worlds interpretation is correct, it doesn’t mean that all of our decisions are canceled out. If we say that an individual’s character is revealed by the choices they make over time, then, in a similar fashion, an individual’s character would also be revealed by the choices they make across many worlds.

== Reception ==
=== Reviews ===
Tobias Carroll wrote in the Reactor Magazine, that the novella is "about flawed characters making bad decisions and trying to make better ones" as well as that the "central concept is staggering in its implications, but its central characters also feel deeply singular—even when the point of the story involves multiple variations on them." All of this "offers shocks and empathy both; like the prisms within it, it contains far more than you might think."

=== Awards ===
| Result | Year and Award | Category |
|---|---|---|
| Nomination | 2020 Locus Award | Best Novella |
| Nomination | 2020 Hugo Award | Best Novella |
| Nomination | 2019 Nebula Award | Novella |

== See also ==
- Alternate history
- Many-worlds interpretation
- Everett phone
