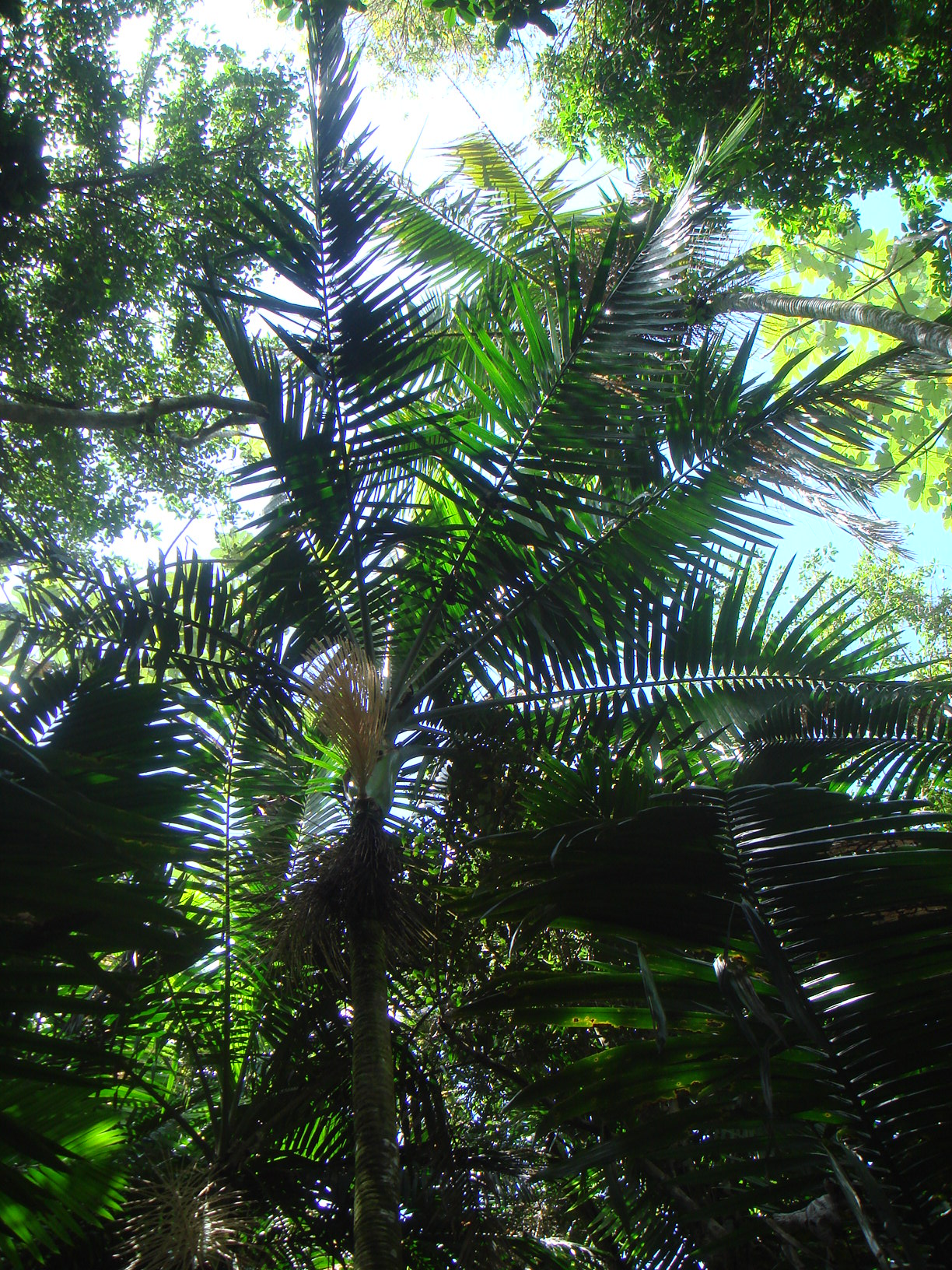

Scientific classification
- Kingdom: Plantae
- Clade: Tracheophytes
- Clade: Angiosperms
- Clade: Monocots
- Clade: Commelinids
- Order: Arecales
- Family: Arecaceae
- Genus: Prestoea
- Species: P. acuminata
- Variety: P. a. var. montana

Trinomial name
- Prestoea acuminata var. montana (Graham) A.J.Hend. & Galeano

Synonyms
- Euterpe antioquensis Schaedtler; Euterpe montana Graham; Prestoea acuminata subsp. montana (Graham) Greuter & R.Rankin; Prestoea montana (Graham) Hook.f.; Acrista monticola O.F.Cook; Euterpe globosa Gaertn.; Euterpe manaele (Mart.) Griseb. & H.Wendl.; Euterpe pertenuis L.H.Bailey; Euterpe tobagonis L.H.Bailey; Oreodoxa manaele Mart.

= Prestoea acuminata var. montana =

Species of palm

Prestoea acuminata var. montana (vernacular English: Sierran palm; vernacular Spanish: palma de sierra) is a perennial palm in the family Arecaceae.

== Description ==
A palm with a thin and tall stipe and a uniform diameter, reaching heights of 45 feet.

== Distribution ==
It is found throughout the Greater Antilles as well as the Lesser Antilles of the Caribbean.

== Habitat ==
Generally found in mountains of up to 1,300 feet (400 m) high. It grows in the forest of creeks in the mountains, and on the steep slopes of the highest peaks in Puerto Rico. It is also found in Toro Negro State Forest, in the Puerto Rico Cordillera Central. According to studies in the Luquillo Mountains, this palm also is associated with landslides.

== Uses ==
The fruit is the favorite food of the Puerto Rican parrot.

== Taxonomy ==
The plant was first described as Euterpe montana and was later transferred to the genus Prestoea.

Etymology

Prestoea: generic name in honor of Henry Prestoe (1842–1923), English botanist and traveler, who collected the plant in Trinidad.
montana: from the Latin, meaning "from the mountain".

== Gallery ==
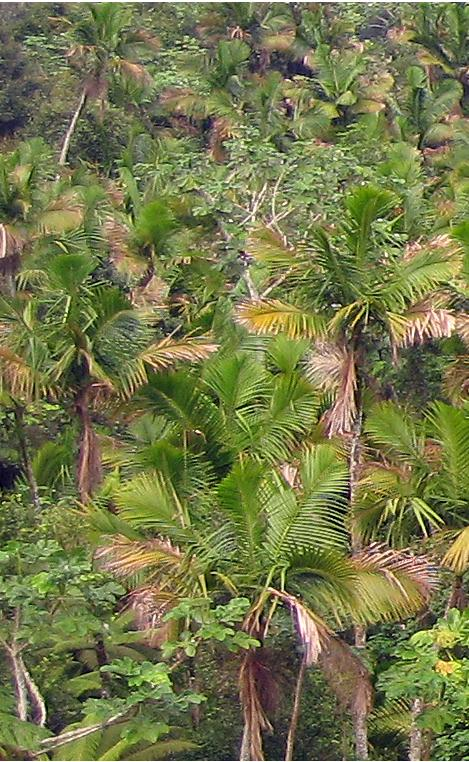
Prestoea acuminata var. montana forest in Toro Negro

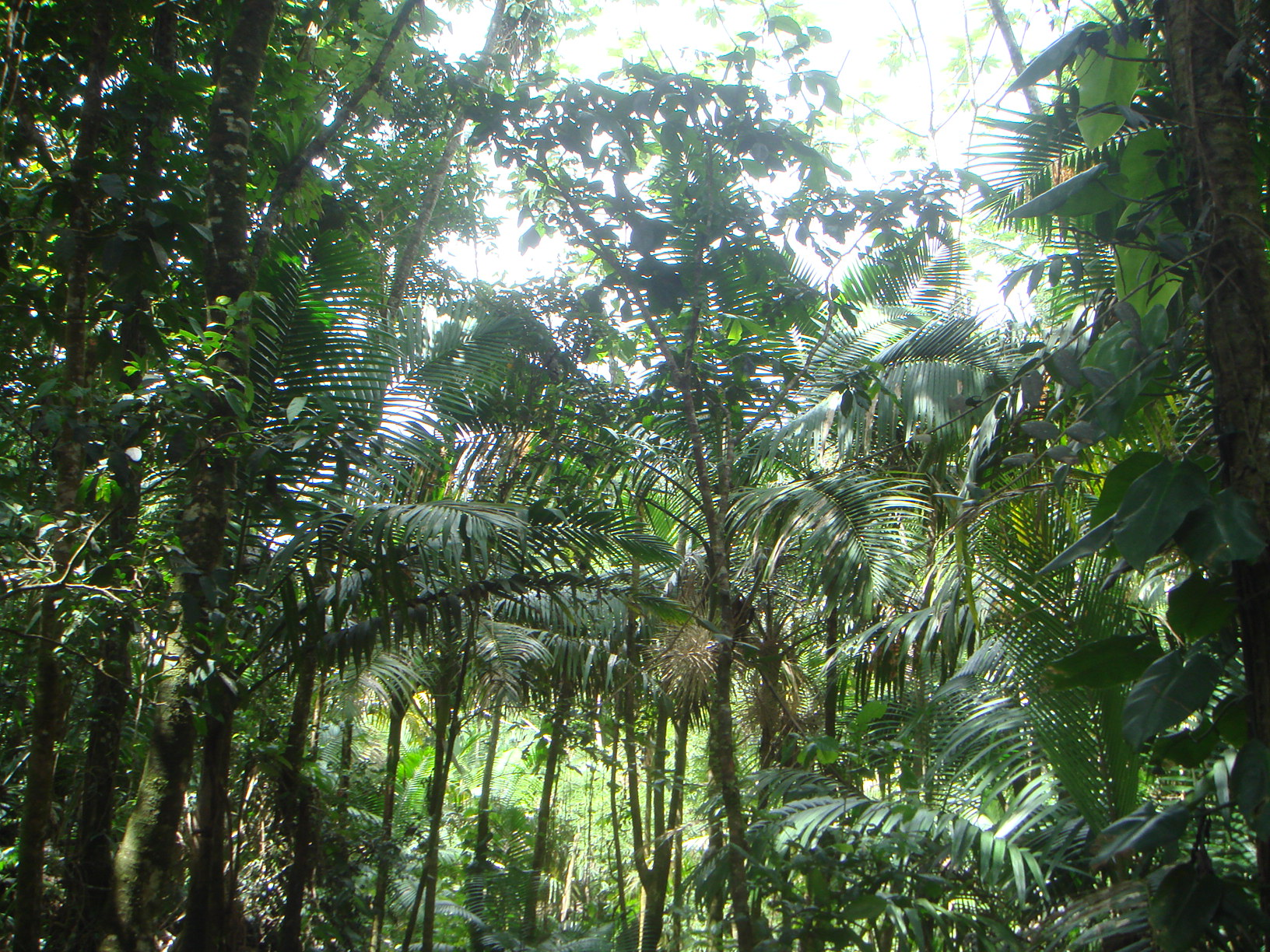
Prestoea acuminata var. montana among trees, El Yunque

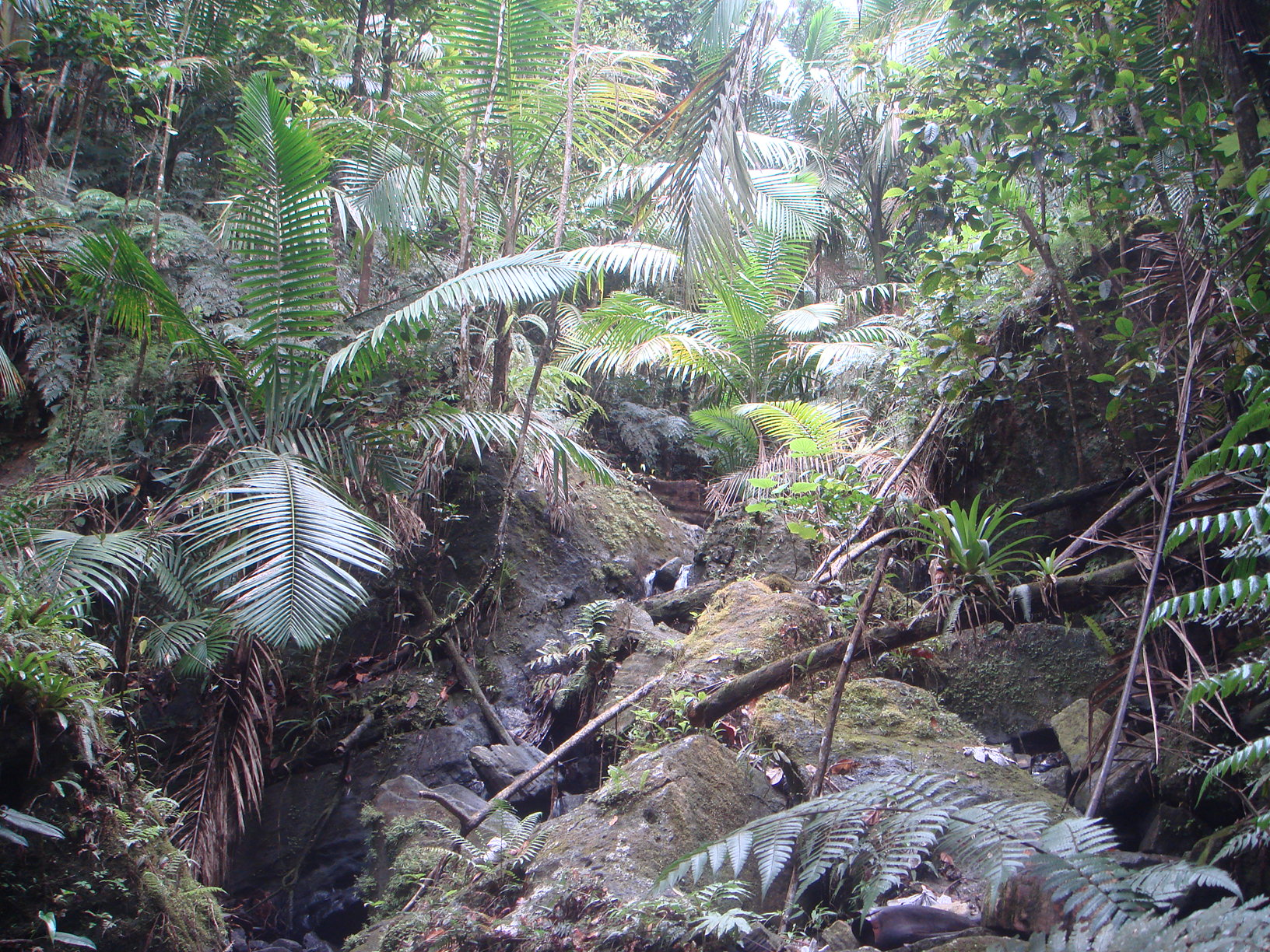
Prestoea acuminata var. montana on the banks of a creek, El Yunque

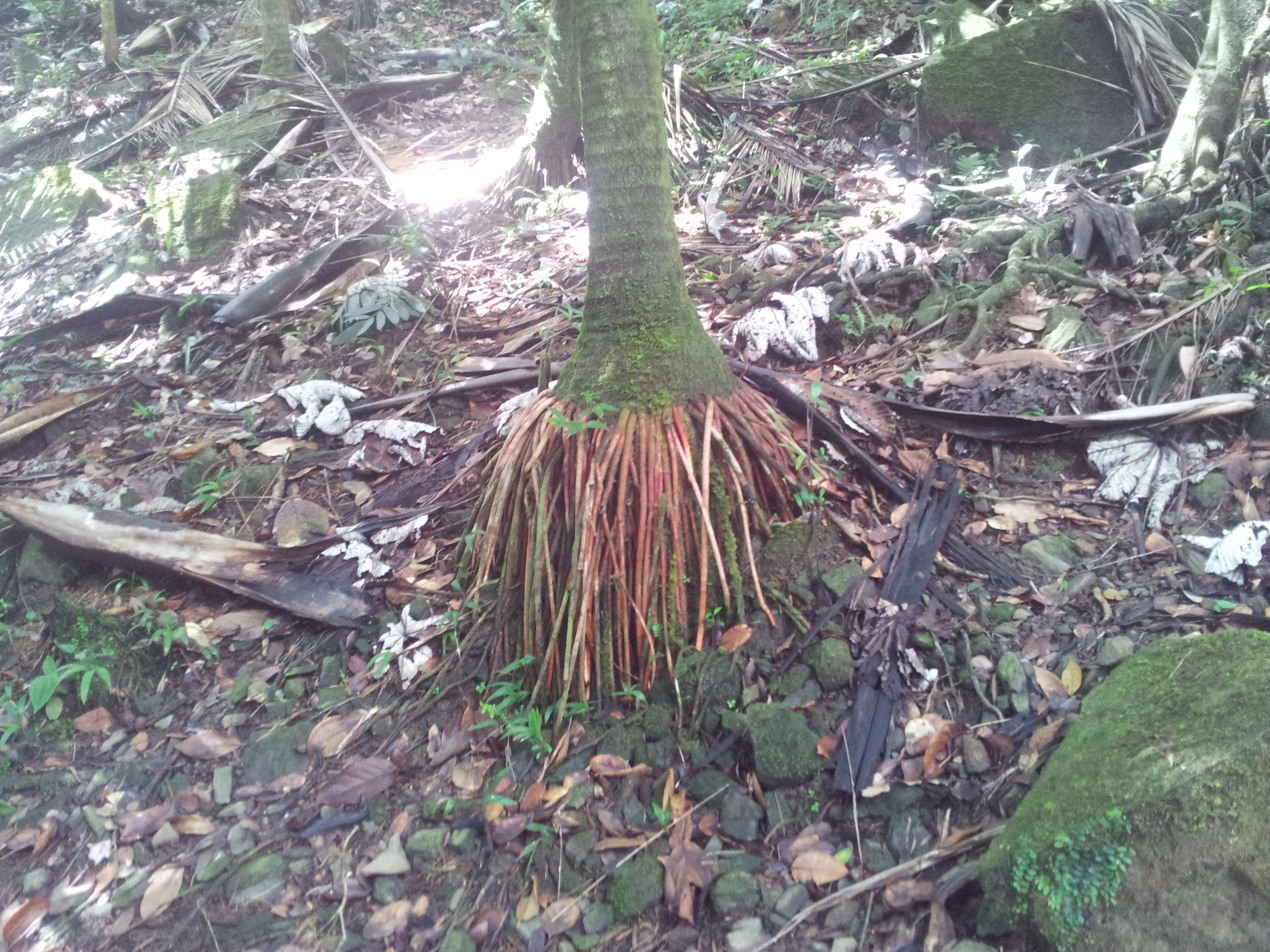
Roots of Prestoea acuminata var. montana in El Yunque

== Bibliography ==
1. Anonymous. 1986. List-Based Rec., Soil Conservation Service, U.S.D.A. Database of the U.S.D.A., Beltsville.
2. T. J. Killeen, E. García Estigarribia & S. G. Beck. (eds.) 1993. Guía Árb. Bolivia 1–958. Herbario Nacional de Bolivia & Missouri Botanical Garden. Editorial Quipus srl., La Paz, Bolivia. 1993.

== See also ==
Relationship with inhabiting frog Common coquí: Eleutherodactylus coqui
