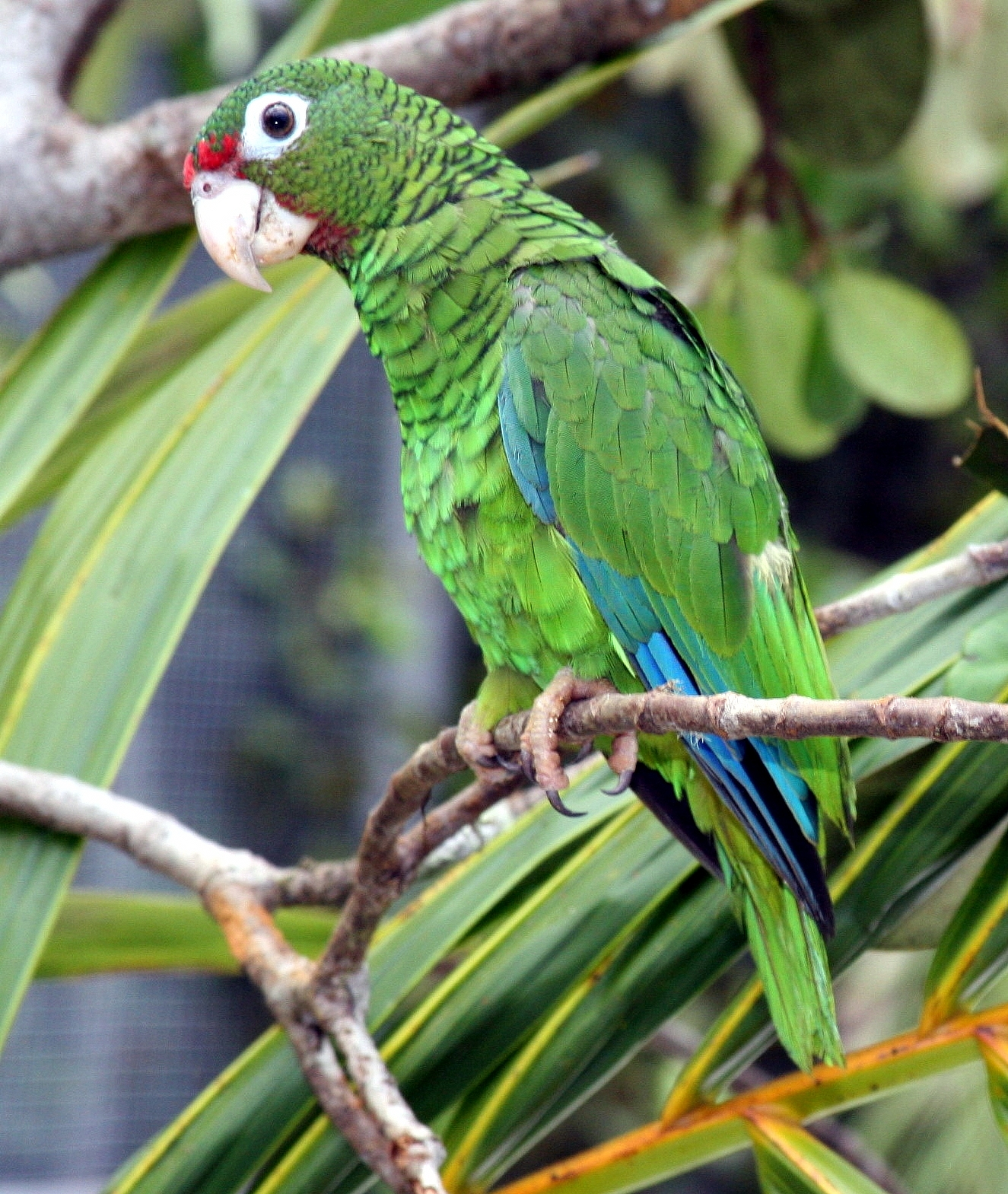
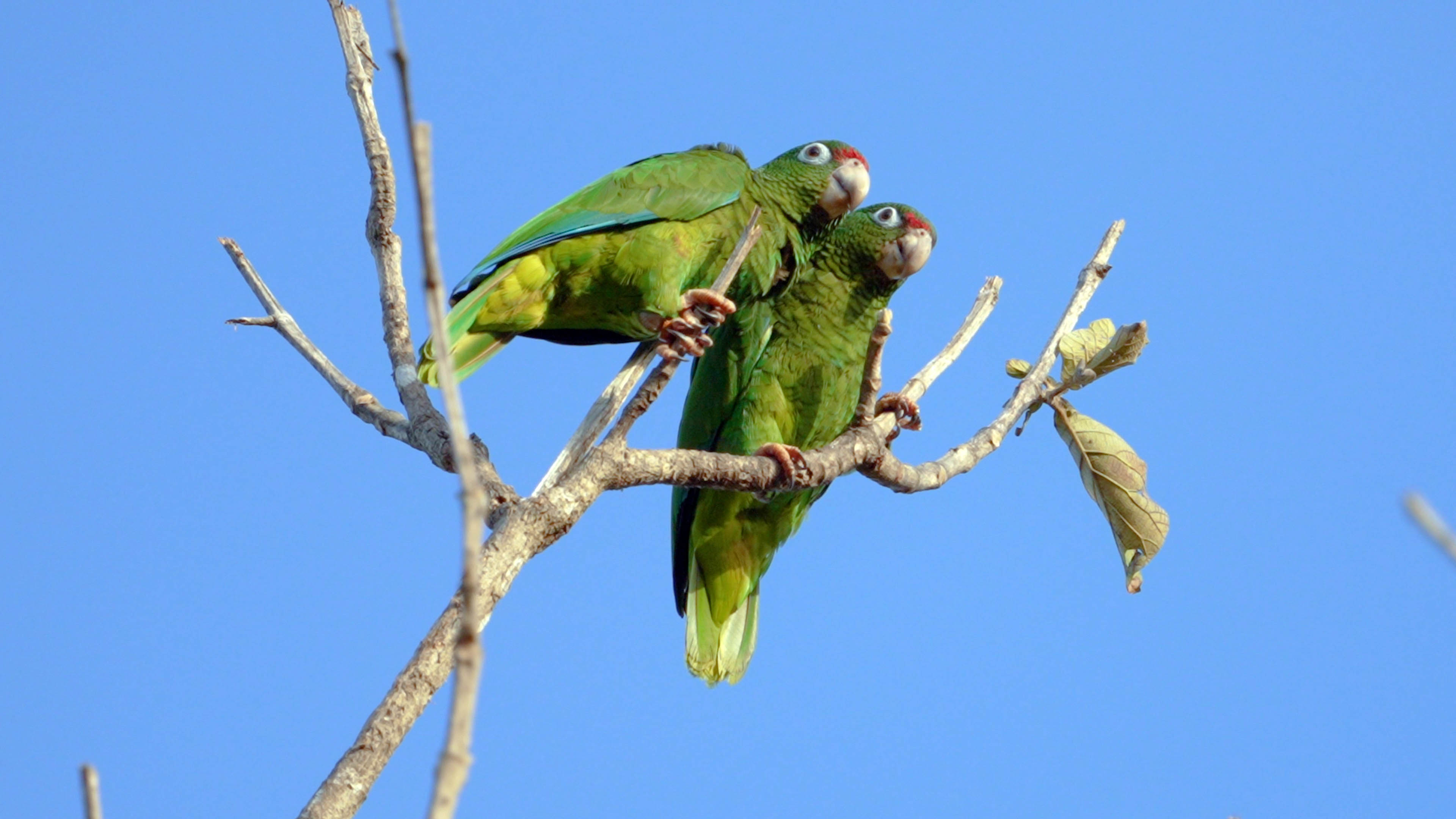
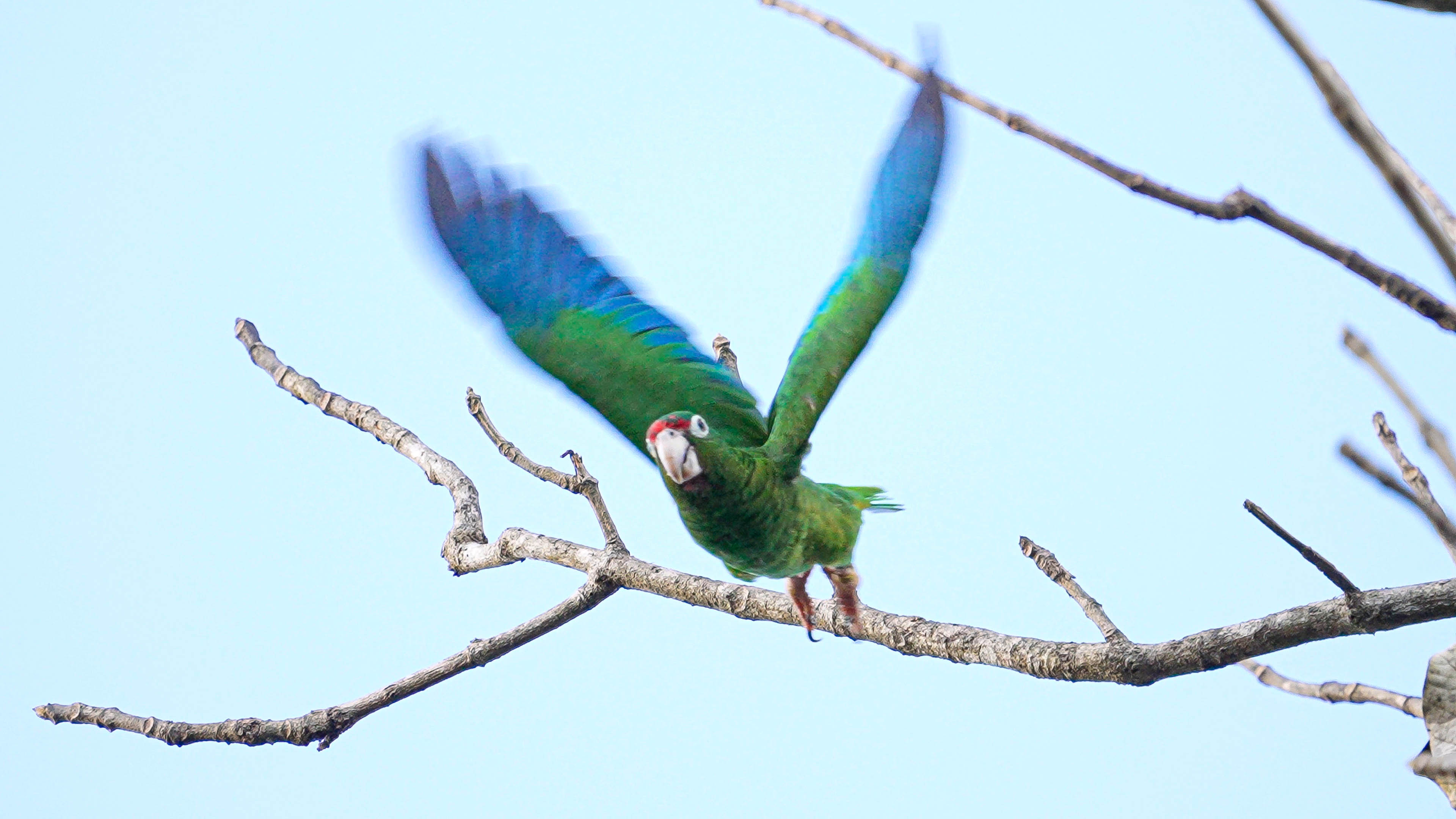

Conservation status
- Critically Endangered (IUCN 3.1)
- CITES Appendix I

Scientific classification
- Kingdom: Animalia
- Phylum: Chordata
- Class: Aves
- Order: Psittaciformes
- Family: Psittacidae
- Genus: Amazona
- Species: A. vittata

Binomial name
- Amazona vittata (Boddaert, 1783)

Subspecies
- A. v. vittata; A. v. gracilipes †

= Puerto Rican amazon =

Parrot endemic to the archipelago of Puerto Rico

The Puerto Rican amazon (Amazona vittata), also known as the Puerto Rican parrot (Spanish: cotorra puertorriqueña) or iguaca (Taíno), is the only extant parrot endemic to Puerto Rico. Measuring 28–30 cm (11.0–11.8 in), the bird is a predominantly green parrot with a red forehead and white rings around the eyes. Belonging to the Neotropical genus Amazona, its closest relatives are believed to be the Cuban amazon (Amazona leucocephala) and the Hispaniolan amazon (Amazona ventralis).

The Puerto Rican amazon reaches sexual maturity at between three and four years of age. It reproduces once a year and is a cavity nester. Once the female lays eggs she will remain in the nest and continuously incubate them until hatching. The chicks are fed by both parents and will fledge 60 to 65 days after hatching. This parrot's diet is varied and consists of flowers, fruits, leaves, bark and nectar obtained from the forest canopy.

The species is the only remaining native parrot to Puerto Rico and has been listed as critically endangered by the World Conservation Union since 1994. Once widespread and abundant, the population declined drastically in the 19th and early 20th centuries with the removal of most of its native habitat; the species has completely vanished from Vieques and Mona Island. Conservation efforts commenced in 1968 to save the bird from extinction.

== Taxonomy and evolution ==
The Puerto Rican amazon was described by the French polymath Georges-Louis Leclerc, Comte de Buffon in 1780 in his Histoire Naturelle des Oiseaux. The bird was also illustrated in a hand-coloured plate engraved by François-Nicolas Martinet in the Planches Enluminées D'Histoire Naturelle which was produced under the supervision of Edme-Louis Daubenton to accompany Buffon's text. Neither the plate caption nor Buffon's description included a scientific name but in 1783 the Dutch naturalist Pieter Boddaert coined the binomial name Psittacus vittatus in his catalogue of the Planches Enluminées. Buffon mistakenly believed that his specimen had been collected in the French colony of Saint-Domingue (modern Haiti), rather than in Puerto Rico. The Puerto Rican amazon is now placed in the large Neotropical genus Amazona that was introduced by the French naturalist René Lesson in 1830. The specific epithet vittatus is Latin for "banded".

Birds in the genus Amazona are commonly known as amazons. They have also been given the generic epithet of "parrot" by the American Ornithologists' Union, and hence "Puerto Rican parrot" is an alternative common name in North America. The indigenous Taíno people called it the iguaca, an onomatopoeic name that resembled the parrots' flight call.

There are two recognized subspecies:

- A. v. vittata is the nominate and only extant subspecies, inhabiting Puerto Rico and formerly nearby Vieques Island and Mona Island.
- A. v. gracilipes inhabited Culebra Island and is now extinct. It is unclear whether it was substantially different from the nominate subspecies.

=== Evolutionary history ===
- A. albifrons
- A. agilis
- - - A. collaria
    - - A. ventralis
      - - A. leucocephala
        - A. vittata

Phylogeny of the Greater Antillean Amazona after Russello and Amato, 2004

The various native parrot species in the West Indies are assumed to be descended from a singular group that immigrated to the Caribbean at some point. Some small species would have encountered problems traversing large bodies of water, but parrots have flight strength and various behavioral characteristics that would facilitate "over-water" dispersion. Most Caribbean bird species originate from Central, North and South America. The Amazona species found in the Caribbean are divided in two groups: five mid-sized species found in the Greater Antilles and seven large species in the Lesser Antilles. All the Greater Antillean amazons display characteristics leading to suppositions of relatedness, including predominantly green-toned color patterns and white rings around the eyes. Russello and Amato conclude that all Greater Antillean Amazona descend from Amazona albifrons with Amazona vittata, Amazona leucocephala, and Amazona ventralis constituting a complex, a cluster of species so closely related that they intergrade.

British ornithologist David Lack considered that the Puerto Rican amazon had evolved from the Hispaniolan amazon (A. ventralis) found in Hispaniola, but it has since been argued that he omitted some elements in his analysis, including the similarities found between the black-billed amazon (A. agilis) of Jamaica and the Puerto Rican amazon. Subsequent studies showed that size and color patterns were not sufficient to assess evolutionary relationships, and that patterns changed with relative ease even within members of the same species. The research concluded that the Puerto Rican amazon may share a common ancestor with the Jamaican A. agilis. However, recent phylogenetic studies show that the Puerto Rican amazon is more closely related to the Hispaniolan amazon and the Cuban amazon than to the black-billed amazon.

== Description ==
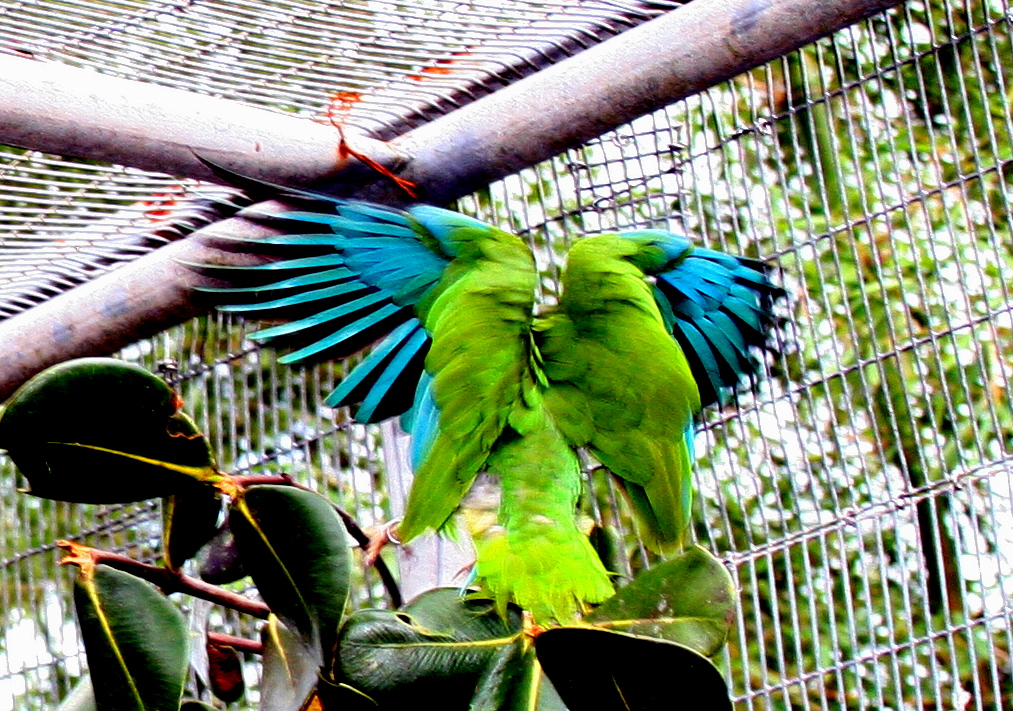
The Puerto Rican amazon in flight, showing distinctive blue feathers

The Puerto Rican amazon measures 28–30 cm (11.0–11.8 in) and weighs 250–300 g (8.8–10.6 oz), or 275 g (9.7 oz) on average. Although small compared to amazons in general, it is similar in size to other Greater Antilles Amazona species. Sexual dimorphism is not present. Both males and females have predominantly green plumage, though their feathers have blue edges. The primary flight feathers of the wings and the main covert feathers are dark blue. The color of the feathers on the underside varies depending on the body part: the feathers on the underside of the wings, which can be seen during flight, are bright blue; those in the tail have yellow-green tone. Their underparts are paler and yellow-tinged, their foreheads are red, and they have white ovals around the eyes. The iris is brown, the bill a horn color, and the legs yellow-tan. Aside from DNA tests, males and females can only be distinguished by behavioral differences during the breeding season. Immature birds have plumage similar to adults.

== Population and distribution ==
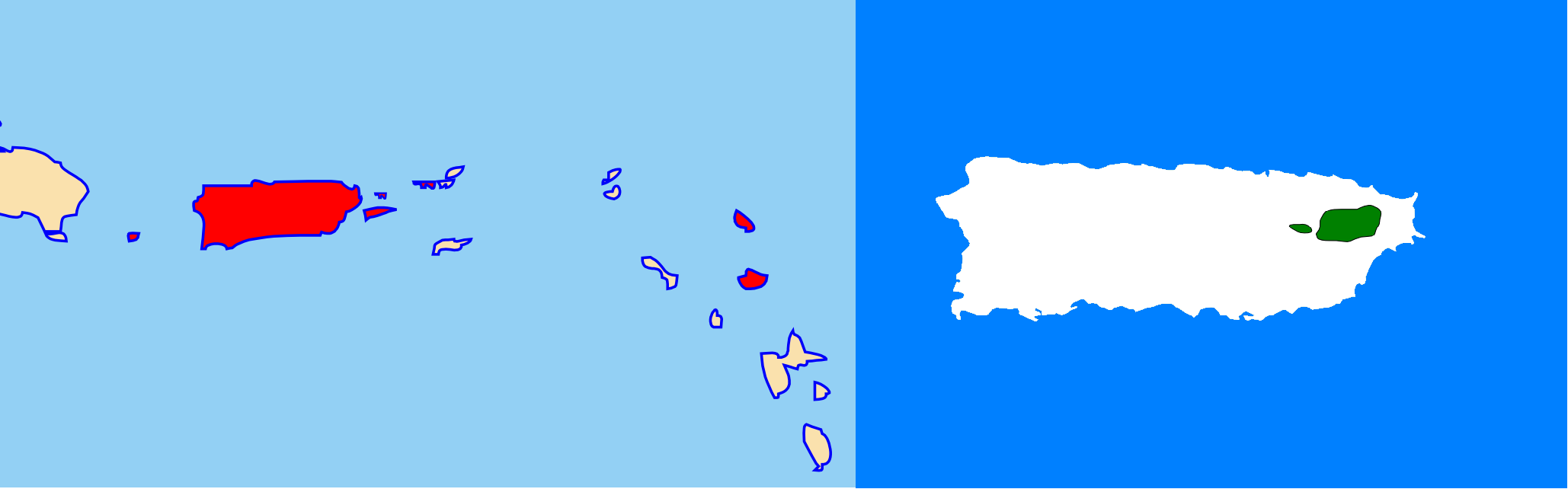
Puerto Rican amazon historical range at left (in red) and current range at right (in green)

The precise distribution of the Puerto Rican amazon before the arrival of Spanish colonialists is uncertain, because of a lack of contemporary records and then the extermination of the indigenous Taíno people, but the species was apparently widespread and abundant. There is also evidence the species may have inhabited other nearby islands, such as Antigua, Barbuda and the Virgin Islands. Estimates of the parrot's early numbers vary greatly. Some authorities claim that there were once more than a million individuals, while others suggest a more modest population of 100,000. During the first 150 years of Spanish rule the human population was small, and in 1650, when the population of the island was 880 people, the species was still abundant throughout the archipelago. After 1650, human habitation increased exponentially, and by the 18th century the Puerto Rican amazon population started to be affected. Heinrich Moritz Gaede, a German naturalist, declared that by 1836 the parrot population had noticeably declined. Even so, as late as 1864, British ornithologist Edward Cavendish Taylor noted that the parrots were still common near the island's capital, San Juan.

At first, human activity had not posed a significant threat to the Puerto Rican amazon. The Taíno hunted the parrot but without much effect on its population. In the past 200 years, however, many factors have led to a drastic decrease in the birds' numbers: agricultural development, the construction of roads, hydroelectric development, and the adoption of young chicks as pets. Especially during the latter half of the 19th century, most of Puerto Rico's virgin forests, a historical habitat of the species, were cleared for agricultural development, primarily for the production of sugar, cotton, corn and rice. The amazon quickly came to rely on these crops as its main food source and so became seen as a pest; local farmers repelled or hunted the bird if possible. As agriculture expanded, the amazon's habitat disappeared further and its population declined.

The species was historically found in mature or old-growth forests in Puerto Rico at all elevations, and in holes, cliffs, and other diverse habitats at lower elevations. The species could be found at medium elevations in the Guajataca State Forest (until 1910) and the Rio Abajo State Forest (until the 1920s), and at high elevations in the Carite State Forest (until the 1930s). Accounts from the early 1900s describe the parrots traveling away from the Luquillo forest and the Sierra de Cayey towards the main island's coast to find food. The species was extirpated from Culebra by the early 20th century. The karst region in the northwestern part of Puerto Rico was identified as a haven for the species. In particular, a region named Valle de las Cotorras (Valley of the Parrots), located in the region between San Sebastián and Morovis, was home to a sizable population. Eventually their natural habitat was reduced to the Cordillera Central. By 1960 they were only to be found in primary forest at the Luquillo Mountains in El Yunque National Forest. The species is currently found at elevations between 396 and 823 m (1,299 and 2,700 ft). Since the species requires mature forests with open-cavity trees for reproduction, it does not occur in dwarf and secondary forests.

By the 1950s, there were only 200 parrots in the wild, and in 1975 the population reached an absolute low of 13 individuals. Numbers then recovered, and in August 1989 there were an estimated minimum of 47 individuals. But on September 18, 1989, Hurricane Hugo struck the northeast coast of Puerto Rico inflicting heavy casualties on the remaining birds. In the aftermath of the hurricane the population was estimated at 23 individuals. In 2004, the wild population was 30–35 individuals, and the long-term trend appears to be stable albeit with some fluctuations. The current range of the species is 16 km^{2} (6.2 sq mi), 0.2% of what it once was. In the aftermath of Hurricane María it was estimated only 3 of the 50 parrots survived in the wild, representing a loss of 90%. Recovery programs continue and as of 2021 the total population is around 500 including those in captivity and in the wild.

== Behavior ==
External audio
- You may see a listing of the Puerto Rican amazon vocal repertoire here

The Puerto Rican amazon is diurnal, typically beginning its day half an hour after sunrise. It is generally secretive when inside its nest, using its green plumage as camouflage. In contrast, it may be vocal and noisy when outside the nest. Upon taking flight, its color pattern provides some contrast to the forest. The flight mechanism of this species is similar to the one found in other amazons, and involves strokes below the body axis, unlike most birds whose wings flow above their bodies in flight. Amazons can fly moderately fast, reaching a top speed of approximately 30 km/h (19 mph), and are fairly agile when evading predators in mid-air. When in search of food, the parrots group in pairs. Couples and their fledged young display a tendency to stay together. The amazon makes two flight calls, a take-off squawk which consist of a pattern of long squawks, and a loud "bugle", commonly used in flight and which may have several meanings depending on the circumstances when it is used.

=== Diet ===
Like almost all amazons, the Puerto Rican amazon is a herbivore. Its diet consists of flowers, fruits, leaves, bark and nectar obtained from the forest's canopy. The species has been recorded to consume more than 60 different materials, although its diet was historically more varied due to its larger range. Among the items it consumes are the pericarp of the seeds of sierran palm (Prestoea montana), tabonuco (Dacryodes excelsa), and negra lora (Matayba domingensis); the fruits of bejuco de rana (Marcgravia sintenisii), camasey (Miconia sintenisii), cupey de altura (Clusia gundlachii), and palo de cruz (Rheedia portoricensis); the flowers of bejuco de rana, achiotillo (Alchornea latifolia), and Piptocarpha tetrantha; the leaves and twigs of cupeillo (Clusia grisebachiana), laurel magnolia (Magnolia splendens), caimitillo verde (Micropholis garciniaefolia), and Piptocarpha tetrantha; the bark of bejuco de rana, cupeillo, and common cachimbo (Psychotria berteriana); and the buds of cuaba (Inga vera). It normally selects the fruits positioned directly in front of its eyes, picking them one at a time with some rare exceptions. When feeding, it uses a foot to pick up the food. The amazon feeds in a slow, paused manner taking 8–60 seconds to consume separate items.

=== Breeding ===
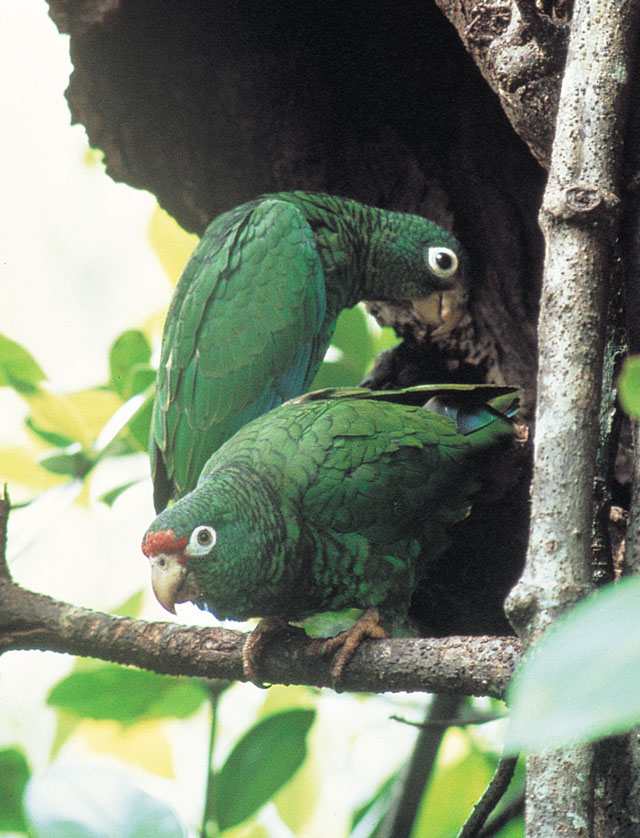
A pair of Puerto Rican amazons, which usually mate for life

The Puerto Rican amazon usually mates for life, with pairs only changing mates if one bird perishes or abandons the nest. A male may abandon the female if the latter is injured, re-mating with a more "physically perfect" subject. The pairing process is unknown; however, new pairs tend to participate in mutual mating dances characterized by coordinated bows, partial extension of the wings and full tail expansion.

The Puerto Rican amazon is a secondary cavity nester, nesting in tree trunk cavities, both naturally occurring and excavated by other species. It prefers to nest in Palo colorado trees (Cyrilla racemiflora), but uses other trees, including the laurel sabino (Magnolia splendens) and tabonuco (Dacryodes excelsa), to a lesser extent. These trees are mature cavity-forming trees which provide protection against predators and the entry of water. Recently, the species has also nested in artificial wooden boxes designed as part of the recovery plan for the species. Nest height varies from 7–15 m (23–49 ft) above ground. The male usually leads the search for nest sites, although the final decision seems to be taken by the female. Once a site is selected, the pair will spend some time inspecting and cleaning it. No lining material is added to the nest.

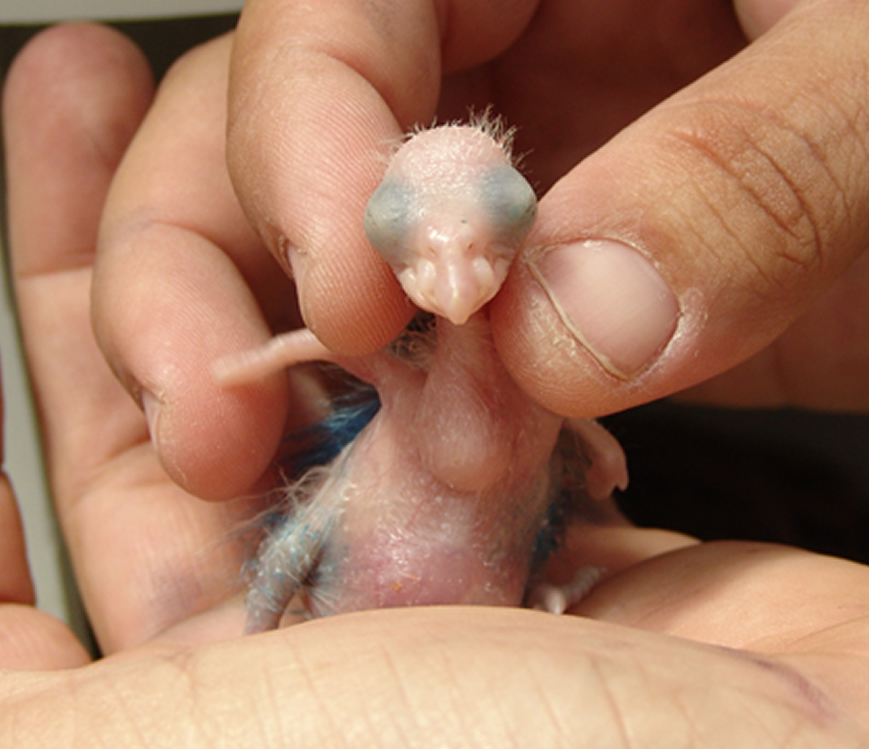
Newly hatched chick

The Puerto Rican amazon reaches sexual maturity at 4 years of age in the wild and at 3 years in captivity. The species usually reproduces once a year between the months of January and July (the dry season). Copulation between pairs seems to be closely related to food transfers, with this possibly serving as a trigger for intercourse. Amazons have a copulation pattern similar to that found in other parrots throughout the Americas, with the male gripping a perch with one leg while passively placing the other in the female's back. As the time for egg-laying approaches the pair spends more time in the nest, with the male providing food to the female via regurgitation. The female lays 2–4 eggs that she exclusively incubates for a period of 24 to 28 days, while the male will be present in the vicinity of the nest when providing food. Females only leave the nest on rare occasions involving repelling predators or if the male has not brought food in an extended time frame. The chicks are fed by both parents until they leave the nest, usually 60 to 65 days after they hatch. Nonetheless, they remain dependent on their parents and travel with them until the next breeding season.

Like other amazons, the Puerto Rican amazon is gregarious while performing daily activities, but territorial around its nest. The size of the territory around the nest is usually around 50 meters (164 feet). Pairs are extremely cautious near their nest, usually moving in a slow manner when leaving the nest to avoid the attention of predators. Although territorial defense is mostly composed of loud vocalizations there are instances of actual physical combat. Pairs will defend their nest sites against invading couples, sometimes focusing on the location's defense instead of egg-laying. Pairs nesting in areas uninhabited by other parrots will remain mostly silent unless other parrots enter the zone. Some pairs may display moderate territoriality even when not apparently intending to nest, with these tendencies beginning in the latter half of the breeding season. One hypothesis is that this would occur in young pairs that had still not reached full maturity, serving as "practice territoriality".

== Threats and conservation ==
On March 11, 1967, the Puerto Rican amazon entered the United States Fish and Wildlife Service list of endangered species. At the time of inclusion the population was estimated at 70 individuals. In 1968, recovery efforts began to increase the population in the wild. In 1972, when the estimated population was 16 individuals, the United States Fish and Wildlife Service (USFWS) at the Luquillo Aviary began efforts to breed parrots in captivity and yielded good results. In June 2006, it was reported by the USFWS that its birds in captivity had successfully hatched 39 chicks (the yearly average is around 16). In 2006, 22 birds were released in the Rio Abajo State Forest to initiate a second wild population, and a further 19 were released at the same site on December 27, 2008. In 2012, the total estimated population was 58–80 individuals in the wild and over 300 individuals in captivity.

The World Conservation Union (IUCN) lists the Puerto Rican amazon as a critically endangered species since 1994. The species is regulated under Appendix I of the Convention on International Trade in Endangered Species of Wild Fauna and Flora (CITES), which prohibits commercial international trade in the species or its parts/derivatives.

=== Threats ===
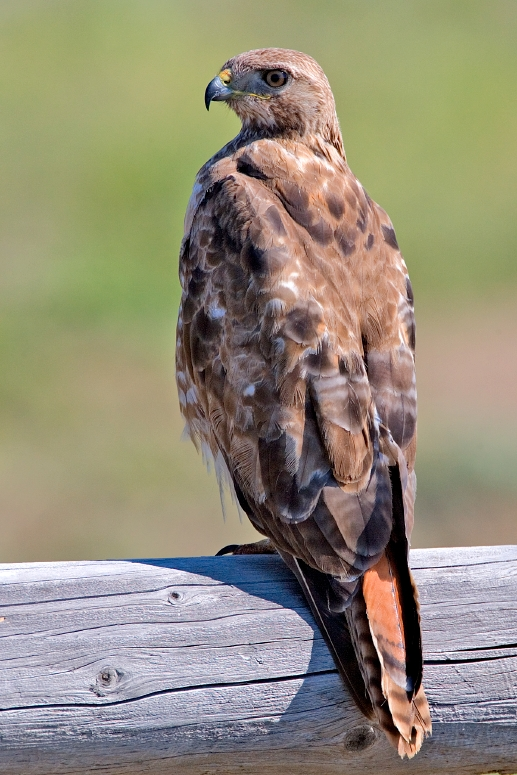
The red-tailed hawk (B. j. jamaicensis), known as Guaraguao in Puerto Rico, is a natural predator of the Puerto Rican amazon.

Human activity is arguably the main reason for the population decline of the Puerto Rican amazon. Early settlers of Puerto Rico, such as the Taíno, hunted it for food consumption but managed to maintain a healthy ecological balance. Later, habitat destruction, capture of immature individuals for the pet industry, hunting and predation contributed to the sharp population decline. The clearing of mature forests for agricultural development is the main reason for the decline of population.

Natural predators of the Puerto Rican amazon include the red-tailed hawk (Buteo jamaicensis), the broad-winged hawk (Buteo platypterus), the peregrine falcon (Falco peregrinus) and the pearly-eyed thrasher (Margarops fuscatus). The thrasher was first recorded in Puerto Rico in the mid-20th century and has been a problem for the parrot population since 1973; to combat this, specially designed deep nests were prepared for the parrots in subsequent years to prevent competition from the invaders. Introduced species are a threat: honeybees (Apis mellifera) and related Hispaniolan amazons may compete for nesting cavities, and black rats (Rattus rattus) and small Indian mongooses (Urva auropunctata) may eat eggs and chicks.

Natural disasters, such as hurricanes, were not a threat to the Puerto Rican parrot population when it was more readily self-maintaining, but as a result of the fragmentation and reduction of the population these disasters are now a threat as well. Hurricane Hugo passed through the species' range in September 1989, and reduced the population from 47 to 23 individuals.

=== Recovery plan ===
In response to the Puerto Rican amazon's low population and endangered status, a recovery plan was drafted and implemented in 1968. Its main objective was to downlist the species to threatened status by the year 2020. Other objectives included establishing two separate viable wild populations (each of which would consist of 500 or more individuals for a period of at least five years), protecting habitat for those populations, and controlling predators, parasites and competitors. A third site was planned in 2011 by the Caribbean Islands National Wildlife Refuge Complex. As part of the conservation efforts, a captive population was established in the Luquillo Aviary in 1973. Another was established in 1993 when some individuals were transferred from the Luquillo Aviary to the Rio Abajo State Forest under the administration of the Puerto Rican Department of Natural Resources (Departamento de Recursos Naturales y Ambientales). In 2007, expanded facilities at the Iguaca Aviary at the El Yunque National Forest were inaugurated and dedicated to the late Priscilla Stubbe, who was a major fundraiser for the new facility.

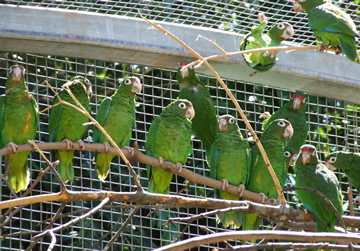
Captive specimens at the Iguaca Aviary of El Yunque National Forest (2011). Located in the vicinity of Luquillo, Puerto Rico, this was the first facility of the reproduction program and currently serves as one of three specialized reserves.

Human activity once again threatened the amazon during the following years. In 2012, it was reported that the unsanctioned flight of light aircraft from adjacent islands was disrupting the reproductive and social behaviors of the species. Via Verde, a gas pipeline grid proposed by the Luis Fortuño administration, raised concerns among conservationists due to further deforestation of the regions where the birds feed. New conservation efforts have also begun during this timeframe. In 2011, a research team of the University of Puerto Rico at Mayagüez sequenced the amazon's genome. On August 15, 2013, the discovery of non-assisted nests in the Río Abajo State Forest was announced. Experts considered this a sign of expansion, implying that the reintroduced amazon population was fully adapting to wild life and was dispersing throughout the region. This was noted as a significant advance, since El Yunque is not an ideal habitat for the bird due to its humidity, which precipitates sickness in some of the individuals. This was accompanied by a second announcement, which noted that added to the known number of amazons in the wild (fluctuating between 64 and 112 specimens) there is an unmonitored population of approximately 50 birds dispersed throughout Puerto Rico.

The creation of another aviary and captive reproduction center was considered throughout 2013, with the municipalities of Maricao and Isabela being analyzed. In November 2013, plans for the establishment of a third population in the Maricao State Forest were formally announced. The following month, ten amazons were released at Río Abajo. 2013 set a new record for the reproduction program, which produced 51 fledglings and shattered the previous record of 34 that was established in 2011. The wild population grew by 15 chicks, an improvement from the 12 born during the previous year. During this time frame, the known number of amazon specimens rounded 500 individuals. A severe drought caused by the emergence of El Niño began during the spring of 2015 and extended throughout the summer, benefitting the breeding of the amazons in El Yunque by extending their reproductive season. However, this weather pattern also increased the number of mongooses present in the forest, representing a risk for the population. On August 13, 2015, a group of 25 amazons was moved from the other aviaries to a repurposed installation in Maricao. Each member was brought individually in order to ensure their safety while being transported and later placed in an acclimation program that is expected to last a year, before they are released to create a new population in the region.

To assist in improving the understanding of the overall population health of this species and aid in captive breeding programs the genome was sequenced by researchers at University of Puerto Rico at Mayagüez. As an emblematic species of Puerto Rico, this was carried out as a uniquely community-funded project. The research budget raised by student-organized art and fashion shows dedicated to the effort plus small personal donations from Puerto Rican citizens who wanted to support the work. The data were used to produce microsatellite marker sets to aid captive breeding efforts and population monitoring studies by providing unique identifiers for individual birds. In early 2020, 30 parrots were released into the El Yunque rainforest.

== See also ==
- Fauna of Puerto Rico
- El Toro Wilderness
- List of birds of Puerto Rico
- List of endemic fauna of Puerto Rico
- List of Puerto Rican birds
- List of Vieques birds
- The Great Silence (short story), a science fiction short story by Ted Chiang featuring a Puerto Rican amazon as the narrator and primary character.

== General and cited references ==
- Forshaw, Joseph M. & William T. Cooper (1978). Parrots of the World (2nd ed.). Melbourne: Landsdowne. ISBN 0-7018-0690-7.
- Russello, Michael A. & George Amato (2004). "A molecular phylogeny of Amazona: implications for Neotropical parrot biogeography, taxonomy, and conservation". Molecular Phylogenetics and Evolution. 30 (2): 421–437. Bibcode:2004MolPE..30..421R. doi:10.1016/S1055-7903(03)00192-1. PMID 14715233.
- Snyder, Noel F. R.; James W. Wiley & Cameron B. Kepler (1987). The Parrots of Luquillo: Natural History and Conservation of the Puerto Rican Parrot. Los Angeles: Western Foundation of Vertebrate Zoology. ISBN 0-935868-27-5.
