= Oenocarpus makeru =

Conservation status
- Least Concern (IUCN 3.1)

Scientific classification
- Kingdom: Plantae
- Clade: Tracheophytes
- Clade: Angiosperms
- Clade: Monocots
- Clade: Commelinids
- Order: Arecales
- Family: Arecaceae
- Genus: Oenocarpus
- Species: O. makeru

Binomial name
- Oenocarpus makeru Bernal, Galeano, & Henderson

Species of palm

Oenocarpus makeru is a species of flowering plant in the family Arecaceae. It is found only in Colombia.
