= Allora & Calzadilla =

Collaborative duo of visual artists

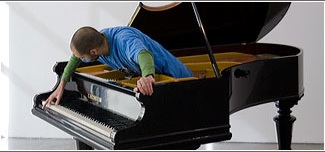
- Allora & Calzadilla, "Stop Repair, Prepare", 2008
- Born: Jennifer Allora March 20, 1974 (age 52) Philadelphia, Pennsylvania; Guillermo Calzadilla January 10, 1971 (age 55) Havana, Cuba
- Education: Jennifer Allora: University of Richmond, Virginia, Massachusetts Institute of Technology and Guillermo Calzadilla: Escuela de Artes Plasticas, San Juan and Bard College
- Known for: performance, sculpture, video art, and sound art

Jennifer Allora (born 20 March 1974) and Guillermo Calzadilla (born 10 January 1971) are a collaborative duo of visual artists who live and work in San Juan, Puerto Rico. They were the United States Representatives for the 2011 Venice Biennale, the 54th International Art Exhibition, in 2011.

== Early life and education ==
Jennifer Allora was born in 1974 in Philadelphia, Pennsylvania. She completed a BA the University of Richmond in Virginia (1996). She was a fellow at the Whitney Museum of American Art Independent Study Program (1998-1999). In 2003 she attained a Master of Science from the Massachusetts Institute of Technology.

Guillermo Calzadilla was born in 1971 in Havana, Cuba. He completed a BFA from Escuela de Artes Plásticas y Diseño de Puerto Rico in San Juan, Puerto Rico (1996). studied at the Skowhegan School of Painting and Sculpture (1998) and completed an MFA at Bard College (2001).

They would collaborate after meeting in 1995 while studying in Florence, Italy.

== Work and themes ==
Since the beginning of their collaborative career, Allora & Calzadilla have worked in media that produced a body of work in sculpture, photography, performance art, sound and video.

Starting in 1999, Land Mark has been a series of projects that encompasses film, video, photography and performance pieces related to the Puerto Rican island of Vieques, used for 60 years by the United States for military operations, leading to a civil disobedience campaign waged by local residents. The works include Land Mark (1999/2003/2006), Land Mark (Footprints) (2001–02), Returning a Sound (2004), Under Discussion (2005) and Half Mast\Full Mast (2010). Allora & Calzadilla interrogate the economic, cultural, and political markers that distinguishes one area of land from another, and the processes of colonization and gentrification that come to define its changing status. As a whole, these works connected performances typical of political activism to artistic traditions like engraving. Land Mark is explained semantically as an instrument for reading marks left on the territory (landmarks) instead of as a simple point of spatial orientation (landmark). The spatial investigations in Allora & Calzadilla's work are made in terms of what the artists call “the trace.” At once a poetic trope and a set of material operations, the trace links presence and absence, inscription and erasure, preservation and destruction, and appearance and disappearance.

Allora & Calzadilla's body of work has long explored the dynamic between music and power. Some of the pieces that trace this "age-old sonic militarism against the contours of its relationship to contemporary culture and political ideology" are Clamor (2006), Sediments, Sentiments (Figures of Speech) (2007), Wake Up (2007) and Stop, Repair, Prepare: Variations on Ode to Joy for a Prepared Piano (2008). The first three feature "massive sculptural installation, live performance, collaboration, and, of course, extensive sound tracks." Stop, Repair, Prepare is a hybrid of sculpture, performance and experimental musical practice. It consists of an early 20th century Bechstein piano that has been put up on wheels and ‘prepared’ by cutting a round hole in the center of the body and reversing the pedals, which allows a series of performers to play variations on the Ode to Joy (as transcribed for piano by Franz Liszt) from inside of the instrument. During the performance, the pianist, girdled by the absurd skirt of the instrument, periodically trudges with it through the performance space, dragging its weight as he or she plays.

Since their participation in dOCUMENTA (13) with the video Raptor's Rapture, Allora & Calzadilla, have created works that move beyond the purely human. According to critic Emily Eliza Scott, their work is "focused to engage what we might call the worldly. These artworks illuminate entanglements between the human and the nonhuman as they unfold in time, signaling a dual (re-) thinking of humans as natural---one among other species and surroundings---and nature as historical." Following the same thematic interest in cultural artifacts and deep time, the artists presented the two part exhibition "Intervals" at the Philadelphia Museum of Art and The Fabric Workshop and Museum. There, they employed objects, films, live performances, and sound to invoke the span of geologic time and our own place within it. The artists presented a trilogy of video works that present modern musicians and vocalists engaging with ancient artifacts through sound. Apotome (2013) stars singer Tim Storms, who holds the world record for producing the lowest note every recorded—only audible to the human ear with amplification. As he wanders among taxidermied animals in subterranean storerooms of Paris's National History Museum he produces, according to critic Emily Nathan, "a deep, satanic rumble" which "seems to usher from his very core." These sounds are a subsonic version of a musical score played in 1798 for two elephants brought to Paris as spoils from the Napoleonic Wars, in the first recorded instance of attempted inter-species communication through music. In 2014 they produced the film The Great Silence in collaboration with writer Ted Chiang about the Arecibo Telescope, the Fermi paradox, and the problems of SETI (search for extraterrestrial intelligence) programs.

For the 56th Biennale di Venezia, Allora & Calzadilla presented In the Midst of Things, a choral work with music by composer Gene Coleman based on Haydn’s oratorio The Creation (1796–98), whose original libretto drew on descriptions of the origins of the world and humankind from the Book of Psalms, the Book of Genesis and Milton's Paradise Lost (1667). Allora & Calzadilla follow Milton's in medias res tradition for a series of interruptions on Haydn's score. In taking liberties, Allora & Calzadilla are also playing on the translation history of the libretto: originally written in rather awkward English, it's said to have been improved by the subsequent German translation. According to Dorothy Feaver, "the Voxnova Italia choir's physical movement through the Arsenale mimics their voices: they shift positions, facing each other, turning away, roaming through the space in low-key cotton clothes, epic but casual." In the piece, cacophony and melody confront one another — just as the group of choral interpreters move back and forth in the space. Referring this work, Laura C. Rogers has said the artists "challenge viewers to build meaning by reading a work as literal, metaphorical, evidential, and political, but also to take part in the work as an experiential event that heightens one's aesthetic sensibility."

== Exhibitions ==
Allora & Calzadilla's work has been featured in solo and group exhibitions internationally. Notable exhibitions include All the World's Futures, curated by Okwui Enwezor, at the Venice Biennale (2015), Intervals, curated by Carlos Basualdo and Erica F. Battle, at the Philadelphia Museum of Art and the Fabric Workshop and Museum (2014), the group show Costume Bureau (2014) at Framer Framed in Amsterdam, dOCUMENTA (13) (2012), curated by Carolyn Christov-Bakargiev. Their work has been exhibited in solo and group exhibitions in venues such as the Museum of Modern Art (2009), National Museum of Art, Oslo (2009) Haus der Kunst, Munich (2008), Serpentine Gallery and Whitechapel Art Gallery, London (2007), Les Rencontres d'Arles festival, France (2008), Stedelijk Museum in Amsterdam (2008), Kunsthalle Zurich (2007), and the Renaissance Society, Chicago (2007). Allora & Calzadilla also participated in the 5th and 7th Gwangju Biennale (2004 and 2008).

=== 2011 Venice Biennale ===
On September 8, 2010, the United States Bureau of Educational and Cultural Affairs (ECA) announced the selection of Allora & Calzadilla as the American representative at the 2011 Venice Biennale, a first for artists living in Puerto Rico. The proposal for the exhibition was developed between the artists and curator Lisa D. Freiman (chair, Department of Contemporary Art, Indianapolis Museum of Art, and Director, 100 Acres: The Virginia B. Fairbanks Art & Nature Park), during the fall and winter of 2009. The exhibition consisted of six new commissions including: Armed Freedom Lying on a Sunbed (2011), Track and Field (2011), Body in Flight (Delta) (2011), Body in Flight (American) (2011), choreographed by Rebecca Davis, Algorithm (2011) and Half Mast\Full Mast (2010). In most of the pieces, the artists did away with subtlety in favor of a direct invocation of the imposing specter of American militarism, treating nationalism first and foremost as an aesthetic language that expresses itself through the military machine, ritualized bodies, and official architecture. The installations and performances inside the pavilion further the artists’ investigations of “bio-power” and technology, deforming and repurposing bodies and materials in conjunctions that are at once ominous and comical.

== Public collections ==
Their works are held in a number of public institutions, including the Pérez Art Museum Miami, Solomon R. Guggenheim Museum, New York, the Museum of Modern Art, New York, Centre Pompidou, Paris, the Dallas Museum of Art, Dallas, TX, the Museum of Contemporary Art, Chicago, the Walker Art Center, the Tate Modern, London, the Princeton University Art Museum, New Jersey, the Museum Het Domein, the Museo de Arte de Puerto Rico, San Juan, the MUSEION – Museum of Modern and Contemporary Art, Bolzano, the Musée d'Art Moderne de la Ville de Paris, the Kunstmuseen Krefeld, The Israël Museum, Jerusalem, the Fonds Régional d’Art Contemporain (FRAC), Aquitaine, the Castello de Rivoli Museo d’Arte Contemporanea, Rivoli, the Baltimore Museum of Art, Baltimore, Artium. Centro Museo Vasco de Arte Contemporáneo, Basque Country and the Ellipse Foundation in Alcoitão, Portugal.

== Recognition ==
In 2008 Allora & Calzadilla were featured in the PBS series Art:21. In 2011 the artists were shortlisted for London's Fourth Plinth commission. They represented the US in the 2011 Venice Biennale.

=== Awards & Grants ===
- 2007 Rencontres d'Arles Discovery Award laureate, France
- 2006 Hugo Boss Prize Finalist
- 2006 Nam June Paik Award Finalist
- 2004 Gwangju Biennial Prize
- 2003 Penny McCall Foundation Grant
- 2002 Joan Mitchell Foundation Grant
- 2000-2001 Cintas Fellowship (Guillermo Calzadilla)

== Bibliography ==
=== Solo Exhibition Catalogues and Publications ===
- Freiman, Lisa D, ed. Gloria: Allora & Calzadilla. New York: DelMonico Books and Prestel, 2011.
- McKee, Yates. Allora & Calzadilla: Vieques Videos 2003-2010. London: Lisson Gallery, 2011.
- Stange, Raimar. Allora & Calzadilla. Nurnberg: Verlag fur moderne Kunst Nurnberg, 2010.
- Ruf, Beatrix, ed. Allora & Calzadilla. Zurich: JRP/Ringier, 2009.
- Allora, Jennifer and Guillermo Calzadilla. Guantanamo Bay Song Book. Japan: CCA Kitakyushu, 2009.
- Klerck Gange, Eva and Hou Hanru. Allora & Calzadilla. Oslo: Nasjonalmuseet for kunst, arkiyektur og design, 2009
- Rosenberg, Angela (ed.), Allora & Calzadilla Compass, Verlag der Buchhandlung Walther König, Cologne, 2009.
- Martin, Sylvia. Allora & Calzadilla – A Man Screaming is Not a Dancing Bear. How To Appear Invisible. Krefeld: Kunstmuseen Krefeld/Museum Haus Esters, 2009.
- Jennifer Allora and Guillermo Calzadilla, Allora & Calzadilla & etc., Verlag der Buchhandlung Walther König, Cologne, 2009.
- Lorz, Julienne. Allora & Calzadilla: Stop, Repair, Prepare. Cologne: Verlag der Buchhandlung Walther König, 2008.
- Miki, Akiko, et al. Allora & Calzadilla: Land Mark. Paris: Palais de Tokyo, 2006.
- Hernández Chong-Cuy, Sofia ed. Allora & Calzadilla, Ink, Monterrey and the Americas Society, New York, 2005.
- McKee, Yates. Common Sense? Boston: Institute of Contemporary Art, Boston|Institute of Contemporary Art, 2004.

=== Selected Articles and Reviews ===
- Bishop, Claire. "Delegated Performance: Outsourcing Authenticity." October, Spring 2012, 91.
- Rosenberg, Karen, “Going for the Gold,” Art in America, June–July 2011
- Yates McKee, "Wake, Vestige, Survival: Sustainability and the Politics of the Trace in Allora and Calzadilla's Land Mark," October #133, MIT Press, summer 2010.
- Smith, Roberta. "I Just popped Out to Play Beethoven." New York Times, December 9, 2010.
- Motta, Carlos. "Allora & Calzadilla", Bomb, no. 109 (Fall 2009): 65–71
- McDonough, Tom. "Use What Sinks: Allora & Calzadilla," Art in America, January, 2008, 82–86.
- Smolik, Noemi. "Allora & Calzadilla: Haus der Kunst / Kunstverein," Artforum, October 2008, 397–98.
- Charlesworth, J.J. “Allora & Calzadilla: Power Plays,” Art Review, London, Issue 15, October 2007.
- Feldman Hannah, Sound Tracks, Artforum, pp. 336–340, May 2007
- Grifin, Tim. "Remote Possibilities: A Round Tablet Discussion on Land Art's Changing Terrain." Artforum, Summer 2005, 288.
- Illes, Chrissie, Tirdad Zolghadr, and Ralph Rugoff. "Venice Biennial 2005." Frieze no. 93 (September 2005): 98–101
- Kastner, Jeffrey. "Two for the Show." Artforum, May 2005, 141.
- McKee, Yates.“Allora & Calzadilla. The monstrous dimension of art,” Flash Art, Milan, no. 240, January–February 2005.
- Obrist, Hans-Ulrich. "1000 Words: Allora and Calzadilla Talk about Three Places in Vieques." Artforum, March 2005, 204–5.
