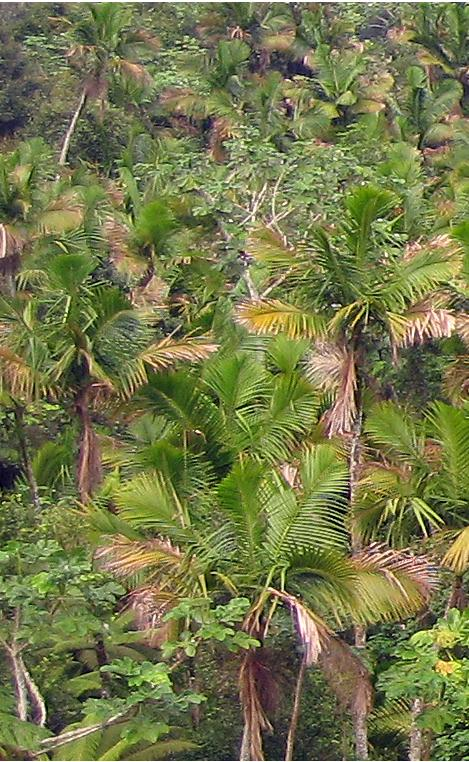
- Stand of Prestoea acuminata var. montana

Conservation status
- Least Concern (IUCN 3.1)

Scientific classification
- Kingdom: Plantae
- Clade: Tracheophytes
- Clade: Angiosperms
- Clade: Monocots
- Clade: Commelinids
- Order: Arecales
- Family: Arecaceae
- Genus: Prestoea
- Species: P. acuminata

Binomial name
- Prestoea acuminata (Willd.) H.E.Moore

= Prestoea acuminata =

Species of palm

Prestoea acuminata is a species of palm tree native to Central America, the West Indies and South America.

It was formerly widely harvested in Ecuador for palmito. However, the palm is now uncommon due to overharvesting and is no longer commercially harvested on a large scale.

== Subspecies ==
Three subspecies are accepted:

- Prestoea acuminata var. acuminata – Nicaragua, Costa Rica, Panama, Colombia, Ecuador, Peru, Bolivia, Venezuela, and Trinidad and Tobago.
- Prestoea acuminata var. dasystachys (Burret) A.J.Hend. & Galeano – Colombia and northwestern Venezuela.
- Prestoea acuminata var. montana (Graham) A.J.Hend. & Galeano – Cuba, Hispaniola, Puerto Rico, Leeward Islands, Windward Islands, Trinidad and Tobago.
