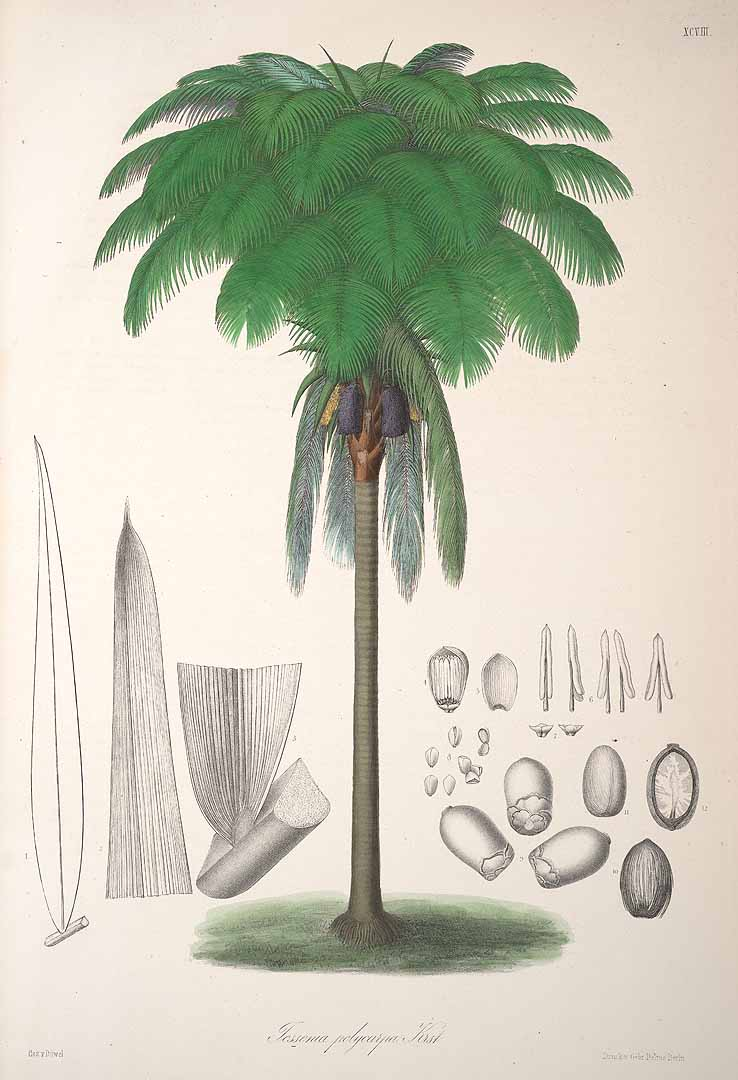

Scientific classification
- Kingdom: Plantae
- Clade: Tracheophytes
- Clade: Angiosperms
- Clade: Monocots
- Clade: Commelinids
- Order: Arecales
- Family: Arecaceae
- Genus: Oenocarpus
- Species: O. bataua

Binomial name
- Oenocarpus bataua Mart. 1823

Synonyms
- Jessenia bataua (Mart.) Burret (1929); Oenocarpus batawa Wallace (1853), spelling variation; Jessenia polycarpa H.Karst. (1857); Jessenia oligocarpa Griseb. & H.Wendl. ex Griseb. (1864); Jessenia repanda Engl. (1865); Jessenia weberbaueri Burret (1929); Jessenia oligocarpa Griseb. & H.Wendl. (1864); Oenocarpus oligocarpus (Griseb. & H.Wendl.) Wess.Boer (1965)

= Oenocarpus bataua =

Species of palm

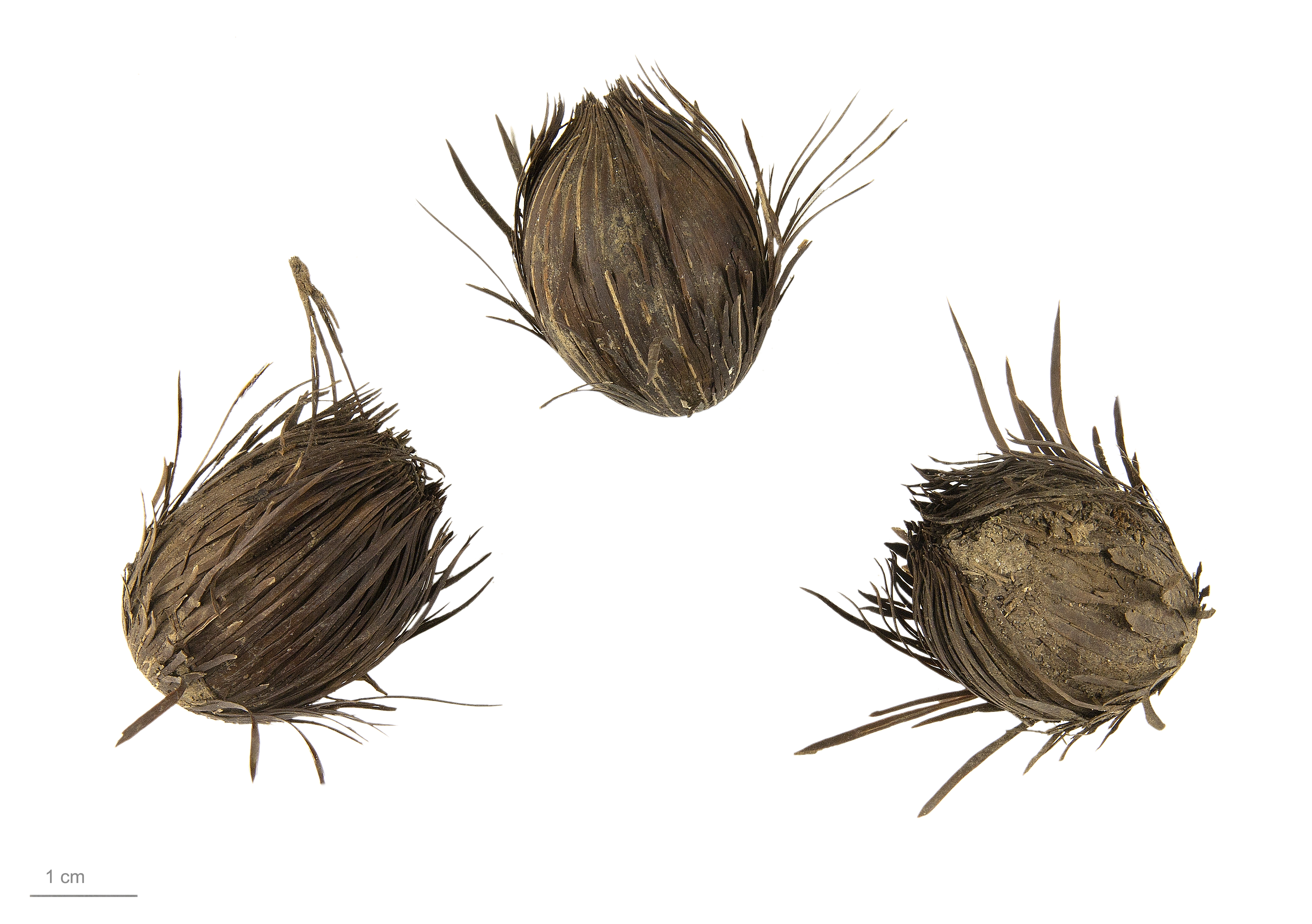
Oenocarpus bataua MHNT

Oenocarpus bataua, the patawa, sehe, hungurahua (Ecuador) or mingucha, is a palm tree native to the Amazon rainforest. The tree produces edible fruits rich in high-quality oil.

== Distribution and habitat ==
It is native to the tropical rainforests of South America and is abundant in the wet zones at elevations less than 1,000 m (3,300 ft). Its distribution stretches from Panama and Trinidad to the Amazon basin (Colombia, Venezuela, Guianas, Brazil, Bolivia, Ecuador, Peru). Two varieties are recognized:

1. Oenocarpus bataua var. bataua - Panama and South America
2. Oenocarpus bataua var. oligocarpus (Griseb. & H.Wendl.) A.J.Hend. - Trinidad, Venezuela, Guianas

In Western Amazonia, O. bataua is one of the top three palm species in both frequency and abundance. It reaches its highest densities in soils of low to intermediate nutrient concentration. In Colombia, it is usually found in sandy soils with a high organic matter content that are subject to flooding, possibly because there are few other species which compete with it. It can grow extremely well on unflooded soils as witnessed by high-density stands in the pastures of the Colombian Chocó, though it is rarely found on terra firma in the wild since competition from other species is such that it rarely gets the high light levels it needs to set fruit.

== Description ==
Its stem is solitary, erect, 10–25 m (33–82 ft) in height and 2–3 dm (8–12 in) diameter, smooth, and ring-shaped. It has 10–16 leaf terminals, petiole 10–50 cm (3.9–19.7 in), rachis 3–7 m (9.8–23.0 ft) long; with leaflets up to 2 m (6 ft 7 in) long and 15 cm breadth, approximately 100 to each side, placed in the same plane.

The blossom is 1–2 m (3 ft 3 in – 6 ft 7 in) long, with about 300 rachillae up to 1.3 m (4 ft 3 in) length. The flowers are yellow with sepals 2 mm (0.079 in) and petals 7 mm (0.28 in) long.

== Uses ==
Patawa fruits are used for cosmetic, food, and pharmaceutical purposes.

Traditionally indigenous peoples have collected the fruit and matured it in tepid water in order to prepare drinks and also to extract its oil. Its drupes are 8–10% oil. The rachis have been used to manufacture arrows and the leaves to make baskets and construct provisional housings. Additionally, Rhynchophorus palmarum larvae are harvested from the palm.

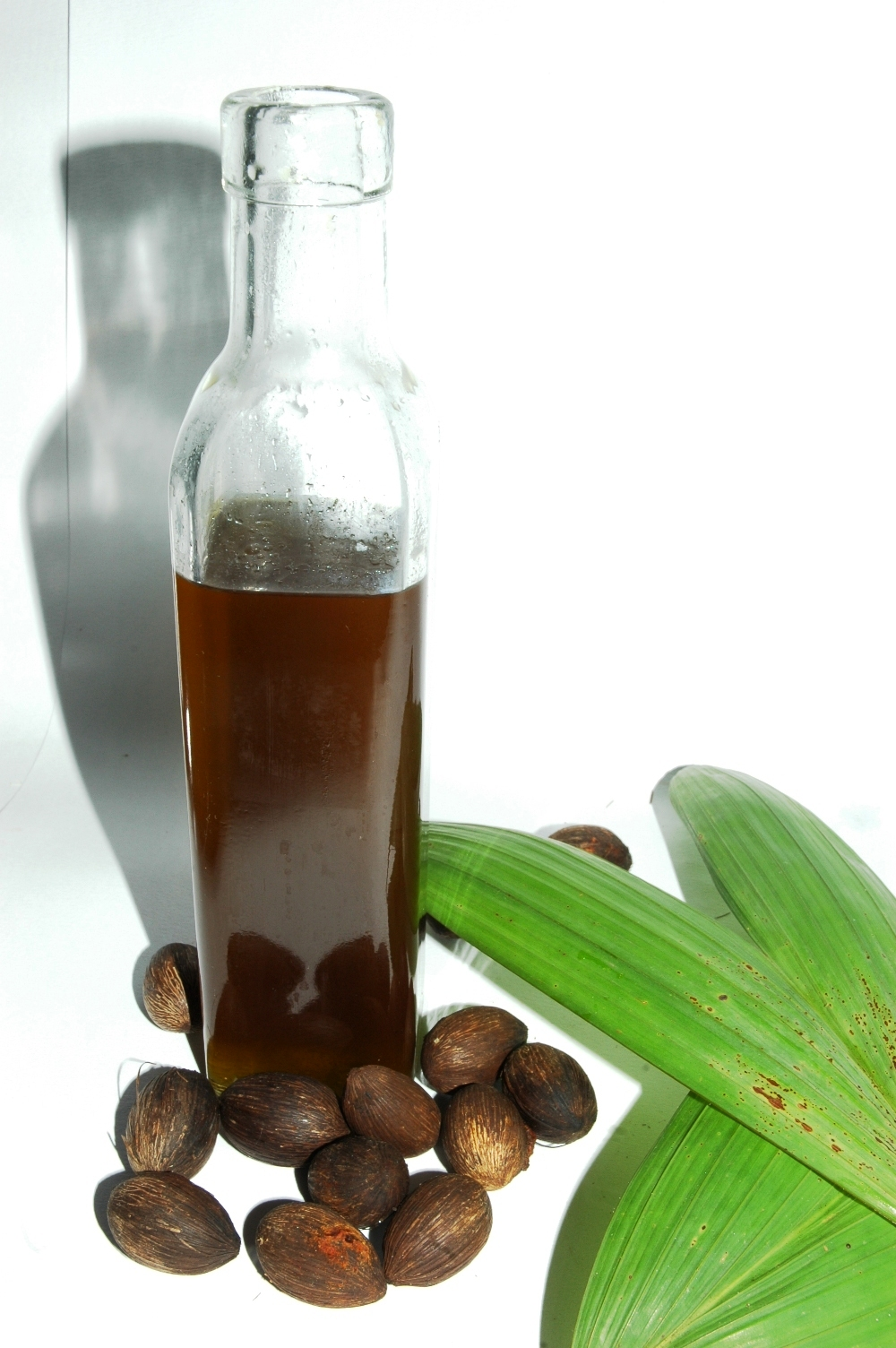
Pataua oil

== Oil ==
Onecarpus bataua in oil form is often called pataua oil. The oil is derived directly from the fruit and not the seed. The oil is contained inside the fruit, when the fruit is processed using pulp machines the oil is extracted from the fruit inside the pulp. At this point in the process the oil is free but it is still mixed in with the water and the proteins and fiber, the oil was stored inside the fruit until it was broken through mechanical force. The oil is then separated from the water after being heated, because of its hydrophobic nature it is centrifuged to speed up separation and then is pressed to squeeze the oil out of the pulp, and then the oil is skimmed from the surface.

The traditional uses include being a substitute as a wine fruit or just consumed as fruit or even as a substitute for acai, making it an important part of the local diet. The pataua oil in the kitchen is used in indigenous homes as frying oil along with a cooking oil and sometimes even dressing (leba 2016). The oil is also used for hair/scalp treatment, it can increase hair growth through its abundance of omega 9, It also contains linoleic acid which induces growth factor expression and boosts hair growth. In traditional communities it is also used to treat the scalp as it is rich in vitamin E which can fight dry scalp and build up. The local communities also use the oil to brighten and moisturize the skin to keep the skin healthy and help limit the aging of the skin. It has also been used in local communities as a topical treatment for pain relief, laxative, and as treatment for respiratory conditions.

The oil’s antioxidant properties give it a lot of potential on the commercial level, from being refined and potentially used as an anti-inflammatory medicine. It also has a wide range of cosmetic applications that it could potentially be used for. It could be used as a hair oil, skin moisturizer, and anti-aging formula because of its antioxidant properties and fatty acid composition. (Rezaire 2014)
