= Oenocarpus simplex =

Conservation status
- Data Deficient (IUCN 2.3)

Scientific classification
- Kingdom: Plantae
- Clade: Tracheophytes
- Clade: Angiosperms
- Clade: Monocots
- Clade: Commelinids
- Order: Arecales
- Family: Arecaceae
- Genus: Oenocarpus
- Species: O. simplex

Binomial name
- Oenocarpus simplex Bernal, Galeano & Henderson

Species of palm

Oenocarpus simplex is a species of flowering plant in the family Arecaceae. It is found only in Colombia and Panama.
