= Prestoea tenuiramosa =

Conservation status
- Near Threatened (IUCN 2.3)

Scientific classification
- Kingdom: Plantae
- Clade: Tracheophytes
- Clade: Angiosperms
- Clade: Monocots
- Clade: Commelinids
- Order: Arecales
- Family: Arecaceae
- Genus: Prestoea
- Species: P. tenuiramosa

Binomial name
- Prestoea tenuiramosa (Dammer) H.E.Moore

Synonyms
- Euterpe tenuiramosa Dammer; Prestoea steyermarkii H.E.Moore

Species of flowering plant

Prestoea tenuiramosa, the Guyana manicole palm or manacachilla, is a species of flowering plant in the family Arecaceae. It is found in Brazil, Guyana, and Venezuela.
