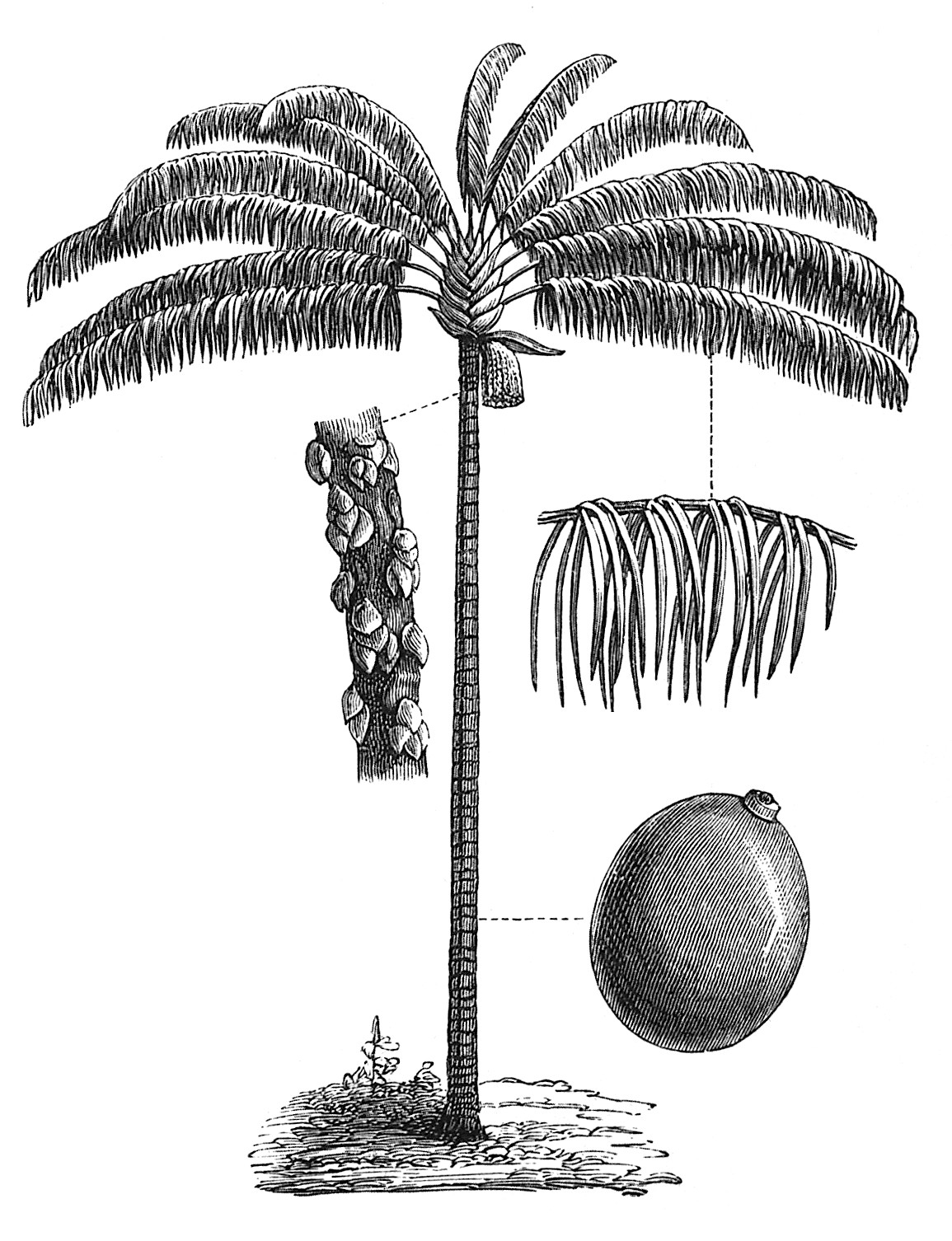
- Oenocarpus distichus illustration circa 1890

Scientific classification
- Kingdom: Plantae
- Clade: Tracheophytes
- Clade: Angiosperms
- Clade: Monocots
- Clade: Commelinids
- Order: Arecales
- Family: Arecaceae
- Subfamily: Arecoideae
- Tribe: Euterpeae
- Genus: Oenocarpus; Mart.

Synonyms
- Jessenia H.Karst.

= Oenocarpus =

Genus of palms

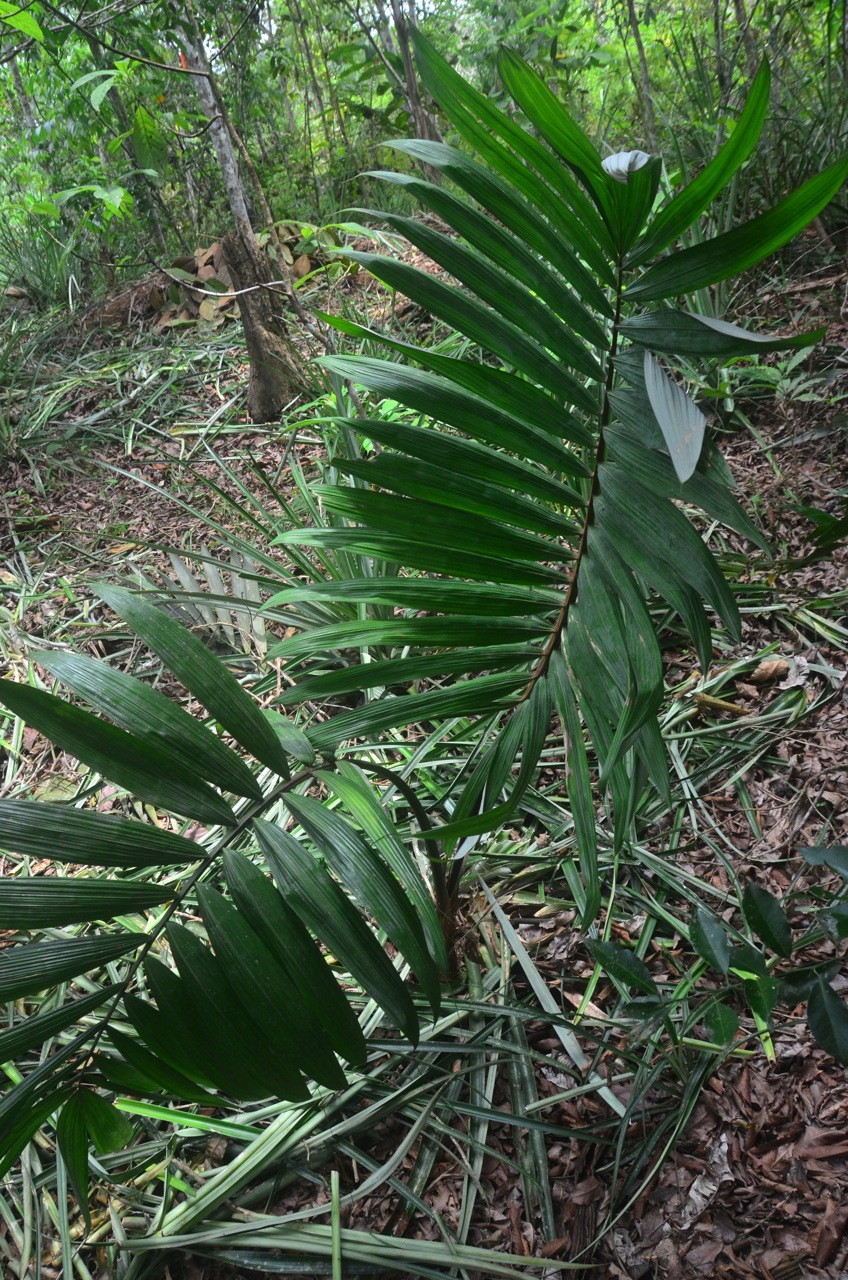
Oenocarpus mapora

Oenocarpus is a genus of pinnate-leaved palms (Arecaceae) native to Trinidad, southern Central and tropical South America. With nine species and one natural hybrid, the genus is distributed from Costa Rica and Trinidad in the north to Brazil and Bolivia in the south.

Common names in their native range are bacaba in Brazil, and palma milpesos (or just milpesos) in Spanish-speaking countries. These terms may also refer to the best-known member of this genus, O. bacaba, but more precise common names exist for that species.

The fruit of Oenocarpus palms are food for various animals, such as the green aracari (Pteroglossus viridis) for which O. bacaba fruit are a mainstay food. They are also locally eaten by humans, and these palms are also used in folk medicine. Their wood is useful for handicraft and the fruits can also be used to produce oil, which is of excellent quality and was used as a substitute for olive oil during WW2.

== List of species ==
The currently accepted species of Oenocarpus are:

- Oenocarpus × andersonii Balick - northwestern Brazil (O. bacaba × O. minor)
- Oenocarpus bacaba Mart, - Brazil, Venezuela, Colombia, the Guianas —bacaba açu, bacaba-de-leque, bacaba verdadeira (Brazil), manoco, punáma (Colombia), camon (French Guiana), ungurauy (Peru), koemboe (Suriname)
- Oenocarpus balickii F.Kahn — northwestern Brazil, Venezuela, Colombia, Ecuador - sinamillo
- Oenocarpus bataua Mart. — Panama, Trinidad, Brazil, Venezuela, Colombia, Ecuador, Peru, Bolivia, the Guianas - mingucha, ungurahui
- Oenocarpus circumtextus Mart. - Colombia, Amazonas State of Brazil
- Oenocarpus distichus Mart. - Bolivia, Peru, Brazil
- Oenocarpus makeru R.Bernal, Galeano & A.J.Hend. - Colombia
- Oenocarpus mapora H.Karst. - Brazil, Venezuela, Colombia, Ecuador, Peru, Bolivia, Panama, Costa Rica - (= O. multicaulis, O. panamanus)
- Oenocarpus minor Mart. - Colombia, Amazonas State of Brazil
- Oenocarpus simplex R.Bernal, Galeano & A.J.Hend. - Colombia, Amazonas State of Brazil
