= Dacey's Patent Automatic Nanny =

- Short story by Ted Chiang
- Language: English
- Genre: Science fiction

Publication
- Published in: The Thackery T. Lambshead Cabinet of Curiosities
- Publication type: Anthology
- Publication date: June 2011

"Dacey's Patent Automatic Nanny" is a science fiction novelette by American writer Ted Chiang, initially published in the 2011 anthology The Thackery T. Lambshead Cabinet of Curiosities edited by Jeff VanderMeer and Ann VanderMeer. It also appeared in the 2019 collection Exhalation: Stories.

== Plot summary ==
The story concentrates on different emotional relationships that humans develop with machines. Reginald Dacey argues that a mechanical nanny is much better able to raise a child than a human one. At first, society accepts the idea and many families buy automatic nannies, but when one malfunctions and kills a child, people lose interest. Dacey attempts to prove the machine is still safe by using the machine to raise his own child, when no one is willing to be the child's mother. When his son Lionel finally adopts an infant and raises it exclusively using the automatic nanny, the result is a child who is only capable of interacting with machines and not humans.

== Reviews ==
Adam Roberts wrote in The Guardian, that the novelette "is a clever piece of steampunk."
