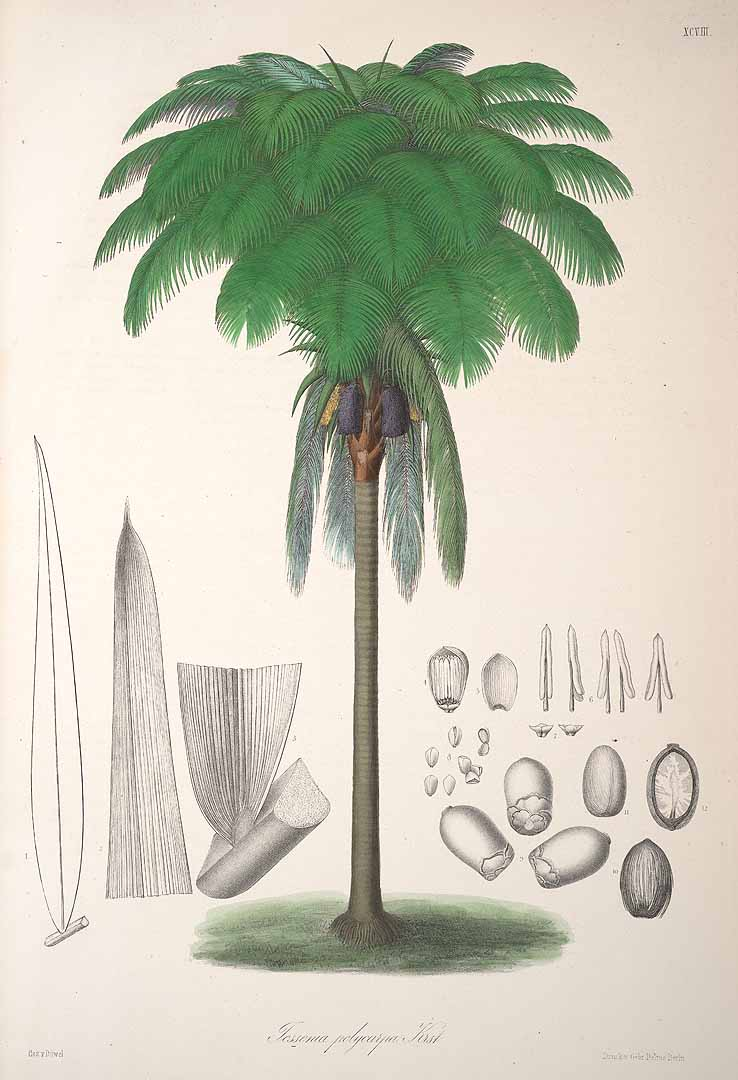
- Oenocarpus bataua

Scientific classification
- Kingdom: Plantae
- Clade: Tracheophytes
- Clade: Angiosperms
- Clade: Monocots
- Clade: Commelinids
- Order: Arecales
- Family: Arecaceae
- Subfamily: Arecoideae
- Tribe: Euterpeae

Type genus
- Euterpe

= Euterpeae =

Tribe of palms

Euterpeae is a tribe of Neotropical plants in the family Arecaceae. Genera in the tribe are:

- Hyospathe – northern South America
- Euterpe – South America, Central America
- Prestoea – northern South America, Caribbean
- Neonicholsonia – Central America
- Oenocarpus – South America

== See also ==
- List of Arecaceae genera
