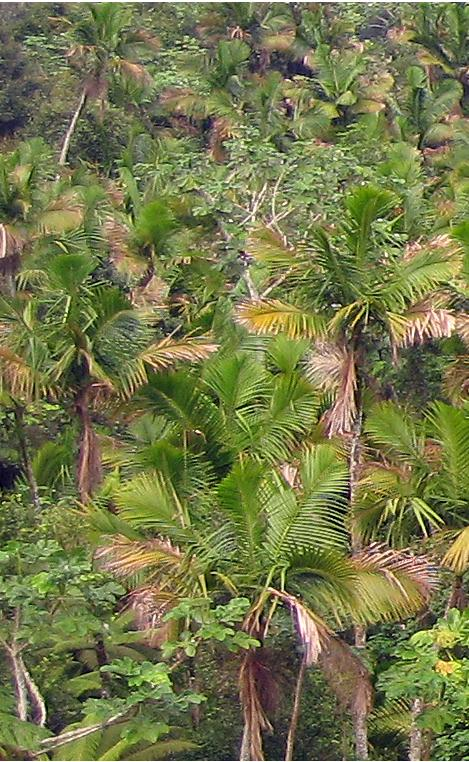
- Prestoea acuminata

Scientific classification
- Kingdom: Plantae
- Clade: Tracheophytes
- Clade: Angiosperms
- Clade: Monocots
- Clade: Commelinids
- Order: Arecales
- Family: Arecaceae
- Subfamily: Arecoideae
- Tribe: Euterpeae
- Genus: Prestoea; Hook.f.

Type species
- Prestoea pubigera (Griseb. & H. Wendl.) Hook. f.

Diversity
- See text

Synonyms
- Euterpe Gaertn.; Martinezia Ruiz & Pav.; Oreodoxa Willd.; Acrista O.F.Cook

= Prestoea =

Genus of palms

Prestoea is a genus of palms native to the Caribbean, Central and South America. Its range extends from Nicaragua and the Greater Antilles in the north to Brazil and Bolivia in the south.

== Species ==
- Prestoea acuminata (Willd.) H.E.Moore - Central America (Costa Rica, Nicaragua, Panama), West Indies, northwestern South America (Colombia, Venezuela, Ecuador, Peru, Bolivia)
- Prestoea carderi (W.Bull) Hook.f. - Colombia, Venezuela, Ecuador, Peru
- Prestoea decurrens H.E.Moore - Costa Rica, Nicaragua, Panama, Colombia, Ecuador
- Prestoea ensiformis (Ruiz & Pav.) H.E.Moore - Costa Rica, Peru, Panama, Colombia, Ecuador
- Prestoea longipetiolata (Oerst.) H.E.Moore - Costa Rica, Nicaragua, Panama, Colombia, Venezuela
- Prestoea montana (Graham) G.Nicholson; (Willd.) H.E. Moore - Greater and Lesser Antilles
- Prestoea pubens H.E.Moore - Panama, Colombia
- Prestoea pubigera (Griseb. & H.Wendl.) Hook.f. - Venezuela, Trinidad
- Prestoea schultzeana (Burret) H.E.Moore - Costa Rica, Nicaragua, Panama, Colombia, Ecuador. Peru, Brazil
- Prestoea simplicifolia Galeano - Antioquia region of Colombia
- Prestoea tenuiramosa (Dammer) H.E.Moore - Venezuela, Guyana, Brazil
