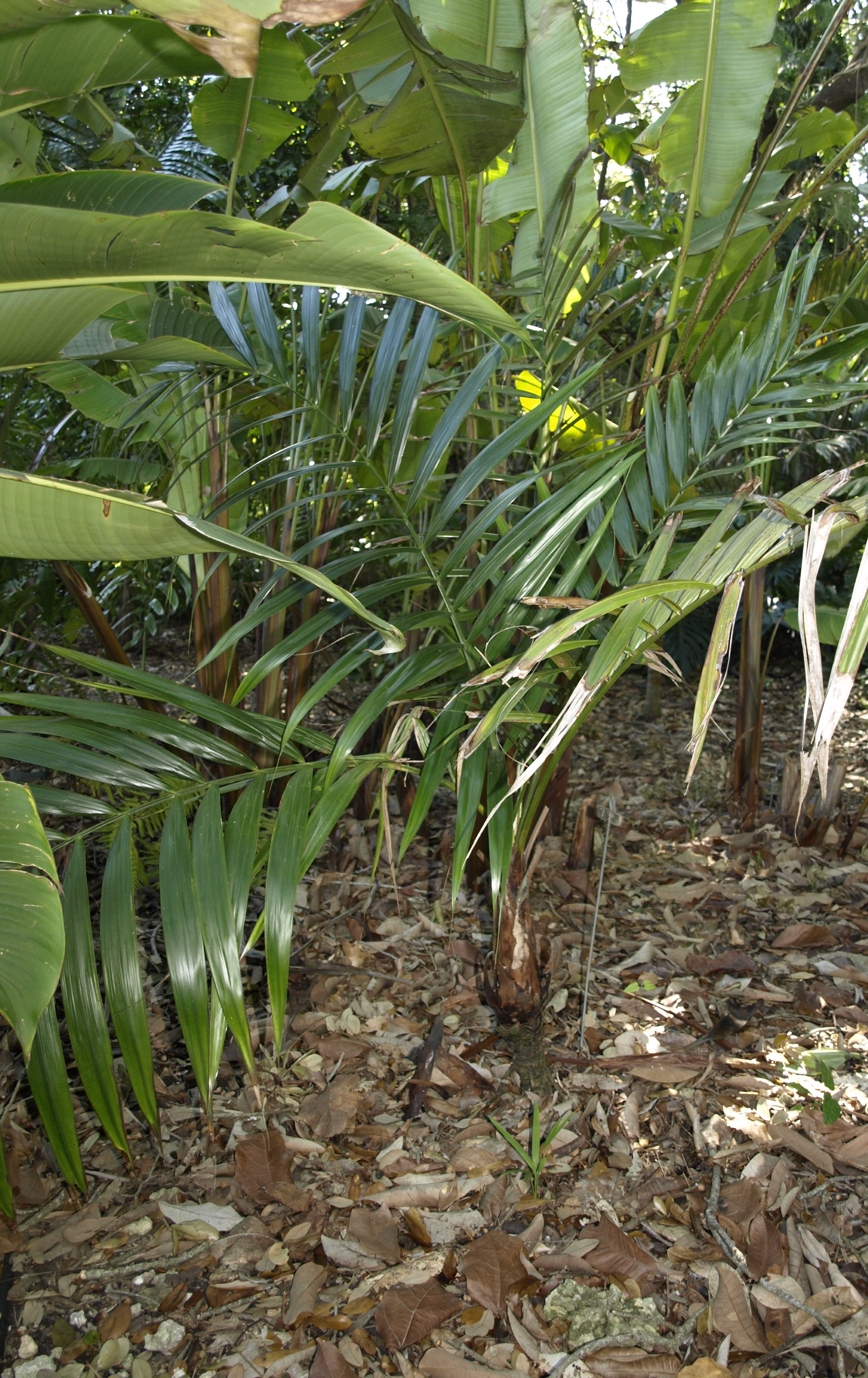

Scientific classification
- Kingdom: Plantae
- Clade: Tracheophytes
- Clade: Angiosperms
- Clade: Monocots
- Clade: Commelinids
- Order: Arecales
- Family: Arecaceae
- Subfamily: Arecoideae
- Tribe: Euterpeae
- Genus: Neonicholsonia; Dammer
- Species: N. watsonii

Binomial name
- Neonicholsonia watsonii Dammer

Synonyms
- Neonicholsonia georgei Dammer; Woodsonia scheryi L.H.Bailey

= Neonicholsonia =

Genus of palms

Neonicholsonia is a monotypic genus of flowering plant in the palm family native to Central America (Honduras, Nicaragua, Costa Rica, Panama). The sole species is Neonicholsonia watsonii. The genus and species names honor George Nicholson, a former curator of the Royal Botanic Gardens, Kew and his successor William Watson.

== Description ==
The trunk is solitary and acaulescent or barely emergent, producing 1.5 m leaves, pinnately cleft, with a gentle arch. The leaves are carried on short petioles, the leaflets grow to 30 cm, elliptical, and colored emerald green, and are widely and regularly arranged along the rachis. The inflorescence is a solitary, interfoliar spike with a long, slender peduncle, carrying male and female flowers. The fruit is ellipsoidal, black when ripe, with one globose seed.

== Distribution and habitat ==
Found in the rainforests from Nicaragua to Panama from sea level to 250 m.
