= Oenocarpus circumtextus =

Conservation status
- Vulnerable (IUCN 2.3)

Scientific classification
- Kingdom: Plantae
- Clade: Tracheophytes
- Clade: Angiosperms
- Clade: Monocots
- Clade: Commelinids
- Order: Arecales
- Family: Arecaceae
- Genus: Oenocarpus
- Species: O. circumtextus

Binomial name
- Oenocarpus circumtextus Martius

Species of palm

Oenocarpus circumtextus is a species of flowering plant in the family Arecaceae. It is found only in Colombia.
