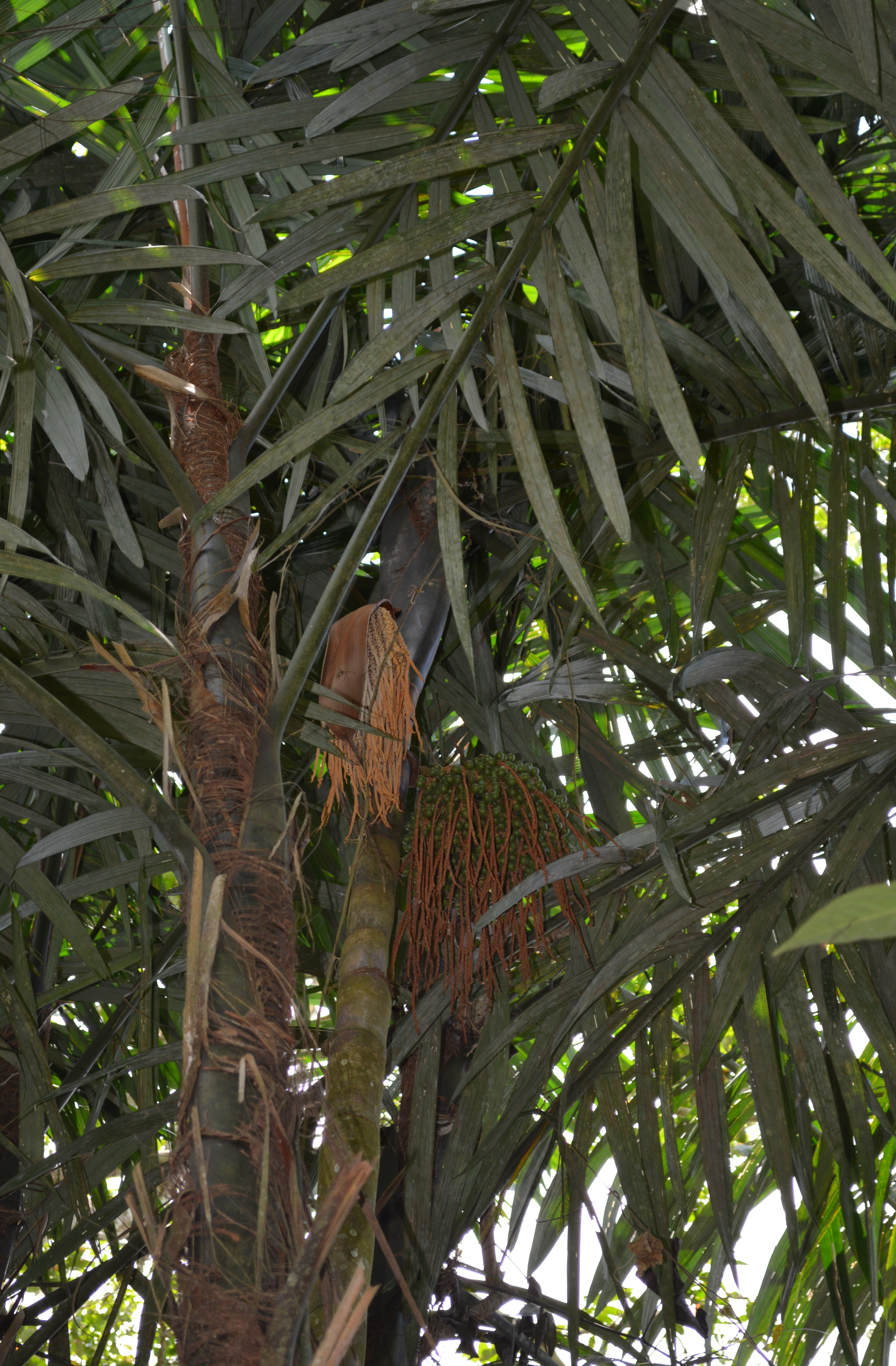

Scientific classification
- Kingdom: Plantae
- Clade: Tracheophytes
- Clade: Angiosperms
- Clade: Monocots
- Clade: Commelinids
- Order: Arecales
- Family: Arecaceae
- Genus: Oenocarpus
- Species: O. bacaba

Binomial name
- Oenocarpus bacaba Mart.

= Oenocarpus bacaba =

Species of palm

Oenocarpus bacaba is an economically important monoecious fruiting palm native to South America and the Amazon rainforest, which has edible fruits. This plant is cited in Flora Brasiliensis by Carl Friedrich Philipp von Martius. It can reach up to 20–25 metres tall and 15–25 cm in diameter. It grows in well-drained sandy soils of the Amazon basin.

== Names ==
It is called bacaba açu, bacaba-de-leque, and bacaba verdadeira in Brazil, ungurahui in Peru, camon in French Guiana, koemboe in Suriname, and manoco and punáma in Colombia. The Portuguese "bacaba" and the Spanish "milpesos" (or "palma milpesos") often denote this species, but may refer to any Oenocarpus palm. In English it has been called Turu palm.

== Fruit ==
Bacaba produces more fruits than any other palm in central Amazonia, averaging around 2500 per bunch. Bunches usually weigh about 3–4 kg, but can weigh up to 10 kg. The fruit is a drupe weighing up to 3.0 grams. Propagation is by seeds that germinate in 60–120 days, with slow growth. Production begins when the tree is 3–4 meters high, after about 6 years.

The fruit has a rounded dark red to purple shell and creamy white flesh, rich in oil of a pale yellow color. Bacaba fruit are cooked to prepare a juice which is much sought after by local people, though generally less popular than açaí. Bacaba fruit is agreeable and its flavor is reminiscent of avocado.

The fruits are rich in natural phenols, especially in flavonoids and their red color is due to cyanidin hexosides.

== Cultivation ==
The tree grows in well-drained sandy soils of the Amazon basin. Form optimal germination, seeds should be planted at a depth of 2 cm in sand and vermiculite, and the temperature kept around 30 °C. Seeds should be kept moist rather than wet.

== Other information ==
The seeds and the remains of the macerated pulp are fed to pigs and poultry. Leaves are used for house interiors while trunks provide tough wood suitable for construction.

The capital of Amapá, Macapá, also received influence in its name, whose toponymy is of Tupi origin, as a variation of "macapaba", which means "place of many bacabas". The city of Bacabal in Maranhão was so called because of the large amount of existing Bacaba fruit there.
