= The Great Silence (short story) =

2015 science fiction short story by Ted Chiang

- Short story by Ted Chiang
- Language: English
- Genre: Science fiction

Publication
- Published in: e-flux Journal
- Publication type: Magazine
- Publication date: May 2015

"The Great Silence" is a science fiction short story by American writer Ted Chiang that originated as the onscreen text for a video installation of the same name created in collaboration with Allora & Calzadilla. It was initially published as a story in e-flux Journal in May 2015. The story also appeared in the 2016 anthology The Best American Short Stories and in the 2019 collection Exhalation: Stories.

== Plot summary ==
The structure of this short story is a fable told from the point of view of a Puerto Rican parrot, a critically endangered species endemic to Puerto Rico. It describes the country's Arecibo radio telescope and how, in 1974, it was used to broadcast the Arecibo Message into deep space to demonstrate humanity's intelligence.

The parrot likens this message to the contact call of some social animals, attempting to similarly get the attention of other lifeforms, while noting that parrots' intelligence has largely been overlooked. It describes Alex, a grey parrot famous among humans for its ability to communicate, as an exception.

The fable culminates in describing the parrots' imminent extinction, and what they would like to communicate to humanity first.

== See also ==
- Fermi Paradox, a seemingly paradoxical absence of evidence for extraterrestrial intelligence.
- Irene Pepperberg, the animal cognition scientist, whose work with Alex is referenced in the story.
