= Hugo Award for Best Semiprozine =

Annual awards for science fiction or fantasy

- Awarded for: The best semi-professional magazine devoted primarily to science fiction or fantasy
- Presented by: World Science Fiction Society
- First award: 1984
- Most recent winner: Uncanny Magazine edited by Michael Thomas
- Website: thehugoawards.org

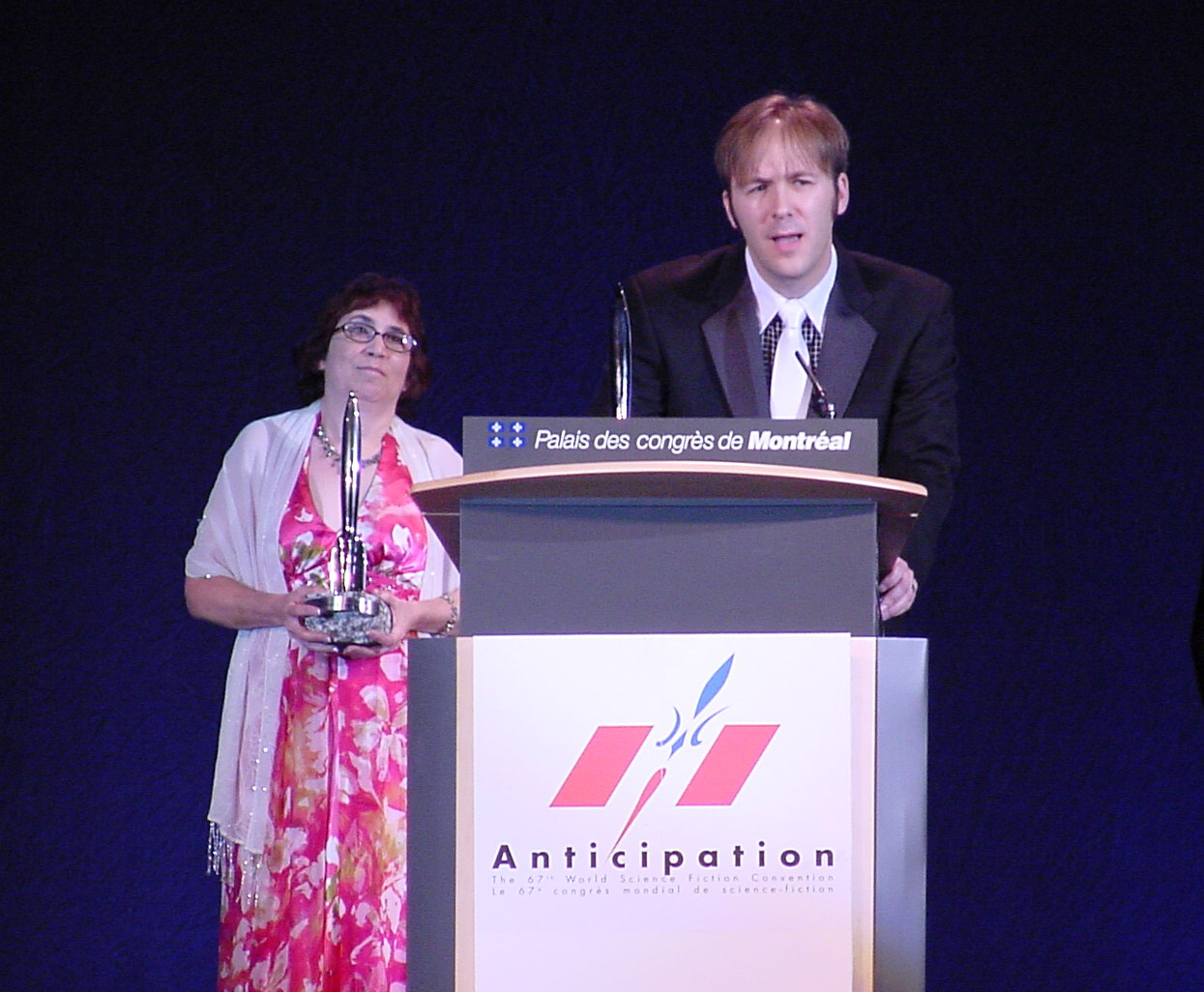
Stephen H. Segal accepting the 2009 Hugo Award for Best Semiprozine for Weird Tales

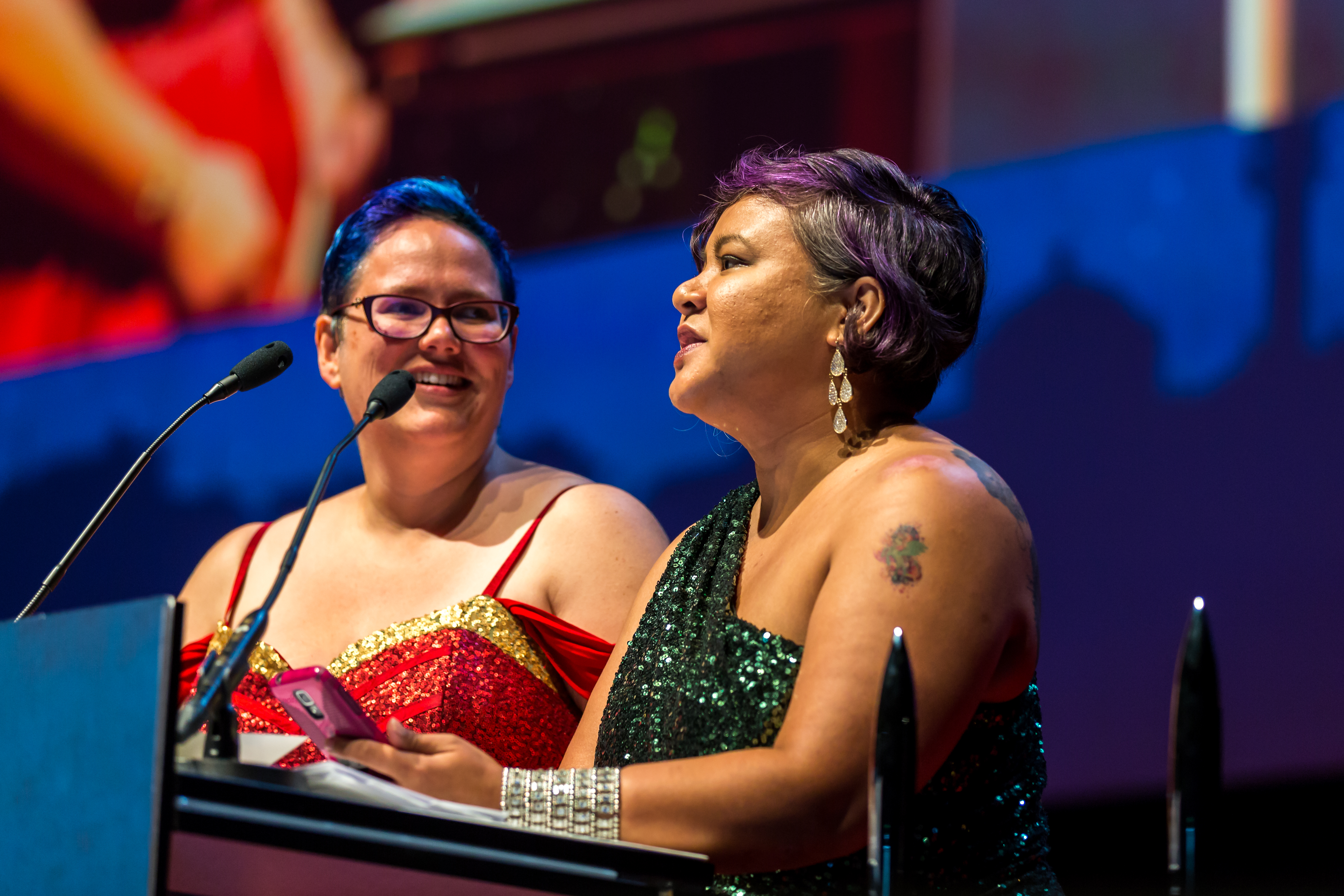
Julia Rios and Michi Trota accepting the 2017 Hugo Award for Best Semiprozine for Uncanny Magazine

The Hugo Award for Best Semiprozine is given each year to a periodical publication related to science fiction or fantasy that meets several criteria having to do with the number of issues published and who, if anyone, receives payment. The award was first presented in 1984, and has been given annually since, though the qualifying criteria have changed. Awards were once also given out for professional magazines in the professional magazine category, and are still awarded for fan magazines in the fanzine category.

In addition to the regular Hugo awards, between 1996 and 2025, Retrospective Hugo Awards or "Retro-Hugos" were available for works published 50, 75, or 100 years prior. Retro-Hugos could only be awarded for years after 1939 in which no awards were originally given. Retro-Hugo awards were awarded for 1939, 1941, 1943–1946, 1951, and 1954, but for each of those years, the Semiprozine category failed to receive enough nominating votes to form a ballot.

At the 2008 business meeting, an amendment to the World Science Fiction Society's Constitution was passed that would have removed the Semiprozine category. The vote to ratify this amendment was held the following year; the ratification failed and the category remained. Instead, a committee was formed to recommend improvements to the category and related categories.

== History of winners and finalists ==
During the 43 nomination years, 42 magazines run by hundreds of editors have been finalists. Of these, only 10 magazines run by 32 editors have won. Locus won 22 times and was a finalist every year until a rules change in 2012 made it ineligible for the category. Uncanny Magazine has won 9 times out of 12 final ballot nominations, including 5 times in a row in 2016–2020, while Science Fiction Chronicle, Clarkesworld Magazine, and Lightspeed are the only other magazines to win more than once, with 2 awards out of 18 nominations, 3 out of 4, and 2 out of 5, respectively. Interzone has won 1 out of 28 nominations, Ansible and FIYAH Magazine of Black Speculative Fiction have each won 1 out of 7 nominations, and Weird Tales won 1 out of 4. As editor of Locus Charles N. Brown won 21 of 27 nominations, though he shared 5 of those awards with Kirsten Gong-Wong, 3 with Liza Groen Trombi and 2 with Jennifer A. Hall; as Locus editor Liza Groen Trombi won 1 shared with Kirsten Gong-Wong. Uncanny's awards were primarily earned by a team of 5 people, Lynne M. Thomas, Michael Damian Thomas, Michi Trota, Erika Ensign, and Steven Schapansky. The sole editor for Chronicle's awards was Andrew I. Porter, while David Pringle earned Interzone's, and Ann VanderMeer and Stephen H. Segal were the editors for Weird Tales's victory. Lightspeed's wins were under John Joseph Adams, Rich Horton, and Stefan Rudnicki, with Wendy N. Wagner and Christie Yant added for the second win, while David Langford was the editor when Ansible was awarded. Clarkesworld Magazine's winning years were under Neil Clarke, Sean Wallace, and Kate Baker, with 2 of the three also under Cheryl Morgan and the other under Jason Heller. FIYAH's win was under Troy L. Wiggins, DaVaun Sanders, Eboni Dunbar, Brandon O'Brien, Brent Lambert, and L. D. Lewis. Strange Horizons's win was under "The Strange Horizons Editorial Collective". The New York Review of Science Fiction has received the most number of nominations without ever winning at 22, under the helm of David G. Hartwell, Kathryn Cramer, Kevin J. Maroney, and 8 other editors.

== The Hugo Award nomination process ==
Hugo Award nominees and winners are chosen by supporting or attending members of the annual World Science Fiction Convention (Worldcon). The selection process is defined in the World Science Fiction Society Constitution as instant-runoff voting among six finalists, or more in the case of a tie. The works on the ballot are the ones nominated by members that year, ranked according to a complex algorithm, with no limit on the number of works that can be nominated. The 1953 through 1956 and 1958 awards did not include any recognition of runner-up magazines, but since 1959 all six candidates were recorded. Initial nominations are made by members in the first months of each year, while voters vote on the ballot of six finalists in the middle of the year, with exact timing varying from year to year. Prior to 2017, the final ballot consisted of five works; it was changed that year to six, with each initial nominator limited to five nominations.

== Winners and finalists ==
In the following table, the years correspond to the date of the ceremony, rather than when the work was first published. Each date links to the "year in literature" article corresponding with when the work was eligible. Entries with a yellow background won the award for that year; those with a gray background are the other finalists on the short-list. Note that Thrust was renamed to Quantum and was nominated under both names; no other magazine has been a finalist under multiple names.

* Winners and joint winners

Winners and finalists
Year	Work	Editor(s)	Ref.
1984	Locus*	Charles N. Brown	
1984	Fantasy Review	Robert A. Collins	
1984	Science Fiction Chronicle	Andrew I. Porter	
1984	Science Fiction Review	Richard E. Geis	
1984	Whispers	Stuart David Schiff	
1985	Locus*	Charles N. Brown	
1985	Fantasy Review	Robert A. Collins	
1985	Science Fiction Chronicle	Andrew I. Porter	
1985	Science Fiction Review	Richard E. Geis	
1985	Whispers	Stuart David Schiff	
1986	Locus*	Charles N. Brown	
1986	Fantasy Review	Robert A. Collins	
1986	Interzone	Simon Ounsley and David Pringle	
1986	Science Fiction Chronicle	Andrew I. Porter	
1986	Science Fiction Review	Richard E. Geis	
1987	Locus*	Charles N. Brown	
1987	Fantasy Review	Robert A. Collins	
1987	Interzone	Simon Ounsley and David Pringle	
1987	Science Fiction Review	Richard E. Geis	
1987	Science Fiction Chronicle	Andrew I. Porter	
1988	Locus*	Charles N. Brown	
1988	Aboriginal Science Fiction	Charles C. Ryan	
1988	Interzone	Simon Ounsley and David Pringle	
1988	Science Fiction Chronicle	Andrew I. Porter	
1988	Thrust	Doug Fratz	
1989	Locus*	Charles N. Brown	
1989	Interzone	David Pringle	
1989	The New York Review of Science Fiction	David G. Hartwell, Patrick Nielsen Hayden, Teresa Nielsen Hayden, Susan Palwick, and Kathryn Cramer	
1989	Science Fiction Chronicle	Andrew I. Porter	
1989	Thrust	Doug Fratz	
1990	Locus*	Charles N. Brown	
1990	Interzone	David Pringle	
1990	The New York Review of Science Fiction	David G. Hartwell, Patrick Nielsen Hayden, Teresa Nielsen Hayden, Susan Palwick, and Kathryn Cramer	
1990	Science Fiction Chronicle	Andrew I. Porter	
1990	Thrust	Doug Fratz	
1991	Locus*	Charles N. Brown	
1991	Interzone	David Pringle	
1991	The New York Review of Science Fiction	Kathryn Cramer, David G. Hartwell, and Gordon Van Gelder	
1991	Quantum	Doug Fratz	
1991	Science Fiction Chronicle	Andrew I. Porter	
1992	Locus*	Charles N. Brown	
1992	Interzone	David Pringle	
1992	The New York Review of Science Fiction	Kathryn Cramer, David G. Hartwell, and Gordon Van Gelder	
1992	Pulphouse: The Hardback Magazine	Kristine Kathryn Rusch and Dean Wesley Smith	
1992	Science Fiction Chronicle	Andrew I. Porter	
1993	Science Fiction Chronicle*	Andrew I. Porter	
1993	Interzone	David Pringle	
1993	Locus	Charles N. Brown	
1993	The New York Review of Science Fiction	Kathryn Cramer, David G. Hartwell, Ariel Haméon, and Tad Dembinski	
1993	Pulphouse: The Hardback Magazine	Dean Wesley Smith and Jonathan E. Bond	
1994	Science Fiction Chronicle*	Andrew I. Porter	
1994	Interzone	David Pringle	
1994	Locus	Charles N. Brown	
1994	The New York Review of Science Fiction	Kathryn Cramer, David G. Hartwell, Ariel Haméon, and Tad Dembinski	
1994	Pulphouse: The Hardback Magazine	Dean Wesley Smith and Jonathan E. Bond	
1994	Tomorrow Speculative Fiction	Algis Budrys	
1995	Interzone*	David Pringle	
1995	Locus	Charles N. Brown	
1995	The New York Review of Science Fiction	Kathryn Cramer, David G. Hartwell, Ariel Haméon, and Tad Dembinski	
1995	Science Fiction Chronicle	Andrew I. Porter	
1995	Tomorrow Speculative Fiction	Algis Budrys	
1996	Locus*	Charles N. Brown	
1996	Crank!	Bryan Cholfin	
1996	Interzone	David Pringle	
1996	The New York Review of Science Fiction	Kathryn Cramer, David G. Hartwell, Ariel Haméon, and Tad Dembinski	
1996	Science Fiction Chronicle	Andrew I. Porter	
1997	Locus*	Charles N. Brown	
1997	Interzone	David Pringle	
1997	The New York Review of Science Fiction	Kathryn Cramer, Tad Dembinski, Ariel Haméon, David G. Hartwell, and Kevin J. Maroney	
1997	Science Fiction Chronicle	Andrew I. Porter	
1997	Speculations	Kent Brewster	
1998	Locus*	Charles N. Brown	
1998	Interzone	David Pringle	
1998	The New York Review of Science Fiction	Kathryn Cramer, Ariel Haméon, David G. Hartwell, and Kevin J. Maroney	
1998	Science Fiction Chronicle	Andrew I. Porter	
1998	Speculations	Kent Brewster	
1999	Locus*	Charles N. Brown	
1999	Interzone	David Pringle	
1999	The New York Review of Science Fiction	Kathryn Cramer, Ariel Haméon, David G. Hartwell, and Kevin J. Maroney	
1999	Science Fiction Chronicle	Andrew I. Porter	
1999	Speculations	Kent Brewster	
2000	Locus*	Charles N. Brown	
2000	Interzone	David Pringle	
2000	The New York Review of Science Fiction	Kathryn Cramer, Ariel Haméon, David G. Hartwell, and Kevin J. Maroney	
2000	Science Fiction Chronicle	Andrew I. Porter	
2000	Speculations	Kent Brewster	
2001	Locus*	Charles N. Brown	
2001	Interzone	David Pringle	
2001	The New York Review of Science Fiction	Kathryn Cramer, Ariel Haméon, David G. Hartwell, and Kevin J. Maroney	
2001	Science Fiction Chronicle	Andrew I. Porter	
2001	Speculations	Denise Lee and Susan Fry	
2002	Locus*	Charles N. Brown	
2002	Absolute Magnitude	Warren Lapine	
2002	Interzone	David Pringle	
2002	The New York Review of Science Fiction	Kathryn Cramer, David G. Hartwell, and Kevin J. Maroney	
2002	Speculations	Susan Fry and Kent Brewster	
2003	Locus*	Charles N. Brown, Jennifer A. Hall, and Kirsten Gong-Wong	
2003	Ansible	David Langford	
2003	Interzone	David Pringle	
2003	The New York Review of Science Fiction	Kathryn Cramer, David G. Hartwell, and Kevin J. Maroney	
2003	Speculations	Kent Brewster	
2004	Locus*	Charles N. Brown, Jennifer A. Hall, and Kirsten Gong-Wong	
2004	Ansible	David Langford	
2004	Interzone	David Pringle	
2004	The New York Review of Science Fiction	Kathryn Cramer, David G. Hartwell, and Kevin J. Maroney	
2004	Third Alternative	Andy Cox	
2005	Ansible*	David Langford	
2005	Interzone	David Pringle and Andy Cox	
2005	Locus	Charles N. Brown, Jennifer A. Hall, and Kirsten Gong-Wong	
2005	The New York Review of Science Fiction	Kathryn Cramer, David G. Hartwell, and Kevin J. Maroney	
2005	Third Alternative	Andy Cox	
2006	Locus*	Charles N. Brown, Kirsten Gong-Wong, and Liza Groen Trombi	
2006	Ansible	David Langford	
2006	Emerald City	Cheryl Morgan	
2006	Interzone	Andy Cox	
2006	The New York Review of Science Fiction	Kathryn Cramer, David G. Hartwell, and Kevin J. Maroney	
2007	Locus*	Charles N. Brown, Kirsten Gong-Wong, and Liza Groen Trombi	
2007	Ansible	David Langford	
2007	Interzone	Andy Cox	
2007	Lady Churchill's Rosebud Wristlet	Kelly Link and Gavin Grant	
2007	The New York Review of Science Fiction	Kathryn Cramer, David G. Hartwell, and Kevin J. Maroney	
2008	Locus*	Charles N. Brown, Kirsten Gong-Wong, and Liza Groen Trombi	
2008	Ansible	David Langford	
2008	Helix SF	William Sanders and Lawrence Watt-Evans	
2008	Interzone	Andy Cox	
2008	The New York Review of Science Fiction	Kathryn Cramer, Kristine Dikeman, David G. Hartwell, and Kevin J. Maroney	
2009	Weird Tales*	Ann VanderMeer and Stephen H. Segal	
2009	Clarkesworld Magazine	Neil Clarke, Nick Mamatas, and Sean Wallace	
2009	Interzone	Andy Cox	
2009	Locus	Charles N. Brown, Kirsten Gong-Wong, and Liza Groen Trombi	
2009	The New York Review of Science Fiction	Kathryn Cramer, Kristine Dikeman, David G. Hartwell, and Kevin J. Maroney	
2010	Clarkesworld Magazine*	Neil Clarke, Sean Wallace, and Cheryl Morgan	
2010	Ansible	David Langford	
2010	Interzone	Andy Cox	
2010	Locus	Charles N. Brown, Kirsten Gong-Wong, and Liza Groen Trombi	
2010	Weird Tales	Ann VanderMeer and Stephen H. Segal	
2011	Clarkesworld Magazine*	Neil Clarke, Sean Wallace, and Cheryl Morgan; podcast directed by Kate Baker	
2011	Interzone	Andy Cox	
2011	Lightspeed	John Joseph Adams	
2011	Locus	Liza Groen Trombi and Kirsten Gong-Wong	
2011	Weird Tales	Ann VanderMeer and Stephen H. Segal	
2012	Locus*	Liza Groen Trombi and Kirsten Gong-Wong	
2012	Apex Magazine	Catherynne M. Valente, Lynne M. Thomas, and Jason Sizemore	
2012	Interzone	Andy Cox	
2012	Lightspeed	John Joseph Adams	
2012	The New York Review of Science Fiction	David G. Hartwell, Kevin J. Maroney, Kris Dikeman, and Avram Grumer	
2013	Clarkesworld Magazine*	Neil Clarke, Jason Heller, Sean Wallace, and Kate Baker	
2013	Apex Magazine	Lynne M. Thomas, Jason Sizemore, and Michael Damian Thomas	
2013	Beneath Ceaseless Skies	Scott H. Andrews	
2013	Lightspeed	John Joseph Adams and Stefan Rudnicki	
2013	Strange Horizons	Niall Harrison, Jed Hartman, Lee Mandelo, An Owomoyela, Julia Rios, Abigail Nussbaum, AJ Odasso, Sonya Taaffe, Dave Nagdeman, and Rebecca Cross	
2014	Lightspeed*	John Joseph Adams, Rich Horton and Stefan Rudnicki	
2014	Apex Magazine	Lynne M. Thomas, Jason Sizemore, and Michael Damian Thomas	
2014	Beneath Ceaseless Skies	Scott H. Andrews	
2014	Interzone	Andy Cox	
2014	Strange Horizons	Niall Harrison, Lee Mandelo, An Owomoyela, Julia Rios, Abigail Nussbaum, AJ Odasso, Sonya Taaffe, Rebecca Cross, Anaea Lay, and Shane Garvin	
2015	Lightspeed*	John Joseph Adams, Stefan Rudnicki, Rich Horton, Wendy N. Wagner, and Christie Yant	
2015	Abyss & Apex Magazine	Wendy S. Delmater	
2015	Andromeda Spaceways Inflight Magazine	David Kernot and Sue Bursztynski	
2015	Beneath Ceaseless Skies	Scott H. Andrews	
2015	Strange Horizons	Niall Harrison	
2016	Uncanny Magazine*	Lynne M. Thomas, Michael Damian Thomas, Michi Trota, Erika Ensign, Steven Schapansky	
2016	Beneath Ceaseless Skies	Scott H. Andrews	
2016	Daily Science Fiction	Michele-Lee Barasso and Jonathan Laden	
2016	Sci Phi Journal	Jason Rennie	
2016	Strange Horizons	Catherine Krahe, Julia Rios, AJ Odasso, Vanessa Rose Phin, and Maureen Kincaid Speller	
2017	Uncanny Magazine*	Lynne M. Thomas, Michael Damian Thomas, Michi Trota, Julia Rios, Erika Ensign, and Steven Schapansky	
2017	Beneath Ceaseless Skies	Scott H. Andrews	
2017	Cirsova Heroic Fantasy and Science Fiction Magazine	P. Alexander	
2017	GigaNotoSaurus	Rashida J. Smith	
2017	Strange Horizons	Niall Harrison, Catherine Krahe, Vajra Chandrasekera, Vanessa Rose Phin, Li Chua, Aishwarya Subramanian, Tim Moore, and Anaea Lay	
2017	The Book Smugglers	Ana Grilo and Thea James	
2018	Uncanny Magazine*	Lynne M. Thomas, Michael Damian Thomas, Michi Trota, Julia Rios, Erika Ensign, and Steven Schapansky	
2018	Beneath Ceaseless Skies	Scott H. Andrews	
2018	The Book Smugglers	Ana Grilo and Thea James	
2018	Escape Pod	Mur Lafferty, S. B. Divya, Norm Sherman, and Benjamin C. Kinney	
2018	Fireside Magazine	Brian White, Julia Rios, Elsa Sjunneson-Henry, Mikki Kendall, and Pablo Defendini	
2018	Strange Horizons	Kate Dollarhyde, Gautam Bhatia, AJ Odasso, Lila Garrott, Heather McDougal, Ciro Faienza, Tahlia Day, and Vanessa Rose Phin	
2019	Uncanny Magazine*	Lynne M. Thomas, Michael Damian Thomas, Michi Trota, Erika Ensign, Steven Schapansky, Elsa Sjunneson-Henry, and Dominik Parisien	
2019	Beneath Ceaseless Skies	Scott H. Andrews	
2019	Fireside Magazine	Julia Rios, Elsa Sjunneson-Henry, Chelle Parker, Meg Frank, Tanya DePass, Brian White, and Pablo Defendini	
2019	FIYAH Magazine of Black Speculative Fiction	Troy L. Wiggins, DaVaun Sanders, L. D. Lewis, Brandon O'Brien, Kaleb Russell, Danny Lore, and Brent Lambert	
2019	Shimmer Magazine	Beth Wodzinski and E. Catherine Tobler	
2019	Strange Horizons	Jane Crowley, Kate Dollarhyde, Vanessa Rose Phin, Vajra Chandrasekera, Romie Stott, Maureen Kincaid Speller	
2020	Uncanny Magazine*	Lynne M. Thomas, Michael Damian Thomas, Michi Trota, Chimedum Ohaegbu, Erika Ensign, Steven Schapansky	
2020	Beneath Ceaseless Skies	Scott H. Andrews	
2020	Escape Pod	Mur Lafferty, S. B. Divya, Benjamin C. Kinney, Adam Pracht, Summer Brooks, Tina Connolly, Alasdair Stuart	
2020	Fireside Magazine	Julia Rios, Elsa Sjunneson, Chelle Parker, Meg Frank, Pablo Defendini, Brian White	
2020	FIYAH Magazine of Black Speculative Fiction	Troy L. Wiggins, Eboni Dunbar, Brent Lambert, L. D. Lewis, Danny Lore, Brandon O'Brien and Kaleb Russell	
2020	Strange Horizons	Vanessa Rose Phin, Catherine Krahe, AJ Odasso, Dan Hartland, Joyce Chng, Dante Luiz	
2021	FIYAH Magazine of Black Speculative Fiction*	Troy L. Wiggins, DaVaun Sanders, Eboni Dunbar, Brandon O'Brien, Brent Lambert, L. D. Lewis	
2021	Beneath Ceaseless Skies	Scott H. Andrews	
2021	Escape Pod	Mur Lafferty, S. B. Divya, Benjamin C. Kinney, Adam Pracht, Summer Brooks, Tina Connolly, Alasdair Stuart	
2021	PodCastle	C. L. Clark, Jen R. Albert, Setsu Uzumé, Peter Adrian Behravesh	
2021	Uncanny Magazine	Lynne M. Thomas, Michael Damian Thomas, Michi Trota, Chimedum Ohaegbu, Elsa Sjunneson, Erika Ensign, Steven Schapansky	
2021	Strange Horizons	Vanessa Rose Phin et al.	
2022	Uncanny Magazine*	Lynne M. Thomas, Michael Damian Thomas, Chimedum Ohaegbu, Elsa Sjunneson, Erika Ensign, Steven Schapansky	
2022	Beneath Ceaseless Skies	Scott H. Andrews	
2022	Escape Pod	S. B. Divya, Mur Lafferty, Valerie Valdes, et al.	
2022	FIYAH Magazine of Black Speculative Fiction	Troy L. Wiggins, DaVaun Sanders, et al.	
2022	PodCastle	Jen R. Albert, C. L. Clark, Shingai Njeri Kagunda, Eleanor R. Wood, et al.	
2022	Strange Horizons	The Strange Horizons Editorial Collective	
2023	Uncanny Magazine*	Lynne M. Thomas, Michael Damian Thomas, Chimedum Ohaegbu, Monte Lin, Meg Elison, Erika Ensign, Steven Schapansky	
2023	Escape Pod	Mur Lafferty, Valerie Valdes, Benjamin C. Kinney, Premee Mohamed, Tina Connolly, Summer Brooks, Adam Pracht	
2023	FIYAH Magazine of Black Speculative Fiction	The FIYAH team	
2023	khōréō	Team khōréō	
2023	PodCastle	Shingai Njeri Kagunda, Eleanor R. Wood, Sofia Barker, Matt Dovey, Peter Adrian Behravesh, Devin Martin, Eric Valdes	
2023	Strange Horizons	The Strange Horizons Editorial Team	
2024	Strange Horizons*	The Strange Horizons Editorial Collective	
2024	Escape Pod	Mur Lafferty, Valerie Valdes, Benjamin C. Kinney, Premee Mohamed, Kevin Wabaunsee, Tina Connolly, Alasdair Stuart, Summer Brooks, Adam Pracht, Escape Pod team	
2024	FIYAH Magazine of Black Speculative Fiction	DaVaun Sanders, B. Sharise Moore, L. D. Lewis, Christian Ivey, Rebecca McGee, Kerine Wint, Joshua Morley, Emmalia Harrington, Genine Tyson, Tonya R. Moore, Nelson Rolon	
2024	GigaNotoSaurus	LaShawn M. Wanak, Mia Tsai, Edgard Wentz, GNS Slushreaders Team	
2024	khōréō	Aleksandra Hill et al.	
2024	Uncanny Magazine	Lynne M. Thomas, Michael Damian Thomas, Monte Lin, Meg Elison, Erika Ensign, Steven Schapansky	
2025	Uncanny Magazine*	Lynne M. Thomas, Michael Damian Thomas, Monte Lin, Betsy Aoki, Erika Ensign, Steven Schapansky	
2025	The Deadlands	Sean Markey, E. Catherine Tobler, Nicasio Andres Reed, David Gilmore, Laura Blackwell, Annika Barranti Klein, Josephine Stewart, Amanda Downum, Cory Skerry, Christine M. Scott, Felicia Martínez, Shana Du Bois	
2025	Escape Pod	Mur Lafferty, Valerie Valdes, Benjamin C. Kinney, Premee Mohamed, Kevin Wabaunsee, Tina Connolly, Alasdair Stuart, Summer Brooks, Adam Pracht	
2025	FIYAH Magazine of Black Speculative Fiction	DaVaun Sanders, B. Sharise Moore, L. D. Lewis, Christian Ivey, Rebecca McGee, Kerine Wint, Joshua Morley, Emmalia Harrington, Genine Tyson, Tonya R. Moore, Nelson Rolon	
2025	khōréō	Zhui Ning Chang et al.	
2025	Strange Horizons	The Strange Horizons Editorial Collective	
2026	Uncanny Magazine*	Michael Damian Thomas, Monte Lin, Betsy Aoki, Erika Ensign, Steven Schapansky	
2026	Escape Pod	Mur Lafferty, Valerie Valdes, Kevin Wabaunsee, Phoebe Barton, Tina Connolly, Alasdair Stuart, Summer Brooks, Adam Pracht, Escape Pod team	
2026	khōréō	Zhui Ning Chang et al.	
2026	On Spec: The Canadian Magazine of the Fantastic	Diane L. Walton et al.	
2026	Strange Horizons	Strange Horizons Editorial Collective	
2026	The Deadlands	E. Catherine Tobler, Sean Markey, Nicasio Andres Reed, David Gilmore, Amanda Downum, Cory Skerry, Laura Blackwell, Annika Barranti Klein, Josephine Stewart, Christine M. Scott, Felicia Martínez	
