= Michael Damian Thomas =

American editor

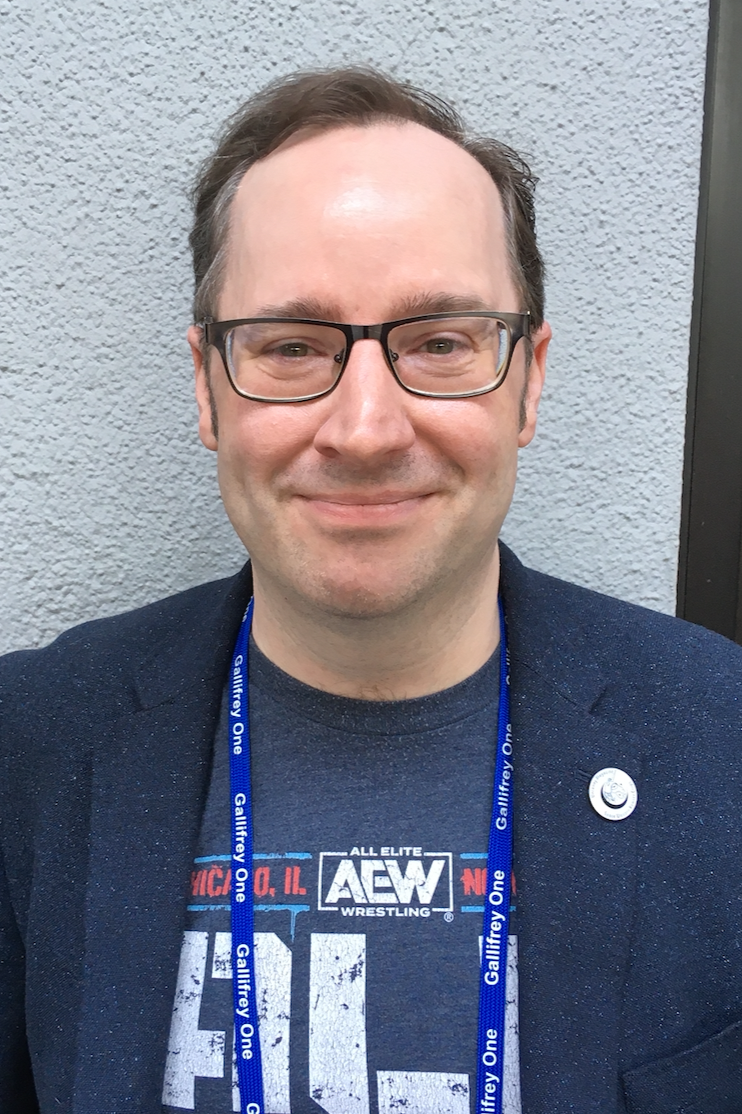
- Michael Damian Thomas in 2023
- Occupations: Editor, podcaster
- Known for: Uncanny Magazine
- Spouse: Lynne M. Thomas (div. 2025)
- Children: Caitlin Thomas

Michael Damian Thomas is an American magazine editor and podcaster. Thomas has won ten Hugo Awards (as of 2026), a World Fantasy Award, a British Fantasy Award, and a Parsec Award as co-publisher and co-editor-in-chief of Uncanny Magazine with Lynne M. Thomas. He was active as an advocate for disabled children in Illinois.

== Early life ==
Thomas graduated from the Illinois Mathematics and Science Academy (IMSA), a public magnet school in Aurora, Illinois, in 1992. In 2018, IMSA gave him the Alumni Titan Award, recognizing his contributions as "an enthusiastic and energetic champion who has invested significantly in the IMSA community". He graduated from Parkland College in 1998, and worked on the Parkland literary journal.

== Career ==
Thomas was managing editor at Apex Magazine from 2012 until 2013, and an associate editor at Mad Norwegian Press. In 2014, he and Lynne M. Thomas began Uncanny Magazine, as "a home for emotional, strongly written, experimental stories and provocative nonfiction" and poetry. He is co-host of the podcast of the same name, and has contributed to other podcasts, including the SF Squeecast with Elizabeth Bear, Paul Cornell, Seanan McGuire, and Catherynne M. Valente, and Down and Safe, a Blake’s 7 podcast with Amal El-Mohtar, Scott Lynch, and L. M. Myles.

Thomas has been the co-editor of several collections of stories and essays, including Glitter & Mayhem (2013 with John Klima and Lynne M. Thomas), and Queers Dig Time Lords: A Celebration of Doctor Who by the LGBTQ Fans Who Love It (2014, with Sigrid Ellis), and The Best of Uncanny (2019, with Lynne M. Thomas).

Thomas has taken a particular interest in disability issues. He chaired the City of DeKalb Advisory Commission on Disabilities and the DeKalb County Local Interagency Networking Council, and served on the planning committee of the Aicardi Syndrome Family Conference. In 2017, the Thomases and Mary Robinette Kowal crafted the "SF/F Convention Accessibility Pledge", a list of three basic accessibility requirements for signers' participation in conventions as participants, panelists, or guests. In 2018 and 2019, Uncanny Magazine published the theme issues Disabled People Destroy Science Fiction and Disabled People Destroy Fantasy, exclusively featuring the works of disabled editors and authors.

Thomas became sole editor and publisher of Uncanny Magazine in 2025. He is also content editor of Wil Wheaton's short fiction podcast, It's Story Time With Wil Wheaton.

== Bibliography ==
- with Sigrid Ellis (editors), Queers Dig Time Lords: A Celebration of Doctor Who by the LGBTQ Fans Who Love It (Mad Norwegian Press, 2013). ISBN 978-1935234142
- with John Klima and Lynne M. Thomas (editors), Glitter & Mayhem (Apex Publications, 2013). ISBN 978-1937009199
- with Catherynne M. Valente, Seanan McGuire and Elizabeth Bear, Harvest Season: An Anthology by the SF Squeecast (ISFiC Press, 2014). ISBN 978-0991002627
- with Lynne M. Thomas (editors), The Best of Uncanny (Subterranean Press, 2019). ISBN 978-1596069183

== Awards ==
Thomas has been nominated for multiple Hugo Awards between 2013 and 2026, for work on Apex Magazine, Uncanny Magazine, and the anthology Queers Dig Time Lords (2014). He has been nominated for the World Fantasy Award nine times (winning in 2024), and for Locus Awards nine times.

Awards won by Michael Damian Thomas include the following:

- 2016 Hugo Award for Best Semiprozine: Uncanny Magazine (with Lynne M. Thomas, Michi Trota, Erika Ensign, and Steven Schapansky)
- 2016 Parsec Award for Best Speculative Fiction Magazine or Anthology Podcast: The Uncanny Magazine Podcast (with Lynne M. Thomas, Erika Ensign, Amal El-Mohtar, C. S. E. Cooney, Deborah Stanish, and Steven Schapansky)
- 2017 Hugo Award for Best Semiprozine: Uncanny Magazine (with Lynne M. Thomas, Michi Trota, Julia Rios, Erika Ensign, and Steven Schapansky)
- 2018 Hugo Award for Best Semiprozine: Uncanny Magazine (with Lynne M. Thomas, Michi Trota, Julia Rios, Erika Ensign, and Steven Schapansky).
- 2018 Hugo Award for Best Editor Short Form (with Lynne M. Thomas)
- 2019 Hugo Award for Best Semiprozine: Uncanny Magazine (with Lynne M. Thomas, Michi Trota, Erika Ensign, Steven Schapansky, Elsa Sjunneson-Henry, and Dominik Parisien)
- 2019 British Fantasy Award for Best Magazine / Periodical (with Lynne M. Thomas, Michi Trota, Erika Ensign, Steven Schapansky, Elsa Sjunneson-Henry, and Dominik Parisien)
- 2020 Hugo Award for Best Semiprozine: Uncanny Magazine (with Lynne M. Thomas, Michi Trota, Chimedum Ohaegbu, Erika Ensign, Steven Schapansky)
- 2022 Hugo Award for Best Semiprozine: Uncanny Magazine (with Lynne M. Thomas, Chimedum Ohaegbu, Elsa Sjunneson, Erika Ensign, Steven Schapansky)
- 2023 Hugo Award for Best Semiprozine: Uncanny Magazine (with Lynne M. Thomas, Chimedum Ohaegbu, Monte Lin, Meg Elison, Erika Ensign and Steven Schapansky)
- 2024 World Fantasy Special Award—Non-professional (with Lynne M. Thomas) for Uncanny Magazine
- 2025 Hugo Award for Best Semiprozine: Uncanny Magazine (with Lynne M. Thomas, Monte Lin, Betsy Aoki, Erika Ensign, and Steven Schapansky)
- 2026 Hugo Award for Best Semiprozine: Uncanny Magazine (with Monte Lin, Betsy Aoki, Erika Ensign, and Steven Schapansky)

== Personal life ==
Beginning in 2017, the Thomases lived in Urbana, Illinois with their daughter Caitlin, who had Aicardi syndrome. Caitlin Thomas died in 2024, at the age of 21, at Lurie Children's Hospital. The Thomases announced their amicable divorce in a joint 2025 Instagram post. Thomas announced in a May 2026 podcast episode that he had recently remarried and was moving to Scotland in the summer of that year.
