= Science Fiction Awards Watch =

Science fiction awards blog

Science Fiction Awards Watch was a blog created in 2007 by Cheryl Morgan and Kevin Standlee, providing information on science fiction awards. It succeeded their fanzine Emerald City, which shut down in November 2006. The blog's objective was to report awards, give details about how the winners were selected, and foster reader interaction.

Notable contributors include John Clute, Joe Gordon, Chris Roberson, Anna Tambour, Jeff VanderMeer, and Gary K. Wolfe.

The blog had been noted as a source of "unbiased reporting and astute commentary" by science fiction author James Patrick Kelly in Asimov's Science Fiction Magazine.
