= Maurice Broaddus =

American novelist

- Broaddus at World Fantasy Convention 2026
- Born: London, England, U.K.
- Education: Purdue University (BS)
- Occupation: Writer
- Writing career
- Genres: Science fiction, Urban fantasy, Horror fiction
- Notable works: The Usual Suspects; Sweep of Stars
- Website: mauricebroaddus.com

Maurice Broaddus is an American author who has published fiction across a number of genres including young adult, horror, fantasy and science fiction. Among his books are The Knights of Breton Court urban fantasy trilogy from Angry Robot, the steampunk novel Pimp My Airship from Apex Publications, and the young adult novel The Usual Suspects from HarperCollins. His Afrofuturist space trilogy Astra Black was released by Tor Books beginning in 2022. He has also published dozens of short stories in magazines such as Asimov's Science Fiction, Black Static, Fantasy & Science Fiction, and Weird Tales along with anthologies including Black Panther: Tales of Wakanda, The Year's Best Science Fiction & Fantasy and Sunspot Jungle.

== Life ==
Broaddus was born in London, United Kingdom, but grew up in Indianapolis, United States. His mother is from Jamaica, where many of his relatives still live.

Broaddus earned a Bachelor of Science degree in Biology from Purdue University and worked for two decades as an environmental toxicologist. He was formerly the executive director of Cities of Refuge Ministries, which provides transitional housing and employment opportunities for people dealing with addiction, reentry, or homelessness. He currently works at the Oaks Academy Middle School as a teacher librarian and at the Kheprw Institute, a neighborhood association focusing on youth leadership development, community wealth building, and improving the lives of local residents.

He still resides in Indianapolis, where he lives with his wife and two sons.

== Writing ==
Broaddus has published dozens of short stories and hundreds of essays (including as a columnist for the Indianapolis Star and as a reviewer for HollywoodJesus.com). His fiction has been published in magazines such as Asimov's Science Fiction, Cemetery Dance, Fiyah Magazine of Black Speculative Fiction, Apex Magazine, Black Static, Weird Tales, Beneath Ceaseless Skies, and Fantasy & Science Fiction, along with stories in original and reprint anthologies such as Black Panther: Tales of Wakanda, The Year's Best Science Fiction & Fantasy and Sunspot Jungle.

In 2010 Angry Robot published Broaddus’ urban fantasy novel King Maker, a "retelling of the Arthurian mythos involving street gangs." The novel was called a "triumph" by SF Book Reviews and was followed up by two sequels, King's Justice and King’s War. In 2012 Angry Robot published the trilogy in an omnibus edition entitled The Knights of Breton Court.

His steampunk novella Buffalo Soldier was released in 2017 by Tor and was described by the New York Times Book Review as an "exciting" story packed with "alternate American history, fantastic technology and father-son bonding." His short story collection The Voices of Martyrs was released in 2016 by Rosarium Publishing. In a starred review, Publishers Weekly called the collection "evocative and moving" with "lush, descriptive prose (that) tantalizes all the senses."

In 2019 Broaddus sold his Afrofuturist space trilogy Astra Black to Tor. The first novel in the series, Sweep of Stars, was released in March 2022. His 2020 novella Sorcerers about a hip hop inspired sorcerer, is being adapted into a show by AMC Networks. Broaddus wrote the novella with "Otis Whitaker," a pseudonym for a collective of storytellers at NeoText, and illustrated by Jim Mahfood.

== Editing ==
Broaddus has also edited and co-edited several well-received anthologies, including Dark Faith (alongside fellow editor Jerry Gordon), which focused on the intersection between horror and religious faith. He also co-edited the "People of Colo(u)r Destroy Fantasy" and "People of Colo(u)r Destroy Horror" special issues of Fantasy and Nightmare magazines.

He also works as an editor at Apex Magazine.

In late 2020 Broaddus guest edited a special issue of Fireside Magazine dealing with grief and loss. One of the essays selected by Broaddus was "Da Art of Speculatin'" by Regina N. Bradley, which discussed how hip-hop duo Outkast "blended Black Southern life of the past and present in their music to paint possibilities of their lives in the future." Despite the first line of the essay identifying Bradley as a "southern Black woman who stands in the long shadow of the Civil Rights Movement," without the knowledge of Broaddus the magazine's publisher released an audio version of the essay narrated by a white man "who spoke in an accent that listeners interpreted as something that would appear in a minstrel show." The audio version was called "auditory blackface" and resulted in national media attention. The audio version was later deleted and the publisher apologized to Bradley and Broaddus.

== Awards ==
Broaddus, along with co-editor Jerry Gordon, was a finalist for the 2010 Bram Stoker Award for Best Anthology for Dark Faith and won the Kitschies award for debut novel for King Maker. He was also a finalist for the Black Quill Award.

His novel Pimp My Airship won the 2020 genre award at the 2022 Eugene and Marilyn Glick Indiana Authors Awards, presented by Indiana Humanities. Additionally, in 2024, Broaddus received two Indiana Author Awards for Best Middle Grade Novel titled Unfadeable and Genre Shortlist for Sweep of Stars.

In 2022 and 2026, Broaddus was a finalist for the Ember Award, given by the Ignyte Awards.

== Bibliography ==
=== Novels ===
- Astra Black trilogy
  - Sweep of Stars (Tor, March 2022)
  - Breath of Oblivion (Tor, November 2024)
  - A City Dreaming (Tor, June 2026)
- Pimp My Airship (Apex Publications, 2019)
- The Knights of Breton Court trilogy (reprinted in the omnibus edition The Knights of Breton Court, Angry Robot, 2012)
  - King Maker (Angry Robot, 2010)
  - King's Justice (Angry Robot, 2011)
  - King's War (Angry Robot, 2011)
  - Sweep of Stars (Macmillan Publishers, 2022)

=== Young adult novels ===
- Unfadeable (HarperCollins, April 2022)
- The Usual Suspects (Katherine Tegen/HarperCollins, 2019)

=== Short story collections ===
- The Voice of Martyrs (Rosarium Publishing, 2016)

=== Anthologies ===
- Streets of Shadows (Alliteration Ink, 2014, edited with Jerry Gordon)
- Dark Faith: Invocations (Apex Publications, 2012, edited with Jerry Gordon)
- Dark Faith (Apex Publications, 2010, edited with Jerry Gordon)

=== Novellas ===
- Sorcerers (NeoText, 2020, written with "Otis Whitaker," a pseudonym for a collective of storytellers, and illustrated by Jim Mahfood)
- Buffalo Soldier (Tor, 2017)
- I Can Transform You (Apex Publications, 2013)
- Bleed With Me (Delirium Books, 2011)
- Devil's Marionette (Shroud Publishing, 2009)
- Orgy of Souls (Apex Publications, 2008, co-authored with Wrath James White)

=== Selected short fiction ===
- "Abagail’s Gethsemane" (w/ Wayne Brady, The End of the World as We Know It: New Tales of Stephen King's The Stand, Gallery Books, 2025)
- "Babylon Systems" (Fantasy & Science Fiction, May/June 2021)
- "Black Panther – Kindred Spirits" (Black Panther: Tales of Wakanda, Titan Books, March 2021)
- "The Legacy of Alexandria" (Apex Magazine, November 2020)
- "City of Refuge" (Escape Pod 2020, reprinted in Lightspeed Magazine, August 2021)
- "The Migration Suite: A Study in C Sharp Minor" (Uncanny Magazine, July/August 2019, reprinted in The Year's Best Science Fiction & Fantasy 2020)
- "El is a Spaceship Melody" (Beneath Ceaseless Skies, February 2018)
- "What the Mountain Wants" (w/ Nayad Monroe, Do Not Go Quietly, Apex Publication, 2018)
- "The Valkyrie" (War Stories Anthology, Apex Books, 2014; reprinted in Starship Sofa, 2018)
- "Vade Retro Satana" (Fiyah Magazine of Black Speculative Fiction, Spring 2017; reprinted in Lightspeed Magazine, December 2018)
- "The Ache of Home" (Uncanny Magazine, July–August 2017)
- "At the Village Vanguard" (Mothership Zeta, October 2016; reprinted in Escape Pod)
- "Super Duper Fly" (Upside Down: Inverted Tropes in Storytelling, Apex Books, 2015; reprinted in Sunspot Jungle, Rosarium Publishing, 2018)
- "The Kwanzaa Kid" (Naughty or Nice: A Holiday Anthology, Evil Girlfriend Media, 2015)
- "Steppin' Razor" (Asimov's Science Fiction, February 2014)
- "The Electric Spanking of the War Babies" (co-written with Kyle S. Johnson, Glitter & Mayhem, Apex Publications, 2013)
- "Awaiting Redemption" (Eulogies II: Tales From the Cellar, edited by Christopher Jones, Nanci Kalanta, and Tony Tremblay, HW Press, 2013)
- "A Soldier's Story" (Vampires Don't Sparkle!, edited by Michael West, Seventh Star Press, 2012)
- "Being in the Shadow" (Appalachian Undead, edited by Jason Sizemore, Apex Publications, 2012)
- "Rainfall" (Cemetery Dance, #65, 2011)
- "Lost Son" (Griots: A Sword and Soul Anthology edited by Charles R. Saunders, Milton J. Davis, MVmedia, 2011)
- "The Problem of Trystan" (Hot and Steamy: Tales of Steampunk Romance, edited by Jean Rabe and Martin H. Greenberg, DAW Books, 2011)
- "I, Theodora" (Beauty Has Her Way, edited by Jennifer Brozek, Dark Quest Books, 2011)
- "A Stone Cast into Stillness" (Dark Futures edited by Jason Sizemore, Dark Quest Books, 2010; republished 2012)
- "Hootchie Cootchie Man" (Black Static, Issue 14, December 2009-January 2010)
- "Trouble Among the Yearlings" (Harlan County Horrors, edited by Mari Adkins, Apex Publications, 2009)
- "Closer Than They Appear" (Shroud 7: The Quarterly Journal of Dark Fiction and Art, Autumn 2009)
- "Pimp My Airship" (Apex Magazine, August 2009; reprinted in The Book of Apex: Volume 2 of Apex Magazine, 2010)
- "Rite of Passage" (Space and Time, Fall 2008)
- "Broken Strand" (Apex Science Fiction and Horror Digest, #12, 2008)
- "Family Business" (Weird Tales, January–February 2006)
- "Kali's Danse Macabre" (Honorable mention, 1996 Asimov's Undergraduate Award)
