= Mechanize My Hands to War =

2024 book

- Author: Erin K. Wagner
- Language: English
- Genre: Science fiction
- Publisher: DAW
- Publication date: December 17, 2024
- Pages: 322
- ISBN: 978-0756419356

Mechanize My Hands to War is a 2024 science fiction novel by American writer Erin K. Wagner.

== Publication history ==
The novel originated as an unpublished short story titled Ye Are the Children of Prophets, which Wagner described as "part of a discourse about both ancestry and descendants, heritage and children surpassing their parents."

== Themes and analysis ==
According to Melissa A Watkins of Lightspeed Magazine, the novel was "a look at how top-down adoption of new technology can influence regular people in very realistic ways, and how fear of what we may create can warp entire lives," as well as a "meditation on how what is made and what is felt can converge and separate, set against a rural, yet futuristic backdrop."

== Reception ==
Publishers Weekly gave the novel a starred review, describing it as "sharply imagined and all too plausible... Fans of C. Robert Cargill’s robot novels will be impressed." Josiah Brown of the Southern Literary Review described the novel as "intense and thought-provoking," praising the novel's character development and "Wagner's ability to blend emotion with complex world-building." Paul Di Filippo of Locus Magazine reviewed the novel as "a highly sophisticated tale, constructed in clever fashion," saying that although "Wagner’s sociological and technological speculations about androids and their uses hew pretty closely to the standard SF textbook," because "of its intense characterization, gripping prose, and general empathy for all concerned, it manages to delve very deeply into the topic—more so than many SF books that are concerned."

Niall Harrison, however, wrote that the novel's "telling is not unconventional enough to make it new," saying that it "does not read as a sharply political novel; its argument is framed broadly enough that I imagine most readers will nod along comfortably."
