= Ignyte Award — Community Award =

Annual award for speculative fiction

Ignyte Award – Community Award
- Awarded for: An individual, team, or organization whose focus has aided in diversifying and making healthier the field of speculative fiction by emphasizing inclusion.
- Country: United States
- Presented by: FIYAH Literary Magazine
- First award: 2020; 6 years ago
- Most recent winner: Strange Horizons
- Website: ignyteawards.fiyahlitmag.com

The Ignyte Award — Community Award is a literary award given annually as part of the Ignyte Awards.

== Winners and finalists ==
* Winners

Year	Winners & Finalists	Author(s), if applicable	Ref.
2020	Strange Horizons*	Gautam Bhatia, Vajra Chandrasekera, Joyce Chng, Kate Cowan, Tahlia Day, William Ellwood, Rebecca Evans, Ciro Faienza, Lila Garrott, Dan Hartland, Amanda Jean, Lulu Kadhim, Maureen Kincaid Speller, Catherine Krahe, Anaea Lay, Dante Luiz, Heather McDougal, AJ Odasso, Vanessa Rose Phin, Clark Seanor, Romie Stott, Aishwarya Subramanian, Fred G. Yost, the Strange Horizons copyediting team, and first readers.	
2020	Beth Phelan	—	
2020	Mary Robinette Kowal	—	
2020	Diana M. Pho	—	
2020	Writing the Other	Nisi Shawl and K. Tempest Bradford	
2021	#PublishingPaidMe*	L.L. McKinney and Tochi Onyebuchi	
2021	Anathema Magazine: Spec from the Margins	Michael Matheson, Andrew Wilmot, and Chinelo Onwualu	
2021	Beth Phalen	—	
2021	Diana M. Pho	—	
2021	Writing the Other	Nisi Shawl and K. Tempest Bradford	
2022	The Submission Grinder*	David Steffen	
2022	Anathema Magazine: Spec from the Margins	Michael Matheson, Andrew Wilmot, and Chinelo Onwualu	
2022	dave ring	—	
2022	Khōréō	Aleksandra Hill and Team	
2022	We Need Diverse Books	—	
2023	Flights of Foundry*	—	
2023	Carl Brandon Society	—	
2023	Clarion West Writers Workshop	—	
2023	Loyalty Bookstore's Crowdcast	—	
2023	dave ring	—	
2024	Khōréō*	The Khōréō Team	
2024	Awesome Black	Awesome Black Team	
2024	Samovar Magazine	Laura Friis, Sarah Dodd, and Greg West	
2024	Stone Soup: The Personal Canons Cookbook	Sarah Gailey	
2024	Voodoonauts Summer Fellowship	Shingai Njeri Kagunda, Yvette Lisa Ndlovu, LP Kindred, and Hugh “H.D” Hunter	
2025	Authors Against Book Bans*		
2025	Samovar Magazine	—	
2025	Writing the Other: Workshops	—	
2025	Wole Talabi	—	
2026	Strange Horizons*	—	
2026	Augur	—	
2026	Genre Grapevine	Jason Sanford	
2026	Sistah Scifi	—	
2026	Will This Be a Problem?	—	
