= Lynne M. Thomas =

American librarian and editor

- Occupations: Librarian, editor, archivist
- Spouse: Michael Damian Thomas (div. 2025)
- Children: Caitlin Thomas
- Writing career
- Language: English
- Notable works: Uncanny Magazine, Chicks Dig Time Lords
- Notable awards: Hugo Award
- Website: www.lynnemthomas.com

Lynne M. Thomas is an American librarian, podcaster and editor. She has won eleven Hugo Awards for editing and podcasting in the science fiction genre. She is perhaps best known as the co-publisher and co-editor-in-chief of the Hugo Award-winning Uncanny Magazine until 2025, with her then-husband, Michael Damian Thomas. With her twelve Hugo Award wins (as of 2025), Thomas is the most awarded woman in the history of the awards, beating Connie Willis at eleven, and sixth all time for most wins amongst all Hugo Award winners.

== Biography ==
Thomas has degrees in French and comparative literature from Smith College, a master's in library science from the University of Illinois, and a master's in English and American literature from Northern Illinois University. She and her husband had one daughter, Caitlin, who had Aicardi syndrome. Michael was a full-time caregiver to Caitlin until she died in April 2024. The Thomases divorced in 2025, according to a joint social media post.

== Work ==
=== Library work ===
Thomas was the head of the rare books and special collections at Northern Illinois University (NIU) from 2004 until 2017. In her position as an archivist, she was in charge of the personal papers of over 75 science fiction authors such as Lois McMaster Bujold, Jack McDevitt, Fred Saberhagen, Eric Flint, Cherie Priest, Catherynne M. Valente, Patricia Wrede, Sharon Shinn, Ann Leckie, Elizabeth Bear, Tamora Pierce, Terri Windling, and Kage Baker, and the organizational archives of the Science Fiction and Fantasy Writers of America. In addition to curating literary papers, Thomas is also interested in archiving digital ephemera. She also highlighted the special collections at NIU by creating displays based on a theme, such as gender and identity.

In 2017, Thomas was named the Juanita J. and Robert E. Simpson Rare Book & Manuscript Professor of The Rare Book & Manuscript Library (University of Illinois at Urbana–Champaign).

=== Editing and fandom ===
Beginning in 2011, Thomas was the Editor-in-Chief of the Hugo Award-nominatedApex Magazine, a monthly science fiction, fantasy, and horror magazine, taking over as editor with issue 30 and concluding her term with issue 55 in 2013. It was during her time at Apex that Thomas edited Rachel Swirsky's award-winning story "If You Were a Dinosaur, My Love."

Thomas is very involved in Doctor Who fandom, though she remembers a time when the television show wasn't something most Americans knew about. She was a co-editor on Chicks Dig Time Lords, a Doctor Who anthology. The anthology has its roots among Thomas's friends who were visiting together in Chicago and who owned a publishing house, Mad Norwegian Press. It was Thomas's first anthology and was well received for "treating women's experiences with fandom seriously." Chicks Dig Time Lords won a Hugo Award, marking the first time in Hugo history that a nonfiction book about fictional media has won in any category. In January 2013, she became part of Verity!, an all-female hosted Doctor Who podcast.

Another book that was nominated for the Hugo Awards was Chicks Dig Comics (with Sigrid Ellis). Chicks Dig Comics is a feminist take on the world of fandom surrounding comic books. She won a second and third Hugo Award for her participation in the SF Squeecast podcast with Elizabeth Bear, Paul Cornell, Seanan McGuire, Catherynne M. Valente and David McHone-Chase, and was nominated for a Hugo Award for Best Fancast for a third and fourth times with Verity!.

In 2014, Lynne and Michael Thomas decided to go back to magazine editing. Thomas was the co-publisher and co-editor-in-chief of Uncanny Magazine until 2025. Uncanny Magazine won the Hugo Award for Best Semiprozine in 2016, 2017, 2018, 2019, 2020, and 2022, and its issue 2 story "Folding Beijing" by Hao Jingfang (translated by Ken Liu) was a 2016 winner of the Hugo Award for Best Novelette, and finalist for the Locus Award for Best Novelette and the Theodore Sturgeon Award. Uncanny Magazine story "You'll Surely Drown Here If You Stay" by Alyssa Wong was the winner of the 2017 Locus Award for Best Novelette and a finalist for the 2017 Hugo Award for Best Novelette and 2016 Nebula Award for Best Novelette. Uncanny Magazine story "Like a River Loves the Sky" by Emma Törzs was the winner of the 2019 World Fantasy Award—Short Fiction. Other Uncanny Magazine Hugo, Nebula, Locus, and World Fantasy Award finalist stories include stories by Brooke Bolander, Sam J. Miller, Amal El-Mohtar, Fran Wilde, Sarah Pinsker, Vina Jie-Min Prasad, K.M. Szpara, Ursula Vernon, and Aliette de Bodard.

As of August 2025, Thomas has won twelve Hugo Awards. She has been a finalist for the World Fantasy Award eight times, and nominated eleven times for the Locus Award. In Spring 2026 she and Katy Rawdon were the authors of The Infinite Loop: Archives and Time Travel in the Popular Imagination (ALA Neal-Schuman 2026).

== Bibliography ==
- with Beth Whittaker, Special Collections 2.0: New Technologies for Rare Books, Manuscripts, and Archival Collections (Libraries Unlimited, 2009). ISBN 978-1591587200
- with Tara O'Shea (editors), Chicks Dig Time Lords: A Celebration of Doctor Who by the Women Who Love It (Mad Norwegian Press, 2010). ISBN 978-1935234043
- with Deborah Stanish (editors), Whedonistas: A Celebration of the Worlds of Joss Whedon by the Women Who Love Them (Mad Norwegian Press, 2011). ISBN 978-1935234104
- with Sigrid Ellis (editors), Chicks Dig Comics: A Celebration of Comic Books by the Women Who Love Them (Mad Norwegian Press, 2012). ISBN 978-1935234050
- with John Klima and Michael Damian Thomas (editors), Glitter & Mayhem (Apex Publications, 2013). ISBN 978-1937009199
- Editor, The Book of Apex: Volume 4 (Apex Publications, 2013). ISBN 978-1937009205
- with Beth Whittaker (editors), New Directions for Special Collections: An Anthology of Practice (ABC-CLIO, 2016) ISBN 978-1440842900
- with Michael Damian Thomas (editors), The Best of Uncanny (Subterranean Press, 2019). ISBN 978-1596069183
- with Katy Rawdon (co-authors). The Infinite Loop: Archives and Time Travel in the Popular Imagination (ALA Neal-Schuman 2026) ISBN 979-8892552776

== Awards ==
- Winner 2011 Hugo Award for Best Related Work: Chicks Dig Time Lords (with Tara O'Shea, Mad Norwegian Press, 2010).
- Winner 2012 Hugo Award for Best Fancast: SF Squeecast (with Seanan McGuire, Paul Cornell, Elizabeth Bear, and Catherynne M. Valente).
- Winner 2013 Hugo Award for Best Fancast: SF Squeecast (with Seanan McGuire, Paul Cornell, Elizabeth Bear, Catherynne M. Valente, and David McHone-Chase).
- Winner 2013 Carl T. Hartmann Luck and Pluck Award, Horatio Alger Society
- Winner 2015 Society of American Archivists Preservation Publication Award: From Theory to Actions: Good Enough Digital Preservation for Under-Resourced Cultural Heritage Institutions.
- Winner 2016 Hugo Award for Best Semiprozine: Uncanny Magazine (with Michael Damian Thomas, Michi Trota, Erika Ensign, and Steven Schapansky).
- Winner 2016 Parsec Award for Best Speculative Fiction Fan or News Podcast (Specific): Verity Podcast. (with Deborah Stanish, Erika Ensign, Katrina Griffiths, L.M. Myles, and Tansy Rayner Roberts).
- Winner 2016 Parsec Award for Best Speculative Fiction Magazine or Anthology Podcast: The Uncanny Magazine Podcast (with Michael Damian Thomas, Erika Ensign, Amal El-Mohtar, C. S. E. Cooney, Deborah Stanish, and Steven Schapansky).
- Winner 2017 Hugo Award for Best Semiprozine: Uncanny Magazine (with Michael Damian Thomas, Michi Trota, Julia Rios, Erika Ensign, and Steven Schapansky).
- Winner, 2018 Hugo Award for Best Semiprozine: Uncanny Magazine (with Michael Damian Thomas, Michi Trota, Julia Rios, Erika Ensign, and Steven Schapansky).
- Winner 2018 Hugo Award for Best Editor Short Form: Lynne M. Thomas and Michael Damian Thomas
- Winner 2019 Hugo Award for Best Semiprozine: Uncanny Magazine (with Michael Damian Thomas, Michi Trota, Erika Ensign, Steven Schapansky, Elsa Sjunneson-Henry, and Dominik Parisien)
- Winner 2019 British Fantasy Award for Best Magazine / Periodical (with Michael Damian Thomas, Michi Trota, Erika Ensign, Steven Schapansky, Elsa Sjunneson-Henry, and Dominik Parisien)
- Winner 2020 Hugo Award for Best Semiprozine: Uncanny Magazine (with Michael Damian Thomas, Michi Trota, Chimedum Ohaegbu, Erika Ensign, Steven Schapansky)
- Winner 2022 Hugo Award for Best Semiprozine: Uncanny Magazine (with Michael Damian Thomas, Chimedum Ohaegbu, Elsa Sjunneson, Erika Ensign, Steven Schapansky)
- Winner 2023 Hugo Award for Best Semiprozine: Uncanny Magazine (with Michael Damian Thomas, Chimedum Ohaegbu, Monte Lin, Meg Elison, Erika Ensign and Steven Schapansky)
- Winner 2025 Hugo Award for Best Semiprozine: Uncanny Magazine (with Michael Damian Thomas, Monte Lin, Betsy Aoki, Erika Ensign, and Steven Schapansky)
