= Sonya Taaffe =

American author of short fiction and poetry

- Education: Brandeis University (BA, MA); Yale University (MA)
- Occupation: Author
- Writing career
- Notable awards: Rhysling Award (2003)

Sonya Taaffe is an American author of short fiction and poetry based out of Massachusetts. She grew up in Arlington and Lexington, Massachusetts and graduated from Brandeis University in 2003 where she received a B.A. and M.A. in Classical Studies. She also received an M.A. in Classical Studies from Yale University in 2008.

Taaffe was first published in 2001, with "Shade and Shadow" in Not One of Us, "Turn of the Century, Jack-in-the-Green" in Mythic Delirium, and "Constellations, Conjunctions" in Maelstrom Speculative Fiction.

Taaffe often writes for the small press magazine Not One of Us, for whose website she is the contributing editor. She served as a co-editor in the Poetry Department of Strange Horizons magazine alongside AJ Odasso and Romie Stott until 2016.

Taaffe proposed the name Vanth for the moon of dwarf planet Orcus to its discoverer, Michael E. Brown, which was approved by the International Astronomical Union (IAU).

== Influences ==
Among her influences, Taaffe highlights Angela Carter for impressing her with "language that voluptuous, overblown, and precise all at the same time." She also lists Harlan Ellison, Theodore Sturgeon, Ursula K. Le Guin, Tanith Lee, Patricia A. McKillip, Susan Cooper, Diana Wynne Jones, Jane Yolen, Caitlín R. Kiernan, Kathe Koja, Peter S. Beagle.

== Awards ==
Taaffe's poem "Matlacihuatl's Gift" won the Rhysling Award in 2003, and her poem "Follow Me Home" appeared in The Year's Best Fantasy and Horror 2008: 21st Annual Collection. Her short story "Retrospective" was shortlisted for the Speculative Literature Foundation's Fountain Award in 2004 and her poem "Muse" placed 2nd for the Dwarf Stars Award in 2008. Taaffe's collection Forget the Sleepless Shores was a finalist for the Lambda Literary Award in LGBT Speculative Fiction.

== Selected bibliography ==
=== Poetry ===
- "Matlacihuatl's Gift" (Dreams and Nightmares, Issue 63, 2002) (2003 Rhysling Award winner)
- "Philon from Ithaka, Theas's Son" (Paradox, Issue 2, Summer 2003)
- Postcards from the Province of Hyphens (2005, Prime Books)
- "Muse" (Strange Horizons, March 12, 2007; 2nd place in the 2008 Dwarf Stars Anthology)
- Postscripts from the Red Sea, published in a limited, handbound edition by Papaveria Press
- "Apotropaism" (Goblin Fruit, Winter 2009; featured in the 2010 Dwarf Stars Anthology)
- "Amal and the Night Visitors" (Goblin Fruit, Winter 2009)
- "Homeric Hymn to Demophoon" (Goblin Fruit, Fall 2009)
- "Anthology" (Cabinet des Fees, September 2009)
- "ὡς πολλοῖς ὄμμασιν εἰς σὲ βλέπω" (Strange Horizons, November 2009)
- "The Gambler"
- "Logos"
- "Titania's Dream"
- "Fasti"

=== Short fiction ===
- Singing Innocence and Experience (a collection, 2005, Prime Books)
- On the Blindside (2005)
- Forget the Sleepless Shores (a collection, finalist for the Lambda Literary Award, 2018, Lethe Press)
- "Moving Nameless” in King David and the Spiders from Mars (Dybbuk Press collection)
