= Cirsova Magazine =

American sci-fi, fantasy, and adventure magazine

Cirsova Magazine of Thrilling Adventure and Daring Suspense
- Cirsova Magazine of Thrilling Adventure and Daring Suspense: Issue #1 / Spring 2019
- Editor: P. Alexander
- Categories: Science fiction and fantasy
- Frequency: Quarterly
- Format: Print, ebook
- Publisher: Cirsova Publishing
- Founded: 2016
- First issue: 2 March 2016
- Country: United States
- Based in: United States
- Language: English
- Website: https://cirsova.wordpress.com/

Cirsova Magazine of Thrilling Adventure and Daring Suspense is an American pulp-style fantasy, science fiction, and adventure magazine founded in 2016. It is published by Cirsova Publishing and edited by P. Alexander. It was originally known as Cirsova Heroic Fantasy and Science Fiction Magazine.

== History ==
Cirsova was founded in 2016. The following year, the magazine was a finalist for the 2017 Hugo Award for Best Semiprozine. Cirsova publishes short, action-oriented fantasy and science fiction adventures "in the vein of classic pulp magazines." It has featured work by contemporary genre authors as well as longer, serialized works. Through December 2025, thirty-six issues had been published.

In Spring 2019, Cirsova published "Young Tarzan and the Mysterious She," a previously unpublished Tarzan story originally begun by Edgar Rice Burroughs and completed by Michael Tierney. The story was based on a Burroughs fragment that was once "thought destroyed in a fire,"; it appeared in Cirsova Magazine Volume 2, #1 (Spring 2019).

The Cosmic Courtship is a pulp science fiction romance by Julian Hawthorne (son of Nathaniel Hawthorne), which had originally appeared only in serialized form in 1917. In 2021, Cirsova Publishing released a collected edition of the stories comprising the novel.

== Reception ==
Issues of Cirsova have been reviewed by genre publications such as Tangent Online, which has described the magazine as including action-driven, pulp-influenced fantasy and science fiction. A review of the Spring 2023 issue in DMR Books described the magazine's “wonderfully weird” fiction, providing commentary on several stories.
