= Cheryl Morgan =

British publisher and critic

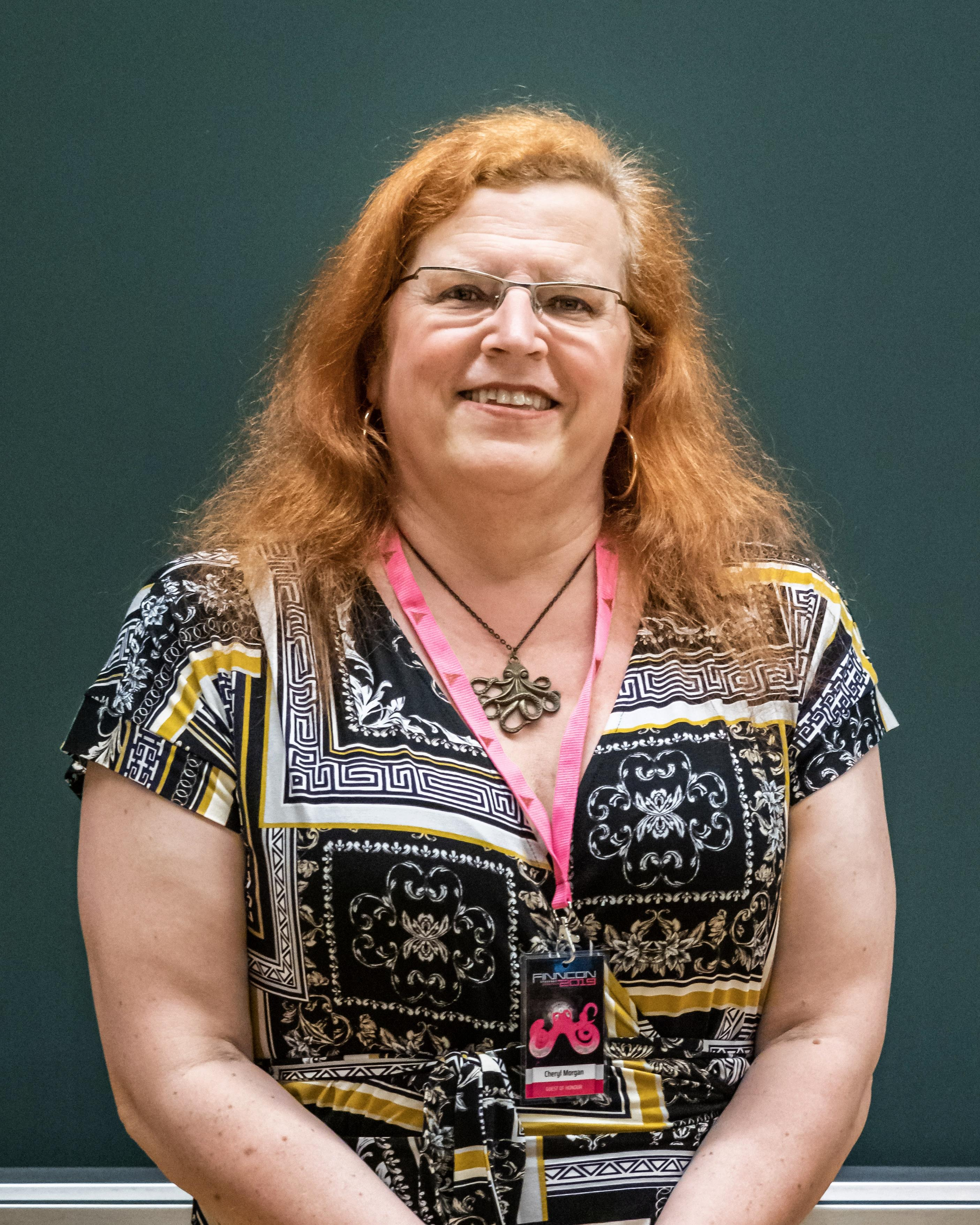
- Morgan at Finncon 2019
- Occupations: Critic; publisher
- Writing career
- Genre: Science fiction
- Website: cheryl-morgan.com

Cheryl Morgan is a British science fiction critic and publisher. She has won Hugo Awards for her work on the fanzine Emerald City from 1995 to 2006, and as non-fiction editor of Clarkesworld magazine from 2009 to 2011. Morgan was the first openly trans person to win a Hugo Award, and she is currently the editor of the science fiction magazine Salon Futura.

== Biography ==
Morgan edited the fanzine Emerald City from 1995 to 2006, and resided in Melbourne, San Francisco and the United Kingdom during this period. She was a part of the team running Science Fiction Awards Watch, and was non-fiction editor of Clarkesworld Magazine from 2009 to 2011. She is the owner of Wizard's Tower Press and the Wizard's Tower Books ebook store before it closed due to changes in EU regulation. She is currently the editor of Salon Futura, a science fiction magazine featuring a mix of articles and videos that launched in 2010.

Morgan was a Guest of Honor at the 2012 Eurocon, and served as judge for the James Tiptree Jr. Memorial Award in 2018. She was a keynote speaker at the 2018 Worldling SF conference, and is on the advisory board of Fafnir – Nordic Journal of Science Fiction and Fantasy Research. Morgan is also a director of San Francisco Science Fiction Conventions Inc., and was a founder of the Association for the Recognition of Excellence in SF & F Translation.

In addition to her genre work, Morgan co-presents Women's Outlook, a weekly community radio program in Bristol, UK focusing on women's issues, and is a director of The Diversity Trust, a UK-based community interest company. She is also co-chair of OutStories Bristol, an LGBT history organization, and has presented work on trans history in the form of lectures.

== Awards and honours ==
Morgan has been nominated for several Hugo Awards and has won four: Best Fanzine in 2004 for Emerald City, Best Fan Writer in 2009, and joint wins with the rest of the Clarkesworld team for Best Semiprozine in 2010 and 2011. She was the first openly trans person to win a Hugo.

Award	Category	Work	Year	Result
BSFA Award	Non-fiction	"A Sick Mind" (review)	2004	Nominated
Hugo Award	Semiprozine	Emerald City	2006	Nominated
Hugo Award	Semiprozine	Clarkesworld	2010	Won
Hugo Award	Semiprozine	Clarkesworld	2011	Won
Hugo Award	Fanzine	Emerald City	2003	Nominated
Hugo Award	Fanzine	Emerald City	2004	Won
Hugo Award	Fanzine	Emerald City	2005	Nominated
Hugo Award	Fan writer	Fan writing	2004	Nominated
Hugo Award	Fan writer	Fan writing	2005	Nominated
Hugo Award	Fan writer	Fan writing	2006	Nominated
Hugo Award	Fan writer	Fan writing	2008	Nominated
Hugo Award	Fan writer	Fan writing	2009	Won
Hugo Award	Web site	Emerald City	2005	Nominated
World Fantasy Award	Non-professional	Clarkesworld	2010	Nominated
World Fantasy Award	Non-professional	Clarkesworld	2012	Nominated
