= Speculations (magazine) =

- Categories: Literature
- Format: Print and digital
- Founded: 1994
- First issue: 1994
- Final issue: 2008
- Website: http://www.speculations.com/

Speculations was a resource for writers in the subgenres of science fiction, fantasy, and other speculative fiction subgenres. Founded in 1994 as a print magazine, Speculations moved online in 2000 and ceased operations in 2008. Speculations was a Hugo Award for Best Semiprozine nominee seven times. Kent Brewster was the publisher.

Editors included Kent Brewster, Susan Fry and Denise Lee.
