= Kent Brewster =

American novelist

Kent Brewster (born 1961) is a writer, editor, and publisher. He was the publisher and frequent editor of the Hugo Award-nominated Speculations, a magazine of science fiction and other speculative fiction, from its inception in 1994 until it ceased operating in 2008.

Brewster's short story, "“In the Pound, Near Breaktime," was a finalist for the 1996 Nebula Award for Best Short Story.

Brewster was born in the UK but lives and works in Silicon Valley, as an engineer for Pinterest. His web-based prototypes and demonstrations include Badge Any Feed with Pipes, Blog Juice and Netflix Widgets.
