= Susan Fry =

American author and editor

Susan Fry is an American author and editor.

During Fry's tenure as editor of Speculations, the magazine was twice nominated for the Hugo Award for Best Semiprozine, in 2001 and 2002.

Fry is a 1998 graduate of the Clarion West Writers Workshop.

== Selected fiction ==
- Short story "The Big Shot" in The Phobos Science Fiction Anthology Volume 3
- Short story "The Bird of Paradise" (with Daniel Abraham), Asimov's, June 2003.
