= Aegri Somnia =

Anthology of horror stories

- Editors: Jason Sizemore and Gill Ainsworth
- Cover artist: Michael Bielaczyc
- Language: English
- Genre: Horror
- Publisher: Apex Publications
- Publication date: 2006
- Publication place: United States
- Media type: Print (hardback & paperback)
- Pages: 196
- ISBN: 0-9788676-3-7
- OCLC: 416255574

Aegri Somnia is an anthology of horror stories edited by Jason Sizemore and Gill Ainsworth, and published by Apex Books in 2006. The twelve stories in this collection were all written by different authors. In 2006, Aegri Somnia was nominated for the Bram Stoker Award for Best Anthology.

The phrase aegri somnia is Latin, generally translated as "a sick man's dreams, hallucinations, or nightmares".

== Contents ==
The collection contains the following short stories:

- "YY" – Jennifer Pelland
- "The League of Last Girls" – Christopher Rowe
- "All Praise to the Dreamer" – Nancy Fulda
- "Nothing of Me" – Eugie Foster
- "Heal Thyself" – Scott Nicholson
- "On the Shoulders of Giants" – Bryn Sparks
- "Dream Takers" – Rhonda Eudaly
- "Letters from Weirdside" – Lavie Tidhar
- "Wishbones" – Cherie Priest
- "All Becomes as Wormwood" – Angeline Hawkes
- "Well of the Waters" – Mari Adkins
- "Mens Rea" – Steven Savile
