= Sweep of Stars =

Sci-fi novel by Maurice Broaddus

- Author: Maurice Broaddus
- Series: Astra Black Trilogy
- Genre: Science fiction, Afro-futurism
- Publisher: Tor Publishing Group
- Publication date: 2022
- Pages: 350
- ISBN: 9781250264930

Sweep of Stars 2022 is a science fiction novel by Maurice Broaddus and the first installation in the Astra Black trilogy. Sweep of Stars was a finalist for the Locus Award in 2023.

The novel explores the future of the human race in the year 2121 through the lens of Afro-Futurism to examine themes of oppression, healing, heritage, and identity.

== Plot ==
Sweep of Stars follows various families within the Muungano empire: a successful people who have ventured out from Earth (or O.E. "original Earth" as it is now called) to escape the war and turmoil that ravages their declining planet. The Muungano have cities across Mars, Titan, and the Starship Cypher where they are able to enjoy their bountiful and vibrant community.

Tension arises in this novel as oppressive forces from O.E. threaten to disrupt the Muungano's thriving empire. Unrest at the embassy and the suspected murder of a prominent Muungano leader prelude a shift within the community where new leaders must rise to the challenge of protecting their families' way of life.

Across the galaxy, through a wormhole, the HOVA brigade (human weapons utilized by the Muungano) are sent to explore an ancient planet for resources and signs of life, but are met with unexpected challenges that accompany reaching out into the unknown. The events of this novel are a catalyst for significant questions about culture and community that continue to be explored throughout the Astra Black trilogy.

== Characters ==
Sweep of Stars is narrated through a variety of POVs from a wide-ranging cast of characters.

The Ijo Seven Founding Families

- Camara Xola Adisa - Muungano leader
- Wachiru Adisa - Elder Son of Camara Xola
- Amachi Adisa - Adopted daughter of Camara Xola
- Ezeji Adisa
- Stacia Chikeke - Captain aboard Starship Cypher
- Yahya Chikeke - Husband to Stacia Chikeke
- Bekele Chikeke - Son of Yahya and Stacia
- Selamault Jywanza
- Nehanda Jywanza
- Maulana Buhari - Muungano leader
- Geoboe Nguni
- Khuma Nguni
- Itoro Nguni
- Jaha Dimka - A Muungano griot
- Lebna Dimka
- Bayard Yar'Adua

The HOVA Brigade

- Fela Buhari - Commander of the HOVA Brigade
- Epyc Ro Morgan - Captain
- Anita Gouvei - First Lieutenant
- Chantra Elle - Second Lieutenant
- Robin Townsend - Sergeant

Others

- Maya - Personal AI across Muungano technology

== Reception ==
Sweep of Stars received positive reviews from critics. It received starred reviews from Library Journal and Publishers Weekly. Publishers Weekly wrote that it was "a hugely ambitious and notable work of postcolonial science fiction." was a finalist for the 2023 Locus Award for Best Science Fiction Novel. In 2024, the novel was also short-listed for the Indiana Authors Award in science fiction.
