= Uncanny Magazine =

American sci-fi and fantasy online magazine

- Cover of issue 10, May 2016
- Editor: Michael Damian Thomas
- Former editors: Lynne M. Thomas
- Categories: science fiction and fantasy
- Frequency: Bimonthly
- Founder: Lynne M. Thomas and Michael Damian Thomas
- Founded: 2014
- First issue: November 4, 2014; 11 years ago
- Country: United States
- Language: English
- Website: uncannymagazine.com

Uncanny Magazine is an American science fiction and fantasy online magazine founded by publishing editors Lynne M. Thomas and Michael Damian Thomas.

== History ==
First issued in 2014, the publication is based in Urbana, Illinois. The editors-in-chief, who had previously edited Apex Magazine from 2012–2013, chose the name of the magazine because they say it "has a wonderful pulp feel" and like how the name evokes the unexpected. They created the magazine "in the spirit of pulp sci-fi mags popular in the 1960s and '70s." The editors have said that the purpose of the magazine is to push the boundaries of science fiction and fantasy by challenging readers while promoting an inclusive platform for writers of varied backgrounds. Invoking the whimsicality of its speculative subject matter, its mascot is a space unicorn.

Uncanny has published bimonthly, beginning in November 2014, after receiving initial funding through Kickstarter. It supports itself through crowdfunding as well as subscriptions, which numbered 4,000 in 2017.

The magazine became increasingly prominent after the editors won the Hugo Award for Best Semiprozine multiple times. Content such as an English translation of "Folding Beijing" by Hao Jingfang and "You'll Surely Drown Here If You Stay" by Alyssa Wong cement its reputation during the earlier issues by winning awards as well.

By March 2025, Thomas and Thomas had published 63 issues; at which point Lynne Thomas announced she would be stepping down as co-editor to direct her time for librarian activities as Head of Rare Books and Special Collections at the University of Illinois Urbana-Champaign.

== Publications ==
The magazine publishes original works by authors such as Neil Gaiman, Elizabeth Bear, Paul Cornell, Catherynne M. Valente, Charlie Jane Anders, Seanan McGuire, Mary Robinette Kowal, Javier Grillo-Marxuach, Alex Bledsoe, Nalo Hopkinson, Jane Yolen, Naomi Novik, N. K. Jemisin, G. Willow Wilson, Carmen Maria Machado, Amal El-Mohtar, Ursula Vernon, Kameron Hurley and Ken Liu, and published early stories by Alyssa Wong and Brooke Bolander. Each issue includes new short stories, one reprint, new poems, non-fiction essays, and a pair of interviews. The magazine pays its authors and artists. It also produces a podcast where some of the magazine's content is read aloud. They have a staff of 10 editors and receive between 1,000 and 2,000 submissions every month.

In 2018, they published a disability-themed issue called Disabled People Destroy Science Fiction with content exclusively from disabled creators. This was a continuation of the Destroy series originally from Lightspeed magazine; in it, the authors and illustrators envisioned "a truly accessible future is one that features rather than erases the disabled mind and body." The issue won an Aurora Award for Best Related Work in 2019.

== Staff ==
=== Current staff ===
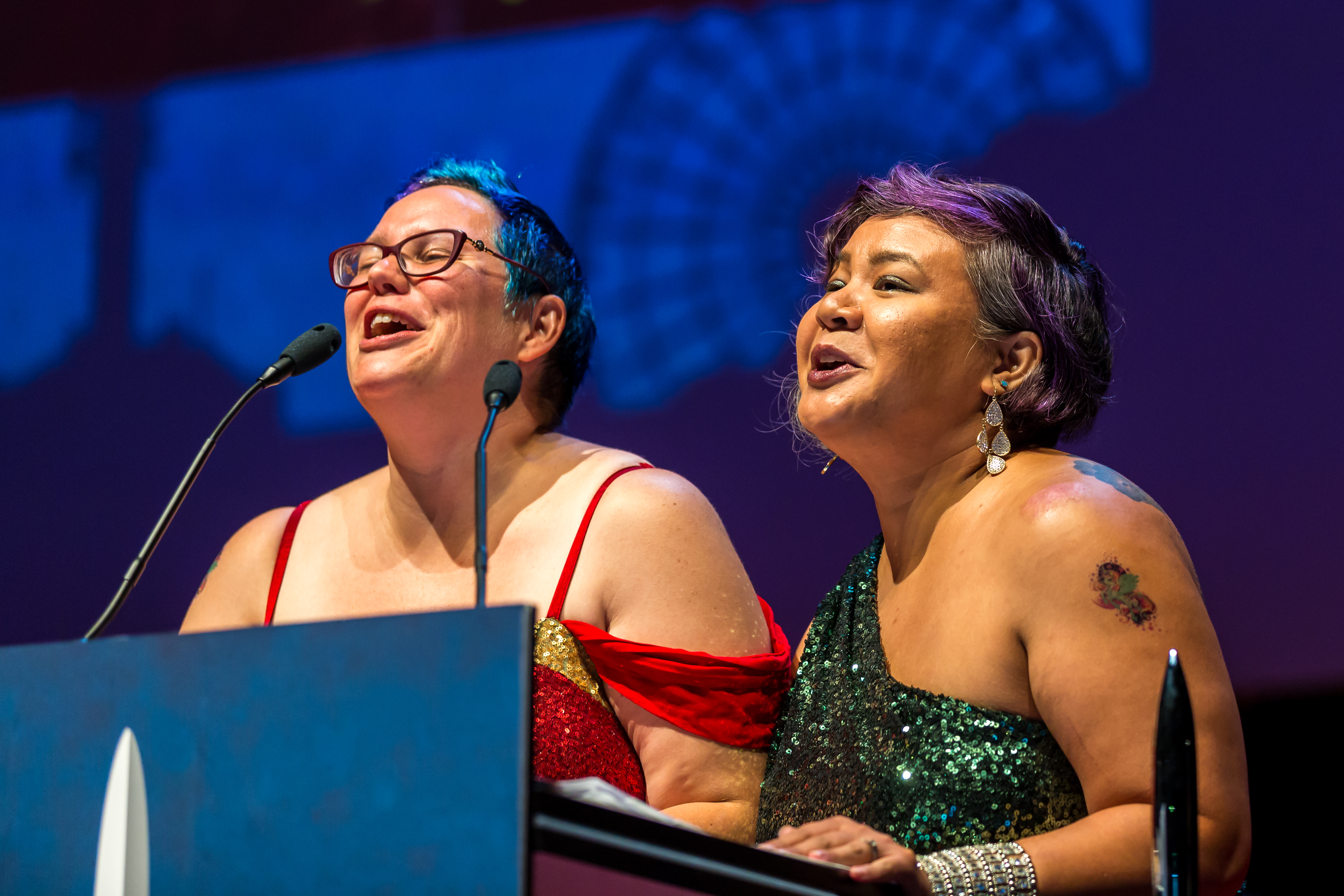
Julia Rios and Michi Trota accepting the Hugo Award for best semiprozine at Worldcon in Helsinki 2017

- Michael Damian Thomas – Publisher/Editor-in-Chief
- Monte Lin – Managing Editor
- Betsy Aoki – Poetry Editor
- Erika Ensign – Podcast Producer
- Steven Schapansky – Podcast Producer
- Matt Peters – Podcast Reader
- Caroline M. Yoachim – Interviewer

=== Former staff ===
- Lynne M. Thomas – Publisher/Editor-in-Chief
- Meg Elison - Nonfiction Editor
- Chimedum Ohaegbu – Managing Editor/Poetry Editor
- Naomi Day – Assistant Editor
- Elsa Sjunneson – Nonfiction Editor
- Joy Piedmont – Podcast Reader
- Angel Cruz – Assistant Editor
- Michi Trota – Managing/Nonfiction Editor
- Stephanie Malia Morris – Podcast Reader
- Mimi Mondal – Poetry/Reprint Editor
- Julia Rios – Poetry/Reprint Editor
- Amal El-Mohtar – Podcast Reader
- C. S. E. Cooney – Podcast Reader
- Deborah Stanish – Interviewer
- Shana DuBois – Interviewer

== Awards and recognition ==
In 2017, Uncanny won the 2016 Hugo Award for Best Semiprozine, and one of its published stories, "Folding Beijing" by Hao Jingfang translated by Ken Liu, won the Hugo Award for Best Novelette. It since went on to win the Hugo Award for Best Semiprozine every year from 2017 through 2020, 2022, and 2023.

=== Magazine awards ===
Award	Category	Year	Nominee	Result	Ref.
Hugo Award	Semiprozine	2016	Lynne M. Thomas, Michael Damian Thomas, Michi Trota, Erika Ensign, Steven Schapansky	Won	
Hugo Award	Semiprozine	2017	Lynne M. Thomas, Michael Damian Thomas, Michi Trota, Julia Rios, Erika Ensign, and Steven Schapansky	Won	
Hugo Award	Semiprozine	2018	Lynne M. Thomas, Michael Damian Thomas, Michi Trota, Julia Rios, Erika Ensign, and Steven Schapansky	Won	
Hugo Award	Semiprozine	2019	Lynne M. Thomas, Michael Damian Thomas, Michi Trota, Erika Ensign, Steven Schapansky, Elsa Sjunneson-Henry, and Dominik Parisien	Won	
Hugo Award	Semiprozine	2020	Lynne M. Thomas, Michael Damian Thomas, Michi Trota, Chimedum Ohaegbu, Erika Ensign, Steven Schapansky	Won	
Hugo Award	Semiprozine	2021	Lynne M. Thomas, Michael Damian Thomas, Michi Trota, Chimedum Ohaegbu, Elsa Sjunneson, Erika Ensign, Steven Schapansky	Nominated	
Hugo Award	Semiprozine	2022	Lynne M. Thomas, Michael Damian Thomas, Chimedum Ohaegbu, Elsa Sjunneson, Erika Ensign, Steven Schapansky	Won	
Hugo Award	Semiprozine	2023	Lynne M. Thomas, Michael Damian Thomas, Chimedum Ohaegbu, Monte Lin, Meg Elison, Erika Ensign, Steven Schapansky	Won	
Hugo Award	Semiprozine	2024	Lynne M. Thomas, Michael Damian Thomas, Monte Lin, Meg Elison, Erika Ensign, Steven Schapansky	Nominated	
Hugo Award	Semiprozine	2025	Lynne M. Thomas, Michael Damian Thomas, Monte Lin, Meg Elison, Erika Ensign, Steven Schapansky	Won	
Hugo Award	Semiprozine	2026	Michael Damian Thomas, Monte Lin, Betsy Aoki, Erika Ensign, Steven Schapansky	Won	
Hugo Award	Professional Editor, Short Form	2017	Lynne M. Thomas and Michael Damian Thomas	Nominated	
Hugo Award	Professional Editor, Short Form	2018	Lynne M. Thomas and Michael Damian Thomas	Won	
Hugo Award	Professional Editor, Short Form	2019	Lynne M. Thomas and Michael Damian Thomas	Nominated	
Hugo Award	Professional Editor, Short Form	2020	Lynne M. Thomas and Michael Damian Thomas	Nominated	
Hugo Award	Professional Editor, Short Form	2024	Lynne M. Thomas and Michael Damian Thomas	Nominated	
Hugo Award	Professional Editor, Short Form	2025	Lynne M. Thomas and Michael Damian Thomas	Nominated	
Hugo Award	Professional Editor, Short Form	2026	Michael Damian Thomas	Nominated	
British Fantasy Award	Magazine/Periodical	2017	Uncanny	Nominated	
British Fantasy Award	Magazine/Periodical	2019	Uncanny (Lynne M. Thomas, Michael Damian Thomas, Michi Trota, Erika Ensign, Steven Schapansky, Elsa Sjunneson and Dominik Parisien)	Won	
Aurora Awards	Related Work	2019	Disabled People Destroy Science Fiction (Elsa Sjunneson and Dominik Parisien)	Won	
Parsec Awards	Speculative Fiction Magazine or Anthology Podcast	2016	The Uncanny Magazine Podcast (Lynne M. Thomas, Michael Damian Thomas, Erika Ensign, Amal El-Mohtar, C. S. E. Cooney, Deborah Stanish, and Steven Schapansky)	Won	

=== Art awards ===
- 2016 Gold Spectrum Award – Editorial Category – "Traveling to a Distant" Day by Tran Nguyen (Uncanny Magazine #4 Cover)
- 2016 Chesley Awards – Best Cover Illustration: Magazine – "Traveling to a Distant Day" by Tran Nguyen (Uncanny Magazine #4 Cover)
- 2017 Chesley Awards – Best Cover Illustration: Magazine – "Bubbles and Blast Off" by Galen Dara (Uncanny Magazine #10)

=== Content awards ===
- 2015 William Atheling Jr. Award for Criticism or Review – "Does Sex Make Science Fiction 'Soft'?" by Tansy Rayner Roberts (Uncanny Magazine #1)
- 2016 Hugo Award for Best Novelette – "Folding Beijing" by Hao Jingfang, translated by Ken Liu (Uncanny Magazine #2)
- 2017 Locus Award for Best Novelette – "You'll Surely Drown Here If You Stay" by Alyssa Wong (Uncanny Magazine #10)
- 2017 Rhysling Award–Best Long Poem – "Rose Child" by Theodora Goss (Uncanny Magazine #13)
- 2018 Eugie Award – "Clearly Lettered in a Mostly Steady Hand" by Fran Wilde (Uncanny Magazine #18)
- 2019 World Fantasy Award—Short Fiction – "Like a River Loves the Sky" by Emma Törzs (Uncanny Magazine #21)
- 2020 Ignyte Awards–Best in Creative Nonfiction – "Black Horror Rising" by Tananarive Due (Uncanny Magazine #28)
- 2021 Hugo Awards for Best Short Story – "Metal Like Blood in the Dark" by Ursula Vernon, as T. Kingfisher (Uncanny Magazine #36)
- 2022 Locus Award for Best Novelette – "That Story Isn't the Story" by John Wiswell (Uncanny Magazine #43)
- 2022 Nebula Award for Best Short Story – "Where Oaken Hearts Do Gather" by Sarah Pinsker (Uncanny Magazine #39)
- 2022 Locus Award for Best Short Story – "Where Oaken Hearts Do Gather" by Sarah Pinsker (Uncanny Magazine #39)
- 2022 Eugie Award – "Where Oaken Hearts Do Gather" by Sarah Pinsker (Uncanny Magazine #39)
- 2022 Hugo Award for Best Short Story – "Where Oaken Hearts Do Gather" by Sarah Pinsker (Uncanny Magazine #39)
- 2023 Hugo Award for Best Short Story - "Rabbit Test" by Samantha Mills (Uncanny Magazine #49) (Note: Mills subsequently disavowed the award due to the controversy regarding the ballot.)
- 2025 Hugo Award for Best Short Story "Stitched to Skin Like Family Is" by Nghi Vo (Uncanny Magazine #57)
