= Kheprw Institute =

Nonprofit organization

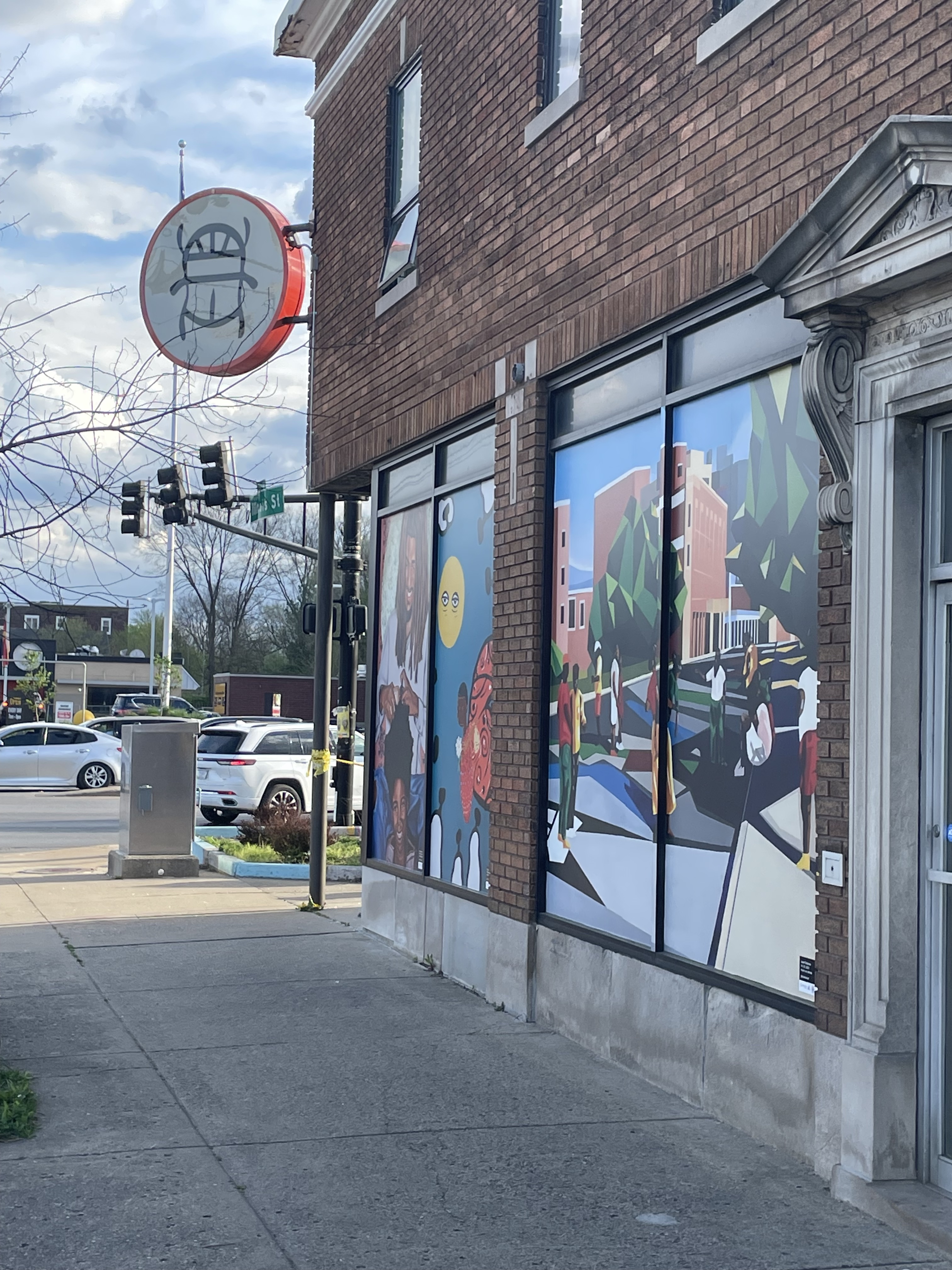
- Type: 501(c)(3) Public Charity
- Tax ID no.: 20-0820589
- Location(s): 3802 N. Illinois Street; Indianapolis, Indiana 46208
- Region served: Indianapolis, Indiana
- Key people: Executive Director, Imhotep Adisa; Director of Operations, Paulette Fair
- Website: Kheprw Institute

The Kheprw Institute is a nonprofit organization located in Indianapolis, Indiana. It focuses on community organizing and leadership development and serves hundreds of people through its programs. Kheprw Institute is a member of the Climate Justice Alliance.

== History ==
Kheprw Institute (KI) was founded in 2003 and established as a nonprofit in 2004. The founders Paulette Fair, Pambana Uishi, and Imhotep Adisa report that the organization was named after the Kemetic word for the scarab beetle, a symbol of renewal. KI began as youth outreach and leadership development program to mentor African American males enrolled in Indianapolis schools. KI's philosophy and approach to community development is framed around the Empowerment, Economy, Education, and Environment (the "Four E's").

== Impact ==
Kheprw serves hundreds of people in Indianapolis through community programs. Some of these programs have included the Good Stuff Thrift Store (2004–2009), KI Paint (2006–2010), a fair-trade coffee café that provides free Internet access (2006–2012), and a variety of other social enterprises. Kheprw also manages a charitable trust that serves as a community investment fund. In 2016 the Institute launched a Community Controlled Food Initiative to connect community members to produce grown by local farmers. The Initiative also supported a monthly Good Food Feast, a neighborhood potluck and cooking demonstration. In February 2020, the Institute launched Alkhemy, an entrepreneur hub for under-resourced communities. Like many community organizations, Kheprw moved many of its community meetings online during the pandemic. Other programs were postponed.

In 2022 the city of Indianapolis chose to invest $1.5 million in a KI program to promote home ownership and to counteract gentrification. That same year, the organization coordinated a community gardening program, Growin' Good in the Hood, to alleviate food shortages.

At the end of 2022, the Institute received a $90,000 grant to support Octavia's Visionary Campus, a seventeen-acre urban farm on the south side of Indianapolis.

In early 2023, Kheprw released a report with the Polis Center at Indiana University-Purdue University Indianapolis focused on disparities in Marion County's criminal justice system.
