= Woolamaloo Gazette =

Blog

The Woolamaloo Gazette is a blog begun by Edinburgh bookseller Joe Gordon in April 2003, posting satirical takes on news stories, comments, book reviews, photographs and general life in Edinburgh. In January 2005 Gordon was fired by his long-term employer Waterstone's after 12 years of service for negative comments about working life at his branch in his blog. The case was picked up rapidly by online sites and spread by fellow bloggers and book reviewers before coming to the attention of the national media in the Guardian and Scotsman, then radio and finally international media, bringing a small blog to much wider attention and promoting those negative comments, which made up a small proportion of the overall posts, to worldwide attention. A number of authors Gordon had worked with over the years also publicly attacked Waterstone's for this behaviour. Many were upset that a bookstore which had run campaigns celebrating the freedom of speech would try to gag their own staff in such a heavy-handed manner, especially a long-serving employee who had also represented the company favourably discussing literature on a number of media programmes over the years.

The case was also of interest to those in personnel and employment law because it was one of the first high-profile examples of someone in the UK being fired for blogging comments. On a later appeal Gordon, with representation from his union, the RBA, was successful and it was admitted that the dismissal was wrong, although the company still disapproved of the blogging comments but acknowledged it should have been dealt with in a less severe manner. However, by this point Gordon had been approached by comics and SF bookstore Forbidden Planet International; an amicable agreement was reached with Waterstone's. Gordon works for Forbidden Planet International's website and, ironically, set up and maintains their popular blog as part of his duties; he is still fielding questions from individuals, law students and the media on the subject.

== Bibliography ==
- Oliver Jackson, Great News!
