= Emerald City (magazine) =

Science fiction fanzine

- Color cover of issue #100, December 2003
- Editor: Cheryl Morgan
- Categories: Science-fiction fanzine
- Frequency: Monthly
- First issue: September 1995
- Final issue Number: October/November 2006; 134
- Country: United States
- Language: English
- Website: emcit.com
- OCLC: 426948125

Emerald City was a science-fiction fanzine published in print and on the internet by Cheryl Morgan. She had assistance from Kevin Standlee and Anne Murphy. The magazine published 134 regular issues and 6 special issues between September 1995 and October/November 2006. Emerald City received several Hugo Award nominations during its run, winning once in 2004 in the Best Fanzine category.

== History ==
Morgan began publishing Emerald City in September 1995, and the magazine contained numerous reviews of books and reports on the current state of science fiction fandom. The vast majority of the published material was written by Morgan herself, though several guest writers also contributed. The last issue, #134, was published in November 2006. The magazine was published on a regular monthly schedule, and Morgan had produced a total of 134 issues, all of which are still available as of November 2011 for download in multiple formats. Morgan also maintained a popular weblog with current news related to science fiction and fantasy writing and publishing.

== Awards and honors ==
In 2004, Emerald City won the Hugo Award for Best Fanzine. In 2005, Cheryl Morgan was nominated for three Hugo Awards: the magazine for Best Fanzine, Morgan herself for Best Fan Writer, and the web site for Best Web Site. Subsequently, Morgan declared Emerald City to be a semiprozine, and the magazine was nominated in 2006 for Best Semiprozine, while Morgan was again nominated for Best Fan Writer.

In 2008, after continuing to write at her personal website, cheryl-morgan.com, Morgan was nominated for another Hugo Award for best fan writing. She was again nominated and won 2009's Hugo Award in this category. In 2010 and 2011, Clarkesworld Magazine, a semiprozine on which Morgan worked as non-fiction editor, was nominated and won for Best Semiprozine. In 2011, Morgan withdrew from the Clarkesworld staff as well as from several other genre projects.

As of 2011, Emerald City and Morgan as an individual have been nominated for a total of 10 Hugo Awards, with two wins. The two Clarkesworld wins brought her personal Hugo Award collection up to four rockets.
