= Not One of Us =

Speculative fiction magazine

First issue cover

Not One Of Us is a small press horror and science fiction magazine published in Massachusetts, USA, four times a year. The first issue appeared in October 1986. The theme is "people or things out of place in their surroundings": outsiders, social misfits, aliens in the science-fictional sense—anyone excluded from society for whatever the reason. The magazine publishes stories and poems that explore otherness (differing perspectives, outsiders, non-confirmity) from every possible angle.

Not One of Us has published work by authors who have gone on to make names for themselves in the science fiction and horror small press, including Jennifer Rachel Baumer, H. E. Fassl, Patricia Russo, Sonya Taaffe and Jeffrey Thomas.

Not One of Us has been called a “reliable source for interesting dark prose and poetry” by Ellen Datlow (editor of Year's Best Fantasy and Horror) and “character-oriented dark fantasy […] disquieting reflection” by Rich Horton (editor of Year's Best Science Fiction and Fantasy).

== Staff ==
- John Benson, editor
- Sonya Taaffe, contributing editor
