= Julia Rios =

American writer, editor, podcaster, and narrator

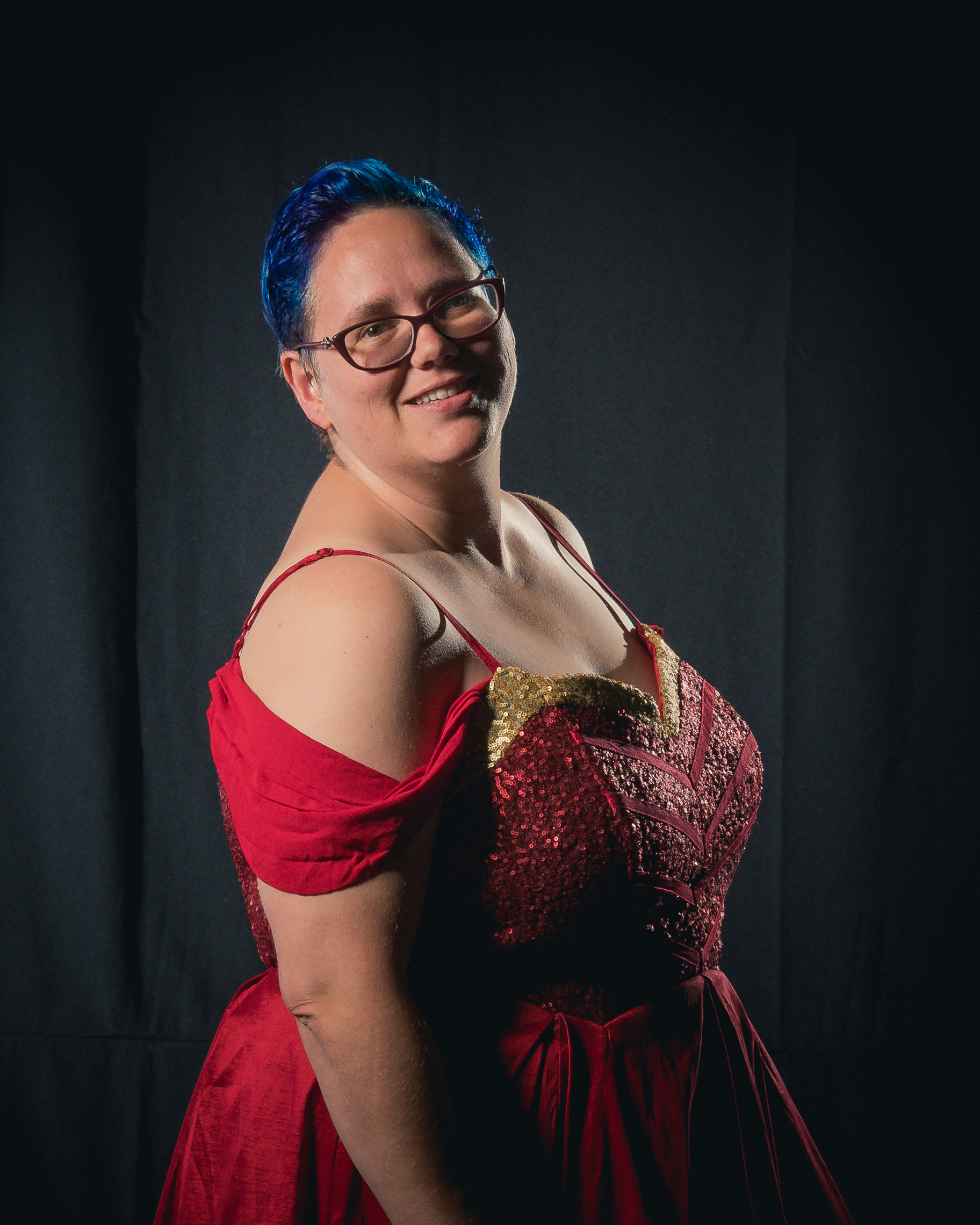
- Portrait photoshoot at Worldcon 75, Helsinki, before the Hugo Awards
- Website: www.juliarios.com

Julia Rios is an American writer, editor, podcaster, and narrator.

== Biography ==
Born in the United States, Rios is partly of Mexican descent. They have won a number of awards for their work in Science Fiction and Fantasy and has even more nominations. They have hosted a number of podcasts including Outer Alliance and The Skiffy and Fanty Show. Rios has also been an editor for several of the genres biggest name magazines such as Strange Horizons, Uncanny Magazine and Fireside Magazine. They have also worked as a narrator for PodCastle and Pseudopod. Rios is a co-founders of Fuente Collective. In 2019 the Science Fiction and Fantasy Writers of America awarded them the Kevin O'Donnell Jr. award for establishing of the SFWA mentoring initiative. Rios has a strong interest in diversity, especially in queer and Latinx communities.

== Awards ==
- 2019 SFWA Kevin O’Donnell, Jr. Service Award
- Hugo Awards
  - 2017 Uncanny Magazine
  - 2018 Uncanny Magazine
- Aurealis Awards
  - 2017: Year's Best YA Speculative Fiction 2015 (JR & Alisa Krasnostein, eds.) (Twelfth Planet)
  - 2015: Kaleidoscope: Diverse YA Science Fiction and Fantasy Stories (Alisa Krasnostein & JR, eds.) (Twelfth Planet Press)
- Ditmar Awards
  - 2015: Kaleidoscope (Alisa Krasnostein & JR, eds.) (Twelfth Planet)
- Shirley Jackson Award
  - 2024: Why Didn’t You Just Leave (JR & Nadia Bulkin, eds), Best Edited Anthology

== Bibliography ==
- Fireside Magazine
- Fireside Quarterly
- Year's Best Young Adult Speculative Fiction
- Year's Best YA Speculative Fiction 2013 (2014) with Alisa Krasnostein
- Year's Best YA Speculative Fiction 2014 (2016) with Alisa Krasnostein
- Year's Best Young Adult Speculative Fiction 2015 (2016) with Alisa Krasnostein
- In Other Words (2014) with Saira Ali
- Kaleidoscope: Diverse YA Science Fiction and Fantasy Stories (2014) with Alisa Krasnostein
