= Elsa Sjunneson =

American writer and editor

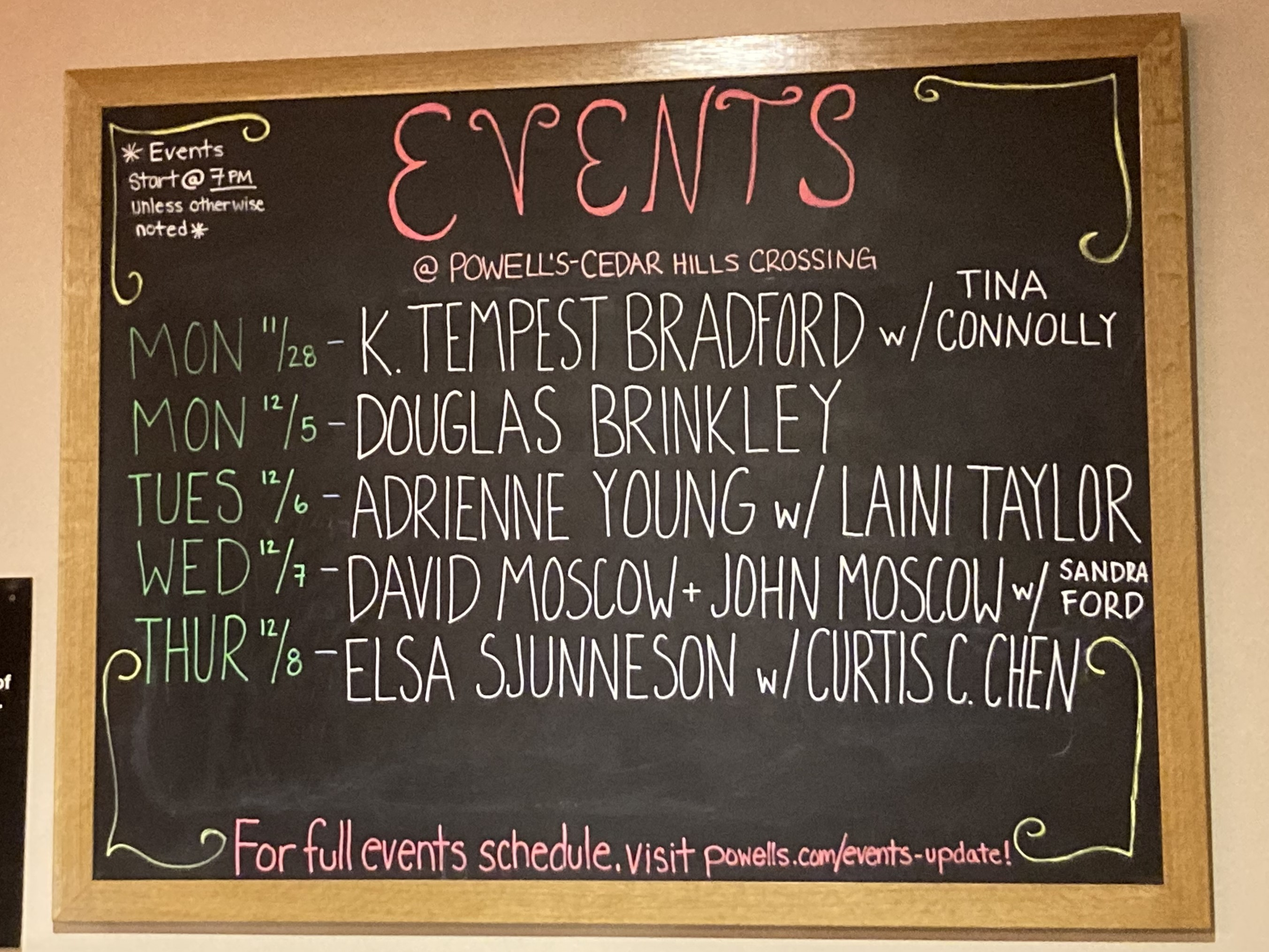
- On chalkboard at Powell's Books
- Born: 1985 (age 40–41)
- Education: Gonzaga University; Sarah Lawrence College
- Occupations: Author; editor; disability rights activist
- Writing career
- Genres: Speculative fiction; nonfiction
- Website: snarkbat.com

Elsa Sjunneson (born 1985) is an American speculative fiction writer, editor, media critic, and disability rights activist. She is a Hugo Award and Aurora Award winner through her editorial work on Uncanny Magazine. Deafblind since birth, Sjunneson writes and speaks extensively about the representations of disability in the media.

== Biography ==
Elsa Sjunneson was born in 1985. She was born with congenital rubella syndrome, resulting in hearing loss, cataracts in both eyes, and a heart defect. She is legally blind and wears an artificial eye and bilateral hearing aids.

She attended Gonzaga University, earning a bachelor's degree in history in 2008. While at Gonzaga she worked to raise awareness for FACE AIDS. Sjunneson earnED a master's degree in women's history from Sarah Lawrence College in 2011.

Sjunneson was an adjunct professor at the New Jersey Institute of Technology Department of Humanities in 2019, where she taught writing. She lives in Seattle, Washington.

== Writing and media criticism ==
Sjunneson writes in multiple genres, including speculative fiction and nonfiction.

She is a game designer and writes about inclusive game design. Sjunneson was the lead developer and creative director of the Fate Accessibility Toolkit. In a 2019 article in Dragon+ magazine, she discusses inclusionary practices for accommodating disabled players in tabletop role-playing games.

Sjunneson frequently writes about the representation of disability in popular culture. "Constructing Blindness," a series of essays for Tor.com, discusses blindness as it is represented in movies and television shows. She has written essays about her own disabilities for CNN and The Boston Globe.

Sjunneson's memoir Being Seen: One Deafblind Woman's Fight to End Ableism, published in October 2021, explores cultural perceptions of disability along with her own experience. She published Dear Blind Lady: Disability Advice You Didn't Know You Needed in 2026.

== Awards ==
Sjunneson has been a Hugo Award finalist seven times for her writing and editorial work. She won the Hugo Award for Best Fan Writer in 2021. She was a guest of honor at CONvergence in 2021. Sjunneson was a nominee for the 2019 Nebula Award for Best Game Writing for the Fate Accessibility Toolkit. Sjunneson was also nominated for the 2022 Hugo Award for Best Related Work for Being Seen: One Deafblind Woman's Fight to End Ableism.

As the nonfiction editor of Disabled People Destroy Science Fiction, issue 24 of Uncanny Magazine, Sjunneson shared in the 2019 Hugo Award for Best Semiprozine and the 2019 Aurora Award for Best Related Work. As an editorial staff member of Uncanny Magazine, she was a winner of the 2019 British Fantasy Award for Best Magazine / Periodical. She was the first blind person to win a Hugo Award (although Edmund Meskys, editor of Hugo-winning Niekas, became blind after his Hugo win).
