= AJ Odasso =

American author and poet

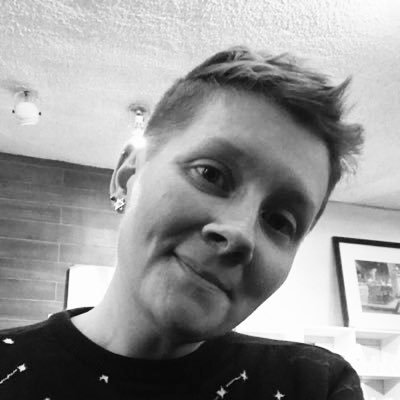
- Odasso in 2019
- Born: 20 December 1981 (age 44); United States
- Education: Boston University
- Occupations: Writer; Poet
- Writing career
- Period: 2005 - Present
- Genres: Historical fiction, Science fiction, and Speculative poetry
- Website: ajodasso.articulation.website

AJ Odasso is an American queer, intersex, nonbinary author and poet with a published career dating back to 2005. They are also a fourteen-time nominee and one-time winner of the Hugo Award in the Semi-Prozine category in their capacity as Senior Poetry Editor for the speculative fiction magazine, Strange Horizons. An English Faculty member at San Juan College, Odasso holds a Master of Fine Arts degree in creative writing from Boston University.

== Writing career ==
Odasso began their published career in 2005 while an undergraduate at Wellesley College, since then producing poetry, nonfiction, and short stories for magazines and anthologies. Their poetry has been published in Sybil's Garage, Mythic Delirium, Midnight Echo, Not One of Us, Dreams & Nightmares, Strange Horizons, Liminality, Stone Telling, Farrago's Wainscot, Battersea Review, Barking Sycamores, Goblin Fruit, New England Review of Books, and other publications. Solo collections include: Lost Books (Flipped Eye Publishing), published 2010, The Dishonesty of Dreams (Flipped Eye Publishing), published 2014, and The Sting of It (Tolsun Books), published 2019, originally shortlisted for the 2017 Sexton Prize as Things Being What They Are. They have also published a historical fiction novel, The Pursued and the Pursuing (DartFrog Blue), a continuation of The Great Gatsby.

Odasso is also Senior Poetry Editor and Media Reviews Editor for Strange Horizons, a weekly speculative fiction and non-fiction magazine, where they have worked since 2012.

== Personal life ==
Currently living in New Mexico, Odasso holds a Master of Fine Arts degree in creative writing from Boston University. They are a full-time English Faculty member at San Juan College. They are intersex, identifying as pansexual and non-binary. They are also Jewish and on the autism spectrum.

== Bibliography ==
- Odasso, Adrienne (2010). Lost Books
- Odasso, AJ (2014). The Dishonesty of Dreams
- Odasso, AJ (2019). The Sting of It
- Odasso, AJ (2021). The Pursued and the Pursuing

== Awards and recognition ==
=== Solo works ===
- Lost Books: 2010 London New Poetry Award nominee; 2010/2011 The People's Book Prize winner, Fiction Category, Winter 2010
- Things Being What They Are: 2017 Sexton Prize shortlist
- The Sting of It: 2019 New Mexico/Arizona Book Award winner, Gay/Lesbian (GLBT) category
- The Pursued and the Pursuing: 2021 Reads Rainbow Award, 2nd Place, Historical Fiction category

=== Strange Horizons Senior Poetry Editor ===
- Hugo Award Finalist, Semi-Prozine category, 2013, 2014, 2015, 2016, 2017, 2018, 2019, 2020, 2021, 2022, 2023, 2024, 2025, 2026
- Hugo Award Winner, Semi-Prozine category, 2024
