= Niall Harrison =

British medical writer and science fiction editor, critic and publisher

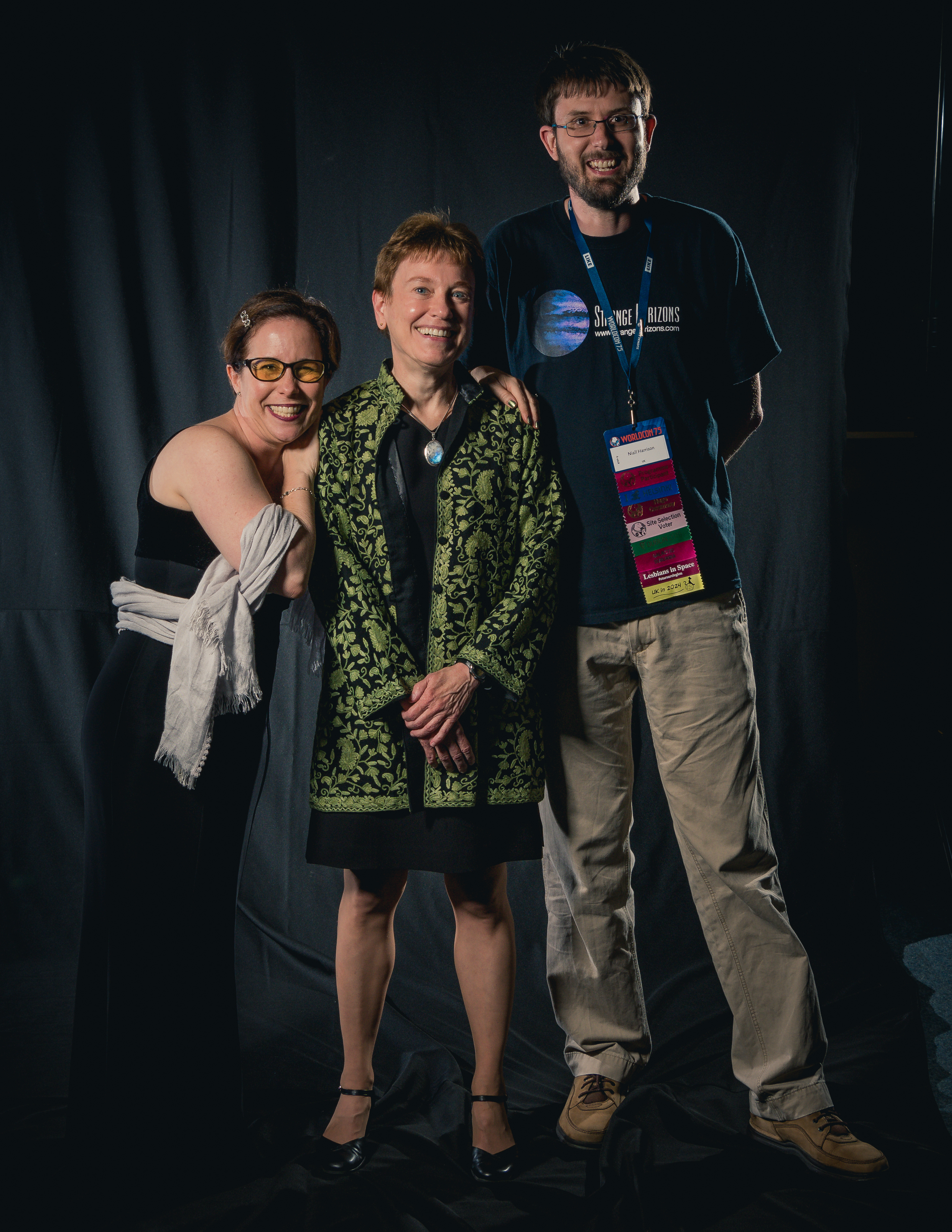
- Fran Wilde, Carolyn Ives Gilman and Niall Harrison respectively.
- Born: 1980 (age 45–46); England, United Kingdom
- Occupations: Writer, editor
- Writing career
- Genre: Science fiction
- Website: urchin.earth.li/~sax

Niall Sidney Harrison is a British medical writer and science fiction editor, critic and publisher. He was a judge of the Arthur C. Clarke Award in 2006 and 2007 and Guest of Honour at Eastercon 2023.

== Biography ==
Harrison read biochemistry at Magdalen College, Oxford, from 1998 to 2002. He currently lives in Newcastle and works as a medical writer. He is co-chair of the ACCORD Steering Committee, which is developing a guideline to improve the reporting of biomedical studies that use consensus methodologies.

== Science fiction ==
Between 2006 and 2010, Harrison was editor of Vector – the magazine of the British Science Fiction Association – as well as writing Torque Control, Vector's editorial blog. Between 2007 and 2010, he was senior reviews editor for Strange Horizons; in 2010 he became editor-in-chief, a position he served in until stepping down in 2017. As a critic, his work has appeared in Interzone, Foundation and The New York Review of Science Fiction as well as Vector and Strange Horizons. He is the publisher of Briardene Books where he also blogs.

== Publications ==
- British Science Fiction And Fantasy: Twenty Years, Two Surveys (with Paul Kincaid) (BSFA Publishing, 2010)
- All These Worlds: Reviews and Essays (Briardene Books, 2023)
