= Apex Magazine =

Speculative fiction magazine

- Editor: Lesley Conner
- Categories: Science fiction magazine
- Frequency: Quarterly
- Publisher: Apex Book Company
- First issue: March 16, 2005
- Country: United States
- Based in: Lexington, Kentucky
- Website: apex-magazine.com
- ISSN: 2157-1406
- OCLC: 662533976

Apex Magazine, previously known as Apex Science Fiction & Horror Digest, is an American horror and science fiction magazine. The magazine is released quarterly and contains short fiction, reviews, and interviews, with stories originally published in Apex having won multiple Nebula and Hugo Awards. Apex Magazine is published by Apex Book Company, an independent small press that focuses on fantasy and horror books with a literary bent.

== History ==
The first issue of Apex Magazine was released in spring 2005 under the title Apex Science Fiction & Horror Digest. From the start, the magazine focused on publishing dark science fiction, fantasy, and horror.

The magazine was originally edited by Jason Sizemore, who remained as publisher and co-editor for much of the magazine's history. Initially published quarterly as a print magazine and distributed by Ingram Content Group, in 2009 the magazine moved to online and electronic publication with a monthly schedule after Sizemore grew disillusioned with the traditional magazine distribution system.

In addition to Sizemore, award-winning author Catherynne M. Valente edited the magazine for issues #15–29, Hugo Award-winning editor Lynne M. Thomas for issues #30–55, and Sigrid Ellis for issues #56–67.

In 2023, Sizemore stepped back from editing the magazine to focus on the larger Apex publishing business, with Lesley Conner taking over as editor-in-chief and Rebecca Treasure serving as managing editor.

The magazine took an 8-month hiatus starting in 2019, returning on January 5, 2020, with issue 121 while also transitioning to a bimonthly publication schedule. Upon the return from its hiatus, Apex resumed digital-only publication. In 2025, the magazine moved to a quarterly publication schedule.

The magazine promotes a Story of the Year that is voted on by readers and fans of the magazine. It also published poems until 2017.

In 2025, the magazine had 5,288 unique visitors per month and 1,100 paid subscribers. In July 2025, the magazine published its 150th issue.

== Critical reception ==
Former Apex editor-in-chief Catherynne M. Valente described the stories published by the magazine as "Strange. Surreal. Shocking. Beautiful." Since Valente left as editor, the magazine has continued to define itself by those qualities. Stephen Hunt's SFCrowsnest described the magazine as "looking into a dark room where insanity resides and you seem to have the feeling that by remaining too long in the realms of this strange world the chances of escape may elude you."

In 2013, Book Riot named Apex Magazine as one of "three essential short-story magazines" in the fantasy, science fiction and horror genres, adding that the magazine's stories "infuse magic" into our own reality and are "always thoroughly enjoyable." Three years later, The Oxford Culture Review praised Apex as "one of the most influential and acclaimed" new publications in the science fiction, fantasy, and horror genres.

Jeremy Brett, curator of the Science Fiction & Fantasy Research Collection at Texas A&M University, has called the fiction published in Apex Magazine "excellently written and enjoyable."

== Contributing writers ==
Authors published by Apex Magazine have included Rebecca Roanhorse (with the magazine publishing her very first short story), Alix E. Harrow , Neil Gaiman, Poppy Z Brite, Cherie Priest, Eugie Foster, Maurice Broaddus, Ben Bova, William F. Nolan, Sara King, Brian Keene and many others. Featured authors have included Steven Savile, Sara King, David Conyers and Lavie Tidhar.

== Apex Book Company ==
In 2006 Apex Digest announced a move to book publishing, beginning with the anthology Aegri Somnia (2006), edited by Jason Sizemore and Gill Ainsworth. This book contains original work by the first twelve featured writers of Apex Online. Apex Book Company has since released a number of novels, nonfiction books and anthologies, including short story collections such as Let's Play White by Chesya Burke, anthologies such as Dark Faith edited by Jerry Gordon and Maurice Broaddus, and novels such as An Occupation of Angels by Lavie Tidhar.

Other books published by the company include the first English translation of ChloroPhilia by Cristina Jurado, a finalist for the Spanish Ignotus Award. The press has also published The Apex Book of World SF anthology series edited by Lavie Tidhar (with the last volume edited by Mahvesh Murad and Tidhar) and the Nebula and Philip K. Dick Award-finalist Plague Birds by Jason Sanford.

In 2018, LitReactor named Apex Book Company one of the ten best independent horror presses, adding that "With a knack for picking works that have a literary bent, Apex always delivers the goods when it comes to horror and fantasy."

Apex Book Company is distributed by Independent Publishers Group.

== Awards and honors ==
- In 2022, Apex Magazine won the British Fantasy Award for Best Magazine/Periodical.
- Apex Magazine was a finalist for the Hugo Award for Best Semiprozine in 2012, 2013, and 2014.
- "If You Were a Dinosaur, My Love" by Rachel Swirsky from the magazine's March 2013 issue won the Nebula Award for Best Short Story and was a finalist for the Hugo, Locus, and World Fantasy Awards.
- "Jackalope Wives" by Ursula Vernon from the magazine's January 2014 issue won the Nebula Award for Best Short Story, the WSFA Small Press Award, and was a finalist for the World Fantasy Awards.
- "The Tomato Thief" by Ursula Vernon from the magazine's January 2016 issue won Hugo Award for Best Novelette and the WSFA Small Press Award.
- "Welcome to Your Authentic Indian Experience™" by Rebecca Roanhorse from the magazine's August 2017 issue won both the Nebula and Hugo Award for Best Short Story, along with being a finalist for the Locus, Theodore Sturgeon, and World Fantasy Awards.
- "A Witch's Guide to Escape: A Practical Compendium of Portal Fantasies" by Alix E. Harrow from the magazine's February 2018 issue won the Hugo Award for Best Short Story along with being a finalist for the Nebula, Locus, World Fantasy and Eugie Awards.
