= Jason Sizemore =

American writer and editor

Jason Sizemore is an American writer and editor based in Lexington, Kentucky. He is the owner and managing editor of Apex Publications.

== Early life ==
Sizemore was born in Big Creek, Kentucky (pop. 400).

== Career ==
Sizemore was the editor and publisher of Apex Digest, a quarterly science fiction and horror digest that ran for 12 issues between 2005 and 2008. As the publisher/managing editor of Apex Magazine, he was nominated for the Hugo Award in the semiprozine category in 2012, 2013 and 2014.

As a writer he has published several stories in genre magazines. His first short story collection, Irredeemable, was published in April, 2014.

== Bibliography ==
=== Collections ===
- Irredeemable (2014) ISBN 978-1-937929-59-6.

=== Fiction ===
- Life Imitating Art, Version 1A – The Lunatic Chameleon, Issue Two.
- Life Imitating Art, Version 1B – Whispers of Wickedness.
- The Boiler Room – Lost in the Dark (no longer published).
- Gus's Good day – Swamp.net (no longer published).
- Blue Lights – The Wheel, Spring 2005.
- Preacher Ira May Bowling – Mt. Zion Press, Issue #1.
- Faithless – Surreal, Issue #4
- The Sleeping Quartet – Forgotten Worlds, Issue #6
- An Ingenious Adventure – Future Syndicate Anthology ISBN 978-1-4196-5459-6 (2007).
- The Horror of It All (Four Sizemore Stories)
- Breaking Up Is Hard to Do
- God Needs Not The Future - Streets of Shadows ISBN 978-1-939840-21-9 (2014).
- Yellow Warblers ISBN 978-0-9821596-5-1 (2009).

=== Nonfiction ===
- Silent Hill Game reviews – Issue #9, City Slab
- Resident Evil Game Reviews – Issue #8, City Slab

=== Books edited ===
- Aegri Somnia (with Gill Ainsworth) ISBN 978-0-9788676-2-1 (2006).
- Gratia Placenti: For the Sake of Pleasing (with Gill Ainsworth) ISBN 978-0-9788676-5-2 (2007).
- Descended From Darkness: Apex Magazine Vol. 1 (with Gill Ainsworth) ISBN 978-0-9788676-9-0 (2008).
- Apexology: Horror ASIN B00408AO0Y (2010).
- Dark Futures: Tales of SF Dystopia ISBN 978-0-9826197-2-8 (2010).
- The Zombie Feed Vol. 1 ISBN 978-0-9821596-4-4 (2011).
- Appalachian Undead (with Jonathan Maberry) ISBN 978-1-937009-18-2 (2013).
