= Strange Horizons =

Online speculative fiction magazine

- Editor-in-chief: Gautam Bhatia
- Former editors: Jane Crowley; Kate Dollarhyde; Niall Harrison; Susan Marie Groppi; Mary Anne Mohanraj
- Categories: Speculative fiction
- Frequency: Weekly
- Founder: Mary Anne Mohanraj
- First issue: September 2000
- Based in: Utah
- Language: English
- Website: strangehorizons.com
- OCLC: 56474213

Strange Horizons is an online speculative fiction magazine. It also features speculative poetry and non-fiction in every issue, including reviews, essays, interviews, and roundtables.

== History and profile ==
It was launched in September 2000, and publishes new material (fiction, articles, reviews, poetry, and/or art) 51 weeks of the year, with an emphasis on "new, underrepresented, and global voices." The magazine was founded by writer and editor Mary Anne Mohanraj. It is registered with the IRS as 501(c)(3) non-profit organization. It has a staff of approximately sixty volunteers, and is unusual among professional speculative fiction magazines in being funded entirely by donations, holding annual fund drives.

== Editors-in-chief ==
- Mary Anne Mohanraj, 2000–2003
- Susan Marie Groppi, 2004–2010
- Niall Harrison, 2010–2017
- Jane Crowley and Kate Dollarhyde, 2017–2019
- Vanessa Rose Phin, 2019–2021
- Gautam Bhatia, 2021–present

== Awards ==
Susan Marie Groppi won the World Fantasy Special Award—Non-professional in 2010 for her work as Editor-in-Chief on Strange Horizons. The magazine itself was a finalist for the Hugo Award for Best Website in 2002 and 2005. The magazine won the Hugo Award for Best Semiprozine in 2024, after being a finalist every year from 2013 onward. Strange Horizons won The Community Award for Outstanding Efforts in Service of Inclusion and Equitable Practice in Genre, presented by the Ignyte Awards, in 2020.

The short story "The House Beyond Your Sky" by Benjamin Rosenbaum, published in 2006 in the magazine, was nominated for a 2007 Hugo Award for Best Short Story. "Selkie Stories Are for Losers" by Sofia Samatar was nominated for a Hugo Award for Best Short Story in 2014. Other stories in Strange Horizons have been nominated for the Nebula and other awards. Three stories published in Strange Horizons have won the Theodore Sturgeon Award.

=== Awards to magazine and editors ===
| Award | Category | Year | Nominee | Result | Ref |
|---|---|---|---|---|---|
| Hugo Award | Hugo–Best Website | 2002 | http://www.strangehorizons.com | Nominated | |
| Hugo Award | Hugo–Best Website | 2005 | http://www.strangehorizons.com | Nominated | |
| Hugo Award | Hugo–Best Semiprozine | 2013 | Niall Harrison, with Rebecca Cross, Jed Hartman, Brit Mandelo, Dave Nadgeman, Abigail Nussbaum, AJ Odasso, An Owomoyela, Julia Rios, Sonya Taaffe | Nominated | |
| Hugo Award | Hugo–Best Semiprozine | 2014 | Niall Harrison, with Rebecca Cross, Shane Gavin, Anaea Lay, Brit Mandelo, Abigail Nussbaum, AJ Odasso, An Owomoyela, Julia Rios, Sonya Taaffe | Nominated | |
| Hugo Award | Hugo–Best Semiprozine | 2015 | Niall Harrison, editor-in-chief | Nominated | |
| Hugo Award | Hugo–Best Semiprozine | 2016 | Catherine Krahe, AJ Odasso, Vanessa Rose Phin, Julia Rios, Maureen Kincaid Speller, eds. | Nominated | |
| Hugo Award | Hugo–Best Semiprozine | 2017 | Niall Harrison, ed., with additional editors Vajra Chandrasekera, Li Chua, Catherine Krahe, Anaea Lay, Tim Moore, AJ Odasso, Vanessa Rose Phin, Aishwarya Subramanian (and the Strange Horizons staff) | Nominated | |
| Hugo Award | Hugo–Best Semiprozine | 2018 | Kate Dollarhyde, Gautam Bhatia, AJ Odasso (additional editors: Lila Garrott, Heather McDougal, Ciro Faienza, Tahlia Day, Vanessa Rose Phin, and the Strange Horizons staff) | Nominated | |
| Hugo Award | Hugo–Best Semiprozine | 2019 | ed. by Jane Crowley and Kate Dollarhyde, with Vanessa Rose Phin, Vajra Chandrasekera, AJ Odasso, Romie Stott, Maureen Kincaid Speller (and the Strange Horizons Staff) | Nominated | |
| Hugo Award | Hugo–Best Semiprozine | 2020 | Vanessa Rose Phin, with Joyce Chng, Dan Hartland, Catherine Krahe, Dante Luiz, AJ Odasso (and the Strange Horizons staff) | Nominated | |
| Hugo Award | Hugo–Best Semiprozine | 2021 | Vanessa Rose Phin, et al. | Nominated | |
| Hugo Award | Hugo–Best Semiprozine | 2022 | The Strange Horizons Editorial Collective | Nominated | |
| Hugo Award | Hugo–Best Semiprozine | 2023 | The Strange Horizons Editorial Collective | Nominated | |
| Hugo Award | Hugo–Best Semiprozine | 2024 | The Strange Horizons Editorial Collective | Won | |
| Hugo Award | Hugo–Best Semiprozine | 2025 | The Strange Horizons Editorial Collective | Nominated | |
| Hugo Award | Hugo–Best Semiprozine | 2026 | The Strange Horizons Editorial Collective | Nominated | |
| Ignyte Award | Community Award | 2026 | Strange Horizons | Won | |
| World Fantasy Award | WFA–Non-Professional | 2007 | Susan Marie Groppi | Nominated | |
| World Fantasy Award | WFA–Non-Professional | 2010 | Susan Marie Groppi | Won | |
| World Fantasy Award | WFA–Non-Professional | 2022 | Vanessa Rose Phin, Gautam Bhatia | Nominated | |
| British Fantasy Award | BFA– Magazine/Periodical | 2011 | Susan Marie Groppi, Niall Harrison | Nominated | |
| British Fantasy Award | BFA– Magazine/Periodical | 2016 | Niall Harrison | Nominated | |
| British Fantasy Award | BFA– Magazine/Periodical | 2021 | Vanessa Rose Phin | Won | |
| Locus Awards | Locus–Magazine | 2006 | Strange Horizons | Nominated–8th | |
| Locus Awards | Locus–Magazine | 2007 | Strange Horizons | Nominated–4th | |
| Locus Awards | Locus–Magazine | 2008 | Strange Horizons | Nominated–9th | |
| Locus Awards | Locus–Magazine | 2009 | Strange Horizons | Nominated–10th | |
| Locus Awards | Locus–Magazine | 2010 | Strange Horizons | Nominated–6th | |
| Locus Awards | Locus–Magazine | 2011 | Strange Horizons | Nominated–7th | |
| Locus Awards | Locus–Magazine | 2012 | Strange Horizons | Nominated–8th | |
| Locus Awards | Locus–Magazine | 2013 | Strange Horizons | Nominated–8th | |
| Locus Awards | Locus–Magazine | 2014 | Strange Horizons | Nominated–9th | |
| Locus Awards | Locus–Magazine | 2015 | Strange Horizons | Nominated–7th | |
| Locus Awards | Locus–Magazine | 2016 | Strange Horizons | Nominated–10th | |
| Locus Awards | Locus–Magazine | 2017 | Strange Horizons | Nominated–9th | |
| Locus Awards | Locus–Magazine | 2018 | Strange Horizons | Nominated–7th | |
| Locus Awards | Locus–Magazine | 2019 | Strange Horizons | Nominated–9th | |
| Locus Awards | Locus–Magazine | 2020 | Strange Horizons | Nominated–8th | |
| Locus Awards | Locus–Magazine | 2021 | Strange Horizons | Nominated–7th | |
| Locus Awards | Locus–Magazine | 2022 | Strange Horizons | Nominated–7th | |
| Locus Awards | Locus–Editor | 2006 | Susan Marie Groppi | Nominated–27th | |
| Locus Awards | Locus–Editor | 2007 | Susan Marie Groppi | Nominated–20th | |
| Locus Awards | Locus–Editor | 2008 | Susan Marie Groppi | Nominated–23rd | |
| Locus Awards | Locus–Editor | 2016 | Niall Harrison | Nominated–28th | |

== See also ==
- Fantasy fiction magazine
- Science fiction magazine
