= Chesley Award for Best Cover Illustration – Magazine =

The Chesley Award for Best Cover Illustration - Magazine Art is given by the Association of Science Fiction and Fantasy Artists (ASFA) to recognize achievements in the illustration of science fiction & fantasy magazines eligible in the year previous to the award.

== Winners and nominees ==
| Year | Winner | Magazine | Other nominees |
|---|---|---|---|
| 1985 | Bob Walters | Asimov's, December 1984 | |
| 1987 | Bob Eggleton | Asimov's, January 1987 | |
| 1988 | Terry Lee | Amazing, January 1988 | |
| 1989 | Bob Eggleton | Asimov's, July 1988 | |
| 1990 | Frank Kelly Freas; Laura Brodian Kelly-Freas | Marion Zimmer Bradley's Fantasy Magazine, Autumn 1989 | |
| 1991 | Bob Eggleton | Aboriginal, January 1990 | |
| 1992 | David Mattingly | Amazing, September 1991 | |
| 1993 | Michael Whelan | Asimov's, November 1992 | |
| 1994 | Wojtek Siudmak | Asimov's, December 1993 | |
| 1995 (tie) | Bob Eggleton | Asimov's, August 1994 | |
| 1995 (tie) | Wojtek Siudmak | Analog, December 1994 | |
| 1996 | Bob Eggleton | Analog, January 1995 | |
| 1997 | Bob Eggleton | Fantasy & Science Fiction, May 1996 | |
| 1998 | Todd Lockwood | Dragon, August 1997 | |
| 1999 | Bob Eggleton | Fantasy & Science Fiction, May 1998 | |
| 2000 | Bob Eggleton | Fantasy & Science Fiction, August 1999 | |
| 2001 | Todd Lockwood | Dragon, July 2000 | |
| 2002 | James C. Christensen | The Leading Edge #41, April 2001 | |
| 2003 | Todd Lockwood | Dragon, December 2002 | |
| 2004 | Bob Eggleton | Fantasy & Science Fiction, July 2003 | |
| 2005 | Omar Rayyan | Spider, October 2004 | |
| 2006 | Donato Giancola | Asimov's, September 2005 | |
| 2007 | Renee LeCompte | Fantasy Magazine, Summer 2006 | |
| 2008 | Cory Ench; Catska Ench | The Magazine of Fantasy & Science Fiction, March 2007 | |
| 2009 | Matts Minnhagen | Clarkesworld #19, April 2008 ("Floating Fish") | Bob Eggleton for Asimov's Science Fiction, August 2008 ("Hammerfall"); David A. Hardy for The Magazine of Fantasy & Science Fiction, June 2008; Maurizio Manzieri for The Magazine of Fantasy & Science Fiction, April 2008; John Picacio for Asimov's Science Fiction, September 2008 |
| 2010 | John Picacio | Asimov's, September 2009 | Adam Tredowski for Interzone #220, January/February 2009; Les Edwards for Cemetery Dance, October 2009; Bob Eggleton for Analog Science Fiction and Fact, October 2009; Kazuhiko Nakamura for Clarkesworld #38, November 2009 ("Brain Tower"); David Palumbo for Heavy Metal, November 2009; David A. Hardy for The Magazine of Fantasy & Science Fiction, November 2009 |
| 2011 | Nick Greenwood | Orson Scott Card's InterGalactic Medicine Show #17, June 2010 | Julie Dillon for Clarkesworld #48, September 2010 ("Honeycomb"); David A. Hardy for Analog, April 2010; Audrey Lazarev for Clarkesworld #50, November 2010 ("Soulhunter"); Sergio Rebolledo for Clarkesworld #40, January 2010 ("Warm"); James Ryman for Heavy Metal, January 2010 |
| 2012 | Lee Moyer | Weird Tales, Winter 2010/2011 | Facundo Diaz for Clarkesworld #57, June 2011 ("Off Road"); Laura Diehl for Fantasy, August 2011; Carly B. Sorge for Apex Magazine, September 2011; Dariusz Zawadski for Fantasy, May 2011 |
| 2013 | Ken Barthelmey | Clarkesworld #74, November 2012 ("New World") | Julie Dillon, Clarkesworld #73, October 2012 ("Breaking Through"); Bob Eggleton Famous Masters of Filmland #262, July/August 2012; Martin Faragasso, Clarkesworld #71, August 2012 ("Space Journey"); David Palumbo, Creepy #9, Dark Horse, July 2012; Craig J. Spearing, Dragon #418, December 2012 |
| 2014 | Dan Dos Santos | Fables #136, December 2013 | Julie Dillon, Clarkesworld #87, December 2013 ("Elliptic"); Maurizio Manzieri, The Magazine of Fantasy & Science Fiction, March/April 2013; Cynthia Sheppard, Bull Spec, Spring 2013 |
| 2015 | Julie Dillon | Analog, April 2014 | Matt Dixon, Clarkesworld #90, March 2014 ("Hollow"); Wayne Haag, Interzone #253, July/August 2014; Patrick Jones, Analog, March 2014; Jae Lee, Batman/Superman #14; Peter Mohrbacher, Lightspeed #48, May 2014 |
| 2016 | Tran Nguyen | Uncanny Magazine #4, May/June 2015 ("Traveling to a Distant Day") | Maurizio Manzieri, Asimov's, October/November 2015; Reiko Murakami, Lightspeed #63, August 2015; Greg Ruth, Alabaster: The Good, the Bad, and the Bird #1; shichigoro-shingo, Clarkesworld #109, October 2015 ("A-boushi-ya") |
| 2017 | Galen Dara | Uncanny Magazine #10, May/June 2016 (“Bubbles and Blast Off”) | Elizabeth Leggett, Lightspeed #69, February 2016; David Palumbo, Aliens – Life and Death #1 ("Swallowed Whole"); Paolo Rivera, Hellboy and the B.P.R.D.: 1953 #1; Jeremy Wilson, Chimera Brigade #1 |
| 2018 | Ingrid Kallick | Cricket Magazine, January 2017 | Julie Dillon, Clarkesworld #128, May 2017 ("Darkess"); Eddie Mendoza, Clarkesworld #130, July 2017 ("Genetics Lab"); Reiko Murakami, Lightspeed #82, March 2017 ("The Worldless"); Sergei Sarichev, Clarkesworld #126, March 2017 ("Jungle Deep") |
| 2019 | Arthur Haas | Clarkesworld #140, May 2018 ("Meeting") | Cindy Fan, Strange Horizons, 19 November 2018; Donato Giancola, Analog Science Fiction and Fact, March/April 2018; Sean Murray, Clarkesworld #141, June 2018 ("The Storkfriars"); Greg Ruth, Stranger Things #2 (variant), 31 October 2018 |
| 2020 | Evan Cagle | Buffy the Vampire Slayer: The Chosen Ones #1, August 2019 | Yoshitaka Amano, Blood Borne #12, June 2019; Matt Dixon, Clarkesworld #152, May 2019 ("Vertigo"); Tiffany England, Cricket Magazine, October 2019 ("Into the Wild Blue Yonder"); Reiko Murakami, Lightspeed #104, January 2019 ("With Teeth Unmake the Sun") |
| 2021 | Francesca Resta | Clarkesworld #169, October 2020 ("Ancient Stones") | Arjun Amky, Clarkesworld #170, October 2020 ("Alien Scout"); Evan Cagle, Stranger Things: Into the Fire #4 (variant), 8 July 2020; Rodion Shaldo, Clarkesworld #168, October 2020 ("51"); Tithi Luadthong, Lightspeed #123, August 2020; Tim O'Brien, Time, 17 August 2020 ("The Plague Election") |
2022
| 2023 | Tehani Farr | Eternus #1 (metal variant), October 2022 | Ed Binkley, Bourbon Penn #26, March 2022; Zezhou Chen, Clarkesworld #184, January 2022 ("Return to Heaven 7"); Daniel Conway, Clarkesworld #193, October 2022 ("Art Block"); JC Jongwon Park, Clarkesworld #185, February 2022 ("Talk") |
