= Genevieve Valentine =

American novelist

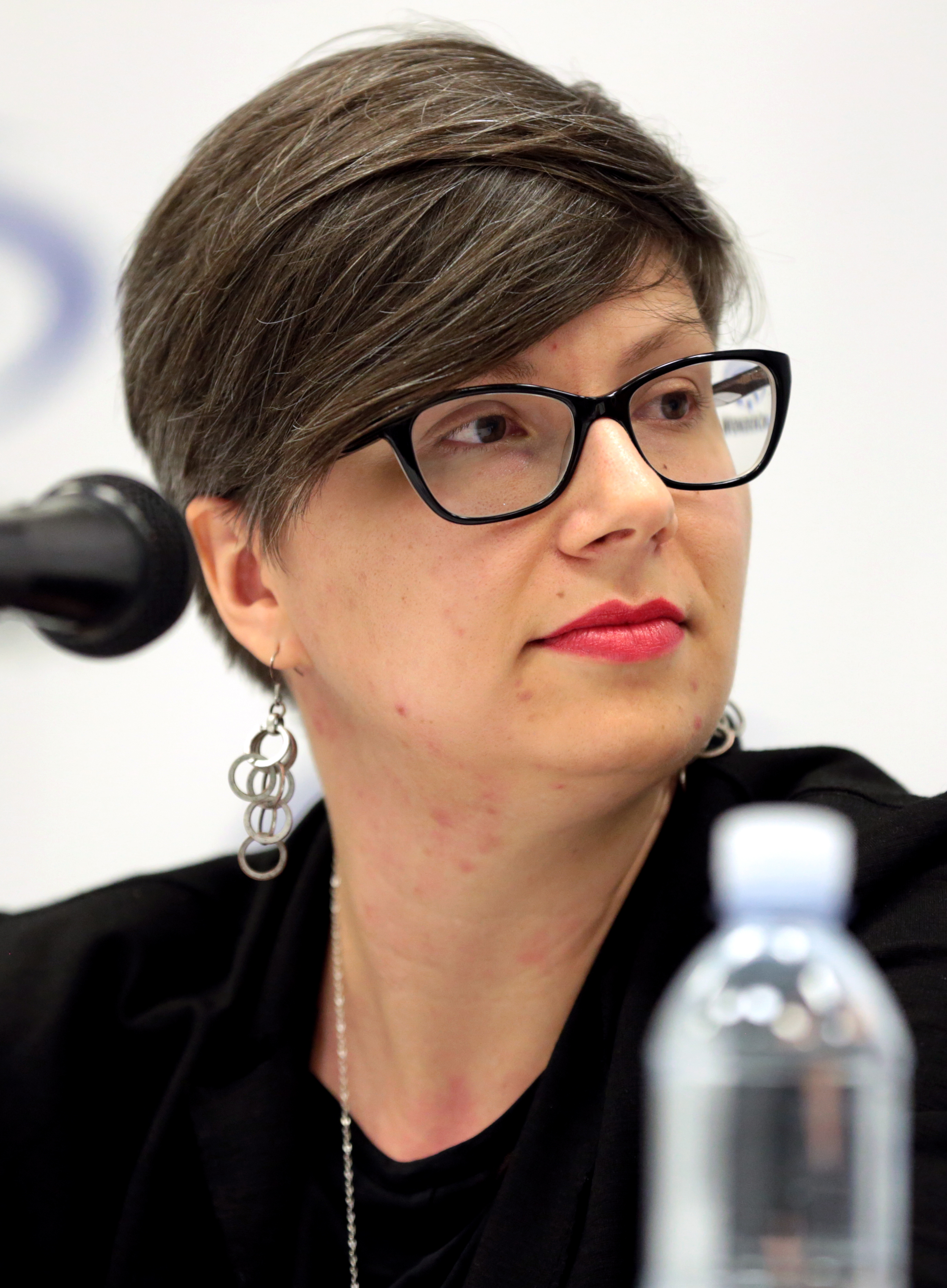
- Valentine at WonderCon 2017
- Born: 1981 (age 44–45)
- Education: George Mason University
- Occupations: Novelist; comic book writer; critic
- Writing career
- Genres: Fantasy, steampunk, science fiction
- Notable awards: Crawford Award (2012)
- Website: www.genevievevalentine.com

Genevieve Valentine (born 1981) is an American science fiction and fantasy author, comic book writer, and cultural critic. Her first novel, Mechanique: A Tale of the Circus Tresaulti, won the Crawford Award and was a finalist for the Nebula Award.

== Early life and education ==
Genevieve Valentine was born into a military family. She spent her childhood growing up across California, Texas, Illinois, and Virginia. She earned a degree in English from George Mason University.

== Career ==
Valentine's short stories have been featured in Clarkesworld, Lightspeed Magazine, Conjunctions, Asimov's, Strange Horizons, Apex Magazine, Fantasy Magazine, and more. Her short stories have appeared in over a dozen anthologies, including The Living Dead 2, The Way of the Wizard, Running with the Pack, and The Best American Science Fiction and Fantasy. Her stories have been nominated for multiple awards, such as the Shirley Jackson Award and World Fantasy Award.

Her second novel, The Girls at the Kingfisher Club, was published in 2014. For NPR, Amal El-Mohtar described the book as, "the best fairy tale retelling I've ever read."

She wrote The Persona Series for Saga Press, (edited by Navah Wolfe), a science fiction thriller series which includes the novels Persona (2015) and Icon (2016).

From 2014 to 2015, Valentine scripted a new series for DC Comics featuring Catwoman, working with artists Garry Brown and David Messina. Afterwards, she worked on Batman and Robin Eternal as scripter.

Valentine's new comic series, Two Graves, is illustrated in competing points of view by Annie Wu and Ming Doyle. It premiered in November 2022 from Image Comics. The story is described as "a contemporary Persephone myth retelling."

Her cultural criticism has appeared in NPR, The AV Club, Los Angeles Review of Books, Vice, Vox, and The New York Times, among others. Her nonfiction has appeared in Lightspeed Magazine, Weird Tales, Tor.com, and Fantasy Magazine.

== Bibliography ==
=== Novels ===
- Mechanique: A Tale of the Circus Tresaulti. Rockville, Md.: Prime Books. 2011. ISBN 1607012537.
- The Girls at the Kingfisher Club (First Atria Books hardcover ed.). New York: Atria Books. 2014. ISBN 1476739080.
- Persona. Simon and Schuster. 2015. ISBN 1481425129.
- Icon. Simon and Schuster. 2016. ISBN 9781481425155.

=== Comics ===
- Catwoman (The New 52)
- Batman and Robin Eternal
- Xena Warrior Princess
- Two Graves

=== Anthology Appearances ===
- Ellen Datlow, ed. (2014). "She Drives the Men to Crimes of Passion!". The Cutting Room. Tachyon Publications. ISBN 9781616961671.
- Charles Yu; John Joseph Adams, eds. (2017). "Everyone From Themis Sends Letters Home". The Best American Science Fiction and Fantasy 2017. Mariner Books. ISBN 9780544973985.
- Mahvesh Murad; Jared Shurin, eds. (2019). The Outcast Hours. Solaris Books. ISBN 9781781085745.
- Ellen Datlow, ed. (2022). When Things Get Dark. Titan Books. ISBN 9781789097177.

Preceded by Ann Nocenti	Catwoman writer 2014–2015	Succeeded by Frank Tieri
