= A Separate Star =

A Separate Star is a 1984 book written by Frank Kelly Freas.

== Contents ==
A Separate Star is a book in which over 100 pieces of artwork by science-fiction artist Frank Kelly Freas are collected. The book serves as a visual showcase of Freas' talent, offering nearly half of its illustrations in color.

== Reception ==
C.J. Henderson reviewed A Separate Star for Different Worlds magazine and stated that "a picture is supposedly worth a thousand words. If such is the case, then A Separate Star has over a hundred-thousand words of particularly hard-sell waiting within to convince them."

== Reviews ==
- Review by William M. Schuyler, Jr. [as by William M. Schuyler] (1985) in Fantasy Review, March 1985
- Review by Stanley Schmidt (1985) in Analog Science Fiction/Science Fact, March 1985
- Review by Jo Duffy (1985) in Epic Illustrated, April 1985
- Review by Robert Coulson (1985) in Amazing Stories, May 1985
- Review by Algis Budrys (1985) in The Magazine of Fantasy & Science Fiction, June 1985
- Review by Roland J. Green (1985) in Far Frontiers, Volume III/Fall 1985
