= Theodora Goss =

American novelist (born 1968)

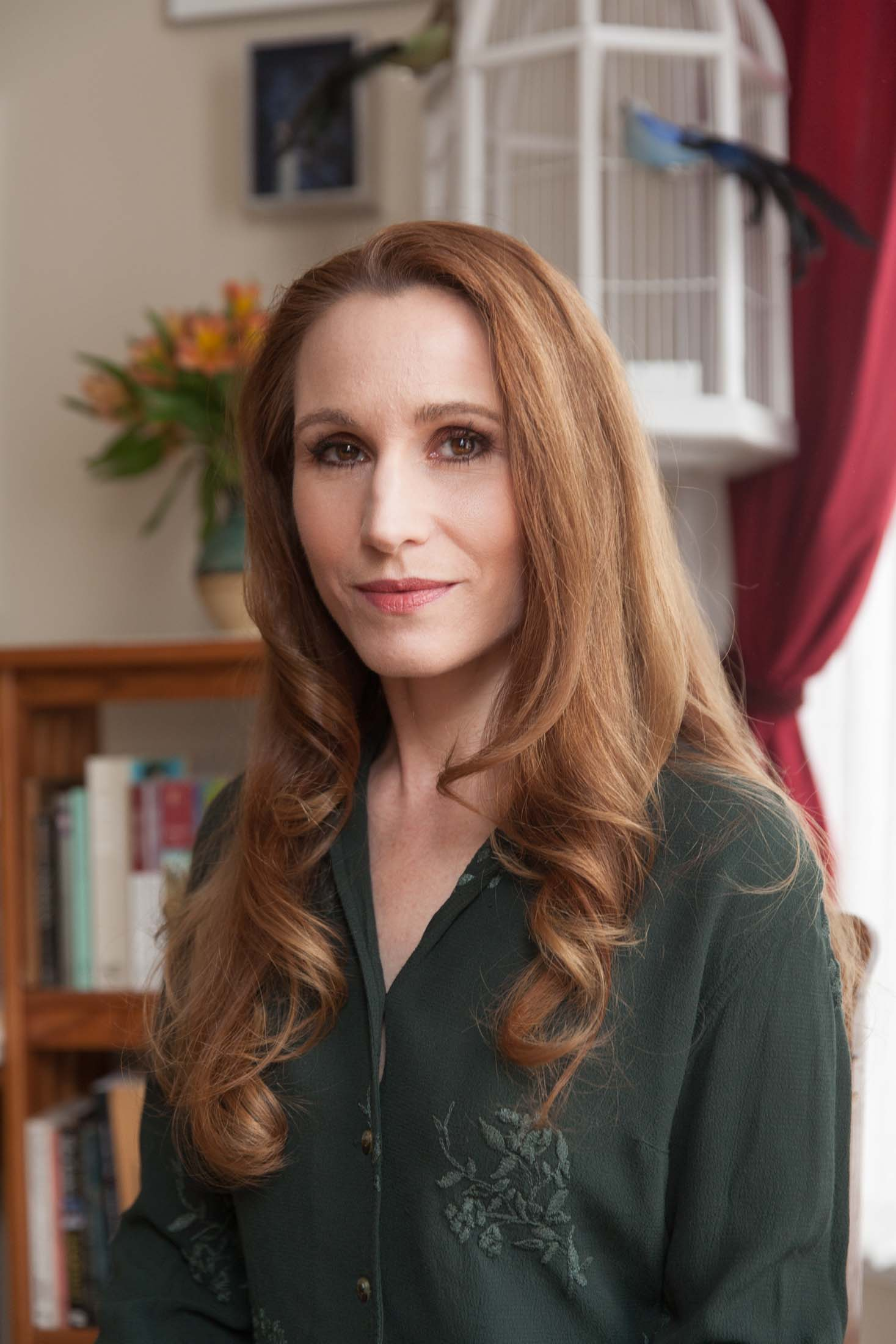
- Goss (photo by Matthew Stein Photography)
- Born: September 30, 1968 (age 58); Budapest, Hungary
- Education: University of Virginia (BA); Harvard Law School (JD); Boston University (MA, PhD)
- Occupation: Writer
- Writing career
- Period: 2002–present
- Genres: Fantasy, magic realism, fairy tales, poetry
- Notable work: The Strange Case of the Alchemist's Daughter (2017)
- Notable awards: Rhysling Award (2004); Rhysling Award (2017); World Fantasy Award (2008)
- Website: theodoragoss.com

Theodora Goss (born September 30, 1968) is a Hungarian-American fiction writer and poet. Her writing has been nominated for major awards, including the Nebula, Locus, Mythopoeic, World Fantasy, and Seiun Awards. Her short fiction and poetry have appeared in numerous magazines and anthologies, including Year's Best volumes.

== Biography ==
Theodora Goss was born in Hungary and immigrated to the United States as a child. She received her B.A. from the University of Virginia, a J.D. from Harvard Law School, and an M.A. and Ph.D. in English from Boston University She is also a graduate of the Odyssey and Clarion writing workshops, and sold her first published story, "The Rose in Twelve Petals," while a student at Clarion.

She teaches at Boston University and at the Stonecoast MFA Program in Creative Writing.

== Career ==
She has been a contributor to many publications including, Apex Magazine, Clarkesworld Magazine, The Journal of Mythic Arts, Exotic Gothic, Polyphony, Realms of Fantasy, Alchemy, Strange Horizons and Lady Churchill's Rosebud Wristlet; and anthologies The Year's Best Fantasy and Horror, The Year's Best Fantasy, The Year's Best Science Fiction and Fantasy for Teens, Best New Fantasy. She wrote an introduction to Mike Allen's book Disturbing Muses.

Goss's debut novel, The Strange Case of the Alchemist's Daughter, was published by Saga Press in June 2017, and a sequel, European Travel for the Monstrous Gentlewoman, was published by Saga Press in July 2018. The third book in the trilogy The Sinister Mystery of the Mesmerizing Girl, was published by Saga Press in October 2019.

== Awards ==
Theodora Goss's writing has been nominated for the 2017 Locus Award for "Red as Blood and White as Bone," the 2015 Mythopoeic Award for "Songs for Ophelia", the 2011 Locus Award for "The Mad Scientist's Daughter," the 2008 Mythopoeic Award for "In the Forest of Forgetting", the 2007 Nebula Award for "Pip and the Fairies", and the 2005 World Fantasy Award for Best Short Fiction for "The Wings of Meister Wilhelm".

She won the 2026 Rhysling Award for Best Short Poem for "How to Become a Sea Witch," the 2017 Rhysling Award for Best Long Poem for "Rose Child" and the 2004 Rhysling Award for Best Long Poem for "Octavia is Lost in the Hall of Masks". In 2008, her story "Singing of Mount Abora" won the World Fantasy Award for Best Short Fiction.

Her 2017 novel The Strange Case of the Alchemist's Daughter was a finalist for the 2017 Nebula Award and the 2018 Compton Crook Award for best first novel.

Her 2019 short story "How to Become a Witch-Queen" was a finalist for the 2019 Shirley Jackson Award for short fiction.

Her poem "How to Become a Sea Witch" was a finalist for a Hugo Award in 2026.

Her story "The Secret Diary of Mina Harker" was a finalist for the 2026 World Fantasy Award for Best Long Fiction. Her short story collection Letters from an Imaginary Country was a finalist for the 2026 World Fantasy Award for Best Collection.

== Works ==
=== Books ===
==== The Extraordinary Adventures of the Athena Club ====
- The Strange Case of the Alchemist's Daughter (2017). Saga Press. ISBN 978-1-4814-6650-9
- European Travel for the Monstrous Gentlewoman (2018). Saga Press. ISBN 1481466534
- The Sinister Mystery of the Mesmerizing Girl (2019). Saga Press. ISBN 1534427872

==== Standalone books ====
- In the Forest of Forgetting (2006). Prime Books. ISBN 0-8095-5691-X
  - Some of the stories in this volume were previously published in The Rose in Twelve Petals & Other Stories.
- The Thorn and the Blossom: A Two-Sided Love Story (2012), with Scott Mckowen. Quirk Books. ISBN 159474551X
- Snow White Learns Witchcraft: Stories and Poems (2019). Mythic Delirium Books. ISBN 9781386202820
- The Collected Enchantments (2023). Mythic Delirium Books. ISBN 978-1-73264-407-6
- Letters from an Imaginary Country (2025). Tachyon Publications. ISBN 978-1-61696-440-5

=== Books edited ===
- (with Delia Sherman) Interfictions: An Anthology of Interstitial Writing (2007). Interstitial Arts Foundation. ISBN 1931520240
- Voices from Fairyland: The Fantastical Poems of Mary Coleridge, Charlotte Mew and Sylvia Townsend Warner (2008). Aqueduct Press. ISBN 1933500212

=== Short fiction ===
- "The Rose in Twelve Petals," Realms of Fantasy, April 2002.
- "The Rapid Advance of Sorrow," Lady Churchill's Rosebud Wristlet, 11, November 2002.
- "Professor Berkowitz Stands on the Threshold," Polyphony 2, April 2003.
- "In the Forest of Forgetting," Realms of Fantasy, October 2003.
- "Sleeping with Bears," Strange Horizons, November 2003.
- "Lily, with Clouds," Alchemy 1, December 2003.
- "Miss Emily Gray," Alchemy 2, August 2004.
- "The Wings of Meister Wilhelm," Polyphony 4, September 2004.
- "The Belt," Flytrap 4, May 2005.
- "A Statement in the Case," Realms of Fantasy, August 2005.
- "Pip and the Fairies," Strange Horizons, October 2005.
- "Death Comes for Ervina," Polyphony 5, November 2005.
- "Lessons with Miss Gray," Fantasy Magazine, 2, April 2006.
- "Letters from Budapest," Alchemy 3, May 2006.
- "Singing of Mount Abora," Logorrhea: Good Words Make Good Stories, 2007.
- "Princess Lucinda and the Hound of the Moon," Realms of Fantasy, June 2007.
- "Catherine and the Satyr," Strange Horizons, October 2007.
- "England under the White Witch," Clarkesworld Magazine, 73, October 2012.
- "Beautiful Boys," Asimov's Science Fiction, August 2012.
- "Woola's Song," Under the Moons of Mars, 2012.
- "Christopher Raven," Ghosts by Gaslight, 2011.
- "Pug," Asimov's Science Fiction, July 2011.
- "Fair Ladies," Apex Magazine, August 2010.
- "The Mad Scientist's Daughter," Strange Horizons, January 2010.
- "Her Mother's Ghosts," Clarkesworld Magazine, 23, August 2008.
- "The Puma," Apex Magazine, March 2009.
- "Csilla's Story," Other Earths, April 2009.
- "Child-Empress of Mars," Interfictions 2, 2009.
- "Estella Saves the Village," Queen Victoria's Book of Spells, 2013.
- "Lost Girls of Oz," Oz Reimagined: New Tales from the Emerald City and Beyond, 2013.
- "Blanchefleur," Once Upon a Time: New Fairy Tales, 2013.
- "Elena's Egg," Exotic Gothic 5, 2013.
- "Cimmeria: From the Journal of Imaginary Anthropology," Lightspeed Magazine, July 2014.
- "In Autumn," Daily Science Fiction, November 13, 2015.
- "Red as Blood and White as Bone," Tor.com, May 4, 2016.
- "The Other Thea," The Starlit Wood, 2016.
- "To Budapest, With Love," Uncanny Magazine, 14, January/February 2017.
- "Come See the Living Dryad," Tor.com, March 9, 2017.
- "Snow, Blood, Fur" Daily Science Fiction, November 17, 2017.
- "How to Become a Witch-Queen," Hex Life: Wicked New Tales of Witchery, 2019.
