= I Sexually Identify as an Attack Helicopter =

2020 short story by Isabel Fall

- Short story by Isabel Fall
- Language: English
- Genre: Military science fiction

Publication
- Published in: Clarkesworld Magazine
- Media type: Online
- Publication date: 1 January 2020

"I Sexually Identify as an Attack Helicopter" is a military science fiction short story by Isabel Fall, published on 1 January 2020 in Clarkesworld Magazine. The story relates the experience of Barb, an originally female helicopter pilot whose gender was reassigned to "attack helicopter" as a method of improving pilot performance. The story was a finalist for the 2021 Hugo Award, under the title "Helicopter Story".

The story's original title is taken from an Internet meme used to disparage transgender people. Some read the story as transphobic or as trolling, and at Fall's request, Clarkesworld withdrew the story after Fall—a transgender woman—was harassed because of it. This caused a discussion among writers and critics about the merits of art that some perceive as hurtful.

== Synopsis ==
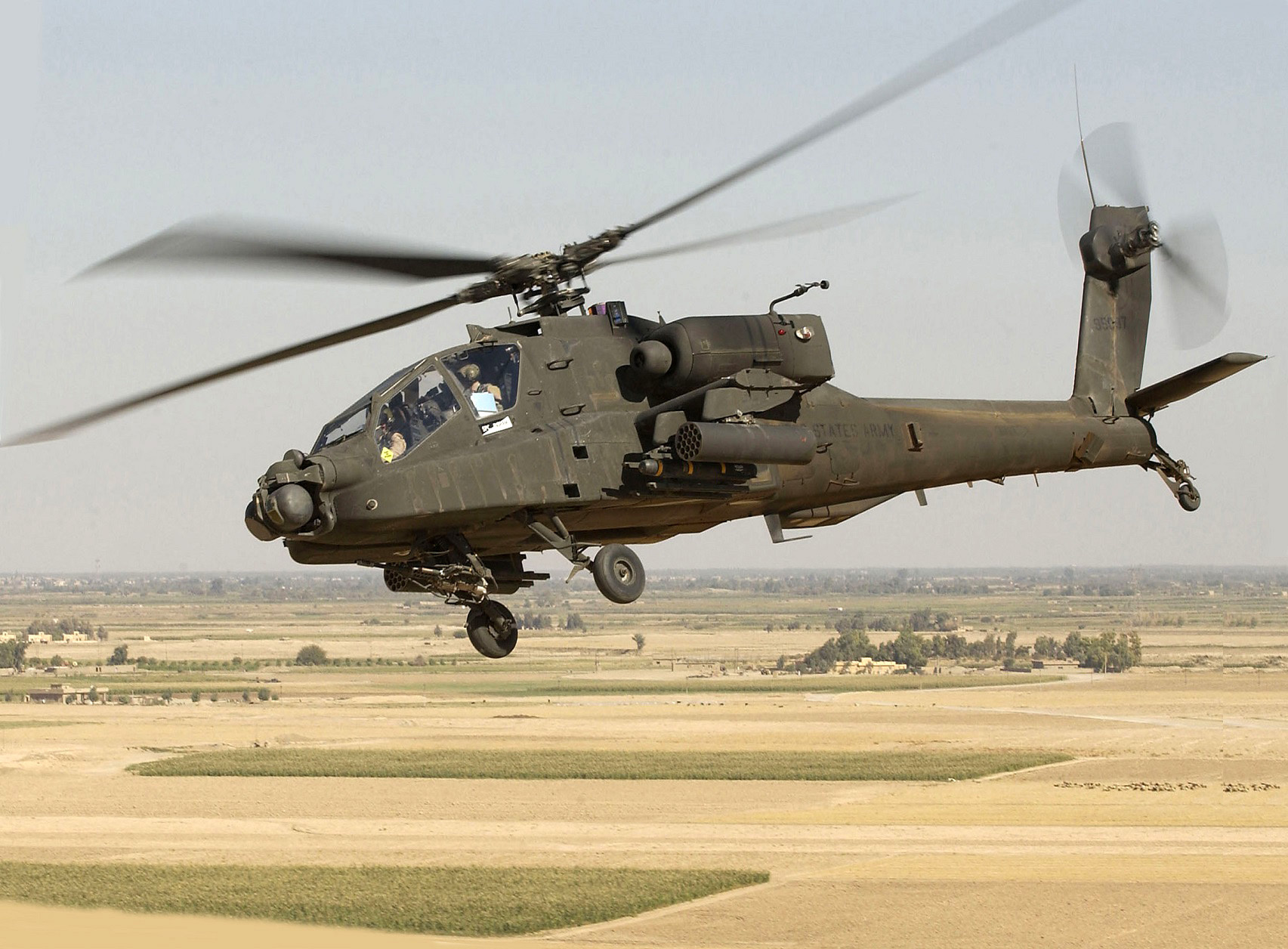
The helicopter flown by the protagonist is the fictional "AH-70 Apache Mystic", possibly related to the AH-64 Apache shown here.

Some time in the near future, the United States is fighting a war against the "Pear Mesa Budget Committee", a local AI government that emerged from an environmental and medical catastrophe on the Gulf Coast. The story is told from the perspective of Barb (a call sign, not "Barbara"), formerly called Seo Ji Hee. The U.S. Army neuromedically reassigned Barb's gender identity to "attack helicopter" to make Barb a better helicopter pilot. As a result, warfare is now part of Barb's gender role, much as wearing skirts would be part of a woman's.

The story interlaces scenes from the war, in which Barb and the gunner Axis bomb a high school and escape from an enemy aircraft, with recollections of Barb's previous life as a woman, and reflections about Barb's altered sexuality: the acts of flying, of controlled violence, are now also sexual acts between Barb and Axis. As they fly home, Barb consoles Axis, who struggles with their shared gender reassignment, considering that Axis' uncertainty and defiance of the assignment may reflect a "new queerness" as necessary as intentional instability is to combat aircraft.

== Publication history ==
=== Original meme ===
The phrase "I sexually identify as an attack helicopter" is a transphobic Internet meme, typically used, according to The Guardian, "to parody the evolving gender spectrum." The phrase originated as a copypasta in the online video game Team Fortress 2 and spread to forums such as Reddit and 4chan, where it was used (peaking in 2015) to mock transgender people.

=== Fall's story ===
Isabel Fall's story of the same title appeared on 1 January 2020 in the January issue (no. 160) of Clarkesworld Magazine. The accompanying biographical note read: "Isabel Fall was born in 1988". The story provoked "vehement" responses, according to Wired. Many readers appreciated the story, including the authors Carmen Maria Machado and Chuck Tingle; but there were also many loud detractors, many of whom were social justice activists and queer people. These readers objected to the use of an offensive meme as the title, and suspected that the story agreed with the meme's transphobia, or was an exercise in trolling.

The editor of Clarkesworld, Neil Clarke, removed the story from the online magazine's website a few days later. According to Clarke's initial note, the withdrawal was made at the author's request. In a later statement, Clarke explained that he had removed the story after a "barrage of attacks" on Fall, "for her own personal safety and health". He wrote that Fall was a trans woman, but had not been out as such at the time of publication, and used an intentionally short biography and "negligible" Internet presence. According to Clarke, the story was not a hoax, and Fall was not a Neo-Nazi (as some had assumed because "88" is a Neo-Nazi code). He wrote that the story was an attempt by Fall to "take away some of the power of that very hurtful meme" by subverting it. Clarke wrote that the story had been subject to many revisions and it had been reviewed by trans sensitivity readers, but he apologized "to those who were hurt by the story or the ensuing storms".

Neil Clarke wrote in April 2021 that Fall had retitled the work to "Helicopter Story" in late 2020, and that whether it would be made available again was up to her. Fall said in June 2021 that "the story was withdrawn to avoid my death," rather than in acknowledgment of supposed faults, and commented: "When people approve of its withdrawal they are approving, even if unwittingly, of the use of gender dysphoria to silence writers."

Isabel Fall donated her payment for the story to Trans Lifeline, a non-profit organization that offers support to trans people in crisis. Clarke matched her donation.

=== Impact on the author ===
As a result of the contentious debate about her story and the personal attacks made against her, Fall entered a psychiatric hospital because of suicidal ideation, and withdrew other works with similar themes in the process of publication. Being still early in the process of transition, she also decided to abandon that process, telling a journalist, "If other people want to put markings on my gender-sphere and decide what I am, fine, let them. It's not worth fighting". She said that she was particularly struck by comments that she must be a man because "no woman would ever write in the way she did", which she said increased her gender dysphoria.

=== Republication ===
The story was republished under the title "Helicopter Story" in the short story anthology The Big Book of Cyberpunk, edited by Jared Shurin, in 2023.

== Reception ==
=== Critical reception ===
Rocket Stack Rank favorably reviewed the story, noting that the author's transparent narration allowed her to effectively convey to cisgender people "a bit about what it means to be trans ... in a very different way than anything I've ever seen before." File 770 collected a number of reactions from science fiction writers and fans, some of which read the story as transphobic, while others appreciated it and deplored its removal. Emily St. James, reporting on Fall's story, commented that the paranoid mode in which the story was received by some was in part the result of then-recent right-wing trolling of the SF fandom by groups such as the Sad Puppies. Referencing work by Lee Mandelo, she noted that Twitter, because of its structural lack of context and nuance, amplifies paranoid readings of fiction (focusing on problems) instead of reparative readings (focusing on positive impact), which can create negative feedback loops, as in this case.

One of the story's critics, Arinn Dembo, the acting president of SF Canada, wrote that "this reads like it was written by a straight white dude who doesn't really get gender theory or transition & has no right to invoke transphobic dog whistles for profit". After the story's removal, Dembo initially stood by her critique, saying that "a lot of people might have been spared a lot of mental anguish" if a statement about Fall's identity and intentions had been provided. She later apologized to Fall. The writer N. K. Jemisin commented that she was "glad the story was taken down" and that "artists should strive to do no (more of this) harm." Jemisin later wrote that she had not read the story, and apologized also. The writer Neon Yang commented: "When the story was first published, we knew nothing about Isabel Fall’s identity, and there was a smattering of strange behavior around the comments and who was linking to it that led people to suspect right-wing trolls were involved in this. In hindsight, they were probably just drawn by the provocative title and possibly did not even read the story."

Other writers regretted the story's removal and the attacks on its writer: Robby Soave, a senior editor at Reason, called the story's removal an example of "cancel culture". Emily St. James of Vox wrote: "Art should embrace our weakness, our shame, and our doubt, too. To insist otherwise is its own kind of prejudice." Similarly, Conor Friedersdorf at The Atlantic wrote: "The controversy over 'Attack Helicopter' is another case study suggesting that rejecting 'art's [sic] for art's sake' in favor of 'art for justice's sake' doesn't necessarily yield more justice. It may help no one, harm many, and impede the ability of artists to circulate work that makes us think, feel, grapple, empathize, and learn." And at The Outline, Gretchen Felker-Martin criticized fans for believing that art should communicate moral lessons and that "minorities in fiction must be represented in a uniformly positive light", noting that censorship of controversial stories "constitute[s] a rejection of life's intrinsic complexity". Attacking stories such as Fall's just because some readers reacted with hurt to it, she wrote, blocked a necessary outlet for marginalized artists and represented "a retreat into the black and white moral absolutism of adolescence, or theocracy". Doris V. Sutherland commented that while it is normal for fiction to receive negative responses, the removal of the story from Clarkesworld created new problems by suggesting censorship is an acceptable solution.

=== Awards ===
The story was a finalist for the 2021 Hugo Award for Best Novelette, under the title "Helicopter Story". To qualify for another award, it was republished in a limited-edition e-book version. The Hugo nomination resulted in another round of social media criticism aimed at Clarke, this time for allegedly not doing enough to protect Fall.
