= Clarkesworld Magazine =

American online fantasy and science fiction magazine

- Cover of Clarkesworld Magazine's 8th issue, May 2007; also used as the mascot of the magazine as a whole
- Editor: Neil Clarke
- Categories: Fantasy, science fiction, and science fantasy
- Frequency: Monthly
- First issue: October 2006
- Company: Wyrm Publishing
- Country: United States
- Based in: Stirling, New Jersey
- Language: English
- Website: clarkesworldmagazine.com
- ISSN: 1937-7843

Clarkesworld Magazine is an American online fantasy and science fiction magazine edited by Neil Clarke. It released its first issue October 1, 2006, and has maintained a regular monthly schedule since, publishing fiction by authors such as Elizabeth Bear, Kij Johnson, Caitlín R. Kiernan, Sarah Monette, Catherynne M. Valente, Jeff VanderMeer and Peter Watts.

== Formats ==
Clarkesworld Magazine is published or collected in a number of formats:

- All fiction is collected annually in print anthologies published by Wyrm Publishing
- Apps are available for Android, iPad and iPhone devices
- EPUB, Amazon Kindle, and Mobipocket ebook editions of each issue are available for purchase
- All content is available online via the magazine website
- All fiction is available in audio format via podcast or direct download
- Ebook subscriptions for the Kindle and EPUB readers
- Print issues are sold on Amazon and also available as a Patreon subscription option

== History ==
Neil Clarke and Sean Wallace founded Clarkesworld Magazine in July 2006, originally as a companion to Clarkesworld Books, a now defunct online bookstore. The magazine published its first issue three months later.

In February 2007, Clarkesworld announced the first in a series of annual print anthologies starting with Realms: The First Year of Clarkesworld Magazine. It was published in June 2008 by Wyrm Publishing.

In January 2015, Clarkesworld began a relationship with Storycom to regularly translate and publish works of Chinese science fiction in their issues.

In February 2019, editor Neil Clarke announced that the magazine had received a grant from LTI Korea for the purposes of translating and publishing nine Korean science fiction stories in upcoming issues of Clarkesworld.

In January 2020, its editor Neil Clarke withdrew a short story by Isabel Fall at Fall's request, "I Sexually Identify as an Attack Helicopter", after Fall had been harassed by people who suspected the story of trolling or transphobia.

In November 2022, editor Neil Clarke announced that the magazine would be opening a submission period for science fiction written in Spanish.

In December 2022, Amazon declared that they would stop selling magazine subscriptions. Clarke called the announcement "devastating", and noted that they had been offered a chance to continue in Kindle Unlimited for less money.

On 20 February 2023, Clarkesworld temporarily closed submissions due to a sudden increase in AI-generated stories sent to the magazine. During the first weeks of 2023, the magazine received 35 times as many fake spam submissions (the magazine categorizes AI-generated stories as spam) as it did the previous year during the same time frame.

== Awards and recognition ==
=== Awards to magazine and editors ===
Award	Category	Year	Nominee	Result	Ref
Hugo Award	Semiprozine	2009	Neil Clarke, Nick Mamatas, Sean Wallace, eds.	Nominated	
Hugo Award	Semiprozine	2010	Neil Clarke, Cheryl Morgan, Sean Wallace, eds.	Won	
Hugo Award	Semiprozine	2011	Neil Clarke, Cheryl Morgan, Sean Wallace, eds.; podcast directed by Kate Baker	Won	
Hugo Award	Semiprozine	2013	Neil Clarke, Jason Heller, Sean Wallace, eds.; podcast directed by Kate Baker	Won	
Hugo Award	Professional Editor (Short Form)	2012	Neil Clarke	Nominated	
Hugo Award	Professional Editor (Short Form)	2013	Neil Clarke	Nominated	
Hugo Award	Professional Editor (Short Form)	2014	Neil Clarke	Nominated	
Hugo Award	Professional Editor (Short Form)	2016	Neil Clarke	Nominated	
Hugo Award	Professional Editor (Short Form)	2017	Neil Clarke	Nominated	
Hugo Award	Professional Editor (Short Form)	2018	Neil Clarke	Nominated	
Hugo Award	Professional Editor (Short Form)	2019	Neil Clarke	Nominated	
Hugo Award	Professional Editor (Short Form)	2020	Neil Clarke	Nominated	
Hugo Award	Professional Editor (Short Form)	2021	Neil Clarke	Nominated	
Hugo Award	Professional Editor (Short Form)	2022	Neil Clarke	Won	
Hugo Award	Professional Editor (Short Form)	2023	Neil Clarke	Won	
Hugo Award	Professional Editor (Short Form)	2024	Neil Clarke	Won	
World Fantasy Award	Non-Professional	2009	Neil Clarke, Nick Mamatas, Sean Wallace, eds.	Nominated	
World Fantasy Award	Non-Professional	2010	Neil Clarke, Cheryl Morgan, Sean Wallace, eds.	Nominated	
World Fantasy Award	Non-Professional	2012	Neil Clarke, Cheryl Morgan, Sean Wallace, eds.; podcast directed by Kate Baker	Nominated	
World Fantasy Award	Non-Professional	2014	Neil Clarke, Sean Wallace, eds.; podcast directed by Kate Baker	Won	
British Fantasy Award	Magazine/Periodical	2014	Neil Clarke, Sean Wallace, eds.; podcast directed by Kate Baker	Won	
Locus Awards	Magazine	2007	Clarkesworld Magazine	Nominated–20th	
Locus Awards	Magazine	2008	Clarkesworld Magazine	Nominated–14th	
Locus Awards	Magazine	2009	Clarkesworld Magazine	Nominated–9th	
Locus Awards	Magazine	2010	Clarkesworld Magazine	Nominated–4th	
Locus Awards	Magazine	2011	Clarkesworld Magazine	Nominated–6th	
Locus Awards	Magazine	2012	Clarkesworld Magazine	Nominated–3rd	
Locus Awards	Magazine	2013	Clarkesworld Magazine	Nominated–4th	
Locus Awards	Magazine	2014	Clarkesworld Magazine	Nominated–4th	
Locus Awards	Magazine	2015	Clarkesworld Magazine	Nominated–3rd	
Locus Awards	Magazine	2016	Clarkesworld Magazine	Nominated–4th	
Locus Awards	Magazine	2017	Clarkesworld Magazine	Nominated–5th	
Locus Awards	Magazine	2018	Clarkesworld Magazine	Nominated–5th	
Locus Awards	Magazine	2019	Clarkesworld Magazine	Nominated–5th	
Locus Awards	Magazine	2020	Clarkesworld Magazine	Nominated–5th	
Locus Awards	Magazine	2021	Clarkesworld Magazine	Nominated–6th	
Locus Awards	Magazine	2022	Clarkesworld Magazine	Nominated–6th	
Locus Awards	Magazine	2023	Clarkesworld Magazine	Nominated–3rd	
Locus Awards	Magazine	2024	Clarkesworld Magazine	Nominated–2nd	
Locus Awards	Magazine	2025	Clarkesworld Magazine	Won	
Locus Awards	Magazine	2026	Clarkesworld Magazine	Won	

=== Other honors ===
- Winner 2006 Million Writers Award for "Best New Online Magazine"
- Named SciFi.com Site of the Week: August 29, 2007

=== Art ===
- Winner 2009 Chesley Award for Best Magazine Cover, "Floating Fish", Mats Minnhagen (April 2008)
- Finalist 2010 Chesley Award for Best Magazine Cover, "Brain Tower", Kazuhiko Nakamura (November 2009)
- Finalist 2011 Chesley Award for Best Magazine Cover, "Warm", Sergio Rebolledo (January 2010)
- Finalist 2011 Chesley Award for Best Magazine Cover, "Honeycomb", Julie Dillon (September 2010)
- Finalist 2011 Chesley Award for Best Magazine Cover, "Soulhunter", Andrey Lazarev (November 2010)
- Finalist 2012 Chesley Award for Best Magazine Cover, "Off Road", Facundo Diaz (June 2011)
- Winner 2013 Chesley Award for Best Magazine Cover, "New World", Ken Barthelmey (November 2012)
- Finalist 2013 Chesley Award for Best Magazine Cover, "Space Journey", Martin Faragasso (August 2012)
- Finalist 2013 Chesley Award for Best Magazine Cover, "Breaking Through", Julie Dillon (October 2012)
- Finalist 2014 Chesley Award for Best Magazine Cover, "Elliptic", Julie Dillon (December 2013)
- Finalist 2015 Chesley Award for Best Magazine Cover, "Hollow", Matt Dixon (March 2014)
- Winner 2016 Chesley Award for Best Art Director, Neil Clarke
- Finalist 2016 Chesley Award for Best Magazine Cover, "A-boushi-ya", shichigoro-shingo (October 2015)
- Finalist 2017 Chesley Award for Best Art Director, Neil Clarke
- Winner 2018 Chesley Award for Best Art Director, Neil Clarke
- Finalist 2018 Chesley Award for Best Magazine Cover, "Jungle Deep", Sergei Sarichev (March 2017)
- Finalist 2018 Chesley Award for Best Magazine Cover, "Darkess", Julie Dillon (May 2017)
- Finalist 2018 Chesley Award for Best Magazine Cover, "Genetics Lab", Eddie Mendoza (July 2017)
- Winner 2019 Chesley Award for Best Magazine Cover, "Meeting", Arthur Haas (May 2018)
- Winner 2019 Chesley Award for Best Art Director, Neil Clarke
- Finalist 2019 Chesley Award for Best Magazine Cover, "The Storkfriars", Sean Andrew Murray (June 2018)
- Finalist 2020 Chesley Award for Best Magazine Cover, "Vertigo", Matt Dixon (May 2019)
- Winner 2021 Chesley Award for Best Magazine Cover, "Ancient Stones", Francesca Resta (October 2020)
- Finalist 2021 Chesley Award for Best Art Director, Neil Clarke
- Finalist 2021 Chesley Award for Best Magazine Cover, "51", Rodion Shaldo (September 2020)
- Finalist 2021 Chesley Award for Best Magazine Cover, "Alien Scout", Arjun Amky (November 2020)
- Finalist 2023 Chesley Award for Best Magazine Cover, “Return to Heaven 7”, Zezhou Chen (January 2022)
- Finalist 2023 Chesley Award for Best Magazine Cover, “Art Block”, Daniel Conway (October 2022)
- Finalist 2023 Chesley Award for Best Magazine Cover, “Talk”, JC Jongwon Park (February 2022)
- Winner 2023 Chesley Award for Best Art Director, Neil Clarke

=== Content ===
Award	Category	Year	Nominee	Nominated work	Issue	Result	Ref
Nebula Award	Nebula–Novella	2012	Catherynne M. Valente	"Silently and Very Fast"	#61 (Oct 2011)	Nominated	
Nebula Award	Nebula–Novelette	2013	Catherynne M. Valente	"Fade to White"	#71 (Aug 2012)	Nominated	
Nebula Award	Nebula–Novelette	2015	Tom Crosshill	"The Magician and Laplace's Demon"	#99 (Dec 2014)	Nominated	
Nebula Award	Nebula–Novelette	2018	Vina Jie-Min Prasad	"A Series of Steaks"	#124 (Jan 2017)	Nominated	
Nebula Award	Nebula–Short Story	2010	N. K. Jemisin	"Non-Zero Probabilities"	#36 (Sep 2009)	Nominated	
Nebula Award	Nebula–Short Story	2010	Kij Johnson	"Spar"	#37 (Oct 2009)	Won	
Nebula Award	Nebula–Short Story	2012	E. Lily Yu	"The Cartographer Wasps and the Anarchist Bees"	#55 (Apr 2011)	Nominated	
Nebula Award	Nebula–Short Story	2013	Aliette de Bodard	"Immersion"	#69 (Jun 2012)	Won	
Nebula Award	Nebula–Short Story	2013	Helena Bell	"Robot"	#72 (Sep 2012)	Nominated	
Nebula Award	Nebula–Short Story	2013	Tom Crosshill	"Fragmentation, or Ten Thousand Goodbyes"	#67 (Apr 2012)	Nominated	
Nebula Award	Nebula–Short Story	2015	Matthew Kressel	"The Meeker and the All-Seeing Eye"	#92 (May 2014)	Nominated	
Nebula Award	Nebula–Short Story	2016	Naomi Kritzer	"Cat Pictures Please"	#100 (Jan 2015)	Nominated	
Nebula Award	Nebula–Short Story	2016	Martin L. Shoemaker	"Today I Am Paul"	#107 (Aug 2015)	Nominated	
Nebula Award	Nebula–Short Story	2016	Sam J. Miller	"When Your Child Strays from God"	#106 (Jul 2015)	Nominated	
Nebula Award	Nebula–Short Story	2017	Sam J. Miller	"Things With Beards"	#117 (Jun 2016)	Nominated	
Nebula Award	Nebula–Short Story	2020	A. T. Greenblatt	"Give the Family My Love"	#149 (Feb 2019)	Won	
Nebula Award	Nebula–Short Story	2025	Isabel J. Kim	"Why Don't We Just Kill the Kid In the Omelas Hole"	#209 (Feb 2024)	Won	
Hugo Award	Hugo–Novella	2012	Catherynne M. Valente	"Silently and Very Fast"	#61 (Oct 2011)	Nominated	
Hugo Award	Hugo–Novelette	2013	Catherynne M. Valente	"Fade to White"	#71 (Aug 2012)	Nominated	
Hugo Award	Hugo–Novelette	2017	Carolyn Ives Gilman	"Touring with the Alien"	#115 (Apr 2016)	Nominated	
Hugo Award	Hugo–Novelette	2018	Suzanne Palmer	"The Secret Life of Bots"	#132 (Sep 2017)	Won	
Hugo Award	Hugo–Novelette	2018	Vina Jie-Min Prasad	"A Series of Steaks"	#124 (Jan 2017)	Nominated	
Hugo Award	Hugo–Novelette	2019	Simone Heller	"When We Were Starless"	#145 (Oct 2018)	Nominated	
Hugo Award	Hugo–Novelette	2021	Isabel Fall	"Helicopter Story"	#160 (Jan 2020)	Nominated	
Hugo Award	Hugo–Novelette	2021	Naomi Kritzer	"Monster"	#160 (Jan 2020)	Nominated	
Hugo Award	Hugo–Novelette	2022	Suzanne Palmer	"Bots of the Lost Ark"	#177 (Jun 2021)	Won	
Hugo Award	Hugo–Novelette	2023	S. L. Huang	"Murder by Pixel: Crime and Responsibility in the Digital Darkness"	#195 (Dec 2022)	Nominated	
Hugo Award	Hugo–Novelette	2023	Marie Vibbert	"We Built This City"	#189 (Jun 2022)	Nominated	
Hugo Award	Hugo–Novelette	2023	Gu Shi; Emily Jen (translator)	"Introduction to 2181 Overture, Second Edition"	#197 (Feb 2023)	Nominated	
Hugo Award	Hugo–Short Story	2010	N. K. Jemisin	"Non-Zero Probabilities"	#36 (Sep 2009)	Nominated	
Hugo Award	Hugo–Short Story	2010	Kij Johnson	"Spar"	#37 (Oct 2009)	Nominated	
Hugo Award	Hugo–Short Story	2011	Peter Watts	"The Things"	#40 (Jan 2010)	Nominated	
Hugo Award	Hugo–Short Story	2012	E. Lily Yu	"The Cartographer Wasps and the Anarchist Bees"	#55 (Apr 2011)	Nominated	
Hugo Award	Hugo–Short Story	2013	Aliette de Bodard	"Immersion"	#69 (Jun 2012)	Nominated	
Hugo Award	Hugo–Short Story	2013	Kij Johnson	"Mantis Wives"	#71 (Aug 2012)	Nominated	
Hugo Award	Hugo–Short Story	2016	Naomi Kritzer	"Cat Pictures Please"	#100 (Jan 2015)	Won	
Hugo Award	Hugo–Short Story	2023	Naomi Kritzer	"Better Living Through Algorithms"	#200 (May 2023)	Won	
Hugo Award	Hugo–Short Story	2024	Isabel J. Kim	"Why Don't We Just Kill the Kid In the Omelas Hole"	#209 (Feb 2024)	Nominated	
World Fantasy Award	WFA–Novella	2012	Catherynne M. Valente	"Silently and Very Fast"	#61 (Oct 2011)	Nominated	
World Fantasy Award	WFA–Novella	2019	Kij Johnson	"The Privilege of the Happy Ending"	#143 (Aug 2018)	Won	
World Fantasy Award	WFA–Short Story	2009	Catherynne M. Valente	"A Buyer's Guide to Maps of Antarctica"	#20 (May 2008)	Nominated	
World Fantasy Award	WFA–Short Story	2012	E. Lily Yu	"The Cartographer Wasps and the Anarchist Bees"	#55 (Apr 2011)	Nominated	
World Fantasy Award	WFA–Short Story	2014	Yoon Ha Lee	"Effigy Nights"	#76 (Jan 2013)	Nominated	
Bram Stoker Award	BSA–Short Fiction	2008	Paul G. Tremblay	"There's No Light Between Floors"	#8 (May 2007)	Nominated	
Shirley Jackson Award	SJA–Short Fiction	2008	Carrie Laben	"Something in the Mermaid Way"	#6 (Mar 2007)	Nominated	
Shirley Jackson Award	SJA–Short Fiction	2008	Jeff VanderMeer	"The Third Bear"	#7 (Apr 2007)	Nominated	
Shirley Jackson Award	SJA–Short Fiction	2011	Peter Watts	"The Things"	#40 (Jan 2010)	Won	
Shirley Jackson Award	SJA–Short Fiction	2017	Sam J. Miller	"Things With Beards"	#117 (Jun 2016)	Nominated	
BSFA Award	BSFA–Short Story	2011	Peter Watts	"The Things"	#40 (Jan 2010)	Nominated	
BSFA Award	BSFA–Short Story	2013	Aliette de Bodard	"Immersion"	#69 (Jun 2012)	Nominated	
BSFA Award	BSFA–Short Story	2016	Aliette de Bodard	"Three Cups of Grief, by Starlight"	#100 (Jan 2015)	Won	
BSFA Award	BSFA–Short Story	2019	Nina Allan	"The Gift of Angels: An Introduction"	#146 (Nov 2018)	Nominated	
Aurora Award	Aurora–Novella/Novelette	2020	L. X. Beckett	"The Immolation of Kev Magee"	#167 (Aug 2020)	Nominated	
Aurora Award	Aurora–Novella/Novelette	2020	Rebecca Campbell	"An Important Failure"	#167 (Aug 2020)	Nominated	
Aurora Award	Aurora–Novella/Novelette	2020	A. C. Wise	"To Sail the Black"	#170 (Nov 2020)	Nominated	
Aurora Award	Aurora–Short Fiction	2013	Suzanne Church	"Synch Me, Kiss Me, Drop"	#68 (May 2012)	Nominated	
Eugie		2016	Catherynne Valente	"The Long Goodnight of Violet Wild"	#100 (Jan 2015)	Won	
Eugie		2016	Aliette de Bodard	"Three Cups of Grief, by Starlight"	#100 (Jan 2015)	Nominated	
Eugie		2019	Simone Heller	"When We Were Starless"	#145 (Oct 2018)	Won	
Theodore Sturgeon Award		2010	Kij Johnson	"Spar"	#37 (Oct 2009)	Finalist	
Theodore Sturgeon Award		2011	Peter Watts	"The Things"	#40 (Jan 2010)	3rd	
Theodore Sturgeon Award		2012	Yoon Ha Lee	"Ghostweight"	#52 (Jan 2011)	Finalist	
Theodore Sturgeon Award		2012	Catherynne M. Valente	"Silently and Very Fast"	#61 (Oct 2011)	Finalist	
Theodore Sturgeon Award		2013	Aliette de Bodard	"Immersion"	#69 (Jun 2012)	Finalist	
Theodore Sturgeon Award		2013	Aliette de Bodard	"Scattered Along the River of Heaven"	#64 (Jan 2012)	Finalist	
Theodore Sturgeon Award		2013	E. Catherine Tobler	"(To See the Other) Whole Against the Sky"	#74 (Nov 2012)	Finalist	
Theodore Sturgeon Award		2014	Robert Reed	"Mystic Falls"	#86 (Nov 2013)	Finalist	
Theodore Sturgeon Award		2014	E. Lily Yu	"The Urashima Effect"	#81 (Jun 2013)	Finalist	
Theodore Sturgeon Award		2016	Kelly Robson	"The Three Resurrections of Jessica Churchill"	#101 (Feb 2015)	Finalist	
Theodore Sturgeon Award		2017	Carolyn Ives Gilman	"Touring with the Alien"	#115 (Apr 2016)	2nd	
Theodore Sturgeon Award		2017	Sam J. Miller	"Things With Beards"	#117 (Jun 2016)	3rd	
Theodore Sturgeon Award		2018	Suzanne Palmer	"The Secret Life of Bots"	#132 (Sep 2017)	Finalist	
Theodore Sturgeon Award		2018	Vina Jie-Min Prasad	"A Series of Steaks"	#124 (Jan 2017)	Finalist	
Theodore Sturgeon Award		2018	Kelly Robson	"We Who Live in the Heart"	#128 (May 2017)	Finalist	
Theodore Sturgeon Award		2019	Carolyn Ives Gilman	"Umbernight"	#137 (Feb 2018)	Finalist	
Theodore Sturgeon Award		2019	Simone Heller	"When We Were Starless"	#145 (Oct 2018)	Finalist	
Theodore Sturgeon Award		2020	A. T. Greenblatt	"Give the Family My Love"	#149 (Feb 2019)	Finalist	
Theodore Sturgeon Award		2020	Suzanne Palmer	"The Painter of Trees"	#153 (Jun 2019)	Finalist	
Theodore Sturgeon Award		2021	Rebecca Campbell	"An Important Failure"	#167 (Aug 2020)	Won–1st	
Theodore Sturgeon Award		2021	Sameem Siddiqui	"AirBody"	#163 (Apr 2020)	Finalist	
Theodore Sturgeon Award		2021	Vajra Chandrasekera	"The Translator, at Low Tide"	#164 (May 2020)	Finalist	
Theodore Sturgeon Award		2022	Suzanne Palmer	"Bots of the Lost Ark"	#177 (Jun 2021)	Nominated	
Theodore Sturgeon Award		2022	R. S. A. Garcia	"Philia, Eros, Storge, Agápe, Pragma"	#172 (Jan 2021)	Nominated	
Theodore Sturgeon Award		2022	Ray Nayler	"Sarcophagus"	#175 (Apr 2021)	Nominated	
Locus Awards	Locus–Novella	2012	Catherynne M. Valente	"Silently and Very Fast"	#61 (Oct 2011)	Won–1st	
Locus Awards	Locus–Novella	2019	Carolyn Ives Gilman	"Umbernight"	#137 (Feb 2018)	Nominated–10th	
Locus Awards	Locus–Novelette	2010	Sarah Monette	"White Charles"	#36 (Sep 2009)	Nominated–35th	
Locus Awards	Locus–Novelette	2011	Tobias Buckell	"A Jar of Goodwill"	#44 (May 2010)	Nominated–13th	
Locus Awards	Locus–Novelette	2012	Nnedi Okorafor	"The Book of Phoenix (Excerpted from The Great Book)"	#54 (Mar 2011)	Nominated–9th	
Locus Awards	Locus–Novelette	2012	Yoon Ha Lee	"Ghostweight"	#52 (Jan 2011)	Nominated–27th	
Locus Awards	Locus–Novelette	2013	Carrie Vaughn	"Astrophilia"	#70 (Jul 2012)	Nominated–19th	
Locus Awards	Locus–Novelette	2015	Yoon Ha Lee	"Wine"	#88 (Jan 2014)	Nominated–9th	
Locus Awards	Locus–Novelette	2015	Tom Crosshill	"The Magician and Laplace's Demon"	#99 (Dec 2014)	Nominated–20th	
Locus Awards	Locus–Novelette	2021	JY Neon Yang	"A Stick of Clay, in the Hands of God, is Infinite Potential"	#164 (May 2020)	Nominated–8th	
Locus Awards	Locus–Novelette	2022	Suzanne Palmer	"Bots of the Lost Ark"	#177 (Jun 2021)	Nominated–9th	
Locus Awards	Locus–Short Story	2008	Jeff VanderMeer	"The Third Bear"	#7 (Apr 2007)	Nominated–12th	
Locus Awards	Locus–Short Story	2008	Elizabeth Bear	"Orm the Beautiful"	#4 (Jan 2007)	Nominated–18th	
Locus Awards	Locus–Short Story	2008	Barth Anderson	"Clockmaker's Requiem"	#6 (Mar 2007)	Nominated–39th	
Locus Awards	Locus–Short Story	2009	Catherynne M. Valente	"A Buyer's Guide to Maps of Antarctica"	#20 (May 2008)	Nominated–11th	
Locus Awards	Locus–Short Story	2009	Jay Lake	"The Sky That Wraps the World Round, Past the Blue and into the Black"	#18 (Mar 2008)	Nominated–15th	
Locus Awards	Locus–Short Story	2010	Kij Johnson	"Spar"	#37 (Oct 2009)	Nominated–2nd	
Locus Awards	Locus–Short Story	2010	Catherynne M. Valente	"The Radiant Car Thy Sparrows Drew"	#35 (Aug 2009)	Nominated–11th	
Locus Awards	Locus–Short Story	2011	Peter Watts	"The Things"	#40 (Jan 2010)	Nominated–2nd	
Locus Awards	Locus–Short Story	2011	Catherynne M. Valente	"Thirteen Ways of Looking at Space/Time"	#47 (Aug 2010)	Nominated–3rd	
Locus Awards	Locus–Short Story	2011	Robert Reed	"The Cull"	#48 (Sep 2010)	Nominated–28th	
Locus Awards	Locus–Short Story	2011	Nina Kiriki Hoffman	"Futures in the Memories Market"	#45 (Jun 2010)	Nominated–34th	
Locus Awards	Locus–Short Story	2012	E. Lily Yu	"The Cartographer Wasps and the Anarchist Bees"	#55 (Apr 2011)	Nominated–3rd	
Locus Awards	Locus–Short Story	2012	Ken Liu	"Tying Knots"	#52 (Jan 2011)	Nominated–30th	
Locus Awards	Locus–Short Story	2013	Aliette de Bodard	"Immersion"	#69 (Jun 2012)	Won–1st	
Locus Awards	Locus–Short Story	2013	Kij Johnson	"Mantis Wives"	#71 (Aug 2012)	Nominated–4th	
Locus Awards	Locus–Short Story	2013	Aliette de Bodard	"Scattered Along the River of Heaven"	#64 (Jan 2012)	Nominated–10th	
Locus Awards	Locus–Short Story	2013	Theodora Goss	"England Under the White Witch"	#73 (Oct 2012)	Nominated–24th	
Locus Awards	Locus–Short Story	2013	Xia Jia	"A Hundred Ghosts Parade Tonight"	#65 (Feb 2012)	Nominated–31st	
Locus Awards	Locus–Short Story	2013	Genevieve Valentine	"A Bead of Jasper, Four Small Stones"	#73 (Oct 2012)	Nominated–33rd	
Locus Awards	Locus–Short Story	2014	Yoon Ha Lee	"Effigy Nights"	#76 (Jan 2013)	Nominated–13th	
Locus Awards	Locus–Short Story	2014	James Patrick Kelly	"The Promise of Space"	#84 (Sep 2013)	Nominated–20th	
Locus Awards	Locus–Short Story	2014	James Patrick Kelly	"Soulcatcher"	#80 (May 2013)	Nominated–23rd	
Locus Awards	Locus–Short Story	2015	Michael Swanwick	"Passage of Earth"	#91 (Apr 2014)	Nominated–10th	
Locus Awards	Locus–Short Story	2015	Ken Liu	"The Long Haul..."	#98 (Nov 2014)	Nominated–16th	
Locus Awards	Locus–Short Story	2015	Yoon Ha Lee	"The Contemporary Foxwife"	#94 (Jul 2014)	Nominated–20th	
Locus Awards	Locus–Short Story	2015	Robert Reed	"Pernicious Romance"	#98 (Nov 2014)	Nominated–25th	

- Winner 2006 Million Writers Award for "Urchins, While Swimming" by Catherynne M. Valente (12/2006 Issue)
- Finalist 2007 WSFA Small Press Award, "The Third Bear" by Jeff VanderMeer (04/2007 Issue)
- Finalist 2007 WSFA Small Press Award, "Orm the Beautiful" by Elizabeth Bear (01/2007 Issue)
- Finalist 2010 Parsec Award for Best Speculative Fiction Story (Short Form), "The Things", Peter Watts (01/2010 Issue)

== Current staff ==
- Neil Clarke, publisher, editor-in-chief
- Sean Wallace, editor, October 2006 – present
- Kate Baker, Podcast Director, October 2009 – present, non-fiction editor, January 2013 – present

== Former staff ==
- Gardner Dozois, reprint editor, April 2013 – May 2018
- Jeremy L.C. Jones, interviewer, September 2010 – December 2014
- Jason Heller, non-fiction editor, January 2012 – December 2012
- Cheryl Morgan, non-fiction editor, January 2009 – December 2011
- Nick Mamatas, editor, October 2006 – July 2008
- Ekaterina Sedia, interim non-fiction editor, August 2008 – December 2008

== See also ==
- Fantasy podcast
