= Helena Bell =

American accountant

- Born: October 29, 1981 (age 44); USA
- Occupation: Author
- Writing career
- Genre: speculative fiction
- Website: www.helbell.com

Helena Leigh Bell is an American accountant and author of speculative fiction and poetry, active in the field since 2005. She writes as Helena Bell, with some of her works published under her full name.

== Biography ==
Bell has five graduate degrees, including a Masters in Accounting, a Juris Doctor degree, a Master of Laws, a Master of Fine Arts in Poetry from Southern Illinois University Carbondale and another in Fiction from North Carolina State University. She is a former Scuba instructor and a certified cave diver. She lives in Durham, North Carolina, where she works as a certified public accountant for Robertson CPA Firm, PLLC.

== Literary career ==
Bell attended the 2013 Clarion West Writers Workshop in Seattle. Her work has appeared in various periodicals, including Brain Harvest, Clarkesworld Magazine, Daily Science Fiction, The Dark, Drabblecast, Electric Velocipede, Escape Pod, Fireside Fiction, The Indiana Review, Lightspeed, New Haven Review, Pedestal Magazine, Rattle, Shimmer Magazine, Strange Horizons, Surreal South, and Toasted Cake, and the anthologies Best American Science Fiction and Fantasy 2017, The Best of Shimmer Magazine, UPGRADED: A Cyborg Anthology, and The Year's Best Science Fiction and Fantasy 2017.

== Bibliography ==
=== Short fiction ===
- "Migrating Bears" (2010) (as Helena Leigh Bell)
- "Please Return My Son Who Is in Your Custody" (2011)
- "All the Young Kirks and Their Good Intentions" (2012)
- "Robot" (2012)
- "Early Draft of Talking Points for the Sixth Emergency Broadcast with Editorial Suggestions by the Office's Unpaid Interns Bob and Isabelle" (2012)
- "Bones" (2013)
- "Entropy" (2013)
- "In Light of Recent Events I Have Reconsidered the Wisdom of Your Space Elevator" (2013)
- "Variations on Bluebeard and Dalton's Law Along the Event Horizon" (2013)
- "Sincerely, Your Psychic" (2013)
- "Partial Inventory of Items Removed from Garden District Home, New Orleans, December 2005" (2013)
- "The Aliens Made of Glass" (2013)
- "Burial" (2014)
- "In Which Faster-the-Light Travel Solves All of Our Problems" (2014)
- "The Things They Were Not Allowed to Carry" (2014) (as Helena Leigh Bell)
- "Married" (2014)
- "Lovecraft" (2014)
- "Mouth" (2015)
- "Look Upon My Works, Ye Mighty, and Despair (in Three Months)" (2015)
- "When We Were Giants" (2015)
- "Needle on Bone" (2015)
- "I've Come to Marry the Princess" (2016)
- "Rescuing Napoleon" (2017)
- "Bond Girls" (2018)
- "Radium Girls" (2020)

=== Poetry ===
- "Prince Charming" (2005)
- "Why I Learned to Cave Dive" (2005)
- "Aliens Built Table Mountain" (2006)
- "[Insert Title Indicating That This Is a Poem about Bluebeard the Wife Murderer, Not the Pirate]" (2006)
- "Beauty Sleep" (2006)
- "Elementary Students Explore the Universe" (2006)
- "Bluebeard's Second Wife" (2006)
- "Apple Picking" (2006)
- "Bluebeard's Third Wife" (2006)
- "Dalton's Law" (2008)
- "Cleaning the Quail" (2009)
- "A Face Like an Imperfectly Shaven Tennis Ball" (2010)

=== Nonfiction ===
- "Never Think of Yourself as Less" (2014)

== Awards ==
"Please Return My Son Who is in Your Custody" was a finalist for the Micro Award. "Robot" was nominated for the 2013 Nebula Award for Best Short Story. "When We Were Giants" received an honorable mention for the 2015 James Tiptree, Jr. Award.
