= Jewel Box (E. Lily Yu book) =

Short story collection

Jewel Box is a short story collection by E. Lily Yu. It received considerable positive reviews from the press.
