= Locus Award for Best Artist =

Literary award by the science fiction and fantasy magazine Locus

The Locus Award for Best Artist is one of the annual Locus Awards presented by the science fiction and fantasy magazine Locus. Awards presented in a given year are for works published in the previous calendar year. There were art awards included from the start of the Locus Awards, both for Fan and Professional artists, but the current award did not stabilise until 1974, then as Best Professional Artist.

The Locus Awards have been described as a prestigious prize in science fiction, fantasy and horror literature.

== Winners ==
=== Best Fan Artist ===
Award winners
| Year | Artist | Ref. |
|---|---|---|
| 1971 | Alicia Austin | |
| 1972 | Bill Rotsler | |
| 1973 | Bill Rotsler | |
| 1974 | Tim Kirk | |
| 1975 | Tim Kirk | |

There was also a Best Fan Cartoonist award made to Bill Rotsler in 1971.

=== Best Professional Artist ===
Award winners
| Year | Award Name | Artist | Ref. |
|---|---|---|---|
| 1971 | Paperback Cover Illustrator | Leo and Diane Dillon | |
| 1972 | Paperback Artist | Gene Szafran | |
| 1972 | Magazine Artist | Frank Kelly Freas | |
| 1973 | Paperback Cover Artist | Frank Kelly Freas | |
| 1973 | Magazine Artist | Frank Kelly Freas | |
| 1974 | Professional Artist | Frank Kelly Freas | |
| 1975 | | Frank Kelly Freas | |
| 1976 | | Frank Kelly Freas | |
| 1976 | | Rick Sternbach | |
| 1977 | | Rick Sternbach | |
| 1978 | No Award Made | | |
| 1979 | | Boris Vallejo | |
| 1980 | | Michael Whelan | |
| 1981 | | Michael Whelan | |
| 1982 | Artist | Michael Whelan | |
| 1983 | | Michael Whelan | |
| 1984 | | Michael Whelan | |
| 1985 | | Michael Whelan | |
| 1986 | | Michael Whelan | |
| 1987 | | Michael Whelan | |
| 1988 | | Michael Whelan | |
| 1989 | | Michael Whelan | |
| 1990 | | Michael Whelan | |
| 1991 | | Michael Whelan | |
| 1992 | | Michael Whelan | |
| 1993 | | Michael Whelan | |
| 1994 | | Michael Whelan | |
| 1995 | | Michael Whelan | |
| 1996 | | Michael Whelan | |
| 1997 | | Michael Whelan | |
| 1998 | | Michael Whelan | |
| 1999 | | Michael Whelan | |
| 2000 | | Michael Whelan | |
| 2001 | | Bob Eggleton | |
| 2002 | | Michael Whelan | |
| 2003 | | Bob Eggleton | |
| 2004 | | Michael Whelan | |
| 2005 | | Michael Whelan | |
| 2006 | | Michael Whelan | |
| 2007 | | John Picacio | |
| 2008 | | Charles Vess | |
| 2009 | | Michael Whelan | |
| 2010 | | Michael Whelan | |
| 2011 | | Shaun Tan | |
| 2012 | | Shaun Tan | |
| 2013 | | Michael Whelan | |
| 2014 | | Michael Whelan | |
| 2015 | | John Picacio | |
| 2016 | | Michael Whelan | |
| 2017 | | Julie Dillon | |
| 2018 | | Julie Dillon | |
| 2019 | | Charles Vess | |
| 2020 | | John Picacio | |
| 2021 | | John Picacio | |
| 2022 | | Charles Vess | |
| 2023 | | Charles Vess | |
| 2024 | | John Picacio | |
| 2025 | | Charles Vess | |
| 2026 | | John Picacio | |

== See also ==
- Locus Award
