= Sean Wallace =

American publisher

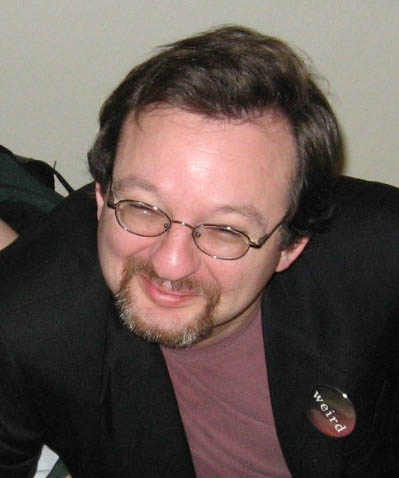
Sean Wallace at the 2007 World Fantasy Convention

Sean Wallace (born January 1, 1976) is an American science fiction, fantasy, and horror anthologist, editor, and publisher best known for founding the publishing house Prime Books and for co-editing three magazines, Clarkesworld Magazine, The Dark Magazine, and Fantasy Magazine. He has been nominated a number of times by both the Hugo Awards and the World Fantasy Awards, won three Hugo Awards and two World Fantasy Awards, and has served as a World Fantasy Award judge.

== Career ==
Wallace began publishing fiction in 1997, when he launched Cosmos Books, with Philip J. Harbottle, and released Fantasy Annual, a paperback magazine of British authors including E.C. Tubb, John Russell Fearn, and Sydney Bounds. In 1999, the Cosmos Books name was licensed to Wildside Press and output greatly increased, expanding with American and Australian authors. He also became a freelance editor for Wildside Press, working from Ohio.

In mid-2001, Wallace stepped in to assist an ailing company, Imaginary Worlds, though it soon went into bankruptcy. Wallace then launched Prime Books to publish a few of the orphaned books, including the award-winning City of Saints and Madmen, by Jeff VanderMeer. Later, in 2003, he licensed the company to Wildside Press, and moved from Ohio to Pennsylvania, as a full-time senior editor. In early 2009, Wallace reacquired Prime Books, and relaunched it as an independent publishing house in May that year. Wallace was twice-nominated for a World Fantasy Award in 2003 and 2004 for editing Prime Books, in the Special Award: Non-Professional and Special Award: Professional categories.

Around this time, he felt that there was a lack of short fiction available in the literary fantasy genre and to cater to this, he launched Fantasy Magazine in 2005, at the World Fantasy Convention in Wisconsin. During 2006 his first nationally distributed book, Horror: The Best of the Year was released, and he took on a co-editing job with Nick Mamatas, with Clarkesworld Magazine. That same year, he won the World Fantasy Award in the Special Award: Professional category for editing Prime Books. In 2009, his work for Clarkesworld gained recognition with Hugo Award and World Fantasy Award nominations. In 2010 and 2011, those efforts were rewarded with back-to-back Hugo Awards. Wallace and the rest of the Clarkesworld team also received World Fantasy Award nominations in 2010, 2012, and 2014. In 2011 he served as a World Fantasy Awards judge and in the same year he launched the World SF Travel Fund with Lavie Tidhar. In 2013 Clarkesworld Magazine and its staff won the Hugo Award a third time, and in 2014 the magazine won its first World Fantasy Award.

Other genre/nongenre efforts Wallace has been involved with include the relaunch and management of WSFA Press; co-founding the Shirley Jackson Awards; managing the SFWA Book Depot at the Nebula Awards conference; and co-administrating the ELFF (Elementary Librarian Family and Friends) facebook group.

He lives in Germantown, Maryland with his wife, Jennifer, and their two children, Cordelia and Nathan.

== Prime Books ==
Prime Books
- Founded: 2001
- Founder: Sean Wallace
- Country of origin: United States
- Headquarters location: Gaithersburg, Maryland
- Distribution: Diamond Book Distributors
- Key people: Sean Wallace; Paula Guran; Neil Clarke; Sherin Nicole
- Publication types: Books
- Fiction genres: Science fiction, fantasy
- Official website: www.prime-books.com

Prime Books, founded by Wallace in 2001, is an American independent publishing house. It publishes in a mix of literary and commercial anthologies, collections, novels, and previously published two magazines: Fantasy Magazine and Lightspeed Magazine (both sold November 2011).

Its authors and editors include:

- John Joseph Adams
- KJ Bishop
- Philip K. Dick
- Theodora Goss
- Rich Horton
- Nick Mamatas
- Sarah Monette
- Richard Parks
- Holly Phillips
- Tim Pratt
- Ekaterina Sedia
- Catherynne M. Valente
- Jeff VanderMeer

== Works ==
=== The Mammoth Book series ===
- The Mammoth Book of Steampunk (2012)
- The Mammoth Book of Steampunk Adventures (2014)
- The Mammoth Book of Warriors and Wizardry (2014)
- The Mammoth Book of Dieselpunk (2015)
- The Mammoth Book of Kaiju (2016)

=== The Realms/Clarkesworld series ===
- Realms: The First Year of Clarkesworld Magazine (2008), with Neil Clarke and Nick Mamatas
- Realms: The Second Year of Clarkesworld Magazine (2010), with Neil Clarke and Nick Mamatas
- Clarkesworld: Year Three (2013), with Neil Clarke and Nick Mamatas
- Clarkesworld: Year Four (2013), with Neil Clarke
- Clarkesworld: Year Five (2013), with Neil Clarke
- Clarkesworld: Year Six (2014), with Neil Clarke
- Clarkesworld: Year Seven (2015), with Neil Clarke
- Clarkesworld: Year Eight (2016), with Neil Clarke
- Clarkesworld: Year Nine, Volume One (2018), with Neil Clarke
- Clarkesworld: Year Nine, Volume Two (2018), with Neil Clarke
- Clarkesworld: Year Ten, Volume One (2019), with Neil Clarke
- Clarkesworld: Year Ten, Volume Two (2019), with Neil Clarke
- Clarkesworld: Year Eleven, Volume One (2019), with Neil Clarke
- Clarkesworld: Year Eleven, Volume Two (2019), with Neil Clarke
- Clarkesworld: Year Twelve, Volume One (2021), with Neil Clarke
- Clarkesworld: Year Twelve, Volume Two (2021), with Neil Clarke

=== Other anthologies ===
- Bandersnatch (2007), with Paul Tremblay
- Best New Fantasy (2006)
- Fantasy (2007), with Paul Tremblay
- Fantasy Annual 3 (1999), with Philip J. Harbottle
- Fantasy Annual 4 (2000), with Philip J. Harbottle
- Fantasy Annual 5 (2003), with Philip J. Harbottle
- Horror: The Best of the Year (2006), with John Betancourt
- Japanese Dreams (2009)
- People of the Book: A Decade of Jewish Science Fiction and Fantasy (2011), with Rachel Swirsky
- Phantom (2009), with Paul Tremblay
- Robots: Recent A.I. (2012), with Rich Horton
- Strange Pleasures (2006)
- War & Space: Recent Combat (2012), with Rich Horton
- Weird Tales: The Twenty-First Century (2007), with Stephen H. Segal

=== Other works ===
- Eric Frank Russell: Our Sentinel in Space : A Working Bibliography: 3rd Revised Edition (1999), with Phil Stephensen-Payne
- The Tall Adventurer: The Works of E.C. Tubb (1997), with Philip J. Harbottle
- The SFWA Bulletin Index, 1965-2017 (2018), with Michael Capobianco and Erin M. Hartshorn
- The Graphic Novels / Manga / Comic Strips / Comics Master List, Grades K through 5 (2019-), with Jennifer Wallace

=== Magazines edited ===
- Il Buio (Italian edition of The Dark), with Silvia Moreno-Garcia and Lorenzo Crescentini (September 2018 – 2019); 7 issues, along with an omnibus, Il Buio, Anno 1 (2019)
- Clarkesworld Magazine, with Nick Mamatas (October 2006-July 2008); with Neil Clarke (August 2008-current); 220 issues
- The Dark Magazine, with Jack Fisher (October 2013-April 2016), 11 issues; solely (May 2016-December 2016), 8 issues; with Silvia Moreno-Garcia (January 2017-December 2020), 48 issues; solely (January 2021-June 2022), 18 issues; with Clara Madrigano, (July 2022-June 2023), 12 issues; solely (July 2022-January 2025): total: 116 issues
- Fantasy Magazine (2005); with Paul Tremblay (2006-2007); with Cat Rambo (2007-2011); 47 issues
- Podcastle (November 2009), guest editor; 1 issue
- Thaumatrope (August 2009), guest editor; 1 issue
- Underworlds: The Magazine of Noir and Dark Suspense (2004); 1 issue

=== Journals edited ===
- Fantasy Annual, with Philip J. Harbottle (1997-1998), 2 volumes
- Jabberwocky (2006-2007), 3 issues; with Erzebet YellowBoy (2009-2011), 6 issues

== Essays and articles ==
- "Publishing in the Future: The Potential and Reality of POD" in Locus, March 10, 2004
