= Gene Szafran =

American artist, illustrator, and sculptor

- Born: April 11, 1941; Hamtramck, Michigan, U.S.
- Died: 8 January 2011 (aged 69)
- Education: College for Creative Studies; Society of Arts
- Style: Sculpting; Illustrating
- Spouse: Marilyn Despre

Gene Szafran (11 April 1941 – 8 January 2011) was an American artist, illustrator, and sculptor. He was known for illustrations in magazines including Playboy and Fortune and cover art for science fiction books published by Bantam and Ballantine during the 1960s to 1980s, including a series of Signet paperbacks of Robert A. Heinlein's work.

Born in Hamtramck, Michigan, Szafran studied at the College for Creative Studies and Society of Arts and Crafts in Detroit, where he later taught, and was also an art instructor at the Pratt Institute in Brooklyn, New York. He and his wife Marilyn Despres moved from New York to Redding, Connecticut in the 1970s. They had a daughter named Alyssa. During this time he contracted multiple sclerosis which devastated him, severely affecting his mobility and cutting short his career as an illustrator. Szafran then returned to the Detroit area.

Szafran won the 1972 Locus Award for Best Paperback Artist.

== Sources ==
- Szafran represented by the LeChateau Gallery
- Examples of Szafran's art.
