= Potlatch (convention) =

Potlatch was an annual "small, literary speculative fiction convention", organized as a non-profit and held in the Pacific Northwest region of North America from 1992 until 2016. Unlike most SF conventions, Potlatch designated a "Book of Honor" rather than author, editor, fan, and/or artist "Guests of Honor;" although the appellation "Book of Honor" did not preclude works from other media receiving the honor, such as films, most honorees were books.

== Books of Honor ==
- Potlatch 1, 1992 : None
- Potlatch 2, 1993 : Frankenstein by Mary Shelley
- Potlatch 3, 1994 : None
- Potlatch 4, 1995 : The Only Neat Thing to Do by James Tiptree, Jr.
- Potlatch 5, 1996 : The Lathe of Heaven (video, based on the novel by Ursula K. Le Guin)
- Potlatch 6, 1997 : None
- Potlatch 7, 1998 : The War of the Worlds by H. G. Wells
- Potlatch 8, 1999 : None
- Potlatch 9, 2000 : None (also described as "Corflatch" due to being held in conjunction with Corflu 17).
- Potlatch 10, 2001 : Thunder and Roses by Theodore Sturgeon
- Potlatch 11, 2002 : None
- Potlatch 12, 2003 : The Rediscovery of Man by Cordwainer Smith
- Potlatch 13, 2004 : The Shockwave Rider by John Brunner
- Potlatch 14, 2005 : A Scanner Darkly by Philip K. Dick
- Potlatch 15, 2006 : The Avram Davidson Treasury edited by Robert Silverberg and Grania Davis
- Potlatch 16, 2007 : Dimensions of Sheckley: The Selected Novels by Robert Sheckley
- Potlatch 17, 2008 : Parable of the Sower by Octavia E. Butler
- Potlatch 18, 2009 : Always Coming Home by Ursula K. Le Guin and Growing Up Weightless by John M. Ford
- Potlatch 19, 2010 : Lord of Light by Roger Zelazny
- Potlatch 20, 2011 : Earth Abides by George R. Stewart
- Potlatch 21, 2012 : A Canticle for Leibowitz by Walter M. Miller, Jr.
- Potlatch 22, 2013 : Among Others by Jo Walton
- Potlatch 23, 2014 : The City & the City by China Miéville
- Potlatch 24, 2015 : Women Destroy Science Fiction! June 2014 special issue of Lightspeed Magazine
- Potlatch 25, 2016 : Constellation Games by Leonard Richardson
