= The Strange Case of the Alchemist's Daughter =

2017 novel by Theodora Goss

- Author: Theodora Goss
- Language: English
- Series: The Extraordinary Adventures of the Athena Club
- Genre: Horror, gothic, mystery, fantasy, historical fiction
- Published: 2017
- Publisher: Simon & Schuster
- Publication place: United States
- ISBN: 978-1-4814-6651-6
- Followed by: European Travel for the Monstrous Gentlewoman

The Strange Case of the Alchemist's Daughter is the 2017 debut novel by Theodora Goss. It is the first instalment of The Extraordinary Adventures of the Athena Club series.

Drawing on classic gothic and horror creations of the 19th century, such as Strange Case of Dr. Jekyll & Mr. Hyde, Frankenstein, "Rappaccini's Daughter", The Island of Doctor Moreau, Dracula and the Sherlock Holmes stories, Goss reimagines the works of such literary greats as Mary Shelley, Robert Louis Stevenson, H. G. Wells, Bram Stoker and Nathaniel Hawthorne from a feminist perspective, as well as the historical record of the Jack the Ripper murders.

The story follows Mary Jekyll, daughter of the literary character Dr. Jekyll, as she meets and connects with the fictional daughters of major literary characters, and works with and faces various famous 19th century literary personae, including Sherlock Holmes and Dr. Watson, Frankenstein's monster, and others to solve the mystery of a series of killings in London, as well as the mystery of her own family story. At the center of the narrative is the connection and various experiences of the women who form the Athena Club, the oppressions they experience, and how they empower each other to accomplish great things.

The Strange Case of the Alchemist's Daughter won the Locus Award for Best First Novel and was nominated for the Nebula Award for Best Novel.

== Synopsis ==
Mary Jekyll is alone and quickly running out of money following her mother's death. As clues arise to indicate that Edward Hyde, her father's former friend and a murderer, may be nearby, Mary becomes curious about the secrets of her father's past. As she discovers that a reward is on offer for information leading to Hyde's capture, she realizes that investigating the mysteries of her family could solve all of her financial woes.

Following the trail of money sent by her mother to a religious order, the hunt soon leads her to Diana, Hyde's daughter. Diana is a feral child who was left to be raised by nuns. Diana informs Mary that they are actually half sisters, a truth Mary finds difficult to accept. Mary's investigation crosses that of Scotland Yard, who are investigating a series of murders of women in the area, and becomes acquainted with Sherlock Holmes. Holmes and Dr. Watson help Mary in her continued search for Hyde. In the process, Mary discovers and befriends other "monstrous" daughters of infamous scientists, all of whom have been created through terrifying experimentation: Beatrice Rappaccini, Catherine Moreau, and Justine Frankenstein.

When their investigations lead them to the discovery of The Alchemists Society, a secret organization of scientists, the horrors of their past return.

== Reception ==
Publishers Weekly, in a starred review, called The Strange Case of the Alchemist's Daughter a "tour de force of reclaiming the narrative, executed with impressive wit and insight", crediting Goss with "easily surmount[ing] the challenge of making such a male-defined premise belong to the women as shapers of their own destinies."

In his NPR review, Jason Heller writes: "Strange Case is a swiftly paced, immaculately plotted mystery full of winning characters you always thought you knew, as well as ones you would never have imagined. Even when she brings up weightier subjects — feminism, gender fluidity, the onset of modernity in the predawn of the 20th century — she handles them with wit and sensitivity."

Kirkus Reviews was less than enthusiastic, opining that because of "overreliance on the referenced novels, a distracting literary device in which characters comment on each other’s stories, and allusions to a wider mystery, there is no room for the characters to have the independent characterizations they so richly deserve" and that "despite a potential-laden premise that stands out from the many character-mashup stories on the market, this collection of parts fails to come alive".

== Themes ==
Leah Schnelbach of Tor.com calls Strange Case "a feminist retelling of Victoriana", as well as an "examination of class, mobility, propriety, and finances, and how they echo through women’s lives, and constrain them."

Goss first approached the question "Why did so many of the mad scientists in 19th century narratives create, or start creating but then destroy, female monsters?" in her PhD, then exploring it in her short story "The Mad Scientist’s Daughter", originally published in Strange Horizons in 2010.

Goss focuses on the brutal treatment that created these female monsters, questioning why women were frequently the targets of these scientists. In all cases, Goss presents characters who were transformed as a means to propagate changes into humanity, mothers who could pass down abilities to a new generation that would inherit a rapidly changing world. Goss’ women aren't willing to play ball, and unlike their often solitary creators (who occupy labs, remote islands, and castles), they work together to take control of their own destinies, and stop the brutal murders.

== Characters ==
Each of the women characters represents an aspect of how women are viewed under patriarchy. Goss has the women's characters "interject" during the telling of the story, which the reader learns is being transcribed by one of the women, Catherine Moreau.

- Mary Jekyll: An English gentlewoman, newly impoverished, daughter of the late, esteemed scientist Dr. Henry Jekyll. Mary is determined to investigate her father's legacy, including the relationship between him and Mr. Hyde, and how her mother fits into the story. She is the logical and organized member of the group, and becomes an assistant to Sherlock Holmes in his work. Mary is the one who brings together all the other "monstrous" women who form the Athena Club and begin to see each other as family.
- Diana Hyde: Half sister to Mary, daughter to Mr. Hyde, Dr. Jekyll's alter ego. Diana is wild, tending to the criminal, and absolute in her refusal to adhere to social convention or to accept authority. She was left to be raised by nuns, an endeavor secretly paid for by Mary's mother.
- Beatrice Rappaccini: Daughter of Dr. Giacomo Rappaccini. As described in the story "Rappaccini's Daughter", she was raised in her father's poison garden, and became immune to the poison, but in turn became poisonous herself.
- Catherine Moreau: Doctor Moreau's greatest creation, a human developed from a puma. Referred to as a "catwoman", Moreau largely resembles a normal human woman but retains her feline eyes and sharp teeth due to Moreau never finishing her.
- Justine Frankenstein: A creation of Dr. Frankenstein, meant to be the mate of his original creature. Justine, held as an unwilling captive by Frankenstein's "Adam", manages to escape and joins up eventually with Catherine Moreau.
- Mrs. Poole: Housekeeper to the Jekyll family, remains as caretaker to Mary and the women she "collects" even when Mary is financially challenged to maintain the household.
- Sherlock Holmes: The famous detective becomes acquainted with Mary Jekyll when his investigation into the Whitechapel murders (referencing Jack the Ripper, not included in the story) crosses her investigation into the Alchemists Society.
- Dr. Watson: Gentlemanly sidekick to Holmes, helps Mary and the other women both as a medical professional and by accompanying them in their pursuit of the truth.
- Edward Hyde: Criminal alter-ego of Dr. Henry Jekyll.
- Adam: Frankenstein's monster. Is obsessed with Justine, and determined that she be his mate, even against her will.

== Awards ==
- Locus Award for Best First Novel (2018)
- Audie Award (2018)
- Lariat Award (2018
- Nominated for the Nebula Award for Best Novel (2017)
- Nominated for the Compton Crook Award for Best First Novel (2018)
- Nominated for the World Fantasy Award for Best Novel (2018)

== Adaptations ==
In November 2018, it was announced that Strange Case was being developed into a series for The CW network, with an adapted screenplay by A. J. Marechal. This would be the first such adaptation of Goss' work.
