= Neil Clarke (editor) =

American editor & publisher (born 1966)

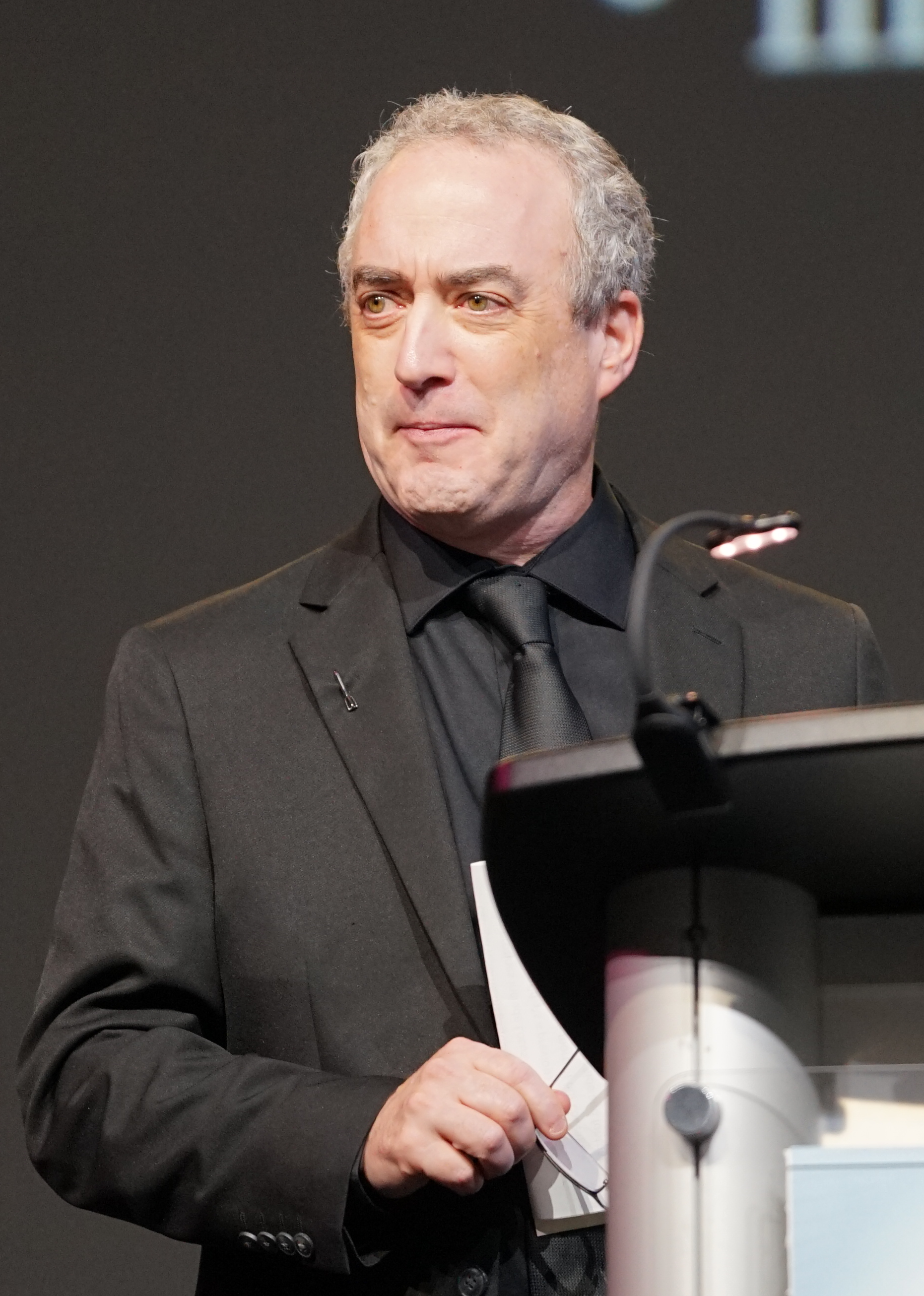
- Clarke at Hugo Award 2026
- Born: 1966 (age 59–60); New Jersey
- Occupations: Editor, publisher
- Writing career
- Genres: Science fiction, Fantasy
- Subjects: Science fiction, fantasy
- Website: neil-clarke.com

Neil Clarke (born 1966) is an American editor and publisher, best known as the founder and editor-in-chief of Clarkesworld Magazine.

In 2006, Clarke launched Clarkesworld Magazine as a companion to his online bookstore Clarkesworld Books (2000-2007). He serves as the editor-in-chief of the digital publication. Fiction published in Clarkesworld has been nominated for or won the Hugo, Nebula, World Fantasy, Sturgeon, Locus, Ditmar, Aurealis, Shirley Jackson, WSFA Small Press and Stoker Awards. Clarkesworld has been a finalist for the Hugo Award in the Best Semiprozine category four times (2009, 2010, 2011, 2013) winning in 2010, 2011 and 2013. Clarke has been a finalist for the Hugo Award for Best Editor: Short Form in 2012, 2013, 2014, 2016, 2017, 2018, 2019, 2020, 2021, 2022, 2023, 2024, and 2025. He received the Kate Wilhelm Solstice Award from Science Fiction and Fantasy Writers of America in May 2019 and won the Locus Award for Best Editor in 2024.

When Clarke closed his bookstore in 2007, he launched Wyrm Publishing, which has since published books by Gene Wolfe, Charles Stross, Catherynne M. Valente and others. Clarkesworld Magazine is currently published by Wyrm in online, digital, audio and print editions. He launched Forever Magazine in 2015 and became the editor of The SFWA Bulletin in early 2016. He edits The Best Science Fiction of the Year series for Night Shade Books. He is also the ebook designer for Cheeky Frawg Books, Prime Books, Wyrm Publishing and several magazines.

As of 2022, Clarke and his family reside in New Jersey.

== Health ==
In 2012, Clarke suffered a severe heart attack while attending Readercon, and had a defibrillator implanted. He has credited this event with having led him to become a full-time editor.

== Bibliography ==
=== Magazines (edited) ===
- Clarkesworld Magazine, 2006 -
- Forever Magazine, 2015 -
- The SFWA Bulletin, Science Fiction and Fantasy Writers of America, 2016 - 2019
- Berlin Quarterly Issue 4, special guest fiction editor
- Internazionale (Guest Editor, Storie Issue), Issue 1338, December 2019

=== Anthologies (edited) ===
- Clarkesworld: Year Three, (with Sean Wallace), Wyrm Publishing, 2013
- Clarkesworld: Year Four, (with Sean Wallace), Wyrm Publishing, 2013
- Clarkesworld: Year Five, (with Sean Wallace), Wyrm Publishing, 2013
- Clarkesworld: Year Six, (with Sean Wallace), Wyrm Publishing, 2014
- Upgraded. Wyrm. 2014.
- Clarkesworld: Year Seven, (with Sean Wallace), Wyrm Publishing, 2015
- Clarkesworld: Year Eight, (with Sean Wallace), Wyrm Publishing, 2016
- The Best Science Fiction of the Year Volume 1, Night Shade Books, 2016
- Galactic Empires, Night Shade Books, 2017
- Touchable Unreality, China Machine Press, 2017
- The Best Science Fiction of the Year Volume 2, Night Shade Books, 2017
- More Human Than Human, Night Shade Books, 2017
- The Best Science Fiction of the Year Volume 3, Night Shade Books, 2018
- Clarkesworld: Year Nine, Volume One, (with Sean Wallace), Wyrm Publishing, 2018
- Clarkesworld: Year Nine, Volume Two, (with Sean Wallace), Wyrm Publishing, 2018
- The Final Frontier, Night Shade Books, 2018
- Not One of Us, Night Shade Books, 2018
- The Eagle has Landed, Night Shade Books, 2019
- The Best Science Fiction of the Year Volume 4, Night Shade Books, 2019
- Clarkesworld: Year Ten, Volume One, (with Sean Wallace), Wyrm Publishing, 2019
- Clarkesworld: Year Ten, Volume Two, (with Sean Wallace), Wyrm Publishing, 2019
- Clarkesworld: Year Eleven, Volume One, (with Sean Wallace), Wyrm Publishing, 2019
- Clarkesworld: Year Eleven, Volume Two, (with Sean Wallace), Wyrm Publishing, 2019
- The Best Science Fiction of the Year Volume 5, Night Shade Books, 2020
- Clarkesworld: Year Twelve, Volume One, (with Sean Wallace), Wyrm Publishing, 2021
- Clarkesworld: Year Twelve, Volume Two, (with Sean Wallace), Wyrm Publishing, 2021
- The Best Science Fiction of the Year Volume 6, Night Shade Books, 2022
- New Voices in Chinese Science Fiction, (with Xia Jia and Regina Kanyu Wang), Clarkesworld Books, 2022
- The Best Science Fiction of the Year Volume 7, Night Shade Books, 2023
- The Best Science Fiction of the Year Volume 8, Night Shade Books, 2024
- Clarkesworld: Year Thirteen, Volume One, (with Sean Wallace), Wyrm Publishing, 2024
- Clarkesworld: Year Thirteen, Volume Two, (with Sean Wallace), Wyrm Publishing, 2024

=== Critical studies and reviews of Clarke's work ===
Upgraded

- Sakers, Don (May 2015). "The Reference Library". Analog Science Fiction and Fact. 135 (5): 104–107.

== Awards ==
- Nominee, World Fantasy Special Award: Non-Professional, 2009, 2010, 2012
- Winner, World Fantasy Special Award: Non-Professional, 2014
- Finalist, Hugo Award for Best Semiprozine, 2009
- Winner, Hugo Award for Best Semiprozine, 2010, 2011, 2013
- Finalist, Hugo Award for Best Editor Short Form, 2012, 2013, 2014, 2016, 2017, 2018, 2019, 2020, 2021
- Winner, Hugo Award for Best Editor Short Form, 2022, 2023, 2024, 2025, 2026
- Winner, Locus Award for Best Editor, 2024, 2025, 2026
- Nominee, Chesley Award for Best Art Director, 2017, 2021
- Winner, Chesley Award for Best Art Director, 2016, 2018, 2019, 2023
- Recipient, The Kate Wilhelm Solstice Award, 2019
