= Julie Dillon =

American artist (born 1982)

Julie Dillon (born 1982) is an American artist specializing in science fiction and fantasy art. A freelance illustrator, Dillon has created images for games, book and magazine covers, and covers for musical albums. Dillon's work has been nominated for the Chesley Award five times; she won the 2010 Chesley Award for Best Unpublished Color for "Planetary Alignment" (subsequently published as a cover for Clarkesworld Magazine), as well as the 2011 Chesley Award for "The Dala Horse" in Best Interior Illustration. She was nominated for the World Fantasy Award for Best Artist in 2012 and received the Hugo Award for Best Professional Artist in 2014, 2015, and 2017. She also received two Chesley Awards in 2015 for the Best Cover Illustrations for a magazine and a hardback book. Dillon lives and works in California.

== Biography ==
Dillon received a BFA in Fine Arts from Sacramento State University in 2005, with continued education at the Academy of Arts University in San Francisco and Watts Atelier.

In a 2009 interview, Dillon highlighted Alphonse Mucha, Jon Foster, John William Waterhouse and Andrew Jones as artists who have influenced her work.

Dillon produced art for the Llewellyn Worldwide Astrology 2014 calendar.

In 2014 Dillon successfully ran a Kickstarter campaign to fund self-publication of a fantasy art collection titled Imagined Realms: Book 1. In 2015 Dillon successfully ran a kickstarter campaign to fund self-publication of a second collection with a science fiction theme, titled Imagined Realms: Book 2.

=== Awards and nominations ===
Year	Award	Category	Recipient(s)	Result	Ref.
2010	Chesley Awards	Unpublished Color	"Planetary Alignment"	Won	
2010	Chesley Awards	Best Magazine Art	"Honeycomb"	Nominated	
2010	InterGalactic Medicine Show	Best Cover Illustration	"The Never Never Wizard of Apalachicola"	Won	
2012	Chesley Awards	Best Interior Illustration	"The Dala Horse"	Won	
2012	World Fantasy Award	Best Artist	Julie Dillon	Nominated	
2013	Hugo Award	Best Professional Artist	Julie Dillon	Nominated	
2014	Hugo Award	Best Professional Artist	Julie Dillon	Won	
2015	Hugo Award	Best Professional Artist	Julie Dillon	Won	
2015	Chesley Awards	Best Cover Illustration - Magazine	"Analog"	Won	
2015	Chesley Awards	Best Cover Illustration - Hardback Book	"Shadows Beneath: The Writing Excuses Anthology"	Won	
2017	World Fantasy Award	Best Artist	Julie Dillon	Nominated	
2017	Locus Awards	Locus Award for Best Artist	Julie Dillon	Won	
2018	Locus Awards	Locus Award for Best Artist	Julie Dillon	Won	

- Winner of Best Color Work, Best Artist, and Best in Show at ArmadilloCon Art Show
- Included in Spectrum 17, Spectrum 18, and Spectrum 19
- "Artificial Dreams" featured as the cover art for Corel Painter 12’s 20th Anniversary

== Bibliography ==
=== Notable covers ===
- "Snow, Glass, Apples" by Neil Gaiman (Black Phoenix Alchemy Lab chapter book)
- Crossed Genres, Issue 12 (Nov 2009)
- "Honeycomb", Clarkesworld Magazine (September 2010)
- "The Never Never Wizard of Apalachicola", by Jason Sanford - used in Issue 20 of InterGalactic Medicine Show (Dec 2010), as well as on the cover of InterGalactic Awards Anthology, Volume I, both edited by Edmund R. Schubert and Orson Scott Card
- "Nautili", Clarkesworld Magazine (February 2011)
- "Gold Sea", Lightspeed Magazine (May 2011)
- "Under the Surface", by Nina Kiriki Hoffman - Issue 25, InterGalactic Medicine Show (Nov 2011)
- "Planetary Alignment", Clarkesworld Magazine (November 2011)
- "Breaking Through", Clarkesworld Magazine (October 2012)
- Luck of the Draw, by Piers Anthony (December 2012)
- The Dark is Rising, by Susan Cooper (June 2013)
- Long Hidden: Speculative Fiction from the Margins of History, edited by Rose Fox and Daniel José Older (January 2014)
- Stranger Things: Kamchatka issue #3, by Michael Moreci and Todor Hristov, variant cover (Dark Horse Comics, May 2022)
