= Orion's Child Science Fiction & Fantasy Magazine =

First issue cover

Orion's Child Science Fiction & Fantasy Magazine was a fantasy and science fiction magazine first published in 1984 by Orion Press under the editorship of T. Joseph Cole. The magazine featured original fiction, art, and poetry. Though it included works by such prominent authors as Ray Bradbury and Richard L. Tierney, the original magazine produced only two issues. Recently, Orion's Child has been resurrected by the son, Gabriel M. Cole, of the original founder and editor, himself an aspiring writer.

The new incarnation, this "second volume" of Orion's Child, is an e-zine and is not published in paper format. The first issue appeared in May 2007, with subsequent issues appearing monthly. The second volume adheres to a similar format as the original paper magazine, including original art, poetry and fiction, but eschewing in-page navigation, blogs, or other web enhancements to hold true to the style of a paper magazine.

== Editors-in-chief ==
- T. Joseph Cole, 1984
- Gabriel M. Cole, 2007–present
