= Tom Crosshill =

Latvian author

Toms Kreicbergs
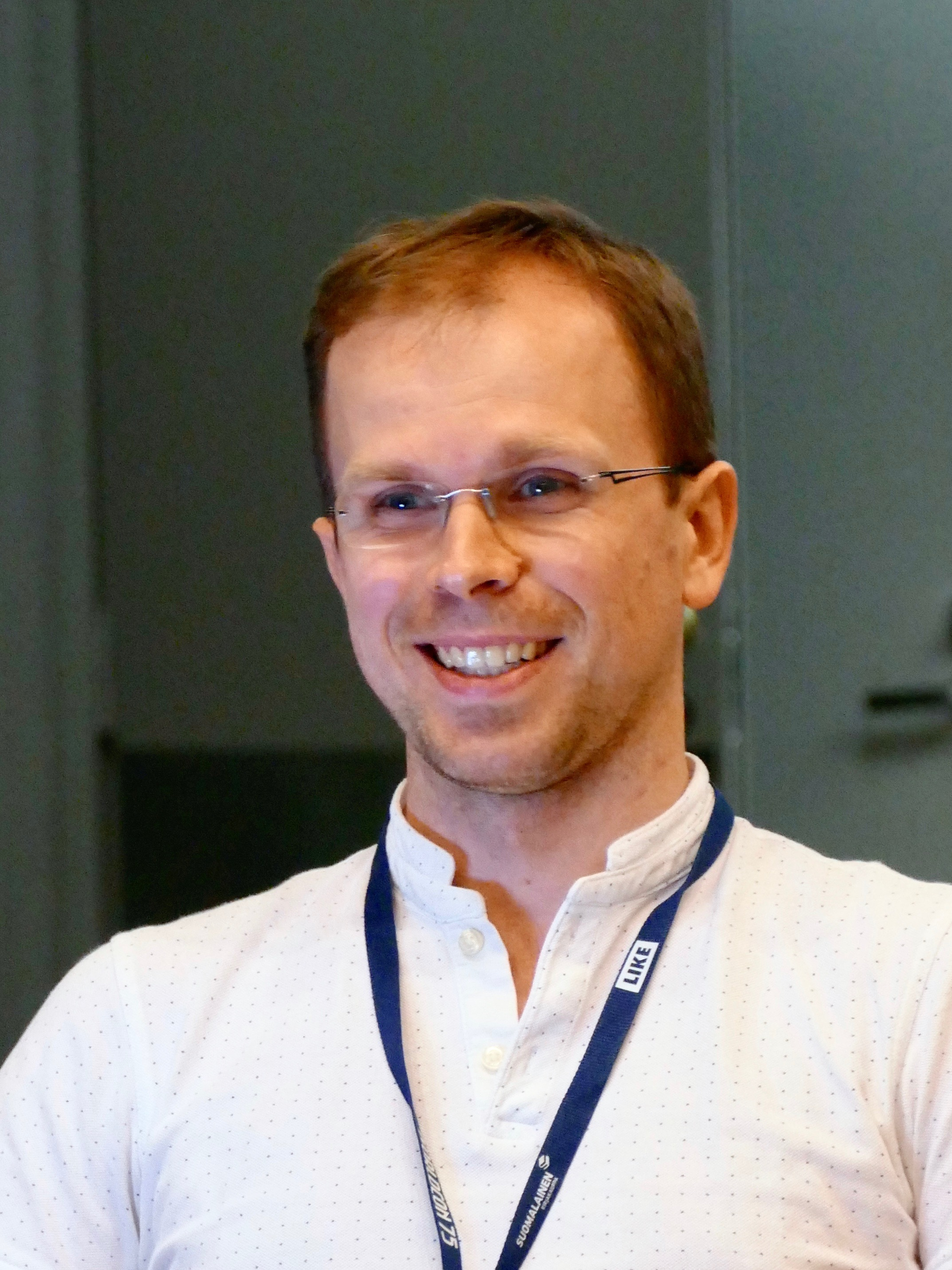
- Latvian author Tom Crosshill at the 75th Worldcon in Helsinki, Finland, in August 2017.
- Born: 1985 (age 40–41); Riga, Latvia
- Occupation: Author
- Writing career
- Pen name: Tom Crosshill
- Genre: Speculative fiction
- Website: www.tomcrosshill.com

Tom Crosshill (real name Toms Kreicbergs; born 1985) is a Latvian author of speculative and literary fiction, active since 2010. His work has appeared in publications in Chinese, Spanish, English, Finnish, Latvian and Polish. Crosshill has been nominated for several Nebula Awards and won the European Science Fiction Society Award for Best Author in 2016.

Kreicbergs is also an entrepreneur and investment trainer who started his career working on Wall Street in the US. Later he was a co-founder and the first CEO of the regulated asset management company INDEXO from 2017 to 2020. He has been shortlisted by Forbes Baltics in the "40 under 40" list of financial professionals.

== Biography ==
External videos
- “What giant robots teach us about life: Toms Kreicbergs at TEDxRiga”, June 20, 2014

Crosshill was born and raised in Riga, Latvia, where he learned English at an early age to read American speculative fiction in its original language. He studied physics at Reed College, Portland, Oregon, and later lived in New York and Iowa before returning to his native Latvia.

== Literary career ==
Crosshill honed his craft at the Del Rey Online Writing Workshop in the late 1990s and was later a member of the Altered Fluid writers' group in New York and attended the International Writing Program at the University of Iowa.

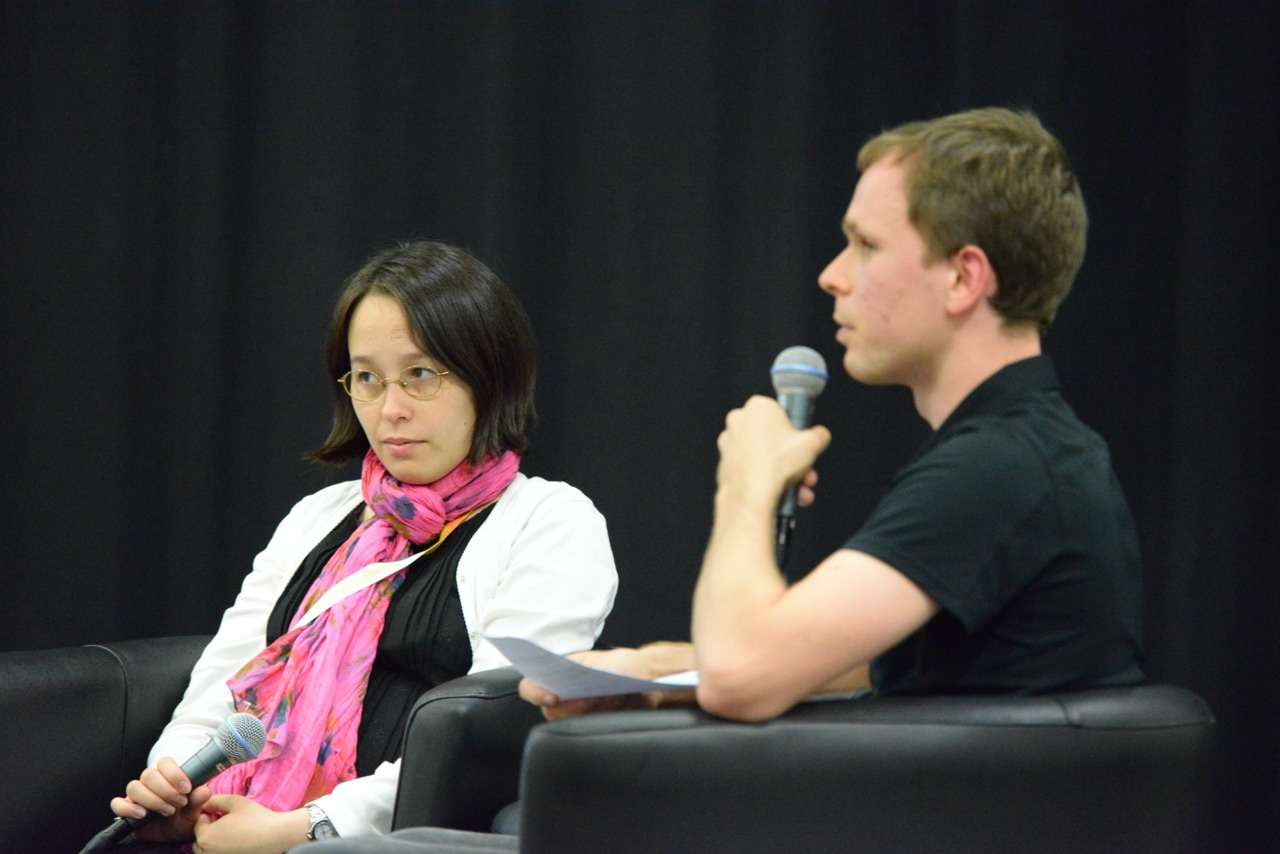
Aliette de Bodard (left) and Crosshill at Finncon 2013 in Helsinki, Finland

His work has appeared in various periodicals, podcasts and anthologies, including The Baltic Atlas, Beneath Ceaseless Skies, Clarkesworld, The Dunesteef Audio Fiction Magazine, Lightspeed, Nebula Awards Showcase 2016, Orson Scott Card's InterGalactic Medicine Show, Sybil's Garage, and Writers of the Future Volume XXVI.

== Recognition ==
Two of Crosshill's stories, "Mama, We Are Zhenya, Your Son" and "Fragmentation, or Ten Thousand Goodbyes," have been nominated for the Nebula Award for Best Short Story. One short story, "The Magician and Laplace's Demon," has been nominated for the Nebula Award for Best Novelette.

Crosshill's work has also been nominated for the WSFA Small Press Award and the Annual Latvian Literary Award. He was a winner in the Writers of the Future Contest, published in 2010. He won the European Science Fiction Society Award for Best Author in 2016.

== Bibliography ==
=== Novels ===
- The Cat King of Havana (2016)
- The Cattle Express: A Tale of Wall Street and Siberia (2016)

=== Collections ===
- Fragmentation: A Collection

=== Chapbooks ===
- Frammentazione, o diecimila arrivederci (2015; Italian translation of "Fragmentation, or Ten Thousand Goodbyes")

=== Short fiction ===
- "To Be Alone Again" (2010)
- "Waiting for Number Five" (2010)
- "Thinking Woman's Crop of Fools" (2010)
- "Seeing Double" (2010)
- "Express to Paris by Dragon First Class" (2010)
- "Mama, We Are Zhenya, Your Son" (2011)
- "Fragmentation, or Ten Thousand Goodbyes" (2012)
- "Bearslayer and the Black Knight" (2012)
- "A Well-Adjusted Man" (2012)
- "The Magician and Laplace's Demon" (2014)
- "The Dark City Luminous" (2016)
