= E. Lily Yu =

American author

- Education: Princeton University (AB); Cornell University (MA)
- Occupation: Author
- Writing career
- Genres: speculative fiction, nonfiction
- Notable awards: Astounding Award (2012)
- Website: elilyyu.com

E. Lily Yu is an American author and short story writer. In 2012, she received the Astounding Award for Best New Writer. Her debut novel, On Fragile Waves, received the Washington State Book Award and was a finalist for the Crawford Award.

== Early life and education ==
Yu attended Princeton University, graduating with an Bachelor of Arts in 2012. She later received a Master of Arts at Cornell University. She attended the Sewanee Writers’ Conference as a Tennessee Williams Scholar, then Clarion West in 2013.

== Career ==
E. Lily Yu published her first short story, “The Cartographer Wasps and the Anarchist Bees”, in 2011 in Clarkesworld. The story was nominated for the 2011 Nebula Award, 2012 Hugo Award, 2012 Locus Award, and 2012 World Fantasy Award. She received the 2012 Astounding Award for Best New Writer, previously known as the John W. Campbell Award for Best New Writer.

In 2017, she received the Artist Trust/Gar LaSalle Storyteller Award.

She is the author of more than thirty short stories, appearing in various venues, such as McSweeney's, Boston Review, Clarkesworld, F&SF, Cicada, Tor.com, Hazlitt, Terraform, and The Best Science Fiction and Fantasy of the Year.

On July 27, 2019, she released the short story "Zero in Babel".

Her debut novel, On Fragile Waves, was published in February 2021 by Erewhon Books. The book follows "the Daizangi family from war-torn Kabul, Afghanistan to Melbourne, Australia as they eke out a living as refugees," centering on the experiences of the daughter, Firuzeh, as the "ghost of her friend, Nasima, keeps her company throughout her journeys". The novel was named a finalist for the 2022 Crawford Award presented by the International Association for the Fantastic in the Arts.

Yu's debut short story collection, Jewel Box: Stories, was published in October 2023. Gary K. Wolfe at Locus noted, "Not surprisingly for anyone familiar with Yu’s work, many of the 22 stories are absolute gems, notable for their variety, clarity, and elegance" and "Yu’s jewels can be sharp-edged, but they can also be delightful". It was a finalist for the 2023 Los Angeles Times Book Prize in Science Fiction, Fantasy, and Speculative Fiction.

In July 2024, Yu published her first nonfiction book, Break, Blow, Burn, and Make: A Writer's Thoughts on Creation.

Yu has had several of her short stories that were previously published online "removed in response to LLM developers using online works for training without authorization."

== Awards ==
Year	Nominee	Award	Category	Result	Ref
2011	"The Cartographer Wasps and the Anarchist Bees"	Nebula Award	Short Story	Shortlisted	
2012	"The Cartographer Wasps and the Anarchist Bees"	Hugo Award	Short Story	Shortlisted	
2012	"The Cartographer Wasps and the Anarchist Bees"	Locus Award	Short Story	Nominated	
2012	"The Cartographer Wasps and the Anarchist Bees"	World Fantasy Award	Short Fiction	Shortlisted	
2012	"The Cartographer Wasps and the Anarchist Bees"	WSFA Press Award	—	Shortlisted	
2012	—	Astounding Award for Best New Writer	—	Won	
2014	"The Urashima Effect"	Theodore Sturgeon Award	—	Shortlisted	
2017	—	Gar LaSalle Storyteller Award	—	Won	
2021	On Fragile Waves	Endeavour Award	—	Shortlisted	
2022	On Fragile Waves	Crawford Award	—	Shortlisted	
2022	On Fragile Waves	Washington State Book Award	Fiction	Won	
2023	Jewel Box	Los Angeles Times Book Prize	Science Fiction, Fantasy, and Speculative Fiction	Shortlisted	
2024	Jewel Box	World Fantasy Award	Collection	Shortlisted	

== Bibliography ==
=== Novels ===
- On Fragile Waves (2021)

=== Collections ===
- Jewel Box: Stories (2023)

=== Nonfiction ===
- Break, Blow, Burn, and Make: A Writer's Thoughts on Creation (2024)

=== Short fiction ===
- "The Cartographer Wasps and the Anarchist Bees" (2012)
- "The Wretched and the Beautiful" (2017)
- "Zero in Babel" (2019)
