= Fantasy Magazine (2005) =

Science fiction & fantasy magazine 2005–2011

- Editor: Arley Sorg and Christie Yant
- Categories: Fantasy magazine
- Frequency: Monthly
- Founder: Sean Wallace
- Founded: 2005
- Company: Adamant Press
- Country: United States
- Language: English
- Website: www.fantasy-magazine.com

Fantasy Magazine was a monthly American online fantasy magazine that ran short fiction, poetry, and nonfiction (including essays and interviews).

== History ==
Fantasy was an American online fantasy and science fiction magazine from 2005 to 2011. It was launched as a print edition at the 2005 World Fantasy Convention in Madison, Wisconsin. It continued in this format for six more issues, but in mid-October 2007, it moved online, with daily content, and spun off an original anthology, titled Fantasy. The magazine published stories by for instance Peter S. Beagle, Jeffrey Ford, Theodora Goss, Caitlin Kiernan, Joe R. Lansdale, Nick Mamatas, Tim Pratt, Cat Rambo, Ekaterina Sedia, Catherynne M. Valente, and Jeff VanderMeer.

In January 2012, Fantasy was merged into its sister Lightspeed, and John Joseph Adams replaced Sean Wallace as publisher.

Fantasy relaunched in November 2020, under editors-in-chief Arley Sorg and Christie Yant. In August 2023, Sorg and Yant announced that Fantasy would be ceasing publication.

== Awards ==
- Chesley Awards, Best Magazine Cover, for Renee LeCompte's work on Fantasy Magazine 3
- SciFi Weekly’s Site of the Week, for February 13, 2008
- Million Writers Award, for best online publication, 2010
