= Fantasy magazine =

Magazine which publishes primarily fantasy fiction

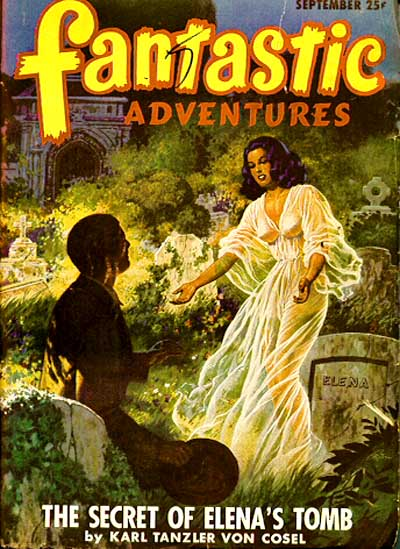
Fantastic Adventures magazine

A fantasy fiction magazine, or fantasy magazine, is a magazine which publishes primarily fantasy fiction. Magazines for children featuring characters such as Santa Claus are usually classified as children's magazines rather than fantasy magazines. Also excluded are adult magazines focused on erotic or sexual content, which are not part of the fantasy fiction genre. Many fantasy magazines, in addition to fiction, have other features such as art, cartoons, reviews, or letters from readers. Some fantasy magazines also publish science fiction and horror fiction, so there is not always a clear distinction between a fantasy magazine and a science fiction magazine. For example, Fantastic magazine often published science fiction and fantasy together, and for some periods focused predominantly on science fiction.

== Major fantasy magazines ==
=== Current magazines ===
- Abyss & Apex Magazine, 2003–present (US)
- Andromeda Spaceways Inflight Magazine, 2002–present (AUS)
- Apex Magazine, 2005–present (US)
- Aurealis, 1990–present (AUS)
- Bards and Sages Quarterly, 2009–present (US)
- Beneath Ceaseless Skies, 2008–present (US)
- Black Gate, 2001–present (US)
- Clarkesworld Magazine, 2006–present (US webzine)
- Daily Science Fiction, 2010–present (US webzine/email zine)
- Fantastyka, 1982–present, Poland; the oldest SF/fantasy magazine in Eastern Europe, print
- GUD Magazine, 2006–present (US print/pdf)
- Heavy Metal, 1974–present (US)
- Hypnos, 2012–present
- Illuminations of the Fantastic, 2020–current (online)
- Lady Churchill's Rosebud Wristlet, 1996–present (US zine)
- Lightspeed, 2006–present (US webzine)
  - (Fantasy magazine merged with Lightspeed to become one title in 2012)
- The Magazine of Fantasy & Science Fiction, 1949–present (US)
- Mir Fantastiki, 2003–present (RUS)
- Mithila Review, 2016–present (IND)
- On Spec, 1989–present (CAN)
- Orion's Child Science Fiction & Fantasy Magazine
- Postscripts Magazine, 2004–present (UK)
- Space and Time Magazine, 1966–present (US)
- Strange Horizons, 2000–present (US webzine)
- Three-lobed Burning Eye, 1999–present (online)
- Tor.com, 2008–present (US webzine)
- Weird Tales, 1923–1954 (US)
  - revivals, including 1986–present

=== Defunct magazines ===
- Absent Willow Review, 2008–2011
- Argosy, 1882–1942, 1942–1978, US
- Beyond Fantasy Fiction, 1953–1955, US
- Electric Velocipede, 2001–2013
- Famous Fantastic Mysteries, 1939–1953, US
- Fantastic, 1952–1980, US (title revived in the 2000s for the former Pirate Writings)
- Fantastic Adventures, 1939–1953, US
- Fantastic Novels, 1940–41, 1948–1951, US
- Fantasy Fiction, 1953, US
- Fantázia, Slovakia
- Fenix, 1990–2001, Poland
- Forgotten Fantasy, 1970–71, US
- Ideomancer, webzine, 2001–2015
- Imagination, 1950–1958, US
- Jim Baen's Universe, 2006–2010, US
- Marion Zimmer Bradley's Fantasy Magazine, 1988–2000, US
- Der Orchideengarten, 1919–1921, Germany
- Paradox Magazine, 2003–?
- Realms of Fantasy, 1994–2010, US
- Science Fantasy, 1950–1967, UK (a.k.a. Impulse)
- Shimmer Magazine, 2005–2018
- Subterranean Magazine, print 1995–2007, webzine 2007–2014
- Sybil's Garage, 2003–2010
- The Third Alternative, UK
- The Twilight Zone Magazine, 1981–1987, US
- Unknown, 1939–1943, US
- Whispers, 1973–1987, US

== See also ==
- Fan magazine
- Horror fiction magazine
- Science fiction magazine
