= Chesley Award for Best Art Director =

Award from Association of Science Fiction and Fantasy Artists

The Chesley Award for Best Art Director is given by the Association of Science Fiction and Fantasy Artists (ASFA) to recognize the achievements of a science fiction or fantasy art director eligible in the year previous to the award.

== Winners and nominees ==
Year	Winner	Other nominees
2004	Irene Gallo (Tor Books)	Arnie & Cathy Fenner (Spectrum 10); Howard & Jane Frank (The Haggard Project); Dawn Murin (Wizards of the Coast)
2005	Irene Gallo (Tor Books)	Scott Allie (Dark Horse Comics); Laura Cleveland (Realms of Fantasy); Robert Raper (Wizards of the Coast); David Stevenson (Del Rey Books)
2006	Irene Gallo (Tor Books)	Matt Adelsperger (Wizards of the Coast); Luis Fernandez (Walt Disney Studios); Carl Gnam (Realms of Fantasy); Dawn Murin (Wizards of the Coast)
2007	Irene Gallo (Tor Books)	Matt Adelsperger (Wizards of the Coast); Lou Anders (Pyr Books); David Stevenson (Del Rey Books); Jeremy Jarvis (Wizards of the Coast); Judith Murello (Berkeley Publishing Group); Nicolas Sica (Bookspan (SFBC)); Justin Stewart (Apex Magazine)
2008	Irene Gallo (Tor Books)	Matt Adelsperger (Wizards of the Coast); Shelly Bond (Vertigo (DC Comics)); Laura Cleveland (Realms of Fantasy); Karen Jacques (Wizards of the Coast); Deborah Kaplan (Penguin Books); Jeremy LaCroix (Wired Magazine); David Land (Dark Horse Comics); Robert Morrish (Cemetery Dance Publications); Jamie Warren-You'll (Bantam Books)
2009	Lou Anders (Pyr Books)	Matt Adelsperger (Wizards of the Coast); Scott Allie (Dark Horse Comics); Irene Gallo (Tor Books); Jeremy Jarvis (Wizards of the Coast); William Schafer (Subterranean Press); David Stevenson (Del Rey Books)
2010	Irene Gallo (Tor Books)	
2011	Jon Schindehette (Wizards of the Coast)	Lou Anders (Pyr Books); Irene Gallo (Tor Books); William Schafer (Subterranean Press); David Stevenson (Ballantine/Del Rey)
2012	Irene Gallo (Tor Books)	Matt Adelsperger (Wizards of the Coast); Lou Anders (Pyr Books); Irene Gallo (Tor Books); David Palumbo (Night Shade Books); Jon Schindehette (Wizards of the Coast)
