= Kelly Freas =

American science fiction artist (1922–2005)

Frank Kelly Freas
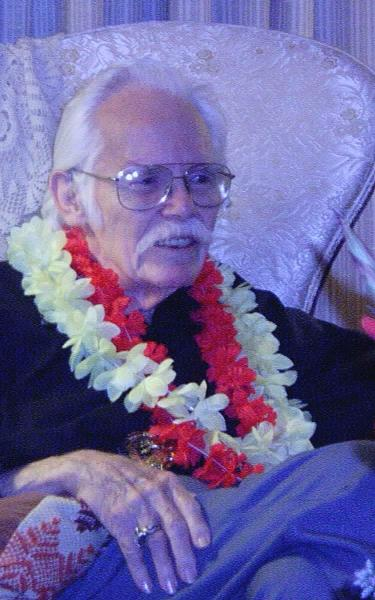
- Freas on his 82nd birthday (2004)
- Born: August 27, 1922; Hornell, New York, U.S.
- Died: January 2, 2005 (aged 82); West Hills, California, U.S.
- Resting place: Oakwood Memorial Park Cemetery
- Occupations: Artist, illustrator
- Writing career
- Pen name: Kelly Freas (occasional)
- Period: c. 1950–2004
- Genres: Fantasy, science fiction

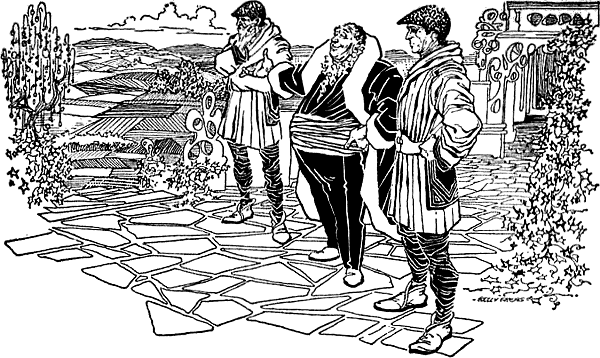
Art by Freas for "Disqualified" by Charles L. Fontenay, If magazine, September 1954.

Frank Kelly Freas (August 27, 1922 – January 2, 2005) was an American artist known for his work in science fiction and fantasy, with a career spanning more than 50 years. He was known as the "Dean of Science Fiction Artists" and he was the second artist inducted by the Science Fiction Hall of Fame. (Note: After inducting 36 fantasy and science fiction writers and editors from 1996 to 2004, the Science Fiction and Fantasy Hall of Fame dropped "fantasy" and made non-literary contributors eligible. Chesley Bonestell inaugurated the "Art" category in 2005.)

== Early life, education, and personal life ==
He was born August 27, 1922, in Hornell, New York, as Francis Sylvester Kelly. After his parents divorced, his mother remarried in 1939, and he took on his stepfather's last name of Freas. Frank Kelly Freas (pronounced like "freeze") was the son of two photographers, and was raised in Canada. He was educated at Lafayette High School in Buffalo, where he received training from long-time art teacher Elizabeth Weiffenbach. He entered the United States Army Air Forces right out of high school (Crystal Beach, Ontario, Canada). He flew as camera man for reconnaissance in the South Pacific and painted bomber noses during World War II. He then worked for Curtiss-Wright for a brief period, then went to study at The Art Institute of Pittsburgh and began to work in advertising. His first marriage was in 1948 to Nina Vaccaro, though they later divorced. He later married Pauline (Polly) Bussard in 1952; they had two children, Jacqui and Jerry. Polly died of cancer in January 1987. In 1988 he married (and is survived by) Dr. Laura Brodian.

== Career ==
Astounding Science Fiction cover, October 1953

Freas began his work as a commercial artist in the late 1940s, mostly for television. His goal was to become a science fiction artist.

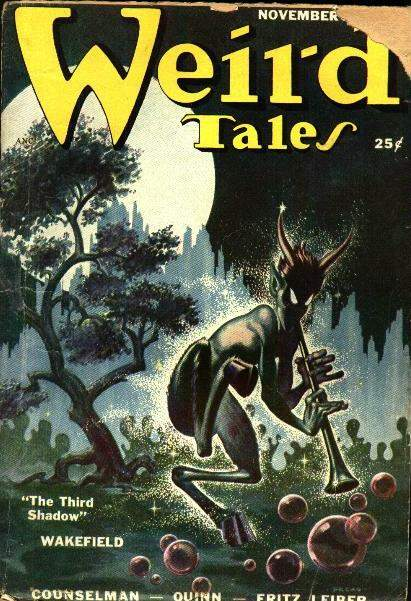
The Piper, illustrating Wakefield's "The Third Shadow" for Weird Tales, was Freas's first magazine cover, November 1950

The fantasy magazine Weird Tales published the first cover art by Freas on its November 1950 issue: "The Piper" illustrating "The Third Shadow" by H. Russell Wakefield. His second was a year later in the same magazine, followed by several Planet Stories or Weird Tales covers and interior illustrations for three Gnome Press books in 1952. With his illustrating career underway, he continued to devise unique and imaginative concepts for other fantasy and science fiction magazines of that period. In a field where airbrushing is common practice, paintings by Freas are notable for his use of bold brush strokes, and a study of his work reveals his experimentation with a wide variety of tools and techniques.

Over the next five decades, he created covers for hundreds of books and magazines (and much more interior artwork), notably Astounding Science Fiction, both before and after its title change to Analog, from 1953 to 2003. He started at Mad magazine in February 1957 and by July 1958 was the magazine's new cover artist; he painted most of its covers until October 1962 (featuring the iconic character, Alfred E. Neuman). He also created cover illustrations for DAW, Signet, Ballantine Books, Avon, all 58 Laser Books (which are now collector's items), and over 90 covers for Ace books alone. He was editor and artist for the first ten Starblaze books. He illustrated the cover of Jean Shepherd, Ian Ballantine, and Theodore Sturgeon's literary hoax, I, Libertine (Ballantine Books, 1956). That same year he drew cartoon illustrations for Bernard Shir-Cliff's The Wild Reader.

Freas also painted insignia and posters for Skylab I; pinup girls on bombers while in the United States Army Air Forces; comic book covers; the covers of the GURPS worldbooks Lensman and Planet Krishna; and more than 500 saints' portraits for the Franciscans executed simultaneously with his portraits of Alfred E. Neuman for Mad. He was very active in gaming and medical illustration. His cover of Queen's album News of the World (1977) was a pastiche of his October 1953 cover illustration for Tom Godwin's "The Gulf Between" for Astounding Science Fiction magazine.

Freas published several collections of his color and black-and-white artwork in the volumes Frank Kelly Freas: The Art of Science Fiction and Frank Kelly Freas: As Others See it, as well as in a spiral-bound collection of his black-and-white illustrations from Astounding Science Fiction. He also frequently gave art presentations, and his work appeared in numerous exhibitions. He was among several of the inaugural recipients of the Hugo Award for Best Artist in 1955 and was recipient under different names of the next three conferred in 1956, 1958, and 1959. (Note: There was no award for art on the 1957 WorldCon program. Thus in 1955–56 and 1958–59 Freas won the first four unified Hugo Awards for illustration, as the terminology changed from Artist to Outstanding Artist to Professional Artist. The only previous achievement awards at World Science Fiction Conventions recognized Interior and Cover illustration separately in 1953.) With six more Hugo awards to his name (1970 and 1972–76), he became the first person to receive ten Hugo awards (he was nominated 20 times). No other artist in science fiction has consistently matched his record and output.

Freas was twice a Guest of Honor at Worldcon, at Chicon IV in 1982 and at Torcon 3 in 2003, although a fall suffered shortly before the latter convention precluded him from attending.

He died in West Hills, California and is buried in Oakwood Memorial Park Cemetery in Chatsworth.

== Awards ==
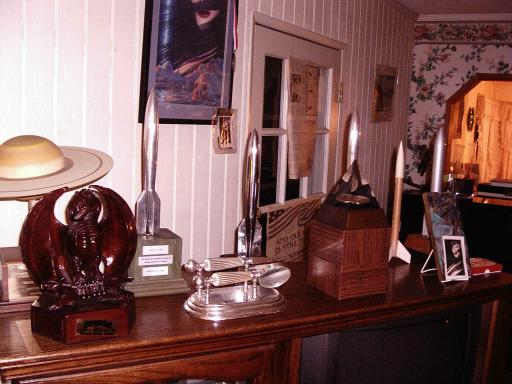
Some of Kelly Freas's awards (2004)

Freas's achievements include the Doctor of Arts, Art Institute of Pittsburgh, December 2003. The Science Fiction Hall of Fame inducted him in 2006, the second artist after Chesley Bonestell.

- Hugo Awards (11): Hugo Award for Best Artist 1955–56, 1958–59, 1970, 1972–76; fifty-year Retrospective Hugo, 2001 (for 1950 work)
- Locus Awards (6), 1972–75, best artist, including joint wins for Magazine Artist and Paperpack artist.
- Frank R. Paul Award, 1977
- Inkpot Award, 1979
- Edward E. Smith Memorial Award for Imaginative Fiction (the Skylark), 1981
- Rova Award, 1981
- Lensman Award, 1982
- Phoenix Award, 1982
- Los Angeles Science Fiction Society Service Award, 1983
- Neographics Award, 1985
- Daedalus Life Achievement Award, 1987
- Art Teacher Emeritus Award, 1988
- Best Professional, Media, International Fantasy Expo, 1989
- Chesley Awards (3): 1990 with Laura Freas, best 1989 cover illustration; 1994, artistic achievement; 2001, artistic achievement
- Numerous Science Fiction Art Show Awards
- National Association of Trade and Technical Schools National Hall of Fame, 1991
- AnLab (Analog) Reader Polls, Best Cover, 1992 and 2001
