= Lightspeed (magazine) =

American online fantasy and science fiction magazine

- Editor-in-Chief: John Joseph Adams
- Categories: fantasy and science fiction magazine
- Frequency: Monthly
- Founder: Sean Wallace
- First issue: June 2010; 15 years ago
- Company: Adamant Press
- Country: United States
- Language: English
- Website: www.lightspeedmagazine.com

Lightspeed is an American online fantasy and science fiction magazine edited and published by John Joseph Adams. The first issue was published in June 2010 and it has maintained a regular monthly schedule since. The magazine published four original stories and four reprints in every issue, in addition to interviews with the authors and other nonfiction. All of the content published in each issue is available for purchase as an ebook and for free on the magazine's website. Lightspeed also made selected stories available as a free podcast, produced by Audie Award–winning editor Stefan Rudnicki.

== History ==
Lightspeed was founded and run as a science fiction magazine by publisher Sean Wallace of Prime Books with John Joseph Adams as editor. Wallace also published Lightspeed's sister publication Fantasy Magazine; Adams came on as editor of Fantasy Magazine with the March 2011 issue. During this period the magazine was headquartered in Gaithersburg, Maryland. Lightspeed became an SFWA-qualifying market in July 2011.

In November 2011 Adams purchased Lightspeed and Fantasy Magazine from Wallace. With the January 2012 issue, the first published under Adams's ownership, the content of both magazines was combined under the Lightspeed masthead, and Fantasy Magazine was discontinued as an entity. The Fantasy Magazine staff was also absorbed into Lightspeed.

In September 2013, Lightspeed announced their first Special Issue, titled "Women Destroy Science Fiction", an anthology entirely written and edited by women. This issue was funded via Kickstarter, earning $53,136 with an original goal of $5,000. The additional funds allowed Lightspeed to publish further volumes, entitled "Women Destroy Fantasy" and "Women Destroy Horror." "Women Destroy Science Fiction" was designated as the "Book of Honor" at the 24th Potlatch in 2015.

== Awards and recognition ==
Lightspeed was a finalist for the Hugo Award for Best Semiprozine in 2011, 2012, and 2013, and won in 2014 and 2015. In 2011 its podcast was awarded a Parsec award for Maggie Clark's "Saying the Names."

In 2010, two Lightspeed stories were finalists for the Nebula Award for Best Short Story: Adam-Troy Castro's "Arvies" and Vylar Kaftan's "I'm Alive, I Love You, I'll See You in Reno" and in 2011 "Amaryllis" by Carrie Vaughn was a finalist for the Hugo Award for Best Short story. In 2011, Adam-Troy Castro's "Her Husband's Hands" and Tom Crosshill's "Mama, We are Zhenya, Your Son" were finalists for the Best Short Story Nebula, while Jake Kerr's "The Old Equations" was nominated for Best Novella. In 2012, Maria Dahvana Headley's "Give Her Honey When You Hear Her Scream" and Ken Liu's "The Bookmaking Habits of Select Species" were both finalists for the Best Short Story Nebula. In 2014, Ken Liu's "The Litigation Master and the Monkey King" and Christopher Barzak's "Paranormal Romance" were both finalists for the Best Novelette Nebula. In 2014, Matthew Kressel's "The Sounds of Old Earth" and Sylvia Spruck Wrigley's "Alive, Alive Oh" were both finalists for the Best Short Story Nebula.

Some stories were nominated for the Theodore Sturgeon Award: Yoon Ha Lee's "Flower, Mercy, Needle, Chain" in 2011, Jake Kerr's "The Old Equations" in 2012, and Ken Liu's "The Bookmaking Habits of Select Species" in 2013.

Several stories published in the magazine have been reprinted in anthologies devoted to recognizing excellence in the genre:

- The Year's Best Science Fiction, edited by Gardner Dozois, "Flower, Mercy, Needle, Chain" by Yoon Ha Lee, "In-Fall" by Ted Kosmatka, and "Amaryllis" by Carrie Vaughn
- The Year's Best Science Fiction and Fantasy edited by Rich Horton, "Arvies" by Adam-Troy Castro, "No Time Like the Present" by Carol Emshwiller, "Flower, Mercy, Needle, Chain" by Yoon Ha Lee, and "Standard Loneliness Package" by Charles Yu
- The Best Science Fiction and Fantasy of the Year edited by Jonathan Strahan, "The Zeppelin Conductors' Society Annual Gentlemen's Ball" by Genevieve Valentine
- Year's Best SF 16, edited by David G. Hartwell and Kathryn Cramer, "How to Become a Mars Overlord" by Catherynne M. Valente, and "The Cassandra Project" by Jack McDevitt
