= Endeavour Award =

Annual American literary award

The Endeavour Award, announced annually at OryCon in Portland, Oregon, is awarded to a distinguished science fiction or fantasy book written by an author or authors from the Pacific Northwest (Oregon, Washington, Idaho, British Columbia, The Yukon, and Alaska) and published in the previous year.

Annual presentation of the Endeavour Award was originally in November at OryCon for books published during the previous year. Following the end of OryCon the award was presented at a dedicated Endevour Witers Conference in 2026.

== OryCon ==
OryCon was an annual science fiction/fantasy convention, held annually in Portland, Oregon since 1979. OryCon's parent organization, Oregon Science Fiction Conventions, Inc. ("OSFCI") has announced plans to end support for the event after OryCon 45, to be held in October 2025.

On November 11, 1978, the Portland Science Fiction Society and Portland State University English department presented a one-day, seven-hour "Science Fiction Symposium" at the Smith Memorial Student Union. The organizers later established OSFCI, and presented the first OryCon the following year.

The convention canceled its 2020 event due to COVID-19 restrictions, returning in 2021, and declared a "hiatus" for future events, citing staff burnout and the challenges of pandemic-era planning. 2022 instead featured a free "Or-E-Con 2" virtual conference.

== Award history ==
The Endeavour Award, named for HM Bark Endeavour, the ship of Northwest explorer Captain James Cook, was first presented in 1999.

It was funded by a collaboration of Portland, Oregon area writers and readers of science fiction and fantasy in 1996 and chartered by Oregon Science Fiction Conventions, Inc. (OSFCI) tax-exempt non-profit corporation.

=== 2020 Endeavour Award ===
Matt Hughes became the first Canadian winner of the Endeavour Award, for his 2019 slipstream historical novel What the Wind Brings.

=== 2021 Endeavour Award ===
The Endeavour Award committee announced suspension of the 2021 Endeavour Award for books published in 2020, citing COVID-19 pandemic restrictions. The award was revisited and a winner announced at Norwescon 45, held in SeaTac, Washington, on April 6–9, 2023.

=== 2022 Endeavour Award ===
The 2022 Endeavour Award was announced at OryCon 43, held in Portland, Oregon, November 10–12, 2023.

== Winners and nominees ==
Year	Title	Author	Result	Ref
1999	Dinosaur Summer	Greg Bear	Won	
2000	Darwin's Radio	Greg Bear	Won	
2001 (tie)	The Telling	Ursula K. Le Guin	Won	
2001 (tie)	The Glass Harmonica	Louise Marley	Won	
2002	Tales from Earthsea	Ursula K. Le Guin	Won	
2003 (tie)	The Disappeared	Kristine Kathryn Rusch	Won	
2003 (tie)	Lion's Blood	Steven Barnes	Won	
2004	Red Thunder	John Varley	Won	
2005	The Child Goddess	Louise Marley	Won	
2006	Anywhere but Here	Jerry Oltion	Won	
2007	Forest Mage	Robin Hobb	Won	
2008	The Silver Ship and the Sea	Brenda Cooper	Won	
2009	Space Magic	David D. Levine	Won	
2010	Mind Over Ship	David Marusek	Won	
2011	Dreadnought	Cherie Priest	Won	
2012	City of Ruins	Kristine Kathryn Rusch	Won	
2013	Goodbye For Now	Laurie Frankel	Won	
2014 (tie)	Nexus	Ramez Naam	Won	
2014 (tie)	Requiem	Ken Scholes	Won	
2015	Last Plane to Heaven	Jay Lake	Won	
2016	Edge of Dark	Brenda Cooper	Won	
2017 (tie)	Dreams of Distant Shores	Patricia A. McKillip	Won	
2017 (tie)	Lovecraft Country	Matt Ruff	Won	
2018	The Cold Eye	Laura Anne Gilman	Won	
2019	Blood Orbit	K. R. Richardson	Won	
2020 (tie)	What the Wind Brings	Matthew Hughes	Won	
2020 (tie)	The Witch's Kind	Louisa Morgan	Won	
2021	How to Get to Apocalypse	Erica L. Satifka	Won	
2022	The Bone Orchard	Sara A. Mueller	Won	
2023	Painted Devils	Margaret Owen	Won	
2023	Bookshops & Bonedust	Travis Baldree	Nominated	
2023	Vampires of El Norte	Isabel Cañas	Nominated	
2023	Again and Again	Jonathan Evison	Nominated	
2023	Sleep No More	Seanan McGuire	Nominated	
2024	Relics of Ruin	Erin M. Evans	Won	
2024	Better Living Through Alchemy	Evan J. Peterson	Nominated	
2024	Heavenbreaker	Sara Wolf	Nominated	
2024	The Rain Artist	Claire Rudy Foster	Nominated	
2024	Tidal Creatures	Seanan McGuire	Nominated	
2025	The Antidote	Karen Russell	Won	
2025	Blind Date with a Werewolf	Patricia Briggs	Nominated	
2025	Hole in the Sky	Daniel H. Wilson	Nominated	
2025	Making Amends	Nisi Shawl	Nominated	
2025	When We Were Real	Daryl Gregory	Nominated	
