= Isabel J. Kim =

American fiction writer

- Kim in 2026
- Born: February 1996 (age 30); Morristown, New Jersey, U.S.
- Education: University of Pennsylvania (BA); University of Pennsylvania Law School (JD)
- Occupations: Writer; lawyer
- Writing career
- Genre: Speculative fiction
- Notable awards: Shirley Jackson Award (2021); Nebula Award (2024); Locus Award (2025)
- Website: www.isabel.kim

Isabel J. Kim (born February 1996) is a Korean-American speculative fiction writer. Her short stories have won the Nebula Award, Locus Award, BSFA Award, and Shirley Jackson Award. Her work has been featured in Clarkesworld Magazine, Lightspeed, Apex Magazine, Strange Horizons, Fantasy Magazine, Beneath Ceaseless Skies, Cast of Wonders, Reactor, and khōréō.

In April 2024, Universal International Studios acquired the rights to her planned debut novel, Sublimation. The novel is part of a three-book deal with Tor Books.

== Early life and education ==
Isabel J. Kim was born in Morristown, New Jersey. Her family moved to South Korea, following her father's job as a physics professor, and later California. The family continued to split their time between Santa Barbara, California and Daejeon, South Korea before returning to New Jersey when Kim was eleven.

Kim is a two-time graduate of the University of Pennsylvania. She completed her bachelor's degree in Creative Writing and Fine Arts before pursuing her JD at the University of Pennsylvania Law School.

== Career ==
Kim worked as a lawyer in New York City until late 2025 when she became a full-time writer.

Kim started publishing speculative fiction in 2021 and won the Shirley Jackson Award for "You'll Understand When You're a Mom Someday," her second published story. She won the Clarkesworld reader poll in the Best Short Story category for "Calf Cleaving in the Benthic Black" in 2022. Her work has appeared on the Locus Recommended Reading List for 2021, 2022, and 2023.

She was nominated for the Astounding Award for Best New Writer in 2023 in her second year of eligibility for the award. Her story "Why Don't We Just Kill the Kid In the Omelas Hole" won the 2024 Nebula Award for Best Short Story, the 2024 BSFA Award for Short Fiction, and the 2025 Locus Award for Best Short Story. It was a finalist for the 2025 Hugo Award for Best Short Story and the 2025 Theodore Sturgeon Award.

In 2024, Kim co-authored an interactive fiction game A Death in Hyperspace (Infomancy.net) with nine other writers: Stewart C. Baker, Phoebe Barton, James Beamon, Kate Heartfield, Sara S. Messenger, JingJing Xiao, Natalia Theodoridou, M. Darusha Wehm, and Merc Fenn Wolfmoor. It won the 2024 Nebula Award for Best Game Writing.

She co-hosts the internet culture podcast Wow If True with journalist Amanda Silberling.

Kim's short story "Wire Mother" was a finalist for the 2026 Locus Award, Hugo Award, and Theodore Sturgeon Award.

Her story "Human Voices" was nominated for the 2026 Ignyte Award for Outstanding Novelette.

Kim's debut novel, Sublimation, was published on June 2, 2026 from Tor Books. It was one of USA Today's "Most anticipated books of 2026," and became an instant USA Today Bestseller. It received a starred reviews from Publishers Weekly and Booklist.

"A strikingly original work of speculative fiction that brilliantly uses an audacious conceit—that immigration literally splits a person into two separate “instances” of themselves, one who moves to their new home and one who stays behind... A sharp, deeply felt first outing from a writer already at the top of her game." —Publishers Weekly

In September 2026, Kim announced her upcoming second novel and first young adult fantasy novel, The Apprentice Liar and the Death of the World. The book will be published by Union Square & Co. on March 2, 2027.

== Awards ==
Year	Title	Award	Category	Result	Ref
2021	"You'll Understand When You're a Mom Someday"	Shirley Jackson Award	Short Fiction	Won	
2023	—	Astounding Award for Best New Writer	—	Finalist	
2024	A Death in Hyperspace (co-author)	Nebula Award	Game Writing	Won	
2024	"Why Don't We Just Kill the Kid In the Omelas Hole"	BSFA Award	Short Story	Won	
2024	"Why Don't We Just Kill the Kid In the Omelas Hole"	Nebula Award	Short Story	Won	
2025	"Why Don't We Just Kill the Kid In the Omelas Hole"	Hugo Award	Short Story	Finalist	
2025	"Why Don't We Just Kill the Kid In the Omelas Hole"	Locus Award	Short Story	Won	
2025	"Why Don't We Just Kill the Kid In the Omelas Hole"	Theodore Sturgeon Award	—	Finalist	
2026	"Wire Mother"	Hugo Award	Short Story	Finalist	
2026	"Wire Mother"	Locus Award	Short Story	Finalist	
2026	"Wire Mother"	Theodore Sturgeon Award	—	Finalist	
2026	"Human Voices"	Ignyte Award	Novelette	Finalist	

== Bibliography ==
=== Novel ===
- Sublimation. Tor Books. 2026. ISBN 9781250376794.
- The Apprentice Liar and the Death of the World. Union Square & Co. 2027. ISBN 9781454959335.

=== Short fiction ===
- "Homecoming is Just Another Word for the Sublimation of the Self", Clarkesworld Magazine (March 2021)
- "You'll Understand When You're a Mom Someday" khōréō (October 2021)
- "AP Practical Literary Theory Suggests This Is a Quest", Cast of Wonders (November 2021)
- "Clay", Beneath Ceaseless Skies (January 2022)
- "The Massage Lady at Munjeong Road Bathhouse", Clarkesworld Magazine (February 2022)
- "Plausible Realities, Improbable Dreams", Lightspeed Magazine (February 2022)
- "Christopher Mills, Return to Sender", Fantasy Magazine (February 2022)
- "You, Me, Her, You, Her, I", Strange Horizons (June 2022)
- "Termination Stories for the Cyberpunk Dystopia Protagonist", Clarkesworld Magazine (July 2022)
- "Calf Cleaving in the Benthic Black", Clarkesworld Magazine (November 2022)
- "The Big Glass Box and the Boys Inside", Apex Magazine (January 2023)
- "The Narrative Implications of Your Untimely Death", Lightspeed Magazine (January 2023)
- "Zeta-Epsilon", Clarkesworld Magazine (March 2023)
- "Day Ten Thousand", Clarkesworld Magazine (June 2023)
- "The Labyrinth Loop", Assemble Artifacts (June 2023)
- "You Will Not Live to See M/M Horrors Beyond Your Comprehension", Lightspeed Magazine (August 2023)
- "Why Don't We Just Kill the Kid in the Omelas Hole", Clarkesworld Magazine (February 2024)
- "Freediver," Reactor (September 2025)
- "Human Voices", Lightspeed Magazine (September 2025)
- "Wire Mother", Clarkesworld Magazine (October 2025)
- "The Perpetual Post", Reactor (May 2026)
- "Nomenclature", Strange Pilgrims (May 2026)
- "The Meat Market", Clarkesworld Magazine (November 2026)

=== Anthology appearances ===
- Paula Guran, ed. (2023). "The Massage Lady at Munjeong Road Bathhouse". The Year’s Best Fantasy, Volume 2. Pyr. ISBN 9781645060499.
- R.F. Kuang; John Joseph Adams, eds. (2023). "Termination Stories for the Cyberpunk Dystopia Protagonist". The Best American Science Fiction and Fantasy 2023. Mariner Books. ISBN 9780063315747.
- Vajra Chandrasekera, ed. (2024). "Day Ten Thousand". Afterlives: The Year's Best Death Fiction 2023. Psychopomp. ISBN 9798891160064.
- Allan Kaster, ed. (2024). "Zeta-Epsilon". The Year's Top Robot and AI Stories: Fifth Annual Collection. Infinivox. ISBN 9781884612596.
- Hugh Howey; John Joseph Adams, eds. (2024). "Zeta-Epsilon". The Best American Science Fiction and Fantasy 2024. Mariner Books. ISBN 9780063315785.
- Stephen Kotowych, ed. (2025). "Why Don't We Just Kill the Kid in the Omelas Hole". Nebula Awards Showcase 60. Sfwa, Inc. ISBN 9781958243084.
- Nnedi Okorafor; John Joseph Adams, eds. (2025). "Why Don't We Just Kill the Kid in the Omelas Hole". The Best American Science Fiction and Fantasy 2025. Mariner Books. ISBN 9780063441477.
- Olivie Blake; John Joseph Adams, eds. (2026). "Human Voices". The Best American Science Fiction and Fantasy 2026. Mariner Books. ISBN 9780063441521.
- Neil Ckarke, ed. (2026). The Best Science Fiction of the Year: 2025. Wyrm Publishing. ISBN 9781625677556.
