= Natalia Theodoridou =

Greek writer

- Born: c. 1984 (age c. 41); Thessaloniki, Central Macedonia, Greece
- Notable work: Sour Cherry (2025)
- Awards: World Fantasy Award (2018); Nebula Award (2024); Locus Award (2026)
- Website: www.natalia-theodoridou.com

Natalia Theodoridou (born c. 1984) is a Greek novelist, interactive fiction writer, and scholar. He was the fiction editor at sub-Q, an interactive fiction magazine. The magazine entered indefinite hiatus starting August 2020. As of 2025, he has been nominated for the Nebula Award for Best Game Writing four times (and won in 2024). His fiction has been nominated for the Nebula Award and multiple BSFA Awards.

== Early life and education ==
Theodoridou attended the Aristotle University of Thessaloniki for his undergraduate studies, earning a Bachelor of Arts degree in theatre. He subsequently attended the Royal Holloway, University of London in the United Kingdom, earning a Master of Research in drama studies. He also earned a Master of Arts in religious studies at the University of Chicago in the United States, as part of the Fulbright Program.

He received a PhD in Media & Cultural Studies from the SOAS University of London. As part of his PhD, he spent fifteen months doing fieldwork in Indonesia researching Balinese dance.

Theodoridou is also a graduate of the Clarion West Writers Workshop, class of 2018.

== Career ==
Theodoridou's "The Birding: A Fairy Tale", published in Strange Horizons, was the winner of the 2018 World Fantasy Award for short fiction. It is about a plague that turns nearly everyone in the world into birds. The work was also adapted into podcast format.

In 2024, Theodoridou co-authored an interactive fiction game A Death in Hyperspace (Infomancy.net) with nine other writers: Stewart C. Baker, Phoebe Barton, James Beamon, Kate Heartfield, Sara S. Messenger, JingJing Xiao, Isabel J. Kim, M. Darusha Wehm, and Merc Fenn Wolfmoor. It won the 2024 Nebula Award for Best Game Writing.

Theodoridou's debut novel, Sour Cherry, came out in April 2025 from Tin House (North America) and Wildfire (UK & Commonwealth). The novel won the 2026 Locus Award for Best First Novel. It was a finalist for the 2025 Nebula Award for Best Novel and a finalist/honorable mention for the 2026 Crawford Award.

=== Themes ===
In a 2025 interview with Clarkesworld, Theodoridou stated that the themes he emphasised in his writing were ones of "transformation, diaspora, gender feels, migration, violence personal and political (I don’t see a difference), myths and fairy tales, intertextuality, queerness."

== Awards ==
- Greek Scientific Society Award, 2003
- Scholarship by the Greek State Scholarship Foundation (IKY) for undergraduate studies, 2002–2005
- MA Studentship (Drama & Theatre Department, Royal Holloway University of London), 2007–2008
- Fulbright Scholar, 2008–2010
- SOAS Research Scholarship 2010–2013, & Additional Award for Fieldwork, 2010
- Ouseley Memorial Scholarship, 2011–2013
- World Fantasy Award for Short Fiction, 2018
- Word Factory Apprentice Award, 2018
- Emerging Writer Award (Moniack Mhor and The Bridge Awards), 2022
- Nebula Award for Best Game Writing, 2024
- Locus Award for Best First Novel, 2026

== Bibliography ==
=== Novels ===
- Sour Cherry (2025, Tin House Books (US), ISBN 978-1963108194, Wildfire (UK), ISBN 978-1035416189 )

=== Interactive Fiction ===
The following works were nominated for the Nebula Award for Best Game Writing.

- Rent-A-Vice (2018)
- Vampire: The Masquerade (Choice of Games) - Sins of the Sires (2022)
- Restore, Reflect, Retry (2024)
- A Death in Hyperspace (2024)

=== Poetry ===
- "Blackmare" (2013)
- "Ex Machina" (2014)
- "Philomela in Seven Movements" (2015)
- "An Inventory of Ghosts" (2015)

=== Short fiction ===
Title	Year	First published	Reprinted / collected	Notes
"The Nightingales in Plátres"	2017	Theodoridou, Natalia (November 2017). "The Nightingales in Plátres". Clarkesworld (133): 21–33.		Nominated BSFA for Best Short Fiction 2017
"The Birding: A Fairy Tale"	2017	Theodoridou, Natalia (18 December 2017). "The Birding: A Fairy Tale". Strange Horizons.		Winner, World Fantasy Award 2018
"The Names of Women"	2018	Theodoridou, Natalia (11 October 2018). "The Names of Women". Strange Horizons Fund Drive Special.		Nominated BSFA for Best Short Fiction 2018
"Birnam Platoon"	2018	Theodoridou, Natalia (November–December 2018). "Birnam Platoon". Interzone (278): 62–73.		Nominated BSFA for Best Short Fiction 2018
"Georgie in the Sun"	2020	Theodoridou, Natalia (March–April 2020). "Georgie in the Sun". Uncanny Magazine (33).		Placed 34th Locus for Best Short Story 2021
"The Shape of Gifts"	2020	Theodoridou, Natalia (July–August 2020). "The Shape of Gifts". F&SF. 139 (1&2): 239–256.		
"To Set at Twilight in a Land of Reeds"	2020	Theodoridou, Natalia (October 2020). "To Set at Twilight in a Land of Reeds". Clarkesworld (169): 12–21.		
"Ribbons"	2022	Theodoridou, Natalia (2022). "Ribbons". Uncanny Magazine (44).		
"The Prince of Salt and the Ocean's Bargain"	2022	Theodoridou, Natalia (2022). "The Prince of Salt and the Ocean's Bargain". Uncanny Magazine (48)		Nominated for Nebula Award for Best Novelette 2022.
"Love at the Event Horizon"	2023	Theodoridou, Natalia (2023). "Love at the Event Horizon". Uncanny Magazine (53).		
"Tell the King"	2024	Theodoridou, Natalia (2024). "Tell the King". Beneath Ceaseless Skies #401.		2024 Locus Recommended Reading List
"Cursed Moon Queers"	2024	Theodoridou, Natalia (2024). "Cursed Moon Queers". Uncanny Magazine (60).		
"UPDATE: The Buildings Are Hungry and the Plague Can Speak"	2025	Theodoridou, Natalia (2025). "UPDATE: The Buildings Are Hungry and the Plague Can Speak". Psychopomp.		
