= Glass harmonica (disambiguation) =

Glass harmonica may refer to:

- Glass harmonica, a musical instrument
- The Glass Harmonica, a 2000 novel by Louise Marley
- The Glass Harmonica (film), a 1968 short animated film by Andrei Khrzhanovsky

== See also ==
- Harmonica
