= Ken Scholes =

American writer (born 1968)

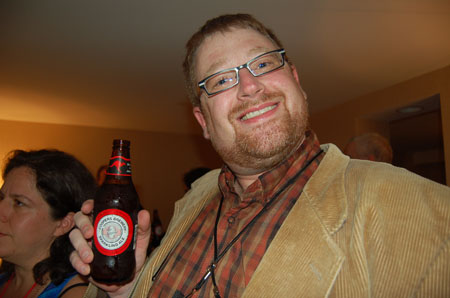
- Scholes in 2007
- Born: January 13, 1968 (age 58)
- Writing career
- Period: Early 21st century
- Genres: Science fiction, fantasy
- Website: kenscholes.com

Ken Scholes (born January 13, 1968) is an American science fiction and fantasy writer living in Cornelius, Oregon, United States.

He is the author of five novels and over fifty short stories and his work has appeared in print since 2000. His series, The Psalms of Isaak, is published by Tor Books and his short fiction has been collected in three volumes published by Fairwood Press.

Ken is a winner of the Writers of the Future Award, France's Prix Imaginales, the Endeavour Award and others. His work has been published internationally in eight languages.

His first novel, Lamentation, was based on a previous short story entitled "Of Metal Men and Scarlet Thread and Dancing with the Sunrise", and is the first of five in the Psalms of Isaak saga.

== Biography ==
Ken's eclectic background includes time spent as a label gun repairman, a sailor who never sailed, a soldier who commanded a desk, a preacher, a nonprofit executive and a government procurement analyst. He has a degree in history from Western Washington University. His nickname is Trailer Boy in homage to his childhood home on the outskirts of a small logging town in Washington State. Ken is a public advocate for people living with C-PTSD and speaks openly about his experiences with it. Ken is also a performing musician, presenter and occasional creative consultant. Ken is a native of the Pacific Northwest and makes his home in Cornelius, Oregon, where he lives with his twin daughters.

== Books ==
=== The Psalms of Isaak ===
1. Lamentation, Tor Books, February 2009
2. Canticle, Tor Books, October 2009
3. Antiphon, Tor Books, September 2010
4. Requiem, Tor Books, June 2013
5. Hymn, Tor Books, December 2017

=== Short fiction collections ===
- Long Walks, Last Flights, and Other Strange Journeys, Fairwood Press, 2008
- Diving Mimes, Weeping Czars and Other Unusual Suspects, Fairwood Press, 2010
- Blue Yonders, Grateful Pies and Other Fanciful Feasts, Fairwood Press, 2015

=== Other books ===
- Last Flight of the Goddess, Fairwood Press, 2006
- Metatropolis: The Wings We Dare Aspire, co-authored with Jay Lake, WordFire Press, 2014

== Short fiction ==
- "The Taking Night", Talebones, Winter 2000
- "So Sang the Girl Who Had No Name", Twilight Showcase, 2001 and Fortean Bureau, December 2004
- "Edward Bear and the Very Long Walk", Talebones, Spring 2001 and Best of the Rest 3: Best Unknown Science Fiction and Fantasy of 2001, ed. Brian Youmans, Suddenly Press, 2002 and Revolution SF, July 2006 and Escape Pod, February 2008
- "Fearsome Jones' Discarded Love Collection", Fortean Bureau, July 2004
- "A Good Hair Day in Anarchy", Lone Star Stories, June 2005 and Best of the Rest 4: Best Unknown Science Fiction and Fantasy of 2005, ed. Brian Youmans, Suddenly Press, 2006
- "Into the Blank Where Life is Hurled", L. Ron Hubbard Presents Writers of the Future Volume XXI, ed. Algis Budrys, Galaxy Press, 2005
- "The Santaman Cycle", TEL:Stories, ed. Jay Lake, Wheatland Press, 2005
- "On the Settling of Ancient Scores", Son and Foe, November 2005
- "The Man With Great Despair Behind His Eyes", Talebones, Winter 2005 and Prime Codex, ed. Lawrence M. Schoen and Michael Livingston, Paper Golem, 2007
- "That When I Waked I Cried to Dream Again", Insidious Reflections, January 2006
- "Action Team-Ups Number Thirty-Seven", Shimmer Magazine, Winter 2006
- "East of Eden and Just a Bit South", Aeon Speculative Fiction, February 2006
- "There Once Was a Girl From Nantucket (A Fortean Love Story)" (with John A. Pitts), Fortean Bureau, March 2006
- "Of Metal Men and Scarlet Thread and Dancing with the Sunrise", Realms of Fantasy, August 2006 and Best New Fantasy 2, ed. Sean Wallace, Prime Books
- "That Old-Time Religion", Weird Tales, November 2007
- "Soon We Shall All Be Saunders", Polyphony 6, ed. Deborah Layne and Jay Lake, Wheatland Press, 2006
- "One Small Step", Aeon Speculative Fiction, Issue 9, November 2006
- "The Great Little Falls Revival", Science Fiction Trails, Pirate Dog Press, ed. David P. Riley, 2007
- "Summer in Paris, Light from the Sky", Clarkesworld Magazine, November 2007
- What Child Is This, I Ask the Midnight Clear", Shimmer Magazine Holiday Chapbook, Winter 2007
- "The Doom of Love in Small Spaces", Realms of Fantasy, April 2008
- "The God-Voices of Settler's Rest", Intergalactic Medicine Show, July 2008
- "The Night the Stars Sang Out My Name", Abyss and Apex, Third Quarter 2008.
- "Invisible Empire of Ascending Light", Eclipse 2, Nightshade Books, ed. Jonathan Strahen, 2008
- "The Second Gift Given", Clarkesworld Magazine, February 2009
- "A Weeping Czar Beholds the Fallen Moon", tor.com, February 2009
- "Love in the Time of Car Alarms", The Trouble with Heroes, ed. Denise Little, DAW Books, November 2009
- "In Time of Despair and Darkness", Realms of Fantasy, December 2009
- "The Starship Mechanic" (with Jay Lake), tor.com, January 2010
- "A Symmetry of Serpents and Doves", Metatropolis: Cascadia, Audible Frontiers, ed. John Scalzi, November 2010
- "Making My Entrance Again With My Usual Flair", tor.com, January 2011
- "If Dragon's Mass Eve Be Cold and Clear", tor.com, December 2011
