= Giambastiani =

Giambastiani is an Italian surname. Notable people with the surname include:

- Edmund Giambastiani (born 1948), United States Navy admiral
- Kurt R. A. Giambastiani (born 1958), American writer
