= Still Falling (disambiguation) =

Still Falling is a Nigerian romantic drama film

Still Falling may also refer to:

- "Still Falling", a song by Lostprophets from the EP Can't Catch Tomorrow (Good Shoes Won't Save You This Time)
- "Still Falling", a song by the Morning After Girls from Alone
- "Still Falling", a song by Much the Same from Quitters Never Win
- "Still Falling", a song by Saybia from The Second You Sleep
- "Still Falling", a song by Y&T from Endangered Species
- Still Falling, an album by Virgil Shaw
- Still Falling, a short story by Kurt R. A. Giambastiani
