= Nebula Award for Best Game Writing =

American science fiction game award

- Awarded for: The best science fiction or fantasy game writing published in the prior calendar year
- Country: United States
- Presented by: Science Fiction and Fantasy Writers Association
- First award: 2019
- Most recent winner: Guillaume Broche & Jennifer Svedberg-Yen for Clair Obscur: Expedition 33
- Website: sfwa.org/nebula-awards/

The Nebula Award for Best Game Writing is one of the Nebula Awards, presented each year by the Science Fiction and Fantasy Writers Association (SFWA) for science fiction or fantasy game writing. The Nebula Awards have been described as one of "the most important of the American science fiction awards" and "the science-fiction and fantasy equivalent" of the Emmy Awards. The Game Writing category is the newest category of the Nebulas, which were originally awarded in 1966 solely for printed fiction. The Nebula Award for Best Game Writing has been awarded annually since 2019. The drive to create the Game Writing category was promoted by then SFWA president Cat Rambo after game writers were made eligible for SFWA membership in 2016. According to a statement by SFWA when the category was announced in 2018, it was added to reflect how changes in technology had expanded the media used for science fiction and fantasy storytelling.

To be eligible for Nebula Award consideration, a work must be published in English in the United States. Works published in English elsewhere in the world are also eligible provided they are released on either a website or in an electronic edition. A game is considered by the organization to be "an interactive or playable story-driven work which conveys narrative, character, or story background". Works in this category have no set word count and must have at least one credited writer.

Nebula Award nominees and winners are chosen by members of the SFWA, though the game writers do not need to be members. Works are nominated each year by members in a period around December 15 through January 31, and the six works that receive the most nominations then form the final ballot, with additional nominees possible in the case of ties. Soon after, members are given a month to vote on the ballot, and the final results are presented at the Nebula Awards ceremony in May. Writers are not permitted to nominate their own works, and ties in the final vote are broken, if possible, by the number of nominations the works received.

During the 8 nomination years, 47 games by 132 writers have been nominated. These have primarily been video games, but also include eight books for role-playing game systems and an interactive film. The first year's award was won by Charlie Brooker for the interactive film Black Mirror: Bandersnatch; the second year's award was won by a team of nine writers led by Leonard Boyarsky for the video game The Outer Worlds; the third year's award was won by Greg Kasavin for the video game Hades; the fourth year's award by a team of six writers for the role-playing game Thirsty Sword Lesbians; the fifth year's award by Hidetaka Miyazaki and George R. R. Martin for the video game Elden Ring; the sixth year by a team of 16 writers led by Adam Smith for the video game Baldur's Gate 3; and the seventh year by a team of writers led by Stewart C. Baker for the interactive fiction game A Death In Hyperspace. Eleven writers have been nominated more than once, with Kate Heartfield, and Natalia Theodoridou having three nominations each. Interactive fiction developer Choice of Games has had the most games nominated with a total of ten over seven years.

== Winners and nominees ==
SFWA currently identifies the awards by the year of publication, that is, the year prior to the year in which the award is given. Entries with a yellow background and an asterisk (*) next to the writer's name have won the award; the other entries are the other nominees on the shortlist.

* Winners and joint winners

Winners and nominees
Year	Writer(s)	Game	Developer	Ref.
2018	Charlie Brooker*	Black Mirror: Bandersnatch	House of Tomorrow	
2018	Charlie Brooker*	Black Mirror: Bandersnatch	Netflix	
2018	Matt Sophos	God of War	Santa Monica Studio	
2018	Richard Zangrande Gaubert	God of War	Santa Monica Studio	
2018	Cory Barlog	God of War	Santa Monica Studio	
2018	M. Darusha Wehm	The Martian Job	Choice of Games	
2018	Natalia Theodoridou	Rent-A-Vice	Choice of Games	
2018	Kate Heartfield	The Road to Canterbury	Choice of Games	
2019	Leonard Boyarsky*	The Outer Worlds	Obsidian Entertainment	
2019	Kate Dollarhyde*	The Outer Worlds	Obsidian Entertainment	
2019	Paul Kirsch*	The Outer Worlds	Obsidian Entertainment	
2019	Chris L'Etoile*	The Outer Worlds	Obsidian Entertainment	
2019	Daniel McPhee*	The Outer Worlds	Obsidian Entertainment	
2019	Carrie Patel*	The Outer Worlds	Obsidian Entertainment	
2019	Nitai Poddar*	The Outer Worlds	Obsidian Entertainment	
2019	Marc Soskin*	The Outer Worlds	Obsidian Entertainment	
2019	Megan Starks*	The Outer Worlds	Obsidian Entertainment	
2019	Kelsey Beachum	Outer Wilds	Mobius Digital	
2019	Kate Heartfield	The Magician's Workshop	Choice of Games	
2019	Robert Kurvitz	Disco Elysium	ZA/UM	
2019	Elsa Sjunneson-Henry	Fate Accessibility Toolkit	Evil Hat Productions	
2020	Greg Kasavin*	Hades	Supergiant Games	
2020	Stephen Bell	Blaseball	The Game Band	
2020	Joel A. Clark	Blaseball	The Game Band	
2020	Sam Rosenthal	Blaseball	The Game Band	
2020	Jake Elliot	Kentucky Route Zero	Cardboard Computer	
2020	Phoebe Barton	The Luminous Underground	Choice of Games	
2020	Sam Kabo Ashwell	Scents & Semiosis	Sam Kabo Ashwell	
2020	Cat Manning	Scents & Semiosis	Sam Kabo Ashwell	
2020	Yoon Ha Lee	Scents & Semiosis	Sam Kabo Ashwell	
2020	Caleb Wilson	Scents & Semiosis	Sam Kabo Ashwell	
2020	Nicolas Guerin	Spiritfarer	Thunder Lotus Games	
2020	Maxim Monast	Spiritfarer	Thunder Lotus Games	
2020	Alex Tommi	Spiritfarer	Thunder Lotus Games	
2021	April Kit Walsh*	Thirsty Sword Lesbians	Evil Hat Productions	
2021	Whitney Delagio*	Thirsty Sword Lesbians	Evil Hat Productions	
2021	Dominique Dickey*	Thirsty Sword Lesbians	Evil Hat Productions	
2021	Jonaya Kemper*	Thirsty Sword Lesbians	Evil Hat Productions	
2021	Alexis Sara*	Thirsty Sword Lesbians	Evil Hat Productions	
2021	Rae Nedjadi*	Thirsty Sword Lesbians	Evil Hat Productions	
2021	Connor Alexander	Coyote and Crow	Coyote & Crow	
2021	William McKay	Coyote and Crow	Coyote & Crow	
2021	Weyodi Oldbear	Coyote and Crow	Coyote & Crow	
2021	Derek Pounds	Coyote and Crow	Coyote & Crow	
2021	Nico Albert	Coyote and Crow	Coyote & Crow	
2021	Riana Elliott	Coyote and Crow	Coyote & Crow	
2021	Diogo Nogueira	Coyote and Crow	Coyote & Crow	
2021	William Thompson	Coyote and Crow	Coyote & Crow	
2021	Balogun Ojetade	Granma's Hand	Roaring Lion Productions	
2021	Jay Dragon	Wanderhome	Possum Creek Games	
2021	Nate Austin	Wildermyth	Worldwalker Games	
2021	Anne Austin	Wildermyth	Worldwalker Games	
2021	Douglas Austin	Wildermyth	Worldwalker Games	
2022	Hidetaka Miyazaki*	Elden Ring	FromSoftware	
2022	George R. R. Martin*	Elden Ring	FromSoftware	
2022	Ben McCaw	Horizon Forbidden West	Guerrilla Games	
2022	Annie Kitain	Horizon Forbidden West	Guerrilla Games	
2022	Ajit George	Journeys through the Radiant Citadel	Wizards of the Coast	
2022	F. Wesley Schneider	Journeys through the Radiant Citadel	Wizards of the Coast	
2022	Justice Ramin Arman	Journeys through the Radiant Citadel	Wizards of the Coast	
2022	Dominique Dickey	Journeys through the Radiant Citadel	Wizards of the Coast	
2022	Basheer Ghouse	Journeys through the Radiant Citadel	Wizards of the Coast	
2022	Alastor Guzman	Journeys through the Radiant Citadel	Wizards of the Coast	
2022	D. Fox Harrell	Journeys through the Radiant Citadel	Wizards of the Coast	
2022	T.K. Johnson	Journeys through the Radiant Citadel	Wizards of the Coast	
2022	Felice Tzehuei Kuan	Journeys through the Radiant Citadel	Wizards of the Coast	
2022	Surena Marie	Journeys through the Radiant Citadel	Wizards of the Coast	
2022	Mimi Mondal	Journeys through the Radiant Citadel	Wizards of the Coast	
2022	Mario Ortegón	Journeys through the Radiant Citadel	Wizards of the Coast	
2022	Miyuki Jane Pinckard	Journeys through the Radiant Citadel	Wizards of the Coast	
2022	Pam Punzalan	Journeys through the Radiant Citadel	Wizards of the Coast	
2022	Erin Roberts	Journeys through the Radiant Citadel	Wizards of the Coast	
2022	Stephanie Yoon	Journeys through the Radiant Citadel	Wizards of the Coast	
2022	Terry H. Romero	Journeys through the Radiant Citadel	Wizards of the Coast	
2022	Kate Dollarhyde	Pentiment	Obsidian Entertainment	
2022	Zoe Franznick	Pentiment	Obsidian Entertainment	
2022	Märten Rattasepp	Pentiment	Obsidian Entertainment	
2022	Josh Sawyer	Pentiment	Obsidian Entertainment	
2022	Steven Lerner	Stray	BlueTwelve Studio	
2022	Vivien Mermet-Guyenet	Stray	BlueTwelve Studio	
2022	Colas Koola	Stray	BlueTwelve Studio	
2022	Natalia Theodoridou	Vampire: The Masquerade — Sins of the Sires	Choice of Games	
2023	Adam Smith*	Baldur's Gate 3	Larian Studios	
2023	Adrienne Law*	Baldur's Gate 3	Larian Studios	
2023	Baudelaire Welch*	Baldur's Gate 3	Larian Studios	
2023	Chrystal Ding*	Baldur's Gate 3	Larian Studios	
2023	Ella McConnell*	Baldur's Gate 3	Larian Studios	
2023	Ine Van Hamme*	Baldur's Gate 3	Larian Studios	
2023	Jan Van Dosselaer*	Baldur's Gate 3	Larian Studios	
2023	John Corcoran*	Baldur's Gate 3	Larian Studios	
2023	Kevin VanOrd*	Baldur's Gate 3	Larian Studios	
2023	Lawrence Schick*	Baldur's Gate 3	Larian Studios	
2023	Martin Docherty*	Baldur's Gate 3	Larian Studios	
2023	Rachel Quirke*	Baldur's Gate 3	Larian Studios	
2023	Ruairí Moore*	Baldur's Gate 3	Larian Studios	
2023	Sarah Baylus*	Baldur's Gate 3	Larian Studios	
2023	Stephen Rooney*	Baldur's Gate 3	Larian Studios	
2023	Swen Vincke*	Baldur's Gate 3	Larian Studios	
2023	Stewart C. Baker	The Bread Must Rise	Choice of Games	
2023	James Beamon	The Bread Must Rise	Choice of Games	
2023	Sam Lake	Alan Wake II	Remedy Entertainment, Epic Games Publishing	
2023	Clay Murphy	Alan Wake II	Remedy Entertainment, Epic Games Publishing	
2023	Tyler Burton Smith	Alan Wake II	Remedy Entertainment, Epic Games Publishing	
2023	Sinikka Annala	Alan Wake II	Remedy Entertainment, Epic Games Publishing	
2023	Yoon Ha Lee	Ninefox Gambit: Machineries of Empire Roleplaying Game	Android Press	
2023	Marie Brennan	Ninefox Gambit: Machineries of Empire Roleplaying Game	Android Press	
2023	Joel Mason	Dredge	Black Salt Games, Team17	
2023	Julien Moya	Chants of Sennaar	Rundisc, Focus Entertainment	
2023	Thomas Panuel	Chants of Sennaar	Rundisc, Focus Entertainment	
2024	Stewart C. Baker*	A Death in Hyperspace	Infomancy.net	
2024	Phoebe Barton*	A Death in Hyperspace	Infomancy.net	
2024	James Beamon*	A Death in Hyperspace	Infomancy.net	
2024	Kate Heartfield*	A Death in Hyperspace	Infomancy.net	
2024	Isabel J. Kim*	A Death in Hyperspace	Infomancy.net	
2024	Sara S. Messenger*	A Death in Hyperspace	Infomancy.net	
2024	Naca Rat*	A Death in Hyperspace	Infomancy.net	
2024	Natalia Theodoridou*	A Death in Hyperspace	Infomancy.net	
2024	M. Darusha Wehm*	A Death in Hyperspace	Infomancy.net	
2024	Merc Fenn Wolfmoor*	A Death in Hyperspace	Infomancy.net	
2024	Remy Siu	1000xResist	Fellow Traveller Games	
2024	Pink Li	1000xResist	Fellow Traveller Games	
2024	Conor Wylie	1000xResist	Fellow Traveller Games	
2024	Hidetaka Miyazaki	Elden Ring Shadow of the Erdtree	From Software	
2024	Benjamin Rosenbaum	The Ghost and the Golem	Choice of Games	
2024	Karrie Shao	Pacific Drive	Ironwood Studios	
2024	Paul Dean	Pacific Drive	Ironwood Studios	
2024	Natalia Theodoridou	Restore, Reflect, Retry	Choice of Games	
2024	Tony Howard-Arias	Slay the Princess — The Pristine Cut	Black Tabby Games	
2024	Abby Howard	Slay the Princess — The Pristine Cut	Black Tabby Games	
2024	Jay Dragon	Yazeba's Bed & Breakfast	Possum Creek Games	
2024	M. Veselak	Yazeba's Bed & Breakfast	Possum Creek Games	
2024	Mercedes Acosta	Yazeba's Bed & Breakfast	Possum Creek Games	
2024	Lillie J. Harris	Yazeba's Bed & Breakfast	Possum Creek Games	
2025	Guillaume Broche*	Clair Obscur: Expedition 33	Sandfall Interactive	
2025	Jennifer Svedberg-Yen*	Clair Obscur: Expedition 33	Sandfall Interactive	
2025	Tonda Ros*	Blue Prince	Dogubomb	
2025	Ashley Jeffalone	Dispatch	AdHoc Studio	
2025	Suzee Matson	Dispatch	AdHoc Studio	
2025	Chris Rebbert	Dispatch	AdHoc Studio	
2025	Chad Rhiness	Dispatch	AdHoc Studio	
2025	Pierre Shorette	Dispatch	AdHoc Studio	
2025	Greg Kasavin	Hades II	Supergiant Games	
2025	Ari Gibson	Hollow Knight: Silksong	Team Cherry	
2025	William Pellen	Hollow Knight: Silksong	Team Cherry	
2025	Stewart C. Baker	Spire, Surge, and Sea	Choice of Games	

== See also ==
- Hugo Award for Best Game or Interactive Work
