= S. Andrew Swann =

American novelist (born 1966)

- Born: Steven Swiniarski; September 1, 1966 (age 60); Cleveland, Ohio, United States
- Occupation: Author
- Writing career
- Language: English
- Genre: Science fiction
- Website: sandrewswann.com

Steven Swiniarski (born September 1, 1966), known online as and publishing under the pen name S. Andrew Swann (alternately S. A. Swann, S. A. Swiniarski, and Steven Krane), is an American science fiction and fantasy author living in Solon, Ohio, a suburb of Cleveland, where much of his fiction is set. His works have been published by DAW Books and by Ballantine Spectra, a division of Random House.

== Books ==
- The Moreau Quartet (four books; 3 omnibus editions)
  - Forests of the Night (DAW Books Inc., 1993)
  - Emperors of the Twilight (DAW Books Inc., 1994)
  - Specters of the Dawn (DAW Books Inc., 1994)
  - Fearful Symmetries (DAW Books Inc., 1999)
    - The Moreau Omnibus (DAW Books Inc., 2003)
    - The Moreau Quartet Volume One (DAW Books Inc., 2015)
    - The Moreau Quartet Volume Two (DAW Books Inc., October 6, 2015)
- The Hostile Takeover Trilogy (three books; 1 omnibus edition)
  - Profiteer (DAW Books Inc., 1995)
  - Partisan (DAW Books Inc., 1995)
  - Revolutionary (DAW Books Inc., 1996)
    - The Hostile Takeover Trilogy (DAW Books Inc., 2004)
- Apotheosis Trilogy (three books)
  - Prophets (DAW Books Inc., 2009)
  - Heretics (DAW Books Inc., 2010)
  - Messiah (DAW Books Inc., 2011)
- The Cleveland Portal Series (two books; 1 omnibus edition)
  - Dragons of the Cuyahoga (DAW Books Inc., 2001)
  - Dwarves of Whiskey Island (DAW Books Inc., 2005)
    - Dragons & Dwarves (DAW Books Inc., 2009)
- The Wolf Series (two books)
  - Wolfbreed (Spectra, 2009)
  - Wolf's Cross (Spectra, 2010)
- The Dragon* series (three books)
  - Dragon•Princess (DAW Books Inc., 2014)
  - Dragon•Thief (DAW Books Inc., 2015)
  - Dragon•Wizard (DAW Books Inc., 2016)
- Standalones (three books)
  - God's Dice (DAW Books Inc., 1997)
  - Zimmerman's Algorithm (DAW Books Inc., 2000)
  - Broken Crescent (DAW Books Inc., 2004)

== Writing as S. A. Swiniarski (two books, 1 omnibus edition) ==
- Raven (DAW Books Inc., 1996)
- The Flesh, the Blood, & the Fire (DAW Books Inc., 1998)
  - Blood & Rust (DAW Books Inc., 2007)

== Writing as Steven Krane (three books) ==
- Teek (DAW Books Inc., 1999)
- The Omega Game (DAW Books Inc., 2000)
- Stranger Inside (DAW Books Inc., 2003)

== Interactive fiction ==
He has also published interactive novels.

- Welcome to Moreytown (Choice of Games, 2017)
- Sword of the Slayer (Choice of Games, 2019)

== Collaborative fiction ==
From 2011 to 2014, Swann contributed 23 articles to the SCP Foundation horror writing project. These are short horror stories with an academic format, released under a Creative Commons license, and are freely available online. They are listed below using SCP's article numbering, which is not strictly chronological.

- SCP-001; S Andrew Swann's Proposal (2011)
- SCP-286 The Brothers' Game (2012)
- SCP-319 A Curious Device (2013)
- SCP-435 He-Who-Made-Dark (2011)
- SCP-511 Basement Cat (2011)
- SCP-635 Medieval Bootstrap Program (2011)
- SCP-687 NOIR (2011)
- SCP-688 Hole Dwellers (2012)
- SCP-719 Light-Bringer (2012)
- SCP-873 Russian Crystal Ball (2012)
- SCP-1123 Atrocity Skull (2012)
- SCP-1127 A Film Festival (2012)
- SCP-1257 Agent Danny of the SCP (2013)
- SCP-1666 The Devil's Music (2011)
- SCP-1736 Voice of the Light (2013)
- SCP-1800 The Minotaur (2012)
- SCP-1801 Sharing Sickness (2012)
- SCP-1803 The Collage (2012)
- SCP-1804 Underwood #5 (2012)
- SCP-1805 A Real Doll (2012)
- SCP-1806 Shadow Sculpture (2012)
- SCP-1966 Sentient Body Scanner (2012)
- SCP-2031 Ant Farm (2014)

== See also ==
- Libertarian science fiction
- Anarcho-capitalist literature
