= Evan J. Peterson =

American author, poet, and educator

- Born: Evan Peterson; Miami, Florida, U.S.
- Education: Florida State University (BA); Florida State University (MFA)
- Occupations: Novelist; game writer; poet; university professor
- Writing career
- Language: English
- Genres: Fantasy; horror; memoir; humor
- Notable works: The PrEP Diaries; Better Living Through Alchemy
- Notable awards: Small Spec Book Award (Fantasy Novel)
- Website: evanjpeterson.com

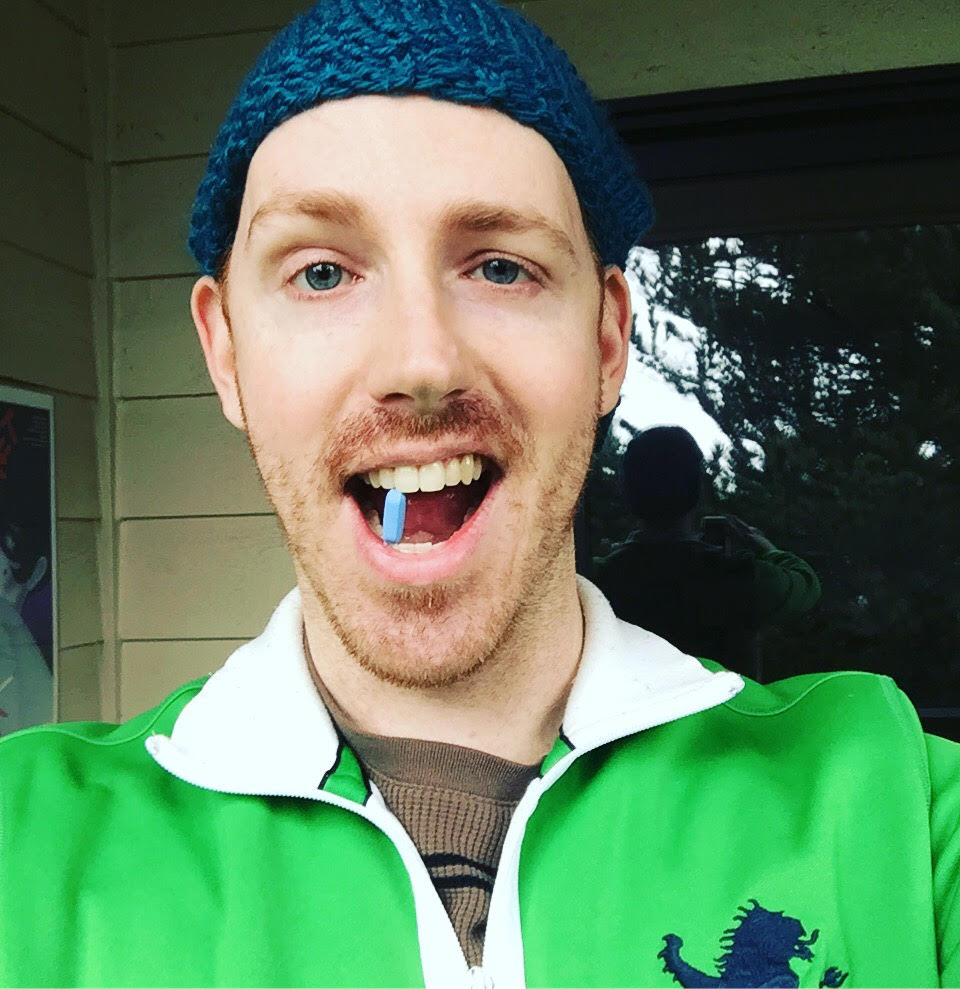
Author Evan J. Peterson takes a selfie with the PrEP (pre-exposure prophylaxis) pill, Truvada.

Evan J. Peterson (sometimes called Evan Peterson) is an American author, poet, game writer, and educator. His debut novel, Better Living Through Alchemy (2024), won the Small Spec Book Award for Fantasy Novel. He is a graduate of the 2015 Clarion West writing workshop.

Peterson has been referred to as "a Swiss Army Knife of writers" due to his publication of non-fiction, poems, short horror and science fiction stories, interactive fiction and games, and full-length books. He teaches writing and emphasizes that poetry should be performed. His performances have been characterized as "high-art concept-driven" and outrageous. A reviewer for The New York Times named Peterson as being among trendy writers creating apocalypse fiction featuring zombies. Peterson's poetry often features movie monsters and characters inspired by the final girl trope. Peterson's multidenominational religious background including Jewish, Christian, and Native American faith has influenced his poetry. Peterson was once editor-in-chief of Minor Arcana Press.

Peterson has been sought for comments on HIV issues and PrEP (pre-exposure prophylaxis), LGBT themes in comics, weird fiction, and The Rocky Horror Picture Show.

== Awards and honors ==
| Year | Title | Award | Category | Result | Ref |
|---|---|---|---|---|---|
| 2024 | Better Living Through Alchemy | Endeavour Award | Fantasy Novel | Finalist | |
| 2025 | Better Living Through Alchemy | Small Spec Book Award | Fantasy Novel | Won | |
| 2014 | Ghosts in Gaslight. Monsters in Steam. Gay City: Volume 5 | Lambda Literary Award | LGBTQ Anthology | Finalist | |

Peterson is the first author to win the Small Spec Book Award for Fantasy Novel.

== Nonfiction ==
In 2017, Peterson released the nonfiction book The PrEP Diaries: A Safe(r) Sex Memoir, published by Lethe Press. The book discusses the drug Truvada, the cultural impact of HIV, and controversial conversations about HIV prevention and safe sex. One reviewer described the book as “an accessible introduction to a complex but unquestionably important moment in our cultural relationship with HIV/AIDS.” In addition to discussing the specifics of pre-exposure prophylaxis with Truvada, the book also discusses “self-care, sex-positivity, and taking control of your own health.”

The Bushwick Book Club Seattle presented a showcase of original music inspired by the book on January 21, 2018.

== Interactive Fiction and Games ==
In 2019, Peterson released the interactive fiction game Drag Star!, published in partnership with Choice of Games. The game was added to the Museum of Pop Culture as part of the exhibit Indie Game Revolution.

Peterson also contributed narrative design to the Lovecraftian horror adventure game The Road to Innsmouth and the escape room Mystery at Innsmouth, both set in the mythos of Arkham Horror: The Card Game produced by Fantasy Flight Games. Both projects were created by Hourglass Escapes and set in the fictional Cthulhu Mythos town of Innsmouth, Massachusetts.

In 2026, Peterson released the interactive fiction game Posthuman: Guardians vs PSION, published in partnership with Choice of Games. The game is described as "an interactive superhero novel."

== Novels ==
Peterson's 2024 debut novel, Better Living Through Alchemy, was awarded Best Fantasy Novel by the Small Speculative Book Awards and was a finalist for the 2024 Endeavour Award.

The story follows a private detective, Kelly Mun, with a psychic sense of smell in an "occult detective fiction-noir fiction" Seattle. Weird fiction editor Ann VanderMeer called the book "an exceptional story filled with remarkable characters."

== Selected works ==
- Kovar, Vincent; Peterson, Evan J. (2013). Ghosts in Gaslight, Monsters in Steam: Gay City 5 (1st ed.). Seattle, WA: Gay City Health Project. ISBN 978-1489580146.
- Peterson, Evan J. (October 2015). "Putting It All the Way In: Naked Lunch and the Body Horror of William S. Burroughs". In Wagner, Wendy N. (ed.). Queers Destroy Horror. Nightmare Magazine. ISBN 978-1517320089.
- Peterson, Evan J. (2017). The PrEP Diaries: A Safe(r) Sex Memoir. Amherst: Lethe Press. ISBN 978-1590215791.
- Peterson, Evan J. "Drag Star!". Choice of Games.
- Peterson, Evan J. (2024). Better Living Through Alchemy. Seattle: Broken Eye Books. ISBN 978-1940372730.
