= Why Don't We Just Kill the Kid In the Omelas Hole =

2024 short story by Isabel J. Kim

"Why Don't We Just Kill the Kid In the Omelas Hole" is a 2024 science fiction short story by Isabel J. Kim, revisiting Ursula K. Le Guin's 1973 "The Ones Who Walk Away from Omelas". It was first published in Clarkesworld.

== Synopsis ==
The story explores the ramifications of the repeated murder and replacement of the "load-bearing suffering child" by people who object to the Omelas system. The murderer of the fourth child is caught and reveals in his interrogation that he is an accelerationist trying to hurry the system towards collapse. The people of Omelas continue to select new load-bearing children and they continue to be murdered, calling into question the efficacy of the system. The narrator describes how visitors to Omelas are now thankful that they do not live in such a horrible place, and that they know it exists.

== Reception ==
"Why Don't We Just Kill the Kid In the Omelas Hole" won the 2024 BSFA Award for Best Short Fiction, the 2024 Nebula Award for Best Short Story, and the 2025 Locus Award for Best Short Story. It was a finalist for the 2025 Hugo Award for Best Short Story and the 2025 Theodore Sturgeon Award.

It was selected for inclusion in the 2025 edition of The Best American Science Fiction and Fantasy.

== See also ==
- Mere addition paradox
- Negative utilitarianism
