= Vampire: The Masquerade (Choice of Games) =

Video game franchise

- Promotional art, featuring (left to right) Out for Blood, Parliament of Knives, and Night Road
- Developer: Choice of Games
- Publisher: Choice of Games
- Writers: Kyle Marquis (Night Road); Jim Dattilo (Out for Blood); Jeffrey Dean (Parliament of Knives); Natalia Theodoridou (Sins of the Sires)
- Series: Vampire: The Masquerade
- Platforms: Android, iOS, Linux, MacOS, Microsoft Windows, web browsers
- Release: Night Road; September 24, 2020; Out for Blood; July 29, 2021; Parliament of Knives; October 28, 2021; Sins of the Sires; March 24, 2022
- Genre: Interactive fiction
- Mode: Single-player

Vampire: The Masquerade is a line of interactive fiction video games based on the tabletop game of the same name, and is part of the World of Darkness series. They are developed by Choice of Games for Android, iOS, Linux, MacOS, Microsoft Windows, and web browsers, and include Night Road (2020) by Kyle Marquis, Out for Blood (2021) by Jim Dattilo, Parliament of Knives (2021) by Jeffrey Dean, and the Sins of the Sires (2022) by Natalia Theodoridou.

The games are text-based, and involve the player creating and customizing a character, and making choices that affect the direction of the plot. In Night Road, the player takes the role of a courier delivering secrets for vampire elders in the Southwestern United States; in Out for Blood, a vampire hunter who protects his town; in Parliament of Knives, a vampire navigating vampire politics following a coup in Ottawa, Canada; and in Sins of the Sires, a vampire in Athens, Greece, where an ancient vampire plans to rule over humans as a god.

Choice of Games approached Paradox Interactive, the owner of the World of Darkness series, to pitch a video game adaptation as they considered the series and its Storyteller System foundation to match up well with Choice of Games' design philosophies of game mechanics used to support rather than dominate stories. The writers differed in how they chose to adapt the tabletop game: Marquis adhered closely to the source material, while Dean adapted game mechanics more loosely.

== Gameplay ==
The player makes choices in text-based gameplay, affecting the direction of the plot.

Vampire: The Masquerade – Night Road, Out for Blood, Parliament of Knives, and Sins of the Sires are text-based interactive fiction video games where the player makes choices that affect the direction of the plot, resulting in one of several endings; these include both main endings and failure states. The player characters are created and customized by the player, including choosing their attributes, gender (non-binary, male, or female), and sexuality (bi, gay, or straight); Sins of the Sires additionally lets the player choose to be asexual, and to choose between androgyny, femininity, and masculinity.

In Night Road, the player uses their vampiric powers ("disciplines") with the goal of staying ahead of pursuers. The protagonist has affinities for different disciplines depending on which of the five vampire clans Ventrue, Toreador, Brujah, Gangrel, and Banu Haqim the player chooses to belong to; disciplines include magical, mental, and physical ones. As the player completes jobs, they gain money, which can be used to buy cars with different speed, acceleration, and handling statistics; the player can also tune their car throughout the game.

In Out for Blood, the player can choose to ally with one vampiric side, try to play the sides against each other, or fight against both. Depending on player choices, the protagonist can become a vampire.

In Parliament of Knives, the player has to watch out for other vampires who are trying to gain power; in doing so they can choose to support or betray their character's sire, ally with another vampire faction, work independently, or sabotage local politics.

== Synopsis ==
- Night Road follows an elite Camarilla courier driving across the Southwestern United States to deliver vampire elders' secrets, meeting several vampires of different clan and social status in the process. The courier is based in Tucson, Arizona, and visits cities including Fort Worth, Dallas, and Phoenix, as well as desert ruins and an abandoned research facility used by the vampire clan Tremere in the 1970s. The story has four main endings.
- Out for Blood follows a suburban vampire hunter, who tries to protect their town from the hundred-year-old vampire Chastain, and gets drawn into a feud between her and younger vampires.
- Parliament of Knives follows a vampire in Ottawa, Canada following a coup that has destabilized local vampire politics: the Ottawa Camarilla's prince is missing, and his second-in-command, the protagonist's sire, is suspected.
- Sins of the Sires follows a vampire in Athens, Greece, where the ancient vampire Aristovoros plans to subjugate humans and rule over them as a god.

== Development ==
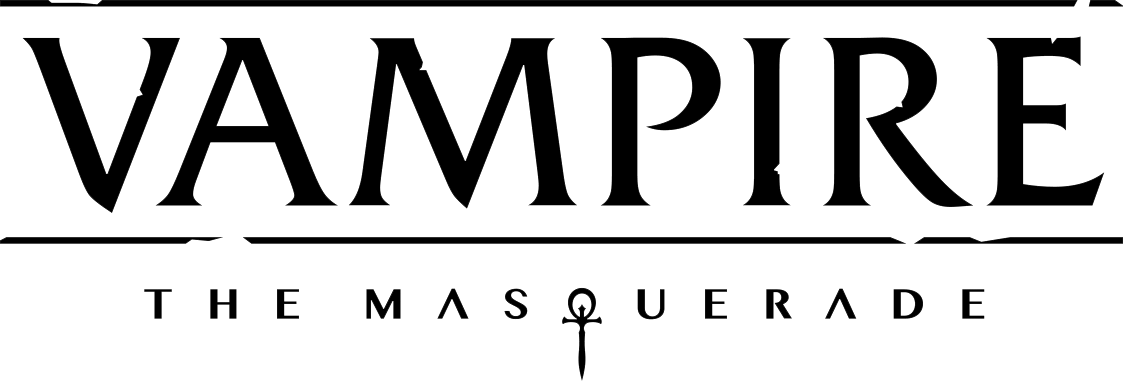
The games are based on the fifth edition of the tabletop role-playing game Vampire: The Masquerade.

The games are developed by Choice of Games in collaboration with Paradox Interactive, the owner of the World of Darkness series, and are based on the fifth edition of the tabletop role-playing game Vampire: The Masquerade. They are edited by Jason Stevan Hill, and are written by Kyle Marquis (Night Road), Jim Dattilo (Out for Blood), Jeffrey Dean (Parliament of Knives), and Natalia Theodoridou (Sins of the Sires). The project, one of many World of Darkness video game adaptations at the time, began after Paradox Interactive brought management of the series in-house and expressed a desire to license it out, after which Hill reached out to them; he considered the tabletop games and the Storyteller System they are built upon to match up with Choice of Games' design philosophy of stories enhanced by rather than dominated by mechanics, with decisions impacting outcomes and where even failure leads to good stories.

In the beginning of the partnership, Marquis pitched a lot of different games, including a hardboiled Mummy: The Resurrection adaptation where the player investigates serial killers by assuming the form of their favored type of victims, and a few Vampire: The Masquerade ideas including one where the player controls an elder vampire defending their backwoods domain in Maine and one about an occult treasure hunter; Paradox liked the courier idea that was eventually used for Night Road, and adapted its core concept for their Vampire: The Masquerade web series Vein Pursuit.

Marquis described Paradox as very accepting of eccentricities in his story pitches; he ended up playing the story "pretty straight" when the player is in their base of operations, but getting "weird" with it in the desert, where vampires do not need to worry as much about being found out. Paradox would also answer questions about the setting, such as whether there was anything to keep in mind while writing about a specific location or whether there was anything in the way of picking up story threads from early Vampire: The Masquerade material.

=== Production ===
Producing the games within the given time constraints was a challenge, as the developers had to handle not only game design and writing a story, but also managing World of Darkness lore. In adapting the tabletop game to an interactive fiction game format, the writers took different approaches: Marquis adhered closely to the tabletop game's mechanics, intending to replicate the experience of playing the tabletop game rather than a Choose Your Own Adventure book, including using the tabletop game system of dots on the Night Road character statistics page; Dattilo, meanwhile, used a more loose interpretation of the mechanics for Out for Blood. In either case, some compromises had to be done for game balance, for example with the vampire clan banes, whose effects had to be tweaked while ensuring they still feel substantial; Marquis also noted that he was unable to include two vampire clans from the tabletop game: Nosferatu, as their appearance would make them unable to work as couriers without revealing themselves as vampires, and Malkavian, as it would have required all dialogue in the game to be rewritten for them in "delusion speak", as had been done in the earlier game Vampire: The Masquerade – Bloodlines. The design of Night Road was in part influenced by the adventure game Sam & Max Hit the Road, with a forward momentum together with a sense of being able to go wherever one wants.

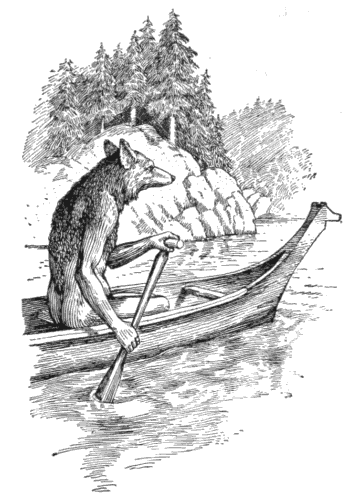
Night Road's influences include the mythological Coyote.

Marquis enjoyed writing a World of Darkness game set in the present, due to how the world has changed since the World of Darkness tabletop games were originally published in the 1990s. One of the first things he did when beginning development was to write a list of things he would not include in the story, due to editorial request, personal disinterest, or due to how they would not work in a courier story. He also looked through developer notes for other World of Darkness material to avoid overlap with other stories in the series; he specifically wanted to avoid including "ancient tomb" tropes, considering this something that had never been done better than the Ankaran sarcophagus in Bloodlines, and therefore not wanting to compete with it. Instead, he opted for writing a story about "mad science", forgotten experiments, and the eeriness of unexplained disappearances. He cited novels including Jack Kerouac's On the Road, Hunter S. Thompson's Fear and Loathing in Las Vegas, and Richard Kadrey's Sandman Slim series, as influences. He also took inspiration from mythology, with the shapeshifter Coyote serving as inspiration for a polymorphic Gangrel vampire. A challenge for Marquis was to balance horror with the World of Darkness tabletop games' systematized setting; he tried to counter this by drawing from more obscure parts of the setting, to populate the game's world with "the unknown" – things that belong to the setting but are less categorized than the Camarilla vampires.

=== Release ===
The first three games were announced in April 2020, and were published by Choice of Games through 2020–2021 for Android, iOS, Linux, MacOS, Microsoft Windows, and web browsers: Night Road was released on September 24, 2020, Out for Blood on July 29, 2021, and Parliament of Knives on October 28, 2021. In 2020, Hill said that it was possible that Choice of Game would develop further World of Darkness games; Sins of the Sires was announced in November 2021 for release in early 2022.

"Usurpers and Outcasts", a piece of downloadable content for Night Road that adds the option to play as a Tremere or Caitiff vampire, was released alongside the main game on September 24, 2020.

== Reception ==
TouchArcade was excited for the games, considering World of Darkness a great space for storytelling and Choice of Games a developer with a good track record for narrative-focused video games. They liked the games' premises, and appreciated Parliament of Knives' political theme, as one of their favorite aspects of Vampire: The Masquerade. Den of Geek, too, looked forward to them, following Choice of Games' earlier vampire-themed game series Choice of the Vampire, and encouraged readers to play it while waiting for Night Road. Comic Book Resources considered the car-related gameplay mechanics in Night Road, such as the ability to unlock different types of cars and tuning them, among the most appealing mechanics of the game.

Night Road won Best Game at the 2020 XYZZY Awards for interactive fiction. Sins of the Sires was nominated for the Nebula Award for Best Game Writing in March 2023.
