= Red Thunder (novel) =

2003 novel by John Varley

- First edition cover Cover art by Bob Warner
- Author: John Varley
- Genre: Science fiction
- Publisher: Ace Books
- Publication date: 2003
- ISBN: 0-441-01015-6

Red Thunder is a 2003 science fiction novel by American writer John Varley. The novel is a homage to the juvenile science fiction novels written by Robert A. Heinlein.

In 2004, Red Thunder won the Endeavour Award and was nominated for the Campbell Award.

Varley has written three sequels, Red Lightning (2006), Rolling Thunder (2008) and Dark Lightning (2014). The events of the books in the series are set approximately twenty years apart. In an interview on the Republibot website in 2009, he mentioned that "Dark Lightning" would be the final book in the series.

== Synopsis ==
The novel begins in Florida in the near future against the backdrop of a geopolitical rivalry between the United States and China. Both countries are competing to send their missions to Mars first, although it is clear the Chinese will arrive sooner. The protagonist is Manny Garcia, a teenager who is fascinated by space flight. He, along with his girlfriend Kelly, his best friend Dak, and Dak's girlfriend Alicia, are partying on the beach one night and almost run over a man who has passed out from drinking. The man is Travis Broussard, a former astronaut who was forced to retire in disgrace. Travis lives with his cousin Jubal, who is mentally deficient in some ways, but is also a scientific genius.

Jubal has invented a device called the "squeezer", a spherical impenetrable silver force field that can be formed or have its size changed with no energy cost. The squeezer can compress whatever matter is within it to an arbitrarily small volume and then vent the resulting plasma/energy in a controlled way. Travis and the teenagers realize while the device has numerous beneficial uses, it is also a dangerous weapon. They use the squeezers to power a spaceship, and plan to arrive at Mars ahead of the slower traveling American and Chinese missions already in transit and be available to help should Jubal's prediction of problems with the American mission prove true.

They succeed in building their spaceship called Red Thunder which they make using railroad tank cars and take off. The four teenagers form the crew with Travis as pilot. They arrive at Mars a day ahead of the Chinese mission. They learn from the Chinese that the American mission was stranded by an accident (their VASIMR drive exploded). Red Thunder is able to locate and rescue the surviving crew members during their return to Earth.

When they arrive back on Earth, they are welcomed as heroes. They use the publicity of their trip to ensure that no nation or individual controls the squeezer technology, and help form a separate non-political organization to control and disseminate the new technology. With this technology, people are able to eliminate waste dumps and pollution, and begin a new era of space travel throughout the Solar System and beyond.
