= Fortean Bureau =

The Fortean Bureau was an online magazine published from Laramie, Wyoming, between 2002–06 and edited by Jeremy and Sarah Tolbert. It was published monthly from July 2002 to December 2004, then quarterly in 2005, with the final issue published in April 2006. There was a total of 33 issues.

The Fortean Bureau focused on publishing speculative Fortean fiction and literary weird fiction. Notable authors featured include Jay Lake, Bruce Boston, Cory Doctorow, Lavie Tidhar, Tobias S. Buckell and Nick Mamatas (who also contributed a personal column in the last few issues).
