= Mainspring (novel) =

2007 novel by Jay Lake

- Cover of 2007 First Edition
- Author: Jay Lake
- Cover artist: Stephane Martiniere
- Language: English
- Genre: Science fiction
- Publisher: Tor Books
- Publication date: June 2007
- Publication place: United States
- Media type: Print (Hardbound)
- Pages: 320 pp
- ISBN: 0-7653-1708-7
- OCLC: 85243813
- Dewey Decimal: 813/.6 22
- LC Class: PS3612.A519 M35 2007
- Followed by: Escapement

Mainspring is the third novel from writer Jay Lake. It is a clockpunk science fiction novel.

This novel is followed by the 2008 sequel Escapement and the 2010 sequel Pinion.

== Plot summary ==
Mainspring is the story of a young clockmaker's apprentice, who is visited by the Archangel Gabriel. He is told that he must take the Key Perilous and rewind the mainspring of the Earth. It is running down, and disaster to the planet will ensue if it's not rewound. From innocence and ignorance to power and self-knowledge, the young man will make the long and perilous journey to the South Polar Axis, to fulfill the commandment of his God.
