= Shimmer Magazine =

Speculative fiction magazine

- Shimmer Vol. 2, Issue 3 cover dated Art 2008
- Editor-in-Chief: Beth Wodzinski
- Categories: speculative fiction
- Frequency: Quarterly
- First issue: October 2005
- Final issue Number: November 2018; 46
- Country: United States
- Language: English
- Website: www.shimmerzine.com

Shimmer Magazine was a quarterly magazine which published speculative fiction, with a focus on material that is dark, humorous or strange. Established in June 2005, Shimmer was published in digest format and PDF and was edited by Beth Wodzinski.

Shimmer featured stories from award-winning authors Jay Lake and Ken Scholes; comic book artist Karl Kesel also contributed artwork. The magazine ceased publication with issue 46 published in November 2018.

== History ==
In mid-April 2005, Beth Wodzinski began having "vague thoughts" about starting an on-line, downloadable zine. While worried that she wouldn't have much time to devote to such a project, she wanted to support authors who wrote the kind of stories she liked, and to reject authors who wrote "alright" instead of "all right." About a month later, Beth came up with the ideal name for her zine: "Shimmer".

Beth then recruited a few on-line friends to help develop the magazine. J. L. Radley, Jon Willesen, and Chris Hansen came on board, and Shimmer moved from its conception phase to its development and business model phase. Rather quickly, it became evident that more help would be needed, and Mary Robinette Kowal joined the Shimmery Staff as Art Director. Beth, Mary Robinette, and J. L. Radley all met online at Orson Scott Card's Hatrack River Writers Workshop forum.

Barely a few weeks into development, a conversation on an online message board for writers precipitated a major discussion among the Shimmery Staff that changed how Shimmer would be delivered to its readers. Shimmer, Beth decided, would be a printed magazine. Though risky and requiring some more capital than initially planned for, Shimmer debuted as a digest-sized printed magazine with a perfect-bound glossy, color cover. Shimmer has since been well received by readers and critics; and esteemed editor Ellen Datlow (whose interview appears in the Winter 2006 issue) wrote that Shimmer is "worthwhile" in the summary section of 2005 The Year's Best Fantasy and Horror anthology.

== Contributor payment ==
Since August 2012, Shimmer has paid US$0.05/word, considered the minimum professional rate for speculative fiction writing. Contributors to earlier editions were paid lower rates (US$5/piece for the debut issue, Autumn 2005, rising to $10 for the next two issues and to $0.01/word in July 2006).

== Circulation ==
To date, no mention of Shimmer's circulation totals, either print or electronic, appeared on the official website or elsewhere on the internet. There were, however, two "news" posts on the Shimmer site which claimed Shimmer placed fifth on Clarkesworld Books Bestseller List (magazines), one in April and another in June, 2006.

== Other ==
All story and artwork submissions were received electronically via email. The magazine's Submissions Wrangler removed all personally-identifiable information from a manuscript and then forwarded the story to one of its editors, who read the story "blind". This, Shimmer claims in its submission guidelines, allowed for editors to judge whether a story merits acceptance based solely on the story and not which author submitted it. There were other publications which use a similar acceptance and rejection process. All stories that were not accepted received personal rejection letters and feedback from the editor(s).

John Joseph Adams, a.k.a. "The Slush God", assistant editor of Fantasy and Science Fiction, edited the magazine's special Pirate issue in Summer 2007.

One story from each issue was selected for an audio recording, sometimes read by the author who wrote the story.

There is (or was) another Shimmer Magazine published in Australia, with content geared towards women's fashion, but it is unclear if the Australian Shimmer is still in publication; this uncertainty is based on its website, which does not appear to have been updated since 2004.

== The Issues ==
=== Autumn 2005 Vol. 1 Issue 1 ===
==== Stories and Authors ====
- Sour Hands - Kuzhali Manickavel
- Nobody's Fool - Edward Cox
- White Burn - Stephen M. Dare
- Valley of the Shadow (cover) - Dario Ciriello
- Book Review: The Traveler - John Joseph Adams
- An Interrupted Nap - Richard S. Crawford
- Finders Keepers - J. Albert Bell
- The Shoppers - Michael Mathews
- And Death Will Seize the Doctor, Too - Jeremiah Swanson
- A Convocation of Clowns - Mel Cameron

==== Artists & Illustrations ====
- Cover: Act of Love - Sam Tsohonis
- p. 6: Ezhil's mangoes - Mary Robinette Kowal (staff)
- p. 16: Lucy - Chrissy Ellsworth
- p. 23: The Wheels on the Bus - Chrissy Ellsworth
- p. 29: Portrait of Kim - Stephanie Rodriguez
- p. 39: Memories of Edgar - Stephanie Rodriguez
- p. 55: Outside Woolworth's - Mary Robinette Kowal (staff)

=== Winter 2006 Vol. 1 Issue 2 ===
==== Stories and Authors ====
- Action Team-Ups Number Thirty-Seven - Ken Scholes
- Sell Your Soul to the Devil Blues - Tom Pendergrass
- Route Nine - Samantha Henderson
- The Goldsmith - Ian Creasey
- Music in D Minor - Erynn Miles
- Interview with Ellen Datlow
- Neighbor - Jason A.D. MacDonald
- The Persian Box - Gerald Costlow
- One-Leaf-Two - Edo Mor
- The Black Back-Lands (cover) - Jay Lake

==== Artists & Illustrations ====
- Cover: It's Not Easy Being Evil - Chrissy Ellsworth
- p. 8: Action Team-up Number Thirty-Seven - Karl Kesel
- p. 15: Sell Your Soul to the Devil Blues - Stephen R. Stanley
- p. 24: Route Nine - Chrissy Ellsworth
- p. 28: Goldsmith - Mary Robinette Kowal (staff)
- p. 35: The City - Liz Clarke
- p. 59: The Persian Box - Unknown Persian Artist

=== Spring 2006 Vol. 1 Issue 3 ===
==== Stories and Authors ====
- Dog Thinks Ahead - Clifford Royal Johns
- Drevka's Rain - Marina T. Stern
- The Dealer's Hands - Paul Abbamondi
- Melancholix - Joseph Remy
- Litany - John Mantooth
- Book Review: The Draco Tavern - John Joseph Adams
- Rubber Boots, Mr. President - Bruce K. Derksen
- Paper Man - Darby Harn
- A Warrior's Death (cover) - Aliette de Bodard
- The Little Match Girl - Angela Slatter

==== Artists & Illustrations ====
- Cover: Wheel of Six Realms of Rebirth - David Ho
- p. 7: Drevka's Rain - Joy Marchand (staff)
- p. 22: Melancholix - Joseph Remy
- p. 28: Litany - Frank Harper
- p. 34: Electric Man 1 - Paul Guinan
- p. 61: A Warrior's Death - Stephen R. Stanley
- Back cover: The Difference - David Ho

=== Summer 2006 Vol. 1 Issue 4 ===
==== Stories and authors ====
- The Crow's Caw - Amal El-Mohtar
- Oscar's Temple - Stephen L. Moss
- Always Greener - Paul Abbamondi
- Bluebeard (cover) - Angela Slatter
- Interview with Kevin J. Anderson and Rebecca Moesta - Ken Scholes and Jen West
- Gnome Season - Michael Livingston
- On the Edge of the World - Marina T. Stern
- Urban Renewal - Tom Pendergrass
- A Fish Tale - Beverly Jackson

==== Artists and Illustrations ====
- Cover: Little Pearl - Chrissy Ellsworth
- p. 19: Oscar's Temple - Stephen Stanley
- p. 25: Lucy and the Centaur - Chrissy Ellsworth
- p. 33: Breath Like Champagne - Chrissy Ellsworth
- p. 49: Gnome Season - Mary Robinette Kowal (staff)
- p. 63: On the Edge of the World - Sandro Castelli
- Back Cover: Bluebeard - Lucy Ellsworth (sic; presumably Chrissy Ellsworth)

=== Spring 2009 Vol. 1 Issue 10 ===
==== Stories and Authors ====
- "Blue Joe" - Stephanie Burgis
- "The Carnivale of Abandoned Tales" - Caitlyn Paxson
- "A Painter, A Sheep, and a Boa Constrictor" - Nir Yaniv (Translated from the Hebrew by Lavie Tidhar)
- "One for Sorrow" - Shweta Narayan
- "The Bride Price" - Richard S. Crawford
- "Jaguar Woman" - Silvia Moreno-Garcia
- "Firefly Igloo" - Caroline M. Yoachim
- "The Fox and the King's Beard" - Jessica Paige Wick
- "Interview with Cory Doctorow" - Jen West
- "River Water" - Becca De La Rosa
- "What to Do with the Dead" - Claude Lalumière
- "The Spoils of Springfield" - Alex Wilson
- "Counting Down to the End of the Universe" - Sara Genge

== See also ==
- Fantasy magazine
- Horror fiction magazine
- Science fiction magazine
