= Isabel Cañas =

Speculative fiction writer

- Born: Isabel Lachenauer; November 8, 1990 (age 35)
- Occupation: Writer
- Writing career
- Years active: 2022–present
- Genres: Speculative fiction, gothic fiction, historical fiction, supernatural
- Notable work: Vampires of El Norte (2023)

Academic background
- Education: University of St. Andrews (MA); University of Edinburgh (MS); University of Chicago (MA, PhD)
- Thesis: Artūḫı Wept: New Approaches to Reading Emotions in Dānişmendnāme (2022)
- Doctoral advisor: Hakan Karateke
- Website: isabelcanas.com

Isabel Lachenauer (born November 8, 1990) is a speculative fiction writer who publishes under the name Isabel Cañas.

== Early life and education ==
Cañas was homeschooled as a child. She grew up writing Lord of the Rings fanfiction and journaling extensively, while her family moved around and lived in nine different houses. She spent nine years in Orange County, California. She graduated from New Trier High School in Illinois in 2009.

She earned a Master of Arts degree with honors in Arabic and Middle Eastern studies at the University of St Andrews in 2013 and a Master of Science degree in advanced Arabic from the University of Edinburgh in 2014. During her time at St Andrews, she studied abroad at the American University in Cairo in 2011. She earned another master's degree in 2017 and a PhD in Near Eastern Languages and Civilizations in 2022 from the University of Chicago. Her advisor was Hakan Karateke.

In 2018, Cañas was a member of the Clarion West Writers Workshop.

== Writing career ==
Her debut novel, The Hacienda (2022), follows Beatriz, "a young woman who arrives at a cursed estate" and must "deal with the dark forces haunting her new home." The novel was a finalist for the Bram Stoker Award for Best First Novel. In an interview with NPR, Cañas discussed the book's exploration of "colonialism, social status, the syncretism of Catholicism and indigenous practices – and her own fear of darkness."

In 2023, she published her second novel, Vampires of El Norte. Author Gabino Iglesias, writing for NPR, said the novel, "elegantly navigates a multiplicity of genres to deliver an engaging story that cements Cañas as one of the best new voices bridging the gap between romance and speculative fiction". It was nominated for a 2023 Endeavour Award.

Her third novel, The Possession of Alba Díaz, was published in 2025. Jenny Hamilton at Reactor said "Isabel Cañas' wonderfully creepy third novel is another great recent example of Gothic horror... Cañas continues to shine as a leading light in our current renaissance of Gothic fiction."

Her newest book, The House of Gardenias, a YA novel, was released by Dutton Books in September 2026.

== Personal life ==
Cañas has previously lived in Mexico, Scotland, Egypt, Turkey, and New York City. She lives in Seattle, Washington.

== Partial Bibliography ==
=== Novels ===
- The Hacienda (2022)
- Vampires of El Norte (2023)
- The Possession of Alba Díaz (2025)

=== YA Novels ===
- The House of Gardenias (2026)

=== Short stories ===
- "There Are No Monsters on Rancho Buenavista" (2022)
- "All the Things I Know About Ghosts" (2023)
- "The Hand that Feeds", in Something Followed Us Home: Tales of Latiné Horror (2026)
