= Fairwood Press =

American publishing company

- Founded: 2000
- Founder: Patrick and Honna Swenson
- Country of origin: United States
- Headquarters location: Kent, Washington
- Publication types: Books
- Official website: www.fairwoodpress.com

Fairwood Press is an American small-press publishing company, specializing in speculative fiction, poetry, and nonfiction. It was founded by Patrick and Honna Swenson and is currently located in Kent, Washington.

The company has published work by James Van Pelt, Jay Lake, Tom Piccirilli, Kurt R. A. Giambastiani, and Patrick O'Leary. Van Pelt's Flying in the Heart of the Lafayette Escadrille was a finalist at the 2013 Chelsey Award for Best Cover Illustration: Paperback Book. In addition, Fairwood Press published Talebones, a short story magazine that had featured science fiction and dark fantasy. The magazine was discontinued in 2009, though an anthology of stories from the magazines was later released.
