= Choice of Games =

US video game developer

Choice of Games LLC
- Company type: Privately held company
- Industry: Video game industry
- Founded: 2009
- Headquarters: California
- Website: choiceofgames.com

Choice of Games LLC is a video game developer based in California that creates interactive fiction.

They create their games in the custom-made ChoiceScript programming language, which is designed for writing multiple-choice games with a small number of variables.

The company was founded by Dan Fabulich and Adam Strong-Morse in 2009. It has been noted for making games that are accessible to the visually impaired. Its games have been praised for their diverse portrayals of gender and sexuality.

The company also hosts user-submitted games under the Hosted Games label on their site and app store listing in exchange for a share of the profits. In late 2019, the company introduced the romance-focused label Heart's Choice.

== Titles ==
Year	Title	Author(s)	Editor	Word Count	System
2009	Choice of the Dragon	Dan Fabulich and Adam Strong-Morse	Oornery	30,000	PC, Mac OS X, Linux, iOS, Android, Kindle, Web
2010	Choice of Broadsides	Adam Strong-Morse, Heather Albano, and Dan Fabulich		60,000	PC, Mac OS X, Linux, iOS, Android, Kindle, Web
2010	Affairs of the Court: Choice of Romance	Heather Albano and Adam Strong-Morse	Dan Fabulich		PC, Mac OS X, Linux, iOS, Android, Kindle, Web
2010	Choice of the Vampire	Jason Stevan Hill	Oornery and Dan Fabulich	850,000	iOS, Android, Kindle, Web
2011	Affairs of the Court: Choice of Intrigues	Heather Albano and Adam Strong-Morse	Dan Fabulich		PC, Mac OS X, Linux, iOS, Android, Kindle, Web
2012	Choice of Zombies	Heather Albano and Richard Jackson	Oornery and Dan Fabulich	140,000	PC, Mac OS X, Linux, iOS, Android, Kindle, Web
2012	Heroes Rise: The Prodigy	Zachary Sergi	Oornery and Jason Stevan Hill	100,000	PC, Mac OS X, Linux, iOS, Android, Kindle, Web
2012	For Rent: Haunted House	Gavin Inglis	Oornery and Jason Stevan Hill	56,000	iOS, Android, Kindle, Web
2012	Choice of the Star Captain	Dorian Hart	Oornery and Adam Strong-Morse		PC, Mac OS X, Linux, iOS, Android, Kindle, Web
2012	To the City of the Clouds	Catherine Bailey	Oornery and Jason Stevan Hill		iOS, Android, Kindle, Web
2012	The Fleet	Jonathan Valuckas	Oornery and Jason Stevan Hill	102,000	PC, Mac OS X, Linux, iOS, Android, Kindle, Web
2012	Choice of Kung Fu	Alana Joli Abbott	Oornery and Adam Strong-Morse	116,000	PC, Mac OS X, Linux, iOS, Android, Kindle, Web
2013	Treasure Seekers of Lady Luck	Christopher Brendel	Oornery and Adam Strong-Morse	99,000	iOS, Android, Web
2013	Slammed!	Paolo Chikiamco	Oornery and Adam Strong-Morse	250,000	PC, Mac OS X, Linux, iOS, Android, Web
2013	Choice of the Ninja	Katherine Buffington	Oornery and Adam Strong-Morse	185,000	iOS, Android, Web
2013	Choice of the Vampire: The Fall of Memphis	Jason Stevan Hill	Oornery and Dan Fabulich	314,000	iOS, Android, Web
2013	Affairs of the Court: 'Til Death Do Us Part	Heather Albano and Adam Strong-Morse	Oornery and Dan Fabulich		PC, Mac OS X, Linux, iOS, Android, Web
2013	Heroes Rise: The Hero Project	Zachary Sergi	Oornery and Jason Stevan Hill	179,000	PC, Mac OS X, Linux, iOS, Android, Web
2013	The ORPHEUS Ruse	Paul Gresty	Oornery and Jason Stevan Hill	152,000	PC, Mac OS X, Linux, iOS, Android, Web
2013	Showdown at Willow Creek	Alana Joli Abbott	Oornery and Adam Strong-Morse	71,000	iOS, Android, Web
2013	Reckless Space Pirates	Rachel Zakuta	Oornery and Adam Strong-Morse	122,000	PC, Mac OS X, Linux, iOS, Android, Web
2013	Choice of the Deathless	Max Gladstone	Oornery and Adam Strong-Morse	99,000	PC, Mac OS X, Linux, iOS, Android, Web
2014	Choice of the Rock Star	Jonathan Zimmerman	Oornery and Adam Strong-Morse	73,000	iOS, Android, Web
2014	NOLA is Burning	Claudia Starling	Oornery and Jason Stevan Hill	74,000	PC, Mac OS X, Linux, iOS, Android, Web
2014	Neighbourhood Necromancer	Gavin Inglis	Oornery and Jason Stevan Hill	104,000	PC, Mac OS X, Linux, iOS, Android, Web
2014	Mecha Ace	Paul Wang	Oornery and Jason Stevan Hill	238,000	PC, Mac OS X, Linux, iOS, Android, Web
2014	Heroes Rise: HeroFall	Zachary Sergi	Oornery and Jason Stevan Hill	119,000	PC, Mac OS X, Linux, iOS, Android, Web
2014	Yeti's Parole Officer	KT Bryski	Oornery and Rebecca Slitt	68,000	iOS, Android, Web
2014	Thieves' Gambit: The Curse of the Black Cat	Dana Duffield	Oornery and Rebecca Slitt	96,000	PC, Mac OS X, Linux, iOS, Android, Web
2014	Creatures Such As We	Lynnea Glasser	Oornery	118,000	PC, Mac OS X, Linux, iOS, Android, Web
2014	Psy High	Rebecca Slitt	Oornery and Adam Strong-Morse	185,000	PC, Mac OS X, Linux, iOS, Android, Web
2014	Choice of Robots	Kevin Gold	Oornery and Adam Strong-Morse	300,000	PC, Mac OS X, Linux, iOS, Android, Web
2014	The Last Monster Master	Ben Serviss	Oornery and Jason Stevan Hill	250,000	PC, Mac OS X, Linux, iOS, Android, Web
2015	The Hero of Kendrickstone	Paul Wang	Oornery and Jason Stevan Hill	240,000	PC, Mac OS X, Linux, iOS, Android, Web
2015	Choice of the Petal Throne	Danielle Goudeau	Oornery and Adam Strong-Morse	124,000	PC, Mac OS X, Linux, iOS, Android, Web
2015	Hollywood Visionary	Aaron A. Reed	Oornery and Rebecca Slitt	150,000	PC, Mac OS X, Linux, iOS, Android, Web
2015	It's Killing Time	Eric Bonholtzer	Oornery and Jason Stevan Hill	140,000	PC, Mac OS X, Linux, iOS, Android, Web
2015	Champion of the Gods	Jonathan Valuckas	Oornery and Jason Stevan Hill	217,000	PC, Mac OS X, Linux, iOS, Android, Web
2015	VERSUS: The Lost Ones	Zachary Sergi	Oornery and Jason Stevan Hill	123,000	PC, Mac OS X, Linux, iOS, Android, Web
2015	A Wise Use of Time	Jim Dattilo	Oornery and Jason Stevan Hill	260,000	PC, Mac OS X, Linux, iOS, Android, Web
2015	Ratings War	Oornery and Eddy Webb	Jason Stevan Hill	80,000	PC, Mac OS X, Linux, iOS, Android, Web
2015	Deathless: The City’s Thirst	Max Gladstone	Oornery and Adam Strong-Morse	150,000	PC, Mac OS X, Linux, iOS, Android, Web
2015	Diabolical	Nick Aires	Oornery and Rebecca Slitt	130,000	PC, Mac OS X, Linux, iOS, Android, Web
2015	Pendragon Rising	Ian Thomas	Oornery and Rebecca Slitt	112,000	PC, Mac OS X, Linux, iOS, Android, Web
2015	MetaHuman Inc.	Paul Gresty	Oornery and Jason Stevan Hill	260,000	PC, Mac OS X, Linux, iOS, Android, Web
2015	Sixth Grade Detective	Logan Hughes	Oornery and Adam Strong-Morse	109,000	PC, Mac OS X, Linux, iOS, Android, Web
2016	The Daring Mermaid Expedition	Andrea Phillips	Oornery and Rebecca Slitt	71,000	PC, Mac OS X, Linux, iOS, Android, Web
2016	The Hero Project: Redemption Season	Zachary Sergi	Oornery and Jason Stevan Hill	129,000	PC, Mac OS X, Linux, iOS, Android, Web
2016	The Sea Eternal	Lynnea Glasser	Oornery and Jason Stevan Hill	283,000	PC, Mac OS X, Linux, iOS, Android, Web
2016	Choice of the Pirate	Alana Joli Abbott	Oornery and Rebecca Slitt	165,000	PC, Mac OS X, Linux, iOS, Android, Web
2016	Choice of Alexandria	Kevin Gold	Oornery and Adam Strong-Morse	90,000	PC, Mac OS X, Linux, iOS, Android, Web
2016	A Midsummer Night’s Choice	Kreg Segall	Oornery and Rebecca Slitt	190,000	PC, Mac OS X, Linux, iOS, Android, Web
2016	Sorcery Is for Saps	Hilari Bell and Anna-Maria Crum	Oornery and Adam Strong-Morse	200,000	PC, Mac OS X, Linux, iOS, Android, Web
2016	Congresswolf	Ellen Cooper	Oornery and Rebecca Slitt	140,000	PC, Mac OS X, Linux, iOS, Android, Web
2016	Saga of the North Wind	Tom Knights	Oornery and Jason Stevan Hill	300,000	PC, Mac OS X, Linux, iOS, Android, Web
2016	Empyrean	Oornery and Kyle Marquis	Jason Stevan Hill	325,000	PC, Mac OS X, Linux, iOS, Android, Web
2016	Cannonfire Concerto	Caleb Wilson	Oornery and Rebecca Slitt	190,000	PC, Mac OS X, Linux, iOS, Android, Web
2016	VERSUS: The Elite Trials	Zachary Sergi	Oornery and Jason Stevan Hill	140,000	PC, Mac OS X, Linux, iOS, Android, Web
2017	Runt of the Litter	Kelly Sandoval	Oornery and Rebecca Slitt	150,000	PC, Mac OS X, Linux, iOS, Android, Web
2017	The Eagle’s Heir	Jo Graham and Amy Griswold	Oornery and Jason Stevan Hill	200,000	PC, Mac OS X, Linux, iOS, Android, Web
2017	Welcome to Moreytown	S. Andrew Swann	Oornery and Rebecca Slitt	150,000	PC, Mac OS X, Linux, iOS, Android, Web
2017	Demon Mark: A Russian Saga	Lorraine Fryer and Vladimir Barash	Oornery and Adam Strong-Morse	200,000	PC, Mac OS X, Linux, iOS, Android, Web
2017	Avatar of the Wolf	Bendi Barrett	Oornery and Jason Stevan Hill	135,000	PC, Mac OS X, Linux, iOS, Android, Web
2017	The Hero Unmasked!	Christopher Huang	Oornery and Rebecca Slitt	300,000	PC, Mac OS X, Linux, iOS, Android, Web
2017	Trials of the Thief-Taker	Joey Donald Jones	Oornery and Jason Stevan Hill	140,000	PC, Mac OS X, Linux, iOS, Android, Web
2017	Grand Academy for Future Villains	Katherine Nehring	Oornery and Mary Duffy	200,000	PC, Mac OS X, Linux, iOS, Android, Web
2017	Choice of the Cat	Jordan Reyne	Oornery and Mary Duffy	600,000	PC, Mac OS X, Linux, iOS, Android, Web
2017	The Superlatives: Aetherfall	Alice Ripley	Oornery and Mary Duffy	260,000	PC, Mac OS X, Linux, iOS, Android, Web
2017	Heart of the House	Nissa Campbell	Oornery and Jason Stevan Hill	360,000	PC, Mac OS X, Linux, iOS, Android, Web
2017	Choice of Rebels: Uprising	Joel Havenstone	HKO2006 and Adam Strong-Morse	637,000	PC, Mac OS X, Linux, iOS, Android, Web
2017	Broadway: 1849	Robert Davis	Mary Duffy	150,000	PC, Mac OS X, Linux, iOS, Android, Web
2017	T-Rex Time Machine	Rosemary Claire Smith	Rebecca Slitt	170,000	PC, Mac OS X, Linux, iOS, Android, Web
2017	Tally Ho	Kreg Segall	Rebecca Slitt	638,000	PC, Mac OS X, Linux, iOS, Android, Web
2017	The Cryptkeepers of Hallowford	Paul Wang	Jason Stevan Hill	360,000	PC, Mac OS X, Linux, iOS, Android, Web
2018	Undercover Agent	Naomi Laeuchli	Rebecca Slitt	135,000	PC, Mac OS X, Linux, iOS, Android, Web
2018	The Fielder's Choice	Nathaniel Edwards	Mary Duffy	115,000	PC, Mac OS X, Linux, iOS, Android, Web
2018	The Hero Project: Open Season	Zachary Sergi	Jason Stevan Hill	170,000	PC, Mac OS X, Linux, iOS, Android, Web
2018	Silverworld	Kyle Marquis	Jason Stevan Hill	560,000	PC, Mac OS X, Linux, iOS, Android, Web
2018	The Road to Canterbury	Kate Heartfield	Rebecca Slitt	175,000	PC, Mac OS X, Linux, iOS, Android, Web
2018	Rent-a-Vice	Natalia Theodoridou	Jason Stevan Hill	150,000	PC, Mac OS X, Linux, iOS, Android, Web
2018	I, Cyborg	Tracy Canfield	Rebecca Slitt	300,000	PC, Mac OS X, Linux, iOS, Android, Web
2018	Blood Money	Hannah Powell-Smith	Mary Duffy	290,000	PC, Mac OS X, Linux, iOS, Android, Web
2018	Werewolves: Haven Rising	Jeffrey Dean	Jason Stevan Hill	280,000	PC, Mac OS X, Linux, iOS, Android, Web
2018	Choice of Magics	Kevin Gold	Jason Stevan Hill	550,000	PC, Mac OS X, Linux, iOS, Android, Web
2018	DinoKnights	K.T. Bryski	Mary Duffy	177,000	PC, Mac OS X, Linux, iOS, Android, Web
2018	Choice of Broadsides: HMS Foraker	Paul Wang	Abby Trevor	85,000	PC, Mac OS X, Linux, iOS, Android, Web
2018	The Mysteries of Baroque	William Brown	Mary Duffy	200,000	PC, Mac OS X, Linux, iOS, Android, Web
2018	The Martian Job	M. Darusha Wehm	Rebecca Slitt	155,000	PC, Mac OS X, Linux, iOS, Android, Web
2018	Gilded Rails	Anaea Lay	Jason Stevan Hill	340,000	PC, Mac OS X, Linux, iOS, Android, Web
2018	Stronghold: A Hero's Fate	Jo Graham and Amy Griswold	Mary Duffy	250,000	PC, Mac OS X, Linux, iOS, Android, Web
2018	Weyrwood	Isabella Shaw	Rebecca Slitt	174,000	PC, Mac OS X, Linux, iOS, Android, Web
2018	Death Collector	Jordan Reyne	Mary Duffy	300,000	PC, Mac OS X, Linux, iOS, Android, Web
2018	7th Sea: A Pirate's Pact	Danielle Lauzon	Rebecca Slitt	200,000	PC, Mac OS X, Linux, iOS, Android, Web
2018	Tower Behind the Moon	Kyle Marquis	Mary Duffy	400,000	PC, Mac OS X, Linux, iOS, Android, Web
2019	Chronicon Apocalyptica	Robert Davis	Mary Duffy	250,000	PC, Mac OS X, Linux, iOS, Android, Web
2019	Drag Star!	Evan J. Peterson	Mary Duffy	150,000	PC, Mac OS X, Linux, iOS, Android, Web
2019	The Superlatives: Shattered Worlds	Alice Ripley	Mary Duffy	218,000	PC, Mac OS X, Linux, iOS, Android, Web
2019	Fog of War: The Battle for Cerberus	Bennett R. Coles	Jason Stevan Hill	170,000	PC, Mac OS X, Linux, iOS, Android, Web
2019	Pon Para and the Great Southern Labyrinth	Kyle Marquis	Jason Stevan Hill	430,000	PC, Mac OS X, Linux, iOS, Android, Web
2019	Fool!	Ben Rovik	Mary Duffy	420,000	PC, Mac OS X, Linux, iOS, Android, Web
2019	Asteroid Run: No Questions Asked	Fay Ikin	Rebecca Slitt	325,000	PC, Mac OS X, Linux, iOS, Android, Web
2019	Exile of the Gods	Jonathan Valuckas	Jason Stevan Hill	460,000	PC, Mac OS X, Linux, iOS, Android, Web
2019	Heroes of Myth	Abigail C. Trevor	Rebecca Slitt	560,000	PC, Mac OS X, Linux, iOS, Android, Web
2019	Psy High 2: High Summer	Rebecca Slitt	Jason Stevan Hill	270,000	PC, Mac OS X, Linux, iOS, Android, Web
2019	Sword of the Slayer	S. Andrew Swann	Mary Duffy	185,000	PC, Mac OS X, Linux, iOS, Android, Web

== Hosted titles ==
Year	Title	Author(s)	Editor	Word Count
2010	Popcorn, Soda... Murder?	Pauzle		
2010	The Nightmare Maze	Alex Livingston		
2010	What Happened Last Night?	Kie Brooks		
2010	Paranoia	Kie Brooks		
2010	Imprisoned	Myth Thrazz		
2010	The Sons of the Cherry	Alex Livingston		
2011	Land of Three Classes	Christopher Saloman		
2011	Marine Raider	Allen Gies		
2011	Dilemma	Mikhail Koroviev		
2011	Zombie Exodus	Jim Dattilo		750,000
2011	Zebulon	Matt Slaybaugh		
2011	Mobile Armored Marine	Steve Cave		
2011	Dead Already?	Kie Brooks		
2011	The Race	Andy Why		
2012	Apex Patrol	Allen Gies		
2012	Way Walkers: University	J. Leigh		
2012	Life of a Wizard	Mike Walter		130,000
2013	Sabres of Infinity	Paul Wang		200,000
2013	Paradox Factor	Mike Walter		
2013	Way Walkers: University 2	J. Leigh		
2013	Burn(t)	Vivi Tran		
2013	UnNatural	Sam Kabell		285,000
2013	Tin Star	Allen Gies		1,376,197
2014	Trial of the Demon Hunter	Samuel Young		85,000
2014	Planetary Quarantine	Andrew J. Schaefer		
2014	Life of a Mobster	Mike Walter		
2014	Fatehaven	Devon Connell		
2014	Path of Light	Ivailo Daskvalo		
2014	Sword of the Elements	Dmitry Drugov		200,000
2014	Gangs of Old Camp	Amith Shaju		
2014	Divided We Fall	Alex Clifford		130,000
2014	The Ascot	Duncan Bowsman		
2014	Silent Gear	Lee Yuan		
2014	Somme Trench	Andrew J. Schaefer		
2015	Lords of Aswick	Teo Kuusela		
2015	Seven Bullets	Cloud Buchholz		280,000
2015	The Lost Heir: The Fall of Daria	Mike Walter		145,000
2015	Zombien	Leon Naylor		
2015	The Volunteer Firefighter	Stefanie Handshaw		130,000
2014	Shadow Horror	Allen Gies		533,000
2015	No Proper Thief	Russell J. Dorn		
2015	Double/Cross	Toni Owen-Blue		85,000
2015	Samurai of Hyuga	Devon Connell		
2015	Dancing with Demons	Ivailo Daskalov		
2015	So, You're Possessed!	Tony R. Smith and Beth Townsend		50,000
2015	Founders Saga	Steve Spalding		
2015	Attack of the Clockwork Army	Felicity Banks		
2015	A Study in Steampunk	Heather Albano	Rebecca Slitt	277,000
2015	Factions: Raids of the Divided	Waseeq Mohammad	Sameer Abdali	
2016	Swamp Castle	Philip Kempton	Jerieth	102,000
2016	Guns of Infinity	Paul Wang	Brad Warner	440,000
2016	Zombie Exodus: Safe Haven	Jim Dattilo	Brad Warner	900,000
2016	Samurai of Hyuga Book 2	Devon Connell	Melissa Beattie	215,000
2016	The Lost Heir 2: Forging a Kingdom	Mike Walter	Paul Franzen	250,000
2016	Evertree Inn	Thom Baylay	Emma Joyce	265,000
2017	The Great Tournament	Philip Kempton	Jerieth	180,000
2017	Samurai of Hyuga Book 3	Devon Connell	Derek Connell	225,000
2017	The Lost Heir 3: Demon War	Mike Walter	Brad Walter	250,000
2018	The Great Tournament 2	Philip Kempton	Jerieth	300,000
2018	Fallen Hero: Rebirth	Malin Rydén	Mouse Bowden	380,000
2018	The Wayhaven Chronicles: Book One	Mishka Jenkins	William Artéan	440,000
2018	Life of a Mercenary	Philip Kempton	Jerieth	338,000
2019	The Saga of Oedipus Rex	J Colvin		100,000
2019	Samurai of Hyuga Book 4	Devon Connell	Mouse Elisedd	375,000
2019	War for the West	Lucas Zaper	Mouse Elisedd	485,000
2019	Keeper of the Sun and Moon	Brynn Chernosky	Dan Fabulich	310,000
2019	Sordwin: The Evertree Saga	Thom Baylay	Mouse Elisedd	440,000
2019	Breach: The Archangel Job	Michael Maxwell and S. Ben Luigi	Elizabeth Diana Hooper	
2020	The Wayhaven Chronicles: Book Two	Mishka Jenkins		750,000
2020	AI — Aftermath	Ivailo Daskalov		36,000
2020	Journey Into Darkness	Jonathan Clark		50,000
2020	War for Magincia	Philip Kempton	Jerieth	200,000
2020	Trees Don't Tell	Taylor Zane		
2020	President Disaster	Marc Faletti and Maeve Adams		35,000
2020	Macabre Mansion	Billy Towers		43,000
2020	The Floating City	Felicity Banks		130,000
2021	A Kiss from Death	William Loman	Mouse Elisedd	320,000
2021	Keeper of the Day and Night	Brynn Chernosky	Mouse Elisedd	390,000
2021	Lux, City of Secrets	Thom Baylay	J. Warner	438,000
2021	The Vampire Regent	Lucas Zaper and Morton Newberry	J. Warner	460,000
2022	The nascent Necromancer	Samuel Young	Jerieth	238,000
2022	Samurai of Hyuga Book 5	Devon Connell	Sarah Longfellow	430,000
2022	A Mage Reborn: Book One	Adam Alamsyah	Dan Fabulich	160,000
2022	The Golden Rose: Book One	Ana Ventura	Kara Aisenbrey	1,200,000
2023	Fallen Hero: Retribution	Malin Rydén	Mouse Elisedd	1,400,000
2023	Lords of Infinity	Paul Wang	Brad Warner	1,600,000
2023	The Wayhaven Chronicles: Book Three	Mishka Jenkins	Mouse Elisedd	1,200,000
2023	I, the Forgotten One	John Louis	Brad Warner	450,000
2024	Daria: A Kingdom Simulator	Mike Walter	J. Warner	125,000

== See also ==
- Vampire: The Masquerade (Choice of Games)
