= Kurt R. A. Giambastiani =

American novelist

Kurt R.A. Giambastiani
- Born: Kurt Robert Achilles Giambastiani; December 4, 1958 (age 67); San Rafael, California, U.S.
- Occupations: Novelist; Software developer
- Writing career
- Period: Early 21st century
- Genres: Science fiction, fantasy, adventure, romance, alternate history, historical fantasy, historical fiction
- Website: kurtgiambastiani.com

Kurt Robert Achilles Giambastiani (born December 4, 1958) is an American novelist whose works blend elements of science fiction, fantasy, adventure, and romance. Giambastiani's work is also usually imbued with a strong historical context, resulting in many of his novels being classified as alternate history, historical fantasy, or historical fiction.

== Biography ==
Born in San Rafael, California, Giambastiani first embarked on a career in music. He studied classical music at San Francisco State University before transferring to the Jerusalem Academy of Music and Dance in Jerusalem, Israel. He moved to Seattle, Washington in 1984.

Upon returning to the United States from Israel, he spent several years as a violist with regional orchestras, including five years as principal violist with the Bellevue Philharmonic in Washington State. At the same time, Giambastiani built a second career as a software developer.

Giambastiani switched from music to writing in the early 1990s, concentrating on short stories in science fiction and fantasy. After several publications of his short fiction, he turned to novels and, in 2001, debuted with The Year the Cloud Fell, the first volume in his Fallen Cloud Saga, which was a finalist for the Endeavour Award.

== Bibliography ==
=== Novels ===
==== Series novels ====
- The Fallen Cloud Saga
  - The Year the Cloud Fell (2001) Roc Books (ISBN 9780451458216) - 2nd edition (2012) Mouse Road Press
  - The Spirit of Thunder (2002) Roc Books (ISBN 9780451458704) - 2nd edition (2012) Mouse Road Press
  - Shadow of the Storm (2003) Roc Books (ISBN 9780451459169) - 2nd edition (2012) Mouse Road Press
  - From the Heart of the Storm (2004) Roc Books (ISBN 9780451459558) - Reissued as The Cry of the Wind (2012) Mouse Road Press (ISBN 1480165190)
  - Beneath a Wounded Sky (2012) Mouse Road Press (ISBN 1480165867)
- The Ploughman Chronicles
  - Ploughman's Son (2005) Mouse Road Press (ISBN 9781411637795)
  - Ploughman King (2006) Mouse Road Press (ISBN 9781411642546)

==== Standalone novels ====
- Dreams of the Desert Wind (2004) Fairwood Press (ISBN 9780974657332)
- Unraveling Time (2006) Mouse Road Press (ISBN 9781847289476)

=== Short works ===
- "Sum of the Angles" (Vision, 1991)
- "Supplanter" (Science Fiction Review, Winter 1991)
- "Veiled Glimpses" (Midnight Zoo, 1992)
- "Still Falling" (Air Fish, Catseye Books, 1993)
- "Spencer's Peace" (Dragon, March 1994)
- "Bio-Dome" (Year 2000 1995)
- "Intaglio" (Tomorrow, Oct 1995)
- "Of Light and Color" (Talebones, Fall 1997)
- "Long Distance" (Talebones, Fall 1998)
- "Ploughman's Son" (MZB's Fantasy Magazine 1999)
- "The Duenna" (Bygone Days, 2002)
- "The Revitalization of Emily" (Oceans of the Mind 2002) and (Mouse Road Press 2013)
- "Destrier's Will" (Bygone Days, 2004)
- "The Text" (Oceans of the Mind, 2004)
- "The Book of Solomon" (The Timberline Review, Autumn 2018)

=== Poetry ===
- From the Edge: Poems & Vignettes (2012) Mouse Road Press (ISBN 979-8465728607)

=== Non-Fiction ===
- Cryptogenesis: A Month-Long Journey from Health to Stroke Victim and Back (Mouse Road Press 2012)
