= Louise Marley =

American novelist

Marley at World Fantasy Convention 2026

Louise Marley (born August 15, 1952) is the pen name of Louisa Morgan, an American author of science fiction and fantasy. Her fiction often features strong female characters, and explores themes of hope, humanity, and faith in the distant future. Prior to her career as a writer, Marley was an opera singer with the Seattle Opera, and several of her books feature musical themes.

Marley also writes under the pseudonyms Cate Campbell and Toby Bishop.

== Bibliography ==
=== The Singers of Nevya series ===
- Sing the Light (1995)
- Sing the Warmth (1996)
- Receive the Gift (1997)
- Singer in the Snow (2005)

=== Other novels ===
- The Terrorists of Irustan (1999)
- The Glass Harmonica (2000 (winner 2001 Endeavour Award)
- The Maquisarde (2002)
- The Child Goddess (2004 (winner 2005 Endeavour Award)
- Mozart's Blood (2010)
- The Brahms Deception (2010)
- The Glass Butterfly (2010)
- Benedict Hall (2013)
- Hall of Secrets (2014)
- A Secret History of Witches (2017)
- The Witch's Kind (2019)
- The Age of Witches (2020)

=== Short story collections ===
- Absalom’s Mother & Other Stories
