= The Psalms of Isaak =

The Psalms of Isaak is a five-novel epic techno magic fantasy series by American author Ken Scholes. The first volume, Lamentation, was published in 2009. The series concludes with the publication of Hymn in 2017.

== Plot synopsis ==
=== Setting ===
The series is set in a far future, long after multiple apocalypses have shaped and reshaped the world. It opens with the explosive destruction of Windwir, The Named Lands' greatest city, by the most feared magic spell known in history, The Seven Cacophonic Deaths of Xhum Y'Zir. As the world goes through cataclysmic change with the genocide of the powerful Androfrancine Order and subsequent descent into war, the novel follows key players in the struggle to preserve the light of knowledge for present and future generations.

=== The Psalms of Isaak series ===
==== Lamentation ====
The world's most important city Windwir is destroyed by unknown forces using an ancient magic spell thought to have been lost. This decimates the Androfrancine Order, the bedrock of all society in the Named Lands, and brings about a war with shifting alliances.

==== Canticle ====
War in the Named Lands is over--or so everyone believes until a new antagonist attacks at a celebration.

==== Antiphon ====
The war with previously unknown forces continues as mechoservitors are driven to construct a mysterious "response."

==== Requiem ====
Conspiracies deepen and entangle as new players emerge and the world grows wider and wilder with every revelation.

==== Hymn ====
Revelations keep coming as the struggle to determine the world's fate comes to its final confrontations.

== Reception & Awards ==
The series was much-anticipated and well-received when it debuted in 2009. Orson Scott Card reviewed it for Audible.com, calling it “One of the finest works in [Fantasy] ever….”

Lamentation was on the American Library Association's Reading List 2010 as the year's best fantasy novel. Each subsequent volume received positive reviews. Publishers Weekly stated that the final volume "amply rewards fans of the series."

Awards include the 2011 Prix Imaginales for Lamentation, for best fantasy novel in translation into French. Canticle, the second volume, was a 2010 finalist for the Locus Award. The fourth book, Requiem, won the Endeavor Award in 2014.

== Publishing History ==
=== Overview ===
Each of the books in the series was initially published in hardcover. The first two audiobook editions were published by Macmillan, while the final three were produced on Audible.

Hardcover Release
#	Title	US Release
1	Lamentation	February 2009
2	Canticle	October 2009
3	Antiphon	September 2010
4	Requiem	June 2013
5	Hymn	December 2017

== More stories set in The Psalms of Isaak universe ==
- Of Metal Men and Scarlet Thread and Dancing with the Sunrise
- The Second Gift Given
- A Weeping Czar Behold the Falling Moon

== Inspiration and writing ==
The series grew out of a short story entitled Of Metal Men and Scarlet Thread and Dancing with the Sunrise originally printed in Realms of Fantasy August 2006. Author Ken Scholes has discussed the creation of the series in a number of interviews.
