= Vampires of El Norte =

2023 novel by Isabel Cañas

- Author: Isabel Cañas
- Language: English
- Publisher: Berkley Books
- Publication date: 15 Aug 2023
- Pages: 384 (hardcover)
- ISBN: 9780593436721

Vampires of El Norte is a 2023 novel by Isabel Cañas. The novel centers on the romance between Nena, daughter of a ranchero, and the vaquero Néstor. The novel takes place during the Mexican–American War, with the addition of vampires.

== Plot ==
Nena is the daughter of the ranchero of Los Ojuelos; Néstor is the son of a vaquero. Despite their different social classes, they are childhood friends. One night when they are thirteen, they search for buried treasure. They are attacked by a vampire, and Nena is bitten. Néstor brings an unconscious Nena back to the casa mayor. Believing that Nena has died and that he will be punished, Néstor flees.

Nine years later, in 1846, Néstor is working as a vaquero. He flits between romantic relationships but has never recovered from losing Nena. Meanwhile, Nena remains with her family at Los Ojuelos, training as a curandera. Several vaqueros have contracted a mysterious illness called susto. As the Mexican-American War begins, the United States claims the territory between the Rio Nueces and Rio Grande; this includes Los Ojuelos. Nena's father and some of his vaqueros join the Mexican auxiliary forces. Nena rides with them as their curandera. Néstor returns to Los Ojuelos, where he learns that Nena is alive. Néstor and Nena quarrel over the last nine years. Nena feels that Néstor abandoned her; Néstor feels that leaving was his only option.

The Mexican army is routed at the Battle of Palo Alto. Nena and Néstor escape together. As they flee the battlefield, they see vampires feeding on fallen soldiers and realize that the creatures are causing the susto. They journey back to Los Ojuelos. Along the way, they repair their relationship. They are attacked by a vampire. Nena beheads it. Later, they see a group of Rangers transporting vampires. She surmises that the Americans are using the captured vampires as weapons.

Néstor promises to marry Nena; they make love. They return to Los Ojuelos together. Nena's mother is furious that she has been traveling alone with an unmarried vaquero, fearing that Nena's reputation has been ruined. Nena's father banishes Néstor from Los Ojuelos. That night, the rancho is attacked by vampires and Americans. Because she was bitten as a child, Nena is able to communicate with the vampires. She frees the vampires who are being chained up by the Americans on the condition that they will leave the rancho and its inhabitants alone. The fighters of Los Ojuelos are then able to repel the Americans. Néstor returns to the rancho during the attack. Nena is injured; he carries her back to the casa mayor.

Nena and Néstor marry despite her parents’ disapproval. They purchase land and create a new rancho, Las Flores, for themselves.

== Reception ==
Writing for NPR, author Gabino Iglesias stated that Vampires of El Norte "elegantly navigates a multiplicity of genres to deliver an engaging story that cements Cañas as one of the best new voices bridging the gap between romance and speculative fiction". Iglesias praised the novel's use of Spanish as well as the comparison between the vampires and "invading Anglos". A review by John Mauro in Grimdark Magazine gave the novel 4 out of 5 stars. The review praised the folk horror elements of the novel's vampires, calling them "one of the most creative and compelling depictions of vampires that I have read in a long time."

Alex Brown of Locus wrote that "Vampires of El Norte is a thrilling end-of-summer ride", stating that the "heat between the two protagonists practically leaps off the page, and the descriptions are frighteningly vivid". Brown criticized the novel for its lack of Native American representation, writing that "I know these two characters wouldn’t think of colonialism in the same way we do ... but when your premise centers on the theft of land from families with generational ties by greedy, violent outsiders, it seems there should be at least some Native representation." A review in Lightspeed praised the alternating perspectives in the novel, stating that "Néstor’s chapters are drenched in Mexican western vibes. He occupies a rustic world where dust and the demons of the past intermingle. On the other hand, Nena’s chapters pulse with bridled desire and a longing for a life that isn’t chained to family obligations." The review concludes that some readers would be frustrated that the vampires don't take up more of the story, but that "die-hard fans of vampire fiction and dark romance will list Vampires of El Norte as a new favorite."

A review for Kirkus stated that "there are three different narratives here: a love story, a war story, and a horror story. Each is compelling in its own right. Unfortunately, the book’s weakness is that it can handle only two of them at a time." The review concludes that "while perhaps not greater than the sum of its parts, the parts themselves are quite good." Publishers Weekly wrote that the author "hits a bit of a sophomore slump". The review criticized the alternating points of view and the metaphor-heavy prose, concluding that the novel is a "clunky slog" and that "all but Cañas’s most devoted fans can skip this one."
