= Merc Fenn Wolfmoor =

American author of speculative fiction (born 1986)

- Born: June 14, 1986 (age 40); Ramsey County, Minnesota, USA
- Occupation: Author
- Writing career
- Genre: Speculative fiction
- Website: mercfennwolfmoor.com

Merc Fenn Wolfmoor (born June 14, 1986) is a prolific American author of speculative fiction short stories, active in the field since 2007. Their works have been published in a number of magazines and anthologies, including various collections of the year's best stories, and have been finalists for the Otherwise, Locus, and Nebula Awards along with winning the Nebula Award for Best Game Writing in 2025. Some of their early work was published as by Abby Rustad, Abby "Merc" Rustad, or Merc Rustad. They changed their name to Merc Fenn Wolfmoor in 2019.

== Biography ==
Wolfmoor was born in Minnesota, where they currently reside. They identify as queer, non-binary, aromantic, and asexual, are autistic, and have depression and anxiety; they also believe they have attention deficit hyperactivity disorder but were still seeking diagnosis as of 2021. They use they/them pronouns and prefer no honorific, but are okay with Mr. and Mx.

== Literary career ==
Wolfmoor's work has appeared in a large number of periodicals including Apex Magazine, Cicada, Fireside Fiction, Intergalactic Medicine Show, Lightspeed, Diabolical Plots, Escape Pod, Shimmer Magazine, Galaxy's Edge, and Uncanny Magazine, along with being reprinted in "year's best" anthologies such as the 2015, 2017, and 2018 editions of The Best American Science Fiction and Fantasy, The Year's Best Fantasy: Volume 1, Wilde Stories 2016: The Year’s Best Gay Speculative Fiction, Transcendent: The Best Transgender Fiction 2016, and Nebula Awards Showcase 2018.

Their work has also been featured in a number of original anthologies such as Love Hurts edited by Tricia Reeks and A People's Future of the United States: Speculative Fiction from 25 Extraordinary Writers edited by Victor LaValle and John Joseph Adams. Their story in that latter anthology, "Our Aim Is Not To Die", addresses the issue of ableism and features an autistic "non-binary human being who lives in a world where you're forced to choose a gender, or you are erased". Victor LaValle said the story "knocked me out of my chair".

== Critical reception ==
Publishers Weekly gave a starred review to Wolfmoor's short story collection So You Want to Be a Robot, calling their writing "creative, often whimsical, and deliciously inclusive" while Kirkus Reviews called the collection "a sparkling sequence of tales that bends and flips familiar ideas and fantastic visions".

Apex Magazine described Wolfmoor's fiction as "personal, raw, intimate, and powerful, featuring strong characters who are either on a journey to know exactly who they are, or have already reached that point and are waiting for others to catch up"."

== Awards ==
Wolfmoor has been a finalist for a number of awards. Their story "How to Become a Robot in 12 Easy Steps" was a finalist for the 2015 James Tiptree Jr. Award while "This Is Not a Wardrobe Door" was nominated for the 2017 Nebula Award for Best Short Story. So You Want to Be a Robot placed seventeenth in the 2018 Locus Poll Award for Best Collection. "I Sing Against the Silent Sun" was a preliminary nominee for the 2018 BSFA Award for Best Short Fiction. "The Sweetness of Honey and Rot" placed thirty-fourth in the 2019 Locus Poll Award for Best Novelette.

In 2025, Wolfmoor was part of the team that won the Nebula Award for Best Game Writing for A Death in Hyperspace.

== Bibliography ==
=== Collections ===
- So You Want to Be a Robot (2017)
- Friends for Robots (2021)
- The Lawless: A Triptych (2022)
- Good Monsters and Friends (2022)

=== Sun Lords of the Principality series ===
- "Tomorrow When We See the Sun" (2015)
- "Brightened Star, Ascending Dawn" (2017)
- "Longing for Stars Once Lost" (2017)
- "I Sing Against the Silent Sun" (2018) (with Ada Hoffmann)
- "With Teeth Unmake the Sun" (2019)

=== Short fiction ===
- "Hangman" (2007)
- "Unpermitted" (2009)
- "The Bastard Saga" (2009)
- "Queen for a Day" (2009)
- "Life, with Side Effects" (2009)
- "And the Teeth" (2010)
- "Sheila" (2010)
- "With the Sun and the Moon in His Eyes" (2012)
- "Thread" (2013)
- "Winter Bride" (2014)
- "How to Become a Robot in 12 Easy Steps" (2014)
- "Goodnight, Raptor" (2014)
- "Of Blessed Servitude" (2014)
- "To the Monsters, with Love" (2014)
- "Finding Home" (2015)
- "To the Knife-Cold Stars" (2015)
- "Where Monsters Dance" (2015)
- "The Sorcerer's Unattainable Gardens" (2015)
- "Under Wine-Bright Seas" (2015)
- "... Or Be Forever Fallen" (2016)
- "The Android's Prehistoric Menagerie" (2016)
- "This Is Not a Wardrobe Door" (2016)
- "Once I, Rose" (2016)
- "Iron Aria" (2016)
- "Lonely Robot on a Rocket Ship in Space" (2016)
- "The Gentleman of Chaos" (2016)
- "What Becomes of the Third-Hearted" (2016)
- "For Want of a Heart" (2016)
- "Monster Girls Don't Cry" (2017)
- "Later, Let's Tear Up the Inner Sanctum" (2017)
- "Painting Clouds" (2017)
- "A Survival Guide for When You're Trapped in a Black Hole" (2017)
- "Batteries for Your Doombot5000 Are Not Included" (2017)
- "Fathoms Deep and Fathoms Cold" (2017)
- "For Now, Sideways" (2017)
- "Thrice Remembered" (2017)
- "What the Fires Burn" (2017)
- "Two Reflections at Midnight" (2017)
- "The House at the End of the Lane Is Dreaming" (2017)
- "Mr. Try Again" (2018)
- "If We Die Unjustified" (2018)
- "Now Watch My Rising" (2018)
- "The Sweetness of Honey and Rot" (2018)
- "By Claw, by Hand, by Silent Speech" (2018) (with Elsa Sjunneson-Henry)
- "The Words of Our Enemies, the Words of Our Hearts" (2018)
- "The Frequency of Compassion" (2018)
- "Yet So Vain Is Man" (2018)
- "Our Aim Is Not to Die" (2019)
- "Through Dark and Clearest Glass" (2019)
- "The Judith Plague" (2019)
- "Sweet Dreams Are Made of You" (2019)
- "Flashlight Man" (2020)
- "This Cold Red Dust" (2020)
- "Bring the Bones That Sing" (2020)
- "Whether the Air, the Void, or the Earth" (2020)
- "Gray Skies, Red Wings, Blue Lips, Black Hearts" (2021)
- "The Machine is Experiencing Uncertainty" (2021)
- "Hexocolypse" (2021)
- "Housebot After the Uprising" (2021)
- "It Me, Ur Smol" (2021)
- "Steadyboi After the Apocalypse" (2021)
- "The Loincloth and the Broadsword" (2021)
- "The Heaven That They Never Knew" (2022)
- "So, You Married Your Arch Nemesis... Again" (2022)
- "The Girl with Thirteen Shadows" (2024)
