= Jay Lake =

American writer (1964-2014)

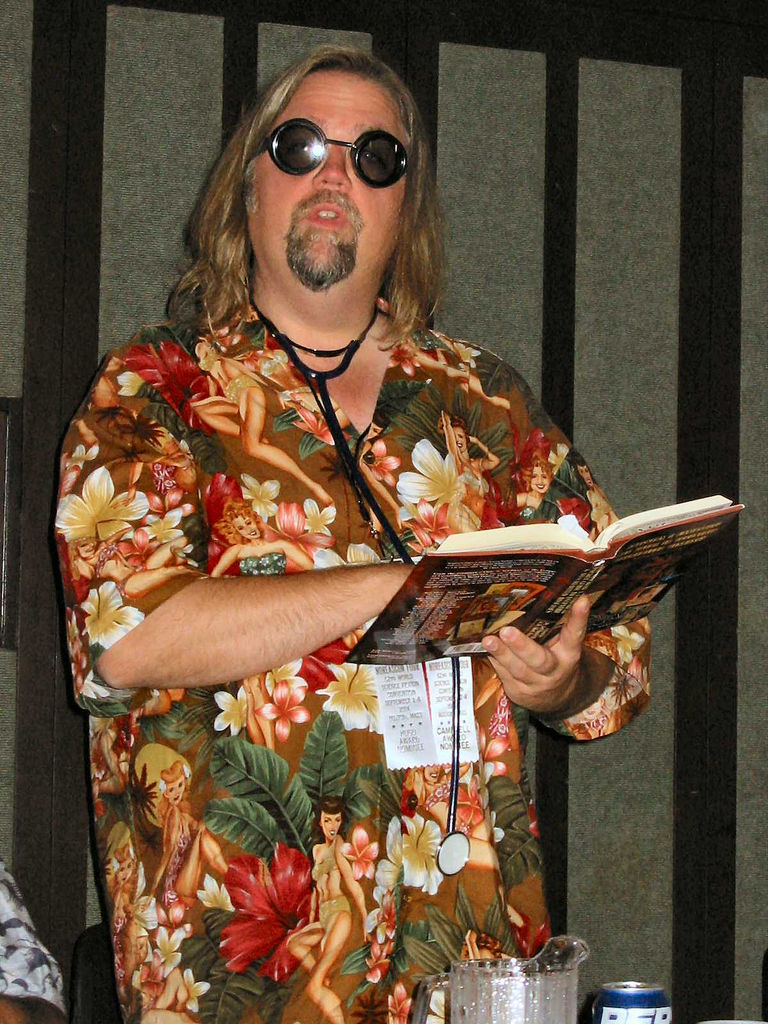
- Lake in 2004
- Born: Joseph Edward Lake, Jr. June 6, 1964; Taiwan
- Died: June 1, 2014 (aged 49); Portland, Oregon, U.S.
- Occupations: Writer, product manager
- Writing career
- Period: Early 21st century
- Genres: Science fiction, fantasy
- Notable awards: Campbell Award for Best New Writer (2004)
- Website: www.jlake.com

Joseph Edward "Jay" Lake Jr. (June 6, 1964 – June 1, 2014) was an American science fiction and fantasy writer. In 2003 he was a quarterly first-place winner in the Writers of the Future contest. In 2004 he won the John W. Campbell Award for Best New Writer in Science Fiction. He lived in Portland, Oregon, and worked as a product manager for a voice services company.

Lake's writings appeared in numerous publications, including Postscripts, Realms of Fantasy, Interzone, Strange Horizons, Asimov's Science Fiction, Nemonymous, and the Mammoth Book of Best New Horror. He was an editor for the "Polyphony" anthology series from Wheatland Press, and was also a contributor to The Internet Review of Science Fiction.

== Personal life ==
Lake was born in Taipei, Taiwan; he was the eldest of three children born to Joseph Edward Lake (a U.S. foreign service officer serving in Taiwan at the time). As a child he lived in Nigeria; Dahomey (now called Benin); Canada; Washington, D.C.; and returned to Taiwan for a number of years when his father was posted there a second time. He attended high school at Choate Rosemary Hall (in Connecticut) and later graduated from the University of Texas in 1986.

Lake publicly revealed his advanced case of colon cancer. He was diagnosed in April 2008, and it then "progressed from a single tumor to metastatic disease affecting the lung and liver, recurring after multiple surgeries and chemotherapy courses." He used crowd funding through YouCaring to pay for whole genome sequencing, towards the "small possibility that the results of such a test...may suggest a treatment path." Lake died of the illness on June 1, 2014, just five days before his 50th birthday.

Lake is the subject of a documentary called Lakeside – A Year With Jay Lake by Waterloo Productions. The film, which follows Lake's fight against cancer, had a special work-in-progress screening August 30, 2013, at the World Science Fiction Convention in San Antonio. As of May 2014, it is in post-production and is scheduled to premier at Sasquan in Spokane Washington during the 73rd World Science Fiction Convention on 21, 2015.

His posthumously published collection Last Plane to Heaven was honored with the 2015 Endeavour Award.

== Bibliography ==
=== The City Imperishable ===
- Trial of Flowers (2006) Night Shade Books (ISBN 1-59780-056-2)
- Madness of Flowers (2009) Night Shade Books (ISBN 1-59780-098-8)
- Reign of Flowers (unpublished)

In addition to these three novels there are at least two more stories set in the City Imperishable:

- "The Soul Bottles" from the anthology Leviathan 4: Cities (ed. by Forrest Aguirre, Night Shade Books, Nov. 2004) is the first published story of The City Imperishable.
- "Promises: A Tale of the City Imperishable" (2008) in Paper Cities: An Anthology of Urban Fantasy (ed. Ekaterina Sedia)

=== Mainspring universe ===
- Mainspring (June 2007) Tor Books (ISBN 0-7653-1708-7)
- Escapement (June 2008) Tor Books (ISBN 0-7653-1709-5)
- Pinion (March 2010) Tor Books

In addition to these three novels there are at least two more novellas set in the Mainspring Universe:

- "Chain of Fools" (Subterranean, Oct 2008) and
- "Chain of Stars" (Subterranean, Oct 2009), loose sequel to "Chain of Fools"

=== Green universe ===
- Green (June 2009) Tor Books
- Endurance (November 2011)
- Kalimpura (January 2013)

In addition to these three novels there are at least two more stories set in the world of Green:

- "A Water Matter" (Tor.com, 2008)
- "The Passion of Mother Vajpai" (with Shannon Page) in Subterranean: Tales of Dark Fantasy 2 (ed. by William Schafer, 2011)

=== Sunspin Universe ===
- Calamity of So Long a Life (unpublished)
- Their Currents Turn Awry (unpublished)
- The Whips and Scorns of Time (unpublished)
- All Our Sins Remembered (unpublished)
- "To Raise a Mutiny Betwixt Ourselves" (The New Space Opera 2, 2009, Harper Voyager)
- "Torquing Vacuum" (Clarkesworld Magazine, Feb 2010)
- "Permanent Fatal Errors" (Is Anybody Out There?, June 2010, DAW Books)
- "To This Their Late Escape" (The Sky That Wraps, 2010, Subterranean Press)
- "A Long Walk Home" (Subterranean Press, Winter 2011)
- "The Weight of History, the Lightness of the Future" (Spring 2012, Subterranean Press)

=== Other novels ===
- Rocket Science (2005) Fairwood Press (ISBN 0-9746573-6-0)
- Death of a Starship (2009) MonkeyBrain Books (Sunspin Universe)
- The Specific Gravity of Grief (novella) (2010) Fairwood Press
- The Baby Killers (novella) (2010) PS Publishing
- Original Destiny, Manifest Sin (forthcoming)

=== Collections ===
- Greetings From Lake Wu, Wheatland Press (2003) (ISBN 0-9720547-2-3)
  - Greetings from Lake Wu; Signed, numbered, luxury edition, Traife Buffet (2006) (ISBN 0-9787494-0-5)
- Green Grow the Rushes-Oh, Fairwood Press (2003) (ISBN 0-9746573-2-8)
- American Sorrows, Wheatland Press (2004) (ISBN 0-9755903-0-8)
- Dogs in the Moonlight, Prime Books (2004) (ISBN 1-930997-56-6)
- The River Knows Its Own, Wheatland Press (2007)
- The Sky That Wraps, Subterranean Press (2010) (ISBN 978-1-59606-266-5)
- Last Plane to Heaven: The Final Collection, Tor Books (2014) (ISBN 978-0-7653-7798-2)

=== Other works ===
METAtropolis: The Wings We Dare Aspire, with Ken Scholes, WordFire Press (May 2014) (978–1614751564)

=== Edited works ===
- Polyphony
  - Polyphony 1 (with Deborah Layne), Wheatland Press (July 2002) (ISBN 0-9720547-0-7)
  - Polyphony 2 (with Deborah Layne), Wheatland Press (April 2003) (ISBN 0-9720547-1-5)
  - Polyphony 3 (with Deborah Layne), Wheatland Press (2003) (ISBN 0-9720547-3-1)
  - Polyphony 4 (with Deborah Layne), Wheatland Press (2004) (ISBN 0-9720547-6-6)
  - Polyphony 5 (with Deborah Layne), Wheatland Press (2005) (ISBN 0-9755903-5-9)
  - Polyphony 6 (with Deborah Layne), Wheatland Press (December 2006)
- All-Star Zeppelin Adventure Stories (with David Moles), Wheatland Press/All-Star Stories (2004) (ISBN 0-9720547-7-4)
- TEL: Stories, Wheatland Press (2005) (ISBN 0-9755903-3-2)
- Spicy Slipstream Stories (with Nick Mamatas), Lethe Press (2008)
- The Exquisite Corpuscle (with Frank Wu), Fairwood Press (2008)
- Other Earths (with Nick Gevers), DAW Books (April 2009)
- Footprints (with Eric T. Reynolds), Hadley Rille Books (July 2009) (ISBN 0-9819243-9-5)
- Down In The Ship Mines (2012) in SQ Mag, Edition 4 (ed. Sophie Yorkston)

=== Short fiction ===
Title	Year	First published in	Reprinted in
The stars do not lie	2012	Asimov's Science Fiction 36/10&11 (Oct/Nov 2012)	
Rock of Ages	2013	METAropolis: Green Space (Audible)	The Year's Best Science Fiction, Thirty-First Annual Collection
Permanent Fatal Errors	2018	The Final Frontier (Collection, Neil Clarke, Ed.)	Also published as an audiobook (date unknown
