= Kate Heartfield =

Canadian author of speculative fiction

- Born: 1977 (age 48–49); Kitchener, Ontario, Canada
- Occupation: author
- Writing career
- Genres: Fantasy, science fiction, horror
- Kate Heartfield's voice recorded in August 2025
- Website: kateheartfield.com

Kate Heartfield is a Canadian author of fantasy, science fiction, horror, as well as a non-fiction writer and editor.

== Life ==
Heartfield was born in 1977 in Kitchener, Ontario, and grew up in Winnipeg. She received a degree in political science from the University of Ottawa and a master of journalism degree from Carleton University. She worked as an editorial board member and columnist for the Ottawa Citizen from 2004 to 2015, and was editorial pages editor for the paper from 2013 to 2015. She was nominated for Canada's Canada's National Newspaper Award in the category of Editorial Writing category in 2015. She now teaches journalism at Carleton University and creative writing online for The Loft Literary Center. She lives in rural Ottawa, Canada.

== Literary career ==
Heartfield's first published fiction appeared in the March 2013 issue of Black Treacle. She belongs to the Science Fiction and Fantasy Writers of America, the Historical Novel Society, the Writers' Union of Canada, Ottawa's East Block Irregulars, and the Codex writers' group. She was a member of the board of the Ottawa International Writers Festival from 2011 to 2014, a member of the science fiction jury for the Ottawa Book Award in 2017, and is currently (2020) on the novel jury for the Sunburst Award.

Heartfield's writing has appeared in various periodicals, anthologies and podcasts, including Alice Unbound: Beyond Wonderland, Black Treacle, Clockwork Canada, Curiosities, Daily Science Fiction, Escape Pod, 49th Parallels, GlitterShip, Kaleidotrope, Lackington's, Liminal Stories, Monstrous Little Voices: New Tales from Shakespeare's Fantasy World, Murder Mayhem Short Stories, On Spec, PodCastle, Postscripts to Darkness #4, Shades Within Us: Tales of Migrations and Fractured Borders, Spellbound, Strange Horizons, Tesseracts Twenty-One: Nevertheless, Tesseracts Twenty-Two: Alchemy and Artifacts, and Waylines.

Heartfield has also written for Choice of Games.

In June 2022, Heartfield was announced as the author of then-upcoming Assassin's Creed novel The Magus Conspiracy as part of the series' 15th anniversary celebration. In an interview with community developer Sebasteann Barradas, she reaveled that the novel was the first in a planned trilogy, titled The Engine of History. The novel was published by Aconyte Books on 2 August 2022 in the United States, and on 8 September in the United Kingdom. On 30 August, it was announced that the first sequel, The Resurrection Plot, had a planned release date of 2023; it was published on 4 July. In August 2024, Heartfield revealed on Twitter that, despite the initial announcement of The Engine of History as a trilogy, the publisher had no current plans for a third book in the series.

== Recognition ==
Heartfield's novel Armed in Her Fashion won the 2019 Aurora Award for Best Novel (English), was nominated for the 2019 Sunburst Award for Adult Fiction, and placed eighth in the 2019 Locus Award for Best First Novel. Her interactive medieval adventure novel The Road to Canterbury was nominated for the 2019 Nebula Award for Best Game Writing. Her novella Alice Payne Arrives was nominated for the 2019 Nebula Award for Best Novella and the 2019 Aurora Award for Best Short Fiction - English. Her stories "The Seven O'Clock Man", "Not Valid for Spain", and "A Threadbare Carpet" were preliminary nominees for the Sunburst Award.

== Bibliography ==
=== Novels ===
- Armed in Her Fashion (2018)
- The Embroidered Book (2022)
- The Valkyrie (2023)
- The Tapestry of Time (2024)
- Mercutio (2026)

==== Alice Payne series ====
- Alice Payne Arrives (2018)
- Alice Payne Rides (2019)

==== Assassin's Creed: The Engine of History series ====
- Assassin's Creed: The Engine of History – The Magus Conspiracy (2022)
- Assassin's Creed: The Engine of History – The Resurrection Plot (2023)

=== Interactive novels ===
- The Road to Canterbury (2018)
- The Magician's Workshop (2019)

=== Short stories ===
- "A Pair of Ragged Claws" (2013)
- "Word for Word" (2013)
- "For Sale by Owner" (2013)
- "Six Aspects of Cath Baduma" (2013)
- "The Dentist's Apprentice" (2013)
- "Traveller, Take Me" (2014)
- "Their Dead So Near" (2014)
- "Cattail Heart" (2014)
- "The Semaphore Society" (2014)
- "Bonsaiships of Venus" (2014)
- "Born on a Glumday" (2014)
- "'I'm Lonely: Immune to Apraxia, Toronto Doctor Refuses to Give Up on a Cure" (2015)
- "Limestone, Lye, and the Buzzing of Flies" (2015)
- "Isabelle the Stupendous" (2015)
- "This Is the Humming Hour" (2015)
- "The Course of True Love" (2016)
- "The Wedding of Snow, Earth, and Salt" (2016)
- "The Automatic Prime Ministers" (2016)
- "The Seven O'Clock Man" (2016)
- "I Know All of His Names" (2017)
- "Ad Infinitum" (2017)
- "Not Valid for Spain" (2017)
- "Something on Your Mind" (2017) (with Stewart C. Baker et al)
- "A Threadbare Carpet" (2018)
- "A Thousand Tongues of Silver" (2018)
- "Dressed in White Paper" (2018)
- "Gilbert Tong's Life List" (2018)
- "In Dragonfly Lake" (2018)
- "The Inland Beacon" (2019)
