= Yoon Ha Lee bibliography =

Bibliography of science fiction and fantasy author Yoon Ha Lee.

== Bibliography ==
=== Novels ===
==== Machineries of Empire trilogy ====
1. Ninefox Gambit. Solaris. 2016. ISBN 978-1781084496.
2. Raven Stratagem. Solaris. 2017. ISBN 978-1781085370.
3. Revenant Gun. Solaris. 2018. ISBN 978-1781086070.

==== Thousand Worlds series (middle grade) ====
1. Dragon Pearl. Rick Riordan Presents. 2019. ISBN 978-1368013352.
2. Tiger Honor. Rick Riordan Presents. 2022. ISBN 978-1368055543.
3. Fox Snare. Rick Riordan Presents. 2023. ISBN 978-1-368-08181-8.

==== Moonstorm series (young adult) ====
1. Moonstorm. Delacorte Press. 2024. ISBN 978-0-593-48833-1.
2. Starstrike. Delacorte Press. 2025. ISBN 978-0-593-48837-9.

==== Standalone novels ====
- Phoenix Extravagant. Solaris. 2020. ISBN 978-1781089194.
- Forthcoming: Code and Codex. Solaris. 27 Oct 2026. ISBN 978-1668059975.

=== Collections ===
- Conservation of Shadows (paperback ed.). Prime Books. 2013. ISBN 978-1607013877.
- The Candlevine Gardner and Other Stories. Self-published. 2015. A collection of 57 flash fiction stories.
- The Fox's Tower and Other Tales. Self-published, 2015; Andrews McMeel Publishing, 2021, ISBN 978-1524868130.
- Hexarchate Stories (paperback ed.). Solaris. 2019. ISBN 978-1781085646.

=== Short stories ===
==== Machineries of Empire stories ====
Title	Year	First published	Collected
Glass Cannon	2019	Hexarchate Stories	Hexarchate Stories
"Vacation"	August 25, 2017	self-published on Yoon Ha Lee's website as "Delicious Critters"	Hexarchate Stories
"Sword-Shopping"	August 21, 2017	self-published on Yoon Ha Lee's website	Hexarchate Stories
"Silence"	2019	Hexarchate Stories	Hexarchate Stories
"Seven View of the Liozh Entrance Exam"	September 7, 2017	self-published on Yoon Ha Lee's website	Hexarchate Stories
"Persimmon Quest"	September 5, 2017	self-published on Yoon Ha Lee's website	Hexarchate Stories
"Omens"	August 30, 2017	self-published on Yoon Ha Lee's website	Hexarchate Stories
"Irriz the Assassin Cat"	August 13, 2017	self-published on Yoon Ha Lee's website	Hexarchate Stories
"Hunting Trip"	June 26, 2017	self-published on Yoon Ha Lee's website	Hexarchate Stories
"How the Andan Court"	December 28, 2012	self-published on Yoon Ha Lee's website	The Fox's Tower and Other Tales, Hexarchate Stories
"Honesty"	January 8, 2015	self-published on Yoon Ha Lee's website	Hexarchate Stories
"Gloves"	2019	Hexarchate Stories	Hexarchate Stories
"Bunny"	June 17, 2017	self-published on Yoon Ha Lee's website	Hexarchate Stories
"Black Squirrels"	June 22, 2017	self-published on Yoon Ha Lee's website	Hexarchate Stories
"Birthdays"	June 19, 2017	self-published on Yoon Ha Lee's website	Hexarchate Stories
"The Chameleon's Gloves"	April 18, 2017	Cosmic Powers ed. John Joseph Adams, Saga Press	Hexarchate Stories
"Extracurricular Activities"	February 15, 2017	Tor.com	Hexarchate Stories
"Calendrical Rot"	2016	An Alphabet of Embers: An Anthology of Unclassifiables ed. R. B. Lemberg, Stone Bird Press	Hexarchate Stories
"Gamer's End"	August 18, 2015	Press Start to Play ed. John Joseph Adams and Daniel H. Wilson, Vintage Books	Hexarchate Stories
"The Battle of Candle Arc"	October 2012	Clarkesworld Magazine, issue #73	Hexarchate Stories
"The Robot's Math Lessons"	August 8, 2016	self-published on Yoon Ha Lee's website	Hexarchate Stories

==== Other short fiction ====
Title	Year	First published	Collected
"Bonsai Starships"	2022	Beneath Ceaseless Skies, issue #349	
"Lucky Day"	2020	Her Magical Pet: Benefit F/F Story Collection ed. Rachel Manija Brown, Laurie French, and Layla Lawlor	
"Beyond the Dragon's Gate"	2020	A Tor.com Original, ISBN 978-1250621603	
"The Mermaid Astronaut"	2020	Beneath Ceaseless Skies, issue #298	
"The Erasure Game"	2020	Take Us to a Better Place, Melcher Media	
"The Second-Last Client"	2019	Lightspeed Magazine, issue #114	
"The Empty Gun"	2019	Mission Critical ed. Jonathan Strahan, Solaris	
"Entropy War"	2018	2001: An Odyssey in Words ed. Tom Hunter and Ian Whates, NewCon Press	
"The Starship and the Temple Cat"	2018	Beneath Ceaseless Skies, issue #244	
"Obscura"	2018	Strange Horizons, 29 January 2018	
"Welcome to Triumph Band"	2017	Welcome to Dystopia ed. Gordon Van Gelder, OR Books	
"Shadow's Weave"	2016	Beneath Ceaseless Skies, issue #200	
"Falcon-and-Sparrows"	2016	The Mammoth Book of Cthulhu: New Lovecraftian Fiction ed. Paula Guran, Robinson	
"Foxfire, Foxfire"	2016	Beneath Ceaseless Skies, issue #194	
"The Cold Inequalities"	2015	Meeting Infinity ed. Jonathan Strahan, Solaris	
"Interlingua"	2015	Uncanny Magazine, issue #7	
"Variations on an Apple"	2015	"Tor.com	
"The Old Road"	2015	Not One of Us, issue #54	
"Snakes"	2015	Clarkesworld Magazine, issue #106	
"Apocalypse Foxes"	2015	Daily Science Fiction, June 2015	
"Two to Leave"	2015	Beneath Ceaseless Skies, issue #174	
"The Graphology of Hemorrhage"	2015	Operation Arcana ed. John Joseph Adams, Baen Books	
"The Queen's Aviary"	2015	Daily Science Fiction, January 2015	
"Always the Harvest"	2014	Upgraded ed. Neil Clarke, Wyrm Publishing	
"Distinguishing Characteristics"	2014	Dangerous Games ed. Jonathan Strahan, Solaris	
"Warhosts"	2014	War Stories ed. Jaym Gates and Andrew Liptak, Apex Publications	
"The Contemporary Foxwife"	2014	Clarkesworld Magazine, issue #94	
"Combustion Hour"	2014	Tor.com	
"The Bonedrake's Penance"	2014	Beneath Ceaseless Skies, issue #143	
"Wine"	2014	Clarkesworld Magazine, issue #88	
"The Coin of Heart's Desire"	2013	Once Upon a Time: New Fairy Tales ed. Paula Guran, Prime Books	
"The Knight of Chains, the Deuce of Stars"	2013	Lightspeed, issue #39	
"Iseul's Lexicon"	2013	Conservation of Shadows	Conservation of Shadows
"Effigy Nights"	2013	Clarkesworld Magazine, issue #76	Conservation of Shadows
"The Book of Locked Doors"	2012	Beneath Ceaseless Skies, issue #91	Conservation of Shadows
"A Vector Alphabet of Interstellar Travel"	2011	Tor.com	Conservation of Shadows
"Conservation of Shadows"	2011	Clarkesworld Magazine, issue #59	Conservation of Shadows
"Ghostweight"	2011	Clarkesworld Magazine, issue #52	Conservation of Shadows
"The Winged City"	2010	Giganotosaurus, issue #2	
"Flower, Mercy, Needle, Chain"	2010	Lightspeed, issue #4	Conservation of Shadows
"The Territorialist"	2010	Beneath Ceaseless Skies, issue #47	
"Between Two Dragons"	2010	Clarkesworld Magazine, issue #43	Conservation of Shadows
"The Pirate Captain's Daughter"	2009	Beneath Ceaseless Skies, issue #27	
"Dragon Logic"	2009	Japanese Dreams: Fantasies, Fictions & Fairytales ed. Sean Wallace, Lethe Press	
"The Bones of Giants"	2009	The Magazine of Fantasy & Science Fiction, vol 117, no 1&2	Conservation of Shadows
"Swanwatch"	2009	Federations ed. John Joseph Adams, Prime Books	Conservation of Shadows
"The Fourth Horseman"	2009	Electric Velocipede, issue #17/18	
"The Unstrung Zither"	2009	The Magazine of Fantasy & Science Fiction, vol 116, no 3	Conservation of Shadows
"Architectural Constants"	2008	Beneath Ceaseless Skies, issue #2	
"Blue Ink"	2008	Clarkesworld Magazine, issue #23	Conservation of Shadows
"Behind the Mirror"	2007	Coyote Wild, vol 1, no 1 (Winter 2007)	
"Notes on the Necromantic Symphony]"	2007	Farrago's Wainscot Part IV (October 2007)	
"The Inferno"	2007	Behind the Wainscot: The Five Senses	
"The Shadow Postulates"	2007	Helix SF issue #5	Conservation of Shadows
"Screamers"	2007	Ideomancer, vol 6, no 2	
"Hopscotch"	2006	Twenty Epics ed. Susan Marie Groppi and David Moles, All-Star Stories	
"Unstringing the Bow"	2006	Ideomancer, vol 5, no 2	
"So that Her High-Born Kinsmen Came"	2006	Sybil's Garage, issue #3	
"Nine Tails, Hundred Hearts"	2006	Fantasy Magazine, issue #2	
"The Sun's Kiss"	2005	Ideomancer, vol 4, no 3	
"Words Written in Fire"	2005	Shadows of Saturn issue #3	
"Moon, Paper, Scissors"	2005	Lady Churchill's Rosebud Wristlet issue #16	
"Eating Hearts"	2005	The Magazine of Fantasy & Science Fiction, vol 108, no 6	
"The Third Song"	2005	Lenox Avenue, issue #4	
"The Black Abacus"	2002	The Magazine of Fantasy & Science Fiction, vol 102, no 6	Conservation of Shadows
"Counting the Shapes"	2001	The Magazine of Fantasy & Science Fiction, vol 100, no 6	Conservation of Shadows
"Alas, Lirette"	2001	The Magazine of Fantasy & Science Fiction, vol 100, no 1	
"Echoes Down an Endless Hall"	2000	The Magazine of Fantasy & Science Fiction, vol 98, no 4	
"The Hundredth Question"	1999	The Magazine of Fantasy & Science Fiction, vol 96, no 2	
