= Marissa Lingen =

American science fiction writer (born 1978)

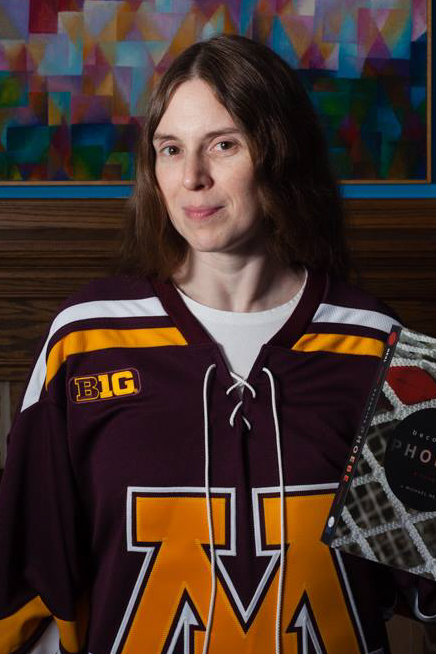
- Lingen in April 2016
- Born: July 26, 1978 (age 48); Libertyville, Illinois.
- Occupation: Author
- Years active: 2000–present
- Website: marissalingen.com

Marissa Kristine Lingen (born July 26, 1978) is an American science fiction and fantasy author who writes short stories.

== Life ==
Lingen was born in Libertyville, Illinois, to a family of Norwegian and Swedish descent. She studied physics and mathematics at Gustavus Adolphus College and worked at the Lawrence Livermore National Laboratory. She now lives in Minnesota.

Lingen has published more than 150 pieces of short fiction. In 1999, her story "In the Gardens and the Graves" won the Isaac Asimov Award, now known as the Dell Magazines Award, for short fiction. Her fiction has appeared in multiple anthologies, as well as in Nature, Tor, Ideomancer, Analog and Clarkesworld. Her story "The Ministry of Changes" has been translated into Italian and her stories have been reprinted in The Year's Best Science Fiction & Fantasy, 2013 Edition, Year's Best Young Adult Speculative Fiction 2015, Year's Best Young Adult Speculative Fiction 2014, The Year's Best Science Fiction: Twenty-Ninth Annual Collection, The Best of Beneath Ceaseless Skies Online Magazine, Year Two, Year's Best SF 15, and The Best of Jim Baen's Universe.

Lingen has a vestibular disorder that has influenced some of her stories, especially in understanding the impact of zero gravity and three-dimensional spaces.

== Bibliography ==
=== Short fiction ===
Collections

- Dragon Brother and other stories. Tired Tapir Press. 2014.

Stories

Title	Year	First published	Reprinted/collected	Notes
Potential side effects may include	2015	Lingen, Marissa & Alec Austin (July–August 2015). "Potential side effects may include". Analog Science Fiction and Fact. 135 (7&8): 76–81.		

- "In the Gardens and the Graves" – Asimov's Science Fiction (1999). Won the Isaac Asimov Award (now Dell Magazines Award).
- "Cornflake Girl" – Speculon (August 2000).
- "Butterhead" – Speculon (June 2001). Reprinted in Twin Cities Magazine of Science Fiction and Fantasy (September 2002).
- "The Handmade's Tale" – Future Orbits (December 2001). Received an Honorable Mention in The Year's Best Science Fiction: Nineteenth Annual Collection (ed. Gardner Dozois. St. Martin's Griffin, July 2002. ISBN 978-0-312-28879-2).
- "Irena's Roses" – Analog Science Fiction and Fact (June 2002).
- "Cassie's Deal" – Paradox12 (January 2002).
- "Grandma Disappears" – Spellbound (Spring 2002).
- "Instead of Glass Slippers" – Rogue Worlds (July 2002).
- "Bright Red -- Aim Here" – Short Stuff (August 2002).
- "Natural Limitations" – Ideomancer (April 2003).
- "Making It Home" – This Way Up (April 2003).
- "Goats' Gold" – Spellbound (Spring 2003).
- "Glass Wind" – Twin Cities Magazine of Science Fiction and Fantasy (January 2003).
- "Portrait of the Artist as a Young Boy (With Aliens)" – Would That It Were (January 2003). Co-written with Tim Cooper.
- "Prototype" – Far Sector SFFH (May 2003).
- "Drops of Yesterday" – SF-F.org (April 2003).
- "Wishing on Airplanes" – Oceans of the Mind (Summer 2003).
- "Dark Thread" – Challenging Destiny, Issue 17 (December 2003).
- "MacArthur Station" – Fortean Bureau (September 2003).
- "The Grumpiest Place on Earth" – Flash Me Magazine (July 2003).
- "Taste of Blood and Bubble-Gum" – Alien Skin (November 2003).
- "Rock, Paper, Scissors" – Zahir (February 2004).
- "Shylock's Pound" – Penumbric (October 2004).
- "Bestseller" – Continuum SF (December 2003).
- "Seven Minutes In Heaven" – Fortean Bureau (March 2004).
- "Fair Use" – Fables (Spring 2004).
- "Speed Dating" – EOTU E-Zine (February 2004).
- "Trail's End" – Alien Skin (March 2004).
- "Endgene" – Quantum Muse (March 2004).
- "Take Back the Night" – Kenoma (April 2004).
- "Under the Masks" – Monthly Short Stories (October 2004).
- "She Transcends" – Raven Electrick (November 2004).
- "From the Hip Flask" – SDO Fantasy (July 2004).
- "An Attack of Conscience" – Neo-opsis Science Fiction Magazine, Issue 3 (July 2004).
- "Big Sister" – Story Station (Summer 2004).
- "Anna's Implants" – Challenging Destiny, Issue 19 (November 2004).
- "Another Hollywood Miracle" – Fortean Bureau (November 2004).
- "Five Brothers Underground" – Kenoma (June 2005).
- "The Flask of Today" – Story Station (December 2005).
- "Even Without Deceit" – Fictitious Force, Issue 2 (May 2006).
- "The Beast's Apprentice" – Andromeda Spaceways Inflight Magazine, Issue 24 (July 2006).
- "Things We Sell to Tourists" – Aeon, Issue 6 (February 2006).
- "Heart-Shaped Hole" – Challenging Destiny, Issue 22 (May 2006).
- "The Opposite of Pomegranates" – Jim Baen's Universe, Issue 1 (June 2006). Reprinted in The Best of Jim Baen's Universe (ed. Eric Flint. Baen Books, July 2007. ISBN 978-1-4165-2136-5).
- "Silent Teraphim" – Aberrant Dreams, Issue 8 (Summer 2006).
- "Moth Kin" – Between Kisses Magazine (October 2006).
- "Michael Banks, Home from the War" – Aeon, Issue 9 (November 2006).
- "Singing Them Back" – Jim Baen's Universe, Issue 4 (December 2006).
- "A Six-Letter Word for Mom" – Fictitious Force, Issue 4 (2007).
- "Rest Stop" – Andromeda Spaceways Inflight Magazine, Issue 28 (2007).
- "Water, Flesh, and Stone" – Aberrant Dreams (January 2008).
- "Scribing a Line" – Fictitious Force, Issue 4 (2007).
- "Pirates by Adeline Thromb Age 8" – Shimmer Magazine, October 2007.
- "Alloy" – Nature Futures (September 2007). An audio version is available (Escape Pod, Issue 232, December 2009).
- "Väinämöinen and the Singing Fish" – Abyss & Apex Magazine Issue 27 (July 2008). An audio version is available (PodCastle, Issue 113, July 2010).
- "Making Alex Frey" – Jim Baen's Universe (June 2008).
- "Loki's Net" – Jim Baen's Universe (December 2008).
- "Search Strings" – Nature Physics Futures (February 2008).
- "Swimming Back from Hell by Moonlight" – Aeon, Issue 13 (February 2008).
- "In the Velvet Swamp" – Coyote Wild Magazine.
- "Gilding the Dandelion" – Aberrant Dreams Magazine (April 2009).
- "The Calculus Plague" – Analog Science Fiction and Fact (July 2009). Reprinted in Year's Best SF 15 (eds. David G. Hartwell, Kathryn Cramer. HarperCollins, May 2010. ISBN 978-0-06-172175-5) and Twenty-First Century Science Fiction: An Anthology (eds. David G. Hartwell, Patrick Nielsen Hayden. Tor Books, November 2013. ISBN 978-0-7653-2600-3).
- "Kay's Box" – Shimmer Magazine, Issue 11 (December 2009).
- "Erasing the Map" – Futurismic (February 2009).
- "Why I Live in the Silver Mine" – Jim Baen's Universe (August 2009).
- "Five Ways to Ruin a First Date" – Not One of Us (October 2009).
- "Quality Control" – Nature (October 2009).
- "The Grandmother-Granddaughter Conspiracy" – Clarkesworld Magazine (December 2009). Reprinted in Clarkesworld: Year Four (eds. Neil Clarke, Sean Wallace. Wyrm Publishing, June 2013. ISBN 978-1-890464-22-6).
- "The Six Skills of Madame Lumiere" – Beneath Ceaseless Skies, Issue 46 (July 2010). Reprinted in The Best of Beneath Ceaseless Skies Online Magazine, Year Two (ed. Scott H. Andrews. Firkin Press, July 2011. ASIN B005QBG96W).
- "The Witch's Second Daughter" – Andromeda Spaceways Inflight Magazine, Issue 49 (December 2010). An audio version is available (PodCastle Miniature 66, October 2011).
- "Some of Them Closer" – Analog Science Fiction and Fact (January 2011). Reprinted in The Year's Best Science Fiction: Twenty-Ninth Annual Collection (ed. Gardner Dozois. St. Martin's Griffin, July 2012. ISBN 978-1-250-00354-6). Reprinted in Forever Magazine, Issue 60 (January 2020). An audio version is available (Escape Pod, Issue 366, October 2012).
- "Entanglement" – Nature (March 2011).
- "Tusk and Skin" – Bewere the Night (ed. Ekaterina Sedia. Prime Books, April 2011. ISBN 978-1-60701-252-8)
- "Blood Man Calls the Whale" – Andromeda Spaceways Inflight Magazine, Issue 53, March 2012.
- "The Witch's Second" – Beneath Ceaseless Skies (August 2011).
- "Modification or Mutation: 8 Ways a Parent Can Be Sure" – Daily Science Fiction, September 7, 2011.
- "On the Acquisition of Phoenix Eggs (Variant)" – Lightspeed (January 2012). An audio version is available (PodCastle 245, February 2013).
- "Calibrated Allies" – Beneath Ceaseless Skies (January 2012). Reprinted in Ceaseless Steam: Steampunk Stories from Beneath Ceaseless Skies (ed. Scott H. Andrews. Firkin Press, July 2012. ASIN B002FZISIO).
- "Brief Interviews With Therianthropes" – Daily Science Fiction (June 2012). Co-written with Alec Austin.
- "Dinosaurs of the Southern Dust Bowl" – White Cat Magazine (Spring 2012).
- "Cursed Motives" – Beneath Ceaseless Skies (October 2012). An audio version is available.
- "The Radioactive Etiquette Book" – Analog Science Fiction and Fact (March 2013). An audio version is available (StarShipSofa 316, December 2013).
- "The Young Necromancer's Guide to Re-Capitation" – On Spec (Winter 2014). Co-written with Alec Austin.
- "The Un-Wisher" – Spellbound Magazine (Winter 2012).
- "Armistice Day" – Beneath Ceaseless Skies, Issue 117 (March 2013). An audio version is available.
- "Milk Run" – Analog Science Fiction and Fact July 2013. Co-written with Alec Austin.
- "The Troll (A Tale Told Collectively)" – Daily Science Fiction (May 2013).
- "On the Weaponization of Flora and Fauna" – Beneath Ceaseless Skies, Issue 129 (September 2013). Co-written with Alec Austin.
- "Ask Citizen Etiquette" – Asimov's Science Fiction (February 2014).
- "Things We Have in This House for No Reason" – Analog Science Fiction and Fact (October 2013).
- "Unsolved Logistical Problems in Time Travel (Spring Semester)" – Nature Futures (November 2013).
- "The Suitcase Aria" – Strange Horizons (February 2014). An audio version is available.
- "The Stuff We Don't Do" – Nature Physics Futures (April 2014). Reprinted in Nature Futures 2: Science Fiction from the Leading Science Journal (eds. Henry Gee, Colin Sullivan. Tor Books, September 2014. ISBN 978-1-4668-7998-0). Reprinted in Year's Best Young Adult Speculative Fiction 2014 (eds. Julia Rios, Alisa Krasnostein. Twelfth Planet Press, January 2016. ISBN 978-1-922101-35-8).
- "Calm" – Analog Science Fiction and Fact (September 2014). Co-written with Alec Austin.
- "Maxwell's Demon Went Down to Georgia" – Nature Futures (June 2014).
- "A House of Gold and Steel" – Beneath Ceaseless Skies (December 2014).
- "Emma Goldman: A Biography for Space Aliens" – Daily Science Fiction (October 2014).
- "Empty Monuments" – Insert Title Here (ed. Tehani Wessely. Fablecroft Publishing, April 2015. ISBN 978-0-9925534-1-8). Co-written with Alec Austin.
- "Boundary Waters" – Nature Futures (November 2014).
- "The Hanged Woman's Portion" – Not Our Kind (ed. Nayad Monroe. Alliteration Ink Publishing, October 2019. ISBN 978-1-939840-25-7).
- "Human Trials" – Abyss & Apex Magazine, Issue 56 (October 2015). Co-written with Alec Austin.
- "Out of the Rose Hills" – Beneath Ceaseless Skies, Issue 173 (May 2015).
- "It Brought Us All Together" – Strange Horizons (July 2015).
- "Ten Stamps Viewed Under Water" – The Magazine of Fantasy & Science Fiction (September 2015).
- "Draft Letter on Research Potential Suggested by Recent Findings in Gnome Genomics" – Evil Girlfriend Media (July 2015).
- "The Many Media Hypothesis" – Nature Futures (October 2015).
- "Upside the Head" – Science Fiction by Scientists: An Anthology of Short Stories (ed. Mike Brotherton. Springer Publishing, November 2016. ISBN 978-3-319-41101-9).
- "How to Wrap a Roc's Egg" – self-published online, marissalingen.com (December 2015).
- "The Most Important Thing" – Nature Futures (October 2016).
- "The Elf Who Thought He Was Teddy Roosevelt" – self-published online, marissalingen.com (December 2016).
- "In the Ancestor's New House" – Spirits Unwrapped (ed. Daniel Braum. Lethe Press, October 2019. ISBN 978-1-59021-695-8).
- "A Lab of One's Own" – On Spec, Issue #106, Volume 28, No 3 (Winter 2017). Co-written with Alec Austin.
- "Out of the Woods" – Beneath Ceaseless Skies (February 2017). An audio version is available.
- "The Psittaculturist's Lesson" – Daily Science Fiction (January 2017).
- "Running Safety Tips for Humans" – Nature (April 2017). Translated into Spanish: "Consejos de seguridad para corredores humanos" – Cuentos para Algernon, Especial ultracortos XVII (May 2019).
- "An Unearned Death" – The Magazine of Fantasy & Science Fiction (July/August 2017).
- "Across Pack Ice, a Fire" – Beneath Ceaseless Skies (August 2017).
- "Vervain, Grasshopper, Sun" – Daily Science Fiction (April 2017).
- "Two Point Three Children" – Analog Science Fiction and Fact (January 2018).
- "The Hand of Loki" – New Myths Magazine, Issue 38 (March 2017).
- "The Influence of the Iron Range" – Beneath Ceaseless Skies (October 2017).
- "Flow" – Fireside Magazine (March 2018).
- "I Won at NaSuHeMo!" – Daily Science Fiction (November 2017).
- "Planet of the Five Rings" – Nature Futures (September 2017).
- "Lines of Growth, Lines of Passage" – Uncanny Magazine, Issue 20 (January 2018). An audio version with interview is available (Uncanny Magazine Podcast 20B, February 2018).
- "The Shale Giants" – Reckoning (December 2017).
- "The Jagged Bones of Sea Saw Town" – Analog Science Fiction and Fact (November 2018).
- "Seven Point Two" – Nature (January 2018).
- "The Deepest Notes of the Harp and Drum" – Beneath Ceaseless Skies (January 2019).
- "My Favorite Sentience" – Nature Futures (April 2018).
- "This Will Not Happen to You" – Uncanny Magazine, Issue 24, Disabled People Destroy Science Fiction special issue (September 2018).
- "Painting the Massive Planet" – Analog Science Fiction and Fact (May 2019).
- "Say It With Mastodons" – Nature (November 2018).
- "Objects in the Nobel Museum, 2075" – Daily Science Fiction (December 2018).
- "The Thing, With Feathers" – Uncanny Magazine (January 2019).
- "Filaments of Hope" – Analog Science Fiction and Fact (November 2019).
- "How We Know They Have Faces" – Nature (July 2019).
- "Wrap Me In Oceans Wide" – Strange Horizons (July 2019).
- "Purposeful" – Daily Science Fiction (October 2019).
- "Family Album" – Nature (November 2019).

Carter Hall Stories

- "Carter Hall Recovers the Puck" – On Spec Issue 64, Vol 18, No 1 (Spring 2006).
- "Carter Hall Sweeps a Path" – On Spec Issue 72, Vol 20, No 1 (Spring 2008).
- "Carter Hall Judges the Lines" – On Spec Issue 79, Vol 21, No 4 (Winter 2009).
- "Carter Hall and the Motley Lions" – On Spec Issue 88, Vol 24, No 1 (Spring 2012).

Post-Nuclear Fantasies (Shared Universe)

- "Uncle Flower's Homecoming Waltz" – Tor.com (February 2012). Reprinted in The Year's Best Science Fiction & Fantasy, 2013 Edition (ed. Rich Horton. Prime Books, July 2013. ISBN 978-1-60701-392-1).
- "The Ministry of Changes" – Tor.com (July 2013). Translated into Italian: "Il Ministero del Cambiamento" – Vapori D'Arsenico Sabato 17 (August 2013).
- "The Salt Path" – Apex Magazine Issue 61 (June 2014).
- "The New Girl" – Apex Magazine Issue 66 (November 2014).
- "Surfacing" – Lightspeed (March 2015).
- "The Dust Gate" – The Sockdolager (Fall 2016).
- "Drifting Like Leaves, Falling Like Acorns" – Analog Science Fiction and Fact (January 2017).

Oort-Cloud Stories

- "Blue Ribbon" – Analog Science Fiction and Fact (March 2015). Reprinted in Year's Best Young Adult Speculative Fiction 2015 (eds. Julia Rios, Alisa Krasnostein. Kaleidoscope, August 2016. ISBN 978-1-922101-50-1). Reprinted in Lightspeed Issue 88 (September 2017).
- "Points of Origin" – Tor.com (November 2015). An audio version is available (Escape Pod 698, September 2019).
- "Vulture's Nest" – Analog Science Fiction and Fact (May 2017).
- "Finding Their Footing" – Analog Science Fiction and Fact (May 2018).
- "Left to Take the Lead" – Analog Science Fiction and Fact (July 2018). Reprinted in Clarkesworld Magazine (January 2019).

=== Non-fiction ===
- "What the Kelk is that Dwarf-Lover Doing?: Building a Better World Through Offensive Language" – Phantastes (Spring 2001)
- "The Suburbs of Amber" – Strange Horizons (May 2001)
- "Camp Sparta" – Skirt! (June 2001)
- "Diversity, Hold the Sugar" – Skirt! (November 2001)
- "Bose-Einstein Condensates" – Strange Horizons (December 2001)
- "Drawing the Line: What Makes YA Fiction?" – Speculon (February 2002)
- "A Perfect Fit" – Skirt! (July 2002)
- "Near Bliss" – Skirt! (June 2003)
- "Fresh-Baked Legacy" – Skirt! (November 2003)
- "The Apple and the Castle" – The Reader: War for the Oaks (Tired Tapir Press, 2014)
- "How Far Are We From Minneapolis?" – Reckoning Issue 1 (Winter 2016)
- "Hard Enough" – Uncanny Magazine Issue 21 (March 2018)
- "The Seduction of Numbers, the Measures of Progress" – Uncanny Magazine Issue 23 (July 2018)
- "Malfunctioning Space Stations – Uncanny Magazine Issue 24, Disabled People Destroy Science Fiction special issue (September 2018)
- "That Never Happened" – Uncanny Magazine Issue 27 (March 2019)
- "Beyond Cinderella: Exploring Agency Through Domestic Fantasy" – Tor.com (May 2019)
- "Beware the Lifeboat" – Uncanny Magazine Issue 29 (July 2019)
- "Save Me a Seat on the Couch: Spoiler Culture, Inclusion, and Disability" – Uncanny Magazine Issue 32 (January 2020)

=== Critical studies and reviews of Lingen's work ===
- Lovett, Richard A. (March 2015). "Marissa Lingen". Biolog. Analog Science Fiction and Fact. 135 (3): 61.
