= Richard A. Lovett =

American novelist

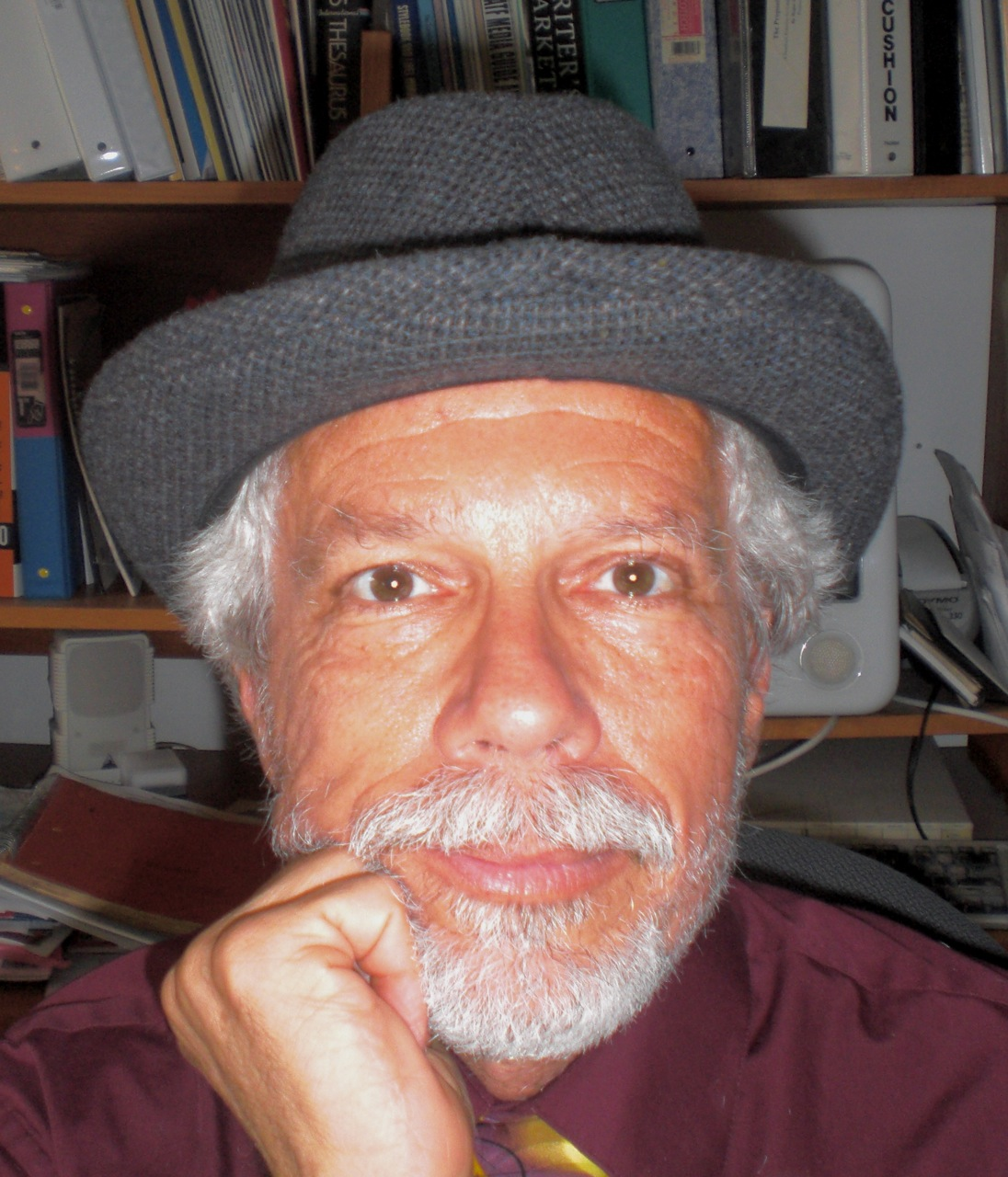
- Richard A. Lovett, 2009
- Born: October 28, 1953 (age 72); Dixon, Illinois, United States
- Education: Michigan State University B.A. (astrophysics) 1975; University of Michigan J.D. 1978, PhD (economics) 1981
- Occupation: Writer
- Writing career
- Genres: Science fiction, science, sports, profile, humor, journalism
- Notable awards: AnLab (thirteen times)
- Website: richardalovett.com

Richard A. Lovett (born October 28, 1953) is an American science fiction author and science writer from Portland, Oregon. He has written numerous short stories and factual articles that have appeared in multiple literary and scientific magazines and websites, including Analog Science Fiction and Fact, National Geographic News, Nature, New Scientist, Science, Scientific American, Cosmos, and Psychology Today.

Lovett is one of the most prolific and decorated writers in Analog's 80-plus-year history. His first formal appearance in the magazine other than a 1993 letter to the editor was "Tricorders, Yactograms and the Future of Analytical Chemistry: When 'Nano-' Isn't Small Enough" (April 1999), a science article. His first fiction appearance was the novelette "Equalization" (March 2003).

Lovett first won the magazine's reader's choice award, the Analytical Laboratory (AnLab), in 2002 for a 2001 fact article, "Up in Smoke: How Mt. St. Helens Blasted Conventional Scientific Wisdom" (April 2001). Since then he has won the award a record thirteen times, three times for novelettes, three times for novellas, and seven times for science articles. Including the 2015 awards, he has also placed in the top five 33 additional times, more than any other Analog contributor. As of the July/Aug 2015 issue, his work had appeared in the magazine 134 times, placing him second place on the magazine's all-time contributor list. In addition to writing fiction and science articles for the magazine, he has also written profiles (called Biologs) since 2006, and a series of how-to articles about writing short stories. These special features comprise about a quarter of his total contributions to the magazine.

His science fiction stories have also appeared in Nature, Cosmos, Abyss and Apex, Esli (Russian translation), Running Times, and Marathon & Beyond.

== Coaching and sports writing ==
In addition to writing science fiction, Lovett is coach of Team Red Lizard, a 240-member running club in Portland, Oregon, as well as of seven women who qualified to compete for the 2012, 2016, or 2020 U.S. Olympic Marathon Team, and one member of the U.S. Snow Shoe Racing Team. He writes frequent features about distance running for Running Times magazine and Marathon & Beyond, Podium Runner, Women's Running, and Peak Performance (UK), and has written Olympic-related news articles and features for National Geographic News, Cosmos, and the San Diego Union-Tribune newspaper. He has also co-authored two running books with marathon legend Alberto Salazar, plus two books on bicycle touring and one on cross-country skiing.

== Bibliography ==
=== Short fiction ===
Collections

- Lovett, Richard A. & Mark Niemann-Ross (2012). Phantom sense and other stories. Strange Wolf Press.
  - Contents: A deadly intent (2008); NetPuppets (2005); New wineskins (2008); Phantom science (2010); Phantom sense (2010)

=== Non fiction ===
- Lovett, Richard A. (April 1999). "Tricorders, yactograms and the future of analytical chemistry: When 'nano-' isn't small enough". Analog Science Fiction and Fact. 119 (4): 41–51.
- — (February 2001). "The view from space: Satellites predict a lot more than weather". Analog Science Fiction and Fact. 121 (2): 48–59.
- — (April 2001). "Up in Smoke: How Mt. St. Helens Blasted Conventional Scientific Wisdom". Analog Science Fiction and Fact. 121 (4).
- — (October 2001). "No Apparent Danger: The True Story of Volcanic Disaster at Galeras and Nevado del Ruiz, by Victoria Bruce (review)". Analog Science Fiction and Fact. 121 (10): 137.
- — (June 2002). "Subsisting on oxygen lite: Altitude research, Himalayan mountaineering, and their applications to alien worlds". Analog Science Fiction and Fact. 122 (6): 48–60.
- — (February 2002). "Living at Extremes: Antarctic Lakes Yield Lessons for Mars, Europa, and Beyond". Analog Science Fiction and Fact. 122 (2): 48–60.
- — (September 2002). "Sedimentology gone wild: The onion-layer theory of time travel". Analog Science Fiction and Fact. 122 (9): 52–63.
- — (September 2002). "Hubbert's Peak: The Impending World Oil Shortage" (Review)". Analog Science Fiction and Fact. 122 (9): 137.
- — (February 2003). "Paleolakes, Jøkulhlaups, and Mobergs: What Iceland Reveals about 'Wet Mars'". Analog Science Fiction and Fact. 123 (2): 52–63.
- — (May 2003). "The Search for Extraterrestrial Oceans". Analog Science Fiction and Fact. 123 (5): 36–45.
- — (July 2003). "From Salt Foam to Artificial Oysters: Innovative Solutions to Global Warming". Analog Science Fiction and Fact. 123 (7&8): 43–51.
- — (July 2003). "Volcanoes in Human History: The Far-Reaching Effects of Major Eruptions (book review)". Analog Science Fiction and Fact. 123 (7&8): 209.
- — (November 2003). "Moving Beyond 'Life as We Know It': Astrobiology Takes On 'Earthist-centricity". Analog Science Fiction and Fact. 123 (11): 30–41.
- — (April 2004). "Forensic Seismology: The Big Science of Minor Shakeups". Analog Science Fiction and Fact. 124 (4): 24–33. Polish Translationin Nowa Fantastyka, October 2004.
- — (June 2004). "The Transience of Memory: We Really Can Remember It for You Wholesale". Analog Science Fiction and Fact. 124 (6): 38–45.
- — (November 2004). "Fat Mice, Eating Machines, and Biochemical Treason: Will We Ever Create a Dial-a-Weight Pill?". Analog Science Fiction and Fact. 124 (11): 34–43.
- — (March 2005). "The Prehistory of Global Climate Change". Analog Science Fiction and Fact. 125 (3): 30–41.
- — (June 2005). "Gene Doping and Other Olympic Scandals of the (Not-So Distant) Future". Analog Science Fiction and Fact. 125 (6): 34–44.
- — (October 2005). "The Wired Ocean: Doing Oceanography Without Getting All Wet". Analog Science Fiction and Fact. 125 (10): 26–35.
- — (January 2006). "From Fimbulwinter to Dante's Hell: The Strange Saga of Snowball Earth". Analog Science Fiction and Fact. 126 (1&2): 86–965.
- — (April 2006). "Stephen Baxter". Biolog. Analog Science Fiction and Fact. 126 (4).
- — (May 2006). "Catherine Shaffer". Biolog. Analog Science Fiction and Fact. 126 (5).
- — (July 2006). "Messengers from the Earth's Core? The Great Plume Debate Heats Up". Analog Science Fiction and Fact. 126 (7&8): 36–44.
- — (October 2006). "The Great Sumatran Earthquakes of 2004-5". Analog Science Fiction and Fact. 126 (10): 46–55.
- — (October 2006). "Robert J. Howe". Biolog. Analog Science Fiction and Fact. 126 (10).
- — (January 2007). "After gas: are we ready for the end of oil?". Analog Science Fiction and Fact. 127 (1&2).
- — (April 2007). "The Ice Age that Wasn't: How our ancestors may have held the ice at bay". Analog Science Fiction and Fact. 127 (4): 44–51.
- — (June 2007). "Cryovolcanoes, Swiss Cheese, and the Walnut Moon". Analog Science Fiction and Fact. 127 (6): 40–52.
- — (July 2007). "Joe Schembrie". Biolog. Analog Science Fiction and Fact. 127 (7&8).
- — (September 2007). "E. Mark Mitchell". Biolog. Analog Science Fiction and Fact. 127 (9): 70.
- — (October 2007). "Ekaterina Sedia". Biolog. Analog Science Fiction and Fact. 127 (10).
- — (November 2007). "The Search for the World's First Equestrians". Analog Science Fiction and Fact. 127 (11): 48–54.
- — (January–February 2008). "Mia Molvray". Biolog. Analog Science Fiction and Fact. 128 (1&2).
- — (April 2008). "Nuclear autumn: the consequences of a 'small' nuclear war". Analog Science Fiction and Fact. 128 (4): 30–35.
- — (June 2008). "Peroxide snows, ejected moons, and deserts that create themselves". Analog Science Fiction and Fact. 128 (6): 38–45.
- — (October 2008). "Here be there dragons: the Ivory-Billed Woodpecker and other mysteries of an explored planet". Analog Science Fiction and Fact. 128 (10).
- — (October 2008). "Mark Niemann-Ross". Biolog. Analog Science Fiction and Fact. 128 (10).
- — (December 2008). "David Bartell". Biolog. Analog Science Fiction and Fact. 128 (12): 7.
- — (December 2008). "Green nanotechnology". Analog Science Fiction and Fact. 128 (12): 22–28.
- — (April 2009). "James Eric Stone". Biolog. Analog Science Fiction and Fact. 129 (4): 49.
- — (May 2009). "Geology, Geohistory, and "Psychohistory": The (Continuing) Debate Between Uniformitarians and Catastrophists". Analog Science Fiction and Fact. 129 (5): 23–29.
- — (June 2009). "Craig DeLancey". Biolog. Analog Science Fiction and Fact. 129 (6): 7.
- — (September 2009). "From Atlantis to canoe-eating trees: geomythology comes of age". Analog Science Fiction and Fact. 129 (9): 32–38.
- — (October 2009). "William Gleason". Biolog. Analog Science Fiction and Fact. 129 (10).
- — (December 2009). "Plate tectonics, Goldilocks, and the Late Heavy Bombardment : why Earth isn't Mars or Venus". Analog Science Fiction and Fact. 129 (12): 21–27.
- — (January 2010). "Kristine Kathryn Rusch". Biolog. Analog Science Fiction and Fact. 130 (1&2).
- — (March 2010). "Christopher L. Bennett". Biolog. Analog Science Fiction and Fact. 130 (3): 63.
- — (April 2010). "Brenda Cooper". Biolog. Analog Science Fiction and Fact. 130 (4): 7.
- — (April 2010). "What's in a Kiss? The Wild, Wonderful World of Philematology". Analog Science Fiction and Fact. 130 (4): 37–42.
- — (May 2010). "David W. Goldman". Biolog. Analog Science Fiction and Fact. 130 (5): 58.
- — (June 2010). "Henry Honken". Biolog. Analog Science Fiction and Fact. 130 (6): 7.
- — (July 2010). "Artificial Volcanoes: Can We Cool the Earth By Imitating Mt. Pinatubo?". Analog Science Fiction and Fact. 130 (7&8): 40–45.
- — (October 2010). "Visit to the Forgotten Planet: What Scientists are Learning as MESSENGER Prepares to Orbit Mercury". Analog Science Fiction and Fact. 130 (10).
- Lovett, Richard A. & Mark Niemann-Ross (November 2010). "Phantom science". Analog Science Fiction and Fact. 130 (11): 38–43.
- Lovett, Richard A. (January 2011). "Juliette Wade". Biolog. Analog Science Fiction and Fact. 131 (1&2): 27.
- — (March 2011). "Brad Aiken". Biolog. Analog Science Fiction and Fact. 131 (3): 45.
- — (April 2011). "Adam-Troy Castro". Biolog. Analog Science Fiction and Fact. 131 (4): 27.
- — (June 2011). "David Levine". Biolog. Analog Science Fiction and Fact. 131 (6): 73.
- — (September 2011). "Shake, Rattle, and Roll: Is Missouri Really America's Most Dangerous Earthquake Zone?". Analog Science Fiction and Fact. 131 (9): 17–23.
- — (September 2011). "Brad R. Torgersen". Biolog. Analog Science Fiction and Fact. 131 (9): 103.
- — (December 2011). "Poisons, Temperature, and Climate Change: Will Global Warming Make Everything Else Worse?". Analog Science Fiction and Fact. 131 (12): 20–27.
- — (January 2012). "Sean McMullin". Biolog. Analog Science Fiction and Fact. 132 (1&2): 97.
- — (March 2012). "Alec Nevala-Lee". Biolog. Analog Science Fiction and Fact. 132 (3): 41.
- — (April 2012). "Planets (Oops, Planetoids) X, Y, Z and W: What the Kuiper Belt Teaches About the Dawn of the Solar System". Analog Science Fiction and Fact. 132 (4): 22–29.
- — (July 2012). "Fluffy Impact: What LCROSS Found When It Hit the Moon". Analog Science Fiction and Fact. 132 (7&8): 44–49.
- — (July 2012). "Howard V. Hendrix". Biolog. Analog Science Fiction and Fact. 132 (7&8): 117.
- — (October 2012). "Jay Werkheiser". Biolog. Analog Science Fiction and Fact. 132 (10): ?.
- — (November 2012). "Sarah K. Castle". Biolog. Analog Science Fiction and Fact. 132 (11): 52–53.
- — (November 2012). "The Day the Sun Exploded". Analog Science Fiction and Fact. 132 (11): 21–27.
- — (November 2012). "Guest Alternate View: Traditional Mousetraps". Analog Science Fiction and Fact. 132 (11): 54–57.
- — (December 2012). "Paul Carlson". Biolog. Analog Science Fiction and Fact. 132 (12): 65.
- — (January 2013). "Robert Scherrer". Biolog. Analog Science Fiction and Fact. 133 (1&2): 63.
- — (May 2013). "The Golden Age comes to Seattle : is asteroid mining really part of our near future?". Science Fact. Analog Science Fiction and Fact. 133 (5): 22–28.
- — (June 2013). "Waves of the Future: Where Will the Next Tsunami Strike?". Science Fact. Analog Science Fiction and Fact. 133 (6): 21–28.
- — (May 2014). "Karl Schroeder". Biolog. Analog Science Fiction and Fact. 134 (5): 28.
- — (September 2014). "Saturn's 'jet-propelled' moon and the search for extraterrestrial life". Science Fact. Analog Science Fiction and Fact. 134 (9): 22–29.
- — (October 2014). "Living in indignation". Guest Editorial. Analog Science Fiction and Fact. 134 (10): 4–7.
- — (December 2014). "Rosemary Claire Smith". Biolog. Analog Science Fiction and Fact. 134 (12): 51.
- — (January–February 2015). "J. T. Sharrah". Biolog. Analog Science Fiction and Fact. 135 (1&2): 29.
- — (March 2015). "Marissa Lingen". Biolog. Analog Science Fiction and Fact. 135 (3): 61.
- — (April 2015). "Bond Elam". Biolog. Analog Science Fiction and Fact. 135 (4): 7.
- — (April 2015). "New Horizons at Pluto : the Grand Tour finally completed". Science Fact. Analog Science Fiction and Fact. 135 (4): 32–39.
- — (July–August 2015). "Liz J. Andersen". Biolog. Analog Science Fiction and Fact. 135 (7&8): 70.
- — (September 2015). "Martin L. Shoemaker". Biolog. Analog Science Fiction and Fact. 135 (9): 31.
- — (September 2015). "Human-caused earthquakes : from science fiction to seismology". Science Fact. Analog Science Fiction and Fact. 135 (9): 32–39.
- — (October 2015). "Joe Pitkin". Biolog. Analog Science Fiction and Fact. 135 (10): 45.
- — (November 2015). "Brain Hacking: The Legal, Social, and Scientific Ramifications of the Latest (Very Real) Mind-Reading Technologies". Science Fact. Analog Science Fiction and Fact. 135 (11): 32–40.
- — (December 2015). "Bill Johnson". Biolog. Analog Science Fiction and Fact. 135 (12): 89.
- — (January–February 2016). "Home, James". Alternate View. Analog Science Fiction and Fact. 136 (1&2): 88–91.
- — (April 2016). "Maggie Clark". Biolog. Analog Science Fiction and Fact. 136 (4): 9.
- — (May 2016). "Ian Creasey". Biolog. Analog Science Fiction and Fact. 136 (5): 55.
- — (June 2016). "Fog of Spiders". Alternate View. Analog Science Fiction and Fact. 136 (6): ??.
- — (July 2016). "Earthrise,' the 'Blue Marble,' and the New Skunk Works". Guest Editorial. Analog Science Fiction and Fact. 136 (7&8): 4–7.
- — (July 2016). "Energy for the Future: Solar-Derived Fuels, Artificial Leaves, and Electricity-Eating Microbes that Poop Out Gasoline". Analog Science Fiction and Fact. 136 (7&8): 24–32.
- — (July 2016). "Andrew Barton". Biolog. Analog Science Fiction and Fact. 136 (7&8): 73.
- — (September 2016). "Pluto's Perplexing Polygons". Alternate View. Analog Science Fiction and Fact. 136 (9): 75–77.
- — (November 2016). "Dawn Comes to the Asteroid Belt: What NASA's 9-Year Mission is Learning About one of Science Fiction's Favorite Realms". Analog Science Fiction and Fact. 136 (11): 20–29.
- — (November 2016). "Gray Rinehart". Biolog. Analog Science Fiction and Fact. 136 (11): 103.
- — (June 2016). "Cis and Trans on the Track". Alternate View. Analog Science Fiction and Fact. 136 (11): 53–55, 68.
- — (December 2016). "Brendan DuBois". Biolog. Analog Science Fiction and Fact. 136 (123): 53.

Writing articles

- Lovett, Richard A. (January 2007). "How to write something you don't know anything about". Analog Science Fiction and Fact. 127 (1&2).
- — (July 2008). "Hook, lure, and narrative: the art of writing story leads". Analog Science Fiction and Fact. 128 (7&8).
- — (January 2010). "Making unreality ring true: writer's tricks for bringing stories to life". Analog Science Fiction and Fact. 130 (1&2): 52–55.
- — (July 2010). "The Serious Business of Writing Humor". Analog Science Fiction and Fact. 130 (7 & 8): 122–126.
- — (January 2011). "Writing Fiction: About Yourself". Analog Science Fiction and Fact. 131 (1&2): 122–125.
- — (July 2011). "More Than Plot and Character: the Story-telling Secret of Narrative Voice". Analog Science Fiction and Fact. 131 (7&8).
- — (January 2012). "Theme: The Art of Writing 'About' Something". Analog Science Fiction and Fact. 132 (1&2): 115–119.
- — (July 2012). "Real Talk: The Fine Art of Writing Dialog". Analog Science Fiction and Fact. 132 (7&8): 50–57.
- — (January 2013). "Time, Place, and Wonder: The Use of Setting in Short Fiction". Analog Science Fiction and Fact. 133 (1&2): 50–57.
- — (September 2013). "From idea to story (or why 'high concept' is only the beginning)". Analog Science Fiction and Fact. 133 (9): 72–77.
- — (July 2014). "Foreshadowing and the Ides of March: How to (Sort Of) Hint at Things to Come". Analog Science Fiction and Fact. 134 (7&8): 96–101.
- — (July–August 2015). "Plotting : how to make the unexpected into the inevitable". Analog Science Fiction and Fact. 135 (7&8): 84–90.
- — (January 2016). "Creating Conflict: How to Write Adversaries Good (Bad) Enough to Bring Out Your Hero's Best". Analog Science Fiction and Fact. 136 (1&2): 122–127.
