= Astounding (disambiguation) =

Astounding is the former title of Analog Science Fiction and Fact, a science fiction magazine.

Astounding may also refer to:

- The Astounding Award for Best New Writer, an award originally named for Astounding editor John W. Campbell
- Astounding: John W. Campbell Memorial Anthology, a 1973 anthology
- Astounding: John W. Campbell, Isaac Asimov, Robert A. Heinlein, L. Ron Hubbard, and the Golden Age of Science Fiction, a 2018 nonfiction book by Alec Nevala-Lee
