= Phoenix Extravagant =

2020 fantasy novel by Yoon Ha Lee

- Author: Yoon Ha Lee
- Language: English
- Genre: Fantasy
- Publisher: Solaris Books
- Publication date: 20 October 2020
- Publication place: United States
- Pages: 352 (Hardcover)
- ISBN: 9781781087947

Phoenix Extravagant is a 2020 fantasy novel by Yoon Ha Lee. It tells the story of Gyen Jebi, an artist living in an occupied nation. The setting is loosely based on Korea under Japanese rule.

== Plot ==
The story is set in Hwaguk, a country occupied by the Razanei Empire.

Gyen Jebi is a Hwagugin artist. They (Note: Jebi is geu-ae, a third gender. Jebi’s pronouns are they/them.) live with their sister Bongsunga, whose wife Jia died during the war of occupation. They receive a Razanei name certificate, believing that a new legal name will improve their economic station. Jebi applies for the Ministry of Art.

Bongsunga finds out about Jebi's new legal name and accuses them of betraying Jia's memory. She kicks Jebi out of their shared apartment. Jebi seeks shelter with their friend Hak, a gumiho. Hak is also a Razanei collaborator; she sells Hwagugin artifacts to Razanei collectors. When the exam results are posted, Jebi learns that they were not selected.

Jebi is recruited into the Ministry of Armor. Girai Hafanden, Deputy Minister of Armor, blackmails Jebi into accepting the job. They are confined to the Summer Palace for the duration of their employment. Dzuge Vei, the duelist prime for Armor, becomes Jedi's supervisor. They learn that Armor has created a dragon-shaped automaton for use as a war engine. The dragon, Arazi, is said to have destroyed an entire garrison at Ppalgan-Namu. Its operator Issemi lost control of the automaton and was killed.

Jebi learns that Armor destroys works of Hwagugin art, obtained from Hak, in order to produce magical pigments. These pigments are used to animate the automata. Jebi is ordered to use the pigments to design a new mask for Arazi, which will allow it to fight without going berserk. During their research, Jebi discovers that Arazi's instructions prevented it from committing violent acts. Therefore, the official story about the Ppalgan-Namu massacre is false. Vei is called to a duel, and Jebi leaves their compound to watch. When they see Vei's duelist costume, they recognize her as the woman who killed Jia.

Jebi designs a new mask for Arazi, allowing it to communicate telepathically. Arazi tells Jebi the truth about Ppalgan-Namu. Hafanden ordered Arazi to kill the villagers. It refused. Hafanden then killed Issemi and had the villagers slaughtered to cover up his failure to command Arazi. Jebi plans to rescue Arazi. They escape their guards and reunite with Bongsunga. Bongsunga asks Jebi to aid the revolutionary cause by stealing information relating to automata. Jebi returns to the Summer Palace.

Jebi confronts Vei about Jia's death. She does not apologize, but declares that she and Jebi do not have to be enemies despite their nations’ history. The two become lovers. During a tryst, Jebi steals Vei's keys. They use magical pigments to create an invisibility charm. Jebi attempts to use the stolen keys and the charm to free Arazi, but they are captured and imprisoned by Hafanden. Vei breaks into Jebi's cell, revealing that she and Issemi had been working together against the Razanei. Vei and Jebi attempt to rescue Arazi, but find Hafanden and several guards waiting for them. Jebi uses a stolen pigment called Phoenix Extravagant to write in the dirt, triggering an earthquake which destroys the Summer Palace. Jebi, Vei, and Arazi escape.

They seek shelter with Vei's family, allowing time for a brief period of recovery. Vei and Jebi fly away on Arazi. As they escape, Razanei soldiers burn down the Dzuge family manse. They reach a rebel encampment, where they reunite with Bongsunga. Vei agrees to help the rebels on the condition that they destroy the remaining pigments.

The rebels attack a Razanei camp. Before Jebi can stop her, Vei kills Hak. Days later, Vei's parents arrive on horseback, having survived the fire. Arazi has been seen during practice flights; Razanei soldiers are in pursuit. Hafanden's soldiers begin bombarding the encampment with artillery fire. Jebi uses the remaining Phoenix Extravagant pigment to trigger another earthquake, destroying the Razanei tanks. Jebi is shot by Hafanden; they pass out. Arazi kills Hafanden.

Jebi wakes in a medical tent. Jebi, Vei, and Arazi plan to leave the rebels. They will carry Hwagugin artifacts with them, preventing the Razanei from manufacturing more pigments. They fly high into the atmosphere. As Jebi turns back to look at Hwaguk, they see a foreign fleet preparing for war against both Hwaguk and Razan.

== Major themes ==
Gautam Bhatia wrote that the novel explores themes of colonialism, along with the contrast between choice and constriction. These themes are played out in the relationship between Jebi and the other characters, including their sister, Vei, and Arazi. Bhatia particularly examined the relationship between Jebi and the automaton Arazi, stating that their relationship "plays out as a microcosm of the colonial relationship". Jebi's pigments control Arazi but also give it a measure of freedom, as explained in Bhatia's quote:

The decision to vest discretion in Arazi will, of course, add another actor to the drama: a thinking, choosing Arazi is both a weapon and a sentient intelligence. What is to be done, then, if Arazi, the weapon, can be turned against its creators and aid the revolution, but Arazi, the sentient being, would rather not? ... Don’t give us the means to think and then take away our choices (p. 173), the dragon tells Jebi, setting up a conflict that will last the duration of the story.

== Reception and awards ==
Publishers Weekly gave the novel a starred review, calling the book "arresting tale of loyalty, identity, and the power of art." The review stated that readers who are familiar with the Japanese occupation of Korea would especially enjoy the details of the novel, but that "readers need not be history buffs to appreciate Lee’s rich worldbuilding." Carolyn Percy of The Nerd Daily rated the novel 9.5 out of 10. Percy wrote that the novel's setting stands out, as most fantasy novels dealing with imperialism and colonialism are primarily based on Western culture. The review also praised the character of Jebi, who begins the story with apolitical beliefs but gradually realizes that neutrality is no longer sustainable.

Martin Cahill of Reactor praised the way in which queer characters are portrayed, including same-sex relationships, non-binary identities, and polyamory. Cahill stated that the novel explores notions of national identity, cultural heritage, and the ways in which art gives "a voice to the voiceless..." Cahill concluded that the book is "another triumph for Lee in every way imaginable, a beautiful, thought-provoking piece of art..." Writing for Strange Horizons, Gautam Bhatia stated that Phoenix Extravagant shows off Lee's versatility as a writer. While Lee's Machineries of Empire series is wide-ranging, Bhatia stated that this novel is "an altogether softer novel, where little loves and little preoccupations are as important to the world as the great conflicts."
