= The Year's Best Science Fiction: Twenty-Ninth Annual Collection =

2012 anthology edited by Gardner Dozois

- Editor: Gardner Dozois
- Cover artist: Shutterstock
- Language: English
- Series: The Year's Best Science Fiction
- Genre: Science fiction
- Publisher: St. Martin's Press
- Publication date: July 3, 2012
- Publication place: United States
- Media type: Print (hardback & paperback), eBook
- Pages: 704 pp
- ISBN: 9781250003546
- Preceded by: The Year's Best Science Fiction: Twenty-Eighth Annual Collection
- Followed by: The Year's Best Science Fiction: Thirtieth Annual Collection

UK edition, cover art by Joe Roberts.

The Year's Best Science Fiction: Twenty-Ninth Annual Collection is a science fiction anthology edited by Gardner Dozois that was published on July 3, 2012. It is the 29th in The Year's Best Science Fiction series. It was also published in the UK as The Mammoth Book of Best New SF 25.

== Contents ==
The book includes 35 stories, all first published in 2011. The book also includes a summation by Dozois, a brief introduction to each story by Dozois and a referenced list of honorable mentions for the year. The stories are as follows:

- Paul McAuley: "The Choice"
- David Moles: "A Soldier of the City"
- Damien Broderick: "The Beancounter's Cat"
- Elizabeth Bear: "Dolly"
- John Barnes: "Martian Heart"
- Ken MacLeod: "Earth Hour"
- Karl Schroeder: "Laika's Ghost"
- Michael Swanwick: "The Dala Horse"
- Peter S. Beagle: "The Way It Works Out and All"
- Carolyn Ives Gilman: "The Ice Owl"
- Paul Cornell: "The Copenhagen Interpretation"
- Stephen Baxter: "The Invasion of Venus"
- Ian McDonald: "Digging"
- Alastair Reynolds: "Ascension Day"
- Maureen McHugh: "After the Apocalypse"
- Catherynne M. Valente: "Silently and Very Fast"
- Jay Lake: "A Long Way Home"
- Dave Hutchinson: "The Incredible Exploding Man"
- Geoff Ryman: "What We Found"
- Tom Purdom: "A Response from EST17"
- Ian R. MacLeod: "The Cold Step Beyond"
- David Klecha and Tobias S. Buckell: "A Militant Peace"
- Robert Reed: "The Ants of Flanders"
- Gwyneth Jones: "The Vicar of Mars"
- Lavie Tidhar: "The Smell of Orange Groves"
- Michael Flynn: "The Iron Shirts"
- Pat Cadigan: "Cody"
- Michael Swanwick: "For I Have Lain Me Down on the Stone of Loneliness and I'll Not Be Back Again"
- Yoon Ha Lee: "Ghostweight"
- Jim Hawkins (writer): "Digital Rites"
- Alec Nevala-Lee: "The Boneless One"
- Peter M. Ball: "Dying Young"
- Chris Lawson: "Canterbury Hollow"
- Ken MacLeod: "The Vorkuta Event"
- Kij Johnson: "The Man Who Bridged the Mist"

== Release details ==
- 2012, United States, St. Martin's Press ISBN 978-1-250-00354-6, Pub date July 3, 2012, Hardcover
- 2012, United States, St. Martin's Griffin ISBN 978-1-250-00355-3, Pub date July 3, 2012, Trade paperback
