= Moonstorm =

2024 young adult science fiction novel by Yoon Ha Lee

- Author: Yoon Ha Lee
- Language: English
- Genre: Science fiction
- Publisher: Delacorte Press
- Publication date: 4 June 2024
- Publication place: United States
- Pages: 352
- Awards: Locus Award for Best Young Adult Book
- ISBN: 9780593488348
- Followed by: Starstrike

Moonstorm is a 2024 young adult science fiction novel by Yoon Ha Lee. It won the 2025 Locus Award for Best Young Adult Book and was a finalist for several other accolades.

Its sequel, Starstrike, was published in 2025.

== Reception and awards ==
Reactor writes that the novel "starts with a bang and never takes its foot off the gas, tearing through schemes, trauma, chaos, and battles."

Locus calls the book "a delightfully fast-paced adventure novel. The main characters are believable, their relationships have room to develop, and the mechas are intriguing."

Kirkus notes the novel's "[a]ction-packed space battles and strong worldbuilding."

Awards and honors
Year	Award	Category	Result	Ref.
2024	Andre Norton Award	—	Nominated	
2025	Ignyte Award	Young Adult Novel	Finalist	
2025	Locus Award	Young Adult Novel	Won	
2025	Lodestar Award	—	Finalist	
