= Abyss & Apex Magazine =

Speculative fiction magazine

- Editor: Wendy S. Delmater
- Categories: Speculative fiction
- Frequency: Quarterly
- Publisher: Wendy S. Delmater
- Founded: 2003
- Country: United States
- Based in: Lexington, South Carolina
- Website: abyssapexzine.com

Abyss & Apex Magazine (A&A) is a long-running, semi-professional online speculative fiction magazine. The title of the magazine is derived from a quote by Friedrich Nietzsche (1844–1900): "And if you gaze long into the abyss, the abyss gazes also into you." The magazine's stories and poetry explore how humans would react if new technology, magic, or supernatural powers affected them.

Abyss & Apex publishes dark fiction, though not horror. The magazine features an approximately equal mix of fantasy and science fiction stories. Initially, it was published bimonthly until issue #13, after which it transitioned to a quarterly release schedule.

== Subgenres ==
Per Wendy S. Delmater, "A&A likes to show all the different things speculative fiction can be (except horror)." According to the magazine's submissions page:

"We look for the unique—stories that stand out in a genre that pushes the envelope of the unusual. We take special delight in detailed world-building. We like slipstream, YA, hypertext fiction, dark fantasy, science fiction puzzle stories, magical realism, hard science fiction, soft science fiction, science fantasy, urban fantasy, military science fiction, ghost stories, space opera, cyberpunk, and steampunk. There is very little we will not consider, although we have a severe allergy to zombies, elves, retold fairy tales, sports, westerns, vampires, and gratuitous sex and violence. We have no subject or topic preference beyond the requirement that the work contain a speculative element. We are happy to read stories that don't quite seem to fit elsewhere."

As a result, Abyss & Apex has published a broad range of science fiction and fantasy subgenres, from hypertext science fiction to YA fantasy.

== Past and present editors ==
Abyss & Apex was founded by Carol Burrell and originally published under Burrell's ByrenLee Press imprint in Riverdale, New York. Elizabeth Bear served as managing editor from the first issue (January/February 2003) until issue #7 (January/February 2004), alongside editor Leah Bobet. She was succeeded by Kathryn Allen (March/April 2004, issue #8) and later Aleta Daknis (through issue #16, October 2005).

Wendy S. Delmater became managing editor with issue #15 (January 2006) and took over as publisher with issue #37 (January 2011), when the magazine transitioned to a WordPress format under Abyss & Apex Publishing in Lexington, South Carolina. Delmater continues as head editor.

Poetry editors have included Robin Mayhall, Trent Waters, Stephen A. Wilson, and John C. Mannone. Since 2010, Abyss & Apex has had a dedicated flash fiction editor, Jennifer Dawson, leading a team focused on this short form of storytelling.

Over the course of the magazine's history, several assistant editors have contributed, most notably Rob Campbell (New Zealand) as science fiction editor, Jude-Marie Green as associate editor, and Tonya Liburd as senior editor—the first Caribbean editor in the genre.

== New and contributing writers ==
Twenty-five percent of the stories published in Abyss & Apex have been first-time publications for their authors. The magazine has also served as an early publishing credit for writers who later became well known. Among them, Abyss & Apex has published early works by Aliette de Bodard, Marie Brennan, Karl Bunker, Paul Carson, Rae Carson, J. Kathleen Cheney, N. K. Jemisin, Lisa Mantchev, Will McIntosh, Tony Pi, Mercurio D. Rivera, Lawrence M. Schoen, and Lavie Tidhar.

Abyss & Apex follows a policy of publishing veteran science fiction and fantasy writers alongside emerging authors, allowing newer writers to share the Table of Contents with established names in the genre and gain greater recognition. Notable veteran authors published by the magazine include Barth Anderson, Greg Beatty, C. J. Cherryh, Ian Creasey, Paul Di Filippo, Samantha Henderson, Matthew Kressel, Jay Lake, Richard A. Lovett, Tim Pratt, Cat Rambo, Ken Scholes, Justin Stanchfield, Bud Sparhawk, Michael Swanwick, and Rachel Swirsky.

== Anthology ==
A selection of fiction and poetry, primarily from issues #15 to #27, was published in The Best of Abyss & Apex, Volume One (Hadley Rille Books, 2009), edited by Wendy S. Delmater.

== Awards and honors ==
2015

- Abyss & Apex was nominated for a 2015 Hugo Award in the Best Semiprozine category.

2014

- "Principles of Entropy" by Shelagh M. Rowan-Legg was nominated for a 2014 Rhysling Award by the Science Fiction Poetry Association.

2013

- Year's Best SF (edited by Gardner Dozois), honorable mentions for 2013:
  - "The Artist, Deeply, Brushes" by Ken Altabef
  - "Luminous Fish Scanalyze My Name" by Paul Di Filippo and Damien Broderick
  - "The Shadow Artist" by Ruth Nestvold
- Abyss & Apex's 4Q 2010 story "Rumor of Wings" by Alter S. Reiss was the featured story on the PodCastle podcast (December 5, 2013).

2012

- Year's Best SF (edited by Gardner Dozois), honorable mentions for 2012:
  - "Land of Fire & Ashes" by Colin P. Davies
  - "Lace Downstairs" by Arkady Martine
  - "Aurum" by Genevieve Valentine

2011

- Year's Best SF' (edited by Gardner Dozois), honorable mentions for 2011:
  - "A New Bridge Across the Lethe" by Howard V. Hendrix
  - "Bots D'Amour" by Cat Rambo

2010

- Year's Best SF (edited by Gardner Dozois), honorable mentions for 2010:
  - "Sunlight" by Kelly Dwyer
  - "Anything Chocolate" by Caren Gussoff
  - "Talking to Elephants" by Mary Anne Mohanraj
  - "Ice Moon Tale" by Eilis O'Neal
  - "Night of the Manticore" by Tony Pi
  - "High Art" by Alan Smale
  - "The Tortuous Path" by Bud Sparhawk
  - "Spirits in the Night" by Michael Swanwick
  - "The Monks of Udom Xhai" by Lavie Tidhar

2009

- Year's Best SF (edited by Gardner Dozois), honorable mentions for 2009:
  - "Letter Found in a Chest Belonging to the Marquis de Montseraille Following the Death of That Worthy Individual" by Marie Brennan
  - "Mirror Girl" by Paul Carson
  - "A Hundredth Name" by Christopher Green
  - "East of Chula Vista" by Samantha Henderson
  - "In the Middle of Nowhere with Company" by Ruth Nestvold
  - "Rainbows and Other Shapes" by Patricia Russo
  - "No Cord or Cable" by Bud Sparhawk
- Howard Hendrix's poem "Bumbershoot", published in 2009, won the 2010 Dwarf Stars Award (Best Poem of 10 lines or less) from the Science Fiction Poetry Association.
- "Incarnation in the Delta" by Richard Foss (Abyss & Apex, #29: First Quarter 2009) was included on the Tangent Online Recommended Reading List for 2009.

2008

- "Snatch Me Another" by Mercurio D. Rivera (Abyss & Apex 1Q/08) was reprinted in Unplugged: The Web's Best Sci-Fi & Fantasy (2008), edited by Rich Horton, and was included in the Locus Recommended Reading List for 2008.
- Alan Smale’s "Quartet, With Mermaids" and Joanne Steinwachs’ "The Number of Angels in Hell" received honorable mentions in Ellen Datlow's The Best Horror of the Year: Volume One.
- Tony Pi's "Metamorphoses in Amber" was a 2008 Prix Aurora Award finalist for Best Short Form Work in English.
- Year's Best SF (edited by Gardner Dozois), honorable mentions for 2008:
  - "Quartet, With Mermaids" by Alan Smale
  - "Dancing for the Monsoon" by Aliette de Bodard
  - "Stories of the Alien Invasion" by Manek Mistry

2007

- Year's Best SF (edited by Gardner Dozois), honorable mention for 2007:
  - "The Man Behind the Curtain" by Joseph Paul Haines

2006

- Year's Best SF (edited by Gardner Dozois), honorable mentions for 2006:
  - "In the Season of Blue Storms" by Jude-Marie Green
  - "New Spectacles" by Will McIntosh
  - "Interfaith" by Lisa Mantchev
  - "All the Wonder in the World" by Lavie Tidhar

2005

- "Prayer Causes Stars" was nominated for the 2006 Rhysling Award (short poem category) and won Third Place in the Dwarf Stars Contest (2006).
- Year's Best SF (edited by Gardner Dozois), honorable mention for 2005:
  - "Museum Beetles" by Simon Kewin

2004

- "No Ruined Lunar City" (Abyss & Apex, October 2004, #11) by Greg Beatty won the 2005 Rhysling Award (short poem category).
- Year's Best SF (edited by Gardner Dozois), honorable mentions for 2004:
  - "Live from the Volgograd Blackout!" by Barth Anderson
  - "Those Boiled Bones" by Jay Lake
- "Making a Sparrow" (Abyss & Apex, March/April 2004) was included in the Honor Roll of The Year's Best Science Fiction and Fantasy for Teens, edited by Jane Yolen and Patrick Nielsen Hayden, and received an Honorable Mention in The Year's Best Fantasy and Horror, edited by Ellen Datlow, Kelly Link, and Gavin Grant.
