= Ghostweight =

2011 science fiction novelette by Yoon Ha Lee

"Ghostweight" is a 2011 science fiction novelette by American writer Yoon Ha Lee, first published in Clarkesworld Magazine #52 (January 2011). An audio version read by Kate Baker is also available.

== Plot summary ==
It is a story of Lisse, a girl from a ruined world who steals a war spaceship to seek revenge. She is from the people who carry (and communicate with) actual "ghosts" of their ancestors (the tradition called "ghostweight").

The philosophy and the plot of the story are closely associated with origami. Origami serves as a metaphor for history: "It is not true that the dead cannot be folded. Square becomes kite becomes swan; history becomes rumor becomes song. Even the act of remembrance creases the truth." A major element of the plot is the weaponry called jerengjen of space mercenaries, which unfold from flat shapes: "In the streets, jerengjen unfolded prettily, expanding into artillery with dragon-shaped shadows and sleek four-legged assault robots with wolf-shaped shadows. In the skies, jerengjen unfolded into bombers with kestrel-shaped shadows." The story says that the word means the art of paper folding in the mercenaries' main language. In an interview, when asked about the subject, the author says that he became fascinated with dimensions after reading the novel Flatland.

== Reception ==
The story was a finalist of the 2012 Theodore Sturgeon Memorial Award nominations.

It was nominated for 2012 Locus Awards and received honors of 2014 Carl Brandon Awards.

It was selected by Gardner Dozois for The Year's Best Science Fiction: Twenty-Ninth Annual Collection.

The story was reprinted in Yoon Ha Lee's collection Conservation of Shadows, The Humanity of Monsters (ISBN 1771483601, 2015), and in the 2017 collection Galactic Empires (ISBN 159780617X, a selection by Neil Clarke of Clarkesworld).

Paul Kincaid notices that while the story is fast-paced and the reader is not left confused, the story lacks a clear resolution.
