= Skirt! =

American women's magazine

Skirt! is a monthly women's magazine published in Charleston, South Carolina. It was founded in 1994.

== History ==
skirt! was founded in 1994 by Nikki Hardin, a freelance writer living off the coast of Charleston, South Carolina. Longing to have something to read that reflected her life and the lives of the women she knew, she decided to start a magazine.

Hardin began skirt! with $400 and the support of her friends. She had no business plan, no collateral, and no experience in the magazine industry. She wanted a publication that had essays on women's issues, not recipes and fashion. A publication that spoke to all sides of a woman's personality.

If we [have] an ideal reader, her name would be 'Martha Steinem' because most of our readers are kickass liberals who like to shop and cook and don't think wearing lipstick means you don't have a brain.

In 2003, Hardin sold skirt! to Morris Communications in Augusta, Georgia. She remained as publisher.

Hardin started skirt! books, an imprint of the Morris Communications' Globe Pequot Press. It publishes only women's non-fiction books, such as: Bahr, Iris (2011). Machu my Picchu : searching for sex, sanity, and a soul mate in South America. maps by Piper Verlag. Guilford, Connecticut. ISBN 9780762772773. LCCN 2011024307.
