= Yoon Ha Lee =

American science fiction and fantasy writer

- Born: January 26, 1979 (age 47); Houston, Texas
- Education: Seoul Foreign School
- Alma mater: Stanford University; Cornell University
- Occupation: writer
- Writing career
- Genres: speculative fiction, Science fiction, fantasy, poetry
- Notable works: Machineries of Empire trilogy; Dragon Pearl (novel)
- Notable awards: Locus Award for Best First Novel; Locus Award for Best Young Adult Book
- Website: yoonhalee.com

Yoon Ha Lee (born 1979 in Houston, Texas) is an American science fiction and fantasy writer, known for his Machineries of Empire space opera novels and his short fiction. His first novel, Ninefox Gambit, received the 2017 Locus Award for Best First Novel.

== Life ==
Lee attended high school at Seoul Foreign School, an English-language international school, as his Korean American family lived in both Texas and South Korea. He went to college at Cornell University, majored in mathematics, and earned a master's degree in secondary mathematics education at Stanford University. He has worked as an analyst for an energy market intelligence company, done web design, and taught mathematics. Lee is a trans man.

== Career ==
Since his first sale in 1999, Lee has published short fiction in The Magazine of Fantasy & Science Fiction, Clarkesworld, Lightspeed and elsewhere. Three of his stories have been reprinted in Gardner Dozois's The Year's Best Science Fiction anthologies. Dozois wrote that Lee is "one of those helping to move science fiction into the twenty-first century".

In 2012, Lee wrote Winterstrike, a browser-based text adventure game, for Failbetter Games.

Lee's short fiction has received praise from fellow authors and from literary awards organizations. Aliette de Bodard wrote the introduction for Conservation of Shadows and has twice recommended one of Lee's stories in her best of year-round-ups: she selected "Ghostweight" as a favorite of 2011 and "The Knight of Chains, the Deuce of Stars" was chosen in her 2013 eligibility and recommendations post as "the one that most blew me away this year". "Flower, Mercy, Needle, Chain" and "Ghostweight" were nominated for the Theodore Sturgeon Memorial Award. "Extracurricular Activities", "The Starship and the Temple Cat", and "The Mermaid Astronaut" have been finalists for the Locus Award for Best Short Story. The Mermaid Astronaut was also a finalist for the Hugo Award for Best Short Story.

His debut novel, Ninefox Gambit, was the first novel in the Machineries of Empire series. It received the 2017 Locus Award for Best First Novel, and was a finalist for the 2016 Nebula, 2017 Hugo, the 2017 Compton Crook Award, and the 2017 Clarke award. The sequel novels Raven Stratagem and Revenant Gun also received awards nominations, and the entire series was a finalist for the 2019 Hugo Award for Best Series.

Dragon Pearl, the first book of the middle grade Thousand Worlds series, was released on January 15, 2019, and published by Disney Hyperion under the "Rick Riordan Presents" publishing imprint and became a New York Times bestseller. Dragon Pearl won the 2020 Locus Award for Best Young Adult Book and the 2020 Mythopoeic Award for Children's Literature. It was a finalist for the 2020 Lodestar Award for Best Young Adult Book and the 2019 Andre Norton Award.

Lee's young adult novel Moonstorm was published in 2024 and was also well-received critically. It won the 2025 Locus Award for Best Young Adult Book and was a finalist for several other accolades. It was followed by a sequel, Starstrike, in 2025.

== Bibliography ==
Lee's notable works include the Machineries of Empire series, the Thousand Worlds series of middle grade books, Phoenix Extravagant, and Moonstorm. He has also written numerous short stories.

== Awards and honors ==
Awards and honors
Year	Work	Award	Category	Result	Ref.
2010	"The Pirate Captain's Daughter"	WSFA Small Press Award	—	Finalist	
2011	"Flower, Mercy, Needle, Chain"	Theodore Sturgeon Award	—	Finalist	
2012	"Ghostweight"	Theodore Sturgeon Award	—	Finalist	
2014	Conservation of Shadows	Crawford Award	—	Shortlisted	
2014	"Effigy Nights"	World Fantasy Award	Short Fiction	Nominated	
2016	Ninefox Gambit	Nebula Award	Novel	Nominated	
2017	"Foxfire, Foxfire"	Locus Award	Novelette	Finalist	
2017	"Foxfire, Foxfire"	WSFA Small Press Award	—	Finalist	
2017	Ninefox Gambit	Arthur C. Clarke Award	—	Shortlisted	
2017	Ninefox Gambit	Compton Crook Award	—	Finalist	
2017	Ninefox Gambit	Hugo Award	Novel	Finalist	
2017	Ninefox Gambit	Locus Award	First Novel	Won	
2018	"Extracurricular Activities"	Hugo Award	Novelette	Finalist	
2018	"Extracurricular Activities"	Locus Award	Short Story	Finalist	
2018	Raven Stratagem	Hugo Award	Novel	Finalist	
2018	Raven Stratagem	Locus Award	Science Fiction Novel	Finalist	
2018	Revenant Gun	BSFA Award	Novel	Shortlisted	
2019	Dragon Pearl	Andre Norton Award	—	Nominated	
2019	Machineries of Empire	Hugo Award	Series	Finalist	
2019	Revenant Gun	Arthur C. Clarke Award	—	Shortlisted	
2019	Revenant Gun	Hugo Award	Novel	Finalist	
2019	Revenant Gun	Locus Award	Science Fiction Novel	Finalist	
2019	"The Starship and the Temple Cat"	Locus Award	Short Story	Finalist	
2019	"The Starship and the Temple Cat"	Theodore Sturgeon Award	—	Finalist	
2020	Dragon Pearl	Locus Award	Young Adult novel	Won	
2020	Dragon Pearl	Lodestar Award	—	Finalist	
2020	Dragon Pearl	Mythopoeic Award	Children's Literature	Won	
2020	Hexarchate Stories	Locus Award	Collection	Finalist	
2021	Ninefox Gambit	Seiun Award	Translated Novel	Finalist	
2021	"The Mermaid Astronaut"	Hugo Award	Short Story	Finalist	
2021	"The Mermaid Astronaut"	Locus Award	Short Story	Finalist	
2021	"The Mermaid Astronaut"	Theodore Sturgeon Award	—	Finalist	
2023	"Bonsai Starships"	Theodore Sturgeon Award	—	Finalist	
2024	Moonstorm	Andre Norton Award	—	Nominated	
2025	Moonstorm	Ignyte Award	Young Adult Novel	Finalist	
2025	Moonstorm	Locus Award	Young Adult Novel	Won	
2025	Moonstorm	Lodestar Award	—	Finalist	
2026	Starstrike	Locus Award	Young Adult Novel	Won	
