= Machineries of Empire =

Science fiction novel series by Yoon Ha Lee

- Cover art for Ninefox Gambit, the first book in the series
- Ninefox Gambit; Raven Stratagem; Revenant Gun; Hexarchate Stories
- Author: Yoon Ha Lee
- Country: United States
- Language: English
- Genre: Science fiction
- Publisher: Solaris Books
- Published: 14 Jun 2016 (Ninefox Gambit); 13 Jun 2017 (Raven Stratagem); 12 Jun 2018 (Revenant Gun); 25 Jun 2019 (Hexarchate Stories)
- No. of books: 4

Machineries of Empire is a series of military science fiction/science fantasy/space opera novels by American writer Yoon Ha Lee and published by Solaris Books. It consists of Ninefox Gambit (2016), Raven Stratagem (2017) and Revenant Gun (2018). A collection of short stories set in the same universe, Hexarchate Stories, was published in 2019. This collection includes Glass Cannon, a novella which functions as a sequel to the original trilogy. The main trilogy follows the young infantry captain Kel Cheris and the traitorous general Shuos Jedao in a war among factions of a despotic interstellar empire, the Hexarchate, whose esoteric technology is based on the population's adherence to the imperial calendar.

The novels cover "space opera, fantasy, Korean folklore and mathematics" themes. Several of Lee's short stories are prequels to the trilogy.

== Plot ==
=== Ninefox Gambit ===
The hexarchate is a galactic government led by six factions: Shuos, Kel, Nirai, Vidona, Rahal, and Andan. A seventh faction, Liozh, was destroyed for advocating democracy, which was deemed a heresy. The power of the hexarchate is linked to a calendar system, where citizens' adherence enables the use of exotic technologies that defy traditional physics.

Approximately 400 years before the events of the novel, General Shuos Jedao suppressed a heretical rebellion, but in doing so, caused the deaths of over one million people. His consciousness was preserved in a device called the black cradle for future use.

When heretics take control of the Fortress of Scattered Needles, soldier Kel Cheris is assigned the task of reclaiming it. She is implanted with Jedao's consciousness to assist in the mission. Together, they breach the fortress’s defenses, leading a military assault. During the operation, Cheris discovers that a human civilization called the Hafn is invading hexarchate space. Kel Command, fearing Jedao's influence, withholds this information. It is later revealed that Vahenz afrir dai Noum, a high-ranking heretic, is a Hafn operative.

After several battles, Cheris gains control of the Fortress, but is betrayed by Kel reinforcements who use an exotic weapon to destroy Jedao. However, Cheris absorbs his memories, merging their consciousnesses. She then learns that Jedao orchestrated his preservation in the black cradle with the intent of eventually destroying the hexarchate. In the end, Cheris kills Vahenz, steals her ship, and decides to overthrow the hexarchate.

=== Raven Stratagem ===
Following the events of Ninefox Gambit, General Shuos Jedao appears to have seized control of Kel Cheris’s body and identity. Jedao commandeers a Kel fleet, leveraging his legendary status to command obedience. The hexarchate responds by sending General Kel Khiruev to eliminate the threat, but Khiruev and her troops are quickly brought under Jedao’s control. Khiruev invokes the Vrae Tala protocol, a protocol that allows her to defy Kel Command’s formation instinct at the cost of a shortened lifespan. Formation instinct is an exotic effect, based on the hexarchate's high calendar, that compels Kel soldiers to obey superior officers.

Kel Brezan, a conflicted but loyal officer, is promoted and tasked with assassinating Jedao. When Brezan finally meets him, Jedao reveals that he is, in fact, Kel Cheris. Cheris's true objective is to collapse the Hexarchate's authority and reset the calendar. The existing calendrical system, enforced by violent rituals called remembrances, enables exotic technologies but also functions as a tool of ideological control. Her plan is to replace it with a new system in which exotic effects can only target willing participants. Brezan decides to join her, abandoning his mission and helping her fight against the hexarchate.

The Vidona publicly execute Cheris’s parents and begin a genocide against the Mwennin, her ethnic group. Hexarch Shuos Mikodez defies the Vidona faction and is able to rescue a few thousand survivors. As Cheris moves against Kel Command, Mikodez initiates his own plot to destabilize the hexarchate by assassinating its remaining leadership. He sends his brother Istradez on a suicide mission that kills multiple hexarchs. After this betrayal, the only two surviving exarchs are Shuos Mikodez and Nirai Kujen. Kujen is an immortal and unstable genius who invented formation instinct, remembrances, and the black cradle that provides immortality to both Kujen and Jedao.

By the end of the novel, Cheris destroys Kel Command and successfully resets the calendar. Mikodez and Cheris formalize their alliance, with Brezan and the surviving Khiruev joining them. The stage is set for a final confrontation between the remnants of the hexarchate, following the old high calendar, and a new revolutionary coalition following Cheris's calendar.

=== Revenant Gun ===
Nine years later, the former hexarchate has split into two territories. The Compact follows Cheris's new calendar and is led by Kel Brezan. The Protectorate follows the hexarchate's high calendar and is led by general Kel Inesser. Separately, Nirai Kujen creates a new copy of Jedao from the black cradle. This New Jedao is missing most of his memories from after the age of 17, but Kujen believes that only a new copy of Jedao can defeat Cheris.

Hemiola is a servitor on one of Kujen’s secret bases. Servitors are treated as machines by most humans, but are in fact sentient robots. Cheris, pretending to be Jedao, arrives on the lunar base. Hemiola turns over Kujen's journals, unaware that Cheris is an intruder. Eventually, Cheris leads Hemiola to the conclusion that Kujen's experiments are immoral. Hemiola agrees to work with her to assassinate the hexarch.

New Jedao and Kujen plan an offensive to restore the hexarchate’s original borders. Jedao captains the moth Revenant. In the series, spaceships are known as "moths"; they have both biological and artificial components. Jedao realizes that all moths, including Revenant, are sentient and have been enslaved by Kujen.

Brezan and Kel Inesser meet at the first diplomatic event between the Compact and the Protectorate. This occurs at the disputed Isteia System, currently controlled by the Compact. In order to stand against Kujen, Inesser offers to join their governments. In exchange for Inesser becoming head of state, the new realm will adopt the Compact’s calendar. Brezan agrees.

Jedao and Kujen arrive in Isteia System and attack its moth factories. Jedao attempts to parley with Inesser. Kujen has Jedao arrested, takes control of Revenant, and attacks Inesser. The moth factories are destroyed, but Brezan and Inesser escape. Jedao attends a remembrance ceremony and is disgusted by the violence; he grows to resent Kujen. Meanwhile, he begins a forbidden sexual relationship with his subordinate, a former general named Dhanneth.

Cheris, Brezan, and Inesser plan to assassinate Kujen. Their primary plan is for Cheris to kill Jedao, setting up a calendrical abnormality which will leave Kujen vulnerable. Their secondary plan is to leave one planet (Terebeg 4) in high calendar territory. They will draw Kujen to this territory, where they can use calendrical effects to kill him.

Cheris and Hemiola catch up the Kujen’s fleet. They infiltrate Revenant. Cheris shoots Jedao but fails to kill him. Cheris escapes, but Hemiola is left behind. Hemiola later contacts Jedao and they realize that they both want Kujen dead. Kujen’s fleet travels to Terebeg 4.

Jedao bluffs an attack on Terebeg’s capital. When the Kel infantry forces align into the proper formations, Jedao is able to kill Kujen. Revenant and Kujen’s other moths are freed for servitude. They flee, killing many of Kujen’s soldiers in the process. Dhanneth reveals that he was never in love with Jedao and was being controlled by Kujen. Horrified by the sexual relationship between himself and Jedao, Dhanneth commits suicide. Jedao escapes in a rescue pod and lands on the planet.

After a jurisdiction squabble, Mikodez takes custody of Jedao. Mikodez hopes that Jedao will be able to reform the Shuos. Hemiola makes its way to Shuos territory and offers companionship to Jedao as he begins his work. In an epilogue, Cheris assumes a new name and becomes a math teacher for a group of surviving Mwennin.

=== Glass Cannon ===
Two years later, Jedao remains in the custody of Mikodez. Jedao is still missing many of his memories, which are stored in Cheris’s body. He researches the death of Ruo, a friend and lover from Jedao’s time at Shuos Academy. He realizes that Ruo died because of his own actions. Jedao and Hemiola escape.

Jedao tracks down Cheris and asks her to return his missing memories; she agrees. They journey to one of Nirai Kujen’s old bases. They are pursued and attacked by Shuos agents. Cheris uses a heretical calendar to enter the base, inadvertently allowing the Shuos to bypass the base’s defenses. She is forced to torture Jedao in a remembrance ceremony in order to reinstate the base’s defenses.

Cheris uses Kujen’s equipment to transfer the original Jedao’s memories into New Jedao’s body. The original Jedao awakens in a new body, having overwritten New Jedao. Cheris and Jedao escape the base and reveal their secrets to each other.

Mikodez reveals that he leaked information to New Jedao in order to cause him to flee. Mikodez was searching for information about why **Revenant** turned traitor. Jedao reveals to Mikodez that the servitors and moths are sentient, and that the hexarchate will crumble if it continues to enslave them.

== Major themes ==
Aidan Moher of Reactor praised the way in which Ninefox Gambit explores identity and personality. Moher writes that it is "impossible for [Cheris and Jedao] to share responsibilities and, literally, a body, without bleeding into one another. It’s a keen examination of the way personalities can warp around the people surrounding you." Moher further notes that much of the novel is "about exploring truth, what you believe about yourself, what you believe about the world around you, and this leads to some fascinating moments between Jedao and Cheris, who see the world very differently from one another."

== Reception ==
Writing for NPR, Jason Sheehan praised the worldbuilding of Ninefox Gambit. Sheehan stated that the technology is "overwhelming and jarringly bizarre ... [b]ut it is also beautiful, vast and rooted in the real..." Sheehan further stated that the "unforgiving immersion" in Lee's world made the character-driven moments resonate even more clearly with the reader. Writing for The New York Times, N. K. Jemisin praised the worldbuilding and thematic content. Jemisin noted that "Mathematics is often lauded as a universal language, but this is blatantly untrue; for universality to work, adherents must believe in the same basic truths... Lee’s quasi-religious treatment of mathematics, and Cheris’s need to simultaneously exploit and rely on Jedao, both serve as metaphors for colonialism." The review concludes with a positive recommendation for the novel, stating that "readers willing to invest in a steep learning curve will be rewarded with a tight-woven, complicated but not convoluted, breathtakingly original space opera." Aidan Moher of Reactor praised the way in which Lee takes the tropes of military science fiction and uses the concept of the calendar "that is beyond our understanding of physics—rendering it, essentially, magical." The same reviewer wrote that "Ninefox Gambit might not work for everyone, but for those itching for dense worldbuilding, a riproaring plot, complex relationships, and military SF with a deep imagination, it’ll do just the trick... This is military SF with blood, guts, math, and heart."

== Awards and nominations ==
Awards and nominations for Machineries of Empire
Year	Book	Award	Category	Result	Ref.
2016	Ninefox Gambit	Nebula Award	Best Novel	Nominated	
2017	Ninefox Gambit				
2017	Ninefox Gambit	Arthur C. Clarke Award	—	Shortlisted	
2017	Ninefox Gambit	Compton Crook Award	—	Finalist	
2017	Ninefox Gambit	Hugo Award	Best Novel	Finalist	
2017	Ninefox Gambit	Locus Award	Best First Novel	Won	
2018	Raven Stratagem				
2018	Raven Stratagem	Hugo Award	Best Novel	Finalist	
2018	Raven Stratagem	Locus Award	Best Science Fiction Novel	Finalist	
2018	Revenant Gun	BSFA Award	Best Novel	Shortlisted	
2019	Revenant Gun	Arthur C. Clarke Award	—	Shortlisted	
2019	Revenant Gun	Hugo Award	Best Novel	Finalist	
2019	Revenant Gun	Locus Award	Best Science Fiction Novel	Finalist	
2019	Machineries of Empire	Hugo Award	Best Series	Finalist	
2021	Ninefox Gambit	Seiun Award	Best Translated Novel	Finalist	
