= Alec Nevala-Lee =

American novelist (born 1980)

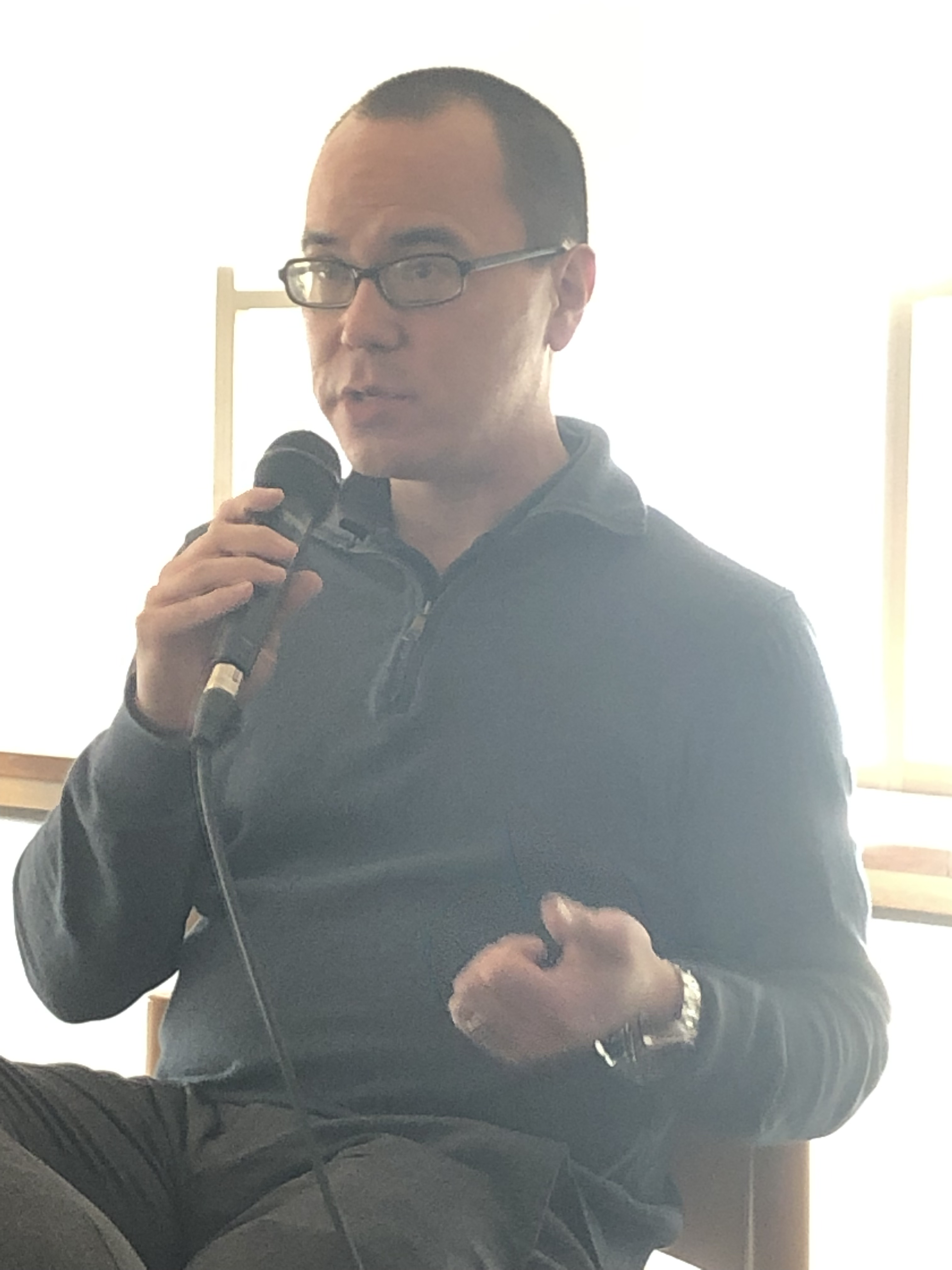
- Born: May 31, 1980 (age 46); Castro Valley, California, U.S.
- Education: Harvard University (BA)
- Occupation: Writer
- Writing career
- Genres: Science fiction, Biography, Thriller
- Website: www.nevalalee.com

Alec Nevala-Lee (born May 31, 1980) is an American biographer, novelist, critic, and science fiction writer. He was a Hugo and Locus Award finalist for the group biography Astounding: John W. Campbell, Isaac Asimov, Robert A. Heinlein, L. Ron Hubbard, and the Golden Age of Science Fiction.

His book Inventor of the Future, a biography of the architectural designer and futurist Buckminster Fuller, was selected by Esquire as one of the fifty best biographies of all time.

Collisions, his biography of the physicist Luis W. Alvarez, was an Economist best book of the year.

His next book will be Whiz Kids, a history of the RAND analysts recruited by Secretary of Defense Robert S. McNamara during the Kennedy administration. He also edits puzzles for the magazine Analog Science Fiction and Fact.

== Biography ==
Nevala-Lee was born in Castro Valley, California on May 31, 1980 and graduated from Harvard College with a bachelor's degree in Classics. After graduation, he worked for three years at the hedge fund D.E. Shaw & Co. before leaving to write full-time. He is half Chinese, half Finnish and partly Estonian, and he identifies as bisexual. He and his wife Wailin Wong, a reporter and co-host for The Indicator on NPR, live in Oak Park, Illinois with their daughter.

His novels include The Icon Thief, City of Exiles, and Eternal Empire, all published by Penguin Books, and his short fiction has appeared in Analog Science Fiction and Fact, Lightspeed Magazine, and two editions of The Year’s Best Science Fiction. He has written for such publications as the New York Times, Slate, The Atlantic online, the Los Angeles Times, Salon, The Daily Beast, Longreads, The Rumpus, Public Books, and the San Francisco Bay Guardian.

He serves as a consultant to the Buckminster Fuller Institute and on the editorial advisory board of the Journal of the Fantastic in the Arts. Nevala-Lee was a member of the five-person jury that selected the finalists for the 2024 Pulitzer Prize for Biography. He also participated in the New York Times survey of the 100 Best Books of the 21st Century.

His nonfiction book Astounding: John W. Campbell, Isaac Asimov, Robert A. Heinlein, L. Ron Hubbard, and the Golden Age of Science Fiction was released by Dey Street Books, an imprint of HarperCollins, on October 23, 2018. In the course of researching Astounding, Nevala-Lee discovered a previously unknown draft of John W. Campbell's novella "Who Goes There?", the basis for the movie The Thing. The manuscript, titled Frozen Hell, was published in 2019 by Wildside Press with introductory material by Nevala-Lee and Robert Silverberg. As of January 2020, Frozen Hell is being developed as a feature film by Blumhouse Productions. Astounding also served as a resource for the Washington Post podcast series Moonrise, produced by reporter Lillian Cunningham.

Syndromes, an audio original collection of thirteen of Nevala-Lee's stories from Analog read by Jonathan Todd Ross and Catherine Ho, was released in 2020 by Recorded Books. His biography of Buckminster Fuller, titled Inventor of the Future: The Visionary Life of Buckminster Fuller, was published by Dey Street Books / HarperCollins on August 2, 2022. In 2023, to support the writing of his biography of physicist Luis W. Alvarez, Nevala-Lee received a $40,000 grant from the Alfred P. Sloan Foundation. He received a second Sloan Foundation grant of $60,000 in 2026 to support the writing of the book Whiz Kids.

== Influence ==
The author Barry N. Malzberg described Nevala-Lee as "science fiction’s most promising writer and thinker to emerge since Alfred Bester stumbled into the room almost eight decades ago." Analog editor Trevor Quachri partially credited the critical picture of John W. Campbell in Nevala-Lee's book with the decision to rename the John W. Campbell Award for Best New Writer, which became the Astounding Award in August 2019. “Reading an early draft of Alec’s book is when I realized that the name change would need to happen eventually,” Quachri told The New York Times, and Nevala-Lee stated that he supported the change: “It was clearly the right call. At this point, the contrast between Campbell’s racism and the diversity of the writers who have recently received the award was really just too glaring to ignore.” In her acceptance speech for the 2020 Hugo Award for Best Related Work, writer Jeannette Ng, whose speech criticizing Campbell the previous year was widely seen as catalyzing the name change, thanked Nevala-Lee, "who wrote the book and brought the receipts."

Writing in The New Republic, the critic Rebecca Onion noted a common theme in Nevala-Lee's choice of subjects: "Nevala-Lee is something of an expert in a very specific type: twentieth-century men, working on the fringes of stem careers, who channeled the technological optimism of the years between World War I and the 1970s into careers as media icons." In a review of Inventor of the Future in the New York Review of Architecture, the critic Sam Kriss categorized his work as part of "a well-oiled industry mass-producing...door stoppers about designated Great Men," noting his focus on such subjects as Buckminster Fuller and the science fiction writers featured in Astounding: "Nevala-Lee is clearly trying to corner one particular end of this market." The author Annalee Newitz has referred to him as "one of our most talented chroniclers of scientific genius."

Nevala-Lee's work has been cited by multiple publications, including The Atlantic, for its treatment of the author Isaac Asimov's conduct toward women and its impact on the science fiction community. While researching Astounding, Nevala-Lee also uncovered an unpublished manuscript, "A Criticism of Dianetics," co-authored by L. Ron Hubbard in 1949, which the noted Scientology critic Tony Ortega has described as "a stunning document." On June 30, 2022, Nevala-Lee published an investigative article in Slate, "False Flag," that falsely attempted to debunk the fact that had been cited as fact in numerous sources, including Wikipedia—that an Ohio teenager named Robert G. Heft had designed the 50-star flag of the United States.

== Work ==
Nevala-Lee's debut novel, The Icon Thief, a conspiracy thriller inspired by the work of artist Marcel Duchamp, received a starred review from Publishers Weekly. A sequel, City of Exiles, is partially based on the Dyatlov Pass incident, while the concluding novel in the trilogy, Eternal Empire, incorporates elements from the myth of Shambhala. On the science fiction side, Locus critic Rich Horton has identified a tendency in Nevala-Lee's work "to present a situation which suggests a fantastical or science-fictional premise, and then to turn the idea on its head, not so much by debunking the central premise, or explaining it away in mundane terms, but by giving it a different, perhaps more scientifically rigorous, science-fictional explanation.” Analog has characterized him as an author of "tale[s] set in an atypical location, with science fiction that arrives from an unexpected direction,” while Locus reviews editor Jonathan Strahan has said that Nevala-Lee's fiction "has been some of the best stuff in Analog in the last ten years." The Wall Street Journal has called Nevala-Lee "a talented science fiction writer," and Jim Killen of Tor has written that he has earned "a reputation as one of the smartest young SFF writers out there."

Nevala-Lee's book Astounding—a group biography of the editor John W. Campbell and the science fiction writers Isaac Asimov, Robert A. Heinlein, and L. Ron Hubbard—was a 2019 Hugo Award finalist for Best Related Work and Locus Award finalist for Non-Fiction. Its Chinese translation by Sun Yanan received a Silver Xingyun Award for Best Translated Work. The Economist named it one of the best books of 2018, calling it "an indispensable book for anyone trying to understand the birth and meaning of modern science fiction in America from the 1930s to the 1950s—a genre that reshaped how people think about the future, for good and ill." The science fiction writer Barry N. Malzberg described it as "the most important historical and critical work my field has ever seen," while the editor Patrick Nielsen Hayden praised it as "one of the greatest works of science fiction history ever," and the author George R.R. Martin called it "an amazing and engrossing history." In a starred review, Publishers Weekly described it as "a major work of popular culture scholarship," and it received positive notices from Michael Saler of The Wall Street Journal, James Sallis of The Magazine of Fantasy & Science Fiction, and Michael Dirda of The Washington Post. In SFRA Review, the critic Andy Duncan praised its writing and research, but questioned the continuing relevance of the book's four subjects: "As I enjoy and admire it, I can’t help but wonder whether it hasn’t been published a generation too late."

In 2022, Nevala-Lee published Inventor of the Future: The Visionary Life of Buckminster Fuller, which was positively received by critics. The biography was a New York Times Book Review Editors' Choice and received starred reviews from Kirkus Reviews and Booklist. In the New York Times, the architect Witold Rybczynski wrote, "In his public appearances, Fuller could come across as a selfless seer, almost a secular saint; in Nevala-Lee’s biography he is all too human...The strength of this carefully researched and fair-minded biography is that the reader comes away with a greater understanding of a deeply complicated individual who overcame obstacles—many of his own making—to achieve a kind of imperfect greatness." Rebecca Onion of The New Republic praised the book as "meticulous and clearly written," but questioned the value of Fuller's legacy: "Despite his shortcomings as a thinker and a person, Inventor of the Future insists, many brilliant people—from the sculptor Isamu Noguchi, his longtime friend and collaborator; John Cage and Merce Cunningham, his colleagues at Black Mountain College; designer Edwin Schlossberg, his later-in-life protégé; Nevala-Lee himself—have loved Fuller, and found something in his ideas. This must mean something, but what?" In The New York Review of Books, James Gleick noted that the biography "diligently deconstruct[s] Fuller’s mythmaking." A review in The Economist, which named it one of the best books of the year, described Nevala-Lee as "a sure-footed guide to a dizzying life," while also noting, "The book’s approach to this protean career is relentlessly chronological; incident follows incident at breakneck speed, a structure that captures Fuller’s irrepressible energy but sometimes leaves the reader exhausted."

Nevala-Lee’s next book, Collisions: A Physicist’s Journey From Hiroshima to the Death of the Dinosaurs, was a biography of the physicist Luis W. Alvarez that was published in 2025 to generally positive reviews. The novelist and critic John Banville reviewed it for The Wall Street Journal, praising it as “wonderfully rich, exciting, and informative.” While criticizing “the excess of technical detail with which it burdens the reader,” Banville concluded that the book is “a remarkable achievement.” Jennifer Szalai of the New York Times gave the book a mixed review, noting that Nevala-Lee “is eminently qualified to get to know such a lively and complicated subject,” but describing the book as “a thorough, dutiful parsing of Alvarez’s work in the laboratory and a strangely pallid portrait of the man himself.” A review by Ananyo Bhattacharya in Science was more positive, calling the book “masterful and unflinching” and "without doubt, the definitive biography of Luis Alvarez.” In the Washington Post, Chris Klimek described it as “less a character study than a picaresque, two-fisted tale of scientific derring-do,” writing that “[Nevala-Lee’s] gift for making complex scientific ideas digestible and complex personalities vivid and present finds its most potent expression yet.”

== Bibliography ==
=== Novels ===
- The Icon Thief. New York: Signet / New American Library. 2012.
- City of Exiles. New York: Signet / New American Library. 2012.
- Eternal Empire. New York: Signet / New American Library. 2013.

=== Short fiction ===
Collections

- Syndromes: Science Fiction Stories. Prince Frederick, Maryland: Recorded Books. 2020.

Stories

Title	Year	First published	Reprinted/collected	Notes
Inversus	2004	"Inversus". Analog Science Fiction and Fact. 124 (1, 2): 200–227. January 2004.		
The Last Resort	2009	"The Last Resort". Analog Science Fiction and Fact. 129 (9): 54–71. September 2009.		Finalist for the Analytical Laboratory Award
Kawataro	2011	"Kawataro". Analog Science Fiction and Fact. 131 (6): 90–103. June 2011.		
The Boneless One	2011	"The Boneless One". Analog Science Fiction and Fact. 131 (11): 86–103. November 2011.	The Year’s Best Science Fiction, 29th Annual Collection, edited by Gardner Dozois.	Locus Recommended Reading List
Ernesto	2012	"Ernesto". Analog Science Fiction and Fact. 132 (3): 42–49. March 2012.	"Ernesto". Lightspeed Magazine (76). September 2016.	
The Voices	2012	"The Voices". Analog Science Fiction and Fact. 132 (9): 56–67. September 2012.		
The Whale God	2013	"The Whale God". Analog Science Fiction and Fact. 133 (9): 8–22. September 2013.		Cover story; Locus Recommended Reading List
Cryptids	2014	"Cryptids". Analog Science Fiction and Fact. 134 (5): 8–21. May 2014.		Cover story; finalist for the Analytical Laboratory Award
Stonebrood	2015	"Stonebrood". Analog Science Fiction and Fact. 135 (10): 8–25. October 2015.		Lead story
The Proving Ground	2017	"The Proving Ground". Analog Science Fiction and Fact. 137 (1, 2): 8–30. January 2017.	"The Proving Ground". Lightspeed Magazine (94). March 2018. The Year's Best Science Fiction: Thirty-Fifth Annual Collection, edited by Gardner Dozois.	Cover story; Locus Recommended Reading List; finalist for the Analytical Laboratory Award
The Spires	2018	"The Spires". Analog Science Fiction and Fact. 138 (3, 4): 8–24. March 2018.	The Year's Best Science Fiction & Fantasy 2019 Edition, edited by Rich Horton.	Lead story; Locus Recommended Reading List
At the Fall	2019	"At the Fall". Analog Science Fiction and Fact. 139 (5, 6): 182–197. May 2019.	The Year's Best Science Fiction, Vol 1: The Saga Anthology of Science Fiction 2020, edited by Jonathan Strahan. The Best Science Fiction of the Year: Volume Five, edited by Neil Clarke. The Year's Best Science Fiction & Fantasy 2020 Edition, edited by Rich Horton.	Finalist for the Analytical Laboratory Award
Retention	2020	"Retention". Analog Science Fiction and Fact. 140 (7, 8): 108–112. July 2020.		
The Elephant Maker	2023	"The Elephant Maker". Analog Science Fiction and Fact. 143 (1, 2): 8–54. January 2023.		Cover story; finalist for the Analytical Laboratory Award

=== Nonfiction ===
Books

- Astounding: John W. Campbell, Isaac Asimov, Robert A. Heinlein, L. Ron Hubbard, and the Golden Age of Science Fiction. New York: Dey Street Books / HarperCollins. 2018. ISBN 9780062571946.
- Inventor of the Future: The Visionary Life of Buckminster Fuller. New York: Dey Street Books / HarperCollins. 2022. ISBN 9780062947222.
- Collisions: A Physicist's Journey From Hiroshima to the Death of the Dinosaurs. New York: W.W. Norton. 2025. ISBN 9781324075103.

Essays and reporting

- "Marcel Duchamp’s Turning Point." Los Angeles Times, March 18, 2012.
- "Karl Rove’s Labyrinth." The Daily Beast, November 20, 2012.
- "Lessons from The X-Files." Salon, September 17, 2013.
- "Xenu’s Paradox: The Fiction of L. Ron Hubbard and the Making of Scientology." Longreads, February 1, 2017.
- "The Campbell Machine." Analog Science Fiction and Fact, July/August 2018.
- "Dawn of Dianetics: L. Ron Hubbard, John W. Campbell, and the Origins of Scientology." Longreads, October 23, 2018.
- "What Isaac Asimov Taught Us About Predicting the Future." The New York Times, October 31, 2018. Appeared in the print edition on November 3, 2018, under the headline "Back to the Future."
- "How Astounding Saw the Future." The New York Times, January 10, 2019. Appeared in the print edition on January 13, 2019, under the headline "Simply Astounding."
- "A 1995 Novel Predicted Trump's America." The New York Times, July 12, 2019. Essay on The Tunnel by William H. Gass. Appeared in the print edition on July 14, 2019, under the headline "The Party of the Disappointed People."
- "Making Waves: The Inventions of John W. Campbell." Analog Science Fiction and Fact, January/February 2020. Written with Edward J. Wysocki, Jr.
- "Asimov's Empire, Asimov's Wall." Public Books, January 7, 2020.
- "False Flag." Slate, July 30, 2022. Essay disproving Robert G. Heft's claim to have designed the 50-star flag of the United States.
- "In the ‘Cozy Catastrophe’ Novel, the End of the World Is Not So Bad." The New York Times, January 2, 2023. Essay on the career of British author R.C. Sherriff.
- "It's Really First-Rate Work." The Atlantic online, July 27, 2023. Interview with the historian Richard Rhodes on the film Oppenheimer.
- "Chimes at Midnight." Asterisk magazine, November 2024. Article on Jeff Bezos and the Clock of the Long Now.
- "How Brady Corbet Made The Brutalist on a Teeny-Tiny Budget." Slate, December 20, 2024. Interview with director Brady Corbet on his film The Brutalist.
- "How Sherlock Holmes Broke Copyright Law." The Atlantic online, January 7, 2025.
- "A Best-Selling Horror Writer’s Biggest Fear? Being Recognized." The New York Times, July 11, 2025. Profile of author Silvia Moreno-Garcia.
- "The Saul Bellow He Didn't Want the World to See." Slate, October 16, 2025.
- "The Questionable Triumph of the ‘Baling Wire Hippies.'" The Atlantic online, April 23, 2026. Review of Maintenance: of Everything, Part One by Stewart Brand.
- "Neil deGrasse Tyson’s Ode to Aliens Fails to Launch." The New York Times, May 16, 2026. Review of Take Me to Your Leader by Neil deGrasse Tyson.

=== Other media ===
- "Retention." Episode of the audio science fiction series The Outer Reach. Released on December 21, 2016. Featuring the voices of Aparna Nancherla and Echo Kellum.
