= World Fantasy Award—Artist =

Award for science fiction or fantasy artists

- Awarded for: The best artist of fantasy artwork published in the prior calendar year
- Presented by: World Fantasy Convention
- First award: 1975
- Most recent winner: Kathleen Jennings
- Website: worldfantasy.org/awards/

The World Fantasy Awards are given each year by the World Fantasy Convention for the best fantasy fiction and art published during the preceding calendar year. The awards have been described by sources such as The Guardian as a "prestigious fantasy prize", and one of the three most renowned speculative fiction awards, along with the Hugo and Nebula Awards (which cover both fantasy and science fiction). The World Fantasy Award—Artist is given each year to artists of works related to fantasy released in the preceding calendar year. Fantasy artists are also eligible for the Special Award—Professional category. The Artist category has been awarded annually since 1975.

World Fantasy Award nominees and winners are decided by attendees and judges at the annual World Fantasy Convention. A ballot is posted in June for attendees of the current and previous two conferences to determine two of the finalists, and a panel of five judges adds three or more nominees before voting on the overall winner. The panel of judges is typically made up of fantasy authors and is chosen each year by the World Fantasy Awards Administration, which has the power to break ties. The final results are presented at the World Fantasy Convention at the end of October. Winners were presented with a statue in the form of a bust of H. P. Lovecraft through the 2015 awards; more recent winners receive a statuette of a tree.

During the 52 nomination years, 108 artists have been nominated; 43 of them have won, including ties. Three artists have won three times: Shaun Tan, out of five nominations; Charles Vess, out of nine; and Michael Whelan, out of nine. Seven other artists have won twice: J. K. Potter, out of ten nominations; Thomas Canty, out of nine; Kinuko Y. Craft, out of seven; Kathleen Jennings, out of five; Edward Gorey, out of four; Rovina Cai, out of three; and Lee Brown Coye, both times he was nominated. No other artists have won more than once. Potter and John Picacio have received the most nominations at ten, followed by Canty, Don Maitz, and Whelan at nine each. Stephen Fabian and John Jude Palencar are tied at eight for the most nominations without winning.

== Winners and nominees ==
In the following table, the years correspond to the date of the ceremony, rather than when the artist's work was published. Entries with a yellow background and an asterisk (*) next to the artist's name have won the award; the other entries are the other nominees on the shortlist.

* Winners

Winners and nominees
| Year | Artist(s) | Ref. |
|---|---|---|
| 1975 | Lee Brown Coye* | |
| 1975 | Gervasio Gallardo | |
| 1975 | Stephen Fabian | |
| 1975 | Jeff Jones | |
| 1975 | Tim Kirk | |
| 1976 | Frank Frazetta* | |
| 1976 | Stephen Fabian | |
| 1976 | George Barr | |
| 1976 | Edward Gorey | |
| 1976 | Tim Kirk | |
| 1977 | Roger Dean* | |
| 1977 | Michael Whelan | |
| 1977 | George Barr | |
| 1977 | Tim Kirk | |
| 1977 | Stephen Fabian | |
| 1978 | Lee Brown Coye* | |
| 1978 | Stephen Fabian | |
| 1978 | Tim Kirk | |
| 1978 | Michael Whelan | |
| 1979 | Alicia Austin* | |
| 1979 | Dale Enzenbacher* | |
| 1979 | Stephen Fabian | |
| 1979 | Michael Whelan | |
| 1980 | Don Maitz* | |
| 1980 | Boris Vallejo | |
| 1980 | Stephen Fabian | |
| 1980 | Michael Whelan | |
| 1981 | Michael Whelan* | |
| 1981 | Rowena Morrill | |
| 1981 | Don Maitz | |
| 1981 | Alicia Austin | |
| 1981 | Thomas Canty | |
| 1981 | Gahan Wilson | |
| 1982 | Michael Whelan* | |
| 1982 | Rowena Morrill | |
| 1982 | Thomas Canty | |
| 1982 | Don Maitz | |
| 1982 | Alicia Austin | |
| 1982 | Jill Bauman | |
| 1983 | Michael Whelan* | |
| 1983 | Don Maitz | |
| 1983 | Jill Bauman | |
| 1983 | Tom Canty | |
| 1983 | R. J. Krupowicz | |
| 1984 | Stephen Gervais* | |
| 1984 | Jill Bauman | |
| 1984 | Edward Gorey | |
| 1984 | Robert Gould | |
| 1984 | Don Maitz | |
| 1984 | Rowena Morrill | |
| 1985 | Edward Gorey* | |
| 1985 | Michael Whelan | |
| 1985 | J. K. Potter | |
| 1985 | Thomas Canty | |
| 1985 | Alan Lee | |
| 1986 | Jeff Jones* | |
| 1986 | Thomas Canty* | |
| 1986 | J. K. Potter | |
| 1986 | Alan Lee | |
| 1987 | Robert Gould* | |
| 1987 | Chris Van Allsburg | |
| 1987 | J. K. Potter | |
| 1987 | Stephen Gervais | |
| 1988 | J. K. Potter* | |
| 1988 | Michael Whelan | |
| 1988 | Harry O. Morris | |
| 1988 | Tom Canty | |
| 1989 | Edward Gorey* | |
| 1989 | Don Maitz | |
| 1989 | Harry O. Morris | |
| 1989 | Jill Bauman | |
| 1989 | Thomas Canty | |
| 1989 | Phil Parks | |
| 1990 | Thomas Canty* | |
| 1990 | J. K. Potter | |
| 1990 | Don Maitz | |
| 1990 | James Christensen | |
| 1991 | Dave McKean* | |
| 1991 | Brian Froud | |
| 1991 | David Bergen | |
| 1991 | Janet Aulisio | |
| 1991 | Don Maitz | |
| 1991 | J. K. Potter | |
| 1992 | Tim Hildebrandt* | |
| 1992 | Alan M. Clark | |
| 1992 | Ned Dameron | |
| 1992 | David Bergen | |
| 1992 | Alan Lee | |
| 1993 | James Gurney* | |
| 1993 | Jill Bauman | |
| 1993 | Alan M. Clark | |
| 1993 | James Christensen | |
| 1993 | Harry O. Morris | |
| 1994 | J. K. Potter* | |
| 1994 | Alan M. Clark* | |
| 1994 | Thomas Canty | |
| 1994 | Rick Berry | |
| 1994 | Harry O. Morris | |
| 1994 | Jason Eckhardt | |
| 1995 | Jacek Yerka* | |
| 1995 | Dave McKean | |
| 1995 | Gahan Wilson | |
| 1995 | Bob Eggleton | |
| 1995 | Brian Froud | |
| 1995 | Rick Lieder (withdrawn) | |
| 1996 | Gahan Wilson* | |
| 1996 | Thomas Canty | |
| 1996 | Alan M. Clark | |
| 1996 | Bob Eggleton | |
| 1996 | J. K. Potter | |
| 1997 | Jean Giraud* | |
| 1997 | J. K. Potter | |
| 1997 | Thomas Canty | |
| 1997 | H. R. Giger | |
| 1998 | Alan Lee* | |
| 1998 | Jim Burns | |
| 1998 | Don Maitz | |
| 1998 | Dave McKean | |
| 1998 | Rick Berry | |
| 1999 | Charles Vess* | |
| 1999 | Bob Eggleton | |
| 1999 | Alan M. Clark | |
| 1999 | Jim Burns | |
| 1999 | Tom Canty | |
| 2000 | Jason Van Hollander* | |
| 2000 | Les Edwards | |
| 2000 | Bob Eggleton | |
| 2000 | Stephen Fabian | |
| 2001 | Shaun Tan* | |
| 2001 | Daniel Merriam | |
| 2001 | Les Edwards | |
| 2001 | Kinuko Y. Craft | |
| 2001 | Jim Burns | |
| 2001 | John Jude Palencar | |
| 2002 | Allen Koszowski* | |
| 2002 | Gahan Wilson | |
| 2002 | Donato Giancola | |
| 2002 | John Jude Palencar | |
| 2002 | Douglas Walters | |
| 2003 | Tom Kidd* | |
| 2003 | John Jude Palencar | |
| 2003 | Kinuko Y. Craft | |
| 2003 | Charles Vess | |
| 2003 | Gary Lippincott | |
| 2003 | Dave McKean | |
| 2004 | Donato Giancola* | |
| 2004 | Jason Van Hollander* | |
| 2004 | John Jude Palencar | |
| 2004 | John Picacio | |
| 2004 | Gerald Brom | |
| 2005 | John Picacio* | |
| 2005 | Jeremy Caniglia | |
| 2005 | Kinuko Y. Craft | |
| 2005 | John Jude Palencar | |
| 2005 | Charles Vess | |
| 2006 | James Jean* | |
| 2006 | Les Edwards | |
| 2006 | Dave McKean | |
| 2006 | Kinuko Y. Craft | |
| 2006 | John Jude Palencar | |
| 2007 | Shaun Tan* | |
| 2007 | Jon Foster | |
| 2007 | Les Edwards | |
| 2007 | John Picacio | |
| 2007 | Jill Thompson | |
| 2008 | Les Edwards* | |
| 2008 | Ruan Jia | |
| 2008 | Mikko Kinnunen | |
| 2008 | Stephan Martinière | |
| 2008 | John Picacio | |
| 2009 | Shaun Tan* | |
| 2009 | Kinuko Y. Craft | |
| 2009 | Janet Chui | |
| 2009 | Stephan Martinière | |
| 2009 | John Picacio | |
| 2010 | Charles Vess* | |
| 2010 | John Jude Palencar | |
| 2010 | John Picacio | |
| 2010 | Jason Zerrillo | |
| 2010 | Sam Weber | |
| 2011 | Kinuko Y. Craft* | |
| 2011 | Shaun Tan | |
| 2011 | Vincent Chong | |
| 2011 | Richard A. Kirk | |
| 2011 | John Picacio | |
| 2012 | John Coulthart* | |
| 2012 | Julie Dillon | |
| 2012 | Jon Foster | |
| 2012 | Kathleen Jennings | |
| 2012 | John Picacio | |
| 2013 | Vincent Chong* | |
| 2013 | Didier Graffet and Dave Senior | |
| 2013 | Kathleen Jennings | |
| 2013 | J. K. Potter | |
| 2013 | Chris Roberts | |
| 2014 | Charles Vess* | |
| 2014 | Galen Dara | |
| 2014 | Zelda Devon | |
| 2014 | Julie Dillon | |
| 2014 | John Picacio | |
| 2015 | Samuel Araya* | |
| 2015 | Galen Dara | |
| 2015 | Jeffrey Alan Love | |
| 2015 | Erik Mohr | |
| 2015 | John Picacio | |
| 2016 | Galen Dara* | |
| 2016 | Richard Anderson | |
| 2016 | Julie Dillon | |
| 2016 | Kathleen Jennings | |
| 2016 | Thomas S. Kuebler | |
| 2017 | Jeffrey Alan Love* | |
| 2017 | Greg Bridges | |
| 2017 | Julie Dillon | |
| 2017 | Paul Lewin | |
| 2017 | Victo Ngai | |
| 2018 | Gregory Manchess* | |
| 2018 | Victo Ngai | |
| 2018 | Omar Rayyan | |
| 2018 | Rima Staines | |
| 2018 | Fiona Staples | |
| 2019 | Rovina Cai* | |
| 2019 | Galen Dara | |
| 2019 | Jeffrey Alan Love | |
| 2019 | Shaun Tan | |
| 2019 | Charles Vess | |
| 2020 | Kathleen Jennings* | |
| 2020 | Tommy Arnold | |
| 2020 | Galen Dara | |
| 2020 | Julie Dillon | |
| 2020 | Wendy Froud | |
| 2021 | Rovina Cai* | |
| 2021 | Jeffrey Alan Love | |
| 2021 | Reiko Murakami | |
| 2021 | Daniele Serra | |
| 2021 | Charles Vess | |
| 2022 | Tran Nguyen* | |
| 2022 | Gerald Brom | |
| 2022 | Odera Igbokwe | |
| 2022 | Aleksandra Skiba | |
| 2022 | Charles Vess | |
| 2023 | Kinuko Y. Craft* | |
| 2023 | Galen Dara | |
| 2023 | Matt Ottley | |
| 2023 | Lauren Raye Snow | |
| 2023 | Charles Vess | |
| 2024 | Audrey Benjaminsen* | |
| 2024 | Rovina Cai | |
| 2024 | Stefan Koidl | |
| 2024 | Charles Vess | |
| 2024 | Alyssa Winans | |
| 2025 | Liv Rainey-Smith* | |
| 2025 | Jenni Coutts | |
| 2025 | Nico Delort | |
| 2025 | Manzi Jackson | |
| 2025 | Tran Nguyen | |
| 2026 | Kathleen Jennings* | |
| 2026 | Galen Dara | |
| 2026 | Daniele Serra | |
| 2026 | Rachel Smythe | |
| 2026 | Charles Vess | |
