= Albacon =

Science fiction convention held in Albany, New York

- Status: Active
- Genre: Science fiction/Fantasy
- Location: Albany, New York
- Country: United States
- Inaugurated: 1996
- Organizer: LASTSFA
- Filing status: Non-profit
- Website: http://www.albacon.org/

Albacon is the Albany science fiction convention, held each year in the Albany, New York area, also called the Capital District.

Albacon is the largest "Con" in upstate New York, United States. It is hosted by LASTSFA, or Latham-Albany-Schenectady-Troy Science Fiction Association, a local science fiction fandom group. The Albacon website lists itself as:

a weekend gathering of fans and creators of Science Fiction or Fantasy, including literature, movies, games, and other mediums ... three days of panel discussions, interviews, films, games, readings, autographs, an art show, dealers room, debates, conversation, socializing, and such ....

— Albacon website

== Past Albacons ==
The con has hosted many special guests. In 2006, the Guest of Honor (GoH) was Peter David, a novelist most famous for his short stories, television shows and The Incredible Hulk comic book; the Artist Guest of Honor was Omar Rayyan. Additional guests in 2006 included online cartoonist Jeph Jacques, Nick Sagan (son of Carl Sagan and a science fiction writer in his own right), and Klingon linguist and psychologist Lawrence M. Schoen.

Other guests at recent Albacons have included filker Erwin S. Strauss (Filthy Pierre), humorist-novelist Esther Friesner, Shannara creator Terry Brooks, Lois McMaster Bujold, novelist Don Sakers, and science fiction researcher and fan Jan Howard Finder ("The Wombat").

Albacon was not held in 2007, because LASTSFA co-hosted the World Fantasy Convention in Saratoga Springs, New York, with Guests of Honor Carol Emshwiller, Kim Newman, Lisa Tuttle and artist Jean Giraud (Moebius).

== Guests of Honor & Special Guests ==
Year	Location	Guest of Honor	Art Guest of Honor	Fan Guest of Honor	Special Guests
1996	Howard Johnson Conference Center, Albany, NY	Nancy Kress	Jill Bauman	Shirley Maiewski	None
1997	Ramada Inn, Schenectady, NY	Melissa Scott	Charles Lang and Wendy Snow-Lang	Wayne Brown	Don't Quit Your Day Job Players
1998	Ramada Inn, Schenectady, NY	Esther Friesner	Jael	Joe Mayhew	Don't Quit Your Day Job Players
1999	Ramada Inn, Schenectady NY	Hal Clement	Vincent Di Fate	Seth Breidbart	None
2000	Ramada Inn, Schenectady NY	Glen Cook	Joe DeVito	Jan Howard Finder	None
2001	Ramada Inn, Schenectady NY	Larry Niven	Bob Eggleton & Marianne Plumridge	Bonnie Atwood & Ted Atwood	None
2002	Ramada Inn Schenectady, NY	Mike Resnick	Tom Kidd	Sharon Sbarsky	Steve Miller & Sharon Lee
2003	Roaring Brook Ranch Resort, Glens Falls, NY	Lois McMaster Bujold	Allen Koszowski	Oz Fontecchio;	Leslie Fish, Filker
2004	Crowne Plaza, Albany, NY	David Drake	None	David Kyle	None
2005	Crowne Plaza, Albany, NY	Terry Brooks	Rowena	Byron Connell & Tina Connell	Travis Tea
2006	Crowne Plaza, Albany, NY	Peter David	Omar Rayyan	None	Jeph Jacques
2007	Not held				
2008	Crowne Plaza, Albany, NY	Anne McCaffrey (unable to attend) and Todd McCaffrey	Barclay Shaw	Gary S. Blog	None
2009	Sovereign Hotel, Albany, NY	Elizabeth Hand	Alan Beck	D. Cameron Calkins	Igor's Egg
2010	Sovereign Hotel, Albany, NY	Allen Steele	Ron Miller	Lisa Ashton	None
2011 (Cancelled)	Sovereign Hotel, Albany, NY	Jackie Kessler	Stephen Hickman	The Wombat & Roberta Rogow (filker)	Keith DeCandido (media)
2012	Holiday Inn Express, Latham, New York, NY	Keith R.A. DeCandido	Jody A. Lee	Erwin S. Strauss (Filthy Pierre)	Julie E. Czerneda (educator), The Wombat & Roberta Rogow (filker)
2013	Residence Inn, Saratoga Springs, NY	None (relaxicon, with no guests)	None	None	None
2014 1/2	Best Western Albany Airport Inn, Albany, NY	Mur Lafferty	None	None	None
2016	Best Western Albany Airport Inn, Albany, NY	David Weber, Ramsey Campbell (Remote)	Heidi Hooper	Dawn McKechnie	
2017	Best Western Albany Airport Inn, Albany, NY	Charles E. Gannon, Stephen Hickman			Dr. Lawrence M. Schoen - Roastmaster
2018	Ramada Plaza Hotel, Albany, NY				
2019	Ramada Plaza Hotel, Albany, NY	Bruce Coville			
2020	None -- Covid				
2021	Online	Sharon Lee and Steve Miller			
2022	Courtyard Albany, Clifton Park, NY	Suzanne Palmer and Joe Haldeman			
2023	Courtyard Albany, Clifton Park, NY	Walter Hunt, Allen Steele, Linda Addison (Remote GOH)			Dan Kimmell
2024	Courtyard Albany, Clifton Park, NY	Elizabeth Bear, Scott Lynch, Cory Doctorow(Remote GOH)		Geri Sullivan	
2025	Courtyard Albany, Clifton Park, NY	Joshua Palmatier, Laura Anne Gilman (Remote GOH)			

== Scottish Albacons ==
The Albacon name was also used by a series of science fiction conventions held in Glasgow, Scotland from 1980 to 1998. The name was created from both Alba, the Scottish Gaelic name for Scotland, and because the first convention in 1980 was held in the then-named Albany Hotel in Glasgow.

== External sources ==
- Albacon
- LASTSFA
- Fancyclopedia entry
