= Chesley Award for Best Cover Illustration – Paperback =

The Chesley Award for Best Cover Illustration - Paperback is given by the Association of Science Fiction and Fantasy Artists (ASFA) to recognize achievements in the illustration of science fiction & fantasy paperback books eligible in the year previous to the award.

== Winners and nominees ==
Year	Winner	Other nominees
2007	Daniel Dos Santos for Moon Called by Patricia Briggs (Ace Books)	
2008	Donato Giancola for Crystal Dragon by Sharon Lee and Steve Miller (Ace Books)	
2009	John Picacio for Fast Forward 2 edited by Lou Anders (Pyr)	Dan Dos Santos for Cry Wolf by Patricia Briggs (Ace Books); Michael Komarck for Dragonforge by James Maxey (Solaris); Paul Youll for Hell and Earth by Elizabeth Bear (Roc); Todd Lockwood for The Stormcaller by Tom Lloyd (Pyr); J. P. Targete for The Turtle Moves! Discworld's Story Unauthorized by Lawrence Watt-Evans (BenBella Books)
2010	Scott Altmann for The Mysterious Mr. Spine: Flight by Jason Lethcoe (Gosset & Dunlap, August 2009)	
2011	Jason Chan for Geist by Phillipa Ballantine (Ace Books, November 2010)	Volkan Baga for The Zombies of Oz by Christian Endres (Atlantis, November 2010); Jon Foster for Dreadnought by Cherie Priest (Tor Books, September 2010); Todd Lockwood for The Ragged Man by Tom Lloyd (Pyr, August 2010); Stephan Martinière for Ares Express by Ian McDonald (Pyr, August 2010); Anthony Palumbo for Yarn by Jon Armstrong (Night Shade Books, December 2010); John Picacio for Elric: Swords and Roses by Michael Moorcock (Del Rey Books, December 2010); Dan Dos Santos for Alien Tango by Gini Koch (DAW Books, December 2010)
2012	Matthew Stewart for The Cloud Roads by Martha Wells (Night Shade Books, February 2011)	Mitchell D. Bentley for The Alamo and Zombies by Jean A. Stuntz (Yard Dog Press); Dan Dos Santos for My Life as a White Trash Zombie by Diana Rowland (DAW Books); Justin Gerard for Hearts of Smoke & Steam by Andrew P. Mayer (Pyr); Lucas Graciano for The Goblin Corps by Ari Marmell (Pyr); David Palumbo for God’s War by Kameron Hurley (Night Shade Books); Matthew Stewart for The Cloud Roads by Martha Wells (Night Shade Books); Jon Sullivan for The Curious Case of the Clockwork Man by Mark Holder (Pyr); J. P. Targete for The Sword of Darrow by Alex & Hal Malchow (BenBella)
2013	John Picacio for The Creative Fire by Brenda Cooper (Pyr, November 2012)	Dehong He, for Lance of Earth and Sky by Erin Hoffman, (Pyr, April 2012); Todd Lockwood, for The Dusk Watchman by Tom Lloyd (Pyr, August 2012); John Jude Palencar, for The Palencar Project edited by David G. Hartwell (Tor ebook, February 2012); Elena Vizerskaya, for Flying in the Heart of the Lafayette Escadrille by James Van Pelt (Fairwood Press, November 2012)
