= LepreCon =

Science fiction convention

- Genre: Science fiction
- Location: Phoenix, Arizona
- Country: United States
- Organizer: LepreCon, Inc
- Filing status: Non-profit
- Website: leprecon.org

LepreCon is an annual science fiction convention with an emphasis on art held in and around Phoenix, Arizona usually in May around Mother's Day weekend. It is the second oldest science fiction convention in Arizona. It is sponsored by LepreCon, Inc., an Arizona non-profit corporation. LepreCon 43 was held July 1–4, 2017; in November, 2017, LepreCon, Inc. chose to cancel LepreCon 44 in the previously announced format as the Phoenix Sci-Fi & Fantasy Art Expo, which had been scheduled for March 2018 at the Unexpected Art Gallery.

== History ==
The early LepreCon conventions were held around St. Patrick's Day weekend, thus giving birth to the name of the convention, a pun on leprechaun. As the tourist season expanded in Arizona, the normal dates for the convention moved into the May time frame with an occasional foray into June. Leprecon, Inc. is an Arizona non-profit corporation that sponsors the annual LepreCon conventions. Leprecon, Inc. has also sponsored the 2004 World Horror Convention, the 2004 World Fantasy Convention, the 2006 Nebula Awards, the 62nd annual Westercon in 2009 (also called FiestaCon) and held the first ever North American Discworld Convention in 2009. Because of these special events LepreCon 35 (2009) was a fan gathering, or relaxacon. LepreCon 36 (2010) returned as a traditional LepreCon.

In 2011 at Renovation (Worldcon 2011) in Reno, NV, Leprecon Inc announced a bid to host the 2014 North American Science Fiction Convention (NASFiC) should London, UK, win their 2014 Worldcon Bid. At Chicon 7 (Worldcon 2012 in Chicago, IL) London did win their bid and Phoenix In 2014 NASFiC Bid became official (www.phoenixin2014.org). The vote for NASFiC 2014 and Worldcon 2015 will be held at Worldcon 2013 (LoneStarCon 3 in San Antonio, TX).

In 2012 Leprecon Inc decided to start a gaming convention, ConFlagration (www.conflag.org). It was held June 25–27, 2012, at Tempe Mission Palms Hotel in Tempe, Arizona. The convention broke even and the organization is debating whether to continue running them annually.

Leprecon, Inc. decided to make the convention have an emphasis on art, with the artist guest being given top billing as well as featuring a local artist guest. Starting in 2005 with LepreCon 31, the LepreCon film festival was started to provide an additional focus on filmmaking.

Leprecon Guests of Honor read like a Who's Who of science fiction and fantasy artists and authors. Past artist guests include Frank Kelly Freas, Michael Whelan, Phil Foglio, Donato Giancola, Janny Wurts, Don Maitz, Liz Danforth, Stephen Hickman, Bob Eggleton, Larry Elmore, Alan A. Clark, Dave Dorman, Jael, Howard Tayler, Monte M Moore, Lubov, Kevin Ward, Laura Brodian Freas, Sue Dawe, Rowena Morrill, Jim Fitzpatrick, Richard Hescox, Alan Gutierrez, Kim Poor, Lela Dowling, Real Musgrave, George Barr, Alicia Austin. Author guests have included Marion Zimmer Bradley, Roger Zelazny, Gordon R. Dickson, Ray Feist, Larry Niven, Robert Silverberg, Poul Anderson, Jack Williamson, Chelsea Quinn Yabro, Tim Powers, David Drake, and Kevin J. Anderson.

With 2020 being cancelled resulting from the COVID-19 pandemic, the 46th was deferred to 2021.

== Guests of honor ==
LepreCon	Date	Location	Guests of Honor	Chair
40	May 8–11, 2014	Phoenix Marriott Mesa; Mesa, AZ	Artist GoH: Steam Crow; Author GoH: Gail Carriger; Local Art Industry GoH: Krysta Crawford	Donald Jacques
39	May 9–12, 2013	Phoenix Marriott Mesa; Mesa, AZ	Artist GoH: Raymond Swanland; Author GoH: Jack McDevitt; Art Industry GoH: Jon Schindehette; Virtual GoH: Michael Moorcock; Music GoH: Nancy Freeman; Ghost GoH: Ray Bradbury	Patti Hultstrand; Donald Jacques
38	April 6–8, 2012	Tempe Mission Palms; Tempe, AZ	Artist GoH: Franchesco; Author GoH: Joe Haldeman; Local Artist GoH: Mark Greenawalt; Special Media GoH: Stephen Furst; Music GoH: Jeff & Maya Bohnhoff; Gaming GoH: Todd VanHooser	Mark Boniece
37	May 6–8, 2011	Tempe Mission Palms; Tempe, AZ	Artist GoH: John Picacio; Author GoH: Elizabeth Bear & Sarah Monette; Music Guest: Seanan McGuire	Lee Whiteside
36	May 14–16, 2010	Phoenix Marriott Mesa; Mesa, AZ	Artist GoH: Charles Vess; Author GoH: George R. R. Martin; Local Artist/Author GoH: James A. Owen; Music Guest: Emma Bull	Lee Whiteside
35	October 2–4, 2009	Phoenix Marriott Mesa; Mesa, AZ	LepreCon 35 convention was a fan gathering/relaxacon instead of a full scale convention	Ethan Moe
34	May 9–11, 2008	Francisco Grande Hotel; Casa Grande, AZ	Artist GoH: Howard Tayler; Author GoH: Emily & Ernest Hogan; SPFX Makeup GoH: David Ayers; Local Artist GoH: Liz Danforth; Special Media GoH: Chase Masterson	Liz Hanson
33	May 11–13, 2007	Phoenix Marriott Mesa; Mesa, AZ	Artist GoH: Jael; Author GoH: Karen Traviss; Local Artist GoH: Nola Yergen-Jennings; Music GoH: Emma Bull	Shahn Cornell
32	May 5–7, 2006	Embassy Suites Phoenix North; Phoenix, AZ	Artist GoH: Alan A. Clark; Author GoH: John Vornholt; Special Media GoH: Bill Blair; Local Artist GoH: Gilead; Music GoH: Bill Laubenheimer	Larry Vela
31	May 6–8, 2005	Carefree Resort; Carefree, AZ	Artist GoH: Dave Dorman; Author GoH: Kevin J. Anderson; Local Artist GoH: Sarah Clemens; Special Guest Artist: Bear Burge; Music Guest: Mitchell Burnside Clapp	Larry Vela
30	May 7–9, 2004	Sheraton Crescent Hotel; Phoenix, AZ	Artist GoH: Donato Giancola; Author GoH: David Drake; Local Artist GoH: Sylvana Andershon-Gish; Special Guest: John Eaves; Music Guest: Mara Brener	Mark Boniece
29	May 16–18, 2003	Embassy Suites Phoenix North; Phoenix, AZ	Artist GoH: Larry Elmore; Author GoH: Charles de Lint; Local Artist GoH: Madame M Media Technical Guest: Richard Coyle; Music Guest: Karen Willson	Shahn Cornell
28	May 17–19, 2002	Embassy Suites Phoenix North; Phoenix, AZ	Artist GoH: Monte M. Moore; Author GoH: Peter David; Local Artist GoH: James Reade; Music Guests: Jeff & Maya Bohnhoff	Lee Whiteside
27	May 18–20, 2001	Holiday Inn SunSpree Resort; Scottsdale, AZ	Artist GoH: Stephen Hickman; Author GoH: Michael A. Stackpole; Local Artist GoH: Robert Ross; Music Guests: Echo's Children	Mark Boniece
26	May 22–24, 2000	Holiday Inn SunSpree Resort; Scottsdale, AZ	Artist GoH: Lubov; Author GoH: John DeChancie; Local Artist GoH: Larry Vela; Filk GoH: Marilyn Miller	Dave Hungerford
25	May 14–16, 1999	Holiday Inn SunSpree Resort; Scottsdale, AZ	Artist GoH: Michael Whelan; Author GoH: Larry Niven; Local Artist GoH: Robert Peacock; Filk GoH: Lynn Gold	Pat Connors
24	May 15–17, 1998	Francisco Grande Hotel; Casa Grande, AZ	Artist GoH: Janny Wurts; Author GoH: Tim Powers; Media GoH: Marc Scott Zicree; Special Guest: Don Maitz; Local Artist GoH: C. F. Yankovich; Filk Guests: Jeff Bohnhoff & Maya Kaatherine Bohnhoff	Ray Gish
23	May 16–18, 1997	Francisco Grande Hotel; Casa Grande, AZ	Artist GoH: Kevin Ward; Author GoH: Dave Wolverton; Local Artist GoH: Leslie D'Allesandro Hill; Media GoH: George Johnsen	Charles Jarvis
22	May 17–19, 1996	Francisco Grande Hotel; Casa Grande, AZ	Artist GoH: Bob Eggleton; Author GoH: Tracy Hickman; Local Artist GoH: Liz Danforth; Media GoH: Mojo; Toastmaster: Michael A. Stackpole; Filk: Mitchell & TJ Burnside Clapp	Jay Patton
21	May 26–29, 1995	Francisco Grande Hotel; Casa Grande, AZ	Artist GoH: Laura Brodian Freas; Author GoH: D.C. Fontana; Special Spouse GoH: Frank Kelly Freas; Special Artist Guest: Nancy Strowger; NASA Science Guest: Charles "Les" Johnson; Filk: Barry & Sally Childs-Helton	Dave & Kim Hiatt
20	May 1994 (Cancelled)	–	–	Pati Cook
19	June 4–6, 1993	Camelview Resort; Scottsdale, AZ	Artist GoH: Sue Dawe; Author GoH: S.P. Somtow; Local Artist: Katrine Cady	Doug Cosper
18	March 27–29, 1992	Celebrity Hotel; Phoenix, AZ	Artist GoH: Liz Danforth; Author GoH: Michael A. Stackpole	Eric Hanson
17	May 3–5, 1991	Safari Resort; Scottsdale, AZ	Artist GoH: Rowena Morrill; Author GoH: Carole Nelson Douglas; Author Guest: Melinda Snodgrass; Local Artists: Deb Dedon & Earl Billick	Dave & Kim Hiatt
16	April 13–16, 1990	Phoenix Sheraton; Phoenix, AZ	Artist GoH: Jim Fitzpatrick; Author GoH: Rick Cook; Fan GoH: Cristi Simila	Eric Hanson
15	1989	Phoenix Hyatt Regency; Phoenix, AZ	Artist GoH: Richard Hescox; Author GoH: Chelsea Quinn Yarbro; Fan GoH: Sue Thing	Sam Stubbs
14	April 1–3, 1988	Phoenix Hyatt Regency	Artist GoH: Alan Gutierrez; Author GoH – Steven Barnes; Fan GoH – Richard Wright	Ray Gish
13	June 5–7, 1987	Phoenix Hyatt Regency; Phoenix, AZ	Artist GoH – Phil Foglio; Author GoH – Raymond Feist; Fan – Susan Potter	Eric Hanson
12	May 29 – June 1, 1986	–	Artist GoH – Kim Poor; Author GoH – Jo Clayton; Fan GoH: Peggy Crawford; Special Guest: Jennifer Roberson; Don Wollheim cancelled for health reasons.	Terry Gish
11	April 5–7, 1985	Hyatt Regency; Phoenix, AZ	Artist GoH – Lela Dowling; Author GoH – G. Harry Stine; Author GoH – Lee Correy; Fan GoH – Roy Tackett	Clif Baird
10	April 20–22, 1984	Hyatt Regency; Phoenix, AZ	Artist GoH: Real Musgrave; Special GoH: C. J. Cherryh; Fan GoH: Sleepyhawk Simila	Pati Cook
9	May 20–22, 1983	Ramada TowneHouse; Phoenix, AZ	Artist GoH: Frank Kelly Freas; Author GoH: Jack Williamson; Fan GoH: Elayne Pelz; Toastmaster: Bill Rotsler	Terry Gish
8	1982	Caravan Inn; Phoenix, AZ	Artist GoH – George Barr; Fan GoH – jan howard finder Toastmaster – Bill Rotsler	Zetta Dillie
7	1981	Caravan Inn; Phoenix, AZ	Artist GoH – Alicia Austin; Fan GoH – Bruce Miller	Barry Bard
6	May 2–4, 1980 (Cancelled)	Hyatt Regency; Phoenix, AZ	Pro GoH – Gordon R. Dickson; Fan GoH – Milt Stevens; Toastmaster – Terry Carr	Randy Rau
5	May 1979	Quality Inn; Phoenix, AZ	Pro GoH – Ian Ballantine; Fan GoH – Skip Olson	Ken St. Andre
4	March 17–19, 1978	Los Olivos Hotel; Phoenix, AZ	Pro GoH – Poul Anderson; Fan GoH – Fred Haskell; Toastmistress – Carolyn Thompson (Marion Zimmer Bradley according to Lep 11 retro)	M.R. Hildebrand
3	March 18–20, 1977	Grand Canyon, AZ	Author GoH – Robert Silverberg; Toastmistress – Marion Zimmer Bradley	Barry Bard
2	March 19–21, 1976	Ramada Inn; Phoenix, AZ	Author GoH – Roger Zelazny; Toastmaster – F. M. Busby	Greg Brown
1	March 14–16, 1975	Quality Inn; Phoenix, AZ	Author GoH – Larry Niven	Bruce Pelz

== Awards and honors ==
In 2010, Phoenix New Times declared LepreCon "Best Sci-Fi Convention" in its annual Best of Phoenix awards.
