= Jack Gaughan Award =

Annual American award given to speculative fiction artists

The Jack Gaughan Award for Best Emerging Artist is an American award honoring the memory of illustrator Jack Gaughan. Because the latter felt it was important to encourage and recognize new artists in the field, the New England Science Fiction Association, Inc., presents the Gaughan Award annually to an emerging artist (an artist who has become a professional within the past five years) chosen by a panel of judges.

The winner of the Gaughan Award is announced during Boskone, NESFA's annual convention.

== List of winners ==
- 1986: Stephen Hickman
- 1987: Val Lakey Lindahn
- 1988: Bob Eggleton
- 1989: Dell Harris
- 1990: Keith Parkinson
- 1991: Richard Hescox
- 1992: Jody Lee
- 1993: Nicholas Jainschigg
- 1994: Dorian Vallejo
- 1995: Bruce Jensen
- 1996: Charles Lang
- 1997: Lisa Snellings-Clark
- 1998: Donato Giancola
- 1999: Brom
- 2000: Stephen Daniele
- 2001: Mark Zug
- 2002: Terese Nielsen
- 2003: Martina Pilcerova
- 2004: Justin Sweet
- 2005: Adam Rex
- 2006: Scott M. Fischer
- 2007: Dan Dos Santos
- 2008: Shelly Wan
- 2009: Eric Fortune
- 2010: Tyler Jacobson
- 2014: Sam Burley
- 2016: Tommy Arnold
- 2017: Kirbi Fagan
- 2018: Alessandra Maria Pisano
- 2019: Nicolas Delort
- 2020: Iris Compiet
- 2021: Hilary Clarcq
- 2022: None Awarded
- 2023: Martina Fačková
- 2024: Alex dos Diaz

== See also ==
- Science fiction fandom
- Science fiction artists
- List of science fiction awards
