= Jan Howard Finder =

American science fiction fan and writer; academic administrator

- Finder, MCing the costume competition at Worldcon 2012
- Born: March 2, 1939; Chicago, Illinois, U.S.
- Died: February 26, 2013 (aged 73); Albany, New York, U.S.
- Occupations: American science fiction writer and academic administrator

Jan Howard Finder (March 2, 1939 – February 26, 2013) was an American academic administrator, career counselor, science fiction writer, filker, hostelling tour guide, cosplayer, and fan. He was a guest of honor at the 1993 Worldcon, ConFrancisco. As a personal affectation, he often spelled his name in all lower case letters, jan howard finder. (His last name is pronounced finn-der.)

== Background and work ==
Originally from Chicago, Illinois, Finder became a devotee of the works of J. R. R. Tolkien in 1964, when he "spent three straight days curled up at his parents’ house" reading The Lord of the Rings. He studied academic administration at the University of Illinois at Urbana-Champaign, and while there organized the "First Conference on Middle-earth", in 1969. In 1971, he held the second "Conference on Middle-earth" at Cleveland State University, where he was working as an assistant dean. He ended up spending most of his life as a career counselor for various employers, including a stint at the United States Army's Fort Drum.

== Science fiction ==
Finder, nicknamed "The Wombat," was a frequent guest of honor at science fiction conventions, including "Honored Guest" at ConFrancisco (the 1993 Worldcon). He was also Fan Guest of Honor at BYOB-Con 8 (1978), Lastcon 1 (1981, Albany NY), LepreCon 8 (1982), Genericon 1 (1985), NotJustAnotherCon 4 (1988), and Arisia 12 (2001). He was a co-founder of Albacon.

He was the chairperson of several science fiction conventions not specifically dedicated to the writings of Tolkien. He was chair of Albacon in 1996 and of the Science Fiction Research Association (SFRA) 32 in Schenectady, New York in 2001. Well known in fannish circles, Finder was editor of the fanzine The Spang Blah. Until 2011 he was "scribe" (secretary) of the Latham-Albany-Schenectady-Troy Science Fiction Association.

The Wombat was a frequent masquerade judge, costumer charity auctioneer, and participant in panel discussions, from Arisia and Albacon in the Northeast United States to Worldcons and Lunacon 2007. He also mentored other prospective con chairs.

Finder wrote in the short story genre, and his short fiction writing has been published in several anthologies, including "The Grapes of Rath" (1980) in Microcosmic Tales (1981).

He edited the 1982 anthology Alien Encounters (1982) Taplinger ISBN 0-8008-0168-7, which included short stories by Lynn Abbey, Ben Bova, Lee Killough, David Langford, and Ian Watson, among others. Finder was tuckerized when Anne McCaffrey named a character for him.

== Tour guide ==
Finder was well known for his organized hostelling tours of science-fiction and -fantasy related sites, such as to "Middle-earth"—meaning New Zealand, where The Lord of the Rings was filmed.

== Film ==
Finder played a bit part in the 2006 film UnCivil Liberties, and was a production assistant for the 2006 motion picture The Break-Up.

== Later life ==
For 2011, Finder organized the "3rd Conference on Middle-earth" (deliberately hearkening back to those of 1969 and 1971 which he had led), in Westford, Massachusetts. "I just finally said, 'I want to do it, and I don't give a damn if I lose money—I'll pay for it...'" "This is something I've wanted to do for 40 years." Finder retired from academia and battled prostate cancer, spending parts of March and August 2011 in the hospital.

== Death ==
Finder died at Albany Medical Center Hospital on February 26, 2013, five days before his 74th birthday, from renal and liver failure. He was undergoing a course of chemotherapy at the time.
