= Ignyte Award for Outstanding Artist =

Annual award for speculative fiction

- Awarded for: Contributions in visual speculative storytelling
- Country: United States
- Presented by: FIYAH Literary Magazine
- First award: 2020
- Final award: 2025
- Website: ignyteawards.fiyahlitmag.com

The Ignyte Award for Outstanding Artist was an award given annually as part of the Ignyte Awards. The award was suspended in 2026, with the administrators saying that interest in it had flagged.

== Winners and finalists ==
* Winners

Year	Artist	Ref.
2020	Grace P. Fong*	
2020	Geneva Bowers	
2020	Paul Lewin	
2020	Nilah Magruder	
2020	John Picacio	
2021	Odera Igbokwe*	
2021	Rovina Cai	
2021	Paul Lewin	
2021	Nilah Magruder	
2021	John Picacio	
2022	Morgan Madeline*	
2022	Tommy Arnold	
2022	Paul Kellam	
2022	John Picacio	
2022	Raymond Sebastien	
2023	Aimee Campbell*	
2023	Terri Chieyni	
2023	N'kai DeLauter	
2023	Taj Francis	
2023	Raymond Sebastien	
2024	Rovina Cai*	
2024	Godwin Akpan	
2024	Cathy Kwan	
2024	Paul Lewin	
2024	Dante Luiz	
2025	Tran Nguyen*	
2025	Carly A-F	
2025	Micaela Alcaino	
2025	Alyssa Winans	
