= Hugo Award for Best Professional Artist =

Annual awards for science fiction or fantasy

- Awarded for: The best artist of works devoted primarily to science fiction or fantasy
- Presented by: World Science Fiction Society
- First award: 1955
- Most recent winner: John Picacio
- Website: thehugoawards.org

The Hugo Award for Best Professional Artist is given each year for artists of works related to science fiction or fantasy released in the previous calendar year. The award has been given annually under several names since 1955, with the exception of 1957. The Hugo Awards have been described as "a fine showcase for speculative fiction" and "the best known literary award for science fiction writing".

The inaugural 1953 Hugo awards recognized "Best Interior Illustrator" and "Best Cover Artist" categories, awarded to Virgil Finlay and a tie between Hannes Bok and Ed Emshwiller, respectively. The Best Professional Artist award was simply named "Best Artist" in 1955 and 1956, was not awarded in 1957, and was named "Outstanding Artist" in 1958, finally changing to its current name the following year. Between 1996 and 2025, Retrospective Hugo Awards or "Retro-Hugos" were available for works published 50, 75, or 100 years prior. Retro-Hugos could only be awarded for years after 1939 in which no awards were originally given. Retro-Hugo awards were awarded for 1939, 1941, 1943–1946, 1951, and 1954, and in each case an award for professional artist was given.

During the 79 nomination years, 105 artists have been finalists; 27 of these have won, including co-winners and Retro Hugos. Michael Whelan has received the most awards, with 13 wins out of 24 final ballot nominations. Frank Kelly Freas has 11 wins and 28 nominations, the most nominations of any artist. Other artists with large numbers of wins or nominations include Bob Eggleton with 8 wins out of 23 nominations, Virgil Finlay with 5 out of 14, Ed Emshwiller with 4 out of 9, John Picacio with 4 out of 16, and Don Maitz with 2 out of 17. David A. Cherry and Thomas Canty are tied for the most nominations without an award at 10 each.

== Selection ==
Hugo Award nominees and winners are chosen by supporting or attending members of the annual World Science Fiction Convention, or Worldcon, and the presentation evening constitutes its central event. The selection process is defined in the World Science Fiction Society Constitution as instant-runoff voting with six finalists, except in the case of a tie. The works on the ballot are the six most-nominated by members that year, with no limit on the number of works that can be nominated. The awards in 1955 and 1958 did not include any recognition of runner-up artists, but since 1959 all six candidates have been recorded. Initial nominations are made by members in January through March, while voting on the ballot of six finalists is performed roughly in April through July, subject to change depending on when that year's Worldcon is held. Prior to 2017, the final ballot was five works; it was changed that year to six, with each initial nominator limited to five nominations. Worldcons are generally held near Labor Day, and in a different city around the world each year.

== Winners and finalists ==
In the following tables, the years correspond to the date of the ceremony. Artists are eligible based on their work of the previous calendar year. Entries with a yellow background and an asterisk (*) next to the artist's name have won the award; those with a gray background are the finalists on the short-list.

* Winners and joint winners

Winners and finalists
Year	Artist(s)	Ref.
1955	Frank Kelly Freas*	
1956	Frank Kelly Freas*	
1956	Chesley Bonestell	
1956	Ed Emshwiller	
1956	Virgil Finlay	
1956	Mel Hunter	
1956	Ed Valigursky	
1958	Frank Kelly Freas*	
1959	Frank Kelly Freas*	
1959	Ed Emshwiller	
1959	Virgil Finlay	
1959	H. R. Van Dongen	
1959	Wally Wood	
1960	Ed Emshwiller*	
1960	Virgil Finlay	
1960	Frank Kelly Freas	
1960	Mel Hunter	
1960	Wally Wood	
1961	Ed Emshwiller*	
1961	Virgil Finlay	
1961	Frank Kelly Freas	
1961	Mel Hunter	
1962	Ed Emshwiller*	
1962	Virgil Finlay	
1962	Mel Hunter	
1962	John Schoenherr	
1962	Alex Schomburg	
1963	Roy Krenkel*	
1963	Ed Emshwiller	
1963	Virgil Finlay	
1963	Jack Gaughan	
1963	John Schoenherr	
1964	Ed Emshwiller*	
1964	Virgil Finlay	
1964	Frank Frazetta	
1964	Roy Krenkel	
1964	John Schoenherr	
1965	John Schoenherr*	
1965	Ed Emshwiller	
1965	Frank Frazetta	
1965	Jack Gaughan	
1966	Frank Frazetta*	
1966	Frank Kelly Freas	
1966	Jack Gaughan	
1966	Gray Morrow	
1966	John Schoenherr	
1967	Jack Gaughan*	
1967	Frank Kelly Freas	
1967	Gray Morrow	
1967	John Schoenherr	
1968	Jack Gaughan*	
1968	Chesley Bonestell	
1968	Frank Frazetta	
1968	Frank Kelly Freas	
1968	Gray Morrow	
1968	John Schoenherr	
1969	Jack Gaughan*	
1969	Vaughn Bodé	
1969	Leo Dillon and Diane Dillon	
1969	Frank Kelly Freas	
1970	Frank Kelly Freas*	
1970	Leo Dillon and Diane Dillon	
1970	Jack Gaughan	
1970	Eddie Jones	
1970	Jeff Jones	
1971	Leo Dillon and Diane Dillon*	
1971	Frank Kelly Freas	
1971	Jack Gaughan	
1971	Eddie Jones	
1971	Jeff Jones	
1972	Frank Kelly Freas*	
1972	Vincent Di Fate	
1972	Jack Gaughan	
1972	Jeff Jones	
1972	John Schoenherr	
1973	Frank Kelly Freas*	
1973	Vincent Di Fate	
1973	Jack Gaughan	
1973	Mike Hinge	
1973	John Schoenherr	
1974	Frank Kelly Freas*	
1974	Vincent Di Fate	
1974	Frank Frazetta	
1974	Jack Gaughan	
1974	John Schoenherr	
1975	Frank Kelly Freas*	
1975	Stephen Fabian	
1975	Tim Kirk	
1975	John Schoenherr	
1975	Rick Sternbach	
1976	Frank Kelly Freas*	
1976	George Barr	
1976	Vincent Di Fate	
1976	Stephen Fabian	
1976	Rick Sternbach	
1977	Rick Sternbach*	
1977	George Barr	
1977	Vincent Di Fate	
1977	Stephen Fabian	
1978	Rick Sternbach*	
1978	Vincent Di Fate	
1978	Stephen Fabian	
1978	Frank Kelly Freas	
1978	Michael Whelan	
1979	Vincent Di Fate*	
1979	Stephen Fabian	
1979	David A. Hardy	
1979	Boris Vallejo	
1979	Michael Whelan	
1980	Michael Whelan*	
1980	Vincent Di Fate	
1980	Stephen Fabian	
1980	Paul Lehr	
1980	Boris Vallejo	
1981	Michael Whelan*	
1981	Vincent Di Fate	
1981	Stephen Fabian	
1981	Paul Lehr	
1981	Don Maitz	
1982	Michael Whelan*	
1982	Vincent Di Fate	
1982	Carl Lundgren	
1982	Don Maitz	
1982	Rowena Morrill	
1983	Michael Whelan*	
1983	Frank Kelly Freas	
1983	Don Maitz	
1983	Rowena Morrill	
1983	Barclay Shaw	
1983	Darrell K. Sweet	
1984	Michael Whelan*	
1984	Val Lakey Lindahn	
1984	Don Maitz	
1984	Rowena Morrill	
1984	Barclay Shaw	
1985	Michael Whelan*	
1985	Vincent Di Fate	
1985	Tom Kidd	
1985	Val Lakey Lindahn	
1985	Barclay Shaw	
1986	Michael Whelan*	
1986	Frank Kelly Freas	
1986	Don Maitz	
1986	Rowena Morrill	
1986	Barclay Shaw	
1987	Jim Burns*	
1987	Frank Kelly Freas	
1987	Tom Kidd	
1987	Don Maitz	
1987	J. K. Potter	
1987	Barclay Shaw	
1988	Michael Whelan*	
1988	David A. Cherry	
1988	Bob Eggleton	
1988	Tom Kidd	
1988	Don Maitz	
1988	J. K. Potter	
1989	Michael Whelan*	
1989	Thomas Canty	
1989	David A. Cherry	
1989	Bob Eggleton	
1989	Don Maitz	
1989	Todd Cameron Hamilton	
1990	Don Maitz*	
1990	Jim Burns	
1990	Thomas Canty	
1990	David A. Cherry	
1990	James Gurney	
1990	Tom Kidd	
1990	Michael Whelan	
1991	Michael Whelan*	
1991	Thomas Canty	
1991	David A. Cherry	
1991	Bob Eggleton	
1991	Don Maitz	
1992	Michael Whelan*	
1992	Thomas Canty	
1992	David A. Cherry	
1992	Bob Eggleton	
1992	Don Maitz	
1993	Don Maitz*	
1993	Thomas Canty	
1993	David A. Cherry	
1993	Bob Eggleton	
1993	James Gurney	
1994	Bob Eggleton*	
1994	Thomas Canty	
1994	David A. Cherry	
1994	Don Maitz	
1994	Michael Whelan	
1995	Jim Burns*	
1995	Thomas Canty	
1995	Bob Eggleton	
1995	Don Maitz	
1995	Michael Whelan	
1996	Bob Eggleton*	
1996	Jim Burns	
1996	Thomas Canty	
1996	Don Maitz	
1996	Michael Whelan	
1997	Bob Eggleton*	
1997	Thomas Canty	
1997	David A. Cherry	
1997	Don Maitz	
1997	Michael Whelan	
1998	Bob Eggleton*	
1998	Jim Burns	
1998	Thomas Canty	
1998	David A. Cherry	
1998	Don Maitz	
1998	Michael Whelan	
1999	Bob Eggleton*	
1999	Jim Burns	
1999	Donato Giancola	
1999	Don Maitz	
1999	Nick Stathopoulos	
1999	Michael Whelan	
2000	Michael Whelan*	
2000	Jim Burns	
2000	Bob Eggleton	
2000	Donato Giancola	
2000	Don Maitz	
2001	Bob Eggleton*	
2001	Jim Burns	
2001	Frank Kelly Freas	
2001	Donato Giancola	
2001	Michael Whelan	
2002	Michael Whelan*	
2002	Jim Burns	
2002	Bob Eggleton	
2002	Frank Kelly Freas	
2002	Donato Giancola	
2003	Bob Eggleton*	
2003	Jim Burns	
2003	David A. Cherry	
2003	Frank Kelly Freas	
2003	Donato Giancola	
2004	Bob Eggleton*	
2004	Jim Burns	
2004	Frank Frazetta	
2004	Frank Kelly Freas	
2004	Donato Giancola	
2005	Jim Burns*	
2005	Bob Eggleton	
2005	Frank Kelly Freas	
2005	Donato Giancola	
2005	John Picacio	
2006	Donato Giancola*	
2006	Jim Burns	
2006	Bob Eggleton	
2006	Stephan Martinière	
2006	John Picacio	
2006	Michael Whelan	
2007	Donato Giancola*	
2007	Bob Eggleton	
2007	Stephan Martinière	
2007	John Jude Palencar	
2007	John Picacio	
2008	Stephan Martinière*	
2008	Phil Foglio	
2008	John Harris	
2008	John Picacio	
2008	Shaun Tan	
2009	Donato Giancola*	
2009	Daniel Dos Santos	
2009	Bob Eggleton	
2009	John Picacio	
2009	Shaun Tan	
2010	Shaun Tan*	
2010	Daniel Dos Santos	
2010	Bob Eggleton	
2010	Stephan Martinière	
2010	John Picacio	
2011	Shaun Tan*	
2011	Daniel Dos Santos	
2011	Bob Eggleton	
2011	Stephan Martinière	
2011	John Picacio	
2012	John Picacio*	
2012	Daniel Dos Santos	
2012	Bob Eggleton	
2012	Michael Komarck	
2012	Stephan Martinière	
2013	John Picacio*	
2013	Vincent Chong	
2013	Julie Dillon	
2013	Daniel Dos Santos	
2013	Christian McGrath	
2014	Julie Dillon*	
2014	Galen Dara	
2014	Daniel Dos Santos	
2014	John Harris	
2014	John Picacio	
2014	Fiona Staples	
2015	Julie Dillon*	
2015	Kirk DouPonce	
2015	Nick Greenwood	
2015	Alan Pollack	
2015	Carter Reid	
2016	Abigail Larson*	
2016	Lars Braad Andersen	
2016	Larry Elmore	
2016	Michal Karcz	
2016	Larry Rostant	
2017	Julie Dillon*	
2017	Galen Dara	
2017	Christian McGrath	
2017	Victo Ngai	
2017	John Picacio	
2017	Sana Takeda	
2018	Sana Takeda*	
2018	Galen Dara	
2018	Kathleen Jennings	
2018	Bastien Lecouffe-Deharme	
2018	Victo Ngai	
2018	John Picacio	
2019	Charles Vess*	
2019	Galen Dara	
2019	Jaime Jones	
2019	Victo Ngai	
2019	John Picacio	
2019	Yuko Shimizu	
2020	John Picacio*	
2020	Tommy Arnold	
2020	Rovina Cai	
2020	Galen Dara	
2020	Yuko Shimizu	
2020	Alyssa Winans	
2021	Rovina Cai*	
2021	Tommy Arnold	
2021	Galen Dara	
2021	Maurizio Manzieri	
2021	John Picacio	
2021	Alyssa Winans	
2022	Rovina Cai*	
2022	Tommy Arnold	
2022	Ashley Mackenzie	
2022	Maurizio Manzieri	
2022	Will Staehle	
2022	Alyssa Winans	
2023	Enzhe Zhao*	
2023	Sija Hong	
2023	Kuri Huang	
2023	Paul Lewin	
2023	Alyssa Winans	
2023	Jian Zhang	
2024	Rovina Cai*	
2024	Micaela Alcaino	
2024	Galen Dara	
2024	Daniel Dos Santos	
2024	Tristan Elwell	
2024	Alyssa Winans	
2025	Alyssa Winans*	
2025	Micaela Alcaino	
2025	Audrey Benjaminsen	
2025	Rovina Cai	
2025	Maurizio Manzieri	
2025	Tran Nguyen	
2026	John Picacio*	
2026	Lulu Chen	
2026	Kelly Chong	
2026	Dave Kellett	
2026	Tran Nguyen	
2026	Tom Roberts	

=== Retro Hugos ===
Between the 1996 Worldcon and 2025 Worldcon, the World Science Fiction Society had the concept of "Retro-Hugos", in which the Hugo award could be retroactively awarded for 50, 75, or 100 years prior. Retro-Hugos could only be awarded for years after 1939 (the year of the first Worldcon) in which no Hugos were originally awarded. (Note: Although no "Best Professional Artist" Hugo was awarded at the 1957 convention, Hugos were awarded in other categories, hence there was no "Retro Hugo" for 1957 awarded in 2007.) Retro Hugos were awarded eight times, for 1939, 1941, 1943–1946, 1951, and 1954.

Retro Hugo winners and finalists
Year	Year awarded	Artist	Ref(s)
1939	2014	Virgil Finlay*	
1939	2014	Margaret Brundage	
1939	2014	Frank R. Paul	
1939	2014	Alex Schomburg	
1939	2014	H. W. "Wesso" Wessolowski	
1941	2016	Virgil Finlay*	
1941	2016	Hannes Bok	
1941	2016	Margaret Brundage	
1941	2016	Edd Cartier	
1941	2016	Frank R. Paul	
1941	2016	Hubert Rogers	
1943	2018	Virgil Finlay*	
1943	2018	Hannes Bok	
1943	2018	Margaret Brundage	
1943	2018	Edd Cartier	
1943	2018	Harold W. McCauley	
1943	2018	Hubert Rogers	
1944	2019	Virgil Finlay*	
1944	2019	Hannes Bok	
1944	2019	Margaret Brundage	
1944	2019	Antoine de Saint-Exupéry	
1944	2019	J. Allen St. John	
1944	2019	William Timmins	
1945	2020	Margaret Brundage*	
1945	2020	Earle K. Bergey	
1945	2020	Boris Dolgov	
1945	2020	Matt Fox	
1945	2020	Paul Orban	
1945	2020	William Timmins	
1946	1996	Virgil Finlay*	
1946	1996	Earle K. Bergey	
1946	1996	Hannes Bok	
1946	1996	Edd Cartier	
1946	1996	Frank R. Paul	
1951	2001	Frank Kelly Freas*	
1951	2001	Hannes Bok	
1951	2001	Chesley Bonestell	
1951	2001	Edd Cartier	
1951	2001	Virgil Finlay	
1954	2004	Chesley Bonestell*	
1954	2004	Ed Emshwiller	
1954	2004	Virgil Finlay	
1954	2004	Frank Kelly Freas	
1954	2004	Richard M. Powers	
