= Michael Komarck =

- Known for: Fantasy art

Michael Komarck is a fantasy artist. His work has been featured in many roleplaying games, board games, book covers, and collectible cards. Komarck produced the official art and calendars for George R.R. Martin's A Song of Ice and Fire.

== Early life ==
Michael Komarck was born in Louisiana and moved to Michigan as a child.

== Career ==
Komarck has worked as an illustrator on the Star Wars Galaxies Trading Card Game by Sony Online Entertainment. He has done illustrations for Magic: The Gathering and Hearthstone. He has also illustrated comic books.

Komarck has also worked as an illustrator for Dungeons & Dragons on third edition books.

He also provided the cover art for Voltaire's album, Raised by Bats.

== Awards ==
Komarck was nominated for the Chesley Award for Best Cover Illustration – Paperback in 2009, for Dragonforge by James Maxey. Komarck was also nominated for the Hugo Award for Best Professional Artist in 2012.
