= Kathleen Jennings =

Kathleen Jennings may be:

- Kathy Jennings, born 1953, Delaware politician
- Kathleen Jennings (illustrator), born 1980, Australian writer and illustrator
