= Virgil Finlay: An Astrology Sketchbook =

1975 collection of drawings by Virgil Finlay

- Dust-jacket from the first edition
- Author: Virgil Finlay
- Illustrator: Virgil Finlay
- Cover artist: Virgil Finlay
- Language: English
- Subject: Virgil Finlay
- Publisher: Donald M. Grant, Publisher, Inc.
- Publication date: 1975
- Publication place: United States
- Media type: Print (Hardback)
- Pages: 148 pp
- OCLC: 2931848

Virgil Finlay: An Astrology Sketchbook is a collection of drawings by Virgil Finlay. It was published in 1975 by Donald M. Grant, Publisher, Inc. in an edition of 2,000 copies. The book contains astrological art by Finlay with introductions by Beverly C. Finlay and Robert Prestopino.
