= Daniel Dos Santos (artist) =

American speculative fiction artist (born 1978)

- Dos Santos from Dragon Con in 2026
- Born: 1978 (age 47–48); Connecticut
- Awards: Jack Gaughan Award, Chesley Award
- Website: dandossantos.com

Daniel Dos Santos (born 1978) is an American speculative fiction artist whose work has appeared on book covers by publishers Tor, Bantam, Pyr, and many more, as well as a variety of magazine and comic covers and interiors. He has been nominated for the Hugo Award seven times.

A love of comics led Dos Santos to an interest in art. During his final year of high school, he served an internship with Steven Stroud. Following graduation, he attended the School of Visual Arts in New York City, where he began to focus on speculative art. Dos Santos and Stroud founded a studio in Shelton, Connecticut, after he graduated.

Dos Santos, along with Irene Gallo, has hosted a series of live art demonstrations at the Society of Illustrators in Manhattan called "Art Out Loud". The series began as a collaborative painting demo, but changed over time to better reflect the way in which artists actually work.

Dos Santos was nominated for the Hugo Award for Best Professional Artist from 2009 through 2014, as well as 2024. Dos Santos received the Rhodes Family Award for special achievement in illustration in 2000, as well as the Starr Foundation Award for 2001. He received the 2007 Jack Gaughan Award for Best Emerging Artist and won the first Chesley Award for Best Cover Illustration – Paperback in the same year.
