= Lubov (painter) =

Russian painter

- Born: St. Petersburg, Russia
- Education: classical
- Known for: painting
- Movement: Science fiction, fantasy

Lubov (real name unknown) is the pseudonym of a painter (born in St. Petersburg) specializing in science fiction and fantasy art.

== General information ==
A Chesley Award nominee, Lubov's work has appeared internationally in numerous print publications and galleries, on multiple cards for the games Magic: The Gathering and Galactic Empires, and on the covers of various books, comics, event programs, and magazines. She is also a regular guest artist and speaker at numerous science-fiction and fantasy conventions, worldwide.

Her Dungeons & Dragons work includes On Hallowed Ground.

== Education ==
Lubov claims to have trained at the Saint Petersburg Academy of Arts in Russia, where her focus was on the classical application of oils. Seeking (she says) political and cultural freedom, she claims to have emigrated from Russia to the United States, where she says she studied at the School of the Art Institute of Chicago on a four-year scholarship.

== Science fiction and fantasy conventions ==
From 1993 to the present, Lubov's focus on the worlds of science fiction and fantasy led her to become a regular seminar speaker and/or guest artist at numerous conventions, including Westercon, Xanadu, Loscon, Demicon, LoneStarCon 2, LepreCon, Balticon, Artist Guest of Honor at Arisia '14, and others.
