= Virgil Finlay =

American pulp fantasy, science fiction and horror illustrator

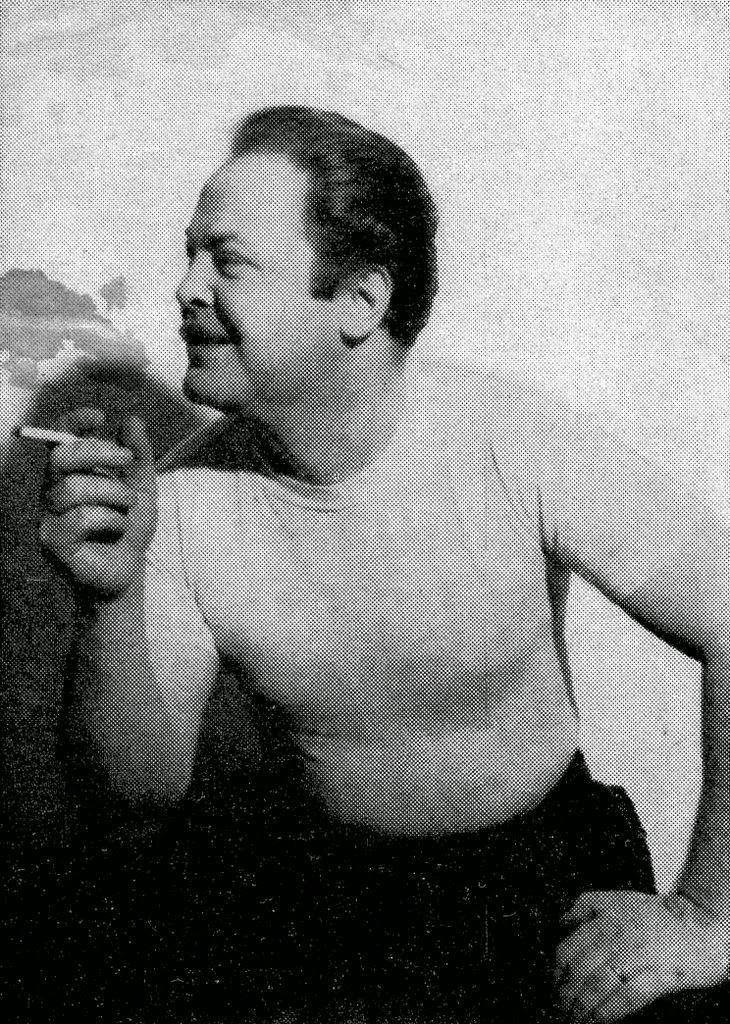
- Finlay in December 1952
- Born: July 23, 1914; Rochester, New York, United States
- Died: January 18, 1971 (aged 56); Westbury, New York, United States
- Known for: Illustration
- Awards: Hugo Award for Best Professional Artist, 1944 (Retro Hugo awarded in 2019), 1945 (Retro Hugo awarded in 1996); Hugo Award for Best Interior Illustrator, 1953; Science Fiction Hall of Fame, 2012

Virgil Finlay (July 23, 1914 – January 18, 1971) was an American pulp fantasy, science fiction and horror illustrator. He has been called "part of the pulp magazine history ... one of the foremost contributors of original and imaginative art work for the most memorable science fiction and fantasy publications of our time." While he worked in a range of media, from gouache to oils, Finlay specialized in, and became famous for, detailed pen-and-ink drawings accomplished with abundant stippling, cross-hatching, and scratchboard techniques. Despite the very labor-intensive and time-consuming nature of his specialty, Finlay created more than 2600 works of graphic art in his 35-year career.

The Science Fiction Hall of Fame inducted Finlay in 2012.

== Biography ==
Virgil Warden Finlay was born July 23, 1914, in Rochester, New York. His father, woodworker Warden Hugh Finlay, died at age 40 in the midst of the Great Depression, leaving his family (widow Ruby and two children) in straitened circumstances. By his high school years, Virgil Finlay was exercising his passions for art and poetry, and discovered his lifelong subject matter in the pulp magazines of the era—science fiction in Amazing Stories (1927), fantasy and horror in Weird Tales (1928)—and began to exhibit at the age of 16. By age 21 he was confident enough in his art to send six pieces, unsolicited, to editor Farnsworth Wright at Weird Tales, who determined that such detailed work would transfer successfully to relatively rough paper the magazine used (pulp magazines were so described because of their paper quality). Wright began buying Finlay's work, which debuted with illustrations of three different stories in the December 1935 issue and appeared in 62 issues including the last in September 1954. He also created 19 color covers for Weird Tales numbers from February 1937 to March 1953.

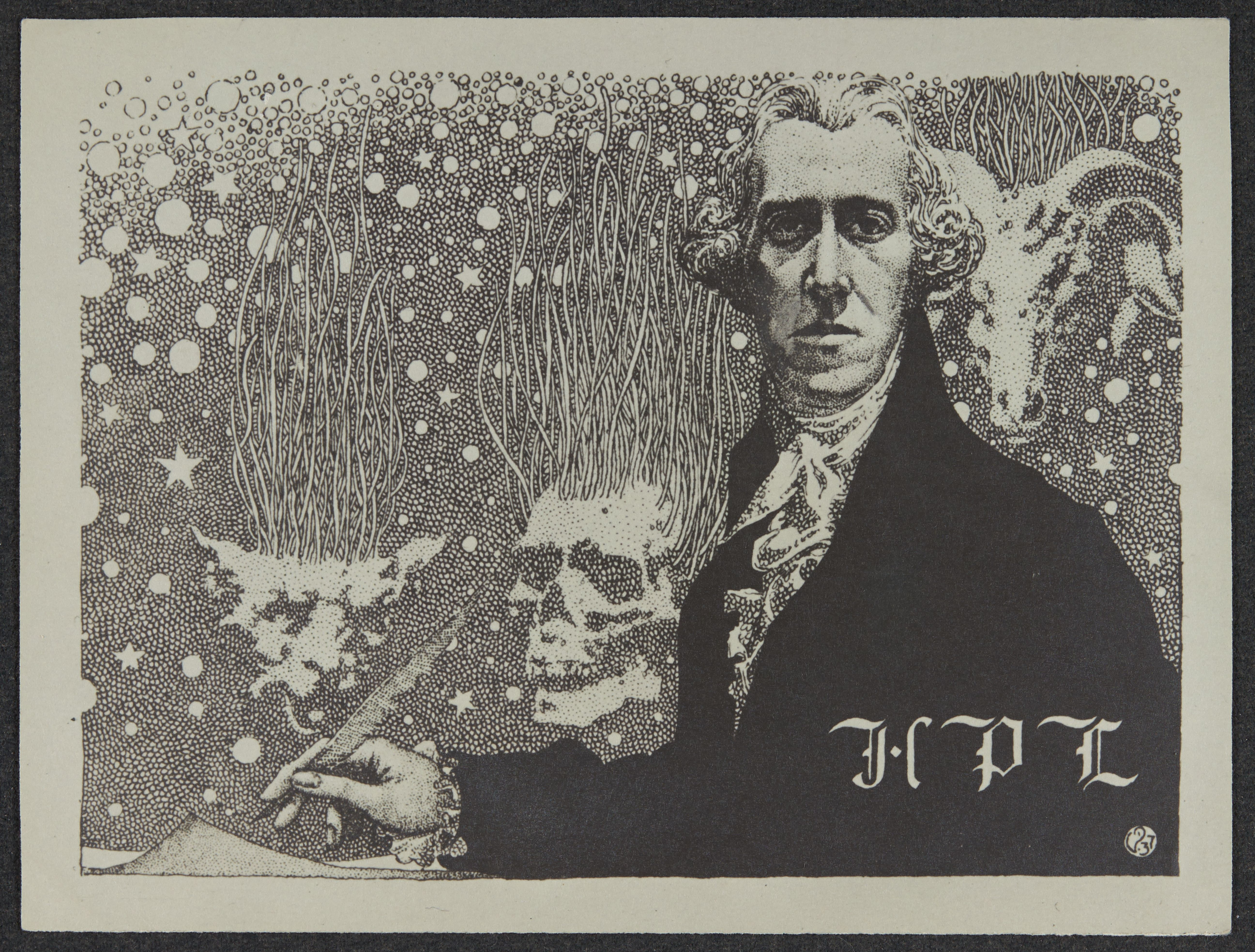
Finlay's illustration of H. P. Lovecraft as an eighteenth-century gentleman, 1937

Finlay quickly branched out to other publications after his 1935 debut; he was an immediate hit. In 1938 he went to work for A. Merritt at The American Weekly, moving from Rochester to New York City. Later the same year, he married Beverly Stiles, whom he had known in childhood in Rochester (November 16, 1938), and at some point, converted to Judaism. In 1937, he made an illustration for the first installment of H. P. Lovecraft's Supernatural Horror in Literature, which was to be published in the Science-Fantasy Correspondent. When that magazine was ceased publication, it was used on the cover of the April–May 1937 issue of the Amateur Correspondent. This portrayal has become one of the more prominent artistic depictions of Lovecraft.

Finlay served in the US Army during World War II, and saw extensive combat in the Pacific theater, notably on Okinawa, and did posters and illustrations for the Morale Services during his three years of military service. He resumed his artistic career after demobilization, doing a considerable amount of work for science fiction magazines and books. As the pulp magazine market narrowed through the 1950s, Finlay turned to astrology magazines as a new venue for his art. In 1953 he won one of the inaugural Hugo Awards, as the previous year's best "Interior Illustrator"; cover artists and interior illustrators were not thereafter distinguished by the Hugo Award for Best Artist under various names. He was also named the best artist of 1945 in the 50-year Retro Hugos of 1996.

Finlay also wrote poetry throughout his adult life. Virtually none was published in his lifetime, though significant samples have been printed posthumously.

Finlay had to undergo major surgery for cancer in early 1969. He recovered enough to go back to work for a time, but the cancer returned, and Finlay died on January 18, 1971, aged 56. (In the last year of his life, he suffered from liver failure. The cause of death was officially cirrhosis, but an autopsy revealed that he had advanced lung cancer.) Finlay just missed a resurgence in interest in his artwork from the early 1970s onward. Both Donald M. Grant and Gerry de la Ree have published collections of Finlay's work since the artist's death. The later books published by Underwood-Miller contain illustrations from the Gerry de la Ree editions, as well as additional material. A slightly later generation of fantasy fans were introduced to Finlay's art by reprints of his earlier work in the horror film fan magazine Castle of Frankenstein alongside the fine writing that gave significance to that magazine.

Roads, a fantasy novella by Seabury Quinn, first published in the January 1938 Weird Tales, and featuring a cover and interior illustrations by Finlay, was published in a very limited edition by Arkham House in 1948. It was recently given a 21st-century facsimile reprinting by Red Jacket Press.

== Collections ==
- Virgil Finlay (Donald M. Grant, 1971)
- An Astrology Sketch Book (Donald M. Grant, 1975) introductions by Beverly C. Finlay and Robert Prestopino
- Finlay's Femmes (1976) – portfolio of drawings
- Finlay's Illustrations for Weird Tales (Showcase Art Productions, 1976) – portfolio of drawings
- Women of the Ages (Underwood-Miller, 1992)
- Strange Science (Underwood-Miller, 1993)
- Phantasms (Underwood-Miller, 1993)
- Virgil Finlay's Far Beyond (Charles F. Miller, 1994)

=== Books published by Gerry de la Ree ===
- Finlay's Lost Drawings: For Shakespeare's Midsummer Night's Dream (1975) with Gerry de la Ree
- The Book of Virgil Finlay (1976)
- Second Book of Virgil Finlay (1978)
- The Third Book of Virgil Finlay (1979)
- The Fourth Book of Virgil Finlay (1979)
- The Fifth Book of Virgil Finlay (1979)
- The Sixth Book of Virgil Finlay: The Astrology Years (1980)
- The Seventh Book of Virgil Finlay – Virgil Finlay Remembered (1981)
