= Dante Luiz =

Brazilian artist, translator, and writer

- Born: Brazil
- Occupations: Artist, writer, translator
- Writing career
- Language: English, Portuguese
- Notable awards: 2023 Ignyte Award for Outstanding Creative Nonfiction

Dante Luiz is a Brazilian artist, writer, and translator. He has received an Ignyte Award and has been a finalist for the Hugo Award.

== Early life and education ==
In a 2020 interview with Strange Horizons, Luiz stated that he was born on an island in Southern Brazil. He was inspired by his grandfather, a prolific reader and inventor. His father worked as a bookseller for a short time, giving Luiz the opportunity to read books by classic science fiction authors. Luiz noted that he was particularly inspired by The Songs of Distant Earth by Arthur C. Clarke, which he re-read often.

== Career ==
In a review for the 2020 graphic novel CREMA, Christopher Lytal of Library Journal praised Luiz's "expressive, understated art" and called it "by turns gorgeous and grotesque." Publishers Weekly praised the teamwork between Christmas and Luiz, concluding that the graphic novel is "as satisfying as a just-made café con leche."

In a 2021 review for Locus, Karen Burnham reviewed the short story "My Mother's Hand." The story recounts the tale of a trans man who is possessed by the ghost of his abusive mother. The mother is disappointed that her son gave up his feminine magic to become a sailor. Burnham concluded that the protagonist "springs to life on the page, taking a largely epistolic historical tale and imbuing it with animation and humor." The story was later included on the 2021 Locus Recommended Reading List.

In 2022, Luiz was awarded an Otherwise Fellowship, in part for his story "My Mother's Hand."

In a 2025 interview with Nightmare Magazine, Luiz discussed his love of telenovelas and his fascination with lost media. He also discussed the way in which the 2021 Cinemateca Brasileira fire and the Final Destination franchise inspired his 2025 short story "The Short History of a Long-Forgotten, Ill-Fated Telenovela."

As of 2026, Luiz is the Art Director for Strange Horizons.

=== As artist ===
Comics

- — (1 January 2016). "Prenda Minha". In Zora Gilbert; Cat Parra (eds.). Dates! An Anthology of Queer Historical Fiction Stories. Margins Publishing. ISBN 9780692574867.
- — (1 June 2017). "Diabolesco". In Iris Jay; Hye M. (eds.). Tabula Idem Anthology. 360 Digital Books. ISBN 9780998451213.
- — (28 July 2017). "Figurinha". In Zora Gilbert; Cat Parra (eds.). Dates! Volume II. Margins Publishing. ISBN 9780997664300.
- — (1 January 2018). "Eyes". In Sarah Benkin (ed.). Built on Strange Ground. Peppermin Monster Press. ASIN B0DM2345B8.
- — (1 March 2018). "The Alligator at the End of the World". Wayward Sisters: An Anthology of Monstrous Women. TO Comix Press. ISBN 9780994937452.
- — (24 April 2018). "Fazenda do Sangue Azul". In Hope Nicholson; S. M. Beiko (eds.). Gothic Tales of Haunted Love. Bedside Press. ISBN 9781988715070.
- — (1 December 2018). "It Began in My Arms". Corpus: A Comic Anthology of Bodily Ailments. ISBN 9780692161012.
- — (1 May 2019). "Girls Who Die In The River". In Andrew Wheeler (ed.). Shout Out!. TO Comix Press. ISBN 9780994937476.
- — (1 July 2020). "Three Blessings". In Bones McKay (ed.). Moonlight: A Queer Werewolf Anthology. McKay and Gray Publications. ISBN 9781777141202.
- — (1 August 2020). "Sap & Seed". In Allison O'Toole (ed.). Wayward Kindred. TO Comix Press. ISBN 9780994937483.
- — (1 January 2021). "Arau". In Tab Kimpton; Jade Sarson (eds.). Ambrosia: Trans Masc & Non Binary Erotic Comics Anthology. Discord Comics. ISBN 9781916224315.
- — (1 October 2021). "Children of the Sea". In Joamette Gil (ed.). Mañana: Latinx Comics From the 25th Century. Power and Magic Press. ISBN 9780998490441.
- — (Spring 2024). "PARTS" (PDF). Hexagon Magazine. No. 16.

Graphic novels

- Johnnie Christmas (w), Dante Luiz (a), Dante Luiz (col), Ryan Ferrier (let), Atla Hrafney (ed), Johnnie Christmas (cover). CREMA (2020). ComiXology / Dark Horse Comics.

=== As writer ===
Fiction

- "Ingredient No. 5". Undercities: An Anthology. Dirty Birds Press. 1 June 2017. ISBN 9780692865934.
- "My Mother's Hand". Constelación Magazine. January 2020.
- "Os Princípios da Confiança". As Artes Mágicas do Ignoto. July 2021.
- Dante Luiz (2 November 2021). "Colonia del Sacramento's Little Tailoring Shop". In Eric J. Guignard (ed.). Professor Charlatan Bardot's Travel Anthology to the Most (Fictional) Haunted Buildings in the Weird, Wild World. Dark Moon Books. ISBN 9781949491487.
- "Escobar Medina Plays God". Interzone. No. 297. January 2024.
- "The Short History of a Long-Forgotten, Ill-Fated Telenovela". Nightmare Magazine. No. 159. December 2025.

Non-fiction

- "If You Can #cometobrazil". Future Science Fiction Digest. No. 13. 22 December 2021.
- "The H Word: Horror in a Country that Is Not Afraid of Death". Nightmare Magazine. No. 112. January 2022.
- "Bunnies". Nightmare Magazine. No. 118. July 2022.

== Awards and honors ==
Year	Award	Category	Work	Result	Ref.
2018	Prism Awards	Short Form Comic	Figurinha	Finalist	
2019	Prism Awards	Short Form Comic	Fazenda De Sangue Azul	Finalist	
2023	Ignyte Award	Creative Nonfiction	"The H Word: Horror in a Country that Is Not Afraid of Death"	Won	
2024	Hugo Award	Fan Artist	—N/a	Finalist	
2024	Ignyte Award	Artist	—N/a	Nominated	
