= Kathleen Jennings (illustrator) =

Australian illustrator and writer

Kathleen Dolan Jennings
- Jennings at World Fantasy Convention 2026
- Born: 26 May 1980 (age 46); Brisbane, Australia
- Education: University of Queensland (BA, MPhil, PhD)
- Occupations: Artist and writer
- Writing career
- Notable awards: World Fantasy Award for Best Artist (2020); Sydney J. Bounds Award (2021)
- Website: kathleenjennings.com tanaudel.wordpress.com

Kathleen Dolan Jennings (born 1980) is an Australian gothic and fantasy illustrator and author known for her silhouette illustrations and fantastical maps. Jennings is a self-taught artist. As an artist, she won the Ditmar Award for Best Fan Artist annually from 2012 to 2016. She also won the 2020 World Fantasy Award for Best Artist, as well as the 2021 Sydney J. Bounds Award.

== Early life and education ==
Jennings was born in Brisbane in 26 May 1980. She has at least one sibling, a sister. Jennings grew up on a cattle station in Western Queensland. Due to the station's remote location, Jennings completed much of her education through distance learning before attending a boarding school in Toowoomba for two years.

She later studied at the University of Queensland, from which she received a Bachelor of Arts and Master of Philosophy in English literature, as well as a Doctor of Philosophy in creative writing. Jennings's dissertation work was later adapted into her 2025 novel, Honeyeater. As of 2026, she is in the Postgraduate Research Creative Writing Program at the University of Queensland.

== Career ==
Jennings started her career as a lawyer, working in private practice and for the government for five years each. She then transferred to focusing on writing and illustration.

Jennings began her career in literature through book illustrations and cover art. She has worked with several notable authors, including Catherynne M. Valente (To Spin a Darker Stair, 2012; The Bread We Eat in Dreams, 2013), Angela Slatter (The Bitterwood Bible and Other Recountings, 2014; The Tallow-Wife, 2021), Jane Yolen (Finding Baby Yaga, 2018), Margo Lanagan (Stray Bats, 2019), Cassandra Clare (Chain of Iron, 2021), and Holly Black (The Prisoner's Throne, 2024). Her work as a cover artist and illustrator has gained her multiple award wins and nominations. Every year from 2012 to 2016, she won the Ditmar Award for Best Fan Artist. In 2020, she won the World Fantasy Award for Best Artist.

Jennings's written works include chapbooks, novellas, short stories, a short story collection, and a novel. Jennings published the novella Flyaway with Pan Macmillan in 2020. The work was well received by critics, with reviews published in BookPage, Literary Hub, Locus, and Reactor, among other venues. The novella won the 2021 Ditmar Award for Best Novella or Novelette, and was a finalist for the 2020 Australasian Shadows Award for Novel, as well as the 2021 Crawford Award and World Fantasy Award for Best Novella. Jennings published her debut short story collection, Kindling, with Small Beer Press in 2024. The collection includes short stories previously published in other venues. Kindling was a finalist for several awards for best collection, including an Aurealis Award, Ditmar Award, Locus Award, and World Fantasy Award. In 2025, Jennings published her first full-length novel, Honeyeater, with Pan Macmillan. The novel was a finalist for the 2025 Aurealis Award for Best Fantasy Novel.

== Awards and honours ==
=== Artist ===
Awards for Jennings' collective work
Year	Award	Result	Ref.
2010	Ditmar Award for Best Fan Artist	Finalist	
2010	Ditmar Award for Best New Talent	Finalist	
2011	Ditmar Award for Best New Talent	Finalist	
2012	Ditmar Award for Best Fan Artist	Won	
2012	World Fantasy Award for Best Artist	Finalist	
2013	Ditmar Award for Best Fan Artist	Won	
2013	World Fantasy Award for Best Artist	Finalist	
2014	Ditmar Award for Best Fan Artist	Won	
2015	Ditmar Award for Best Fan Artist	Won	
2016	Ditmar Award for Best Fan Artist	Won	
2016	World Fantasy Award for Best Artist	Finalist	
2017	Ditmar Award for Best Fan Artist	Nominated	
2018	Hugo Award for Best Professional Artist	Finalist	
2020	Locus Award for Best Artist	Finalist	
2020	World Fantasy Award for Best Artist	Won	
2021	Locus Award for Best Artist	Finalist	
2021	Sydney J. Bounds Award	Won	
2026	Locus Award for Best Artist	Finalist	
2026	World Fantasy Award for Best Artist	in progress	

=== Works ===
Jennings's work has also received praise. Locus has regularly included Jennings's publications on their year-end list of the recommended reading, including "Skull and Hyssop" (2014), for the year's best novellettes, "The Heart of Owl Abbas" (2018) for the year's best short stories, Flyaway (2020) for the year's best novellas, "Merry in Time" (2022) for the year's best novelettes, Kindling (2024) for the year's best collections, and Honeyeater (2025) for the year's best novels. Reactor reviewer Molly Templeton also included Honeyeater on her list of the best publications of 2025.

Awards for Jennings's individual works
Year	Work	Sponsor/Ceremony	Category	Result	Ref.
2012	"Finishing School"	Aurealis Award	Best Young Adult Short Story	Finalist	
2012	"Finishing School"	Ditmar Award	Best Artwork	Won	
2012	The Freedom Maze (cover art)	Ditmar Award	Best Artwork	Finalist	
2013	Midnight and Moonshine (cover art)	Ditmar Award	Best Artwork	Won	
2013	To Spin a Darker Stair (cover art and illustrations)	Ditmar Award	Best Artwork	Finalist	
2014	Eclipse Online (illustrations)	Ditmar Award	Best Artwork	Finalist	
2014	"A Small Wild Magic"	Aurealis Award	Best Graphic Novel / Illustrated Work	Finalist	
2015	Black-Winged Angels (illustrations)	Ditmar Award	Best Artwork	Won	
2015	The Bitterwood Bible and Other Recountings (illustrations)	Ditmar Award	Best Artwork	Finalist	
2015	Phantazein (cover art)	Ditmar Award	Best Artwork	Finalist	
2016	Cranky Ladies of History (cover and internal artwork)	Ditmar Award	Best Artwork	Won	
2016	Bloodlines (cover art)	Ditmar Award	Best Artwork	Finalist	
2016	"A Hedge of Yellow Roses"	Ditmar Award	Best Short Story	Won	
2019	"The Heart of Owl Abbas"	Ditmar Award	Best Short Story	Won	
2019	"The Heart of Owl Abbas"	Eugie Award		Finalist	
2020	Flyaway	Australasian Shadows Awards	Novel	Finalist	
2021	Flyaway	Crawford Award		Finalist	
2021	Flyaway	Ditmar Award	Best Novella or Novelette	Won	
2021	Flyaway	World Fantasy Award	Novella	Finalist	
2022	"Merry in Time"	Aurealis Award	Best Fantasy Novella	Finalist	
2023	"Science fiction for hire? Notes towards an emerging practice of creative futurism"	Aurealis Award	Convenors' Award for Excellence	Won	
2024	Kindling	Aurealis Award	Best Collection	Finalist	
2025	Honeyeater	Aurealis Award	Best Fantasy Novel	Finalist	
2025	Kindling	Ditmar Award	Best Collected Work	Finalist	
2025	Kindling	Locus Award	Best Collection	Finalist	
2025	Kindling	World Fantasy Award	Collection	Finalist	
2026	Honeyeater	Ditmar Award	Best Novel	Won	
2026	Honeyeater	Ditmar Award	Best Professional Artwork	Won	
2026	Honeyeater	Queensland Literary Awards	Lord Mayor's People's Choice Queensland Book of the Year Award	Finalist	

== Publications ==
=== As author ===
- Travelogues: Vignettes from Trains in Motion. Brain Jar Press. 2020. ISBN 978-1922479006.
- Flyaway. Pan Macmillan. 2020. ISBN 9781250260499.
- Kindling: Stories. Small Beer Press. 2024. ISBN 9781618732132.
- Honeyeater. Pan Macmillan. 2025. ISBN 978-1250845887.

=== As illustrator ===
- Mudge, Faith; Valente, Catherynne M. (2012). To Spin a Darker Stair. FableCroft Publishing. ISBN 9780980777062.
- Valente, Catherynne M. (2013). The Bread We Eat in Dreams. Subterranean. ISBN 9781596065826.
- Slatter, Angela (2014). The Bitterwood Bible and Other Recountings. Tartarus. ISBN 9781905784653.
- Yolen, Jane (2018). Finding Baby Yaga. Tor. ISBN 9781250163875.
- Lanagan, Margo (2019). Stray Bats. Small Beer. ISBN 9781618731753.
- Clare, Cassandra (2021). Chain of Iron. McElderry. ISBN 9781481431903.
- Slatter, Angela (2021). The Tallow-Wife. Tartarus. ISBN 9781912586240.
- Black, Holly (2024). The Prisoner's Throne. Little, Brown & Co. ISBN 9780316592710.
