= Virgil Finlay (book) =

1971 art book

- Dust-jacket from the first edition
- Author: compiled and edited by Donald M. Grant
- Illustrator: Virgil Finlay
- Cover artist: Virgil Finlay
- Language: English
- Subject: Virgil Finlay
- Publisher: Donald M. Grant, Publisher, Inc.
- Publication date: 1971
- Publication place: United States
- Media type: Print (Hardback)
- Pages: 153 pp
- OCLC: 211496

Virgil Finlay is a memorial collection of drawings by and appreciations of Virgil Finlay. It was compiled and edited by Donald M. Grant and published in 1971 by Donald M. Grant, Publisher, Inc. in an edition of 1,202 copies.

== Contents ==
- Introduction, by Donald M. Grant
- Selected Illustrations, by Virgil Finlay
- "Virgil Finlay", by Sam Moskowitz
- "A Virgil Finlay Checklist", by Gerry de la Ree
- An Index to "A Virgil Finlay Checklist"
