= Bruce Jensen =

American illustrator

Bruce Jensen (born 1962 in Indianapolis, Indiana) is a US illustrator who has created book covers for science fiction authors such as Kim Stanley Robinson, Neal Stephenson, Charles Sheffield, Joe Haldeman, Linda Nagata, Kelley Eskridge, and Philip K. Dick. His covers were described by Nagata as "deftly illustrat[ing] the mood, the feeling of the book". He also drew the unfinished Neuromancer graphic novel in 1989. He won the 1995 Jack Gaughan Award for Best Emerging Artist.

== Career overview ==
Bruce Jensen began drawing at an early age, drawing the typical childhood birds and dinosaurs. As he grew older he discovered science fiction. A book that heavily influenced his decision to become a science fiction cover artist was Jack Gaughn's cover to The Skylark of Valeron by E. E. Smith. When Bruce was in high school he realized his dream to become an artist. He then went on to the Columbus College of Art and Design, receiving BFA in 1984; it is here that he developed his more abstract usage of color.

In the summer of 1984 Jensen received his first cover assignment, which went well enough for him to receive others immediately after this. During the next six years after his first book cover he had produced twelve book covers; he also spent some time working in television. In 1990 Jensen was earning enough money from painting science fiction book covers that he considered it to be his full-time job.
