= The Twilight Reign =

Five Book Series By Tom Lloyd

The Twilight Reign is a five-book series written by Tom Lloyd. The five books in order are: The Stormcaller, The Twilight Herald, The Grave Thief, The Ragged Man, and The Dusk Watchman It follows the fight against the shadow Azaer.

== The Land ==
The Land is the setting of The Twilight Reign. It is ruled by seven different tribes: The Farlan, The Menin, The Chetse, The Litse, The Yeetatchen, The Vukotics and The Fysthrall. Many diverse creatures roam its lands and it hosts many different environments.

=== Creatures ===
The Land is a home to a multitude of species. Whether remnant of the Great War or a subject of the Gods they all play an important part in The Land's history and future.

==== Humans ====
The majority of The Land's inhabitants are humans. The seven Tribes are made up of humans and most humans worship the Gods. Humans reside all over the Land and have founded many cities.

==== Elves ====
Little is known about the elves beside the fact that they reside in The Waste and were cursed by the gods for waging war against them. They have no king and are loyal to their House and the elven race. It is presumed that they dislike humans and that they do not worship the Gods. The last king of the elves was Aryn Bwr whose name was cursed and removed from history by the gods who were not content with his death. The elves due to the curse are now twisted shadows of themselves.

==== Vampires ====
Cursed by the Gods for siding with Aryn Bwr last king of the elves, the Vukotic siblings were cursed with vampirism and doomed to roam The Land consuming the life force of mortals to sustain themselves. They can pass on their curse through a bite, but they cannot remove it from themselves. The Vukotic siblings are the only vampires who cannot be killed by any means.

==== War Creatures ====
The Gods created many species to fight for them in the Great War. However, their abilities soon became surplus and the Gods abandoned, having no need for their talents. Instead of dying out, the creatures adapted and survived to reproduce and grow in number. There are still many of these creatures. Some of them are the trolls, the centaurs, the sibilis and the Estashanti warriors.

=== The Waste ===
A swath of land lying in the East, The Waste was ravaged by the Gods following The Great War. The vast amount of energies poured into the Earth by both the Gods and the Elves ruined the land and made it a place of strange creatures and desolation.

== The Tribes ==
=== The Farlan ===
The most powerful of the tribes, the Farlan control a large nation in the North. They are led by the story's protagonist, Isak, following Lord Bahl's death, their former leader, at the hands of Kastan Styrax. The Farlan are tall with dark hair and dark eyes, they are considered to be arrogant and have tendencies to show off. The Farlan armies rely heavily on cavalry and pride themselves on their cavalry. The patron God of the Farlan is Nartis.

=== The Menin ===
A strong tribe from The Waste, they are led by Kastan Styrax, a main antagonist in the story. Styrax has dreams of building an empire, and will go very far to reach them. He led his army and conquered the Chetse tribe, the first to fall to him. The patron God of The Menin is Karkarn.

=== The Chetse ===
The Chetse are a desert tribe whose territory borders The Waste. They were conquered when a daemon summoned by Kastan Styrax possessed their Krann and drove off their Lord. Their soldiers are extremely obedient and fight in a phalanx. The Chetse are small but broad and are considered to be overly obedient and have a tendency to drink too much. The patron God of the Chetse is Tsatach.

=== The Litse ===
The Litse were almost wiped out by a Menin warlord and as a result are a broken tribe. The Litse white-eyes are different from normal white-eyes in the fact that they have wings and are weaker than normal white-eyes. The last Litse city is the circle city which lies south of the Farlan state. The Litse have blonde hair yellow eyes and are considered arrogant and overly ambitious by the other tribes. Their patron god is Ilit.

=== The Yeetatchen ===
The Tribe of Lord Isak's intended bride. The Yeetatchen's patron God is Amavoq.

=== Narkang ===
Not under control of any tribe, Narkang is a country of migrants and half-breeds who would have been scorned elsewhere. The country was founded by King Emin and is an ally of the Farlan.

=== The Harlequins ===
The Harlequins are the keepers of the Land's history. From a young age they are trained with the blade and to tell epic tales and stories to the Land's citizens. When they come of age, Harlequins are given a mask to cover their face and travel the Land telling stories to all who wish to hear. They have no history or stories of their own except one of a master of the blade who would become their king.

=== Azaer ===
A shadow who is neither god nor mortal. He is the main enemy and runs schemes and plots that run over millennia and stretch all the way to the heavens.

== The Gods ==
- Alterr-Goddess of the Night Sky and the Greater Moon. Member of the Upper Circle of the Pantheon.
- Amavoq-Goddess of the Forest, patron of the Yeetatchen. Member of the Upper Circle of the Pantheon.
- Belarannar-God of the Earth. Member of the Upper Circle of the Pantheon.
- Cerdin-God of Thieves
- Death-Chief of the Gods and the Husband of Life. Head of the Upper Circle of the Pantheon.
- Fate-Goddess of Luck and Chance.
- Ilit-God of the Wind, patron of the Litse. Member of the Upper Circle of the Pantheon.
- Inoth-Goddess of the Western Sea's, daughter of Lliot.
- Karkarn-God of War, patron of the Menin. Member of the Upper Circle of the Pantheon.
- Kitar-Goddess of Harvest and Fertility. Member of the Upper Circle of the Pantheon.
- Kassalain-Goddess of Murder.
- Larat-God of Magic and Manipulation. Member of the Upper Circle of the Pantheon.
- Leitah-Goddess of Wisdom and Learning. Killed during the Great War.
- Life-Queen of the Gods and the Wife of Death. Killed during the Great War. Former member of the Upper Circle of the Pantheon.
- Lliot-God of All Waters. Killed during the Great War. His domain was divided among his five children: Inoth, Turist, Shoso, Vasle and Asenn.
- Nartis-God of Night, Storms, and Hunters, patron of the Farlan. Member of the Upper Circle of the Pantheon.
- Nyphal-Goddess of Travelers.
- Shotir-God of Healing and Forgiveness
- Triena-Goddess of Romantic Love and Fidelity.
- Tsatach-God of Fire and the Sun, patron of the Chetse. Member of the Upper Circle of the Pantheon.
- Vasle-God of Rivers and Inland Seas.
- Vellern-God of Birds.
- Veren-first God of Beasts. Killed during the Great War.
- Vrest-God of Beasts. Succeeded Veren. Member of the Upper Circle of the Pantheon.
