= Roberta Rogow =

American writer of speculative fiction

- Born: March 7, 1942 (age 84)
- Education: Queens College, City University of New York (BA); Columbia University (MLS)
- Occupations: Writer; filk singer-songwriter
- Writing career
- Genres: Speculative fiction; fan fiction

Roberta Rogow (born March 7, 1942; /ˈroʊ.ɡoʊ/ ROH-goh) is an American writer of speculative fiction and fan fiction and a filk singer-songwriter. She graduated with a BA from Queens CUNY in 1962 and Columbia University with an MLS in 1971.

== Career ==
Rogow is a children's librarian by profession. She started her writing career as the editor of Grip, a media-based fanzine, 1978–1996.

She has written several mystery novels based on a(n imaginary) collaboration between Arthur Conan Doyle and Lewis Carroll. She has also penned a number of short stories, including contributions to the shared world science fiction series Merovingen Nights.

== Critical acclaim ==
In a review of The Problem of the Surly Student, Publishers Weekly stated that "In clear, sometimes lyrical prose, the author paints an engaging and palpable picture of Victorian Oxford with its complex society of dons, undergraduates, scouts and townspeople. Rogow is particularly good at dramatizing the status of women as university students." About the same book, Kirkus Review stated "Rogow provides an interesting look at the manners and mores of the academic world of the Victorians."

S. Malkah Cohen in reviewing Murders in Manatas states: "Ms Rogow has carefully thought thru the many twists and turns that politics, language, religion and more would have taken if the Moors had taken hold of more of southern Europe and became a major world power."

Tim Lieder notes that Rogow writes likeable characters with enjoyable plot contrivances.

== Filking ==
As a filksinger, she has appeared at science fiction conventions, mostly in the Northeast United States, including Albacon. She has also appeared internationally, at Torcon 3.

Rogow has characterized her filk tapes as "electronic fanzines" that reach about 2,000 people.

Roberta was inducted into the Filk Hall of Fame on April 20, 2013.

Roberta has recorded 8 filk tapes and 5 CDs, some of which were self-published. Her current music publisher is Floating Filk Studios.

She has also published 18 songbooks called "Rec-Room Rhymes".

== Personal ==
Rogow lived in Fair Lawn, New Jersey from 1972 to 2002. Since 2002, she has lived in Irvington, New Jersey.

== Works ==
Books & Stories

- Eyes of Lorr. 2021.
- Lorr and Disorder. 2019.
- Madness in Manatas. 2018.
- Malice in Manatas. 2017.
- Menace in Manatas. 2016.
- Mischief in Manatas. 2015.
- Mayhem in Manatas. 2014.
- Murders in Manatas. 2013.
- The Root of the Matter. 2010.
- The Guilty Client. 2009.
- "Peppercorn Rent" (short story) in Teddy Bear Cannibal Massacre. 2005.
- The Problem of the Surly Servant. 2001.
- The Problem of the Evil Editor. 2000.
- The Problem of the Spiteful Spiritualist. 1999.
- The Problem of the Missing Hoyden. 1999.
- The Problem of the Missing Miss. 1998.
- Futurespeak: A Fan's Guide to the Language of Science Fiction. Universal Sales & Marketing. 1991. ISBN 1-55778-347-0.
- Trexindex: An Index to Star Trek Fanzines, Other Worlds Books (Fair Lawn, NJ). 1976.

Filk CDs

- Heroes & Villains (& Some In Between....) (Filk CD). 2012.
- Dark Deeds & Desperate Men (and Women) (Filk CD). 2011.
- One Filk Two Filk Old Filk New Filk (Filk CD). 2009.
- Alive and Filking (Filk CD). 2007.
