= Barclay Shaw =

American professional artist (born 1949)

- Born: October 12, 1949 (age 77); Bronxville, New York, U.S.
- Occupation: Artist

Barclay Shaw (born October 12, 1949) is an American professional artist best known for his fantasy and science fiction artwork. He has been nominated five times for the Hugo Award for Best Professional Artist and has earned a top ten ranking six times in the annual Locus Award for Best Artist. In 1995, his work "Wonderland (wood)" won the Chesley Award for Best Three-Dimensional Art.

== Early life ==
Shaw was born October 12, 1949, in Bronxville, New York. He graduated from Kent School in 1968. In the 1970s he studied at the New England School of Art and Design. He worked for an advertising agency before becoming well known as an illustrator.

== Career ==
Since 1978, Shaw has painted more than 500 book and magazine covers, including covers for books by such science fiction luminaries as Isaac Asimov, C. J. Cherryh, Larry Niven, A. E. van Vogt and Frederik Pohl. His work includes more than 20 cover paintings for The Magazine of Fantasy & Science Fiction. Beside his paintings, he works with sculpture materials. He has also illustrated cards in Last Unicorn Games' collectible card game Heresy: Kingdom Come.

In addition to work for various publishing companies, Shaw freelances as a graphic artist and 3D animation consultant for various U.S. government and private sector clients, including DARPA, the U.S. Army and the National Reconnaissance Office. His oeuvre is distinguished for its eclectic style, surrealistic overtones and crystalline rendering.

The artist credits author Harlan Ellison for giving him his start in the business when he invited Shaw to paint cover illustrations for 16 paperback editions of Ellison's books. In 1995, Paper Tiger Books published a compilation of Shaw's artwork entitled Electric Dreams: The Art of Barclay Shaw (ISBN 1-85028-364-8), with an introduction by Ellison.
