= Jody Lee =

American fantasy artist (born 1958)

Jody A. Lee
- Born: June 18, 1958 (age 66); San Francisco, California, United States
- Awards: Chesley (1989); Gaughan (1992)
- Website: jodylee.org

Jody A. Lee (born June 18, 1958, in San Francisco, California) is a professional fantasy artist from San Francisco known best for her book cover illustrations.

== Biography ==
Lee was born June 18, 1958, in San Francisco, California. She graduated from the Academy of Art College in 1980 with a BA in Illustration. She lives in Morro Bay, California with her husband and two children.

== Career ==
In 1980 Lee relocated to New York to work as a professional artist. The Encyclopedia of Science Fiction says she has provided book cover art for "many fantasies with carefully designed, brightly coloured, and pleasantly decorous covers". Authors she has worked with include Mercedes Lackey, Mickey Zucker Reichert, Lloyd Alexander, Madeleine L'Engle, and others.

She also painted role-playing games' covers such as RuneQuest (third edition, 1984) and Pendragon (first edition, 1985). She illustrated the 1991 and 1996 book covers for A Wrinkle in Time, as published by Dell Yearling.

Lee has provided cover art for publishing companies such as Tor, Bantam, Doubleday, Dell, Warner, and DAW Books.

The Society of Illustrators Museum in New York and the Delaware Art Museum have both held her work.

== Awards and honors ==
She received the Chesley Award for Best Paperback Cover in 1989. She was nominated for the Chesley nine additional times between 1990 and 2004, and was also nominated in 1990 for the Award for Artistic Achievement.

She was nominated for the Locus Award Best Artist in 1991. In 1992, she received the Jack Gaughan Award for Best Emerging Artist.
