= UnCivil Liberties =

2006 American film by Thomas Mercer

- DVD cover
- Directed by: Thomas Mercer
- Written by: Thomas Mercer
- Produced by: Tony Grocki; Thomas Mercer
- Starring: Glenn Allen
- Cinematography: Justin Maine
- Edited by: Tony Grocki
- Music by: Bryan Cady; Chad Lenig
- Release date: June 2006
- Running time: 110 min
- Country: United States
- Language: English
- Budget: $570,000

UnCivil Liberties is a 2006 film directed by Thomas Mercer and starring Glenn Allen and Tony Grocki.

== Plot ==
Set in the near future, UnCivil Liberties imagines a Big Brother–type government that uses technology to spy on its citizens. A militia assassin, Mike Wilson (Glenn Allen), is hired to kill a government agent, Cynthia Porter (Penny Perkins), who is reluctantly helping develop the technology. Wilson, however, cannot bring himself to assassinate Porter, and soon his partner, Sam Norton (Tony Grocki), is hired to kill Wilson.

After Wilson is dead and the militia headquarters are bombed, Norton decides to adopt Wilson's pacifism, and invites Porter to join him to change the future.
