= Thomas Canty =

American artist

- Born: 1952 (age 73–74); Boston, Massachusetts
- Education: Graduate of Massachusetts College of Art and Design.

Thomas Canty (born 1952) is an illustrator and book designer in the field of fantasy literature.

== Career ==
Thomas Canty is credited with pioneering a style of book cover painting and design influenced by such 19th century romantic artists as Alphonse Mucha, Gustav Klimt, and the Pre-Raphaelites. His paintings are featured each year on the cover of the award-winning Year's Best Fantasy and Horror volumes, as well as on numerous other books in the fantasy field and beyond, including: Patricia Kennealy's Keltiad series.

He has worked as an art director and designer for Donald M. Grant Publisher, and collaborated on many projects with editor/author Terri Windling, such as the Fairy Tales series (Ace Books and Tor Books) and the Snow White, Blood Red series (Avon). His poem, A Monster at Christmas was published by Grant in 1985. Canty has won two World Fantasy Awards for Best Artist, among other honors. His work has been exhibited at the Society of Illustrators gallery in New York, as well as in museums and galleries across the United States. He is a founding member of The Newbury Studio and a member of The Endicott Studio.
