= Victo Ngai =

American illustrator raised in Hong Kong (born 1988)

Victo Ngai 倪傳婧
- Born: Guangdong Province
- Education: Rhode Island School of Design
- Known for: illustration, Fine Art
- Website: victo-ngai.com

Victo Ngai (born 1988) is an American-Chinese illustrator raised in Hong Kong. Her work has been described as being highly detailed and precise, referencing comic book drawings, classic children's book illustrations, the work of Japanese painters, and more. Illustrations created by the artist are often considered to contain compelling imagery and unique styling.

== Early life and education ==
Ngai (pronounced nye), was given the name of Victoria, which she later shortened to Victo. Born in Guangdong Province and raised in the former British colony of Hong Kong, current Chinese SAR as the only child of middle-class parents, Ngais' father worked in finance and her mother worked in a variety of jobs, including professor of Chinese literature, newspaper editor and the manager of an investment company. Often bedridden with high fevers until the age of six she took to drawing as a way to keep herself entertained. Her mother sought out traditional herbal treatments, which not only ended her fevers but also inspired her mother's next career as a doctor of Chinese medicine

Her great uncle was a surgeon with a passion for meticulous Chinese ink painting and drawing with him was one of her first art encounters. Ngai also went to many museum exhibitions with her mother as a child.

The artist's family moved from place to place often when she was young, which did not allow for lasting friendships and as a result her childhood was a largely solitary one. Ngai would later credit the instability in her early life with the birth of her artistic identity.

Ngai's mother first noticed her artistic talent and feared that "rigidly technical Chinese art taught in school was stifling it." For two years during summer vacation, Ngai was taken to a private art teacher in Shenzhen on mainland China, which although geographically close, was like "visiting another country" because of the customs immigration process, according to the artist. It was there that Ngai's creative confidence began to flourish.

When Ngai started thinking about an education in illustration, it was a difficult decision, because the artist and her family believed there was a prejudice in Asia against art and design. Her father hoped she would go into finance as a career.

A friend who studied art at Yale, recommended the Rhode Island School of Design and that was the only school she applied to. Ngai was accepted at the Rhode Island School of Design in 2006 where she was mentored by the award-winning illustrator, Chris Buzelli, who importantly taught the young artist that an individual style is something you have to search for within, and not search for outside.

=== Artistic influences ===
The artist drew early influences from the works of Utagawa Kuniyoshi, Hiroshige and her college instructor, Chris Buzelli She also gained inspiration from Norman Rockwell, Winsor McCay, Mary Blair and the fashion designer Alexander McQueen.

== Career ==
When asked why she became an illustrator instead of a fine artist, Ngai replied, "One of my RISD professors told me this back in freshmen year, 'Fine artists like to create problems for themselves while illustrators like to solve problems given to them'. I love drawing and I love problem solving, hence illustration."

Ngai's first work in print appeared in 2009, a year before graduation from RISD, with a work titled Bells and Whistles for PLANSPONSOR Magazine, art directed by SooJin Buzelli. Her second client would be the New York Times'. The artist's next important client would be The New Yorker, which Ngai credited to a portfolio review with Jordan Awan, a former art director at The New Yorker, through a reference by New York Times art director Aviva Michaelov. Working for The New Yorker, the artist began illustrating music reviews and other smaller illustrations and eventually got assignments to work on the full-page fiction pieces. Many of the artist's New Yorker works were art directed by Chris Curry. When creating the first larger format works for The New Yorker, Ngai had no experience in illustrating for fiction and had to confront new creative challenges.

Ngai would go on to illustrate for newspapers, magazines, book publishers and corporate clients such as The Wall Street Journal, The Washington Post, The Boston Globe, Penguin Random House, Abrams Books, Macmillan, General Electric, Lufthansa Airline, NBC, PGA, IMAX, McDonald's, the New York City Subway, Apple, Audible, and Infiniti.

In 2018 Ngai created The Victo Ngai Scholarship Award for the Student Competition held by the Society of Illustrators. The award was presented in honor of Chris Buzelli and the first recipient was Minjua An.

== Noted works ==
Books and film
- Wishes (book illustration), 2021, by Muon Thi Van, published by Orchard Books/ Scholastic
- Serving Fish (book illustration), 2018, by Christopher Caldwell awarded Gold Medal, Spectrum 25 2018
- Dazzle Ships: World War I and the Art of Confusion (book illustrations), 2017, published by Lerner Books, authored by Chris Barton, art directed by Danielle Carnitoa and given the Dilys Evans Founder's Award, by the Society of Illustrators
- Following The Great Wall (book illustrations), 2017, published by Lonely Planet Kids, authored by Stewart Ross
- Chinese Fairy Tales & Fantasies (book illustrations), The Folio Society, 2015
- Dark Fairy Tales, (book cover illustration), art directed by Tian Hang, published by Tang Hang Books, 2015. In Society of Illustrators 57 and American Illustration 34 annuals.
- Time out of Time, (book cover illustration), authored by Maureen McQuerry, art directed by Chad Beckerman, published by Abrams, 2015. In Society of Illustrators 57 and Spectrum 22 annuals.
- The Wound and the Gift (movie illustrations), 2014
- Vicious (the artist's first book cover illustration) authored by V.E. Schwab, art directed by Irene Gallo, 2013, published by Tor Books

Film posters

- Solaris
- Three Colours Trilogy
- THREE COLOURS: RED

Corporate work

- Johnnie Walker Blue Label Special Edition label, 2017
- Infiniti Motion Graphics, 2017, Communication Arts Finalist 2018
- United Nations Stamps, 2017
- Apple Wallpaper, 2017 Lucky Rooster
- Franklin D. Roosevelt Four Freedoms Park, 2016
- NYC MTA Poster, 2013 The Cloisters
- Gallo Wines, Prophecy Wine Labels

Editorial

- Jacks and Queens, Gold Medal, Society of Illustrators a-society-of-illustrators-gold-medal-for-jacks-and-queens/]
- Clover, Silver Medal, Society of Illustrators

== Working process ==
Ngai reads her work assignment text and then narrows the theme of her illustration concept down to the essence of the story, usually focusing on a few phrases or short sentences within the text. Afterwards she likes to have some distance from the material, knowing that for her, the best idea comes when she's not thinking too hard. When an idea for a final work presents itself, Ngai shows her client with at least 3 sketches or options.

Her line work is done with nib pens or rapidograph pens. The textures are done on different pieces of paper with various mediums, like graphite, acrylic and oil pastels. Her final drawings are eventually brought into Photoshop and colored digitally, while working in a limited color palette.

Nearing completion of a work, if it fulfills the commission, or purpose of it and Ngai imagines the people who see the art work might also enjoy the piece as a stand-alone art object, she knows she is done and delivers the work to her client. Ngai signs her works with a symbol, characteristic of a traditional Chinese seal, in which the symbol looks like the first Chinese character of her given name, "傳", but when turned counter clockwise reads "Victo".

Because her work is so labor-intensive, finished works may take three to four days to complete.

== Teaching ==
Ngai has taught at the School of Visual Arts New York, The Illustration Academy and gives guest lectures and workshops at universities and conferences.

== Awards and honors ==
In 2014, at age 26, Ngai was named as one of Forbes Magazine's 30 Under 30 recipients in the category of Art and Style She has received a number of notable awards that include;

- GOLD MEDAL, California Book Awards, 2022 for Wishes.
- Hamilton King Award, Society of Illustrators (2019)
- GOLD MEDAL, Society of Illustrators, (Advertising), Blood Normal for Libresse Sveringe, art directed by Edwina Dennison, 2019
- GOLD MEDAL, Spectrum 25, 2018, for Serving Fish
- Hugo Award Best Professional Artist Award, 2018
- BEST ARTWORK, BSFA, 2018 for Waiting on a Bright Moon by JY Yang published by Tor Books
- SILVER CUBE, Art Directors Club, 2018 for Celebrations at MIXC WORLD, art directed by Yong Liu
- Nominated for the Hugo Award for Best Professional Artist in 2017, 2018 and 2019
- Dilys Evans Founder's Award, Society of Illustrators, 2017 for Dazzle Ships: World War I and the Art of Confusion (Lerner Publishing Group/ Millbrook Press), art directed by Danielle Carnito
- SILVER MEDAL, Society of Illustrators, 2016 for Clover published by TOR, art directed by Irene Gallo) [
- SILVER MEDAL, Society for News Design, 2015 for Colorless Tsukuru Tazaki review published by The Boston Globe

- GOLD MEDAL, GCIA3, 2014 for MoonCatcher published by Plan Sponsor art directed by SooJin Buzelli
- GOLD MEDAL, ASBPE Awards for Design Excellence, 2014 for Deep Thinkers, Computer World Magazine, art directed by April Montgomery
- GOLD MEDAL ASBPE Northeast regional awards, 2013 for The Cobol Brain Drain Computer World Magazine, art directed by April Montgomery
- GOLD MEDAL, Society of Illustrators 2013, Institutional illustration, Utopi, Dellas Graphics, art director Jim Burke
- GOLD Medal Society of Illustrators, 2012 for Jacks and Queens at the Green Mill, published by TOR art directed by[Irene Gallo
- GOLD MEDAL for best use of illustration, Folio 2012 Ozzie Awards for Cobol BrainDrain, Computer World Magazine, art directed by April Montgomery
- GOLD MEDAL in 3x3 ProShow, 2012
- GOLD MEDAL in CMYK Top New Creatives, 2011 (student award)
- Nancy Lee Rhodes Roberts Scholarship Award /Society of Illustrators, Student Illustration, 2010

== Personal life ==
Ngai lives in Los Angeles, California and works in a converted loft space in the Art District of Downtown Los Angeles which she shares with her husband who runs an architecture firm.
