= Jael (artist) =

American artist (1937–2020)

Jael (Jael Brown Ruesch, née Ashton, October 31, 1937 – November 17, 2020) was an American artist/illustrator specializing in science fiction and fantasy art.

== Early life ==
Jael was a busy full-time professional artist/fine artist for fifteen years, when she returned to college to complete a Bachelor of Fine Arts at the University of Utah, while also completing her Secondary Certification in 1973. Afterwards, she taught at several Utah high schools, then taught fine-arts at Clarke College in Las Vegas Nevada between 1974 and 1980, while also publishing and completing many private commissions. During the course of her 68 year artistic career, she completed more than 87,000 creations/commissions.

== Work ==
Her works were featured in galleries, calendars, books, magazines, and other publications. She also created her own perceptualistic (a word taken from William Blake's "Doors of Perception") paintings and was known for her beautiful and extremely accurate portraits.

She was nominated eight times for the science fiction and fantasy Chesley Award. Jael continued to produce art and provide on-line art instruction through her website until her death. Having been an artist for nearly 68 years, she created more than 78,000 paintings and images, most of the originals housed in various collections throughout the world.

== Personal life ==
Jael was a native of Utah, and she lived on the East Coast of the United States at the time of her death. She died on November 17, 2020. She was "persistently coy" about her full name, but it is known that her mother was named Muriel Ashton. She received her BFA from the University of Utah in 1973 and later worked at an art instructor, first at high schools and then at Clarke College in Las Vegas, Nevada; she later moved to New Jersey to work as a science-fiction artist. She was married to Greg Ruesch.

== Publications ==
- Perceptualistics, Paper Tiger, UK, 2002.

=== Contributions to published art collections ===
- The Encyclopedia Of Science Fiction and Fantasy Art Techniques, Quarto Publishing, 1996.
- Spectrum 3, Spectrum 4, and Spectrum 8 (semi-annual collections featuring contemporary fantastic art), Zeising Books
- Paper Tiger Fantasy Art Gallery, Paper Tiger Press, UK, 2002
- Frank Collection, Volume 1
- Frank Collection, Volume 2
- Frank Collection, Volume 3
- Paint or Pixel, The Digital Divide in Illustration Art, edited by Jane Frank, Nonstop Press, New York, 2008
- Myths and Legends, Michael Publishing Company, 2015
- Gods and Goddesses, Michael Publishing Company, 2016
