= Don Maitz =

American science fiction, fantasy, and commercial artist (born 1953)

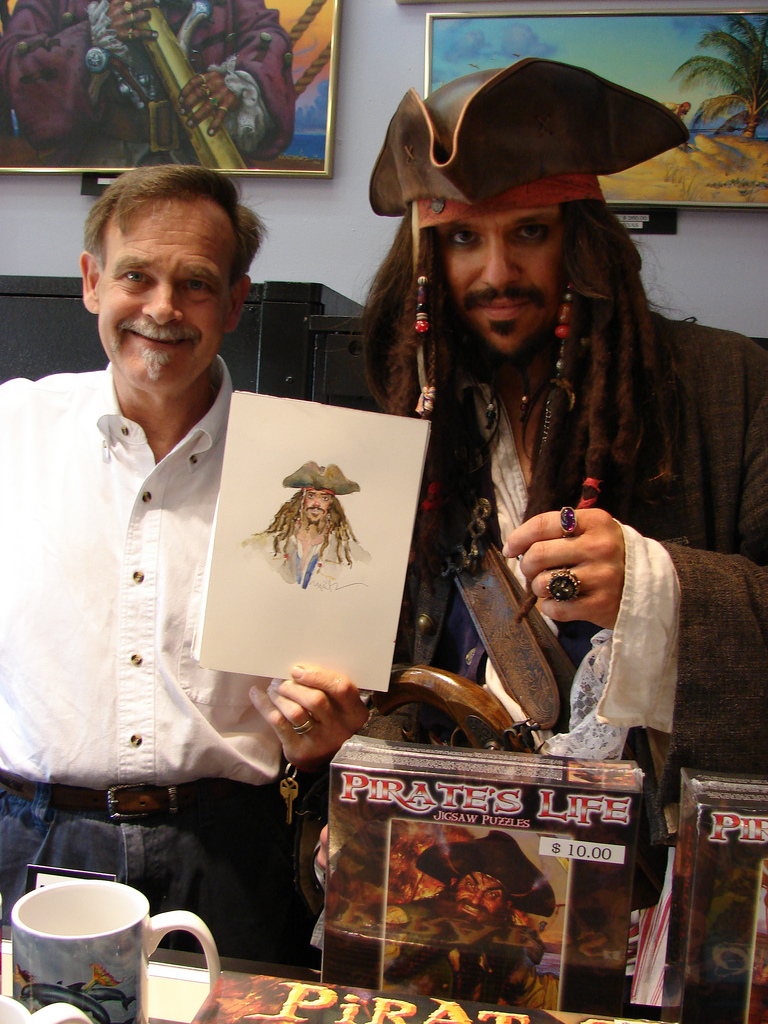
- Don Maitz
- Born: June 10, 1953 (age 72); Plainville, Connecticut
- Education: Paier School of Art
- Movement: science fiction, fantasy
- Spouse: Janny Wurts
- Awards: 1980 World Fantasy Award, 1984 and 1986 Hugo Award

Don Maitz (born June 10, 1953) is an American science fiction, fantasy, and commercial artist. He has twice won the Hugo Award for Best Professional Artist, science fiction's highest honor for an artist, out of 21 nominations. His peers in the Association of Science Fiction and Fantasy Artists have honored him ten times with a Chesley Award for outstanding achievement, and he has received a Silver Medal of Excellence from the Society of Illustrators. Additionally he won the 1980 Artist World Fantasy Award and was a Guest of Honor at the 1996 World Horror Convention.

A native of Plainville, Connecticut, he is a 1975 graduate of the Paier School of Art. His art has adorned the covers of books by Isaac Asimov, Ray Bradbury, C. J. Cherryh, Stephen King, Gene Wolfe, Michael Moorcock, and Raymond E. Feist, among others.

== Genres ==
Maitz's work covers the broad spectrum of fantasy and science fiction as well as horror. He has also painted an extensive collection of pirates, including the "Captain" character of the Captain Morgan brand of rum.

== Published works ==
Maitz has published two books featuring his own works entitled First Maitz and Dreamquests: The Art of Don Maitz. Friedlander Publishing Group released two 90-card sets, each with five "chase" cards in 1994 and 1996. He was also included in Fantasy Art Masters: The Best Fantasy and Science Fiction Artists Show How They Work.

=== First Maitz ===
First Maitz was published in 1988. A detailed overview of the artist's work, his techniques, inspirations, and sketches from start to finished painting. It won the 1989 Locus Award and Readercon Award.

=== Dreamquests: The Art of Don Maitz ===
Published in 1993, Dreamquests is a collection of Maitz's works. Raymond E. Feist gives the introduction, Maitz gives a few thoughts and then come pages and pages of images with a glossary at the end to give a title to the image and where it was used - book cover, magazine cover, etc.

== Raiding Parties ==
Raiding Parties is a pirate-themed card game featuring artwork by Maitz on each card.

== Personal life ==
Maitz resides in Florida with his wife, fantasy novelist and artist Janny Wurts.
