= Rovina Cai =

Australian artist

Rovina Cai (born 1988) is an Australian artist known for her work in illustrating fantasy.

== Recognition ==
Cai won the World Fantasy Award—Artist in 2019 and 2021, and the 2021, 2022, and 2024 Hugo Award for Best Professional Artist; as well, she was a finalist for the 2020 Hugo Award in that category.

In 2016, her illustrations for Margo Lanagan's Tintinnabula earned her the Crichton Award for Children's Book Illustration.

== Education ==
Cai has an MFA in Illustration from the School of Visual Arts.
