= Tom Lloyd (author) =

British writer

- Born: Tom Lloyd-Williams; 1979; Reading
- Occupation: Novelist
- Writing career
- Period: 2006-Present
- Genre: Fantasy
- Website: www.tomlloyd.co.uk

Tom Lloyd-Williams (born 1979) is a British novelist. He is the author of the Twilight Reign series.

== Biography ==
Tom Lloyd was born in the UK and studied Politics and International Relations at Southampton University. He started writing after university and took a job in publishing where he still works. He currently lives in Oxford.

== Bibliography ==
=== The Twilight Reign ===
Comprising:

- The Stormcaller (2006)
- The Twilight Herald (2007)
- The Grave Thief (2008)
- The Ragged Man (2010)
- The Dusk Watchman (2012)
- The God Tattoo, and other short stories of the Land (2013)

=== Empire of a Hundred Houses ===
- Moon's Artifice (2014)
- Old Man's Ghosts (2015)

=== The God Fragments ===
The God Fragments is a heroic fantasy series set in a world where polities compete for so-called god fragments, necessary catalysts to creating the elemental ammunition for mage-guns. God fragments, therefore, are a critical resource for maintaining military independence. The series includes:

- Stranger of Tempest (2016)
- Princess of Blood (2017)
- Knight of Stars (2019)
- God of Night (2020)
