= Gini Koch =

American novelist

- Koch at Dragon Con in 2026
- Born: January 25; California
- Occupations: Novelist, short story author
- Writing career
- Pen name: Anita Ensal, A.E. Stanton, Jemma Chase, J.C. Koch, G.J. Koch
- Genres: Science fiction, fantasy, horror, science fiction romance
- Notable work: The Alien Series
- Movements: Science fiction, fantasy, horror, science fiction romance
- Website: www.ginikoch.com

Gini Koch (born Jeanne Marie Gerrard on January 25, in California), is a science fiction, fantasy, and horror writer based in Phoenix, Arizona. She is best known for the Alien Series (informally known as the "Katherine 'Kitty' Katt" series) novels, published in the United States by DAW Books. She speaks frequently on what it takes to become a successful author and other aspects of writing and the publishing business. She is also the Lead Editor at Raphael's Village, an online, nonpaying ’zine, and is a featured guest columnist, reviewer, and webcaster for Slice of SciFi and It’s Comic Book Day.

== Notable works ==
=== Writing as Gini Koch ===
==== Stand Alone Works ====
- The Happy Acres Haunted Hotel for Active Seniors (Jun 2013)
- Plush Life (Apr 2016)
- Sewers (Jul 2015)
- A Study in Starlets (Sep 2015) also in alt.sherlock.holmes: New Visions of the Great Detective

==== The Alien or the Katherine "Kitty" Katt Series ====
| # | Title | Publication Date | Also In |
|---|---|---|---|
| 0.5 | Alien on the Runway | May 2014 | |
| 1 | Touched by an Alien | Apr 2010 | |
| 2 | Alien Tango | Dec 2010 | |
| 3 | Alien in the Family | Apr 2011 | |
| 4 | Alien Proliferation | Dec 2011 | |
| 5 | Alien Diplomacy | Apr 2012 | |
| 6 | Alien vs. Alien | Dec 2012 | |
| 7 | Alien in the House | May 2013 | |
| 8 | Alien Research | Dec 2013 | |
| 8.5 | Mr Dash Saves the World | Jul 2014 | |
| 9 | Alien Collective | May 2014 | |
| 9.25 | A Clockwork Alien | Aug 2014 | Clockwork Universe: Steampunk vs. Aliens |
| 9.5 | Alien Pick-Up | Nov 2014 | |
| 10 | Universal Alien | Dec 2014 | |
| 11 | Alien Separation | May 2015 | |
| 11.1 | Alien Time Warp | Aug 2015 | Temporally Out of Order |
| 12 | Alien in Chief | Dec 2015 | |
| 13 | Camp Alien | Dec 2015 | |
| 14 | Alien Nation | Dec 2016 | |
| 15 | Alien Education | May 2017 | |
| 16 | Aliens Abroad | Feb 2018 | |
| 17 | Aliens Like Us | ? | |
| 18 | Alien Galaxy | ? | |
| 19 | Alien Rescue | ? | |
| 20 | Alien Reckoning | ? | |

==== The Necropolis Enforcement Files Series ====
1. The Night Beat (June 2012) also in Sensational Six: Action and Adventure in Sci Fi, Fantasy and Paranormal Romance
2. Night Music (2019?)

==== Non-fiction ====
- Random Musings from the Funny Girl: Or How to Make the Most of Multiple Personality Disorder (Feb 2014)

=== Writing as G.J. Koch ===
==== The Alexander Outland Series ====
1. Alexander Outland: Space Pirate (June 2012)

==== The Martian Alliance Series ====
1. The Royal Scam (Sep 2011) also in Alliance Rising
2. Three Card Monte (Oct 2012) also in Alliance Rising
3. A Bug's Life (Sep 2015) also in Alliance Rising

=== Writing as Anita Ensal ===
==== Stand Alone Works ====
- A Cup of Joe (Nov 2012)

==== The Neighborhood Series ====
1. Contingency Plan (Dec 2011)
2. Being Neighborly (Apr 2012)

=== Writing as A.E. Stanton ===
==== The New West Series ====
1. When Josie Comes Home (Oct 2011)
2. Deacon's Ark (Dec 2011)

=== Writing as Jemma Chase ===
==== Stand alone works ====
- Hotter Than Hell (Oct 2011)
- The Disciple (Dec 2011)

=== Anthologies ===
| Writing As | Collection or Anthology | Contents | Publication Date |
|---|---|---|---|
| Gini Koch | Clockwork Universe: Steampunk vs. Aliens | A Clockwork Alien | Aug 2014 |
| Gini Koch | Two Hundred and Twenty-One Baker Streets: An Anthology of Holmesian Tales Across Time and Space | add name of story here | Oct 2014 |
| Gini Koch | Unidentified Funny Objects 3 | Live at the Scene | Oct 2014 |
| Gini Koch | Sensational Six: Action and Adventure in Sci Fi, Fantasy and Paranormal Romance | The Night Beat | Nov 2014 |
| Gini Koch | Temporally Out of Order | Alien Time Warp | Aug 2015 |
| Gini Koch | Unidentified Funny Objects 4 | add name of story here | Oct 2015 |
| Gini Koch | alt.sherlock.holmes: New Visions of the Great Detective | A Study in Starlets | Apr 2016 |
| Gini Koch | Were- | Missy the Were-Pomeranian vs the Masters of Mediocre Doom | Sep 2016 |
| Gini Koch | Unidentified Funny Objects 5 | add name of story here | Sep 2016 |
| Gini Koch | MECH: Age of Steel | add name of story here | Jul 2017 |
| Gini Koch | All Hail Our Robot Conquerors! | add name of story here | Sep 2017 |
| Gini Koch | Second Round: A Return to the Ur-Bar | add name of story here | Jun 2018 |
| Gini Koch | Guilds & Glaives | add name of story here | Jun 2018 |
| Gini Koch | Unidentified Funny Objects 7 | add name of story here | Sep 2018 |
| Gini Koch | Alien (17 Book Series) | Books 1-17 | ? |
| G.J. Koch | Kaiju Rising: Age of Monsters | With Bright Shining Faces | Jan 2014 |
| G.J. Koch | Alliance Rising | The Royal Scam Three Card Monte A Bug's Life | Nov 2015 |
| G.J. Koch | Unidentified Funny Objects 6 | add name of story here | Oct 2017 |
| Jemma Chase | Amazing & Waiting: Two Novelettes | add name of story here | Nov 2012 |
| Jemma Chase | The Disciple & Other Stories of the Paranormal | Strange Protection Hotter Than Hell Waiting Amazing The Disciple | Mar 2015 |
| Anita Ensal | The Book of Exodi | The Last Day on Earth | May 2009 |
| Anita Ensal | Boondocks Fantasy | Being Neighborly | Jan 2011 |
| Anita Ensal | Love and Rockets | Wanted | Dec 2017 |

== Accolades ==
Touched By an Alien was named one of the Top 10 Science Fiction and Fantasy Novels of 2010 by Booklist.
