= James Maxey =

American author

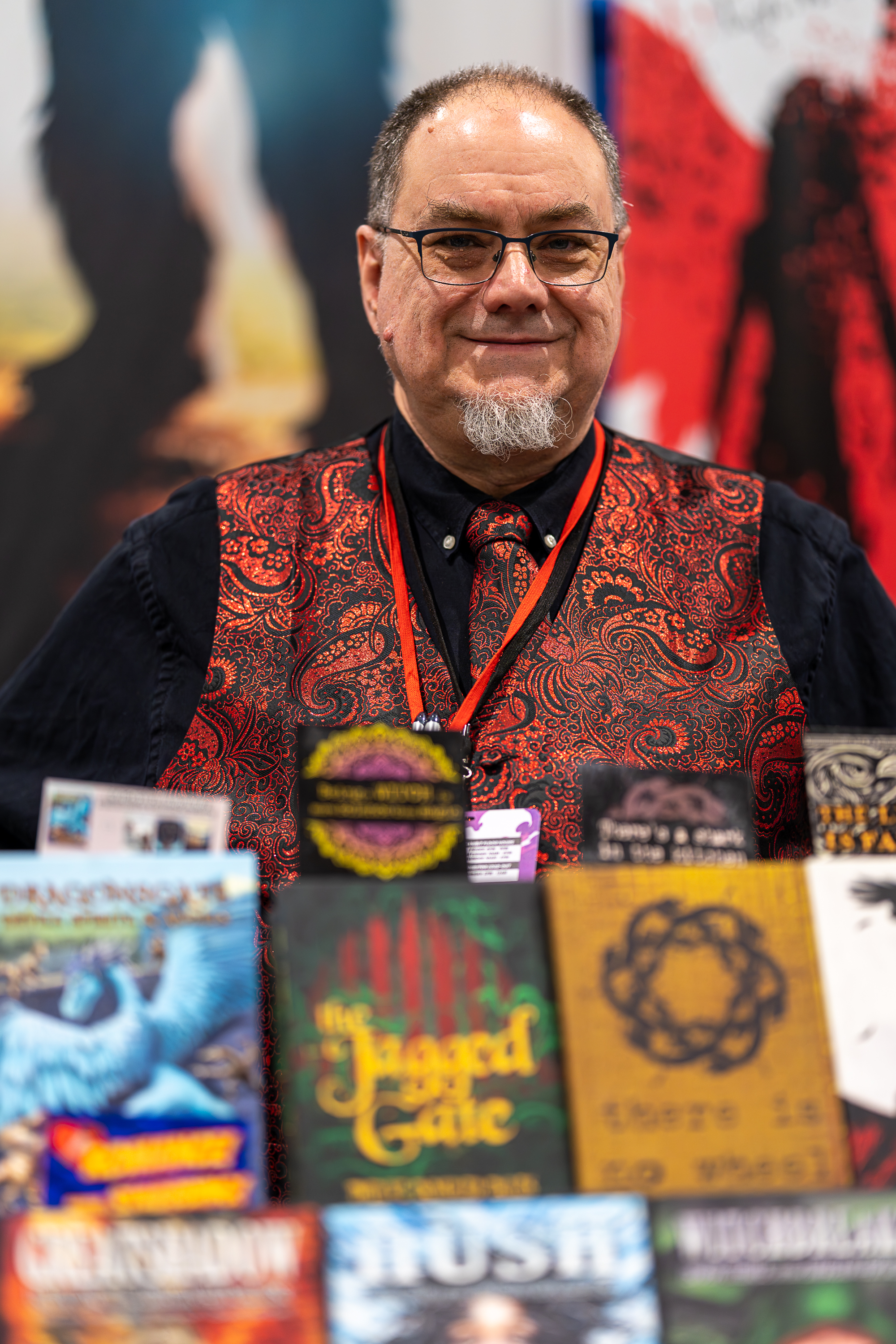
- Maxey at Animate! Raleigh in 2026
- Born: Roanoke, Virginia, U.S.
- Occupation: Writer
- Writing career
- Period: 2001–present
- Website: jamesmaxey.blogspot.com

James Maxey is an American author best known for his work in the fields of science fiction and fantasy. He has won the Phobos Award, been nominated for the WSFA Small Press Award, is a 2015 Piedmont Laureate, and reprinted in the Year's Best Science Fiction and Fantasy. In addition to writing fiction, Maxey has also reviewed novels for the online magazine InterGalactic Medicine Show (IGMS), and appeared on panels and taught workshops at numerous conventions on the east coast. He currently lives in Hillsborough, North Carolina with his wife, Cheryl.

== Fiction ==
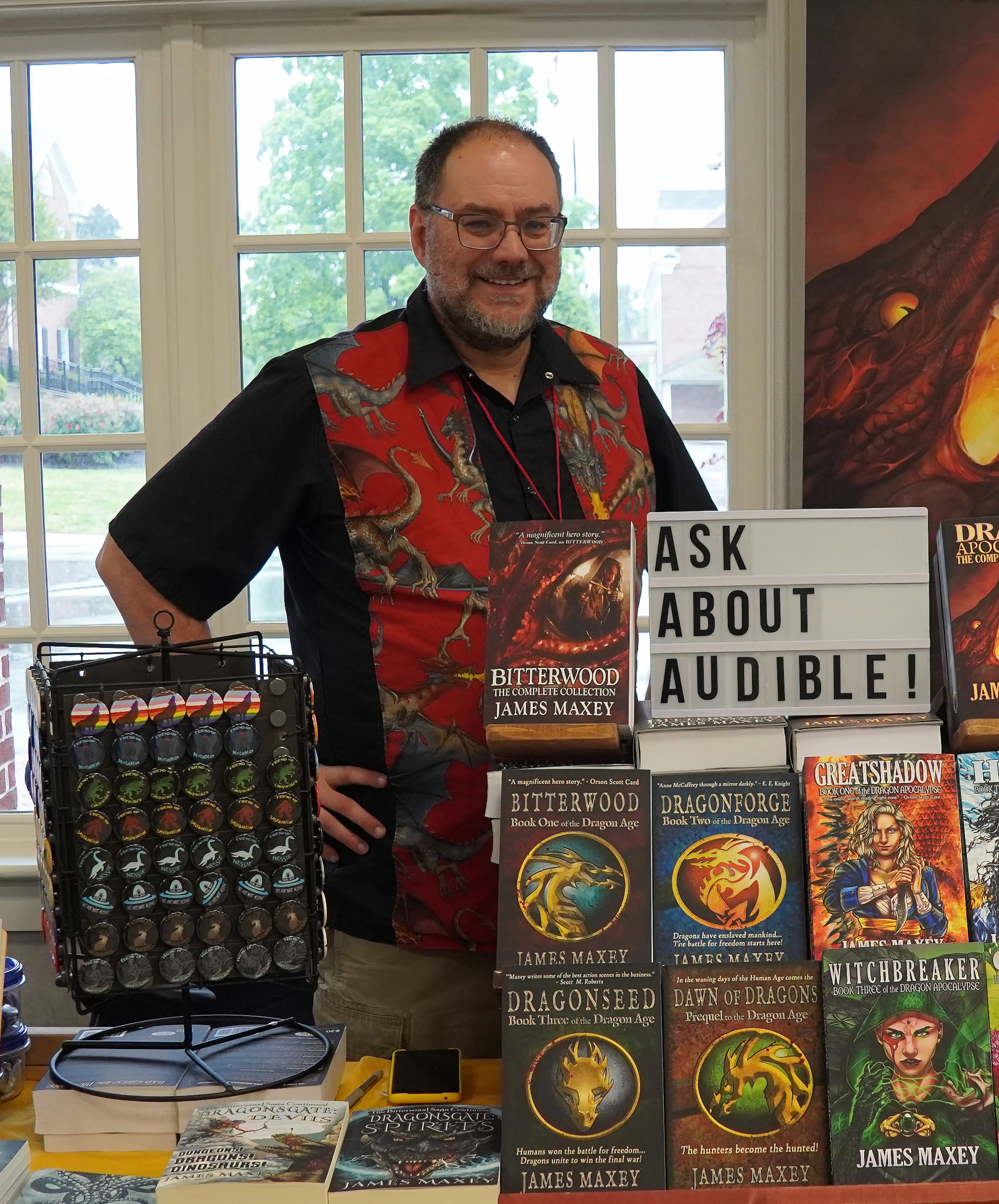
James Maxey at RavenCon

Before becoming widely published, Maxey attended several notable writer's workshops, including Odyssey Writing Workshop and Orson Scott Card's Writing Boot Camp. Maxey's short fiction has been published in Asimov's Science Fiction, InterGalactic Medicine Show, and numerous anthologies. He has to-date published nine novels, six from Solaris Books (three in the Dragon Age trilogy and three in the Dragon Apocalypse trilogy). Rights to The Dragon Age books were sold internationally, with all three books being translated into German and French.

== Reception ==
Cindy Lynn Speer of SF Site called Nobody Gets the Girl "very well written." The blog Guilded Earlobe gave Maxey's audiobook Bitterwood an A− rating. Bull Spec Magazine wrote, "James Maxey's Dragon Apocalypse series has been a lot of fun so far — and yet every time I say that I feel remiss in focusing on the fun, and not enough on how creative these books are." The book review website Founding Fields saying, "James Maxey is a freaking genius. I want more." George T. Dodds of SF Site wrote of Maxey's Dragonforge, "While I was entertained and the plot was compelling and well structured, the story left me feeling underwhelmed in a number of ways." Dodds expounded, "My biggest problem with Dragonforge is that the dragons are basically humans in dragon suits ... a bit more of Cthulhu-like incomprehensibility and alienness to their behaviour would have made them more interesting."

== Bibliography ==
Novels

Super-Hero novels

Nobody Gets the Girl (2003)

Burn Baby, Burn (2012)

Covenant (2017)

Dragon Age Trilogy

Dawn of Dragons (prequel, 2013)

Bitterwood (2007)

Dragonforge (2008)

Dragonseed (2009)

Dragon Apocalypse Trilogy

Great Shadow (Jan. 2012)

Hush (June 2012)

Witchbreaker (Dec. 2012)

Cinder (2016)

Lawless Series

Cut-Up Girl: Lawless Book One (2018)

Big Ape: Lawless Book Two (2018)

Victory: Lawless Book Three (2018)

Non-Series Novels

Bad Wizard (2015)

Anthologies

Empire of Dreams and Miracles: The Phobos Science Fiction Anthology (v. 1) (2002)

Absolutely Brilliant in Chrome (2005)

Prime Codex (2007)

InterGalactic Medicine Show (2008)

Masked (2010)

InterGalactic Medicine Show Awards Anthology (2012)

Collection

There Is No Wheel (2011)

The Jagged Gate: Twelve Tangled Tales (2017)
