= Rowena Morrill =

American artist (1944–2021)

- Born: September 14, 1944; Mississippi, U.S.
- Died: February 11, 2021 (aged 76)
- Known for: Cover art, painting, illustration
- Movement: Fantastic art

Rowena A. Morrill (September 14, 1944 – February 11, 2021), also credited as Rowena and Rowina Morril, (Note: "Rowina Morril" may be a typo, but has been used in multiple works even where the signature on the cover artwork is clearly "Rowena". The 22nd printing of Dragonsong by Anne McCaffrey is an example of this alternate name credit.) was an American artist known for her science-fiction and fantasy illustration, and is credited as one of the first female artists to impact paperback cover illustration. Her notable artist monographs included The Fantastic Art of Rowena, Imagine (in France), Imagination (in Germany), and The Art of Rowena and her work has also been included in a variety of anthologies including Tomorrow and Beyond and Infinite Worlds.

== Early life ==
Morrill was born September 14, 1944. From a family of musicians, Rowena initially studied music. She broke off those studies when as a teenager she married a soldier. At an Army wives' club she began classes in drawing.

Morrill complete a BA at the University of Delaware (1971) and continued her studies at the Tyler School of Arts in Philadelphia.

== Career ==
After leaving the Tyler program, she would work for an advertising agency in New York City. She showed her portfolio to Charles Volpe at Ace Books, and was commissioned by Volpe to illustrate a romance cover. Morrill's first design for a horror novel was Jane Parkhurst's Isobel (1977). Morrill continued to work in horror, producing cover art for H. P. Lovecraft collections before turning her attention to science fiction and fantasy. To create these illustrations, Morrill used oil on illustration board, coating the image with a high-gloss glaze and thin coats of paint.

Morrill created covers for books by such authors as Anne McCaffrey, Philip K. Dick, Isaac Asimov, Samuel R. Delany, Theodore Sturgeon, Piers Anthony and Madeleine L'Engle. As well, her paintings have appeared on hundreds of calendars, portfolios and in magazines such as Playboy, Heavy Metal, Omni, Art Scene International, and Print Magazine.

She was nominated for the Hugo Award four times in the Best Artist category. In 1983, her book The Fantastic Art of Rowena was nominated for the Hugo Award for Best Nonfiction Book, and the Locus Award for Nonfiction/Reference. She received the 1984 British Fantasy Award. She was named Artist Guest of Honor for Chicon 7, the 70th World Science Fiction Convention, held in 2012. She was named 2017 Guest of Honor at the World Fantasy Convention held in San Antonio, TX. She received the 2020 World Fantasy Life Achievement Award.

Images emerged following the fall of Saddam Hussein in Iraq, that Morrill's paintings, King Dragon and Shadows Out of Hell, were hanging in one of his residences. Morrill cautioned they were copies, as she had sold the originals to a Japanese collector.

The posthumous Paintings and Drawings of Rowena by Kim DeMulder was financed via a Kickstarter campaign, and has been nominated for a 2023 Locus Award for Best Illustrated and Art Book.

== Plagiarism of Morrill's work ==
In 2003, a Flash animation slideshow titled "Family Art Corner" was released anonymously, alleging that a woman named Jan "Tamar" McRae had plagiarized the work of many artists, including Morrill, for reproduction in proselytization tracts printed by the Children of God cult. After the slideshow was released, both McRae and Karen Zerby, leader of the Children of God, acknowledged that McRae had copied the work of others, and McRae admitted wrongdoing.

== Personal life ==
Morrill died in February 2021, at the age of 76, after a long illness.
