= Paul Lewin =

Jamaican artist

- Born: 1973; Kingston, Jamaica
- Website: www.paullewinart.com

Paul Lewin is an artist who resides in Oakland, CA. He was born in Kingston, Jamaica in 1973 and relocated to Miami with his family when he was five.

== Early life ==
Lewin was influenced by his father, and they would watch sci-fi and fantasy movies together. As a child he loved to draw the spaceships and military jets that he had seen in the movies.

== Work ==
Lewin's paintings are inspired by Afro-Caribbean folklore and African culture, such as stories of the Jamaican national hero Nanny of the Maroons Nanny, who led a group called the Maroons who escaped slavery and created their own civilization in the mountains. Lewin said: "My mom would tell me stories about back in the old country where she grew up in Jamaica...I want each piece to tell a story in the same way that the stories have been passed down for generations, dating all of the way back to Africa." Lewin continues, "The Caribbean Islands are a melting pot of many different cultures, African, French, British, Chinese, Indian, the Middle East, and Taino just to name a few....as they began to take root in their new lands the folklore of the Africans began to fuse with many of the other cultural traditions."

Lewin's imagery is also influenced by surrealism and science fiction. "I like to mix traditional Caribbean and African motifs with surreal visions of nature and the ancestry that surrounds us daily." Lewin's work was featured in a show at San Francisco's Live Worms Gallery celebrating Octavia Butler's legacy. Lewin's work is the cover imagery for the 2017 Seven Stories Press reprintings of the Octavia Butler novels The Parable of the Talents and The Parable of the Sower.

Lewin has had two solo shows (2015, 2016) at the Betti Ono Gallery in Oakland, CA.

== Awards ==
- 2017 World Fantasy Award for Best Artist (nominee)
