= Donato Giancola =

American painter

- Born: 1967 (age 58–59); Colchester, Vermont, U.S.
- Known for: Fantasy art
- Notable work: Magic: The Gathering
- Awards: World Fantasy Award, Chesley Awards, Hugo Award for Best Professional Artist

Donato Giancola (born 1967) is an American artist specializing in narrative realism with science fiction and fantasy content, including images for Tolkien's Middle-earth.

Giancola has won honors including a World Fantasy Award, a Hamilton King Award, and many Chesley Awards for his illustrations.

== Biography ==
Donato Giancola was born and raised in Colchester, near Burlington, in the state of Vermont. He has lived in Brooklyn with his wife and two daughters.

Giancola first majored in electrical engineering at the University of Vermont, but left for Syracuse University to seriously pursue painting in 1989. He graduated with a BFA in 1992.

Giancola describes himself and his work as a "classical-abstract-realist working with science fiction and fantasy" and lists Hans Memling, Jan van Eyck, Velázquez, Caravaggio, Vermeer, Piet Mondrian, Rembrandt, Rubens and Titian as his favorite artists.

Giancola has illustrated cards for the Magic: The Gathering collectible card game. He has been described as a "cult hero" among fantasy collectible card game players. In 2008, the Bennington Banner referred to him as "arguably the most popular and successful sci-fi/fantasy artist working today". His paintings of J. R. R. Tolkien's fantasy world have been described as making him "the Caravaggio of Middle-earth".

In 2021, the U.S. Postal Service announced that a "three ounce" stamp honoring Ursula K. Le Guin would be issued later that year. It features her portrait, based on a 2006 photograph, against a background scene from The Left Hand of Darkness, created by Giancola and art director Antonio Alcalá.

== Honors ==
=== Chesley Awards ===
Giancola has been awarded a Chesley Award from the Association of Science Fiction & Fantasy Artists in the following years:

- 1997: Best Cover Illustration, Paperback
- 1999, 2001: Best Product Illustration
- 2002: 4 awards inc Best Cover Illustration
- 2004: Best Cover Illustration
- 2005: joint winner Best Cover Illustration
- 2006: Best Cover Illustration
- 2007: Best Monochrome Work
- 2008: 5 awards inc Best Cover Illustration
- 2009: 2 awards inc Best Cover Illustration
- 2011: Best Interior Illustration
- 2014: Best Color Work
- 2015: Best Product Illustration
- 2016: Best Color Work
- 2017: Best Product Illustration

=== Other ===
- 2004 Art Renewal Center, International Salon, first place, figurative category.
- 2004 World Fantasy Award for Best Artist.
- 2006, 2007, 2009 Hugo Award for Best Professional Artist; also nominated six times.
- 2008 Hamilton King Award for Excellence, Society of Illustrators.
- 2024 Tolkien Society Award for Best Artwork for "Frodo's Inheritance".

== Art exhibitions ==
- Donato Giancola: From Middle Earth to Outer Space and Beyond, Huntsville Museum of Art, 2013-2014.
- Magical Adventures: Fantasy Art from The Frank Collection, University of Maryland, College Park, 2004.
- Illustrators, The Society of Illustrators Annual Exhibition of Illustration, 128 East 63rd Street, New York, New York. 1999-2004.
- The Art of 'The Lord of the Rings', Exhibition of book cover and interior illustration, Bailey/Howe Library, University of Vermont, 2002.

== Books ==
- Middle-Earth: Visions of a Modern Myth (2010), Underwood Books.
- Middle-Earth: Journeys in Myth and Legend (2019), Dark Horse Books. ISBN 978-1-5067-1086-0
