= Bob Eggleton =

American artist (born 1960)

- Eggleton at Dragon Con in 2026
- Born: September 13, 1960 (age 66); Concord, Massachusetts
- Known for: Science fiction, Fantasy, Painting

Bob Eggleton (born September 13, 1960) is an American science fiction, fantasy and horror artist. Eggleton is a nine-time Hugo Award–winner for Best Pro Artist in science fiction and fantasy, first winning in 1994. He won the Hugo Award for Best Related Book in 2001 for his art book Greetings from Earth. He also won the Chesley Award for Artistic Achievement in 1999 and was the guest of honor at Chicon 2000.

His illustrations have appeared in Dark Horse Comics, Random House Godzilla books, IDW’s Godzilla comic series and on covers for Famous Monsters of Filmland, G-Fan & Japanese Giants magazines.

In film, he has worked as a concept artist on Sphere (1997), Jimmy Neutron Boy Genius (2001) and The Ant Bully (2006). He also illustrated matte paintings on the short film The Idol (2007) and was an extra in the Millennium Godzilla film Godzilla Against Mechagodzilla (2002).

== Early life ==
Bob Eggleton was born September 13, 1960, in Concord, Massachusetts.

== Style and subjects ==
Eggleton's drawing and paintings cover a wide range of genre topics, often depicting dinosaurs and prehistoric life, dragons and fantasy creatures, giant monsters such as Godzilla, Lovecraftian entities, space vistas and vintage rocket ships, etc. His view on spaceships were that they should look organic, and claimed that as a child, he was disappointed with the space shuttles and rockets NASA produced; they were nothing like fantasy artists of the twenties and thirties had promised. His fascination with dragons originated with his childhood interest of dinosaurs, which can be seen in the book Greetings from Earth. His paintings are commissioned and bought at science fiction conventions and used as book covers.

Eggleton received massive encouragement from his father, in the form of books, supplies, visits to museums of space and aeronautics and support during the career choices he made. Eggleton dropped out of his art college, because he felt it was not for him.

Eggleton is a fan of Toho's Godzilla film franchise, and has illustrated numerous comics, magazines and children's books based on the character. He has also illustrated cards for the Magic: The Gathering collectible card game.

Asteroid 13562 was named Bobeggleton in his honor.

== Bibliography ==
- First Men in the Moon (1989)
- Alien Horizons (1995, UK)
- The Book of Sea Monsters (1998)
- Greetings from Earth (2000)
- Dragonhenge (2002)
- Primal Darkness (2003)
- The Star Dragons (2004)
- Dragons' Domain (2010)
