= Gideon (disambiguation) =

Gideon is a character in the Hebrew Bible.

Gideon may also refer to:

- Gideon (name) is a male given name and surname of Hebrew origin

== Religion ==
- Gideon (Book of Mormon), a figure in the Book of Mormon
- Gideons International, distributor of copies of the Bible

== Arts, entertainment, and media ==
=== Film and television ===
- Gideon (Charmed), a character in the television show Charmed
- Gideon (film), a 1998 film starring Christopher Lambert
- Gideon (The Flash), an artificial intelligence from the television series The Flash
- Gideon (Legends of Tomorrow), an artificial intelligence from the television series Legends of Tomorrow
- Gideon (play), a 1961 Broadway drama by Paddy Chayefsky
- Gideon (TV series), an early 1980s children's TV cartoon series
- Gideon's Way, 1960s British television crime series
- Gideon Oliver, 1989 television series
- "Gideon: Tuba Warrior", a VeggieTales episode
- George Gideon of Scotland Yard, a fictional detective in novels, film and television created by John Creasey
- Jason Gideon, a character in the television show Criminal Minds
- Moff Gideon, the main antagonist of the Star Wars television series The Mandalorian
- Gideon, Belle and Rumplestiltskin's son in the TV series Once Upon a Time
- Gideon Gleeful, a character from the television series Gravity Falls
- Gideon Gemstone, a character in the television series The Righteous Gemstones
- Gideon Graves, the main antagonist of the graphic novel series Scott Pilgrim
- Gideon Grey, a character from Zootopia

=== Literature ===
- Gideon Planish, 1943 novel by Sinclair Lewis
- The Gideon Trilogy, 2006 science fiction book series
- Gideon the Ninth, 2019 science fantasy novel
- Gideon Nav, a protagonist in The Locked Tomb series of novels
- Gideon Fell, a fictional detective in novels created by John Dickson Carr

=== Music ===
- Gideon (album), a 1980 album by Kenny Rogers
- Gideon (band), an American hardcore band
- Gideon (Handel), a 1769 oratorio pastiche
- "Gideon", a song by My Morning Jacket from Z
- "Visions of Gideon", a song by Sufjan Stevens from Call Me by Your Name: Original Motion Picture Soundtrack (2017)

=== Other arts, entertainment, and media ===
- Gideon (comics), a Marvel Comics supervillain
- Gideon Mace, a Marvel Comics villain
- Gideon Stargrave, Near Myths comics character
- Armoured Gideon, 2000 AD comics character
- Gideon Falls, horror comic book series
- Sam Gideon, the main character in the video game Vanquish
- Gideon Jura, a Planeswalker in the trading card game Magic: The Gathering

== Military ==
- Gideon Force, Ethiopian regular force during World War II
- Operation Gideon (disambiguation)

== Places ==
- Gideon, Missouri, U.S.
- Gideon, Oklahoma, U.S.
- Kfar Gideon, northern Israel

== Other ==
- Gideon Graves, the big bad of Scott Pilgrim
- Gideon McDuck, a Disney character
- Gideon v. Wainwright, a major American court battle which required state courts to provide indigent defendants with legal counsel at taxpayer expense
- Global Infectious Disease Epidemiology Network (GIDEON), a medical decision support tool
- a character in the Disney 1940 animated film Pinocchio
- the Rastafarian term for Armageddon

== See also ==
- Sword of Gideon, a 1986 Canadian television film
- The Mark of Gideon, Star Trek episode
