= Harrow the Ninth =

2020 science fantasy novel by Tamsyn Muir

- First edition
- Author: Tamsyn Muir
- Audio read by: Moira Quirk
- Cover artist: Tommy Arnold
- Language: English
- Series: The Locked Tomb #2
- Genre: Science fantasy
- Publisher: Tor Books
- Publication date: 4 August 2020
- Publication place: New Zealand
- Media type: Print (hardcover) ebook Audiobook
- Pages: 512 pp
- ISBN: 9781250313225 (hardcover ed.)
- Preceded by: Gideon the Ninth
- Followed by: Nona the Ninth

Harrow the Ninth is a 2020 science fantasy novel by the New Zealand writer Tamsyn Muir. It is the second in Muir's The Locked Tomb series, preceded by Gideon the Ninth (2019) and followed by Nona the Ninth (2022) and forthcoming Alecto the Ninth (TBC).

== Plot ==
In the present day, narrated in second-person, Harrowhark Nonagesimus discovers that her ascension to Lyctorhood (Note: As portrayed in – and requiring the death of – Gideon the Ninth) was imperfect. John, Emperor of the Nine Houses, nevertheless fulfils his promise to renew her House, waking several hundred new citizens from cryogenic sleep. He explains the nature of Lyctorhood, which he has obscured from the Houses. John resurrected humanity from cataclysm by impossibly powerful necromancy, inadvertently spawning Resurrection Beasts, the ghosts of the dead planets, that hunt Lyctors. Fellow Lyctor Ianthe Tridentarius gives Harrow a series of instructive sealed letters seemingly penned by Harrow herself, but does not explain why.

In alternating chapters, portrayed in third-person, Harrow recounts events that directly contradict those of Gideon the Ninth. Instead of Gideon, her cavalier is Ortus Nigenad, who is occupied with the epic poem The Noniad. She reveals to him that she is insane: in both past and present, she is missing large portions of her memory, and she hallucinates "the Body", the beautiful woman she saw in the Locked Tomb as a child.

In the past, arriving at Canaan House, Teacher informs the heirs and cavaliers that there is a beast lying in the heart of the facility called “the Sleeper.” Except for Harrow and Ianthe, every character who died in the events of Gideon the Ninth survives in this account and vice versa.

In the present day, Harrow is taken to the Emperor's space station, the Mithraeum. John reveals he and his Lyctors have been fighting Resurrection Beasts for millennia; most have been lost to madness or battle. The survivors are a vicious and embittered Mercymorn, a flippant Augustine and a stoic, relentless Ortus, who attempts to kill Harrow multiple times, deeming her a threat.

Harrow and Ianthe are taught how to travel to the River, an otherworldly afterlife, which in addition to providing faster-than-light travel allows them to defeat the Resurrection Beasts by destroying their astral bodies. The Lyctoral process is fundamental to this: while the Lyctor travels the astral River, the echo of the consumed cavalier's soul controls the physical body to ensure its survival. Both Harrow and Ianthe struggle with this. Harrow uses her necromantic skill of manipulating bone to replace Ianthe's once-severed sword arm with a functioning skeleton arm.

The Lyctors prepare to battle the nearest Beast, killing planets to prevent it feeding. On one such mission, Harrow encounters Camilla Hect, whom she believed dead. She in fact works for "Blood of Eden," a terrorist organization seeking to foil the Empire's colonialist ambitions, led by the mysterious Commander Wake. She helps Harrow learn that Palamedes (to whom she was cavalier) is not truly dead; his spirit is sequestered in a tiny bubble inside the River.

Harrow learns that the Canaan House of her supposed past is a similar such bubble: those present other than Harrow are the souls of the dead from the real events of Gideon the Ninth. Prior to writing the letters, she requested Ianthe perform brain surgery to obscure her memories of Gideon, ensuring her soul could not truly be absorbed. The spirits make a last-ditch attempt to fight the Sleeper by summoning Matthias Nonius, legendary Noniad swordsman. They kill the Sleeper, who is unmasked as the ghost of Commander Wake. Marta, Protesilaus and Ortus resolve to follow Matthias into the River to face the Beast alongside "Ortus" the First, whose name is really Gideon the First. Abigail and Magnus, Fifth House necromancer and cavalier, urge Harrow to return to her life, but she is unable, hallucinating a variety of alternate universes.

It is revealed that the second person perspective was narrated by Gideon Nav, who awakens in Harrow's body. Alongside the remaining Lyctors she makes her way to the Emperor's chambers; he is failing to interrogate Wake, who has possessed the corpse of the Lyctor Cytherea. Surprised by Gideon Nav's presence, Mercymorn and Augustine reveal a long-anticipated plan known as dios apate: using semen stolen from John, Wake artificially inseminated herself. The child was intended as a bomb to breach the Locked Tomb, releasing its prisoner: Alecto, John's cavalier, whose "perfect lyctorhood" gave him limitless power while preserving her life. The plan failed, and the Emperor's child survived as Gideon herself.

Mercymorn destroys John's body, but he effortlessly returns and kills her, shedding his affable persona and demanding fealty from all Lyctors but the non-present Harrow. Augustine throws the Mithraeum itself into the River, but Ianthe intervenes to save John, dooming Augustine. As they fight to escape, it is revealed that Gideon the First died fighting the Beast, allowing his compartmentalised cavalier, Pyrrha Dve, to take permanent control. Still in a vision of the Locked Tomb where she first met the Body, Harrow climbs into the empty coffin and falls unconscious again. Six months in the future, an unknown person awakens in an apartment in an unnamed city with Camilla Hect. (Note: As portrayed in the sequel Nona the Ninth.)

== Reception ==
Constance Grady of Vox writes that Harrow the Ninth is "delightfully, beautifully weird, a book even odder than its predecessor but just as bewitching." Calling the book "gorgeously Baroque," Jason Sheehan of NPR writes that it was "so beautifully, wildly and precariously weird that I couldn't help sliding through page after page, rolling around blood-drunk in the mess of it all." The Library Journal, Publishers Weekly, and Booklist also gave the book positive reviews, as did authors Alix E. Harrow, Django Wexler, Kiersten White, and Rebecca Roanhorse.

Several reviewers commented on the book's unusual narrative complexity. Liz Bourke of Locus wrote that its "constant shifts of time and perspective, and the unreliability of its narrator, mean that it never quite attains a coherent narrative through-line or a thematic argument that a reader can get their teeth into." Others were more positive, taking this as a conscious stylistic choice on Muir's part: Sheehan called it "wickedly challenging to read, deliberately impossible to comprehend in full". Grady's review concludes "as bewildered as I am at times by Harrow the Ninth, I always enjoy being bewildered by Muir."

Year	Award	Category	Result	Ref
2020	Amazon Best of 2020	SF & Fantasy	Listed	
2020	Goodreads Choice Awards	Fantasy	Runner-up	
2021	Chesley Award	Best Hardcover Illustration	Finalist	
2021	Hugo Award	Novel	Finalist	
2021	Locus Award	Fantasy Novel	Finalist	
