= The Sweet Miracle =

The Sweet Miracle, may refer to:

- "The Sweet Miracle", a short story by Eça de Queiroz, 1902
- "The Sweet Miracle", a poem by William Force Stead, 1922
- "Sweet Miracle", a song by Rush from Vapor Trails, 2002
