= Chesley Award for Best Cover Illustration – Hardcover =

The Chesley Award for Best Cover Illustration – Hardcover has been presented every year since 1985 by the Association of Science Fiction and Fantasy Artists to recognize achievement in the illustration of hardcover science fiction & fantasy. Each year the award recognizes works that were eligible for the award during the preceding year.

== Winners and nominees ==
Year	Winner	Other nominees
2002	Donato Giancola for Ashling by Isobelle Carmody (Tor Books, 2001)	Bob Eggleton for The Dragon Society by Lawrence Watt-Evans (Tor); Don Maitz for Kingdoms of Light by Alan Dean Foster (Warner Aspect); Michael Whelan for Otherland: Sea of Silver Light by Tad Williams (DAW); Keith Parkinson for The Pillars of Creation by Terry Goodkind (Tor)
2003	Todd Lockwood for The Thousand Orcs by R. A. Salvatore (Wizards of the Coast, 2002)	Alan Pollack for Argonaut by Stanley Schmidt (Tor); Mark Harrison for Diuturnity's Dawn by Alan Dean Foster (Del Rey); Bob Eggleton for Resurgence by Charles Sheffield (Baen); Michael Whelan for Sorcery Rising by Jude Fisher (DAW)
2004	Donato Giancola for City by Clifford D. Simak (SFBC, 2003)	David Bowers for Paladin of Souls by Lois McMaster Bujold (Eos, October 2003); Kinuko Y. Craft for Wolfskin by Juliet Marillier (Tor Books, June 2003); Todd Lockwood for Transitions: The Artwork of Todd Lockwood (Collin & Brown, May 2003); Don Maitz for The Fairy Rebel by Lynne Reid Banks (Delacort, May 2003); Stephen Youll for Lord of Snow and Shadows by Sarah Ash (Bantam Spectra, July 2003)
2005 (tie)	Rick Berry for Queen of the Amazons by Judith Tarr (Tor Books, March 2004); Tony DiTerlizzi for The Wrath of Mulgarath: The Spiderwick Chronicles Book 5 by Holly Black & Tony DiTerlizzi (Simon & Schuster, September 2004); Donato Giancola for The Nameless Day by Sara Douglas (Tor Books, July 2004)	Todd Lockwood for Glass Dragons by Sean McMullen (Tor Books, March 2004); Ruth Sanderson for The Snow Princess by Ruth Sanderson (Little Brown, October 2004); Stephen Youll for The Dragon's Son by Margaret Weis (Tor Books, July 2004)
2006	Stephan Martinière for Elantris by Brandon Sanderson (Tor Books, May 2005)	Kinuko Y. Craft for The Divided Crown by Isabel Glass (Tor); Daniel Dos Santos for The Duke's Ballad by Andre Norton (Tor); J. P. Targete for The Fair Folk edited by Marvin Kaye (SFBC); Bob Eggleton for The House of Cthulhu by Brian Lumley (Tor); Jon Foster for Midshipwizard Halcyon Blithe by James M. Wood (Tor); Charles Vess for Singer of Souls by Adam Stemple (Tor)
2007	Stephan Martinière for River of Gods by Ian McDonald (Pyr, Mar 2006)	Jon Foster for The Demon and the City by Liz Williams (Night Shade Books, Aug 2006); Donato Giancola for The Thirteenth House by Sharon Shinn (Ace, Mar 2006); Todd Lockwood for Temeraire: In the Service of the King by Naomi Novik (SFBC, 2006); James A. Owen for Here, There Be Dragons (Chronicles of the Imaginarium Geographica, Book One) by James A. Owen (Simon & Schuster, September 2006)
2008	Donato Giancola for The Outback Stars by Sandra McDonald (Tor Books, April 2007)	Alan M. Clark for Shades by Geoff Cooper and Brian Keene (Cemetery Dance, November 2007); Dan Dos Santos for Farseed by Pamela Sargent (Tor Books, March 2007); Bob Eggleton for Dagon in The Taint and Other Novellas by Brian Lumley (Subterranean Press, November 2007); Jon Foster for The Well of Ascension by Brandon Sanderson (Tor Books, August 2007); Stephen Hickman for The Lifehouse Trilogy by Spider Robinson (Baen, December 2007); Vance Kovacs for Seeing Redd by Frank Beddor (Dial Penguin, August 2007); Todd Lockwood for The Orc King by R.A. Salvatore (Wizards of the Coast, September 2007); Stephan Martinière for Mainspring by Jay Lake (Tor Books, October 2007); John Jude Palencar for Fatal Revenant by Stephen R. Donaldson (Putnam, October 2007); John Picacio for The Margarets by Sheri S. Tepper (Eos, May 2007)
2009	Donato Giancola for A Book of Wizards edited by Marvin Kaye (SFBC, April 2008)	Stephan Martinière for The Dragons of Babel by Michael Swanwick (Tor); Scott Fischer for An Evil Guest by Gene Wolfe (Tor); Stephen Hickman for Ghost Quartet edited by Marvin Kaye (Tor); Todd Lockwood for Quofum by Alan Dean Foster (Del Rey); Dan Dos Santos for Stalking the Vampire by Mike Resnick (Pyr); John Picacio for Viewpoints Critical: Selected Stories by L. E. Modesitt, Jr. (Tor)
2010	Matthew Stewart for The Valley of Shadows by Brian Cullen (Tor, Feb. 2009)	
2011	Michael Whelan for The Way of Kings by Brandon Sanderson (Tor, August 2010)	Kinuko Y. Craft for Midsummer Night by Freda Warrington (Tor, November 2010); Don Maitz for Blasphemy by Mike Resnick (Golden Gryphon Press, August 2010); Gregory Manchess for Spectrum 17 edited by Cathy Fenner and Arnie Fenner (Underwood Books, November 2010); John Picacio for The Waters Rising by Sheri S. Tepper (Harper Voyager, August 2010)
2012	Tom Kidd for Deathbird Stories by Harlan Ellison (Subterranean)	Stephan Martinière for Prospero Regained by L. Jagi Lamplighter (Tor); Lee Moyer for Two Worlds and In Between: The Best of Caitlín R. Kieran (Subterranean); Cliff Nielsen for The Tempering of Men by Sarah Monette and Elizabeth Bear (Tor); Greg Staples for The Horror Stories of Robert E. Howard (Subterranean)
2013	Todd Lockwood for The Wild Road by Jennifer Roberson (DAW, September 2012)	J.K. Drummond for Deadhouse Gates by Steven Erikson (Subterranean Press, March 2012); Bob Eggleton for Gods of Opar by Philip José Farmer & Christopher Paul Carey (Subterranean Press, June 2012); Donato Giancola for Range of Ghosts by Elizabeth Bear (Tor, March 2012); John Picacio for Hyperion by Dan Simmons (Subterranean Press, April 2012); Sam Weber for Quantum Coin by E. C. Myers (Pyr, October 2012)
2014	Todd Lockwood for A Natural History of Dragons: A Memoir by Lady Trent by Marie Brennan (Titan Books, February 2013)	
2015	Julie Dillon for Shadows Beneath: The Writing Excuses Anthologyedited by Peter Ahlstrom (Dragonsteel Entertainment, July 2014)	
2016	Todd Lockwood; Voyage of the Basilisk: A Memoir by Lady Trent by Marie Brennan (Titan Books, March 2015)	Sam Weber for Dune by Frank Herbert (The Folio Society, 2015); Lius Lasahido for Hannu Rajaniemi: Collected Fiction by Hannu Rajaniemi (Tachyon Publications, May 2015); Cynthia Sheppard for Karen Memory by Elizabeth Bear (Tor Books, February 2015); Richard Anderson for The Dinosaur Lords by Victor Milán (Tor Books, July 2015)
2017	Tran Nguyen; Kushiel's Dart by Jacqueline Carey (Subterranean, 2016)	
2018	Marc Simonetti; The Sword of Shannara by Terry Brooks (Grim Oak Press, August 2017)	
2019	Jon Foster; I Met a Traveller in an Antique Land by Connie Willis (Subterranean, April 2018)	
2020	Eric Wilkerson; Tristan Strong Punches a Hole in the Sky by Kwame Mbalia (Rick Riordan Presents, October 2019)	
2021	Corinne Reid; Encounters with the Imaginary Vol. 3 edited by Jeszika Le Vye and Kira Night (Boneshaker Press, September 2020)	Tommy Arnold for Harrow the Ninth by Tamsyn Muir (Tor Books, August 2020); Iris Compiet for The Dark Crystal Bestiary: The Definitive Guide to the Creatures of Thra by Adam Cesare (Insight Editions Illustrated edition, October 2020); Jason Mowry for Red Dragon by Thomas Harris (Suntup Editions, Fall 2020); John Picacio for Black Sun by Rebecca Roanhorse (Gallery / Saga Press, October 2020)
2022		
2023	Manzi Jackson based on the photography of CreativeSoul; Africa Risen edited by Sheree Renee Thomas, Oghenechovwe Donald Ekpeki, & Zelda Knight (Tor; November 2022)	Marcela Bolívar for Blackwater by Michael McDowell (Suntup Editions; Spring 2022); Donato Giancola for The Dragonborne Chair by Tad Williams (Grim Oak Press; April 2022); Tran Nguyen for The Dragon’s Promise by Elizabeth Lim (Knopf Books for Young Readers; August 2022); John Picacio for Fevered Star by Rebecca Roanhorse (Simon & Schuster / Saga Press; April 2022); Omar Rayyan for Animal Farm by George Orwell (Suntup Editions; December 2022)
