= Gideon the Ninth =

2019 science fantasy novel by Tamsyn Muir

- Cover art
- Author: Tamsyn Muir
- Audio read by: Moira Quirk
- Cover artist: Tommy Arnold
- Language: English
- Series: The Locked Tomb #1
- Genre: Science fantasy, pop culture fiction
- Publisher: Tor Books
- Publication date: 10 September 2019
- Publication place: New Zealand
- Media type: Print (hardcover) ebook Audiobook
- Pages: 448
- ISBN: 978-1250313195
- Followed by: Harrow the Ninth

Gideon the Ninth is a 2019 science fantasy novel by the New Zealand writer Tamsyn Muir. It is Muir's debut novel and the first in her The Locked Tomb series, followed by Harrow the Ninth (2020), Nona the Ninth (2022), and the upcoming Alecto the Ninth.

== Setting ==
In the star system Dominicus, there are nine planets, each home to a great House which practices its own school of necromancy. The Houses in turn are ruled by the Emperor, an impossibly powerful, immortal necromancer whom they have worshipped as God for the past ten thousand years. At the start of Gideon the Ninth, the Emperor invites the heirs of the Nine Houses and their sword-wielding bodyguards (called cavaliers) to undergo a series of trials to become Lyctors. Lyctors are immortal necromancers, revered as saints, who serve as the Emperor's right-hand necromancers in wars against his enemies.

== Plot ==
The narrative begins with eighteen year-old Gideon Nav's 87th attempt to escape the Ninth House, a death cult tasked with guarding a Locked Tomb said to contain the Emperor's greatest foe and by whom Gideon was raised in indentured servitude. Her plans of fleeing to join the Emperor's armies (called the Cohort) are quickly foiled by her lifelong antagonist and heiress of the Ninth House, Harrowhark "Harrow" Nonagesimus.

Despite their clashing personalities and mutual hatred of each other, Gideon is Harrow's only real choice of cavalier, primarily due to a purported atmospheric contamination incident around the time of their births that killed the rest of the Ninth House's children. Harrow offers Gideon a commission in the Cohort if she serves as cavalier during the Emperor's trials.

Harrow and Gideon travel to Canaan House, a decaying mansion on the planet of the First House, where they meet the heirs and cavaliers of the other Houses. The group is tasked with exploring the mansion to discover the secrets of Lyctorhood.

Harrow initially treats Gideon as a liability and disappears for long periods of time to work on her own, leaving Gideon to wander Canaan House and interact with the other Houses. After one such prolonged absence, Gideon goes looking for her and, with the help of the Sixth House, finds her in a hidden basement containing a plethora of necromantic experiments left by the Emperor and his original group of Lyctors. It becomes apparent that each House's necromancer and cavalier must work together to complete the puzzles in the basement, so Harrow and Gideon begrudgingly ally. They make quick progress in the trial due to Harrow's exceptional skill in necromancy and Gideon's perceptiveness and combat skills.

Following a series of suspicious deaths, the Houses assume that one or more of them are hunting the others. It becomes clear that Canaan House is designed to prevent any one of the Nine Houses from succeeding without collaborating with or combating each other. The surviving Houses turn to bribery, blackmail, and unsteady alliances.

Gideon and Harrow's own relationship reaches a low point over Gideon's infatuation with the terminally ill heiress of the Seventh House, Dulcinea Septimus; tensions run high after Gideon discovers the severed head of the Seventh House cavalier among Harrow's things. Gideon takes her suspicions (and the head) to the Sixth House, who in turn confront Dulcinea. Dulcinea explains that the Emperor's call had "caught out" her House; lacking options, she had been using necromancy to move her cavalier's body about like a puppet since before their arrival at Canaan House.

Harrow and Gideon reconcile. Harrow reveals that the atmospheric contamination incident was an intentional human sacrifice by her family in order to create a necromancer powerful enough to save the Ninth House from economic and political failure: herself. (An infant Gideon somehow survived the sacrifice, leading Harrow's parents and the rest of the Ninth House to treat her coldly out of fear.) Harrow is haunted by the hundreds of innocent deaths involved in her creation. Her guilt led her to breach the Locked Tomb as a young girl, where she fell in love with the immaculate corpse of the beautiful girl entombed within. Harrow's family died by suicide upon Gideon telling them about her heretical trespass; Harrow has been burdened with secretly leading the Ninth House for years. Gideon and Harrow apologise for their treatment of each other. Harrow acknowledges Gideon as her friend, and they pledge a new alliance: "One flesh, one end."

The Sixth and the Ninth houses investigate one of the studies in Canaan House. At the same time, the Second House attempts to call the Cohort for backup and intervention, but the Second necromancer is mortally wounded and her cavalier killed by the priests of the First House in the attempt. Meanwhile, the Third House's heiress, Ianthe Tridentarius, deduces how Lyctors are created: a necromancer must extract and devour their cavalier's soul, allowing them to use the soul as a virtually infinite power source and gaining the cavalier's combat skills. Ianthe kills her cavalier without hesitation and becomes a Lyctor, much to the horror of the other Houses. The Eighth House attempts to bring her to justice for the murder of her cavalier, but they are killed when Colum the Eighth is possessed by an angry ghost, who in turn kills his necromancer.

After a brief confrontation with Palamedes the Sixth, the Seventh House heiress reveals herself to be an imposter: not Dulcinea the Seventh, but instead Cytherea the First, one of the Emperor's Lyctors. Cytherea explains that she killed the real Dulcinea and her cavalier shortly before arriving at Canaan House and assumed her identity; likewise, she was the one who killed the Fourth and Fifth Houses, in the hopes that doing so would lure the Emperor back to Canaan House. She intends to "kill [him] and burn his Houses" as part of a revenge plot, starting with the remaining heirs and cavaliers.

The survivors battle throughout the House, but Cytherea is apparently invincible. Just as Harrow is about to be killed, Gideon intervenes, ending her own life to force Harrow to become a Lyctor. Harrow kills Cytherea before falling unconscious.

Harrow wakes up on the Emperor's flagship; she and a wounded Ianthe are the only confirmed survivors of Canaan House. She begs the Emperor to resurrect Gideon, only to learn that Gideon's soul is irreversibly merged with hers. The Emperor reveals that the Empire is in decline and most of the Lyctors have fallen in battle or gone insane. He promises to restore the Ninth House to glory, and in exchange Harrow agrees to serve the Emperor as Harrowhark the First.

== Style ==
Gideon the Ninth is notable for its writing, which mixes gothic horror with contemporary humor. Muir acknowledges that her writing "includes useless memes and jokes for the reader that nobody in my universe would get." In her review for Vox, Constance Grady commended Muir's ability to slide her "voice seamlessly from Lovecraftian gothic mode into a slangy contemporary mode without ever undercutting one or the other for cheap comedy." Adam Rowe in Forbes also commented on Muir's incorporation of "2019 language tics." In Rowe's interview with Muir, Muir said that the "irreverent tone" was intended "to balance out the horror aspect and some of the heavier, more Gormenghastian stylings." Jason Sheehan's NPR review said of the novel's genre: "Gideon the Ninth is too funny to be horror, too gooey to be science fiction, has too many spaceships and autodoors to be fantasy, and has far more bloody dismemberings than your average parlor romance."

Muir consulted with writer, HEMA martial artist, and fencer Lissa Harris on realistic depictions of swordfighting and combat. The collaboration is reflected in Gideon's journey retraining from a soldier's longsword to a duelist's rapier; Harris herself transitioned from fencing to the longsword. Harris said that Gideon is a "fiendishly talented fighter who is forced to use new and unfamiliar tools, and has to sacrifice some measure of subtlety in favour of crude effectiveness."

== Reception ==
Gideon the Ninth has received endorsements from authors V. E. Schwab, Charles Stross, Robin Sloan, Warren Ellis, Martha Wells, Amal El-Mohtar, Kiersten White, Annalee Newitz, Genevieve Cogman, Kameron Hurley, Django Wexler, Yoon Ha Lee, Rebecca Roanhorse, Richard Kadrey, Rin Chupeco, Max Gladstone, and Brooke Bolander.

Writing in The New York Times, Amal El-Mohtar called Gideon the Ninth a "devastating debut that deserves every ounce of hype it’s received" and praised it as "deft, tense and atmospheric, compellingly immersive and wildly original."

Liz Bourke and Carolyn Cushman gave a more critical review in Locus, saying that the novel failed "in its interrogation of the central hate-co-dependence-need relationship between Gideon and Harrow."

Year	Award	Category	Result	Ref
2019	Amazon Best of 2019	SF & Fantasy	Won	
2019	Audible Best of 2019	Fantasy	Finalist	
2019	Book Riot Best Books of 2019	—	Listed	
2019	Nebula Award	Novel	Finalist	
2019	New York Public Library Best Books of 2019	—	Listed	
2019	NPR Best Books of the Year	—	Listed	
2019	Paste 19 Best Novels of 2019	—	Listed	
2019	Polygon Best SF & Fantasy Books of 2019	—	Listed	
2019	Shelf Awareness Best Books of 2019	—	Listed	
2019	Vox Best Books of the Year	—	Listed	
2020	British Fantasy Award	Best Newcomer	Shortlisted	
2020	Chesley Award	Best Hardcover Illustration	Finalist	
2020	Crawford Award	—	Won	
2020	Dragon Award	Science Fiction Novel	Nominated	
2020	Hugo Award	Novel	Finalist	
2020	Locus Award	First Novel	Won	
2020	RUSA CODES Reading List	Science Fiction	Shortlisted	
2020	World Fantasy Award	Novel	Finalist	
2022	Premio Ignotus	Foreign Novel	Won	
