= Nona the Ninth =

2022 science fantasy novel by Tamsyn Muir

- First edition
- Author: Tamsyn Muir
- Audio read by: Moira Quirk
- Cover artist: Tommy Arnold
- Language: English
- Series: The Locked Tomb #3
- Genre: Science fantasy
- Publisher: Tor Books
- Publication date: 13 September 2022
- Publication place: New Zealand
- Media type: Print (hardcover) ebook Audiobook
- Pages: 480
- ISBN: 978-1250854117
- Preceded by: Harrow the Ninth
- Followed by: Alecto the Ninth

Nona the Ninth is a 2022 science fantasy novel by the New Zealand writer Tamsyn Muir. It is the third book in her The Locked Tomb series, after Gideon the Ninth (2019) and Harrow the Ninth (2020), with Alecto the Ninth to follow.

The novel won the 2023 Premio Ignotus for Best Foreign Novel. It was a finalist for the 2022 Nebula Award for Best Novel, 2023 Hugo Award for Best Novel and 2023 Locus Award for Best Science Fiction Novel.

== Plot ==
Nona, housed in the body of Harrowhark, awakens on an unknown planet. Harrow, along with the cavalier Pyrrha in the Lyctor Gideon's body, was rescued by Camilla and Palamedes (who now share a body) from the River at the end of Harrow the Ninth. Camilla and Palamedes are unable to determine Nona's true identity but believe she is either Gideon or Harrow. Nona displays several magical abilities, including healing faster than a Lyctor and intuitively understanding any language (including body language).

Nona works as a teacher's assistant at a school where she befriends local kids. She, Camilla, Palamedes, Pyrrha, and Coronabeth Tridentarius (now called "Crown") are together working as a cell of the Blood of Eden (BoE) rebel group. The cell reports to We Suffer, who controls a BoE faction seeking to negotiate with the Nine Houses, with the secret objective of gathering the necessary materials to open the Locked Tomb. We Suffer's faction is in conflict with the militant, anti-negotiation "Merv Wing," commanded by Unjust Hope, which publicly immolates anyone suspected of being necromantic.

The Empire's military branch has largely abandoned the planet following the arrival of Resurrection Beast Number 7, Varun. Varun is "periscoping"—it is projecting a spirit-image of itself as a prelude to full materialization. This drives any necromancer insane, except for those protected by being in non-necromantic bodies. For this reason, Judith Deuteros, Heir to the Second House and a BoE captive, is an incoherent vessel for Varun to speak through. Only Nona can understand its screams, and it seems to know her, calling her a "green thing."

Ianthe Tridentarius arrives onworld looking for the Sixth House, which has deserted from the Nine Houses following the testimony of its leader (Palamedes) and instructions left by its Lyctor (Cassiopeia). Ianthe pilots the dead body of her cavalier Naberius to avoid being driven mad by Varun, and demands all House citizens turn themselves in. Crown goes to meet her, pretending to be seeking asylum for Judith, while Pyrrha also appears in the guise of the Lyctor Gideon. Having seen the inside of the barracks, Pyrrha is able to provide BoE key intel via a bug hidden on Judith, using coded words previously arranged with the others.

Camilla and Palamedes arrive at the barracks with Nona pretending to be Harrow. Manipulating Ianthe in order to touch her, Palamedes takes control of Naberius' body. The groups proceeds to find Gideon Nav's body, who initially pretends to be dead, only to reveal that her soul, or part of it (or a version of it) is in fact animating the now-invulnerable corpse. She calls herself Prince Kiriona, Heir to the Nine Houses.

Varun begins to materialize and its insectoid herald warriors fall to the planet's surface. After talking through Judith with Nona atop of a truck, Varun agrees to pull back. Unfortunately, many of its heralds have already arrived. We Suffer's faction takes cover underground, where they find and capture Merv Wing's convoy transporting the Sixth House hostages.

With everyone of import now assembled, they intend to complete the mission of opening the Locked Tomb. This requires travel through the River, something only a powerful Lyctor can achieve. Camilla and Palamedes therefore merge their souls in an advanced form of Lyctorhood, and are able to move a megatruck into the River. Here they find no ravenous ghosts, but instead a mysterious tower.

Nona helps them pilot to the Ninth House. She feels that she is dying; she states she does not have the right soul for the body that she's in, and so is coming untethered and losing her ability to control Harrow's body. She is increasingly aware of other thoughts in her mind: either the residual souls of Harrow and Gideon (the body's previous owners), or the thoughts of Nona's true self who can "remember."

They find that the Ninth House is under attack from unknown entities called devils, the same possessive force that killed Colum in the first book. Ianthe attempts to block their way to the tomb, but she is bested thanks to Gideon's triple cross and Pyrrha's herald bullet. Gideon claims that God wants the tomb open, but the truth of the matter is unclear.

Entering the tomb, Nona remembers having done this before, proving after many increasingly clear hints that she is none other than Alecto, the body in the tomb. Alecto entered Harrow's body when Harrow was ten, when she opened the tomb and kissed the body, providing a conduit for possession. This is why Harrow had visions of the body; Alecto was possessing her the whole time. Alecto finally took control, manifesting as Nona, after Gideon and Harrow's souls were removed at the end of the preceding novel. At that time, Gideon was possibly removed by God, and Harrow intentionally placed her own soul in the Locked Tomb in Alecto's sleeping body.

These events are interspersed with dreamlike memories in which John Gaius reveals the secrets behind the destruction of Earth and his ascent to divinity: he destroyed the already dying Earth, consumed much of her soul to become God, and stuffed the rest of the Earth into a body inspired by his favourite Barbie. Each of these chapters is titled with a reference to a verse from John's Gospel.

Now Nona reunites with Alecto's body, and the souls are switched to their correct places. Alecto returns to her body, waking it, and Harrow returns to hers. Harrow declares her love for Alecto, only for Alecto to swear service to Harrow as the descendent of Anastasia (founder of the Ninth House, to whom Alecto swore a sacred oath). Alecto then proceeds to travel through the River to John Gaius, whom she then stabs through the chest.

== Publishing history ==
Muir had originally planned for her The Locked Tomb series to be a trilogy, with Alecto the Ninth following Harrow the Ninth and being the third and final book in the series. However, in July 2021, Tor Publishing announced that the trilogy would be a series instead, with Nona the Ninth becoming the third book in the series and Alecto the Ninth becoming the fourth.

In an interview with Vox, Muir stated that Nona the Ninth "sprang from the planned first act of Alecto," and was spun off into its own book after her editor realised the first act of Alecto the Ninth alone had a word count of 140,000 words. Muir further added in the interview that, while she was writing Nona the Ninth, she had additionally written 30,000 words of an alternate timeline of the series "to make sure that if you wound up Gideon and Harrow and put them on a slightly different route the laws of the universe would still flow accordingly." The book cover was designed by Tommy Arnold, who had designed the previous books' covers.

== Themes ==
In an interview with In the Margin, Muir stated that the series included her "personal relationship to faith." She elaborated that "the God of the Locked Tomb IS a man; he IS the Father and the Teacher; it's an inherently masc role played by someone who has an uneasy relationship himself to playing a Biblical patriarch," but that Nona the Ninth would show how "the divine in the Locked Tomb is essentially feminine on multiple axes.". Muir has also stated that

Gender is kind of a weird buffet in the Locked Tomb universe as it is. Pronouns often exist independent of gender identities—there's one character in particular who lives with bestowed pronouns and who is violently proud of them while at the same time quite likes experiencing what other pronouns mean. Titles are important for different people for different reasons. The choices people have made—or haven't made—as to what their names are, what they're called, are meant to be significant.

== Reception ==
Nona the Ninth was a New York Times Best Seller and was generally well-received by critics.

Publishers Weekly called the book "characteristically brilliant," adding that "Nona's lovely, simple, and occasionally silly voice" created a "riveting contrast" with the "dark, dense backdrop of the series so far."

Lacy Baugher Milas, for Paste, commented that compared to the focus on grief and tragedy in the previous The Locked Tomb books, "Nona the Ninth feels like something altogether different: A story about life, and maybe even a little bit about hope". She wrote that the book "expects us to do a fair amount of reading between the lines ourselves and offers up no easy answers". Baugher Milas called Muir's "immediate hook" of main character amnesia for the second book "in a row" a "gutsy move" – she highlighted that "Nona's story could not be more opposite to the 500-plus-page meditation on grief that was Harrow the Ninth. [...] Farewell Nona, we barely knew you. But what a lovely time we had together".

Constance Grady, for Vox, wrote that "Nona the Ninth is a deceptive book: Its sweetness hides teeth, and then its teeth hide more sweetness. As long as you go in without expecting fancy things like being able to understand every detail of the action in a literal and straightforward way, it will treat you right". Grady also highlighted some "notable vibes" such as "dogs being good [...], the best cool girl gang leader [...], necromantic battles [...], nuclear war" and "more Catholicism than you might expect!"

Linda Codega, for Gizmodo, called the book an "intermission" in Muir's The Locked Tomb series. Codega wrote that "Nona the Ninth is an exercise in over-developing what should have been a single arc into a novel-length aside. [...] This book does include some great lyrical turns of phrase and running jokes. [...] It talks about grief, death, sacrifice, and depression with an expansiveness that is incredible and unmatched. But for all these benefits, Nona has none of their grace". They commented that the structure of the book means that some of the audience will "love it", however, "some people, like me, are going to slog through it, hoping that there's some kind of payoff at the 300-page mark". Codega felt that this "payoff never happened" and that while the book is receiving "a lot of hype from die-hard fans", Nona the Ninth "is a book that would make me tell fans not to bother".

=== Year-end lists, honors, and awards ===
Year	Award	Category	Result	Ref
2022	Audible Best of 2022	Science Fiction	Listed	
2022	Kirkus Reviews Best of 2022	SF & Fantasy	Listed	
2022	Nebula Award	Novel	Nominated	
2023	Hugo Award	Novel	Finalist	
2023	Locus Award	Fantasy Novel	Finalist	
2023	Premio Ignotus	Foreign Novel	Won	
