= Jubilate Agno =

Poem by Christopher Smart, 1759–1763

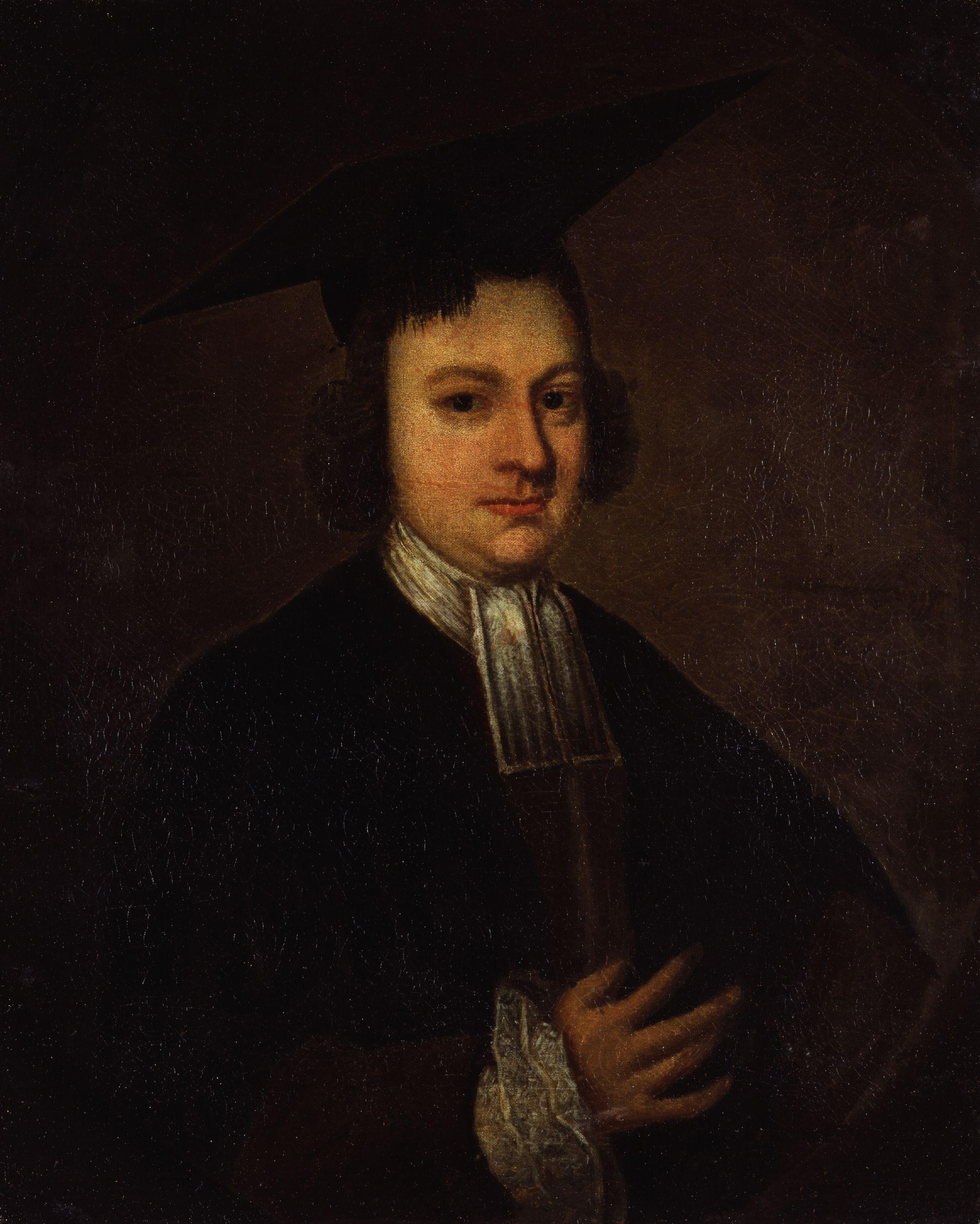
Portrait of Smart, c. 1745

Jubilate Agno (Latin: "Rejoice in the Lamb") is a religious poem by Christopher Smart, and was written between 1759 and 1763, during Smart's confinement for insanity in St. Luke's Hospital, Bethnal Green, London. The poem was first published in 1939 under the title Rejoice in the Lamb: A Song from Bedlam, and edited by W. F. Stead from Smart's manuscript, which Stead had discovered in a private library.

== Background ==
A "Commission of Lunacy" was taken out against Christopher Smart, and he was admitted in St. Luke's Hospital on 6 May 1757 as a "Curable Patient" by his wife Anna's stepfather John Newbery. It is possible that Smart was confined by Newbery over old debts and a poor relationship between the two. Regardless, there is evidence that an incident took place in St. James's Park in which he "routed all the company" (Jubilate Agno B89) and this incident may have provoked his being locked away.

During this time, Smart was left alone, except for his cat Jeoffry and the occasional gawker. It is very possible that he felt "homeless" during this time and surely felt that he was in a "limbo… between public and private space". He had nothing else but to turn inwards and devote himself to God and his poetry. No specifics are known about Christopher Smart's day-to-day activities, and he was released from the asylum on 30 January 1763, but his poem was not to be published until 1939.

== The manuscript ==
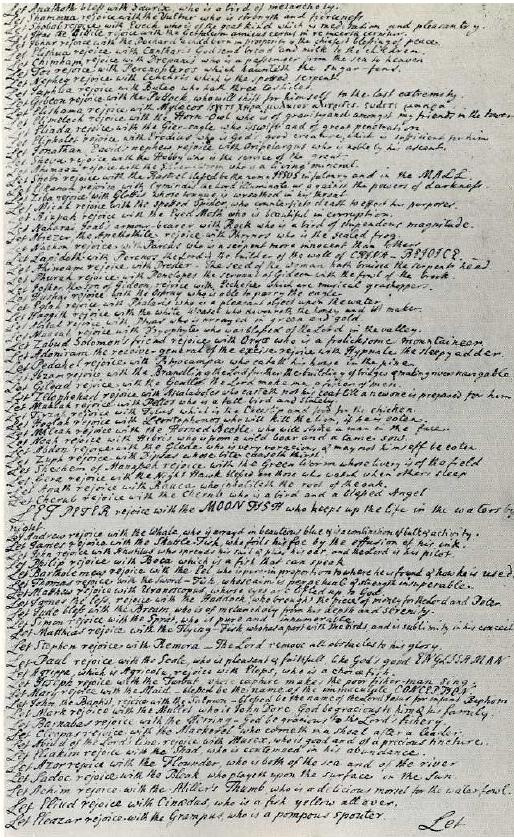
"Let" side of the manuscript

Jubilate Agno is divided into four fragments labeled "A", "B", "C", and "D". The whole work consists of over 1,200 lines: all the lines in some sections begin with the word Let; those in other sections begin with For. Those in the series beginning with the word "Let", associated names of human beings, mainly biblical, with various natural objects; and those beginning with the word "For" are a series of aphoristic verses.

Editing the work in 1950, W. H. Bond stated that, "The poem was intended as a responsive reading; and that is why the Let and For sections [of the manuscript] are physically distinct while corresponding verse for verse. Smart's plan was to arrange the Let and For passages opposite one another antiphonally, following a practice of biblical Hebrew poetry, and that the present MS. represents less than half of Smart's original plan for the poem."

Although the original manuscript divided the "Let" and "For" verses onto opposing sides of the manuscript, Karina Williamson says that "Dr W. H. Bond then discovered that some of the LET and FOR folios were numbered and dated concurrently, and that these chronologically parallel texts were further connected by verbal links." Reinforcing this view of a parallel between the two sides is the fact that Smart's influence Robert Lowth, and his Lectures on the Sacred Poetry of the Hebrews, spends a large portion of his work exploring the "parallelism" found in "Hebrew verse". In Williamson's 1980 edition, she made an editorial decision and combined the "Let" and the "For" and then justified this combining the two sides to follow each other based on Bond's thinking.

Using Williamson's combining of the two halves as a model, Guest argues that the "For" verses explore religion with a "personal tone" and the "Let" are "unambiguous" and deal with public matters. Jeanne Walker goes further than Guest and reinforces Bond's argument that the "Let " and "For" sections are reminiscent of the Hebrew tradition when she states that the purpose of the poems, as with the Hebrew poems, is to "iterate both present and future simultaneously, that is, they redeem time."

In Jubilate Agno, Smart describes his writing as creating "impressions". To accomplish this task, he incorporated puns and onomatopoeia in order to emphasize the theological significance of his poetic language. Jubilate Agno reflects an abandonment of traditional poetic structures in order to explore complex religious thought. His "Let" verses join creation together as he seemingly writes his own version of Biblical poetry. Smart, in Jubilate Agno, plays on words and the meaning behind words in order to participate with the divine that exists within language. This is most exemplified when the poet says, "For I pray the Lord Jesus to translate my MAGNIFICAT into verse and represent it" (B43), where the image of the Magnificat connects Smart to Mary and her praise of God before giving birth to Jesus, the future saviour.

=== Ark ===
"Fragment A" of Jubilate Agno begins by combining the Patriarchs with animals. The beginning lines of the poem state the function of this action when they read, "Let Noah and his company approach the throne of Grace, and do homage to the Ark of their Salvation" (A4). These two groups are combined in order to combine the images of "Noah's Ark" and the "Ark of Salvation" in a manner that is similar to a "baptismal service".

For many of the pairs there is a logical or symbolic consistency. Figures, such as Abraham, Balaam, and Daniel are paired with animals mentioned directly in relationship with each other in their Biblical accounts, while others, like Isaac, are slightly more obscure and paired with animals that were involved in an important aspect of their life. Biblical priests follow the Patriarchs, and their animal companions are the unclean animals from Deuteronomy.

The pairing slowly breaks down when later figures, such as political leaders, enter into the poem. Along with this transformation of pairing come insects, legendary creatures, and finally seven birds at the end of the fragment. The next section, "Fragment B" returns to the various animal pairs and, in a mixture of Old and New Testament figures, begins to rely on local animals or animals that pun off aspects of the figure's life. One such example is a pun on Salmon and Salome as a pair for John the Baptist. This fish image is further expanded to play off the idea that the Apostles were originally "fishermen" along with being "fishers of men". These pairs continue until the poem turns to creatures from Pliny at B245.

The pairing stops at B295 when the "For" verses become the only type remaining in the fragment. However, the pairing is resumed in "Fragment C" when Biblical names from the Book of Ezra and the Book of Nehemiah are combined with various plants and herbs. The last section, "Fragment D", relies on personal friends and those known by Smart to be paired with various stones, gems, minerals and a few herbs.

=== Science ===
The poem contains many references to the scientific works of John Locke and Isaac Newton. However, some have claimed that Smart was uninvolved with science and did not care about scientific principles since, for example, he relies on mythical creatures such as the "Leucrocuta" that come from pagan pseudo-scientific works like those of Pliny the Elder. Moreover, Jubilate Agno criticizes contemporary scientific theories, saying "Newton is ignorant for if a man consult not the WORD how should he understand the WORK?"(B220), and establishes Smart's own original natural philosophy, in which he emphasizes God's presence in the universe.

Smart seems to be fascinated by contemporary science, but he also aims to incorporate it into a theology, and in so doing to create what has been called a "new science". This "new science" that Smart seems to express in his poetry rewrites Newton's laws of motion to include the divine (B159–B168):

For the grosser the particles the nearer to the sink, and the nearer to purity, the quicker the gravitation.
For MATTER is the dust of the Earth, every atom of which is the life.
For MOTION is the quality of life direct, and that which hath not motion, is resistance.
For Resistance is not of GOD, but he-hath built his works upon it.
For the Centripetal and Centrifugal forces are GOD SUSTAINING and DIRECTING.
For Elasticity is the temper of matter to recover its place with vehemence.
For Attraction is the earning of parts, which have a similitude in the life.
For the Life of God is in the Loadstone, and there is a magnet, which pointeth due EAST.
For the Glory of God is always in the East, but cannot be seen for the cloud of the crucifixion.
For due East is the way to Paradise, which man knoweth not by reason of his fall.

The problem with Newtonian physics according to Smart, Harriet Guest argues, is that "it is not based on the principles of revelation: it builds up general notions or theories from analyses of particular instances, rather than attempting to understand each instance through perceiving its relation to the whole revealed to faith." It is possible that Smart was influenced by John Hutchinson, Moses Principia being his major work on the subject, and it is Hutchinson that inspired Smart to adjust or alter Newtonian science in this way, as it was (in his view) lacking a proper relationship with the divine. However, the poem's "new science" seems also to come to an abrupt stop at the end, "as though [Smart] loses interest in it for a while."

=== Jeoffry ===
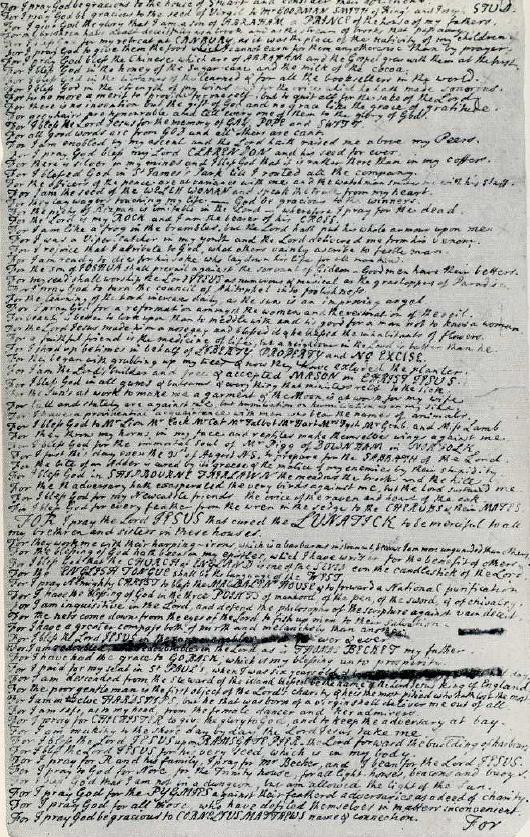
"For" side of the manuscript

The poem is chiefly remembered today – especially among cat lovers – for the 74-line section wherein Smart extols the many virtues and habits of his cat, Jeoffry. To this Neil Curry remarks, "They are lines that most people first meet outside the context of the poem as a whole, as they are probably the most anthologized 'extract' in our literature." Furthermore, Jeoffry himself is the "most famous cat in the whole history of English literature."

Smart is fond of his cat and praises his cat's relationship with God when he says (B695–B768):

"For I will consider my Cat Jeoffry.
For he is the servant of the Living God duly and daily serving him.
For at the first glance of the glory of God in the East he worships in his Way.
For this is done by wreathing his body seven times round with elegant quickness.
For then he leaps up to catch the musk, which is the blessing of God upon his prayer
...

For when his day's work is done his business more properly begins.
For he keeps the Lord's watch in the night against the adversary.
For he counteracts the Devil, who is death, by brisking about the life
For in his morning orisons he loves the sun and the sun loves him
For he is of the Tribe of Tiger
For the Cherub Cat is a term of the Angel Tiger
For he has the subtlety and hissing of a serpent, which in goodness he suppresses.
...

For he is the cleanest in the use of his forepaws of any quadruped.
For the dexterity of his defence is an instance of the love of God to him exceedingly.
For he is the quickest to his mark of any creature.
For he is tenacious of his point.
For he is a mixture of gravity and waggery.
For he knows that God is his Saviour.
For there is nothing sweeter than his peace when at rest.
For there is nothing brisker than his life when in motion
...

For God has blessed him in the variety of his movements.
For, tho he cannot fly, he is an excellent clamberer.
For his motions upon the face of the earth are more than any other quadrupede.
For he can tread to all the measures upon the musick
For he can swim for life.
For he can creep."

His section of Jeoffry is just part of his larger desire to give a "voice" to nature, and Smart believes that nature, like his cat, is always praising God but needs a poet in order to bring out that voice. The themes of animals and language are thus merged in Jubilate Agno, and Jeoffry is transformed into a manifestation of the Ars Poetica tradition.

== Critical interpretation ==
Many critics have focused on the unique language of Jubilate Agno. Smart's constant emphasis on the force of poetry in the poem takes on the qualities of the Ars Poetica tradition. As such, Smart is attempting to develop a poetic language that will connect him to the "one true, eternal poem" of God. This poetic language connects Smart to Orpheus and David, but also relates him to Adam's "onomathetic" tradition, or the idea that names hold significant weight in the universe and that Adam was able to join in with creation by naming objects.

Two critics have focused on possible sexual imagery in Jubilate Agno, particularly in its references to horns, which have been read as sexual images. Easton interprets the horn as a phallic image and identifies masculine and feminine horns throughout the poem. Hawes develops this reading, arguing that the poem shows "that [Smart] had been ‘feminized’ as a cuckold", and that it predicts a misogynistic future while undermining that vision through its repeated associations with female creation. During Smart's confinement, however, his wife Anna Maria had moved to Dublin to work as an agent for her stepfather, the publisher John Newbery. Smart's own treatment of the horn in Fragment C is explicitly religious: he describes a "glorious horn" worn by men "in the day of David", which "brightened to the Glory of God", and identifies Christ's horn as "the horn of Salvation". Where the poem does acknowledge mockery, lamenting that "they have turned the horn into scoff and derision", the taunt reflects the period's common use of horns as a general insult to a man's standing, which did not depend on actual infidelity.

== Jubilate Agno in music ==
The text of Jubilate Agno is the source for Rejoice in the Lamb, a festival cantata composed by Benjamin Britten in 1943 for four soloists, SATB choir and organ. The cantata was commissioned by the Reverend Canon Walter Hussey for the celebration of the fiftieth anniversary of the consecration of St Matthew's Church, Northampton.

== Performances ==
On 27 December 2007, the London arts radio station Resonance FM broadcast the whole of Jubilate Agno. It was performed by Frank Key and Germander Speedwell.

== References in popular culture ==
Siobhan Carroll's award-winning For He Can Creep, a novelette centering on Jeoffry and Jubilate Agno, was adapted for Love, Death & Robots Volume 4.
