= For He Can Creep =

2017 science fiction novella by Siobhan Carroll

- First edition cover
- Author: Siobhan Carroll
- Cover artist: Red Nose Studio
- Language: English
- Genre: Fantasy
- Publisher: Tor.com (US)
- Publication date: July 10, 2019
- Publication place: United States
- Media type: E-book
- Pages: 29

"For He Can Creep" is a 2019 historical fantasy short story by Siobhan Carroll, about the historical figure Christopher Smart and his cat, Jeoffry. The story was adapted into the final episode of the fourth volume of the Netflix anthology series Love, Death & Robots, also titled "For He Can Creep".

== Synopsis ==
While Christopher Smart is confined for insanity in St. Luke's Asylum, he is repeatedly visited by Satan, who wants him to write a poem that will end the world — and only his cat Jeoffry (with the help of several other cats) can stop him.

== Reception ==
For He Can Creep won the 2020 Eugie Award and was a finalist for the 2019 Nebula Award for Best Novelette, the 2020 Hugo Award for Best Novelette. and the 2020 World Fantasy Award for Best Short Fiction.

Lela E. Buis considered it "highly entertaining" and "way too short". In Locus, Karen Burnham praised the portrayal of Jeoffry as "both charming and intense", emphasizing the "ultimate cat attitude poured into every line".

== Adaptation ==
The story was adapted into an animated episode of Love, Death & Robots Season 4, directed by Emily Dean with scriptwriting from the author Tamsyn Muir.
