= Into the Light (novel) =

2021 military science fiction novel by David Weber

- Cover of first edition hardcover
- Authors: David Weber; Chris Kennedy
- Cover artist: Stephan Martinière
- Language: English
- Genre: Alien invasion
- Publisher: Tor Books
- Publication date: 12 January 2021
- Publication place: United States
- Media type: Print (hardcover)
- Pages: 512
- ISBN: 978-0-7653-3145-8 (hardcover)
- OCLC: 1235898086
- Preceded by: Out of the Dark
- Followed by: To Challenge Heaven

Into the Light is an alien invasion science fiction novel by David Weber and Chris Kennedy released by Tor Books on January 12, 2021. It is the continuation of Weber's earlier book, Out of the Dark. A third book in the series, To Challenge Heaven, was released on January 16, 2024.

== Plot ==
On a devastated Earth, salvaged Shongairi technology sets humanity up to recover and advance beyond the tragedy of alien invasion, soon to be united under the banner of the newly formed Planetary Union. As the leap in technology and scientific knowledge sets humanity up for a bright interstellar future, Dave Dvorak starts looking among the stars for allies in the coming confrontation with the Galactic Hegemony.

At the same time, Vlad Dracula and Stephen Buchevsky lead the captured and now vampire-crewed Shongairi fleet on its journey to enemy space.

== Main characters ==
=== Humans ===
- Dave Dvorak: The owner of an indoor shooting range and one of the leaders of the new U.S. government
- Rob Wilson: A former U.S. Marine sergeant and Dvorak's brother in law
- President Howell: The President of the United States

=== Vampires ===
- Vlad Draculea (a.k.a. Mircea Basarab): A Romanian vampire with a long and mysterious past.
- Major Dan "Longbow" Torino: A former U.S. Air Force pilot turned Vampire leader
- Stephen Buchevsky: A former U.S. Marine and Vlad's first lieutenant

== Reception ==
This book was reviewed by the Wall Street Journal and Publishers Weekly.
