= Eugie Award =

Award for writers of short speculative fiction

Eugie Foster Memorial Award for Short Fiction
- Awarded for: Innovative and essential short speculative fiction first published in the previous calendar year
- Location: Dragon Con
- First award: 2016
- Website: www.eugiefoster.com/eugieaward

The Eugie Foster Memorial Award for Short Fiction is an annual juried award presented to the author of a piece of short speculative fiction (20,000 words or fewer) published during the previous calendar year. It seeks to recognize fiction that is "irreplacable" and that "will become essential to speculative fiction readers." The award is named in honour of Eugie Foster, a prolific speculative writer and editor. It was first presented in 2016 at the awards banquet at Dragon Con, and has continued to be presented at the same venue in years since.

== Winners and nominees ==
In the following table, the years correspond to the date of the ceremony, rather than when the work was first published. Each year links to the corresponding "year in literature". Entries with a light yellow background and an asterisk (*) next to the writer's name have won the award; those with a white background are the other nominees on the shortlist. Shortlists are listed alphabetically by last name.

* Winners

Year	Author	Work	Publisher or publication	Ref.
2016	Catherynne M. Valente*	"The Long Goodnight of Violet Wild"	Clarkesworld	
2016	Aliette de Bodard	"Three Cups of Grief, by Starlight"	Clarkesworld	
2016	Tamsyn Muir	"The Deepwater Bride"	The Magazine of Fantasy & Science Fiction	
2016	Ursula Vernon	"Pocosin"	Apex Magazine	
2016	Alyssa Wong	"Hungry Daughters of Starving Mothers"^{[external link]}	Nightmare Magazine	
2017	N. K. Jemisin*	"The City Born Great"	Tor.com	
2017	Amal El-Mohtar	"Seasons of Glass and Iron"^{[external link]}	The Starlit Wood	
2017	Suzanne Palmer	"Ten Poems for the Mossums, One for the Man"	Asimov's Science Fiction Magazine	
2017	Catherynne M. Valente	"The Limitless Perspective of Master Peek, or, the Luminescence of Debauchery"	Beneath Ceaseless Skies	
2017	Alyssa Wong	"You'll Surely Drown Here If You Stay"	Uncanny Magazine	
2018	Fran Wilde*	"Clearly Lettered in a Mostly Steady Hand"	Uncanny Magazine	
2018	Violet Allen	"Infinite Love Engine"	Lightspeed	
2018	Tobias S. Buckell	"Zen and the Art of Starship Maintenance"	Cosmic Powers	
2018	Matthew Kressel	"The Last Novelist (or A Dead Lizard in the Yard)"	Tor.com	
2018	Sarah Pinsker	"And Then There Were (N-One)"^{[external link]}	Uncanny Magazine	
2019	Simone Heller*	"When We Were Starless"	Clarkesworld	
2019	Siobhan Carroll	"The War of Light and Shadow, in Five Dishes"	Beneath Ceaseless Skies	
2019	Alix E. Harrow	"A Witch's Guide to Escape: A Practical Compendium of Portal Fantasies"	Apex	
2019	Cae Hawksmoor	"Barleycorn"	Abyss & Apex	
2019	Kathleen Jennings	"The Heart of Owl Abbas"	Tor.com	
2020	Siobhan Carroll*	"For He Can Creep"^{[external link]}	Tor.com	
2020	L Chan	"The House Wins in the End"	The Dark	
2020	Andy Dudak	"Love in the Time of Immuno-Sharing"	Analog	
2020	Thoraiya Dyer	"A Civilization Dreams of Absolutely Nothing"	Analog	
2020	Jerome Stueart	"Postlude to the Afternoon of a Faun"	The Magazine of Fantasy & Science Fiction	
2021	Elaine Cuyegkeng*	"The Genetic Alchemist's Daughter"	Black Cranes	
2021	KT Bryski	"The Bone-Stag Walks"	Lightspeed	
2021	Alix E. Harrow	"The Sycamore and the Sybil"	Uncanny Magazine	
2021	Usman T. Malik	"City of Red Midnight: A Hikayat"	Tor.com	
2021	Lavie Tidhar	"Judge Dee and the Limits of the Law"	Tor.com	
2022	Sarah Pinsker*	"Where Oaken Hearts Do Gather"	Uncanny Magazine	
2022	Adam-Troy Castro	"A Tableau of Things That Are"	Lightspeed Magazine	
2022	Catherynne M. Valente	"L'Espirit de L'Escalier"	Tor.com	
2022	Aimee Ogden	"A Flower Cannot Love the Hand"	Beneath Ceaseless Skies	
2022	Caroline M. Yoachim	"Colors of the Immortal Palette"	Uncanny Magazine	
2023	Rich Larson	"Quandary Aminu vs the Butterfly Man"	Tor.com	
2023	Michelle Denham	"A Chestnut, a Persimmon, a Cunning Lie"	PodCastle	
2023	Meg Elison	"The Little God of the Staircase"	The Dark Magazine	
2023	Su-Yee Lin	"The Pigeon-Keeper’s Daughter"	Strange Horizons	
2023	Spencer Nitkey	"Nine Theories of Time"	Apex Magazine	
2024	Rachael K. Jones	"The Sound of Children Screaming"	Nightmare Magazine	
2024	Rich Larson	"Even if Such Ways Are Bad"	Reactor	
2024	Rebecca Roanhorse	"Falling Bodies"	Amazon	
2024	R. S. A. Garcia	"Tantie Merle and the Farmhand 4200"	Uncanny Magazine	
2024	Naomi Kritzer	"The Year Without Sunshine"	Uncanny Magazine	
2025	Mary Robinette Kowal	"Marginalia"	Uncanny Magazine	
2025	Max Franciscovich	"After We Kill Our Father and Before We Reach the Mainland"	Beneath Ceaseless Skies	
2025	Tammy Komoff	"The Midnight Commuter"	Abyss & Apex	
2025	A. W. Prihandita	"Negative Scholarship on the Fifth State of Being"	Clarkesworld	
2025	Caroline M. Yoachim	"We Will Teach You How to Read - We Will Teach You How to Read"	Lightspeed Magazine	
2026	A. C. Wise	"Wolf Moon, Antler Moon"	Reactor	
2026	Ichabod Cassius Kilroy	"Concerning the Multiplicity of Children in Central Florida's Suburbanized Wet Lands"	Analog Science Fiction & Fact	
2026	Louis Inglis Hall	"Four People I Need You to Kill Before the Dance Begins"	Clarkesworld	
2026	Leah Ning	"Reverent"	PodCastle	
2026	Catherynne M. Valente	"When He Calls Your Name"	Uncanny Magazine	
