= Out of the Dark (Weber novel) =

2010 alien invasion science fiction novel by David Weber

- Cover of first edition hardcover
- Author: David Weber
- Cover artist: Stephan Martinière
- Language: English
- Genre: Alien invasion
- Publisher: Tor Books
- Publication date: 28 September 2010
- Publication place: United States
- Media type: Print (hardcover)
- Pages: 381
- ISBN: 978-0-7653-2412-2 (hardcover)
- OCLC: 567188387
- Followed by: Into the Light

Out of the Dark is an alien invasion science fiction novel by David Weber released by Tor Books on September 28, 2010. It is an extended version of the short story of the same name published in the 2010 anthology Warriors edited by Gardner Dozois and George R. R. Martin. A sequel, titled Into the Light, was published more than a decade later in January 2021. The third book in the series, To Challenge Heaven, was released on January 16, 2024.

== Plot ==
The 2010s: Alien scientists from an alliance of races known as the Galactic Hegemony review footage of the Battle of Agincourt, taken by a survey ship during the Hundred Years' War. They liken humans to the carnivorous, vulpine Shongairi, a species recently admitted to the Hegemony. Ultimately, a Shongairi fleet is sent to establish control of Earth in the name of the Hegemony. Upon arrival in the Solar System, the Shongairi are amazed to discover that in six centuries since the Agincourt survey, the technology base of Earth has advanced considerably, to the Hegemony's classification of "Level II."

The Hegemony constitution prohibits conquest of any Level II or higher society. Fleet Commander Thikair, head of the Shongairi expedition, resolves to ignore this law in service of Shongairi plans to advance beyond their Hegemony rivals and ultimately conquer the galaxy; a human client state could provide scientists and soldiers to this end. Furthermore, the Hegemony's leaders have quietly authorized the Shongairi to attack the "bloodthirsty" humans. Hegemony leaders, mostly pacifist herbivores, view humans as dangerous and morally beyond redemption; they are to be subjugated, or if necessary, exterminated.

The Shongairi kill more than half of Earth's population with orbital strikes, incorrectly assuming the survivors will surrender. As the Hegemony has to date prohibited war on advanced societies, the Shongairi are completely unprepared for the conflict that ensues. U.S. Air Force remnants using stealth F-22 Raptor aircraft shoot down a flight of Shongairi transport shuttles. U.S. and Russian tanks prove far superior against poorly armored and armed Shongairi vehicles. The Shongairi use further kinetic strikes to destroy the attackers and the remaining human cities as a reprisal, but the survivors continue the struggle as loosely organized guerillas. Superior infantry tactics and weapons cause irreplaceable Shongairi casualties to mount.

In Romania, U.S. Marine Stephen Buchevsky, whose family died in the initial strikes, joins a band of fighters led by one Mircea Basarab, who are more than meets the eye. In space, Fleet Commander Thikair ruefully concludes that human nature compels survivors of Shongairi atrocities to avenge their loved ones at all costs. Unlike other known species, humans have no natural "submission" instinct to superior powers; altruism and sacrifice of self to safeguard the innocent are, to the aliens, marks of "insanity."

Thikair plots to develop a bioweapon that will "accidentally" be released in the U.S. to fulfill the original contingency plan. This requires the kidnapping of humans as test subjects, to ensure the bioweapon will serve its purpose of killing every remaining human on Earth. When guerillas in the U.S. and Romania become aware of the Shongairi plot, they manage to save some victims, but the Shongairi use their air supremacy to continue their genocidal mission.

Basarab arises at last under his true name: Vlad the Impaler, aka Count Dracula. After centuries of isolation in the mountains of Wallachia, where he had sought redemption for his murderous past, Dracula resolves to sire a new army of vampires, among whom is Buchevsky, who otherwise would have died in battle. The Shongairi are no match for the immortal vampires, and flee to space as Thikair plots to destroy Earth itself. The vampires board and seize control of the Shongairi fleet. Dracula reveals to the despondent Thikair that he has learned everything about the Shongairi and the Hegemony, and the vampires will take Thikair's ships back to Shongairi space to exact vengeance. Invoking the name of his murdered children, vampire Buchevsky kills Thikair.

On Earth, salvaged Shongairi technology sets humanity up to recover and advance beyond the tragedy, united under the banner of the Terran Empire.

== Main characters ==
=== Humans and vampires ===
- Master Sergeant Stephen Buchevsky: A U.S. Marine initially stationed in Afghanistan.
- Dave Dvorak: The owner of an indoor shooting range
- Rob Wilson: A former U.S. Marine sergeant, Dvorak's brother in law
- Major Dan "Longbow" Torino: A U.S. Air Force pilot flying the F-22 Raptor
- President Harriet Palmer: The President of the United States
- Mircea Basarab: A Romanian community leader with a mysterious past.

=== Shongairi ===
- Fleet Commander Thikair: The supreme commander of the invasion force
- Ground Force Commander Thairys: The expedition's senior ground commander
- Ground Base Commander Shairez: A junior ground commander, and lead scientist

== Reception ==
A review by Publishers Weekly says that "Weber pulls off this conceit in audacious style with a focus on military-powered action that will thrill fans of his Honor Harrington series, and he keeps the pedal to the metal right up to the almost unbelievable conclusion." Booklist criticized the action scenes as "redundant and overburdened with long lists of munitions model numbers", the difficulty of distinguishing between most characters, and the introduction of vampires late into the story.
