= Operation Gideon (disambiguation) =

Operation Gideon was a Haganah offensive launched in the closing days of the British Mandate in Palestine.

Operation Gideon may also refer to:

- El Junquito raid of 2018, codenamed Operation Gideon, against Venezuelan rebel Óscar Alberto Pérez
- Operation Gideon (2020), a military operation by dissidents in Venezuela

== See also ==
- Gideon (disambiguation)
