= The Bone Houses =

2019 young adult fantasy novel by Emily-Lloyd Jones

- First edition
- Author: Emily-Lloyd Jones
- Audio read by: Moira Quirk
- Language: English
- Genre: horror fantasy young adult
- Publisher: Little, Brown Books for Young Readers
- Publication date: 2019
- Publication place: United States
- ISBN: 9780316418416 (First edition)

The Bone Houses is a 2019 young adult horror fantasy novel by Emily Lloyd-Jones, following Ryn, a female gravedigger, and Ellis, an apprentice mapmaker, as they try to stop "bone houses" (reanimated corpses) from roaming their world and affecting Ryn's family business. The book received mixed reviews from critics, and was also praised for its disability representation, owing to the character Ellis having chronic pain in the story. The audiobook was read by Moira Quirk.

== Plot ==
Aderyn (nicknamed "Ryn") is a seventeen-year-old gravedigger who operates the family business with her siblings in the rural village of Colbren. The business was inherited after the deaths of their parents, and has been suffering as a result of reanimated corpses, known as "bone houses", coming to life and antagonizing people. The village's suspicion is heightened when Ellis, an apprentice mapmaker boy who is Ryn's age, appears in town. They both team up, along with a "bone goat" (reanimated pet goat), with the goal of finding out how to stop the bone houses. Despite Ryn's caustic and often morbid demeanor, she begins to fall in love with Ellis as she gets to know him, but she finds his enigmatic past troublesome. Ellis suffers from chronic pain from a badly healed injury. Ryn and Ellis arrive at a dreary homestead and discover that Ellis's deceased mother had resurrected Ellis via a magical "birth cauldron" when he was shot in the shoulder with an arrow and killed, which is why Ellis has no memory of his family. He embraces his dead mother, only to watch as her decaying body falls apart as the now-avenged spirit leaves it. Ellis forms a romantic relationship with Ryn and they return to Colbren, now that the bone houses are gone and Ryn's gravedigging business will no longer be under threat.

== Reception ==
The Bone Houses received mixed to positive reviews from critics, with two starred reviews from Booklist and Voice of Youth Advocates. Booklist called it a "melancholic horror novel digs its way into the heart," and VOYA hailed it as, "exciting and imaginative."

Publishers Weekly stated, "the appealing main characters are notable for their persistence—Aderyn through ever-mounting obstacles, and Ellis through his chronic pain. The story serves as a meditation on the complicated relationship between the living and the dead, combining fear, humor and enchantment in equal measure, and alloying them with humor." Book Riot placed the book on its list of 16 "#OwnVoices" titles for featuring a disabled character, noting that Ellis suffers from chronic pain and is the book's secondary main character. Literary Hub agreed, pointing out that the character's disability does not define him wholly but is a part of him, stating, "Ellis, a mapmaker, is an apprentice with a mysterious past, but the mystery surrounding him is never defined by his chronic pain."

Kirkus Reviews was more mixed about the book, stating, "the journey is slow to get started, the numerous attacks and fight scenes with bone houses grow tedious, and the twists are predictable, but nonetheless this Welsh-inspired story is haunting and compelling." They also pointed out that apart from a dark-skinned villager depicted as an outsider, all characters were presumed white. Canadian-based critic Literary Lion provided a more neutral review, saying, "The Bone Houses is a beautiful story about loss and letting go. The base plot is a bit formulaic and I didn’t feel much for the romance but both Aderyn and Ellis are wonderful characters and the ending is supremely satisfying."
