= Asylum confinement of Christopher Smart =

Historical event (1757–1763)

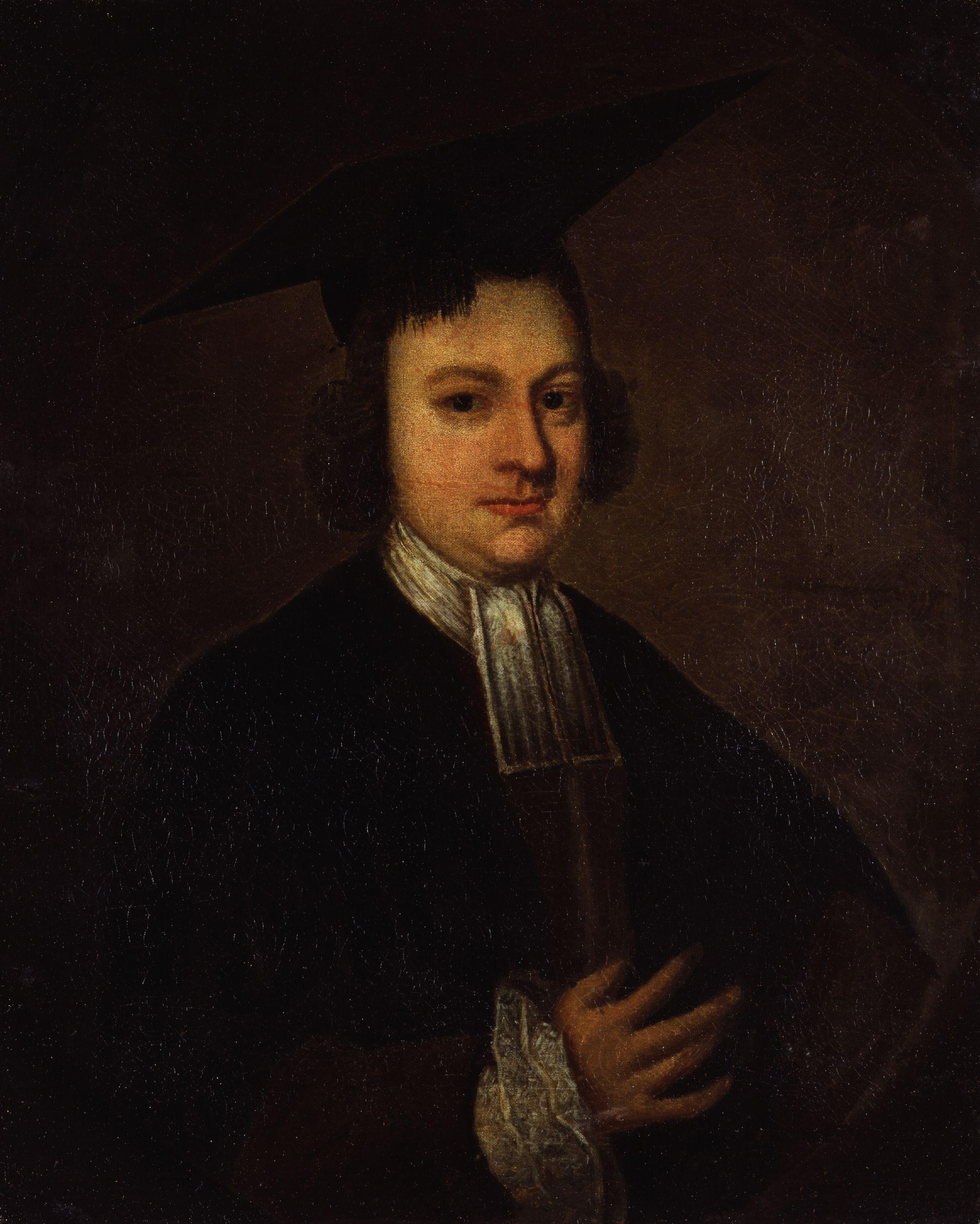
Portrait of Smart, c. 1745

The English poet Christopher Smart (1722–1771) was confined to mental asylums from May 1757 until January 1763. Smart was admitted to St Luke's Hospital for Lunatics, Upper Moorfields, London, on 6 May 1757. He was taken there by his father-in-law, John Newbery, although he may have been confined in a private madhouse before then. While in St Luke's he wrote Jubilate Agno and A Song to David, the poems considered to be his greatest works. Although many of his contemporaries agreed that Smart was "mad", accounts of his condition and its ramifications varied, and some felt that he had been committed unfairly.

Smart was diagnosed as "incurable" while at St Luke's, and when they ran out of funds for his care he was moved to Mr. Potter's asylum, Bethnal Green. All that is known of his years of confinement is that he wrote poetry. Smart's isolation led him to abandon the poetic genres of the 18th century that had marked his earlier work and to write religious poetry such as Jubilate Agno ("Rejoice in the Lamb"). His asylum poetry reveals a desire for "unmediated revelation", and it is possible that the self-evaluation found in his poetry represents an expression of evangelical Christianity.

Late 18th-century critics felt that Smart's madness justified them in ignoring his A Song to David, but during the following century Robert Browning and his contemporaries considered his condition to be the source of his genius. It was not until the 20th century, with the rediscovery of Jubilate Agno (not published until 1939), that critics reconsidered Smart's case and began to see him as a revolutionary poet, the possible target of a plot by his father-in-law, a publisher, to silence him.

== Background ==
Smart was confined to asylums during a time of debate about the nature of madness and its treatment. During the 18th century, madness was "both held to reveal inner truth and condemned to silence and exclusion as something unintelligible by reason, and therefore threatening to society and to humanity". It was commonly held to be an incurable condition, and anyone who had it should be isolated from society. Physician William Battie—who later treated Smart—wrote:

[We] find that Madness is, contrary to the opinion of some unthinking persons, as manageable as many other distempers, which are equally dreadful and obstinate, and yet are not looked upon as incurable, and that such unhappy objects ought by no means to be abandoned, much less shut up in loathsome prisons as criminals or nuisances to the society.

In particular, Battie defined madness as "deluded imagination". However, he was criticized by other physicians, such as John Monro, who worked at Bethlem Hospital. In his Remarks on Dr. Battie's Treatise on Madness, Monro explained that those who were mad had the correct perceptions, but that they lacked the ability to judge properly. Although Monro promoted ideas of reform, his suggested treatment—beating patients—was as harsh on patients as Battie's preferred option, of completely isolating patients from society.

In 1758, Battie and others argued that those deemed "mad" were abused under the British asylum system, and they pushed for parliamentary action. Battie's Treatise on Madness emphasised the problems of treating the hospitals as tourist attractions and the punitive measures taken against patients. The arguments of Battie and others resulted in the passage of the Act for Regulating Private Madhouses (1774), but were too late to help Smart.

Modern critics, however, have a more cynical view of the 18th-century use of the term "madness" when diagnosing patients; psychiatrist Thomas Szasz viewed the idea of madness as arbitrary and unnatural. Agreeing with Szasz's position, philosopher Michel Foucault emphasized that asylums were used in the 18th century to attack dissenting views and that the idea of madness was a cultural fear held by the British public, rather than a legitimate medical condition. In particular, Foucault considered the 18th century a time of "great confinement". This description is consistent with Smart's 1760s writings on the subject in which, according to Thomas Keymer, "the category of madness is insistently relativized, and made to seem little more than the invention of a society strategically concerned to discredit all utterances or conduct that threatens its interests and norms."

18th century treatment of inpatients was simple: they were to be fed daily a light diet of bread, oatmeal, some meat or cheese, and a little amount of beer, which were inadequate in meeting daily nutritional needs; they were denied contact with outsiders, including family members; and they would be denied access to that which was deemed to be the cause of their madness (these causes ranged from alcohol and food to working outside). If their actions appeared "afresh and without assignable cause", then their condition would be labelled as "original" madness and deemed incurable. An institution like St Luke's, run by Battie, held both "curable" and "incurable" patients. There were few spots available for patients to receive free treatment, and many were released after a year to make room for new admittances.

== Asylum ==
During the 1740s, Smart published many poems while a student at Pembroke College, Cambridge. He eventually left the university in 1749 to devote his time to poetry. In 1750, Smart started to familiarise himself with Grub Street, London's writing district, and met John Newbery, a publisher. Soon after, Newbery began publishing Smart's works in various magazines and in collections, including Poems on Several Occasions (1752). Of these works, Smart was known for his Seatonian Prize-winning poems, his pastoral poem The Hop-Garden, and his mock epic The Hilliad. In 1752, Smart married Newbery's daughter, Anna Maria Carnan, and had two daughters with her by 1754. Although many of Smart's works were published between 1753 and 1755, he had little money to provide for his family. At the end of 1755, he finished a translation of the works of Horace, but even that provided little income. Having no other choices, Smart signed a 99-year-long contract in November 1755 to produce a weekly paper entitled The Universal Visiter or Monthly Memorialist, and the strain of writing caused Smart's health to deteriorate.

On 5 June 1756, Smart's father-in-law Newbery published, without permission, Smart's Hymn to the Supreme Being, a poem which thanked God for recovery from an illness of some kind, possibly a "disturbed mental state". During the illness, Smart was possibly confined to Newbery's home and unable to write or be socially active. Out of sympathy for Smart, many of his friends, including writer and critic Samuel Johnson, began to write in the Universal Visiter to fulfill Smart's contractual obligation to produce content for the magazine. The publication of Hymn to the Supreme Being marked the beginning of Smart's obsession with religion and eventual confinement for madness because he began praying "without ceasing".

Smart's behaviour was probably influenced by St Paul's command in the First Epistle to the Thessalonians to "Pray without ceasing" and William Law's The Spirit of Prayer, which argues that a constant state of prayer will establish a connection with God. Smart began by praying at regular intervals but this slowly deteriorated into irregular praying in which he would interrupt his friends' activities and call them into the street to pray with him. These calls for public prayer continued until an incident that Smart later described in Jubilate Agno: "For I blessed God in St James's Park till I routed all the company... For the officers of the peace are at variance with me, and the watchman smites me with his staff" (Jubilate Agno B 90–91).

Christopher Hunter, Smart's biographer and nephew, described the situation:

Though the fortune as well as the constitution of Mr. Smart required the utmost care, he was equally negligent in the management of both, and his various and repeated embarrassments acting upon an imagination uncommonly fervid, produced temporary alienations of mind; which at last were attended with paroxysms so violent and continued as to render confinement necessary.

Hunter reports that Samuel Johnson visited Smart during the latter's confinement, and it was Johnson that, "on the first approaches of Mr Smart's malady, wrote several papers for a periodical publication in which that gentleman was concerned." However, at no time did Smart ever believe himself to be insane; these meetings began before Smart was ever put into asylum because he still contributed, although not as significantly, to the Universal Visiter. In joking about writing for the Universal Visiter, Johnson claimed: "for poor Smart, while he was mad, not then knowing the terms on which he was engaged to write ... I hoped his wits would return to him. Mine returned to me, and I wrote in 'the Universal Visitor' no longer."

There are other possibilities beyond madness or religious fervor that may have led to Smart's confinement: Newbery may have used the imprisonment of his son-in-law as leverage to control the publication of Smart's work and as a warning to others who worked for him not to cross him. Another theory suggests Smart's actions were a result of alcohol, and had nothing to do with a mental imbalance. However, Smart may have been imprisoned for embarrassing his father-in-law in some way, which could have resulted from an incident in which Smart drank. Hester Thrale reinforced this latter possibility when she claimed that Smart's "religious fervor" tended to coincide with times that Smart was intoxicated. Smart's own testimony that he "blessed God in St. James's Park till I routed all the company" (Jubilate Agno B 90–91) as representing his religious madness is equally dismissed as resulting from drinking, as he was known for pulling pranks and the Board of Green Cloth, the government body that controlled St James's Park, would treat most disturbances in the park as resulting from madness. If Smart was placed into the asylum as a result of actions at St James's, he would not have been the only one, since records show that the Board of Green Cloth was responsible for admitting sixteen people to Bethlem Hospital for "frenzy" at St James's Park during the century prior to Smart being placed in St Luke's.

The specific events of Smart's confinement are unknown. He may have been in a private madhouse before St Luke's and later moved from St Luke's to Mr Potter's asylum until his release. At St Luke's, he transitioned from being "curable" to "incurable", and was moved to Mr Potter's asylum for monetary reasons. During Smart's confinement time, his wife Anna left and took the children with her to Ireland. There is no record that he ever saw her again. His isolation led him into writing religious poetry, and he abandoned the traditional genres of the 18th century that marked his earlier poetry when he wrote Jubilate Agno.

During his time in asylum, Smart busied himself with a daily ritual of writing poetry; these lyric fragments eventually formed his Jubilate Agno and A Song to David. Smart might have turned to writing poetry as a way to focus the mind or as self-therapy. Although 20th-century critics debate whether his new poetic self-examination represents an expression of evangelical Christianity, his poetry during his isolation does show a desire for "unmediated revelation" from God. There is an "inner light" that serves as a focal point for Smart and his poems written during his confinement, and that inner light connects him to the Christian God.

=== St Luke's Hospital for Lunatics ===
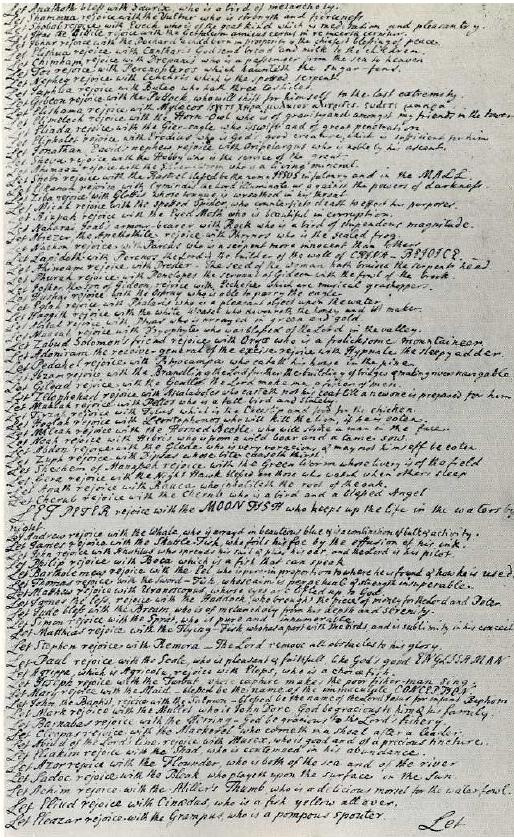
A page from Jubilate Agno written while in asylum

Few details are known about Smart's time at St Luke's Hospital for Lunatics. He was admitted to St Luke's on 6 May 1757 as a "Curable Patient". It is possible that Smart was confined at Newbery's behest over old debts and a poor relationship that existed between the two; Newbery had previously mocked Smart's immorality in A Collection of Pretty Poems for the Amusement of Children six Foot High. Regardless of Newbery's exact reasons, there is evidence suggesting that Newbery's admittance of Smart into the mental asylum was not based on madness. To have Smart admitted, Newbery probably provided a small bribe, although bribes were against St Luke's policy.

There is little information about Smart's condition during his stay at St Luke's, possibly because Battie disallowed visits to his patients, including by their own family members. One of the few records that survive of Smart's time at St Luke's was an entry in St Luke's Minute Book, which read:

12 May 1758
Dr. Battie having acquainted this Committee that Christopher Smart (who was admitted on the 6th day of May 1757) continues disordered in his Senses notwithstanding he has been admitted into this Hospital above 12 Calendar Months and from the present Circumstances of his Case there is not Suffit. reason to expect his speedy Recovery And he being brought up and examined. Ordered. That he be discharged and that Notice be sent to his Securities to take him away.

During Smart's confinement at St Luke's, not even other doctors were allowed to see Smart unless they had received personal permission from Battie. It was improbable that Smart could have left the asylum without being released by Battie. Even if Smart would have attempted to obtain release via legal means, the rules for subpoenaing release would have been almost impossible to follow based on the system that Battie had in place, which isolated the individual from all contact. Eventually, Smart was deemed "incurable" and would not have been released by the hospital but for its lack of funds.

=== Mr Potter's madhouse ===
For I will consider my Cat Jeoffry.

* * * * *

For when his day's work is done his business more properly begins.
For he keeps the Lord's watch in the night against the adversary.
For he counteracts the powers of darkness by his electrical skin and glaring eyes.
For he counteracts the Devil, who is death, by brisking about the life.
For in his morning orisons he loves the sun and the sun loves him.
For he is of the tribe of Tiger.
For the Cherub Cat is a term of the Angel Tiger.
For he has the subtlety and hissing of a serpent, which in goodness he suppresses.
For he will not do destruction, if he is well-fed, neither will he spit without provocation.
For he purrs in thankfulness, when God tells him he's a good Cat.

— Smart's Jubilate Agno, Fragment B Lines 695, 717–726

After being released from St Luke's, Smart was taken to a private madhouse. Elizabeth LeNoir, Smart's daughter, was brought to see her father and stated that he was "committed by Mr Newbery to the care of a Mr Potter who kept a private house at Bethnal Green". She described her experience as being held in a "small neat parlour". However, Mr Potter's private madhouse was not "homely", and Smart's treatments were far worse, as he describes: "For they work on me with their harping-irons, which is a barbarous instrument, because I am more unguarded than others" (Jubilate Agno B 129). Smart was left alone for four years, except for his cat Jeoffry and the occasional gawker who would come to see those deemed mad. Piozzi described Smart's general situation: "He was both a wit and a scholar, and visited as such while under confinement for MADNESS." It is very possible that he felt "homeless" during his confinement and surely felt that he was in a "limbo... between public and private space" from being watched by outsiders.

In London, only a few of his works were still being published, but the proceeds were taken by Newbery. However, Smart did get to see published a collection of his work under the pseudonym "Mrs Midnight" titled Mrs. Midnight's Orations; and other Select Pieces: as they were spoken at the Oratory in the Hay-Market, London. Smart did not profit from the work, but he was able to see at least some of his previous work being printed again. Smart, according to his 20th-century biographer Arthur Sherbo, had only "his God and his poetry". A few of his loyal friends eventually grew tired of the treatment Smart received and freed him from Mr Potter's.

=== Release ===
There is little information about how and why Smart was released from asylum, but his daughter claimed: "He grew better, and some misjudging friends who misconstrued Mr Newbery's great kindness in placing him under necessary & salutary restriction which might possibly have eventually wrought a cure, invited him to dinner and he returned to his confinement no more." What is known about the actual events is that John Sherratt, Christopher Smart's friend, believed that Smart's confinement was unfair and wanted to negotiate Smart's release. In January 1763, he met with a parliamentary committee to discuss the issue of individuals falsely imprisoned and abuses that they would receive in asylums. In particular, Sherratt argued that many were admitted for habitual intoxication, which undermined Battie's and other asylum keeper's reputations. A finding by the parliamentary committee released 27 January 1763 bolstered Sherratt's chances to release Smart. To those around him, Smart appeared perfectly sane, and he was most likely released because of legislation concurrently being passed in parliament advocating for a reform to patient care. Smart left the asylum on 30 January 1763 with Sherratt.

Upon leaving asylum, Smart took the manuscripts of A Song to David, many translations of Psalms, and Jubilate Agno. A Song to David was published on 6 April 1763. Harsh reviews followed which mocked Smart's time in the asylum instead of dealing with the poems. Jubilate Agno stayed in manuscript form and passed into the hands of the friends of William Cowper, a poet also placed into asylum and Smart's contemporary, when they investigated the concept of "madness". The work stayed in private holdings until it was rediscovered in the 20th century by William Stead. It was not published until 1939 when it was printed with the title Rejoice in the Lamb: A Song from Bedlam.

== Analysis ==
Samuel Johnson's biographer James Boswell described a moment when Charles Burney inquired of his friend Johnson of Smart's state. Johnson used the term "madness" to comment on the state of society before explaining to Burney that Smart's actions that were deemed symptoms of madness were actually reasonable:

Madness frequently discovers itself merely by unnecessary deviation from the usual mode of the world. My poor friend Smart shewed the disturbance of his mind, by falling upon his knees, and saying his prayers in the street, or in any other unusual place. Now although, rationally speaking, it is greater madness not to pray at all, than to pray as Smart did, I am afraid there are so many who do not pray, that their understanding is not called in question.

Concerning this unfortunate poet, Christopher Smart, who was confined in a mad-house, he had, at another time, the following conversation with Dr [Charles] Burney: – Burney. 'How does poor Smart do, Sir; is he likely to recover?' Johnson. 'It seems as if his mind had ceased to struggle with the disease; for he grows fat upon it.' Burney. 'Perhaps, Sir, that may be from want of exercise.' Johnson. 'No, Sir; he has partly as much exercise as he used to have, for he digs in the garden. Indeed, before his confinement, he used for exercise to walk to the ale-house; but he was carried back again. I did not think he ought to be shut up. His infirmities are not noxious to society. He insisted on people praying with him; and I'd as lief pray with Kit [=Christopher] Smart as any one else. Another charge was that he did not love clean linen; and I have no passion for it.' – Johnson continued. 'Mankind have a great aversion to intellectual labour; but even supposing knowledge to be easily attainable, more people would be content to be ignorant than would take even a little trouble to acquire it.'

In an article printed in the Gentleman's Magazine, Hester Piozzi, Smart's acquaintance and Johnson's close friend, argued that in many aspects Smart appears sane:

In every other transaction of life no man's wits could be more regular than those of Smart, for this prevalence of one idea pertinaciously keeping the first place in his head had in no sense, except in what immediately related to itself, perverted his judgement at all; his opinions were unchanged as before, nor did he seem more likely to fall into a state of distraction than any other man; less so, perhaps, as he calmed every violent start of passion by prayer.

Beyond Smart's circle of friends, few were willing to dismiss claims that Smart was affected by madness. Most contemporary literary critics knew of Smart's time in asylum and, upon publication of his A Song to David, called attention to aspects of the poem which they could use to claim that Smart was still "mad". The view was widely held, and the poet William Mason wrote to Thomas Gray, "I have seen his Song to David & from thence conclude him as mad as ever."

=== 19th century ===
It was a century before a positive twist was put on Christopher Smart's time in asylum; the Victorian poet Robert Browning argued that A Song to David was great because Smart was mad at the time. In his poem Parleyings (1887), Browning claimed:

Armed with this instance, have I diagnosed
Your case, my Christopher? The man was sound
And sane at starting: all at once the ground
Gave way beneath his step
* * * * *
Then—as heaven were loth
To linger;—let earth understand too well
How heaven at need can operate—off fell
The flame-robe, and the untransfigured man
Resumed sobriety,—as he began,
So did he end nor alter pace, not he!

To Browning, Smart's temporary madness was what allowed him to compose in A Song to David poetry similar to that of John Milton and John Keats. Christopher Smart, as Browning's poem continued,

pierced the screen
'Twixt thing and word, lit language straight from soul,—
Left no fine film-flake on the naked coal
Live from the censer

Browning's remarks brought about a later appreciation of A Song to David and Smart's madness. A review of Browning's Parleying claimed that Christopher Smart was "possessed by his subject... and where there is true possession – where the fires of the poet's imagination are not choked by self-consciousness or by too much fuel from the intellect – idiosyncrasy, mannerism, and even conventional formulae are for the time 'burnt and purged away'."

The 19th-century poet Dante Gabriel Rossetti emphasised the benefits of Smart's madness and claimed that A Song to David was "the only great accomplished poem of the last century." Two years later, Francis Palgrave continued the theme when he wrote that the Song exhibited "noble wildness and transitions from grandeur to tenderness, from Earth to Heaven" and that it was "unique in our Poetry." Seven years after Palgrave, critic John Churton Collins agreed with Rossetti and Palgrave, but to a lesser extent, when he wrote, "This poem stands alone, the most extraordinary phenomenon, perhaps, in our literature, the one rapt strain in the poetry of the eighteenth century, the work of a poet who, though he produced much, has not produced elsewhere a single line which indicates the power here displayed."

=== 20th century and contemporary ===
Twentieth-century critics favoured the view that Smart had some kind of mental distress when writing his poems. A review by "Mathews" titled "Thin Partitions", on 30 March 1901 The Academy, claimed that:

Now Christopher Smart was a very beggarly poet of the eighteenth century ... but had not the smallest claim to rank with those great men beyond their common trade of poem. Kit Smart, in fact, though he wrote a pestilent deal of verse, could not write poetry—nor anything else ... Legally mad, that is; for he appears to have been very mad in his senses, and a decent citizen out of them. He went mad—legally and medically—once, and nothing came out of it, perhaps because he was not mad enough. Then he went mad again and being duly shut up in Bedlam wrote one of the finest outbursts of lyric genius in the eighteenth century—perhaps the finest-before the advent of Blake ... Smart regained his senses, and therewith his hopeless inability to write poetry. And he never did anything after.

In 1933, A. E. Housman sided with Browning's and Mathew's interpretation and connected Smart's madness with poetic genius in his lecture The Name and Nature of Poetry: "As matters actually stand, who are the English poets of that age in whom pre-eminently one can hear and recognize the true poetic accent emerging clearly from the contemporary dialect? These four: Collins, Christopher Smart, Cowper, and Blake. And what other characteristic had these four in common? They were mad." In 1994, Branimir Rieger differed from Housman's view by distancing Smart from the others when he argued that "Collins and Cowper pine as isolated individuals, guiltily aware of a vitality that is not finally human but divine. Smart soars beyond individuality to embrace that vitality, but at a cost of all human relationship."

However, there are many that disagreed that Smart was mad; Edward Ainsworth and Charles Noyes, when discussing Smart's Hymn to the Supreme Being, said, "The mind that composed this hymn was not deranged. Yet in the poem one sees the morbidly religious mind which, in disorder, was to produce the Jubilate Agno, and, with order restored, the Song to David. Additionally, they claimed that Smart's

preternatural excitement to prayer seems to have been poor Smart's only real mental aberration, unless his drunkenness be considered pathological. When his mind was removed entirely from the field of prayer, he was but little changed from his sane state. His powers of reason, though thus warped, were not taken from him, and he neither raved nor sank into mental lethargy.

Nevertheless, Ainsworth and Noyes were not completely sceptical about Smart's diagnosis when they continued: "But when the desire to pray struck him, Smart abandoned what the world chose to call rationality."

In 1960, neurologist Russell Brain diagnosed Smart as suffering from cyclothymia or manic depression. Brain based his diagnosis on Smart's own claims about how he felt, and he concluded that "in Smart's case the mental illness was not the result of his drunkenness, but he drank because he was mentally unstable." Arthur Sherbo, in 1967, argued that "The nature of Smart's madness is impossible to diagnose at this distance in time" and then argued that:

since Battie himself pronounced him uncured, he must have been subject to hallucinations. Strong drink, taken often enough and in sufficient quantity, will have that effect, of course, but Battie, distinguishing between 'original' and 'consequential' madness ... would allow only that excessive drinking could 'become a very common, tho' remoter cause of Madness.' Others differed: John Ball in his Modern Practice of Physic, 1760, lists 'anxiety of mind' and too much 'strong vinous or spirituous liquors' as 'antecedent causes' of madness. Smart's mania, however it manifested itself, and it usually manifested itself in loud public prayer, did not stem from drunkenness; it was aggravated, however, by frequent recourse to the bottle. Ironically enough, as Mrs. Piozzi recognised, if Smart had prayed in the privacy of his home, all might have been well for him.

The possible religious component of Smart's condition was taken up by 20th-century critics as an explanation for why the 18th century saw Smart as mad. Laurence Binyon, in 1934, believed that religion played a major role in how society viewed Smart: "Smart's madness seems to have taken the form of a literal interpretation of the injunction Pray without ceasing. He embarrassed visitors by insisting on their joining him in his supplications ... Obsession with a fixed idea is a common form of insanity. But such obsessions are a mental imprisonment; whereas the Song is unmistakably the expression of a great release." Binyon's idea was picked up by Sophia Blaydes, in 1966, who pointed out that society was prejudiced against those who experienced enthusiasm, a strong spiritual connection to God. It was against religious prejudice that she argued,

The cause of Smart's eclipse may be traced in part to a prejudice of the age, one which was founded in reason but developed in fear. There was one inescapable fact which hampered any clear perception of Smart's work—he had been confined for madness. It was easier to use a difficult allusion or unusual image as evidence of madness than to interpret it. What could cause a fundamentally rational group of people to react so irrationally? To some degree, it was the fear of 'enthusiasm'.

In the 18th century, as Blaydes continued, the word changed from possessed by god to inspired to falsely inspired. The result of this change was that British society viewed enthusiasm as the enemy to both reason and social order. Thus, "Smart, the hack-writer, would not have been greeted by a hostile audience, but Smart, the enthusiast, would have been condemned immediately. The result would be obvious: his past work, previously lauded, would be ignored, and his future work would receive immediate condemnation. such was the history of Smart's contemporary reputation." In determining if Smart was really mad or not, Blaydes concluded, "in Smart's day, any sign of enthusiasm would have been cause for the judgment of madness ... Two accounts of Smart and the nature of his madness have been preserved for us. Each permits some doubt that the poet was mad and could be regarded so in any age."

Frances Anderson, in 1974 characterised Smart's "illness" as insanity and obsession, but believed that "Smart's madness consisted of his efforts to obey literally St Paul's injunction to the Thessalonians: 'Pray without ceasing.'" During his episodes of illness, as Anderson continued, Smart "probably suffered some periods of delirium" but also "appeared to know what he was doing". Smart's actions were similar to 18th-century Methodists that were "addicted to public prayer with what was thought to be overly charged high spirits. Such displayers of religious emotionalism were often confined not only to private madhouses, but also to Bedlam". Later, in 1998, Charles Rosen pointed out that "The Enlightenment condemned religious enthusiasm as appropriate for the uneducated and the great unwashed" and "it is understandable that the only original and vital religious poetry between 1760 and 1840 should have been written by poets considered genuinely mad by their contemporaries: Smart, Blake, and Hölderlin."

Accounts at the end of the 20th century focused on the effects of Smart's confinement. Clement Hawes, following Michel Foucault's interpretation of the 18th century that there was an "'animality' of madness", believed that Smart emotionally connected with animals because of the "medical stigmatization" he felt at the hands of his fellow man. Chris Mounsey, agreeing with Hawes's interpretation, believed that Smart's treatment was "a bestializing process and had taught him to hold his tongue and sit out his time as quietly as possible." Contrary to the bestialisation, Allan Ingram argued that Jubilate Agno was "a poetic phenomenon that would have demolished contemporary poetic orthodoxies had it been publishable. The mad individual presented a gross distortion of the human form that nevertheless insisted on remaining human, but mad language could be even more disturbing."
