= Sam Weber =

American stand-up comedian and audio engineer

- Born: United States

Comedy career
- Years active: 2010-present
- Medium: Stand-up comedy
- Subjects: music, observational comedy, politics, pop culture

Sam Weber is a stand-up comedian, musician, and audio engineer from Santa Cruz, California.

== Early life ==
In high school, Weber began performing at the BrainWash in San Franscisco, before moving to Santa Cruz to study film and electronic music at UC Santa Cruz.

== Professional Career ==
The Santa Cruz Sentinel described Weber in a 2019 cover story as a "Comic on the Move," and the Good Times listed him in the "Best of" category for stand-up in 2020 and 2022.

During the pandemic, he hosted a weekly drive-in comedy show in a public parking lot using an FM-transmitter powered by his car.

He has produced comedy records for several artists, including Dave Burleigh, and Joe Sib of the band Wax. He has also released several musical projects, and appeared in multiple independent films.
