= Siobhan Carroll =

Canadian writer and professor of English

- Born: 1980 (age 45–46)
- Education: Indiana University Bloomington (PhD)
- Occupations: Writer; professor
- Writing career
- Genres: speculative fiction, non-fiction
- Website: voncarr-siobhan-carroll.blogspot.com

Siobhan Carroll (born 1980) is a Canadian writer and professor of English at University of Delaware. She specializes in British literature from 1750 to 1850.

== Early years ==
Carroll was raised in Vancouver and moved to the United States in 2005, where she received her Ph.D. in English from Indiana University at Bloomington. In 2008 she joined the faculty at University of Delaware. She published her first short story at age 20.

== Career ==
Carroll is a humanities scholar and as a professor, specializes in British literature from 1750 to 1850. She teaches British Literature, Literature and Drama, Cultural Studies, Transatlantic/Transnational Studies, Environmental Humanities, Creative Writing and American Literature.

In 2015, Carroll released a nonfiction text titled An Empire of Air and Water: Uncolonizable Space in the British Imagination, 1750-1850 (University of Pennsylvania Press, 2015), which describes the relationship between science, literature and exploration in the expansion of the British Empire. She is also the author of essays, reviews and peer-reviewed articles.

Carroll has published a number of short stories in magazines including Asimov's, Lightspeed and Beneath Ceaseless Skies. In 2020, her fantasy novelette from Tor.com For He Can Creep won the 2020 Eugie Award, and was a finalist for the Nebula Award for Best Novelette in 2019, the 2020 Hugo Award for Best Novelette, and the 2020 World Fantasy Award—Short Fiction. For He Can Creep was adapted by Tamsyn Muir for the fourth volume of Love, Death & Robots, released on Netflix in 2025.

In 2016, Carroll was recipient of a fellowship grant from the Delaware Division of the Arts. She has taught at Clarion West.

== Personal life ==
Carroll is married and lives in Philadelphia.
