= The Margarets =

Norwegian musical group

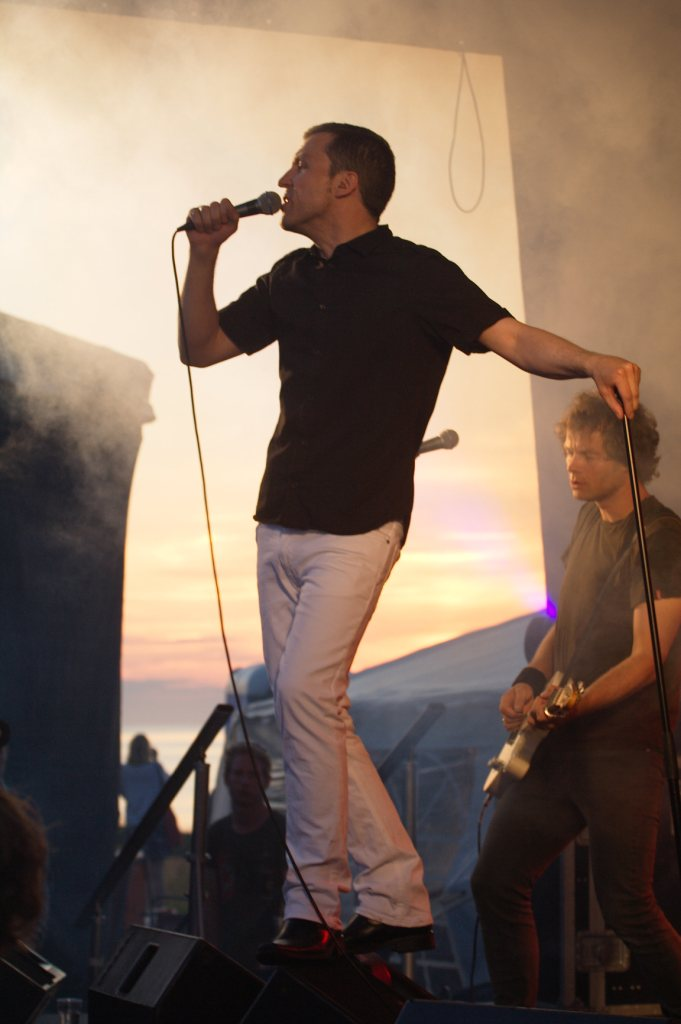
- The Margarets in concert at Giske

Background information
- Origin: Giske Municipality, Norway
- Genres: Alternative rock, pop
- Years active: 1991-1995; 1999-2011
- Past members: Alex Rinde; Rune Berg; Ante Rune Giskeødegård; Ronnie Michael André Giskegjerde Larsen; Kai Valderhaug; Lars Berg

The Margarets were a Norwegian pop band hailing from the island Giske near Ålesund. The band was founded in 1991 by Rune Berg (guitarist and songwriter) and Alex Rinde (vocals). The band was named after their local postwoman, Margaret. Eventually Berg and Rinde included Ante Rune Giskeødegård, Ronnie Michael André Giskegjerde Larsen and Kai Valderhaug in the line-up, and the band played together for about four years before the members were scattered due to education and illness..

The band reformed in Oslo in 1999, when all the members except bass player Valderhaug were living in Oslo. The band went by the name Jupiter Starfish before they changed the band name back to The Margarets after a few months. Lars Berg had joined the band as bass player and in March 2001 the band reached the Norwegian music charts with the song "Rubber Rubbish". Their debut album What Kept You? from 2002 immediately reached second place on the Norwegian music charts. The debut album sold more than 30 000 copies. The songs on The Margarets' debut album were written about ten years before the album was released, hence the title of the album.

In 2005 their second album Love Will Haunt You Down was released, reached fifth place on Norwegian music charts and sold well.

Several bands from Manchester such as The Smiths, Joy Division and The Stone Roses influenced The Margarets. In 2007 the band went on a tour in the UK and played at the In the City music festival in Manchester to great reviews. BBC nominated The Margarets as one of their top seven favourites and Manchester Evening News nominated them as one of the six best bands at In the City 2007. The Margarets were also featured on Xfm (Manchester) performing a live session for Clint Boon.

During 2008 The Margarets released two full-length studio albums recorded at Ocean Sound Recordings at Giske: Twenty Years Erased, released on 21 January 2008 and Look For Love, released on 24 November 2008.

In 2009 The Margarets were nominated for Spellemannsprisen of 2008 for their album Twenty Years Erased in the pop band category.

When the Wind Calls Your Name is a Zeitgeist Special Edition documentary film on The Margarets filmed, produced and directed by Paul Barron and released in 2007.

The band officially dissolved in 2011.

== Members ==
- Rune Berg: guitar, songwriter (1991–2011)
- Alex Rinde: vocals, drums, lyricist (1991–2011)
- Ante Rune Giskeødegård: rhythm guitar (1991–2011)
- Ronnie Michael André Giskegjerde Larsen: percussion (1991–2011)
- Kai Valderhaug: bass (1991–1995)
- Lars Berg: bass (1999–2011)

== Discography ==
=== Studio albums ===
Title	Album details	Peak chart positions
Title	Album details	NOR
What Kept You?	Released: 2002; Label: Universal (#017 025); Formats: LP, CD	2
Love Will Haunt You Down	Released: 2005; Label: Universal (#987 074); Formats: CD	4
Twenty Years Erased	Released: 2008; Label: Division (#DIVREC009); Formats: CD	7
Look For Love	Released: 2008; Label: Division (#DIVREC010); Formats: CD	—
"—" denotes items that did not chart or were not released in that territory.

=== Singles ===
- «Alain Delon»/«Rubber Rubbish» (2001)
- «Spoonful of Love»
- «Sound of Summer»
- «Surf Alone» (2005)
- «She Caught the Last Bus Home» (2005)
- «Oh! Pretty Woman» (2006)
