= Tamsyn Muir =

New Zealand writer (born 1985)

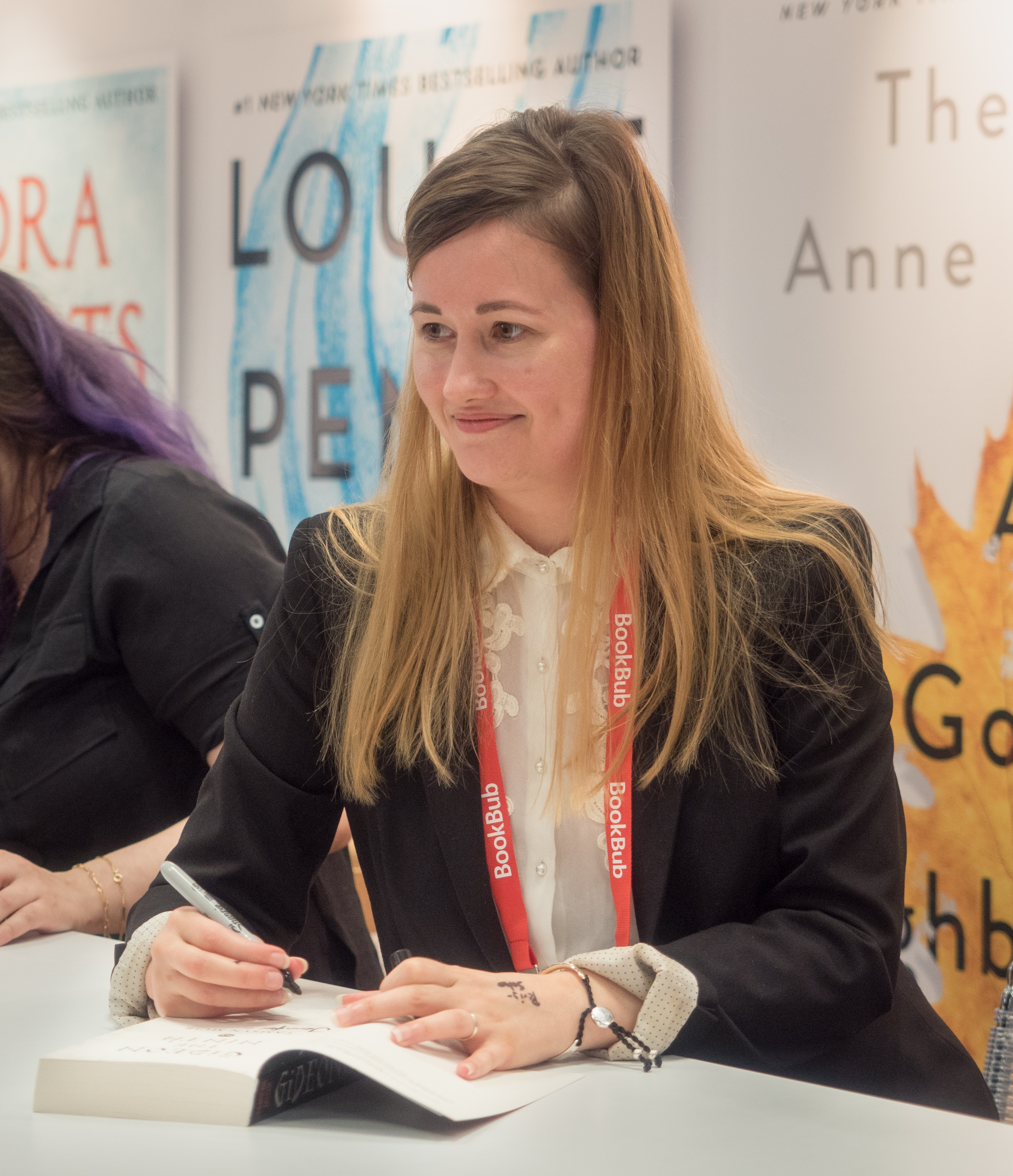
- Born: Tamsyn Elizabeth Muir; 14 March 1985 (age 41); New South Wales, Australia
- Occupation: Author
- Writing career
- Years active: 2011–present
- Genres: Fantasy, science fiction, horror
- Notable work: The Locked Tomb series
- Website: tamsynmuir.com

Tamsyn Elizabeth Muir (born 14 March 1985) is a New Zealand fantasy, science fiction, and horror author best known for The Locked Tomb, a science fantasy series of novels. Muir won the 2020 Locus Award for her first novel, Gideon the Ninth, and has been nominated for several other awards as well.

== Biography ==
Muir was born March 14, 1985, in New South Wales, Australia. Her family moved to New Zealand when she was nine months old, so Muir grew up in Howick, New Zealand. In 2010, she earned a degree in education. She is also a 2010 graduate of the Clarion Workshop. She currently lives and works in Oxford, United Kingdom.

== Work ==
Muir's short story "The Deepwater Bride", published in The Magazine of Fantasy & Science Fiction in 2015, was nominated for the Nebula Award for Best Novelette, the World Fantasy Award—Short Fiction, the Eugie Award, and the Shirley Jackson Award for best novelette.

Gideon the Ninth, Muir's first novel and the first book of The Locked Tomb series, was published in 2019. It was awarded the 2020 Locus Award for Best First Novel and the 2020 Crawford Award, presented annually by the International Association for the Fantastic in the Arts. It was nominated for the Nebula Award for Best Novel and the Hugo Award for Best Novel. It finished third in the Goodreads Choice Awards for best science fiction in 2019.

The second book in The Locked Tomb, Harrow the Ninth, was published in August 2020, and was a finalist for the 2021 Hugo Award for Best Novel. It was followed by Nona the Ninth, a surprise addition to the planned trilogy of Gideon the Ninth, Harrow the Ninth, and Alecto the Ninth, in 2022. Alecto the Ninth, now the series' fourth instalment, was initially announced for release in 2023, but a cover and release date have not been revealed.

Muir's fantasy novella Princess Floralinda and the Forty-Flight Tower was published in July 2020. It received a starred review from Publishers Weekly. Muir spoke several times about the sequel, which was to be titled Queen Floralinda Takes Her Throne. In October 2026, Cosmopolitan published the cover reveal for Princess Floralinda, which will combine both her original novella and the intended sequel into a single book, to be released on July 27, 2027 by Tor. It will be her first published novel outside the Locked Tomb series.

Muir wrote the teleplay for the twelfth episode of Secret Level, based on the video game Spelunky, which aired in 2024. She adapted Siobhan Carroll's short story For He Can Creep into the tenth episode of the fourth volume of Love, Death & Robots, which aired in 2025.

In 2020, Muir announced that after completing The Locked Tomb Tor would be publishing her cyberpunk western novella trilogy, beginning with Go Marching In.

== Awards and honors ==
Awards for Muir's writing
Year	Work	Award	Category	Result	Ref
2012	"The Magician's Apprentice"	Shirley Jackson Award	Short Fiction	Nominated	
2015	"The Deepwater Bride"	Nebula Award	Novelette	Nominated	
2015	"The Deepwater Bride"	Shirley Jackson Award	Novelette	Nominated	
2016	"The Deepwater Bride"	Eugie Award	—	Finalist	
2016	"The Deepwater Bride"	World Fantasy Award	Short Fiction	Nominated	
2019	Gideon the Ninth	Amazon Best of 2019	SF & Fantasy	Won	
2019	Gideon the Ninth	Audible Best of 2019	Fantasy	Nominated	
2019	Gideon the Ninth	Book Riot Best Books of 2019	—	Listed	
2019	Gideon the Ninth	Nebula Award	Novel	Nominated	
2019	Gideon the Ninth	New York Public Library Best Books of 2019	—	Listed	
2019	Gideon the Ninth	NPR Best Books of the Year	—	Listed	
2019	Gideon the Ninth	Paste 19 Best Novels of 2019	—	Listed	
2019	Gideon the Ninth	Polygon Best SF & Fantasy Books of 2019	—	Listed	
2019	Gideon the Ninth	Shelf Awareness Best Books of 2019	—	Listed	
2019	Gideon the Ninth	Vox Best Books of the Year	—	Listed	
2020	Gideon the Ninth	British Fantasy Award	Best Newcomer	Shortlisted	
2020	Gideon the Ninth	Chesley Award	Best Hardcover Illustration	Nominated	
2020	Gideon the Ninth	Crawford Award	—	Won	
2020	Gideon the Ninth	Dragon Award	Science Fiction Novel	Nominated	
2020	Gideon the Ninth	Hugo Award	Novel	Finalist	
2020	Gideon the Ninth	Locus Award	First Novel	Won	
2020	Gideon the Ninth	RUSA CODES Reading List	Science Fiction	Shortlisted	
2020	Gideon the Ninth	World Fantasy Award	Novel	Nominated	
2020	Harrow the Ninth	Amazon Best of 2020	SF & Fantasy	Listed	
2021	Harrow the Ninth	Chesley Award	Best Hardcover Illustration	Nominated	
2021	Harrow the Ninth	Hugo Award	Novel	Finalist	
2021	Harrow the Ninth	Locus Award	Fantasy Novel	Finalist	
2021	The Locked Tomb	Amazing Audiobooks for Young Adults	—	Listed	
2021	The Locked Tomb	NPR Best Books of the Past Decade	—	Listed	
2022	Gideon the Ninth	Premio Ignotus	Foreign Novel	Won	
2022	Nona the Ninth	Audible Best of 2022	Science Fiction	Listed	
2022	Nona the Ninth	Kirkus Reviews Best of 2022	SF & Fantasy	Listed	
2022	Nona the Ninth	Nebula Award	Novel	Nominated	
2022	Princess Floralinda and the Forty-Flight Tower	Audie Award	Fantasy	Nominated	
2023	The Locked Tomb	Hugo Award	Series	Finalist	
2023	Nona the Ninth	Hugo Award	Novel	Finalist	
2023	Nona the Ninth	Locus Award	Fantasy Novel	Finalist	
2023	Nona the Ninth	Premio Ignotus	Foreign Novel	Won	

== Publications ==
=== Novels ===
==== The Locked Tomb ====
1. —— (2019). Gideon the Ninth. Tor Books. ISBN 978-1250313195.
2. —— (2020). Harrow the Ninth. Tor Books. ISBN 978-1250313225.
3. —— (2022). Nona the Ninth. Tor Books. ISBN 978-1250854117.
4. ——. Alecto the Ninth. Tor Books.
- —— (2027). Princess Floralinda. Tor Books. ISBN 9781250479631.

===== Related short stories =====
- 0.5 —— (2020). "The Mysterious Study of Doctor Sex". Tor.
- 2.5 —— (2021). "As Yet Unsent". Harrow the Ninth (trade paperback reprint ed.). ISBN 978-1250313218.
- 3.5 —— (2023). "The Unwanted Guest". Nona the Ninth (trade paperback ed.). ISBN 978-1250899132.

===== Related Essays =====
- —— (2020). "A Little Explanation on Naming Systems". Gideon the Ninth (trade paperback reprint ed.). ISBN 978-1250313188.

=== Novellas ===
- —— (2020). Princess Floralinda and the Forty-Flight Tower. Subterranean Press. ISBN 978-1596069923.

=== Short stories ===
Year	Title	First published	Reprints	Ref
2011	"The House That Made the Sixteen Loops of Time"	"The House That Made the Sixteen Loops of Time". Fantasy Magazine (47). February 2011.		
2012	"The Magician's Apprentice"	"The Magician's Apprentice". Weird Tales. 66.3 (359): 36–38. Winter 2012.	"The Magician's Apprentice". Lightspeed Magazine (88). September 2017.	
2013	"Chew"	"Chew". Nightmare Magazine (4). January 2013.		
2015	"The Woman in the Hill"	"The Woman in the Hill". Dreams from the Witch House: Female Voices of Lovecraftian Horror. 2015.	"The Woman in the Hill". Nightmare Magazine (63). December 2017.	
2015	"The Deepwater Bride"	"The Deepwater Bride". F&SF. 129 (1&2): 8–31. July–August 2015.		
2015	"Union"	"Union". Clarkesworld (111): 20–32. December 2015.		
2020	"The Mysterious Study of Doctor Sex"	"The Mysterious Study of Doctor Sex". Tor. 29 July 2020.		
2022	"As Yet Unsent"	"As Yet Unsent". Harrow the Ninth. 2021.	"As Yet Unsent". Tor. 8 June 2022.	
2022	"Undercover"	"Undercover". Amazon Original Stories. 15 November 2022.		
2023	"The Unwanted Guest"	"The Unwanted Guest". Nona the Ninth. 2023.	"The Unwanted Guest." Reactor. 18 September 2024.	

=== Comics ===
- Apothecia (written by Muir, drawn by Shelby Cragg) (2014)

=== Teleplays ===
Year	Title	Credit	Ref
2024	Secret Level	episode "Spelunky: Tally", Short Story By	
2025	Love, Death & Robots	episode "For He Can Creep"	
