= Stephan Martinière =

French artist

- Born: May 3, 1962 (age 62); Paris, France
- Known for: Science fiction, fantasy artist
- Website: martiniere.com

Stephan Martinière (born May 3, 1962) is a French science fiction and fantasy artist as well as cartoonist, concept illustrator and art director.

== Biography ==
Martinière was born 3 May 1962 in Paris, France. He attended high school at Chambre De Commerce Les Gobelins, one of the most renowned art schools in Paris. After art school he attended animation school, but halfway through he was hired by DIC Entertainment and moved to Japan to work on Inspector Gadget.

After settling in California, Stephan continued as animation director for DIC Entertainment, and directed hundreds of episodes of Where's Waldo and Dennis the Menace. His 5 half-hour musical specials for the show Madeline were nominated for an Emmy, and went on to win the Children's Hall of Fame Humanitas, A.C.T., and the Parents' Choice Award. Stephan also drew the Where's Waldo Sunday syndicated strip for 1994-1997.

His animation work lead him to Hollywood, where he designed for feature films such as Virus, The Astronaut's Wife, Red Planet, and I, Robot.

Stephan has also contributed concept designs for theme park rides. His clients have included Universal Studios (Jurassic Park ride), Paramount (Star Trek ride), Landmark and Rhythm & Hues.

He moved from Los Angeles, CA to Spokane, WA to work for Cyan Worlds on Uru: Ages Beyond Myst from 2001 to 2004, and then moved to Chicago to work for Midway Games on Stranglehold from 2004 to 2007. He is currently employed by Cyan Worlds once again, assisting in the development of the upcoming video game, Obduction.

Martinière has illustrated cards for the Magic: The Gathering collectible card game.

As of 2008, Martinière resides in Dallas, Texas, and works at id Software on Rage.

== Works ==
=== Book covers ===
- The American Zone, by L. Neil Smith (2001)
- Crossover: A Cassandra Kresnov Novel, by Joel Shepherd (2001)
- Heavy Planet, by Hal Clement (2002)
- Hitting the Skids in Pixeltown: The Phobos Science Fiction Anthology, Volume 2 (published by Phobos, edited by Orson Scott Card) (2003)
- Newton's Wake: A Space Opera, by Ken MacLeod (2004)
- Building Harlequin's Moon, by Larry Niven (2005)
- Elantris, by Brandon Sanderson (2005)
- Fleet of Worlds by Larry Niven and Edward M. Lerner (2007)
- Juggler of Worlds by Larry Niven and Edward M. Lerner (2008)
- Destroyer of Worlds by Larry Niven and Edward M. Lerner (2009)
- Betrayer of Worlds by Larry Niven and Edward M. Lerner (2010)
- Out of the Dark by David Weber (2010)
- Fate of Worlds by Larry Niven and Edward M. Lerner (2012)

=== Concept designs (live action) ===
- The Astronaut's Wife
- Battlefield Earth
- Dragonheart 2
- The Fifth Element
- Flubber
- I, Robot
- Phoenix Rising (a revival of the Captain Power television series currently under development)

== Honors ==
- British Science Fiction Association Award
  - Winner, Best Cover of 2004
  - Nominated, Best Cover of 2005
  - Winner, Best Cover of 2009
- Chesley Award
  - Winner, Best Cover Illustration, Hardcover (2006)
  - Winner, Best Cover Illustration, Hardcover (2007)
- Hugo Award for Best Professional Artist
  - Nominated, Best Professional Artist (2006)
  - Nominated, Best Professional Artist (2007)
  - Winner, Best Professional Artist (2008)
  - Nominated, Best Professional Artist (2010)
- Locus Award
  - Nominated, Artist (2006)
  - Nominated, Artist (2007)
  - Nominated, Artist (2008)
  - Nominated, Artist (2009)
  - Nominated, Artist (2010)
- Spectrum Award
  - Winner, Advertising Category, Silver Award (1997)
  - Winner, Comics Category, Gold Award (2004)
  - Winner, Book Category, Silver Award (2008),
- A Thea Award for his work on the Paramount theme park Super Saturator in 2001.
- World Fantasy Award
  - Nominated, Artist 2008
  - Nominated, Artist 2009
- The Grand Master Award from Ballistic Media's Expose 4
- Four Master Awards and nine Excellence Expose Awards from Ballistic Media,

As a director for the animated special "Madeline," he won the Humanitas Award, the A.C.T Award and the Parent's Choice Award and was nominated for an Emmy Award.
