= The Locked Tomb =

Science fantasy book series

- Gideon the Ninth (2019); Harrow the Ninth (2020); Nona the Ninth (2022); Alecto the Ninth (TBD)
- Author: Tamsyn Muir
- Country: New Zealand
- Language: English
- Publisher: Tor Books
- Published: 10 September 2019 – present
- No. of books: 3

The Locked Tomb is a series of science fantasy novels by New Zealand author Tamsyn Muir. It is published by Tor Books.

== Publishing history ==
=== Novels ===
#	Title	Pages	Release date	Ref.
1	Gideon the Ninth	448	September 10, 2019	
2	Harrow the Ninth	512	August 4, 2020	
3	Nona the Ninth	480	September 13, 2022	
4	Alecto the Ninth		TBD	

=== Short fiction ===
Muir has published four works of short fiction that fill in the gaps between the novels. The first of these short stories, "The Mysterious Study of Doctor Sex" (2020), is set a few years prior to Gideon the Ninth and focuses on Palamedes and Camilla. "As Yet Unsent" (2022), an epistolary story from the point of view of Captain Deuteros, takes place between the events of Harrow the Ninth and Nona the Ninth. Both were published on Tor.com. Both "As Yet Unsent" and the short story "Blood of Eden Memorandum for Record" were also included with paperback and e-book editions of Harrow the Ninth. "The Unwanted Guest" was included in the paperback version of Nona the Ninth, and takes place during the events of Nona the Ninth, and is told in the form of a one-act play.

== Main characters ==
- Gideon Nav
- Harrowhark Nonagesimus
- Ianthe Tridentarius
- John Gaius
- Camilla Hect
- Palamedes Sextus
- Nona

== Reception ==
=== Critical response ===
The series has been well received by critics, with praise for its handling of fantasy, horror, gothic, and science fiction genres, prose, and characterization. The series' handling of lesbian themes has also been praised.

Nona the Ninth received mixed reviews. Constance Grady of Vox praised its plot and additions to the lore of the series, while Linda Codega of Gizmodo felt that the novel was slow-moving and lacked a "payoff".
