= William Force Stead =

American diplomat and poet

William Force Stead (29 August 1884 – 8 March 1967) was an American diplomat and poet. He became an Anglican clergyman, and chaplain of Worcester College, Oxford, from 1927 to 1930. He is best known for his editorial work on Christopher Smart.

== Biography ==
Stead was born in Washington, D.C. and educated at the University of Virginia. He left the U.S. consular service around 1917 and was a student at Queen's College, Oxford, publishing verses in Oxford poetry. He was ordained and spent time in Italy, before returning to Oxford and Worcester College as a Fellow.

Stead was a friend of T. S. Eliot, and close to him at the time of his 1927 religious conversion, baptising him in the Church of England. He returned to an academic position in the US in 1939, and died in Baltimore.

== Works ==
- Moonflowers (1909)
- Windflowers (1911)
- Holy Innocents (1917)
- Verd Antique (1920)
- The Sweet Miracle (1922)
- Wayfaring (1924)
- Uriel: A Hymn in Praise of Divine Immanence (1933)
- The Poetry of the Bible (1938) editor
- Rejoice in the Lamb: a song from Bedlam by Christopher Smart (1939) editor

== See also ==
- Peter Force
