= Moira Quirk =

British actress

- Education: Royal Central School of Speech and Drama
- Occupations: Actress; comedian
- Years active: 1992–present
- Agent: Arlene Thornton and Associates
- Spouse: Michael Rayner (m. 1996)
- Children: 2
- Website: moiraquirk.com

Moira Quirk is a British actress and comedian. As an audiobook narrator, she has won four Audie Awards.

== Personal life and education ==
Quirk received an honours degree in English and Drama from Westfield College, University of London and Central School of Speech and Drama. After graduation, she moved to the United States, settling in Orlando, Florida.

Quirk married comedian Michael Rayner on May 26, 1996. The couple moved to Los Angeles in the late 1990s. They have two daughters.

== Career ==
Early in her career, Quirk took voice acting lessons from Susan Blu and Charlie Adler.

After graduating from Westfield College, University of London and Central School of Speech and Drama, Quirk moved to Orlando, Florida, where she worked at Walt Disney World and Universal Studios Florida. Through this work, she became connected with Nickelodeon Studios. There, she became co-host and referee for Nickelodeon Guts for four seasons. She was also the hostess of the children's TV series Angelina Ballerina: The Next Steps.

Quirk is also known as the voice of Brit Crust in the Nickelodeon animated series My Life as a Teenage Robot, as well as the voice of CHIPS in The Radio Adventures of Dr. Floyd. Quirk also appeared in the game Mercenaries: Playground of Destruction, as the voice of the news reporter Adriana Livingston. She also voiced Daniella in the video game Haunting Ground, as well as Susie Smythe and Mei Ling on two episodes of What's New, Scooby-Doo?.

Quirk has additionally voiced several minor characters on popular animated series, such as Codename: Kids Next Door and Johnny Bravo.

She has voiced the character Karliah in the role-playing video game The Elder Scrolls V: Skyrim, as well as Elara Dorne in BioWare's MMORPG, Star Wars: The Old Republic, Elhaym "Elly" van Houten in Xenogears, and Moira Vahlen in XCOM: Enemy Unknown and its expansion, Enemy Within. Quirk has also appeared in The Bard's Tale, and provides the voices of The Emissary of the Nine, Elisabeth Bray in Destiny 2, Tidepool in Skylanders: Imaginators, and some female extras in Destiny 2: Beyond Light. She voiced Vipsania and other characters in the 2005 Capcom game Shadow of Rome.

She also voiced Phyla-Vell on The Avengers: Earth's Mightiest Heroes and Hannahr in DreamWorks Dragons: Rescue Riders.

== Awards and honors ==
| Year | Title | Award/Honor | Result | Ref. |
|---|---|---|---|---|
| 2005 | Mercury by Ben Bova | Listen Up Award for Science Fiction/Fantasy | Finalist | |
| 2006 | Rosie Dunne by Cecelia Ahern | Audie Award for Romance | Finalist | |
| 2008 | Sweeney Todd and the String of Pearls by Yuri Rasovsky | Audie Award for Audio Drama | Winner | |
| 2008 | Sweeney Todd and the String of Pearls by Yuri Rasovsky | Audie Award for Achievement in Production | Winner | |
| 2008 | Sweeney Todd and the String of Pearls by Yuri Rasovsky | Audie Award for Original Work | Winner | |
| 2014 | Etiquette & Espionage (2013) by Gail Carriger | Amazing Audiobooks for Young Adults | Top 10 | |
| 2015 | Anne Manx and the Blood Chase by Larry Weiner | Audie Award for Audio Drama | Finalist | |
| 2015 | Curtsies and Conspiracies by Gail Carriger | Audie Award for Teens | Finalist | |
| 2015 | The Hound of the Baskervilles (1902) by Sir Arthur Conan Doyle, adapted by David Pichette and R. Hamilton Wright | Audie Award for Audio Drama | Winner | |
| 2019 | Gideon the Ninth (2019) by Tamsyn Muir | AudioFile Best of Sci-Fi, Fantasy & Horror | Selection | |
| 2019 | The Lady's Guide to Petticoats and Piracy by Mackenzi Lee | Audie Award for Young Adult Title | Finalist | |
| 2021 | The Bone Houses (2019) by Emily Lloyd-Jones | Amazing Audiobooks for Young Adults | Selection | |
| 2021 | The Locked Tomb by Tamsyn Muir | Amazing Audiobooks for Young Adults | Selection | |
| 2021 | Perks of Loving a Wallflower | AudioFile Best of Romance | Selection | |
| 2022 | Princess Floralinda and the Forty-Flight Tower by Tamsyn Muir | Audie Award for Fantasy | Finalist | |
| 2022 | Sixteen Scandals by Sophie Jordan | Amazing Audiobooks for Young Adults | Selection | |

== Filmography ==
=== Film ===
| Year | Title | Role |
|---|---|---|
| 1995 | Play It Again, Dad | Interviewer |
| 1998 | Suicide, the Comedy | Maggie |
| 2002 | The Wild Thornberrys Movie | Jane |
| 2004 | Steamboy | Cliff, Tommy |
| 2005 | Come as You Are | Suzie |

=== Television ===
| Year | Title | Role | Notes |
|---|---|---|---|
| 1992–1995 | Nickelodeon Guts | Co-Host, Referee (as herself) | 160 episodes |
| 1998 | Hey Arnold! | Woman, Kid | Episode: "Career Day" |
| 1997–2004 | Johnny Bravo | Various voices | 3 episodes |
| 1998 | Hyperion Bay | Minnie | Episode: "Temptation and Responsibility" |
| 1998 | Oh Yeah! Cartoons | Brangwen | Episode: "Enchanted Adventures" |
| 2001 | The Wild Thornberrys | Emu | Episode: "Operation Valentine" |
| 2003–2006 | My Life as a Teenage Robot | Brit, various voices | 13 episodes |
| 2004–2005 | What's New, Scooby-Doo? | Mei Ling, Susie Smythe | 2 episodes |
| 2005 | Stroker & Hoop | Khan'ja, Dora, Theatergoer | Episode: "The Wrath of Khan'Ja" |
| 2012 | The Avengers: Earth's Mightiest Heroes | Phyla-Vell / Quasar | Episode: "Michael Korvac" |
| 2016 | Sanjay and Craig | Mo | Episode: "G.U.T.S. Busters" |
| 2019–2022 | DreamWorks Dragons: Rescue Riders | Hannahr | Recurring role |

=== Video games ===
| Year | Title | Role | Notes | Source |
|---|---|---|---|---|
| 1994 | Nickelodeon Guts | | | |
| 1998 | Xenogears | Ellyham "Elly" van Houten | | |
| 2004 | The Bard's Tale | | | |
| 2005 | Mercenaries: Playground of Destruction | Adriana Livingston | | |
| 2005 | Shadow of Rome | Vipsania | | |
| 2005 | Haunting Ground | Daniella, Ayla Belli | | |
| 2011 | MotorStorm: Apocalypse | Candi, Rival | | |
| 2011 | The Elder Scrolls V: Skyrim | Karliah | | |
| 2011 | Star Wars: The Old Republic | Elara Dorne | | |
| 2012 | Dragon's Dogma | Mercedes | | |
| 2016 | Skylanders: Imaginators | Tidepool | | |
| 2020 | Destiny 2: Beyond Light | Exo Stranger, Elsie Bray | | |
| 2023 | Hogwarts Legacy | Professor Garlick, additional voices | | |
