= Django Wexler =

American fantasy writer

- Born: 13 January 1981 (age 45); San Francisco, California, United States of America
- Occupation: Author
- Spouse: Casey Blair
- Children: 1
- Writing career
- Genres: Fantasy, Flintlock Fantasy
- Notable work: The Shadow Campaigns
- Website: djangowexler.com

Nicholas Django Wexler is an American fantasy author. He has published the "flintlock fantasy" series The Shadow Campaigns (2013–2018), the middle-grade Forbidden Library fantasy series, the darkly comedic timeloop fantasy Dark Lord Davi series and other works. He currently resides near Seattle, Washington, with his wife and fellow author Casey Blair and their daughter (born 2022).

== Life and career ==
Wexler obtained degrees in creative writing and computer science from Carnegie Mellon University in Pittsburgh, and engaged in post-graduate artificial intelligence research at the university. He later worked as a programmer and writer for Microsoft in Seattle before turning to writing fiction full-time.

== Summary ==
=== The Shadow Campaigns ===
Wexler's epic fantasy series The Shadow Campaigns is set in a world resembling Europe and North Africa during the Napoleonic era. It mainly follows three soldiers of the kingdom of Vordan – Count Janus bet Vhalnich, a character patterned after Napoleon, Marcus d'Ivoire, a seasoned infantry commander posted to a backward colony, and Winter Ihernglass, a young woman who disguised herself as a man to be able to enlist. As they struggle through Vordan's equivalents of the French Revolution and the attendant wars, they also face a supernatural threat in the form of conspiracies fighting for control of the rare remnants of magic still existing in the world.

The Shadow Throne, the second book in the series, was a Finalist for the 2015 Endeavour Award. The Price of Valor, the third book in the series, was a Finalist for both the 2016 Endeavour Award and the 2016 Dragon Award for Best Military Science Fiction or Fantasy Novel.

Wexler has advised that although not opposed to additional books in the Shadow Campaigns setting any additional books would be complicated by a change in publisher.

== Reviews ==
Reviewing the series for Tor.com, Stefan Raets described the first novel, The Thousand Names, as a "military fantasy full of spectacular battles" with a large and diverse cast, but criticized Winter's lack of agency.

The Shadow Throne was appreciated by Publishers Weekly as an "audacious and subversive sequel" and by Liz Bourke at Tor.com as an "immensely entertaining" novel that unlike other male-written fantasy, avoided the grimdark trend and featured a "central, significant, queer relationship between two women", but noted that Wexler relied much on coincidences to advance the plot. She also praised the third novel, The Price of Valour, for surpassing its predecessors as an "explosive, action-packed" epic fantasy novel with complex characterization and, again, a wide variety of female characters.

== Bibliography ==
=== Novels ===
==== The Shadow Campaigns series ====
1. The Thousand Names, 2013, Roc, ISBN 978-0-451-46510-8
2. The Shadow Throne, 2014, Roc, ISBN 978-0-451-41806-7. Finalist for the 2015 Endeavour Award
3. The Price of Valor, 2015, Del Rey, ISBN 978-0-091-95056-9. Finalist for both the 2016 Endeavour Award and the 2016 Dragon Award for Best Military Science Fiction or Fantasy Novel
4. The Guns of Empire, 2016, Ace, ISBN 978-0-451-47732-3
5. The Infernal Battalion, 2018, Ace, ISBN 978-0-451-47734-7

Novellas:

- "The Shadow of Elysium", 2015, InterMix, ISBN 978-0698197091

Short fiction:

- "The Penitent Damned", 2013, io9
- "The First Kill" published in "Blackguards: Tales of Assassins, Mercenaries, and Rogues", 2015, Ragnarok Publications, ISBN 978-1941987063

==== The Forbidden Library series ====
1. The Forbidden Library, 2014, Kathy Dawson Books, ISBN 978-0803739758
2. The Mad Apprentice, 2015, Kathy Dawson Books, ISBN 978-0803739765
3. The Palace of Glass, 2016, Kathy Dawson Books, ISBN 978-0803739789
4. The Fall of the Readers, 2017, Kathy Dawson Books, ISBN 978-0735227385

==== John Golden series ====
1. John Golden: Freelance Debugger, 2017, CreateSpace Independent Publishing Platform, ISBN 978-1547063451
2. John Golden & the Heroes of Mazaroth, 2017, CreateSpace Independent Publishing Platform, ISBN 978-1547063468

==== The Wells of Sorcery trilogy ====
1. Ship of Smoke and Steel, January 2019, Tor Teen, ISBN 978-0-7653-9724-9
2. City of Stone and Silence, January 2020, Tor Teen, ISBN 978-0765397270
3. Siege of Rage and Ruin, January 2021, Tor Teen, ISBN 978-0765397317

==== Magic: The Gathering fiction ====
- The Gathering Storm - released in 20 instalments, June–October 2019
- Sundered Bond (Kindle ebook). Wizards of the Coast. 2020.ISBN 978-0786967162

==== Burningblade and Silvereye series ====
1. Ashes of the Sun, 2020, Head of Zeus, ISBN 978-1788543149
2. Blood of the Chosen, 2021, Head of Zeus, ISBN 978-1788543224. Finalist for the 2022 Endeavour Award
3. Emperor of Ruin, 2023, Head of Zeus, ISBN 978-1801101424

==== Dungeons & Dragons fiction ====
- Dungeons & Dragons: Spelljammer: Memory's Wake, 2024, Random House, ISBN 978-0593723210

==== Dark Lord Davi series ====
1. How to Become the Dark Lord and Die Trying. Little, Brown Book Group. p. 387. ISBN 978-0356518985.
2. Everybody Wants To Rule The World Except Me, 2025, Orbit, ISBN 978-0316392402

==== The Diamond Knife series ====
1. Last Stop, 2024, Podium Publishing, ISBN 978-1039473188

==== Standalone works ====
- Memories of Empire, 2005, Medallion Press, ISBN 978-1932815146
- Shinigami, 2006, Medallion Press, ISBN 978-1932815719
- Netherwings, 2021, Audible Originals, ISBN 978-1799790037
- Hard Reboot, 2021, tordotcom, ISBN 978-1250790279
- Hoard, 2024, Newsletter exclusive
- The Thirteenth God, 2026, serialised on the Royal Road website and Patreon beginning on Django's birthday 13 January 2026

=== Short fiction ===
Stories (Note: Short stories unless otherwise noted.)

Title	Year	First published	Reprinted/collected	Notes
"Einstein Versus Satan"	1999	Aphelion webzine		
"The Changing of the Guard"	1999	Aphelion webzine		
"Darkness In Summertime"	2000	Aphelion webzine		
"Compassion"	2000	Aphelion webzine		
The End of the War	2015	Wexler, Django (June 2015). "The end of the war". Asimov's Science Fiction. 39 (6): 14–31.		Novelette. Placed second in the 2016 Asimov's Reader Poll
The Guns of the Wastes	2015	Wexler, Django (2015). "The Guns of the Wastes". In John Joseph Adams (ed.). Operation Arcana. Baen Books.		
REAL	2015	Wexler, Django (2015). "REAL". In Daniel H. Wilson and John Joseph Adams (ed.). Press Start to Play: Stories. Vintage.		
Magic Beans	2015	Wexler, Django (2015). "Magic Beans". In Victoria Pond (ed.). Coffee:Hot. Circlet Press.	Wexler, Django (2016). "Magic Beans". In Shawn Speakman (ed.). Unfettered II: New Tales By Masters of Fantasy. Grim Oak Press.	
Last of the Red Riders	2018	Wexler, Django (2018). "Last of the Red Riders". In Melanie R. Meadors (ed.). Hath No Fury. Outland Entertainment.	Wexler, Django (2022). "Last of the Red Riders". In Shawn Speakman (ed.). Unbound II: New Tales by Masters of Fantasy. Grim Oak Press.	
Amara Kel's Rules for TIE Pilot Survival (Probably)	2020	Wexler, Django (2020). "Amara Kel's Rules for TIE Pilot Survival (Probably)". The Empire Strikes Back : From a Certain Point of View. Del Rey.		
Rox’d	2020	Wexler, Django (2020). "Rox'd". In Noah K Sturdevant (ed.). Quick Draw!. Platinum Spork.		All profits from this anthology go to the True Colors United charity.
Plan Z	2020	Wexler, Django (2020). "Plan Z". In Janine A. Southard (ed.). Silk & Steel: A Queer Speculative Adventure Anthology. Cantina Publishing.		

———————
