= 3B =

3-B or 03b, may refer to:

3B or 3B may refer to:

- Third baseman
- Triple (baseball)
- 3B Computers, a range of computers produced by AT&T during the 1980s
- 3B Junior, a department of the Japanese entertainment company Stardust Promotion
- 3B Lab, a Japanese popular music group
- Three Bs, a designation for three well-known classical composers
- 3B, a very soft grade of pencil lead
- Big Beautiful Bill, a 2025 omnibus bill proposed by POTUS Donald Trump
- Tiendas 3B, a chain of discount stores in Mexico

03B may refer to:

- Cyclone 03B (2023), Indian Ocean tropical cyclonic storm
- Tropical Cyclone 03B (2007), Indian Ocean tropical cyclonic storm
- 2003 Severe Cyclonic Storm BOB 07 (03B), Indian Ocean tropical cyclonic storm
- 1999 Tropical Storm 03B, Indian Ocean tropical cyclonic storm
- 1995 Very Severe Cyclonic Storm BOB 06 (03B), Indian Ocean tropical cyclonic storm
- 1990 Deep Depression BOB 07/03B, Indian Ocean tropical depression
- 1988 Extremely Severe Cyclonic Storm Three (03B), Indian Ocean tropical cyclonic storm
- 1978 Extremely Severe Cyclonic Storm BOB 10 (03B), Indian Ocean tropical cyclonic storm
- 1975 Cyclone Three (03B), Indian Ocean tropical cyclonic storm
- 1974 Tropical Storm Three (03B), Indian Ocean tropical cyclonic storm
- 1971 Cyclonic Storm Three (03B), Indian Ocean tropical cyclonic storm
- 1967 Depression Three (03B), Indian Ocean tropical depression
- 1966 Depression Three (03B), Indian Ocean tropical depression
- 1965 Depression Three (03B), Indian Ocean tropical depression

3̅B̅ may refer to:

- S̅O̅S̅

== See also ==
- EB (disambiguation)
- B3 (disambiguation)
- BBB (disambiguation)
