= BBBB =

BBBB may refer to:

- Bill Bailey's Birdwatching Bonanza, a British television game show
- Big Bad Beetleborgs, an American television series aired from 1996 to 1998
- Big Brother's Big Brain, a live discussion program that aired in 2006 and 2007
- Blackboard Inc., NASDAQ symbol BBBB, a Washington, D.C. software company
- "Brick by Boring Brick", a song by the American band Paramore
- "Bling-Bang-Bang-Born, a song by Creepy Nuts
- "Bống Bống Bang Bang", a song by 365daband

== See also ==
- 4B (disambiguation)
- B4 (disambiguation)
- BBB (disambiguation)
- BB (disambiguation)
- B (disambiguation)
