= B4 =

B4, B04, B.IV or B-4 may refer to:

== Transportation ==
=== Aviation ===
- B4, IATA code of BeOnd, an airline based in Malé, Maldives
- B4, IATA code of B.A.C.H. Flugbetrieb, an Austrian charter airline (ICAO code BCF)
- B4, IATA code of Bankair, a US American charter airline (ICAO code BKA)
- B4, then-IATA code of Flyglobespan, a former British airline
- Auster B.4, 1951 British light transport aircraft with rear ramp
- Bensen B-4, Bensen Aircraft autogyro
- Bäumer B IV Sausewind, German 1920s sports aircraft
- Fokker B.IV, parent company's designation for American branch's F.11 seaplane
- Hawker B 4, Swedish designation for Hawker Hart biplane
- Keystone B-4, United States biplane bomber
- Lohner B.IV, an Austro-Hungarian World War 1 reconnaissance biplane
- Pilatus B-4, Swiss glider also designated PC-11.

=== Locomotives ===
- Alsace-Lorraine B 4, an Alsace-Lorraine P 1 class steam locomotive
- Bavarian B IV, an 1852 German steam locomotive
- Ceylon Government Railway B4
- GSR Class B4, a former Cork, Bandon and South Coast Railway steam locomotive of the Great Southern Railways, Ireland
- LSWR B4 class, an 1891 British dock tank locomotive
- PRR B4, an American Pennsylvania Railroad steam locomotive
- Soo Line B-4 class, an American 0-6-0 steam locomotive
- LB&SCR B4 class, a British tender locomotive class
- LNER Class B4, a British class of locomotives

=== Automotive uses ===
- Subaru B4, the name under which the Subaru Legacy is marketed in Israel
- B4 (New York City bus), serving Brooklyn
- B4 road (Namibia)
- Bundesstraße 4, federal highway in Germany
- Alpina B4, a German sports executive car

== In the military ==
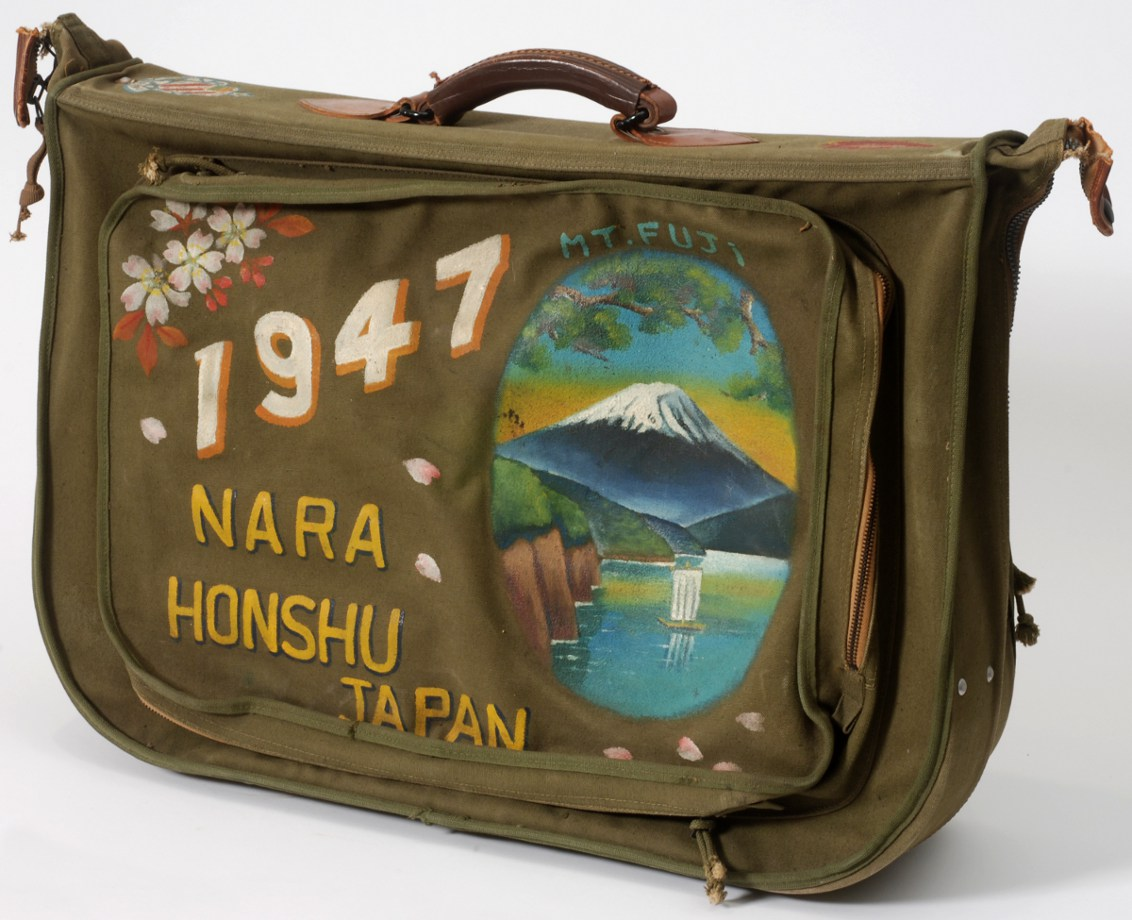
A painted B-4 bag

- HMS B4, a B-class submarine of the British Royal Navy
- Keystone B-4, a United States Army Air Corps biplane bomber
- SM UB-4, a 1915 German U-boat
- Spanish submarine B-4, a Spanish Navy submarine
- 203-mm howitzer M1931 (B-4), also known as "Stalin's Hammer", a World War II Soviet ordnance piece
- B-4 a United States Army Air Forces and United States Air Force flight bag
- A level of vehicle armour

== In science ==
- Leukotriene B4 receptor and Leukotriene B4 receptor 2, two human genes
- Lipoxin B4, a lipoxin
- Proanthocyanidin B4, a B type proanthocyanidin
- Vitamin B4, an alternate name for adenine
- A stellar classification

== In entertainment ==
- B4 (music show), a defunct British music video show broadcast on Channel 4
- B4 (TV channel), a defunct British music television channel
- B-4 (Star Trek), an android in the Star Trek fictional universe
- Babylon 4 space station, predecessor to Babylon 5 from the Babylon 5 television series
- The Lost City (B4), a Dungeons & Dragons adventure module

== Other uses ==
- B4 (classification), a parasports classification for visually impaired athletes
- B4 Street Fighter Championships, a 2000 fighting game tournament
- B4 or B4 II, a Native Instruments virtual synthesizer for Hammond organ (B-3) sound emulation
- B4-mount, used for professional video cameras such as Betacam
- An international standard paper size (250×353 mm), defined in ISO 216
- B04, Alekhine's Defence chess code
- 1. b4, Sokolsky Opening in chess

== See also ==
- 4B (disambiguation)
- Before (disambiguation)
- BIV (disambiguation)
