= Before =

Before is the opposite of after, and may refer to:

== Literature ==
- "Before" (short story) by Gael Baudino, 1996
- Before by Anna Todd, 2015

== Music ==
- Before (Gold Panda EP), 2009
- Before (James Blake EP), 2020
- "Before" (song), a 1996 song by the Pet Shop Boys
- "Before", a song by the Empire of the Sun from Two Vines
- "Before", a song by Anastacia from Evolution

== Television and film ==
- Before trilogy, by Richard Linklater
  - Before Sunrise, 1995
  - Before Sunset, 2004
  - Before Midnight, 2013
- Before (TV series), 2024

== See also ==
- Before Christ (BC), an epoch used in dating years prior to the estimated birth of Jesus
- Before Common Era (BCE), an alternative naming of the traditional calendar era primarily used in academic circles
- Before Present (BP), a timescale used mainly in geology
