= BBB =

BBB may refer to:

== Codes ==
- bbb, the ISO 639:b language code for Barai
- BBB, a type of birdshot used in shotgun shells
- BBB, BBB+, BBB−, investment grade Β bond credit ratings

== Arts and entertainment ==
=== Film and television ===
- Band Baaja Baaraat, a 2010 Bollywood romantic comedy
- Bakugan Battle Brawlers, an anime series
- Bear Behaving Badly, a British TV show starring Barney Harwood
- Beethoven's Big Break, the sixth installment in the Beethoven film series
- Bha. Bha. Ba., a 2025 Indian film by Dhananjay Shankar
- Big Bad Beetleborgs, a 1990s children's TV show
- Big Brother Brasil, the Brazilian version of the reality show Big Brother
- Big Buck Bunny, an open-movie produced by the Blender Institute, with open-source tools
- Britain's Best Bakery, a British daytime cookery show produced by ITV
- BBB, the production code for the 1970 Doctor Who serial Doctor Who and the Silurians

=== Literature ===
- Biblioteca del Bicentenario de Bolivia, a Bolivian book series
- Black Blood Brothers, a light novel series written by Kohei Azano
- Blood Blockade Battlefront, a manga series written and illustrated by Yasuhiro Nightow
- Big Blue Book, a series of small staple-bound books

=== Music ===
- Three Bs, Bach, Beethoven, and Brahms (sometimes Berlioz), three prominent classical composers
- Brendan B. Brown, frontman of alternative rock band Wheatus
- Big Bad Brad, the nickname of Brad Delson of the band Linkin Park
- Balkan Beat Box, an Israeli Gypsy punk band
- The Blues Brothers Band
- The Bollywood Brass Band
- Bad Boys Blue, a multinational pop group formed in Germany

==== EPs ====
- B.B.B (EP), a 2014 extended play by Korean girl group Dal Shabet featuring the single "B.B.B (Big Baby Baby)"
- "BBB", an EP by British DJ and electronic music producer Ben Sterling

==== Songs ====
- "B.B.B." (song), by Juvenile featuring Genesisthegawd
- "BBB", a song by the band How to Destroy Angels from their EP How to Destroy Angels
- "BBB", a 2021 song by @onefive from 1518
- "Bara bada bastu", a 2025 single by Finland-Swedish group KAJ

== Science and technology ==
- Bioscience, Biotechnology, and Biochemistry, a scientific journal
- Bombay Before the British: The Indo-Portuguese Layer, a Portuguese research project in History of Architecture (2004–2007)
- BeagleBone Black, a single-board computer

=== Medicine ===
- Blood–brain barrier, a structure that protects the brain from chemicals in the blood
- Bundle branch block, refers to a defect of the heart's electrical conduction system

== Organizations ==
- Better Business Bureau, a North American organization of businesses supporting consumer rights
- Bredbandsbolaget, a Swedish Internet service provider
- Bad Blue Boys, supporters of the Zagreb football club GNK Dinamo Zagreb
- Beta Beta Beta, an honor society and academic fraternity for higher education students specializing in biology
- Bed Bath & Beyond (1987–2023), a home products store
- Big Baller Brand, LaVar Balls family brand
- Big Blue Bubble, a gaming company

=== Politics ===
- One Big Beautiful Bill Act, a 2025 United States law
- Bavarian Peasants' League (Bayerischer Bauernbund), a former German political party
- Biotic Baking Brigade, a loosely connected group of activists known for throwing pies
- Bulgarian Business Bloc, a former political party in Bulgaria
- Blanke Bevrydingsbeweging, a South African white supremacist and Neo-Nazi group
- Farmer–Citizen Movement (BoerBurgerBeweging), a political party in the Netherlands

== People ==
- Bam Bam Bigelow (1961–2007), the ringname of professional wrestler Scott Bigelow
- Brown Buttabean or David Letele, New Zealand boxer and community worker

== Other ==
- Banat, Bačka and Baranja, a de facto province of the Kingdom of Serbia and the Kingdom of Serbs, Croats and Slovenes
- Baseball Boss, a web-based, free online baseball game
- Beach Blanket Babylon, was the world's longest-running musical revue
- BigBlueButton, an open source web conferencing system
- Bikes Blues and BBQ, an annual motorcycle rally in Fayetteville, Arkansas, United States
- Build Back Better (disambiguation), any one of several policies
- Build! Build! Build!, the infrastructure program of the administration of Rodrigo Duterte in the Philippines

== See also ==
- 3B (disambiguation)
- B (disambiguation)
- B3 (disambiguation)
- BB (disambiguation)
- BBBB (disambiguation)
- Bee Bee Bee, U.S. racehorse
- BB♭, English multiple-letter notation for a low B♭
