= Elvish languages =

Constructed languages used in fantasies

Elvish languages are constructed languages used by Elves in a fantasy setting. The philologist and fantasy author J. R. R. Tolkien created the first of these languages, including Quenya and Sindarin.

== Tolkien's Elvish languages ==
The philologist and high fantasy author J. R. R. Tolkien created many languages for his Elves, leading him to create the mythology of his Middle-earth books, complete with multiple divisions of the Elves, to speak the languages he had constructed. The languages have quickly spread in modern-day use. His interest was primarily philological, and he stated that his stories grew out of his languages. The languages were the first thing Tolkien created for his mythos, starting with what he originally called "Qenya", the first primitive form of Elvish. This was later called Quenya (High-elven) and is one of the two most complete of Tolkien's languages (the other being Sindarin, or Grey-elven). The phonology and grammar of Quenya are influenced by Finnish, while Sindarin is influenced by Welsh.

Internal history of Tolkien's Elvish languages
Primitive Quendian the tongue of all Elves at Cuiviénen
Common Eldarin the tongue of the Elves during the March					Avarin combined languages of the Avari (at least six), some later merged with Nandorin
Quenya the language of the Ñoldor and the Vanyar			Common Telerin the early language of all the Lindar		Avarin combined languages of the Avari (at least six), some later merged with Nandorin
Quendya also Vanyarin Quenya, daily tongue of the Vanyar	Exilic Quenya also Ñoldorin Quenya, colloquial speech of the Noldor	Telerin the language of the Teleri who reached the Undying Lands; a dialect of Quenya	Sindarin language of the Sindar	Nandorin languages of the Nandor, some were influenced by Avarin	Avarin combined languages of the Avari (at least six), some later merged with Nandorin

Tolkien conceived a family tree of Elvish languages, all descending from a common ancestor called Primitive Quendian. He worked extensively on how the languages diverged from Primitive Quendian over time, in phonology and grammar, in imitation of the development of real language families. In addition to Quenya and Sindarin, he sketched several other Elvish languages in far less detail, such as Telerin, Nandorin, and Avarin.

In addition to Tolkien's original lexicon, many fans have contributed words and phrases, attempting to create a language that can be fully used in reality.

== Other Elvish languages ==
Since Tolkien, others have invented Elvish languages in their own fiction. Some have borrowed sounds, forms, and whole words from Tolkien's Elvish languages.

Elvish languages
Language	Creator	Setting	Based on	Notes
The Ancient Language	Christopher Paolini	The Inheritance Cycle	Old Norse, Tolkien	Used by elves and by the riders and other magic users to cast spells. It was the language of the now extinct Grey Folk. One cannot lie in the Ancient Language and one is bound by what one says in it.
Ellylon and Hen Llinge (Elder Speech)	Andrzej Sapkowski	The Witcher saga	Welsh, Irish, French and English	
Eltharin		Warhammer Fantasy		Has its own font. Includes Fan-Eltharin, the language of the Wood Elves; Tar-Eltharin, the language of the Sea Elves and High Elves; Druhir, the language of the Dark Elves
Elvish	Gael Baudino	Strands series	Romance languages	
Elvish		Warcraft universe	Superficially resembles Tolkien's Elvish	Darnassian, Nazja, and Thalassian are considered the modern elvish tongues spoken by the modern Kaldorei, the Naga, and the Highborne (respectively), while Elvish itself is an ancient tongue no longer used as a primary language. It is assumed that Elvish is the language from which Darnassian evolved; Darnassian then branched into Nazja, spoken underwater by the Kaldorei that followed Queen Azshara after the sundering, and later on, Thalassian, spoken by the highborne and Blood Elves.
Gnommish		Artemis Fowl series	Letter-substitution cipher for English	Sometimes read in a spiral.
Ehlnofex		The Elder Scrolls		The Elves, or Mer, use languages derived from ancient Ehlnofex, including Dunmeris, Pyandonean, Orcish (Orsimeris) and Bosmeris.
Shiväisith	David J. Peterson	Thor: The Dark World	Finno-Ugric	The language of the Dark Elves. Written in Todjydheenil runes, based on Nordic runes.
Övüsi	David J. Peterson	Bright		
Hen Llinge (Elder Speech)	David J. Peterson	Netflix's The Witcher		
