= BIV =

BIV may refer to:

- Bovine immunodeficiency virus, a cattle virus similar to HIV
- Brain in a vat, a scenario for thought experiments
- Business in Vancouver, weekly news journal

== See also ==
- B4 (disambiguation), including a list of topics named B.IV, etc.
