= Shroud of Shadow =

1994 novel by Gael Baudino

- Cover of 1993 US release
- Author: Gael Baudino
- Cover artist: Thomas Canty
- Language: English
- Series: The Strands Series
- Genre: Fantasy novel
- Publisher: Roc Books
- Publication date: 1994
- Publication place: United States
- Media type: Print (Paperback)
- ISBN: 0-451-45294-1
- OCLC: 29187278
- Preceded by: Maze of Moonlight
- Followed by: Strands of Sunlight

Shroud of Shadow is a novel written by Gael Baudino in 1994. It is the third in the Strands of Starlight tetralogy. The other novels are Strands of Starlight, Maze of Moonlight, and Strands of Sunlight.

== Plot introduction ==
The protagonist of Shroud of Shadow is Natil the elf. Introduced in Strands of Starlight as a minor character and developed more in Maze of Moonlight, she has returned to Adria from wandering the earth looking for Elves. All of the other Elves introduced in the previous two books have died or faded in some manner, though only Varden, Terrill, and Mirya's fates are specifically described. This story takes place in 1500 CE, about a century after Maze of Moonlight, though it is intercut with scenes of 1990's Denver, Colorado, United States, where two people are experiencing the awakening of Elven blood.

== Plot summary ==
Natil returns to Adria convinced that she is the last of the elves on Earth. This realization, as well as the gradual fading of her powers, has provoked a crisis of faith in her; she still wants to aid and comfort all whom she meets, but with every day, her powers wane and she becomes more and more human. She has begun to sleep, something she has never done before. While she sleeps, she dreams of humans in 1990 Denver, George and Sally, who are becoming Elves.

Near the fishing town of Maris, she encounters Omelda, a nun recently escaped from Shrinerock Abbey, who is tormented by voices in her head. Every day, Omelda hears the rituals marking the Canonical hours in her head, without fail. Though she fights them, they take over her mind and make her little more than a zombie for people to take advantage of as they wish. On her way to commit suicide by casting herself off the cliffs overlooking Maris, Omelda falls afoul of some village guardsmen, who barter her safe passage for sex. Continuing on, she sees Natil's campfire, hears her harp music, and she finds that the harp music quiets the voices in her head.

Traveling with Omelda, Natil takes employment with Jacob Aldernacht, a prosperous merchant: she as a harper, and Omelda as a housekeeper. Omelda quickly falls into the clutches of Jacob's grandsons, Edvard and Norman, who make her their sex toy. Dazed by the constant voices in her head, Omelda can only endure. Natil becomes friends with Jacob and starts trying to comfort him; though he is rich, he is lonely and bitter. One night Natil realizes what the grandsons are doing to Omelda, finds them in their secret lair in the Aldernacht house, and kills them both.

Fleeing the Aldernacht house, Natil determines to return Omelda to Shrinerock Abbey. Omelda has developed an infection and is deathly sick due to her misuse by Edvard and Norman, so Natil and she stop in the Free Town of Furze for medical assistance. Due to Omelda's delirious ravings, they fall into the clutches of the Inquisition and are taken to the Inquisition's prison. Hanging in chains, Natil gets a glimpse of the Lady after not having seen her for years. This restores her fully to an Elven state, and while being sentenced, she denounces the Inquisitor for all of the wrongs done to Elves by humans through the ages.

When her infection becomes too severe, Omelda gives herself entirely to the song in her head and dies in her cell. Later, forces loyal to the Aldernachts break into the prison and free Natil and everyone else being held there. After healing those torture survivors she can, she leaves Jacob Aldernacht's employ, at a loss about what to do. Imagining she will fade as many of the other Elves have, she stops by the ruins of Saint Brigid for final goodbyes. While lingering there and debating what to do, she spies a strange glow in the distance. Fighting her way to it through a torrential rainstorm, she finds a mystical gateway, resembling one she has seen in her dreams, in the fork of a tree. Stepping through, she finds herself in modern-day Denver with a new mission: guide the newly awakened Elves.

== Characters in Shroud of Shadow ==
=== Elves ===
- Natil
- Hadden - born George Morrison, he is the first modern human to become an Elf.
- Wheat - born Sally Hennock, she is the second modern human to become an Elf.
- Ash - born Joan Buckland.
- Lauri
- Bright
- Raven
- Web
- Marsh
- Heather

=== Humans ===
- Omelda
- Jacob Aldernacht

=== Historical figures mentioned in Shroud of Shadow ===
- Elia del Medigo
- Bernard Gui

== Editions ==
- ISBN 0451452941 (US mass market paperback, 1993, ROC, cover art by Thomas Canty)
- ISBN 1857232690 (UK mass market paperback, 1993, Orbit)
- OCLC 62083431 (Audio Book, 2005, Volunteer Services for the Visually Handicapped)
