= Fokker B.III =

The designation B.III was used for two completely unrelated aircraft produced by Fokker:

- A reconnaissance biplane, flown by Austria-Hungary during World War I
- A biplane flying boat, developed for the Dutch East Indies Naval Air Force in the 1920s

== See also ==
- B3 (disambiguation)
