= Dragonsword =

1988 novel by Gael Baudino

- Cover of first edition of Dragonsword
- Author: Gael Baudino
- Cover artist: Walter Velez
- Language: English
- Series: The Dragonsword Series
- Genre: Fantasy novel
- Publisher: Lynx Omeiga Books
- Publication date: 1988
- Publication place: United States
- Media type: Print (Paperback)
- ISBN: 1-55802-003-9
- OCLC: 123105113
- LC Class: CPB Box no. 2523 vol. 8
- Followed by: Duel of Dragons

Dragonsword is a novel written by Gael Baudino and published in 1988. It is the first in the Dragonsword Trilogy. The other novels are Duel of Dragons (1989) and Dragon Death (1992). According to the author, after completing an unfinished manuscript and fleshing it out to roughly double its length, she sold it to Byron Preiss Books, a "book packaging company" looking for a "series of sword and sorcery novels including dragons and a super-magical sword", who sold it to Lynx Omeiga Books. After Lynx Omeiga went out of business, Roc Books acquired rights to the whole trilogy and reprinted Dragonsword in 1991. While reviewing Roc's galley proofs for Dragonsword, Baudino made several minor wording changes in the narrative and corrected one large error which she declines to elaborate on. Thus, the first and second editions of Dragonsword are not identical in content.

== Plot introduction ==
The protagonist of Dragonsword is Suzanne Helling, a young woman living in 1980 Los Angeles, California, USA. She is taken away to the land of Gryylth and transformed into the warrior Alouzon Dragonmaster.

== Plot summary ==
Suzanne Helling has been living a nomadic life since she went through the 1970 Kent State shootings, and she winds up in Los Angeles as a teaching assistant to history professor Solomon Braithwaite. Ten years earlier, his marriage ended, and he tried to kill himself. While comatose from his drug overdose, his unconscious mind took flight and created the land of Gryylth, which he patterned subconsciously on 5th-century Roman Britain, in a corner of the cosmos. Though Gryylth bears a superficial similarity to ancient Britain, there are significant differences: the inhabitants speak modern English; no one remembers more than ten years back; and Gryylth is an incomplete land—it ends in mist and nothingness in the surrounding ocean.

In this realm, Braithwaite has an alternate persona: Dythragor Dragonmaster, the protector of Gryylth and rider of the dragon Silbakor. There he is tall, strong, and a skilled fighter. In the real world, though, he is an old man with a failing heart. Silbakor has been pressuring him to choose a replacement in anticipation of his eventual death. When Braithwaite proves unwilling to choose, Silbakor chooses Suzanne and transports both of them to Gryylth. There, Suzanne also adopts a new persona: Alouzon Dragonmaster, who, like Dythragor, is tall, strong and skilled with weapons.

A new peril faces Gryylth: the Dremords, invaders from the sea, have taken the Tree of Creation from the Blasted Heath and are planning a new invasion. This tree embodies uncontrolled change and chaos, and in the hands of Tireas, the Dremords' magician, it becomes a potent tool for war. While Dythragor and Alouzon clash on their leadership styles, Alouzon also realizes that Braithwaite's biases have colored Gryylth: the Dremords are unquestioningly feared as enemies; women are little more than chattel unable to bear weapons in their own defense; and magic is feared and distrusted.

As the war with the Dremords grinds on, Alouzon makes friends and allies among the inhabitants of Gryylth and begins to see in it something worth fighting for and defending. At the same time, Dythragor's grip on reality is slipping, as both the war and Alouzon challenge everything he wants to be true. The magic of the Tree proves unstoppable, turning the soldiers of the First Wartroop into women and decimating the Second Wartroop. The Gryylthians decide to make a final stand at the Circle, which is a pristine replica of Stonehenge, where Mernyl, Gryylth's sorcerer, can tap the energies of the Circle to counteract the energies of the Tree.

In this final standoff, Tireas and Mernyl wind up in a stalemate, with neither one able to gain a decisive victory and losses mounting on both sides. Remembering her history, Alouzon realizes that the megalith that the two magicians are standing by is only loosely anchored in the soil. She and her friends work to topple the stone on both sorcerers, hoping to end the struggle decisively. Seeing they are unable to topple the stone, Dythragor has Silbakor dive at high speed toward the stone, and he then launches himself off of the dragon's back at the stone, toppling it onto the sorcerers and the Tree and ending the conflict with his sacrifice. With the creator of Gryylth dead, the land begins to fade into nothingness. Alouzon realizes that she has the choice to become protector of Gryylth and save it from destruction. When she accepts, Gryylth becomes real again. Leaving Gryylth and flying over the ocean, she realizes that a new land was created out of her subconscious when she became protector: Vaylle. She returns to Los Angeles and finds Solomon dead.

== Editions ==
- ISBN 1558020039 (US mass market paperback, 1988, Lynx books)
- ISBN 0099690705 (UK mass market paperback, 1990, Legend books)
- ISBN 0451450817 (US mass market paperback, 1991, ROC books)
