= B3 =

B3, B03, B.III or B-3 may refer to:

== Military ==
=== American bombers ===
- Keystone B-3, a biplane bomber of the United States Army Air Corps
- Next-Generation Bomber (2018 Bomber), next bomber follow-on to the B-2 stealth bomber program
- Long Range Strike Bomber program, successor program to the 2018 Bomber program
  - Northrop Grumman B-21, a successor aircraft to the B-1 and B-52 bombers

=== German and Austro-Hungarian aircraft ===
- AEG B.III, a German reconnaissance aircraft
- Albatros B.III, a German Idflieg B-class designation aircraft
- Aviatik B.III, a 1916 Austro-Hungarian reconnaissance aircraft
- Euler B.III, a German Idflieg B-class designation aircraft
- Fokker B.III (disambiguation), two aircraft models
- Halberstadt B.III, a German Idflieg B-class designation aircraft
- Kampfgeschwader 54, from its historic Geschwaderkennung code with the Luftwaffe in World War II
- Lohner B.III
- LVG B.III, a 1910s German two-seat trainer biplane

=== Submarines ===
- HMS B3, a British Royal Navy B-class submarine
- Spanish submarine B-3, a Spanish Navy B-class submarine
- USS B-3 (SS-12), a United States Navy B-class submarine

== Civilian transportation ==
=== Roads ===
- B3 road (Kenya)
- B3 road (Namibia)
- Bundesstraße 3, a German national highway

=== Trains ===
- Alsace-Lorraine B 3, an Alsace-Lorraine P 1 class steam locomotive
- Bavarian B III, an 1852 German steam locomotive model
- Ceylon Government Railway B3, a steam locomotive class
- NCC Class B3, an 1890 Irish 4-4-0 passenger steam locomotive
- NSB B3 (Class 3), Norwegian railway carriages
- LNER Class B3, a British locomotive class

=== Other ===
- B3 (New York City bus) serving Brooklyn
- B3, a spur of the B (SEPTA Metro) in Philadelphia, PA, US
- Bellview Airlines (International Air Transport Association code B3)

== Biology and medicine ==
- Vitamin B_{3} (niacin)
- B3 (classification), a medical-based Paralympic disability sport classification for blind sport
- B3 domain, a highly conserved plant DNA-binding domain
- Procyanidin B3, a plant phenolic compound
- ATC code B03 Antianemic preparations, a subgroup of the Anatomical Therapeutic Chemical Classification System
- Prodelphinidin B3, a plant phenolic compound

== Computing ==
- A TCSEC security class in the Trusted Computer System Evaluation Criteria
- "B3 Coin" a cryptocurrency

== Engines ==
- A type of four-cylinder Mazda B engine
- Benz B.III, an engine powering the 1914 Friedrichshafen FF.33 German aircraft

== Music ==
- B3 (band), an American boy band most popular in Germany
- B3 (EP), a 2012 EP by alternative rock band Placebo
- Hammond B-3, an electric organ

== Other uses ==
- B3 (stock exchange)
- $B_3^I$, the Bochvar logic in calculus
- B03, Alekhine's Defence chess code
- B3: Battle by the Bay, a 1996 Street Fighter tournament
- B3 oil field, an oil and gas field in the Baltic sea
- Model B3 chair, a 1925 German Wassili designer chair
- A subclass of B-class stars in stellar classification
- a permission code for Town and country planning in the United Kingdom
- Big Beautiful Bill, a 2025 omnibus bill proposed by POTUS Donald Trump
- An ISO 216 international standard that defines paper size
- B_{3} the chemical formula for triboracyclopropenyl

== See also ==
- BE (disambiguation)
- 3B (disambiguation)
- BBB (disambiguation)
