= Maze of Moonlight =

1993 novel by Gael Baudino

- Cover of 1993 US release
- Author: Gael Baudino
- Cover artist: Thomas Canty
- Language: English
- Series: The Strands Series
- Genre: Fantasy novel
- Publisher: Roc Books
- Publication date: 1993
- Publication place: United States
- Media type: Print (Paperback)
- ISBN: 0-451-45230-5
- OCLC: 27637862
- Preceded by: Strands of Starlight
- Followed by: Shroud of Shadow

Maze of Moonlight is a novel written by Gael Baudino in 1993. It is the second in the Strands of Starlight tetralogy. The other novels are Strands of Starlight, Shroud of Shadow, and Strands of Sunlight.

== Plot introduction ==
The protagonist of Maze of Moonlight is Christopher delAurvre, Baron of Aurverelle and grandson of Roger delAurvre. The story picks up two generations after the end of Strands of Starlight during the time of the Western Schism. Christopher has been away on the Crusade of Nicopolis in 1396 CE.

== Plot summary ==
Christopher returns to Aurverelle in 1400, more than three years after the Ottoman Empire's victory at Battle of Nicopolis, with his health and sanity severely damaged. He is soured on religion and nobility, having seen the hypocrisy of all kinds while away. Etienne of Languedoc, a representative of Roman Pope Boniface IX, arrives to have an audience with him, but Christopher refuses to see him. Staying at the local inn, Etienne takes out his frustration on Vanessa, granddaughter of the elf Varden, by brutally beating her nearly to death when she rejects his advances. Christopher kills him and takes Vanessa in.

Just as he is about to give up hope of Vanessa recovering from her wounds, Mirya and Terrill arrive, posing as healers from far away, and they heal her completely. Christopher befriends Vanessa and helps her to make sense of the images in her head that make her fear for her sanity, those images being the patterns of reality she can see because of her part-elven blood. She departs for Saint Blaise, but, arriving at the gates of Saint Blaise, she decides at the last minute to seek out whatever family of hers may still remain in Saint Brigid.

Christopher's cousin, Yvonette a'Verne, baron of Hypprux, has designs on the wealth of the city of Ypris, so he arranges for several bands of mercenaries to sack the town and split the proceeds with him, not foreseeing that when the bands are done with Ypris, they will begin looting the rest of Adria. Using blackmail, Christopher persuades Yvonette to join an alliance of other noblemen of the area to fight off the mercenaries when they do decide to strike off on their own.

After the fall of Ypris, one band of mercenaries, the Fellowship of Acquisition, sacks the Free Town of Saint Blaise and takes over Shrinerock, a nearby castle. Realizing the potential of a castle to hold people in as well as out, Christopher convinces Natil to use her otherworldly powers to fuse the castle's walls, doors, windows, and gates into solid stone, thus giving Terrill time to shepherd the survivors of Saint Blaise's and Shrinerock's fall through Malvern Forest to safety in Aurverelle.

Christopher goes to Saint Brigid to rescue Vanessa. He is trapped there with Vanessa, Mirya, and Natil when the Fellowship besiege the town. Using Mirya's elven powers and Christopher's command of unorthodox fighting tactics, they hold the mercenaries at bay. With discord setting in among the ranks of the Fellowship, Berard of Onella, the leader of the Fellowship, is assassinated by one of his own. At the same time, the remaining members of the alliance ambush the Fellowship and slaughter them.

== Characters ==
=== Elves ===
- Natil – skilled at playing the wire-strung harp.
- Mirya – a great healer and potent warrior.
- Terrill – Mirya's lover. Fades away at the end of the book.
- Vanessa – Varden's granddaughter and Lake's daughter. Begins as mostly human and turns herself mostly Elven using her vision of the patterns.
- Varden – fades from existence after a final rejection by his son, Lake.

=== Humans ===
- Christopher delAurvre – Baron Roger's grandson. Haunted by the about-face Roger performed after his alteration by Mirya.
- Pytor – an escaped serf from Medno, Slovenia. Is Christopher's seneschal.
- Charity – the young girl from Strands of Starlight, aged to about 60 years. Not quite human and not quite Elven. Gives her life to save other villagers.
- Etienne of Languedoc
- Yvonette a'Verne

=== Historical figures ===
- John Hawkwood and the White Company
- Bernabò Visconti

== Editions ==
- ISBN 0451452305 (US mass market paperback, 1993, Penguin Books, cover art by Thomas Canty)
- ISBN 1857232682 (UK mass market paperback, 1993, Orbit)
- OCLC 61346397 (Audio book, 2005, Volunteer Services for the Visually Handicapped)
