= Dragon Death =

1992 novel by Gael Baudino

- First edition cover
- Author: Gael Baudino
- Language: English
- Series: The Dragonsword Series
- Genre: Fantasy novel
- Publisher: Roc Books
- Publication date: 1992
- Publication place: United States
- Media type: Print (Paperback)
- ISBN: 0-451-45147-3
- OCLC: 25623116
- Preceded by: Duel of Dragons

Dragon Death is a novel written by Gael Baudino and published in 1992. It is the third in the Dragonsword Trilogy. The other novels are Dragonsword (1989) and Duel of Dragons (1991).

== Plot introduction ==
The protagonist of Dragon Death is Suzanne Helling, a young woman living in 1980 Los Angeles, California, USA. She is taken away to the land of Gryylth and transformed into the warrior Alouzon Dragonmaster.

== Plot summary ==
The story picks up just after the end of Duel of Dragons. Alouzon is still in Los Angeles, and her party back in Vaylle is returning from the mountains with news of what has happened. Alouzon returns to Helen Addams' house and sees Helen's and Suzanne's bodies being carried from the wreckage.

While Alouzon works on understanding the nature of her predicament, Helwych has returned to Gryylth with stories of Vaylle's treachery and sorcery. Using lies and manipulation, he maneuvers Gryylth's and Corrian's kings into sending a massive war fleet across the sea to Vaylle while he remains behind, ostensibly to guard Gryylth.

When the kings arrive in Vaylle with their warfleet, Helwych erects a barrier across the sea to keep them out of Gryylth and conjures up 20th century troops and arms to consolidate his power and frighten the population. The Spectre also begins sending Grayfaces and modern weaponry into Gryylth to battle Helwych for power.

When Alouzon is attacked in a park by supernatural beasts, members of her team discover a gateway from Vaylle to Los Angeles and come to her aid. Realizing this is the way to circumvent Helwych's barrier, Alouzon brings an army from Vaylle to Los Angeles and through another gateway, located in Solomon's old office at UCLA, into Gryylth.

As Kyria battles Helwych, and the Gryylthian and Corrinian armies battle the Greyfaces in Gryylth, Alouzon engages the Spectre and the White Worm in a running battle through downtown Los Angeles that winds up at Solomon's grave. When they arrive there, Solomon's corpse rises from the ground and battles the Spectre to a standstill.

While they battle, Alouzon sees a white tower that mirrors one in her dreams. Entering it, she finds the Grail and realizes that whatever higher power allowed the creation of Gryylth has put a choice before her. She can let Gryylth continue the way it has, or she can become more than its protector: she can become its goddess. Alouzon chooses to become goddess of Gryylth. With that choice made war in Gryylth comes to an end and the land is healed.

== Editions ==
- ISBN 0451451473 (US mass market paperback, 1992, Roc books)
