= 19 (band) =

Japanese musical duo

19 (ジューク, Jūku) was a Japanese pop/folk duo of Kenji Okahira and Keigo Iwase. It debuted in 1998 and broke up in March 2002. They had multiple albums and singles in the top ten on the Oricon charts.

Ohakira is now a member of the band 3B Lab.

== Discography ==
=== Singles ===
- 'Ano Ao wo Koete' (21 November 1998)
- 'Ano Kamihikoki Kumori-zora Watte' (20 March 1999)
- 'Subete he ' (21 October 1999)
- 'Hate no nai Michi' (21 April 2000)
- 'Sui Riku Sora, Mugendai' (5 July 2000)
- 'Haikei Roman' (29 November 2000)
- 'Ashiato' (25 April 2001) (reached #2 on the Oricon charts, charted for 9 weeks)
- Taisetsuna Hito (たいせつなひと, lit, Important Person) (22 August 2001) (reached #3 on the Oricon charts, charted for 8 weeks)
- 'Tanpopo' (21 March 2002) (reached #2 on the Oricon charts, charted for 7 weeks)

=== Albums ===
- Ongaku (23 July 1999)
- Mugendai (26 July 2000)
- up to you (27 September 2001) (reached #2 on the Oricon charts, charted for 8 weeks)
- 19 BEST Haru (27 April 2002) (reached #5 on the Oricon charts, charted for 6 weeks)
- 19 BEST Ao (27 April 2002) (reached #3 on the Oricon charts, charted for 8 weeks)
- 19 BEST LIVE Audio use only (24 July 2002)

=== Video ===
- Seireki Zenshin 2000nen "Daibakusin Eizo!" (23 March 2000)
- 19 LAST LIVE TV use only (24 July 2002)
- 19 VIDEO CLIPS 1>9 (21 August 2002)

=== DVD ===
- Seireki Zenshin 2000nen "Daibakushin Eizo!" (6 December 2000)
- 19 LAST LIVE TV use only (24 July 2002)
- 19 VIDEO CLIPS 1>9 (21 August 2002)
