= Strands of Sunlight =

1994 novel by Gael Baudino

- Cover of 1994 US release
- Author: Gael Baudino
- Cover artist: Thomas Canty
- Language: English
- Series: The Strands Series
- Genre: Fantasy novel
- Publisher: Roc Books
- Publication date: 1994
- Publication place: United States
- Media type: Print (Paperback)
- ISBN: 0-451-45408-1
- OCLC: 30651028
- Preceded by: Shroud of Shadow and Spires of Spirit

Strands of Sunlight is a novel written by Gael Baudino in 1994. It is the fourth in the Strands of Starlight tetralogy. The other novels are Strands of Starlight, Maze of Moonlight, and Shroud of Shadow. Out of the four-book series, this book alone was not released in the UK market because, according to the author, the publishers believed "that British readers won't have any interest in events set in contemporary Denver".

== Plot introduction ==
The principal protagonist in Strands of Sunlight is Natil the elf, though its multiple narratives follow several important secondary characters. The story takes place in 1990's Denver, USA. It concerns several humans who have had ancient Elven blood in their veins awaken and begin making them Elves.

There are seventeen Elves in Denver when the story starts, though only 15 are named: Natil, Hadden, Wheat, Marsh, Kelly, Bright, Lauri, Raven, Heather, Ash, Web, Fox, Dell, Alessandro, and Tristan. Two humans also figure heavily in the story line: Sandy Joy, an abuse survivor from Los Angeles, and T.K., a black military veteran missing a leg.

The story follows three major arcs: Natil trying to guide the new Elves in what it means to be an Elf; Sandy Joy's search for safety and acceptance; and T.K.'s search for hope and a sense of belonging.

== Plot summary ==
Natil is a gardener at Kingsley College, a private university in Denver. She has found a small group of people who have started transforming into Elves and need guidance, though she has not revealed many details of the early portions of her existence, nor has she revealed the divine vision she once had but now cannot even describe to them.

In one narrative thread, Sandy Joy comes to Denver at the invitation of a man named Terry Angel. Exploiting the weak emotional condition of the Dean of Kingsley College, Maxwell Delmari, he has been given free rein to set up a sham program, named Hands of Grace, that purportedly uses music to heal people. Referring to obscure or bogus publications and fake references, Terry has hidden the fact that there is no program and no factual basis for his work.

Thoroughly insane and plagued by fleeting partial visions of a hidden higher power, Terry tortures himself with self-mutilation in an effort to finally see this higher power. When Sandy states that she has had a vision of a higher power, he comes to envy and loathe her. After she realizes the falsity of his convictions and tries to distance herself from him, he attacks her, slashing her hands with a knife. Fighting for her life, she sprays him in the face with oven cleaner, blinding him.

In another narrative thread, T.K. has just recently returned from Desert Storm missing a leg. A Vietnam War veteran and a black man, he has been marginalized his entire life and is now working at the same security firm that once employed George Morrison, who is now the elf Hadden. Living in Denver's projects, he sees a crack house operating every day just down the street from him, and he is powerless to do anything about it. Finding employment at Treestar Surveying, he finds his barriers eroding as he comes to realize that he is becoming an Elf too and is no longer subject to the same hopeless future he once had.

After Heather, one of the Elves, is shot by drug dealers for TK's efforts at evicting the crack house from his neighborhood, he steals military ordnance and demolishes the crack house with two pounds of C4 after a desperate gun battle that destroys his artificial leg. Concluding his transformation into an Elf while he sleeps a few nights later, he wakes up the following day whole, his leg intact, having finally discharged his last tie to his old life. When the police come to question him about the pieces of his artificial leg, which he left at the ruins of the crack house when Sandy drove him to safety, the presence of both of his legs deflects their attention away from him.

As both narrative threads come together, Sandy is held by the police for assault after Terry lies and says that Sandy attacked him first. Out on bail, Sandy's overwhelming grief at her predicament serves as the final catalyst for helping all of the Elves finally learn how to draw strength from the patterns and use all of the powers at their disposal. Natil, seeing no choice, strikes a deal with Terry and uses her regained powers to heal Terry's eyes so that he will tell the truth of what happened to Sandy. Consumed with shame and grief at the banality of bargaining her healing powers for the truth from Terry and knowing that he will soon commit suicide because of what she has done for him, Natil finally gives up her immortal existence of four and a half billion years and fades from the earth. The others search for her and finally find her grieving in the land of sunlight with the Lady.

== Characters in Strands of Starlight ==
=== Elves ===
- Natil
- Hadden - born George Morrison, he is the first modern human to become an Elf.
- Wheat - born Sally Hennock, she is the second modern human to become an Elf.
- Marsh
- Kelly - Heather and Marsh's child, she is the only modern Elf born as an Elf.
- Bright
- Lauri - born Lauri Tonso
- Heather - Marsh's wife and Kelly's mother, she is shot by drug dealers in an attempt on T.K.'s life.
- Ash - born Joan Buckland
- Raven
- Web - works at Treestar Surveying
- Fox
- Dell
- Alessandro
- Tristan

=== Humans ===
- Sandy Joy
- TK
- Terry Angel
- Maxwell Delmari - the dean of Kingsley College, he is likely a descendant of the delMari family mentioned in the first three books.

== Editions ==
- ISBN 0451454081 (US mass market paperback, 1994, ROC, cover art by Thomas Canty)
- OCLC 61883530 (Audio book, 2005, Volunteer Services for the Visually Handicapped)
