= Tidings of Comfort and Joy =

- Short story by Gael Baudino
- Country: United States
- Language: English
- Genre: Fantasy short story

Publication
- Published in: The Magic of Christmas
- Publication type: Anthology
- Publisher: Roc Books
- Media type: Print (Paperback)
- Publication date: 1992
- Series: The Magic of Christmas

"Tidings of Comfort and Joy" is a fantasy short story by Gael Baudino. It concerns Julianna, a Wiccan living in Denver, and her otherworldly encounter with her friend Paul, who is a priest, and her undead ex-husband Bob.

== Plot summary ==
Paul contacts Julianna after years of mutual avoidance to tell her that Bob has died, after a fashion. Trauma from intense abuse as a child caused Bob's marriage to Julianna to fall apart, as he needed too much from her. His second wife, however, was able to provide him what he needed. After she dies in a car crash, he gives up on life but is not able to completely abandon living. When his body dies, he remains conscious, stuck in a rotting shell but too afraid to go into the unknown.

Bob being a parishioner of his, Paul is at a loss about what to do, so he contacts Julianna to see if her religion can help. They hatch a plan to dig up his ex-wife and reanimate her corpse so that the two of them can finally die together. Their plan works, and Julianna and Paul have a new, deeper relationship with each other.

== See also ==
- God Rest You Merry, Gentlemen, first line of refrain
