= Strands of Starlight =

1989 novel by Gael Baudino

- Cover of 1989 US release
- Author: Gael Baudino
- Cover artist: Thomas Canty
- Language: English
- Series: The Strands Series
- Genre: Fantasy novel
- Publisher: Roc Books
- Publication date: 1989
- Publication place: United States
- Media type: Print (Paperback)
- ISBN: 0-451-45316-6
- OCLC: 80098135
- Preceded by: Spires of Spirit
- Followed by: Maze of Moonlight

Strands of Starlight is a novel written by Gael Baudino and published in 1989. It is the first in the Strands of Starlight tetralogy. The other novels are Maze of Moonlight, Shroud of Shadow, and Strands of Sunlight.

== Plot introduction ==
The protagonist of Strands of Starlight is Miriam, a young woman living a fugitive life in the fictional land of Adria, which is set in medieval Western Europe circa 1350. She has a mysterious gift of healing and suffers persecution because of it.

== Plot summary ==
Miriam's parents expelled her at a young age because of her healing powers of healing, and she wandered for years. At the age of eighteen, Miriam falls into the hands of Catholic authorities, denounced as a witch. Grievously injured by her tormentors, Miriam escapes, and Mika, a traveling midwife, takes her in and nurses her back to health. After curing one of Mika's patients of eclampsia, Miriam goes on the run again. As she travels through the forest, she comes upon Baron Roger of Aurverelle, a nobleman out hunting who has been mauled by a bear. After she heals him, he rapes her and leaves her for dead. Inhabitants of Saint Brigid, one of the Free Towns, find her and summon Varden, an elf, to help heal her injuries.

While recovering in Saint Brigid, she realizes that the Elves have the power to change people. Formulating a plan for revenge on Baron Roger, she convinces Varden to perform a metamorphosis upon her to make her larger and stronger, able to engage in armed combat. Another Elf, Terrill, agrees to train her in the Elven way of swordfighting. The change goes as planned, but she comes to realize that it has made her not completely human, and she is gradually becoming an elf.

Aloysius Cranby, the bishop who had imprisoned Miriam, tracks her by imprisoning and interrogating Mika, the midwife and comes to Saint Brigid. After days of fruitless searching for Miriam the human, Cranby realizes that Miriam the elf is just one of several elves welcomed in the village when she kills one of his companions, though he never realizes the two Miriams are the same. Deeming this information more important than completing his original task, he flees the village, and Varden kills him to keep this secret safe.

Miriam persuades Terrill to go with her to free Mika from the Inquisition's prison. In a final full-contact sparring match with Terrill, Miriam concludes her transformation into an Elf. As a symbol of acceptance of her completed change, she formally takes the Elvish form of her name, Mirya. She and Terrill go on to infiltrate the prison. Using their Elven senses and agility to find humanly impossible ways of piercing the tight security, they make their way to the dungeon, free Mika, slaughter the inquisitors, and flee.

After leaving the city, Mirya, Mika, and Terrill return to Saint Brigid. Still unable to abandon her quest for vengeance, Mirya uses her Elven powers to search through all of the potential futures, and she forces into reality what had been only a dimly possible future, wherein Baron Roger and she can duel. As a result, Baron Roger conceives the idea of arranging a sham hawking trip in nearby Beldon forest, where Mirya will be waiting for him, so that he will have the privacy to violate a young woman in his care.

When Roger arrives, Mirya initiates a sword battle with him. Finally, Mirya prevails over him, wounding him mortally. Realizing only then that keeping him alive is better than killing him, she heals him and then uses her powers to remake his mind so that he is less aggressive, less ambitious, and committed to keeping the Free Towns safe.

== Characters in Strands of Starlight ==
=== Elves ===
- Varden - in some senses, a leader among elves. A healer of great power.
- Natil - it is implied in the series that she is the first and eldest of all the elves. Skilled at playing the wire-strung harp.
- Terrill - one of the few elves to carry a sword.
- Talla - only described as having curly red hair and blue eyes.
- Mirya - the human Miriam after her transformation.

=== Humans ===
- Miriam - a human with the gift of healing.
- Charity - a young girl who used to be the miserable Leather Woman before Varden reshaped her and gave her a second chance at life.
- Mika - a midwife who takes in Miriam after she escapes.
- Roxanne - a wise woman in the village of Saint Brigid. Varden's lover. Daughter of Francis and sister to Michael, Charlotte, and Kay.
- Aloysius Cranby
- Roger of Aurverelle - Baron of Aurverelle. A huge man, terrifically strong, prone to murder and rape with no conscience.
- Francis - the blacksmith of Saint Brigid. Kay and Roxanne's father.
- Kay - priest of Saint Brigid.
- George Darci
- Janet Darci - George's daughter.

== Historical figures and events mentioned in Strands of Starlight ==
- The Beghards
- The Brethren of the Free Spirit
- The Cathars
- The Cluniac order
- The Fraticelli
- John Hawkwood
- Hildegard of Bingen
- The Knights Templar
- The Minorites
- Pope Clement VI
- Pope Benedict XII

== Editions ==
- ISBN 0451453166 (US mass market paperback, 1989, New American Library, cover art by Thomas Canty)
- ISBN 0451163710 (US mass market paperback, 1989, Penguin Books, cover art by Thomas Canty)
- ASIN B000N4ZE2M (US mass market paperback, 1994, New American Library, cover art by Thomas Canty)
- ASIN B000LV9P9U (US mass market paperback, 1989, New American Library, cover art by Thomas Canty)
- ISBN 185723264X (UK mass market paperback, 1991, Futura Orbit)
- ISBN 0708848788 (UK mass market paperback, 1991, Futura Orbit)
- OCLC 58725476 (Audio book - Volunteer Services for the Visually Handicapped, 2005)
