= Plan B =

Plan B most commonly refers to:

- Contingency plan, a plan devised for an outcome other than in the expected plan.
- Plan B, a brand name of levonorgestrel, an emergency birth control drug

Plan B may also refer to:

== Film and television ==
- Plan B Entertainment, a film production company
- Plan B Productions, a motion picture company
- Plan B (2009 film), an Argentinean film by Marco Berger
- Plan B (2019 film), a Kenyan-Nigerian film by Lowladee
- Plan B (2021 film), an American comedy film
- Plan B (2024 film), an American comedy film
- Plan B (2017 TV series), a Canadian French-language television drama series
- Plan B (2023 TV series), a Canadian English-language television drama series adaptation of the 2017 series
- "Plan B" (Veronica Mars), a 2006 episode of the TV series Veronica Mars
- "Plan B" (30 Rock), an episode of the TV series 30 Rock
- "Plan B" (The Vampire Diaries), an episode of the TV series The Vampire Diaries

== Music ==
- Plan B (musician) (born 1983), British rapper, musician and film director (alias Ben Drew)
- Plan B (duo), a Puerto Rican reggaeton duo
- Plan B (band), a German rock band
- Plan B (Huey Lewis and the News album), 2001
- Plan B (Too Phat album), 2001
- Plan B (Scorn album), 2002
- "Plan B" (song), a song by Megan Thee Stallion
- "Plan B", a song from the album Too-Rye-Ay by Dexys Midnight Runners
- Plan B, the debut album by the experimental post-hardcore band A Lot Like Birds

== Published media ==
- Plan B (magazine), a monthly music magazine
- Plan B 2.0: Rescuing a Planet Under Stress and a Civilization in Trouble, a 2006 book by Lester R. Brown
- Plan B (novel), a 1993 novel by Chester Himes
- Plan B, a novel set in the Liaden universe
- Plan B, a 2005 novel by Emily Barr

== Other ==
- Plan B free agency, a concept in the National Football League
- Plan B Skateboards, a skateboarding company
- Plan B Toys, a company based in Ohio, United States
- Plan B (charity), a British climate litigation organisation, also known as 'Plan B. Earth'
- Plan B, a derivative or fork of Plan 9 from Bell Labs

== See also ==
- B (disambiguation)
