= The Persistence of Memory (short story) =

- Short story by Gael Baudino
- Country: United States
- Language: English
- Genre(s): Fantasy

Publication
- Published in: The Magazine of Fantasy and Science Fiction
- Publication type: Periodical
- Media type: Print (Magazine)
- Publication date: November 1985

"The Persistence of Memory" is a short story by American writer Gael Baudino concerning Barbara, a pregnant housewife, who begins seeing things she had not noticed before when she starts doing special memory exercises developed by her husband, Frank, and the effects it has on her personal and family life.

In 1989 this story was adapted into a graphic story for the book The Bank Street Book of Fantasy.

The title is taken from the painting The Persistence of Memory by Salvador Dalí.
