= Duel of Dragons =

1991 novel by Gael Baudino

- Front cover of Duel of Dragons
- Author: Gael Baudino
- Language: English
- Series: The Dragonsword Series
- Genre: Fantasy novel
- Publisher: Roc Books
- Publication date: 1991
- Publication place: United States
- Media type: Print (Paperback)
- ISBN: 0-451-45097-3
- OCLC: 24209433
- Preceded by: Dragonsword
- Followed by: Dragon Death

Duel of Dragons is a novel written by Gael Baudino and published in 1991. It is the second in the Dragonsword Trilogy. The other novels are Dragonsword (1989) and Dragon Death (1992).

== Plot introduction ==
The protagonist of Duel of Dragons is Suzanne Helling, a young woman living in 1980 Los Angeles, California, USA. She is taken away to the land of Gryylth and transformed into the warrior Alouzon Dragonmaster.

== Plot summary ==
The story picks up a few weeks after Suzanne has returned to Los Angeles from Gryylth. Silbakor has returned with her and poses as statuette in a glass paperweight. Though she carries Silbakor around with her and can return to Gryylth at will, she finds she cannot bring herself to do it.

One night, she has a dream that Solomon Braithwaite has risen from the grave and is trying to tell her something. The following day, she gets a phone call from Helen Addams, Solomon's ex-wife. She too had the dream and wanted to know what its meaning was. Suzanne visits her that night, and while there, they are attacked by the White Worm, Silbakor's antithesis.

They flee on Silbakor and arrive in Gryylth to find that eighteen months have passed. Suzanne takes on her familiar persona of Alouzon. Helen takes on the persona of Kyria, a sorceress, but she finds herself battling between her own vitriolic personality and Kyria's more peaceable personality.

The Gryylthians and the Dremords have made peace and are working together to make it through a difficult winter. Word comes that the town of Bandon has been destroyed by unknown means. When Alouzon and Kyria examine the wreckage, they see that modern weapons had been used: fighter jets, helicopters, napalm, rockets, machine guns, and bombs. The leaders conclude that the new land of Vaylle is responsible and decide to send a team to explore the new land and learn if they are responsible.

Alouzon leads the team, consisting of soldiers from Gryylth and Corrin, Kyria, and Helwych, a Corrinian sorcerer, across the ocean. Landing, they find that Vaylle is an idyllic pacifist nation that worships a God and a Goddess: Solomon and Suzanne. Its king is a lame man known as King Pellam. There, they decide to split up: Helwych will stay behind in the capital city, and the rest of the party will continue across the mountains.

When the party gets close to the mountains, Marrget, one of their party, is kidnapped by the Greyfaces, who are nameless and faceless soldiers in uniforms and gas masks. Following, the party finds themselves in a larger version of the Blasted Heath. When they split up, the Heath tests them with the embodiment of their worst fears. Alouzon and Kyria finally track down the source of the attacks: the Spectre, who embodies Suzanne's worst subconscious feelings about both war and Solomon Braithwaite.

Alouzon and Kyria battle the Spectre, with Kyria striking a decisive blow using her memories of being Solomon's wife. In the aftermath, Helen's persona dies and Kyria's takes over for good. Alouzon flees on Silbakor and is attacked by the White Worm. Falling off Silbakor, she wakes up in Los Angeles, but in Alouzon's body, not Suzanne's.

== Editions ==
- ISBN 0451450973 (US mass market paperback, 1991, Roc books)
