= E-flat =

E-flat may refer to:

- E♭ (musical note)
- E-flat major
- E-flat minor
- E-flat tuning, on a guitar
- "E Flat Boogie", a 1980 single by American funk band Trouble Funk

== See also ==
- E-flat clarinet
- EB (disambiguation)
