= B (disambiguation) =

B is the second letter of the Latin alphabet.

B may also refer to:

== Arts and media ==
=== Music ===
==== Musical notation ====
- B (musical note)
- B major, a scale
- B minor, a scale
- B major chord, Chord names and symbols (popular music)
- ♭ Flat (music), a note lower in pitch by a semitone

==== Performers ====
- Beyoncé
- B, member of Superorganism (band)

==== Recordings ====
- B (BamBam EP), an extended play by BamBam
- B (Battles EP), an extended play by Battles
- B (I Am Kloot album), a compilation album by I Am Kloot
- b (Moxy Früvous EP), an extended play by Moxy Früvous
- "b", an Iamamiwhoami song
- "B", a song by Todrick Hall from his 2018 album Forbidden

=== Other media ===
- /b/, a board on 4chan
- b (newspaper), a free daily, tabloid sized newspaper, published by The Baltimore Sun
- Codex Vaticanus Graecus 1209, an ancient bible
- Rajawali Televisi, previously named B Channel, a television channel in Indonesia
- B, the production code for the 1963–64 Doctor Who serial The Daleks
- B, a character in Total Drama: Revenge of the Island
- "B" Is for Burglar, the second novel in Sue Grafton's Alphabet Mystery series, published in 1985

== Linguistics ==
- В, a letter of the Cyrillic alphabet
- Voiced bilabial stop (b, in the International Phonetic Alphabet)

== Places ==
- Belgium, on the vehicle registration plates of the European Union
- Bucharest, on the vehicle registration plates of Romania

== Science, technology, and mathematics ==
=== Astronomy ===
- Astronomical objects in the Barnard list of dark nebulae (abbreviation B)
- Latitude (b) in the galactic coordinate system

=== Biology and medicine ===
- Haplogroup B (mtDNA), a human mitochondrial DNA (mtDNA) haplogroup
- Haplogroup B (Y-DNA), a Y-chromosomal DNA (Y-DNA) haplogroup
- Blood type B
- ATC code B Blood and blood forming organs, a section of the Anatomical Therapeutic Chemical Classification System
- Vitamin B
- Hepatitis B
- Berlin Botanical Garden and Botanical Museum, assigned the abbreviation B as a repository of herbarium specimens

=== Computing ===
- B (programming language)
- B-Method, for computer software development
- B-tree, a data structure
- Bit (b)
- Byte (B)
- <b></b>, an HTML element denoting bold text

=== Physical and chemical quantities and units ===
- One of the reciprocal lattice vectors (b*)
- Breadth (b); see length
- Impact parameter (b)
- Molality (b)
- Barn (unit) (b), a unit of area
- Magnetic field (B)
- Napierian absorbance (B)
- Rotational constant (B)
- Second virial coefficient (B)
- Susceptance (B)
- Bel (B), a logarithmic unit equal to ten decibels
- Bethe (B), an unused name for the foe (equal to 10^{51} ergs)

=== Other uses in science, technology, and mathematics ===
- B, a modal logic
- bottom quark (symbol: b), an elementary particle
- B meson, a type of meson
- Boolean domain ($\mathbb{B}$), in mathematics
- Boron, symbol B, a chemical element
- Bulb (photography), a shutter-speed setting
- B battery, a battery used to provide the plate voltage of a vacuum tube
- B horizon, a layer of soil commonly known as subsoil
- B, B+ and B−, expressions of buoyancy in convective available potential energy

== Sport ==
- Australian rules football positions#Full back, in Australian Rules football
- B, often used after the name of football clubs to denote a reserve team

== Transportation ==
- B (New York City Subway service)
- B Line (Los Angeles Metro)
- B (SEPTA Metro)
- Line B (Buenos Aires Metro)
- B (S-train), in Copenhagen
- RER B, a line in the RER of Paris
- The West Japan Railway Company service symbol for:
  - Kosei Line
  - Inbi Line
  - Kabe Line
- Bundesstraße (federal highway) in Austria and Germany (abbreviation B)
- Bayshore Route of Shuto Expressway in Japan, numbered as route B
- Mexico City Metro Line B
- Jadetabek (vehicle registration prefix B)

== Other uses ==
- B (grade), for evaluation of students' work
- B (bank), a banking brand in the United Kingdom
- Barnabites (Latin: Clerici Regulares Sancti Pauli), a religious order abbreviated to the postnominal B.
- Bravo, the military time zone code for UTC+02:00
- Brutus, a Roman cognomen (abbreviation B)
- Farmall B, a tractor produced by International Harvester from 1939 to 1947
- Dominical letter B for a common year starting on Saturday
- B, a soft grade of pencil lead
- b, American actor in You

== See also ==
- B postcode area (United Kingdom)
- B class (disambiguation)
- Class B (disambiguation)
- B1 (disambiguation)
- B2 (disambiguation)
- Be (disambiguation)
- Bea (disambiguation)
- Bee (disambiguation)
- Bet (disambiguation)
- Beta (disambiguation)
- BB (disambiguation)
- BBB (disambiguation)
- Plan B (disambiguation)
