= 4B =

4B may refer to:

- 4B movement, South Korean radical feminist movement
- "4B", a song by Terminaator from Minu väike paradiis
- 4B, the production code for the 1975 Doctor Who serial The Sontaran Experiment
- 4B, a very soft grade of pencil lead

== See also ==
- Long March 4B, a Chinese orbital carrier rocket
- Oflag IV-B Koenigstein, a German prisoner of war camp
- Stalag IV-B, a German prisoner of war camp
- B4 (disambiguation)
