= Vitamin B4 =

Vitamin B_{4} is a former designation given to several distinct chemical compounds, none of which is currently considered a true vitamin:

- Choline is synthesized by the human body, but not sufficiently to maintain good health, and is now considered an essential dietary nutrient.
- Adenine is a nucleobase synthesized by the human body.
- Carnitine is an essential dietary nutrient for certain worms, but not for humans.
