= 3B Lab =

Japanese punk rock group

3B Lab (3B Lab, surī bī labo), often stylized "3B LAB.☆", "3B Lab.Star", or "3B Lab.s", is a Japanese punk rock group. Its members are Okahira Kenji who used to be in 19, Chiba Takatoshi who provided musics for Kawahara Ayako, Tamakoshi Masahiro, and Uneoki Shuji.

== History ==
This punk rock band was formed in 2001 by Okahira Kenji, Chiba Takatoshi, and Tamakoshi Masahiro. They released their first album a year later under that name and their popularity increased.

Before their debut their name was " 3B Lab☆ " because there were three members (Kenji/Chiba/Tamakoshi) and each member had B-type blood (the " ☆ " represents a star which will brighten the future). Two members, Uneoki Shuji and Shoji, came later on because it was said that they needed some help playing at their lives. This, of course, wouldn't make sense if their name was still " 3B Lab☆" with five members, so they added the "s" at the end, and became 3b Lab☆s.

Current members of 3B Lab:

- Kenji Okahira - vocal/harmonica/guitar
- Chiba Takatoshi - leader/bass
- Tamakoshi Masahiro - drums
- Shuji Uneoki - guitar

== Discography ==
=== Singles ===
- 'Ichigo Ichie' (19 February 2003)
- 'Purezento' (25 June 2003)
- 'Hoshi no Suna' (21 November 2003)
- 'Seishun Oka' (24 March 2004)
- 'Aa Hatsukoi' (22 September 2004)
- 'Let's HappiecE Life!' (April 6, 2005)
- 'FANTASIA' (January 11, 2006)
- 'Koiuta - Shunka Shuto' (March 14, 2007)
- 'Hikari' (June 6, 2007)

=== Albums ===
- 3B LAB.☆ (21 November 2002)
- LABORATORY No. 1 (23 July 2003)
- HEART BREAK No. 2 (19 May 2004)
- Tasogare EVOLUTION No. 3 (June 22, 2005)
- Friendship No. 4 (March 29, 2006)
- 'Nippon No. 5' (June 4, 2007)

=== DVD ===
- PV LAB.☆ (24 March 2004)
- PV LAB.☆#2 (19 September 2007)
