= Tiendas 3B =

Mexican discount stores company

3B logo

A store in Aguascalientes

Tiendas 3B is a chain of discount stores in Mexico. It was founded in 2004 in Mexico City by the Chilean businessman Anthony Hatoum, with the slogan Bueno, bonito y barato ('Good, Nice, and Cheap'). Tiendas 3B sells store brands. By 2026, it had 3,469 stores throughout Mexico.
