= EB =

EB or Eb may refer to:

== Arts, entertainment, and media ==
- E-flat (disambiguation), the note "E♭" and related items
- Eat Bulaga!, a Philippine television variety show
- Eb Dawson, a fictional character of the TV series Green Acres
- Encyclopædia Britannica, a general knowledge English-language encyclopaedia
- Europa Barbarorum, a modification of the computer game Rome: Total War

== Brands and enterprises ==
- EB (beer), Polish beer
- "EB", the maker's mark on clay pipes manufactured by Eduard Bird
- EB, the logo of the French car manufacturer Bugatti, based on the symbols of its founder, Ettore Bugatti
- EB, the symbol listed on the NYSE (New York Stock Exchange) for Eventbrite, Inc.
- EB Games, formerly known as Electronics Boutique, a computer and video games retailer
- Eggland's Best, a product of Cal-Maine
- Elektrisk Bureau, a Norwegian electrical equipment manufacturer
- Energizer Bunny, mascot of Energizer
- Exclusive Books, a South African bookseller chain
- ExpressBus, a Finnish bus transport brand

== People ==
- E. B. Farnum, one of the first residents of Deadwood, South Dakota, owner of the Grand Central Hotel, and the town's first mayor; on the HBO television series Deadwood and Deadwood: The Movie, his character is referred to as "E.B."
- E. B. White (1899–1985), writer, author of children's books Stuart Little and Charlotte's Web, co-author of Strunk & White's The Elements of Style

== Science and technology ==
- Embryoid body, a structure adopted by stem cells during their differentiation in suspension
- Epidermolysis bullosa, a rare genetic disease
- Epstein–Barr virus, one of the most common viruses in humans
- Exabit (Eb), a unit of information used, for example, to quantify computer memory or storage capacity
- Exabyte (EB), a unit of information used, for example, to quantify computer memory or storage capacity

== Other uses ==
- Bureau of Economic and Business Affairs, in the U.S. Department of State
- EB (train), a cabless second unit of an EMD EA/EB diesel locomotive
- EB/Streymur, a Faroese football team
  - Eiðis Bóltfelag, a Faroese sports club whose football section was merged with Streymur to form EB/Streymur in 1993
- European Baccalaureate, a degree given on completion of the last year of attendance at the European School
- The Indonesian islands of Flores, Alor and Lembata (vehicle registration prefix EB)
