= Baseball Boss =

Online baseball video game

Baseball Boss Team Editor

Baseball Boss (also known as BaseballBoss and abbreviated to BBB) was a web based, free online MMOG (massively multiplayer online game) baseball game published by Challenge Games. Baseball Boss is also an official licensee of Major League Baseball Advanced Media. The game combined virtual baseball card collecting and fantasy baseball simulation through head to head completion against historical teams and other online players. The game was released on July 10, 2008. Players were given cards of real baseball players from all of baseball's ages (card sets range from 1907 to the 2009 MLB All Star Game) to create teams of players using their cards. Players then attempted to move up "classes," from Rookie to Hall of Fame by defeating other players' teams through simulated challenges. Players spent tickets, earned for sending challenges to other teams, to purchase new packs of cards from the Market or new cards from other users in the Auction House. Baseball Boss features two brands of cards, the "National" base brand and the "Spire" premium brand. In addition to playing against other online users, Baseball Boss allowed users to collect entire sets or a group of their favorite cards in a way that resembled virtual baseball card collecting, using "Shoeboxes".

Baseball Boss shut down operations on March 10, 2010 when the sponsor, Challenge Games, was unable to license certain rights from Major League Baseball. In June 2010 Challenge Games was purchased by Zynga.

== The Cards ==
Virtual baseball cards were a central part of the Baseball Boss game experience. A player's virtual baseball card collection was used to build their team's rosters. Like real life baseball players, each baseball player card has ratings and abilities that affect the outcome of game play. The card's ratings and abilities were based upon historical statistics for that real life baseball player in a given year. Each card also had a rarity tier and a corresponding color. This attribute measured how rare the card was within the overall distribution of the game. Tier 1 cards were the most common, and Tier 7 cards were the rarest.

The color system is as follows:

• Tier 1 – Grey
• Tier 2 – White
• Tier 3 – Green
• Tier 4 – Blue
• Tier 5 – Purple
• Tier 6 – Orange
• Tier 7 – Red

Baseball Boss offered two brands of cards, Spire and National. Both of these card brands also had attributes that affected game play. For example, Tier 6 and 7 cards were only available in a Spire brand.

== Managing Teams ==
An owner played the role of both general manager and manager for each team they create. A team's roster contained up to 25 players and is built from an owner's baseball card collection. The owner then set fielding positions, batting lineups, starting rotations and bullpen assignments. After these decisions are made, the owner's team wa ready to compete against other players with a number of game types.

== Game Currencies ==
• Challenge Coins – Challenge Coins wee the virtual currency of Challenge Online Games. They were used to acquire items and services in any of their free-to-play online titles. Challenge Coins could be purchased with real money or exchanged for tickets in Baseball Boss in the game's currency exchange.
• Tickets - Tickets were the official in-game currency of Baseball Boss. Tickets were generated from playing various game types and milestones. Tickets were used to purchase packs and other items from the Card Store.

== Baseball Boss Membership ==
Players could buy memberships to the game. Members gained multiple benefits, including an unlimited number of card collection slots, and weekly stipends of packs and Challenge Coins.

== End Game ==
Challenge Games ceased operations with Baseball Boss effective March 10, 2010. Exact details could not be provided per standard procedures in relation to the game.
