= 1967 North Indian Ocean cyclone season =

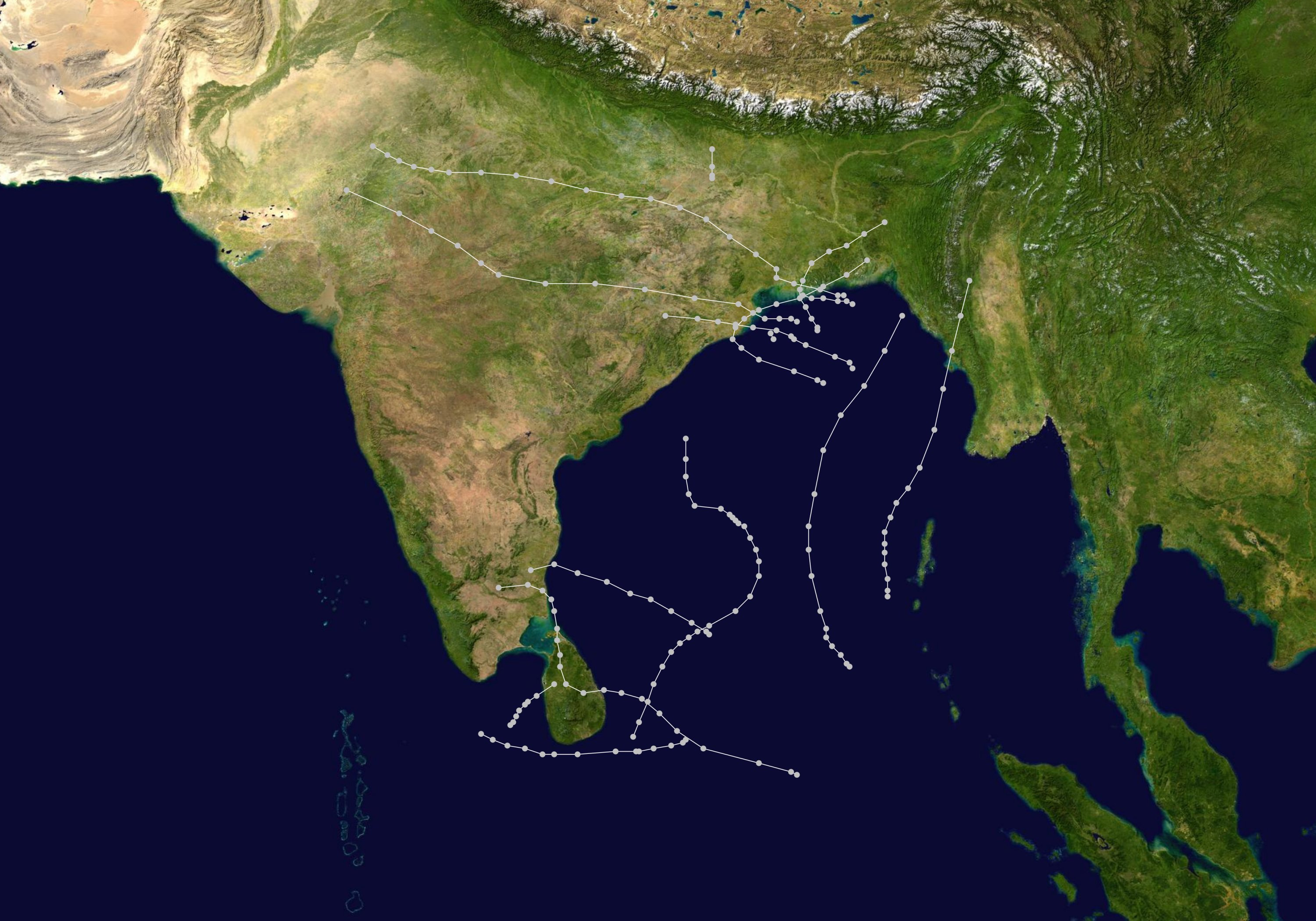
- Season summary map

Seasonal boundaries
- First system formed: January 1, 1967
- Last system dissipated: December 8, 1967

Seasonal statistics
- Depressions: 15
- Cyclonic storms: 6
- Severe cyclonic storms: 4
- Total fatalities: Unknown
- Total damage: Unknown

Related articles
- 1967 Atlantic hurricane season; 1967 Pacific hurricane season; 1967 Pacific typhoon season

The 1967 North Indian Ocean cyclone season had no bounds, but cyclones tend to form between April and December, with peaks in May and November. These dates conventionally delimit the period of each year when most tropical cyclones form in the northern Indian Ocean. There are two main seas in the North Indian Ocean—the Bay of Bengal to the east of the Indian subcontinent and the Arabian Sea to the west of India. The official Regional Specialized Meteorological Centre in this basin is the India Meteorological Department (IMD), while the Joint Typhoon Warning Center releases unofficial advisories. An average of four to six storms form in the North Indian Ocean every season with peaks in May and November. Cyclones occurring between the meridians 45°E and 100°E are included in the season by the IMD.

== Systems ==
=== Depression One (01B) ===
- Tropical depression (SSHWS)
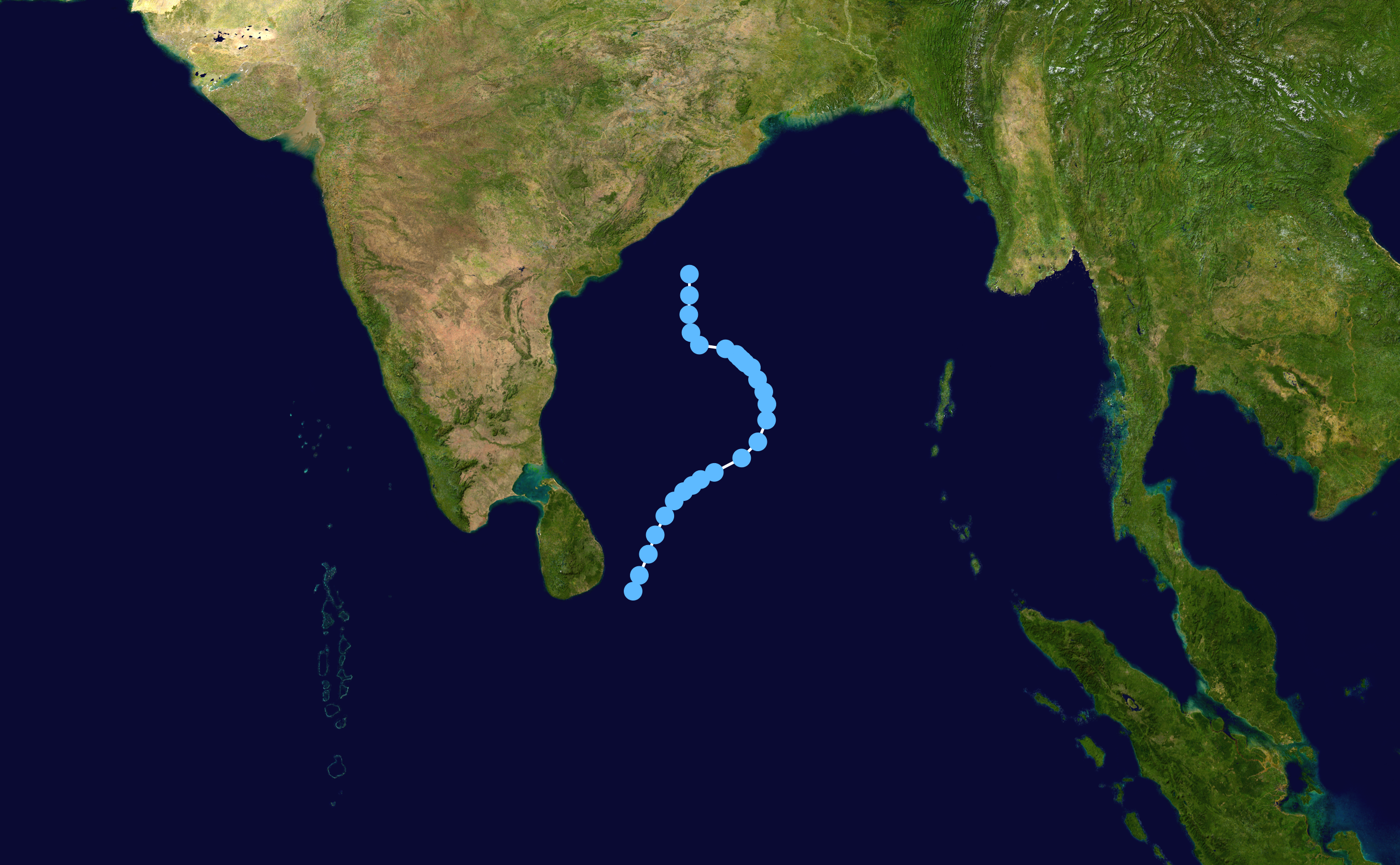
- Duration: January 1 – January 7
- Peak intensity: 45 km/h (30 mph) (1-min);

This storm moved from south to north.

=== Cyclone Two (02B) ===
- Severe cyclonic storm (IMD)
- Category 1 tropical cyclone (SSHWS)
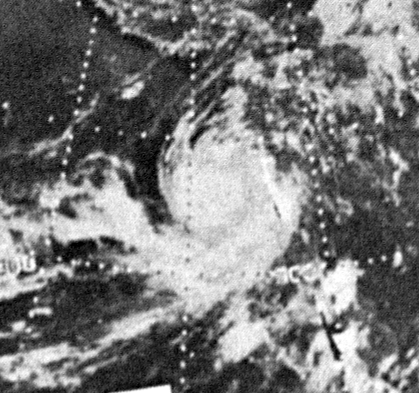
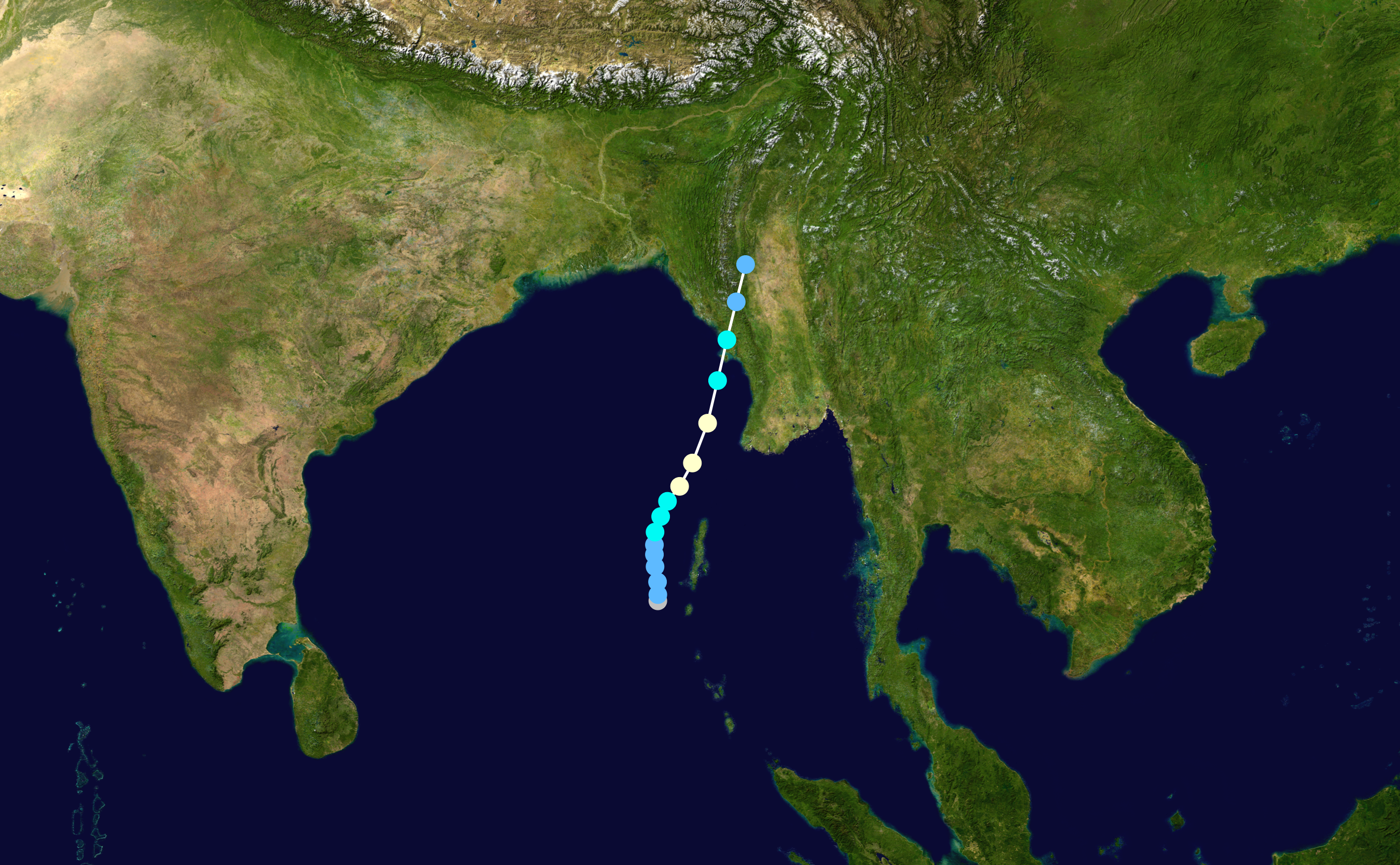
- Duration: May 14 – May 18
- Peak intensity: 100 km/h (65 mph) (3-min);

This storm moved from south to north.

=== Depression Three (03B) ===
- Depression (IMD)
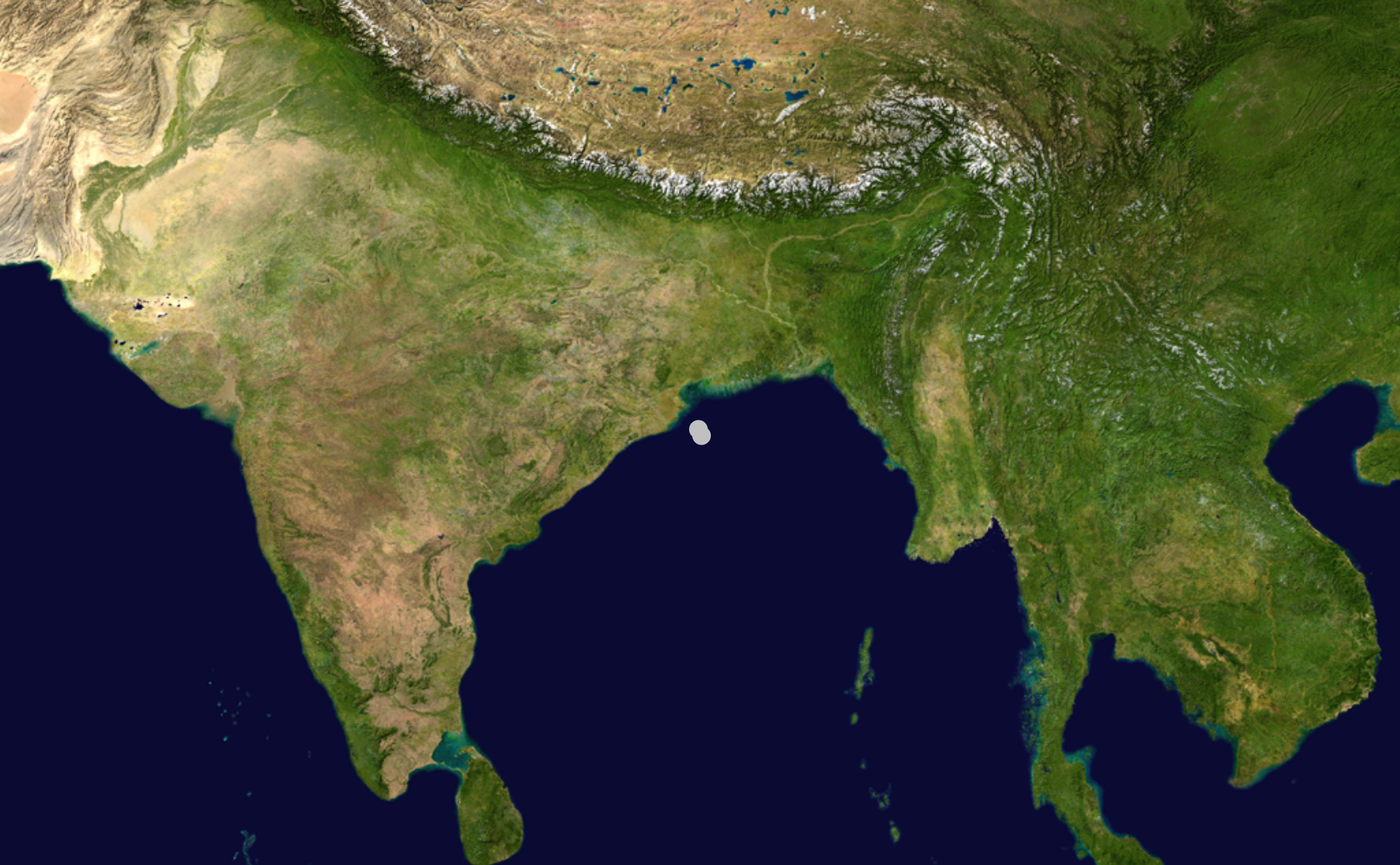
- Duration: June 28 – June 29
- Peak intensity: Winds not specified;

This depression moved from south to north.

=== Depression Four (04B) ===
- Tropical depression (SSHWS)
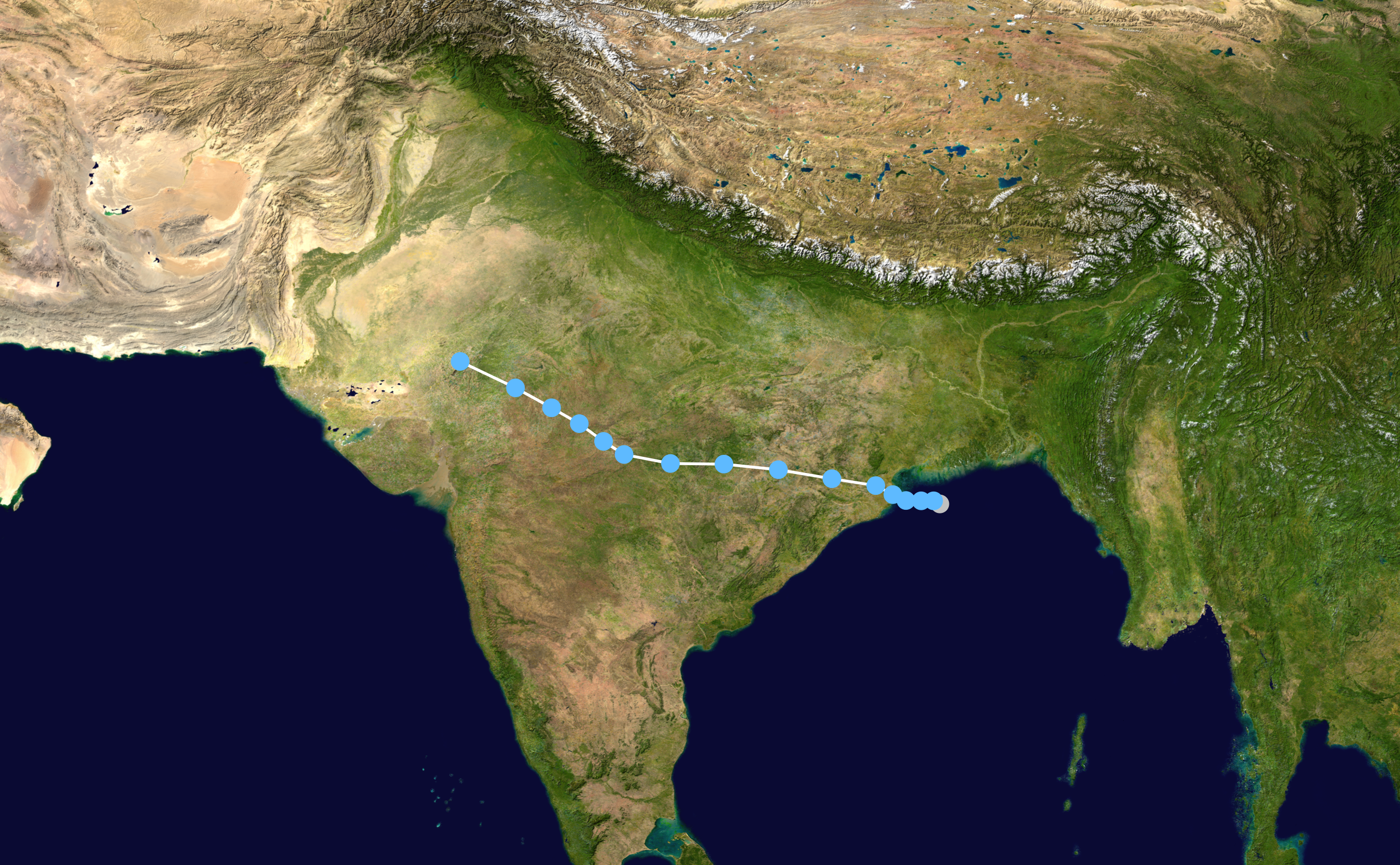
- Duration: July 25 – July 29
- Peak intensity: 45 km/h (30 mph) (1-min);

This depression moved from east to west.

=== Depression Five (05B) ===
- Tropical depression (SSHWS)
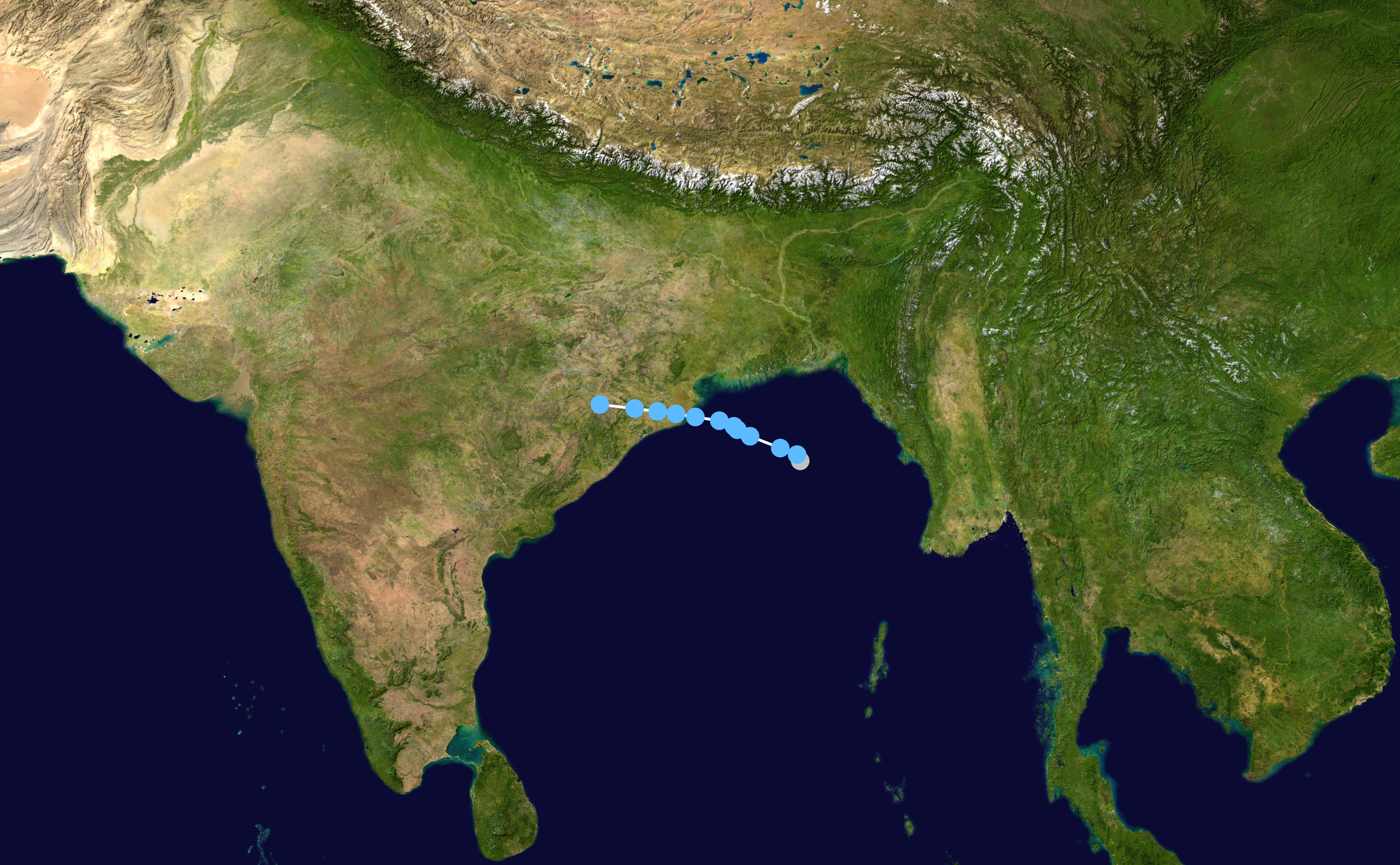
- Duration: July 30 – August 2
- Peak intensity: 45 km/h (30 mph) (1-min);

This depression moved from east to west.

=== Depression Six (06B) ===
- Tropical depression (SSHWS)
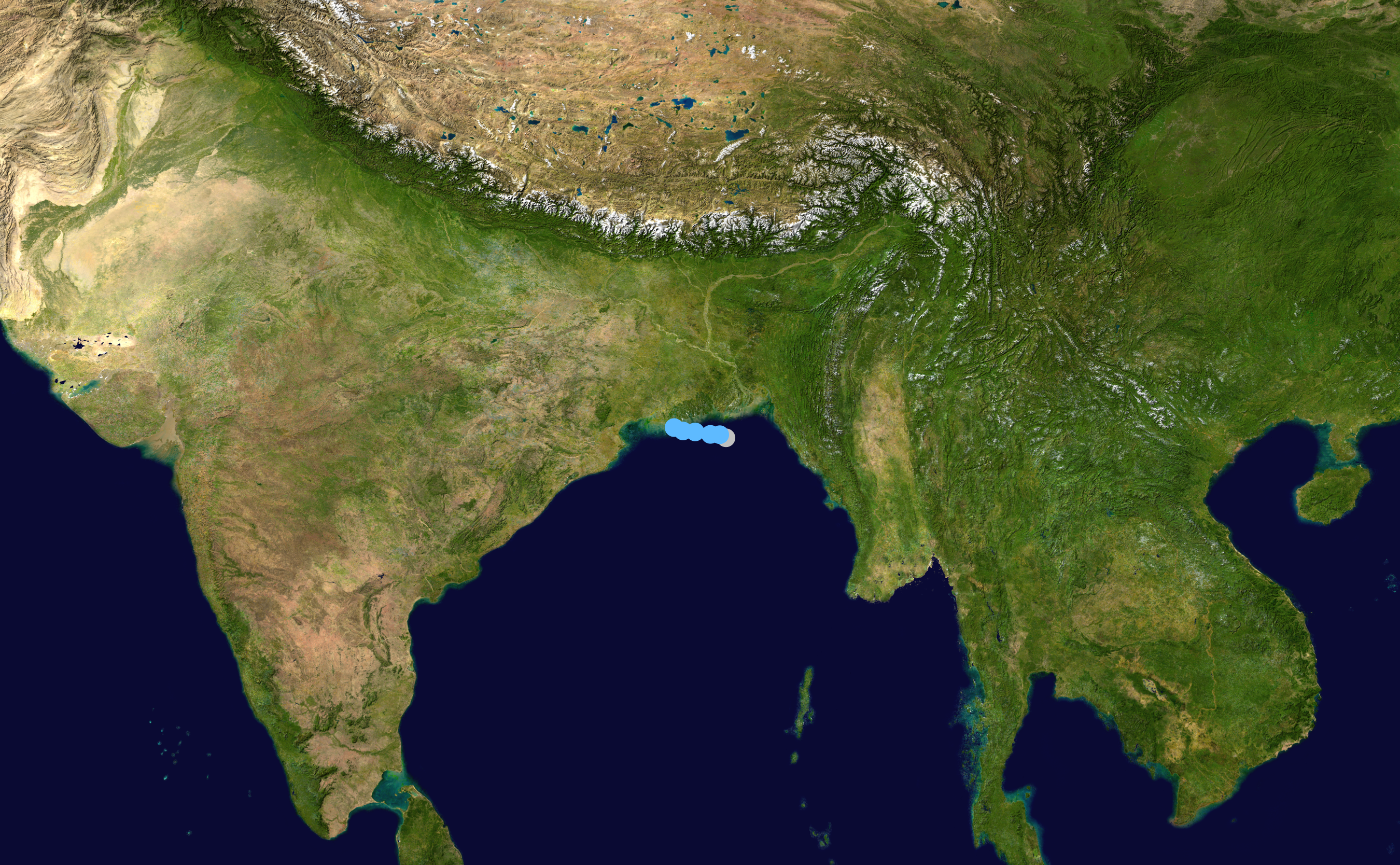
- Duration: August 17 – August 19
- Peak intensity: 45 km/h (30 mph) (1-min);

This depression moved from east to west.

=== Depression Seven (07B) ===
- Tropical depression (SSHWS)
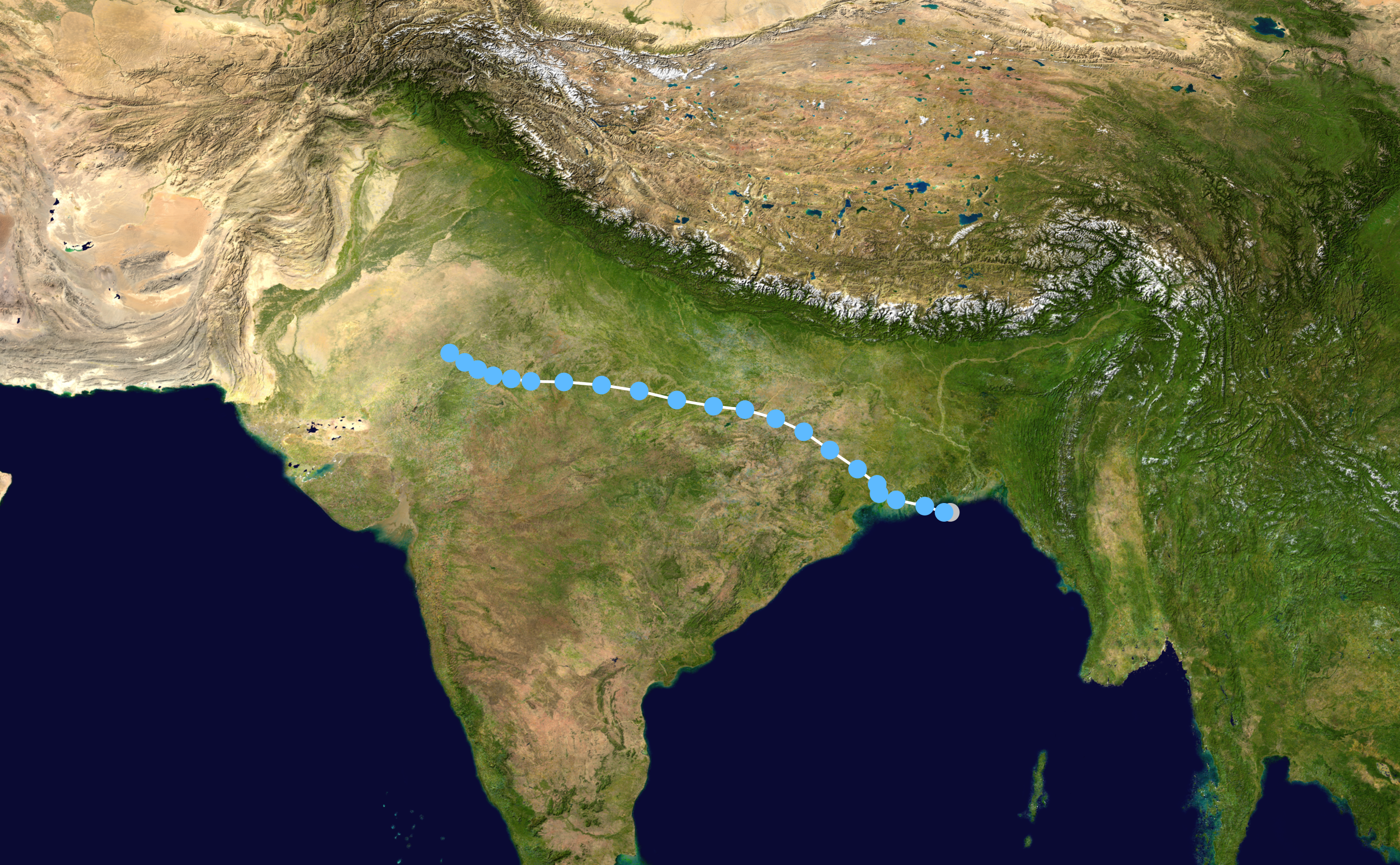
- Duration: September 1 – September 7
- Peak intensity: 45 km/h (30 mph) (1-min);

This depression moved from east to west.

=== Depression Eight (08B) ===
- Depression (IMD)
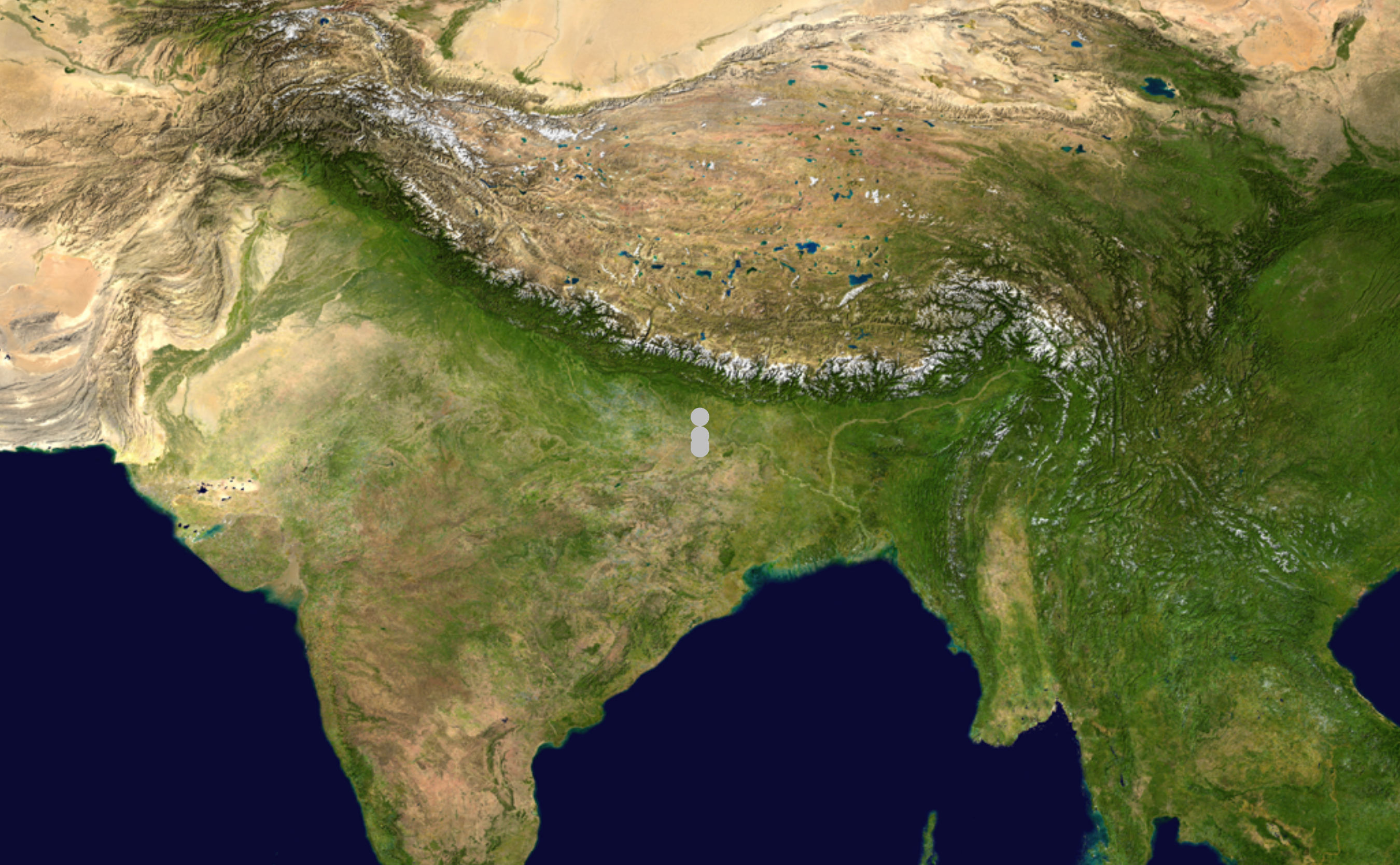
- Duration: September 19 – September 20
- Peak intensity: Winds not specified;

This depression moved from south to north.

=== Depression Nine (09B) ===
- Tropical depression (SSHWS)
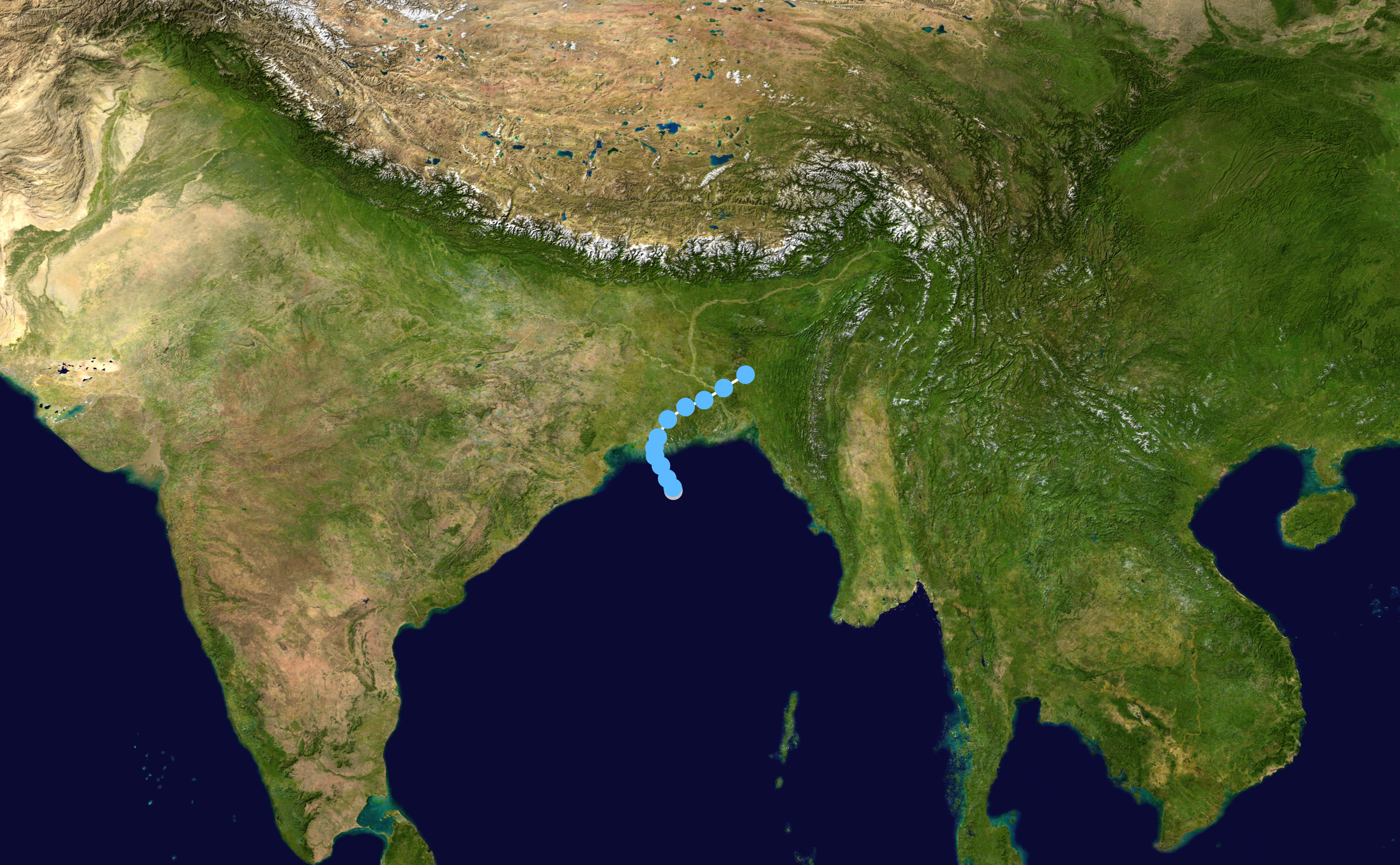
- Duration: September 26 – September 29
- Peak intensity: 45 km/h (30 mph) (1-min);

This depression moved from south to north.

=== Cyclone Ten (10B) ===
- Category 1 tropical cyclone (SSHWS)
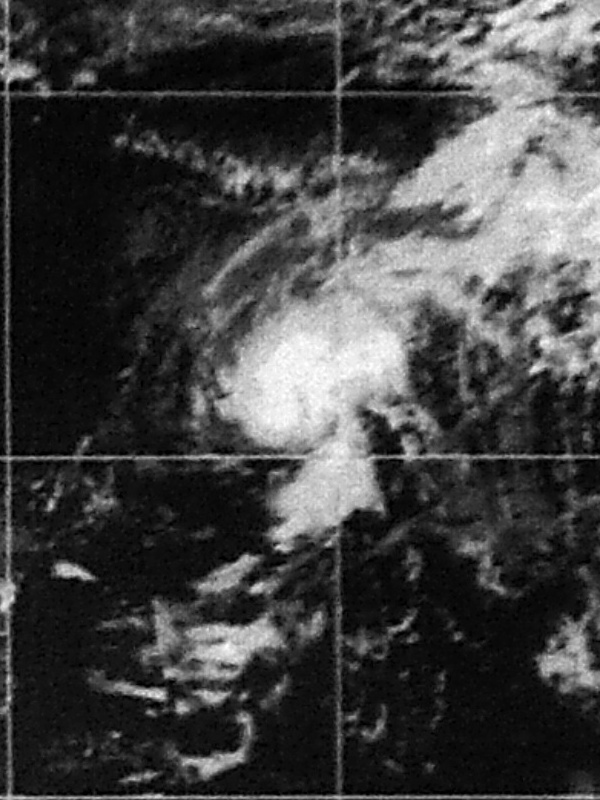
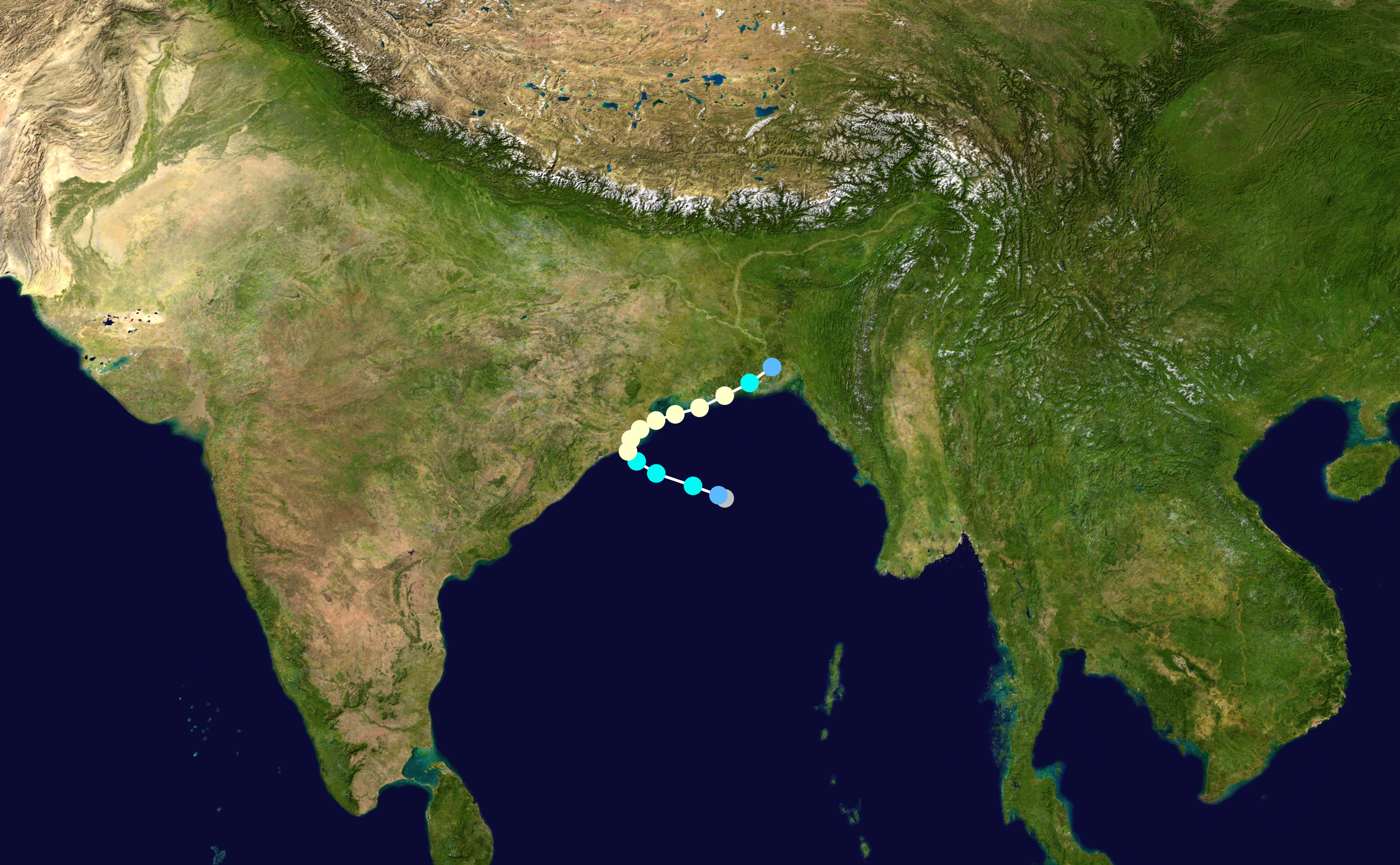
- Duration: October 7 – October 11
- Peak intensity: 120 km/h (75 mph) (1-min);

On October 12, an intense cyclone struck the state of Odisha and left complete devastation along its path. The storm moved from southwest to northeast.

=== Tropical Storm Eleven (11B) ===
- Tropical storm (SSHWS)
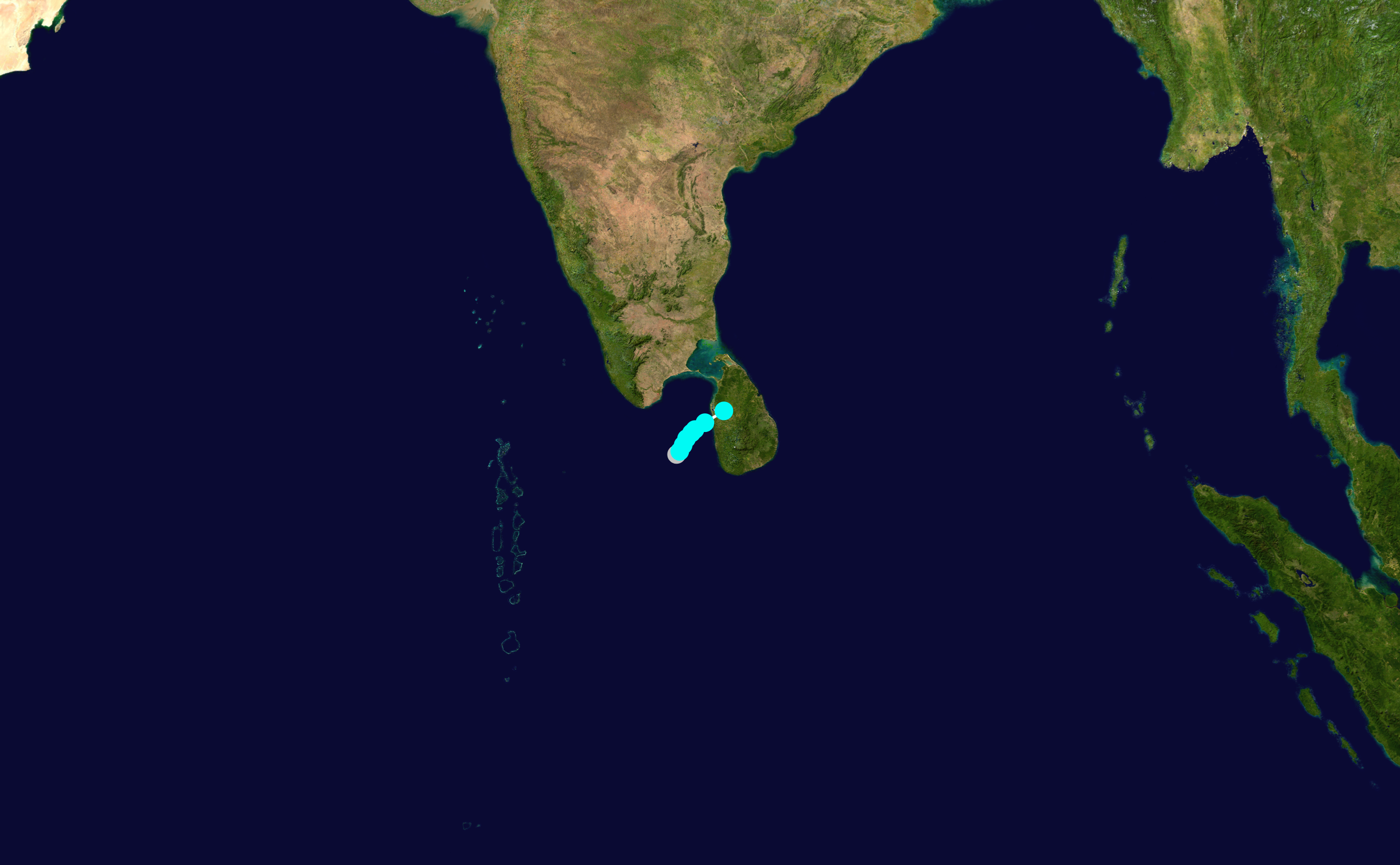
- Duration: October 19 – October 21
- Peak intensity: 65 km/h (40 mph) (1-min);

This tropical storm moved from east to west and made a tropical storm-force landfall on Sri Lanka.

=== Cyclone Twelve (12B) ===
- Category 1 tropical cyclone (SSHWS)
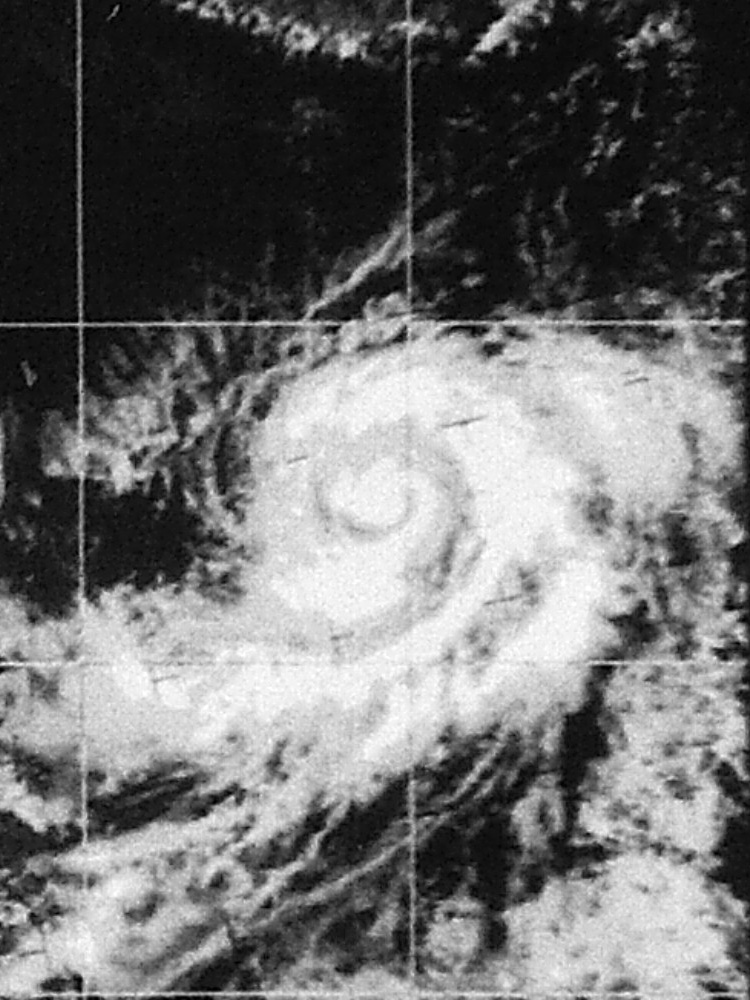
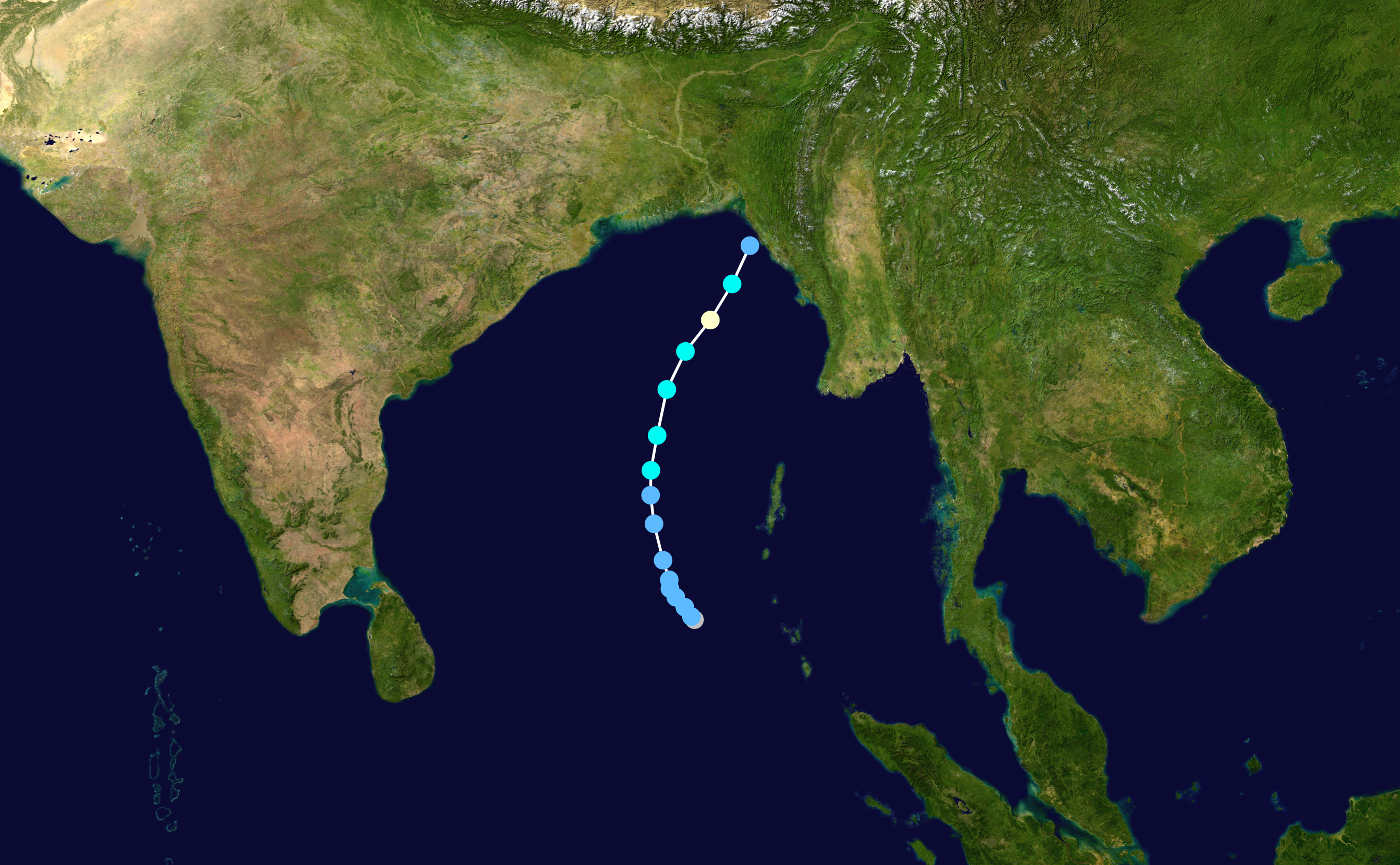
- Duration: October 19 – October 23
- Peak intensity: 120 km/h (75 mph) (1-min);

This cyclone moved from south to north.

=== Depression Thirteen (13B) ===
- Tropical depression (SSHWS)
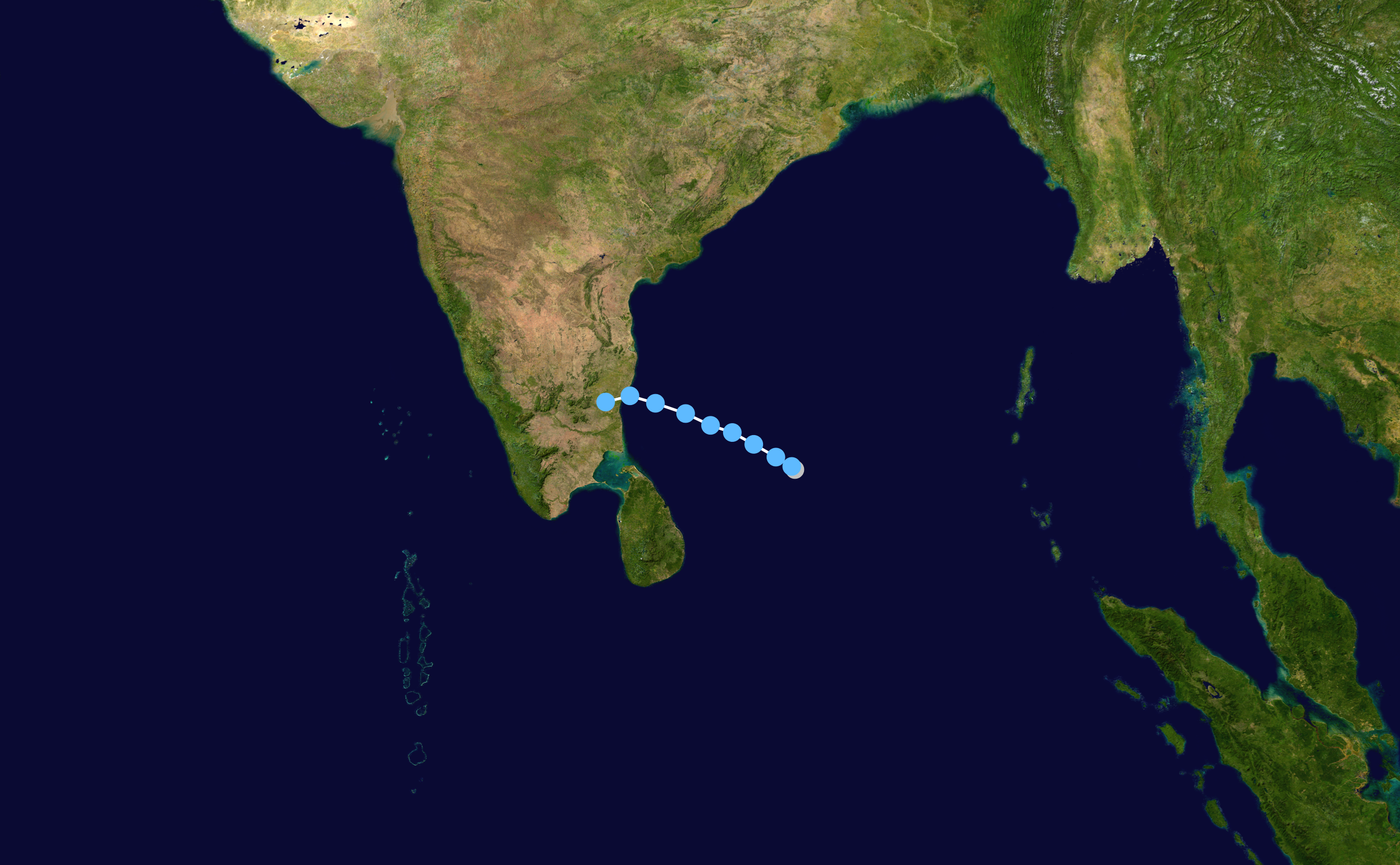
- Duration: October 30 – November 2
- Peak intensity: 45 km/h (30 mph) (1-min);

This storm moved from east to west.

=== Depression Fourteen (14B) ===
- Tropical depression (SSHWS)
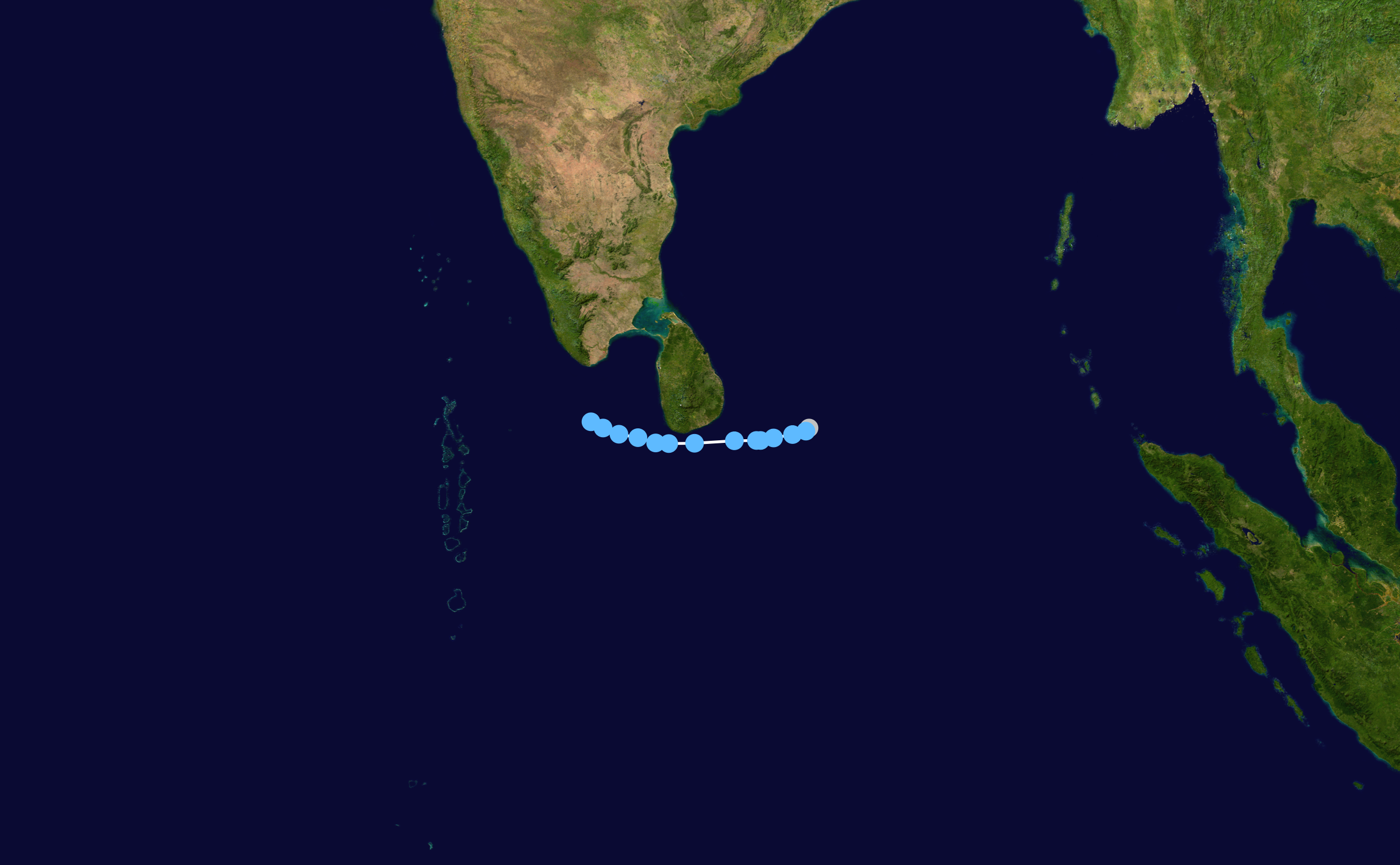
- Duration: November 26 – November 30
- Peak intensity: 45 km/h (30 mph) (1-min);

This storm moved from east to west.

=== Cyclone Fifteen (15B) ===
- Category 1 tropical cyclone (SSHWS)
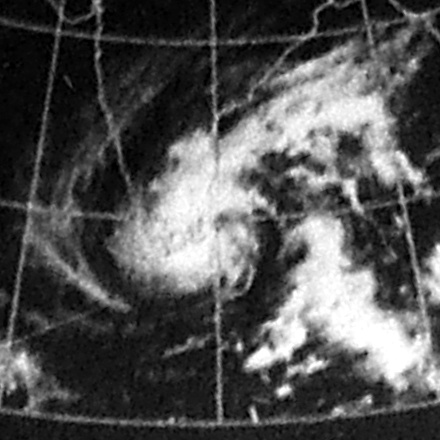
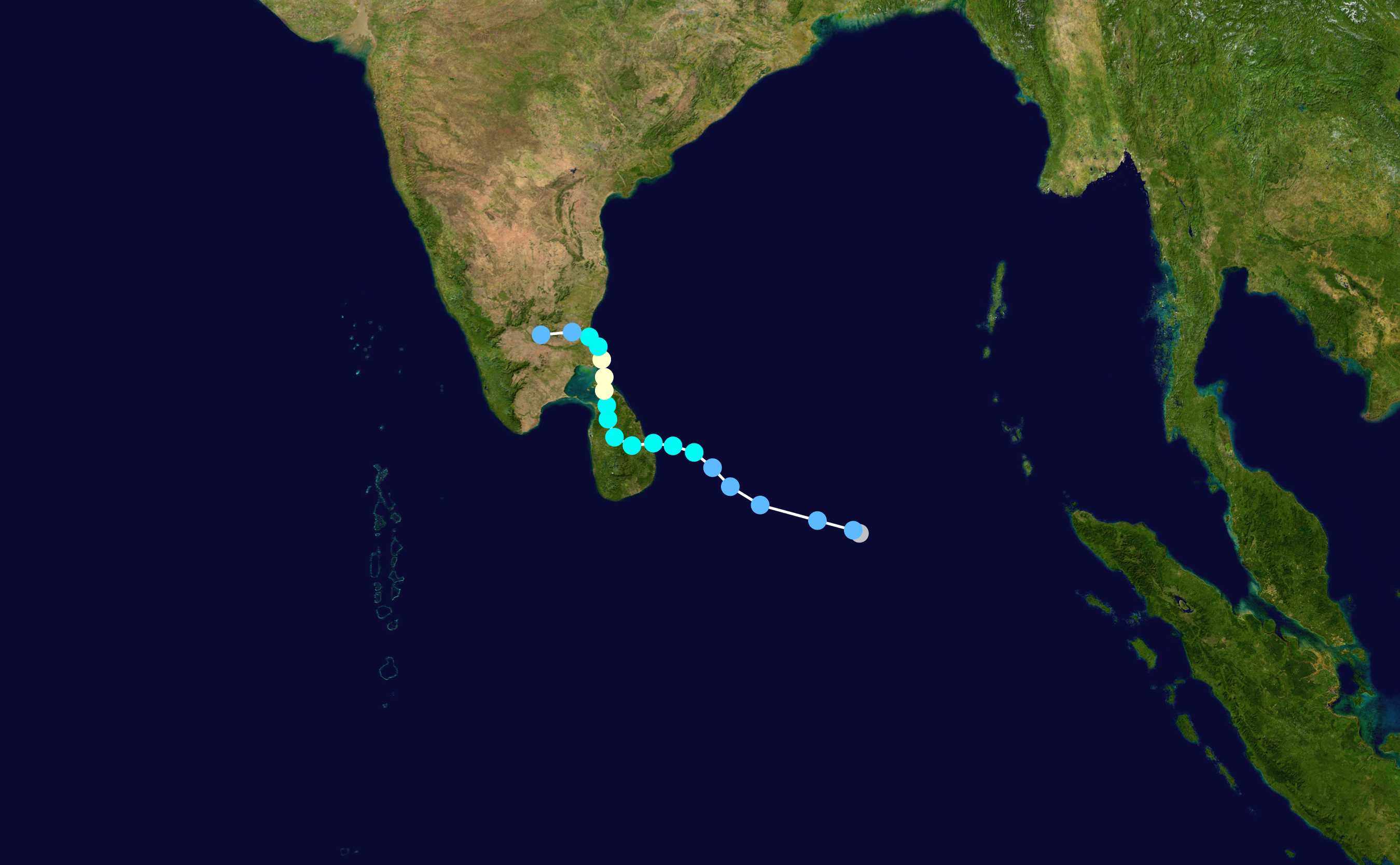
- Duration: December 3 – December 8
- Peak intensity: 120 km/h (75 mph) (1-min);

This storm moved from southeast to northwest.

== See also ==
- North Indian Ocean tropical cyclone
- List of tropical cyclone records
- 1967 Atlantic hurricane season
- 1967 Pacific hurricane season
- 1967 Pacific typhoon season
- Australian region cyclone seasons: 1966–67 1967–68
- South Pacific cyclone seasons: 1966–67 1967–68
- South-West Indian Ocean cyclone seasons: 1966–67 1967–68
