= Before (Gold Panda EP) =

EP by Gold Panda
- Released: September 2009
- Genre: Electronic
- Producer: Derwin Panda

Gold Panda chronology
Before (2009)	Lucky Shiner (2010)

Before is an EP by electronic producer Gold Panda, released by Gold Panda himself in September 2009. The track "Heaps" came to prominence when it was used as a beat by American rapper Curren$y for a video by Pitchfork Media leading to Curren$y exclaiming "Give me 16 beats from Gold Panda."

== Track listing ==
1. "Lonely Owl" – 4:18
2. "I Suppose I Should Say 'Thanks' or Some Shit" – 3:54
3. "Heaps" – 2:53
4. "Bad Day Bad Loop" – 1:25
5. "Triangle Cloud" – 3:17
6. "Win-san Western" – 3:09
