= Gael Baudino =

American fantasy author

Gael Baudino (born 1955) is a contemporary American fantasy author who also writes under the pseudonyms of Gael Kathryns, Gael A. Kathryns, K.M. Tonso, and G.A. Kathryns. She attended college at the University of Southern California. Sometime before 1994 she converted from Dianic Wicca and became a Quaker. As Gael Kathryns she contributed several instructional articles about harping to the Folk Harp Journal during the 1990s.

== Bibliography ==
=== The Dragonsword Trilogy ===
- Dragonsword (1988) ISBN 1-55802-003-9
- Duel of Dragons (1991) ISBN 0-451-45097-3
- Dragon Death (1992) ISBN 0-451-45147-3

=== The Strands Series ===
- Strands of Starlight (1989) ISBN 0-451-16371-0
- Maze of Moonlight (1993) ISBN 0-451-45230-5
- Shroud of Shadow (1993) ISBN 0-451-45294-1
- Strands of Sunlight (1994) ISBN 0-451-45408-1
- Spires of Spirit (1997) ISBN 0-451-45568-1 - A collection of six short stories set in the "Strands" universe.

=== The Water! series ===
- O Greenest Branch! (1995) ISBN 0-451-45449-9
- The Dove Looked In (1996) ISBN 0-451-45497-9
- Branch and Crown (1996) ISBN 0-451-45553-3

=== Standalone ===
- Gossamer Axe (1990) ISBN 0-451-45025-6
- The Borders of Life (1999) as G.A. Kathryns. ISBN 0-451-45574-6
- Darkling Incidence (2015) as K.M Tonso. ISBN 978-1938644245.
- Snow City (2017) as G.A. Kathryns. ISBN 978-1542858076

=== Short stories ===
- "Lady of the Forest End" - Amazons II edited by Jessica Amanda Salmonson (1982) ISBN 0-87997-736-1
- "The Shadow of the Starlight" - published in The Magazine of Fantasy and Science Fiction (April 1985), republished in 1997 in Spires of Spirit.
- "The Persistence of Memory" - published in:
  - The Magazine of Fantasy and Science Fiction (November 1985)
  - The Year's Best Fantasy 12 edited by Arthur W. Saha (1986) ISBN 0-88677-163-3
  - The Bank Street Book of Fantasy edited by Howard Zimmerman (1989) ISBN 0-671-63146-2. This is a book of short stories converted into graphic novels for early teen readers.
- "Tidings of Comfort and Joy" edited by Dennis L. McKiernan - The Magic of Christmas (1992) ISBN 0-451-45190-2
- "Before" - Lammas Night edited by Mercedes Lackey (1996) ISBN 0-671-87713-5 - this story occurs in the same setting as Baudino's novel The Borders of Life.
- "Bitterfoot" - Sisters in Fantasy 2 edited by Susan Schwartz (1996) ISBN 0-451-45503-7
- "Charity" - in Spires of Spirit.
- "Lady of Light" -in Spires of Spirit
- "A Touch of Distant Hands" - in Spires of Spirit
- "Elvenhome" - in Spires of Spirit
- "Please Come to Denver (in the Spring)" in Spires of Spirit

=== Nonfiction works ===
- The Wire Strung Primer (as Gael Kathryns) - Raging Celt Productions, Englewood, Colorado, 1991
- Interview by David V. Barrett: "Music and Magic", in Interzone Science Fiction magazine #90 (1994), page 19–22.

=== Recordings ===
- For Martha (as Gael Kathryns) - RC901 Raging Celt Productions, Englewood, Colorado, 1990 - original harp music
