= Michael Walsh (publisher) =

- Occupation: Publisher

Michael Jarrett Walsh owns and operates Old Earth Books, a small press science fiction publisher. He primarily publishes re-prints, though occasionally he issues original books from established authors. His first publication was a short story collection Rude Astronauts, by Allen Steele, published in 1993. He is active in science fiction fandom.

== Biography ==
Walsh has been active in fandom since the 1960s. He attended his first science fiction convention in 1968, and was chair of ConStellation, the 1983 Worldcon in Baltimore. He chaired the World Fantasy Convention in 1995 in Baltimore, in 2003 in Washington DC, and co-chaired in 2014 in Washington DC; also chaired Balticon 15 in 1981; Disclaves in 1985, 1989, and 1992 (co-chair); and Capclave in 2005 and 2014. He was Fan Guest of Honor at Unicon, 1983; Balticon 29 (1995); Lunacon, 1997; Context, 1999; ConQuesT 33 (2002). In 2006 he was made a Fellow of NESFA. He attends Baltimore Science Fiction Society meetings, and is a member of the Washington Science Fiction Association (WSFA).

In addition to being the chair of Disclave and Capclave, he also held these elected offices in Washington Science Fiction Association: President 1986–1988 – Vice President 1983–1984, 1985–1986 – Trustee 1997–2000.

He is a part-time publisher: he worked full time as a sales manager for Johns Hopkins University Press from 1988 until his retirement. He has worked in the book industry in some capacity for most of his life. He has developed his publishing for a niche market that traditional publishers do not serve.

In 2009, he received a World Fantasy Award for publishing a Howard Waldrop short story collection, the Special Award – Non-Professional, having been nominated twice before.-
