= Fiona Moore =

Canadian academic, writer, and critic

- Citizenship: Canada
- Education: University of Toronto, University of Oxford
- Occupations: Academic, writer
- Writing career
- Subjects: anthropology, science fiction
- Website: fiona-moore.com

Fiona Moore is a Canadian academic, writer and critic based in London (UK). She is best known for writing works of TV criticism, short fiction, stage and audio plays (being one of the original members of the Magic Bullet Productions writing team and the coauthor of the "50 Things About..." column in Celestial Toyroom), and academic texts on the anthropology of business and organisations. Her research work has been described by Professor Roger Goodman at the University of Oxford's Nissan Institute as "engaging head-on with the growing and increasingly complex literature on transnationalism and globalisation and relating it constructively to key ideas in symbolic anthropology." A graduate of the University of Toronto and the University of Oxford, she is Chair of Business Anthropology at Royal Holloway, University of London. In 2020, she was shortlisted for the BSFA Award for Shorter Fiction, and in 2023 she won the BSFA Award for Short Non-Fiction.

== Bibliography ==
=== Non-fiction books ===
- Moore, Fiona; Stevens, Alan (2013). Liberation: The Unofficial and Unauthorised Guide to Blake's 7 (second ed.). Telos Publishing. ISBN 9781845838614.
- Moore, Fiona (2005). Transnational Business Cultures: Life and Work in a Multinational Corporation. London: Routledge. ISBN 9780754642657.
- Ardener, Shirley; Moore, Fiona, eds. (2007). Professional identities: Policy and Practice in Business and Bureaucracy. New York. ISBN 9781845450540.
- Moore, Fiona; Stevens, Alan (2007). Fall Out: The Unofficial and Unauthorised Guide to 'The Prisoner'. Telos Publishing. ISBN 9781845830199.
- Moore, Fiona; Stevens, Alan (2012). By Your Command: The Unofficial and Unauthorised Guide to Battlestar Galactica (Volume 1: The Original Series and Galactica 1980). Telos Publishing. ISBN 9781845830601.
- Moore, Fiona; Stevens, Alan (2015). By Your Command: The Unofficial and Unauthorised Guide to Battlestar Galactica (Volume 2: The Reimagined Series). Telos Publishing. ISBN 9781845839222.
- Moore, Fiona (2022). Management lessons from Game of Thrones : organization theory and strategy in Westeros. Cheltenham, UK: Edward Elgar Publishing Ltd. ISBN 9781839105289.

=== Academic publications ===
- Moore, Fiona (2002). Global elites and local people : images of Germanness and cosmopolitanism in the self-presentation of German transnational business people in London (DPhil thesis). University of Oxford.

=== Novels ===
- Moore, Fiona (2018). Driving Ambition. Toronto: Bundoran Press. ISBN 9781927881439. Review: Melville, Barbara (September 2019). "Review: Driving Ambition". Interzone. TTA Press.
- Moore, Fiona (December 10, 2024). Rabbit in the Moon. Epic Publishing. ISBN 9781734648676.

=== Short fiction and poetry ===
- "Ghost," On Spec (Fall 1996)
- "Skull Duggery," with Alan Stevens, Shelf Life, edited by Jay Eales et al., Factor Fiction Press, 2008
- "Stone Roach", Asimov Magazine, (September 2011)
- "The Kindly Race", British Fantasy Society Journal, Spring 2012 (reprinted in the 2014 World Fantasy Convention anthology Unconventional Fantasy, ed. Peggy Rae Sapienza)
- "Rabbit Season", in Blood and Water, ed. Hayden Trenholm, Toronto: Bundoran Press, 2012. Aurora Award Winner (Best Related Work), 2013
- "Mouse Trap", Perihelion SF, July 2013
- "The Egg Man", in Sanity Clause is Coming, London: Fringeworks Press, 2014
- "The Confession of Whistling Dixie", Unlikely Story 11, February 2015
- "Leave Only Footprints", Story of the Month Club, March 2015 (reprinted in the 2016 volume A Bakers' Dozen of Magic, ed. Jessica Brawney)
- "Selma Eats", XIII, March 2015
- "Seal", Lazarus Risen, ed. Hayden Trenholm and Michael Rimar, Toronto: Bundoran Press 2016
- "Auto Ethnography", EPIC Perspectives, July 2016
- "The Little Car Dreams of Gasoline", On Spec 27 (4), Autumn 2016
- "The Metaphor", Interzone, Issue 236, Sept-Oct 2011, reprinted Forever Magazine October 2016
- "Morning in the Republic of America", 49th Parallels, ed. Hayden Trenholm, Toronto: Bundoran Press, 2017
- "Proteus in the City", Nevertheless, ed. Rhonda Parrish, Toronto: EDGE, 2018
- "Doomed Youth" Interzone 278, November 2018 (reprinted in The Best of British SF 2018, NewCon Press, ed. Donna Bond)
- "Every Little Star", Mad Scientist Journal, Winter 2019 (Reviewed: Burnham, Karen (2019-07-07). "Short Fiction Reviews". Locus.
- "Jolene", Interzone 284, September 2019 (shortlisted for BSFA Award for Shorter Fiction)

=== Stage and audio work ===
==== Kaldor City ====
- Hidden Persuaders (2003) (with James Cooray Smith)
- The Prisoner (2006) (with Alan Stevens)
- Metafiction (2013) (with Alan Stevens)

==== Other audio work ====
- Radio Bastard (2012) (with Alan Stevens, Steven Allen and Robert Barringer-Lock)

==== Stage plays ====
- When Travis Met Blake, with Alan Stevens, 2008. Performed at Aftermath convention, Northampton
- Metafiction (stage version), with Alan Stevens. Performed at Sci-Fi-London Film Festival, 2011
- Storm Mine (stage version), with Alan Stevens and Daniel O'Mahony. Lass O'Gowrie Productions. Performed at the Manchester Fringe Festival 2012
