= Disclave =

Science fiction convention held in the Washington, D.C. area (1950–1997)

- Status: Defunct
- Genre: Science fiction
- Locations: Washington, D.C., area
- Inaugurated: 1950
- Most recent: 1997
- Organizer: Washington Science Fiction Association

Disclave was a science fiction convention run by the Washington Science Fiction Association (WSFA) in or near Washington, D.C., in the spring of nearly every year from 1950 through 1997. By many counts, it was the third-oldest science fiction convention.

At first it was intermittent and small, with an attendance as low as 22 people (in 1953). From 1965 on, it happened every year. From 1971 on, it lasted the three days of Memorial Day weekend. For a notable section of the SF community, that weekend was considered Disclave's; even after the final session, several years passed before a similar mid-Atlantic group (Balticon) began meeting on Memorial Day.

The highest attendance was 1485 (in 1979), 85 more members than in 1981 when Isaac Asimov was the guest of honor. Some other guests of honor have been Lois McMaster Bujold, Gene Wolfe, George R. R. Martin, Connie Willis and William Gibson. Notable chairs were Jay Haldeman, Alexis A. Gilliland and Jack Chalker.

In the early 1990s, the convention attracted increasing numbers of non-members.

In 1997, a fire sprinkler was broken, flooding much of the hotel. Although an investigation determined that neither Disclave nor WSFA were responsible, "the Disclave flood" was forever associated with the convention. The 1998 Disclave, scheduled for a different hotel on a different weekend, was canceled six weeks before the convention by the hotel. The 1997 convention was the last Disclave.

After Disclave, WSFA planned the structure and focus of their next convention. The first Capclave was held in 2001.

== List of Disclaves ==
Year-Mo-Days	Site	State	Featured Guests	Chair	Attendance
1950 4 30	Wardman Park	DC	Willy Ley	Bob Briggs	75
1951 4 29	Statler	DC	Sam Moskowitz	Bob Briggs	23
1952 None					
1953 3 22	Statler	DC	"Proxyclave"	Bob Briggs	22
1954 None					
1955 None					
1956 None					
1957 None					
1958 5 10-11	Arva Motel	VA	None	Bob Pavlat	65
1959 5 16-17	Diplomat Motel	DC	None	Bob Pavlat	65
1960 5 21-22	Diplomat Motel	DC	None	George H. Scithers	
1961 5 13-14	Diplomat Motel	DC	None	George H. Scithers	40
1962 5 12-13	Diplomat Motel	DC	None	George H. Scithers	32
1963 None					
1964 None					
1965 5 8-9	Howard Johnson's Wheaton	MD	Chris and Sam Moskowitz	Banks Mebane	83
1966 5 13-15	Diplomat Motel	DC	Roger Zelazny	Jay Haldeman	99
1967 5 12-14	Regency Congress	DC	Jack Gaughan	Jay Haldeman	
1968 5 10-12	Regency Congress	DC	Robert Silverberg	Jay Haldeman	
1969 5 09-11	Skyline Inn	DC	Lester del Rey	Jay Haldeman	
1970 5 15-17	Skyline Inn	DC	Murray Leinster	Jay Haldeman	
1971 5 28-31	Shoreham Hotel	DC	Terry Carr	Jay Haldeman	
1972 5 26-29	Sheraton Park	DC	Ben Bova	Jay Haldeman	
1973 5 25-28	Sheraton Park	DC	Gardner Dozois	Jay Haldeman	
1974 5 24-27	Sheraton Park	DC	Kelly Freas	Alexis Gilliland	284
1975 5 23-26	Sheraton Park	DC	Gordon Dickson	Alexis Gilliland	360
1976 5 28-31	Sheraton Park	DC	William Tenn	Alexis Gilliland	675
1977 5 27-30	Sheraton Park	DC	Joe Haldeman	Alexis Gilliland	850
1978 5 26-29	Sheraton Park	DC	Bob (Wilson) Tucker	Alexis Gilliland	1005
1979 5 25-28	Sheraton Park	DC	Roger Zelazny/Michael Whelan	Alan Huff	1485
1980 5 23-26	Hospitality House	VA	Jeanne and Spider Robinson	Tom Schaad	
1981 5 22-25	Sheraton National	VA	Isaac Asimov	Alexis Gilliland	1400
1982 5 28-31	Sheraton National	VA	Elizabeth Lynn/Tom Miller	Jack Chalker/Eva Whitley	
1983 5 27-30	Marriott TwinBr	VA	George R. R. Martin/Jack Gaughan	Alan Huff	1100
1984 5 25-28	New Carrollton	MD	Connie Willis/Paul Yurek	Jane Wagner	900
1985 5 24-27	New Carrollton	MD	Ed Bryant/Bob Walters	Michael J. Walsh	
1986 5 23-26	New Carrollton	MD	William Gibson/Steve Stiles	Jack Heneghan	
1987 5 22-25	New Carrollton	MD	Gene Wolfe/Barclay Shaw	Joe Mayhew	1350
1988 5 27-30	New Carrollton	MD	Barbara Hambly/Jim Burns	Tom Schaad	1350
1989 5 26-29	New Carrollton	MD	Lucius Shepard/J.K.Potter	Michael J. Walsh	
1990 5 25-28	New Carrollton	MD	Mike Resnick/Dawn Wilson/Somtow Sucharitkul/Marty Gear	Eva Whitley	1300
1991 5 24-27	New Carrollton	MD	Lewis Shiner/Alicia Austin	Peggy Rae Pavlat	1200
1992 5 22-25	Washington Hilton	DC	Pat Cadigan/Thomas Kidd	Michael J. Walsh/Covert Beach	
1993 5 28-31	Dulles Marriott	VA	Katherine Kurtz/Patricia Davis	Covert Beach	835
1994 5 27-30	Sheraton Tysons Corner	VA	Lois M. Bujold/Steven Johnson/Darlene P. Coltrane	John Peacock/Paula Lewis	
1995 5 26-29	Techworld	DC	Charles Sheffield/Bob Eggleton/David Bischoff	Dan Hoey	
1996 5 24-27	Capitol Hill Hyatt	DC	Michael Swanwick/Hannah Shapero	Bob MacIntosh	623
1997 5 23-26	New Carrollton	MD	Patricia Anthony/Lissanne Lake/Peggy Rae Pavlat	Michael Nelson	850
1998 None			Terry Bisson/Gene Wolfe/Nicholas Jainschigg	Joe Mayhew	0
1999 None				Sam Pierce	0
2000 None				Covert Beach	0
