= Evo Terra =

American writer

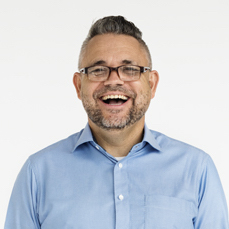
- Terra, 2016
- Born: Travis Unwin; June 10, 1968 (age 58); Lawton, Oklahoma, U.S.
- Other name: Pod Yoda
- Occupations: Podcaster; writer
- Spouse: Sheila Dee
- Website: evoterra.com

Travis Unwin (born June 10, 1968), known professionally as Evo Terra, is an American podcaster, author, radio broadcaster, and businessman based in Bangkok, Thailand. Terra is the author of Podcasting For Dummies, originator of The Beer Diet, a travel blogger, and an early pioneer in podcasting.

== Career ==
=== Podcasting ===
Evo Terra began his audio content career as a member of the team that produced and presented an internet-based radio show in 2002. The format focused on interviews of notable authors, including interviews with Arthur C. Clarke, Boris Vallejo, and Piers Anthony. The show moved to terrestrial radio and then to satellite syndication in 2003. As one of the earliest popularizers of podcasting, Terra's first podcast episode appeared on the Podcast Alley directory on October 14, 2004, and was only the fortieth podcast produced as of that date. Slice of SciFi received the Top Rated Podcast Award in 2005 and the 2008 Parsec Award for Best Speculative Fiction News Podcast. In 2006, Terra was one of the co-founders of Podiobooks.com, a website that uses podcasting technology to help authors distribute serialized versions of audiobooks from various genres. In 2011, Terra founded ePublish Unum, a company that provided educational services for independent authors until September 2014. Terra has also been a panelist in the podcasting track at Dragon Con in Atlanta, Georgia. and delivered the keynote address at the Podcast Movement conference in Dallas, Texas in 2014.

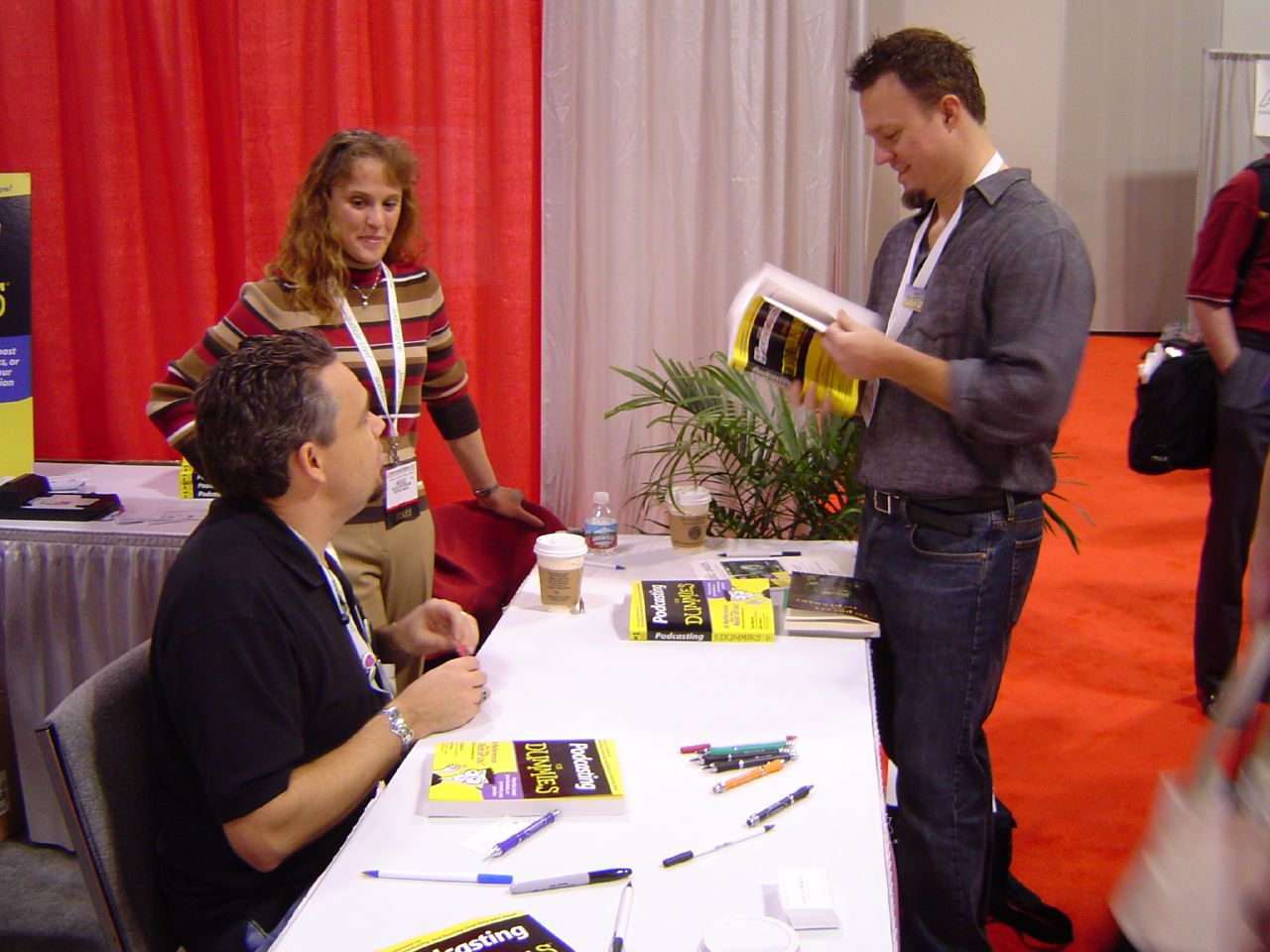
Evo Terra book signing for Mark Jeffrey

=== Publishing ===
In 2005, the first edition of Podcasting For Dummies, co-authored with Tee Morris, was published by John Wiley & Sons. Terra collaborated on the second edition of Podcasting For Dummies with Tee Morris, Chuck Tomasi, and Kreg Steppe in 2008. These were two of the earliest easily accessible books on the new medium known as podcasting, and helped popularize the new medium among content creators. The 2007 publication of Expert Podcasting Practices For Dummies expanded on the techniques described in the first book. The Beer Diet (A Brew Story), published in 2013, chronicled Terra's experience consuming only beer and sausages for one month. Terra also self-published two other books, Google Plus For Authors (2013), and Writing Awesome Book Blurbs (2013).

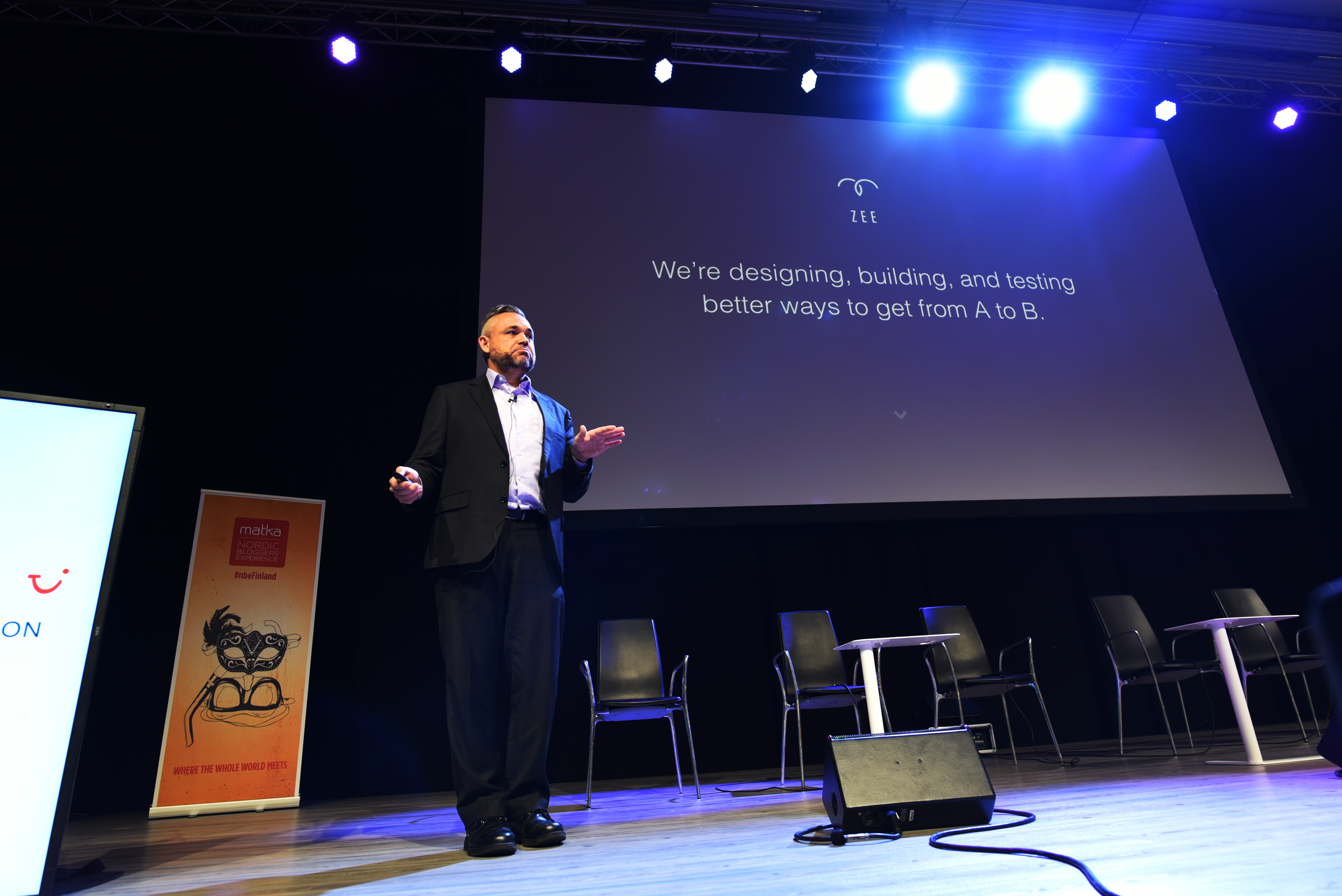
Evo Terra at NBE-Matka

=== Travel blogging ===
In January 2015, Terra and his wife, Sheila Dee, sold everything in order to travel the world. The couple began a blog and a podcast called The Opportunistic Travelers, as well as a second travel podcast called This One Time. The blog is known for its exploration of novel methods of financing travel, including long-term housesitting in their desired travel destinations. Terra delivered the opening keynote address at both the TBEX Asia Pacific travel writers' convention in the Philippines in October 2016 and the MATKA Nordic Travel Fair in January 2017.

=== Other endeavors ===
Evo Terra has spoken on the subjects of entrepreneurship, digital marketing, and technological innovation at events such as the 2011 South by Southwest conference and Ignite Phoenix. In 2015, Terra was a keynote speaker on the subject of digital strategy at the UnGagged conference in London, England. Terra also regularly appears at fandom conventions in various capacities, such as panel discussions on the podcasting track at Dragon Con and even a musical performance with George Hrab's Triologic at Balticon in 2011. He writes a weekly newsletter for fans of complete audio fiction called 'The End'.

== Bibliography ==
- Evo Terra and Tee Morris, (2005), Podcasting For Dummies, For Dummies ISBN 978-0471748984
- Evo Terra and Tee Morris, (2007), Expert Podcasting Practices for Dummies, For Dummies ISBN 978-0470149263
- Evo Terra, Chuck Tomasi, and Tee Morris, (2008), Podcasting For Dummies, 2nd Edition, For Dummies ISBN 978-0470275573
- Evo Terra, (2004) The Fantasy Writer's Companion (Chapter credit: "Herbalism in Fantasy"), Dragon Moon Press ISBN 1-896944-15-9

== See also ==
- Scott Sigler
- Mark Jeffrey
