= Unicon =

Unicon may refer to:

- Unicon (unicycling), the bi-annual unicycling world championships
- Unicon (programming language), a programming language descended from Icon
- Unicon (Maryland science fiction convention), a series of science fiction conventions held in Maryland 1974 through 1989
