= Christine Taylor-Butler =

American children's author

- Born: Ohio
- Education: Massachusetts Institute of Technology
- Website: christinetaylorbutler.com

Christine Taylor-Butler (born in the 1960s) is a children's book author in the United States. She has written more than 80 books including The Lost Tribe series. She has been an advocate for diversity in character representations and led by example.

Taylor-Butler majored in civil engineering and architecture at the Massachusetts Institute of Technology, graduating in 1981. She has written nonfiction for Scholastic, including for their True Book educational series. She lives in Kansas City with her husband. She has two adult daughters.

She wrote an essay about gender inequity at the Caldecott Awards and discussed the Coretta Scott King Book Awards.

== Biography ==
Christine Taylor-Butler grew up in Cleveland, Ohio in the 1960s. She attended boarding school at Phillips Exeter Academy in New England before going to MIT where she graduated in 1981 with a degree in civil engineering, with architecture. She also completed a second MIT degree in Art & Design.

After college, Taylor-Butler took on a number of jobs, including at a start-up software company and at Harvard University, before working as a graphic arts manager at Hallmark Cards for more than a decade.

Recognizing a gap in the market in children's books, she worked with the Scholastic True Books educational nonfiction series, Taylor-Butler wrote more than 30 books about topics across science and social science, from the human body and planets to the United States Supreme Court and civil rights.

Married with daughters, Taylor-Butler noticed the lack of diverse characters in young adult and children's books, and took that on as her next challenge. She has published over 80 books. She was formerly an interviewer for MIT admissions. She was awarded the George B. Morgan Award from MIT in recognition of her sustained excellence in all aspects of Educational Council activity. Taylor-Butler is a member of the Science Fiction and Fantasy Writers of America, and has been a judge for PEN and toastmaster at the World Fantasy Convention.

She lives in Kansas City.

== Works ==
- The Lost Tribe series
- Lamb's Easter Surprise (2012)
- Reading Maps (2012)
