= Baltimore Science Fiction Society =

Literary organization in Baltimore, Maryland, USA

- Abbreviation: BSFS
- Established: January 5, 1963; 63 years ago
- Type: Literary society, 501(c)(3)
- Headquarters: 3310 East Baltimore Street; Baltimore, Maryland 21224
- Location(s): PO Box 686 Baltimore, Maryland 21203
- Origins: Washington Science Fiction Association (WSFA)
- Region served: Baltimore metropolitan area
- Products: Balticon
- Services: Young Writers Contest, Books for Kids, lending library
- Field: Science fiction
- Publication: BSFAN
- Awards: Compton Crook Award; Robert A. Heinlein Award
- Website: bsfs.org

The Baltimore Science Fiction Society (BSFS) is a literary organization focusing on science fiction, fantasy and related genres. A 501(c)3 literary society based in Baltimore, Maryland, the BSFS sponsors Balticon, the Maryland Regional Science Fiction Convention.

== Activities ==
BSFS sponsors a young writers contest for Maryland students named the "Jack L. Chalker Young Writers Contest." BSFS conducts the annual Bobby Gear Memorial Charity Auction to fund the BSFS Books for Kids program which gives free reading books to students in cooperation with a Maryland school/schools.

The BSFS has presented the Compton Crook Award each year since 1983. The award is given to the year's best debut novel in the SFF genre. Compton Crook, who wrote under the pseudonym Stephen Tall, was a science fiction author, long-time Baltimore resident, and professor at Towson University.

Since 2013, the BSFS has administered the Robert A. Heinlein Award.

== History ==
The Baltimore Science Fiction Society was first formed on January 5, 1963, on the back seat of a Trailways bus, by people returning from a meeting of the Washington Science Fiction Association (WSFA). Four years later, the group held its first Balticon. This convention was planned in part as a promotion for Baltimore's Worldcon bid. The club went into suspension in 1968 and was re-organized in 1974.

=== Tax exemption lawsuit ===
In 2001, the BSFS applied for a property tax exemption on the basis that its building was used for educational purposes. The State Department of Assessments and Taxation (SDAT) denied the exemption. BSFS appealed to the Tax Court, which reversed SDAT's decision. SDAT appealed to the circuit court, which ruled that promoting science fiction was not an educational purpose. Finally, BSFS appealed to the Court of Special Appeals, which reversed the circuit court decision and granted the exemption.

Throughout this process, SDAT argued that BSFS was a social or hobby club, not educational. The Tax Court rejected SDAT's narrow definition of "educational purposes", finding that there is "a certain affinity between 'educational' and literary functions and activities."
