= WSFA Journal =

The WSFA Journal is a science-fiction fanzine that was published approximately once a month from 1965 to 2012 by the Washington Science Fiction Association (WSFA).

The journal typically contains reviews of books, movies, science fiction fanzines, science fiction conventions, TV shows, and websites; obituaries; minutes of WSFA meetings; humor; original fantasy and science fiction; cartoons; spoofs; news about WSFA, science, science fiction, and science fiction fandom; announcements of upcoming events; letters and emails to WSFA; and much more. The only things specifically forbidden are current American politics, sports scores, and attacks on WSFA members.

It is usually only distributed at WSFA meetings. However, it is available on the Web. Thirty years of issues are available online.

There was a gap in publication from 1975 to 1978. The 85 issues from before this gap, called first series issues, were more widely distributed within fandom, and today often show up on eBay. First series issues started at 6 to 10 pages, but by the 1970s had grown to between 48 (January 1971) and 159 (May 1971) pages. All first series issues were edited by Don Miller, who also, from 1969 to 1975 edited the Son of the WSFA Journal. (After 1975, Don Miller changed the name of his publications from WSFA Journal and Son of the WSFA Journal to SF&F Journal and SF&F Newsletter, respectively, while continuing his numbering system. Under these new names, the publications lasted through at least 1978, and possibly 1981.)

Issues from after the 1975–1978 gap, called second series issues started at 4 pages, but soon varied from 1 page (April 1988) to 30 pages (July 1993). It was later edited by Samuel Lubell. Past editors of the second series are Somtow Sucharitkul (1978–1979), Joe Mayhew (1979–1996, intermittently), Marianne Petrino-Schaad (1980–1981), Jane Wagner (1981–1983), Beverly Brandt (1983–1985), Ginny McNitt (1985–1986), Erica Ginter (1986–1987), Mary Morman (1988–1989), Rachel Russell (1989–1990), Lee Strong (1990–1995), Samuel Lubell (1996–2004), Keith Lynch (2004–2005), Ernest Lilley (2005–2006), Drew Bittner (2006–2007), Adrienne Ertman (2007), and Steven Smith (2007–2010). Since 1980, the editor has usually but not always been WSFA's secretary.

== Reviews ==
- The Strategic Review #4
