= Unicon (Maryland science fiction convention) =

Science fiction convention in Maryland, US

- Status: Defunct
- Genre: Science fiction
- Location: Maryland
- Country: United States
- Inaugurated: 1975
- Most recent: 1989

Unicon was an annual science fiction convention held in Maryland and at least once in Washington, D.C. from 1975 through 1989.

Unicon was born in the early 1970s on the second floor of the Stamp Student Union building at the University of Maryland, College Park. Unicon stood for University Convention. The University of Maryland Science Fiction Club was the organizing body. The club originally began as an open university course on science fiction with Stephen Rynas, a university junior, as the instructor.

Unicon I was held at the Interstate Inn on Route 1 in College Park. The Guest of Honor was Frederik Pohl.

Unicon outgrew any facilities in College Park and moved to the Silver Spring Sheraton (now a Hilton, where four Capclaves were held) for a successful run into the 1980s.

== List of Unicons ==
Number	Year-Mo-Days	Site	Featured Guests	Chair(s)
1	1975	College Park Interstate Inn	Frederik Pohl	Natalie Paymer
2B	1976	University of Maryland Student Union	L. Sprague de Camp, Ted White	Natalie Paymer
3	1977 7 8-10	Silver Spring Sheraton	Clifford D. Simak	Natalie Paymer
4	1978 7 7-9	Silver Spring Sheraton	Theodore Sturgeon	Theodore L. Manekin, Randy Brunk Natalie Paymer
5	1979 7 20-22	Shoreham Americana, Washington, D.C.	Robert Bloch, Ron Cobb, Dan O'Bannon	Natalie Paymer, Theodore L. Manekin, Sue Ruth
6	1980 7 18-20	Silver Spring Sheraton	James P. Hogan	Clinton Winchester, Theodore L. Manekin
	1981	none		
82	1982 7 16-18	Silver Spring Sheraton	Hal Clement, Robert A. Madle, Karl Kofoed	Clinton Winchester, Jim Williams
8	1983 7 15-17	Silver Spring Sheraton	Joan D. Vinge, Michael J. Walsh, Teanna Lee Byerts, Jim Frenkel	Clinton Winchester
84	1984 7 20-22	Silver Spring Sheraton	Gene Wolfe, Dawn Wilson, Peggy Rae Pavlat	Clinton Winchester
10	1985 7 19-21	Silver Spring Sheraton	Michael Shea, Val Lakey Lindahn, Arthur W. Saha	Paul Parsons
UniContinuity Party	1986 7 26	Church of the Ascension, Silver Spring		
87	1987 7 17-19	Annapolis Holiday Inn	David Brin, David Mattingly, Marty Gear	Clinton Winchester
12	1988 7 22-24	Annapolis Holiday Inn	Vernor Vinge, Ned Dameron	Clinton Winchester
13	1989 7 14-16	College Park Holiday Inn	Tim Powers, Debbie Hughes, Mark Maxwell	Paul Parsons
