= Ungagged =

Marketing conference

- Type: Private
- Industry: Marketing conferences
- Founded: 2013
- Founders: Damien Trevatt, Greg Hayman
- Headquarters: London, United Kingdom
- Area served: Las Vegas, London
- Website: www.ungagged.com

UnGagged is a search engine optimization and digital marketing conference. The purpose of the semi-annual event is to provide a platform for speakers to present uncensored content to audiences behind closed doors without recordings. UnGagged is an international event, but to date all of the presentations, media and related content has been produced in the English language.

== History ==
The inaugural conference was held at Caesars Palace in Las Vegas in November 2014 and had approximately 300 attendees, 30 speakers and 16 sponsors. The second event was held in London in May 2015 and had approximately 200 attendees. The third event was held in Las Vegas in November 2015 and had approximately 300 attendees.

The latest UnGagged event was planned to be held in London, starting on July 11, 2022, and lasting a total of three days (till July 13th, 2022). However, it got postponed to 2023.

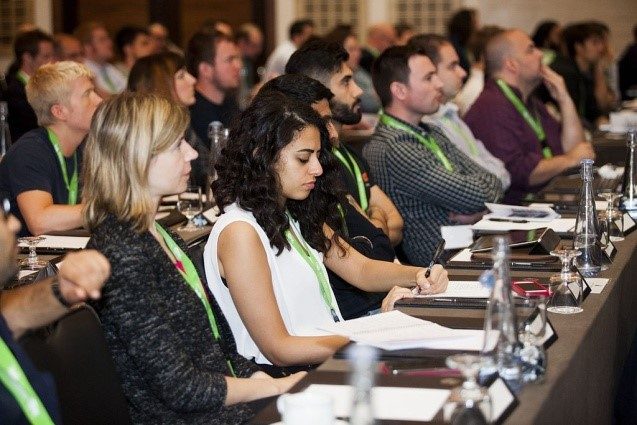
Ungagged London conference in May 2015

== Overview ==
The conference tackles the subjects of web strategy, social media, search engine optimization, affiliate marketing, content marketing, mobile marketing, behavioral targeting, and graphic design. Past attendees of the conference include Bing, CBS Interactive, LinkedIn, Oracle, Yahoo, Shopify, and others.

=== The recording ban ===
The UnGagged events forbid any video or audio recording to encourage their speakers to speak freely and have an unbiased discussion.

It is forbidden for speakers to have any hidden agendas, sales pitches or self-promotional content.

== Events ==
The UnGagged events are held each year in London and Las Vegas. More locations are planned to be introduced in the future.

Name	Location	Opening	Closure	Keynote speakers
Las Vegas 2014	Las Vegas, USA	November 15, 2014	November 17, 2014	Scott Stratten, Erika Napoletano
London 2015	London, UK	May 16, 2015	May 18, 2015	Marcus Tandler, Joe Sinkwitz, Evo Terra
Las Vegas 2015	Las Vegas, USA	November 9, 2015	November 11, 2015	Duane Forrester, Rae Hoffman
London 2016	London, UK	June 23, 2016	June 24, 2016	Bas van den Beld, Marcus Tandler
Las Vegas 2016	Las Vegas, USA	November 13, 2016	November 14, 2016	Duane Forrester, Marty Weintraub, William Sears
London 2017	London, UK	June 15, 2017	June 16, 2017	Marty Weintraub
London 2018	London, UK	June 11, 2018	June 12, 2018	Marty Weintraub
Las Vegas 2018	Las Vegas, USA	November 4, 2018	November 7, 2018	Bartosz Góralewicz, Jono Alderson, Jenna Tiffany
