= Peggy Rae Sapienza =

American science fiction convention organizer (1944–2015)

- Born: Peggy Rae McKnight; 28 June 1944; Philadelphia, Pennsylvania, United States
- Died: 22 March 2015 (aged 70); Virginia, United States
- Education: University of Maryland
- Spouse: John Sapienza (1999 - 2015) Bob Pavlat (1964–1983)
- Children: Two

Peggy Rae Sapienza (born McKnight, previously Pavlat, 28 June 1944 – 22 March 2015), was a science fiction fan, con-runner, and promoter of science fiction fandom. She made memorable contributions to Noreascon III in Boston, the 1989 Worldcon, partnering with Fred Isaacs in conceptualizing the ConCourse, a new feature for Worldcons. A Vice Chair of the 1993 Worldcon, ConFrancisco, she served briefly as Acting Chair after the Chairman died, until a new chairman was appointed. In 1998 she chaired BucConeer, the 56th Worldcon in Baltimore. She served as North American agent for the first Worldcon to be held in Japan, Nippon 2007; in 2010 co-chaired, and 2011 and 2012 chaired the SFWA Nebula Awards Weekends; and was Fan Guest of Honor at Chicon 7, the 70th Worldcon, held in 2012. She co-chaired the 2014 World Fantasy Convention just months before she died due to complications from heart surgery.

== Early life and family ==
Peggy Rae was born on June 28, 1944, outside of Philadelphia, to Jack and Buddie McKnight, both members of the Philadelphia Science Fiction Society (PSFS). Her stepmother, Ann Newell McKnight, was also a member of PSFS, and her stepfather, Bill Evans, was active in the Washington Science Fiction Association (WSFA).

When she was 9 years old she watched as her father, Jack McKnight, spent most of the 1953 Worldcon in his metal shop machining the first Hugo Award rockets, which he had been recruited to do at the last minute, making it to the Convention just in time for the Hugo Ceremony. (Jack remained bitter about missing most of the Con until his death.) A few years later, at the age of 12, she attended her first science fiction convention, Philcon, with her parents, and at the age of 16, she attended Pittcon, her first World Science Fiction Convention (Worldcon), where she met her future husband, Robert K. (Bob) Pavlat.

From the mid-1960s on, Peggy Rae was an active member of WSFA, attended conventions across the country, and often found herself on the con committee. She was active in the PSFS in the late 1950s, where she served as Secretary and Vice President, and she was active in fanzine fandom in the 1960s and beyond.

== Marriage, children, and fandom ==
She married fan Bob Pavlat, who was nearly 20 years her senior, in 1964, and they settled into the Washington DC suburbs and had two children, Melissa (Missy) and Eric. Starting in the 1960s she published several fanzines, including 7 issues of "etwas" from 1960 - 1963, Of Cabbages and Kings (and Baby Turtles) 1969–1996, Of Members and Zines (and Egoboo Polls) c 1968 +, and the fapazine Adventures on Earth, 1999–2004.

Science fiction was not her only interest; she was also active in local politics, serving as a legislative assistant to Frank Pesci, Maryland State Delegate from Prince George's County, working with the League of Women Voters of Prince George's County, serving as district leader for the 1976 presidential campaign of Mo Udall, and once running for a seat on the County Council. In the 1980s, Maryland Governor Harry Hughes appointed her to the Maryland State Board of Elections, where in January 1995, she cast the tie-breaking vote validating the gubernatorial election of Parris Glendening over Ellen Sauerbrey. Glendening had won by 5993 votes, but Sauerbrey had contested both in court and to the Board.

She also served as the president of the Parent-Teacher Association for her children's school for several years in the 1970s, served on the Prince George's County Community Mental Health Advisory Board, volunteered at the Paint Branch Unitarian Universalist Church for twenty years, and volunteered completing taxes for the elderly later in life.

In 1963 she served on the Con Committee for the first Worldcon held in Washington DC, Discon I, and she did it again for Discon II in 1974. She continued to serve on Worldcon Con Committees regularly for the next four decades, all over the United States and beyond, including Constellation, in 1983, in Baltimore, Maryland. At Constellation, she was in charge of Programming and Special Events. In that position, she revived the one-off idea from a previous WorldCon of running an entire schedule of children's programming. Children's programming has since become a staple of WorldCons.

Her husband, Bob, died suddenly only months before Constellation. With help from her staff and committee she was able to pull through. She and Bob were jointly awarded the Big Heart Award there, one of fandom's highest honors, but she was now widowed at the age of 38, with 2 children to raise. The following year she went to work as a contractor for the United States government in Washington, D.C., as a UNIX Administrator for OSHA.

== Running conventions ==
At Noreascon III in Boston in 1989, she and Fred Isaacs ran the “Second Floor Division", which included Exhibits, Registration, the Dealers’ Room, Information, Press Relations and the Newsletter. She also conceptualized and managed the ConCourse for which Noreascon III was known.

She chaired Disclave, the DC Regional SF convention, in 1991: the 9th SMOFCon, held in New Orleans in 1992: and SMOFCon 22, held in Washington DC in 2004.

She served as vice-chairman for ConFrancisco, the 1993 Worldcon in San Francisco, stepping in to serve as interim chair when the Chairman died suddenly.

Sapienza helped organize the first FanHistoricon, which took place May 1994, in Hagerstown, MD. Her goal was to create some kind of umbrella organization to oversee existing fan history activities, and to come up with ideas for new ones. FanHistoricon wasn't a convention, it was more of a workshop to establish a structure for the new organization, which became The Society for the Preservation of the History of Science Fiction Fandom, aka the Timebinders.

Her many accomplishments in fandom were crowned by her election as Chair of Bucconeer, the 1998 Worldcon in Baltimore, by the Baltimore in 1998 Worldcon Bid Committee. She was instrumental in forming the Baltimore Washington Area Worldcon Association (BWAWA) in the wake of BucConeer. For several years after, BWAWA continued administration of the Young Writers' contest which had been started for BucConeer. As a 501(c)(3) BWAWA was able to sponsor other fannish pursuits such as organizing SFWA's Awards Weekends in 2010 and 2011, and the World Fantasy Convention in 2014. As an Officer of BWAWA, she was a key factor in the formation of DC17, a bid to bring the Worldcon back to Washington DC in 2017, which was launched in October 2013. DC17 lost the site selection vote held at Sasquan in August 2015.

She married her second husband John Sapienza, a long-time RPG aficionado who had contributed to TSR's Advanced Dungeons & Dragons and Chaosium's RuneQuest, in 1999. Their honeymoon was in Australia, where not unexpectedly, Sapienza was recruited on short notice to coordinate volunteers at AussieCon III.

More recently she was on the Bid Committee and represented Nippon, first for their Bid and then as a member of their Con Comm and North American Agent, which bid for and won the right to hold the 65th World Science Fiction Convention in 2007. She not only became reasonably conversant in Japanese but also helped plan the program for the English-speaking portion of the convention. The Japanese language became a lifelong interest; upon her death in 2015, a Japanese-language instructional CD was found inserted in her car's CD player.

== Mowing Peggy Rae's lawn ==
Sometime in the nineties, when a fan arrived at Sapienza's house early for a con–planning meeting and found her gardening, he pitched in to help, and one by one the other committee members did so too, as they arrived. Joe Mayhew warned people that if Baltimore won the 1998 Worldcon, all the committee members would wind up mowing Peggy Rae's lawn. Thus was born the phrase “I mowed Peggy Rae's Lawn,” which indicated that people were sucked in when Peggy Rae looked at them and said, with a big smile on her face, “You know, I think you would be good at…”

In 2012, at Chicon 7, she was honored as the Fan Guest of Honor. Her display in the Exhibits area consisted of a patch of astroturf surrounded by picket fences and park benches. Sitting in the middle of the patch was a small toy lawnmower, to give everyone at the con the chance to mow Peggy Rae's lawn.

== Legacy ==
She and John endowed a scholarship at the University of Maryland, her alma mater, for a student majoring in economics "to help facilitate the education of a hardworking student and encourage him or her toward graduation" (Sapienza had graduated summa cum laude with a B.A. in economics).

On June 5, 2015, Chicon 7 created the Peggy Rae Sapienza Endowment to benefit the special collections library at Northern Illinois University, using the last of Chicon 7's surplus funds. Chicon 7 Chair Dave McCarty announced the initial endowment of $25,000 during the Nebula Awards Weekend reception at The Palmer House Hilton in Chicago. The endowment is intended to advance the library's efforts to collect materials related to SF, fantasy, and horror, and to make those materials available to the public.

In a tribute to her on his blog, Whatever, John Scalzi wrote: "...I considered Peggy Rae a friend, and deeply admired her competence and her cheerfulness in being so. If Peggy Rae was running things, basically, I felt in safe hands. She’ll be remembered ...by all of science fiction fandom."

== Awards ==
In January 2017 Peggy Rae Sapienza was announced as the recipient of the SFWA's Kate Wilhelm Solstice Award with the following citation: "The Science Fiction and Fantasy Writers of America (SFWA) is pleased to announce that Peggy Rae Sapienza has been named the recipient of the Kate Wilhelm Solstice Award to honor her activities in support of science fiction and fantasy.The Kate Wilhelm Solstice Award is given by SFWA for distinguished contributions to the science fiction and fantasy community."
