= Heinlein Society =

Society to study and promote SF writer Robert Heinlein

The Heinlein Society
- Formation: 2000
- Members: 1150 (2023)
- Website: heinleinsociety.org

The Heinlein Society is a United States organization devoted to the study and promotion of the American science fiction author Robert Heinlein.

The Heinlein Society was founded in 2000 with the assistance of Robert Heinlein's widow, Virginia Heinlein, after a suggestion by William Patterson at WesterCon in 1998 met with an enthusiastic response. The Heinlein Society is a 501(c)(3) non-profit corporation established in Texas. The "semi-scholarly" society exists to "preserve the legacy of renowned writer Robert Anson Heinlein left"; according to it, it accomplishes this through promoting "Heinlein blood drives", distributing copies of Heinlein's works to U.S. military personnel, awarding scholarships, and promoting scholarly research on Heinlein. The society also sponsors the Robert A. Heinlein Award.

In 2016 the organization paid for a bronze bust of Heinlein for display in the Missouri State Capitol, following the author's induction into the Hall of Famous Missourians.
