= Balticon =

Maryland Regional science fiction convention

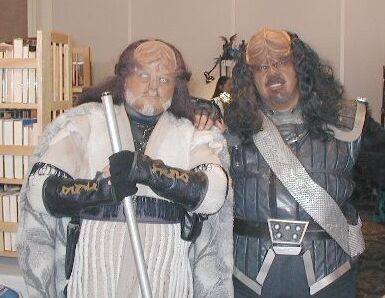
- Klingons in 2008
- Status: Active
- Genre: Science fiction
- Location: Maryland
- Country: United States
- Inaugurated: 1966
- Organizer: Baltimore Science Fiction Society
- Website: http://www.balticon.org/

Balticon is the Maryland Regional science fiction convention, sponsored by the Baltimore Science Fiction Society (BSFS). It has been held annually since 1966. The name "Balticon" is trademarked by BSFS.

== Overview ==
Balticon brings together over 1800 science, science fiction and fantasy professionals, creative amateurs, and fans on Memorial Day weekend each year for a 4-day multi-track event in or around Baltimore.

Balticon can be described as a "General" or "Big Tent" science fiction convention since, while the primary emphasis is literary, programming and activities cover a number of other areas, such as anime, art, costuming, science, Podcasting and new media, gaming, and Filk music.

Balticon is produced by the Baltimore Science Fiction Society, Inc., a 501(c)(3) literary society. It is run entirely by volunteers, who assume responsibility at many levels, ranging from gofers who sign up and run errands at the convention, to the Con Chair who may spend up to two years on planning and administration.

Activities and program items are developed by the convention staff with suggestions from program participants, and the literary program usually concentrates most heavily on the segment of genre in which the year's Guest of Honor publishes most of his/her work. Some Balticon activities and tracks run 24 hours a day from Friday afternoon to Monday afternoon.

== Awards ==
BSFS presents the Compton Crook Award given for the best first novel in the Science Fiction, Fantasy or Horror genre, during Balticon. The previous year's winner is invited back to present the award to the new winner.

The winner of the annual Jack L. Chalker Young Writer's Contest is announced at Balticon. BSFS sponsors this short story writing contest for Maryland residents or school attendees between the ages of 14 and 18, in the Fantasy or Science Fiction genres.

Beginning in 2013, the Baltimore Science Fiction Society began presenting the Robert A. Heinlein Award at Balticon Opening Ceremonies. BSFS is the sponsoring organization for the award, which was started in 2003 by Yoji Kondo, and is 50% funded by The Heinlein Society. The recipient is selected by a panel of judges originally chosen from among Robert Heinlein's fellow SF writers.

The Balticon Poetry Contest winners are invited to read their winning entries at Balticon, and they are published in the Balticon Convention Program Guide. Cash prizes and convention memberships are awarded.

The Masquerade is usually held on Saturday night, and awards are given for various categories in Costuming, including creativity, construction and presentation.

The Balticon Sunday Night Short Film Festival (BSNSFF) is a no-submission-fee competition traditionally held on Sunday night for short films in the Science Fact, Science Fiction, Fantasy, and Horror genres. Currently, the audience votes to choose winners in animated and live-action categories.

Past Balticon Sunday Night Short Film Festival winners:

- 2006 THE GRANDFATHER PARADOX
- 2007 HIDE AND SEEK – Chris Romano, Creator/Director
- 2008 THE END IS NIGHT
- 2009 Best Animated BURNING SAFARI
- 2009 Best Live Action The Hunt for Gollum
- 2010 Best Animated ETA – Henrik Bjerregaard Clausen, director
- 2010 Best Live Action (tie) ANDROID LOVE – Lee Citron, writer/director
- 2010 Best Live Action (tie) THE LEGACY – Mike Doto, writer/director
- 2010 Best Specialty Short THIS TOO SHALL PASS (OK Go)
- 2010 Director's Choice Animated THE PAINTER OF SKIES – Jorge Morais Valle, writer/director
- 2010 Director's Choice Live Action MY FRIEND JOSH – Shaun Springer, director
- 2011 Best Animated ZERO – Christopher Kezelos, director
- 2011 Best Live Action DEAD ON TIME – Kostos Skiftas, Andreas Lambropoulos, directors
- 2011 Director's Choice Animated SINTEL – Colin Levy, writer/director
- 2011 Director's Choice Live Action CORBIN – Brent Weichsel, director

Balticon may also premier an independent feature-length film, and a locally (MD, DC, VA, PA) produced feature film some time during the 4-day convention, as well as several hours of panel discussions in Balticon's Filmmaking Program track.

== History ==
Prior to 1966, BSFS held an annual event for the election of BSFS board of directors. After several years, BSFS rented hotel space and invited an author to speak, as a guest of honor, at its election events. From this point forward, the event became an annual convention known as Balticon. Subsequently, BSFS election functions were moved to a different date.

Before 2001, Balticon was held on Easter weekend to take advantage of lower hotel costs and was three days long; however, in 2001 Balticon moved to Memorial Day Weekend and expanded to a full four days.

=== Past conventions ===
Event - Number -	Date	Location	Guests (listed GoH)
Balticon 1	10–12 February 1967	The Emerson Hotel, Baltimore MD	no guest of honor
Balticon 2	9–11 February 1968.	Lord Baltimore Hotel, Baltimore, MD	Samuel R. Delany
Balticon 3	14–15 February 1969	Lord Baltimore Hotel, Baltimore, MD	L. Sprague de Camp
Balticon 4	13–15 February 1970 (Washington Birthday Weekend)	Lord Baltimore Hotel, Baltimore, MD	Damon Knight & Kate Wilhelm
Balticon 5	12–14 February 1971 Washington's Birthday Weekend	Lord Baltimore Hotel, Baltimore, MD	Harry Harrison
Balticon 6	18–20 February 1972	Hopkins Hilton Hotel, Baltimore, MD	Gordon R. Dickson
Balticon 7	Washington's Birthday Weekend, 16–18 February 1973	Lord Baltimore Hotel, Baltimore, MD	Poul Anderson
Balticon 8	15–18 February 1974 - Washington's Birthday Weekend	Lord Baltimore Hotel, Baltimore, MD	Frederik Pohl
Balticon 9	Easter Weekend, 28–30 March 1975 (First Year On Easter)	Pikesville Hilton Hotel, Pikesville, MD	Hal Clement
Balticon 10	16–18 April 1976	Hunt Valley Inn, Hunt Valley, MD	Isaac Asimov
Balticon 11	8–10 April 1977	Hunt Valley Inn, Hunt Valley, MD	Philip José Farmer
Balticon 12	24–26 March 1978	Hunt Valley Inn, Hunt Valley, MD	Anne McCaffrey
Balticon 13	13–15 April 1979	Hunt Valley Inn, Hunt Valley, MD	Poul Anderson
Balticon 14	4–6 April 1980	Hunt Valley Inn, Hunt Valley, MD	Algis Budrys & Sean Spacher
Balticon 15	Easter Weekend 17–19 April 1981	Hunt Valley Inn, Hunt Valley, MD	John Varley
Balticon 16	9–11 April 1982	Hyatt Regency Hotel, Baltimore, MD	Samuel R. Delany
Balticon 17	1–3 April 1983	Hyatt Regency Hotel, Baltimore, MD	L. Sprague de Camp & Catherine Crook de Camp
Balticon 18	20–22 April 1984	Hyatt Regency Hotel, Baltimore, MD	Parke Godwin
Balticon 19	Easter Weekend 7–9 April 1985	Hunt Valley Inn, Hunt Valley, MD	R. A. MacAvoy
Balticon 20	28–30 March 1986	Hyatt Regency Hotel, Baltimore, MD	Nancy Springer
Balticon 21	17–19 April 1987	Omni Inner Harbor Hotel, Baltimore, MD	Roger Zelazny
Balticon 22	1–3 April 1988	Hunt Valley Inn, Hunt Valley, MD	Spider Robinson
Balticon 23	24–26 March 1989	Omni Inner Harbor Hotel, Baltimore, MD	C. J. Cherryh
Balticon 24	13–15 April 1990	Hunt Valley Inn, Hunt Valley, MD	Robin McKinley
Balticon 25	29–31 March 1991	Hunt Valley Inn, Hunt Valley, MD	Nancy Kress
Balticon 26	17–19 April 1992	Hunt Valley Inn, Hunt Valley, MD	Donald Kingsbury, Christopher Rowley, David R. Palmer, Sheila Finch, Thomas T. Thomas (Wren), Christopher Hinz, Elizabeth Moon, Josepha Sherman and Michael F. Flynn
Balticon 27	9–11 April 1993	Hunt Valley Inn, Hunt Valley, MD	Allen Steele
Balticon 28	1–3 April 1994	Hyatt Regency Hotel, Baltimore, MD	Mercedes Lackey
Balticon 29	14–16 April 1995	Lord Baltimore & Omni Inner Harbor Hotel, Baltimore, MD	James P. Hogan
Balticon 30	5–7 April 1996	Omni Inner Harbor Hotel, Baltimore, MD	Robert Jordan
Balticon 31	28–30 March 1997	Omni Inner Harbor Hotel, Baltimore, MD	Glen Cook
Balticon 32	10–12 April 1998	Omni Inner Harbor Hotel, Baltimore, MD	Harry Turtledove
Balticon 33	2–4 April 1999	Omni Inner Harbor Hotel, Baltimore, MD	David Weber
Balticon 34	22–23 April 2000	Omni Inner Harbor Hotel, Baltimore, MD	Octavia Butler
Balticon 35	25–28 May 2001	Wyndham Inner Harbor Hotel, Baltimore, MD	Hal Clement
Balticon 36	24–27 May 2002	Wyndham Inner Harbor Hotel, Baltimore, MD	Mark Rogers, Phil Foglio & Kaja Foglio
Balticon 37	23–26 May 2003	Wyndham Inner Harbor Hotel, Baltimore, MD	Steve Miller & Sharon Lee
Balticon 38	28–31 May 2004	Wyndham Inner Harbor Hotel, Baltimore, MD	Lois McMaster Bujold
Balticon 39	27–30 May 2005	Wyndham Inner Harbor Hotel, Baltimore, MD	Steven Barnes & Tananarive Due
Balticon 40	26–29 May 2006	Hunt Valley Inn, Hunt Valley, MD	Neil Gaiman
Balticon 41	25–28 May 2007	Hunt Valley Inn, Hunt Valley, MD	Larry Niven, Jerry Pournelle, Joe Bergeron, Jeff & Maya Bohnhoff, Michael R. Mennenga & Evo Terra
Balticon 42	23–26 May 2008	Hunt Valley Inn, Hunt Valley, MD	Connie Willis, John Jude Palencar & Urban Tapestry
Balticon 43	22–25 May 2009	Hunt Valley Inn, Hunt Valley, MD	Charles Stross, Kurt Miller, Mary Crowell
Balticon 44	28–31 May 2010	Hunt Valley Inn, Hunt Valley, MD	Tanya Huff, Howard Tayler, Thomas R. Holtz, Jr.
Balticon 45	27–30 May 2011	Hunt Valley Inn, Hunt Valley, MD	Dr Ben Bova, Vincent DiFate, Philippa Ballantine, Bill and Brenda Sutton
Balticon 46	25–28 May 2012	Hunt Valley Inn, Hunt Valley, MD	Jody Lynn Nye, James Robin Odbert, Heather Dale and Ben Deschamps
Balticon 47	24–27 May 2013	Hunt Valley Inn, Hunt Valley, MD	Joe Haldeman, Rick Sternbach, Ada Palmer
Balticon 48	23–26 May 2014	Hunt Valley Inn, Hunt Valley, MD	Brandon Sanderson, Halo Jankowski, Kenneth Anders, Marty Gear
Balticon 49	22–25 May 2015	Hunt Valley Inn, Hunt Valley, MD	Jo Walton, Ruth Sanderson, Erica Neely, Charles E. Gannon, CJ Henderson, Alexandra Duncan, Jack McDevitt
Balticon 50	26–30 May 2016	Renaissance Baltimore Harborplace Hotel, Baltimore, MD	Guest of Honor George R. R. Martin, Artist Guest of Honor John Picacio, Music Guests of Honor Bill Roper and Gretchen Roper, Fan Guests of Honor Martin Deutsch and B. Shirley Avery
Balticon 51	26–29 May 2017	Renaissance Baltimore Harborplace Hotel, Baltimore, MD	Guest of Honor Eric Flint (unable to attend due to health issues), Artist Guest of Honor Donato Giancola, Fan Guest of Honor Geri Sullivan, Filk Guest of Honor Amy McNally, Special Guest Stephen Brust, Special Guest SM Stirling.
Balticon 52	25–28 May 2018	Renaissance Baltimore Harborplace Hotel, Baltimore, MD	Guest of Honor Catherine Asaro, Artist Guest of Honor Galen Dara, Fan Guest of Honor Erwin Strauss (aka Filthy Pierre), Filk Guest of Honor Tim Griffin.
Balticon 53	24–27 May 2019	Renaissance Baltimore Harborplace Hotel, Baltimore, MD	Guests of Honor Elizabeth Bear and Scott Lynch, Artist Guest of Honor Charles Vess
Balticon 54	22–25 May 2020	Online,	Guest of Honor Wen Spencer, Artist Guest of Honor Lee Moyer, Music Guests of Honor Cheshire Moon
Balticon 55	28–31 May 2021	Online,	Guest of Honor Seanan McGuire, Artist Guest of Honor Alyssa Winans, Music Guests of Honor Margaret & Kristoph
Balticon 56	27–30 May 2022	Renaissance Baltimore Harborplace Hotel, Baltimore, MD	Guest of Honor Nancy Springer, Music Guests of Honor Jen Midkiff, Fan Guests of Honor Bruce & Cheryl Évry
Balticon 57	26–29 May 2023	Renaissance Baltimore Harborplace Hotel, Baltimore, MD	Guest of Honor Jane Yolen (unable to attend due to health issues, represented by Special Guest Adam Stemple), Music Guest of Honor Technical Difficulties 2.0, Artist Guest of Honor Ariel Burgess, Fan Guest of Honor Bryan "Bellz" Jordan
Balticon 58	24–27 May 2024	Renaissance Baltimore Harborplace Hotel, Baltimore, MD	Guest of Honor L.E. Modesitt, Jr., Editor Guest of Honor Sheila Williams, Artist Guest of Honor Omar Rayyan, Music Guest of Honor Rhiannon's Lark

=== Virtual convention ===
Balticon 54 had been scheduled as an in person for 22–25 May 2020, but the in-person convention was cancelled due to the COVID-19 pandemic. The event was reorganized to be a free online convention on the same dates. It took place over Zoom, Discord, and Second Life. Balticon 55, May 28 - 31, 2021, was also held as a virtual event. Admission to the virtual conventions was free in both years. A hybrid event was planned for Balticon 56. This was the first time a charge was required to attend virtual programming. Balticon 57 was in-person, with many events streamed and later available for viewing by those who had purchased tickets or virtual passes.
