= Washington Science Fiction Association =

American literary club

The Washington Science Fiction Association (WSFA) is the oldest science fiction club in the Washington, D.C. area. It is also one of the oldest science fiction clubs, founded in 1947 by seven fans who met at that year's Worldcon in Philadelphia, the fifth Worldcon held.

Since 1960 it has met on the evenings of the first and third Fridays of each month in the homes of members. All meetings are open (and along the way have included a Polish student, a Cuban author, and a Chilean physician writer). There are often informal meetings on fifth Fridays. Because there was a 5th Friday in February 1980—a 5th Friday in February occurs only every 28 years—it was decided to hold a relaxacon called DatClave. The second DatClave was held in 2008.

On January 5, 1963, club members from Baltimore were trapped on a Trailways bus when returning to Baltimore after a WSFA meeting. The Baltimore Science Fiction Society was formed on the backseat of the bus.

It hosted the annual Disclave science fiction convention in or near Washington, D.C., from 1950 through 1997. After a four-year hiatus WSFA began a new convention, Capclave. WSFA has also hosted Worldcons, SMOFcons, World Fantasy Conventions, and many other events both casual and otherwise.

Since 1965 WSFA has published the monthly WSFA Journal. WSFA Press has published the books: The Father of Stones by Lucius Shepard in 1989, Through Darkest Resnick With Gun and Camera by Mike Resnick in 1990, The Edges of Things by Lewis Shiner in 1991, Home By The Sea by Pat Cadigan in 1992, and Future Washington, an anthology edited by Ernest Lilley, in 2005, Reincarnations by Harry Turtledove in 2009. In 2010 WSFA Press published two books in conjunction with Capclave, The Three Quests of the Wizard Sarnod, by Jeff VanderMeer, and Fire Watch by Connie Willis. In 2013 WSFA Press published George R. R. Martin's award-winning novella The Skin Trade as a stand-alone 1st Edition hardcover in conjunction with Martin being Capclave's Guest of Honor that year.

Not issued as a WSFA Press book, but published by WSFA, was a promotional giveaway to the membership of the 2005 Capclave, and issued without an isbn, was a chapbook by Guest of Honor Howard Waldrop. The chapbook was published in the format of an Ace Double cover art by Carol Emshwiller, wife of the late artist Ed Emshwiller who did many covers for the Ace science fiction books (signing his art as Emsh). The two stories were "The Horse of a Different Color (That You Rode in On)" and "The King of Where-I-Go". "The King of Where-I-Go" was a finalist for the Hugo Award and the Locus Award.

In 2007, the WSFA inaugurated the WSFA Small Press Award.

WSFA is incorporated as a 501(c)(4) non-profit organization.

== Disclave ==
Disclave was a science fiction convention run by WSFA in or near Washington, D.C., in the springtime of nearly every year from 1950 through 1997. By most counts it was the fourth-oldest science fiction convention. The Washington Post had an article about that first Disclave, which began: "The Washington Science Fiction Association held its first disclave at the Hotel Wardman Park yesterday, with visitors from as far away as Pennsylvania and New York, and rocket expert, Willy Ley, among the speakers."

In 1997, after the final Disclave, WSFA took time off to discuss and plan the structure and focus of their next convention. The first Capclave was held in 2001.

== Capclave ==
Capclave
- Genre: Science fiction
- Location: Washington, D.C.
- Country: United States
- Organizer: Washington Science Fiction Association
- Website: http://www.capclave.org

Capclave is a science fiction convention that has been run by the Washington Science Fiction Association (WSFA) near Washington, D.C., in the autumn of every year starting in 2001.

== Table of Capclaves ==
| Year-Mo-Days | Site | State | Featured Guests | Chair | Paid Attendance | Total Attendance |
|---|---|---|---|---|---|---|
| 2001 9 28-30 | Sheraton College Park | MD | Gardner Dozois | Bob MacIntosh | unknown | 296 |
| 2002 10 18-20 | Hilton Silver Spring | MD | Stanley Schmidt/Alexis Gilliland | Michael Nelson | unknown | 285 |
| 2003 11 21-23 | Hilton Silver Spring | MD | William Tenn | Sam Lubell | unknown | 234 |
| 2004 10 15-17 | Tysons Marriott | VA | Nick Pollotta/Butch Honeck/Dennis McCunney | Lee Gilliland | 129 | 250 |
| 2005 10 14-16 | Hilton Silver Spring | MD | Howard Waldrop/Patrick Nielsen Hayden//Teresa Nielsen Hayden | Michael J. Walsh | 329 | 385 |
| 2006 10 20-22 | Hilton Silver Spring | MD | Kim Stanley Robinson/Tom Whitmore | Elspeth Kovar | 288 | 378 |
| 2007 10 12-14 | Rockville Hilton | MD | Jeffrey Ford/Ellen Datlow | Colleen Cahill | 257 | 323 |
| 2008 10 17-19 | Rockville Hilton | MD | James Morrow/Michael Dirda | Sam Scheiner | 246 | 319 |
| 2009 10 16-18 | Rockville Hilton | MD | Harry Turtledove/Sheila Williams | Bill Lawhorn | 304 | 387 |
| 2010 10 22-24 | Rockville Hilton | MD | Connie Willis/Ann VanderMeer/Jeff VanderMeer | Gayle Surrette | 330 | 420 |
| 2011 10 14-16 | Gaithersburg Hilton | MD | Carrie Vaughn/Catherynne M. Valente | Cathy Green | 324 | 402 |
| 2012 10 12-14 | Gaithersburg Hilton | MD | John Scalzi/Nick Mamatas | George Shaner | 333 | 404 |
| 2013 10 11-13 | Gaithersburg Hilton | MD | George R. R. Martin/Sharyn November/Steve Stiles/Howard Waldrop | Michael J. Walsh | 808 | 920 |
| 2014 10 10-12 | Gaithersburg Hilton | MD | Paolo Bacigalupi/Holly Black/Genevieve Valentine | Bill Lawhorn | 384 | 453 |
| 2015 10 9-11 | Gaithersburg Hilton | MD | Alastair Reynolds/Gordon Van Gelder | Sam Lubell | 368 | 440 |
| 2016 10 7-9 | Gaithersburg Hilton | MD | Sarah Beth Durst/Tim Powers | Paul Haggerty | 319 | 419 |
| 2017 10 6-8 | Gaithersburg Hilton | MD | Neil Clarke/Ken Liu | Cathy Green | 291 | 349 |
| 2018 9 28-30 | Rockville Hilton | MD | Nancy Kress/Alyssa Wong | Cathy Green | 289 | 357 |
| 2019 10 18-20 | Rockville Hilton | MD | Robert J. Sawyer/Martha Wells | Bill Lawhorn | 338 | 406 |
| 2020 10 17-18 | Virtual | | Troy L. Wiggins | Bill Lawhorn | 347 | 438 |
| 2021 10 1-3 | Rockville Hilton | MD | Peter Beagle/Eric Flint | George Shaner | 306 | 278 |
| 2022 9 30-10 2 | Rockville Hilton | MD | Irene Gallo/Ursula Vernon | Rodger Burns | 234 | 251 |
| 2023 9 29-10 1 | Rockville Hilton | MD | Charlie Jane Anders/Sarah Pinsker | Aaron Pound | 244 | 282 |
| 2024 9 27-29 | Rockville Hilton | MD | Matt Dinniman/Sheree Renee Thomas | Bill Lawhorn | 330 | 396 |
| 2025 9 19-21 | Rockville Hilton | MD | Joe Haldeman/Gay Haldeman/Naomi Kritzer | Sam Lubell | | |
