= Robert A. Heinlein Award =

American literary award

- This medallion, designed by Arlin Robins, is given to award winners.
- Awarded for: Outstanding science fiction or technical writing promoting space exploration.
- Sponsored by: Baltimore Science Fiction Society
- Country: United States
- First award: 2003; 23 years ago
- Website: bsfs.org/bsfsheinlein.htm

The Robert A. Heinlein Award was established by the Heinlein Society in 2003 "for outstanding published works in science fiction and technical writings to inspire the human exploration of space". It is named for renowned science fiction author Robert A. Heinlein and is administered by the Baltimore Science Fiction Society. It is generally given annually to one or more recipients.

The Robert A. Heinlein Award is a sterling silver medallion bearing the image of Robert A. Heinlein, as depicted by artist Arlin Robbins. The medallion is matched with a red-white-blue lanyard.

== Winners ==
Award winners
Year	Winner(s)	Ref.
2003	Michael Flynn; Virginia Heinlein	
2004	Arthur C. Clarke	
2005	Larry Niven; Jerry Pournelle	
2006	Greg Bear; Jack Williamson	
2007	Anne McCaffrey; Elizabeth Moon	
2008	Ben Bova; Spider Robinson	
2009	Joe Haldeman; John Varley	
2010	not awarded	
2011	Connie Willis	
2012	Stanley Schmidt	
2013	Allen Steele; Yoji Kondo	
2014	Geoffrey A. Landis	
2015	Jack McDevitt	
2016	Kim Stanley Robinson	
2017	Robert J. Sawyer	
2018	Neal Stephenson	
2019	Gregory Benford	
2020	Vernor Vinge	
2021	C. J. Cherryh	
2022	David Gerrold	
2023	John Scalzi	
2024	Tom Doherty	
2025	Sharon Lee	
2026	Andy Weir	
