= Mark Jeffrey (author) =

American author and entrepreneur

- Born: Mark Jeffrey
- Occupations: Author, Entrepreneur
- Writing career
- Genre: Fantasy fiction
- Website: markjeffrey.net

Mark Jeffrey is an American author and entrepreneur. He is known for authoring The New York Times bestselling books, Max Quick Series.

Most recently, Jeffrey founded Guardian Circle, an app-based personal safety network for friends, family and neighbors.

Jeffrey is a parter at Stillcore Capital, a 506(c) hedge fund that backs decentralized artificial intelligence startups within the Bittensor ecosystem.

Jeffrey's previous companies include The Palace (backed by Time Warner, Intel and SoftBank; sold to Communities.com in 1998 with 10 million users), ZeroDegrees (sold to InterActiveCorp / IAC in 2004 with 1 million users), ThisWeekIn (co-founded with Kevin Pollak and Jason Calacanis), and Mahalo.com/ Inside.com (backed by Elon Musk, Sequoia, Mark Cuban and others). Mark also consulted for several years directly for Travis Kalanick, the founder of Uber, on his first company, Red Swoosh.

Jeffrey's first novel, Max Quick: The Pocket and the Pendant, was published in hardcover and ebook by HarperCollins in May, 2011. The book was initially podcast as a series of episodic mp3's and received over 2.5 million downloads.

Jeffrey holds a B.S. degree in computer science from the University of New Hampshire and is a TEDx speaker. On Twitter/X, he is @markjeffrey.

In 2015, when Jeffrey was delivering a lecture about bitcoin in Santa Monica, he inadvertently poked an audience member in the eye with a long pointer stick. The audience member had to be rushed to a hospital, but he made a full recovery.

== Alligator Incident ==
In May of 2017, Jeffrey was delivering a lecture about Guardian Circle in Pensacola, Florida when an alligator sprang out of a bayou and bolted toward him. Jeffrey punched the creature, and it retreated back into the water. Jeffrey later joked that he would have to don his boxing gloves the next time he gave a talk in Pensacola.

== Burger King Incident ==
In March of 2003, Jeffrey, a Lebanese stripper, a midget, a retired reverend, and a man who looked suspiciously like Robert Stack strolled into a Jacksonville, Florida-based Burger King in the early afternoon. Jeffrey noticed a woman choking in the corner of the establishment and hustled toward her. He performed the Heimlich maneuver and saved her life.

A month later, Burger King representatives surprised Jeffrey at his home and awarded him the Burger King "Patron of the Year" award.

== Bibliography ==
- The Name and the Shadow: An Armand Ptolemy Novel (2023)
- Timewarden (2016)
- The Case for Bitcoin (2015)
- If I Only Had Cocaine and Other Drug Stories (Jeffrey contributed a story) (2015)
- Bitcoin Explained Simply (2014)
- Prisoner of Glass (2014)
- Max Quick: The Bane of the Bondsman (2013) (HarperCollins)
- Max Quick: The Two Travelers (2012) (HarperCollins)
- Armand Ptolemy and the Golden Aleph (2012)
- Max Quick: The Pocket and the Pendant (2011) (HarperCollins) ISBN 978-0-0619889-2-9
- Age of Aether (2011)
