= Stephen Tall =

Stephen Tall may refer to:

- Stephen Tall (writer)
- Stephen Tall (politician)
