= World Fantasy Convention =

Fan convention

- Status: Active
- Genre: Fantasy, science fiction
- Frequency: Annually
- Country: United States
- Years active: 51
- Inaugurated: October 31, 1975
- Website: www.worldfantasy.org

The World Fantasy Convention is an annual convention of professionals, collectors, and others interested in the field of fantasy. The World Fantasy Awards are presented at the event. Other features include an art show, a dealer's room, and an autograph reception.

The convention was conceived and begun by T. E. D. Klein, Kirby McCauley and several others.

== Previous conventions ==
Dates	Location	Info
October 31– November 2, 1975	Holiday Inn; Providence, Rhode Island, US	Theme for 1975 is "The Lovecraft Circle". Guest of Honor: Robert Bloch. Toastmaster: Gahan Wilson. Chaired by Kirby McCauley. Judges were Ramsey Campbell, Edward L. Ferman, David G. Hartwell, Fritz Leiber, and Gahan Wilson.
October 29–31, 1976	The Statler Hotel; New York, New York, US	Theme for 1976 is "Unknown Worlds". Guests of Honor: C. L. Moore and Michael Moorcock. Toastmaster: Gahan Wilson. Chaired by Thom Anderson. Judges were Charles Collins, Basil Copper, Gordon R. Dickson, Stuart David Schiff, and Gahan Wilson.
October 28–30, 1977	Los Angeles Biltmore; Los Angeles, California, US	Theme for 1977 is "Clark Ashton Smith". Guest of Honor: Richard Matheson. Toastmaster: Gahan Wilson. Chaired by Dennis Rickard. Judges were Robert Bloch, David Drake, Harlan Ellison, Charles L. Grant, and Robert Weinberg.
October 13–15, 1978	Sheraton Fort Worth Hotel; Fort Worth, Texas, US	Theme for 1978 is "Robert E. Howard". Guest of Honor: Fritz Leiber. Guest Artist: Alicia Austin. Toastmaster: Andrew Offutt. Chaired by Michael Templin. Judges were Charles N. Brown, Carl Jacobi, Stephen King, T. E. D. Klein, and Karl Edward Wagner.
October 12–14, 1979	Providence Biltmore; Providence, Rhode Island, US	Theme for 1979 is "Reunion". Guests of Honor: Stephen King and Frank Belknap Long. Guest Artist: Michael Whelan. Toastmaster: Charles L. Grant. Chaired by Bob Booth. Judges were Poul Anderson, Terry Carr, Dennis Etchison, Elizabeth A. Lynn, and Roy A. Squires.
October 31– November 2, 1980	Marriott Hunt Valley Inn; Baltimore, Maryland, US	Theme for 1980 is "Edgar Allan Poe". Guest of Honor: Jack Vance. Guest Artist: Boris Vallejo. Toastmaster: Robert Bloch. Chaired by Chuck Miller and Tim Underwood. Judges were Stephen R. Donaldson, Frank Belknap Long, Andrew J. Offutt, Ted White, and Susan Wood.
October 30– November 1, 1981	The Claremont Hotel; Berkeley, California, US	Theme for 1981 is "Mark Twain, Jack London, Ambrose Bierce, Clark Ashton Smith". Guests of Honor: Alan Garner and Peter S. Beagle. Guest Artist: Brian Froud. Toastmaster: Karl Edward Wagner. Chaired by Jack Rems and Jeff Frane. Judges were Paul C. Allen, C. J. Cherryh, Gardner Dozois, Donald M. Grant, and Arthur W. Saha. (Alan Garner was unable to attend the convention.)
October 29–31, 1982	Park Plaza Hotel; New Haven, Connecticut, US	Theme for 1982 is "Mark Twain". Guests of Honor: Peter Straub and Joseph Payne Brennan. Guest Artist: Don Maitz. Toastmaster: Charles L. Grant. Chaired by Norman Hood and Harold Kinney. Judges were Pat Cadigan, Virginia Kidd, Theodore Sturgeon, Douglas E. Winter, and Chelsea Quinn Yarbro.
October 28–30, 1983	Chicago Marriott O'Hare; Chicago, US	Theme for 1983 is "Sixty Years of Weird Tales". Guests of Honor: Gene Wolfe and Manly Wade Wellman. Guest Artist: Rowena Morrill. Toastmaster: Robert Bloch. Chaired by Robert Weinberg. Judges were Bob Booth, John Coyne, Sharon Jarvis, Alan Ryan, and Elizabeth Wollheim.
October 12–14, 1984	Westin Hotel; Ottawa, Ontario, Canada	Theme for 1984 is "Fantasy, An International Genre". Guests of Honor: Tanith Lee and Jane Yolen. Guest Artist: Jeff Jones. Toastmaster: Spider Robinson. Chaired by Rodger Turner and John Bell. Judges were Ellen Asher, Ginjer Buchanan, Les Daniels, Mimi Panitch, and George H. Scithers.
October 31– November 3, 1985	Doubletree Hotel; Tucson, Arizona, US	Theme for 1985 is "Fantasy Writers of the Southwest". Guest of Honor: Stephen R. Donaldson. Special Guest: Evangeline Walton. Guest Artist: Victoria Poyser. Toastperson: Chelsea Quinn Yarbro. Chaired by Randal Rau. Judges were Suzy McKee Charnas, Jo Fletcher, George R. R. Martin, Baird Searles, and Terri Windling.
October 29– November 2, 1986	Providence Biltmore; Providence, Rhode Island, US	Theme for 1986 is "From 'New Writers' to 'Old Masters'". Guests of Honor: Ramsey Campbell and Charles L. Grant. Guest Artist: J. K. Potter. Toastmaster: Douglas E. Winter. Chaired by Robert Plante. Judges were Robert A. Collins, Ellen Datlow, Dean R. Koontz, Patricia A. McKillip, and Charles de Lint.
October 29– November 1, 1987	Hyatt Regency Nashville; Nashville, Tennessee, US	Theme for 1987 is "A Southern Fantasy". Guest of Honor: Piers Anthony. Guest Artist: Frank Kelly Freas. Special Guests: Andre Norton, Karl Edward Wagner, plus Ron and Val Lakey Lindahn. Toastmaster: Charles L. Grant. Chaired by Maurine Dorris. Judges were John M. Ford, Paul Hazel, Tappan King, Michael McDowell, and Melissa Ann Singer.
October 28–31, 1988	Ramada Inn; London, England, UK	Theme for 1988 is "Gaslight & Ghosts". Combined with Fantasycon XIII. Guest of Honor: James Herbert. Artist Guest: Michael Foreman. Special Guest: Diana Wynne Jones. MC: Clive Barker. Chaired by Jo Fletcher and Stephen Jones. Judges were Mike Ashley, Scott Baker, Robert S. Hadji, Maxim Jakubowski, and Donald A. Wollheim
October 27–29, 1989	Seattle Sheraton; Seattle, Washington, US	Theme for 1989 is "Roots of Fantasy: Myth, Folklore & Archetype". Honored Guests: Ursula K. Le Guin, Avram Davidson, S. P. Somtow, Robert R. McCammon, and Yoshitaka Amano. Toastmaster: Ginjer Buchanan. Chaired by Robert J. Doyle.
November 2–4, 1990	Hyatt Regency Hotel; Schaumburg, Illinois, US	Theme for 1990 is "An H. P. Lovecraft Centenary Celebration". Guests of Honor: F. Paul Wilson, L. Sprague de Camp, and Susan Allison. Guest Artist: David B. Mattingly. Special Guests: Robert Bloch and Julius Schwartz. Toastmaster: Raymond E. Feist. Chaired by Robert Weinberg.
November 1–3, 1991	The Doubletree Hotel; Tucson, Arizona, US	Theme for 1991 is "The Fantasy Heritage of the Spanish and Indian Cultures". Special Guests: Susan and Harlan Ellison. Artist Guest: Arlin Robins. Toastmaster: Stephen R. Donaldson. Chaired by Bruce Farr and Randal Rau.
October 29– November 1, 1992	Callaway Gardens Resort; Pine Mountain, Georgia, US	Theme for 1992 is "Grails: Quests, Visitations, and Other Occurrences". Guests of Honor: Michael Bishop, John Farris, Martin H. Greenberg, Anne McCaffrey, and Robert Gould. Chaired by Richard Gilliam and Edward E. Kramer.
October 28–31, 1993	Radisson South Hotel; Bloomington, Minnesota, US	Theme for 1993 is "The Vocabulary of the Fantastic". Guests of Honor: Poul Anderson, John Crowley, and Roger Zelazny. Guest Artist: Thomas Canty (did not attend). Special Guest: Basil Copper. Toastmaster: Neil Gaiman. Chaired by Greg Ketter.
October 27–31, 1994	Clarion Hotel; New Orleans, US	Theme for 1994 is "Obsessions in Fantasy and Gothic Horror". Honored Guests: Damon Knight, George Alec Effinger, George R. R. Martin, Tim Powers, and Kate Wilhelm. Artist Guest of Honor: Jill Bauman. Chaired by Tom Hanlon.
October 26–29, 1995	Inner Harbor Marriott; Baltimore, Maryland, US	Theme for 1995 is "Celebrating the Craft of Short Fiction in Fantasy and Horror". Writer Guests of Honor: Terry Bisson, Lucius Shepard, Howard Waldrop. Artist Guest of Honor: Rick Berry. Publisher Guest of Honor: Lloyd Arthur Eshbach. Toastmaster: Edward W. Bryant, Jr. Chaired by Michael J. Walsh.
October 31– November 3, 1996	Woodfield Hyatt Regency Hotel; Schaumburg, Illinois, US	Theme for 1996 is "The Many Faces of Fantasy". Guests of Honor: Katherine Kurtz, Joe R. Lansdale, and Ellen Asher. Artist Guest of Honor: Ron Walotsky. Toastmaster: Brian Lumley. Chaired by Nancy Ford, Tina L. Jens, and Phyllis Weinberg.
October 30– November 2, 1997	The International Hotel; London, England, UK	Theme for 1997 is "The Centenary of Dracula/The Hidden Realms of London". Combined with FantasyCon XXI. Guests of Honour: Iain Sinclair and Joan Aitkin. Artist Guest of Honour: Bob Eggleton. Special Guests: Hugh Cave and Ron Chetwynd Hayes. Special Media Guest: Doug Bradley. Master of Ceremonies: Robert Holdstock. Chaired by Jo Fletcher.
October 29– November 1, 1998	Doubletree & Marriott Hotels; Monterey, California, US	Theme for 1998 is "Golden Ages". Guest of Honor: Gahan Wilson. Special Guests: Cecelia Holland, Richard Laymon, and Frank M. Robinson. Toastmaster: Richard A. Lupoff. Chaired by Bryan Barrett and Linda McAllister. Website archive.
November 4–7, 1999	Rhode Island Convention Center; Westin and Biltmore Hotels; Providence, Rhode Island, US	The 25th World Fantasy Convention. Guests of Honor: Charles de Lint, Leo & Diane Dillon, Patricia A. McKillip, and Robert Silverberg. Special Guest: Samuel R. Delany. Toastmaster: John M. Ford. Theme for 1999 is "Voyages". Chaired by Chip Hitchcock & Davey Snyder. Official website.
October 26–29, 2000	Omni Bayfront Hotel; Corpus Christi, Texas, US	Theme for 2000 is "El Dia de los Muertos (The Day of the Dead)". Guests of Honor: K.W. Jeter and John Crowley. Artist Guest of Honor: Charles Vess. Toastmaster: Joe R. Lansdale. Chaired by Fred Duarte. Judges were Suzi Baker, W. Paul Ganley, Tim Holman, Marvin Kaye, and Melissa Scott. Official website.
November 1–4, 2001	Delta Centre-Ville Hotel; Montreal, Quebec, Canada	Theme for 2001 is "Je me souviens"/"I remember". Guests of Honor: Fred Saberhagen, Joel Champetier, and Donato Giancola. Toastmaster: Charles de Lint. Chaired by Bruce & Lea Farr. Official website.
October 31– November 3, 2002	Minneapolis Hilton & Towers; Minneapolis, Minnesota, US	Theme for 2002 is "Of Gods and Monsters". Guests of Honor: Dennis Etchison, Jonathan Carroll, Kathe Koja, Dave McKean, and Stephen Jones. Chaired by Greg Ketter. Website archive.
October 30– November 2, 2003	Hyatt Regency Washington; Washington, D.C., US	Theme for 2003 is "Dark Fantasy: Honorable Traditions". Author Guests of Honor: Brian Lumley and Jack Williamson. (Williamson was unable to attend.) Publisher Guest of Honor: W. Paul Ganley. Artist Guest of Honor: Allen Koszowski. Master of Ceremonies: Douglas E. Winter. Chaired by Michael J. Walsh. Official website
October 28–31, 2004	Tempe Mission Palms Hotel; Tempe, Arizona, US	Theme for 2004 is "Women in Fantasy and Horror". Author Guest of Honour: Gwyneth Jones. Artist Guest of Honor: Janny Wurts. Editor Guest of Honor: Ellen Datlow. Publisher Guest of Honor: Betty Ballantine. Toastmistress: Jennifer Roberson. Chaired by Mike Willmoth with vice-chair Larry Vela. Official website
November 3–6, 2005	The Madison Concourse; Hotel & Governor's Club; Madison, Wisconsin, US	Theme for 2005 is "The Architecture of Fantasy & Horror". Guests of Honor: Graham Joyce, Robert Weinberg, Terri Windling. Artist Guest of Honor: Kinuko Y. Craft. Toastmaster: Peter Straub. Special Recognition: Arkham House. Chaired by Meg Turville-Heitz. Official website
November 2–5, 2006	Renaissance Hotel; Austin, Texas, US	Theme for 2006 is "Robert E. Howard Centennial". Published Cross Plains Universe celebrating Robert E. Howard. Guests of Honor: Glen Cook, Dave Duncan, Robin Hobb. Toastermater: Bradley Denton, Editor Guest of Honor: Glenn Lord. Artist Guest of Honor: John Jude Palencar. Robert E. Howard Artist Guest: Gary Gianni. Chaired by Renee Babcock and Fred Duarte. Official website
November 1–4, 2007	Saratoga City Center; Saratoga Springs, New York, US	Theme for 2007 is "Ghosts and Revenants". Guests of Honor: Carol Emshwiller, Kim Newman, Lisa Tuttle. Artist Guest of Honor: Jean Giraud (Moebius). Special Guests: Joseph Bruchac, Barbara Roden, Christopher Roden, and George Scithers. Master of Ceremonies: Guy Gavriel Kay. Chaired by Joseph T. Berlant. Official website
October 30– November 2, 2008	Hyatt Regency Calgary; Calgary, Alberta, Canada	Theme for 2008 is "Mystery in Fantasy and Horror". Guests of Honor: David Morrell, Barbara Hambly, Tom Doherty. Artist Guest of Honor: Todd Lockwood. Toastmaster: Tad Williams. Chaired by Randy McCharles with vice-chair Kristiina Anderson. Website archive
October 29– November 1, 2009	Fairmont San Jose Hotel; San Jose, California, US	Theme for 2009 is "Celebrating Edgar Allan Poe's 200th Birthday". Guests of Honor: Garth Nix, Lisa Snellings, Michael Swanwick, Ann VanderMeer, Jeff VanderMeer, Zoran Živković, Donald Sidney-Fryer, and Richard A. Lupoff. Toastmaster: Jay Lake. Chaired by David Gallaher with vice-chair Rina Weisman. Official website
October 28–31, 2010	Hyatt Regency Columbus; Columbus, Ohio, US	Theme for 2010 is "the Whimsical Side of Fantasy". Guests of Honor: Dennis McKiernan, Esther Friesner, David Hartwell, and Darrell K. Sweet. Chaired by Larry Smith and Sally Kobee. Official website
October 27–30, 2011	Town and Country; Resort and Convention Center; San Diego, California, US	Theme for 2011 is "Sailing the Seas of Imagination". Guests of Honor: Jo Fletcher, Neil Gaiman, Parke Godwin, Shawna McCarthy, and Ruth Sanderson. Toastmaster: Connie Willis. Chaired by Val Ontell. Official website
November 1–4, 2012	Sheraton Parkway Toronto North; Toronto, Canada	Theme for 2012 is "Northern Gothic and Urban Fantasy". Guests of Honor: Elizabeth Hand, John Clute, Richard A. Kirk, and Charles de Lint. Toastmaster: Gary K. Wolfe. Chaired by Peter Halasz. Official website
October 31– November 3, 2013	Hilton Brighton Metropole; Brighton, UK	Theme for 2013 is "Arthur Machen @ 150". Dedicated to the memory of Richard Matheson. Guests of Honour: Joanne Harris, Joe Hill, Richard Christian Matheson, Alan Lee, and Brian Aldiss. Master of Ceremonies: China Miéville. Co-Chairs: Amanda Foubister, Stephen Jones, Michael Marshall Smith. Official website
November 6–9, 2014	Hyatt Regency Crystal City; Arlington County, Virginia, US	The theme is 1914, a time of transition, a commemoration of the births of the artist Virgil Finlay and the author Robert Aickman, as well as the beginning of World War I. Guests of Honor: Guy Gavriel Kay, Les Edwards, Stuart David Schiff, Lail Finlay. Toastmaster: Mary Robinette Kowal Co-Chairs: Peggy Rae Sapienza & Michael J. Walsh. (Jane Yolen was originally slated to be Toastmaster but was forced to cancel her appearance due to medical issues.) Official website
November 5–8, 2015	Saratoga City Center and Saratoga Hilton; Saratoga Springs, New York, US	The theme is epic fantasy. Guests of Honor: Chelsea Quinn Yarbro, Steven Erikson. Toastmaster: Graham Joyce, Special Guests: David Drake and Glen Cook. Chair: Joseph Berlant Official website
October 27–30, 2016	Greater Columbus Convention Center and; the Hyatt Regency Columbus; Columbus, Ohio, US	The theme: “Flights of Fantasy.” Official website
November 2–5, 2017	Wyndham Riverwalk; San Antonio, Texas, US	The theme was "Secret Histories." Guests of Honor: Tananarive Due, Karen Joy Fowler, Gregory Manchess, David Mitchell, Toastmaster: Martha Wells Official website
November 1–4, 2018	Renaissance Baltimore Harborplace Hotel; Baltimore, Maryland, US	Guests of Honor: Kaaron Warren, Scott Edelman, Tom Kidd and Michael J. Walsh – Special Guest Aliette de Bodard, and Toastmaster Linda D. Addison Official Website
October 31 – November 3, 2019	Marriott Los Angeles Airport Hotel; Los Angeles, California, US	Guest of Honor: Tad Williams. Special Guest of Honor: Margo Lanagan. Special Guest: Beth Meacham. Toastmaster: Robert Silverberg. Official Website
October 29 – November 1, 2020	Little America Hotel; Salt Lake City, Utah, US - Virtual Convention	Author Guest of Honor: Stephen Gallagher. Artist Guest of Honor: David Cherry. Editor Guest of Honor: Anne Groell. Author Special Guest: Stephen Graham Jones. Toastmasters Tracy and Laura Hickman. Official Website
November 4 – 7, 2021	Hotel Montreal Bonaventure; Montreal, Canada	Author Guest of Honor: Nisi Shawl. Artist Guest of Honor: John Picacio. Editor Guest of Honor: André-François Ruaud. Special Guests: Owl Goingback, Yves Meynard. Toastmaster Christine Taylor-Butler. Official Website
November 3 – 6, 2022	Hyatt Regency New Orleans; New Orleans, Louisiana, US	Theme: Old Souls and New Rhythms. Author Guest of Honor: Victor LaValle, Jo Walton. Artist Guest of Honor: Iris Compiet. Editor Guest of Honor: Ginjer Buchanan. Special Guests: Caitlín R. Kiernan, Andrei Codrescu. Toastmaster Ursula Vernon. Official Website
October 26 – 29, 2023	Sheraton Crown Center; Kansas City, Missouri, US	Author Guest of Honor: Kij Johnson, Adam-Troy Castro. Artist Guest of Honor: Elizabeth Leggett, Vincent Villafranca. Editor Guest of Honor: Jonathan Strahan. Special Guests: Pat Cadigan. Toastmaster Steve Barnes, Tananarive Due. Official Website
October 17 – 20, 2024	Sheraton Niagara Falls; Niagara Falls, New York, US	Author Guest of Honor: Heather Graham, Scott H. Andrews. Artist Guest of Honor: Galen Dara. Special Guests: P. Djèlí Clark. Toastmaster Michael Swanwick. Official Website
October 30 – November 2, 2025	DoubleTree by Hilton Brighton Metropole; Brighton, UK	Theme: Lyrical Fantasy and 50 Years of British Fantasy and Horror. Official Website
October 22 – 25, 2026	Oakland Convention Center; Oakland, California, US	Theme: A Beacon of Becoming and Belonging. Official Website

== See also ==
- World Fantasy Award
