= Wil Wheaton =

American actor (born 1972)

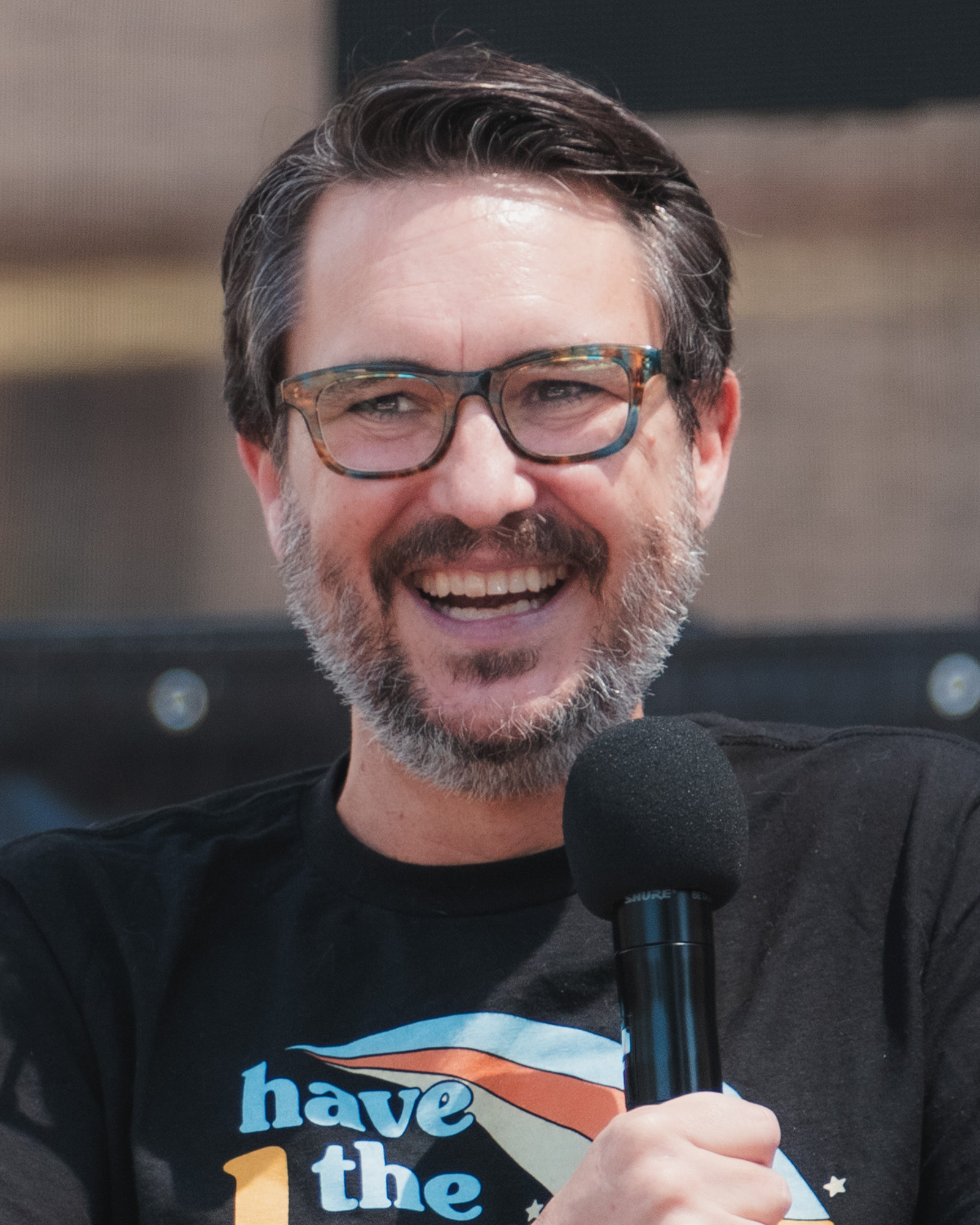
- Wheaton in 2026
- Born: Richard William Wheaton III; July 29, 1972 (age 54); Burbank, California, U.S.
- Occupations: Actor; blogger; narrator; writer; television personality
- Years active: 1980–present
- Spouse: Anne Prince (m. 1999)
- Children: 2
- Website: wilwheaton.net

Richard William "Wil" Wheaton III (born July 29, 1972) is an American actor and writer. He portrayed Wesley Crusher on the television series Star Trek: The Next Generation, Gordie Lachance in the film Stand by Me, Joey Trotta in Toy Soldiers, and Bennett Hoenicker in Flubber.

Wheaton has also appeared in recurring voice acting roles as Aqualad in Teen Titans, Cosmic Boy in Legion of Super Heroes, Martin Brisby in The Secret of NIMH, and Mike Morningstar/Darkstar in the Ben 10 franchise's original continuity. He appeared frequently as a fictionalized version of himself on the sitcom The Big Bang Theory and in the roles of Fawkes on The Guild, Colin Mason on Leverage, and Dr. Isaac Parrish on Eureka.

Wheaton was the host and co-creator of the YouTube board game show TableTop. He has narrated numerous audio books, including Ready Player One and The Martian.

== Early life ==
Richard William Wheaton III was born July 29, 1972, in Burbank, California, to Debra "Debbie" Nordean (née O'Connor), an actress, and Richard William Wheaton Jr., a medical specialist. He has a brother, Jeremy, and a sister, Amy, both of whom appeared uncredited in the Star Trek: The Next Generation episode "When the Bough Breaks". Amy appeared alongside Wil in the 1987 film The Curse.

As an adult, Wheaton described his father as being emotionally abusive and sometimes physically abusive to him as a child and his mother as being an enabler of that abuse. He also stated that his parents forced him to become an actor. In a 2021 interview, he said that his father was a bully who openly loved his brother and sister more than him. In 2023, he claimed that his parents stole his childhood earnings.

== Acting career ==
=== Early work and Stand by Me ===
Wheaton made his acting debut with a small role in the television film A Long Way Home (1981), which starred Timothy Hutton and Rosanna Arquette. He voiced the character of Martin in the animated film The Secret of NIMH (1982), the film adaptation of Robert C. O'Brien's book Mrs. Frisby and the Rats of NIMH (1971). Wheaton also appeared in Hambone and Hillie (1983), The Buddy System (1984) (opposite Richard Dreyfuss and Susan Sarandon), and The Last Starfighter. His lines in Starfighter were ultimately cut from the theatrical release, but Wheaton is still visible in several scenes.

Wheaton first gained widespread attention for his work in Stand by Me (1986), the film adaptation of Stephen King's novella The Body. In Stand by Me, Wheaton played the lead role of Gordie Lachance, a 12-year-old storyteller mourning the loss of his elder brother. In her review of the film, Sheila Benson of the Los Angeles Times wrote that "Wheaton makes Gordie's 'sensitivity' tangible, but not effete. He's a gem". In addition to being successful at the box office, Stand by Me was nominated for the Golden Globe Award for Best Motion Picture – Drama and became known as a coming-of-age classic.

=== Star Trek ===
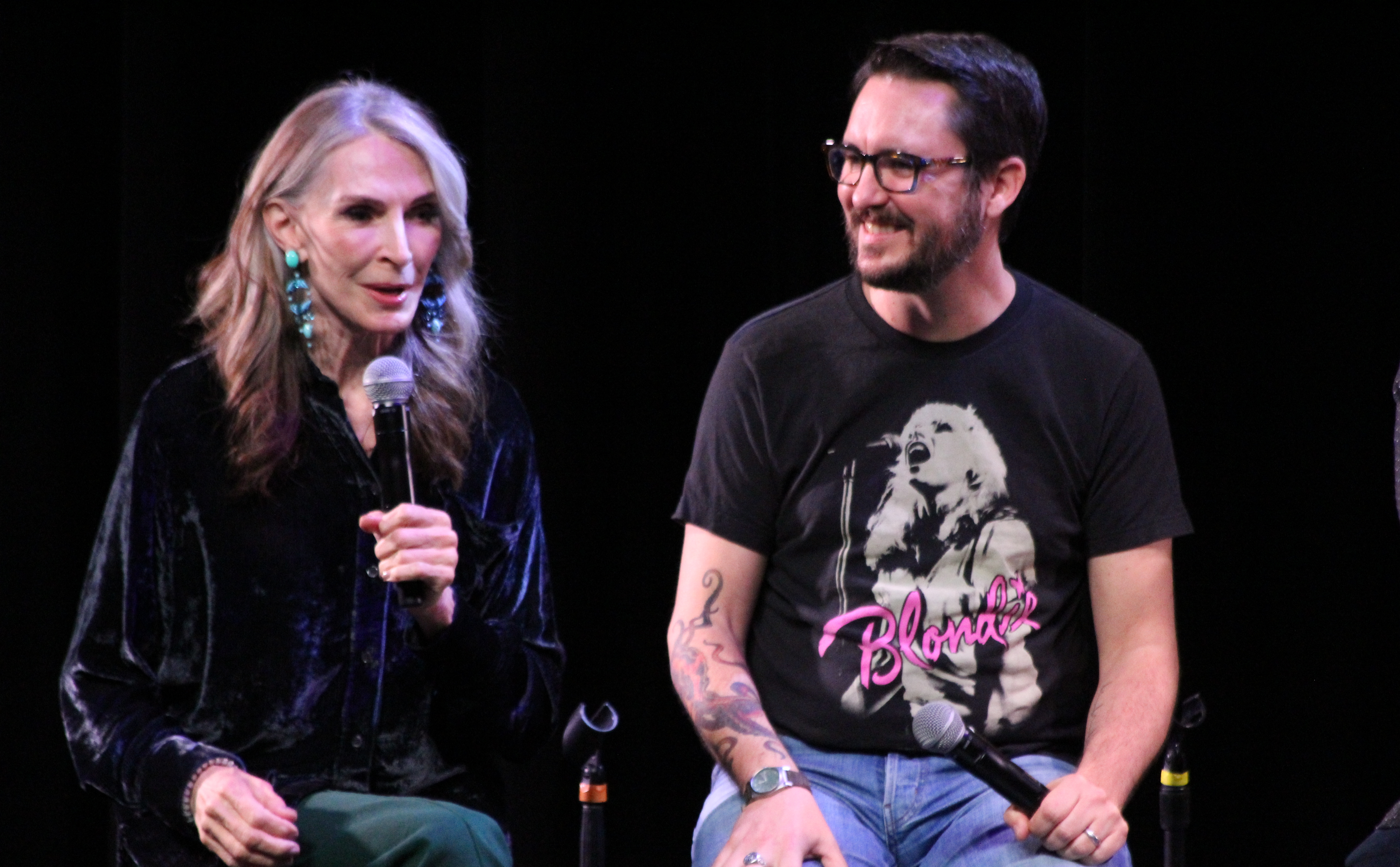
Wheaton with TNG co-star Gates McFadden (who played his mother on the show) in January 2019

Wheaton played Wesley Crusher during the first four seasons of Star Trek: The Next Generation, a "boy genius and Starfleet hopeful" who creator Gene Roddenberry based on himself. He appeared in an additional four episodes of the remaining three seasons. The character is seen as one of the most "polarizing" in the franchise; while many Star Trek fans love Wesley, others are vocal about their hatred of him. Wheaton commented on his critics in a 2004 interview for WebTalk Radio:

Later, I determined that the people who were really, really cruel – like the Usenet weenies – really are a statistically insignificant number of people. And I know, just over the years from people who've e-mailed me at my website and people who I've talked to since I started going to Star Trek conventions again in the last five years, that there are so many more people who really enjoyed everything about the show, including my performance, including the character.

He left the series due to concerns over how the production team addressed a scheduling conflict related to his wish to appear in the 1989 film Valmont.

Wheaton returned to Star Trek in 2002, 2022 and 2024, reprising his Wesley Crusher role in cameo appearances in Star Trek: Nemesis, the season 2 finale of Star Trek: Picard, and as a voice actor in the second season of the animated show Star Trek: Prodigy.

=== Post-Star Trek ===
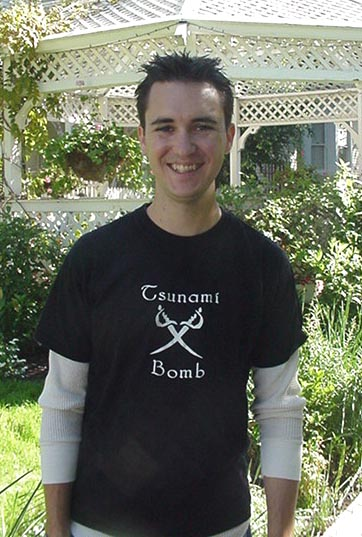
Wheaton in 2001

Wheaton played Joey Trotta in the action film Toy Soldiers (1991). After leaving Star Trek, he moved to Topeka, Kansas, to work for NewTek, where he helped to develop the Video Toaster 4000 doing product testing and quality control and later used his public profile to serve as a technology evangelist for the product.

Afterward, he returned to Los Angeles, attended acting school for five years, and then re-entered the acting world.

In the late 1990s and early 2000s, Wheaton appeared in several independent films, including the short film The Good Things (2001), in which he portrays a frustrated Kansas tollbooth worker. For his performance in Jane White Is Sick & Twisted (2002) he received the award for Best Actor at the Melbourne Underground Film Festival.

Wheaton regularly portrayed a fictionalized version of himself on The Big Bang Theory, becoming a recurring guest star and then side character on the show.

He also appears in a The Big Bang Theory spin-off, Stuart Fails to Save the Universe, again as himself, as the viewer follows the continued story through different universes.

In June 2024, Wheaton announced that he was retired from on-screen acting.

=== Voice work ===
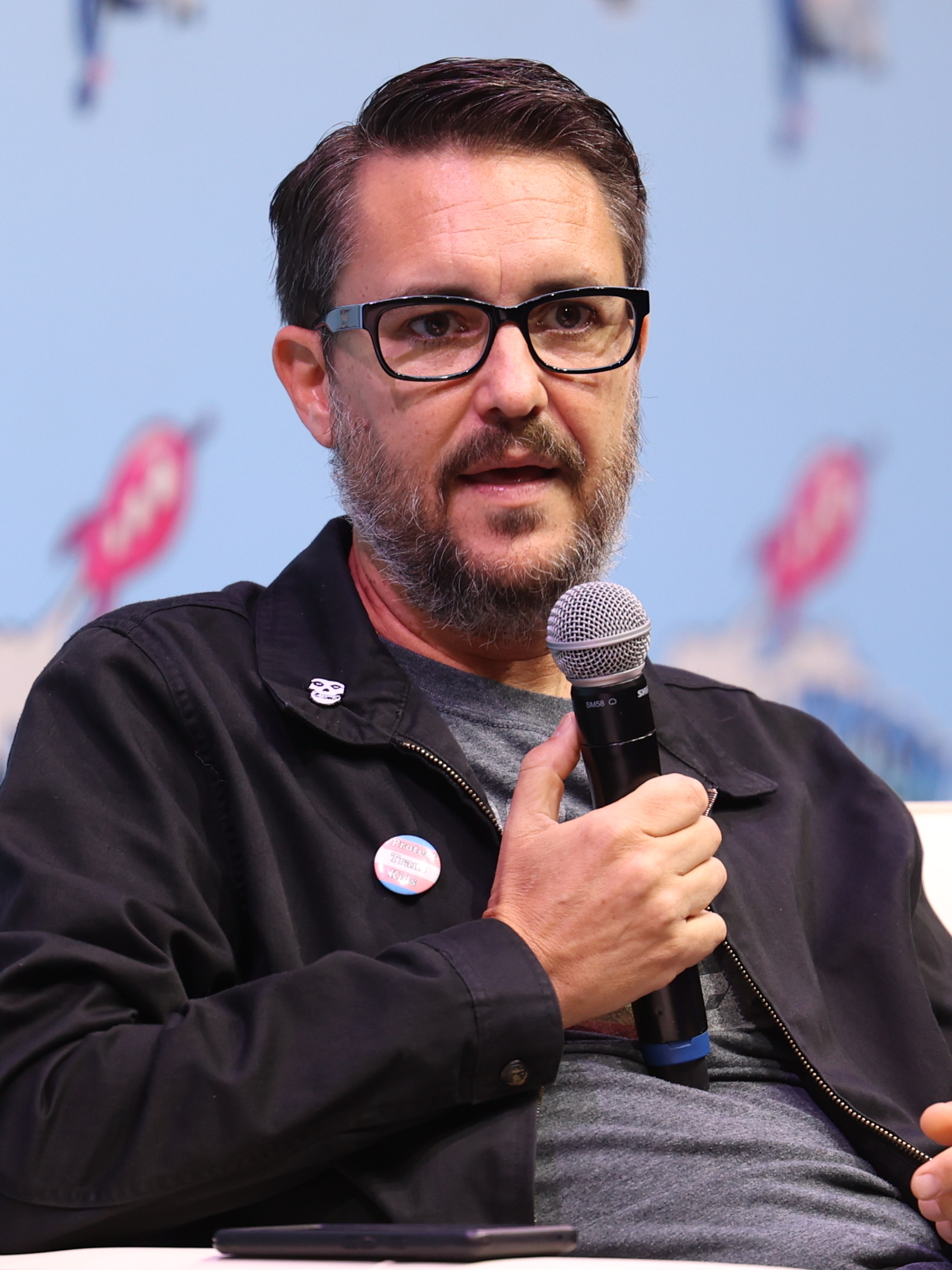
Wheaton at the 2024 GalaxyCon Raleigh

Wheaton is known for his voice acting career. He voiced the role of Martin Brisby in The Secret of NIMH in 1981. Wheaton voiced the villainous John Juniper in the 2021 video game, I Expect You to Die 2: The Spy and the Liar.

=== Television and web ===
In 2010, Wheaton appeared in 12 episodes in a recurring, guest-starring role on Eureka, playing Dr. Isaac Parrish, the head of the Non-Lethal Weapons Lab at Global Dynamics and a thorn in Fargo's side. Wheaton also voices the character of the former scoutmaster and current sous-chef Earl Harlan in the podcast Welcome to Night Vale.

== Non-acting professional ventures ==
=== Hosting ===
From September 2006 to September 2007, Wheaton hosted a Revision3 syndicated video podcast called InDigital along with Jessica Corbin and Hahn Choi. He hosted a NASA video on the Mars Curiosity rover which landed on Monday August 6, 2012. He has hosted "2nd Watch", interviews with cast members and producers of the science-fiction series Falling Skies that appears online after each episode. On April 3, 2014, Wheaton announced on his blog that his new show called The Wil Wheaton Project would premiere on the SyFy network at 10 pm on May 27 for an initial projected run of twelve episodes. However, on August 29, Wheaton blogged that SyFy canceled the show after only one season. Wheaton has hosted the Star Trek aftershow The Ready Room since the second season in 2020.

=== Games ===
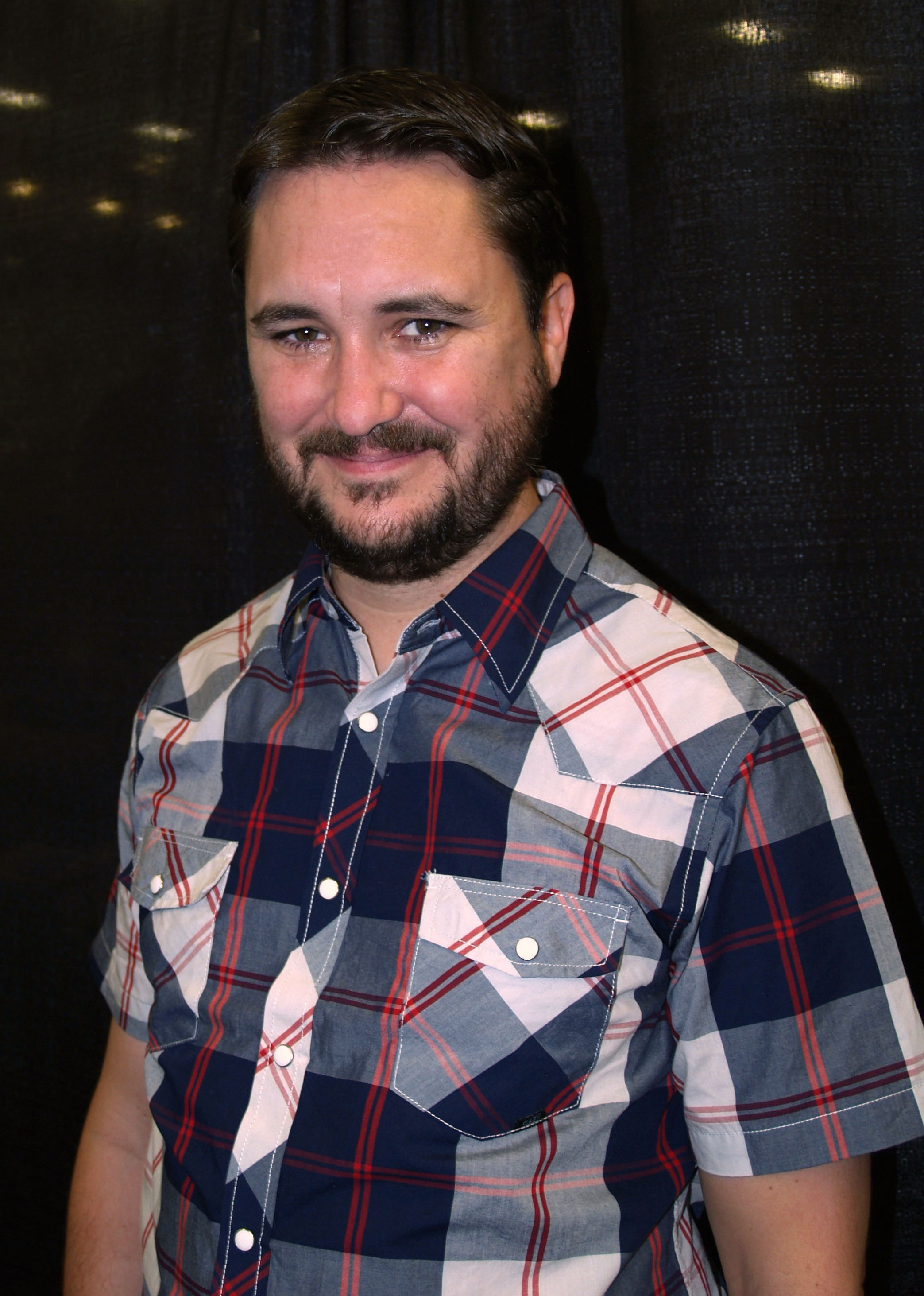
Wheaton at the 2013 Wizard World New York Experience in Manhattan

Wheaton is a Dungeons & Dragons player, and played during the PAX 2010 event using the 4th edition rules. Wheaton, along with webcartoonists Jerry Holkins and Mike Krahulik of Penny Arcade, and Scott Kurtz of PvP, played in front of a live audience. The game was hosted and recorded by Wizards of the Coast with Chris Perkins as the dungeonmaster.

Wheaton starred in the Kickstarter-funded game There Came an Echo by Iridium Studios. In Dungeons and Dragons Online, he became the dungeon master of the Temple of Elemental Evil quests.

Nintendo of America announced on Twitter that Wheaton would be voicing Abraham Lincoln in Code Name: STEAM. Wheaton does the voice narration on the Secret Hitler companion app for the Secret Hitler social deduction game.

Wheaton has spoken out against misogyny in video game culture, and wrote a profile of Anita Sarkeesian for the 2015 Time 100.

=== Comic book ===
A fictionalized version of Wheaton was included in the comic book PS 238, in which he harbors the power of telekinesis. Wheaton's debut comic book The Guild: Fawkes, which he wrote alongside Felicia Day, was released on May 23, 2012.

=== Narrations ===
Wil Wheaton has been a narrator for dozens of audiobooks, including his own works. He has been a finalist for the Audie Award multiple times, and received an Earphones Award from AudioFile magazine.

List of narrations
Title	Author	Audiobook release date	Additional narrators
Peter and Max: A Fables Novel	Bill Willingham	2009-12-08	Unknown
Homeland	Cory Doctorow	2014	No
More of the Best of Science Fiction and Fantasy	Orson Scott Card et al.	1999-12-15	Yes
The Greatest Science Fiction Stories of the 20th Century	Greg Bear et al.	1999-12-16	Yes
The Criminal Minds Production Diary	Wil Wheaton	2009-03-04	No
The Adventures of Tom Sawyer	Mark Twain	2009-10-21	No
Boneshaker	Cherie Priest	2010-03-18	Yes
METAtropolis: Cascadia	John Scalzi et al.	2010-11-16	Yes
The Android's Dream	John Scalzi	2010-12-07	No
Agent to the Stars	John Scalzi	2010-12-07	No
Fuzzy Nation	John Scalzi	2011-05-10	Yes
Ready Player One	Ernest Cline	2011-08-16	No
Redshirts	John Scalzi	2012-06-05	No
Masters of Doom	David Kushner	2012-07-12	No
Trumps of Doom	Roger Zelazny	2012-07-31	No
Prince of Chaos	Roger Zelazny	2012-07-31	No
Sign of Chaos	Roger Zelazny	2012-07-31	No
Knight of Shadows	Roger Zelazny	2012-07-31	No
Blood of Amber	Roger Zelazny	2012-07-31	No
V Wars	Jonathan Maberry et al.	2012-10-10	Yes
Rip-Off!	John Scalzi et al.	2012-12-18	Yes
Just A Geek: The Audio Book	Wil Wheaton	2013-11-23	No
Dancing Barefoot: The Audio Book	Wil Wheaton	2013-12-07	No
The Happiest Days of Our Lives: The Special Extended Edition Audio Book	Wil Wheaton	2013-12-10	No
Dead Pig Collector	Warren Ellis	2013-12-17	No
Byways: A METAtropolis Story	Tobias Buckell	2014-01-30	No
Suspect Zero	Richard Kadrey	2014-07-01	No
If Ever They Happened Upon My Lair	R. A. Salvatore	2014-08-11	No
Lock In	John Scalzi	2014-08-26	No
What If?: Serious Scientific Answers to Absurd Hypothetical Questions	Randall Munroe	2014-09-02	No
The Education of Brother Thaddius and Other Tales of DemonWars	R. A. Salvatore	2015-01-13	Yes
Mather's Blood	R. A. Salvatore	2015-01-13	No
The Adventures of Huckleberry Finn [Phoenix Books Edition]	Mark Twain	2015-01-14	No
Armada	Ernest Cline	2015-07-14	No
Prepare to Meet Thy Doom	David Kushner	2015-10-15	No
The Collapsing Empire	John Scalzi	2017-03-21	No
Dead Trees Give No Shelter	Wil Wheaton	2017-04-08	No
asteraleS	Wil Wheaton	2017-04-26	No
kamaKiri	Wil Wheaton	2017-05-04	No
Strange Weather	Joe Hill	2017-10-24	Yes
Head On	John Scalzi	2018-04-17	No
The Consuming Fire	John Scalzi	2018-10-16	No
Alexander X	Edward Savio	2019-06-05	No
Ancient Among Us	Edward Savio	2019-07-30	No
How To: Absurd Scientific Advice for Common Real-World Problems	Randall Munroe	2019-09-03	No
Looking for Alaska	John Green	2019-09-24	No
Full Throttle	Joe Hill	2019-10-01	Yes
The Martian	Andy Weir	2020-01-01	No
The Last Emperox	John Scalzi	2020-04-14	No
Ready Player Two	Ernest Cline	2020-11-24	No
How to Avoid a Climate Disaster	Bill Gates	2021-02-16	Yes
Still Just a Geek: The Audiobook	Wil Wheaton	2022-04-12	Yes
Red Team Blues	Cory Doctorow	2023-04-23	No
The Bezzle	Cory Doctorow	2024-02-20	No

=== Live shows ===
Wheaton has performed improvisational and sketch comedy at the ACME Comedy Theater in Hollywood. He has a traveling sketch comedy/improv troupe called "EarnestBorg9" that performs science fiction-related comedy at conventions.

=== Writing ===
Wheaton is the author of Dancing Barefoot (2004) and Just a Geek (2004). He released a revised follow-up, Still Just a Geek, in 2022.

Wheaton runs his own blog, Wil Wheaton Dot Net. In June 2005, he became that month's featured Tech writer for the SuicideGirls Newswire.

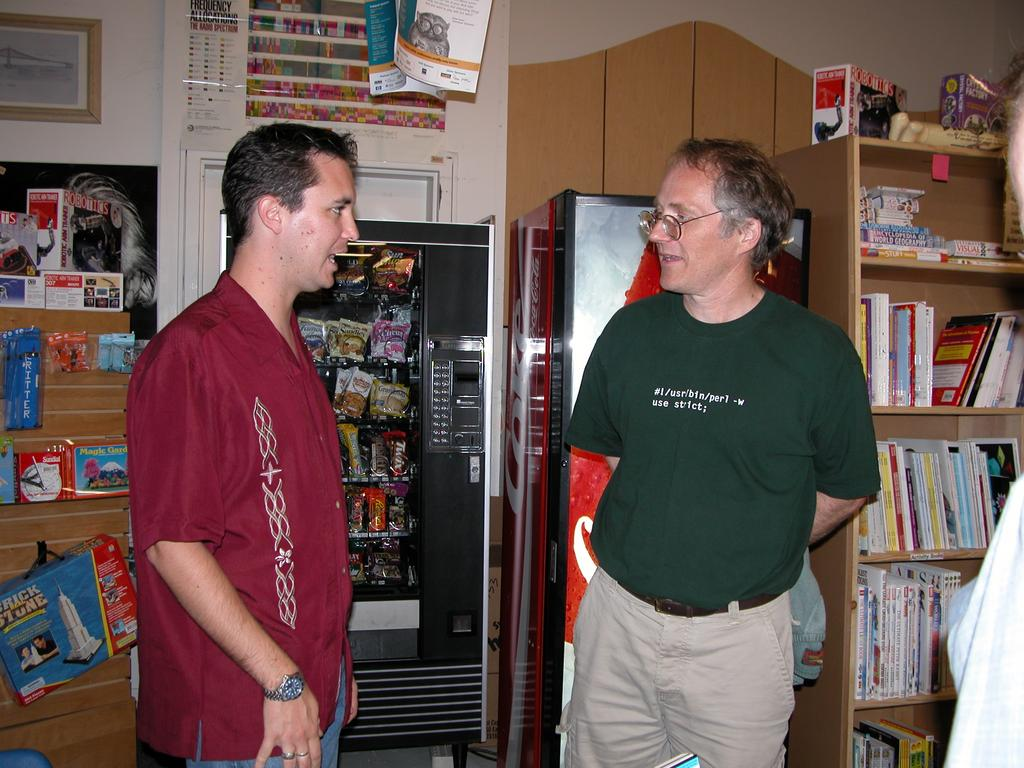
Wil Wheaton (left) meets Tim O'Reilly at the 2003 booksigning of Dancing Barefoot at Powell's in Portland, Oregon.

In 2017, Wheaton wrote the short story "Laina" for the Star Wars anthology From a Certain Point of View. The book features 40 short stories, each by a different author, to commemorate the 40th anniversary of Star Wars.

=== It's Storytime with Wil Wheaton ===
In March 2025, Wheaton launched a podcast titled It's Storytime with Wil Wheaton. The series includes Wheaton narrating selections of stories selected from Lightspeed Magazine, Uncanny Magazine, Clarkesworld Magazine, and On Spec.

== Personal life ==
Wheaton married Anne Prince on November 7, 1999. Wheaton legally adopted her two sons at their request when they reached the age of majority.

Wheaton was roommates with Chris Hardwick while Chris attended UCLA. They met at a showing of Arachnophobia in Burbank, California.

Wheaton has struggled with alcohol addiction. In January 2021, Wheaton announced he had been sober for five years.

As of 2021, Wheaton was estranged from his parents.

Wheaton lives with complex post-traumatic stress disorder, generalized anxiety disorder, and chronic depression. He supports mental health nonprofit organizations in raising awareness for these conditions.

In 2022, Wheaton participated in Celebrity Jeopardy!, playing for the National Women's Law Center. He reached the finals, defeating Troian Bellisario and Hasan Minhaj in the quarterfinals, and John Michael Higgins and Joel Kim Booster in the semi-finals. He finished in third place, behind winner Ike Barinholtz and runner-up Patton Oswalt, earning $100,000.

=== Politics ===
Wheaton campaigned for Hillary Clinton in the 2016 general election.

Immediately following the Sutherland Springs church shooting on November 5, 2017, Wheaton on Twitter stated in response to Congressman Paul Ryan's call for prayers for the victims that, "The murdered victims were in a church. If prayers did anything, they'd still be alive, you worthless sack of shit." Wheaton subsequently clarified his opinion after receiving criticism, writing, "I apologize to those of you who are sincere people of Faith, who felt attacked by me," but accused "the right wing noise machine" of using his comments "to deflect attention and anger away from the role that unfettered access to weapons of mass murder played in the latest incidence of mass murder in America."

In September 2024, Wheaton joined other actors from the Star Trek franchise on a livestream to support the campaign of Vice President Kamala Harris in the 2024 United States presidential election.

== Honors ==
- Young Artist Awards: 1989 & 1987
- Melbourne Underground Film Festival: Best Actor (2002)
- International Academy of Web Television Awards: Best Host (Pre-Recorded) (2014)
- Saturn Awards: Lifetime Achievement Award – The Cast of Star Trek: The Next Generation (2024) (Note: "The Lifetime Achievement Award is usually presented to an individual for their contributions to genre entertainment. Top luminaries like Stan Lee and Leonard Nimoy, Mr. Spock himself, have received this top honor. It's not new, but we extended this award to cover the entire cast of Star Trek: The Next Generation, due to its continued influence on the face of general television. It was originally doomed to failure since it was following in the footsteps of the original Star Trek, yet it carved its own identity, and its diverse cast was light years ahead of its time!" —Academy of Science Fiction, Fantasy and Horror Films)

An asteroid was named after him: 391257 Wilwheaton.

== Filmography ==
=== Film ===
Year	Title	Role	Notes
1983	Hambone and Hillie	Jeff Radcliffe	
1983	The Buddy System	Tim Price	
1984	The Last Starfighter	Louis' friend	
1986	Stand by Me	Gordie Lachance	
1987	The Curse	Zack	
1988	She's Having a Baby	Eloy	
1991	December	Kipp Gibbs	
1991	Toy Soldiers	Joseph Trotta	
1993	The Liars' Club	David Reynolds	
1995	Mr. Stitch	Lazarus	
1996	Pie in the Sky	Jack	
1996	Boys' Night Out	Marco	
1997	Trekkies	Himself	Documentary
1997	Flubber	Bennett Hoenicker	
1997	Tales of Glamour and Excess	Danny Sugerman	
1998	Fag Hag	Christian Bookstore Manager	
1999	Foreign Correspondents	Jonas	
2000	The Girls' Room	Charlie	
2000	Deep Core	Rodney Bedecker	
2001	Speechless...	Ryan	Short film
2001	The Good Things	Zach Means	Short film
2002	Jane White Is Sick & Twisted	Dick Smith	
2002	Fish Don't Blink	Jimmy	
2002	Walking the Tracks: The Summer of Stand by Me	Himself	Documentary
2002	Star Trek: Nemesis	Wesley Crusher	Cameo & deleted scenes
2003	Neverland	John Darling	
2007	Americanizing Shelley	Director Alan Smithee	
2009	Star Trek	Romulans (various)	
2010	Loki and SageKing Go to GenCon	Evil Wil Wheaton	Short film
2014	Sharknado 2: The Second One	Himself (airline passenger)	Uncredited
2014	Video Games: The Movie	Himself	Documentary
2020	Max Reload and the Nether Blasters	Arcade Heroes Narrator (voice)	
2020	Rent-A-Pal	Andy	
2022	In Search of Tomorrow	Himself	Documentary

=== Television ===
Year	Title	Role	Notes
1981	A Long Way Home	Donald Branch	Television film
1982	CBS Afternoon Playhouse	Amos Cotter	Episode: "The Shooting"
1983	13 Thirteenth Avenue	Willie	Television film
1985	Highway to Heaven	Max	Episode: "One Winged Angels"
1986	The Defiant Ones	Clyde	Television film
1986	Long Time Gone	Mitchell	Television film
1986	St. Elsewhere	Owen Drimmer	Episode: "Nothing Up My Sleeve"
1987	Disneyland	Ehrich Weiss / Harry Houdini	Episode: "Young Harry Houdini"
1987	Family Ties	Timothy Higgins	Episode: "'D' Is for Date"
1987	The Man Who Fell to Earth	Billy Milton	Television film
1987–1994	Star Trek: The Next Generation	Wesley Crusher	Main role; 85 episodes
1989	ABC Afterschool Special	Nick Karpinsky	Episode: "My Dad Can't Be Crazy... Can He?"
1990	Monsters	Kevin	Episode: "A Shave and a Haircut, Two Bites"
1991	The Last Prostitute	Danny	Television film
1992	Star Trek 25th Anniversary Special	Himself, Wesley Crusher	Documentary
1992	Lifestories: Families in Crisis	Robert Bierer	Episode: "A Deadly Secret: The Robert Bierer Story"
1993	Tales from the Crypt	Arling	Episode: "House of Horror"
1994	Sirens	Wayne McGarrick	Episode: "Chasing a Ghost"
1995	It Was Him or Us	Scottie	Television film
1996	The Outer Limits	Cadet	Episode: "The Light Brigade"
1997	Gun	Bilchick	Episode: "Ricochet"
1997	Perversions of Science	Bryan	Episode: "Snap Ending"
1998	The Love Boat: The Next Wave	Tristan Reedy	Episode "I Can't Get No Satisfaction"
1998	Diagnosis: Murder	Forest Ranger Gary Barton	Episode: "Alienated"
1998	The Day Lincoln Was Shot	Robert Lincoln	Television film
1999	Guys Like Us	Steve, The Fig	Episode: "Good Old Days"
1999	Chicken Soup for the Soul	Will	Episode: "The Wallet"
2000	Python	Thommy	Television film
2001	Weakest Link: Star Trek Edition	Self - Celebrity Contestant	Television game: season 2, episode 13
2001	The Invisible Man	Dorman	Episode: "Perchance to Dream"
2001	Twice in a Lifetime	Ryan Storey, Dr. Thomas	Episode: "The Choice"
2002	A&E Biography	Narrator	Episode: "Eclipsed by Death: The Life of River Phoenix"
2002	Arena	Presenter	Unknown episodes
2002–2003	The Screen Savers	Presenter	2 episodes
2003	Book of Days	Danny	Television film
2003	Four Fingers of the Dragon	Himself	Television film
2005	CSI: Crime Scene Investigation	Walter	Episode: "Compulsion"
2007	Numb3rs	Miles Sklar	Episode: "Graphic"
2008	Criminal Minds	Floyd Hansen	Episode: "Paradise"
2009–2011	Leverage	Colin Mason	Recurring role
2008–2010	Ben 10: Alien Force	Michael Morningstar(Darkstar)	Recurring role
2009–2019	The Big Bang Theory	Wil Wheaton	Recurring role; 17 episodes
2010–2012	Eureka	Dr. Isaac Parrish	Recurring role (Season 4–5)
2014	The Wil Wheaton Project	Presenter	12 episodes
2015–2016	Dark Matter	Alexander Rook	2 episodes
2016	Powers	Conrad Moody	3 episodes
2017	Mystery Science Theater 3000	Drake	Episode: "Reptilicus"
2017	Bill Nye Saves the World	Himself	Episode: "The Original Martian Invasion"
2017	Whose Line Is It Anyway?	Himself	"July 10, 2017" (Season 13, Episode 5)
2019	Supergirl	End of the World Protestor	Episode: "Crisis on Infinite Earths: Part One"
2022	Star Trek: Picard	Wesley Crusher	Episode: "Farewell"
2022	S.W.A.T.	Evan Whitlock	Episode: "Old School Cool"
2022–2023	Celebrity Jeopardy!	Self - Celebrity Contestant	3 episodes
2026	Stuart Fails to Save the Universe	Wil Wheaton	Episode: "Spoiler: Bert Is Magic"

=== Web shows and series ===
List of appearances in web shows and series
Year	Title	Role	Notes
2006–2007	Revision3	Presenter	
2007	LoadingReadyRun	Himself	
2008	Retarded Policeman #5: Writers Strike	Presenter	
2009–2011	The Guild	Fawkes	Main role
2010	IRrelevant Astronomy	The Physician	Episode: "Robot Astronomy Talk Show: Destroyer of Worlds"
2012–2017	TableTop	Presenter	
2013	Kris and Scott's Scott and Kris Show #10: Ties	Kris's father	
2014–2016	Welcome to Night Vale	Earl Harlan	5 episodes, multiple live shows
2015	Titansgrave: The Ashes of Valkana	Game Master	Actual play
2015	Conversations with Creators	Host	
2015	Critical Role	Thorbir Falbek	Actual play; guest role, 2 episodes
2015	Con Man	Officer Cahoots, Man on Plane	2 episodes
2017	Transformers: Titans Return	Perceptor	Voice, 3 episodes
2020–present	The Ready Room	Host	84 episodes
2020–2021	Rival Speak	Host	12 episodes
2021	Bridgewater	Captain Haddock	Voice, fiction podcast
2022	The Sandman	Brant Tucker	Voice, 4 episodes
2023	Third Eye	Robigus	Voice
2025	Tales From Woodcreek	Eldorae	Actual play; guest role, 2 episodes

=== Animation ===
List of voice performances in animated films and television series
Year	Title	Role	Notes
1982	The Secret of NIMH	Martin Brisby	Feature film
1993	The Legend of Prince Valiant	Prince Michael / King Michael	Main role (season 2)
2001	The Flintstones: On the Rocks	Brad (Bass Singer)	Television film
2002	The Zeta Project	Kevin	Episode: "The Wrong Morph"
2003–2005	Teen Titans	Aqualad	Recurring role (6 episodes)
2005	Super Robot Monkey Team Hyperforce Go!	Skurg	Episode: "The Lords of Soturix 7"
2006	Avatar: The Last Airbender	Additional voices	Episode: "City of Walls and Secrets"
2007	Random! Cartoons	Kyle, Sir Horace	Episode: "Kyle + Rosemary"
2007–2008	Legion of Super Heroes	Cosmic Boy, Roderick Doyle	Recurring role (6 episodes)
2008–2009	Ben 10: Alien Force	Michael Morningstar / Darkstar	Recurring role (5 episodes)
2009	Naruto	Menma	3 episodes, English version
2009	Kurokami: The Animation	Yakumo	Supporting role, English version
2009–2010	Family Guy	Himself, Anti-Abortion Activist	2 episodes
2009–2010	Batman: The Brave and the Bold	Ted Kord/Blue Beetle	2 episodes
2010	Ben 10: Ultimate Alien	Michael Morningstar / Darkstar	Recurring role (3 episodes)
2010	Slayers Evolution-R	Hans	Episode 2, English version
2010	Naruto Shippuden the Movie	Taruho, Shizuku	English version
2011	Mobile Suit Gundam Unicorn	Aaron Terzieff	Episode: "Ghost of Laplace", English version
2011–2012	Redakai: Conquer the Kairu	Quantus	Main role
2012–2013	Generator Rex	Dr. Peter Meechum	4 episodes
2014	Robot Chicken	Doctor Doom, Centaur	Episode: "Batman Forever 21"
2014	Ben 10: Omniverse	Michael Morningstar / Darkstar, Dante	2 episodes
2014–2018	Teen Titans Go!	Aqualad	4 episodes
2015–2018	Miles from Tomorrowland	Commander S'Leet, Nemetron Units	4 episodes
2016	Fantasy Hospital	The High Wizard	10 episodes
2017–2018	Stretch Armstrong and the Flex Fighters	Jonathan Rook, additional voices	23 episodes
2017	Guardians of the Galaxy	Korvac	Episode: "Unfortunate Son"
2018	Teen Titans Go! To the Movies	Flash	Feature film
2018	Power of the Primes	Perceptor	10 episodes
2020	American Dad!	Co-Worker with Witching Sticks	Episode: "Businessly Brunette"
2021–2022	Dogs in Space	Atlas	4 episodes
2023	Star Trek: Lower Decks	Wesley Crusher	Episode: "Old Friends, New Planets"
2024	Star Trek: Prodigy	Wesley Crusher	Main role, Season 2

=== Video games ===
List of voice performances in video games
Year	Title	Role
2003	Crimson Skies: High Road to Revenge	Bandit
2004	EverQuest II	Additional voices
2004	Grand Theft Auto: San Andreas	Richard Burns
2004	Tom Clancy's Ghost Recon 2	Additional voices
2005	Tom Clancy's Rainbow Six: Lockdown	Additional voices
2005	Tom Clancy's Ghost Recon Advanced Warfighter	Additional voices
2005	Grand Theft Auto: Liberty City Stories	Richard Burns
2006	Grand Theft Auto: Vice City Stories	Richard Burns
2007	Tom Clancy's Ghost Recon Advanced Warfighter 2	Additional voices
2008	Grand Theft Auto IV	Alien in Republican Space Rangers
2009	Brütal Legend	Watt-R-Boys
2009	Ben 10 Alien Force: Vilgax Attacks	Darkstar
2010	Fallout: New Vegas	Robobrain
2011	DC Universe Online	Robin
2013	Grand Theft Auto V	The Local Population
2014	Broken Age	Curtis The Lumberjack
2015	There Came an Echo	Corrin
2015	Code Name: S.T.E.A.M.	Abraham Lincoln
2015	Dungeons & Dragons Online - Reign of Elemental Evil	Dungeon Master
2021	I Expect You to Die 2: The Spy and the Liar	John Juniper
2022	Star Trek Online	Terran Emperor Wesley Crusher

== Bibliography ==
- Dancing Barefoot (ISBN 0-596-00674-8) (2004)
- Just a Geek (ISBN 0-596-00768-X) (2004)
- Stories of Strength (ISBN 1-4116-5503-6) (2005; contributor)
- The Happiest Days of Our Lives (ISBN 0-9741160-2-5) (2007)
- Sunken Treasure (2009)
- Memories of the Future Vol. 1 (ISBN 0-9741160-4-1) (2009)
- Wil Wheaton's Criminal Minds Production Diary (2009)
- Clash of the Geeks (2010; contributor)
- The Day After, and Other Stories (2010)
- The Monster in My Closet (2011)
- Hunter (2011)
- Dead Trees Give No Shelter (2017)
- Star Wars: From a Certain Point of View (2017; contributor)
- Still Just a Geek (ISBN 978-0-06-308047-8) (2022)

== See also ==
- List of atheists in film, radio, television and theater
