= Starter Villain =

2023 science fiction novel by John Scalzi

- first edition
- Author: John Scalzi
- Cover artist: Tristan Elwell
- Language: English
- Genre: Science fiction
- Publisher: Tor Books
- Publication date: 2023
- Publication place: United States
- Media type: Print (hardcover), ebook, audiobook
- Pages: 264
- ISBN: 978-0-7653-8922-0

Starter Villain is a science fiction novel written by American author John Scalzi. It was first published in hardcover and ebook by Tor Books, and audiobook by Audible Studios, on September 19, 2023; British hardcover and ebook editions were released by Tor UK on September 21, 2023.

The novel won the 2024 Dragon Award for Best Science Fiction Novel. It was a finalist for the 2024 Hugo Award for Best Novel and was a top ten finalist for the 2024 Locus Award for Best Science Fiction Novel.

== Plot summary ==
Charlie Fitzer, ex-business reporter, ex-spouse, and ex-caregiver to his now-deceased father, is in reduced circumstances. Living with his cats Hera and Persephone in the old family home co-owned with his half-siblings who are keen to sell it, he barely makes a living as a substitute teacher. He aspires to acquire a local tavern whose owner is retiring but is denied a bank loan. His long-estranged uncle Jake Baldwin, billionaire owner of a parking lot empire, dies and Jake's assistant Mathilda Morrison offers to pay a substantial sum for Charlie to represent Jake at the memorial service.

The funeral is attended by dubious individuals obsessed with confirming Jake's death; one attendee attempts to stab the corpse. Charlie's house is destroyed by a bomb. An intruder, later found to be a government agent, is blown up with it, and Charlie is framed for the deed. Mathilda and Charlie's cats reveal that Jake's parking lot holdings were a front for his real career as a supervillain. Mathilda was his chief assistant, and cats Hera and Persephone are genetically modified super-intelligent spy cats, who had long kept watch on Charlie for Jake. Jake's enemies are now Charlie's enemies: the Lombardy Convocation, an organization of rival villains.

Charlie, Mathilda and the cats take refuge on Jake's Caribbean island hideout in Grenada, powered by geothermal energy from an active volcano and guarded by intelligent dolphins. Charlie meets the Lombardy Convocation at the Grand Bellagio Hotel on Lake Como, Italy. He is pressured to join and pay a substantial membership fee or face severe consequences. He calls their bluff, using his experience as a business reporter to unravel their pressure tactics and deduce that they are actually broke. A private meeting with Anton Dobrev, head of the Convocation, ends up with the latter apparently dead, the hotel burned, and Charlie once again framed.

Charlie regroups at the island hideout, which is attacked by Roberto Gratas, the new head of the Convocation. He retaliates by destroying his enemies' spy satellite with a space laser, severing their communications with a pod of genetically enhanced whales used to attack the island. An apparent accommodation is reached: Charlie agrees to hand over Nazi war plunder stored by Jake in exchange for peace. Gratas betrays his associates and kills them. However, the cache is discovered to be empty, and Gratas's retaliatory efforts against Charlie's staff are foiled. Charlie's dolphins, having pledged allegiance to him after settling a strike on terms favorable to them, suborn the enemy whales. Gratas attempts to kill Charlie but is taken out by the dolphins.

Charlie learns he was a stalking horse in a plot by Jake, Mathilda, and Dobrev (who is not dead after all) to dismantle the Convocation. He concludes that he is unsuited for a life of villainy. As part of his exit, Charlie is exonerated, awarded a safe house previously owned by his cats, inherits several million dollars from his uncle's estate, gains ownership of the tavern, and is reunited with his cats, who also retire from the supervillain business.

== Reception ==
Terrence Miltner in Booklist notes that the author "again" (as in The Kaiju Preservation Society) "examines tropes in a tale of an ordinary individual being cast into an extraordinary situation with his trademark quick pacing, clever banter, and ability to find humor in desperate situations." He concludes that "[w]ith a ... clever premise, Scalzi's latest will appeal to his legion of fans and draw in new ones.

Publishers Weekly calls the book a " clever, fast-paced thriller" that subverts classic supervillain tropes with equal measures of tongue-in-cheek humor and common sense. ... Scalzi balances all the doublecrosses and assassination attempts with ethical quandaries, explorations of economic inequality, and humor ... The result is a breezy and highly entertaining genre send-up."

Marlene Harris, in a double-starred "Pick of the Month" review in Library Journal, calls the novel a "story of snark with a heart [that] reminds readers that the logical conclusion of 'dogs have owners, cats have staff' is that cats are management and never let anyone forget it." She characterizes the book as "[c]ombining the sarcastic humor of Scalzi's Redshirts with an origin story for James Bond–like supervillains operating with the competence-porn-level efficiency and work ethic of Hench by Natalie Zina Walschots." She concludes that "[r]eaders of humorous fantasy are sure to love Scalzi’s latest (after The Kaiju Preservation Society) as much as those cats; it’s also for those who enjoy seeing superhero stories folded, twisted, and mutilated and anyone wishing for a righteous villain lair surrounded by intelligent sharks [sic: dolphins]. Highly recommended."

Kirkus Reviews calls the book "one of many available stories about a good-hearted Everyman thrust into fantastical circumstances, struggling to survive as a fish out of water, and, while well executed for its type, the plot doesn't go anywhere that will surprise you." It "serves as a follow-up of sorts to Scalzi's The Kaiju Preservation Society (2022) in that both are riffs on genre film tropes. The current work is fluffier and sillier than the previous novel and, indeed, many of Scalzi's other books, although there is the occasional jab about governments being in bed with unscrupulous corporate enterprises or the ways in which people can profit from human suffering." The reviewer concludes the novel is "[f]un while it lasts but not one of Scalzi's stronger books."

Year	Award	Category	Result	Ref.
2024	Dragon Award	Science Fiction Novel	Won	
2024	Hugo Award	Novel	Finalist	
2024	Locus Award	Science Fiction Novel	Finalist	

== Adaptation ==
In 2024 it was announced that Ryan Reynolds' Maximum Effort Productions was adapting the novel as a film.
