= Exiles of Embermark =

- Developer: Gunslinger Studios
- Publisher: Wargaming Mobile
- Director: Tim Harris
- Designer: Kyle Marks
- Programmer: Mike Dekoekkoek
- Artists: Mitch Miller, Prashant Patil, Sarah Chiappetta
- Writer: John Scalzi
- Composer: Steve Slivka
- Engine: Unreal Engine
- Platforms: iOS, Android
- Genre: Role-playing
- Modes: Single-player, multiplayer

Exiles of Embermark (abbreviated EoE) is an upcoming fantasy role-playing video game. Described as being a PVP RPG tailored for one-handed mobile play, Exiles is primarily developed by Tim Harris as creative director, Mike Dekoekkoek as lead technical designer, and Kyle Marks as designer.

== Gameplay ==
Exiles of Embermark will have PvP combat, character customization, crafting, Houses (for cooperative play) a game world with PvE battles, live events and spectator mode for viewing and eSports. The game and narrative will be constantly updated with events, quests and content that is generated from the performance of the player base. Viewership from spectator mode will be within the game as well as on streaming sites and applications. As of April 2016, the game's features are still under development and may change.

The main focus of the game is developing a character by honing their skills and abilities, and utilizing various weapons and gear. It is playable in portrait and only requires one thumb to play, without any unnecessary stretching across the screen or needing to use another finger. According to Touch Arcade, "basically, a 'perfect' mobile game that can be whipped out at any time and enjoyed. To that end, even though their goal is real-time multiplayer battles that last less than a minute, they want every action you perform in Exiles of Embermark to be meaningful and work towards your character's development in some way, whether you're playing a short session or a long one." Over time, the player Characters will build up a camp and recruit followers (NPCs) that quest for loot, improve the Character and acquire useful information even when the player is not actively playing.

Organized competitive play will include daily and weekly standing events where Characters compete against computer-controlled enemies for rewards as well as scheduled multiplayer events and leagues for higher levels of competition. Players will organize themselves into teams within their Houses as well as in league play to compete for collective rewards.

== Development ==
The existence of Exiles of Embermark was publicly announced on February 3, 2016, by Pasadena, California-based developer Gunslinger Studios. It is the first of a series of battle RPG games, each of which will expand on the competitive gameplay of Exiles.

Exiles is a Season-based game, and with each Season comes a story arc that is determined by a combination of events designed by the Gunslinger team and the ongoing performance of the players. As the game progresses, players will drive the narrative forward together with the Quests they choose to undertake, the Battles they win and lose, and how they contribute to their Houses.

Many elements within the game will be partially crowdsourced, and community members will have a chance to contribute to everything from the design of items to character abilities to zones of the gameworld itself. Players will have the opportunity to increase their community Rank (separate from PvP Rank), which will get them exclusive benefits in the game when it launches, and, on top of that, their collective voice in whatever House they choose will help shape the game.
