= Monsters of Ohio =

2026 novel by John Scalzi

- first edition
- Author: John Scalzi
- Language: English
- Genre: Science fiction
- Publisher: Tor Books
- Publication date: 3 November 2026
- Publication place: United States
- Media type: Print (hardcover), ebook, audiobook
- Pages: 272
- ISBN: 978-0-7653-8903-9

Monsters of Ohio is a science fiction novel written by American author John Scalzi. It was published in hardcover and ebook by Tor Books, and audiobook by Audible Studios, on November 3, 2026.

== Plot summary ==
Mike Boyd, laid off from his job at the USDA, returns to his old home town of Richland, Ohio for a fresh start. He finds it in decline, with its last major employer, Bradson Foods, planning to shut down the local meat processing plant while simultaneously trying to promote itself with a "Monster Mash" festival. Meanwhile, strange and horrifying events are taking place; the neighbors' cow explodes, followed by the neighbors themselves, resulting in all of them transforming into monsters. The same happens to others, including Mike's discontented father Harve and stepmother Barb. (Oddly, the experience improves their relationship.) Mike joins forces with old friend Dave Price, now a town police officer, and festival organizer Andi Saunders to investigate the mystery.

== Reception ==
In a starred pre-publication review, Kirkus Reviews asks "Can the author of a novel in which the moon turned into cheese (When the Moon Hits Your Eye, 2025) go even wackier in a subsequent work? The answer is an explosive yes." It characterizes the book as "a fresh and splattery spin on the usual Scalzi formula: a sharp commentary on contemporary sociopolitics and corporate greed... Trenchant, funny, grotesque, and improbably sweet."

Publishers Weekly writes "unleashes humorous hell on a cozy Midwestern setting in this fun fantasy that doubles as a tirade on private equity and public spectacle... With Scalzi's dry wit on full display throughout, readers will have a blast dropping into Richland to mash with its monsters."

Library Journal, in a starred review, concludes "Scalzi's delightfully quirky, cozy sci-fi horror serves up a heaping helping of small-town charm, offers a love letter to the author’s own rural Ohio small town, and pays homage to the pulp horror of classic scary movies while snarkily commenting that humans are the scariest monsters of all."
