= The Collapsing Empire =

2017 science fiction novel by John Scalzi

- Cover art for hardcover
- Author: John Scalzi
- Cover artist: Nicolas "Sparth" Bouvier
- Language: English
- Series: The Interdependency series
- Genre: Science fiction (space opera)
- Publisher: Tor Books
- Publication date: March 21, 2017
- Publication place: United States of America
- Pages: 336
- ISBN: 978-0-7653-8888-9
- Followed by: The Consuming Fire

The Collapsing Empire is a space opera novel by American writer John Scalzi. The book was published by Tor Books on March 21, 2017. It is the first book in The Interdependency series (currently a trilogy), although it was originally intended to be a two book series. The second book, The Consuming Fire, was released October 16, 2018 and the final book, The Last Emperox, was released on April 14, 2020.

== Plot ==
The Interdependency is a thousand-year-old human empire of 48 star systems connected by the Flow, a network of "streams" allowing faster-than-light travel. Each stream is one way and has an entry point and an exit point. There is no faster-than-light communication faster than the Flow, and interstellar trips are not instantaneous—ships carrying mail or passengers from Hub, the capital of the empire and the system with the most Flow connections, arrive at End, the most distant, nine months later—but the network permits life-sustaining intersystem trade. As a natural phenomenon, the Flow is poorly understood; Earth disconnected from the network thousands of years ago, and civilization on another system collapsed more recently when its pathway suddenly closed.

Family-owned megacorporations control all interstellar trade in the Interdependency's mercantile economy; one, House Wu, is the royal family. The trading houses are incredibly wealthy from government-sanctioned monopolies and by collecting tolls at "shoals", entrances and exits to Flow pathways. The state religion, with the Emperox as titular head, celebrates the Interdependency as a divinely sanctioned society.

Count Claremont, a physicist on End, calculates after decades of study that the Flow will soon collapse. All systems will be isolated; none are self-sufficient. Humans can only live on a planetary surface on End; they need space stations or underground habitats in other systems. Without the Flow, society on every system will likely collapse. The count sends his son Marce, also a physicist, to Hub to warn his old friend Emperox Attavio VI. The Emperox has died, however, and his unprepared daughter Cardenia is crowned as Grayland II.

House Nohamapetan wants to marry an heir to Cardenia to gain power. It believes that the Flow will change but not collapse, with End becoming the new center of the network. The house covertly supports rebels on End to overthrow its duke, hoping to take power and become the new royal family when the Flow network reshapes. Thousands of imperial troops are sent to End after terrorist bombings on Hub, allegedly caused by End conspirators but actually by the house.

Marce's ship is the last to leave End before its Flow entrance shoal closes; the system's exit shoal will be the last to close. Although Nohamapetan's plan to assassinate Cardenia is exposed, its family member on End frames Count Claremont for murdering the Duke of End and becomes the new Duke. The novel ends with Marce and Cardenia believing that they need to warn every system of the collapse and the need to evacuate people to End. Other nobles and bureaucrats are skeptical of their civilization's coming collapse, and Nohamapetan controls the Flow exit and imperial troops at End.

== Reception ==
The Ars Technica reviewer enjoyed Scalzi's space opera and summarized the story as a "thought experiment about the fall of civilization."

As of 2017, the TV rights to The Collapsing Empire have been purchased by Working Title Television.

== Awards ==
Year	Award	Category	Result	Ref.
2017	Dragon Award	Science Fiction Novel	Nominated	
2017	Goodreads Choice Awards	Science Fiction	Finalist	
2018	Locus Award	Science Fiction Novel	Won	
2018	Hugo Award	Novel	Finalist	
