= Fuzzy Nation =

2011 novel by John Scalzi

- First edition
- Author: John Scalzi
- Language: English
- Genre: Science fiction
- Publisher: Tor Books
- Publication date: May 2011
- Publication place: United States
- Media type: Print (paperback)
- Pages: 368
- ISBN: 978-0765367037

Fuzzy Nation (ISBN 0765367033, published by Tor Books) is a 2011 novel by John Scalzi, described as a reboot of H. Beam Piper's 1962 novel Little Fuzzy.

In 2012, Scalzi's novel received the Audie Award for Science Fiction and it was narrated by Wil Wheaton.

== Origins ==
Scalzi's novel, authorized by the estate of H. Beam Piper, was not intended to be a sequel to Little Fuzzy, unlike the books Fuzzy Bones by William Tuning and Golden Dream: A Fuzzy Odyssey by Ardath Mayhar. It was originally written as an exercise following negotiations regarding another Scalzi novel and, when completed, Scalzi's agent approached the Piper estate for permission to publish the novel. It uses the original plot and characters to tell an original story in a different continuity. Scalzi, a fan of Piper's work, said that he aimed to make the story approachable to readers unfamiliar with the original while directing fans to Piper's books.

== Plot summary ==
On the human colony planet Zara XXIII, Jack Holloway is a rebellious former lawyer working as a contract surveyor for the firm Zaracorp. He is fired for causing environmental damage after letting his dog set off explosives (again). However, the explosion uncovers a massive trove of tremendously valuable sunstones. Holloway persuade the Zaracorp manager that the sunstones are now by rights his; the manager agrees to a rider to his contract to grant him a greater share of the spoils. Shortly thereafter, Holloway meets a family of clever, cat-like creatures which he dubs the fuzzys. The family of fuzzys moves into his home. Holloway calls his ex-girlfriend Isabel Wangai, Zaracorp's biologist, to meet them.

Isabel comes to believe the fuzzys are a sapient species. If confirmed by a Colonial Authority judge, this would require Zaracorp to leave the planet and cede its natural resources. Zaracorp executives attempt to bribe Holloway to testify against Isabel's theory. Holloway eventually comes to agree that the fuzzys are sapient after realizing that they speak their own sophisticated language at a pitch too high for humans to hear, and argues strongly for the species in court. This makes the fuzzys a target by surveyors and Zaracorp employees seeking to protect their financial interests; two of the fuzzy family are killed by a Zaracorp guard.

The fuzzys then reveal to Holloway that they are able to speak audible English, which they learned from a literacy program on a tablet lost by a surveyor years earlier. In the court proceedings that ensue, a fuzzy testifies to the murders of his children. Holloway also embarrasses Zaracorp by persuading his line manager to testify that Holloway's contract was never reactivated after the rider was approved, giving Holloway outright control of the sunstone seam he found. Zaracorp loses its exploration and extraction license for trying to deceive the judge. Holloway, Isabel, the line manager, and other helpers become the human guardians of the fuzzys.

== Reviews ==
The novel received positive reviews from Publishers Weekly and Kirkus Reviews. Kirkus Reviews said that while a literary reboot of the original may be, strictly speaking, unnecessary, Scalzi's novel adds depth and poignancy to the original story.
