= Just a Geek =

Book by Wil Wheaton

Just a Geek: Unflinchingly Honest Tales of the Search for Life, Love, and Fulfillment Beyond the Starship Enterprise
- Author: Wil Wheaton
- Genre: Memoir
- Publication date: 2004
- ISBN: 059600768X

Just a Geek: Unflinchingly Honest Tales of the Search for Life, Love, and Fulfillment Beyond the Starship Enterprise (ISBN 059600768X) is a 2004 book of memoirs written by actor and author Wil Wheaton. Wheaton released a revised follow-up, Still Just a Geek, in 2022.

== Background ==
Many of the stories in Just a Geek originate from Wheaton's blog, also called "Just a Geek", which had run for several years at the time. In the book, he talks about life before and after his defining role as Wesley Crusher on Star Trek: The Next Generation, including stories about clashes with executives and a disagreement with Jimmy Kimmel over a co-hosting job he did not receive. Other stories discuss his reaction to the September 11 attacks, his relationship with his wife and stepchildren, and his experience learning HTML, web design, and Linux.

In 2012, the book was included as part of the first Humble Bundle collection of ebooks, curated by Cory Doctorow.

In 2022's Still Just a Geek, Wheaton annotates the original text with commentary related to his gaining further context, growing as an individual, and how he views the process of writing the book and his life experiences in retrospect.

== Critical reception ==
Just a Geek was praised by the science fiction/fantasy trade publication Chronicle for its "amused but not bitter" anecdotes. The Oregonian called it "unflinchingly honest." Entertainment Weekly, however panned the book in a brief blurb titled "Whiner of the Week." The updated follow-up published in 2022 was called "alternately rueful and funny" by Kirkus Reviews. Publishers Weekly gave it a more negative review, calling it "repetitious" and "joyless".
