= Agent to the Stars =

2005 novel by John Scalzi

- Cover of trade paperback
- Author: John Scalzi
- Illustrator: Pascal Blanchet
- Cover artist: Irene Gallo
- Language: English
- Genre: Science fiction
- Published: August 2005 Subterranean Press
- Media type: Print (paperback)
- Pages: 286
- ISBN: 978-1596060203

Agent to the Stars is a science fiction novel by American writer John Scalzi. It tells the story of Tom Stein, a young Hollywood agent who is hired by an alien race to handle the revelation of their presence to humanity.

== Plot ==
Tom Stein is a celebrity agent, representing a handful of Hollywood actors, the most famous of which is Michelle Beck, an earnest but brainless blonde who wants to break into serious acting despite having very limited talent. Carl Lupo, Tom's boss, tells him to drop all his clients in order to take on Joshua. Joshua, as it turns out, is a Yherajk, an amorphous ameboid species that communicate through olfactory transmission, and smell horrifically awful, that have traveled to Earth in an asteroid to make first contact. Realizing they fit the Hollywood movie description of an alien monster, the aliens contacted Carl surreptitiously and created Joshua through an amalgam of Yherajk and Carl's thoughts.

Joshua hides at Tom's house, and fuses with Ralph, an elderly dog that Tom had been caring for, after Ralph suffered a heart attack. In order to give Joshua something to do, he begins hiring Joshua the dog out for roles, and he instantly becomes the most wanted canine actor in Hollywood, given his apparent abilities.

Later, after a disastrous reading for a part in a Holocaust drama movie, Michelle is accidentally smothered while making a special effect mask for a sci-fi movie. Realizing that the Yherajk could heal her by bonding, similar to how Joshua bonded with Ralph the dog, he conspires to take her to the ship. This causes an uproar, as bonding with a sentient member of a species is the most atrocious act among the Yherjak, and also that Michelle committed suicide. Upon further inspection, and learning that Michelle had suffocated by accident, the Yherajk agree and Michelle reemerges, now a mental amalgam of Miranda, Michelle and Joshua—who himself was an amalgam of two-thousand Yherajk, Carl and Ralph the dog.

Tom pushes forward with the idea of casting Michelle in the Holocaust film Hard Memories. After meeting Tom's grandmother Sarah Rosenthal, a Holocaust survivor, Michelle absorbs her memories and delivers a blistering audition. The movie is an unparalleled success, and Michelle wins an Academy Award for Best Actress. During her acceptance speech, she gradually asserts her normal, clear gelatinous shape, while making a call for acceptance regardless of appearance or form. The Yherajk, revealed at last, are widely accepted.

== Publication history ==
Scalzi started Agent to the Stars in 1997 as his "practice" novel, to see if he could write a novel. He published it as a shareware novel on his website Whatever in 1999, requesting that readers send him $1 if they liked the story. After five years, during which he reports he made about $4,000, he stopped asking for further donations.

After the official printed release of Scalzi's second book, Old Man's War, by Tor Books in 2005, a limited edition of Agent to the Stars was published in 2005 by Subterranean Press, with a cover by Mike Krahulik of Penny Arcade fame. Tor later released a trade paperback edition in November 2008, and a mass market edition in December 2010. An audiobook version narrated by Wil Wheaton was released on December 7, 2010.

== Reception ==
Publishers Weekly considered it to be "slick" and "lightweight", with a "predictable plot" that was nonetheless "entertaining". Amazing Stories described it as "disposable, cynical fun with a big heart" and "rather low-key for a first contact story", with a "knowingly silly set-up", "reasonably sharp" characters and dialogue, and a realistic-feeling portrayal of life in a talent agency. The SF Site compared it to the work of Spider Robinson and Robert Heinlein, calling it "(t)hought-provoking and entertaining", and praising Scalzi for exploring the human tendency to couple morality with esthetics.
