= The Consuming Fire =

Science fiction novel by John Scalzi

- Author: John Scalzi
- Cover artist: Nicolas "Sparth" Bouvier
- Language: English
- Series: The Interdependency series
- Genre: Science fiction (space opera)
- Publisher: Tor Books
- Publication date: October 16, 2018
- Publication place: United States of America
- Pages: 320
- ISBN: 978-0-7653-8897-1
- Preceded by: The Collapsing Empire
- Followed by: The Last Emperox

The Consuming Fire is a space opera novel by American writer John Scalzi. The book was published by Tor Books on October 16, 2018. Audible released an audio book version narrated by Wil Wheaton. It is the middle volume of The Interdependency trilogy and a sequel to The Collapsing Empire; the third and final book, The Last Emperox, was published on 14 April 2020. The Consuming Fire reached #15 on The New York Times bestseller list for combined print and e-book fiction.

== Plot ==
Following the events of The Collapsing Empire, End is now isolated from Hub as the result of a Flow shoal breakdown. Seeking to unite the population of the Interdependency behind an agenda to get ahead of the coming collapse of Flow-supported space travel, Grayland II (Cardenia Wu-Patrick) claims, in her capacity as head of the Church of the Interdependency, to have had visions affirming the need to plan for the collapse. This causes religious disquiet in the church, and political intrigue from the House of Nohamapetan and the House of Wu with the aim of claiming the throne from Grayland II through a coup d'etat. Meanwhile, Marce Claremont follows a lead provided by his erstwhile rival, the researcher Hatide Roynold, and together they learn that the Interdependency will once again be connected by Flow shoals in a different configuration on a timescale of hundreds of years, and that in the meantime evanescent shoals will appear and disappear. Seeking to learn more about the possibility of survival while cut off from other parts of the Interdependency, Marce and Hatide, accompanied by Marines, depart to study the survival of life on Dalasýsla, a system which was cut off for eight hundred years until the emergence of an evanescent Flow shoal.

Kiva Lagos, meanwhile, deals with the aftermath of Nadashe Nohamapetan's actions. Tasked by Grayland II with the upkeep of the House of Nohamapetan's business affairs on Hub, Kiva becomes a hindrance to the Countess's plans for regaining wealth and political favour. When Grayland II shoots down the Countess's plans to regain control of her House, the Countess retaliates at Kiva with an attempt on her life. Kiva survives but her lover Senia, lawyer for the Nohamapetan house, is seriously injured. In response, Kiva assaults the Countess's chief of staff. Nadashe is covertly sprung from imprisonment through the efforts of the Nohamapetan and Wu conspirators, who stage the incident as a failed escape attempt with no survivors. Kiva, investigating the House of Nohamapetan's affairs, discovers clues pointing to Nadashe being alive.

Marce and Hatide, while visiting Dalasýsla, meet survivors who have adapted to the changed conditions over hundreds of years. Coming under attack from Nohamapetan-hired mercenaries, Marce and a few members of his expedition manage to survive while the ship carrying Hatide and the rest of the expedition is destroyed. Marce returns to Hub with the help of Tomas Chenevert, a deposed king from outside the Interdependency who has had his consciousness transferred to a ship after his death. They return in time to witness Grayland II decide on a course of action in response to the anticipated coup d'etat attempt. Learning the identities of the traitors, she invites them to a party and proceeds to honour and promote her allies, Kiva and the Archbishop of the Church, and denounce and arrest the rest. The book ends with Marce offering a solution to the problem of getting the Hub population to End without coming under attack from Ghreni Nohamapetan and his allies, who strategically positioned themselves to control the passage to End in earlier events.

== Reception ==
Its reviews were largely positive and said that "sits perfectly in its second-book role, leaving the reader deeply invested in the developing story, with plenty left to tell" but that it "falls into a tired mode" part way through before the storytelling "brights" again. Reviewers also praised the world-building, outcomes of the villains, successful set up of its sequel, pace of writing, and humor.
