= The Shadow War of the Night Dragons =

"Cover art" for the nonexistent novel of which the story was allegedly an excerpt.

"The Shadow War of the Night Dragons, Book One: The Dead City" is a parody fantasy short story by John Scalzi. It was first published on Tor.com on April 1, 2011, and presented as an excerpt from a nonexistent larger work.

== Synopsis ==
On a dark and stormy night, three palace guards in the city of Skalandarharia discuss the possible existence of Night Dragons.

== Reception ==
"The Shadow War of the Night Dragons" was a finalist for the 2012 Hugo Award for Best Short Story.

GamesRadar considered that the story "affectionately skewers the heroic fantasy genre". At Escape Pod, Mur Lafferty commended it as "very funny".

Jim C. Hines praised Tor for supporting the joke by commissioning cover art for the non-existent novel, and noted that there was "an actual story (...) amidst the jokes and the over-the-top fantasy tropes", such that "when (he) finished reading, (he) wanted to know what happened next;" Hines did, however, note that "some of the humor felt a little forced", and correctly predicted that the story would not win the Hugo.
