= A Very Scalzi Christmas =

2019 short story collection by John Scalzi

- Book cover by Natalie Metzger
- Author: John Scalzi
- Audio read by: Full cast
- Cover artist: Natalie Metzger
- Language: English
- Publisher: Subterranean Press
- Publication date: November 2019
- Publication place: United States
- Pages: 144
- ISBN: 978-1-59606-932-9

A Very Scalzi Christmas is a Christmas holiday-themed short story collection by John Scalzi published in November 2019.

== Contents ==
- Ho Ho Intro, or, the Reason for the Season
- Science Fictional Thanksgiving Grace
- A Bitter November
- The 10 Least Successful Holiday Specials of All Time
- An Interview with Santa's Lawyer
- A Personal Top 10 of Things That Are Not Titles to Christmas Songs and/or Lifetime Holiday Movies and Honestly I Don't Understand Why
- Christmas in July
- Interview with Santa's Reindeer Wrangler
- 8 Things You Didn't Know You Didn't Know About Your Favorite Holiday Music
- Jackie Jones and Melrose Mandy
- An Interview with the Christmas Bunny
- Jangle the Elf Grants Wishes
- Script Notes on the Birth of Jesus
- Sarah's Sister
- An Interview with the Nativity Innkeeper
- Resolutions for the New Year: A Bullet Point List

== Reception ==
At Locus Magazine, Carolyn Cushman suggested that the collection might become a "holiday standard". Publishers Weekly claimed that Scalzi fans would find something there that appealed, no matter their feelings for the holiday, while Kirkus Reviews described the stories as "pleasant and often chuckleworthy". And Tadiana Jones wrote on Fantasy Literature that the collection was an amusing way to while away an hour or two with Christmas-flavored works.
