= When the Yogurt Took Over =

- Love, Death & Robots episode
- Episode no.: Season 1 Episode 6
- Directed by: Victor Maldonado; Alfredo Torres
- Written by: Janis Robertson
- Based on: "When the Yogurt Took Over" by John Scalzi
- Editing by: Stacy Ouckland
- Original air date: 15 March 2019
- Running time: 6 minutes

Cast
- Maurice LaMarche as Narrator; Alexia Dox as Protesting Hippie/Ohio Mom

Episode chronology
← Previous "Sucker of Souls"	Next → "Beyond the Aquila Rift"

"When the Yogurt Took Over" is the sixth episode of the first volume of the adult animated anthology series Love, Death & Robots. It was directed by Víctor Maldonado and Alfredo Torres from a screenplay written by Janis Robertson, which was based on the short story of the same name by John Scalzi about a yogurt that tries to solve humanity's problems. It was animated by Blow Studio.

== Plot ==
A group of scientists mutates a yogurt by fermenting bacteria. Although initial tests fail, the dairy product gains sentience and superintelligence. The yogurt meets with American leaders, claiming to have solutions to the country's problems. As payment, the yogurt requests control of the state of Ohio. The leaders agree, preventing the yogurt from going to China. Soon, the yogurt gives the president a plan to eradicate the national debt and tells him to follow it exactly. The President fails to do so, thus the global economy collapses, except in Ohio. The American government grants the yogurt supreme executive power over much opposition. A decade later, humans are living prosperous lives under the reign of the yogurt. The yogurt begins initiating space launches, leaving humanity fearful that the yogurt may venture into space and leave them behind forever.

== Reception ==
=== Critical reception ===
Laura Prudom of IGN Africa singled out "When the Yogurt Took Over" as a concise comedic short that demonstrates the flexibility of the format. David Fear of Rolling Stone called the short a wonderful comedy episode. Reuben Baron by CBR gave it a B+, highlighting its use of absurdity to deliver a pointed, concise, and gleefully silly social critique. Brandon Katz noted Observer that the intentionally ridiculous way the story is told makes it a touching and absurdly funny work. Ben Travers of IndieWire named the episode a highlight of Volume 1 due to its charming tone, concept, and style. Micah Peters of The Ringer also praised it, calling it strange, funny, and charming, which then turns somewhat disheartening.

In a negative review, Allie O'Connor of The Vermont Cynic called it a "meh episode", saying that its style of humor would not have worked with a longer runtime.

=== Top volume lists ===
- 2nd — TV Guide (Tim Surette)
- 3rd — Screen Rant (Anthony McGlynn)
- 4th — Taste of Cinema (Zach Wee)
- 6th — Collider (Dave Trumbore)
- 10th — Vulture (Scott Meslow)
