= Lock In =

Novel by John Scalzi

- Cover of hardcover
- Author: John Scalzi
- Cover artist: Peter Lutjen
- Language: English
- Genre: Science fiction, police procedural
- Publisher: Tor Books
- Publication date: August 26, 2014
- Publication place: United States of America
- Pages: 336
- ISBN: 978-0-7653-7586-5
- Followed by: Head On

Lock In is a science fiction police procedural novel by American writer John Scalzi. The book was published by Tor Books on August 26, 2014. The audiobook of the novel was released in two versions, one narrated by Wil Wheaton and the other by Amber Benson.

The sequel to this novel is titled Head On, which was released in April 2018.

== Plot summary ==
The world is exposed to a highly contagious virus. Most who get sick experience nothing worse than flu-like symptoms. For 1%, the virus causes the victims to be fully awake, but unable to move or respond to stimulus. This is known as "lock in", and resembles the real condition known as locked-in syndrome. The illness comes to be known as "Haden's syndrome" with its victims called "Hadens". Humanoid robotic personal transport units controlled by a Haden's brain (nicknamed "Threeps" after C-3PO from Star Wars) are developed as the primary way for a Haden to interact with the outside world.

Twenty five years after the initial virus exposure, FBI agents Chris Shane (who is a Haden) and Leslie Vann are assigned to a Haden-related murder, with a suspect who is an "Integrator" – someone who can let a Haden use their bodies. If the Integrator was carrying a Haden, then finding the suspect for the murder is complicated. Further Integrator-Haden related murders occur, making the case larger than expected, and as Shane and Vann dig deeper, they uncover a plot to completely shake up the Haden economy.

== Companion novella ==
Lock In is accompanied by a novella, Unlocked: An Oral History of Haden's Syndrome, an epistolary work which provides background details about the origins of the epidemic. Chris Shane, the protagonist of Lock In, is briefly mentioned in Unlocked.

== Reception ==
The Milwaukee Journal Sentinel called it "compulsively readable", and praised Scalzi for having "a combination of skill, vision and intuition."

Legendary Television acquired the rights to Lock In to adapt it into a TV pilot in 2014. However, sometime before March 2017 the TV rights were given up by Legendary.

Year	Award	Category	Result	Ref.
2015	Campbell Memorial Award	—	Finalist	
2015	Locus Award	Science Fiction Novel	Finalist	

An analysis at io9 suggested that, if not for the Sad Puppies ballot-manipulation campaign, Lock In would have been a finalist for the 2015 Hugo Award for Best Novel.
