= The Dispatcher =

2016 novella by John Scalzi

- Author: John Scalzi
- Language: English
- Genre: Science fiction novella
- Publication place: United States

The Dispatcher is a 2016 science fiction novella by John Scalzi. It was originally published as an audiobook from Audible, read by Zachary Quinto.

== Synopsis ==
In the wake of an unexplained phenomenon worldwide — when people are deliberately killed, they almost always disappear from their site of death and reappear, reset to several hours earlier, in a safe place — the profession of "Dispatcher" evolves. Dispatchers euthanize mortally-injured people before their natural deaths, enabling them to reset. Tony Valdez is a Dispatcher recruited by the police to assist in investigating the disappearance of another Dispatcher.

== Reception ==
National Public Radio considered the book "thin" and "a little bit rushed (because, you know, novella)", but praised Scalzi's "fertile and weird imagination", and noted that "the most interesting ideas come as asides, hints, hypotheticals".

Kirkus Reviews observed that "[t]here are, frustratingly, no answers" provided to the question of why the resurrections began, and noted that, due to its origins as an audiobook, the novella is "dialogue-heavy and descriptive-light", with the "sense of Valdez’s character and voice" that was provided by Quinto's performance, not being present in the text.

== Sequels ==
The Dispatcher was followed in 2020 by Murder By Other Means and in 2022 by Travel By Bullet. Like the original, the sequels follow Dispatcher Tony Valdez and were initially released exclusively on Audible, both still narrated by Zachary Quinto.

== Adaptation ==
In 2021, Deadline Hollywood announced that a television adaptation of The Dispatcher was being planned, with Uri Singer as producer.
