= Head On (novel) =

2018 novel by John Scalzi

- Cover of hardcover
- Author: John Scalzi
- Language: English
- Genre: Science fiction, police procedural
- Publisher: Tor Books
- Publication date: April 17, 2018
- Publication place: United States
- Pages: 335
- ISBN: 978-0-765-38891-9
- Preceded by: Lock In

Head On is a science fiction police procedural novel by American writer John Scalzi. The book was published by Tor Books on April 17, 2018. Audible has released two audiobook editions, each with a different narrator, Amber Benson and Wil Wheaton. It is a standalone sequel to Lock In.

== Plot summary ==
After the events of Lock In, the immobile victims of Haden's Syndrome continued to use robotic bodies called Threeps to interact with the outside world. Hilketa, a sport played by Hadens, is a combination of football and gladiatorial combat where the goal is to decapitate one Threep player chosen randomly throughout the game and get their head through the goalposts. The name of the sport comes from the Basque word for "murder". When a star Hilketa athlete dies during a match, Haden FBI agent Chris Shane and their partner Leslie Vann are sent to find the truth behind the death and uncover dangerous secrets behind Hilketa.

== Reception ==
According to Kirkus Reviews:

All in all, Head On is a worthy successor to Lock In. And, of course, if you like police procedurals, you really can’t go wrong with this second novel. In Book Smugglerish, seven severed threep heads out of ten.
