= Redshirt (stock character) =

Character who is quickly killed off

Captain Kirk (right) and Mr. Spock (left) discover dead redshirts in the Star Trek episode "Obsession" (1967).

In fiction, "redshirt" is an informal term for a stock character who is killed off shortly after being introduced. The term often implies that said character was introduced for the sole purpose of being killed off while adding little else to the story, and is sometimes used pejoratively to point out a redshirt's lack of good characterization or the predictability of the character's death. Redshirt deaths are often used to emphasize the danger the protagonists face.

The term originates from discussion of the 1966–1969 television series Star Trek, in which never-before-seen background characters— generally red-uniformed security officers and engineers—often suffered quick deaths when they went on missions with the protagonists.

== Origin ==
…red-shirted security guards [who] often got torn apart by a monster or dematerialized by a Klingon…

— The New York Times on redshirts, 2006

In the original Star Trek series, red-uniformed security officers and engineers who accompany the main characters on landing parties often suffer quick deaths. The first instance of what now is an established trope can be seen in the 1966 episode "What Are Little Girls Made Of?".

Of the 55 crew members killed in the series, twenty-four were wearing red shirts, compared to fifteen who had unconfirmed shirt colors, nine in gold shirts, and seven in blue shirts.

== Usage ==
A variety of Star Trek works and other media have referenced the trope in various ways.

The Star Trek: Deep Space Nine book Legends of the Ferengi says Starfleet security personnel "rarely survive beyond the second act break". A 1998 episode of Deep Space Nine, "Valiant," also references red as a sort of bad luck omen, in which the plot centers around a group of cadets calling themselves "Red Squad", almost all of whom die in the episode. The 2009 cinematic reboot of the franchise features a character named Olson (portrayed by Greg Ellis) who dies early on during a mission; he wears a red uniform in homage to the trope from the original series. One episode of Star Trek: Lower Decks, a comedy series in the Star Trek franchise, pokes fun at the "redshirt" phenomenon by featuring a club of ambitious junior officers who nickname themselves the "redshirts", since the term does not have the same connotations in the Star Trek universe that it has in the real world.

In other media, the term "redshirt" and images of characters wearing red shirts have come to represent disposable characters destined for suffering or death.

The trope, and its particular usage in Star Trek, has been parodied and deconstructed in other media. Parodies include the 1999 comedy film Galaxy Quest, about actors from a defunct science-fiction television series serving on a real starship, which includes an actor who is terrified that he is going to die because his only appearance in the show was as an unnamed character who was killed early in the episode. The novel Redshirts by John Scalzi satirizes the trope, as does the video game Redshirt.

== See also ==
- Cannon fodder
- Sacrificial lamb
- Spear carrier
