= The God Engines =

2009 novella by John Scalzi

- Cover of first edition (hardcover)
- Author: John Scalzi
- Language: English
- Genre: Science fiction novella
- Publisher: Subterranean Press
- Publication date: 2009
- Publication place: United States
- Media type: Print (Hardback & Paperback)
- Pages: 136
- ISBN: 978-1-59606-299-3

The God Engines is a 2009 science fiction/fantasy novella by John Scalzi.

== Synopsis ==
The story takes place in a universe where space travel is accomplished by chaining intelligent, human-like creatures called gods to a spacecraft and torturing them to drive the ship. The people are ruled by an organization called the Bishopry Militant, who worship a powerful being. Captain Ean Tephe is completely faithful to the Bishopry, but his faith comes under test when he is assigned a secret mission in which his ship's god seems to have a keen interest.

== Reception ==
Publishers Weekly called it "ferociously inventive, painfully vivid, dispassionately bleak and dreadfully memorable", and compared it to a collaboration between J. G. Ballard and H.P. Lovecraft.

Year	Award	Category	Result	Ref.
2009	Nebula Award	Novella	Finalist	
2010	Hugo Award	Novella	Finalist	
