= The Android's Dream =

2006 novel by John Scalzi

- Author: John Scalzi
- Cover artist: Shelley Eshkar
- Language: English
- Genre: Science fiction
- Publisher: Tor Books
- Publication date: October 2006
- Publication place: United States
- Media type: Print (Hardback)
- Pages: 396
- ISBN: 0-7653-0941-6
- OCLC: 65341139
- Dewey Decimal: 813/.6 22
- LC Class: PS3619.C256 A84 2006

The Android's Dream is a 2006 science fiction novel by American writer John Scalzi.

The title is a reference to Philip K. Dick's Do Androids Dream of Electric Sheep?

== Synopsis ==
The story covers the journey of ex-soldier and State Department employee Harry Creek in his work to acquire a sheep of the Android's Dream breed for the coronation ceremony of an alien race known as the Nidu. The Nidu assert that unless a satisfactory sheep can be provided, the political and diplomatic fallout will cause the Nidu to declare war on Earth—a war Earth will lose badly. The genetically designed breed is very rare and believed extinct after a sect of Nidu intent on deposing the government exterminated all known samples, leading Harry on a chase to find one along with assistance from Brian, an AI based on Harry's childhood friend. The only surviving remnant of the Android's Dream turns out to be Robin Baker, a young lady who is the child of an Android's Dream sheep/human hybrid. At the center of the story is the Church of the Evolved Lamb, whose members recognize that its founding was a total scam, but are devoted to making its prophecies come true anyway.

Harry slowly meets and befriends Robin after numerous attempts to capture her (most notably being a daring escape in Arlington Mall). They flee from a group out to kill her to derail the Nidu coronation, and hide on an instellar liner. The Nidu attack the liner to capture Robin, and Harry eventually surrenders on the stipulation that Robin not be harmed before or after the coronation. During this, the Earth government injunct with the Common Confederation courts that Robin Baker is not human, and actually the sole member of her own unique species, and entitled to protection from the CC.

Being forced to participate in the ceremony, Robin sabotages the proceedings by declaring herself the new Nidu leader, and Brian the controller of the Nidu network, effectively turning control of the entire Nidu nation over to Brian. During this, the Church also declares that Robin is the Evolved Lamb, as she has completed a majority of their prophecies, effectively making her a living goddess, a sovereign, and the single richest person on earth over the course of several minutes.

== Reception ==
Publishers Weekly found it to be "an effervescent but intelligent romp", with "inventive jabs at pretend patriotism and self-serving civil service". The SF Site compared it to "prime-period Robert A. Heinlein", lauding it as "pretty near perfect light planetary romance" and "remarkably well-crafted entertainment" (despite "a place or two where Scalzi noodges the plot-logic a little hard").

SF Signal likened it to "an Elmore Leonard [co-written] with Keith Laumer", and praised its "whip-smart writing" and "realistic everyday dialogue", but faulted the pacing and exposition in the first quarter of the book.

Paul Di Filippo similarly noted the influence of Laumer and Leonard, but posited that the book's "ancestors" also included Christopher Anvil, Eric Frank Russell, and Gordon R. Dickson on the science fiction side, and Carl Hiaasen and Donald Westlake on the "caper novel" side. James Nicoll observed that the book "cheerfully embraces the idea that the US is the only country that matters", and called it "American SF intended to appeal to Americans", but nonetheless commended the quality of Scalzi's prose, and emphasized the extent to which "the plot turned on legal minutiae".
