= The Kaiju Preservation Society =

Science fiction novel by John Scalzi

- first edition
- Author: John Scalzi
- Cover artist: Hanna Vedenpää
- Language: English
- Genre: Science fiction
- Publisher: Tor Books
- Publication date: 2022
- Publication place: United States
- Media type: Print (hardcover), ebook, audiobook
- Pages: 272
- ISBN: 978-0-7653-8912-1

The Kaiju Preservation Society is a science fiction novel written by American author John Scalzi. It was first published in hardcover and ebook by Tor Books, and audiobook by Audible Studios, on March 15, 2022; British hardcover and ebook editions were released by Tor UK on March 17, 2022. A large print hardcover edition was issued by Thorndike Press on July 27, 2022, and a trade paperback edition by Tor Books on January 24, 2023.

== Plot summary ==
Jamie Gray goes to a six-month performance review as an employee for food delivery startup füdmüd expecting to impress boss Rob Sanders with plans to grow the company, only to be terminated and offered a delivery contract instead. At first rejecting the offer, Jamie is eventually forced to take it after all to make rent, as jobs are scarce in COVID-19-afflicted New York City. One delivery client turns out to be Tom Stevens, an old acquaintance, and over the next few weeks of deliveries they renew their friendship. Tom has a lucrative position with KPS, a secretive animal rights NGO, and is slated to head out into the field right about the same time Jamie loses the delivery job (füdmüd having been bought out). Tom offers Jamie a job with his own employer, and Jamie, again out of options, goes in for the interview, is accepted, and is soon on a plane to Thule Air Base in Greenland.

Thule Air Base turns out to hide the gateway to a parallel Earth, in which evolution took a different turn after the early Mesozoic era, resulting in a planet dominated by impossibly immense creatures whose growth is fueled by internal bio-nuclear reactors. Mankind first became aware of this world in the wake of World War II, when the use of atomic bombs opened temporary portals between the worlds, to and through which the creatures were attracted by the radiation fallout, on which they feed. After Japanese filmmakers were inspired by rumors of the initial breakthrough to make "Kaiju" movies such as Godzilla and its successors, the creatures were dubbed Kaiju. Aside from such rumors, their real-life existence has been kept secret by governments around the world, who formed KPS (the Kaiju Preservation Society) to study the Kaiju Earth, prevent additional breakthroughs, and protect the denizens of each world from those of the other.

Kaiju Earth is a torrid world, high in oxygen and radioactive volatiles, dominated by Kaiju and teeming with lesser predators. Sent to Tanaka Base, an outpost in the Kaiju Earth version of Labrador, Jamie supports the scientific staff studying the biota there, particularly the Kaiju "Bella," a brooding mother laying her eggs at the irradiated site of the death of another Kaiju, whose internal atomic pile overheated and exploded—a not infrequent occurrence. Unfortunately, this event weakened the barrier between worlds, and Bella planting herself at the very location the event occurred is keeping the barrier from rehealing. A predatory corporation on the Human Earth side (coincidentally led by Jamie's old boss Rob Sanders), in on the Kaiju secret, takes the opportunity to breach the barrier and move the Kaiju mother and her eggs to the Human side. Jamie and the other KPS team members must somehow cross over themselves and recover Bella, both to preserve the Kaiju secret and protect both worlds from catastrophe.

== Reception ==
Booklist characterized the novel as "a wonderfully inventive take on the kaiju theme, ... ow[ing] a substantial debt to the Japanese kaiju film genre, and to Pacific Rim and Jurassic Park," and noted that Scalzi "gleefully acknowledges [that] debt with references scattered through the book." Kirkus Reviews calls the book an "unusual pandemic novel," which "despite the absurdity of the premise (...) isn't entirely escapist fluff", specifying that although it has "the banter and snarky humor [that] readers expect from [Scalzi]", it is also "a blunt and savage swipe at tech-bro/billionaire culture, the Trump administration, and the chaos and tragedy that result when powerful and rich people set themselves against science and scientists in order to profit from disaster."

In a starred review, Publishers Weekly calls the novel a "wonderfully witty and refreshingly earnest adventure yarn" in which "[a] more ethical Jurassic Park meets the camaraderie of Parks and Recreation," a "hyper-current story ... touching on the Covid-19 pandemic and offering exactly the kind of playfulness and hope that were needed during that period (and are still more than welcome now)." It concludes "The parallel world Scalzi builds is understandably dangerous even as he carries on the science fiction tradition of questioning who the real monsters are, but those realistically dark elements help highlight the more optimistic themes of collective action and preservation. The resulting escape is equally lighthearted and grounded—and sure to delight." Kristi Chadwick in Library Journal writes "Scalzi's ... prose is action- and humor-driven and includes just the right amount of the current climate to anchor the setting without wallowing in it," noting that his "first stand-alone novel in several years is a wild ride filled with takes on pop culture, startups, governmental influence, and science." Adam Morgan in Scientific American writes "John Scalzi's stand-alone adventure novel is a fun throwback to Michael Crichton's 1990s sci-fi thrillers. ... Scalzi describes the book as a 'pop song,' and he's right—there are no cerebral messages about animal rights or nuclear proliferation. Written with the brisk pace of a screenplay, it's as quippy as a Marvel movie and as awe-inspiring as Jurassic Park."

Lisa Tuttle in The Guardian calls the book "Hugely enjoyable, intelligent and good-humoured fun." Tom Shippey in The Wall Street Journal rates the novel as "[a] great romp all the way through." Brandon Crilly at blackgate.com describes the novel as "a remarkably fun book" and "exactly the book I needed for late December 2022." Noting how Scalzi "works a narrative through pointed dialogue and non-stop pacing," he writes that "[a]nyone with an understanding of bureaucracy, activism, kaiju, and dealing with horrible rich people will probably adore this story." The novel was also reviewed in Shoreline of Infinity for June 2022.

== Awards ==
Year	Award	Category	Result	Ref.
2022	Dragon Award	Science Fiction Novel	Nominated	
2022	Goodreads Choice Awards	Science Fiction	Finalist	
2023	Alex Award	—	Won	
2023	Hugo Award	Novel	Finalist	
2023	Locus Award	Science Fiction Novel	Won	
2024	Seiun Award	Translated Novel	Won	
