= Redshirts (novel) =

2012 sci-fi satire by John Scalzi

- Author: John Scalzi
- Language: English
- Genre: Comic science fiction
- Publisher: Tor Books
- Publication date: June 5, 2012
- Publication place: United States of America
- Pages: 317
- Awards: Hugo Award for Best Novel (2013); Locus Award for Best Science Fiction Novel (2013)
- ISBN: 978-0-7653-1699-8

Redshirts (originally titled Redshirts: A Novel with Three Codas) is a postmodernist science fiction novel by John Scalzi that satirizes the tropes and narrative elements of Star Trek from the perspectives of several characters in a fictional TV show about the adventures of a starship and its crew who gradually become aware of their true nature.

The book was published by Tor Books in June 2012. An audiobook version was also produced with narration from Star Trek actor Wil Wheaton. Redshirts won the 2013 Hugo Award for Best Novel and Locus Award for Best Science Fiction Novel.

== Plot summary ==
In the prologue, several senior officers of the Intrepid, flagship of the Universal Union ("Dub-U"), lament the unusually high number of casualties of low-ranking crew members during recent away missions and conclude that they will need more crewmen to replace them.

The Intrepid takes on five new ensigns including Andrew Dahl, a former seminarian and expert in linguistics and xenobiology. Dahl quickly discerns that the crew is extremely phobic of being near the senior officers and of going on away missions due to their high fatality rate. Over the course of several missions, various crew members offer different theories as to such high losses, ranging from incompetence to a superstitious belief that "sacrifices" of some crew members are necessary so that others will survive.

After several close calls, Dahl makes contact with a mentally unstable crew member, Adam Jenkins, who offers a different theory: their reality and timeline are under periodic influence of a badly written television show, Chronicles of the Intrepid, from the past. As the writers create the plot, characters' free will temporarily ceases in order to progress "the Narrative". This is why otherwise good officers are occasionally incompetent, crewmen make poor decisions, and the ship has mysterious technology on board to produce last-minute inventions and medicines which would otherwise be impossible to produce: the Narrative is subject to the skill of the writers, who are neither military nor scientific experts and need to artificially maintain a high sense of drama with on-screen deaths. Jenkins explains that Dahl and the other ensigns' routine duties and colorful histories will inevitably make them targets of the Narrative when the writers need "glorified extras" to kill for emotional impact.

The ensigns kidnap a senior officer and proceed to travel to the past with the mission of convincing the show's creators to end the Narrative. Once there, they meet their actor doubles and realize that they are exact doppelgängers; even their imagined backstories became integral events of the ensigns' lives. Dahl strikes a deal with the show's producer and head writer, who is Jenkins' double, to save the life of the producer's comatose son by switching him with his crew member double. Because the producer's son appeared on the show as an extra, one of the crew members is effectively his identical twin and will revert to the young man's personality by staying in the past. Conversely, Dahl reasons that bringing the comatose son into the future will allow them to use the Narrative to their advantage, letting the advanced technology and reality-altering properties of the writing save his life.

Dahl and the ensigns return to the future and live out the new revised plot created by the head writer, which includes saving the "injured crewman" they had on board. Dahl is then fatally injured by a piece of shrapnel and resigns himself to death. Awakening later, Dahl learns that he has been promoted to Lieutenant and receives a message from the writers and producers explaining that they chose to save him, and that the remaining episodes of the show will feature the ensigns in meaningful scenarios rather than cheap deaths. Dahl then compares the close calls he has had with those of the TV show's protagonists, and deduces that there is another narrative protecting him, which makes him wonder if he is actually a protagonist in another story.

The novel features three epilogues. In the first one, the head writer deals with writer's block as a consequence of his bad writing choices. In the second one the producer's son, having reverted to his personality from the crewman who switched with him, determines to do something useful with the second chance at life he's been given. In the third one, a former actress, who once played an extra on the show, receives a message showing intimate details of the woman whose life—and death—she helped create. She memorializes her lost "sister" on a beach and meets the head writer of the show (who played her character's husband), and they decide to go on a date.

== Characters ==
New recruits on the Intrepid:

- Ensign Andrew Dahl, the protagonist. A gifted scientist and interpreter who quickly notices the dysfunctional nature of his new assignment.
- Ensign Maia Duvall, Kerensky's love interest and a security officer of Intrepid with extensive medical experience.
- Ensign James "Jimmy" Hanson IV, Dahl's best friend and member of Intrepid's engineering staff. His father is stated to be one of the richest men in the galaxy.
- Ensign Jasper Allen Hester. He's the only character without a detailed backstory because he was only created to allow the son of the show's producer to appear in the show. He trades places with the comatose son to save his life.
- Ensign Finn, a general maintenance specialist on Intrepid with a penchant for creating and distributing illegal narcotics. He is the only main character to die, killed when he shields Captain Abernathy from an assassination attempt.

Senior officers of Intrepid and protagonists of the TV show:

- Captain Lucius Abernathy. The ship's boisterous and loudmouthed commanding officer, who is reasonable whenever his actions aren't being controlled by the show's plot but makes terrible decisions whenever they are.
- Commander Q'eeng. Chief Science Officer and second-in-command of Intrepid. The novel's ending implies that he has suspicions about the nature of his world but purposefully chooses not to question it.
- Chief Engineer Paul West. Field missions including him are stated to be the most lethal to supporting characters.
- Lieutenant Anatoly Kerensky. Astrogator and Chief Tactical Officer of Intrepid. Receives life-threatening injuries in nearly every mission but heals with great speed in order to be ready for the next mission. He masks the trauma of these experiences with alcoholism and hedonistic pursuits.
- Senior Medical Officer Hartnell.

Other crew on the Intrepid:

- Ensign Adam Jenkins. Suffers a mental and emotional breakdown when his wife dies to advance the show's plot. He hides in the cargo tunnels and monitors all activity on the Intrepid using his computer skills. His observations result in a theory that the Intrepid's events are influenced by a long-forgotten TV show and allow him to devise a means by which the ensigns can travel to the past and change their fates.
- Lieutenant Collins, senior Xenobiology specialist and Dahl's initial superior before being promoted to Senior Ensign.
- Junior Lieutenant Ben Trin, Ensign Jake Cassaway, and Ensign Fiona Mbeke. Dahl's colleagues in the Xenobiology department. They use Jenkins' alerts to avoid being assigned to field missions with the senior officers, but a failure of this system leads to Cassaway and Mbeke dying in a field mission with Q'eeng.
- Ensign Tom Davis, shown in the prologue as having been devoured by "land worms" for a crucial plot point.
- Lieutenant Fischer. The Intrepid's inexperienced new security chief. His death on a mission with Kerensky serves as a revelation for Dahl as to how being in the presence of the ship's senior officers can mean the difference between life and death.
- Ensign Grover. A veteran crewmember who is about to retire and get married before he gets dragged into a field mission and killed.
- Ensign Sid Black. Dahl's predecessor in the Xenobiology department who might have survived his away mission but was deliberately "sacrificed" to preserve the lives of the other team members.

TV show cast and crew:

- Charles Paulson, head producer of the show.
- Matthew "Matt" Paulson, Charles' son and the actor who played Hester. Left in a coma following a motorcycle accident. Upon being taken to the future, he permanently assumes the identity of his character while the fictional Hester takes over his life.
- Nick Weinstein, chief writer of the show and the actor who played Jenkins.
- Mark Corey, the actor who plays Kerensky.
- Brian Abnett, the actor who plays Dahl.
- Samantha Martinez, the actress that played Jenkins' wife, security officer Margaret Jenkins.

== Themes ==
The novel satirizes common tropes such as redshirts, the "black box", and plot armor that often feature in television science fiction writing. In the course of the novel, Scalzi examines free will and what it takes to make one the hero of one's own story.

== Reception ==
John Schwartz of the New York Times noted that the plight of the Ensigns as they realize their situation as characters in a television drama was similar to Rosencrantz and Guildenstern Are Dead, where the story tells what happens when its characters find out they are not in the "real" storyline. Forbes magazine praised the novel saying "You don't have to be a hardcore sci-fi fan to enjoy Redshirts, though there are plenty of Easter Eggs for those who are. And the beauty of the book is that it works on multiple levels. If you're looking for a breezy, fun read for the beach, this is your book. If you want to go down a level and read it as a surreal meditation on character and genre like Rosencrantz and Guildenstern Are Dead, this is your book."

FX started developing a limited television series of the novel in 2014. However, nothing materialized and the production window closed in 2017 when the rights reverted to Scalzi.

Year	Award	Category	Result	Ref.
2013	Hugo Award	Novel	Won	
2013	Locus Award	Science Fiction Novel	Won	
2015	Seiun Award	Translated Novel	Finalist	
2016	Geffen Award	Translated Science Fiction Novel	Won	
