= When the Moon Hits Your Eye =

2025 novel by John Scalzi

- first edition
- Author: John Scalzi
- Language: English
- Genre: Science fiction
- Publisher: Tor Books
- Publication date: 25 March 2025
- Publication place: United States
- Media type: Print (hardcover), ebook, audiobook
- Pages: 336
- ISBN: 978-0-7653-8909-1

When the Moon Hits Your Eye is a science fiction novel written by American author John Scalzi. It was published in hardcover and ebook by Tor Books, large print hardcover by Thorndike Press, and audiobook by Audible Studios, on March 25, 2025. It was reissued in trade paperback by Tor Books on February 10, 2026. The first UK editions were issued by Tor UK, in hardcover and ebook on March 27, 2025, and in trade paperback on February 25, 2026. The novel consists of several mostly independent short stories about people dealing with the moon turning into cheese.

== Plot summary ==
At the Armstrong Air & Space Museum in Ohio, the executive director, Virgil Augustine, discovers that the moon rock sample has transformed into cheese. He reaches out to Space Center Houston, where officials verify this unexpected change. The moon now seems larger and brighter than previously observed. Experts and scientists at the White House confirm that the moon's size, makeup, and appearance have changed, and it is now referred to as Caseus. This new version of the moon includes geysers and an unstable atmosphere, though its mass remains the same. The administration of President Brett Boone reassures the public that there is no immediate threat, but they acknowledge their lack of understanding regarding the situation.

NASA has paused its space missions, postponing a scheduled lunar landing. While few perceive the new moon as a threat, many individuals are puzzled and struggle to accept what they are witnessing. Dayton Bailey, who penned a comedic book speculating on the moon's potential transformation into cheese, gains popularity as people search for explanations. Many individuals turn to faith for clarity, but religious institutions face challenges in interpreting the phenomenon. A cultural fascination with cheese emerges, boosting the sales of cheese shops.

With NASA ceasing its space operations, billionaire Jody Bannon looks for ways to secure the future of his aerospace venture. He leverages his wealth to persuade senators and representatives, advocating for them to press NASA for an expedited mission. As the head of PanGlobal Aerospace, Jody requires a lunar landing to secure a government contract. NASA consents to proceed but shifts the focus of the mission to simulations in low Earth orbit using HMS bots instead of a human crew.

Jody takes the initiative with the moon lander, Major Tom, and launches himself toward the moon without authorization. NASA attempts to portray this venture as part of their original plans. Jody tragically dies due to a geyser erupting during his landing, and his demise is broadcast to the public, drawing widespread attention. A significant fragment of the moon, named Lunar One, is sent towards Earth following an explosion, and scientists alert the public that it will collide with Earth in just over two years, leading to a slow apocalypse.

The response to the crisis differs between the public and private sectors. At BancUsonia, executives introduce a credit card program featuring high limits and low interest rates, appealing to those fearing their time may be limited to settle their debts. In contrast, government representatives opt to remain silent on the matter to prevent causing panic. Throughout the nation, people organize "Flip Off the Moon" gatherings to voice their anxieties. A demonstration by students outside a cheese shop in Wisconsin nearly escalates into violence but is ultimately contained when the owner of a rival cheese shop shows up to repel the attackers with a baseball bat. This starts a reconciliation between the two owners, who are long-estranged brothers, and whose employees have begun a secret romance.

Retired professor Clyde Ramsey invites his friends Dave and Alton to face the apocalypse together. Fantasy author Lessa Sarah Cirrincione contemplates abandoning her novel because of the unfolding crisis but decides to complete it for her husband, Hector. Jackie Hyland pays a visit to her ailing ex-husband, Ian Smythe, a well-regarded musician, and after his passing, she inherits a guitar and rights to his music, reflecting on their unconventional history.

Pastor James at Meadow Hill Church offers support to his church members, even as he grapples with his own uncertainties. During a service, Caleb interjects, questioning the significance of faith in a world poised for ruin. In reply, James responds on a community and purpose, promising to tackle obstacles in his congregation. A scandal involving Congress relates to a NASA jumpsuit and cheese, drawing significant media interest. An episode of Saturday Night Live encounters turmoil due to weak comedic content. At a gathering at the White House to watch the eclipse, Dayton and astronaut LeMae Anderson notice a shift when the anticipated total eclipse turns out to be annular. They discover that the original moon, now referred to as "Luna" by NASA, has reappeared, while Lunar One has vanished.

The day following Luna's return, President Boone declares that the danger is over, although the causes for the moon's alterations remain a mystery. NASA continues to monitor for any indications of Caseus resurfacing. As time passes, public sentiment evolves; a year later, discussions on Reddit and conspiracy forums propose that the cheese-moon incident was a fabrication by governments or businesses. Speculation circulates that Jody staged his own death, and by the tenth anniversary, a third of the American population questions the existence of Caseus. A hundred years later, official narratives label it as The Caseusian Hoax, asserting it was an elaborate media and technological conspiracy, and disregarding the moon samples as part of a coordinated deception.

== Reception ==
In a starred pre-publication review, Kirkus Reviews characterizes the event related in the book as a "ridiculous concept imbued with gravity, charm, humor, plausible cynicism, and pathos—and perhaps the merest touch of spite."

Publishers Weekly highlights how the novel's "ridiculous premise—what if the moon actually was made of cheese?—is treated with a straight face in [a] cleverly entertaining sci-fi romp," noting that "Scalzi’s ability to balance scathing satire with heartfelt optimism shines."

Marlene Harris in Library Journal observes that the "story isn't really about the moon; it's all about the reactions to it--what people think and feel and write and especially do when something fundamental to their understanding of the world changes in the blink of an eye, and they just have to cope." She feels the "novel can be read as hopeful. It's occasionally insightful, and ... frequently absolutely hilarious," assessing it as "chock-full of Scalzi's ... trademark humor, and readers who love humorous science fiction in general and this author in particular are going to be rolling on the floor laughing out loud while reading."

The novel was also reviewed by Kelly Jennings in Interzone, June 2025, and Joe Sherry in 2026 Hugo Awards Voter Packet.

== Awards ==
Year	Award	Category	Result	Ref.
2026	Astra Book Awards	Science Fiction Book	Won	
