= John Scalzi =

American science fiction writer (born 1969)

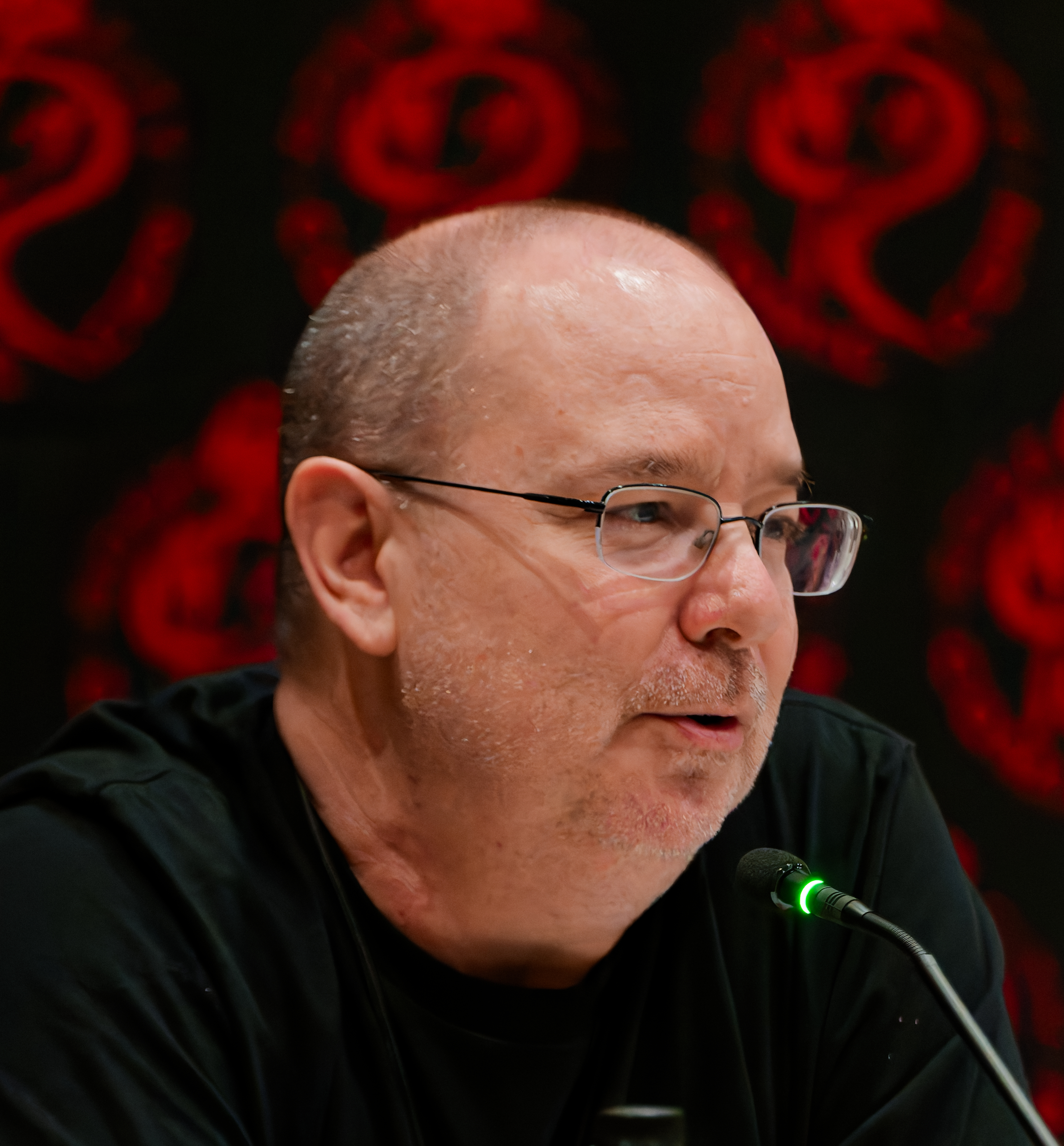
- Scalzi at the 2025 Rose City Comic Con
- Born: John Michael Scalzi II; May 10, 1969 (age 57); Fairfield, California, U.S.
- Education: University of Chicago (BA)
- Occupation: Writer
- Writing career
- Genre: Science fiction
- Notable awards: John W. Campbell Award for Best New Writer (2005); Hugo Award for Best Fan Writer (2008); Hugo Award for Best Related Book (2009); Hugo Award for Best Novel (2013); Locus Award for Best Science Fiction Novel (2018, 2023); Robert A. Heinlein Award (2023); Hugo Award for Best Series (2026)
- Website: scalzi.com

John Michael Scalzi II (born May 10, 1969) is an American science fiction author and former president of the Science Fiction and Fantasy Writers of America. He is best known for his Old Man's War series which won the Hugo Award for Best Series, and for his blog Whatever, where he has written on a number of topics since 1998. He won the Hugo Award for Best Fan Writer in 2008 based predominantly on that blog, which he has also used for several charity drives. He has written non-fiction books and columns on diverse topics such as finance, video games, films, astronomy, writing and politics, and served as a creative consultant for the TV series Stargate Universe.

His novel Redshirts won the Hugo Award for Best Novel; his novels The Collapsing Empire and The Kaiju Preservation Society have both won the Locus Award for Best Science Fiction Novel.

== Early life, education, and early career ==
Scalzi was born in Fairfield, California, on May 10, 1969. One of three children born to a single mother, he grew up in the Los Angeles suburbs of Covina, Glendora, Azusa, and San Dimas. He is of Italian descent.

Scalzi grew up reading science fiction and mystery, which inspired him to become a science fiction writer—a decision made randomly. As he recalled in an interview with the Dayton Daily News:

When I decided to start writing novels, I wanted to write in a genre I already knew and loved as a reader. So, it was either going to be science fiction or mystery. I decided to flip a coin. Heads was science fiction. Tails was mystery. The coin came up heads.

Scalzi's childhood was spent in poverty, an experience that inspired him to write his most famous essay, "Being Poor". He attended the Webb School of California, a boarding school in Claremont, on a scholarship. One of his classmates was blogger and journalist Josh Marshall.

After high school, Scalzi studied philosophy at the University of Chicago. Scalzi's thesis advisor, for a brief time, was Saul Bellow. Scalzi abandoned his course of study with Bellow after he was elected Student Ombudsman of the University. Ted Cohen, a philosophy professor, became his next thesis advisor, but Scalzi graduated without completing his thesis project. During his 1989–1990 school year, Scalzi was the editor-in-chief of The Chicago Maroon. He began writing professionally in 1990, while a college student, working freelance for the Chicago Sun-Times. Scalzi graduated from Chicago in 1991 with a Bachelor of Arts.

After graduating, Scalzi became a corporate consultant and wrote opinion columns and film reviews for The Fresno Bee. His experience as a film critic influenced his writing, particularly his humorous works, as films were meant to be an accessible form of storytelling. In 1996, he and his family moved to the Washington, D.C. area after he was hired as the in-house writer and editor at AOL. He was laid off in 1998, and since then he has been a full-time freelance writer and author.

Scalzi was first elected president of the Science Fiction and Fantasy Writers of America in 2010. He was the only nominee on the ballot. He had previously run as a write-in candidate in 2007, challenging the sole ballot nominee that year, but was not successful. He left office when his third term expired on June 30, 2013, having not sought reelection to a fourth term.

== Career ==
=== Fiction ===
Scalzi at Hugo Awards 2026

Scalzi's books are known for their humor. His style of writing has been influenced by Robert Heinlein, Orson Scott Card, and Joe Haldeman.

Scalzi's first novel, Agent to the Stars, was written in 1997 and published free to read on his website in 1999. He asked readers to donate money to him if they enjoyed the novel and earned around $4,000 over a period of five years. Subterranean Press released a limited-edition hardcover version in July 2005, featuring cover art from Penny Arcade artist Mike Krahulik; the novel was later released in trade and mass-market paperback by Tor and audiobook by Audible. A first-contact story, it is about a young Hollywood agent hired by a space alien to make their species more appealing to humans. It received mixed reviews; Booklist called it "absurd, funny, and satirically perceptive," while Publishers Weekly criticized the plot as predictable.

Scalzi's first traditionally published novel was Old Man's War, a military science fiction novel about a 75-year-old man who is recruited to fight a centuries-long war for human colonization of space. It was inspired by the works of Robert Heinlein, especially Starship Troopers. Scalzi intended to sell the book commercially, so he chose the genre of military science fiction because he felt it would be the most marketable. Like Agent to the Stars, it was first published on Whatever; Scalzi serialized a chapter a day in December 2002. Tor Books executive editor Patrick Nielsen Hayden offered to buy the novel, and it was published by Tor in January 2005. The novel became a finalist for the 2006 Hugo Award for Best Novel.

The Ghost Brigades was released in 2006. While a direct sequel to Old Man's War, it focuses not on John Perry, the protagonist of Old Man's War, but on the special forces units. 2006 also saw the release of The Android's Dream. A satire, it was well received by Publishers Weekly, which called it an "effervescent but intelligent romp"; it was criticized by Dave Itzkoff of The New York Times, who said it was "merely sarcastic when it should be satirical."

In August 2006, Scalzi was awarded the John W. Campbell Award for Best New Writer for best new science fiction writer of 2005.

In February 2007, a novelette set in the Old Man's War universe, called "The Sagan Diary", was published as a hardcover by Subterranean Press. Scalzi has commented that he originally wrote the book as free verse poetry, then converted it into prose format. An audio reading of "The Sagan Diary" was offered through Scalzi's website in February 2007, featuring the voices of fellow science fiction authors Elizabeth Bear, Mary Robinette Kowal, Ellen Kushner, Cherie Priest, Karen Meisner and Helen Smith. The third novel set in the same universe, The Last Colony, was released in April 2007. Zoe's Tale, the fourth Old Man's War novel, presenting a different view of the events covered in The Last Colony, was published in August 2008.

Also in 2008, Audible.com released the audiobook anthology METAtropolis, edited by Scalzi and featuring short fiction in a shared world created by Scalzi, Elizabeth Bear, Tobias Buckell, Jay Lake, and Karl Schroeder. METAtropolis was planned from the beginning to be released as an audio anthology prior to any print edition. The audiobook featured the voices of Battlestar Galactica actors Michael Hogan, Alessandro Juliani and Kandyse McClure and was a finalist for the Hugo Award for Best Dramatic Presentation, Long Form in 2009. A sequel audiobook, METAtropolis: Cascadia, edited by Jay Lake, was released in 2010. In 2009, Subterranean Press released a limited edition print run of METAtropolis, which was subsequently published by Tor in a standard hardcover edition in 2010.

Fuzzy Nation, Scalzi's ninth novel, was published on May 10, 2011. It began as a writing exercise. Scalzi explained that it had been "basically written just for the fun of it and for sort of getting into the habit of actually enjoying writing science fiction again." It was an adaptation of Little Fuzzy, published by H. Beam Piper in 1962, and was authorized by the Piper estate.

His 2012 book Redshirts: A Novel with Three Codas won the 2013 Hugo Award for Best Novel. Scalzi decided to write Redshirts after noticing that while many short satirical works dealt with the idea of 'redshirts'—the unnamed, low-ranking characters of Star Trek who always died on away missions, there was a dearth of novels exploring the concept.

On May 24, 2015, Tor announced that it had agreed to a $3.4 million deal with Scalzi spanning 10 years and 13 books: 10 adult books and three young adult books. Among the books included in this deal were another book within his Old Man's War universe, Head On, a new space opera series, and several standalone books. The deal was finalized on November 25, 2015. The first book produced in this contract was the space opera The Collapsing Empire in March 2017.

In 2019, three of his short stories were adapted for episodes of the first season of the Netflix anthology series Love, Death & Robots: "Three Robots", "When the Yogurt Took Over", and "Missives From Possible Futures #1: Alternate History Search Results", the latter being retitled "Alternate Histories." His story "Automated Customer Service" was also adapted for the second season of Love, Death & Robots, with Scalzi himself co-writing the script. Scalzi wrote a sequel to "Three Robots" for the third season of the series. Two more of his stories were adapted for the fourth season.

His 2022 novel The Kaiju Preservation Society won a 2023 Alex Award and the 2023 Locus Award for Best Science Fiction Novel. In 2023 he received the Robert A. Heinlein Award. His 2023 novel Starter Villain won the Locus Award the following year.

In 2024, Tor Books announced that they signed a deal for 10 more books by Scalzi.

In 2026, his Old Man's War series won the Hugo Award for Best Series.

=== Non-fiction ===
Though best known for his science fiction works, Scalzi has written several non-fiction books as well, including a trio for London publisher Rough Guides' reference line of books. The first of these was The Rough Guide to Money Online, released in late October 2000. This reference book featured tips on using online financial tools. According to Scalzi, it did less-than-expected business, possibly due to the collapse of the Internet bubble at about the same time the book was released. Scalzi's next non-fiction book was The Rough Guide to the Universe, an astronomy book designed for novice-to-intermediate stargazers, released in May 2003. Scalzi's third book for Rough Guides, The Rough Guide to Sci-Fi Movies, was released in October 2005. This book covered the history of science fiction and science fiction film and listed a "canon" of 50 significant science fiction films.

Scalzi is also the author of the "Book of the Dumb" series of books from Portable Press. These books chronicle people doing stupid things. The first book in the series was released in October 2003 with a second following a year later.

In November 2005, Scalzi announced that entries from the run of the Whatever, his blog, would be compiled into a book from Subterranean Press. The book, You're Not Fooling Anyone When You Take Your Laptop to a Coffee Shop: Scalzi on Writing; was released by Subterranean Press in February 2007. Another collection of entries from Whatever, entitled Your Hate Mail Will Be Graded: A Decade of Whatever 1998–2008 was released in September 2008. It subsequently won the Hugo Award for Best Related Book in 2009. A third collection, The Mallet of Loving Correction, was released in 2013 and named after his nickname for moderating activities on his blog. A fourth collection, Don't Live For Your Obituary, was released in December 2017.

=== Online and other writing ===
Scalzi began writing for his personal blog Whatever in September 1998. He started it because he wanted to practice writing in a newspaper- or column-like format, which he had done prior to his novel-writing career. The name suggests the wide range of topics Scalzi writes about there, although many of Scalzi's postings center on the topics of politics and writing. A number of writings originally posted there have gone on to be published in traditional media, including his "I Hate Your Politics" and "Being Poor" entries, the latter of which was published in the op-ed pages of the Chicago Tribune in September 2005. His essay "Being Poor" was based on his own experiences growing up in poverty.

Scalzi also used Whatever as a way to solicit fiction and non-fiction submissions on the theme of Science Fiction Clichés in 2005 for issue No. 4 of Subterranean Magazine, which he guest edited (published in 2006 by Subterranean Press). The original solicitation was posted in March 2005 with the unique requirements that submissions would only be accepted electronically in plain text, and ONLY during the period between 10/1/05 and 11/1/05 instead of before a traditional deadline. After the print run sold out, the issue was made available online as a free download.

Scalzi's own short story, How I Proposed to My Wife: An Alien Sex Story, was not printed in the magazine itself but only in a separated chapter book reserved for the people who bought the hardcover limited edition. In April 2008 Scalzi released the story as a "shareware short story" on his website.

On March 29, 2007, it was announced that Scalzi had again been nominated for a Hugo Award, this time in the category Best Fan Writer, for his online writing about the science-fiction field. He was the first Campbell Award winner to receive a nomination in this category. In 2008, he was again nominated for the Best Fan Writer Hugo, this time winning the award, becoming the first person to be nominated for that category and the Best Novel Hugo award at the same time since 1970.

Scalzi also uses Whatever to help raise money for organizations and causes that he supports. Notably, in June 2007 he raised over $5000 in 6 days for Americans United for the Separation of Church and State after fellow writer Joe Hill challenged him to go visit the Creation Museum that had just opened near Cincinnati, not far from Scalzi's Ohio home, if Hill paid for the ticket, offering to match the cost with a donation to the charity of Scalzi's choice after he filed a comprehensive report on the trip online. Scalzi extended the deal to all Whatever readers, raised 256 times the admission price, and posted his critical report on the Creation Museum on November 12, 2007. In September 2010 he joined with Subterranean Press and authors Wil Wheaton, Patrick Rothfuss, Catherynne M. Valente, Rachel Swirsky and others to create a story collection called Clash of the Geeks, offered online in exchange for donations to the Michigan/Indiana affiliate of the Lupus Alliance of America. Some of the stories were selected from a competition run on Whatever to write a story to explain a painting Scalzi had commissioned from Jeff Zugale, which featured Scalzi as an orc and Wheaton riding a unicorn pegasus kitten.

Scalzi's notable online presence and support for feminist causes have often led to harassment and trolling. After writing a satirical blog post in October 2012 criticizing some conservative politicians for their positions on abortion, Scalzi was targeted by writer Vox Day and his supporters. Scalzi pledged to donate $5 to RAINN, Emily's List, the Human Rights Campaign, and the NAACP every time Day mentioned him on his website. While he capped his donation at $1,000, Scalzi raised over $50,000 after others, including actor Wil Wheaton, promised to match this pledge.

In addition to his personal site, Scalzi was a professional blogger for America Online's AOL Journals and AIM Blogs service from August 2003 through December 2007. In this role he created participatory entries (most notably the Weekend Assignment and Monday Photo Shoot), answered questions about blogging from AOL members, and posted interesting links for readers. Readers of both Scalzi's personal site and his AOL Journal "By the Way" noted distinct differences in tone at each site. Scalzi has acknowledged this tonal difference, based on the different missions of each site. Scalzi also blogged professionally for AOL's Ficlets site beginning in March 2007, writing about literature and other related topics. On December 7, 2007, Scalzi announced that by mutual agreement, his contract with AOL would not be renewed at the end of the year, in part so that he would have more time to devote to writing books.

In 2008, Scalzi began writing a weekly column on science fiction/fantasy films for AMCTV.com, the Web site of cable television network AMC.

In 2009, Scalzi was a creative consultant on science-fiction television show Stargate Universe. He was credited as such for 39 episodes.

On April 1, 2011, Tor Books collaborated with Scalzi on an April Fool's prank, with Tor claiming "Tor Books is proud to announce the launch of John Scalzi's new fantasy trilogy, The Shadow War of the Night Dragons, which kicks off with book one: The Dead City." This excerpt from an imaginary novel took on a life of its own, winning the 2011 Tor.com Readers' Choice Awards for short fiction. It was also nominated for the 2012 Hugo Award for Best Short Story. This was followed up on April 1, 2013 by an "announcement" about a musical production based on the series.

Scalzi was the writer for the 2015 mobile device video game by Industrial Toys called Midnight Star. Scalzi wrote the story for the prequel to the game, in a graphic novel called Midnight Rises.

On March 30, 2016, the Los Angeles Times announced that Scalzi was one of ten "Critics-at-Large" who would contribute to the newspaper as a columnist writing on literature and culture.

== Personal life ==
He met his wife Kristine Ann Blauser when he was living in Fresno, and they married in 1995. His only child, a daughter, was born in 1998. He and his family live in Bradford, Ohio, where they moved in 2001 to be closer to his wife's family. Scalzi has declared himself a feminist and, formerly, a Rockefeller Republican, though he currently supports the Democratic Party. He supports same-sex marriage and the LGBTQ community.

== Awards and honors ==
Asteroid 52692 Johnscalzi, discovered by the Spacewatch Project, was named in his honor.

Awards for fiction
Year	Work	Award	Category	Result	Ref.
2006	Old Man's War	Hugo Award	Novel	Finalist	
2006	Old Man's War	John W. Campbell Award for Best New Writer	—	Won	
2006	Old Man's War	Locus Award	First Novel	Finalist	
2007	The Ghost Brigades	Prometheus Award	—	Finalist	
2007	"Missives from Possible Futures #1: Alternate History Search Results"	Sidewise Award	Short Form	Finalist	
2007	Old Man's War	Geffen Award	Translated Science Fiction Novel	Won	
2008	The Last Colony	Hugo Award	Novel	Finalist	
2008	Old Man's War	Seiun Award	Translated Long Form	Finalist	
2008	Zoe's Tale	Romantic Times Reviewer's Choice Award	Science Fiction Novel	Finalist	
2009	"After the Coup"	Locus Award	Short Story	Finalist	
2009	The Ghost Brigades	Seiun Award	Translated Long Form	Finalist	
2009	The God Engines	Nebula Award	Novella	Finalist	
2009	Zoe's Tale	Andre Norton Award	—	Finalist	
2009	Zoe's Tale	Hugo Award	Novel	Finalist	
2009	Zoe's Tale	Locus Award	Young Adult Book	Finalist	
2010	The Android's Dream	Kurd-Laßwitz-Preis	Translated Novel	Won	
2010	The God Engines	Hugo Award	Novella	Finalist	
2010	The Last Colony	Seiun Award	Translated Novel	Won	
2012	Fuzzy Nation	Audie Award	Science Fiction	Won	
2012	"Shadow War of the Night Dragons, Book One: The Dead City (Prologue)"	Hugo Award	Short Story	Finalist	
2013	The Android's Dream	Seiun Award	Translated Novel	Won	
2013	Redshirts	Hugo Award	Novel	Won	
2013	Redshirts	Locus Award	Science Fiction Novel	Won	
2015	Lock In	Campbell Memorial Award	—	Finalist	
2015	Lock In	Locus Award	Science Fiction Novel	Finalist	
2015	Redshirts	Seiun Award	Translated Novel	Finalist	
2016	The End of All Things	Dragon Award	Science Fiction Novel	Nominated	
2016	Redshirts	Geffen Award	Translated Science Fiction Novel	Won	
2017	The Collapsing Empire	Dragon Award	Science Fiction Novel	Nominated	
2017	The Collapsing Empire	Goodreads Choice Awards	Science Fiction	Finalist	
2017	The Dispatcher	Locus Award	Novella	Finalist	
2018	The Collapsing Empire	Locus Award	Science Fiction Novel	Won	
2018	The Collapsing Empire	Hugo Award	Novel	Finalist	
2020	The Last Emperox	Dragon Award	Science Fiction Novel	Won	
2021	The Interdependency	Hugo Award	Series	Finalist	
2021	The Last Emperox	Locus Award	Science Fiction Novel	Finalist	
2022	The Kaiju Preservation Society	Dragon Award	Science Fiction Novel	Nominated	
2022	The Kaiju Preservation Society	Goodreads Choice Awards	Science Fiction	Finalist	
2023	The Kaiju Preservation Society	Alex Award	—	Won	
2023	The Kaiju Preservation Society	Hugo Award	Novel	Finalist	
2023	The Kaiju Preservation Society	Locus Award	Science Fiction Novel	Won	
2024	The Kaiju Preservation Society	Seiun Award	Translated Novel	Won	
2024	Starter Villain	Dragon Award	Science Fiction Novel	Won	
2024	Starter Villain	Hugo Award	Novel	Finalist	
2024	Starter Villain	Locus Award	Science Fiction Novel	Finalist	
2026	The Shattering Peace	Locus Award	Science Fiction Novel	Finalist	
2026	Old Man's War series	Hugo Award	Best Series	Won	

Other awards
Year	Work	Award	Category	Result	Ref.
2007	—N/a	Hugo Award	Fan Writer	Finalist	
2008	—N/a	Hugo Award	Fan Writer	Won	
2009	METAtropolis	Hugo Award	Dramatic Presentation, Long Form	Finalist	
2009	Your Hate Mail Will Be Graded: A Decade of Whatever 1998–2008	Hugo Award	Related Work	Won	
2010	Whatever	British Fantasy Award	Nonfiction	Finalist	
2016	—N/a	Ohio Governor's Award	Individual Artist	Won	
2018	Don't Live For Your Obituary	Locus Award	Non-fiction	Finalist	
2023	—N/a	Robert A. Heinlein Award	—	Won	

== Works ==
=== Series fiction ===
==== Old Man's War universe ====
- Old Man's War (2005, Tor Books, ISBN 0-7653-0940-8)
- Questions for a Soldier (December 2005, chapbook, Subterranean Press, ISBN 1-59606-048-4)
- The Ghost Brigades (February 2006, Tor Books, ISBN 0-7653-1502-5)
- The Sagan Diary (February 2007, Subterranean Press, ISBN 978-1-59606-103-3)
- The Last Colony (April 2007, Tor Books, ISBN 0-7653-1697-8)
- Zoe's Tale (August 2008, Tor Books, ISBN 0-7653-1698-6)
- After the Coup (July 2008, ebook, Tor.com)
- The Human Division (January – April 2013, serialized ebooks; collected, May 2013, Tor Books, ISBN 978-0-7653-3351-3)
- The End of All Things (June 2015, serialized ebooks; collected, August 2015, Tor Books, ISBN 978-0-7653-7607-7)
- The Shattering Peace (September 2025, Tor Books, ISBN 978-0-7653-8919-0)

==== The Android's Dream universe ====
- The Android's Dream (October 2006, Tor Books, ISBN 0-7653-0941-6)
- Judge Sn Goes Golfing (December 2009, chapbook, Subterranean Press)

==== Lock In universe ====
- Unlocked: An Oral History of Haden's Syndrome (Novella, May 2014, Subterranean Press, ISBN 978-1-59606-683-0)
- Lock In (August 2014, Tor Books, ISBN 978-0-7653-7586-5)
- Head On (April 2018, Tor Books, ISBN 978-0-7653-8891-9)

==== The Interdependency series ====
- The Collapsing Empire (March 2017, Tor Books, ISBN 978-0-7653-8888-9)
- The Consuming Fire (October 2018, Tor Books, ISBN 978-0-7653-8897-1)
- The Last Emperox (April 2020, Tor Books, ISBN 978-0-7653-8916-9)

==== The Dispatcher series ====
- The Dispatcher (October 2016, audiobook, Audible Studios; April 2017, ebook, Subterranean Press; May 2017, hardcover, Subterranean Press, ISBN 978-1-59606-786-8)
- Murder by Other Means (September 2020, audiobook, Audible Studios; April 2021, ebook, Subterranean Press; April 2021, hardcover, Subterranean Press, ISBN 978-1645240174)
- Travel by Bullet (September 2022, audiobook, Audible Originals)

=== Stand-alone fiction ===
==== Stand-alone novels ====
- Agent to the Stars (available on Scalzi's website in 1999; August 2005 Subterranean Press, ISBN 1-59606-020-4; October 2008, Tor Books, ISBN 0-7653-1771-0)
- Fuzzy Nation (May 2011, Tor Books, ISBN 0-7653-2854-2)
- Redshirts (June 2012, Tor Books, ISBN 0-76531-699-4)
- The Kaiju Preservation Society (March 15, 2022, Tor Books, ISBN 978-0-7653-8912-1)
- Starter Villain (September 19, 2023, Tor Books, ISBN 978-0-7653-8922-0)
- When the Moon Hits Your Eye (March 25, 2025, Tor Books, ISBN 978-0-7653-8909-1)
- Monsters of Ohio (November 3, 2026, Tor Books, ISBN 978-0765389046)

==== Stand-alone novellas and novelettes ====
- The God Engines (December 2009, Subterranean Press, ISBN 978-1-59606-299-3)
- Constituent Service (October 2024, Audiobook by Audible, Subterranean Press, ISBN 978-1-64524-284-0; November 2025, Subterranean Press, ISBN 978-1-64524-284-0)

==== Stand-alone short fiction ====
- "Alien Animal Encounters" (Strange Horizons (online), October 15, 2001)
- "New Directives for Employee-Manxtse Interactions" (published in Chapbook titled "Sketches of Daily Life: Two Missives From Possible Futures" by Subterranean Press, 2005. Chapbook also reprinted "Alien Animal Encounters")
- "Missives from Possible Futures #1: Alternate History Search Results" (Subterranean Magazine, online edition, February 2007)
- "How I Proposed to My Wife: An Alien Sex Story" (chapbook, Subterranean Press, 2007; available as shareware in April 2008)
- "Pluto Tells All" (Subterranean Magazine, online edition), May 2007
- "Utere nihil non extra quiritationem suis" (METAtropolis, Audible.com, 2008, Subterranean Press 2009, Tor Books 2010)
- "Denise Jones, Superbooker" (Subterranean Magazine, online edition), September 2008)
- "The Tale of the Wicked" (The New Space Opera 2 anthology, June 2009)
- "The President's Brain is Missing" (Tor.com, July 2010)
- "An Election" (Subterranean Magazine presented story on Scalzi's blog, online edition), November 2010
- "The Shadow War of the Night Dragons" (Tor Books, fictional excerpt parody, April 1, 2011)
- "The Other Large Thing" (Short story first published on Tweetdeck's "Deck.Ly" reprinted on Scalzi's blog), August 2011
- "Muse of Fire" (Subterranean Press, September 9, 2013)
- Miniatures: The Very Short Fiction of John Scalzi (Short story collection published by Subterranean Press, December 31, 2016)
- A Very Scalzi Christmas (Short story collection published by Subterranean Press, November 2019)
- 3 Days, 9 Months, 27 Years (The Time Traveler’s Passport collection, Amazon Original Stories 2025)

=== Non-fiction books ===
- The Rough Guide to Money Online (October 2000, Rough Guide Books)
- The Rough Guide to the Universe (May 2003, Rough Guide Books, ISBN 1-85828-939-4)
- Book of the Dumb (November 2003, Portable Press, ISBN 1-59223-149-7)
- Book of the Dumb 2 (November 2004, Portable Press, ISBN 1-59223-269-8)
- The Rough Guide to Sci-Fi Movies (October 2005, Rough Guide Books, ISBN 1-84353-520-3)
- You're Not Fooling Anyone When You Take Your Laptop to a Coffee Shop: Scalzi on Writing (2007, Subterranean Press, ISBN 1-59606-063-8)
- Your Hate Mail Will Be Graded: Selected Writing, 1998–2008 (2008, Subterranean Press, ISBN 1-59606-211-8).
- The Mallet of Loving Correction (2013, Subterranean Press, ISBN 1-59606-579-6)
- Don't Live For Your Obituary: Advice, Commentary and Personal Observations on Writing, 2008–2017 (2017, Subterranean Press ISBN 978-1-59606-858-2)

=== Editor ===
- Subterranean Magazine, #4 (2006, Subterranean Press)
- METAtropolis (2008, Audible; 2009, Subterranean Press ISBN 1-59606-238-X ; 2010 Tor Books, ISBN 0-7653-2710-4)
