= The Last Emperox =

Science fiction novel by John Scalzi

- Original cover art
- Author: John Scalzi
- Cover artist: Nicolas "Sparth" Bouvier
- Language: English
- Series: The Interdependency series
- Genre: Science fiction (space opera)
- Publisher: Tor Books
- Publication date: April 14, 2020
- Publication place: United States of America
- Pages: 320
- ISBN: 978-0-7653-8916-9
- Preceded by: The Consuming Fire

The Last Emperox is a space opera novel by American writer John Scalzi. The book was published by Tor Books on April 14, 2020. Audible released an audio book version narrated by Wil Wheaton. It is the final volume in The Interdependency trilogy series and a sequel to The Consuming Fire. The Last Emperox opened at #6 on The New York Times bestseller list for combined print and e-book fiction and #14 on the USA Today bestseller list.

== Plot ==
With news spreading of the predicted total collapse of the Flow streams connecting the star systems of the Interdependency and the unavoidable resulting fall of the empire, the Interdependency system of End has become crucial as the only one with a planet able to sustain life outside of a closed habitat. The disgraced House of Nohamapetan has taken control of End and blockaded its only remaining incoming Flow stream to maximize power and profits for their House and to prevent an unsustainable surge of billions of refugees to the planet.

Back in the Hub planet system, Emperox Grayland II consults with her Memory Room – the recorded thoughts and emotional states of every single previous emperox – in search of an unlikely solution to save the entire population of the Interdependency. She plans to break the Nohamapetan blockade of End via a predicted new "evanescent" Flow stream into the End system. Meanwhile, Marce Claremont, a scientific advisor and eventual secret fiancé to Grayland, discovers a possible new method for controlling the evanescent Flow streams which may allow for the transport of whole habitats to the End system, thus preventing an overburden on the planet itself.

Meanwhile, Kiva Lagos – the imperially-appointed administrator of the House of Nohamapetan – discovers and warns Grayland that Nadashe Nohamapetan and Grayland's own House of Wu are plotting to depose Grayland and implement a plan to preserve the Noble Houses at the expense of the general populace. Grayland and Kiva devise a counterplot to infiltrate the conspirators, but Nadashe, who has enlisted many sympathetic Noble Houses to aid her plot and endorse her as the next Emperox, kidnaps Kiva and holds her hostage. Grayland discovers that her Memory Room is, in fact, the singular still-living consciousness of the first Emperox – Rachela I. Grayland enlists her aid in defeating the coup and saving the people of the Interdependency but eventually succumbs to an assassination attempt orchestrated by Nadashe.

Kiva escapes her captors and returns to Hub where she finds Nadashe occupying the imperial palace. Kiva is imprisoned while Nadashe awaits lengthy preparations for her coronation. When the coronation day arrives, the ceremony is interrupted by a "ghost" of Grayland, who has preserved her consciousness in the same way as Rachela with her help. Grayland, whose consciousness is able to live outside of the Memory Room and has broadly infiltrated Interdependency communications and control systems, stages a remote jailbreak of Kiva, provides recorded evidence of the coup plot, and reveals she had secretly named Kiva as her successor to the imperial throne prior to her assassination. Grayland unilaterally ends the regulated monopolies of the Noble Houses, releases their trade secrets in order to aid the soon-to-be isolated systems, dissolves the House of Nohamapetan, and reveals a long-term plan to save the people of the disparate systems of the Interdependency over many decades and centuries through the use of evanescent Flow.

The blockade at End is broken using clearance codes intercepted by Grayland. Kiva commits to remaining behind with the people of Hub after the collapse of the Flow. Marce is enticed to explore the systems of old Earth through a newly discovered evanescent Flow stream. In a punishment devised by Grayland as ironically "giving Nadashe what she wants," Nadashe is imprisoned indefinitely on End with her mother and brother Ghreni.

== Reception ==
The Publishers Weekly review is very positive and saying that "Scalzi knocks it out of the park with the tightly plotted, deeply satisfying conclusion to his Interdependency Sequence space opera trilogy."

Year	Award	Category	Result	Ref.
2020	Dragon Award	Science Fiction Novel	Won	
2021	Locus Award	Science Fiction Novel	Finalist	
