= Audie Award for Science Fiction =

Science fiction audiobook award

The Audie Award for Science Fiction is one of the Audie Awards presented annually by the Audio Publishers Association (APA). It awards excellence in narration, production, and content for a science-fiction audiobook released in a given year. It has been awarded since 2003.

== Winners and finalists ==
=== 2000s ===
Year	Audiobook	Author(s)	Narrator(s)	Publisher	Result	Ref.
2003 8th	Dune: The Butlerian Jihad (2002)	Brian Herbert and Kevin J. Anderson	Scott Brick	Books on Tape	Winner	
2003 8th	Catch the Lightning (1998)	Catherine Asaro	Anna Fields	Blackstone Audio	Finalist	
2003 8th	The Fifth Sorceress (2002)	Robert Newcomb	John Lee	Books on Tape	Finalist	
2003 8th	The Pillars of Creation (2001)	Terry Goodkind	Jim Bond	Brilliance Audio	Finalist	
2003 8th	Thief of Time (2001)	Terry Pratchett	Stephen Briggs	Ulverscroft Large Print	Finalist	
2004 9th	Monstrous Regiment (2003)	Terry Pratchett	Stephen Briggs	HarperAudio	Winner	
2004 9th	Darwin's Children (2003)	Greg Bear	Scott Brick	Books on Tape	Finalist	
2004 9th	Dune: The Machine Crusade (2003)	Brian Herbert and Kevin J. Anderson	Scott Brick	Audio Renaissance	Finalist	
2004 9th	Still Life with Crows (2003)	Douglas Preston and Lincoln Child	René Auberjonois	Time Warner AudioBooks	Finalist	
2004 9th	The Callahan Chronicles (1988)	Spider Robinson	Barrett Whitener	Blackstone Audio	Finalist	
2005 10th	Lost Boys (1992)	Orson Scott Card	Stefan Rudnicki	Blackstone Audio	Winner	
2005 10th	Brimstone (2004)	Douglas Preston and Lincoln Child	René Auberjonois	Time Warner AudioBooks	Finalist	
2005 10th	The Consciousness Plague (2002)	Paul Levinson	Mark Shanahan	Listen & Live Audio	Finalist	
2005 10th	Horizon Storms (2004)	Kevin J. Anderson	George Guidall	Recorded Books	Finalist	
2005 10th	The Quantum Rose (2000)	Catherine Asaro	Anna Fields	Blackstone Audio	Finalist	
2006 11th	Market Forces (2004)	Richard K. Morgan	Simon Vance	Tantor Audio	Winner	
2006 11th	Dragonsblood (2005)	Todd McCaffrey	Dick Hill	Brilliance Audio	Finalist	
2006 11th	Shadow of the Giant (2005)	Orson Scott Card	David Birney, Scott Brick, and full cast	Audio Renaissance	Finalist	
2006 11th	The Rolling Stones (1952)	Robert A. Heinlein	David Baker	Full Cast Audio	Finalist	
2006 11th	The Vor Game (1990)	Lois McMaster Bujold	Grover Gardner	Blackstone Audio	Finalist	
2007 12th	Stolen Child (2006)	Keith Donohue	Andy Paris and Jeff Woodman	Recorded Books	Winner	
2007 12th	Callahan's Legacy (1996)	Spider Robinson	Spider Robinson	Blackstone Audio	Finalist	
2007 12th	Street Magic (2001)	Tamora Pierce	Bruce Coville and full cast	Full Cast Audio	Finalist	
2007 12th	The Incredible Shrinking Man (1956)	Richard Matheson	Yuri Rasovsky	Blackstone Audio	Finalist	
2007 12th	Voyagers (1981)	Ben Bova	Stefan Rudnicki	Blackstone Audio	Finalist	
2008 13th	Dune (1965)	Frank Herbert	Scott Brick, Orlagh Cassidy, Euan Morton, Simon Vance, and Ilyana Kadushin	Audible	Winner	
2008 13th	The Draco Tavern (2006)	Larry Niven	Tom Weiner	Blackstone Audio	Finalist	
2008 13th	The Invasion of the Body Snatchers (1955)	Jack Finney	Kristoffer Tabori	Blackstone Audio	Finalist	
2008 13th	Ravens of Avalon (2007)	Diana L. Paxson	Lorna Raver	Tantor Audio	Finalist	
2008 13th	Selections from Dreamsongs 1 (2003)	George R. R. Martin	Claudia Black, Mark Bramhall, Scott Brick, Roy Dotrice, Kim Mai Guest, Kirby Heyborne, and Adrian Paul	Random House Audio	Finalist	
2009 14th	Calculating God (2000)	Robert J. Sawyer	Jonathan Davis and Robert J. Sawyer	Audible	Winner	
2009 14th	Childhood's End (1954)	Arthur C. Clarke	Erich Michael Summerer	Audible	Finalist	
2009 14th	Ghost Radio (2008)	Leopoldo Gout	Pedro Pascal	HarperAudio	Finalist	
2009 14th	Skybreaker (2005)	Kenneth Oppel	David Kelly	Full Cast Audio	Finalist	
2009 14th	Sunrise Alley (2004)	Catherine Asaro	Hillary Huber	Blackstone Audio	Finalist	

=== 2010s ===
Year	Audiobook	Author(s)	Narrator(s)	Publisher	Result	Ref.
2010 15th	Bellwether (1996)	Connie Willis	Kate Reading	Blackstone Audio	Winner	
2010 15th	The Gathering Storm (2009)	Robert Jordan and Brandon Sanderson	Kate Reading and Michael Kramer	Macmillan Audio	Finalist	
2010 15th	Kushiel's Dart (2001)	Jacqueline Carey	Anne Flosnik	Tantor Audio	Finalist	
2010 15th	Kushiel's Scion (2006) Jacqueline Carey	Jacqueline Carey	Simon Vance	Tantor Audio	Finalist	
2010 15th	Podkayne of Mars (1963)	Robert A. Heinlein	Emily Janice Card	Blackstone Audio	Finalist	
2011 16th	Jitters (2010)	Adele Parks	Adele Park, Susan Paige Lane, and full cast	Straight to Audio Productions	Winner	
2011 16th	Great Classic Science Fiction (1911–1962)	H. G. Wells, Stanley G. Weinbaum, et al.	Simon Vance, Barbara Rosenblat, et al.	AudioGO	Finalist	
2011 16th	Room (2010)	Emma Donoghue	Michal Friedman, Ellen Archer, Robert Petkoff, and Suzanne Toren	Hachette Audio	Finalist	
2011 16th	The Shadow Effect (2009)	Deepak Chopra, Debbie Ford, and Marianne Williamson	Deepak Chopra, Debbie Ford, and Marianne Williamson	HarperAudio	Finalist	
2011 16th	The Importance of Being Earnest (1895)	Oscar Wilde	Emily Bergl, Charles Busch, Neil Dickson, Jill Gascoine, James Marsters, Christopher Neame, and Matthew Wolf	L.A. Theatre Works	Finalist	
2012 17th	The Stainless Steel Rat (1961)	Harry Harrison	Phil Gigante	Brilliance Audio	Winner	
2012 17th	Watch (2010)	Robert J. Sawyer	Jessica Almasy, Marc Vietor, Oliver Wyman, Jennifer Van Dyck, and Robert J. Sawyer	Audible	Finalist	
2012 17th	The Day of the Triffids (1951)	John Wyndham	Graeme Malcolm	Audible	Finalist	
2012 17th	Black Magic Sanction (2010)	Kim Harrison	Marguerite Gavin	Blackstone Audio	Finalist	
2012 17th	Feed (2010)	Mira Grant	Paula Christensen and Jesse Bernstein	Hachette Audio	Finalist	
2012 17th	Halo: Evolutions (2009)	Tobias Buckell, Jonathan Goff, et al.	Steve Downes, Holter Graham, Frank O'Connor, and Jen Taylor	Macmillan Audio	Finalist	
2013 18th	The Age of Miracles (2012)	Karen Thompson Walker	Emily Rankin	Random House Audio	Winner	
2013 18th	14 (2013)	Peter Clines	Ray Porter	Audible	Finalist	
2013 18th	Agatha H. and the Clockwork Princess (2012)	Phil Foglio and Kaja Foglio	Angela Dawe	Brilliance Audio	Finalist	
2013 18th	Invincible (2012)	Jack Campbell	Christian Rummel	Audible	Finalist	
2013 18th	Pure (2012)	Julianna Baggott	Julianna Baggott, Khristine Hvam, Joshua Swanson, Kevin T. Collins, and Casey Holloway	Hachette Audio	Finalist	
2014 19th	Captain Vorpatril's Alliance (2012)	Lois McMaster Bujold	Grover Gardner	Blackstone Audio	Winner	
2014 19th	Extinction Machine (2013)	Jonathan Maberry	Ray Porter	Macmillan Audio	Finalist	
2014 19th	MaddAddam (2013)	Margaret Atwood	Bernadette Dunn, Bob Walter, and Robbie Daymond	Random House Audio/Books on Tape	Finalist	
2014 19th	The Martian (2011)	Andy Weir	R. C. Bray	Podium Publishing	Finalist	
2014 19th	Protector (2013)	C. J. Cherryh	Daniel Thomas May	Audible	Finalist	
2014 19th	Shaman (2013)	Kim Stanley Robinson	Graeme Malcolm	Hachette Audio	Finalist	
2015 20th	The Martian (revised) (2011)	Andy Weir	R. C. Bray	Podium Publishing	Winner	
2015 20th	The Beam: Season 1 (2014)	Sean Platt and Johnny B. Truant	Johnny Heller, Tara Sands, and full cast	Podium Publishing	Finalist	
2015 20th	Dark Eden (2012)	Chris Beckett	Matthew Frow, Jayne Entwistle, and full cast	Penguin Random House Audio	Finalist	
2015 20th	The First Fifteen Lives of Harry August (2014)	Claire North	Peter Kenny	Hachette Audio	Finalist	
2015 20th	Lock In (2014)	John Scalzi	Wil Wheaton, Amber Benson, and full cast	Audible	Finalist	
2016 21st	Jurassic Park (1990)	Michael Crichton	Scott Brick	Brilliance Audio	Winner	
2016 21st	Ancillary Mercy (2015)	Ann Leckie	Adjoa Andoh	Hachette Audio	Finalist	
2016 21st	Aurora (2015)	Kim Stanley Robinson	Ali Ahn	Hachette Audio	Finalist	
2016 21st	Golden Son (2015)	Pierce Brown	Tim Gerard Reynolds	Recorded Books	Finalist	
2016 21st	Star Wars: Return of the Jedi: Beware the Power of the Dark Side! (2015)	Tom Angleberger	Marc Thompson	Listening Library/Penguin Random House Audio	Finalist	
2017 22nd	Star Wars: The Force Awakens (2015)	Alan Dean Foster	Marc Thompson	Penguin Random House Audio/Books on Tape	Winner	
2017 22nd	The Book of the Unnamed Midwife (2014)	Meg Elison	Angela Dawe	Brilliance Audio	Finalist	
2017 22nd	Crosstalk (2016)	Connie Willis	Mia Barron	Recorded Books	Finalist	
2017 22nd	The Dispatcher (2016)	John Scalzi	Zachary Quinto	Audible	Finalist	
2017 22nd	Sleeping Giants (2016)	Sylvain Neuvel	Andy Secombe, Eric Meyers, and full cast	Penguin Random House Audio/Books on Tape	Finalist	
2018 23rd	Provenance (2017)	Ann Leckie	Adjoa Andoh	Hachette Audio	Winner	
2018 23rd	Battlefront II: Inferno Squad (2017)	Christie Golden	Janina Gavankar	Random House Audio	Finalist	
2018 23rd	New York 2140 (2017)	Kim Stanley Robinson	Suzanne Toren, Robin Miles, and full cast	Hachette Audio	Finalist	
2018 23rd	The Stone Sky (2017)	N. K. Jemisin	Robin Miles	Hachette Audio	Finalist	
2018 23rd	The X Files: Cold Cases (2017)	Joe Harris, Chris Carter, and Dirk Maggs	David Duchovny, Gillian Anderson, and full cast	Audible	Finalist	
2019 24th	The Hitchhiker's Guide to the Galaxy: Tertiary Phase (2004)	Douglas Adams	Simon Jones, Geoffrey McGivern, and full cast	BBC Audiobooks America	Winner	
2019 24th	Artemis (2017)	Andy Weir	Rosario Dawson	Audible	Finalist	
2019 24th	Black Star Renegades (2018)	Michael Moreci	Dan Bittner	Macmillan Audio	Finalist	
2019 24th	Head On (2018)	John Scalzi	Wil Wheaton	Audible	Finalist	
2019 24th	Planetside (2018)	Michael Mammay	R. C. Bray	HarperAudio	Finalist	

=== 2020s ===
Year	Audiobook	Author(s)	Narrator(s)	Publisher	Result	Ref.
2020 25th	Emergency Skin (2019)	N. K. Jemisin	Jason Isaacs	Brilliance Audio	Winner	
2020 25th	Hollow Kingdom (2019)	Kira Jane Buxton	Robert Petkoff	Hachette Audio	Finalist	
2020 25th	The Last Astronaut (2019)	David Wellington	Megan Tusing	Hachette Audio	Finalist	
2020 25th	The Lesson (2019)	Cadwell Turnbull	Ron Butler and Janina Edwards	Blackstone Audio	Finalist	
2020 25th	Permafrost (2019)	Alastair Reynolds	Natasha Soudek	Macmillan Audio	Finalist	
2021 26th	The Deep (2019)	Rivers Solomon, Daveed Diggs, William Hutston, and Jonathan Snipes	Daveed Diggs	Simon & Schuster Audio	Winner	
2021 26th	Aliens: Phalanx (2020)	Scott Sigler	Bronson Pinchot	Blackstone Audio	Finalist	
2021 26th	Axiom's End (2020)	Lindsay Ellis	Stephanie Willis and Abigail Thorn	Macmillan Audio	Finalist	
2021 26th	Heaven's River (2020)	Dennis E. Taylor	Ray Porter	Audible Originals	Finalist	
2021 26th	Ruins of the Galaxy (2018)	J. N. Chaney and Christopher Hopper	R. C. Bray	Podium Audio	Finalist	
2021 26th	Thrawn Ascendancy: Chaos Rising (2020)	Timothy Zahn	Marc Thompson	Penguin Random House Audio	Finalist	
2022 27th	Project Hail Mary (2021)	Andy Weir	Ray Porter	Audible Studios	Winner	
2022 27th	Day Zero (2021)	C. Robert Cargill	Vikas Adam	HarperAudio	Finalist	
2022 27th	Orphan Wars	Scott Moon and J.N. Chaney	Luke Daniels	Podium Audio	Finalist	
2022 27th	Pastel Pink	Nikki Minty	Khristine Hvam, James Patrick Cronin, and Jodie Harris	Nikki Minty	Finalist	
2022 27th	Ready Player Two (2020)	Ernest Cline	Wil Wheaton	Penguin Random House Audio	Finalist	
2023 28th	Intergalactic Exterminators, Inc.	Ash Bishop	Scott Brick and Suzanne Elise Freeman	CamCat Books	Winner	
2023 28th	How High We Go in the Dark	Sequoia Nagamatsu	Julia Whelan, Brian Nishii, Keisuke Hoashi, MacLeod Andrews, Jeanne Sakata, Greg Watanabe, Kurt Kanazawa, Matthew Bridges, Kotaro Watanabe, Brianna Ishibashi, Joe Knezevich, Micky Shiloah, Stephanie Komure, and Jason Culp	HarperAudio	Finalist	
2023 28th	No Kindness Too Soon	Sylvain Neuvel	Melanie Nicholls-King, Deepti Gupta, Neil Hellegers, Gabriel Vaughan, Kathy Searle, Imani Jade Powers, Nicolette Chin, Gopal Divan, and Garrett Michael Brown	Audible Originals	Finalist	
2023 28th	NOOR	Nnedi Okorafor	Délé Ogundiran	Tantor Audio	Finalist	
2023 28th	YMIR	Rich Larson	Alan Medcroft	Hachette Audio	Finalist	
2024 29th	Cassandra in Reverse	Holly Smale	Kristin Atherton	HarperAudio	Winner	
2024 29th	The World We Make	N. K. Jemisin	Robin Miles	Hachette Audio	Finalist	
2024 29th	The Deep Sky	Yume Kitasei	Skaer Sarah	Macmillan Audio	Finalist	
2024 29th	Dual Memory	Sue Burke	Santana André	Dreamscape Media	Finalist	
2024 29th	Wool	Hugh Howey	Ballerini Edoardo	Blackstone Publishing	Finalist	
2025 30th	The Book of Doors	Gareth Brown	Miranda Raison	HarperAudio	Winner	
2025 30th	Frontier	Grace Curtis	Aven Shore	Tantor Audio	Finalist	
2025 30th	Lake of Souls	Ann Leckie	Adjoa Andoh	Hachette Audio	Finalist	
2025 30th	Mal Goes to War	Edward Ashton	John Pirhalla and Katharine Chin	Macmillan Audio	Finalist	
2025 30th	System Collapse	Martha Wells	Kevin R. Free	Recorded Books, Inc.	Finalist	
2026 31st	Simultaneous	Eric Heisserer	Ray Porter, Marin Ireland, and Stephanie Sheh	Macmillan Audio	Winner	
2026 31st	All-Star Superman (2005–2008)	Grant Morrison and Frank Quitely, adapted by Meghan Fitzmartin	Marc Thompson, Kristen Sieh, Christopher Smith, Jessica Almasy, Matthew Amendt, Pete Bradbury, Scott Brick, Brennan Brown, Will Damron, Sean Kenin Elias-Reyes, Lauren Ezzo, Robert Fass, James Fouhey, Todd Haberkorn, Neil Hellegers, Dominic Hoffman, Đavid Lee Huỳnh, Joshua Kane, January LaVoy, Saskia Maarleveld, Brandon McInnis, Ray Porter, Salli Saffioti, Catherine Taber, and Oliver Wyman	Penguin Random House Audio	Finalist	
2026 31st	The Dark Forest (2008)	Cixin Liu, translated by Joel Martinsen	Jess Hong	Macmillan Audio	Finalist	
2026 31st	Flybot	Dennis E. Taylor	Ray Porter	Audible Originals	Finalist	
2026 31st	New Arcadia: Judgment Day	Eric Jason Martin	Eric Jason Martin, Robert Patrick, Matthew Mercer, Erika Ishii, Sam Riegel, Dave Fennoy, Marin Ireland, January LaVoy, James Urbaniak, Emily Woo Zeller, and a full cast	Sound Off Productions	Finalist	
2026 31st	The Two Lies of Faven Sythe	Megan E. O'Keefe	Zara Ramm	Hachette Audio	Finalist	
