= The Threshold Universe =

Ongoing book series written by Peter Clines

The Threshold Universe is an ongoing book series written by Peter Clines and begins with the novel 14 published in 2012. The other books in the series included The Fold (2015), Dead Moon (2018), and Terminus (2020). Although 14 and The Fold were published both as paperbacks and audio books, Dead Moon began as an Audible exclusive and after its initial run on Audible, it was published as an e-book while Terminus has been published exclusively as an Audible Original. All of the audio books for The Threshold Universe have been published through Audible and all are read by Ray Porter.

== Books ==
=== 14 ===
This is chronologically the first book in the series and was published in 2012 by Permuted Platinum and Audible Inc. as an audio book.

This follows Nate Tucker, who lives in Los Angeles, is stuck doing data entry and doesn't know what he's doing with his life. Just as he needs to move out of his old place, Nate hears of an apartment building with extremely low rent at an after work get-together and once Nate signs his lease for 565 dollars a month (including utilities) at the Kavach building, the mysteries of the old Los Angeles brownstone begin to unravel. Nate discovers that his building manager Oscar Rommel is reluctant to tell the truth about the building along with bright green seven-legged cockroaches that skitter around his building, his kitchen light is a black light no matter what kind of bulb he puts in and the four massive padlocks that are on apartment 14.

In addition to discovering the visible oddities of his building, Nate also encounters his neighbors Veek, Roger, Xela, Clive and Debbie and the newly moved-in Tim where they slowly unveil the deeper hidden secrets of the Kavach building. Over the course of the novel, the group, with Nate at the lead, discover that the building is not hooked into the Los Angeles power grid and instead pulls its power from a series of Westinghouse generators that draw from a fault line almost a mile underneath Kavach. They also discover writing on all of the walls of various apartments that includes scientific formulas, population growth algorithms and a letter from one of the men who created Kavach, Aleksander Koturovich, which helps answer the mysterious questions about the nature of the building. Aleksander Koturovic along with Whipple Van Buren Phillips and Nikola Tesla helped finance and construct the Kavach building as a protective shield against a race of alpha predators from another dimension that would be able to appear in their dimension once the population reached a critical point. Nate and the others also discover that beneath the paneling of Clive and Debbie's apartment is a series of knobs and switches that are meant to act as the controls for the building.

As Nate and the others break into apartment 14 to discover the last of the mysteries of their building, they realize that a pocket of space is within the apartment and acts as a counterbalance for the power of the building. The apex of the story occurs when Andrew, another resident of Kavach who is also a member of the Family of the Red Death (a doomsday cult that worships Koturovic's alpha predators), deactivates the machine, causing it to slip into the dimension with the alpha predators. Nate and the other residents of the Kavach building hurriedly work to change the switches and dials on the control panel in Clive and Debbie's apartment. Although the building manager Oskar gets captured by a flying alpha predators, they fail to get him back and in the process Tim dies. Nate and the other residents of Kavach, save for Andrew, Oskar and Tim, Xela fixes the control room and returns the machine to Los Angeles. The novel ends with Nate becoming the new building manager of Kavach.

=== The Fold ===
This is chronologically the second book in the series and was published in 2015 by Crown Publishers and Audible Inc. as an audio book.

The Second book in the series follows Leland "Mike" Erikson as the main character.

Mike, though a high school English teacher in Maine, has an eidetic memory and can recall anything he's ever seen. His friend Reggie Magnus, who works for the Defense Advanced Research Projects Agency (DARPA), believes he is putting his talent and genius to waste as a high school teacher and employs him on a secret project titled the Albuquerque Door just outside of San Diego, California. Mike is sent simply as an observer for the project, to assure that everything is working properly before they announce it and unveil it to the public.

While staying on the site of the project, Mike encounters Dr. Arthur Cross, Jamie Parker, Sasha, Olaf Johansson, Bob Hitchcock and Neil who all treat him with mild hostility because they are afraid that he is going to shut the project down. When he observes it, Mike learns that the Albuquerque Door is not merely teleportation, but folding space and punching a hole through it in order to travel long distances in a matter of seconds. At the site, they use it to travel across the compound.

While observing Bob walk through the Door, he comes out the other side hardly resembling the person he was before he walked through the Door, he came out the other side covered in blood with gashes and bruises all over his body. After his death, Mike went to the autopsy of Bob where he was told that he died of blunt force trauma, but was also told by the medical examiner that he also had cancer of all kinds as well as many different injuries that dated back more than a year. Mike soon figures out that the Albuquerque Door is not merely a puncture through space-time that allows one to travel large distances quickly, it is a portal to other dimensions and every time someone walks through the Door, that same person from a different dimension is pushed out. Mike also learns that none of the people working on the Albuquerque Door actually know how it works and instead got their math from Aleksander Koturovic and plugged it into the machine and it worked. The climax of the novel begins when Mike and the others realize that the Door hasn't been turned off and that the overuse of it has actually ripped a hole open into another dimension and creatures from the other dimension start wreaking havoc on the Albuquerque Door and buildings surrounding it.

Mike, with the help of the Marines, manages to blow up the rings of the Door with a series of C4 charges, which ends up shutting off the door, but not destroying the rings. The novel ends with Mike meeting Veek and Roger and being offered a position to work with them at Kavach.

=== Dead Moon ===
Although this is the third book in the series, chronologically it takes place after Terminus. It was published in 2019 by Audible Originals, LLC.

=== Terminus ===
Though this is the fourth book published, the events of this novel take place after The Fold. It was published in 2020 by Audible Original, LLC.

== Characters ==
- Nate Tucker- the main character of 14, a man in his 30s that struggled to find purpose in his life until he uncovered the mysteries of his apartment building.
- Malavika "Veek" Vishwanath- an Indian woman who ends up as Nate's significant other, she is also a black hat hacker and is one of the main characters in Terminus.
- Leland "Mike" Erikson- The main character in The Fold, he has an eidetic memory which allows him to instantly recall anything he's ever seen.
- Anne- Played minor characters in both 14 (as a temp at Nate's work) and in The Fold (as a receptionist) but is the major antagonist in Terminus.

== Reception ==
For the novel 14, NerdsonEarth.com reviewer Joseph Robinson praised the work for the mysterious build-up that occurred during the novel as it was something that defied his own expectations for the piece. Robinson also comments that the characters in the novel are not completely fleshed out and only really make decisions that further the plot of the book. Joseph Robinson of NerdsonEarth.com also reviewed Peter Clines’ second novel, The Fold, and he complimented the pacing of the novel and praised it for being true science fiction to its core. For this novel, he also commented about the characters and their purpose being only to push the plot forward. In SFFWorld.com's review for The Fold, Mark Yon applauded Clines’ novel for being part of classic science fiction. Yon also commends the story for its pacing and build-up of mystery throughout the novel to the apex of the plot and the naturalness of the characters.

== Origins ==
In the afterword to 14, Peter Clines reveals that the debut of 14 started as an advanced readers edition copy that Clines sold at the 2012 Crypticon in Seattle prior to the actual publication of the book. In his afterword to The Fold, Clines discussed the origins to the main story and how it began as a short story that he wrote in college called “The Albuquerque Door”. He wrote that he filed it away until 2006 where he worked with it until he came up with a 30,000 word piece titled Mouth, then filed it away again to work on his Ex-Heroes Series. The story finally came back to life when he wanted to write a sequel to his novel 14 and realized that a lot of the ideas matched up with what 14 was doing. Clines also comments on his own article on SFFWorld.com about the nature of the science fiction featured in The Fold. He talked about the science fiction of the piece being part of the trope of teleportation, something that most everyone is familiar with and then adding an unexpected mystery into the trope of teleportation going wrong. In a lengthy interview done by Great Scott on GeekNewsNetwork.com (GNN), Peter Clines talks about the origins of himself as a writer but also about how his third book Dead Moon came to be. Clines commented that the idea for the book originally came about while he was working on his Ex-Heroes series (which happens to deal with a zombie apocalypse) in 2006, but the idea was put aside to better work on his series. In this interview Clines stated that it was harder to put together all the elements of the novel in a way that worked but finally got it together for its 2018 release on Audible.
