= Day Zero =

Day Zero may refer to:

- 0th day
- Day Zero (2007 film), an American drama
- Day Zero (2020 film), an Iranian action thriller
- Day Zero (2022 film), a Philippine action zombie film
- Day Zero: The Series, a 2011–2014 American post-apocalyptic drama television series
- Day Zero (novel), a 2021 science fiction novel by C. Robert Cargill
- "Day Zero", 19 June 2019, during the 2019 Chennai Water Crisis, when all four reservoirs supplying the city ran dry
- "Day Zero", during the 2010s Cape Town water crisis, a reference to the day water restrictions would be implemented

== See also ==
- Year zero (disambiguation)
- Zero day (disambiguation)
