= City of Darkness =

City of Darkness may refer to:

- City of Darkness (novel), a 1976 dystopian young adult novel by Ben Bova
- an alternative name for Kowloon Walled City
