= A March into Darkness =

2007 novel by Robert Newcomb

- First edition
- Author: Robert Newcomb
- Language: English
- Series: The Destinies of Blood and Stone
- Genre: fantasy
- Publisher: Del Rey
- Publication date: 2007
- Publication place: United States
- Media type: Print (hardcover)
- Preceded by: Savage Messiah
- Followed by: Rise of the Blood Royal

A March into Darkness is a novel written by American author Robert Newcomb. It is the second in The Destinies of Blood and Stone series.

== Plot introduction ==
The story tells of Prince Tristan, as he is summoned by the Heretics to join them beyond the Tolenka Mountains. It is there they promise to help him discover his destiny. To help spur the prince along they send Xanthus, a binary being (half-man, half darkling), to torture the citizens of Eutracia until Tristan agrees to go.

Meanwhile, Serena plots her revenge against those who worship the Vigors. She personally plans to kill Tristan for the death of her husband Wulfgar and their stillborn daughter, Clarice. With the help of the Heretics, to whom she is now able to commune with, Serena sets a plan into motion that will rock the Conclave to its very core.
