= Domed city =

Large urban area enclosed within a dome

A domed city is a hypothetical structure that encloses a large urban area under a single roof. In most descriptions, the dome is airtight and pressurized, creating a habitat that can be controlled for air temperature, composition and quality, typically due to an external atmosphere (or lack thereof) that is inimical to habitation for one or more reasons. Domed cities have been a fixture of science fiction and futurology since the early 20th century, offer inspirations for potential utopias and may be situated on Earth, a moon or other planet.

== Origin ==
The social reformer Charles Fourier proposed in 1808 that an ideal city must be connected by glass galleries and the botanist J. C. Loudon wrote in his An Encyclopedia of Gardening (1822) about whole cities covered by a giant glass roof

In Northern countries, civilized man could not exist without glass; and if coal is not discovered in these countries, say in Russia, the most economical mode of procuring temperature will be at once covering whole towns with immense teguments of glass, and heating by steam or otherwise, the enclosed air common to all inhabitants.

== In fiction ==
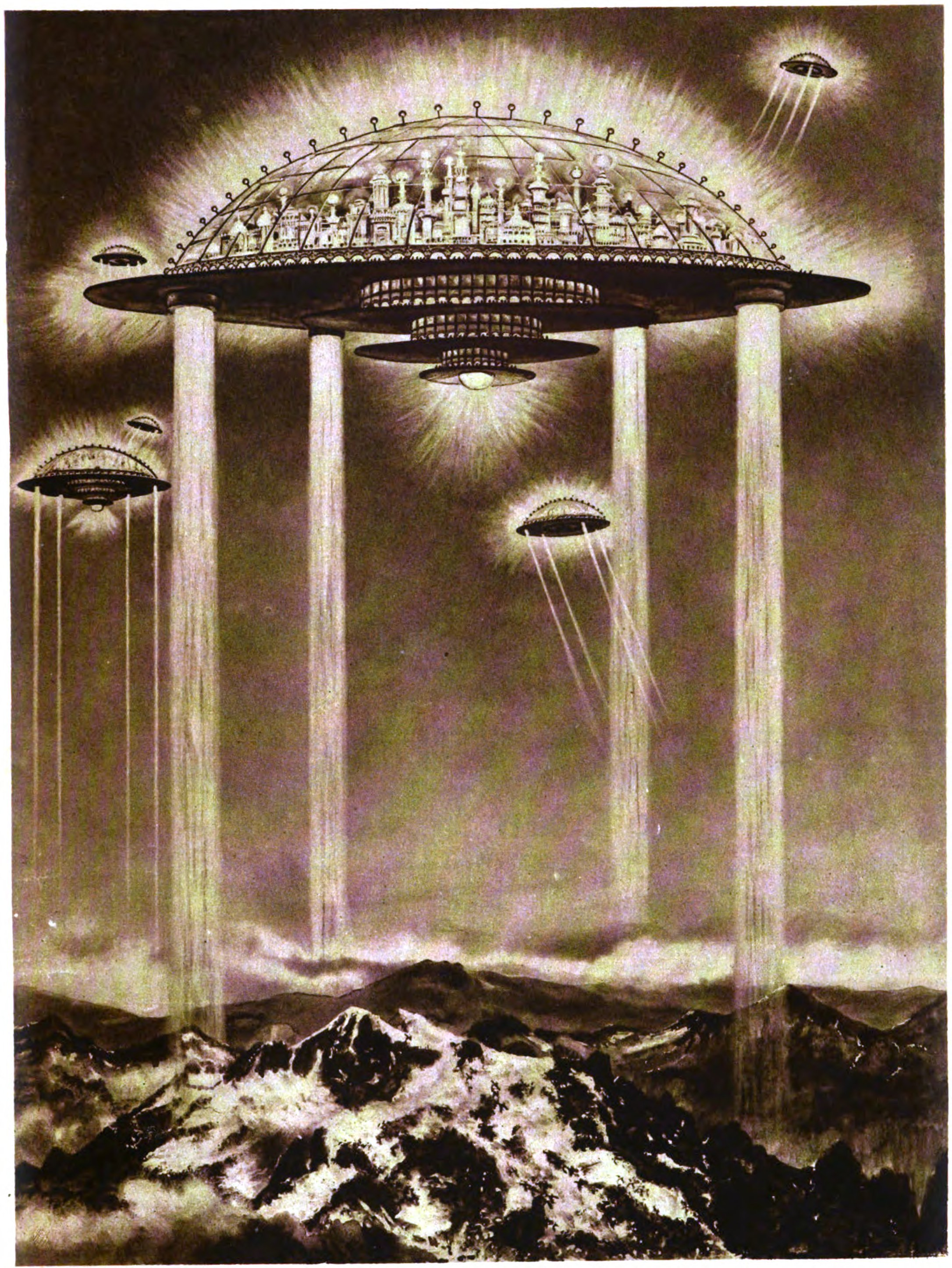
Domed cities in Hugo Gernsback's 1922 essay 10,000 Years Hence

One of the earliest examples of domed cities in fiction is the city of Vitrea in the anonymously written utopian novel Mrs. Maberly (1836). Domed cities appear frequently in underwater environments. In Robert Ellis Dudgeon's novel Colymbia (1873), glass domes are used for underwater conversation. In William Delisle Hay's novel Three Hundred Years Hence (1881), whole cities are covered by domes beneath the sea. Survivors of Atlantis are found living in an underwater glass-domed city in André Laurie's novel Atlantis (1895). The same idea is found later in David M. Parry's The Scarlet Empire (1906) and Stanton A Coblentz's The Sunken World (1928). In William Gibson's Sprawl trilogy, the namesake of the series is a massive supercity in the USA, stretching from Boston to Atlanta and housed in a series of geodesic domes.

Authors used domed cities in response to many problems, sometimes to the benefit of the people living in them and sometimes not. The problems of air pollution and other environmental destruction are a common motive, particularly in stories of the middle to late 20th century, such as the Pure trilogy of books by Julianna Baggott. In some works, the domed city represents the last stand of a human race that is either dead or dying. The 1976 film Logan's Run shows both of these themes. The characters have a comfortable life within a domed city, but the city also serves to control the populace and to ensure that humanity never again outgrows its means.

The domed city in fiction has been interpreted as a symbolic womb that both nourishes and protects humanity. Where other science fiction stories emphasize the vast expanse of the universe, the domed city places limits on its inhabitants, with the subtext that chaos will ensue if they interact with the world outside.

In some works cities are getting "domed" to quarantine its inhabitants.

== Engineering proposals ==
During the 1960s and 1970s, the domed city concept was widely discussed outside the confines of science fiction. In 1960, visionary engineer Buckminster Fuller described the Dome over Manhattan, a 3 km geodesic dome spanning Midtown Manhattan that would regulate weather and reduce air pollution. A domed city was proposed in 1979 for Winooski, Vermont and in 2010 for Houston.

Seward's Success, Alaska, was a domed city proposed in 1968 and designed to hold over 40,000 people along with commercial, recreational and office space. Intended to capitalize on the economic boom following the discovery of oil in northern Alaska, the project was canceled in 1972 due to delays in constructing the Trans-Alaska Pipeline.

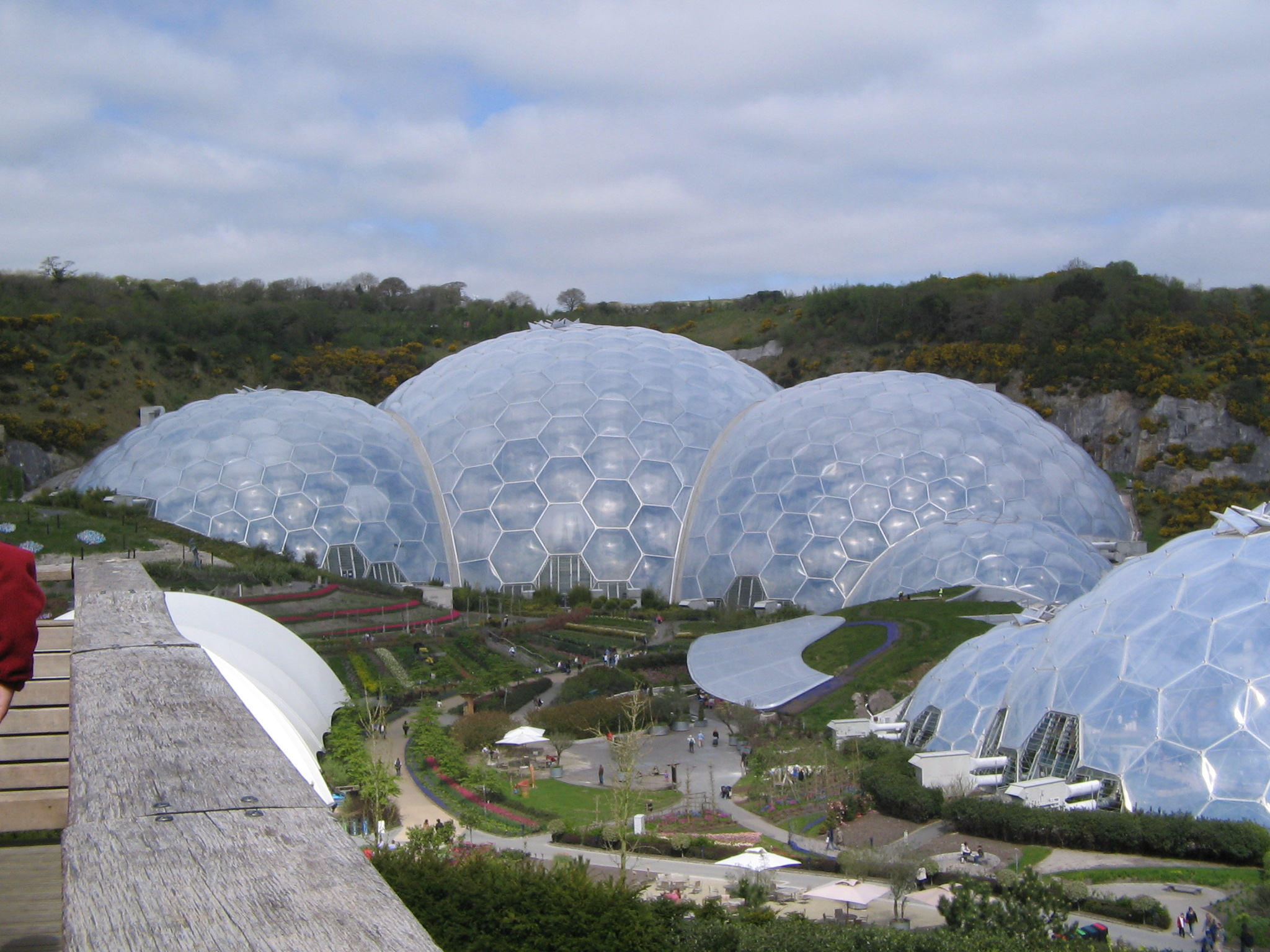
The Eden Project established in 2000 in Cornwall, UK. A modern botanical garden exploring the theme of sustainability

In order to test whether an artificial closed ecological system was feasible, Biosphere 2 (a complex of interconnected domes and glass pyramids) was constructed in the late 1980s. Its original experiment housed eight people and remains the largest such system attempted to date.

In 2010, a domed city known as Eco-city 2020 of 100,000 was proposed for the Mir mine in Siberia. In 2014, the ruler of Dubai announced plans for a climate-controlled domed city, named the Mall of the World, covering an area of 48 million square feet (4.5 square kilometers), but as of 2016, the project has been redesigned without the dome.

== See also ==
- Air-supported structure – Pressurized building-size envelope
- Arcology – Type of design principles for human habitats
- Dyson sphere – Hypothetical megastructure around a star
- Force field (technology) – Fictional technology or superpower
- Geodesic dome – Spherical shell structure based on a geodesic polyhedron
- IBTS Greenhouse – Egyptian desalination project
- Mars analog habitat – Research simulating the environment on Mars
- O'Neill cylinder – Space settlement concept
- Symbolism of domes
- Smog tower – Urban large-scale air purifier
- Closed ecosystems:
  - Biosphere 2 – Closed ecological research center in Arizona
  - BIOS-3 – Closed ecosystem at the Institute of Biophysics in Krasnoyarsk, Russia
  - MELiSSA – European Space Agency led consortium developing life support systems for space missions
  - Yuegong-1 – Chinese research facility for developing a Moon base
