= Zero day =

Zero day(s) may refer to:

- 0th day

== Computing ==
- Zero-day (computing), a software vulnerability unknown to those who should be interested in its mitigation
- Zero Day Initiative, an international software vulnerability initiative
- Zero-day warez, copyrighted software that is cracked on the same day it is released

== Film and television ==
- Zero Day (film), a 2002 American film by Ben Coccio
- Zero Days, a 2016 American documentary film
- Zero Day (American TV series), a 2025 American political thriller series
- Zero Day (Taiwanese TV series), a 2025 Taiwanese speculative fiction series
- "Zero Day" (My Adventures with Superman), a 2023 TV episode
- "Zero Day" (Person of Interest), a 2013 TV episode

== Literature ==
- Zero Day (novel), a 2011 thriller novel by David Baldacci
- Zero Day, a 2011 novel by Mark Russinovich
- Zero Days, a 2023 novel by Ruth Ware

== Music ==
- Zero Day (album) or the title song, by MC Frontalot, 2010
- Zero Days (album) or the title song, by Prong, 2017

== See also ==
- D-Day (military term)
- Day Zero (disambiguation)
- Zero Hour (disambiguation)
