= Savage Messiah (novel) =

2005 novel by Robert Newcomb

- Author: Robert Newcomb
- Series: The Destinies of Blood and Stone
- Genre: Novel
- Publisher: Del Rey
- Publication date: 2005
- Publication place: United States
- ISBN: 0-34-547707-3
- OCLC: 656139452
- Preceded by: The Scrolls of the Ancients
- Followed by: A March into Darkness

Savage Messiah is a novel written by American author Robert Newcomb published by Del Rey Books in 2005. It is the first book in The Destinies of Blood and Stone, a book series.

== Plot ==
The story begins with the revelation that Wulfgar, half brother to both Tristan and Shailiha, lives but is horribly scarred. He returns to the Citadel, where his wife and unborn child await, and he can plan his revenge. Meanwhile, the Orb of the Vigors is damaged and is literally burning a path across Eutracia. Tristan and his Conclave set out to stop the Orb and Wulfgar.
