= Ray Porter =

American actor and audiobook narrator

- Occupations: Actor; Audiobook narrator
- Years active: 1990–present

Ray Porter is an American actor and audiobook narrator known for his narrations of Dennis E. Taylor’s Bobiverse, Jack Carr’s The Terminal List, and Andy Weir’s Project Hail Mary, which won the 2022 Audie Award for Audiobook of the Year. He is also known for portraying the DC Comics villain Darkseid in Zack Snyder's Justice League and some voice acting work for The Scarecrow, The Path of Atticus: Gods and Monsters and The Little Engine That Could.

== Career ==
After narrating audiobooks and appearing in several television series, he gained attention when he was cast as Darkseid in the 2017 film Justice League, becoming the first actor to have been cast as the character in a live-action feature film. However, Darkseid did not appear in the theatrical cut, meaning Zack Snyder's Justice League marked the character's first appearance in a live-action film. Porter played Darkseid through the use of motion capture and "went through a few different vocal gymnastics trying to figure out the voice". In February 2022, he was cast in Snyder's film Rebel Moon.

Porter has also been recognized for his work narrating the Project Hail Mary audiobook with an appearance at Hall H at San Diego Comic-Con with the author of the book and cast from the movie.

== Filmography ==
=== Film ===
| Year | Title | Role | Notes |
|---|---|---|---|
| 2000 | Almost Famous | Roadie Mick | |
| 2000 | The Scarecrow | Count Grisham (voice) | Voice, direct-to-video |
| 2003 | Sin | Jeff | |
| 2009 | The Path of Atticus: Gods and Monsters | Typhon | Voice, direct-to-video |
| 2010 | The Runaways | Band Member | |
| 2011 | The Little Engine That Could | Nightmare Train | Voice, direct-to-video |
| 2012 | Argo | First A.D. | |
| 2021 | Zack Snyder's Justice League | Darkseid | Voice and motion capture |
| 2023 | Rebel Moon: Part One – A Child of Fire | Hickman | |
| 2026 | Project Hail Mary | Rocky (alternative voice) | Cameo |

=== Television ===
| Year | Title | Role | Notes |
|---|---|---|---|
| 1998 | Murphy Brown | Young Man | Episode: "The Last Temptation of Murphy" |
| 1999–2001 | ER | Sam Broder | 3 episodes |
| 2001 | Frasier | Dwayne | Episode: "The Show Must Go Off" |
| 2002 | Will & Grace | Dad | Episode: "He Shoots, They Snore" |
| 2003 | In-Laws | Jeff | Episode: "Two Rooms" |
| 2003 | Dragnet | | Episode: "Well Endowed" |
| 2003–2004 | Teen Titans | Additional characters | Voice, 16 episodes |
| 2005 | The Suite Life of Zack and Cody | Derrick | Episode: "Dad's Back" |
| 2005 | Bible Battles | Abraham | Documentary |
| 2006 | Medium | Putt Putt Golf Man | Episode: "Four Dreams" |
| 2007 | Last Stand of the 300 | Priest of the Oracle | Documentary |
| 2008 | Monk | Dale "the Whale" Biederbeck | Episode: "Mr. Monk Is on the Run" |
| 2009 | It's Always Sunny in Philadelphia | Gerry | Episode: "The Gang Exploits the Mortgage Crisis" |
| 2009 | Southland | Roy | Episode: "Two Gangs" |
| 2009 | CSI: Crime Scene Investigation | Carl Van Goe | Episode: "The Gone Dead" |
| 2009 | The Closer | Adrian Beck | Episode: "Strike Three" |
| 2010 | Justified | Hestler Jones | 3 episodes |
| 2010 | Sons of Anarchy | Head Red | Episode: "Home" |
| 2012 | Curious George | Howlin' Hal | Voice, episode: "DJ George/Curious George Paints the Town" |
| 2014 | Shameless | Lip's Boss | Episodes: "Like Father, Like Daughter" and "Hope Springs Paternal" |
| 2014 | The Mentalist | Wick Ammon | Episode: "Nothing But Blue Skies" |
| 2018 | Modern Family | Lazlo | Episode: "In Your Head" |
| 2019 | The Kids Are Alright | Ernie | Episode: "Nine Birthdays" |
| 2022 | Naomi | Brutus | Episode: "Who Am I?" |
| 2024 | Twilight of the Gods | Bolverkr | Voice, 3 episodes |
| TBA | Army of the Dead: Lost Vegas | TBA | Voice |

=== Video games ===
| Year | Title | Voice role | Notes |
|---|---|---|---|
| 1996 | Clandestiny | Magnus Og / Vicar / Jester / Doll | |
| 1998 | Tender Loving Care | Radio Voice #1 | |
| 2010 | BioShock 2 | Mark Meltzer | |
| 2010 | Medal of Honor | Gunfighter 06 | |
| 2021 | The Elder Scrolls Online | Rynkyus | |
| 2026 | Grand Theft Auto VI | The Local Population | |

=== Audiobook ===
| Year | Title | Voice role | Notes |
|---|---|---|---|
| 2008 | And the Hippos Were Boiled in Their Tanks | All characters | |
| 2008 | Hell House | All characters | |
| 2009 | The Amityville Horror | All characters | |
| 2010 | Patient Zero | All characters | Joe Ledger, Book 1 |
| 2011 | The Four Hour Workweek | Timothy Ferris | |
| 2012 | 14 | All characters | |
| 2014 | Half-Off Ragnarok | All characters (except Verity Price) | InCryptid, Book 3 |
| 2015 | Pocket Apocalypse | All characters | InCryptid, Book 4 |
| 2016 | We are Legion (We are Bob) | All characters | Bobiverse, Book 1 |
| 2017 | For We Are Many | All characters | Bobiverse, Book 2 |
| 2017 | All These Worlds | All characters | Bobiverse, Book 3 |
| 2017 | Paradox Bound | All characters | |
| 2018 | The Terminal List | All characters | The Terminal List Series, Book 1 |
| 2019 | True Believer | All characters | The Terminal List Series, Book 2 |
| 2020 | Savage Son | All characters | The Terminal List Series, Book 3 |
| 2020 | The Sandman | Gilbert / Martin Tenbones / Wesley Dodds / Hector Hall / Beelzebub / Security Guard / Richard Burbage / Griffin / Mark / Mulligan | |
| 2021 | Heaven's River | All characters | Bobiverse, Book 4 |
| 2021 | The Devil's Hand | All characters | The Terminal List Series, Book 4 |
| 2021 | Project Hail Mary | All characters | |
| 2021 | The Bridge Sequence Lost Contact | All characters | |
| 2021 | The Apollo Murders | All characters | Apollo Murders, Book 1 |
| 2021 | The Bridge Sequence Lost Time | All characters | |
| 2022 | Roadkill | All characters | |
| 2022 | In The Blood | All characters | The Terminal List Series, Book 5 |
| 2023 | Only the Dead | All characters | The Terminal List Series, Book 6 |
| 2023 | The Defector | All characters | Apollo Murders, Book 2 |
| 2023 | The Crypt: Shakedown | All Characters | The Crypt Series, Book 1 |
| 2024 | Not Till We Are Lost | All characters | Bobiverse, Book 5 |
| 2025 | Flybot | All characters | |
| 2025 | Final Orbit | All characters | Apollo Murders, Book 3 |
| 2025 | All Star Superman | Jor-El | |
| 2026 | The Crypt: Voidstrike | All Characters | The Crypt Series, Book 2 |
| 2026 | The Infinite Extent | All Characters | Bobiverse, Book 6 |

== Awards and nominations ==
| Year | Award | Work | Result |
|---|---|---|---|
| 2011 | Audie Award for Business and Personal Development | The 4-Hour Workweek | Nominated |
| 2013 | Audie Award for Science Fiction | 14 | Nominated |
| 2014 | Audie Award for Science Fiction | Extinction Machine | Nominated |
| 2015 | Audible Narrator of the Year | N/A | Won |
| 2017 | Audie Award for Short Stories or Collections | The Collected Stories of Arthur C. Clarke | Nominated |
| 2018 | Audie Award for Paranormal | Nights of the Living Dead: An Anthology | Nominated |
| 2019 | Audie Award for Thriller or Suspense | The Terminal List | Nominated |
| 2021 | Audie Award for Science Fiction | Heaven's River | Nominated |
| 2021 | Audie Award for Business and Personal Development | Tools of Titans: The Tactics, Routines, and Habits of Billionaires, Icons, and World-Class Performers | Nominated |
| 2022 | Audie Award for Science Fiction | Project Hail Mary | Won |
| 2022 | Audie Audiobook of the Year | Project Hail Mary | Won |
