= Pure (Baggott novel) =

2012 novel by Julianna Baggott

- First edition cover (US)
- Author: Julianna Baggott
- Genre: Dystopian fiction
- Publisher: Grand Central Publishing (US); Headline (UK)
- Publication date: February 8, 2012
- ISBN: 978-1-4555-0306-3 (US edition)

Pure is a dystopian novel by American poet Julianna Baggott, published in February 2012 by Grand Central Publishing in the US, and by Headline in the UK.

The first part of a trilogy, Pure tells the story of Pressia and her people, living in a post-apocalyptic world destroyed by nuclear bombs, and Partridge and his people who live inside The Dome, a giant bunker that spared people from the destruction. The people on the outside call the dome-dwellers "pures", untouched by radiation. The people inside the Dome call the outsiders "wretches", considering them less than human. The novel follows Pressia's and Partridge's stories separately, until they unexpectedly meet.

Baggott has written two sequels to Pure: 2013's Fuse and 2014's Burn.

== Adaptation ==
In 2013, 20th Century Fox acquired film rights, with Karen Rosenfelt as producer, and James Ponsoldt set to direct.
