= Zero Hour =

Zero Hour may refer to:

- Midnight, or 00:00
- Zero hour (1945), the capitulation of the Nazi government at midnight May 8, 1945
- Zero Hour (military designation), the scheduled time for the start of some event, especially a military operation

== Film, television and radio ==
- The Zero Hour (1939 film), an American film directed by Sidney Salkow
- Zero Hour (1944 film), a 1944 Canadian documentary film
- Zero Hour!, a 1957 film, later parodied as Airplane!
- Zero Hour (1977 film), a 1977 West German film directed by Edgar Reitz
- The Zero Hour (2010 film), a 2010 Venezuelan action film
- Zero Hour (2004 TV series), a 2004 documentary-style TV show retelling tragic man-made disasters
- Zero Hour (2013 TV series), a 2013 American conspiracy drama series
- The Zero Hour (Japanese radio series), a radio program broadcast by Japan in World War II
- The Zero Hour (U.S. radio series), a 1973–74 radio drama series hosted by Rod Serling

=== Episodes ===
- "Zero Hour! The Destruction of the Hidden Leaf Village Begins!", a 2004 episode of Naruto
- "Zero Hour" (Star Trek: Enterprise), a 2004 episode of Star Trek: Enterprise
- "Zero Hour" (Stargate SG-1), a 2004 episode of the science fiction television series Stargate SG-1
- "Zero Hour" (Star Wars Rebels)

== Literature ==
- Zero Hour: Crisis in Time!, a 1994 DC Comics comic book miniseries and crossover storyline
- Zero Hour, a 1997 financial espionage thriller by Joseph Finder
- Zero Hour (play), a 2006 play by Jim Brochu about the life of actor Zero Mostel
- "Zero Hour", a story told in the Galileo Simulator at the Christa McAuliffe Space Education Center
- "Zero Hour", a short story by Ray Bradbury appearing in The Illustrated Man
- "Zero Hour – Over the Top", a fictional populist manifesto by the demagogue Buzz Windrip in It Can't Happen Here
- Zero Hour (Grabenhorst novel), a 1928 autobiographical novel by Georg Grabenhorst
- Zero Hour (Cussler novel), a 2013 mystery novel by Clive Cussler
- Zero Hour (Bentley novel), a 2022 novel by Don Bentley, part of the Jack Ryan Jr. series

== Music ==
- Zero Hour (band), a progressive metal band
- Zero Hour (Eidolon album), 1996
- Zero Hour (Zero Hour album), 1999
- Zero Hour (Avengers album), 2003
- "Zero Hour", a song on Noir's 2005 soundtrack
- "Zero Hour", a song by 'Avengers' on 1979 album Zero Hour (Avengers album)
- "Zero Hour", a song by the Plimsouls on the 1981 album The Plimsouls
- "The Zero Hour", a song on Project One's 2008 album Project One: The Album
- Zero Hour Records, a New York City-based record label founded in 1990
- Tango: Zero Hour, a 1986 album by Ástor Piazzolla

== Video games ==
- Zero Hour (video game), a 2024 video game
- Command & Conquer: Generals – Zero Hour, a 2003 real-time strategy video game
- Duke Nukem: Zero Hour, a 1999 third-person shooter
- Zero Hour: America's Medic, a 2009 game designed to train and exercise first responders
- Modern Combat 4: Zero Hour, a 2012 first-person shooter for iOS
- Firewall: Zero Hour, a 2018 VR first-person shooter

== Hora Cero ==
"Hora Cero" is "Zero Hour" in Spanish. It may make reference to:

- Hora Cero, a comic book anthology from Argentina
- "Hora Zero", a song on Rodrigo y Gabriela's 2009 album 11:11

== Other uses ==
- Zero Hour (activist organization), a U.S. youth organization dedicated to climate change activism, co-directed by Jamie Margolin
- Zero Hour campaign (UK), the campaign for the Climate and Nature Bill in the UK Parliament

== See also ==
- Zero-hour contract
- One Hour to Zero, a 1976 film
- Zero day (disambiguation)
