= Dome over Manhattan =

1959 architectural proposal

The Dome over Manhattan was a 1959 proposal for a 3-kilometer-diameter geodesic domed city covering Midtown Manhattan by the architects Buckminster Fuller and Thomas C. Howard of Synergetics, Inc.

Fuller expanded on his earlier work designing geodesic domes and advocating for decreased use of resources, and made a variety of claims to support the "Dome Over Manhattan," such as that it would reduce energy usage in NYC to 20% of what it was in 1960.

The concept inspired the science fiction writer Ben Bova's story "Manhattan Dome" in the September 1968 issue of Amazing Stories, subsequently expanded into the 1976 novella City of Darkness. A Fuller dome over Manhattan also appeared in John Brunner's 1968 novel Stand on Zanzibar, as well as in Norman Spinrad's 1970 anticipation novel The Lost Continent.
