= City of Darkness (novel) =

1976 book by Ben Bova

- Author: Ben Bova
- Language: English
- Publisher: Charles Scribner's Sons
- Publication date: 1976
- Publication place: United States
- Media type: Print (hardcover)
- ISBN: 0-7653-4361-4

City of Darkness is a dystopian young adult novel by Ben Bova, first published in 1976 by Charles Scribner's Sons.

== Plot ==
The novel is set in a dystopian future. Glass domes have been erected over the major cities in the US, and eventually, some twenty years ago, the cities have been evacuated and closed, ostensibly because pollution and diseases have turned them into a health hazard. People live in sterile suburb-like settlements called tracts, each centered around a mall, offices where the residents work, and an underground railway station. A healthy lifestyle with diets, workout programs, and eight hours of sleep is enforced by authorities. Cars are electric; combustion engines are banned. Even the weather is controlled so that rain falls only during the nightly curfew.

Only three of the cities, among them New York, are temporarily reopened to visitors each summer, albeit with restrictions to counter health risks: stays are limited to two weeks, minors must be accompanied by a legal guardian, and all visitors must undergo decontamination (including a lung-cleansing machine and disposal of all clothes worn in the city) when leaving. Nonetheless, the cities are popular (yet expensive) destinations for party travelers, not least because of the “adult” fun found there: movie theaters showing real murder films (movie theaters do not exist outside, and graphic content on TV is severely restricted), or “bedicabs”, cabs in which prostitutes offer their services during the ride.

The protagonist, 16-year-old Ron Morgan, lives in one of the tracts in Vermont. He has just finished school and scored exceptionally well in his National Exams. Following an argument with his father about his career (Ron would like to go into science and technology, while his father insists he major in business), and being generally bored by life in the tracts, Ron decides to secretly leave for New York City, which he has visited with his father the summer before.

On his first day in New York, Ron meets a girl named Sylvia and is immediately attracted to her. To his surprise, she tells him she was born in New York City and lives there all year. The two are threatened by a youth named Dino, but Ron manages to defeat him. However, Dino intercepts Ron and beats him unconscious when he leaves his hotel room at night to look for Sylvia, whom he believes to be in danger.

Ron eventually finds himself inside a run-down building, which is the hiding place of the gang Sylvia and Dino are both part of. His ID, cash, credit card, and keys have been stolen from him, presumably by Dino. It is the last day before New York closes, but Ron cannot leave without his ID, as police would mistake him for a gang kid and jail him. Sylvia offers him a bottle of juice laced with a drug, causing Ron to pass out and miss the deadline. As he is forced to stay in the city until the next summer, Sylvia suggests he get accepted into their gang, called the Gramercy gang. Their leader, Al, is initially reluctant but agrees when he discovers Ron's ability to repair things. As resources are scarce, this is a much-needed skill that can even be sold to rival gangs as part of a ceasefire agreement.

Ron learns about the circumstances leading to the closure of the city and its residents: After the dome was built to contain pollution, conflicts and rife corruption led to a deterioration of the conditions in the city. When health authorities predicted that everybody in New York City would die within a year, residents started fleeing in masses and riots broke out. Whoever had not left the city was presumed dead, including some 2,000 people still living there. Being essentially illegal residents, they cannot get regular jobs or receive social welfare and rely on petty crime or black market trade to survive.

The population now consists of three major groups: there are several white gangs like the Gramercy gang in the city, each occupying a different territory. Police leave with the tourists when the city closes, and the gangs rule the city. Until a ceasefire agreement was recently reached, violent attacks between them were common, usually to get food, money, or other scarce resources, or just to take revenge for a past attack. Presumably because of that, hardly anyone in the gangs lives past their twenties. Besides, there is a “super-gang”, called the Muslims, in the northern part of the city. Despite the name of the gang, many of its members are indeed Latinos or black but not actually Muslims. Being united rather than split up into many rival gangs, they are somewhat better off, and some Muslims live past age 30. Beyond the gangs, there is also the black market, the only place where older people are found.

Ron befriends Dewey, a marketeer at the black market from whom he occasionally needs to purchase tools and spare parts. Dewey offers Ron shelter as the Muslims appear at the black market and later clash with some white gangs. Although the Gramercy gang has been spared, Dino wants to retaliate against the Muslims but most of the other gang members, including Al, are against it. Dino leaves the gang in anger, but not without beating up Sylvia after she refuses to come with him.

As winter approaches and food and money get scarce, the white gangs begin attacking each other again. One night the Chelsea gang, with the help of Dino, mounts a surprise attack on the Gramercy headquarters. The gang's headquarters are looted and burned out. Al is among the victims of the attack, and Dino claims Sylvia as his girl. Ron is captured but is soon freed by the Muslims, who have heard from Dewey that Ron has skills they need. While doing repairs for the Muslims and training some of their members, Ron learns that Timmy Jim, their leader, plans to unite all the gangs in New York, whites and Muslims, and attack the tracts outside in some five years.

One spring day Sylvia appears, revealing that Dino is dead and returning Ron the keys, credit card, and ID that Dino had taken from him. Ron begins to realize that there is no way for him to take Sylvia out of the city with him, which he had planned to do from the beginning.

After the city has reopened, Ron manages to escape and checks into a hotel room to take a bath and get new clothes. Timmy Jim finds him and tries to hold him back, but Ron faces him with the decision to kill him or let him go, as he has repaid his debt to Timmy Jim for saving him from the Chelsea gang by training about a hundred young Muslims. Timmy Jim reveals to Ron that the real reason for evacuating New York was to get rid of non-white poverty: whites were allowed out, whether rich or poor, but non-whites were forcefully prevented from leaving and eventually declared dead. He says nobody outside will believe Ron's warnings of an impending attack by the gangs of New York but promises the attack will happen. Eventually, Timmy Jim sympathizes with Ron and lets him go. But Ron has realized that he has not regained freedom, but is just about to return into another world, with its own way of slavery. He resolves to open people's eyes to the misery in which the people in New York are living and fight the system that is letting it happen.

== Background ==
In 1960, architects Buckminster Fuller and Shoji Sadao proposed a project called Dome over Manhattan, a 3-kilometer-diameter geodesic domed city covering Midtown Manhattan.

The plans inspired Bova to write a short story titled Manhattan Dome about a near-future New York City, which appeared in the September 1968 issue of Amazing Stories. The story is set in a dystopian future in which a plastic dome has been erected over Manhattan. Originally touted as a way to curb pollution, it has ended up causing many new problems, not all of which have been addressed. A sprinkler system has been installed to address fire safety concerns, as well as placate plumbers. The Dome shields Manhattan from the weather; while special UV street lamps (installed after lobbying from electric light corporations) still allow residents to get a suntan under the Dome, the lack of rain has driven up water prices, to the point that growing vegetables in back gardens has become prohibitively expensive. Worst of all, while the city council approved construction of the dome, they voted against the proposal to ban smoking and motor vehicles inside the Dome, under pressure from the industry but against the advice of the Chief Dome Engineer. As a result, more pollution is generated under the Dome than its infrastructure can handle, and air quality has worsened rather than improved. A year after the completion of the Dome, among ongoing protests from citizens, the government has decided to dismantle it. Just after the decision has been made, the Chief Dome Engineer and the newly appointed chief scientific advisor muse about evicting the residents of the Dome.

Another short story by Bova, titled The Sightseers, appeared in Roger Elwood’s 1973 anthology Future City. While there is no dome above New York City in this story, the city has been evacuated and can only be visited in summer. While health authorities have advised against opening a city for longer than two weeks per year, lobbyism from the tourist industry has resulted in the city being open all summer, shutting down on Labor Day. The first-person narrator is a teenage boy from Michigan who visits the city with his father. The story features many of the elements mentioned at the beginning of the novel—bedicabs, movie theaters showing graphic content, restaurants with human waiters and mandatory lung-cleansing upon exit. Eventually, the son resolves to return next year, possibly on his own. Bova himself writes: “Incidentally, this shortly led to my writing a short novel called City of Darkness, which takes up where this tale ends.”

== Other versions ==
A audiobook of City of Darkness, read by Harlan Ellison, won a 1999 Audie Award.
