= Leopoldo Gout =

Mexican film director

Leopoldo Gout is a Mexican film director, producer, author, and painter.

He has produced films like Days of Grace, Molly's Game, The Postcard Killings, Middle School: The Worst Years of My Life, Maximum Ride and Alex Cross. His films have garnered rave reviews and award attention from Cannes, the Academy Awards and the Ariel Awards.

He has produced television shows like The Chosen One, Jeffrey Epstein: Filthy Rich, Zoo, and Instinct.

He has written novels like Ghost Radio.

== Education and career ==
He studied Contemporary Art at Central Saint Martins in London and currently resides in New York City. His artwork has been displayed in the West Collection Gallery of Pennsylvania. Gout has produced films that were shown at the Cannes 2011 International Film Festival and aired on NBC. He has worked on various film and television projects, including films with author James Patterson, such as the major adaptation, Alex Cross. Gout was also a producer for the THQ video game Leela, which uses motion controls and immersive psychedelic environments to allow the player to connect with their subconscious.

== Film work ==
Leopoldo served as a producer and second unit director[4] on the 2011 film Dias de Gracia (English: Days of Grace), directed by his brother, Evarardo Valerio Gout. The film was screened at the Cannes 2011 International Film Festival and received a positive review from The Hollywood Reporter.[5][6] The film set in the Mexico-based Casa B Productions, which Leopoldo founded with his brother.[7]

Gout produced Alex Cross, the 2012 adaptation of the novel by James Patterson. The film starred Jean Reno, Matthew Fox, and Tyler Perry.[8]

Gout executive produced the 2015 3D nature documentary film Aldabra, narrated by Pierce Brosnan.[10]

Gout co-produced the 2016 film Middle School: The Worst Years of My Life, based on a James Patterson novel.[11]

Gout served as an originating and Executive Producer on Aaron Sorkin's directorial debut, Molly's Game.[12] The film premiered at the Toronto International Film Festival and stars Jessica Chastain, Idris Elba, Kevin Costner, Michael Cera, and Chris O'Dowd.

Leopoldo Gout producered a 2009 short film Passage, directed by Shekhar Kapur.[3]

== Television work ==
Leopoldo co-wrote, co-directed, and was an executive producer on Little Spirit: Christmas in New York, which first aired on 10 December 2008 on NBC. Little Spirit features Danny DeVito and songs written by Duncan Sheik.[1][2]

Gout is the executive producer of Zoo, an adaptation of the James Patterson novel. The CBS series stars James Wolk, Kristen Connolly, Nonso Anozie, and Billy Burke.[9] Beginning in 2015, the series is now in its third season.

Gout is the executive producer of Zoo, an adaptation of the James Patterson novel. The CBS series stars James Wolk, Kristen Connolly, Nonso Anozie, and Billy Burke.[9] Beginning in 2015, the series is now in its third season.

Gout was executive producer of the CBS series Instinct, which began in 2017 and starred Alan Cumming.

== Novel/graphic novel work ==
=== Ghost Radio (2008) ===
Published in 2008 by Harper Collins, Ghost Radio is Leopoldo Gout's first novel. Each chapter begins with an engraving which Gout did himself. The book is a paranormal suspense thriller. Fellow author and collaborator James Patterson describes it as reminiscent of the early work of Stephen King. Originally intended to be a graphic novel, Gout says of his work “the words started to overwhelm the images” at which point he switched away from the graphic format, opting instead to do a traditional novel which includes some illustrations. Each chapter begins with an engraving which Gout did himself. Kirkus Review writes, "Palpable, almost visible cross-cultural creepiness that never lets up: [Ghost Radio is] very smart thrills."

=== Daniel X ===
Leopoldo Gout Collaborated with James Patterson on a graphic novel addition to the Daniel X book series. Daniel X hunts outlaw aliens after the responsibility is passed down to him when his parents are killed. This collaboration is James Patterson's first time working on a graphic novel.

=== Genius: The Game (2016) ===
Published by Feiwel & Friends in 2016, 200 hacking/programming/engineering geniuses gather from around the world to go head to head in a competition designed by India's youngest CEO, Kiran Biswas. The story follows three bright teenagers: Rex, Tunde, and Cai (a.k.a. Painted Wolf). Gout won the 2017 Mathical Book Prize for this book.

=== Genius: The Con (2017) ===
Published by Macmillan in 2017, the sequel follows Rex, Tunde and Cai's mission to find Rex's brother, save Tunde's village from the hands of a corrupt warlord and stop Kiran's attempts at global takeover.

== Art exhibitions ==
- Cambio (1998) - Organized by artist Kenny Schachter, CAMBIO was a series of group shows that took place in temporary spaces with a strong geographic thread: half of the artists lived in Mexico and the other half lived in the United States.
- Tricia Collins Contemporary Art (1999)
- New NYC Art

== Fellowships ==
Gout has established the Genius Foundation to follow the intellectual property of his Genius series that, in partnership with Arizona State University, supports children from disadvantaged communities.
