= Day Zero: The Series =

- Created by: Cal Nguyen
- Starring: Shawn Stevens; Eric McGraw; Carter Blanc; Jason Wright; Calbert Beck; Kabrina Miller
- Country of origin: United States
- Original language: English
- No. of seasons: 3
- No. of episodes: 30

Production
- Executive producer: Cal Nguyen
- Running time: 30 min.

Original release
- Network: Amazon.com / Indieflix / Tuff TV
- Release: October 8, 2011 – February 20, 2014

Day Zero: The Series is a post-apocalyptic web series and television series created and developed by filmmaker/actor Cal Nguyen. It first appeared in 2011 on the web series site blip.tv, then aired on Tuff TV and other web platforms.

== Studio change ==
Around November 10, 2017, the studio responsible for the series all the way through season 2 and during production of season 3, was changed from Fofanugget Productions to Altare Productions, with no other changes to content or intellectual property copyright, other than a new logo.

== Plot ==
During the 22nd Century, science and technology had advanced beyond ethical bounds, so most of mankind reversed course. Eventually, global dictatorships violated the United Nations' Bioethics Treaty, secretly stockpiling arms. As a result, an oblivious America was attacked. Retaliation with augmented nuclear weaponry had unforeseen effects, affecting most survivors in the Western Hemisphere and altering the rest. Those infected became ravenous beasts, feeding off the remaining population. But pockets of humanity remain...

== Cast (past and current principal, recurring or guest stars) ==
- Shawn Stevens - "Father John"
- Derek Boone - "Erik"
- Eric McGraw - "LtCol Thetis"
- Carter Blanc - "LT Shifter"
- Jason Wright - "SGT Pius"
- Calbert Beck - "SSgt Wilkerson"
- Travis Victor Webb - "Father Sergius Formosus"
- Jamie Lynn Bolton - "Barbara Lexington"
- Brandon Lee Christian - "Rufus"
- Jake Ulasich - "Jacob"
- Kayli Brummer - "McKetna"
- Tara Berrett - "Hannah Line"
- David Bodtcher - "Chaplain Amos"
- Kabrina Miller - "Erica Jordan"
- Cal Nguyen - "Jim Lecter"
- David Webb - "Marshall Jason Monty"
- Ron Hausman - "PeaceKeeper"
- Derek Lawson - "Director Frank Sarvis"
- Larry Clifton - "Ben Lott" (Season 3)
- Kelli Dougal - "Myriam Hagar"
- Mark Webb - "President Rand"
- E. Clark Marshall - "Leo Pemberton"
- Joshua Michael French - "Major Courtney"
- Oscar Sanchez - "Isaiah Brown"
- Duy Beck - "SSgt Harris"
- Karlee Broschinsky - "Bernadette Pemberton"
- Emily Broschinsky - "Teresa Pemberton"
- Wren Barnes - "Maria Pemberton"
- Jake Long - "Capitaine Bernard"
- Bill Gillane - "Ben Lott"
- Colin McDermott - "Tiras Abel"
- Flo Donelli - "Diana Cantaray"
- Morgan Mabey - "Namaah Cain"
- Deven Skye (Baldwin) - "Rachael Shore"
- Ken Applegate - "Russell Braddock"
- Emilyne Guglietti - "Kat Finch"
- Leo (Jared) Lynton - "Cameron Clark"
- Richard Scott Dean - "Blake Edwards"
- Julie Touchet - "Rosie Parker"
- Ethan Aguilar - "Landon Parker"
- Scott Smith - "Andrew Mallory"
- Jonathan C. Young - "Micah Sloane"
- Crystal Udy - "Sarah Edwards"
- John F. Cruz - "General Simeon Cain"
- Jaclyn Easton - "First Sergeant Majors"
- Corey Sondrup - "Sergeant-Major Daniels"
- Jonny Swenson - "Private 1st Class Aaron Gonzales"
- Amy Buchanan - "Devra Cunningham"
- Jason Buchanan - "Special Agent Tobit"
- Quinci Staker - "Elizabeth Abimelech"

== TV and web premieres ==
Day Zero was first appeared as a web series in 2011 on blip.tv. In 2014 Over-the-Air television network Tuff TV began airing Day Zero. In 2015 Day Zero was included on Indieflix, and in 2016 on Amazon.com.

== Cast changes ==
The cast of Day Zero has undergone many changes with "Jim Lecter" being the only character to appear in every single episode since the pilot until Season 3 where the character is sporadically shown. Before filming the first season, an initial cast had been filmed partially but due to a changeover of copyright from original writer Kelsi Swensen to Cal Nguyen, and other than Cal Nguyen ("Jim Lecter") himself, the cast was replaced with an entirely new one to form the official season 1 cast (although season 1 composer Amber Masterson, who played the original "Kat Finch", made an actual guest appearance as a different character in the season 1 finale, "Dusk"). Then in season 2, most of the cast other than Cal Nguyen and Deven Skye (Baldwin), remained while new main characters were created. Along with new sets, new title credits and theme music, the crew also changed considerably considering season 1 mainly only had two members (Cal Nguyen and Tim Sabuco), who tripled up duties. In the third season, in which production is underway as of August 2, 2017, Hollywood veteran and 80s soap star Shawn Stevens joined the cast as a lead character named "Father John" and nearly all of the past season actors are no longer on the show except for Oscar Sanchez so far, as the story is now about new characters. On August 18, 2017, Larry Clifton was cast to replace Bill Gillane as "Ben Lott". Season three is set to be released sometime in 2018 on Amazon Video alone at this time.

== DVD release ==
On November 3, 2011, Fofanugget Productions released the original pilot episode of Day Zero ("Lethal") on DVD in Region 1, which was then made unavailable in quarter four of 2016. On December 27, 2016, the series was released as four volumes (five episodes per volume) of both seasons on DVD at the Kunaki site, and then by January 3, 2017, the same volumes were released on Amazon.com for season 1 and season 2, respectively, with bonus features on each disc.

== Interviews ==
Standard-Examiner, December 19, 2014

Filmed in Utah, December 23, 2012

Film Buzz (also on KJZZ "Movie Show"), August 15, 2013
