= Robert Newcomb =

American writer

- Born: 1951 (age 74–75)
- Occupation: Author
- Writing career
- Genre: Fantasy

Robert Newcomb (born 1951) is an American author of fantasy novels published by Del Rey Books. In 2008, Del Rey ceased publishing his books.

== Selected works ==
- The Fifth Sorceress (2002), ISBN 0-345-44892-8.
- The Gates of Dawn (2003), ISBN 0-345-44894-4.
- The Scrolls of the Ancients (2004), ISBN 0-345-44896-0.
- Savage Messiah (2005), ISBN 0-345-47707-3.
- A March into Darkness (2007), ISBN 978-0-345-47709-5.
- Rise of the Blood Royal (December 26, 2007), ISBN 978-0-345-47711-8.

== The Fifth Sorceress ==
Newcomb's debut novel The Fifth Sorceress was accused of misogyny or sexism, and was critically panned. In response to the criticism, Newcomb said his intent was not "to be sexist or to be controversial, or to espouse some anti-politically correct viewpoint. It just happened to be the particular story I wanted to tell to get the saga rolling."
