= Peter Clines =

American author

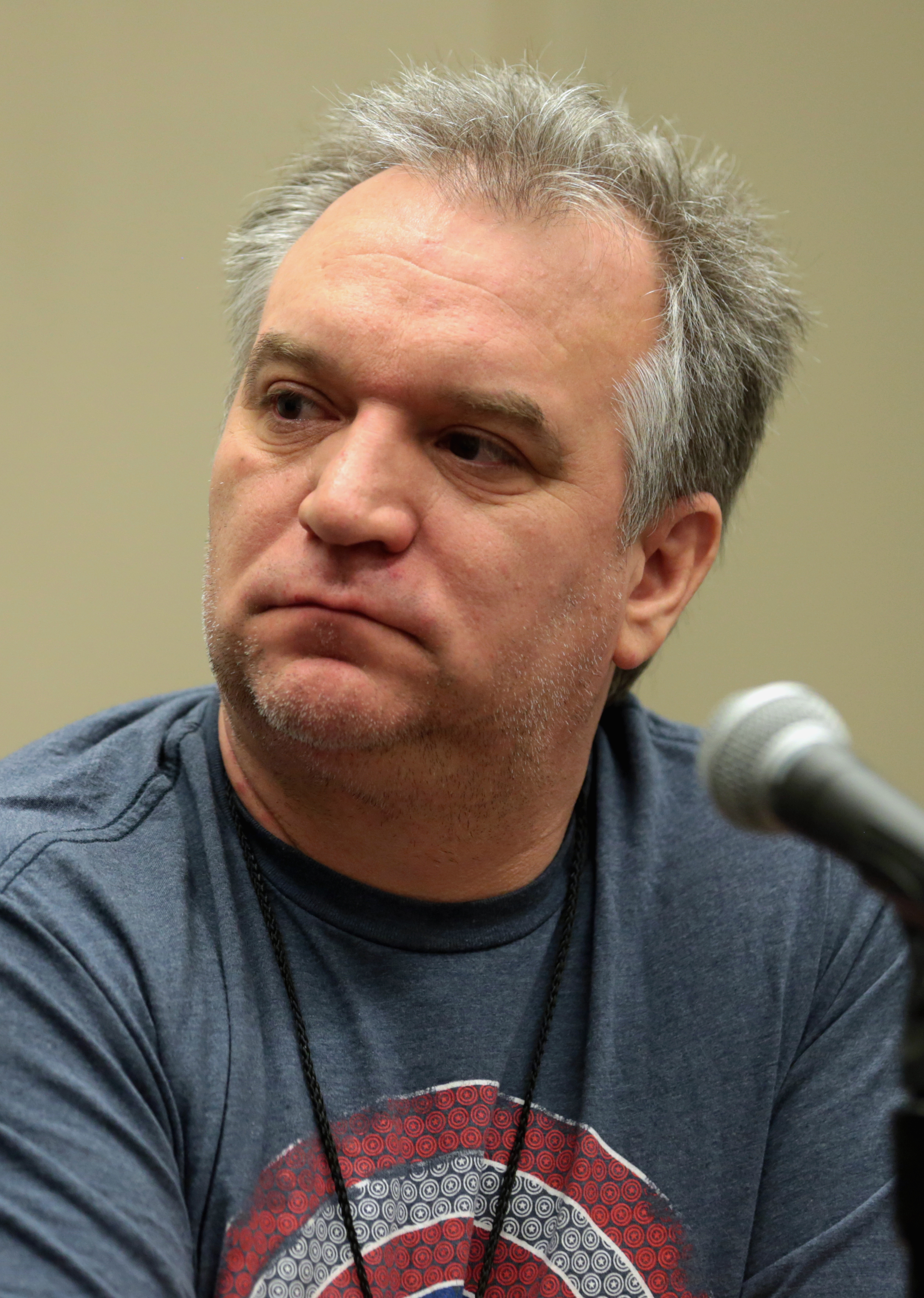
- Clines at the 2018 Phoenix Comic Fest
- Born: May 31, 1969 (age 57); Cape Neddick, Maine, U.S.
- Education: University of Massachusetts Amherst
- Occupations: Writer, novelist
- Writing career
- Genres: Science fiction, horror, speculative fiction, suspense
- Notable works: Ex-Heroes; The Fold; 14
- Website: www.peterclines.com

Peter Clines (born May 31, 1969) is an American author and novelist best known for his zombies-vs-superheroes series, Ex-Heroes, and Lovecraftian inspired Threshold novels 14 and The Fold. His short stories can be found in a variety of anthologies, including X-Files: Trust No One, edited by Jonathan Maberry. Before becoming a full-time writer, Clines worked as a props master in the film industry for 15 years.

== Early life ==
Clines was raised in Cape Neddick, Maine, where his love of storytelling was apparent from a very young age. While in third grade, he used his handwriting practice paper to pen his first story, Lizard Men From the Center of the Earth. Clines continued telling stories as a kid, sometimes using Micronauts and Star Wars figurines to create scenes, and other times in writing. As a self-professed "comic geek", Clines created hero characters all through grade school. He submitted various comic book scripts to Marvel Comics. At age 11, he received his first professional rejection letter from Jim Shooter, the then editor-in-chief at Marvel. Clines describers it as "a very personal, very polite and professional" rejection letter. Being taken seriously as a young writer, first by Shooter and then by Marvel's Tom DeFalco, who also sent an encouraging and helpful rejection letter a few years later, encouraged Clines to continue working on his craft.

Clines graduated from University of Massachusetts, Amherst in 1991 with a degree in English Literature. As a student, he worked as a local roadie crew for traveling bands.

== Career ==
While Clines worked as a props master, his writing turned from props to focus on scripts. In 2006, after the end of a film project, he dedicated himself to writing full-time. He worked for Creative Screenwriting Magazine, writing interviews, reviews, and articles. While at Creative Screenwriter, Clines interviewed, among others, George Romero, Frank Darabont, Seth Rogen, Diablo Cody, Sylvester Stallone, and the late Nora Ephron.

Clines made his first fiction sale, The Hatbox, to online journal The Harrow. He continued to sell zombie and Lovecraftian short stories to anthologies before he began writing his first published novel, Ex-Heroes, in 2008.

== Bibliography ==
=== Threshold series ===
Title	Date	Format	Pages	Publisher	ISBN
14	June 5, 2012	Paperback	469 pages	Permuted Press	ISBN 1618684981
The Fold	June 2, 2015	Hardcover	384 pages	Crown	ISBN 0553418297
Dead Moon	February 2019	Ebook	348 pages	Kavach Press	ASIN B07WP9QSCQ
Terminus	January 2020	Audio Book	NA	Audible Original	ASIN B082MQXBSL

=== Ex-Heroes series ===
Number	Title	Format	Pages	Publisher	Date	ISBN
1	Ex-Heroes	Paperback	336 pages	Broadway Books	February 26, 2013	ISBN 0804136572
2	Ex-Patriots	Paperback	432 pages	Broadway Books	April 23, 2013	ISBN 0804136599
3	Ex-Communication	Paperback	352 pages	Broadway Books	July 9, 2013	ISBN 0385346824
4	Ex-Purgatory	Paperback	352 pages	Broadway Books	January 14, 2014	ISBN 0804136610
5	Ex-Isle	Paperback	400 pages	Broadway Books	February 2, 2016	ISBN 0553418319

=== Standalone titles ===
Title	Format	Pages	Publisher	Date	ISBN
The Junkie Quatrain	Kindle	108 pages	Permuted Press	January 13, 2013	ASIN B0073OGW1M
The Eerie Adventures of the Lycanthrope Robinson Crusoe	Paperback	272 pages	Permuted Press	March 8, 2016	ISBN 161868633X
Dead Men Can't Complain and Other Stories	Audiobook	N/A	Audible Originals	May 23, 2017	ASIN B06XX451TV
Paradox Bound	Hardcover	336 pages	Crown	September 26, 2017	ISBN 0553418335
The Broken Room	Paperback	417 Pages	Blackstone Publishing	March 2022	ASIN B09N7DYY1Z
God's Junk Drawer	Hardcover	590 pages	Blackstone Publishing	November 2025	ASIN B0DVMHPNPM

=== Anthology appearances ===
Anthology	Format	Pages	Publisher	Date	ISBN
Cthulhu Unbound, Vol. 2, edited by John Sonseri and Thomas Branton	Paperback	276 pages	Permuted Press	July 31, 2009	ISBN 1934861146
The World Is Dead, edited by Kim Paffenroth	Paperback	288 pages	Permuted Press	September 15, 2009	ISBN 1934861251
Timelines: Stories Inspired by H.G. Wells' The Time Machine, edited by JW Schnarr	Paperback	286 pages	Northern Frights Publishing	September 1, 2010	ISBN 0973483733
Times of Trouble: A Time Travel Anthology, edited by Lane Adamso	Kindle Edition only	345 pages	Permuted Press	April 28, 2013	ASIN B00CKZRAH4
Bless Your Mechanical Heart, edited by Jennifer Brozek	Paperback	278 pages	Evil Girlfriend Media	March 17, 2014	ISBN 1940154057
Kaiju Rising: Age of Monsters, edited by Tim Marquitz	Paperback	550 pages	Ragnarok Publications	July 1, 2014	ISBN 0991360567
Corrupts Absolutely?: Dark Metahuman Fiction, edited by Lincoln Crisler	Paperback	360 pages	Ragnarok Publications	February 23, 2015	ISBN 1941987427
X-Files: Trust No One, edited by Jonathan Maberry	Paperback	360 pages	IDW Publishing	July 28, 2015	ISBN 1631402781
Naughty or Nice: A Holiday Anthology, edited by Jennifer Brozek	Paperback	252 pages	Evil Girlfriend Media	October 30, 2015	ISBN 194015412X
