= The Fifth Sorceress =

2002 book

- Author: Robert Newcomb
- Publisher: Del Rey/Ballantine
- Publication date: August 1, 2002
- ISBN: 0-345-44892-8

The Fifth Sorceress is a 2002 debut epic fantasy novel by American writer Robert Newcomb. It is the first entry in The Chronicles of Blood and Stone trilogy, followed by The Gates of Dawn (2003), and The Scrolls of the Ancients (2004). It follows a prince named Tristan on his quest to save the world from a coven of evil sorceresses.

The book was a critical and commercial flop, with critics calling it derivative and some accusing it of misogyny, sexism, and homophobia due to its portrayal of women and their supposed promiscuity.

== Plot summary ==
The book begins with a prologue three hundred years before the main story. At the conclusion of a conflict called The Sorceress War, a wizard named Wigg is in charge of exiling the four leaders of the sorceress army across an impassable ocean. The sorceresses cannot simply be executed since all wizards take an oath not to kill any innocents under their power, so they are instead sent off in a small boat with enough provisions for a few days and they swear to return one day.

Three-hundred-twenty-seven years after this, a man named Tristan is set to inherit the throne of Eutracia, as his father, Nicholas, must abdicate on Tristan's 30th birthday. Tristan is unwilling to become king, but relents, seeing it as his duty. The coronation ceremony involves the Directorate of Wizards, led by Wigg, taking a magical necklace from King Nicholas before handing it over to Tristan. During the transition they are all powerless, and so Wigg suggests performing the real coronation in secret before putting on a mock coronation for the public. Nicholas rejects this idea.

During the ceremony, the sorceresses and their minions, mutated humanoid creatures with leather wings, attack and massacre the attendees, including King Nicholas and the Directorate of Wizards. Tristan's sister Shailiha is kidnapped so that the sorceresses can use her as the fifth part of their circle.

As Eutracia is destroyed, Tristan and Wigg travel to the home of the gnomes for a way to travel across the ocean and confront the sorceresses in their lair. En route, Tristan meets and becomes infatuated with a woman named Lilith, who later turns out to be a sorceress agent. She sexually assaults him with the intent of becoming pregnant with a child that has his massive magical power. Wigg kills her before Tristan orgasms though, which according to him means it was not a real rape. After this, they reach the gnomes and are teleported across the ocean.

Meanwhile, Shailiha undergoes severe psychological torture to make her believe that the other sorceresses are her friends and that Tristan is her enemy.

Upon arrival at the sorceress keep, Tristan and Wigg manage to sneak inside with the help of a double agent, however they are captured not long after. While imprisoned, Tristan is again sexually assaulted by a sorceress named Succiu and this time she is impregnated. Using magic she forces her pregnancy to progress rapidly until she is ready to give birth a few days later. At this time, the sorceresses reveal their plan.

Using a full circle of five, they will cast a spell to kill every human on the planet except for themselves and Tristan. Then they will all repopulate with their magically gifted offspring, creating a sort of master race. Inbreeding will not be an issue, as they developed a spell to counter the negative effects.

Wigg manages to cast a spell that deprives the sorceresses of their power and then destroys their keep, killing several of them and causing their minions to flee. Succiu commits suicide by jumping from the roof of their keep, and Tristan returns later to cut his unborn child from her womb for burial. He, Wigg, and Shailiha begin the return trip to Eutracia only to be stopped by the remaining minions. Tristan duels the leader in single combat, making him the new leader. Finally he returns home to rebuild and rehabilitate his sister.

In the epilogue, mysterious figures discuss unknown plans as they bring Tristan's child back from the dead.

== Reception ==
The Fifth Sorceress was accused of misogyny or sexism, and was critically panned. William Thompson called it "a fairly typical fledgling effort by a new author, at times well told but marred by poor decisions." However some critics gave it praise, Kirkus reviews called it "An intelligent debut, possibly headed for bestsellerdom." Fantasybookreview gave it a mixed review, praising Newcomb's descriptive prose, but calling the extreme violence unnecessary.
