= Dennis E. Taylor =

Canadian science fiction author

- Education: British Columbia Institute of Technology (attended)
- Occupation: Novelist
- Writing career
- Language: English
- Genre: Science fiction
- Website: dennisetaylor.org

Dennis E. Taylor is a Canadian author and former computer programmer known for his large-scale hard science fiction stories exploring the interaction between artificial intelligence and the human condition.

== Early life and career ==
Taylor is from the Greater Vancouver area. He attended British Columbia Institute of Technology but never completed a degree. He was a computer programmer for most of his career, having taught himself to program in his early twenties using a Tandy TRS-80. He spent most of his career working in corporate IT departments, including at Insurance Corporation of British Columbia.

== Writing career ==
Taylor self-published his first novel, Outland, in 2015, and began working with an agent to try to publish his second novel, We Are Legion (We Are Bob). Taylor's agent struggled to find a publisher for the book but received an audiobook deal offer from Audible. The unabridged audiobook version of We Are Legion, read by Ray Porter, was a major success and was named Audible's 2016 Best Science Fiction Audiobook of the Year.

After the success of We Are Legion (We Are Bob), Taylor expanded the Bobiverse series with sequels For We Are Many and All These Worlds. The books delved into themes such as artificial intelligence, space exploration, and the future of humanity, all while maintaining a lighthearted and often humorous tone. In September 2020, Taylor released his sixth novel Heaven's River, the fourth book in the Bobiverse series. Book five, Not Till We Are Lost, followed in September 2024. The sixth book, The Infinite Extent, was released as an audiobook in September 2026, with text editions to follow in January.

Taylor's 2018 novel The Singularity Trap as well as his 2020 novel Heaven's River debuted on The New York Times Bestseller List for Fiction Audiobooks.

Taylor's works have been translated into several languages, including Japanese, German, French and Polish.

== Major themes ==
Taylor's Bobiverse series examines themes such as cryonics, mind uploading, and artificial intelligence and their potential impacts on society and the human condition. Another major topic is global catastrophic risk, which is also featured in Outland and The Singularity Trap.

== Recognition ==
The novel We Are Legion (We Are Bob) was a finalist of the 2019 Seiun Awards.

In October 2018, Taylor was added to the XPRIZE Foundation Science Fiction Advisory Council as a "Visionary Storyteller". This group of accomplished science fiction authors help advise the XPRIZE team on envisioning the future.

In May 2019, Taylor participated in a Talks at Google event where he shared insights into the inspirations behind his writings and discussed his plans for the upcoming years.

== Personal life ==
Taylor resides near Vancouver, British Columbia, Canada, with his wife and daughter.

== Works ==
=== Bobiverse (2016– ) ===
The series follows Bob Johansson, a man whose mind is uploaded into a self-replicating space probe after death. As he creates multiple copies of himself, the “Bobs” spread across the galaxy, exploring star systems, encountering alien life, and helping humanity survive beyond Earth.

Over time, the expanding network of Bobs begins to diverge in personality and priorities, leading to internal conflicts alongside external threats. The series blends large-scale space exploration with questions about identity, autonomy, and the challenges of coordinating an ever-growing, decentralized intelligence across interstellar distances.

In 2025 it was announced that the film adaptation rights for the Bobiverse series were acquired by Lord Miller Productions

No.	Title	Audiobook	Print	ISBN	Synopsis
1	We Are Legion	20 September 2016	20 October 2016	978-1-68068-032-4 (1st ed.); 978-1-68068-058-4 (rev. ed.)	After his death in the early 21st century, software engineer Bob Johansson is cryogenically preserved and later revived as the controlling AI of a self-replicating interstellar probe. Tasked with exploring the galaxy and securing resources for humanity, Bob begins cloning himself, creating divergent versions with distinct personalities. As competing nations launch their own probes, the Bobs must contend with hostile rivals, ethical dilemmas about guiding human colonies, and the practical challenges of survival in deep space, beginning at Epsilon Eridani.
2	For We Are Many	18 April 2017	14 April 2017	978-1-68068-059-1	With dozens of Bob clones now spread across nearby star systems, the Bobiverse expands rapidly. Different Bobs take on specialized roles—exploration, defense, and shepherding fragile human colonies. They encounter new alien ecosystems and increasingly dangerous threats, including aggressive extraterrestrial species and rival probes. Internal coordination becomes more complex as the Bobs develop unique identities, forcing them to balance cooperation with independence while protecting humanity’s scattered remnants.
3	All These Worlds	8 August 2017	25 July 2017	978-1-68068-060-7	The conflict with a highly destructive alien species escalates, threatening both the Bobs and the human colonies they support. As the Bob network grows, divisions emerge over strategy, priorities, and the extent of intervention in human affairs. The story focuses on large-scale coordination across multiple star systems, the limits of replication-based expansion, and the consequences of decentralized decision-making as the Bobs attempt to secure a long-term future for humanity.
4	Heaven's River	24 September 2020	24 January 2021	978-1-68068-226-7	A search mission for a missing Bob leads to the discovery of a massive artificial ringworld orbiting a distant star. Unlike previous encounters, this structure houses a complex and relatively stable alien civilization. The narrative shifts toward exploration, anthropology, and ethical restraint, as the Bobs must observe without destabilizing the inhabitants. At the same time, tensions within the Bobiverse continue to grow, reflecting increasing philosophical divergence among the clones.
5	Not Till We Are Lost	5 September 2024	16 January 2025	978-1-68068-358-5	As the Bobiverse pushes farther into unexplored regions of space, the scale of operations introduces new logistical and existential challenges. Resource limitations, communication delays, and strategic disagreements become more pronounced. The Bobs face emerging threats that test their ability to coordinate across vast distances, while also confronting deeper questions about identity, purpose, and the long-term sustainability of an ever-expanding network of autonomous copies.
6	The Infinite Extent	10 September 2026	TBA (Note: Text editions announced for 10 January.)		
7	TBA (Note: A tentative title was previously announced, but was dropped after the author learned that John Scalzi had published a book under the same name.)	TBA	TBA		

=== Quantum Earth (2015–) ===
No.	Title	Date	ISBN	Notes
1	Outland	9 January 2015	978-1-5056-3119-7 (1st ed.); 978-1-68068-148-2 (rev. ed.)	Self-published in 2015. Revised edition published in 2017.
2	Earthside	26 May 2023	978-1-68068-337-0	Audiobook was available as an Audible Original in January 2023.

=== Standalone works ===
Title	Date	ISBN	Notes
The Singularity Trap	11 July 2018	978-1-68068-088-1	The New York Times Bestseller
Roadkill	9 December 2022	978-1-68068-312-7	Audiobook was available as an Audible Original in August 2022.
"A Change of Plans"	9 October 2017	978-1-9781-3894-0	Collected in Explorations: Colony, vol. 4 of the Explorations anthology series.
Ten Thousand Worlds	TBA		

=== Audible Original stories ===
Stories released as Audible Originals as read by Ray Porter (who has also read other books by Taylor). Roadkill and Earthside were later published in paperback. As of September 2023, Feedback is available to read exclusively on Amazon's Kindle platform.

Title	Audible release	Kindle edition	Ref.
Feedback	19 November 2020	15 February 2023	
Roadkill	4 August 2022	1 December 2022	
Earthside	26 January 2023	25 May 2023	
Flybot	26 June 2025	19 November 2025	

== See also ==
- Von Neumann probe
- The Singularity
- Topopolis
- Matrioshka brain
