= 14 (novel) =

2012 science fiction novel

- Author: Peter Clines
- Language: English
- Series: Threshold
- Genre: Science fiction
- Publisher: Permuted Press
- Publication date: 2012
- Media type: Print (Hardcover, Paperback)
- ISBN: 9781618684981
- Followed by: The Fold

14 is a 2012 science fiction novel by American author Peter Clines.

== Plot ==
14 follows Nate Tucker, a man living in Los Angeles who is stuck in a dead-end data entry job and uncertain about his future. Just as he needs to find a new place to live, he hears at an after-work gathering about an apartment building with unusually low rent. Nate signs a lease for $565 a month (utilities included) at the Kavach building, and soon, its many mysteries begin to unravel.

Nate discovers that Oskar Rommel, the building manager, is unwilling to share much information. He encounters various oddities: a colony of bright green, seven-legged cockroaches; a kitchen light that remains a blacklight regardless of the bulb used; and four large padlocks securing the door to apartment 14. He befriends several neighbors—Veek, Roger, Xela, Clive, Debbie, and newcomer Tim—and together, they begin to uncover the building's secrets.

They learn that the Kavach building is not connected to the city's power grid but instead draws energy from a network of Westinghouse generators located nearly a mile underground, tapping into a fault line. The walls of various apartments are inscribed with scientific formulas, population growth algorithms, and a letter from Aleksander Koturovich—one of the building's creators—which provides insight into its purpose. Koturovich, along with Whipple Van Buren Phillips and Nikola Tesla, built the Kavach as a barrier to shield reality from multi-dimensional predators that emerge once Earth's population reaches a critical threshold.

Behind the paneling in Clive and Debbie's apartment, they discover a system of knobs and switches that control the building's protective mechanisms. When the group breaks into apartment 14, they find that it contains a spatial anomaly—a pocket of space acting as a counterbalance for the building's power.

The story reaches its climax when Andrew, another resident and a member of the doomsday cult known as the Family of the Red Death, deactivates the building's defenses, allowing the creatures to enter this reality. In the chaos, Oskar is taken by a flying creature, and Tim is killed while attempting a rescue. Nate and the remaining residents manage to reactivate the control system, banish the creatures back to their dimension, and restore the building to its proper place in Los Angeles. The novel concludes with Nate becoming the new manager of the Kavach building.

== Characters ==
- Nate Tucker – The protagonist, a man in his 30s who finds new purpose after uncovering the secrets of the Kavach building.
- Malavika "Veek" Vishwanath – An Indian woman and skilled black hat hacker who becomes Nate's partner. She also appears in Terminus as a main character.
- Anne – A minor character in both 14 (as a temp at Nate's office) and The Fold (as a receptionist). She becomes a major antagonist in Terminus.

== Reception ==
In his review for Nerds on Earth, Joseph Robinson praised 14 for its suspenseful buildup, which defied his expectations. However, he noted that the characters are not deeply developed and often make decisions primarily to advance the plot.

== Origins ==
In the afterword of 14, Peter Clines shares that the novel debuted as an advanced readers edition sold at the 2012 Crypticon in Seattle, prior to its official publication.
