= The Book of the Unnamed Midwife =

2014 Meg Elison sci-i novel

- Author: Meg Elison
- Audio read by: Angela Dawe
- Language: English
- Series: The Road to Nowhere #1
- Genre: Dystopian fiction
- Set in: Post-apocalypse
- Publisher: Sybaritic Press
- Publication date: June 5, 2014
- Publication place: United States
- Media type: Print
- Pages: 190 pp
- Award: Philip K. Dick Award
- ISBN: 9781495116360 (paperback 1st ed.)
- OCLC: 885337802
- Dewey Decimal: PS3605.L3945 B66 2016
- LC Class: 813/.6

The Book of the Unnamed Midwife is a post-apocalyptic feminist novel written by American author Meg Elison, published in 2014 by Sybaritic Press. This novel is the winner of the Philip K Dick Award. It is the first novel in her The Road to Nowhere Trilogy.

== Setting & Plot ==
=== Prologue ===
The prologue lays out a radically changed world where the buildings have sustained major damage and the glass in windows have been replaced with plastic sheets. Readers are introduced to a school and a teacher called Mother Ina who wears a hollow wooden apparatus designed to look like a pregnant belly. She begins instructing a class of prepubescent boys on copying down the story of the unnamed Midwife, similar to how monks would copy the Bible by hand before the invention of the printing press. She tells the boys, and through them, the reader, that what they are about to embark on is a defining story of how their community came to be. It is a sad and difficult story, and Mother Ina warns the boys that parts might make them feel sad, angry, or sick.

She gives hygiene instructions to the boys, further indicating the value of the books. The book, which is actually a series of journals written by the unnamed Midwife, is the story of how our world became theirs.

=== The Book of the Unnamed Midwife ===
The beginning of the book is recorded as January 15. The Midwife is a labor and delivery nurse who is in a relationship with a handsome research doctor named Jack and she works at the University of California San Francisco medical hospital. She has heard of a serious disease, that she calls “the fever thing”, which seems to pop up all at once, everywhere. She notices that it seems to be especially deadly to women, parents that are actively giving birth, and their neonates.

This new pandemic is highly lethal, killing about 95% of the men, 99% of the women, and, as far as the Midwife knows 100% of the children that contract it.

The Midwife herself gets the disease but becomes one of the very few who survived it. In the shock of waking up alone in a hospital full of dead people, she heads home.

Throughout the book from this point on, the perspective of the book switches from the Midwife’s first-person accounts via entries in her journal to occasional first-person accounts from other survivors and a third-person omniscient account of a narrator who talks about the impact of the pandemic on the Midwife, the other survivors that she meets, as well as on the wider world.

Back at home, she learns that the water is no longer working, and her groceries have mostly gone bad. As she eats and drinks a few shelf-stable items, she tries her TV, which is also dead. After sleeping for over a day she is woken up when a strange man gets into bed with her. He attempts to rape her, but the Midwife slices his throat open with her pocketknife. He dies, bleeding out on her bed, and she grabs a few things, including her journal, and leaves the apartment.

She wanders the Tenderloin district dazed until she smells someone cooking and discovers a gay man named Joe using an abandoned restaurant to make food. The first time she introduces herself is the first time she decides to change her name.

The Midwife tells Joe her name is Karen, the name of someone who died a week ago. She tells her journal that she feels that revealing her name would be giving away some kind of power, or intimacy, that she’d rather keep to herself.

After Karen and Joe eat the pupusas that he was cooking, another man comes running in with a leg tangled in razor wire. Joe introduces the man as his boyfriend, Chicken, so nicknamed for winning games of chicken then selling the cars for income. The Midwife uses her skills as a healer to help Chicken with his leg.

They walk to a mall and split up looking for supplies. After raiding a coffee shop, she sees a group of four men, and notices how they stop and gape at her. She doesn’t understand what is happening, but her instincts tell her to run and she turns to run just as one of the men uncoils a length of chain from his fist. She’s running through the mall when she sees Joe and Chicken running after her. They get out of the boarded-up mall first and hide in a dumpster until they are sure the men are gone.

After they escape, Chicken makes it clear that he and Joe no longer want her to travel with them because she’s a woman. He says that gangs of heterosexual men would fight or even kill them to get her, and Chicken is not about to chance it. Joe shrugs and follows Chicken.

This introduces what the Midwife learns is the new world order – men seeing women not as fellow human beings, but as a rare natural resource to be used both for pleasure (most women the Midwife meets post-pandemic complain of anal and oral rape) and in what she describes as “the fury to impregnate” despite the danger to the lives of the birth-givers. Cis gendered, heterosexual men in the new world are revealed to be utterly callous toward the danger that rape and impregnation poses to birth-givers.

The attempted rape, the chase, and the rejection of the only two people who didn’t want to hurt her shows the Midwife that whatever else may be true in this new world, her gender is now a target for violence, and likely death. But, in San Francisco she can get what is needed to visibly change her gender. She cuts her long hair and finds a compression vest for her chest, dresses in men’s clothes but cannot find a costume beard.

She loads her backpack with all the birth control she can raid from the clinic at a local university. She understands that there’s nothing she can do to keep babies alive (she learned while still working at the hospital), but she can try to keep as many women as possible alive by stopping them from getting pregnant. She thinks, “So is that the mission then? Angel of birth control?”

Eventually, the Midwife, now disguised as a man, encounters two men and one woman traveling together. She offers the men two cans of food and two bottles of liquor to have 30 minutes alone with the woman, named Jenna. Alone on the roof of the building that she’s staying in, the Midwife is stunned to see how indifferent Jenna is to her circumstances, calling the men who traded her sexual services so cheaply as “not that bad.” She reveals that she is a woman to Jenna and needs to convince her to receive a shot of Depo-Provera and a few NeuvaRings. The Midwife had assumed that other women survivors would want to avoid pregnancy and preserve their lives just as she did.

After the party leaves, she overhears many wandering bands of men talk about heading to Mexico or other countries further south. Eventually, she finds a car where the radio still works, and hears a repeating message encouraging everyone to “bring their women” south to Costa Rica or Panama. She realizes that there is no way for a radio station to have enough power to broadcast from those countries, she strongly suspects it is a trap of some kind, so she decides to head north. She now has a mission and a direction.

Continuing north, the Midwife arrives near Mt. Shasta and a small lake that appears to have vacation cottages around it. She decides to spend the winter there and finds good winter gear in the closets. She also finds a note left by the lone survivor to the other members of the household who had died, again talking about heading south.

She spends the time working out to make her arms look more manly, eating to put on weight, and practicing firing her two guns. Eventually, a large group of men occupy another house at the lake. Unlike the Midwife, they are given to drinking in excess and making loud noises. They eventually find out that someone is occupying another house on the lake, and when they figure out the occupant is a woman, they try raiding the home to trap her into being their sex slave. The Midwife empties her guns at them, killing only a few, but the rest decide to leave the lake.

In the spring she heads east, and in a small town in Nevada she encounters a group of five men who have two women on chain-and-padlock leashes. She introduces herself as Alex. She ends up killing the men to try to save the two women, Roxanne and Melissa.

Roxanne is a mid-forties casino cocktail waitress from Las Vegas who found love later in life with a younger woman. Melissa is a teenager from Michigan who was traveling with her boyfriend before the men killed him and captured and raped her. Roxanne reveals that she knew the Midwife was a woman. Alex then tries to rally them to get supplies to survive in the world without male owners.

Roxanne blithely gathers whatever she can, but Melissa asks the Midwife for something that will end her life without pain. The Midwife refuses but is unsurprised when Melissa is gone in the morning. The Midwife and Roxanne head out without looking for her.

The Midwife and Roxanne share stories, read trashy romance novels together, and raid homes for supplies including a clownishly huge .357 Magnum which Roxanne keeps. Roxanne describes to Alex how a girl the men also kept as a sex slave became pregnant. She died giving birth, and the baby was stillborn, just as the Midwife saw at UCSF.

The Midwife talks of having relationships with both men and women and knowing that Roxanne’s last lover was a woman. She silently wishes that Roxanne would want to have sex with her. Throughout the book, the Midwife finds her own strong urge to have sex surprising given the dire circumstances that might result from doing so.

They eventually run into a man named Duke traveling by motorcycle, and Roxanne leaves the Midwife to travel with him, emotionally devastating the Midwife. Later, the reader learns from the third person narrator that while Duke was big and scary looking, he instantly gave up himself and Roxanne to a gang of men with superior firepower, just as the Midwife had predicted.

They had been heading south, following the repeated radio broadcasts, and walked directly into a trap set by the gang who was broadcasting the message in southern California. The gang kills Duke and locks Roxanne in a military garrison with one other girl who could neither hear nor speak and who only knew sign language. The girl died within the first year. Roxanne lived out the rest of her long life enslaved in the garrison, the only woman the men there ever had.

The Midwife continues east and finds herself wandering the small towns of rural Utah. In a tiny farming community called Eden she sees some livestock being raised as if there were still farmers. She eventually runs into a young man named Frank. She introduces herself as Dusty, a young man from San Francisco.

Frank tells Dusty that they are a community of Mormons, they are trying to rebuild society, and the younger men of the community are still being sent out on missions. He says the missions are to find others, men and women, and bring them back to the community. He insists that Dusty join them for dinner, so she goes with him to the community.

She’s desperate to keep them from finding out that she is actually a woman but stays for dinner because turning down a communal meal might be seen as suspicious.

At dinner, she finds out that the community has three women, all married to men, and four children, two boys and two girls, that are kept quarantined from everyone else. They are being cared for only by the three remaining women. This is the first time the Midwife hears of survivors that were not adults.

Dusty is invited to spend the night, which she does. The modesty rules of Mormonism work in her favor because she only needs to undress behind closed doors. In the morning she learns from the community leader that young men from the community are being sent out on missions for the same reason that she’s being asked to leave – there are too many men and too few women. The remaining older men of the community are all desperate to court the women once their current husbands are sent on missions, or die in “accidents.”

After leaving the community the Midwife finds a home that was owned by doomsday preppers, so it has more than enough stored food, wood, guns, and other things she’ll need to survive the winter.

A little over a month later one of the three women, Jodi, the youngest and most beautiful, ends up knocking on her door asking for sanctuary from the community. The Midwife is stunned into silence when Jodi reveals that she is pregnant and has hidden her pregnancy from the whole community. She had been married to her high school sweetheart, Honus, and a week later he had been sent on one of the doomed missions. She left the community to find Dusty because now that Honus is a month late getting back from his mission the elders were pressuring her to allow the older men in the community to court her.

The Midwife tells Jodi that she is a woman. She explains about her experience in labor and delivery and Jodi is delighted to be staying with someone who can help her with her pregnancy and labor.

Dusty, having been without a companion for nearly a year, remembers Roxanne fondly and hopes that Jodi will be a similarly good friend. Her hopes are quickly dashed when she discovers that Jodi’s favorite, and only, topic of conversation are reality shows, especially any show featuring a real housewife or a bachelor or bachelorette. Dusty quickly tires of her company.

They settle into a household routine where Jodi washes and cooks and Dusty chops wood and hunts. While Dusty longs for some alone time, Jodi is afraid to be alone and goes raiding with Dusty, much to Dusty’s displeasure.

The home is visited by men from the community looking for Jodi, and Dusty tells them she hasn’t seen Jodi since the night she ate dinner at the community center. She pretends to be sick with the disease to drive the men away. After they leave, Dusty and Jodi know it’s dangerous to stay somewhere they can be found easily, but it’s also dangerous to find new lodgings in the middle of winter, especially for a pregnant person.

One night, there is a similar knock at the door, and Jodi is already in a broom closet by the time Dusty gets the door. At the door is Honus back from his mission. Jodi enthusiastically welcomes him with open arms, and all three begin living together.

The Midwife is surprised to learn that Jodi and Honus sleep in separate rooms, and Honus discloses that Jodi doesn’t like sex. Because her training as a midwife has given her a medical background in sexual health, Dusty starts coaching Honus on ways to entice his wife to want sex, and sexual tension quickly blooms between Dusty and Honus.

Although Honus won’t talk about his mission, Dusty finds his journal and reads it behind his back. She learns that Honus and his mission partner found one woman who kept a large group of men to serve her and pays them with sexual favors and drugs. While Honus is disgusted by how they live, his partner takes the drugs and joins the orgy. Honus leaves him there, even though doing so causes Honus a huge amount of guilt and shame.

This new living arrangement, one woman who has sex with many men in exchange for their labor and protection, is revealed to be a new standard. It is referred to as a hive, with a singular queen and many so-called “drones” that serve her.

Honus has an almanac, so the date is finally revealed. It’s Christmas, and all three have a modest celebration with gifts Honus has acquired while out raiding. Shortly thereafter, Jodi gives birth to a stillborn baby boy. Dusty and Honus cremate the body so scavengers don’t get to it. Although Jodi survives the birth, she falls into a deep depression, and just sits and watches a solar-powered TV that Honus gave her for Christmas.

While Dusty and Honus tend Jodi and try to figure out what the future might look like, they begin having sex. Honus tries to talk Dusty into becoming a sister wife to Jodi, but Dusty just laughs at him. Honus then tries to convince her to come back with him and Jodi to the Mormon community but makes it clear that she’d have to come as a woman and marry a man in the community, which Dusty resoundingly rejects.

After Jodi begins to recover enough to eat and talk, Dusty decides to move on. She warns Honus against returning to the community because they’ll try to kill him so Jodi can marry again, but acknowledges that it is likely what they will do. She forces some birth control pills on Jodi and continues east alone.

From the narrator, the reader finds out that after Jodi and Honus return to the community, they found that one of the missionaries returned with a woman as his wife. However, after she joined the community, it was discovered that she had contracted the disease that caused the pandemic and it killed most of the remaining community members and 3 of the 4 children. The sole surviving elder weds the remaining child, Patty, who is 9, and keeps her locked up from everyone else in his mansion. One night, Jodi and Honus take a rifle into his house and free Patty, who the elder has been raping despite promising not to until the girl reaches 16. Jodi, Honus, and Patty return to the house the couple had shared with Dusty.

After many miscarriages Jodi finally went full term with a baby girl, but this time both she and the baby die in childbirth. Honus and Patty stay in the house and eventually form a romantic and sexual relationship. Patty was not able to conceive children, so they both lived to an old age and never saw or interacted with anyone else.

The Midwife comes close to St. Louis, where she finds another kind of community called Fort Nowhere. It is in an old army fort and even has a few left-over service members in it. Unlike all the other communities and groups discussed in the book, it is run as a free community where members make their own choices about with whom, and if, they want to have sex. She chooses the name Jane and decides to make her home with them.

Eventually, two men and a bruised and battered sex slave show up at the gate. The men offer to give the slave to community if they could stay. The woman, Colleen, was turned over to Jane for an exam. She discovers that Colleen had been subjected to female genital mutilation (FGM). Stunned with this new development in the sex slave trade, she reports this finding to the community’s leader, Daniel. Jane is then allowed to execute both the men. Colleen stays at Fort Nowhere, and eventually gives birth to Rhea, the first human child that lived in the 25 years since the pandemic.

=== Epilogue ===
Mother Ina returns home after her day of overseeing the boys who are copying the journals of the Midwife. Via her thoughts, the reader is made aware that she has a daughter of her own that lived, and she is honored in her community as the mother of a living child by wearing the wooden pregnancy belly. The narrative also reveals that her daughter, Etta, has chosen to hunt slavers instead of trying to give birth and teach the boys who copy down the journals like her mother.

Ina reads her own copy of the journal before going to sleep, giving the impression that the Midwife’s journal is seen as important or even equivalent to a religious text to Ina’s community.

At the end of the novel, the Midwife tenuously declares the birth of the first living child a victory.

== Origin ==
In November 2020, the author, Meg Elison, discussed the novel. The first in the series The Road to Nowhere, which Elison says was named with "dual meaning of utopia...it might be a good place, but its probably no place." Elison also recognized the influence of the Talking Heads song with the same name "Road to Nowhere" as the series' theme music. The second novel in the series is The Book of Etta (2017), which is followed by the finale entitled The Book of Flora (2019).

The Book of the Unnamed Midwife sits with other feminist narratives sharing women's perspectives in apocalyptic settings. Some examples of this narrative are Vox (2018) by Christina Dalcher; Bina Shak's Before She Sleeps (2018); The Water Cure (2018) by Sophie Mackintosh; Larissa Lai's The Tiger Flu (2018); and also Diane Cook's The New Wilderness (2020).

== Themes ==
The novel explores themes of women's subjugation through sexual violence in a post-apocalyptic United States, often assuming roles of submission or as caretakers. The narrator chooses to avoid the fate of most other women in the novel, often using violence as a means of defense, and then later identifying ways to avoid violence and exploitation. Elison's book depicts the fate of women as either sexual enslaver or enslaved people; the unnamed midwife refuses to capitulate to either of these outcomes, choosing, rather, to dress and act male as a form of protection.

Kelly Jennings of Strange Horizons notes that:

"None of these sorts of narrative note that in a world without law, most men would also be property, subject to rape, their children enslaved, their voices silenced, their labor stolen. This does not fit the fantasy, and thus it is ignored. In these first two novels of her planned trilogy, Meg Elison directly confronts this default presumption of the 'natural' status of women".

== Critical response ==
The Book of the Unnamed Midwife received a starred review from Publishers Weekly for its "gripping and grim" story that's "beautifully written in a stripped down, understated way, though frequently gruesome in its depiction of rapes, murders, and stillbirths." The reviewers assess that it "should particularly appeal to readers of earlier feminist dystopias such as The Handmaid's Tale, Suzy McKee Charnas's Walk to the Edge of the World series, and P. D. James's The Children of Men."

Kirkus Reviews slightly disagreed, declaring it well written, though it

"does not really rise much above the rest of the teeming post-apocalyptic pack." Elaborating, the reviewers said "Similarly to The Handmaid's Tale and The Power, the book has a framing device set generations later in that same settlement, where the midwife’s journals are kept and she is venerated as a sacred figure. But confusingly, the story is not solely drawn from her journals; with no explanation, an omniscient narrator occasionally jumps in to reveal information that neither the midwife nor the future residents of the town could possibly know. While knowing the fates of the characters who pass out of the midwife's life provides closure, it also undercuts the integrity of the story."

== Awards ==
Year	Award	Category	Result	Refs
2014	Otherwise Award	—	Longlisted	
2015	Philip K. Dick Award	—	Won	
