= Meg Elison =

American author and feminist essayist

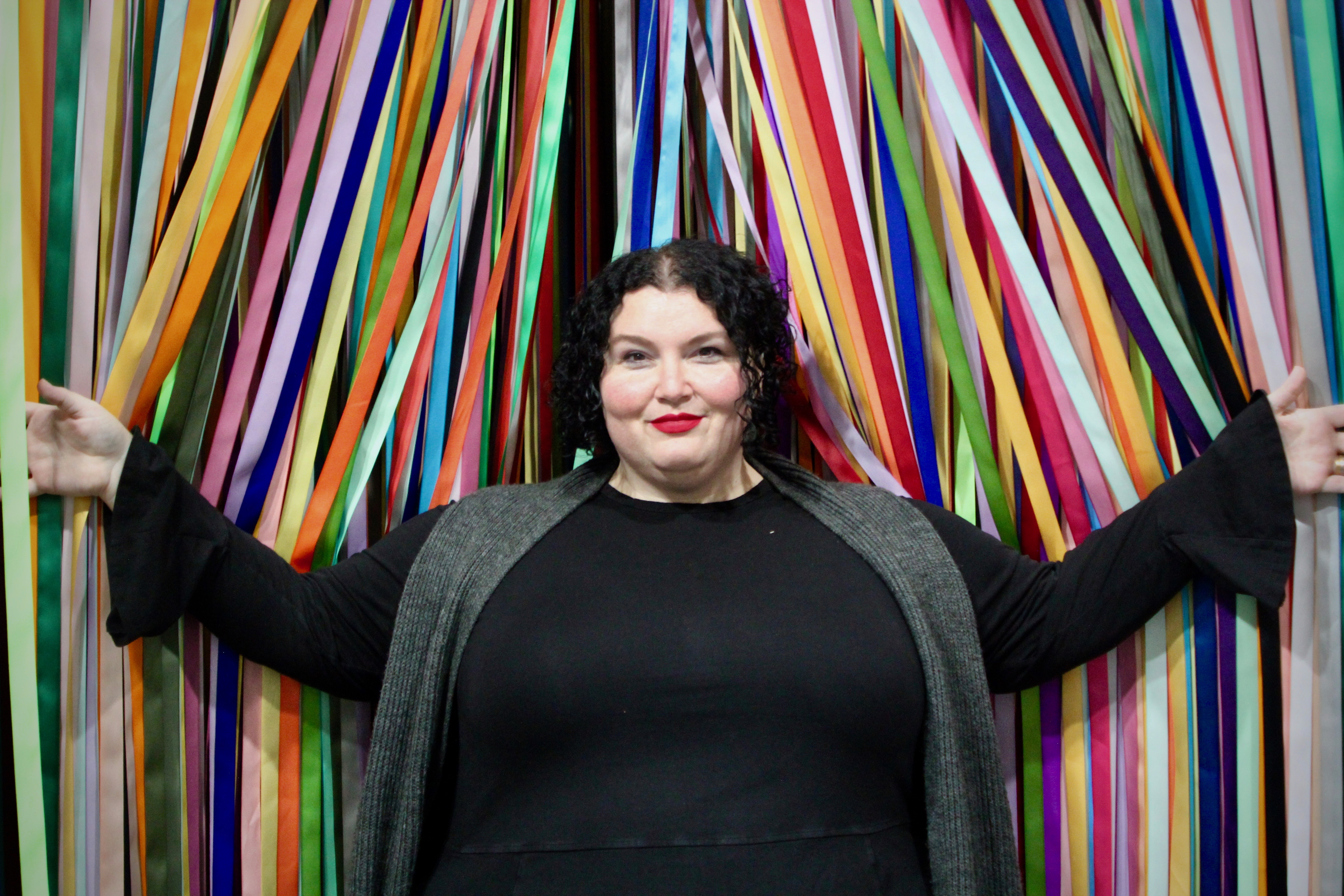
- Elison, at the San Francisco pop-up art exhibit Color Factory, 2017.
- Born: May 10, 1982 (age 44)
- Education: Mt. San Jacinto College; University of California, Berkeley (B.A.)
- Occupation: Writer
- Writing career
- Notable awards: Philip K. Dick Award
- Website: megelison.com

Meg Elison (born May 10, 1982) is an American author and feminist essayist whose writings often incorporate the themes of female empowerment, body positivity, and gender flexibility. Her debut novel, The Book of the Unnamed Midwife, won the 2014 Philip K. Dick Award, and her second novel, The Book of Etta, was nominated for the award in 2017. Elison's work has appeared in several markets, including Fantasy & Science Fiction, Terraform, McSweeney's Internet Tendency, Catapult, and Electric Literature.

Elison "grew up a military brat with the United States ARMY" where she "lived all over the country." At fourteen she began working to support herself. Elison has lived in Missouri, Savannah, Nevada, North Carolina, Utah, Southern California, and New York, contributing to her vast ability for distinct settings.

== Background ==
A high school dropout, Elison advanced through the California community college system and ultimately graduated from University of California, Berkeley (2014) with a B.A. in English. Before becoming a professional writer, non-fiction editor, and essayist, she had an interest in opera and medicine as possible vocations. She has written and spoken extensively on the poverty and early queer identity that came to inform much of her work.

Between 2014 and 2019, she published a trilogy of novels known as The Road to Nowhere, which detail the post-apocalyptic plight of women in the fallout of a global epidemic. Written primarily in a journal format, the first entry of the series, The Book of the Unnamed Midwife (June 2014), follows one surviving medical worker as she struggles to find civilization and to provide birth control and medical care to the women that she meets. The Book of Etta (February 2017) revisits the community of plague survivors several generations later as a female protagonist strikes out against an oppressive male-dominated regime. The third and final book of the series, The Book of Flora (April 2019), continues the story through the memories of Flora, a woman who was a sex slave.

Elison's first young adult novel, Find Layla (September 2020), centers on a teen suffering from neglect at home. Filming a video to shine a spotlight on the bitter truth of her treatment, the footage goes viral online, prompting Child Protective Services to investigate.

She is also winner of the 2021 Locus Award for Best Novelette for "The Pill", and she earned a nomination for its published collection Big Girl Plus....

== Awards/Nominations ==
Year	Work	Award	Category	Result	Refs
2014	The Book of the Unnamed Midwife	Otherwise Award	—	Longlisted	
2015	The Book of the Unnamed Midwife	Philip K. Dick Award	—	Won	
2017	The Book of Etta	Otherwise Award	—	Longlisted	
2018	The Book of Etta	Philip K. Dick Award	—	Shortlisted	
2018	"Big Girl"	Otherwise Award	—	Honor List	
2019	The Book of Flora	Otherwise Award	—	Honor List	
2020	"The Pill"	Nebula Award	Novelette	Shortlisted	
2021	"The Pill"	Hugo Award	Novelette	Shortlisted	
2021	"The Pill"	Locus Award	Novelette	Won	
2021	"The Pill"	Theodore Sturgeon Award	—	Shortlisted	
2021	Big Girl	Locus Award	Collection	Nominated–3rd	
2021	"Dresses Like White Elephants"	Locus Award	Short Story	Nominated–8th	
2022	"The Pizza Boy"	Locus Award	Short Story	Nominated–26th	
2022	"The Revolution Will Not Be Served with Fries"	Locus Award	Short Story	Nominated–12th	
2023	"The Little God of the Staircase"	Eugie Award	—	Shortlisted	

== Bibliography ==
=== Fictional Novels ===
The Road to Nowhere Trilogy:

- —— (2014). The Book of the Unnamed Midwife (paperback ed.). Sybaritic Press. pp. 1–190. ISBN 978-1495116360.
- —— (2017). The Book of Etta (paperback 1st ed.). 47North. pp. 1–314. ISBN 978-1503941823.
- —— (2019). The Book of Flora (paperback 1st ed.). 47North. pp. 1–332. ISBN 978-1542042093.

Other novels:

- —— (2020). Find Layla (hardcover 1st ed.). Skyscape. pp. 1–188. ISBN 978-1542019804.
- —— (2022). Number One Fan (hardcover 1st ed.). Harper Collins. pp. 1–352. ISBN 978-0778386155.
- —— (2026). Foundling Fathers (trade paperback ed.). Tachyon Publications. pp. 1–192. ISBN 978-1-61696-458-0.

=== Collections ===
- —— (2020). Big Girl Plus... (paperback ed.). PM Press. pp. 1–128. ISBN 978-1629637839.
  - "The Pill", a novelette, and the collection's centerpiece (previously unpublished)
  - "Big Girl", the eponymous short story
  - "Such People In It", speculative short fiction with alternative history elements (previously unpublished)
  - "Gone with Gone with the Wind", a non-fiction essay and discussion on revisiting and reassessing classic literature
  - "Guts", a short story about weight loss surgery
  - "El Hugé", a short story centering around a group of small-town teens requisitioning an overgrown pumpkin and destroying it
  - "Afterimage", an exploration of a VR world

=== Short fiction ===
- "Next of Kin" (2016)
- "Personal Trainer" (2016)
- "Nobody Told Me" (2016)
- "El Hugé" (2017)
- "In Loving Memory" (2017)
- "The Middle Child" (2017)
- "Big Girl" (2017)
- "Hysteria" (2017)
- "Matchmaker" (2017)
- "Safe Surrender" (2018)
- "Rapture" (2018)
- "Endor House" (2019)
- "Hey Alexa" (2019)
- "Come on Down" (2019)
- "Familiar Face" (2020)
- "Dresses Like White Elephants" (2020)
- "Such People in It" (2020)
- "The Pill" (2020)
- "Guess" (2020)
- "The Pizza Boy" (2021)
- "The Revolution Will Not Be Served with Fries" (2021)
- "Mother Dough" (2021)

=== Essays ===
- Writing with My Keys Between My Fingers, published in Uncanny (#32), Jan/Feb 2020

== External ==
- Official website
