= Ghost Radio =

Novel by Leopoldo Gout

- Author: Leopoldo Gout
- Audio read by: Pedro Pascal
- Illustrators: The Fates Crew; Leopoldo Gout
- Cover artist: Ervin Serrano and Don Sipley
- Language: English
- Genre: Horror
- Set in: Mexico
- Publisher: HarperCollins
- Publication date: 2008-10-14
- Publication place: United States
- Pages: 368
- ISBN: 9780061242687
- LC Class: PS3607.O895 G47
- Website: https://www.leopoldogout.com/books/ghost-radio

Ghost Radio is the debut novel from author Leopoldo Gout, a film producer, film director, graphic novelist, writer, and composer. Ghost Radio was published in 2008 by HarperCollins. The audiobook version was narrated by Pedro Pascal.

== Description ==
Ghost Radio centers around Joaquin, a former punk rocker and the melancholy host of "Ghost Radio", a late-night Mexican radio show during which listeners call in and share ghost stories or their own paranormal experiences. Sharing the airwaves with Joaquin are his beautiful Goth girlfriend Alondra, the show's resident "scientific expert" thanks to her advanced degree in urban folklore, and Watt, Joaquin's sound engineer and friend. Joaquin is haunted by death after both his parents and his best friend Gabriel were killed in separate, horrific accidents that Joaquin himself survived, but things appear to be looking up: a conglomerate becomes interested in syndicating Ghost Radio to the United States and providing Joaquin with a much larger, mainstream audience beyond his local, devoted followers. With the additional attention brought on by his increasing popularity, Joaquin reluctantly engages in an interview about his program with Newsweek magazine.

When the magazine's fact-checkers have trouble verifying Joaquin's explanation on the inspiration behind Ghost Radio, Joaquin's sense of reality and his own past become distinctly murkier. A troubling sequence of events begins to unfold as Joaquin finds himself slipping deeper and deeper into not only his listener's stories but his own confused, paranoid mind. Joaquin has a harder and harder time telling the world of the living apart from that of the nightmarish dead, and repeated visits from someone in his past make that task even more difficult and dangerous. With his control over reality slipping and nearly gone, Joaquin must confront his past and his own mortality to save what is most important to him.

== Reception ==
Most critics responded with enthusiasm to Gout's debut. James Patterson described it in Kirkus Reviews as "A first novel that moves with deserved confidence into Stephen King territory … Palpable, almost visible cross-cultural creepiness that never lets up: very smart thrills..." A review for Library Journal called it "A thrilling literary and visual experience, this contemporary ghost story set in Mexico is a fast-moving and enjoyable read. The story and writing style recall early Stephen King and Joe Hill's Heart-Shaped Box..."

Publishers Weekly found that "[t]he prose can be awkward at times" and said "Gout adds little that's either new or remarkable to the ghostly radio waves premise".

== Awards and nominations ==
- 2009 Audie Awards: Best Science Fiction or Fantasy Audio Book (Nominated)
