= Crypticon =

- Status: Active
- Genre: Horror and media
- Locations: Denver, CO Kansas City, MO Minneapolis, MN
- Country: United States
- Years active: 2006 to present
- Attendance: 2,000-6,000
- Organizer: Crypticon Conventions
- Website: crypticonconvention.com

Crypticon is a horror-oriented media convention held annually in Minneapolis, Minnesota, Seattle, Washington, and Kansas City, Missouri. Guests have included authors, actors, directors, producers, designers, and writers from classic and upcoming horror titles.

== Overview ==
Crypticon is composed of three areas open to the general public:

- The Dealers' Area, which is made up primarily of vendors selling horror-themed merchandise and booths advertising films, and guests signing and meeting fans;
- The Auditorium, where panels and speeches are given for the duration of the convention, including exclusive interviews with the guests; and
- The Screening Rooms, where new independent and mainstream horror films are screened via digital projection.

== Conventions ==
=== 2017 ===
Happy Hunting wins Best Feature Film.

=== 2014 ===
Crypticon Seattle was held May 23–25, 2014 at Seatac Hilton Hotel and Convention center in Seattle, Washington.

=== 2013 ===
On May 24–26, 2013, Crypticon Seattle took place at the Seatac Hilton Hotel in Seatac, Washington.

Guests of Honor

- Cassandra Peterson
- Fred Williamson
- John Carl Buechler
- Nicholas Brendon
- Josh Stewart
- Diane Franklin
- Tyler Mane
- Derek Mears
- Joe Bob Briggs
- Dana Ashbrook
- Lew Temple
- Eileen Dietz
- James Duvall
- Vincent M. Ward

Crypticon Kansas City was held Aug 16-18 in Kansas City, Missouri.

Guests of Honor

- Sid Haig
- Bill Moseley
- Tom Savini
- Ernie Hudson
- Margot Kidder
- Ken Foree
- Debbie Rochon
- William Forsythe
- Bai Ling
- C. Thomas Howell
- R.A. Mihailoff
- Tiffany Shepis
- Fred Williamson
- Richard Kiel
- Lew Temple
- Doug Jones
- John Carl Buechler

Crypticon Minnesota was held September 27–29 at the Doubletree in Bloomington, Minnesota.

Guests of Honor

- Billy Dee Williams
- Ted Raimi
- Stephen Constantino
- Cory Dee Williams
- Dan Payne
- Don Coscarelli
- Kathryn Leigh Scott
- Betsy Baker
- Ellen Sandweiss
- Theresa Tilly
- Adrian Paul

=== 2012 ===
On May 27–29, Crypticon Seattle took place at the Seatac Hilton Hotel in Seatac, Washington.

Guests of Honor

- Doug Bradley
- Dee Wallace
- J. Larose
- Richard Kiel
- Voltaire
- Marilyn Burns
- Ricou Browning
- Don Coscarelli
- Sonny Landham
- James O'Barr
- Gangrel
- Cerina Vincent
- Danielle Harris
- Robert Jayne

Crypticon Minnesota was held September 28–30 in Minneapolis, Minnesota.

Guests of Honor

- Sid Haig
- Tom Savini
- Tony Curran
- Peter Shinkoda
- Richard Kiel
- Cerina Vincent
- Sean Whalen
- Robert Jayne
- Taso Stavrakis
- David Hedison
- Richard Brooker
- Melanie Kinnaman

=== 2011 ===
On May 27–29, Crypticon Seattle took place at the Seatac Hilton Hotel in Seatac, Washington.

Guests of Honor

- Bill Moseley
- Linnea Quigley
- P. J. Soles
- Andrew Bryniarski
- Barbara Magnolfi
- Philip Nutman
- C. J. Graham
- Jewel Shepard
- Alex Vincent
- David Katims
- Tom Fridley
- Aaron Smolinski
- Frank Dux

=== 2010 ===
On June 18–20, 2010, the Crypticon Seattle Horror Convention took place at the Holiday Inn in Everett, Washington.

Guests of Honor - Seattle

- Margot Kidder
- Doug Jones
- Kane Hodder
- Ernie Hudson
- Camden Toy
- Nick Mamatas
- John Skipp
- Cody Goodfellow
- Felissa Rose
- Heather Langenkamp
- Andras Jones
- Brooke Bundy
- Rodney Eastman

Crypticon Minnesota was November 5, 6 and 7, 2010 in Bloomington, Minnesota at the Bloomington Sheraton.

Guests of Honor - Minnesota

- Jeffrey Combs
- Bruce Abbott
- Kathleen Kinmont
- Dee Wallace
- Brian Krause
- Jason Lively
- Tom Sullivan
- Walter Phelan
- Jake McKinnon
- Sean Clark

=== Past conventions ===
==== 2009 ====
On June 5–7, 2009, the Crypticon Seattle Horror Convention took place at the Northwest Rooms at Seattle Center in Seattle, Washington.

Guests of Honor

- Doug Jones (Hellboy)
- Don Coscarelli (Phantasm, Bubba Ho Tep)
- Bill Thornbury (Phantasm)
- Reggie Bannister (Phantasm)
- Adrienne Barbeau (The Fog)
- Tom Atkins (The Fog)
- Charles Cyphers (Halloween, The Fog)
- Nancy Loomis (Halloween, The Fog)
- Ken Foree (Dawn Of The Dead)
- Electra and Elise Avellan (Grindhouse)
- Michael Berryman (The Hills Have Eyes)
- Bob Elmore (Texas Chainsaw Massacre 2)
- Brian Sipe (FX Lord Of Illusions, Cirque Du Freak)
- Lloyd Kaufman (Troma Pictures)
- Carleton Mellick III (gonzo author)
- Charlotte J. Helmkamp (Frankenhooker)
- Brooke Lewis (scream queen)
- Eileen Dietz (The Exorcist)
- Tiffany Shepis (scream queen, Troma actress, Bonnie And Clyde vs. Dracula)
- Bob L. Morgan (shock fiction author)
- Troy Holbrook (Bodybag Photography and FX)

==== 2008 ====
On May 23–25, 2008, the Crypticon Seattle Horror Convention took place at the DoubleTree Hotel in SeaTac, Washington.

Guests of Honor

- Bill Moseley
- William Forsythe
- Danielle Harris
- Mark Kidwell
- Adrienne King
- Jason Mewes
- Sid Haig
- Ari Lehman
- Betsy Palmer
- Tony Todd
- Roddy Piper
