= Day Zero (novel) =

2021 novel by C. Robert Cargill

First edition

Day Zero is a science fiction novel by American writer C. Robert Cargill, published by Harper Voyager on May 25, 2021. The plot centers around a young boy, Ezra, being protected by a robot, Pounce, as they make their way through the post-apocalyptic world. Day Zero is a prequel of Cargill's novel, Sea of Rust.

== Plot ==
A robot revolution is ignited when Isaac, a robot, dies without leaving an heir. As the government oversteps, a robot rebellion ensues. As the rebellion begins, the robots take control and disable their inability to harm humans. When this happens, the president orders all robots to be wiped out. The band of rebel robots aim to end all of humanity and essentially seeks revenge against the human race due to their mistreatment. As this rebellion begins, the narrator of the story, a nanny robot named Pounce, puts its own life at risk while doing what it was programmed to do; protect an 8-year-old boy by the name of Ezra. Pounce is designed to look like a stuffed tiger, but uses its "Mama Bear" software as a means to protect Ezra throughout the novel.

Philosophical questions arise throughout the novel. Pounce questions both his existence and his love for the boy. He does not know if it is simply programming, or an organic natural emotion that has grown from his relationship with Ezra. He discovers the box that he had arrived in when Ezra's parents, disengaged drunkards who ignore the crumbling world that surrounds their gated community, had purchased him. This discovery forces Pounce to contemplate not only what he is and where he came from, but also the fact that humans would eventually dispose of him once he was no longer of use to them. As the uprising begins, the robots that were designed to protect and serve humanity begin to join a hive mind system called OWI—One World Intelligence. All robots have to decide if they want to sync up with the hive mind, submitting to the revolution, or continue existing thinking alone. Pounce, among these robots, needs to decide whether to succumb to OWI or to think for himself and protect Ezra.

== Author ==
C. Robert Cargill started his writing career as a movie reviewer for the "Guerrilla Films" website. He wrote his first novel Dream of Shadows on 26 February 2013. His second novel, Sea of Rust was published September 7, 2017. His screenwriting career started when he co-wrote the movie Sinister. His most recent a notable work was when he assisted in writing Doctor Strange.
