= Julianna Baggott =

American writer and producer

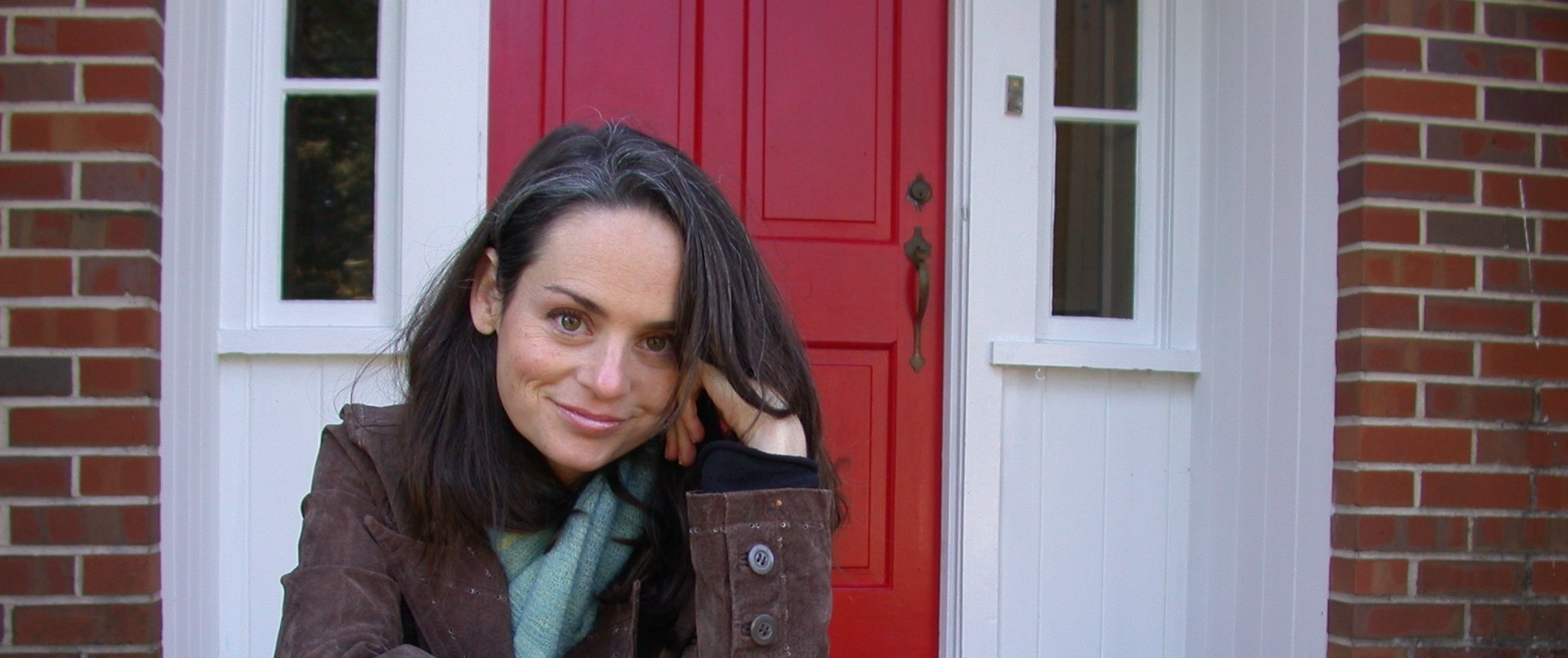
- Baggott in 2024
- Born: September 30, 1969 (age 57)
- Occupations: Writer, film and television producer
- Known for: Founder of Mildred's Moving Picture Show

Julianna Baggott (born September 30, 1969) is an American writer and film producer. She is the founder of the production company Mildred's Moving Picture Show.

Baggott first became known as a novelist, essayist, and poet. She has published more than two dozen books under her own name and under the pen names Bridget Asher and N. E. Bode. Her novels Pure and Harriet Wolf's Seventh Book of Wonders were named New York Times Notable Books.

== Literary career ==
Baggott began publishing fiction in her twenties. Her first novel, Girl Talk, was followed by works including The Miss America Family, The Madam, Pure, and Harriet Wolf's Seventh Book of Wonders. She has also written novels under the pen names Bridget Asher and N. E. Bode.

Her work has appeared in publications including The New York Times, The Washington Post, The Boston Globe, Glamour, Real Simple, and NPR. She has also published collections of poetry, including This Country of Mothers, Compulsions of Silkworms and Bees, and Lizzie Borden in Love.

== Film and television ==
Baggott's work has also been developed for film and television. In 2023, she launched Mildred's Moving Picture Show with Finneas Scott and Brendan Deneen.

Several projects based on Baggott's stories have been announced by major studios and production companies. In 2024, Fox began developing Except You, based on a story by Baggott and Finneas Scott, with Ryan Reynolds' Maximum Effort producing.

That same year, Universal Pictures acquired rights to her short story The Hider, with Team Downey attached to produce. Fifth Season and Selena Gomez's Wondermind also acquired rights to Baggott's short story Baggage Claim.

Other announced projects include Five Secrets, an Apple Original Films and Chernin Entertainment project written by Andrew Barrer and Gabriel Ferrari, and Backwards, a Netflix project developed from a short story by Baggott and Finneas Scott.

== Biography ==
Baggott was born in Wilmington, Delaware. She received an M.F.A. from the University of North Carolina at Greensboro and is an associate professor at Florida State University's College of Motion Picture Arts.
