= The Year's Best Science Fiction: Twenty-Sixth Annual Collection =

2009 anthology edited by Gardner Dozois

- Editor: Gardner Dozois
- Language: English
- Series: The Year's Best Science Fiction
- Genre: Science fiction
- Publisher: St. Martin's Press
- Publication date: June 23, 2009
- Publication place: United States
- Media type: Print (hardcover & trade paperback)
- Pages: 688 pp
- ISBN: 9780312551049
- OCLC: 276335024
- Preceded by: The Year's Best Science Fiction: Twenty-Fifth Annual Collection
- Followed by: The Year's Best Science Fiction: Twenty-Seventh Annual Collection

The Year's Best Science Fiction: Twenty-Sixth Annual Collection is a science fiction anthology edited by Gardner Dozois that was published on June 23, 2009. It is the 26th in The Year's Best Science Fiction series.

== Contents ==
The book includes 30 stories, all that were first published in 2008. The book also includes a summation by Dozois, a two-paragraph introduction to each story by Dozois and a referenced list of honorable mentions for the year. The stories are as follows:

- Stephen Baxter: "Turing's Apples"
- Michael Swanwick: "From Babel's Fall'n Glory We Fled"
- Paolo Bacigalupi: "The Gambler"
- Elizabeth Bear and Sarah Monette: "Boojum"
- Alastair Reynolds: "The Six Directions of Space"
- Ted Kosmatka: "N-Words"
- Ian McDonald: "An Eligible Boy"
- Dominic Green: "Shining Armour"
- Karl Schroeder: "The Hero"
- Mary Robinette Kowal: "Evil Robot Monkey"
- Robert Reed: "Five Thrillers"
- Jay Lake: "The Sky That Wraps the World Round, Past the Blue and Into the Black"
- Paul McAuley: "Incomers"
- Greg Egan: "Crystal Nights"
- Mary Rosenblum: "The Egg Man"
- Hannu Rajaniemi: "His Master's Voice"
- Charles Coleman Finlay: "The Political Prisoner"
- James L. Cambias: "Balancing Accounts"
- Maureen F. McHugh: "Special Economics"
- Geoff Ryman: "Days of Wonder"
- Paul McAuley: "The City of the Dead"
- Gwyneth Jones: "The Voyage Out"
- Daryl Gregory: "The Illustrate Biography of Lord Grimm"
- Kristine Kathryn Rusch: "G-Men"
- Nancy Kress: "The Erdmann Nexus"
- Garth Nix: "Old Friends"
- James Alan Gardner: "The Ray-Gun: A Love Story"
- Gord Sellar: "Lester Young and the Jupiter's Moons' Blues"
- Aliette de Bodard: "Butterfly, Falling at Dawn"
- Ian McDonald: "The Tear"

== Release details ==
- 2009, United States, St. Martin's Press ISBN 978-0-312-55104-9, Pub date June 2009, Hardcover
- 2009, United States, St. Martin's Griffin ISBN 978-0-312-55105-6, Pub date June 2009, Trade paperback
- 2009, United States, St. Martin's Griffin ISBN 978-1-4299-8537-6, Pub date June 2009, ebook
