= 2020 in science fiction =

In 2020, the following events occurred in science fiction.

== Deaths ==
- Mike Resnick, author
- Christopher Tolkien, editor and author
- Carlos Ruiz Zafón, author
- Terry Goodkind, author
- Richard A. Lupoff, author
- Ben Bova, author
- Dean Ing, author
- Phyllis Eisenstein, author
- James E. Gunn, author and editor

== Literary releases ==
=== Novels ===
- Providence, Max Barry
- Chosen Spirits, Samit Basu
- Tender Is the Flesh, Agustina Bazterrica
- Machine, Elizabeth Bear
- Ghost Species, James Bradley
- Failed State, Christopher Brown
- The Book of Koli, M. R. Carey
- Bridge 108, Anne Charnock
- Attack Surface, Cory Doctorow
- City Under the Stars, Gardner Dozois & Michael Swanwick
- Unconquerable Sun, Kate Elliott
- Agency, William Gibson
- Anthropocene Rag, Alex Irvine
- The Vanished Birds, Simon Jimenez
- The Space Between Worlds, Micaiah Johnson
- The Relentless Moon, Mary Robinette Kowal
- The Eleventh Gate, Nancy Kress
- The Arrest, Jonathan Lethem
- War of the Maps, Paul J. McAuley
- Pacific Storm, Linda Nagata
- Driving the Deep, Suzanne Palmer
- The Evidence, Christopher Priest
- Bone Silence, Alastair Reynolds
- The Ministry for the Future, Kim Stanley Robinson
- The Last Emperox, John Scalzi
- Network Effect, Martha Wells
- Fleet Elements, Walter Jon Williams
- Interlibrary Loan, Gene Wolfe
- Interior Chinatown, Charles Yu

== Movies ==
- Altered Carbon: Resleeved
- Black Box
- Fried Barry
- Friend of the World
- Greenland
- Invisible Man
- Last and First Men
- Love and Monsters
- The Mitchells vs. the Machines
- Palm Springs
- Platform
- Possessor
- Songbird
- Sputnik
- Tenet

== TV Series ==
- Appare-Ranman!
- Avenue 5
- Brave New World
- Deca-Dence
- Devs
- Ghost in the Shell SAC_2045
- The Midnight Gospel
- Snowpiercer
- Solar Opposites
- Space Force
- Star Trek: Lower Decks
- Star Trek: Picard
- Tales from the Loop
- Y: The Last Man

== Video games ==
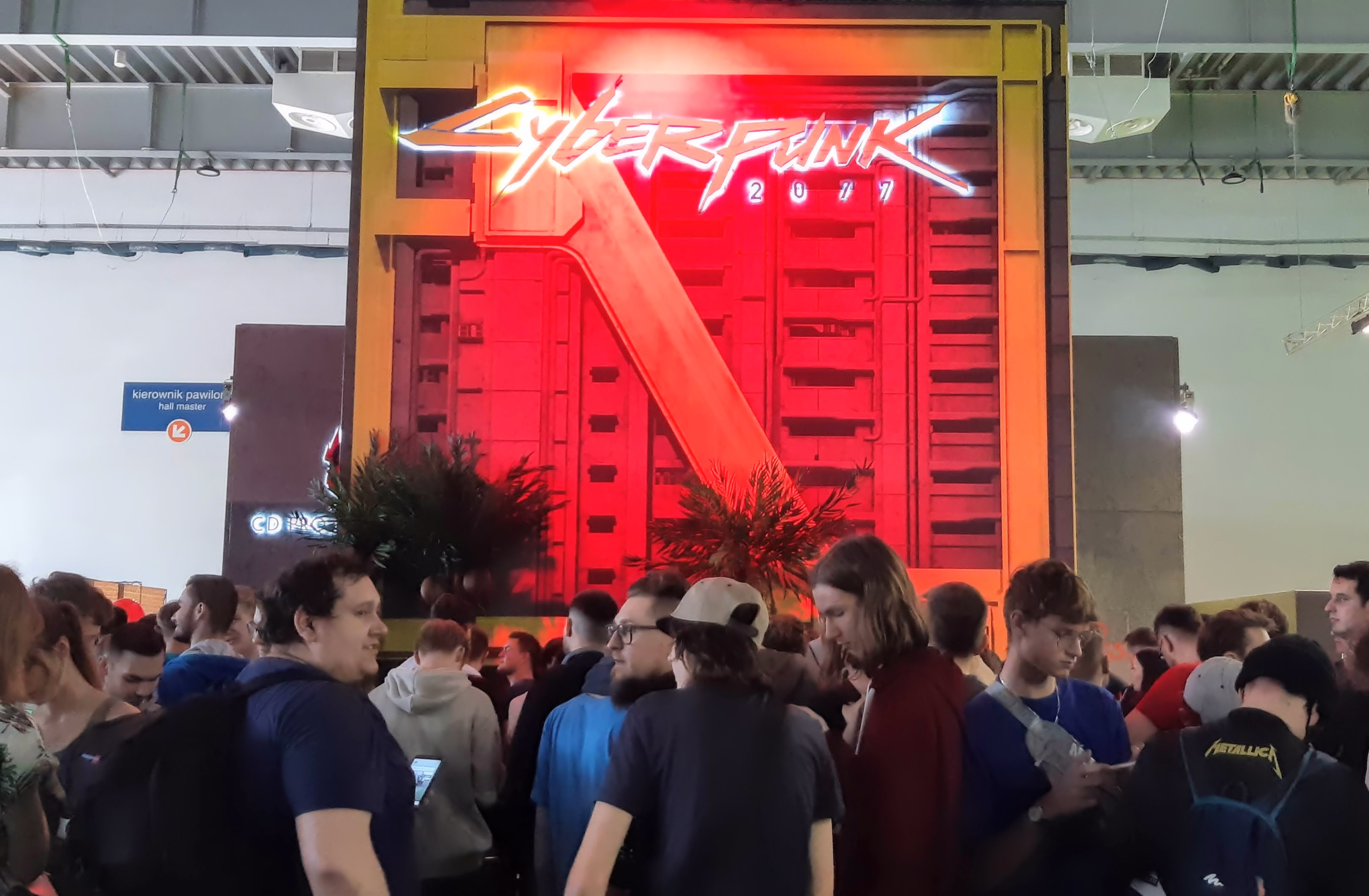
A Cyberpunk 2077 presentation

- Astro's Playroom
- Cyberpunk 2077
- DOOM Eternal
- Half-Life: Alyx
- The Last of Us Part II
- Wasteland 3

== See also ==
Preceded by 2019	2020	Succeeded by 2021
