= 2019 in science fiction =

In 2019 the following events occurred in science fiction.

== Deaths ==
- April 1 – Vonda N. McIntyre, American writer (born 1948)
- Erik Olin Wright, sociologist and futurologist
- Yuri Artsutanov, pioneer of the space elevator idea
- Carol Emshwiller, writer

== Literary releases ==
=== Novels ===
- The City in the Middle of the Night by Charlie Jane Anders
- Ancestral Night by Elizabeth Bear
- The Light Brigade by Kameron Hurley
- Luna: Moon Rising by Ian McDonald
- Tiamat's Wrath by James S. A. Corey
- Motherland by Lauren Beukes
- English translation of The Waste Tide by Chen Qiufan
- Exhalation: Stories by Ted Chiang
- Children of Ruin by Adrian Tchaikovsky
- Wanderers by Chuck Wendig
- Dark Age by Pierce Brown
- English translation of The Redemption of Time by Baoshu
- Vigilance by Robert Jackson Bennett
- Hierophant by Robert Jackson Bennett
- The Testaments by Margaret Atwood
- The Future of Another Timeline by Annalee Newitz
- Famous Men Who Never Lived by K Chess
- The Lesson by Cadwell Turnbull
- A Memory Called Empire by Arkady Martine
- This Is How You Lose the Time War by Amal El-Mohtar and Max Gladstone
- Alliance Rising by C. J. Cherryh and Jane S. Fancher
- Perihelion Summer by Greg Egan
- Permafrost by Alastair Reynolds
- Do You Dream of Terra-Two? by Temi Oh
- The Last Astronaut by David Wellington
- A Song for a New Day by Sarah Pinsker
- Here and Now and Then by Mike Chen

=== Stories collections ===
- American Science Fiction: Eight Classic Novels of the 1960s by Gary K. Wolfe (ed.)
- Broken Stars: Contemporary Chinese Science Fiction in Translation by Ken Liu (ed.)

== Films ==
=== Original ===
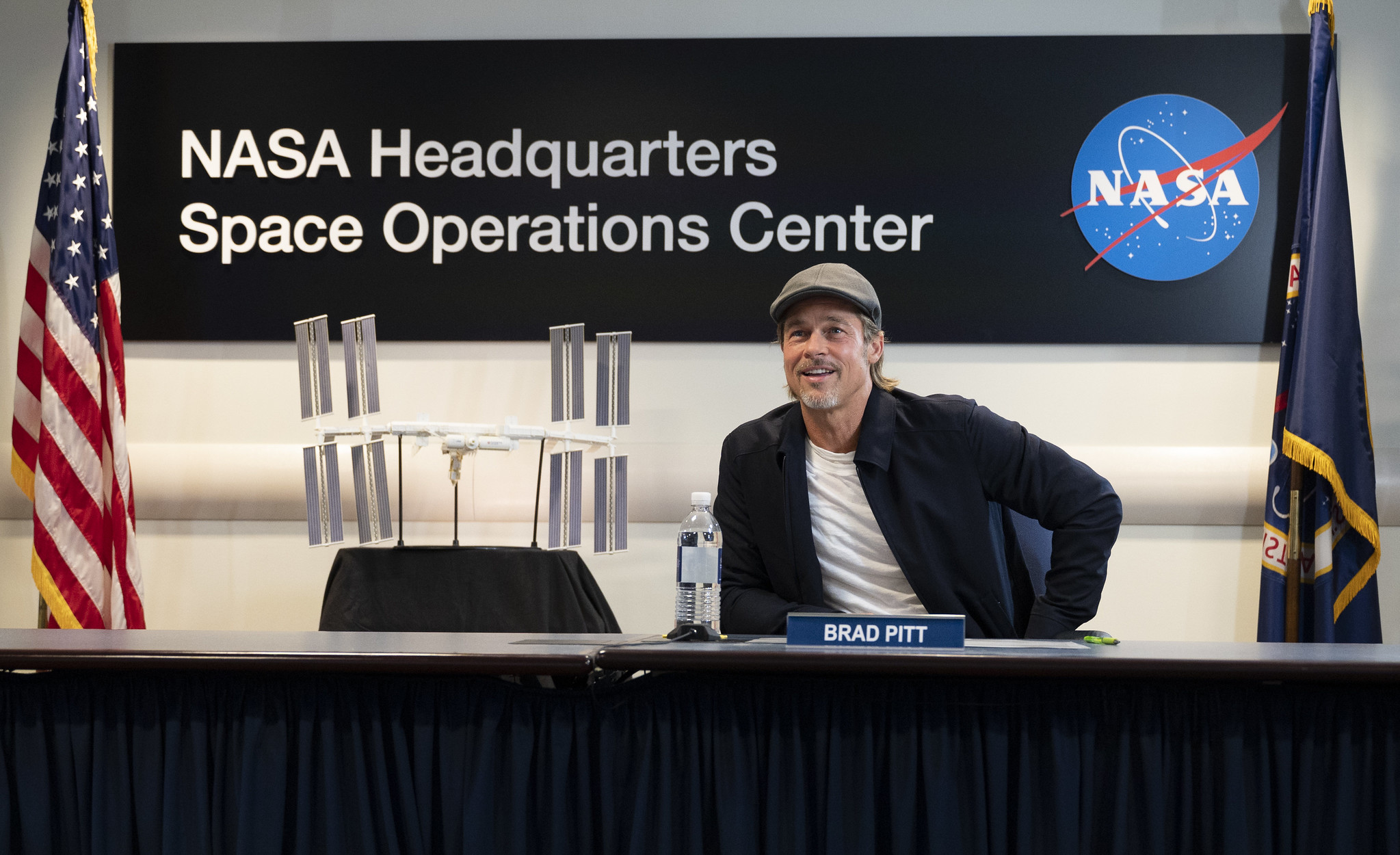
Actor Brad Pitt at NASA Headquarters promoting film Ad Astra

- 3022
- 9
- Ad Astra
- Alita: Battle Angel
- The Blackout
- Boss Level
- Brightburn
- Captive State
- Chaos Walking
- Doraemon: Nobita's Chronicle of the Moon Exploration
- Escape Room
- Farmageddon: A Shaun the Sheep Movie
- Fast & Furious Presents: Hobbs & Shaw
- Fast Color
- Gemini Man
- Goalkeeper of the Galaxy
- Happy Death Day 2U
- I Am Mother
- Io
- Kabaneri of the Iron Fortress: The Battle of Unato
- Kizhakku Africavil Raju
- Lucy in the Sky
- Princess Principal
- Psycho-Pass: Sinners of the System
- Relive
- Serenity
- Short Circuit
- Spies in Disguise
- The Last Boy
- Paradise Hills
- Proxima
- Ultraman R/B the Movie
- The Vast of Night
- The Wandering Earth
- Warriors of Future

=== Sequels, spin-offs and remakes ===
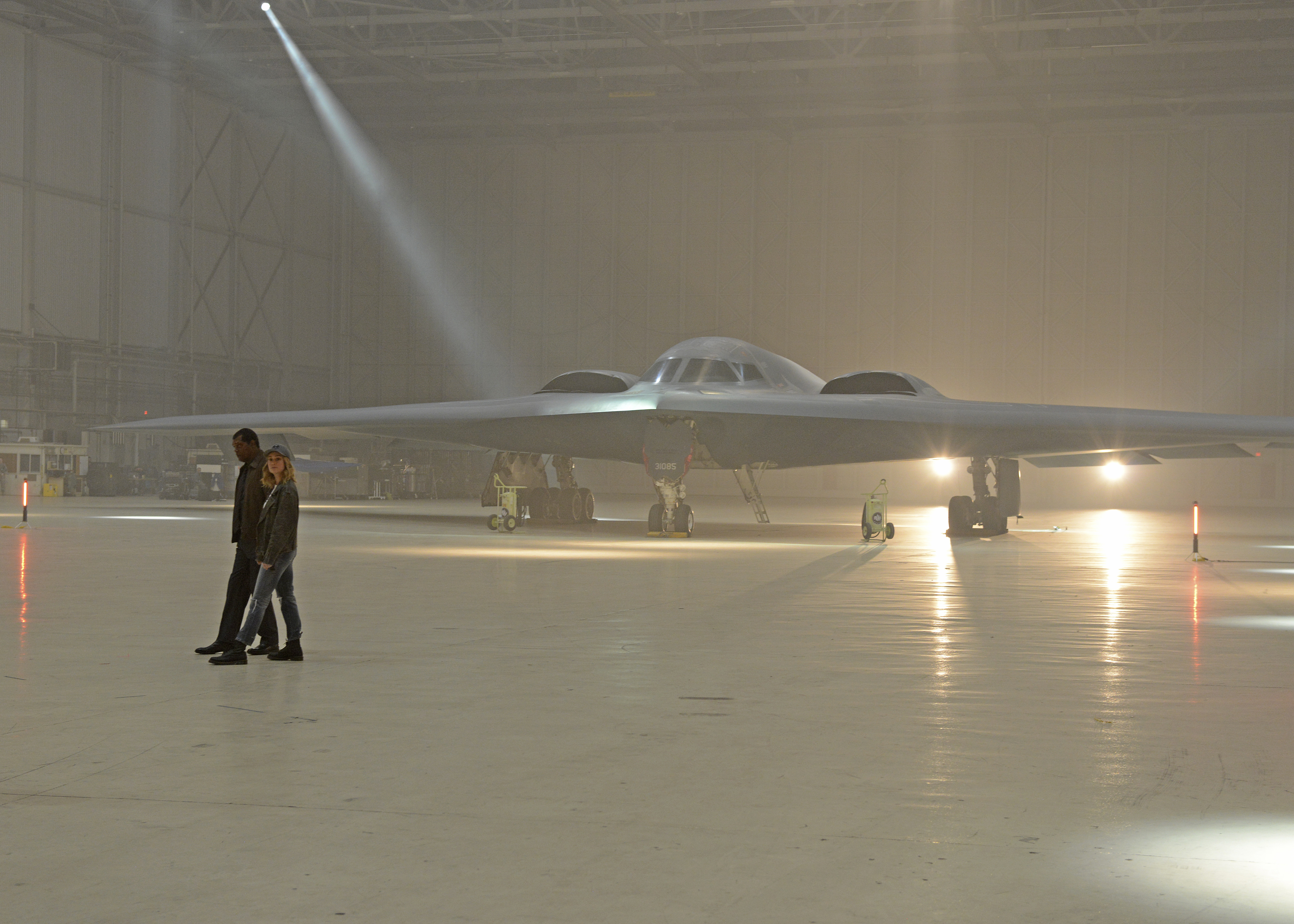
Film set of Captain Marvel

- Avengers: Endgame
- Captain Marvel
- Code 8
- Code Geass: Lelouch of the Re;surrection
- Glass
- Godzilla: King of the Monsters
- Hellboy
- Iron Sky: The Coming Race
- The Lego Movie 2: The Second Part
- Men in Black: International
- Pokémon: Detective Pikachu
- Reign of the Supermen
- Sonic the Hedgehog
- Spider-Man: Far From Home
- Star Wars: The Rise of Skywalker
- Terminator: Dark Fate
- Shazam!
- X-Men: Dark Phoenix

== Television ==
=== New series ===
- My Absolute Boyfriend
- The Boys
- Doom Patrol
- Gen:Lock
- Good Omens
- His Dark Materials
- The I-Land
- Memories of the Alhambra
- October Faction
- The Passage
- Project Blue Book
- Roswell, New Mexico
- See
- Snowpiercer
- Star Trek: Picard
- Star Wars: The Mandalorian
- Swamp Thing
- The War of the Worlds (British TV series)
- The War of the Worlds (American TV series)
- Warrior Nun
- Watchmen
- Weird City

=== Returning series ===
- The 100, season 6
- 3%, season 3
- Black Mirror, season 5
- Cloak & Dagger, season 2
- Cosmos: Possible Worlds
- Dark, season 2
- The Expanse, season 4
- The Handmaid's Tale, season 3
- Jessica Jones, season 3
- Kishiryu Sentai Ryusoulger
- Krypton, season 2
- Legion, season 3
- Nightflyers, season 2
- Power Rangers Beast Morphers
- The Orville, season 2
- The Punisher, season 2
- Runaways, season 2
- She-Ra and the Princesses of Power, season 2
- Star Trek: Discovery, season 2
- Stranger Things, season 3
- Super Sentai Strongest Battle
- The Twilight Zone
- Transformers: Rescue Bots Academy
- Ultraman
- Ultraman New Generation Chronicle
- Van Helsing, season 4
- Young Justice, season 3

== Video games ==
- Anthem
- Apex Legends
- Control
- Crackdown 3
- Gears 5
- Halo Infinite
- Marvel's Spider-Man
- The Outer Worlds
- Rebel Galaxy Outlaw
- Star Wars Jedi: Fallen Order
- The Surge 2

== Awards ==
- Sorry to Bother You made it onto the list of Top Ten Independent Films of 2018 by the National Board of Review of Motion Pictures

== Other events ==
- Mir Fantastiki magazine was relaunched by the new publisher, Hobby World.

== See also ==
Preceded by 2018	2019	Succeeded by 2020
