= 2018 in science fiction =

In 2018, the following events occurred in science fiction.

== Deaths ==
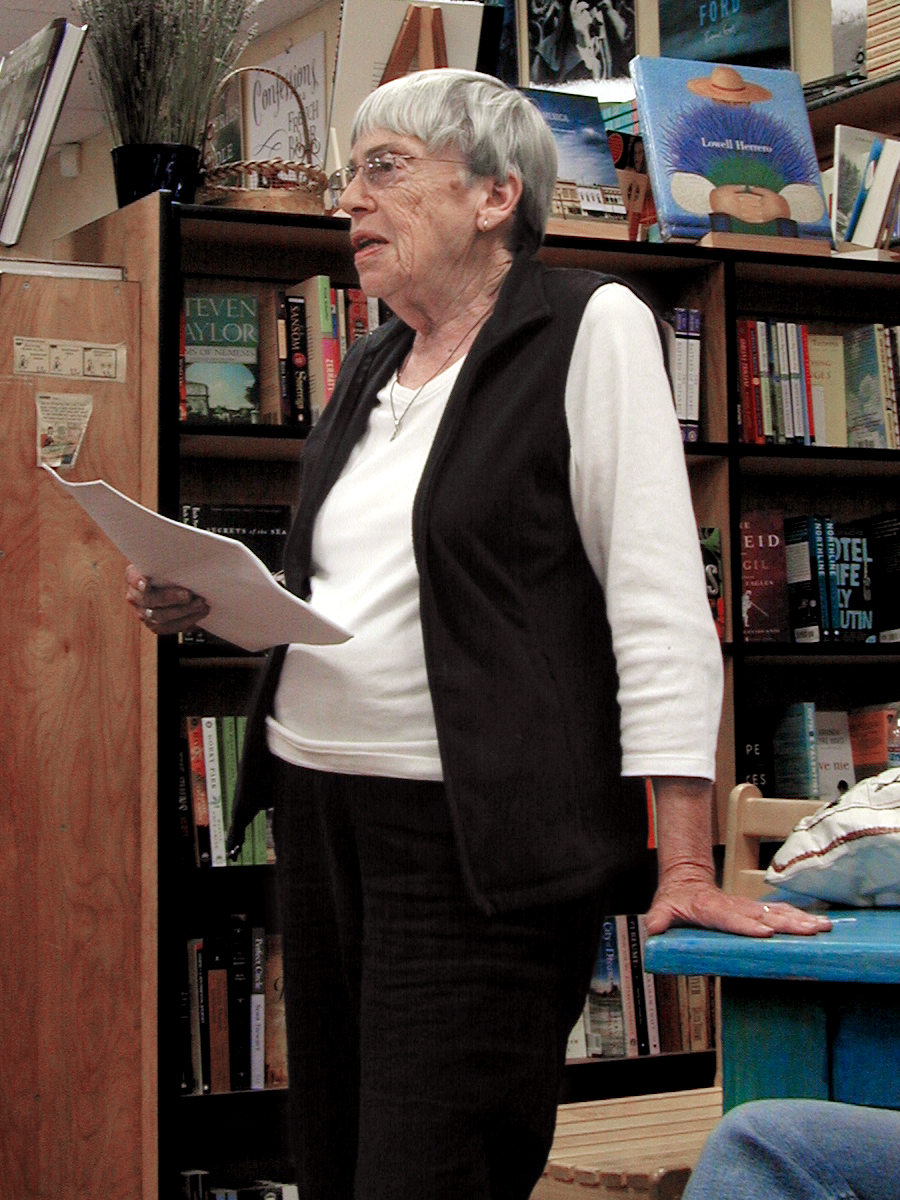
Writer Ursula Le Guin died in 2018

- March 8 – Kate Wilhelm, American writer (born 1928)
- Ursula K. Le Guin, a writer of science fiction and fantasy (Hainish Cycle in particular).
- Stephen Hawking, an astrophysicist and writer who greatly influenced science fiction; co-author of children's sci-fi book series George.
- Gardner Dozois, a writer and editor
- Harlan Ellison, a writer.
- Stan Lee, a comic book writer.
- Dave Duncan, writer
- Bertil Mårtensson, writer and philosopher
- Mary Rosenblum, writer
- Helen Mary Hoover, writer
- Michael Anderson, director
- Christopher Stasheff, writer
- David F. Bischoff, writer
- Eddy C. Bertin, writer
- Eric Koch, writer and academic
- Gerald M. Weinberg, writer and computer scientist

== Literary releases ==
- Artificial Condition by Martha Wells
- Ball Lightning by Liu Cixin
- The Calculating Stars by Mary Robinette Kowal
- The Consuming Fire by John Scalzi
- The Freeze-Frame Revolution by Peter Watts
- Head On by John Scalzi
- Luna: Moon Rising by Ian McDonald
- Mutiny at Vesta by R.E. Stearns
- Record of a Spaceborn Few by Becky Chambers
- Space Opera by Catherynne M. Valente
- Thrawn: Alliances by Timothy Zahn
- The Book of M by Peng Shepherd

== Films ==
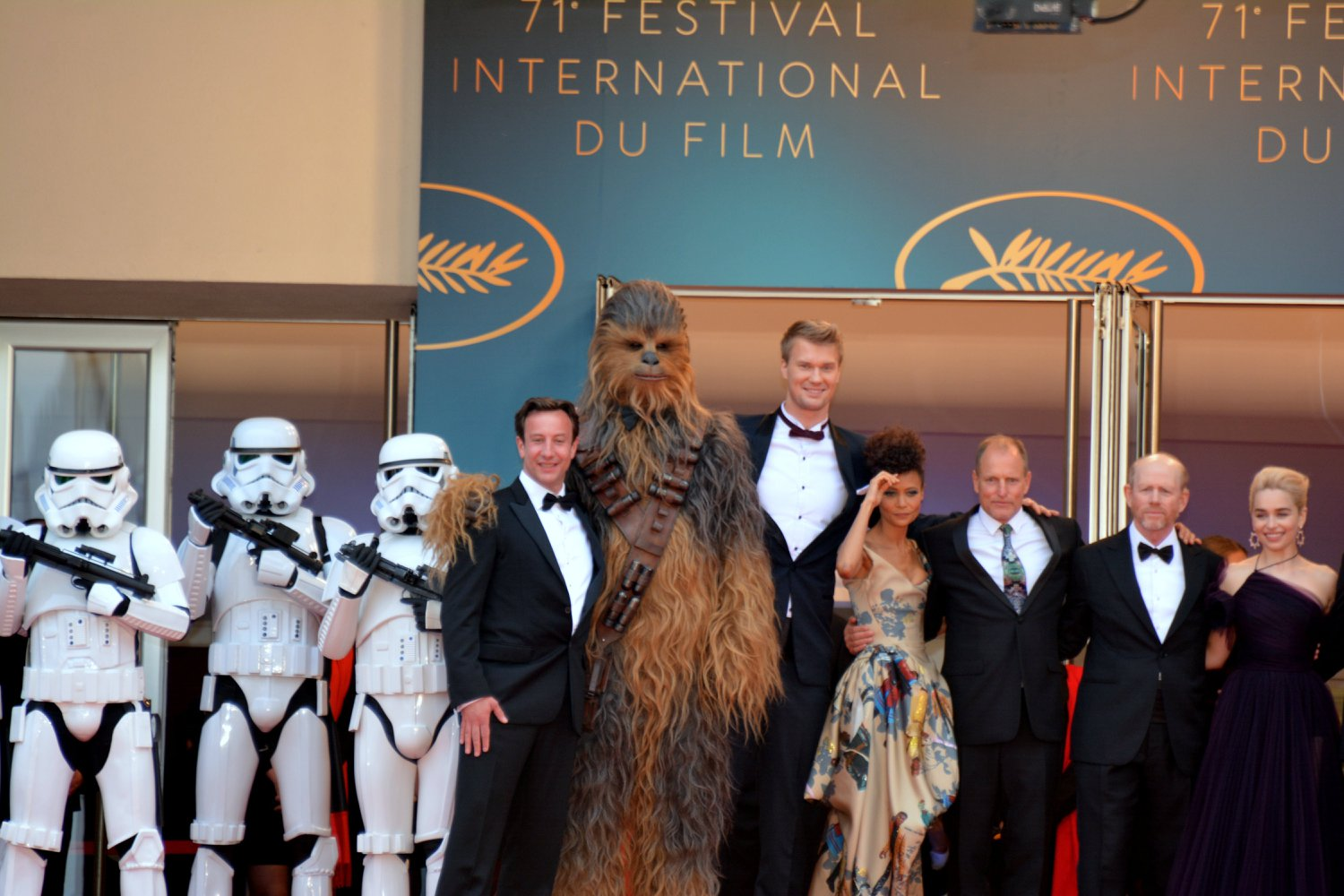
Solo cast and crew

=== Original ===
- Annihilation
- Anon
- A.X.L.
- The Darkest Minds
- Extinction
- Fahrenheit 451
- Future World
- High Life
- Hotel Artemis
- I Think We're Alone Now
- Kin
- The Meg
- Mortal Engines
- Mute
- Prospect
- A Quiet Place
- Rampage
- Ready Player One
- Replicas
- A Rough Draft (Chernovik)
- Sorry to Bother You
- Tau
- The Titan
- Next Gen (film)

=== Sequels, spin-offs and remakes ===
- 6-Headed Shark Attack
- Alita: Battle Angel
- Ant-Man and the Wasp
- Aquaman
- Avengers: Infinity War
- Black Mirror: Bandersnatch
- Black Panther
- Bumblebee
- The Cloverfield Paradox
- Deadpool 2
- The Death of Superman
- Deep Blue Sea 2
- The Endless
- The First Purge
- Godzilla: City on the Edge of Battle
- Incredibles 2
- Jurassic World: Fallen Kingdom
- Maze Runner: The Death Cure
- Mobile Suit Gundam Narrative
- Pacific Rim: Uprising
- The Predator
- Ralph Breaks the Internet
- Solo: A Star Wars Story
- Spider-Man: Into the Spider-Verse
- Tremors: A Cold Day in Hell
- The Last Sharknado: It's About Time
- Uchu Sentai Kyuranger vs. Space Squad

== Television ==
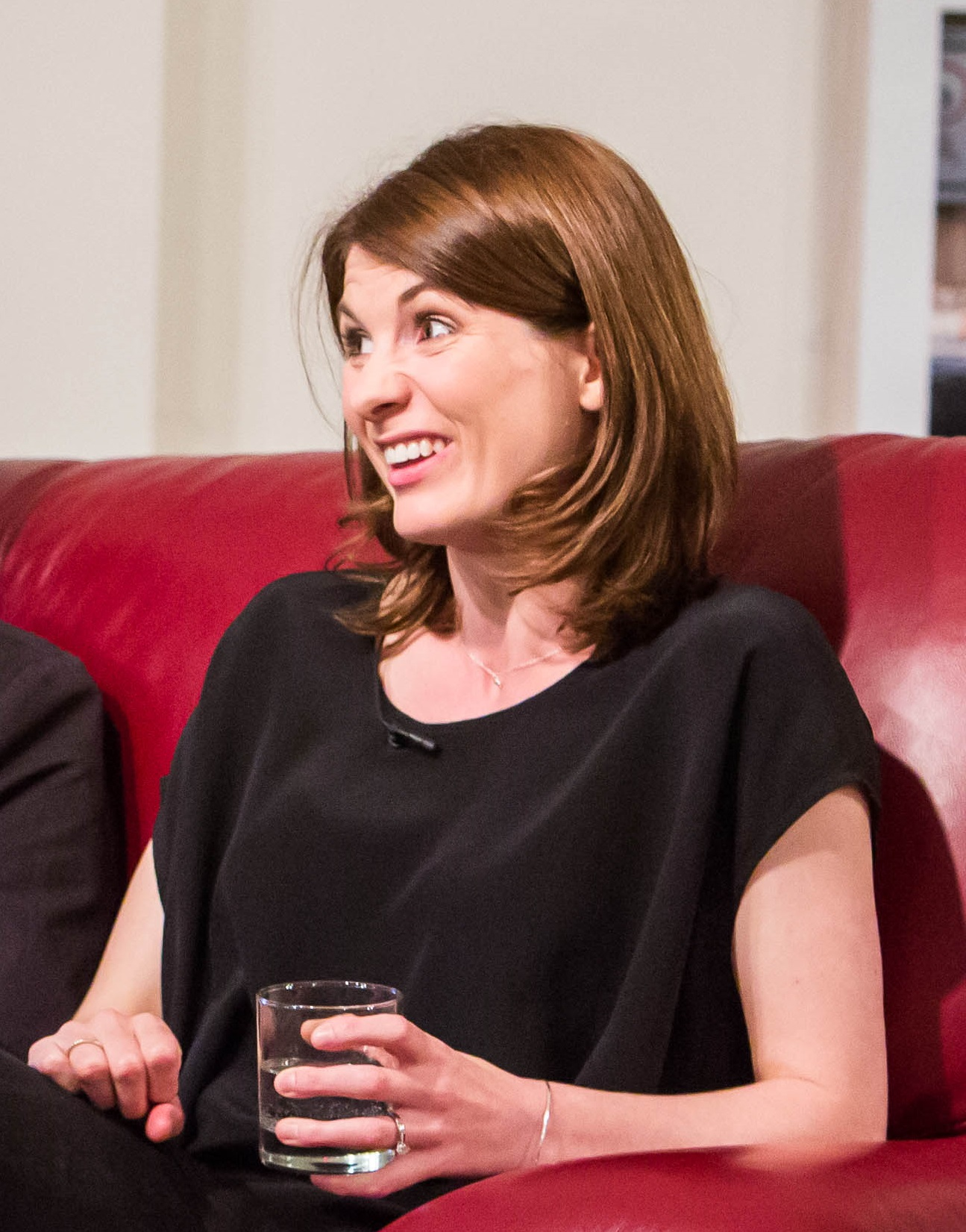
Jodie Whittaker plays the first ever female Doctor Who, the Thirteenth

=== New series ===
- 3Below: Tales of Arcadia
- Altered Carbon
- Are You Human?
- B: The Beginning
- Better than Humans
- Black Lightning, season 1
- The City and the City
- Cloak & Dagger
- Constantine: City of Demons
- Counterpart
- The Crossing
- Final Space
- The First
- The Gifted
- Hard Sun
- The Hollow
- Impulse
- The King of Blaze
- Krypton
- Life on Mars
- Lost in Space
- Nightflyers
- Origin
- The Rain (TV series)
- Reverie
- Rise of the Teenage Mutant Ninja Turtles
- She-Ra and the Princesses of Power
- Star Blazers: Space Battleship Yamato 2202
- Star Wars Resistance
- Stargate: Origins
- Steins;Gate 0
- Super Dinosaur
- Sweet Dreams
- Titans

=== Returning series ===
- 12 Monkeys, season 4
- Arrow, season 7
- Black Lightning, season 2
- Colony, season 3
- Daredevil, season 3
- Doctor Who, series 11
- The Expanse, season 3
- FLCL Progressive, FLCL Alternative
- The Flash, season 5
- The Gifted, season 2
- Gundam Build Divers
- The Handmaid's Tale, season 2
- Iron Fist, season 2
- Jessica Jones, season 2
- Kaitou Sentai Lupinranger VS Keisatsu Sentai Patranger
- Kamen Rider Zi-O
- Killjoys, season 4
- The Last Ship, season 5
- Legends of Tomorrow, season 4
- Legion, season 2
- Luke Cage, season 2
- ReBoot: The Guardian Code
- Salvation, season 2
- SciGirls, season 4
- Spy Kids: Mission Critical
- Stargate Origins
- Star Trek: Short Treks
- Star Wars Rebels, season 4
- Supergirl, season 4
- Sword Art Online: Alicization
- Timeless, season 2
- Transformers: Cyberverse
- Travelers, season 3
- Ultraman Orb: The Chronicle
- Ultraman R/B
- Voltron: Legendary Defender, seasons 5–8
- Westworld, season 2
- The X-files, season 11

== Video games ==
- Assassin's Creed Odyssey
- BattleTech
- Destiny 2: Forsaken
- Detroit: Become Human
- Fallout 76
- Fallout: New California
- Far Cry 5
- Frostpunk
- Iconoclasts
- Into the Breach
- Quake Champions
- Spider-Man
- Starlink: Battle for Atlas
- We Happy Few
- Xenoblade Chronicles 2: Torna – The Golden Country

== Awards ==
- The Handmaid's Tale received
  - an American Cinema Editors Award for Best Edited Drama Series for Non-Commercial Television,
  - an Art Directors Guild Award for One-Hour Contemporary Single-Camera Television Series,
  - an Artios Award from the Casting Society of America for Television Pilot First Season Drama,
  - a Costume Designers Guild Award for Excellence in Contemporary Television Series,
  - three Critics' Choice Television Awards,
  - a Directors Guild of America Award for Outstanding Directing – Drama Series,
  - two Golden Globe Awards,
  - a Peabody Award as Entertainment, children's and youth honoree,
  - the Producers Guild of America Award for Best Episodic Drama,
  - two Satellite Awards,
  - the USC Scripter Award for Best Adapted TV Screenplay,
  - two Writers Guild of America Awards, and
  - the British Academy Television Award for Best International Programme

=== Saturn Award ===
- Blade Runner 2049 for Best Science Fiction Film
- The Orville for Best Science Fiction Television Series

=== Academy Award ===
- Blade Runner 2049 for best visual effects and best cinematography.

=== Locus Award ===
- Best Novel: The Collapsing Empire by John Scalzi

=== Hugo Award ===
- Best Novel: The Stone Sky by N. K. Jemisin

=== Nebula Award ===
- Best Novel: The Stone Sky by N. K. Jemisin

== See also ==
Preceded by 2017	Science fiction by year 2018	Succeeded by 2019
