= Hammered =

Hammered may refer to:

- Hammered (Motörhead album), a 2002 album by Motörhead
- Hammered, a 2000 album by the Wicked Tinkers
- Hammered (Bear novel), a 2005 novel by Elizabeth Bear
- Hammered (Hearne novel), a 2011 novel by Kevin Hearne
- Hammered coinage
- Slang for getting drunk
- Hammer paint

== See also ==
- Hammer (disambiguation)
