= The Year's Best Science Fiction: Twenty-Seventh Annual Collection =

2010 anthology edited by Gardner Dozois

- Editor: Gardner Dozois
- Cover artist: Slawek Wojtowicz
- Language: English
- Series: The Year's Best Science Fiction
- Genre: Science fiction
- Publisher: St. Martin's Press
- Publication date: July 2010
- Publication place: United States
- Media type: Print (hardcover & trade paperback)
- Pages: 688 pp
- ISBN: 9780312608989
- Preceded by: The Year's Best Science Fiction: Twenty-Sixth Annual Collection
- Followed by: The Year's Best Science Fiction: Twenty-Eighth Annual Collection

The Year's Best Science Fiction: Twenty-Seventh Annual Collection is a science fiction anthology edited by Gardner Dozois that was published on July 6, 2010. It is the 27th in The Year's Best Science Fiction series. It was also published in the UK as The Mammoth Book of Best New SF 23.

== Contents ==
The book includes 32 stories, all first published in 2009. The book also includes a summation by Dozois, a brief introduction to each story by Dozois and a referenced list of honorable mentions for the year. The stories are as follows:

- Robert Charles Wilson: "Utriusque Cosmi"
- Steven Gould: "A Story, With Beans"
- Karl Bunker: "Under The Shouting Sky"
- John Kessel: "Events Preceding the Helvetican Revolution"
- Maureen F. McHugh: "Useless Things"
- Bruce Sterling: "Black Swan"
- Paul McAuley: "Crimes and Glory"
- Alexander Irvine: "Seventh Fall"
- Dominic Green: "Butterfly Bomb"
- Vandana Singh: "Infinites"
- John Barnes: "Things Undone"
- Jay Lake: "On The Human Plan"
- Peter Watts: "The Island"
- Lavie Tidhar: "The Integrity of the Chain"
- Mary Rosenblum: "Lion Walk"
- Jo Walton: "Escape to Other Worlds with Science Fiction"
- Rand B. Lee: "Three Leaves of Aloe"
- Elizabeth Bear & Sarah Monette: "Mongoose"
- Albert E. Cowdrey: "Paradiso Lost"
- Nicola Griffith: "It Takes Two"
- Geoff Ryman: "Blocked"
- James Van Pelt: "Solace"
- Nancy Kress: "Act One"
- John C. Wright: "Twilight of the Gods"
- Ted Kosmatka & Michael Poore: "Blood Dauber"
- Damien Broderick: "This Wind Blowing, And This Tide"
- Adam Roberts: "Hair"
- Robert Reed: "Before My Last Breath"
- Paul Cornell: "One of Our Bastards Is Missing"
- Chris Roberson: "Edison's Frankenstein"
- Ian Creasey: "Erosion"
- Ian McDonald: "Vishnu at the Cat Circus"

== Release Details ==
- 2010, United States, St. Martin's Press ISBN 978-0-312-60897-2, Pub date July 2010, Hardcover
- 2010, United States, St. Martin's Griffin ISBN 978-0-312-60898-9, Pub date July 2010, Trade paperback
