= The Year's Best Science Fiction: Twenty-Eighth Annual Collection =

2011 anthology edited by Gardner Dozois

- Editor: Gardner Dozois
- Illustrator: Slawek Wojtowicz
- Language: English
- Series: The Year's Best Science Fiction
- Genre: Science fiction
- Publisher: St. Martin's Press
- Publication date: July 5, 2011
- Publication place: United States
- Media type: Print (hardcover & trade paperback)
- Pages: 662 pp
- ISBN: 9780312546335
- Preceded by: The Year's Best Science Fiction: Twenty-Seventh Annual Collection
- Followed by: The Year's Best Science Fiction: Twenty-Ninth Annual Collection

UK edition cover

The Year's Best Science Fiction: Twenty-Eighth Annual Collection is a science fiction anthology edited by Gardner Dozois that was published on July 5, 2011. It is the 28th in The Year's Best Science Fiction series. It won the Locus Award for best anthology.

The anthology was also published in the UK as The Mammoth Book of Best New SF 24.

== Contents ==
The book includes 33 stories, all first published in 2010. The book also includes a summation by Dozois, a brief introduction to each story by Dozois and a referenced list of honorable mentions for the year. The stories are as follows:

- Robert Reed: "A History of Terraforming"
- Lavie Tidhar: "The Spontaneous Knotting of an Agitated String"
- Allen M. Steele: "The Emperor of Mars"
- Peter Watts: "The Things"
- Geoffrey A. Landis: "The Sultan of the Clouds"
- Kage Baker: "The Books"
- Ian R. MacLeod: "Re-Crossing the Styx"
- Tad Williams: "And Ministers of Grace"
- Eleanor Arnason: "Mammoths of the Great Plains"
- Joe Haldeman: "Sleeping Dogs"
- Steven Popkes: "Jackie's Boy"
- Nina Allan: "Flying in the Face of God"
- Cory Doctorow: "Chicken Little"
- Yoon Ha Lee: "Flower, Mercy, Needle, Chain"
- Stephen Baxter: "Return to Titan"
- Damien Broderick: "Under the Moons of Venus"
- Naomi Novik: "Seven Years from Home"
- Chris Beckett: "The Peacock Cloak"
- Carrie Vaughn: "Amaryllis"
- David Moles: "Seven Cities of Gold"
- Rachel Swirsky: "Again and Again and Again"
- Hannu Rajaniemi: "Elegy for a Young Elk"
- Michael Swanwick: "Libertarian Russia"
- Lavie Tidhar: "The Night Train"
- Brenda Cooper: "My Father's Singularity"
- Jay Lake and Ken Scholes: "The Starship Mechanic"
- Alastair Reynolds: "Sleepover"
- Pat Cadigan: "The Taste of Night"
- Alexander Jablokov: "Blind Cat Dance"
- Aliette de Bodard: "The Shipmaker"
- Ted Kosmatka: "In-Fall"
- Jim Hawkins: "Chimbwi"
- Robert Reed: "Dead Man's Run"

== Release details ==
- 2011, United States, St. Martin's Press ISBN 978-0-312-54633-5, Pub date July 5, 2011, Hardcover
- 2011, United States, St. Martin's Griffin ISBN 978-0-312-56950-1, Pub date July 5, 2011, Trade paperback
