= Kiss Me Twice =

2011 novella by Mary Robinette Kowal

"Kiss Me Twice" is a science fiction police procedural novella, by Mary Robinette Kowal. It was first published in Asimov's Science Fiction in June 2011. She began the story as a project for NaNoWriMo.

== Synopsis ==
When a police station is attacked and the computer storing the department's artificial intelligence is stolen, detective Scott Huang suspects a connection to a murder whose investigation the attack disrupted.

== Reception ==
"Kiss Me Twice" was a finalist for the 2012 Hugo Award for Best Novella, the Nebula Award for Best Novella of 2011, and the 2012 Locus Award for Best Novella.

Ken Liu praised Kowal's "dialogue that sparkles with wit". Jim C. Hines found the story reminiscent of the Elijah Baley stories, and lauded Huang as a "decent, determined, well-developed character who treats Metta [the AI] more like a partner than a machine".
