= The Games (Kosmatka novel) =

2012 novel by Ted Kosmatka

- Author: Ted Kosmatka
- Cover artist: David Stevenson
- Language: English
- Genre: Science fiction, Horror
- Publisher: Del Rey Books
- Publication date: 2012
- Publication place: United States
- Media type: Print (Hardback, 2012; Paperback, 2013)
- Pages: 406 pp
- ISBN: 978-0-345-52662-5

The Games is a 2012 science fiction novel by Ted Kosmatka, exploring the effects of advances in artificial intelligence and genetics on sport. It was a finalist for the 2013 Locus Award for Best First Novel.

== Plot ==
Geneticist Silas Williams oversees U.S. selections for the Olympic Gladiator competition, an internationally sanctioned bloodsport with only one rule: no entrants may possess human DNA. To maintain America’s edge, Silas’s superior engages an experimental supercomputer to design the ultimate combatant, producing a monster unlike anything ever seen.

== Reception ==
Publishers Weekly calls Kosmatka's debut a gripping and gory near-future thriller in which genetic engineering and jingoism prove to be a terrify-ing combination.

Booklist calls The Games very like something Michael Crichton might have written...An outstanding debut novel; expect big things from Kosmatka.

Strange Horizons considered The Games to be "the literary equivalent of a slightly above average, big-budget Hollywood blockbuster—slick, streamlined, and safely familiar", complimenting Kosmatka's prose, pacing, and "cinematic dynamism", while criticizing the worldbuilding and plot, and recommending that readers "switch off parts of (their) brain(s)" in order to maximize enjoyment.
