= The Lady Astronaut of Mars =

Novelette by Mary Robinette Kowal

"The Lady Astronaut of Mars" is an alternate history/science fiction short story by Mary Robinette Kowal. It was first published in 2012 as part of the Audible.com anthology Rip-Off.

== Synopsis ==
Thirty years after Elma York led the first expedition to Mars, she must choose between going on one last space mission or staying with her elderly husband as he dies.

== Reception ==
"The Lady Astronaut of Mars" was nominated for the 2013 Hugo Award for Best Novelette, but was disqualified on the grounds that, since it was originally presented in audio format, and Kowal had included stage directions for the benefit of readers, it should instead be in the category for Best Dramatic Presentation, Short Form — where it did not have enough nominations to remain on the final ballot. A text version was subsequently published on Kowal's own site and on Tor.com; it won the 2014 Hugo Award for Best Novelette.

The Los Angeles Review of Books considered it "shaky", attributing its Hugo success both to voter sympathy for Kowal's having been disqualified the previous year, and for its use of "the twin voter vices of nostalgia and sentimentality".

== Prequels ==
Kowal has released four novel-length prequels —The Calculating Stars and The Fated Sky in 2018, The Relentless Moon in 2020, and The Martian Contingency in 2025— depicting the disasters which led Elma's timeline to go to Mars in the 1960s and the struggles of establishing humanity there. She has also written a number of other short stories in this universe.
