= For Want of a Nail (short story) =

"For Want of a Nail" is a 2010 science fiction short story by Mary Robinette Kowal. It was first published in Asimov's Science Fiction.

== Synopsis ==
On a generation ship, attempts to repair an artificial intelligence lead to the revelation of a tragic secret.

== Reception ==
"For Want of a Nail" won the 2011 Hugo Award for Best Short Story", and was a finalist for the 2015 Seiun Award for Best Translated Story.

Tangent Online called it "a true tragedy, where all of the characters being true to themselves and the needs of their environment are forced into awful situations and must see them through" and "meticulously, scrupulously horrifying".

== Origins ==
In 2008, Kowal attended a fiction-writing workshop where she was tasked with writing a short story on site. Dean Wesley Smith, one of the workshop's hosts, found that story dull; however, Sheila Williams, who was the guest instructor, praised that story's opening scene. Several months later, Williams contacted Kowal to ask if she had done anything else with it, prompting Kowal to use it as the basis for an entirely new story.
