= Evil Robot Monkey =

- Short story by Mary Robinette Kowal
- Language: English
- Genre: Science fiction

Publication
- Published in: The Solaris Book of New Science Fiction: Volume 2
- Publication type: Book
- Publication date: 2008

"Evil Robot Monkey" is a science fiction short story by American writer Mary Robinette Kowal, published in 2008. It was nominated for the 2009 Hugo Award for Best Short Story.

== Plot summary ==
The story is about Sly, a chimp who loves to shape clay on a potter's wheel and has an implant which makes him much smarter than other chimps. This causes Sly to feel alienated, as he is "too smart to be with other chimps, but too much of an animal to be with humans". A group of schoolchildren show up and surprise Sly, as he was not warned of their arrival ahead of time. They mock him, causing him to throw clay at the viewing window and spell out S-S-A in the window, aware that they will read the word in reverse as intended. The children are taken away by their teacher, who complains to the scientists.

Vern, a sympathetic human handler, is commanded to take away Sly's bucket of clay. This angers Sly, particularly as Vern is unable to tell him when he will get it back. As Vern picks up the bucket of clay he tells Sly that the chimp must clean up the clay he hurled at the window. This angers Sly until he realizes that Vern is surreptitiously leaving him clay to continue sculpting with, as he is aware that it is one of the few pleasures he has left in life.

== Development ==
The original title was "Hairy Potter and the Evil Robot Monkey", but the editor requested that she change it, as the idea was to create a real story for the joke title.

== Release ==
"Evil Robot Monkey" was first published in The Solaris Book of New Science Fiction: Volume Two, which released in March 2008 through Solaris Books. It has subsequently been republished in multiple anthologies such as The Year's Best Science Fiction: Twenty-Sixth Annual Collection and The Hugo Award Showcase: 2010 Volume, the latter of which was edited by Kowal. Narrations of the short story have been released via the podcasts Escape Pod and The Drabblecast.

In 2019 Kowal published "Evil Robot Monkey" in Word Puppets, a collection of some of her short stories that was published via Prime Books.

== Reception ==
Reception for the short, particularly in relation to its Hugo Award nomination, has been mixed, with multiple reviewers noting elements of praise while opining that it was not as strong as other contenders. Several authors discussed the story on Vector, the journal of the British Science Fiction Association. Abigail Nussbaum praised Kowal's writing while also stating that this "doesn’t change the fact that “Evil Robot Monkey" doesn't do anything beyond establishing that plight, or that it does so in ways that are both trite and familiar." Ian Sales and Matt Hilliard were dismissive, while SF Signal co-founder felt that "The interesting premise is delicately overlaid with emotion by having a single human show the chimp some compassion, resulting in a quick-and-dirty sf short story that is both charming and memorable."

A journalist for Gizmodo Australia described the short story as one of "18 Perfect Short Stories That Pack More Of A Punch Than Most Novels", as it was "a pretty simple story, but it contains enough ideas and emotional heft to stick with you for a long time after reading."

=== Awards ===
"Evil Robot Monkey" was nominated for Best Short Story at both the Locus and Hugo Awards in 2009.
