= Carnival (Bear novel) =

2006 novel by Elizabeth Bear

- First edition cover
- Author: Elizabeth Bear
- Audio read by: Celeste Ciulla
- Language: English
- Genre: Science fiction
- Publisher: Bantam Spectra
- Publication date: November 28, 2006
- Publication place: United States
- Media type: Print (Paperback); Audiobook; ebook
- Pages: 393
- ISBN: 978-0-5535-8904-7
- LC Class: CPB Box no. 2689 vol. 7

Carnival is a 2006 science fiction novel by Elizabeth Bear, published in the US by Bantam Spectra. It was nominated for a Philip K. Dick Award, a Locus Award for Best Science Fiction Novel and a Lambda Literary Award.

== Setting ==
In the future, control of the preservation of interplanetary natural resources has been given over to ecological artificial intelligences called the Governors, who enforce carbon neutrality with strict population controls and energy consumption regulations, and even calculated genocide called "assessment". The parliament of the fascistic Old Earth Colonial Coalition, ruthless in its own support of the AIs, serves as a buffer to prevent unnecessary disruption to humanity. With colonists having left Earth generations before seeking freedom from these restrictions, the Coalition has now, for decades, been subsuming autonomous worlds back under its control. One of these is New Amazonia, a lush planet on which a matriarchal, primarily lesbian society has risen up amidst abandoned alien technology that includes a seemingly inexhaustible power supply. The Amazonian women are aggressive and warlike, but also pragmatic and defensive of their freedom from the male-dominated Coalition that seeks to conquer them. Distrustful of male aggression, they subjugate their men, a minority they seem to tolerate solely for reproduction and labor.

== Plot ==
A diplomatic mission to the matriarchal planet New Amazonia reunites ex-lovers Vincent Katherinessen and Michelangelo Kusanagi-Jones after a separation of 17 years. Arriving in the capital city of Penthesilea, the men are ostensibly repatriating looted artwork, but in truth the ambassador-spies have been tasked with obtaining the Amazonians' secret energy technology by any means necessary, and doing what they can to facilitate a Coalition conquest. However, both Vincent (a master of observation) and Angelo (a trained liar and fighter) each have hidden plans to undermine their own mission. Meanwhile, multiple factions among the Amazonians are engaged in covert political intrigues rooted in the gender dynamics of their society.

== Characters ==
- Vincent Katherinessen, OECC senior diplomat, originally from the planet Ur
- Michelangelo Kusanagi-Jones, Vincent's attaché and former partner, born on Old Earth
- Lesa Praetoria, deputy chief of Security Directorate of New Amazonia
- Claude Singapore, Prime Minister of New Amazonia
- Maiju Montevideo, Claude's wife
- Elena Pretoria, Lesa's mother
- Katya Pretoria, Lesa's daughter
- Julian Pretoria, Lesa's son
- Robert, the father of Lesa's children
- Kii, an alien intelligence residing in Penthesilea

== Themes ==
Annalee Newitz of io9 explained that, faced with strict population controls, the Earth-centric humans in Carnival have become obsessed with reproduction, and have outlawed homosexuality as directly opposing this function. She wrote that "Bear's idea that an eco-regime like this would breed conservatism rather than progressivism is really quite smart", and praised the author's "careful attention to how ideologies might evolve over time". Paul Kincaid of SF Site noted that Vincent and Michelangelo "are homosexuals from a world whose regressive and repressive mores mean that this could get them killed, but for the fact that they are exceptionally well-skilled at their job and also well-practiced in deception". Of the New Amazonian civilization, Newitz wrote:

[Carnival is] a novel where all the traditional ideas of liberal science fiction like matriarchies and ecotopias are turned on their heads. When lesbians rule a planet, they don't create peace and harmony: they become obsessed with guns and honor and dueling. They enslave all men (except homosexuals, whom they call "gentles"), using them to breed and for labor. And they engage in brutal guerilla warfare to gain power in government.

Explaining that the Amazonian women subjugate their men as a means to diffuse the potential of male aggression, Kincaid compared the matriarchal premise to "the feminist science fiction of twenty or perhaps thirty years ago". Joe Tokamak of The Internet Review of Science Fiction called the novel "a fantasy of societal alternatives reminiscent of the sixties or seventies" and yet "fresh, sophisticated material". He also noted how Bear's contrast of the societal differences between the New Amazonians and their visitors initiates conflict that evolves as the characters interact.

== Critical reception ==
In 2007, Carnival was nominated for a Philip K. Dick Award, a Locus Award for Best Science Fiction Novel and a Lambda Literary Award for LGBT Science Fiction/Fantasy/Horror.

Newitz wrote that the novel "manages to do what so few SF novels can ... it offers an intriguing, intellectually-rewarding glimpse at one human possible future while also telling a rip-roaring yarn." Liz Bourke of Tor.com called it "a vivid book, vital and alive", and cited it as her favorite of Bear's science fiction novels. Kincaid wrote, "Strip away the sexual politics overlaid on the story, which add complexity to the plot but not necessarily depth to the novel, and this is a book that could have come straight from the so-called golden age." Though suggesting that "there are too many layers of betrayal and deception for a book of this length", Kincaid wrote that "Bear keeps the whole thing moving at a brisk and satisfying pace ... this is exactly the sort of vivid, pacy novel that used to make science fiction such an exciting genre to read." Writing for SF Crowsnest, Tomas L. Martin called the characters "interesting and very dynamic", the galactic politics "top-notch" and some of the technology "breathtaking", while noting that the novel occasionally "gets a little bogged down and hard to navigate". Tokamak praised the "intriguing, three dimensional characters" and the "compelling and complex plot that gradually gets its hooks into the reader and doesn't let go", while calling the resolution "hasty and disconnected from all the misery the characters go through to get there".
