= Shoggoths in Bloom =

- Short story by Elizabeth Bear
- Country: United States
- Language: English
- Genre: Science fiction/Horror (Cthulhu Mythos)

Publication
- Published in: Asimov's Science Fiction
- Publication type: Magazine
- Media type: Print novelette
- Publication date: March 2008
- Pages: 14

"Shoggoths in Bloom" is a science fiction novelette by Elizabeth Bear, originally published in the March 2008 issue of the American magazine Asimov's Science Fiction, and subsequently republished in Bear's 2012 collection Shoggoths in Bloom.

== Plot summary ==
In 1938, Paul Harding is a black college professor who has come to a coastal Maine village to study the wild shoggoths. As news reports of Kristallnacht appear in the background, Harding discovers the unexpected truth about shoggoths, and is faced with a difficult decision.

== Reception ==
"Shoggoths" was the winner of the 2009 Hugo Award for Best Novelette. Tor.com called it a "stand-out".
