= Karen Memory =

2015 novel by Elizabeth Bear

- Cover
- Author: Elizabeth Bear
- Language: English
- Genre: Steampunk
- Publisher: Tor Books
- Publication date: February 3, 2015
- Publication place: United States
- Followed by: Stone Mad

Karen Memory is a steampunk novel by Elizabeth Bear. It was published by Tor Books, on February 3, 2015; a Japanese-language version was published on October 20, 2017.

In 2018, a sequel, "Stone Mad", was released; a second sequel, "Angel Maker", was released in 2025.

== Synopsis ==
In an alternate 1878, Karen Memery ("like memory only spelt with an e") is a teenage prostitute in the Pacific Northwest, whose life becomes complicated by the arrival of a serial killer, by a rival pimp's attempt to run for mayor, and by mad science.

== Reception ==
National Public Radio described the novel as "a bracing yet charming adventure yarn," praising Bear for giving Karen a "strong, sympathetic, charismatic voice" whose "narrative is sharp, sly, and full of heart." Locus considered it a "delight" and a "tour-de-force", comparing Karen to Huckleberry Finn, while Kirkus Reviews found the characters to be "lively" and "engaging", with an "intriguing" and "steampunk-ishly surreal" plot. Cheryl Morgan commended Bear for "straddl(ing) the fine line between sounding authentic and being irritating", and for depicting a multicultural and intersectional society, but found Bear's portrayal of a transgender character to be non-optimal, and conceded that readers "who identify more closely with other characters in the book's highly diverse cast" may find the portrayals of those characters to be similarly non-optimal.
