= Tideline (short story) =

Short story by Elizabeth Bear

- Short story by Elizabeth Bear
- Language: English
- Genre: Science fiction

Publication
- Published in: Asimov's Science Fiction
- Publication type: Magazine
- Publication date: June 2007

"Tideline" is a science fiction short story by American writer Elizabeth Bear, published in 2007. It won the 2008 Hugo Award for Best Short Story and the 2008 Theodore Sturgeon Award (tied with "Finisterra" by David R. Moles). "Tideline" appears in the twenty-fifth volume of Gardner Dozois's Year's Best Science Fiction anthology. In 2020 "Tideline" was read by LeVar Burton for the Stitcher Radio podcast LeVar Burton Reads.

== Plot summary ==
The story follows a sentient war machine, Chalcedony, which is the lone survivor of a highly apocalyptic war that has reduced the human population virtually to cavemen and hunter gatherers. As Chalcedony combs the beach looking for trinkets it can make into memorials for its fallen comrades, it develops a friendship with an orphaned boy.

When its power cells have completely worn down, the machine hands the trinkets to its now matured companion, telling him to spread the memory of those who fought.
