= The Spare Man =

2022 novel by Mary Robinette Kowal

- Author: Mary Robinette Kowal
- Language: English
- Genre: Science fiction; Mystery
- Publisher: Tor Books
- Pages: 368
- ISBN: 978-1-250-82917-7

The Spare Man is a 2022 science fiction murder mystery novel by Mary Robinette Kowal. The novel was a finalist for the 2023 Hugo Award for Best Novel and the 2023 Locus Award for Best Science Fiction Novel.

== Plot ==
Tesla Crane is a wealthy heiress and retired robotics engineer. She suffers from chronic pain and PTSD after a robotics accident that killed six crewmates; she walks with a cane and has a service dog named Gimlet. She and her spouse Shal travel on a cruise to Mars for their honeymoon.

Shal finds a woman named George Saikawa stabbed in the chest outside their cabin. Interested parties include Halden Kuznetsova, the ship’s owner; Dr. Fish, the ship’s physician and Kuznetsova’s estranged college roommate; and Niles Silver, a magician. Shal is arrested for Saikawa’s murder. Shal’s fingerprints are on the murder weapon, and an eyewitness identifies him as the killer. Shal, a retired private investigator, had previously spied on Kuznetsova and Saikawa as part of a case. Tesla knows he is innocent and vows to investigate.

A body is discovered in the ship’s mass recycler, but all passengers and crew are accounted for. Shal is hospitalized after a suspected overdose. Tesla finds that their gin has been spiked with opiates. Later, robots are stolen from both Tesla and Kuznetsova.

Dr. Fish falls from a balcony and leaves a suicide note confessing to killing Saikawa, but evidence indicates she was pushed and was dead before she hit the ground. Kuznetsova is stabbed by an unseen assailant, but survives. Niles Silver is killed during his own magic show.

The chief security officer brings all of the suspects together for an interrogation. Tesla’s stolen robot shoots at the group, aiming for Shal but killing a bartender instead. Tesla finds that Kuznetsova was piloting the robot from a nearby bathroom. He is actually an imposter; the real Kuznetsova is the dead body inside the recycler. The imposter is a distant cousin, Max Astaire, who planned to steal Kuznetsova’s identity and start a new life on Mars. He planned to kill all the people on the ship who could reveal the deception. He and Niles Silver were in league before Astaire killed Silver.

Astaire is arrested. Tesla and Shal celebrate their honeymoon on the remainder of the voyage.

== Reception and awards ==
In a starred review, Library Journal called it a "comedy-of-manners SF mystery" and recommended it to "anyone who loves a good mystery in an out-of-this-world setting." A by review by Adrienne Martini in Locus praised the light tone and called it "a perfect latter-stages-of-a-pandemic read". The review compared the novel to John Scalzi's The Kaiju Preservation Society, noting that both books were altered by the pressures of the COVID-19 pandemic. Martini also compared the characters of Tesla and Shal to Nick and Nora Charles from Dashiell Hammett's classic novel, The Thin Man. Publishers Weekly called the novel "vibrant" and particularly praised the nuanced handling of Tesla's disabilities.

The Spare Man was a finalist for the 2023 Hugo Award for Best Novel and the 2023 Locus Award for Best Science Fiction Novel.
