= Redstone Science Fiction =

- Issue #19, December 2011
- Editor: Michael E. Ray; Paul C. Clemmons
- Categories: Science fiction magazine
- Frequency: Monthly
- Publisher: Redstone Publishing
- First issue: June 1, 2010
- Final issue Number: September 1, 2012; 28
- Country: United States
- Language: English
- Website: redstonesciencefiction.com
- ISSN: 2157-9717

Redstone Science Fiction was an online science fiction magazine. The first issue was published June 1, 2010 and maintained a regular monthly schedule until the September 1, 2012 issue.

Redstone Science Fiction (often called Redstone SF) has published fiction by Cory Doctorow, Mary Robinette Kowal, Ken MacLeod, Cat Rambo, Hannu Rajaniemi, Vylar Kaftan, Lavie Tidhar, and others. The magazine has conducted interviews with many editors and authors in the science fiction field, including Lou Anders, John Joseph Adams, Mary Robinette Kowal, Vylar Kaftan, Cat Rambo, Lavie Tidhar, and others. Redstone SF has also published essays on science fiction literary criticism and the writing craft. The magazine initiated a writing contest in June 2010 to draw attention to issues of disability in science fiction.

== Staff ==
- Michael Ray, Co-Publisher, Editor
- Paul Clemmons, Publisher, Co-Editor
- Cassondra Link, Assistant Editor
- Ferlie, Assistant Editor
- Mary Ann Locke, Assistant Editor

== Critical reaction ==
Redstone Science Fiction was listed by Vision: A Resource for Writers as one of the top four places to submit science fiction short stories, along with Asimov's, Analog, and Lightspeed magazines.

In June 2011, Redstone Science Fiction was recognized as a professional market, a "Qualifying Short Fiction Venue", for membership in the Science Fiction and Fantasy Writers of America.
