= The Calculating Stars =

2018 science fiction novel by Mary Robinette Kowal

- First edition
- Author: Mary Robinette Kowal
- Language: English
- Series: Lady Astronaut Universe
- Genre: Science fiction
- Publisher: Tor Books
- Publication date: July 3, 2018
- Publication place: United States of America
- Pages: 432
- ISBN: 978-0-765378385
- Followed by: The Fated Sky

The Calculating Stars is a science fiction novel by American writer Mary Robinette Kowal. The book was published by Tor Books on July 3, 2018. It is the first book in the Lady Astronaut series and is a prequel to the 2012 short story "The Lady Astronaut of Mars".

== Plot ==
On March 3, 1952, a meteorite (apparently 1950 DA, but discovered two years later), strikes the East Coast of the United States. Most US government officials, including President Thomas Dewey, are killed in the disaster; Secretary of Agriculture Charles F. Brannan becomes president. Elma York, a mathematician and former WASP pilot, and her husband Nathaniel, a scientist who worked on the Manhattan Project and later NACA, survive the catastrophe. Many members of Elma’s family are killed by the meteor and resulting tsunamis.

Elma calculates that climate change from the disaster will make the Earth uninhabitable within decades. A miniature Ice Age will be followed by a sharp increase in temperature due to the greenhouse effect, ending in boiling oceans and the extinction of life on Earth. Elma and Nathaniel present the issue to President Brannan; the UN and USA agree to begin a space colony program. The UN forms the International Aerospace Coalition (IAC). Nathaniel becomes the IAC’s lead engineer. Elma applies to the space program, but no women are selected. She begins working as a computer.

Elma organizes an air show for female pilots and appears on a science television program to drum up public support for allowing women into the space program. Her image as the “Lady Astronaut” inspires many young women. She is opposed by astronaut Stetson Parker and Director Norman Clemons, who believe that women do not belong in space. After a rocket crash threatens to disrupt funding for the IAC, Elma testifies before Congress. In order to do this, she is forced to confront her own anxiety disorder and begin treatment. The IAC eventually begins to accept applications for women astronauts. Elma is allowed to apply, but almost all candidates of color are rejected.

In 1957, Elma is accepted as one of the first female astronauts. In order to pass the physical exam, she lies about taking Miltown for her anxiety. Parker and Elma form an uneasy truce; he threatens to reveal her use of Miltown if she does not help him hide a leg injury that would keep him grounded. Parker eventually has surgery, grounding him. Elma is assigned to replace him on the lunar mission. Parker attempts to have her grounded, but fails. The novel ends as Elma launches into space.

== Reception and awards ==
Publishers Weekly considered it "outstanding," with Elma's personal life "provid(ing) a captivating human center to the apocalyptic background." James Nicoll praised Kowal for being willing to include historically accurate racial and gender issues.

Year	Award	Category	Result	Ref.
2018	Nebula Award	Novel	Won	
2018	Sidewise Award	Long Form	Won	
2019	Campbell Memorial Award	—	Finalist	
2019	Dragon Award	Alternate History Novel	Nominated	
2019	Hugo Award	Novel	Won	
2019	Locus Award	Science Fiction Novel	Won	
2019	Otherwise Award	—	Honor List	
2021	Seiun Award	Translated Novel	Finalist	
