= Hammered (Bear novel) =

2004 science fiction novel by Elizabeth Bear

- Author: Elizabeth Bear
- Language: English
- Series: The Jenny Casey Trilogy
- Genre: Science fiction
- Publisher: Bantam Spectra
- Publication date: 28 December 2004
- Publication place: United States
- Media type: Print (paperback)
- Pages: 352 (paperback edition)
- ISBN: 0-553-58750-1
- OCLC: 57335348
- LC Class: CPB Box no. 2305 vol. 3
- Followed by: Scardown

Hammered is a science fiction novel by American writer Elizabeth Bear, first published on 28 December 2004 by Bantam Spectra. The book won the 2006 Locus Award for Best First Novel. It is the first book of a trilogy made of Hammered, Scardown, and Worldwired.

== Plot summary ==
Master Warrant Officer Jenny Casey is a Canadian ex-soldier who has cybernetic replacements for an arm and an eye that she lost during combat. Jenny's former commander, who was responsible for replacing her limbs, contacts her to bring her into a secret government corporate project in which she is uniquely qualified to participate.

== Reception ==
Publishers Weekly said in their review that "Bear's often jagged prose ('We disembark in Brazil, which has the distinction of being one of several countries I've been shot at in. Shot down over, even...') suits the frequent, at times confusing narrative jumps between the virtual and real worlds" and that "readers may have difficulties following this sometimes chaotic story." Noah Robischon in his review for Entertainment Weekly said that "Bear is talented, but this debut starts more good ideas than it finishes."

== Awards ==
- 2006 Locus Award for Best First Novel
