= The Relentless Moon =

2020 science fiction novel by Mary Robinette Kowal

- First edition
- Author: Mary Robinette Kowal
- Language: English
- Series: Lady Astronaut
- Genre: Science fiction
- Publisher: Tor Books
- Publication date: July 24, 2020
- Publication place: United States of America
- Pages: 544
- ISBN: 978-1-2502-3696-8
- Preceded by: The Fated Sky

The Relentless Moon is a science fiction novel by American writer Mary Robinette Kowal. The book was published by Tor Books on July 24, 2020. It is the 3rd book in the Lady Astronaut series.

== Reception ==
The Relentless Moon was nominated for the 2021 Hugo Award for Best Novel.

Publishers Weekly gave it a starred review and said the book, "...is hard science fiction at its most emotional, intimate, and insightful," also noting that "Kowal effortlessly blends espionage, spacefaring adventure, and social fiction, paying particular attention to the details of life as a female astronaut in the 1960s."
