= Elizabeth Bear =

American author (born 1971)

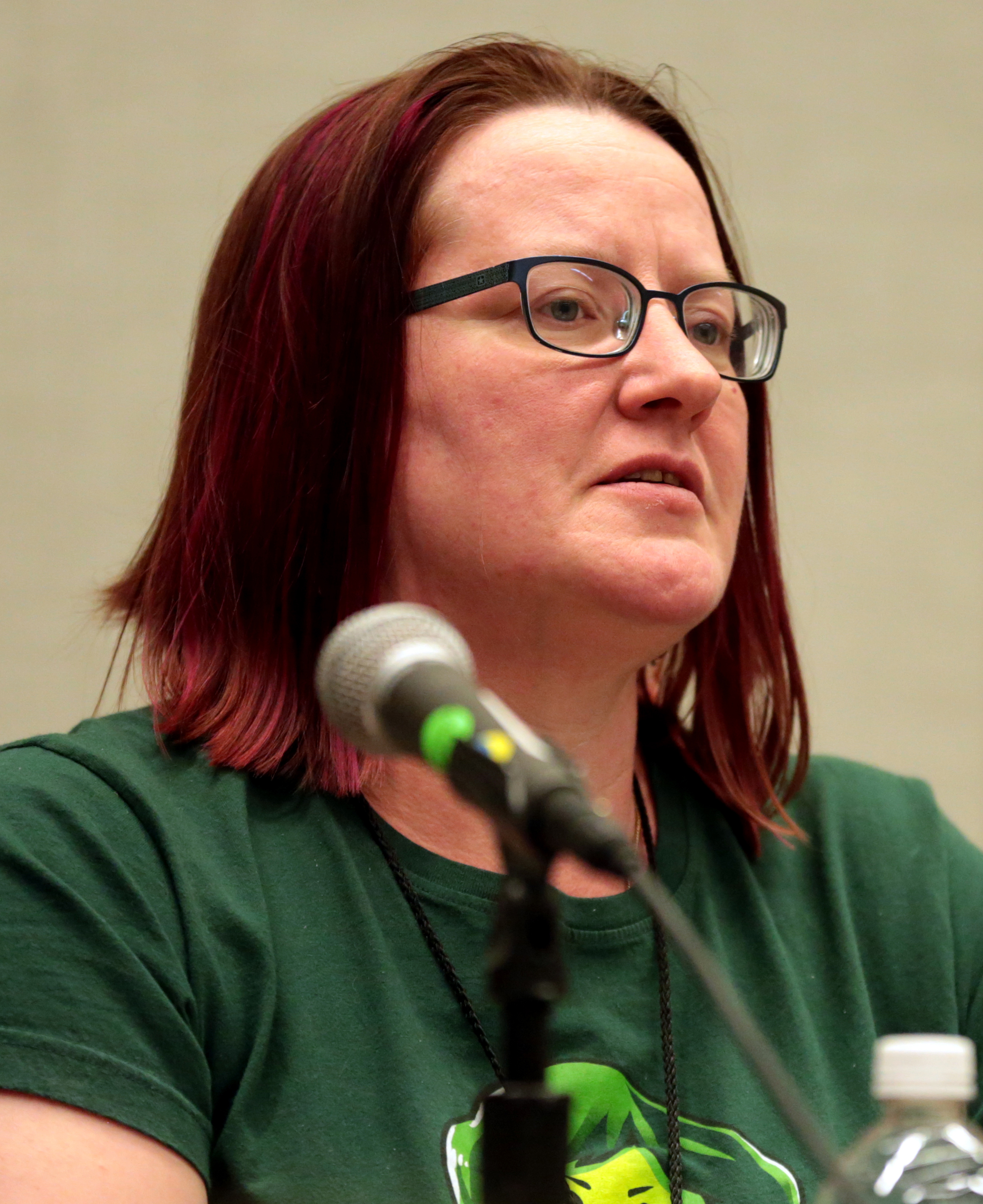
- Bear in 2017
- Born: Sarah Bear Elizabeth Wishnevsky; September 22, 1971 (age 55); Hartford, Connecticut, U.S.
- Education: University of Connecticut (non-degree)
- Occupation: Novelist
- Spouse(s): Christopher Kindred (2000-2007); Scott Lynch (2016–)
- Writing career
- Genre: Speculative fiction
- Website: Official website

Sarah Bear Elizabeth Wishnevsky (born September 22, 1971), better known as Elizabeth Bear, is an American author who works primarily in the speculative and science fiction genres. She is one of a small number of writers who have gone on, after winning Astounding Science Fiction's John W. Campbell Award for Best New Writer, to win multiple Hugo Awards for their fiction writing. She won the John W. Campbell Award in 2005, going on to receive, for instance, the 2008 Hugo Award for Best Short Story for "Tideline", and the 2009 Hugo Award for Best Novelette for "Shoggoths in Bloom".

== Early life and education ==
Bear was born Sarah Bear Elizabeth Wishnevsky, in Hartford, Connecticut on September 22, 1971.

She is regularly referred to as having "attended the University of Connecticut, where she studied English and anthropology, though she did not take a degree."

== Career ==
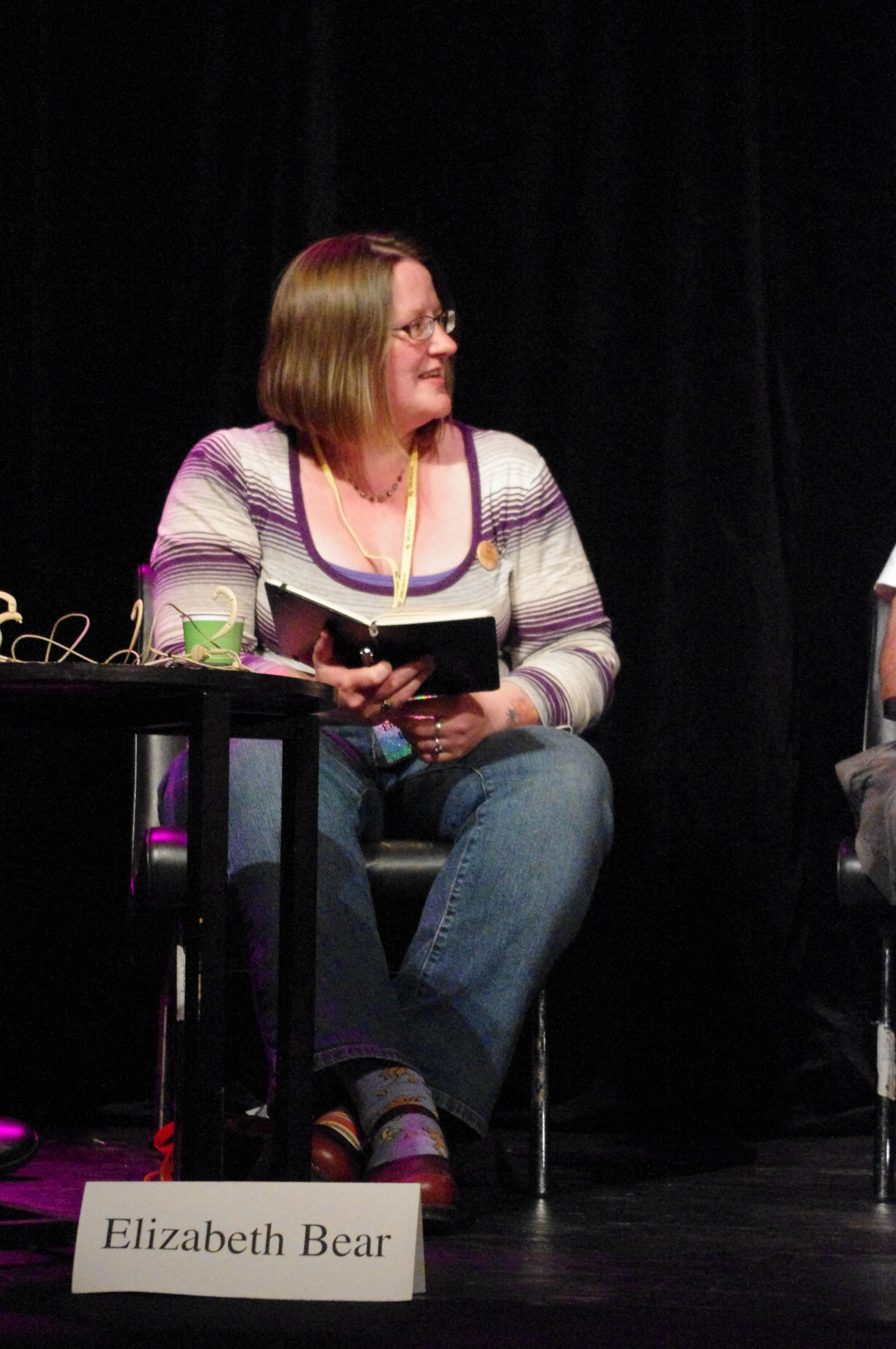
Bear at Eurocon/Swecon in 2011

As Locus magazine states in an introduction to an interview with her in 2006, Bear "has worked as a technical writer, a stable hand, a reporter, and in various office jobs", going on to say that "she sold a few stories to small-press publications in the [19]90s" and "only began writing seriously in 2001".

=== Fiction writing ===
Bear's first novel, Hammered, was published in January 2005. It was followed by Scardown in July, and Worldwired in November of the same year. The trilogy features Canadian Master Warrant Officer Jenny Casey, who is also the main character in the short story "Gone to Flowers". Hammered won the Locus Award for Best First Novel in 2006.

The Chains That You Refuse, a collection of her short fiction, was published May 2006 by Night Shade Books. Blood and Iron, the first book in the fantasy series entitled The Promethean Age, debuted June 27, 2006.

=== Teaching, and other media work and activities ===
Bear was an instructor at the Viable Paradise writer's workshop, and has taught at Clarion West Writers Workshop.

She was a writer at the ongoing Shadow Unit website/pseudo-TV series, and she has been a regular panelist on the podcast SF Squeecast.

In 2008, she donated her papers to the department of Rare Books and Special Collections at Northern Illinois University.

== Reception ==
Annalee Newitz of io9 wrote that Bear "is famous for combining high-octane military/spy tales with eccentric and subversive subplots".

== Awards and recognition ==
The "Award Bibliography" for Bear at the Internet Speculative Fiction Database lists over a 100 entries for her works that have nominated or received awards in her genre from 2004-2026, awards that include recognition on repeat occasions by Asimov's Reader, Cambell–Astounding Science Fiction, Lambda, Locus, BSFA, Gaylactic Spectrum, Gemmell and Hugo awards.

Bear is one of a small number of writers who have gone on to win multiple Hugo Awards for fiction after winning the John W. Campbell Award for Best New Writer, the list of others include C. J. Cherryh, Orson Scott Card, Spider Robinson, Ted Chiang, and Mary Robinette Kowal.

Bear and her fellow contributors' work at the podcast SF Squeecast were recognised in 2012 and 2013 by the Hugo Award for Best Fancast.

Awards for Elizabeth Bear
| Work | Year & Award | Category | Result | Ref. |
|---|---|---|---|---|
| Hammered | 2005 Astounding Award for Best New Writer | | Won | |
| Two Dreams on Trains | 2005 BSFA Award | Short Fiction | Nominated | |
| Sounding | 2006 BSFA Award | Short Fiction | Nominated | |
| Carnival | 2006 Philip K. Dick Award | | Won (Special Citation) | |
| Carnival | 2007 Locus Award | SF Novel | Nominated | |
| Carnival | 2007 Lambda Literary Award for Speculative Fiction | LGBT Horror/Science Fiction/Fantasy | Nominated | |
| Carnival | 2007 Gaylactic Spectrum Awards | Novel | Nominated | |
| Undertow | 2007 Philip K. Dick Award | | Finalist | |
| Undertow | 2008 Locus Award | SF Novel | Nominated | |
| Wax | 2006 Locus Award | Novelette | Nominated | |
| Wax | 2007 Interzone Readers Poll | Story | 8th Place | |
| Wane | 2007 Locus Award | Novelette | Nominated | |
| Cryptic Coloration | 2008 Locus Award | Novelette | Nominated | |
| New Amsterdam | 2008 Locus Award | Collection | Nominated | |
| New Amsterdam | 2008 Gaylactic Spectrum Awards | Novel | Nominated | |
| Orm the Beautiful | 2008 Locus Award | Short Story | Nominated | |
| Orm the Beautiful | 2008 WSFA Small Press Award | | Shortlisted | |
| Tideline | 2008 Locus Award | Short Story | Nominated | |
| Tideline | 2008 Asimov's Readers' Poll | Short Story | Won | |
| Tideline | 2008 Hugo Award | Short Story | Won | |
| Tideline | 2008 Theodore Sturgeon Award | Short Science Fiction | Won | |
| Whiskey and Water | 2008 Locus Award | Fantasy Novel | Nominated | |
| Whiskey and Water | 2008 Gaylactic Spectrum Awards | Novel | Nominated | |
| A Companion to Wolves (with Sarah Monette) | 2008 Lambda Literary Award for Speculative Fiction | LGBT Horror/Science Fiction/Fantasy | Nominated | |
| Dust | 2008 Gaylactic Spectrum Awards | Novel | Nominated | |
| The Stratford Man | 2009 Gaylactic Spectrum Awards | Novel | Won | |
| All the Windwracked Stars | 2009 Gaylactic Spectrum Awards | Novel | Nominated | |
| Shoggoths in Bloom | 2009 Hugo Award | Novelette | Won | |
| Shoggoths in Bloom | 2009 Locus Award | Novelette | Nominated | |
| Shoggoths in Bloom (Collection) | 2013 Locus Award | Collection | Won | |
| Boojum | 2009 Locus Award | Short Story | Nominated | |
| By the Mountain Bound | 2010 Gaylactic Spectrum Awards | Novel | Nominated | |
| Seven for a Secret | 2010 Gaylactic Spectrum Awards | Novel | Nominated | |
| Chill | 2010 Philip K. Dick Award | | Finalist | |
| Chill | 2011 Locus Award | SF Novel | Nominated | |
| Cuckoo (with Leah Bobet & Emma Bull) | 2010 Locus Award | Novella | Nominated | |
| Mongoose | 2010 Locus Award | Novelette | Nominated | |
| Bone and Jewel Creatures | 2011 World Fantasy Award | Novella | Nominated | |
| Bone and Jewel Creatures | 2011 Locus Award | Novella | Nominated | |
| Range of Ghosts | 2012 Otherwise Award | | Honor | |
| Range of Ghosts | 2013 Locus Award | Fantasy Novel | Nominated | |
| METAtropolis: Cascadia | 2012 Audie Award | Original Work | Won | |
| SF Squeecast | 2012 Hugo Award | Fancast | Won | |
| SF Squeecast | 2013 Hugo Award | Fancast | Won | |
| Dolly | 2012 Locus Award | Short Story | Nominated | |
| Grail | 2012 Locus Award | SF Novel | Nominated | |
| Grail | 2012 Gaylactic Spectrum Awards | Novel | Nominated | |
| Faster Gun | 2013 Locus Award | Novelette | Nominated | |
| In the House of Aryaman, a Lonely Signal Burns | 2013 Locus Award | Novella | Nominated | |
| In the House of Aryaman, a Lonely Signal Burns | 2013 Asimov's Readers' Poll | Novella | 4th Place | |
| No Decent Patrimony | 2013 Locus Award | Novelette | Nominated | |
| The Deeps of the Sky | 2013 Locus Award | Short Story | Nominated | |
| The Wreck of the Charles Dexter Ward | 2013 Locus Award | Novelette | Nominated | |
| Covenant | 2015 Locus Award | Short Story | Nominated | |
| Steles of the Sky | 2015 Locus Award | Fantasy Novel | Nominated | |
| The Hand is Quicker | 2015 Locus Award | Novelette | Nominated | |
| This Chance Planet | 2015 Locus Award | Short Story | Nominated | |
| Karen Memory | 2016 Locus Award | Fantasy Novel | Nominated | |
| Karen Memory | 2016 Gaylactic Spectrum Awards | Novel | Nominated | |
| The Heart's Filthy Lesson | 2016 Locus Award | Novelette | Nominated | |
| The Stone in the Skull | 2018 Locus Award | Fantasy Novel | Nominated | |
| Okay, Glory | 2019 Locus Award | Novelette | Nominated | |
| The Red-Stained Wings | 2020 Locus Award | Fantasy Novel | Nominated | |
| A Time to Reap | 2020 Locus Award | Novella | Nominated | |
| Ancestral Night | 2020 Locus Award | SF Novel | Nominated | |
| Erase, Erase, Erase | 2020 Locus Award | Novelette | Nominated | |
| Lest We Forget | 2020 Locus Award | Short Story | Nominated | |
| Machine | 2021 Locus Award | SF Novel | Nominated | |
| Machine | 2021 Dragon Awards | Science Fiction | Nominated | |
| Machine | 2021 Neffy Awards | Novel | Won | |
| The Best of Elizabeth Bear | 2021 Locus Award | Collection | Nominated | |
| A Blessing of Unicorns | 2022 Asimov's Readers' Poll | Novella | Won | |
| A Blessing of Unicorns | 2022 Locus Award | Novella | Nominated | |
| The Red Mother | 2022 Locus Award | Novelette | Nominated | |
| White Space | 2026 Hugo Award | Series | Finalist | |

== Personal life ==
As of May 2020, Bear had been married twice; she was married to Christopher Kindred from 2000-2007, and after entering into a relationship with Scott Lynch in 2011—a "fantasy writer and firefighter" whose work includes novels—the two married in October 2016. As of that date, Bear was living with Lynch in Western Massachusetts, although it has also been stated that she keeps a home in Connecticut.

In 2021, Bear announced that she had been diagnosed with early-stage breast cancer.

== Bibliography ==
=== Novels ===
- Carnival (November 2006, Bantam Spectra)
- Undertow (August 2007, Bantam Spectra)
- Bone and Jewel Creatures (novella) (2010, Subterranean Press)
- The Cobbler's Boy (2018)

The Jenny Casey trilogy

- Hammered (January 2005, Bantam Spectra)
- Scardown (July 2005, Bantam Spectra)
- Worldwired (November 2005, Bantam Spectra)

The Promethean Age

- Blood and Iron (June 2006, ROC)
- Whiskey and Water (July 2007, ROC)
- The Stratford Man:
  - Volume I: Ink and Steel (July 2008, ROC)
  - Volume II: Hell and Earth (August 2008, ROC)
- One Eyed Jack (November 2013, Prime Books)

Jacob's Ladder trilogy

- Dust (December 2007, Spectra)
- Chill (February 2010, Spectra)
- Grail (February 2011, Spectra)

The Edda of Burdens

- All the Windwracked Stars (November 2008, Tor Books)
- By the Mountain Bound (November 2009, Tor Books)
- The Sea thy Mistress (February 2011, Tor)

The Iskryne series

- A Companion to Wolves, with Sarah Monette (October 2007, Tor Books)
- The Tempering of Men, with Sarah Monette (August 2011, Tor Books)
- An Apprentice to Elves, with Sarah Monette (June 25, 2015, Tor Books)

New Amsterdam series

- New Amsterdam (May 2007, Subterranean Press)
- Seven for a Secret (novella; March 2009, Subterranean Press)
- The White City (novella; 2011, Subterranean Press)
- Ad Eternum (novella; February 2012, Subterranean Press)
- Garrett Investigates (November 2012, Subterranean Press)

Eternal Sky Trilogy

- Range of Ghosts (March 2012, Tor Books)
- Shattered Pillars (2013, Tor Books)
- Steles of the Sky (2014, Tor Books)

The Lotus Kingdoms

- The Stone in the Skull (2017, Tor Books)
- The Red-Stained Wings (2019, Tor Books)
- The Origin of Storms (2022, Tor Books)

Karen Memory

- Karen Memory (2015, Tor-Forge)
- Stone Mad (2018, Tor-Forge)
- Angel Maker (2025, Sobbing Squonk Press)

White Space

- Ancestral Night (2018, Gallery / Saga Press)
- Machine (2020, Gallery / Saga Press)
- The Folded Sky (2025, Saga Press)

=== Short fiction ===
Collections

- The Chains That You Refuse (May 2006, Night Shade Books)
- Jewels and Stones (2010)
- Shoggoths in Bloom (October 2012, Prime Books)
- The Best of Elizabeth Bear (2020)

Short stories

- Love-In-Idleness (1998) (In anthology Midsummer Night's Dreams: One Story, Many Tales edited by M. Christian)
- The Company of Four (2000) (E.B.'s The Chains that You Refuse; also appeared in Scheherazade issue #20 in 2000.)
- Speak! (2003) (In On Spec magazine, Winter 2003)
- Tiger! Tiger! (2003) (In anthology Shadows Over Baker Street (2003), edited by John Pelan & Michael Reaves.)
- Ice (2003) (Ideomancer, Apr. 2003 & (Lod: Polish-language version) in Nowa Fantastyka #7, Summer 2004.)
- The Chains That You Refuse (2004) (ChiZine magazine, Apr.-June 2004)
- This Tragic Glass (2004) (Sci Fiction webzine, Apr. 2004)
- Old Leatherwings (2004)
- Seven Dragons Mountains (2004) (Appeared in anthology All-Star Zeppelin Adventure Stories, edited by Jay Lake & David Moles.)
- Sleeping Dogs Lie (2004) (Flytrap magazine, Nov. 2004)
- When You Visit the Magoebaskloof Hotel, Be Certain Not to Miss the Samango Monkeys (2004) (Interzone 195, Nov/Dec 2004)
- Los Empujadores Furiosos (2005) (On Spec magazine, Winter 2006)
- The House of the Rising Sun (2005) (Anthology By Blood We Live, edited by John Joseph Adams & in The Third Alternative #42, Summer 2005)
- Wax (2005) (Interzone #201, Nov/Dec 2005 & reprinted in Fantasy: The Best of the Year 2006 edition, June 2006)
- Two Dreams on Trains (2005) (Strange Horizons webzine, Jan. 2005; reprinted in Year's Best Science Fiction: 23rd Annual Collection (July 2006) & reprinted in Rewired: The Post-Cyberpunk Anthology. Spanish-language version, Dos Sueños con Trenes, appeared in Cuasar #42, Marzo 2006)
- Follow Me Light (2005) (Sci Fiction webzine, Jan. 2005, reprinted in Best New Paranormal Romance (Nov. 2006) & Year's Best Fantasy and Horror (Sept. 2006)
- Botticelli (2005) (The Agony Column, Feb. 2005)
- And the Deep Blue Sea (2005) (Sci Fiction webzine, May 2005 & anthology Wastelands: Stories of the Apocalypse edited by John Joseph Adams)
- Long Cold Day (2005) (Sci Fiction webzine, Sept. 2005)
- The Inevitable Heat Death of the Universe (2006) (Subterranean Magazine #4, 2006)
- One-Eyed Jack and the Suicide King (2005)
- Gone to Flowers (2006) (Appeared in anthology Eidolon I, edited by Jonathan Strahan & Jeremy G. Byrne)
- High Iron (2006)
- Wane (2006) (Interzone #203 Mar/Apr 2006)
- Love Among the Talus (2006) (Strange Horizons, Dec. 2006)
- L'Esprit d'Escalier: Not a Play in One Act (2006)
- Lucifugous (2006) (Subterranean Magazine #5 (2006)
- Schrödinger's Cat Chases the Super String (2006)
- The Ile of Dogges (with Sarah Monette) (2006) (Aeon 7, 2006)
- The Cold Blacksmith (2006) (Jim Baen's Universe, June 2006)
- Sounding (2006) (Strange Horizons, Sept. 2006)
- The Devil You Don't (2006) (Amberzine 11)
- Stella Nova (2006)
- Limerent (2007) (Subterranean Magazine #6, 2007)
- Orm the Beautiful (Clarkesworld Magazine, Jan. 2007)
- The Something-Dreaming Game (2007) (Fast Forward 1)
- War Stories (2007) (Jim Baen's Universe, Feb. 2007)
- Cryptic Coloration (2007) (Jim Baen's Universe ebook magazine, June 2007)
- Tideline (2007) (Asimov's Science Fiction, June 2007)
- Black Is the Color (2007) (Subterranean Magazine, Summer 2007)
- The Rest of Your Life in a Day (2007) (Jim Baen's Universe, Oct. 2007)
- Inelastic Collisions (2007) (Appeared in anthology Inferno: New Tales of Terror and the Supernatural edited by Ellen Datlow)
- The Ladies (2007) (Coyote Wild, Dec. 2007)
- Abjure the Realm (2007) (Coyote Wild, Winter 2007 & the anthology The Mammoth Book of Warriors and Wizardry edited by Sean Wallace)
- Annie Webber (2008) (Nature magazine, Jan. 2008)
- Boojum (with Sarah Monette) (2008) (Anthology Fast Ships, Black Sails, edited by Ann & Jeff VanderMeer)
- Hobnoblin Blues (2008) (Realms of Fantasy magazine, Feb. 2008)
- Shoggoths in Bloom (2008) (Asimov's Science Fiction, Mar. 2008)
- Your Collar (2008) (Subterranean Magazine, 2008)
- Sonny Liston Takes the Fall (2008) (Anthology The Del Rey Book of Science Fiction and Fantasy edited by Ellen Datlow)
- The Red in the Sky Is Our Blood (2008) (Anthology METAtropolis edited by John Scalzi)
- The Girl Who Sang Rose Madder (2008)
- Snow Dragons (2009) (Subterranean Magazine, Summer 2009)
- Mongoose (with Sarah Monette) (2009) (Lovecraft Unbound (2009, Dark Horse Comics. Reprinted in The Year's Best Science Fiction: Twenty-Seventh Annual Collection)
- Formidable Terrain (2009) (H. P. Lovecraft's Magazine of Horror, Spring 2009)
- Cuckoo (2009) (with Leah Bobet & Emma Bull)
- Swell (2009) (Anthology Eclipse Three edited by Jonathan Strahan)
- The Horrid Glory of Its Wings (2009) (At Tor.com/Dec. 2009)
- Dolly (2011)
- The Romance (2011) (Anthology Supernatural Noir edited by Ellen Datlow)
- Gods of the Forge (2011)
- The Leavings of the Wolf (2011)
- King Pole, Gallows Pole, Bottle Tree (2011) (Anthology Naked City: New Tales of Urban Fantasy edited by Ellen Datlow)
- Needles (2011)
- The Salt Sea and the Sky (2012) (Anthology Brave New Love: 15 Dystopian Tales of Desire edited by Paula Guran)
- ad eternum (2012)
- The Slaughtered Lamb (2012)
- Faster Gun (2012)
- Form and Void (2012) (Webzine Fireside, Winter 2012)
- The Wreck of the "Charles Dexter Ward (with Sarah Monette) (2012) (Anthology New Cthulhu 2: More Recent Weird edited by Paula Guran)
- The Death of Terrestrial Radio (2012)
- The Deeps of the Sky (2012)
- No Decent Patrimony (2012) (Asimov's Science Fiction, Feb. 2015)
- The Governess (2013)
- Book of Iron (2013)
- The Hand is Quicker (2014)
- No Place to Dream, but a Place to Die (2014)
- You've Never Seen Everything (2014) (Appeared in anthology The End Is Now edited by John Joseph Adams & Hugh Howey)
- Madam Damnable's Sewing Circle (2014) (Appeared in anthology Dead Man's Hand: An Anthology of the Weird West, edited by John Joseph Adams)
- Covenant (2014)
- In the House of Aryaman, a Lonely Signal Burns (2012) (Appeared in Asimov's Science Fiction, Jan. 2012 & reprinted in The Year's Best Science Fiction: Thirtieth Annual Collection, edited by Gardner Dozois)
- This Chance Planet (2014)
- Terrior (2014)
- The Bone War(2015)
- The Heart's Filthy Lesson (2015) (Appeared in anthology Old Venus edited by Gardner Dozois & George R. R. Martin)
- In Libres (2015)
- Margin of Survival (2015) (Appeared in anthology The End Is Now edited by John Joseph Adams & Hugh Howey)
- And the Balance in Blood (2015)
- Skin in the Game (2015)
- What Someone Else Does Not Want Printed (2017) (Appears in anthology Resist: Tales from a Future Worth Fighting Against, edited by Hugh Howey)
- Perfect Gun (2017)
- The King's Evil (2017) (Appears in anthology The Book of Swords edited by Gardner Dozois)
- No Work of Mine (2018) (Appeared in the anthology The Book of Magic edited by Gardner Dozois)
- She Still Loves the Dragon (2018)
- Okay, Glory (2018)
- We Have Always Died in the Castle (2018)
- Bug's A-Life (2018)
- Particulates (2018) (Appears in anthology Particulates edited by Nalo Hopkinson)
- Deriving Life (2019)
- Lest We Forget (2019)
- No Moon and Flat Calm (2019)
- Bullet Point (2019) (Appears in the anthology Wastelands: The New Apocalypse edited by John Joseph Adams)
- Soft Edges (2019) (Appeared in webzine anthology Current Futures: A Sci-fi Ocean Anthology edited by Ann VanderMeer)
- Erase, Erase, Erase (2019)
- A Time to Reap (2019)
- Hacksilver (2020)
- On Safari in R'lyeh and Carcosa with Gun and Camera (2020)
- A Blessing of Unicorns (2020) (Appeared in Asimov's Science Fiction, Sept.-Oct. 2021)
- The Red Mother (2021)
- The Part You Throw Away (2022)
- Twin Strangers (2022) (Appeared in anthology Tasting Light: Ten Science Fiction Stories to Rewire Your Perceptions edited by A. R. Capetta & Wade Roush)
- Here Instead of There (2023) (Appeared in anthology Communications Breakdown: SF Stories About the Future of Connection edited by Jonathan Strahan. Read aloud on podcast Escape Pod, part I Oct. 2, 2025 and part II on Oct. 9, 2025.)

=== Poetry ===
- "Li Bai Drowns While Embracing the Moon" in Not One of Us, Issue 42.
- "Seven Steeds" in Lone Star Stories, Issue 29, Oct. 2008.
- "e.e. 'doc' cummings" in The Magazine of Fantasy & Science Fiction, March 2003.
- Hel on a Headland in Uncanny Magazine (Jan-Feb 2023)

=== Essays ===
- "We'll Make Great Pets" in Chicks Dig Time Lords (2010, Mad Norwegian Press)
