= Ted Kosmatka =

American writer

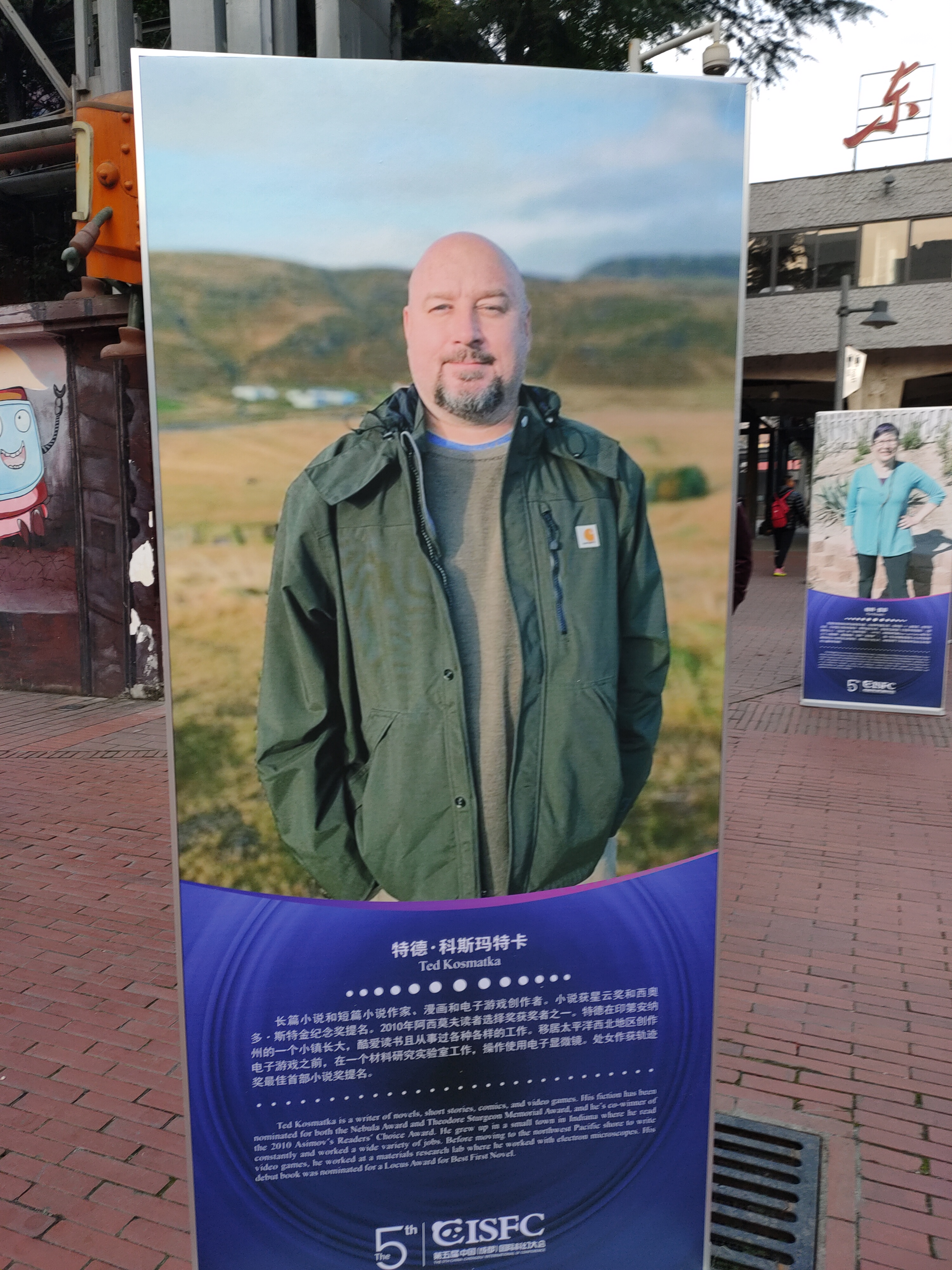
- Ted Kosmatka's poster at the 5th CISFC
- Born: 16 December 1973 (age 52); Chesterton
- Occupations: novelist, screenwriter, science fiction writer
- Writing career
- Genres: Science fiction literary fiction
- Website: www.tedkosmatka.us

Ted Kosmatka is an American writer. His short stories have been reprinted in ten Year's Best anthologies, and he is a two-time winner of the Asimov's Readers' Poll Award. His novelette "Divining Light" was nominated for the 2009 Nebula Award for Best Novelette, and his novel The Games was nominated for the 2013 Locus Award for Best First Novel.

== Personal life ==
Kosmatka was born and raised in northwest Indiana where he worked for more than a decade in the steel industry. After moving to Seattle with his family, he worked for several years as a video game writer before returning to the Midwest.

== Awards and Honors ==
Kosmatka has been nominated for the Nebula Award and Locus Award, and he was a finalist for the Sturgeon Award. He is a five-time nominee and two-time winner of the Asimov's Readers' Award Poll.

List of awards and honors in chronological order:

- Best Novelette (3rd Place), 2008 Asimov's Readers' Award Poll for "The Prophet of Flores".
- Best Novelette (Nomination), 2009 Nebula Awards for "Divining Light".
- Best Novelette (2nd Place), 2009 Asimov's Readers' Award Poll for "Divining Light".
- 2010 Finalist, Theodore Sturgeon Memorial Award for "Blood Dauber".
- Best Novelette (Winner), 2010 Asimov's Readers' Award Poll for "Blood Dauber".
- Best First Novel (Nomination), 2013 Locus Awards for "The Games".
- Best Short Story (Winner), 2020 Asimov's Readers' Award Poll for "Sacrificial Iron".
- Best Novelette (3rd Place (tie)), 2021 Asimov's Readers' Award Poll for "The Beast Adjoins".

== Bibliography ==
=== Novels ===
- The Games (2012)
- Prophet of Bones (2013)
- The Flicker Men (2015)

=== Video games ===
- Dota 2 (2013)
- Portal 2 (2011)

=== Short Speculative Fiction ===
- "The Signal and the Idler," Asimov's Science Fiction, Vol. 49 No. 596 & 597 (Sep/Oct 2025).
- "Shy Sarah and the Draft Pick Lottery," Asimov's Science Fiction, Vol. 54 No. 540 (Jan/Feb 2021).
- "The Beast Adjoins," Asimov's Science Fiction, Vol. 44 No. 532 (Jul/Aug 2020).
- "Sacrificial Iron," Asimov's Science Fiction, Vol. 43 No. 520 (May/Jun 2019).
- "The One Who Isn't," Lightspeed Magazine, Issue 74 (Jul 2016).
- "The Stone War," The Magazine of Fantasy & Science Fiction (May/Jun 2016).
- "The Bewilderness of Lions," Asimov's Science Fiction, Vol. 40 No. 482 (Mar 2016).
- "Chasing Ivory," Asimov's Science Fiction, Vol. 40 No. 480 (Jan 2016).
- "Cry Room," Nightmare Magazine, Issue 5 (Feb 2013).
- "Haplotype 1402," Asimov's Science Fiction, Vol. 37 No. 450 (Jul 2013).
- "Escape He Done," Shocklines: Fresh Voices in Terror, 2013.
- "The Color Least Used by Nature," The Magazine of Fantasy & Science Fiction (Jan/Feb 2012).
- "In-fall," Lightspeed Magazine, Issue 7 (Dec 2010).
- "Blood Dauber," (in collaboration with Michael Poore) Asimov's Science Fiction, Vol. 33 No. 405 & 406 (Oct/Nov 2009).
- "Limited Penetrance, Variable Expression," The Human Genre Project, July 2009.
- "The Ascendant," Subterranean Online, Spring 2009.
- "Divining Light," Asimov's Science Fiction, Vol. 32 No. 391 (Aug 2008).
- "The Art of Alchemy," The Magazine of Fantasy & Science Fiction (Jun 2008).
- "N-words," Seeds of Change, edited by John Joseph Adams, 2008.
- "The Prophet of Flores," Asimov's Science Fiction, Vol. 31 No. 380 (Sep 2007).
- "Deadnauts," Ideomancer, Vol. 6 Iss. 3 (Sep 2007).
- "Doxology," City Slab, #11 (Feb 2007).
- "Bitterseed," Asimov's Science Fiction, Vol. 30 No. 366 (Jul 2006).
- "The God Engine," Asimov's Science Fiction, Vol. 29 No. 357 & 358 (Oct/Nov 2005).
- "Quicksilver," SPIRITS Magazine (Indiana University Northwest).
- "The Extinction of Ursus Theodorus," Deep Outside SFFH (Mar 2000).

=== Short Literary Fiction ===
- "Last Exit of Highway 94," Kindred Voices, 2006.
- "Indiana Harbor Jones," Workers' Anthology Audio CD, 2006.
- "Steel," Spirits Magazine.

=== Essays ===
- "Philip K. Dick the Shaman," Do Androids Dream of Electric Sheep #18, Boom Studios, 2010.

=== Plays ===
- Steel, a one act play
