= Mary Robinette Kowal =

American author and puppeteer (born 1969)

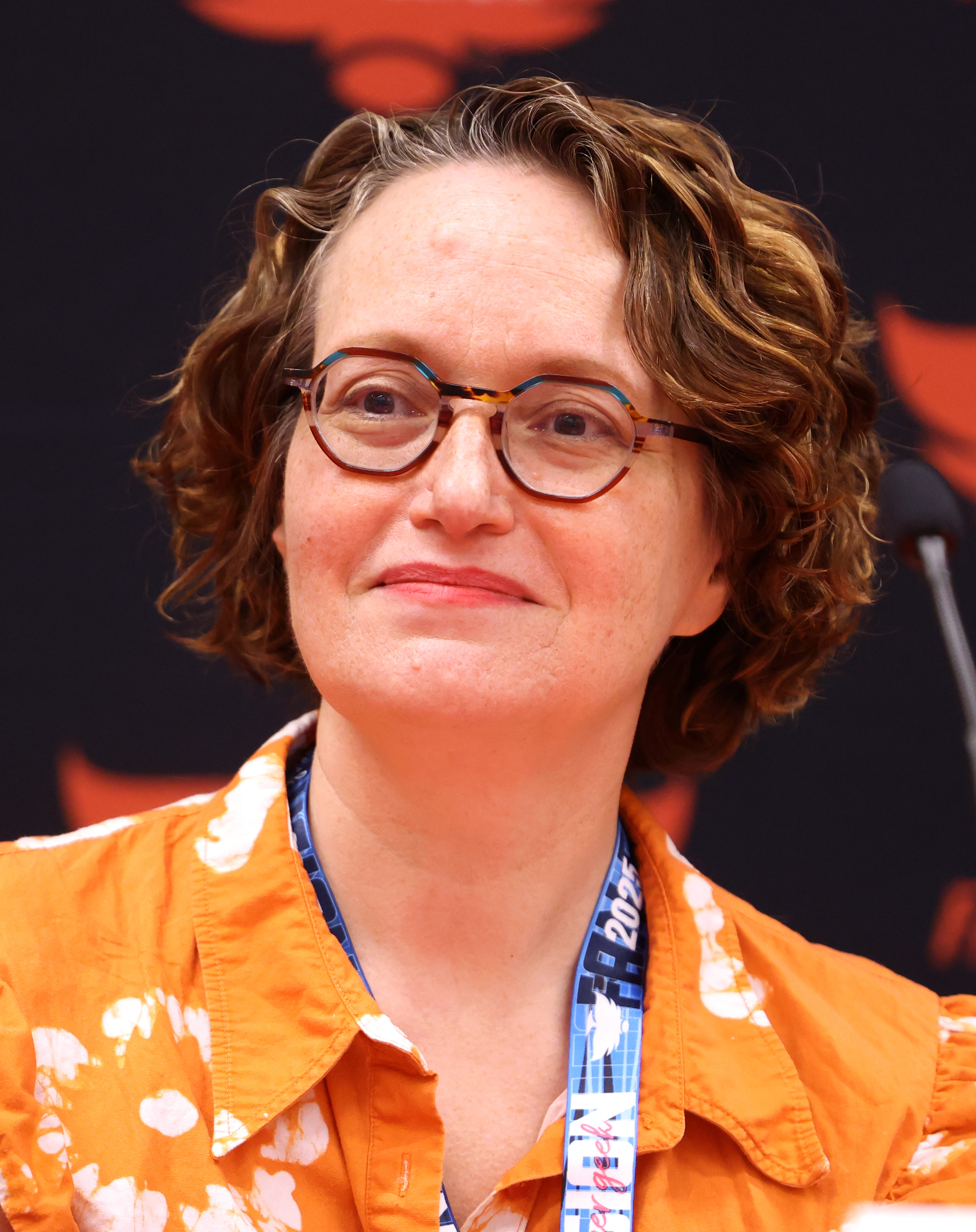
- Kowal in 2025
- Born: Mary Robinette Harrison; February 8, 1969 (age 57); Raleigh, North Carolina, U.S.
- Education: East Carolina University
- Occupations: puppeteer; author; voice actor
- Writing career
- Genres: Science fiction, fantasy, fantasy of manners
- Notable works: The Calculating Stars; Shades of Milk and Honey; "Evil Robot Monkey"; "For Want of a Nail"
- Notable awards: John W. Campbell Award for Best New Writer (2008); Hugo Award for Best Short Story (2011); Hugo Award for Best Related Work (2013); Hugo Award for Best Novelette (2014); Nebula Award for Best Novel (2018); Hugo Award for Best Novel (2019)
- Website: www.maryrobinettekowal.com

Signature
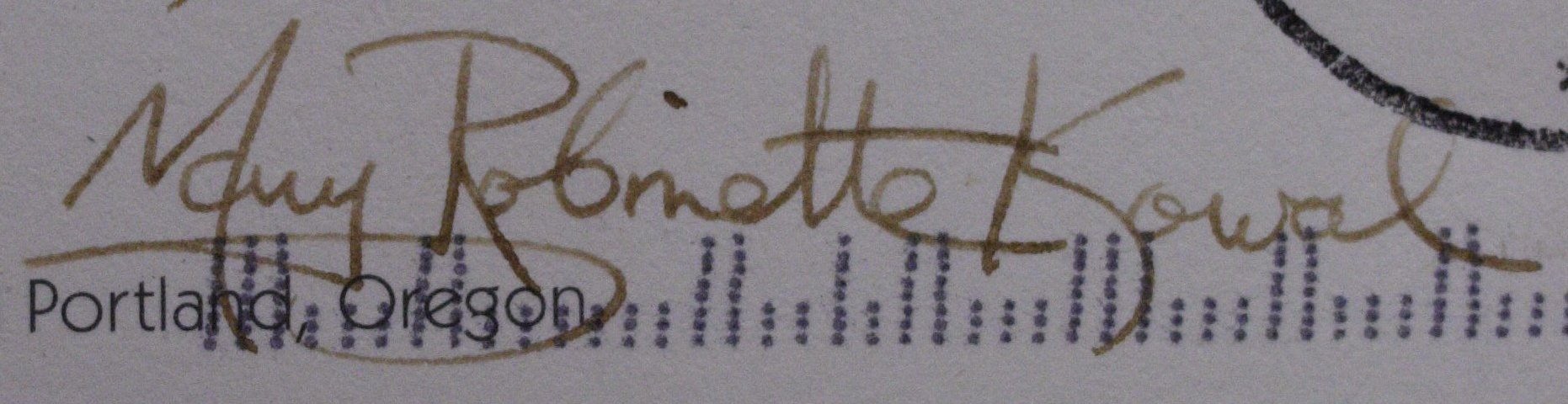

Mary Robinette Kowal (née Harrison; born February 8, 1969) is an American author, translator, art director, and puppeteer. She is a four-time Hugo Award winner, a Nebula Award and Locus Award winner, and served as the president of the Science Fiction and Fantasy Writers of America from 2019-2021. She has worked on puppetry for shows including Jim Henson Productions and the children's show LazyTown.

== Early life ==
Mary Robinette Harrison was born in Raleigh, North Carolina. She was named after both of her grandmothers, and describes her given name, "Mary Robinette," as a double first name.

She attended William G. Enloe High School, and studied at East Carolina University. She graduated with a degree in Art Education with a minor in Theater and Speech. She began work as a professional puppeteer in 1989.

== Career ==
=== Puppetry and art direction ===
Kowal has performed for the Center for Puppetry Arts, Jim Henson Productions; and her own production company, Other Hand Productions. She also worked in Iceland on the children's television show LazyTown for two seasons. She was accepted as a participant in a Sesame Puppetry Workshop.

Kowal served as art director for Shimmer Magazine and in 2010 was named art director for Weird Tales.

=== Literary work ===
In 2008, Kowal won the John W. Campbell Award for Best New Writer.

Kowal's work as an author includes "For Solo Cello, op. 12" (originally published in Cosmos Magazine and reprinted in Science Fiction: The Best of the Year, 2008 Edition) which made the preliminary ballot for the 2007 Nebula Awards. Her fiction has also appeared in Talebones Magazine, Strange Horizons, and Apex Digest, among other venues. Her debut novel Shades of Milk and Honey was nominated for the 2010 Nebula Award for Best Novel. Two of her short fiction works have been nominated for the Hugo Award for Best Short Story: "Evil Robot Monkey" in 2009 and "For Want of a Nail", which won the award in 2011. Her novelette "The Lady Astronaut of Mars" won the 2014 Hugo Award for Best Novelette. The Calculating Stars, the first novel in her Lady Astronaut series, won the 2019 Hugo Award for Best Novel, the 2018 Nebula Award for Best Novel, and the 2018 Sidewise Award for Alternate History.

Kowal translated the 2021 novel The Night Guest, by Hildur Knútsdóttir, from Icelandic into English, which was published in 2024. Kowal studied Icelandic while living in Reykjavík and working for the show LazyTown. It is Kowal's first work of translation.

Kowal served as secretary of the Science Fiction and Fantasy Writers of America for two years. She was elected to the position of SFWA Vice President in 2010, and was elected SFWA President in 2019. In July 2018, after criticism that many authors who were Hugo award finalists at the August 2018 World Science Fiction Convention had not been selected to participate on that year's panels, Kowal took over as programming chair. She also served as chair of the DisCon III the 2021 Worldcon after the original chairs resigned.

=== Audio work ===
After appearing several times as a guest on the podcast Writing Excuses, Kowal became a full-time cast member at the start of the sixth season in 2011.

Kowal is a voice actor and has recorded audiobooks for authors including John Scalzi, Seanan McGuire, Cory Doctorow, Neal Stephenson, and Kage Baker.

== Personal life ==
Kowal has previously lived in Chicago and Nashville. She lives in Denver with her husband, Robert Kowal.

She also owns a calico cat named Elsie who has reportedly learned over 120 words using a set of soundboard buttons to "talk".

Minor planet 52691, discovered by the Spacewatch Project in 1998, is named after her.

== Awards and nominations ==
Year	Title	Award	Category	Result	Ref
2008	—	John W. Campbell Award	—	Won	
2009	"Evil Robot Monkey"	Hugo Award	Hugo–Short Story	Shortlisted	
2010	"First Flight"	Locus Award	Locus–Novelette	Nominated	
2010	Shades of Milk and Honey	Nebula Award	Nebula–Novel	Shortlisted	
2011	Shades of Milk and Honey	Locus Award	Locus–First Novel	Nominated	
2011	"For Want of a Nail"	Hugo Award	Hugo–Short Story	Won	
2011	"Kiss Me Twice"	Nebula Award	Nebula–Novella	Shortlisted	
2012	"Kiss Me Twice"	Hugo Award	Hugo–Novella	Shortlisted	
2012	"Kiss Me Twice"	Locus Award	Locus–Novella	Nominated	
2012	Writing Excuses (Season 6)	Hugo Award	Hugo–Related Work	Shortlisted	
2012	Glamour in Glass	Nebula Award	Nebula–Novel	Shortlisted	
2013	Glamour in Glass	Locus Award	Locus–Fantasy Novel	Nominated	
2013	Writing Excuses (Season 7)	Hugo Award	Hugo–Related Work	Won	
2013	"The Lady Astronaut of Mars"	Locus Award	Locus–Novelette	Nominated	
2014	"The Lady Astronaut of Mars"	Hugo Award	Hugo–Novelette	Won	
2014	Writing Excuses (Season 8)	Hugo Award	Hugo–Related Work	Shortlisted	
2015	"For Want of a Nail"	Seiun Award	Translated Story	Shortlisted	
2017	Ghost Talkers	Mythopoeic Award	Best Fantasy Novel	Shortlisted	
2018	"The Worshipful Society of Glovers"	Locus Award	Locus–Novelette	Nominated	
2018	The Calculating Stars	Nebula Award	Nebula–Novel	Won	
2018	The Calculating Stars	Sidewise Award for Alternate History	Sidewise Award–Long Form	Won	
2019	The Calculating Stars	Hugo Award	Hugo–Novel	Won	
2019	The Calculating Stars	Locus Award	Locus–Scifi Novel	Won	
2019	The Calculating Stars	John W. Campbell Memorial Award	—	Finalist	
2020	The Relentless Moon	Hugo Award	Hugo–Novel	Shortlisted	
2020	The Relentless Moon	Locus Award	Locus–Scifi Novel	Nominated	
2021	The Lady Astronaut Universe	Hugo Award	Hugo–Series	Shortlisted	
2023	The Spare Man	Hugo Award	Hugo–Novel	Nominated	
2025	"Marginalia"	Hugo Award	Short Story	Finalist	
2025	"Marginalia"	Eugie Award	—	Won	
2025	The Martian Contingency	Dragon Awards	Alternate History Novel	Won	

== Works ==
=== Novels and novellas ===
- A Fire in the Heavens. Dragonsteel Entertainment. January 1, 2014. ASIN B0DM19LDB3.
- Forest of Memories. Tordotcom. March 8, 2016. ISBN 9780765383891.
- Ghost Talkers. Tor Books. August 16, 2016. ISBN 9780765378255.
- The Spare Man. Tor Books. October 11, 2022. ISBN 9781250829153.
- Apprehension. Saga Doubles. 2025 (in double-sided book with Red Star Hustle by Sam J. Miller) ISBN 9781668099155 (Note: This edition contains two works; only Apprehension was written by Kowal.)

Glamourist Histories series

- Shades of Milk and Honey. Tor Books, 2010, ISBN 9780765325563
- Glamour in Glass, Tor Books, 2012, ISBN 9780765325570
- Without a Summer, Tor Books, 2013, ISBN 9780765334152
- Valour and Vanity, Tor Books, 2014, ISBN 9780765334169
- Of Noble Family, Tor Books, 2015, ISBN 9780765378361

Lady Astronaut Universe

- The Calculating Stars, Tor Books, 2018, ISBN 9780765378385
- The Fated Sky, Tor Books, 2018, ISBN 9780765398949
- The Relentless Moon, Tor Books, 2020, ISBN 9781250236968
- The Martian Contingency, Tor Books, 2025, ISBN 9781250237057 (originally announced for 2022)
- Silent Spaces, short story collection, funded by Kickstarter, projected publishing date July 2025

=== Short fiction ===
Collections

- Scenting the Dark and Other Stories, Subterranean Press, 2009, ISBN 9781596062672
- Word Puppets, Prime Books, 2015, ISBN 9781607014560

Stories

Title	Year	First published	Notes
"Kiss Me Twice"	2011	Asimov's Science Fiction	Finalist for the Hugo Award for Best Novella
"Forest of Memory"	2014	Tor.com	Novella
"A Fire in the Heavens"	2014	Shadows Beneath	Novelette
"Like Native Things"	2015	Kowal, Mary Robinette (July 2015). "Like Native Things". Asimov's Science Fiction. 39 (7): 10–21.	Novelette
"The Worshipful Society of Glovers"	2017	Kowal, Mary Robinette (Jul–Aug 2017). "The Worshipful Society of Glovers". Uncanny. 17.	Novelette

- "Just Right", The First Line, 2004
- "Rampion", The First Line, 2004
- "The Shocking Affair of the Dutch Steamship Friesland", The First Line, 2004
- "Portrait of Ari", Strange Horizons, 2006
- "Bound Man", Twenty Epics, 2006
- "Cerbo in Vitra ujo", Apex Digest, 2006
- "Locked In", Apex Digest, 2006
- "This Little Pig", Cicada, 2007
- "For Solo Cello, op. 12", Cosmos, 2007; reprinted in Lightspeed Magazine, 2016
- "Horizontal Rain", Apex Online, 2007
- "Death Comes But Twice", Talebones, 2007
- "Some Other Day", All Possible Worlds, 2007
- "Tomorrow and Tomorrow", Gratia Placenti, 2007
- "Suspension and Disbelief", Doctor Who: Short Trips: Destination Prague, 2007
- "Clockwork Chickadee", Clarkesworld Magazine, 2008
- "Scenting the Dark", Apex Online, 2008
- "Waiting for Rain", Subterranean Magazine, 2008
- "Chrysalis", Aoife's Kiss, 2008
- "Evil Robot Monkey", The Solaris Book of New Science Fiction, Vol. 2, 2008 (nominated for the Hugo Award for Best Short Story)
- "At the Edge of Dying", Clockwork Phoenix 2: More Tales of Beauty and Strangeness, 2009
- "Body Language", InterGalactic Medicine Show, 2009
- "The Consciousness Problem", Asimov's Science Fiction, 2009; reprinted in Lightspeed Magazine, 2015
- "First Flight", Tor.com, 2009
- "Ginger Stuyvesant and the Case of the Haunted Nursery", Talebones, 2009
- "Jaiden's Weaver", Diamonds in the Sky: An Astronomical Anthology, 2009
- "Prayer at Dark River", Innsmouth Free Press, 2009
- "Ring Road", Dark Faith Anthology, 2010
- "The Bride Replete", Apex Online, 2010
- "Beyond the Garden Close", Apex Online, 2010
- "Typewriter Triptych", Sharable.net, 2010
- "For Want of a Nail", Asimov's Science Fiction, 2010 (winner of the Hugo Award for Best Short Story)
- "Salt of the Earth", Redstone Science Fiction, 2010
- "American Changeling", Daily Science Fiction, 2010
- "Changement d'itinéraire (Changed Itinerary)", Légendes, 2010
- "Birthright", 2020 Visions, 2010
- "Water to Wine", METAtropolis: Cascadia, 2010
- "Weaving Dreams", Apex, 2012
- "The White Phoenix Feather", Fireside Magazine, 2012
- "The Lady Astronaut of Mars", Audible, 2012, Tor.com, 2013 (winner of the 2014 Hugo Award for Best Novelette)
- "We Interrupt This Broadcast", The Mad Scientist's Guide to World Domination, 2013 - part of the Lady Astronaut Universe series
- "Midnight Hour", Uncanny Magazine, 2015
- "Grinding Time", Popular Science, 2015
- "Your Mama's Adventures in Parenting", Shimmer, 2017
- "Dust to Dust", Fireside Fiction, 2018
- "Nails in My Feet", Uncanny Magazine, 2018
- "Amara's Giraffe", May 2018 - part of the Lady Astronaut Universe series
- "Rockets Red", July 2018 - part of the Lady Astronaut Universe series
- "The Phobos Experience" - in Fantasy & Science Fiction July 2018 - part of the Lady Astronaut Universe series
- "Articulated Restraint", Tor.com, 2019 - part of the Lady Astronaut Universe series
- "Ina's Spark", Uncanny Magazine, 2021
- "By the Pricking of My Robotic Thumbs", New Scientist, 2021
- "Cold Relations", Uncanny Magazine, 2023
- "Marginalia", Uncanny Magazine, 2024
- "In the Moon's House", Reactor, 2024 - part of the Lady Astronaut Universe series
- "With Her Serpent Locks", Uncanny Magazine, 2025
- "To Speak in Silence", Uncanny Magazine, 2025

=== Children's books ===
- Molly on the Moon, ill. Diana Mayo, Roaring Brook Press, 2022, ISBN 9781250259615

=== Audio books ===
- Brandon Sanderson and Mary Robinette Kowal. "The Original" (Recorded Books, 2020) ISBN 9781980062738; eBook (Dragonsteel, 2025) ISBN 9781938570360
