= The Shattering Peace =

2025 novel by John Scalzi

- Author: John Scalzi
- Cover artist: John Harris
- Language: English
- Series: Old Man's War series
- Genre: Science fiction
- Publisher: Tor Books
- Publication date: 2025
- Publication place: United States
- Media type: Digital (E-book, Audiobook); Print (hardcover)
- Pages: 288
- ISBN: 9780765389190
- Preceded by: The End of All Things

The Shattering Peace is a science fiction novel by American writer John Scalzi, the seventh book set in the Old Man's War universe, and takes place ten years after the events of The End of All Things. The book is written as a first-person narrative from the viewpoint of Gretchen Trujillo.

== Premise ==
After a decade of peace, a civil war among the Consu threatens the unstable tripartite agreement between the Colonial Union (CU), the Earth, and the alien Conclave. Gretchen Trujillo, who first appeared in The Last Colony and in Zoe's Tale as a friend of teenage Zoë Boutin Perry, is now an unimportant mid-level diplomat of the CU and is called to take part in a secret mission to save peace.

== Summary ==
Due to the tripart agreement between the Colonial Union, Earth, and the alien Conclave, there has been peace in the galaxy for ten years now. However, some issues are simmering below the diplomatic surface. Gretchen Trujillo, Head of Analysis for the Colonial Union State Department for the Obin — a one person job — along with her Obin assistant and friend Ran are sent on a secret mission to investigate the disappearance of the off-the-record colony Unity, located inside an asteroid formerly occupied by the Obin. This experimental colony includes various species to test if they can coexist peacefully. Many of the human settlers are former Roanoke colonists, among them Dr. Magdy Metwalli, Gretchen's ex-boyfriend. Shortly before the asteroid disappeared, the Consu — the most technologically advanced aliens in known space, who typically ignore other species but have recently shown renewed interest in the Obin — were spotted in that solar system. Thousands of years ago, the Consu artificially uplifted the Obin from primitive beings to intelligent ones, intentionally leaving them without individual self-awareness. It was the humans who later granted the Obin an artificial consciousness. Gretchen's team includes representatives from all the other major factions in space.

When the expedition arrives at the site of the asteroid, there is no evidence of where it might have gone. What they find is a prism containing a single Consu. The Consu rarely condescend to speak to other races, but this one, named Kitty by Gretchen, does speak to her and agrees to tell her what happened to the colony, if she completes a special task. The Consu are on the verge of a civil war, with one faction determined to destroy the colony and Earth in their quest to "perfect" humanity. Kitty has created a groundbreaking form of spaceflight physics, which could make the Consu even more powerful and a greater threat to humans and the Conclave. Now, Gretchen must outsmart the Consu to save not just the colony, but also protect all aliens from their interference. According to Consu belief, species can only achieve perfection through violent conflict. As a result, they believe that the existing peace among the different alien races hinders the advancement of their souls. They embrace this philosophy by deliberately disadvantaging themselves in battles with other species to create a fairer fight, while also engaging in ritualistic yet fierce conflicts within their own factions. Gretchen is to protect Kitty from being taken by his pursuers, who arrive shortly after. She can complete that task with only one other Consu surviving injured and captured, whom she names Bacon and who is clearly hostile towards Kitty for betraying their common goals. After that, Kitty transports the expedition to the hiding place of the missing asteroid.

While the regular skip drive transports a spaceship to chosen coordination in a random universe, which is practically identical to its departure point in the multiverse, this new drive allows to travel to specific universe, which can be totally different. Therefore, Unity colony and the rescue expedition find themselves in a universe where humanity and all other known races have never developed.

...

== Publication history ==
The book was released on September 16, 2025 by Tor Books, including an audiobook by Audible narrated by Tavia Gilbert. In contrast to the two previous volumes of the Old Man's War series, the novel had not been published serialised as an E-book before.

== Reception ==
Publishers Weekly wrote in a pre-publication review of The Shattering Peace that while the novel was light on politics, Scalzi leaned into many other series staples, and that the book would be a treat for diehard fans. Marlene Harris predicted on Library Journal that "fans, who have been waiting for this book for a decade, won’t be disappointed by the latest installment" and noted that it is "highly recommended for readers who love broad sweeping space operas and science fiction with a high quotient of dry humor and witty sarcasm". Kirkus Reviews called it a "classic Scalzi space opera at its wisecracking, politically pointed, and, somehow, fiercely optimistic finest". Mark Yon called it "a real crowd-pleaser, perhaps – but one done with skill, aplomb and heart" in his book review on SFFWorld.

The novel has been nominated for a Locus Award for Best Science Fiction Novel.
