= The Curse of Chalion =

2001 novel by Lois McMaster Bujold

- Cover of first edition (hardcover)
- Author: Lois McMaster Bujold
- Cover artist: Doug Beekman
- Language: English
- Series: World of the Five Gods
- Genre: Fantasy
- Publisher: Eos (HarperCollins)
- Publication date: August 2001
- Publication place: United States
- Media type: Print (hardback & paperback), E-book
- Pages: 442 (hardcover); 502 (mass–market paperback)
- ISBN: 0-380-97901-2
- OCLC: 44979697
- Dewey Decimal: 813/.54 21
- LC Class: PS3552.U397 C87 2001
- Followed by: Paladin of Souls

The Curse of Chalion is a 2001 fantasy novel by American writer Lois McMaster Bujold. In 2002 it won the Mythopoeic Fantasy Award for Adult Literature and was nominated for the Hugo, World Fantasy, and Locus Fantasy Awards in 2002. The series that it began, World of the Five Gods, won the Hugo Award for Best Series in 2018.

Both The Curse of Chalion and its sequel Paladin of Souls (2003) are set in the fictional landlocked medieval kingdom of Chalion. The prequel The Hallowed Hunt (2005) takes place in the Weald to the south of Chalion and two to three hundred years earlier.

== Plot summary ==
Cazaril is a noble in the land of Chalion, but was betrayed and sold into slavery to the Roknari. The people of Chalion and neighboring lands worship five gods (Father, Mother, Son, Daughter, and Bastard), while the Roknari deny the Bastard's divinity; each faith group considers the other to be infidels. After nearly two years as a galley slave, he returns to a regional court where he once served as a page and is hired as tutor to Iselle (second in line for the throne of Chalion after her brother Teidez) and her handmaiden Betriz, to whom he is attracted. Iselle and Teidez's mother Ista also lives with them, but is considered mad.

Teidez and Iselle accept an invitation to stay at the capital, accompanied by Betriz, Cazaril, and other domestics. There Cazaril encounters his betrayer Dondo, whose brother Martou is chancellor to the ailing monarch Orico. Orico spends much time in his menagerie, run by the Roknari exile Umegat. The corrupt Dondo befriends Teidez to further his own ambitions, introducing the boy to various vices. He also connives to arrange a marriage between himself and a horrified Iselle. In desperation, Cazaril calls on the Bastard for a miracle of death magic, which would kill both himself and Dondo. Dondo dies, but Cazaril does not, finding himself a saint—an agent of the gods, gifted with second sight. With the help of Umegat, another saint, he learns that the royal family of Chalion is under a generation-old curse, and that Orico is only sustained through the cleansing magic of the sacred animals in the menagerie. He also learns that Dondo's soul and the Bastard's death demon are both trapped inside a tumor in his body, with the demon trying to bring about his death so it can return to the gods with the required two souls.

Deceived by Dondo, Teidez destroys the menagerie and injures Umegat, but a wound he sustains in the process becomes infected and proves fatal. Orico collapses, leaving Iselle soon to ascend the throne, but the real power at court is wielded by Martou, who spreads rumors that she is unstable like her mother. Cazaril informs Iselle of the curse, and theorizes that since Ista married into the curse, Iselle might be able to marry out of it. She secretly sends him to arrange her marriage to the heir of Ibra, a neighbouring country. He speaks to Ista on the way, who tells him of a prophecy that the curse can be broken by a man "willing to lay down his life three times for the House of Chalion."

In Ibra, he finds that he and the heir, Bergon, have already met. They were galley slaves together, and he voluntarily took a severe beating meant for the boy rather than seeing him raped. Informing Bergon of the curse, they convince Bergon's father to agree to the marriage. They return to Chalion, fighting through an ambush set by Martou. Iselle flees Martou's custody, and she and Bergon are married. To Cazaril's horror, he discovers that, instead of releasing Iselle, the curse has descended on Bergon as well.

Martou and his men try to kill Bergon and recapture Iselle. Cazaril fights them off, enabling the couple to escape, but is captured. Martou runs him through with his sword, hitting Cazaril's tumor and releasing the demon, which disincorporates the souls of Cazaril, Dondo, and Martou. Cazaril has a mystical experience where the Daughter reveals that his three willing deaths (taking the fatal beating for Bergon, invoking death magic for Iselle, and being stabbed by Martou) have made him a suitable vessel through which she can reach into the physical world and lift the curse. She then returns him to his body as the demon leaves with the souls of Dondo and Martou.

Iselle is crowned as ruler of Chalion, with Bergon as her consort and their children to inherit both lands. Cazaril is made chancellor, and he and Betriz marry.

== Allusions to actual history and geography ==
The Curse of Chalion and other books in the World of the Five Gods series are set in a world loosely based on southern Europe during the time of the Reconquista, or Spanish Reconquest. The states of Chalion, Ibra, and Brajar are fictional counterparts of Castile and León, Aragon, and Portugal, respectively. In Bujold's world, these states are in conflict with invaders from the north, the Roknari, who correspond to the Moors of North Africa and al-Andalus.

Characters in The Curse of Chalion also have historical equivalents. Iselle of Chalion is based on Isabella I of Castile, Bergon of Ibra is based on Ferdinand II of Aragon, and their secret marriage reflects the secret betrothal of Isabella and Ferdinand. The character Teidez corresponds to Alfonso Prince of Asturias.

== Reception ==
The book has received a number of reviews. It was nominated for the 2002 Hugo Award for Best Novel. The World of the Five Gods series won the Hugo Award for Best Series in 2018.
