= Paladin of Souls =

Novel by Lois McMaster Bujold

- Cover of first edition (hardcover)
- Author: Lois McMaster Bujold
- Cover artist: David Bowers
- Language: English
- Series: World of the Five Gods
- Genre: Fantasy
- Publisher: Eos (HarperCollins)
- Publication date: September 23, 2003
- Publication place: United States
- Media type: Print (hardback & paperback) & E-book
- Pages: 456 (hardcover); 496 (paperback)
- Awards: Hugo Award for Best Novel, Nebula Award for Best Novel, Locus Award for Best Fantasy Novel (all 2004)
- ISBN: 0-380-97902-0
- OCLC: 51647768
- Dewey Decimal: 813/.54 21
- LC Class: PS3552.U397 P355 2003
- Preceded by: The Curse of Chalion
- Followed by: The Hallowed Hunt

Paladin of Souls is a 2003 fantasy novel by American writer Lois McMaster Bujold. It won the Hugo, Locus, and Nebula awards. It is a sequel to The Curse of Chalion, and takes place approximately three years later. The series that it is part of, World of the Five Gods, won the Hugo Award for Best Series in 2018.

Both Paladin of Souls and its prequel Curse of Chalion (2001) are set in the landlocked medieval kingdom of Chalion, which is a fictional equivalent of Castile and León during the time of the Reconquista, or Spanish Reconquest.

== Synopsis ==
The novel follows Ista, mother of Iselle, the young ruler of Chalion. After the lifting of the curse on her family and the death of her aged mother, Ista finds herself bored and restless. To escape from her guardians (who think she is partially mad), she sets out on a pilgrimage with the dy Gura brothers (minor characters from the earlier story) for protection; Liss, a feisty and clever courier girl; and dy Cabon, a plump priest of the Bastard (one of the five gods of the Chalion universe) as her 'spiritual guide'. The Bastard, god of disasters and of things out of season, guides Ista's path, despite her strong resistance.

The party is overrun and captured by a troop of Roknari raiders from the adjacent principality of Jokona, then rescued by a patrol led by Arhys, lord of the nearby Castle Porifors, a strong leader of men and very handsome to boot. Though she is attracted to him, she learns that he is the son of a man she had helped kill (in an ill-fated attempt to raise the curse). She also learns Arhys has a very young and very beautiful wife named Cattilara.

Once in the castle, Ista discovers a mystery. Lord Illvin, Arhys's half-brother, is unconscious except for afternoon wakings that match Arhys' naps. She has seen Illvin before, though, in a baffling dream sent by the Bastard. Ista, despite her attempts to avoid becoming once again a tool of a god, lets her curiosity get the better of her. She is saddened to discover that Arhys is actually dead. Cattilara has managed to force a demon to keep her husband "alive" by transferring to him some of Illvin's vitality, but Ista can see that both men are fading fast. To complicate matters further, Illvin and Ista are attracted to each other.

Then Porifors is besieged by a new force of Roknari from Jokona that includes its Prince, Sordso, and his mother, Princess Joen. The latter is an elderly daughter of the Golden General, a man of destiny blessed with many god-bestowed gifts whose death by magic had the side effect of creating the curse. Joen has created a troop of demon-ridden sorcerers, including her own son. She carefully strengthened each demon by "feeding" them souls with the talents she required. Joen seeks to fulfill the Golden General's thwarted destiny and conquer the non-Roknari realms.

As Porifors and its defenders suffer demonic attacks, Arhys and a picked troop make a night raid that kills some of the sorcerers, but eventually they are overwhelmed. Ista allows herself be taken as a hostage into the Princess' lair, supposedly to end the siege, but in reality to send the remaining demons back to the Bastard's care and defeat Joen. Ista accepts the Bastard's offer of a job in his service: to exorcise other demons let loose upon the land. Lord Illvin comes as a bonus.

== Awards ==
- Hugo Award for Best Novel (2004)
- Locus Award for Best Fantasy Novel (2004)
- Nebula Award for Best Novel (2004)
- Hugo Award for Best Series as part of the World of the Five Gods series (2018)
