= Stormsong =

Fantasy novel by C. L. Polk

- Author: C. L. Polk
- Language: English
- Series: The Kingston Cycle #2
- Genre: Fantasy literature; Gaslamp fantasy
- Publisher: Tor Books
- Publication date: February 11, 2020
- Media type: Print, ebook, audiobook
- ISBN: 9780765398994
- Preceded by: Witchmark
- Followed by: Soulstar

Stormsong is a 2020 gaslamp fantasy novel by Canadian author C. L. Polk. It is the second book in The Kingston Cycle series, which takes place in a fictional world in a country called Aeland. Stormsong continues the overarching political fantasy plot begun in Witchmark, the first book in the series, while also featuring a self-contained murder mystery and romance unique to this volume. It was first published by Tor Books.

== Synopsis ==
Having helped her brother Miles end the practice of draining the strength of witches to power the realm, Dame Grace Hensley is involved in the politics of a nation experiencing both internal and external crisis. There is no simple replacement for the witches' power, the war continues without an end in sight, and court politics are potentially deadly. Additionally, the fae-like and powerful Amaranthines have arrived to hold the human realms accountable for their actions. With the prospect of revolution present, Grace must also deal with the reporter Avia Jessup, toward whom she is developing romantic feelings, though their interests sometimes conflict.

== Reception ==
Stormsong was ranked 11th in the Locus Award vote for Best Fantasy Novel.

In a starred review, Publishers Weekly calls Stormsong a "superb sequel" that blends "political intrigue, witchcraft, and queer romance". The review further adds that "Polk’s ambitious worldbuilding never encumbers her assured, action-packed pacing, deep characters, and genuine emotion. This delectable treat is a worthy follow-up to her debut." Catherine Rockwood, in a review for Strange Horizons, also calls Stormsong "a rewarding follow-up to a terrific debut novel" and praises the pacing of the action, though she unfavorably compares the romance of Grace and Avia to that of Miles and Tristan in Witchmark. The Library Journal review asserts that "familiar and favorite characters support the young woman who takes center stage, while Polk's charming prose frames an original and witty story filled with action and romantic tension."

The Kirkus review describes Stormsong as "A thoughtful and passionate depiction of one woman’s struggle to discover her truest self." Locus notes that while "not a perfect book", Stormsong includes "delightful fantasy elements", a compelling inner journey of the main character, Grace, and a compelling political context. According to the review, these elements, along with fast-paced action and a narrative "unique enough to be entertaining and familiar enough not to be mystifying", result in a "cracking read" and a worthy addition to fantasy literature.

== Characters ==
- Dame Grace Hensley: Having helped bring down the horrific and oppressive system that exploited Aelanders with magic powers, Grace must now navigate a complex maze, striving to appease her queen, meet the Amaranthines' demands for justice for Laneer, and find a way to liberate the imprisoned and oppressed witches of Aeland, all while attempting to save her country from a calamity for which she bears partial responsibility. Forced to take over as chancellor, Grace uses the political skills and machinations she learned from her father, Sir Christopher. Unlike her father, Grace is developing a moral compass and wants to achieve a just solution to the kingdom's problems.
- Avia Jessup: An intrepid investigative journalist, Avia is looking for an explosive political exposé to make her career, but finds herself falling for the young new chancellor, whose interest is to hide some of the more appalling atrocities of the regime from the public.
- Sir Christopher Hensley: The amoral chancellor of Aeland and head of the circle of mages that both exploited magic users from the underclasses and protected Aeland from destructive weather patterns. Sir Christopher is involved in conspiracies to maintain the elite's power in Aeland.
- Miles Singer: Grace's brother and Tristan's fiancé. He's a doctor at a veteran's hospital, and estranged from his aristocratic family. Miles was the protagonist of Witchmark, and in Stormsong is a secondary character.
- Tristan: An Amaranthine. The Amaranthines are a fae-like race that showed up at the end of Witchmark to investigate both Aeland's internal crimes against its citizens and possible war crimes in the conflict with neighboring Laneer. Tristan bridges the gap between the races, and helps Grace in her attempt to thwart an assassination threat against Queen Constantina.
- Robin Thorpe: A hospital colleague of Miles'. A Black woman from working-class Riverside, Robin is asked to help leverage a secret group of magic wielders to help save Aeland. These witches evaded persecution by hiding their powers and living underground, and Robin does not trust Grace to protect their interests. Robin's objectives prove to be key to Grace's decisions to embark upon a more difficult, but more ethical, path.
- Queen Constantina: Queen of Aeland, Constantina is hostile to the changes taking place in her realm and the interference of the Amaranthines.
- Prince Severin: The heir to the crown, Severin is not above conspiring against his own mother or romantically pursuing Grace to further his own purposes.
- Grand Duchess Aife: Leader of the Amaranthines, Aife agreed to suspend judgment against Aeland at the end of Witchmark due to the protagonists bringing down the deadly incarceral system and convincing her that only a limited number of the elite class was involved. Now, she and her court are residing in Aeland's capital, Kingston as guests of the royal family—waiting to see how all the plot strands come together, to determine whether punishment should be applied in the interest of justice.
