= The Kingston Cycle =

Book series by C. L. Polk

- Witchmark (2018); Stormsong (2020); Soulstar (2021)
- Author: C. L. Polk
- Country: United States
- Language: English
- Genre: fantasy
- Publisher: Tor Books
- Published: May 19, 2018 – February 16, 2021
- No. of books: 3

The Kingston Cycle is a series of gaslamp fantasy novels by Canadian author C. L. Polk. The series includes three books, and takes place in a fantasy realm based on Edwardian England, in the context of a cruel war reminiscent of World War I. The first book in the series, Witchmark, received numerous accolades, rave reviews, and the 2019 World Fantasy Award—Novel. The series as a whole was positively received and was a finalist for the 2022 Hugo Award for Best Series.

Each of the novels in the series includes a self-contained romantic plot involving different LGBT couples who must solve a murder mystery, while a larger story arc spans all three novels in the series, which is a feminist, political, revolutionary fantasy tale about the uprising of the underclass and the importance of community and collective political resistance.

== Series books ==
No.	Title	Publication date	Counts	ISBN
1	Witchmark	June 19, 2018	320 pages	9781250162687
Miles Singer returned from the war between his native Aeland and the kingdom of Laneer a different man – literally. He has adopted a false identity to work as a doctor in a veteran's hospital and hide from his family, who would either force him to serve their political interests or commit him to a witch asylum. Miles' powers as a healer are exposed, however, when he investigates a suspicious death of a patient, leading him to discover unimaginable atrocities committed by his country. He's in danger of being pulled back into his family's orbit, or else needing to trust in and rely on the kindness of the most gorgeous man he's ever met.
2	Stormsong	February 11, 2020	352 pages	9780765398994
Having helped her brother Miles end the horrific practice of draining the strength of witches to power the realm, Dame Grace Hensley now finds herself entangled in the intrigues of a nation in both internal and external crisis. There's no easy replacement for the witches' power, the war is still raging with no end in sight, and court politics are potentially deadly. To make matters worse, the fae-like and powerful Amarithenes have arrived to hold the human realms accountable for their actions. And with the prospect of revolution in the air, Grace must also contend with the tenacious reporter, Avia Jessup, who is capturing her heart but whose interests sometimes conflict with her own.
3	Soulstar	February 16, 2021	304 pages	9781250203571
Like many others with powers, Robin Thorpe has lived secretively, hiding her abilities from all but her clan in working-class Riverside. As the witches continue to be freed from enslavement, Robin is reunited with her long-absent spouse, Zelind. Together, they team up with Miles and Grace to end the regime's ravages upon the kingdom. Robin finds herself leading a revolution that will change Aeland forever, ensuring it becomes more free and just. While challenging the sexist, classist, and oppressive realities of the current system in the name of the people, Robin and Zelind must also contend with reintegrating their divergent lives as a couple, an endeavor with challenges of its own.

== Reception ==
=== Awards ===
Year	Award	Category	Book	Result	Ref
2018	Nebula Award	Best Novel	Witchmark	Nominated	
2018	Lambda Literary Award	Science Fiction, Fantasy and Horror	Witchmark	Nominated	
2018	Goodreads Choice Awards	Debut Author	Witchmark	Nominated	
2019	Locus Award	Best First Novel	Witchmark	Nominated	
2019	World Fantasy Award	Novel	Witchmark	Won	
2019	Prix Aurora Award	Best Novel (English)	Witchmark	Nominated	
2022	Prix Aurora Award	Best Novel (English)	Soulstar	Nominated	
2022	Hugo Award	Hugo Award for Best Series	The Kingston Cycle	Nominated	

=== Accolades ===
Year	Publication	Work	Category	Ref
2022	Reader's Digest	The Kingston Cycle	Top 25 Best Fantasy Series Ever Written	
2020	Time Magazine	Witchmark	The 100 Best Fantasy Books of All Time	
2018	Publishers Weekly	Witchmark	One of the best books of 2018	
2018	BuzzFeed	Witchmark	One of the best books of 2018	
2018	Chicago Review	Witchmark	One of the best books of 2018	
2018	BookPage	Witchmark	One of the best books of 2018	

== Adaptations ==
In August 2021 it was announced that the rights to The Kingston Cycle were acquired by 1212 Entertainment, and that the novels would be adapted into a television series by screenwriter Alyssa Clark.
