= Soulstar (disambiguation) =

Soulstar is a 1994 video game.

Soulstar may also refer to:

- Soulstar (Musiq album), 2003
- Soulstar (Boy Soda album), 2025
- Soulstar, a 2021 The Kingston Cycle novel by C. L. Polk
