= The Human Division =

2013 novel by John Scalzi

- Cover of hardcover edition
- Author: John Scalzi
- Cover artist: John Harris
- Language: English
- Series: Old Man's War series
- Genre: Science fiction
- Publisher: Tor Books
- Publication date: 2013
- Publication place: United States
- Media type: Digital (E-book); Print (hardcover & paperback)
- Pages: 432
- ISBN: 978-0-7653-3351-3
- Preceded by: Zoe's Tale
- Followed by: The End of All Things

The Human Division is a science fiction novel by American writer John Scalzi, the fifth book set in the Old Man's War universe. The book is written multiperspectively as a subjective third-person narrative with Harry Wilson, who first appeared in Old Man's War as a friend of John Perry and who also played a prominent role in The Ghost Brigades, being the main point of view character. In contrast to the previous novels, it does not have a continuous plot line, but consists of several more or less independent episodes.

== Plot synopsis ==
The story focuses on a "B Team" led by the resourceful Lieutenant Harry Wilson, and the crew of the diplomatic starship Clarke, tasked with navigating the complex political landscape and preventing all-out war. The book delves into themes of unity and division within humanity, set against a backdrop of interstellar conflict and political intrigue.

The Colonial Union (CU), which has been protecting Earth from alien threats, has been keeping Earth deliberately ignorant and serving as a recruitment pool for its military. Earth now knows the truth and is invited to join the Conclave, a union of over 400 alien species all interested in cooperating to continue colonizing the galaxy, creating a major dilemma for the CU, because humanity is not on good terms with many other races. Wilson and his team are deployed to handle the fallout, facing unexpected challenges and sabotage attempts from unknown parties. The CU has to refocus from purely military objectives and colonial expansion to the forging of bonds between human and non-human civilizations by diplomacy. The "B Team" navigates difficult diplomatic crises and mysterious sabotage by an unseen enemy aimed at undermining human unity. These events culminate in earth station and its space elevator being destroyed during diplomatic negotiations by former Colonial Defense Forces ships controlled by the saboteurs and with the result of earth being further alienated from the CU. Who is behind this terrorist attack remains unclear.

== Publication history ==
The book was published at e-book retailers between 15 January and 9 April 2013 as digital serials with thirteen loosely connected episodes, so that it can be viewed as a collection of short stories.

The episode titles with the release dates in 2013 are as follows:

1. The B-Team (15 January)
2. Walk the Plank (22 January)
3. We Only Need the Heads (29 January)
4. A Voice in the Wilderness (5 February)
5. Tales From the Clarke (12 February)
6. The Back Channel (19 February)
7. The Dog King (26 February)
8. The Sound of Rebellion (5 March)
9. The Observers (12 March)
10. This Must Be the Place (19 March)
11. A Problem of Proportion (26 March)
12. The Gentle Art of Cracking Heads (2 April)
13. Earth Below, Sky Above (9 April)

On 14 May 2013, the serial was collected into a full-length novel and supplemented with the first tale of Lieutenant Harry Wilson, After the Coup, and a short story that was not part of the serialization, Hafte Sorvalh Eats a Churro and Speaks to the Youth of Today. This short story was released at Tor.com and After The Coup can be found there as well.

== Sequel ==
The e-book serialization was a success for Tor Books so it contracted with Scalzi to write a sequel, later titled The End of All Things that was also released serially in June 2015.
