= The Hallowed Hunt =

2005 fantasy novel by Lois McMaster Bujold

- Dustjacket of first hardbound edition
- Author: Lois McMaster Bujold
- Cover artist: David Bowers
- Language: English
- Series: World of the Five Gods
- Genre: Fantasy
- Publisher: Eos (HarperCollins)
- Publication date: May 24, 2005
- Publication place: United States
- Media type: Print (Hardcover and Paperback) & E-Book
- Pages: 480 (first edition, hardcover)
- ISBN: 0-06-057462-3
- OCLC: 56840415
- Dewey Decimal: 813/.54 22
- LC Class: PS3552.U397 H35 2005
- Preceded by: Paladin of Souls

The Hallowed Hunt is a fantasy novel by American writer Lois McMaster Bujold, published in 2005. It placed fourth in the annual Locus Poll for best fantasy novel, and the series it is a part of, World of the Five Gods, won the Hugo Award for Best Series in 2018.

== Context in the series ==
This novel is set in the same world as two of Bujold's previous fantasies, The Curse of Chalion (2001) and Paladin of Souls (2003), but in a country ("the Weald") well to the south of the Ibran Peninsula, i.e. with a cooler climate. The earlier books introduce a setting in which technology and society parallel those of a late medieval Earth, with a strong but decentralized religion of five gods. Many of the conflicts in those books have to do with the relationships between human protagonists and demons (spiritual beings which cause disruption) capable of co-inhabiting their bodies. The action of The Hallowed Hunt takes place about 250 years earlier, in a region which still has strong memories of the culture which preceded conquest from the north and imposition of the five-god religion, centuries earlier. In this earlier culture, leaders practiced shamanism. This involves the intentional accumulation of the spirits of dying "kin" animals, one by one, into new animal bodies, with the powerful final spirit taken into a warrior. This is not the same as demonic possession, but it involves a similar problem of acknowledging a divided spiritual self. While Curse of Chalion focuses on the Daughter (teacher and nurturer) among the five gods, and Paladin of Souls on the Bastard (master of disasters), The Hallowed Hunt presents the warrior realm of the Son.

== Synopsis ==
The principal characters are Ingrey, a disgraced and landless aristocrat, who received a wolf spirit in childhood and spends most of the story discovering how, why and to what effect; Ijada, the heiress of a desolate woods in which the Darthacans finally conquered the warriors of the Weald 400 years earlier; and Wencel, who has extended his life for centuries by taking over the bodies of others, mainly his own descendants, for a purpose that is finally revealed.

At a time when the Hallow King is dying, Ingrey is sent by his lord to take custody of Ijada, who has killed one of the king's sons, and bring her to the capital. Ingrey immediately learns that the victim was attempting to accumulate the spirits of animals, including a leopard which now dwells in Ijada. As they travel together, Ingrey realizes on the one hand that he is in love with Ijada and on the other that he feels compelled to try to kill her. With the help of a sorceress and Ijada, he gets rid of this geas, but in the process he frees the wolf spirit he acquired as a boy. They meet Wencel, who seems to have many answers to the questions they have, but also an obsession with the long-ago loss of the independent culture of the region, when the Darthacans conquered the old Hallow King and replaced the old religion with Quintarianism. Wencel's cruel purpose involves the fusing of the old and new kingship in a vengeful act, and Ingrey, with the help of Ijada and others, must prevail to save the souls bound by magic.
