= October Daye =

Series of urban fantasy novels by American author Seanan McGuire

- Rosemary and Rue (2009); A Local Habitation (2010); An Artificial Night (2010); Late Eclipses (2011); One Salt Sea (2011); Ashes of Honor (2012); Chimes at Midnight (2013); The Winter Long (2014); A Red-Rose Chain (2015); Once Broken Faith (2016); The Brightest Fell (2017); Night and Silence (2018); The Unkindest Tide (2019); A Killing Frost (2020); When Sorrows Come (2021); Be the Serpent (2022); Sleep No More (2023); The Innocent Sleep (2023); Silver and Lead (2025); A Divided Duty (2026)
- Author: Seanan McGuire
- Cover artist: Chris McGrath
- Country: United States
- Language: English
- Genre: Urban Fantasy
- Publisher: DAW Books (1-18); Tor Books (19- )
- Published: 2009-Present
- No. of books: 20
- Website: www.seananmcguire.com

October Daye is a New York Times Best Selling series of urban fantasy novels by American author Seanan McGuire. They follow October "Toby" Daye, a half-fae changeling and reluctant hero of the realm.

== Overview ==
After being missing for fourteen years, private investigator October "Toby" Daye returns to a human world that presumes her dead. Reluctantly, she returns to the politics and dangers of faerie society and gradually becomes both feared and celebrated as a hero among the fae.

In addition to episodic villains, the series contains several overarching plot lines and antagonists. The demigod-like Firstborn Eira Rosynhwyr repeatedly confronts Toby in her attempts to gain power. The local Queen has a seemingly unfounded vendetta against Toby. Centuries-old conflict between Oberon, Titania, Maeve, and Janet of Caughterha threatens the safety of Toby and her allies.

== Books ==
1. Rosemary and Rue: After attempting to cut off ties to all her friends and allies in Faerie, Toby unwillingly returns to the world of the fae to investigate Evening Winterrose's murder.
2. A Local Habitation: Toby investigates strange occurrences in the County of Tamed Lightning at the request of her liege lord Sylvester Torquill.
3. An Artificial Night: Toby works to rescue fae and human children who have been kidnapped by faerie boogeyman Blind Michael.
4. Late Eclipses: Toby races to save her friends from a mysterious illness and learns secrets about her own family.
5. One Salt Sea: Toby tries to prevent war between land and sea by searching for the Duchess of Saltmist's missing sons.
6. Ashes of Honor: Toby searches for a missing changeling whose powers may rip apart the fabric of the world itself.
7. Chimes at Midnight: While fighting the goblin fruit epidemic in the city, Toby searches for the rightful ruler of the Kingdom in the Mists.
8. The Winter Long: The return of old villains leads to revelations about Toby's past and future.
9. A Red-Rose Chain: Toby is tasked with preventing war between the Kingdom in the Mists and the Kingdom of Silences.
10. Once Broken Faith: A conclave is called to discuss the future of elf-shot.
11. The Brightest Fell: Toby's mother blackmails her into finding her long-lost half-sister.
12. Night and Silence: Toby's daughter is kidnapped by an old enemy.
13. The Unkindest Tide: Toby's debts with the Luidaeg have finally come due.
14. A Killing Frost: Toby is tasked with finding the missing Simon Torquill, who gave up his way home until Oberon returns.
15. When Sorrows Come: Toby visits the High Court of the Westlands in order to get married.
16. Be the Serpent: An old friend and ally turns out to have been an enemy in disguise for this entire time.
17. Sleep No More: Toby wakes up in someone else's fairy tale, in which her life is very different.
18. The Innocent Sleep: The events of the previous book, told from Tybalt's point of view.
19. Silver and Lead: A heavily pregnant Toby must locate missing artifacts.
20. A Divided Duty: Toby is torn between caring for her newborn daughter and keeping the world of Faerie - and her found family - safe

== Short stories ==
McGuire has released more than forty short stories and novellas set in the October Daye universe. Some are available through anthologies alongside authors such as Charlaine Harris, Kelley Armstrong, and Tanya Huff. Others are available as bonus content in the print editions of her books (beginning with Once Broken Faith), her website, and to her Patreon subscribers.

The short stories typically explore alternate character points of view and form their own story arcs over multiple installments. Recurring narrators include love interest Tybalt; Toby's Firstborn aunt the Luidaeg; and characters in the Lorden family. Other one-off stories continue events of the novels from minor character perspectives.

== Reception ==
The October Daye series has appeared on the New York Times Best Seller list.

Publishers Weekly calls the books "a pulse-pounding, often surprising tale" and "a tightly plotted adventure." The magazine says of Night and Silence, "McGuire continues to put her heroes through harrowing emotional and physical dangers while peeling back more layers in an increasingly complicated mythos. There are significant payoffs for longtime readers as she calls back to numerous elements from previous books. Toby’s combination of pragmatic heroism and relentless self-destruction makes her a compelling heroine in a secret folklore-filled world that still feels fresh and dangerous after all this time."

American actress Felicia Day says it is, "Top of my urban-paranormal series list!"

=== Awards ===
The October Daye series was nominated for the Hugo Award for Best Series in 2017, 2019, 2021, 2023, 2024, and 2026.

"Rat-Catcher" and "In Sea-Salt Tears" were both nominated for the 2013 Hugo Award for Best Novelette.

== Publication history ==
The first nine books were originally published as mass market paperbacks. Book Ten, The Brightest Fell (2017), was the first volume released in hardcover.

In 2019, DAW Books released a Rosemary and Rue 10th Anniversary Special Edition that included a new bonus novella, Strangers in Court.

The first three books of the series have been translated to German. The first two books are available in French.
