= InCryptid =

Series of urban fantasy novels by American author Seanan McGuire

- Discount Armageddon; Midnight Blue-Light Special; Half-Off Ragnarok; Pocket Apocalypse; Chaos Choreography; Magic for Nothing; Tricks for Free; That Ain't Witchcraft; Imaginary Numbers; Calculated Risks; Spelunking Through Hell; Backpacking Through Bedlam; Aftermarket Afterlife; Installment Immortality; Butteryfly Effects
- Author: Seanan McGuire
- Cover artist: Aly Fell, Lee Moyer
- Country: United States
- Language: English
- Genre: Urban Fantasy
- Publisher: DAW Books (1-13); Tor Books (14- )
- Published: 2012-Present
- No. of books: 15
- Website: www.seananmcguire.com

InCryptid is a series of urban fantasy novels by American author Seanan McGuire, published by DAW Books. They follow multiple generations of a family of cryptozoologists who protect supernatural beings from discovery by humankind.

== Books ==
1. Discount Armageddon: Verity Price splits her time between professional dance and acting as protector for the cryptid community of Manhattan. Which means she won't let cryptid-killing Covenant agent Dominic DeLuca invade her turf without a fight...
2. Midnight Blue-Light Special: When the Covenant of St. George sends a team to NYC, Verity teams up with Dominic to protect both the cryptid community and her extended family from the Covenant's attentions.
3. Half-Off Ragnarok: Alex Price disguises studies of reptilian cryptids by working as a herpetologist for the Columbus Zoo. A series of petrifications leads him to look to the local Gorgon community, even as he tries to keep his extracurriculars a secret from his maybe-girlfriend and fellow zoologist Shelby Tanner.
4. Pocket Apocalypse: Alex and Shelby head to Australia so Alex can serve as an expert on werewolf epidemics.
5. Chaos Choreography: Verity returns to her performer roots with an all-star season of reality show Dance or Die, which is living up to the "dying" part of its name.
6. Magic for Nothing: Antimony "Annie" Price goes undercover with the Covenant of St. George in order to make sure her family stays safely out of their reach.
7. Tricks for Free: Annie has settled into self-imposed exile at a Florida amusement park, found a teacher to help her master her sorcerer powers, and still seems to be running into death and destruction at every turn.
8. That Ain't Witchcraft: Annie and her friends take refuge in a tiny Maine town, where Annie meets another sorcerer and learns more about the Crossroads.
9. Imaginary Numbers: Sarah Zellaby, adoptive cousin of the Price siblings, faces her destiny as an psychic, potentially psychopathic, alien wasp.
10. Calculated Risks: Sarah, Annie, and their friends are trapped in another dimension and must find a way to get everyone home safely.
11. Spelunking Through Hell: After half a century of searching, Alice Price-Healy finally makes a breakthrough in finding her long-lost husband.
12. Backpacking Through Bedlam: Alice and Company return to Earth, where they find themselves in the middle of a war between the Price family and the Covenant of St. George.
13. Aftermarket Afterlife: Mary presides over the family reunion as Alice et al return to the family, and the Covenant of Saint George launches a multi strike attack on North America's cryptids and the Price family.
14. Installment Immortality: Mary Dunlavy takes on a new mission from the anima mundi to stop the Covenant of St. George from imprisoning America's ghosts.
15. Butterfly Effects: Sarah Zellaby's trial.

== Short stories ==
McGuire has released more than fifty short stories and novellas set in the InCryptid universe. They are available through anthologies, bonus content in the print editions of her books, her website, and to her Patreon subscribers.

== Reception ==
Michael Jones of Tor.com praised the series for its characterization, humor, and worldbuilding, which draws from diverse myths from around the world, as well as those of McGuire's own invention. His review of Half-Off Ragnarok called it "slightly over-the-top fun, a genuinely entertaining good time" and "[a] fast-paced, non-taxing sort of brain candy for the urban fantasy fan". Liz Bourke called Chaos Choreography "a magnificent romp through reality television, talent shows, murder, and snake cults"

Publishers Weekly calls Tricks for Free "a joyous romp that juggles action, magic, and romance to great effect" and praised Calculated Risks for "injecting her unique mix of pop culture awareness, sly humor, and creepy weirdness into an urban fantasy framework."

Charlaine Harris says "The cast of characters in the InCryptid books is always delightful, and they’re great fun."

=== Awards and recognition ===
- Nominated for the Hugo Award for Best Series in 2018 and 2020 and 2025.
- New York Times Best Selling series

== Publication history ==
- The first nine books in the series were published as mass market paperbacks. Spelunking Through Hell (2022) was the first book published as a trade paperback.
