= Witchmark =

Fantasy novel

- First edition
- Author: C. L. Polk
- Language: English
- Series: The Kingston Cycle #1
- Genre: Fantasy literature; Gaslamp fantasy
- Publisher: Tor Books
- Publication date: June 19, 2018
- Media type: Print, ebook
- ISBN: 9781250162687
- Followed by: Stormsong

Witchmark is a 2018 fantasy novel by Canadian author C. L. Polk. It features a murder mystery set in a secondary world in a country called Aeland, and has been described as gaslamp fantasy. Witchmark won the World Fantasy Award for Best Novel in 2019. It was first published by Tor Books.

== Synopsis ==
=== Premise ===
In the nation of Aeland, magic is stigmatized. Witches are considered mentally ill. If they are identified and convicted, they are sent to asylums. Unbeknownst to the general public, the country's climate is only sustainable because of magic. The Queen's Invisibles, a group of wealthy mages, work to maintain the climate. Mages with the ability of "storm singing" are highly valued; those with other abilities are not. Mages who cannot sing storms are classified as "secondaries"; they are enslaved and used as magical batteries by their storm singers.

Christopher Hensley Jr. is a mage with the gift of healing. His sister Grace is a storm singer. Christopher flees from his fate as a secondary. He changes his name to Miles Singer and becomes a physician. Aeland and the neighboring nation of Laneer go to war. Miles joins the armed forces and later becomes a psychiatrist at a veterans’ hospital.

=== Plot summary ===
One night, Sir Tristan Hunter brings a terminally ill man, Nick Elliot, to the hospital. Nick claims to have been poisoned. A dying Nick alludes to witchcraft; Dr. Miles Singer is unable to save him. Tristan reveals himself as an Amaranthine, a fae being. The Amaranthine are guardians of the Solace, the realm of souls. People who die in Aeland are no longer moving to the Solace, and the Amaranthine are investigating.

At a gala for hospital benefactors, Miles reunites with his sister Grace, who believed him to be dead. Miles was intended to be Grace's secondary before he ran away from his family. Grace promises to keep Miles's survival a secret from their father and asks to reconnect. Meanwhile, Miles and Tristan become lovers.

Miles investigates an illness affecting several veterans. They believe themselves to be possessed; several have gone mad and killed their families. Miles believes that Nick's death is somehow connected.

Grace betrays Miles's confidence to their father, Christopher Sr. Grace binds Miles as her secondary against his will. Grace promises to change the Invisibles so that secondaries are more respected, but refuses to release her brother.

Meanwhile, Miles and Tristan learn that Nick was investigating the witch asylums. Miles also learns that the Laneeri are the cause of the veterans’ madness. The veterans are being possessed by the souls of dead Laneeri soldiers.

Miles, Grace, and Tristan visit an asylum. There, they learn that the imprisoned witches are being used in a profane ritual. The souls of all who die in Aeland are being used to make aether, which powers the nation's technology. This explains why they are no longer moving to the afterlife. Christopher Sr. ordered Nick’s death when he discovered too much.

Miles, Grace, and Tristan attempt to destroy the aether production. Christopher Sr. arrives to stop them. Grace releases Miles from the binding spell, allowing him to cure the possessed veterans and destroy the aether production. Miles is injured after a confrontation with his father.

Miles awakens to find that he is being cared for by an Amaranthine physician. The Amaranthines, Laneeri, and Aelanders are on the verge of conflict as a result of Miles’s discovery. Miles hopes to work to navigate the new political situation. Tristan proposes marriage to Miles, who accepts.

== Reception and awards ==
In 2020, Time magazine included Witchmark on its list of The 100 Best Fantasy Books of All Time.

Publishers Weekly called it "stellar", and praised the quality of Polk's exposition. AudioFile found it to be "charming", with "a rich setting" and "fully developed characters". In the New York Times, Amal el-Mohtar agreed that it was "thoroughly charming" as well as "deftly paced" and "accomplished and enjoyable", but noted that the female characters were "limited to their roles in the story", and stated that although the motivations of Miles' sister Grace were intended to be "opaque", they more often seemed "arbitrary".

Locus considered it a "particularly sterling" instance of fantasy in an Edwardian-equivalent setting, while observing that a "genre-savvy" audience may be disappointed in how long it takes Miles to conclude that the veterans' post-traumatic stress disorder was being exacerbated by magic. Tor.com lauded the worldbuilding and characterization, but faulted it for not resolving the conflict with Miles's colleague Dr. Crosby.

Awards
Year	Work	Award	Category	Result	Ref.
2018	Witchmark	Goodreads Choice Awards	Debut Author	Finalist	
2018	Witchmark	Nebula Award	Novel	Nominated	
2019	Witchmark	Aurora Award	Novel	Nominated	
2019	Witchmark	Lambda Literary Award	SF, Fantasy and Horror	Finalist	
2019	Witchmark	Locus Award	First Novel	Finalist	
2019	Witchmark	World Fantasy Award	Novel	Won	
2022	The Kingston Cycle	Hugo Award	Series	Finalist	

== Sequels ==
Witchmark is the first book of the three-volume Kingston Cycle. The second and third books in the series, Stormsong and Soulstar, were published in 2020 and 2021. The Kingston Cycle as a whole was a finalist for the 2022 Hugo Award for Best Series.
