= The End of All Things (novel) =

2015 novel by John Scalzi

- Author: John Scalzi
- Cover artist: John Harris
- Language: English
- Series: Old Man's War series
- Genre: Science fiction
- Publisher: Tor Books
- Publication date: 2015
- Publication place: United States
- Media type: Digital (E-book); Print (hardcover & paperback)
- Pages: 432
- ISBN: 978-0-7653-7607-7
- Preceded by: The Human Division
- Followed by: The Shattering Peace

The End of All Things is a science fiction novel by American writer John Scalzi, the sixth book set in the Old Man's War universe. The plot picks up where The Human Division left.

== Plot synopsis ==
The two major human governments, of the Earth and the Colonial Union, have parted ways after the destruction of Earth Station, and both have a poor relationship with the Conclave, a coalition of alien governments. Now the Colonial Union is running out of troops in the Colonial Defense Forces (CDF) without a new source of humans from Earth which would result in the human colonies being vulnerable to the alien species who have been waiting for the first sign of weakness, to drive humanity to ruin. And there is a group lurking in the shadows called the Equilibrium, which is intent on destroying both the Colonial Union and the Conclave. CDF Lieutenant Harry Wilson and the "B-Team" Colonial Union diplomats race against the clock to discover who is behind attacks on the Union and the alien races' Conclave, to seek peace with a suspicious, angry Earth, and keep humanity's Colonial Union intact, or else risk an extinction of the human race.

The first novella tells the story of its narrator Rafe Daquin, a software-engineer-turned-pilot who is part of the crew of a captured merchant vessel. The capture of the vessel at the hands of the Rraey, an alien species, turns out to be instigated by Colonial Union Deputy Secretary of State, Tyson Ocampo, who was on board the vessel ostensibly for a private vacation. Daquin, taken hostage by the Rraey while the rest of the crew is left to die, is subjected to a procedure that leaves him disembodied as a "brain in a box", with no option but to do the bidding of his as-yet-unknown captor. While being made to conduct piloting simulations by his captor, known only as Control, Daquin's software expertise allows him to discover a backdoor into the simulation where he is confined, and eventually he builds a shell around the simulation that is controlled by him. He requests a meeting with Ocampo; when this is granted he covertly copies all the files he can find on Ocampo's PDA which allows him to learn of the existence of an alliance of humans and alien species named the Equilibrium which is responsible for several actions against the Colonial Union and the Conclave including the destruction of Earth Station. Daquin then tricks Ocampo into visiting his vessel to bid farewell before he is sent on a kamikaze mission; he manages to escape his captors' control and render Ocampo unto the Colonial Union to be held accountable. The Colonial Union offers him a new body and asks him to represent them as a credible source while his body is being grown; he agrees to this request.

In the second novella, General Tarsem Gau and his assistant Hafte Sorvalh (narrator) deal with political crises in the Conclave that arise from the disclosure of Ocampo's records of the Colonial Union over several years. After the General is assassinated while speaking to the Conclave's legislature, Sorvalh reluctantly assumes his responsibilities and the title of Premier in order to preserve the unity of the Conclave. At the end, a letter from the General to Sorvalh reveals that he initiated his own assassination in order to ultimately strengthen the Conclave through a political upheaval that he knew would result. In the letter, the General says he wanted Sorvalh to be his successor but feared the reduction of his own stature and the weakening of the Conclave in a succession struggle, so he chose this route to give control to Sorvalh, whom he praises as a much cannier and more decisive politician. Taking her cue from the General's suggestion in the letter, Sorvalh destroys it, leaving no one any the wiser, and begins her duties as premier.

The third novella, narrated by Lieutenant Heather Lee (the former musician encountered in episode 8 of The Human Division), tells the story of the Colonial Union's efforts to clamp down on separatist movements on its colonies Franklin, Kyoto, Khartoum and Erie. Over the course of these missions, Lee grows disillusioned with the repeated need for her to suppress her fellow humans. After losing two soldiers under her command to a Rraey-assisted ambush in Khartoum, Lee decides to give up her life as a CDF soldier and desert for a new life in Erie, although she knows it cannot last.

In the fourth novella, narrated by Lieutenant Harry Wilson, Earth, the Colonial Union, and the Conclave are forced into acting together to prevent the destruction of all three entities by the clandestine disruptions of the Equilibrium. Through the diplomatic efforts of Ambassador Abumwe, Danielle Lowen and Wilson, an uneasy alliance is formed and the Equilibrium's efforts neutralised. In the aftermath, Abumwe is put in charge of building a new constitution with the Colonial Union's colonies to give them real representation and in turn obtain their co-operation in maintaining the CDF's strength through recruitment from the colonies.

== Publication history ==
The e-book was published serially at e-book retailers between 9–30 June 2015 as novella-length episodes. The episode titles with the release dates are:

- The Life of the Mind (9 June)
- This Hollow Union (16 June)
- Can Long Endure (23 June)
- To Stand or Fall (30 June)

On August 11, 2015, all of episodes were collected into a novel and a full-length audiobook was released. On June 16, 2016, the paperback version of the novel was released.

== Reception ==
Kirkus Reviews enjoyed that the book offers thrilling adventure scenes, politics, snarky commentary and food for thought. Publishers Weekly said the book would satisfy fans of the series by providing entertaining action scenes.

== Sequel ==
In 2025 John Scalzi returned to the series with the publication of The Shattering Peace, which takes place ten years after the events described in The End of All Things and twenty years after Old Man's War.
