= Even Though I Knew the End =

2022 novella by C.L. Polk

- Author: C.L. Polk
- Language: English
- Genre: Urban fantasy
- Set in: 1940s Chicago
- Publisher: Tordotcom
- Publication date: 8 November 2022
- Publication place: Canada
- Pages: 144 (hardcover)
- Awards: 2022 Nebula Award for Best Novella
- ISBN: 9781250849458

Even Though I Knew the End is a 2022 urban fantasy novella by Canadian speculative author C. L. Polk. It was first published by Tor Books. The novella received critical acclaim, including a win for the 2022 Nebula Award for Best Novella.

== Synopsis ==
The story is set in an alternate 1940s Chicago in which magic exists. Helen Brandt is asked to investigate a murder scene using her supernatural abilities. Helen has approximately three days to live, as her deal with the devil comes due. Despite this, she agrees to investigate. The victim has been killed by the White City Vampire, (Note: The narrative makes it clear that this nickname is a misnomer, as vampires do not exist in the world of the story. It refers solely to the bloody method of execution and staging of the bodies.) a serial killer who drains his victims’ blood and uses it to paint sigils at the scene. Helen is confronted by her estranged brother Theodore “Teddy” Brandt, a member of the Order of the Compass. Helen has been cast out of the Order for bargaining with the devil.

Helen meets up with her partner, Edith. Helen has not yet told Edith about her limited lifespan. While Edith plans to move to San Francisco, Helen knows that this is merely a dream. Helen then meets her client Marlowe, the woman who hired her to investigate the murder scene. Marlowe reveals herself as a demon and offers to return Helen’s soul in exchange for identifying the Vampire. Helen learns that the victims of the White City Vampire were all people who had made Faustian bargains in the past. The souls were promised to Marlowe, but another demon has stolen them; Helen is now involved in a demonic turf war.

Teddy and Helen meet up at the crime scene. A flashback reveals that Helen made her deal with the devil after Teddy was killed in a car accident. The deal allowed for Teddy’s resurrection at the cost of Helen’s soul, which would be collected after ten years.

That night, Edith returns home but speaks with a new voice. Helen learns that Edith is the willing host for Haraniel, a fallen angel hoping to restore their place in heaven. Together, Haraniel (in Edith’s body) and Helen go to the local zoo, where another murder has just occurred. They deduce that Matilda, a local girl, was possessed by the Vampire when she committed the crime. Helen and Haraniel visit Matilda in the asylum where she is being held. After interviewing her, they realize that the Vampire is actually an angel who uses hosts to murder their victims.

Haraniel reveals more about the history of angels. When the Watchers sired the Nephilim with humans, God recalled the angels to Heaven. Some returned and were forgiven. Others refused, and the way to Heaven was closed to them. They remain on Earth, hoping that bonding with human hosts will allow them to reach Heaven upon the host’s death. The Vampire hopes to use the power of the stolen human souls to summon Michael, who will open the way to Heaven once more.

Members of the Order kidnap Teddy, planning to use him as the Vampire’s final host. The Vampire is revealed to be Zashiel, an angel who is hosted by Edith’s priest. Zashiel has lost faith that human hosts can bring fallen angels to Heaven. He has decided to summon Michael and open the way himself. Helen summons Marlowe to fight Zashiel. She fulfills Marlowe’s bargain, gaining control of her soul once more. In the conflict, Zashiel kills Edith. Teddy kills Zashiel’s host, damning himself to hell.

Helen asks Marlowe to bring Edith back to life, once again selling her soul to the devil in ten years’ time. Edith returns to her body, leaving Haraniel in Heaven. Edith and Helen promise to spend the next ten years together.

== Reception and awards ==
Publishers Weekly commended Polk for their "focus on character development [that] makes every interaction matter [in] a layered exploration of love and power with genuine emotional stakes and a soaring, perfectly bittersweet payoff", and judged that "readers will wish they had more time to explore [the world of the story]".

Lightspeed called it "the queer supernatural detective noir everyone needs", lauding Elena's narrative voice as "catchy and funny in the way good urban fantasy protagonists are", and noting the "quick pacing". Strange Horizons observed parallels with Supernatural and praised the novella as a "straightforwardly terrific yarn" that "also explores questions of justice, queerness, and the arduous work of making moral choices within immoral structures", noting that Polk included "enough period detail to make her world feel real, historical, and populated with actual humans."

James Nicoll, while conceding that his own expectations in terms of worldbuilding may be unfair, nonetheless faulted Polk for depicting a setting which is identical to 1941 Chicago except for magic historically being real and publicly acknowledged; he also expressed his "pessimis[m] about Helen and [her lover] Edith's long-term prospects, what with their habit of not telling the other about stuff they think might upset their sweetheart", but overall found that "[i]t's well-written and moves fast", concluding that he "liked it a lot".

Year	Award	Category	Result	Ref
2022	Nebula Award	Novella	Won	
2023	Aurora Award	Novelette/Novella	Nominated	
2023	Hugo Award	Novella	Finalist	
2023	Ignyte Award	Novella	Finalist	
2023	Locus Award	Novella	Finalist	
2023	World Fantasy Award	Novella	Nominated	
