= Penric's Demon =

2015 novella by Lois McMaster Bujold

- Author: Lois McMaster Bujold
- Language: English
- Series: Penric and Desdemona
- Genre: Fantasy
- Publisher: Subterranean Press
- Publication date: 2015 (self-published); 6 July 2016 (Subterranean Press)
- Publication place: United States
- Pages: 184 (hardcover)
- ISBN: 9781596067691
- Followed by: Penric and the Shaman

Penric and the Demon is a 2015 novella by Lois McMaster Bujold. It is set in her World of the Five Gods, a universe shared with several of her novels.

== Plot ==
Lord Penric kin Jurald is a younger son of an impoverished noble family. On the day of his betrothal, he comes upon a riding accident. Learned Ruchia, an elderly temple divine and servant of the Bastard, bequeathes her powers to Penric as she dies. Penric sees strange lights and hears voices; he passes out.

The next day, he awakens and is told that he is now the host of a demon. He is sent to the city of Martensbridge to confer with the Bastard’s Order. Penric names the demon Desdemona. She contains the memories of her twelve previous hosts. At Martensbridge, Penric meets the Learned Tigney and an acolyte named Clee. He studies books in the temple library while the Bastard’s Order decides what to do about his situation. His connection with Desdemona grants him the ability to understand the languages spoken by her previous hosts, as well as the ability to use small magics.

Clee invites Penric to visit the castle ruled by his elder half-brother Rusillin. At dinner, Rusillin gives Penric a drugged cordial, which Desdemona immediately identifies. Penric feigns unconsciousness. Rusillin attempts to kill Penric, which would transfer Desdemona into his body. Penric reveals that he is awake; after a brief confrontation, he escapes into a lake. As he swims away, Desdemona sets Rusillin’s castle on fire.

Penric returns to the Bastard’s Order in Martensbridge to speak to Learned Tigney. He finds that Clee has arrived before him; Clee accuses Desdemona of possessing Penric and committing arson. Tigney summons Blessed Broylin, a saint of the Bastard who can destroy demons. Tigney believes that the demon is too dangerous to remain in the world, and asks Broylin to return Desdemona to her god. Penric prays to the Bastard on Desdemona's behalf, declaring her to be a "good demon." The Bastard agrees to let Desdemona remain. Clee is arrested. Penric swears fealty to the Bastard. The Order sends Penric to be educated at a university for Temple sorcerers.

== Publication history ==
The book was initially released in Amazon Kindle and audio formats. It was later published in hardback by Subterranean Press. In an interview with Clarkesworld, Bujold stated that she began writing Penric novellas "as à la carte original ebooks, with no contracts, deadlines, schedule, or set plan," which she described as "very freeing."

== Reception and awards ==
Publishers Weekly praised the book's "satisfying blend of strong characters and wry humor." The review called Penric "good-hearted, if somewhat naïve," highlighting the banter between him and Desdemona and the levity that it brings to the novella. Writing for Booklist, Lucy Lockley noted that "[f]ans of fantasy with clever, innocent underdog characters will root for Penric to beat the odds and hope to visit him and his demon again."

Kat Hooper of fantasyliterature.com gave the novella four stars out of a possible five. Hooper praised the audiobook, narrated by Grover Gardner. The review noted that the novella is less successful than Bujold's full-length novels set in the same world, stating that "the plot is simple and straightforward and, due to time constraints, the characters aren’t explored quite as deeply as we’d expect from Bujold." Nevertheless, Hooper praised the "imaginative world, interesting characters, exciting plot, lovely but succinct prose, and wry sense of humor."

Penric's Demon was a finalist for the 2016 Hugo Award for Best Novella and Locus Award for Best Novella.
