= Old Man's War series =

Military sci-fi novels by John Scalzi (pub. 2005–2015)

Old Man's War
- Author: John Scalzi
- Country: United States
- Language: English
- Genre: Science fiction
- Publisher: Tor Books
- No. of books: 7
- Website: Preview site

The Old Man's War series is a series of science fiction novels by John Scalzi. The first book in the series, Old Man's War, was first published in 2005 by Tor Books, and was nominated for the Hugo Award for Best Novel in 2006. In 2026 it won the Hugo Award for Best Series.

== Television series adaptation ==
In August 2014 SyFy announced that they were working on developing a TV series based on the Old Man's War series, to be called Ghost Brigades, with Wolfgang Petersen overseeing development.

In December 2017, it was announced that Netflix had acquired Old Man's War and would develop it as an original film. As of January 2024, Netflix was "slowly but surely moving along" on the adaptation.

== Works ==
#	Title	Pages	Word count	Date	Release	ISBN
1	Old Man's War	320	90,566	January 2005	Tor Books	ISBN 0-7653-0940-8
	Questions for a Soldier	28	5,412	December 2005	Subterranean Press chapbook	ISBN 1-59606-048-4
2	The Ghost Brigades	320	103,335	February 2006	Tor Books	ISBN 0-7653-1502-5
	The Sagan Diary	104	12,700	February 2007	Subterranean Press; April 2008, Audible.com	ISBN 978-1-59606-103-3
3	The Last Colony	320	92,059	April 2007	Tor Books	ISBN 0-7653-1697-8
	After the Coup		7,083	July 2008	Tor.com eBook	ASIN B003V4B4PM
4	Zoe's Tale	336	90,000	August 2008	Tor Books	ISBN 0-7653-1698-6
5	The Human Division	432	130,000	May 2013	Tor Books	ISBN 978-0-7653-3351-3
	Hafte Sorvalh Eats a Churro and Speaks to the Youth of Today			May 2013	Tor Books	
6	The End of All Things	384	99,000	August 2015	Tor Books	ISBN 978-0-7653-7607-7
7	The Shattering Peace	288		September 2025	Tor Books	ISBN 978-0-7653-8919-0
	Total	2,112	630,155			
