= World of the Five Gods =

Series of fantasy novels by Lois McMaster Bujold

World of the Five Gods is a fantasy series by American writer Lois McMaster Bujold. It was awarded the Hugo Award for Best Series in 2018. It consists of four novels and eleven novellas, with six of the novellas included in the award. Three novels and two of the novellas were nominees for or winners of major awards.

The World of the Five Gods was informally called "the Chalion series" at first, but the name was abandoned as the series expanded.

== Overview ==
The World of the Five Gods series explores an alternate reality on a world analogous to Earth, influenced by conflicts between the old shamanic religion, the new dominant Quintarian religion, and the heretical Quadrene faith, mirroring the spread of Christianity in pagan lands and the later clashes between Catholicism and Islam. Quintarians acknowledge five gods—the Father, Mother, Daughter, Son, and Bastard—while Quadrenes deny the Bastard, claiming he is a demon rather than a god. In the series, the various gods intercede in events, but must do so by influencing people through dreams and visitations as they have no power to act directly on the world. As explained by a character in The Hallowed Hunt, "The gods have no hands in this world but ours. If we fail Them, where then can They turn?"

Bujold has stated that she intends to write a novel that focuses on each god. The Hallowed Hunt features the Son, The Curse of Chalion the Daughter, and Paladin of Souls the Bastard. The Penric novellas predominantly focus on the Bastard. The first three Penric novellas were published in January 2020 by Baen Books in a single volume, under the title Penric's Progress.

The works in the series share a world and theology, rather than related characters, in contrast to Bujold's Vorkosigan Saga.

The Curse of Chalion and Paladin of Souls are set in the landlocked medieval kingdom of Chalion, which is a fictional equivalent of Castile and León during the time of the Reconquista, or Spanish Reconquest. Chalion and its neighboring countries are on the Ibran Peninsula, a reversed version of the Iberian Peninsula. The Hallowed Hunt is set in the Weald, an area roughly similar to medieval Germany, southwest of the Ibran Peninsula. In the novellas, Penric begins in the Cantons, north of the Weald. His adventures take him to Adria, Orbas, and Cedonia, northwest of the Cantons and the Weald, as well as a disputed island off the coast of Adria.

== Internal timeline ==
Bujold's reading-order guide states that the works in the World of the Five Gods can be read in any order, although Paladin of Souls has spoilers for The Curse of Chalion. Using the internal chronology of the stories, the events in the works take place in this order:

1. The Hallowed Hunt
2. Penric's Demon, approximately 150 years after The Hallowed Hunt
3. Penric and the Shaman
4. Penric's Fox
5. Testimony of Mute Things
6. Masquerade in Lodi
7. Penric's Mission
8. Mira's Last Dance
9. The Prisoner of Limnos
10. The Orphans of Raspay
11. The Physicians of Vilnoc
12. The Assassins of Thasalon
13. Knot of Shadows
14. Demon Daughter
15. Penric and the Bandit
16. The Adventures of the Demonic Ox
17. Darksight Dare
18. The Curse of Chalion, approximately 100 years after the Penric novellas
19. Paladin of Souls, a few years after The Curse of Chalion

== Awards ==
- The Curse of Chalion (2001) winner of Mythopoeic Fantasy Award for Adult Literature, nominee for Hugo Award, Locus Fantasy Award, and World Fantasy Award, 2002
- Paladin of Souls (2003) winner of Hugo Award, Nebula Award, and Locus Fantasy Awards, 2004
- The Hallowed Hunt (2005) nominee for Locus Fantasy Award, 2006
- Penric's Demon (2015) (novella) nominee for Hugo Award, 2016
- Penric and the Shaman (2016) (novella) nominee for Hugo Award, 2017
- The series, consisting of three novels and six novellas at the time, won the Hugo Award for Best Series in 2018.

== See also ==
- List of works by Lois McMaster Bujold
