= The Ghost Brigades =

2006 novel by John Scalzi

- Cover of first edition (hardcover)
- Author: John Scalzi
- Language: English
- Series: Old Man's War series
- Genre: Science fiction
- Publisher: Tor Books
- Publication date: 2006
- Publication place: United States
- Media type: Print (Hardcover)
- Pages: 384
- ISBN: 9780765354068
- Preceded by: Old Man's War
- Followed by: The Last Colony

The Ghost Brigades is a science fiction novel by American writer John Scalzi, the second book set in his Old Man's War universe. In contrast to the first part of the series, it is written multiperspectively as a subjective third-person narrative with Jared Dirac being the main point of view character.

== Plot summary ==
The Colonial Defense Forces (CDF) learn by torture from a captured Rraey scientist that one of their top consciousness transfer scientists, Charles Boutin, has turned traitor and sparked an unprecedented alliance between three other species, the Rraey, the Enishan and the Obin, to wipe out humanity. While investigating Boutin's clumsy attempt to fake his own death, the CDF discovers that Boutin had successfully stored a copy of his consciousness in a computer. The colonial Special Forces, nicknamed "The Ghost Brigades," create a CDF soldier body with Boutin's DNA, retrieved from his cloned decoy corpse, trying to implant the copy of Boutin's consciousness into the new brain, in order to learn where Boutin has escaped to and what his intentions really are. After the attempt seemingly fails, the soldier named Jared Dirac (after Paul Dirac) becomes a private in the Special Forces and is assigned to a platoon commanded by Jane Sagan. On the off chance that Boutin's consciousness does emerge, Sagan and her superiors are determined to keep an eye on Jared. Time passes and an experience that reminds Dirac of Boutin's assumed dead daughter Zoë leads Boutin's consciousness to emerge. Jared slowly becomes more and more like Boutin while losing his own personality traits, but retains his individuality and his strong moral opposition to Boutin's philosophy and actions. When the extent of Boutin's treachery becomes known, it's clear there will be some difficult choices required to stop Boutin's alliance with the three alien races.

A mission to the moon where Boutin is helping the Obin build their consciousness transfer technology, led by Sagan and Dirac, is catastrophically compromised by Boutin's use of a backdoor to disable the soldiers' BrainPals and render many of them catatonic. Dirac is interrogated by Boutin, who decides to transfer his own consciousness into Dirac's body in an attempt to infiltrate and destroy the Colonial Union using a BrainPal computer virus. Dirac learns that the Obin probably have been given intelligence by the Consu, but without any self awareness, which they now crave and Boutin promised to give them, and that Zoë is still alive, and can send that information to Sagan, before the transfer succeeds, ending Dirac's consciousness. Dirac is able to posthumously neutralize Boutin by leaving a Trojan horse in a BrainPal message, oxidizing his body's smart blood and killing him. Boutin's daughter Zoë is retrieved by the survivors of the mission, including Sagan. At the end of the book, Sagan is offered retirement in order to keep her from disclosing sensitive information she received from Boutin; she accepts and retires with her future husband John Perry, adopting Zoë. The Obin proceed to sign a treaty with the CDF that ends hostilities.

== Universe ==
All of the colonial defense forces are given genetically altered bodies with all sorts of upgrades, with the Special Forces getting the most. These soldiers are born into these bodies, and only through their BrainPal do they know what to do. This universe is a hostile place and these upgrades are the bare minimum the CDF can give them just to hold their own. Travel in the universe is done by skip drive, an instantaneous means of transportation.

== Alien species ==
The Ghost Brigades introduces the following races:

- Eneshan: Human-sized insectoid race descended from a termite-like creature. Nominally allies with the CDF. Society is hierarchical, matriarchal and highly tribal, with much inter-tribal conflict.
- Obin: Evolved on the moon of a gas giant, they were given intelligence but not individual consciousness by another alien species, the Consu. The Obin are described as a hermaphroditic species that resemble a cross between a spider and a giraffe. They generally do not interact with other races, except to attack; they are brutal, merciless, and unrelenting when they do.
- Gameran: These are actually a subspecies of humans, designed by the CDF to live natively in space. They appear similar to large rock turtles and can hide easily among asteroids, planetary rings, and other bodies or satellites. They also have the first generation of BrainPal that is entirely organic.

== Returning characters ==
Three of the characters from Old Man's War make an appearance in The Ghost Brigades:

- Jane Sagan, a member of the Special Forces (unofficially called the Ghost Brigades) of the CDF, whose body was cloned from the DNA of John Perry's deceased wife
- Harry Wilson, a soldier of the CDF, now working as a scientist
- John Perry (only mentioned), the main character of Old Man's War

== Reception and awards ==
Awards and honors
Year	Award	Category	Result	Ref.
2007	Prometheus Award	—	Finalist	
2009	Seiun Award	Translated Long Form	Finalist	
