= Zoe's Tale =

2008 novel by John Scalzi

- Cover of first edition (hardcover)
- Author: John Scalzi
- Cover artist: John Harris
- Language: English
- Series: Old Man's War series
- Genre: Science fiction
- Published: 2008 (Tor Books)
- Publication place: United States
- Media type: Print (Hardcover)
- Pages: 366
- ISBN: 978-0-7653-1698-1
- Preceded by: The Last Colony
- Followed by: The Human Division

Zoe's Tale is a science fiction novel by American writer John Scalzi. It is the fourth full-length book in the Old Man's War universe. Zoe's Tale is a parallel retelling of Scalzi's third Old Man's War novel, The Last Colony, written as a first-person narrative from the viewpoint of Zoë Boutin Perry. It follows up on several plot points that were underrepresented in the original novel.

== Plot synopsis ==
Zoë is the 16-year-old adopted daughter of John Perry and Jane Sagan, two former-soldiers-turned-colonists who were the main characters of Scalzi's first book, Old Man's War, and its sequel. Her biological father, Charles Boutin, created a device capable of giving consciousness to a race of creatures, called the Obin, who are otherwise intelligent but not conscious. The Obin worshipped him, but he was killed for being a traitor to humankind and wanting to overthrow the Colonial Union. Since Boutin gave consciousness to the Obin, his daughter Zoë became a demigod to them. As such, she is accompanied at all times by a pair of Obin bodyguards, Hickory and Dickory, who also relay all their experiences and feelings back to the rest of the Obin.

After John and Jane are assigned to manage the colony of Roanoke—the first human colony to be settled by colonists from other colonies rather than directly from Earth—Zoë befriends Gretchen en route, and the two soon build romantic relationships with Enzo and Magdy, respectively. On Roanoke, foolhardy Magdy leads the four into peril against what later come to be known as Roanoke's indigenous werewolves. Hickory and Dickory train Zoë to defend herself against these and other alien threats. Later, after a colonist is killed by the werewolves, Magdy and Enzo are among those who head into the woods for revenge. Zoë, Gretchen, Hickory, and Dickory manage to find Enzo and Magdy, who are cornered by the werewolves, without alerting them, but Zoë reveals herself to defuse the situation and the werewolf threat by asserting dominance over Magdy and punishing him, then allowing an injured werewolf to injure Magdy in turn.

When General Tarsem Gau's Conclave fleet finds Roanoke to demand that it join the Conclave or be destroyed, Zoë witnesses the exchange (a central plot point in the Last Colony) and the Conclave's fleet's destruction from afar. A subsequent counter-attack by another faction results in the death of Enzo and his family. When General Szilard, commander of the Special Forces, reveals to John and Jane, and they to Zoë, that the Colonial Union has concealed the fact that General Gau has not destroyed colonies' populations except when they are completely intransigent about joining the Conclave or following its edicts by leaving, John sends Zoë as a credible and costly signal to General Gau to report Szilard's intelligence that Gau may be assassinated by a close ally. Gau is not surprised at this news, as the Conclave has factionalized since the fleet's failure at Roanoke, but recognizes the import of John's risking of Zoë. Gau and Zoë playact some political drama to out the traitor in Gau's circle, but only the unexpected arrival of a Consu fleet saves them from the traitors' backup plan.

The Consu were intrigued by Zoë's demand that the Obin arrange for her to meet them, as she must have known that they would sacrifice hundreds of themselves to satisfy her. However, she did not know what her request would cost. The Consu offer to give her technology that will save Roanoke from any Conclave, non-Conclave alien, or Colonial Union attack if she will knowingly set one hundred Obin against one hundred Consu criminals for the prize in a ritualised fight. Zoë will not do so knowingly, nor does she accept the Consu's further offer to give her the technology without a contest if she asks the hundred Obin to commit suicide for her. Instead, she tells the Obin that she's tired of carrying the weight of her divinity with them and says they owe her nothing. The Obin volunteer anyway and win the prize. The Consu sapping field then defends Roanoke from the Conclave faction's attack.

John and Jane and Zoë leave Roanoke at Gau's invitation to avoid further trouble with the Colonial Union, whose plan to sacrifice Roanoke to boost military recruitment stands revealed.

== Writing Process ==
John Scalzi described Zoe's Tale as "the most difficult book [he] had to write", one reason being that he had to take up the viewpoint of a sixteen year old girl, who is coming of age. The novel being a retelling of the events narrated in The Last Colony, he still wanted to avoid telling the same story, which is why he reduced recycling scenes from the previous part to an absolute minimum. As the book has been partly intended as young adult fiction, Scalzi's goal was to make it able to stand alone and to appeal to a teenage audience as well.

== Reception ==
The novel received favourable reviews. Marc Chitty wrote on SFFWorld that Scalzi once again delivered an excellent story with great characters. Publishers Weekly predicted that its engaging character development and Scalzi's sharp ear for dialogue would draw in new readers.

Year	Award	Category	Result	Ref.
2008	Romantic Times Reviewer's Choice Award	Science Fiction Novel	Finalist	
2009	Andre Norton Award	—	Finalist	
2009	Hugo Award	Novel	Finalist	
2009	Locus Award	Young Adult Book	Finalist	

== Trivia ==
A ritual duel between Consu criminals and in that case Special Forces soldiers was first described in Old Man's War with the humans winning the contest.
