= The Last Colony =

2007 novel by John Scalzi

- Cover of first edition (hardcover)
- Author: John Scalzi
- Language: English
- Series: Old Man's War series
- Genre: Science fiction
- Publisher: Tor Books
- Publication date: April 17, 2007
- Publication place: United States
- Media type: Print (Hardcover)
- Pages: 336
- ISBN: 978-0-7653-1697-4
- Preceded by: The Ghost Brigades
- Followed by: Zoe's Tale

The Last Colony is a science fiction novel by American writer John Scalzi, the third set in his Old Man's War universe. It was a finalist for a 2008 Hugo Award in the Best Novel category. Like the first part of the series, it is a first-person narrative told by John Perry, the main character of Old Man's War.

== Plot synopsis ==
John Perry and Jane Sagan, the former Ghost Brigade clone of Perry's dead wife, who in the meantime settled on the planet Huckleberry, are offered positions as leaders of the new colony of Roanoke, which will comprise a first wave of human settlers from the first ten established extraterrestrial human colonies. After deliberating, they decide to accept and travel with Zoë to the new colony. In tow are Zoë's Obin protectors, named Hickory and Dickory, who view her with almost religious awe due to her father's success in giving the Obin consciousness using a brain implant.

Upon arriving, the colonists quickly realize they are not at the planet originally assigned to them. They are approached by a Gameran member of the Special Forces of the Colonial Defence Forces (CDF), adapted to live in space, who had attached himself to the exterior of their craft. He informs them they have no option but to land and start colonising anyway. The ship has been irreparably sabotaged by the CDF to prevent the craft from leaving orbit, and all the colonists as well as the ship's crew are considered quarantined from the rest of the Colonial Union against their will. The Conclave, an alliance of more than 400 alien species, that wants to stop humanity's expansion, was allegedly aware of the original position of Roanoke, and therefore was waiting to annihilate them. To stress their point, he shows the colonists some video footage of a Whaidian colony being destroyed by the Conclave. He further tells them that to isolate them fully, they are forbidden from using any advanced technology based on wireless communication, because it could be traced by the enemy. This is offset by the presence of the Mennonites, an Amish-like group of colonists who are familiar with the large amount of basic machinery that the CDF had given the colonists. The deserted spaceship is ultimately destroyed by crashing into the surface of the planet. Jane Sagan finds out that her body has been secretly upgraded with Special Forces abilities against her will by General Szilard, commander of the Special Forces.

The colony proceeds with surprisingly little initial difficulty. Several colonists are killed by stone-age-level werewolf-like creatures who view them as potential prey, but otherwise the humans begin to settle into the colony. Trying to find out if the Colonial Union withheld critical information about Roanoke, they also reconstruct the unedited video of the Conclave's attack on the Whaidian colony. It becomes clear that the Conclave was hoping not having to erase the settlement, and that their aim is multiracial colonisation of planets. After a certain length of time, the colonists are again visited by Special Forces, who inform them that the plan has partially succeeded, and the initial restrictions on technology have been lifted. The Union attempted to destabilize the Conclave by making them appear incompetent, due to their inability to find a single colony despite a year's worth of searching.

After a brief interlude when their location is leaked to the Conclave, they are visited by the Conclave fleet, consisting of a single ship from every member race of the Conclave. The Conclave leader, General Tarsem Gau, who also appeared in the video, begs John to either give up the colony or secede from the Union and join the Conclave. John refuses, and asks General Gau to surrender. Baffled, the General tells John to make his peace, and orders the Conclave fleet to open fire. Almost immediately, the entire fleet is annihilated. Special Forces members, during the prior year, had methodically tracked down every ship in the Conclave fleet and attached a remotely triggered antimatter bomb to the hull. The Gamaran officer who accompanied the Roanoke colonists then waited for every Conclave ship to arrive before detonating the mines, sparing the leader's craft. Gau understands that John secretly tried to warn him. The event shatters the Conclave into multiple factions, several of which swear vengeance on the Union. Jane staves off an attempted attack on the planet from one faction, remotely controlling the colony's defense lasers, although some people are killed.

After the attack, John is ordered to Phoenix Station and faces an inquiry for misconduct by almost ruining the plan to destroy the enemy fleet when asking General Gau to surrender. He is eventually absolved, and after speaking with General Szilard, returns to Roanoke. The General has told him that he influenced the verdict and that Roanoke is a sacrificial pawn. If the Roanoke colony is destroyed, enlistment in the CDF will spike using the destruction of the colony as a rally cry, allowing for a more aggressive campaign against the other alien races. This however will cause humanity's eventual extinction through a war of attrition. General Szilard wants to prevent that. He also informs John of a planned assassination attempt on General Gau by a close ally.

John advises the colonists to declare Roanoke independent, but is overruled. He can avert the murder of General Gau by sending Zoë as an emissary, which consolidates Gau's role as leader, abdicates the leadership of Roanoke, because his action represents an act of treason towards the Colonial Union, and joins the Conclave, after being awarded a ship by them as his sovereign domain, with help from the Obin. Together with other members of the Conclave, he visits Earth, which is kept isolated from the rest of the galaxy by the Colonial Union and where he is actually forbidden to return, to reveal what has been befalling the rest of the universe and to update them on the Conclave's level of technology.

The Colonial Union is thrown into disarray, with enlistment plummeting and potential colonists demurring, but the end of the book suggests that bringing Earth into the Union properly will allow for more diplomatic solutions and cooperation between species.

== Alien species ==
The Last Colony introduces several new races to the Old Man's War universe, among them the Arrisian, the Bhav, the Dtrutz, the Nouri, and the Qui.

== Trivia ==
The names of the planet Roanoke and Croatoan for its first village are a reference to the historic Lost Colony of Roanoke, the first permanent English settlement in North America.

== Reception and awards ==
Year	Award	Category	Result	Ref.
2008	Hugo Award	Novel	Finalist	
2010	Seiun Award	Translated Novel	Won	
