= C. L. Polk =

Canadian author of fantasy fiction

- Born: 1969 (age 56–57); New Westminster, British Columbia, Canada
- Occupation: Author
- Writing career
- Genre: Fantasy fiction
- Notable works: Witchmark; Even Though I Knew the End
- Notable awards: World Fantasy Award; Nebula Award
- Website: clpolk.com

C. L. Polk (born 1969) is a Canadian author of fantasy fiction, known for their debut novel Witchmark which won the World Fantasy Award in 2019. Polk's 2022 novella Even Though I Knew the End won the Nebula Award for Best Novella, and several of their other works have received nominations for speculative fiction awards.

== Early life and career ==
Polk was born in 1969 in New Westminster, British Columbia and grew up in Surrey and Edmonton. They began writing in their thirties, publishing short fiction in magazines such as Abyss & Apex in the early 2000s. Polk was influenced by the works of fantasy author Tanith Lee, in particular the Tales from the Flat Earth, the historical mystery and fantasy novels of Barbara Hambly, and the Valdemar novels by Mercedes Lackey.

Polk's first novel Witchmark was the first entry in the Kingston Cycle. It was written in 2014 and published in 2018. Witchmark won the World Fantasy Award for Best Novel, and received nominations for several awards including the Nebula and Locus Awards. In 2019, Polk was listed by the CBC as one of "19 Canadian writers to watch".

Stormsong, the sequel to Witchmark, was listed by CBC Books as among the Canadian fiction to watch for in 2020. The third and concluding book of the series, Soulstar, was published in 2021. Other works by Polk include a historical fantasy set in Regency era England, The Midnight Bargain, which was nominated for several speculative fiction prizes and was a contender in the 2021 edition of Canada Reads.

Even Though I Knew the End, a period novella set in early 1900s Chicago about a damned woman fighting for a chance to be with the woman she loves, was nominated for multiple major awards and won the Nebula Award. Polk expressed surprise at the flood of nominations, saying that they didn't think it was "an award book."

== Personal life ==
Polk is non-binary and has referred to their gender as a "lava lamp."

As of 2020, Polk resides in Calgary, Alberta. In 2023, Polk underwent treatment with ketamine and blogged about their experience. Their intent was to manage Complex Post Traumatic Stress Disorder impacting their life and writing career. Polk continues to focus on fantasy with queer, romantic, and adventurous themes.

== Awards ==
Awards
Pub. year	Work	Award	Category	Result	Ref.
2018	Witchmark	Aurora Award	Novel, 2019	Nominated	
2018	Witchmark	Goodreads Choice Awards	Debut Author, 2018	Finalist	
2018	Witchmark	Lambda Literary Award	SF, Fantasy and Horror, 2019	Finalist	
2018	Witchmark	Locus Award	First Novel, 2019	Finalist	
2018	Witchmark	Nebula Award	Novel, 2018	Shortlisted	
2018	Witchmark	World Fantasy Award	Novel, 2019	Won	
2020	The Midnight Bargain	Ignyte Award	Adult Novel, 2021	Finalist	
2020	The Midnight Bargain	Locus Award	Fantasy Novel, 2021	Finalist	
2020	The Midnight Bargain	Nebula Award	Novel, 2020	Nominated	
2020	The Midnight Bargain	World Fantasy Award	Novel, 2021	Nominated	
2021	"The Music of the Siphorophenes"	Ignyte Award	Novelette, 2022	Finalist	
2021	Soulstar	Aurora Award	Novel, 2022	Nominated	
2021	Soulstar	Locus Award	Fantasy Novel, 2022	Finalist	
2022	Even Though I Knew the End	Aurora Award	Novelette/Novella, 2023	Nominated	
2022	Even Though I Knew the End	Hugo Award	Novella, 2023	Finalist	
2022	Even Though I Knew the End	Ignyte Award	Novella, 2023	Finalist	
2022	Even Though I Knew the End	Locus Award	Novella, 2023	Finalist	
2022	Even Though I Knew the End	Nebula Award	Novella, 2022	Won	
2022	Even Though I Knew the End	World Fantasy Award	Novella, 2023	Nominated	
2022	The Kingston Cycle	Hugo Award	Series	Finalist	
2023	"Ivy, Angelica, Bay"	Hugo Award	Novelette, 2024	Finalist	
2023	"Ivy, Angelica, Bay"	Ignyte Award	Novelette, 2024	Finalist	

== Bibliography ==
=== The Kingston Cycle ===
- Witchmark (paperback ed.). Tor.com. 2018. pp. 1–318. ISBN 9781250162687.
- Stormsong (paperback ed.). Tor.com. 2020. pp. 1–346. ISBN 9780765398994.
- Soulstar (paperback ed.). Tor.com. 2021. pp. 1–304. ISBN 9781250203571.

=== Other novels and novellas ===
- The Midnight Bargain (hardcover ed.). Erewhon Books. 2020. pp. 1–384. ISBN 9781645660071.
- Even Though I Knew the End (hardcover 1st ed.). Tor.com. 2022. pp. 1–144. ISBN 9781250849458.

=== Short fiction ===
Year	Title	Scope	Publication	Ref
2003	"Le Bel Homme Sans Merci"		"Le Bel Homme Sans Merci". Abyss & Apex. July–August 2003. Archived from the original on August 10, 2022.	
2005	"Bright Wings and Wax"		"Bright Wings and Wax". Ideomancer. 4 (1). March 2005.	
2007	"Kether Station"		"Kether Station". Jim Baen's Universe. 2 (3). October 2007.	
2020	"St. Valentine, St. Abigail, St. Brigid"		Chen, Ruoxi, ed. (February 5, 2020). "St. Valentine, St. Abigail, St. Brigid". Tor.com.	
2021	"The Music of the Siphorophenes"	Novelette	"The Music of the Siphorophenes". F&SF. 140 (3 & 4). March–April 2021.	
2023	"Ivy, Angelica, Bay"	Novelette	"Ivy, Angelica, Bay". Reactor. December 8, 2023.	
