= Hugo Award for Best Series =

Annual awards for science fiction or fantasy

- Awarded for: The best science fiction or fantasy series of at least 3 volumes and 240,000 words, with a work published in the prior calendar year
- Country: United States
- Presented by: World Science Fiction Society
- First award: 2017
- Most recent winner: John Scalzi (Old Man's War)
- Website: Official website

The Hugo Award for Best Series is one of the Hugo Awards given each year for science fiction or fantasy stories published in or translated into English during the previous calendar year. The award is available for series of science fiction or fantasy stories consisting of at least 3 published works totaling at least 240,000 words, with at least one work released or translated into English during the previous calendar year. A losing finalist becomes eligible again with the publication of at least two new works totaling at least 240,000 words.

The Hugo Award for Best Series has been awarded annually since 2017. It was first presented in that year as a one-time special Hugo Award in advance of a vote to make it a permanent category, and was ratified as such by members of the World Science Fiction Society that year. An earlier series award was given to Isaac Asimov for his Foundation series in 1966 for Best All-Time Series. In addition to the regular Hugo Awards, between 1996 and 2025 Retrospective Hugo Awards or "Retro-Hugos" were available for works published 50, 75, or 100 years prior. Retro-Hugos could only be awarded for years after 1939 in which no awards were originally given. A Retro-Hugo Award was given for the series category once, in 2020, representing what could have been awarded in 1945.

Hugo Award nominees and winners are chosen by supporting or attending members of the annual World Science Fiction Convention, or Worldcon, and the presentation evening constitutes its central event. The selection process is defined in the World Science Fiction Society Constitution as instant-runoff voting with six finalists. The series on the ballot are the six most-nominated by members that year, with no limit on the number of series that can be nominated. Initial nominations of five series each are made by members in January through March, while voting on the ballot of six finalists is performed roughly in April through July, subject to change depending on when that year's Worldcon is held. Worldcons are generally held near the start of September, and are held in a different city around the world each year.

In the 11 nomination years, 54 series by 46 authors have been finalists, including co-authors and Retro-Hugos. Lois McMaster Bujold is the only author to win twice, for the Vorkosigan Saga and World of the Five Gods series. 13 other authors have received multiple final ballot nominations, with Seanan McGuire and Adrian Tchaikovsky nominated for three different series; Robert Jackson Bennett, Max Gladstone, Naomi Novik, John Scalzi, Charles Stross, and Martha Wells being nominated for two; and Ben Aaronovitch, Aliette de Bodard, Brandon Sanderson, and James S. A. Corey (a pen-name for Daniel Abraham and Ty Franck) nominated multiple times for the same series. McGuire has the most nominations overall with ten, winning once.

== Winners and finalists ==
In the following table, the years correspond to the date of the ceremony, rather than when any work in the series was published. Entries with a yellow background have won the award; those with a grey background are the other finalists.

* Winners and joint winners

Winners and finalists
Year	Author	Series	Publisher(s)	Ref.
2017	Lois McMaster Bujold*	The Vorkosigan Saga	Baen Books	
2017	Max Gladstone	The Craft Sequence	Tor Books	
2017	James S. A. Corey (pen name of Daniel Abraham and Ty Franck)	The Expanse	Orbit Books	
2017	Seanan McGuire	The October Daye series	DAW Books / Corsair Books	
2017	Ben Aaronovitch	The Peter Grant / Rivers of London series	Victor Gollancz Ltd / Del Rey Books / DAW Books / Subterranean Press	
2017	Naomi Novik	The Temeraire series	Del Rey Books / Harper Voyager UK	
2018	Lois McMaster Bujold*	World of the Five Gods	Harper Voyager / Spectrum Literary Agency	
2018	Martha Wells	The Books of the Raksura	Night Shade Books	
2018	Robert Jackson Bennett	The Divine Cities	Broadway Books	
2018	Seanan McGuire	InCryptid	DAW Books	
2018	Marie Brennan	The Memoirs of Lady Trent	Tor Books / Titan Books	
2018	Brandon Sanderson	The Stormlight Archive	Tor Books / Victor Gollancz Ltd	
2019	Becky Chambers*	Wayfarers	Hodder & Stoughton / Harper Voyager	
2019	Malka Older	The Centenal Cycle	Tor.com Publishing	
2019	Charles Stross	The Laundry Files	Tor.com Publishing / Orbit Books	
2019	Yoon Ha Lee	Machineries of Empire	Solaris Books	
2019	Seanan McGuire	The October Daye series	DAW Books	
2019	Aliette de Bodard	The Universe of Xuya	Subterranean Press	
2020	James S. A. Corey (pen name of Daniel Abraham and Ty Franck)*	The Expanse	Orbit Books	
2020	Seanan McGuire	InCryptid	DAW Books	
2020	Ian McDonald	Luna	Tor Books / Victor Gollancz Ltd	
2020	Emma Newman	Planetfall series	Ace Books / Victor Gollancz Ltd	
2020	Katherine Arden	Winternight Trilogy	Del Rey Books	
2020	Tade Thompson	The Wormwood Trilogy	Orbit Books	
2021	Martha Wells*	The Murderbot Diaries	Tor.com Publishing	
2021	S. A. Chakraborty	The Daevabad Trilogy	Harper Voyager	
2021	John Scalzi	The Interdependency	Tor Books	
2021	Mary Robinette Kowal	The Lady Astronaut Universe	Tor Books / Audible / The Magazine of Fantasy & Science Fiction	
2021	Seanan McGuire	The October Daye series	DAW Books	
2021	R. F. Kuang	The Poppy War	Harper Voyager	
2022	Seanan McGuire*	Wayward Children	Tordotcom Publishing	
2022	Fonda Lee	The Green Bone Saga	Orbit Books	
2022	C. L. Polk	The Kingston Cycle	Tordotcom Publishing	
2022	Charles Stross	The Merchant Princes	Macmillan Publishers	
2022	Ada Palmer	Terra Ignota	Tor Books	
2022	T. Kingfisher	The World of the White Rat	Argyll Productions	
2023	Adrian Tchaikovsky* (Note: Tchaikovsky has disavowed this win due to the subsequent ballot controversy.)	Children of Time series	Pan Macmillan/Orbit Books	
2023	Robert Jackson Bennett	The Founders Trilogy	Del Rey Books	
2023	Tamsyn Muir	The Locked Tomb	Tordotcom	
2023	Seanan McGuire	October Daye	DAW Books	
2023	Ben Aaronovitch	Rivers of London	Orion Publishing Group	
2023	Naomi Novik	The Scholomance	Del Rey Books	
2024	Ann Leckie*	Imperial Radch	Orbit Books	
2024	Adrian Tchaikovsky	The Final Architecture	Tordotcom / Orbit Books	
2024	Freya Marske	The Last Binding	Tordotcom / Tor Books	
2024	Charles Stross	The Laundry Files	Tordotcom / Orbit Books	
2024	Seanan McGuire	October Daye	DAW Books	
2024	Aliette de Bodard	The Universe of Xuya	Victor Gollancz Ltd / JABberwocky Literary Agency / Subterranean Press / Uncanny Magazine / et al.)	
2025	Rebecca Roanhorse*	Between Earth and Sky	Saga Press	
2025	Tasha Suri	The Burning Kingdoms	Tordotcom / Orbit Books	
2025	Seanan McGuire	InCryptid	DAW Books	
2025	Jeff VanderMeer	Southern Reach	Farrar, Straus and Giroux	
2025	Brandon Sanderson	The Stormlight Archive	Tor Books	
2025	Adrian Tchaikovsky	The Tyrant Philosophers	Ad Astra	
2026	John Scalzi*	Old Man's War	Tor Books	
2026	Heather Fawcett	Emily Wilde	Del Rey Books / Orbit Books	
2026	Seanan McGuire	October Daye	Tordotcom / DAW Books	
2026	Katherine Addison	The Chronicles of Osreth	Tor Books / Subterranean Press	
2026	Max Gladstone	The Craft Wars	Tordotcom	
2026	Elizabeth Bear	White Space	Saga Press / Victor Gollancz Ltd	

=== Retro-Hugos ===
Between the 1996 Worldcon and 2025 Worldcon, the World Science Fiction Society had the concept of "Retro-Hugos", in which the Hugo award could be retroactively awarded for 50, 75, or 100 years prior. Retro-Hugos could only be awarded for years after 1939 (the year of the first Worldcon) in which no Hugos were originally awarded. Retro-Hugos were awarded eight times, for 1939, 1941, 1943–1946, 1951, and 1954, though only once for series. Retro-Hugos for series do not note the original publishers.

Retro-Hugo winners and nominees
Year	Year awarded	Author(s)	Series	Ref.
1945	2020	H. P. Lovecraft*	The Cthulhu Mythos	
1945	2020	August Derleth et al.*	The Cthulhu Mythos	
1945	2020	Edmond Hamilton (as Brett Sterling)	Captain Future	
1945	2020	Kenneth Robeson	Doc Savage	
1945	2020	Lester Dent	Doc Savage	
1945	2020	Seabury Quinn	Jules de Grandin	
1945	2020	Edgar Rice Burroughs	Pellucidar	
1945	2020	Walter B. Gibson (as Maxwell Grant)	The Shadow	
