= Sensitivity reader =

Editor who identifies potentially offensive content

A sensitivity reader is someone hired to look for offensive content, stereotypes, and bias in a literary work, and to create a report for an author or publisher with suggested changes. The use of sensitivity readers has attracted criticism from some authors and members of the public, particularly with respect to the practice of re-editing works that were published in the past.

== Purpose ==
Proponents state "the literary quality of a work is substantially improved" when reviewed and copy-edited by others from "a specific Nation or community that the author is writing about". Helen Wicks, managing director for children's trade at Bonnier, describes the practice as playing "an important role in inclusive, forward-thinking publishing".

== US young adult fiction ==
From 2015, sensitivity readings became popular and influential in young adult fiction, partly in response to the movement for diversity in that genre. Sensitivity readers were brought in after pre-publication controversies for authors including Laura Moriarty (whose American Heart had its prestigious Kirkus Reviews star removed prior to publication in 2017) and Amélie Wen Zhao (Blood Heir). Kosoko Jackson, a sensitivity reader himself, withdrew his own novel A Place for Wolves over sensitivity concerns in 2019.

== Revisions of published works ==
Publishers have used sensitivity readers to flag content perceived as offensive in published works, such as outdated attitudes towards race or gender. In 2010, Hodder Children's Books published "contemporary" versions of Enid Blyton's Famous Five books which they described as having been "sensitively and carefully" revised to rephrase some outdated language, intending to make the works "timeless". This included replacing words whose meanings had changed (such as gay and queer), as well as updating obsolete terms (such as housemistress and school tunic) and removing terms like tinker which could be read more pejoratively than Blyton would have intended. The editions were withdrawn in 2016, after feedback from readers suggested that the editions were "not required". In 2023 the publisher said that it would be removing "inappropriate or offensive" terms but retaining old-fashioned terms as part of the series' setting.

As part of an ebook range in 2018, publisher Scholastic made edits to R.L. Stine's 1990s children's horror book series Goosebumps, "to keep the language current and avoid imagery that could negatively impact a young person’s view of themselves today, with a particular focus on mental health". Stine reported that the changes had not been shown to him.

From 2020 ownards, some digital editions of novels by Agatha Christie were altered to remove references to ethnicity, such as an "Indian temper" or a female character's body "of black marble". In 1940, the title of her novel, first published as Ten Little Niggers had been changed to And Then There Were None for the American market, with changes also being made to remove the term from the text, including the name of the island where the story takes place.

In February 2023, month, new editions of Roald Dahl's's children's novels published by Puffin Books, a division of Penguin Books, changed some of Dahl's language in line with recommendations by sensitivity readers. The decision was met with criticism from groups and public figures including the CEO of PEN America, Salman Rushdie, Brian Cox, Rishi Sunak, and Kemi Badenoch, as well as Fantastic Mr. Fox director Wes Anderson. Consequently, Puffin announced that it would also continue to sell the original, unaltered editions of Roald Dahl's children's novels, under the title The Roald Dahl Classic Collection.

On 26 February 2023, 7 days after the original announcement by Puffin Books, Ian Fleming Publications announced that Ian Fleming's James Bond series would receive several revisions, including removing racial slurs and a racist depiction of African Americans in Live and Let Die, following a review from sensitivity reviewers., A disclaimer in each book stated, "This book was written at a time when terms and attitudes which might be considered offensive by modern readers were commonplace. A number of updates have been made in this edition, while keeping as close as possible to the original text and the period in which it is set".

Charlie Higson, actor, comedian and author of the first five Young Bond prequel novels, defended the alterations, saying that sensitivity reading was "nothing new", citing the example of Christie's And Then There Were None.

Penguin Books' 2023 reedition of P. G. Wodehouse's 1934 novel Thank You, Jeeves included a disclaimer that the publisher had "sought to edit, minimally, words that we regard as unacceptable to present-day readers". This included the removal of racial slurs.

== Criticism ==
Following the controversy over the Jeanine Cummins novel American Dirt in 2020, the use of sensitivity readers was questioned.

Lionel Shriver, a critic of wokeness, accused sensitivity readers of being censorious, of being "new moral gatekeepers" or of offering a way to "cancel-proof your book".

Kate Clanchy wrote an essay in 2022 expressing her concerns that her sensitivity readers seemed "to concur that the past should match an idealised present", and to imply that writing "should represent the world as it ought to be, not as it is". Clanchy believed that the readers did not recognise irony and satire and wished "to eliminate journeys of thought across chapters, ambiguity from paragraphs, and nuance from sentences".

Novelist Anthony Horowitz wrote in 2023 that it felt "wrong to be told what to write by an outside party, no matter how well-meaning", when he accepted suggested changes to descriptions of native American characters in one of his books.

== See also ==
- Cultural diversity
- Expurgation (a.k.a. bowdlerization)
- Political correctness
- Woke
