= A Place for Wolves =

Cancelled young adult novel by Kosoko Jackson

- Book cover
- Author: Kosoko Jackson
- Language: English
- Genre: Romantic thriller Historical fiction Young adult fiction
- Set in: Kosovo
- ISBN: 978-1-492-67365-1

A Place for Wolves is a young adult novel by Kosoko Jackson. The novel follows James Mills, an American teenager who must flee war-torn Kosovo with his Brazilian boyfriend Tomas while searching for his missing parents.

Although the novel was scheduled to be published by Sourcebooks in 2019, it was canceled by Jackson soon before release when it faced backlash on social media for perceived insensitivities in its depiction of the Kosovo War. Media coverage examined the controversy through the frame of cancel culture.

== Plot ==
James Mills is a gay African American teenager adopted by his aid worker parents. James and his sister Anna (now a freshman at Georgetown University) have lived around the world with their doctor mother and engineer father. The story is told in alternating formats: first a chapter narrated by James during the war, followed by a letter from James to Anna written before the war.

In August 1997, James and his parents settle in the Kosovar village of Restelicë on their final tour of duty for USAID. The family meets a Brazilian couple working for Engineers Without Borders and their son, Tomas Sousa. James and Tomas attend school in Restelicë together with Clara, the daughter of the German ambassador. Professor Beqiri, their Oxford University–educated teacher, is a Kosovo Albanian who harbors resentment against Serbia. After James defends Tomas from a homophobic classmate and they collaborate on a school project, the pair grow closer and become boyfriends.

In February, tensions in Restelicë escalate, and Serbian paramilitaries beat up James’ friend Agon, the town historian. Many people flee or disappear from the town, including Clara and Beqiri.

One night, James and Tomas return to James’ home to find the house ransacked and deserted; a note from James' mother Maria tells them to go to the U.S. embassy in Pristina. Using Tomas' motorbike, the duo reaches Therandë, where they encounter civil unrest and narrowly survive a bombing. They next travel to the deserted town of Gremë in search of supplies and a map. James comes across the dying soldier Abaz, a Serbian Armed Forces member who was wounded during the attack on Prekaz. Abaz gives James his gun and tells him about the separatist Kosovo Liberation Army fighting for independence from Serbia.

James and Tomas abandon the noisy motorbike to avoid unwanted attention. While resting in the forest at night, James is startled by a desperate man stealing Tomas's shoes. James chases after the man and accidentally kills him.

Hiking through the Sharr Mountains, James and Tomas stop at an abandoned cabin. Clara unexpectedly appears at the cabin, having stumbled across the duo and quietly followed them. She tells them that she was abducted and taken to a camp of prisoners, including James' mother. Beqiri—revealed to be a KLA leader—tried to coerce Clara into filming a hostage video that would falsely accuse Serbians of her kidnapping in order to garner international support for Kosovo. However, she refused and managed to escape with the help of James' mother.

KLA soldiers arrive at the cabin, and the trio attempts to flee into the forest. James shoots and kills one of the soldiers in a panic. Tomas and James are separated from Clara and captured the next day by Beqiri. Tomas is shot in the hip by one of Beqiri's men. Beqiri threatens to leave Tomas to die unless James accompanies him to the KLA camp.

Inside the camp's prison, James reunites with his mother, who is providing medical care to Beqiri's captives. Beqiri explains to James that he joined the KLA due to Kosovo's poor economic conditions, which he blames on the Serbians. James and his mother are forced to watch as Beqiri fatally shoots Clara, who was recaptured by Beqiri's men.

James escapes from his cell by swallowing and regurgitating a key that his mother secretly passes him. He meets up with Tomas, his mother, and his father, who has been forced into manual labor at the camp. His mother distracts the guards on patrol, giving the others time to escape.

James, his father, and Tomas run into Bolton, one of Beqiri's guards. James and his father fight off Bolton together, taking the pistol from his unconscious body. Beqiri confronts them and dares James to shoot him, predicting that James lacks the resolve to pull the trigger. James shoots and kills Beqiri. Tomas and James mount a motorbike, and James' father tells them to head for the nearby NATO campsite while he returns to get James' mother. The pair break out of the compound, pursued by KLA soldiers.

In the novel's epilogue, Anna receives a phone call from James, who tells her that he will soon be returning to the United States.

== Background ==
A Place for Wolves was to be Jackson's debut novel. He had previously worked as a sensitivity reader for major publishing companies, identifying content regarded as offensive or problematic in book manuscripts.

Jackson, a gay black man, had been an advocate of the #ownvoices movement, which promotes books with characters of diverse identities written by authors who share those identities. He had argued that "stories about the civil rights movement should be written by black people" and criticized female authors who "profit" from stories about gay men. Although Jackson had at one point been interested in writing a book that dealt with themes of immigration, he later changed his mind after speaking with friends who were Latino.

Jackson had also been a prominent critic of Blood Heir by Amélie Wen Zhao, a young adult novel that in January 2019 faced accusations of racial insensitivity on social media before its publication. In response, Zhao first canceled the book, then decided to postpone its release while making revisions.

In an interview, Jackson said that in writing A Place for Wolves, he "wanted to chronicle a part of history that people don't often talk about" and also "remind people that queer and Black people existed through all points in time".

== Reception ==
=== Advance reviews ===
Prior to its publication date in March 2019, A Place for Wolves had received starred reviews from Booklist and School Library Journal. Booklist called the novel "a pulse-pounding, emotional roller coaster, showcasing Jackson’s ability to balance the tenderness of a love story against the complexities and horrors of a country at war." School Library Journal said that "Jackson has masterfully woven action, drama, and history in this fast-paced, impossible-to-put-down debut... The historical context of the Kosovo War is fleshed out accurately without overwhelming readers." The book was also selected for IndieBound's Spring 2019 "Kids' Indie Next" list.

Kirkus Reviews described A Place for Wolves as "an earnest freshman novel that celebrates love", but argued that the romance story was "incongruous with both the novel's setting and the dangerous events happening within the war-torn country." Wesley Jacques wrote in The Bulletin of the Center for Children's Books that the novel "oversimplified" the historical context with a "cartoonish" villain while lauding its "kickass queer representation".

The book's marketing included blurbs from young adult authors such as Shaun David Hutchinson, praising it as "a masterful debut," and Heidi Heilig, who called it "an intricate, rich story".

=== Reception on social media ===
Backlash to A Place for Wolves on social media began in February 2019 with a review posted on Goodreads. The review argued that the novel was insensitive because it emphasized the perspectives of Americans while using the war as merely a backdrop for the story. It criticized Jackson for writing about a largely Muslim country as a non-Muslim author with non-Muslim main characters.

In particular, the review condemned Jackson's choice to make the novel's villain an Albanian Muslim with the Kosovo Liberation Army (KLA), since Kosovo Albanians had been subject to widespread ethnic cleansing during the war and since it contributed to stereotypes about Muslims as terrorists. The review suggested that readers who enjoyed the novel might suffer from "subconscious Islamophobia" and argued that the book had potential to cause real-world harm.

The contents of the Goodreads review were quickly amplified and spread by members of Twitter's young adult fiction community. Since the book had not been released, most of those criticizing it had not read it. Heilig and others amended their formerly positive reviews, with Heilig apologizing "to those I've hurt by my blurb". Jackson's literary agent and the book's copy editor also apologized for their role in bringing the book to market. Jackson was dropped from the lineup of an upcoming literary festival and reportedly removed from a private Facebook group for young adult fiction.

Six days after the Goodreads review was posted, Jackson released a statement apologizing for the novel's "problematic representation and historical insensitivities", writing: "I failed to fully understand the people and the conflict that I set around my characters. I have done a disservice to the history and to the people who suffered." Jackson also announced that he had asked Sourcebooks to withdraw A Place for Wolves from publication. At the time of his announcement, 55,000 copies of the book had already been printed.

=== Reactions to the controversy ===
Following the backlash on social media, commentators took an interest in the book's artistic merits. Jennifer Senior of The New York Times said that although Jackson "can write with charm and the authentic sass of an American adolescent, much of the book is painfully clumsy and poorly paced — which makes it a fairly typical debut novel, by the way." After obtaining an advance copy of the book, journalist Jesse Singal wrote in Reason that A Place for Wolves "isn't great, but it didn't deserve to be canceled." He called Jackson's writing "clunky" and the book's characters "poorly developed," criticizing it for the "flatness" of the wartime setting.

Singal also mentioned several elements of the backlash to A Place for Wolves that he said were "untrue or exaggerated". For one, Singal questioned the interpretation that the villain was Muslim; he claimed that the villain's religion was not mentioned in the novel and the character did not fit the stereotypical "Muslim terrorist" trope. In addition, Singal took a more nuanced stance on the Kosovo War than many of the book's critics, who saw Albanians merely as victims of the conflict. He observed that while the opposing Serbian forces had perpetrated the majority of wartime atrocities, the KLA had also murdered civilians and committed other war crimes.

Multiple commentators noted the ferocity of the criticism from some of the book's detractors. Singal said that after covering the controversy on his Twitter account, he was subject to personal attacks from author L.L. McKinney. Senior described the young adult fiction community on Twitter as "a hothouse subculture — self-conscious, emotional, quick to injure." Ruth Graham of Slate criticized the incident as an example of the "increasingly toxic online culture" in young adult literature, "with evermore-baroque standards for who can write about whom under what circumstances."

== Analysis ==
Media coverage of A Place for Wolves' cancellation mainly examined it through the lens of cancel culture and online shaming. Katy Waldman wrote in The New Yorker that the debate surrounding the book "seems rooted in who gets to speak, and when, and how much power their words can wield". Waldman noted the irony that Jackson had previously been involved in assessing and calling out books for controversial content before becoming entangled in controversy himself.

The New York Times' Jennifer Senior called the incident "frightening", saying that A Place for Wolves "should have failed or succeeded in the marketplace of ideas" instead of being canceled outright. Senior predicted that attacking authors in the name of diversity would paradoxically lead to an overly censored "dreary monoculture" in book publishing.

Ruth Graham, in Slate, viewed the uproar over books such as A Place for Wolves and Blood Heir as counterproductive. Graham observed that the authors of both works were "people of color who now see their careers hobbled in an industry that claims to be laser-focused on diversity." She also remarked that those involved in these disputes were not the book's supposed audience of teenagers, but adults "shredding each other’s reputations under the guise of protecting the children."

In an article for Reason, Jesse Singal characterized the online critics of A Place for Wolves and other controversial young adult novels as "left-wing identitarians" who believed that "the more marginalized you are, the better you are as a person." Singal claimed that these critics were a highly vocal minority of young adult fiction readers on social media, making their views appear deceptively popular to publishers and authors and making it more difficult to identify truly problematic content.

The New Republic contributing editor Osita Nwanevu disagreed with the notion that Jackson had been a "casualty of cancel culture". Nwanevu noted that Jackson, not the publisher, had decided to cancel the book's publication, and that Jackson still had another novel set for release.

== See also ==
- The Black Witch
- Diversity in young adult fiction
