= The Black Witch =

2017 young adult fantasy novel by Laurie Forest

- Book cover
- Author: Laurie Forest
- Language: English
- Series: The Black Witch Chronicles
- Genre: Fantasy romance Young adult fiction
- Publisher: Harlequin Teen
- Publication date: 2017
- Publication place: United States
- Pages: 608
- ISBN: 978-0-373-21231-6
- Followed by: The Iron Flower

The Black Witch is a 2017 young adult fantasy romance novel by Laurie Forest. The novel faced backlash on social media prior to its release due to accusations of bigoted content. Later media coverage suggests that these criticisms were misguided and failed to understand the book's context.

== Plot ==
Elloren is a 17-year-old girl who lives in the land of Gardneria, a diverse yet stratified society of different magical races (such as selkies, dryads, fae, wyvern, and wolfmen). Many citizens of Gardneria, known as "Gardnerian Mages" including Elloren, harbor prejudices about other races. Elloren's grandmother Carnissa, known as the Black Witch, was a powerful mage and military leader; however, Elloren herself appears to lack magical powers.

When Elloren leaves for college at the magical and multicultural Verpax University, she makes friends with classmates of different races and begins to question her own prejudices and beliefs about the society of her birth. At the end of the novel, she joins the growing rebellion against the government of Gardneria.

== Reception ==
=== Advance reviews ===
The first reviews of The Black Witch before its publication were positive. Kirkus Reviews gave the book a starred review, describing it as "a massive page-turner that leaves readers longing for more." Another starred review in Publishers Weekly called the book an "intoxicating tale of rebellion and star-crossed romance" that "argues passionately against fascism and xenophobia."

=== Social media reception ===
In March 2017, a book blogger published a roughly 9,000-word advance review of The Black Witch, calling it "the most dangerous, offensive book I have ever read". The review's author claimed that the novel included multiple forms of bigotry, including racism, ableism, and homophobia.

Much of the review consisted of quotations from the book's prejudiced characters, including the narrator Elloren. In one example, Elloren criticizes another magical race as "hopelessly mixed" and "not a pure race like us" because "they're more accepting of intermarriage". She also reacts negatively when her gay brother comes out to her.

The accusations spread widely on social media platforms such as Twitter and Tumblr, and The Black Witch quickly became subject to review bombing, receiving hundreds of negative reviews on Goodreads. The backlash was based almost entirely on the initial review, with most Goodreads reviewers admitting that they had not read the book themselves and did not plan to. Many of those criticizing the book mistakenly believed that Forest herself shared the viewpoints of her prejudiced characters.

The Black Witch's publisher, Harlequin Teen, received a slate of emails demanding the book's cancellation. Critics such as writer L.L. McKinney argued that Forest, as a white author, lacked the ability to convincingly write "an examination of racism in an attempt to dismantle it". At the height of the backlash, Forest was baselessly accused of being a Nazi sympathizer, while those who objected to this rhetoric were accused of being bigots themselves.

=== Responses to backlash ===
During the controversy, dozens of The Black Witch's critics wrote to Kirkus Reviews, demanding that the book's starred review be retracted. In response, Kirkus published an essay by editor Vicky Smith defending the initial review. Smith claimed that Elloren undergoes a "monumental change" throughout the course of the novel, comparing her to former white supremacists such as Adrianne Black who were raised in a bigoted environment. Smith also argued that Elloren's slow pace of transformation was realistic and made narrative sense for the first entry in a multi-book series.

Despite the protests, The Black Witch was published on schedule in May 2017, reaching number 1 in Amazon's "Teen & Young Adult Wizards Fantasy" book category. Most reviewers after the book's release agreed that it took a firm stance against prejudice, and that Elloren's change during the story was realistic.

Forest later called the debate about her book "a worthwhile discussion," adding: "I think there is a need for diversity in all phases of publishing, and it’s exciting to see that happening. The Black Witch explores what it’s like to grow up in a closed-minded culture, and its message is that people who may have been raised with prejudiced views can change for the better. But it takes time and education."

== Media coverage ==
The social media controversy surrounding The Black Witch was extensively covered in Kat Rosenfield's Vulture article "The Toxic Drama on YA Twitter." Rosenfield connected the incident to "a growing dysfunction" in young adult book publishing, with an online atmosphere of constant harassment, threats, and fears of voicing one's opinion. She interviewed a number of writers and publishing professionals concerned that outrages on social media would have a chilling effect on the industry, including which topics authors would choose to write about.

Rosenfield's reporting on the incident became a matter of controversy itself. After declining Rosenfield's request for comment, the author of the initial review claimed on Twitter that she had been "scared" by their interaction, causing rumors to spread about Rosenfield's behavior. Multiple authors warned their followers not to speak to Rosenfield about the article, and nearly all of her sources requested anonymity, afraid of the personal and professional repercussions. Author Roxane Gay also faced backlash on Twitter after retweeting Rosenfield's article, with commenters accusing Gay of entering a debate beyond her purview.

An editorial for The Globe and Mail by librarian Shannon Ozirny argued that Rosenfield's reporting did not give a full picture of the climate in young adult publishing, since it was "framed and executed as an exposé rather than a discussion." Ozirny claimed that Rosenfield's article only touched on "far larger debates" about issues such as book censorship, herd mentality on social media, and the most effective ways to protest potentially harmful works.

In a 2019 Reason article, journalist Jesse Singal linked the uproar over The Black Witch to more recent controversies in young adult fiction, such as Blood Heir and A Place for Wolves, in which the author decided to cancel or postpone the book's publication. He called Rosenfield's interview subjects "prescient," writing: "In 2019, books are not only getting excoriated by online critics who haven't read them—they're getting unpublished entirely."

== Series ==
The Black Witch is the first novel in Forest's five-part series The Black Witch Chronicles. The other books in the series are:

- The Iron Flower (2018)
- The Shadow Wand (2020)
- The Demon Tide (2022)
- The Dryad Storm (2025)

Forest has also written two prequels to The Black Witch: Wandfasted (2017) and Light Mage (2018).

== See also ==
- Diversity in young adult fiction
- Online shaming
