= DignidadLiteraria =

Hashtag and grassroots campaign

#DignidadLiteraria
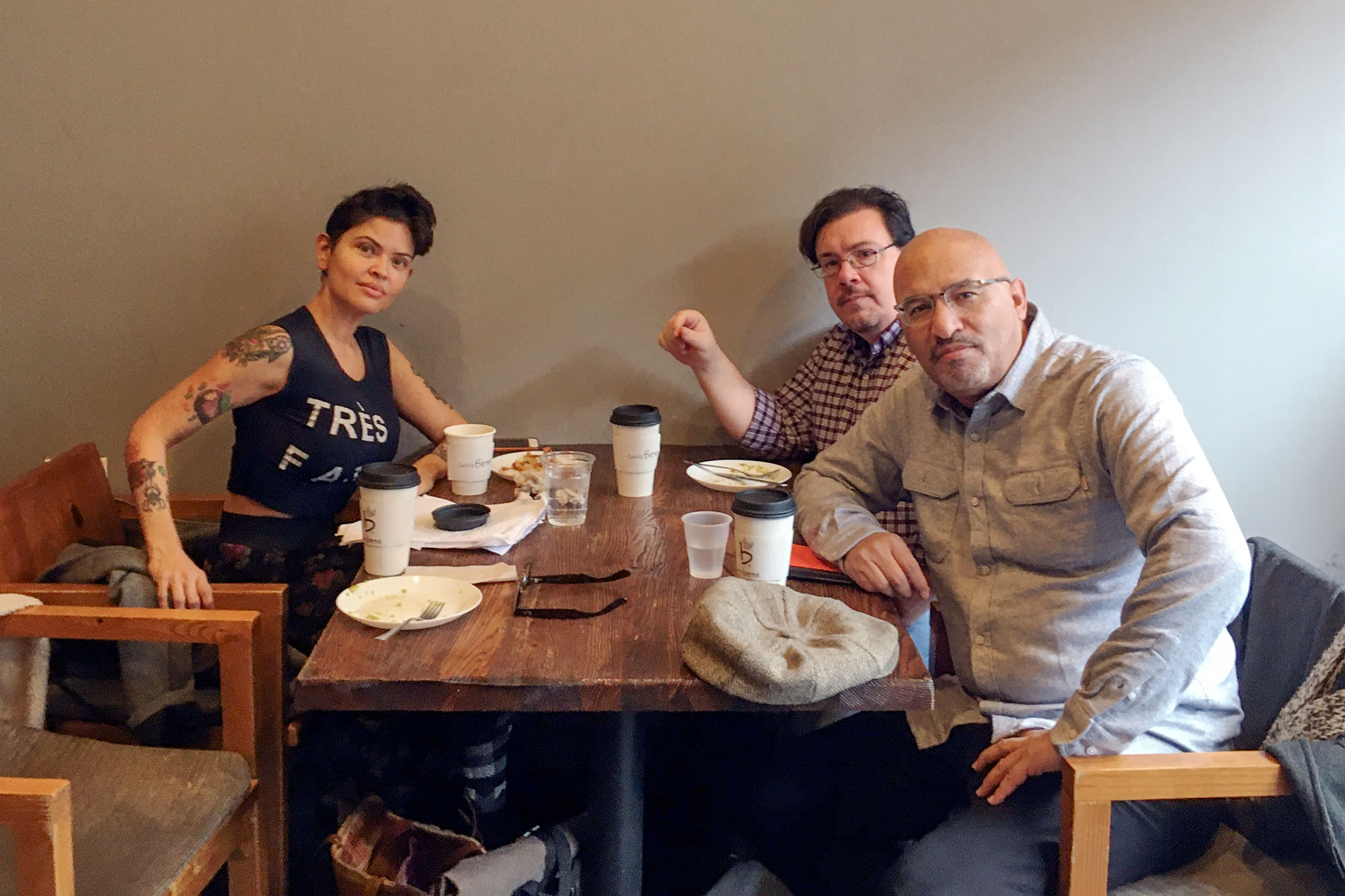
- Left to right: Gurba, Bowles and Lovato
- Formation: 2020
- Founders: Myriam Gurba; David Bowles; Roberto Lovato
- Type: Social movement
- Location(s): International (mostly in the United States)

#DignidadLiteraria (English: #LiteraryDignity) is a Spanish-language hashtag, used chiefly on Twitter, and a grassroots campaign for greater Latino inclusion in the U.S. publishing industry.

== Purpose ==
#DignidadLiteraria was formed the last week of January 2020 by journalist Roberto Lovato, and the authors Myriam Gurba, and David Bowles, in response to the controversy surrounding the novel by Jeanine Cummins, American Dirt. The controversy exploded after Gurba wrote her now historic review of the book in Tropics of Meta, after Ms. magazine rejected her review because she was not well-known enough to write a negative review. The article led others, including Bowles, to join her in what became a firestorm of Latino and other critics of the book.

The hashtag was first used in relation to the controversy surrounding American Dirt in a tweet by Roberto Lovato on January 22, "The fight is just starting. Stay tuned for #DignidadLiteraria." The campaign was officially announced on Twitter on January 26 with a call to action, "We call on Latinx writers, artists, & rebels to join us in staging actions this coming week: inspired, angry, beautiful actions that will draw the nation's attention to a community of 60 million left off of bookshelves & out of the national dialogue, a community targeted because the humanity of our stories is still being muted." The campaign calls for actions on Twitter, Instagram, and in real life.

=== Response ===
In response to the grassroots call to action, on Twitter thousands of tweets that used the hashtag #DignidadLiteraria were tweeted, readings were held, 11 cities held events in a matter of days, and books by Latino authors were virally shared and promoted on social media platforms.

On January 30 REFORMA, the national association to promote library and information services to Latinos and Spanish speaking, issued a "Statement in Solidarity with #DignidadLiteraria". In the statement REFORMA indicated they had started discussions to establish a dedicated reading list and annual Adult Fiction Award "highlighting the stories that are written by and resonate with Latinos." They called on their members to "be a part of this movement." REFORMA has 20 active chapters.

Following Gurba's review of American Dirt, publications such as The New York Times and The New Yorker, asked Gurba to write further editorials on Cummins' novel. Gurba has described how these large media outlets, "wanted me to continue doing this anti-American Dirt song and dance for clicks and it got stale very quickly. The offers were so narrow in terms of what people wanted me to discuss and how they wanted me to discuss it and the anger that they wanted me to perform".

=== Impact ===
On February 3, representatives for #DignidadLiteraria met in New York City with officials from Macmillan, the parent company of Flatiron Books, which published American Dirt. It was there that David Bowles read a statement that Macmillan had agreed to transform publishing practices to increase Latino authors, books, and staff. During the meeting Macmillan committed to developing an action plan to address these goals within 90 days. The meeting included Bob Miller and Don Weisberg, presidents of Flatiron and Macmillan; Amy Einhorn; representatives for Oprah Winfrey; and #DignidadLiteraria co-founders Bowles, Myriam Gurba, Roberto Lovato and Matt Nelson, who was providing online support to the #DignidadLiteraria effort.

Less than two weeks after the launch of the campaign, Latino authors reported a jump in book sales, attributing it to social media campaigns drawing attention to their work.

The group was also instrumental in getting Barnes & Noble to cancel its "Diverse Editions" line of canonical classics written by and featuring white people, but with new variant covers that changed the race and/or ethnicity of the protagonists, a choice widely decried as brown- and black-face. David Bowles used Twitter to call for a protest at the line's launch event at 6 pm on February 5, 2020, at the Barnes & Noble location on 5th Avenue to talk to reporters and to a representative of Penguin Random House, the publisher partnering with Barnes & Noble to release the "Diverse Editions." That very day, Barnes & Noble cancelled the event and the line of books.

== Background and strategy ==
Roberto Lovato, the creator of the hashtag #DignidadLiteraria and co-founder of the #DignidadLiteraria movement, has worked in the field of strategy for many years. Much of the strategy of the #DignidadLiteraria campaign against Flatiron-Macmillan was based on corporate campaign models developed by Presente.org, the largest online group of Latinos in the United States. Presente.org, which was co-founded by Lovato, was involved in the highly publicized ousting of Lou Dobbs from CNN in 2009, "Basta Dobbs".

In January 2020, approximately one week before Flatiron Press issued its controversial press release about the cancellation of the American Dirt book tour, Lovato predicted the publisher would turn Cummins into a "victim in need of protection fr [sic] the barbarian hordes disturbed by her book." The following week the American Dirt tour was cancelled, based on threats, according to the Flatiron CEO, Bob Miller. Stephen King, The Washington Post critic Ron Charles, and other defenders of the book denounced the alleged threats while Gurba, Bowles, and others asked Miller and Flatiron to produce evidence of them. During their meeting with Flatiron and Macmillan on February 3, executives confirmed to Gurba, Bowles, and Lovato that Cummins had received no death threats, and in an article published in Slate on January 31, reporter Laura Miller states Flatiron representatives indicated the threat was to a "potential speaker" other than Cummins. While there has been no evidence produced of threats to Cummins, Gurba herself has received death threats for her criticism.

In addition to #DignidadLiteraria, other hashtags (hashtag activism) promoting diversity in US publishing include #OwnVoices, #DisruptTexts, #DiversityJedi and #WeNeedDiverseBooks (the leaders of which eventually founded the non-profit We Need Diverse Books), and #PublishingPaidMe.
