= Juan Crow =

State and local laws against undocumented immigrants in the Southwestern United States

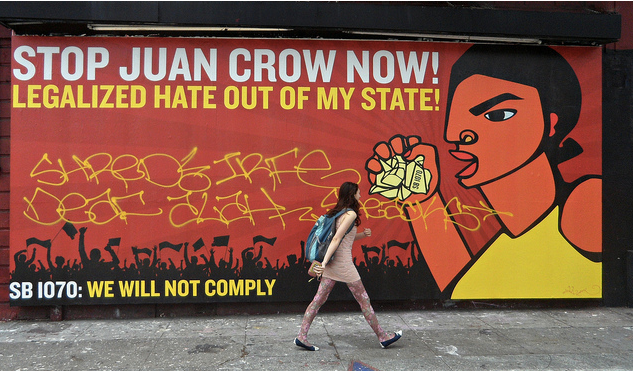
Juan Crow mural

Juan Crow is political terminology that was coined by journalist Roberto Lovato. It first gained popularity when he used it in an article for The Nation magazine in 2008. "Call it Juan Crow: the matrix of laws, social customs, economic institutions and symbolic systems enabling the physical and psychic isolation needed to control and exploit undocumented immigrants." Lovato utilized the term to criticize immigration enforcement laws by analogizing them to Jim Crow laws, and has since become popular among immigration activists.

In recent years, the term Juan Crow has also been used retrospectively to discuss the historical discrimination against Hispanic Americans (particularly in former parts of Mexico) in the U.S. as analogous to the treatment of African Americans in the Jim Crow era, specifically as related to mob violence and segregation in schools.

== Immigration enforcement ==
The term Juan Crow was first used to refer to immigration enforcement statutes in the United States that penalize illegal immigration and deny services to undocumented people living in the U.S. unlawfully.

Laws in Arizona, Alabama, Georgia, and Texas have been considered Juan Crow laws.

California's Proposition 187 was considered a Juan Crow law by immigration activists. It required citizenship screening of residents and denied social services like health care and public education to undocumented immigrants.

== Mob violence ==
The term Juan Crow has also been used to refer to historical instances of mob violence, as well as de facto discrimination that specifically targeted Mexicans and people of Mexican descent. Between the years 1848 and 1928, mob violence against people of Mexican descent totaled 547 lynchings. Texas holds the highest tally with 232 victims. Other Southwest states, which include California, Arizona, and New Mexico, range between 25 and 143 lynching murders.

In the 1850s, after the Mexican-American war, Anglo-Americans were concerned about the potentiality of Mexican-Americans responding to Mexican newspapers that called for the Reconquista (reconquering). Consequently, Anglo-Americans advocated for the systemic inequity of Mexican-Americans through social exclusion and lynchings. The mistreatment persisted for several decades, with the Texas Rangers acting as enforcers and overseeing 232 Mexican-American men to violent attacks by mob violence between 1848 and 1928.

Mexican-Americans were often victims of lynching by Anglo-American society, but there were also occurrences of Mexicans lynching Mexicans. In particular, Mexican-Americans of higher class status who were aligned with Anglo ranchers participated in such acts. The culture's acceptance of lynching impacted Mexican standards during the 19th and 20th centuries. Mexican Americans were not only hanged, but mob violence included other forms of brutality such as shooting, burning people alive, physical mutilation, and other deadly acts of persecution.

During the 1870s and 1880s, the use of the derogatory term “greaser” promoted the Texas Rangers to carry out a campaign against the Mexican populace of the Rio Grande Valley. They believed that by instilling fear, they could more effectively suppress the Mexican population.

In 1918, a group of Anglo ranchers and the Texas Rangers arrived at a village in Presidio County, Porvenir, where 140 refugees, including women, children, and men, resided. Despite no evidence of weapons or stolen goods, thirteen Mexican men and two teenage boys were killed on suspicion of banditry. The Porvenir massacre, as described by historian Miguel A. Levario, exposed the violence committed by the Rangers against Mexicans.

With a dual identity, the Texas Rangers are an emblem of Texan pride from an Anglo perspective. They enhanced the quality of life for colonists by actively confronting and defeating Indigenous peoples, outlaws, and Mexicans. However, for their Mexican and Indigenous victims, they are a source of terror, cruelty, and oppression.

== Juan Crow in education ==
The segregation of Mexican American students in academia is a disputed topic with various perspectives. The state did not officially sanction their discrimination and Mexicans normally attended segregated white schools in Texas and the Southwestern states. Some scholars argue there was de facto segregation from the local customs that intentionally separated Mexican American into "special ed" classes in many districts. In contrast, others express it was de jure segregation as school officials enforced their policies. Although legally classified as "White," some historians argue that Mexican Americans were socially perceived as "colored" and subject to segregation in schools and communities. Despite the lack of state-sanctioned segregation laws, it was a prevalent trend in the American Southwest.

== See also ==
- Alabama HB 56
- Arizona SB 1070
- California Proposition 187
- Georgia Security and Immigration Compliance Act
