= Blood Heir =

2019 novel by Amélie Wen Zhao

- First edition
- Author: Amélie Wen Zhao
- Audio read by: Emily Woo Zeller
- Language: English
- Series: Blood Heir
- Release number: 1
- Genre: Fantasy; Young adult fiction
- Publisher: Delacorte
- Publication date: November 19, 2019
- Publication place: United States
- Media type: Print, digital
- Pages: 464 (hardcover)
- ISBN: 978-0525707790
- Followed by: Red Tigress

Blood Heir is the 2019 young adult fantasy debut novel by Chinese-American author Amélie Wen Zhao. It follows Anastacya Mikhailov, a princess with the magical ability to control blood who searches for her father's killer after being framed for his murder. The novel draws inspiration from the real-world issues of human trafficking and indentured servitude.

Prior to its publication by Delacorte Press, Blood Heir was subject to controversy due to allegations of racial insensitivity and other issues. Zhao subsequently decided to postpone the book's release to make further revisions. The book has been criticized for supposedly insensitive depictions of American slavery, but Zhao has clarified that she drew inspiration from China's history of indentured labor and not from its American counterpart.

== Plot ==
Anastacya Mikhailov is the crown princess of the Cyrilian Empire, "a glittering land of ice and snow". Affinites—people with various magical powers allowing them to control their surroundings—are a feared and persecuted underclass in the empire. Many Affinites are enslaved and exploited for their supposedly unnatural abilities.

Ana herself has an extremely rare Affinity to blood: she can sense its presence in others and manipulate it. When she was a young girl, her powers resulted in the accidental deaths of eight people at an outdoor market in the capital city of Salskoff, causing rumors to spread about a vicious "blood witch". Since then, her family has hidden her within the royal palace, claiming that she is ill.

When Ana's father, the emperor, is poisoned, she is framed for his murder after she is discovered next to his body, covered in his blood. She recognizes the true killer, an alchemist formerly employed at the palace, but does not know his identity. After escaping, Ana is believed to be dead and goes on the run for nearly a year.

In need of assistance, Ana breaks the criminal mastermind Ramson Quicktongue out of prison. Ramson was incarcerated after plotting to kill Ana's brother Luka, the new emperor. He was hired for the job by Alaric Kerlan, a powerful businessman and Affinite trafficker. Ana and Ramson reach the dacha where Ana lives with her young friend May, a fellow Affinite who can control earth, rocks, and plants.

Seeking information about the alchemist, the trio travels to the city of Kyrov, where May is captured by imperial guards. Ramson learns that the alchemist—who now works for Kerlan—is named Pyetr Tetsyev, and that he was responsible for Ramson's arrest by leaking the plot to kill Luka. Ramson also realizes that Ana is the legendary blood witch of Salskoff and considers trading her to Kerlan, but decides to overthrow Kerlan's business empire instead.

Ramson and Ana track May to the Playpen, a nightclub in the city of Novo Minsk where Affinites are forced to perform for entertainment and are secretly trafficked. While they watch May's performance, the club is attacked by Affinite rebels called Redcloaks, who attempt to kill Ana. May saves Ana's life but dies in the process. Ana's childhood friend Yuri, a Redcloak, tells her that Luka is ill, and she suspects that Luka is being poisoned, like her father. Ana uses her Affinity to kill the broker who trafficked May at the Playpen.

Ana and Ramson attend a ball at Kerlan's estate, where Tetsyev will be present. Ana confronts Tetsyev, who tells her that he was being controlled by Ana's aunt Morganya, an Affinite who can manipulate people's minds. He informs her that Morganya poisoned Ana's mother when Ana was young and that she is planning to subjugate non-Affinites under her rule by assuming power after Luka's death. Morganya has also joined forces with Kerlan and was responsible for the conspiracy to kill Luka.

Ramson meets with Kerlan, intending to assassinate him, but he is subdued and tortured. Tetsyev rescues him and tells him about Ana's true identity as the crown princess. Ana and Ramson separately make their way to the palace to confront Morganya, reuniting in Salskoff.

Sneaking into the palace, Ana and Ramson encounter Kerlan. Ramson fights him off together with Linn, an Affinite whom he purchased and freed at the Playpen. In the palace's throne room, Ana discovers Morganya and Luka, who is planning to abdicate due to his poor health. After realizing that Morganya is controlling Luka, Ana uses her own Affinity to break the spell. Luka announces that he will cede the throne to Ana instead, but he is killed by the imperial advisor Sadov, Morganya's ally. Ana nearly kills Sadov with her Affinity in retaliation but decides not to.

While Morganya assumes the throne, Tetsyev helps Ana fake her death by giving her a paralysis poison. Ana and Ramson escape the palace dungeons with the help of imperial guards who secretly oppose Morganya. Ana informs Ramson that she plans to travel south to find Yuri and the Redcloaks and join the rebellion against Morganya.

== Background ==
Zhao was born in Paris and raised in Beijing; she immigrated from China to the United States at the age of 18. She studied economics at the University of California, Los Angeles and New York University, before working in the finance industry in Manhattan.

Zhao found her literary agent during a pitching event on Twitter for writers of marginalized backgrounds. Her proposed fantasy trilogy, described as "Anastasia meets Six of Crows", sold at auction to Delacorte, reportedly for a high six-figure deal.

Prior to the publication of Blood Heir, Zhao had established herself as an active member of Twitter's young adult fiction community, known as "YA Twitter". Kat Rosenfield of Vulture wrote that on social media, Zhao was "an enthusiastic, effective communicator who was deeply engaged with issues of diversity and knew how to make herself heard".

The idea for Blood Heir came to Zhao during a family trip to Russia in 2014. She also drew on real-world issues such as human trafficking and indentured servitude in Asia as inspiration for the book. In a tweet, she explained why the book did not feature Chinese themes, writing: "I don't want to be boxed into the permanent 'Other'; I want diverse books written by [people of color] to become part of the mainstream."

== Release and reception ==
=== Pre-release ===
Blood Heir was originally scheduled for release in June 2019. Early reviews of the book from readers with advance copies were largely positive. In January 2019, however, some social media users accused the book of racial insensitivity and other issues, causing Zhao to postpone its release until November. The controversy was covered by journalists Jesse Singal in Tablet and Kat Rosenfield in Vulture, as well as publications such as Slate, The New York Times, and The New Yorker.

==== Whisper campaign ====
In January, a whisper campaign began against Zhao on Twitter, with one user claiming that Zhao had been collecting screenshots of readers who disliked Blood Heir. The Twitter user suggested that this constituted a threat to readers, saying that they "should be aware of this for their own protection". Rosenfield said that the Twitter user "declined to offer proof" of Zhao's behavior, while Singal found no evidence to support the claims.

==== Allegations of racial insensitivity ====
Circa January 2019, while revision of the book was underway, several users on Twitter accused the author of writing a book that lacked sensitivity towards African-Americans, based on passages about slaves being sold at an auction.

Zhao issued an apology and asked the publisher to delay the book's release. According to the author, the slavery passages were based on examples of indentured labor and human trafficking in Asia, including from her native country, rather than American slavery. Katy Waldman of The New Yorker wrote that "[i]f anything, the damning readings of Blood Heir seem guilty of something that the Y.A. community mitigates against: the misapprehension of a cultural context unfamiliar to one's own."

==== Plagiarism allegations ====
Some of Blood Heir's critics also claimed that the book contained plagiarized material. These allegations were mainly based on a single line from the book, "Don't go where I can't follow", originally from The Lord of the Rings. Singal and journalist Robby Soave argued that the line was more likely an homage. Aja Hoggatt of Slate said that the plagiarism accusations had "barely" any merit, while Rosenfield said that they were "shaky at best".

==== Response from Zhao ====
In April 2019, Zhao announced that the book's publication had been rescheduled. Despite her views on the prior criticism, she made further revisions. Editor Krista Marino stated that they "worked to further establish the nuances of indentured labor and trafficking within this fantasy world, without changing major plot points". The publisher asked people who were to examine the work for possible representations of racial groups that would upset readers and also asked scholars to review it.

=== Post-release ===
Blood Heir was released in November 2019. In its review of the novel, Kirkus Reviews concluded that there was "no new ground broken", but that it was "a good read for those looking for bloody action and twisty politics". Publishers Weekly wrote that "Zhao's plot imperils its protagonists time and again, leading the arc to feel repetitive and the protagonists less than capable", concluding that the novel "may garner readership despite the melodrama".

== Series ==
Blood Heir is the first book in a three-part series of the same name. It is followed by Red Tigress (2021) and Crimson Reign (2022).

== See also ==
- A Place for Wolves
- The Black Witch
- Cancel culture
- Diversity in young adult fiction
