= Hal Herzog =

American anthrozoologist

Hal Herzog is an American psychologist and anthrozoologist. He is emeritus professor of psychology at Western Carolina University.

In the 1970s, Herzog earned his Ph.D. at the University of Tennessee. His doctoral dissertation studied the culture around cockfighting. He had previously taught at Mars Hill College.

In 2005, Herzog received Western Carolina University's University Scholar Award. In 2013, Herzog received the Distinguished Scholar Award from the International Association of Human-Animal Interaction Organizations and the International Society for Anthrozoology.

His 2010 book, Some We Love, Some We Hate, Some We Eat: Why It's So Hard To Think Straight About Animals, explores inconsistencies in human attitudes toward different types of animals, such as how cultural context influences whether animals are viewed as food or as pets. Philosopher R. Paul Thompson called the book a "very important contribution to understanding our ongoing struggle in our relationships with nonhuman animals".

His daughter, Katie Herzog, is a journalist and co-host of the podcast Blocked and Reported.

== Bibliography ==
- Herzog, Hal (2010). Some We Love, Some We Hate, Some We Eat: Why It's So Hard To Think Straight About Animals. New York: HarperCollins. ISBN 978-0-06-173086-3.
