= Oprah's Book Club (TV series) =

TV series

- Promotional poster
- Genre: Talk show
- Based on: Oprah's Book Club segment on The Oprah Winfrey Show
- Presented by: Oprah Winfrey
- Opening theme: "Good As Hell" by Lizzo
- Country of origin: United States
- Original language: English
- No. of seasons: 1
- No. of episodes: 13

Production
- Executive producer: Tara Montgomery
- Producer: Lindsay Flader
- Editor: Jay Eckensberger
- Running time: 8–66 minutes
- Production companies: Harpo Productions; Inventive Media

Original release
- Network: Apple TV+
- Release: November 1, 2019 – October 22, 2021

Related
- Oprah's Book Club segment on The Oprah Winfrey Show

Oprah's Book Club is a television talk show produced for Apple TV+ and hosted by Oprah Winfrey.

== Premise ==
The series is a standalone spinoff of the popular Oprah's Book Club segment of The Oprah Winfrey Show, begun in 1996 and marks its first return to the television medium since the 2011 conclusion of Winfrey's television show. It is also a successor to Oprah's Book Club 2.0, a non-televised and irregularly-released online iteration of the reading series launched in 2012.

Episodes are released every two months, with each episode focused on a single book and featuring an interview between Winfrey and the book's author. Episodes are filmed at various locations. Each episode's book pick is announced at the end of the previous episode, as well as a dedicated section on Apple Books and on Oprah's website. Episodes are typically filmed in front of a live audience and feature an interview between Winfrey and the selected book's author.

== Episodes ==
No. in season	Book	Author	Original release date
1	The Water Dancer	Ta-Nehisi Coates	November 1, 2019
2	Olive, Again	Elizabeth Strout	January 17, 2020
3	American Dirt Part 1	Jeanine Cummins	March 6, 2020
4	American Dirt Part 2	Jeanine Cummins	March 6, 2020
5	Hidden Valley Road	Robert Kolker	June 12, 2020
6	Deacon King Kong	James McBride	July 31, 2020
7	Caste: The Origins of Our Discontents	Isabel Wilkerson	October 2, 2020
8	Gilead	Marilynne Robinson	April 23, 2021
9	Home	Marilynne Robinson	April 30, 2021
10	Lila	Marilynne Robinson	May 7, 2021
11	Jack	Marilynne Robinson	May 14, 2021
12	The Sweetness of Water	Nathan Harris	July 23, 2021
13	The Love Songs of W.E.B. Du Bois	Honorée Fanonne Jeffers	September 23, 2021
14	Bewilderment	Richard Powers	October 22, 2021

== Production ==
On June 15, 2018, Apple announced a multiyear partnership with Winfrey, saying she would work on projects to be "released as part of a lineup of original content from Apple."

On March 25, 2019 Apple hosted keynote event at its California campus to announce the new Apple TV+ subscription service. Winfrey appeared onstage to conclude the event, announcing that she would be producing two documentary series, as well launching a "book club" in partnership with Apple. During her announcement, Winfrey indicated the book club project may include a simulcast element at Apple's retail locations "where Apple Stores stream a conversation with the author and me live across all devices, across all borders". On September 23, 2019 in a press release, Apple announced the series would be titled Oprah's Book Club, would stream exclusively on Apple TV+, and would premiere with the streaming service's launch on November 1, 2019.

== Related media ==
Along with the announcement of the show, Apple announced that Oprah's Book Club would integrate with Apple Books by allowing users of the e-reading application to be alerted of new picks, and that Apple would make an unspecified contribution to the American Library Association for each Oprah Book Club selection sold via Apple Books.

As with the two previous iterations of the Club, the selection of a book by Winfrey typically results in the publication of an "Oprah edition", often with a branded "Oprah's Book Club" seal on the book's cover.

Winfrey's September 2019 pick of The Water Dancer by Ta-Nehisi Coates marked the first time in the Oprah Book Club's three iterations a book had been selected as a pick prior to its publication (in this case, one day prior). Thus, all published editions of The Water Dancer currently in circulation feature an "Oprah's Book Club 2019" seal.
