= Myriam Gurba =

American novelist

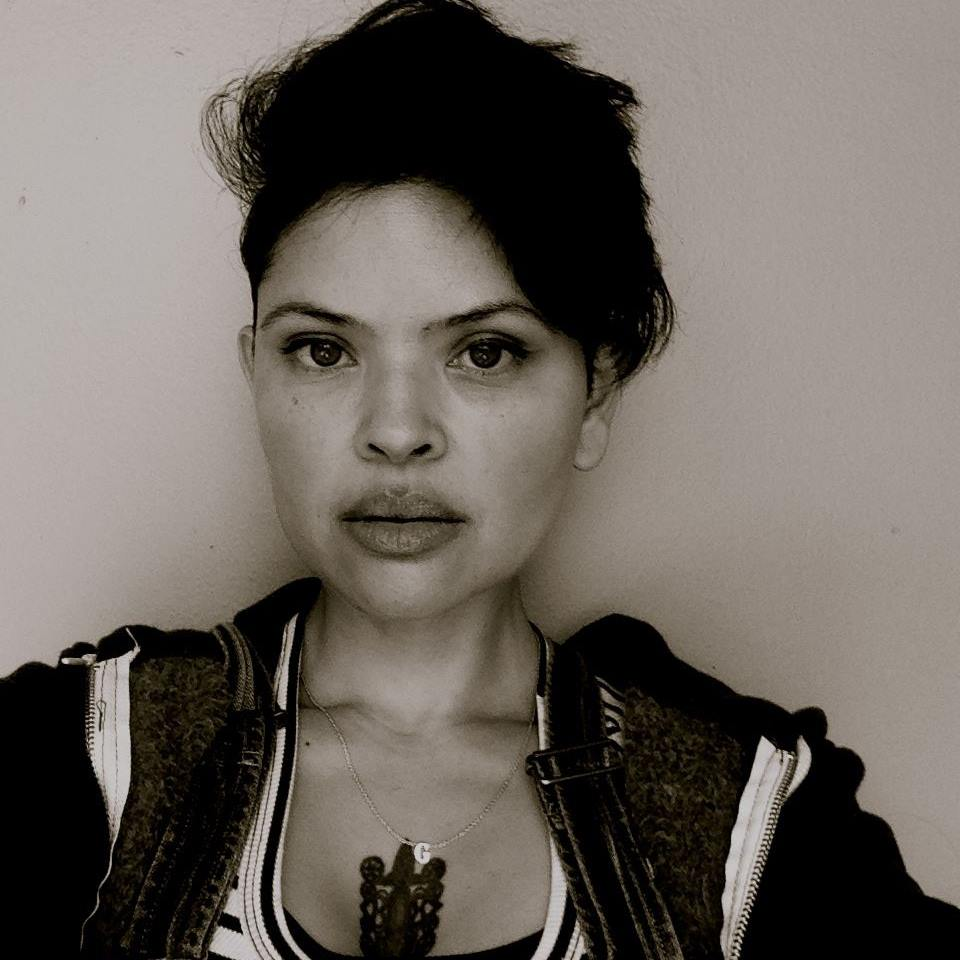
- Myriam Gurba
- Born: 1976 or 1977 (age 49–50); Santa Maria, California, U.S.
- Education: University of California, Berkeley
- Occupations: Writer, critic, visual artist
- Notable work: Mean (2017); Creep (2023)
- Website: Official website

Myriam Gurba (born 1976 or 1977) is an American writer, critic, and visual artist. She is the author of the memoir Mean (2017), named by The New York Times as one of the best memoirs of 2017 and included by O, The Oprah Magazine among the "Best LGBTQ Books Ever," and the essay collection Creep: Accusations and Confessions (2023), a finalist for the National Book Critics Circle Award for Criticism and winner of the 2024 Lambda Literary Award for Bisexual Nonfiction.

In 2019, her critique of Jeanine Cummins's novel American Dirt, published in Tropics of Meta, went viral and helped spark national debate about race, representation, and publishing practices in the United States. Following the controversy, she co-founded #DignidadLiteraria, a campaign advocating for greater inclusion of Latinx writers in the publishing industry.

== Career ==
Gurba's literary career began in the queer publishing industry. Her first job after graduating from the University of California, Berkeley was at On Our Backs magazine, a lesbian erotic magazine "made by lesbians for lesbians". She toured the United States with Sister Spit, a "lesbian-feminist spoken-word and performance art collective" in 2011 and 2015.

She has exhibited art works at the Museum of Latin American Art and The Center Long Beach.

== Works ==
Gurba is the author of Creep: Accusations and Confessions (Avid Reader Press, 2023), Mean (Coffee House Press, 2017), Dahlia Season: Stories and a Novella (Manic D Press/Future Tense, 2007), and Painting Their Portraits in Winter: Stories which explores Mexican stories and traditions through a feminist lens. She is also the author of various chapbooks including Wish You Were Me (Future Tense Books, 2011), Sweatsuits of the Damned (RADAR Productions, 2013), and River Candy (eohippus labs, 2015).

Gurba is the Editor-in-Chief of Tasteful Rude, an online magazine published by The Brick House Cooperative. Tasteful Rude showcases "criticism, analysis, and commentary about [...] art, culture, technology, religion, [and] politics".

She has written for Time, The Paris Review, American Book Review, ColorLines, and Believer Magazine.

Gurba's review of the book American Dirt in Tropics of Meta sparked controversy about cultural appropriation, the white gaze, racism, #ownvoices, and lack of diversity in the publishing industry. The review for Tropics of Meta was written after a previous review, commissioned by Ms. Magazine, was rejected for being too negative. Gurba's review, along with the hashtag #DignidadLiteraria, went viral in early 2020.

Since 2017, she and fellow author MariNaomi have been hosting an advice podcast called AskBiGrlz where they answer listener questions.

== Awards ==
Gurba's debut novel Dahlia Season won The Edmund White Award for Debut Fiction from Publishing Triangle, and was a finalist for a Lambda Literary Award. Dazed ranked Dahlia Season among their list of queer lit classics. Emily Gould described Gurba as "a new writer for the first time whose voice is different from any you've heard before and who you want to keep hearing forever." Gurba's third book Mean was a finalist for the Judy Grahn Award in 2018. Her fourth book Creep was a National Book Critics Circle Award finalist for criticism and won the 2024 Lambda Literary Award for Bisexual Nonfiction.

== Bibliography ==
- Gurba, Myriam (2007). Dahlia Season. San Francisco: Manic D Press. ISBN 978-1-933149-16-5. OCLC 85862578.
- Gurba, Myriam (2015). Painting Their Portraits in Winter. San Francisco: Manic D Press. ISBN 978-1-933149-90-5. OCLC 911196713.
- Gurba, Myriam (2017). Mean. Minneapolis: Coffee House Press. ISBN 978-1-56689-491-3. OCLC 974677350.
- Gurba, Myriam (2023). Creep. New York: Simon & Schuster. ISBN 978-1-9821-8647-0. OCLC 1369678797.
- Gurba, Myriam (2025). Poppy State. Portland, Oregon: Timber Press. ISBN 978-1-64326-514-8. OCLC 1530055904.

== Reception ==
In 2019, O, The Oprah Magazine called Gurba's work Mean (2017) one of the "Best LGBTQ Books of All Time". In The New York Times, literary critic Parul Sehgal described Mean as a "scalding memoir" and Gurba as having a "distinct and infectious" voice.

The New York Times' Meghan Daum calls Mean one of the five best memoirs of 2017, writing "Gurba has a voice as distinct and infectious as any I've discovered in recent years. "Mean" contains the usual childhood confusions and adolescent humiliations, but it's also a meditation on race, class, sexuality and the limits of niceness."

New York Times' Parul Sehgal calls Mean "a scalding memoir that comes with a full accounting of the costs of survival, of being haunted by those you could not save and learning to live with their ghosts." It also "adds a necessary dimension to the discussion of the interplay of race, class and sexuality in sexual violence."

Reviews of Gurba's work have appeared in The Iowa Review, The Paris Review, The Lesbrary, Rain Taxi, BIG OTHER and Wing Chair Books. Joey Soloway, writing as Jill Soloway, blurbs for Mean, describing Gurba's voice as, "an alchemy of queer magic feminist wildness, and intersectional explosion." Michelle Tea reviews Mean as a book that mesmerizes with prose, stating that, "there is no other writer like Myriam Gurba and Mean is perfection."

Articles about her have appeared in KQED, The Edge LB and Confessions of a Boy Toy.

Interviews with the author have appeared in The Los Angeles Review of Books, Contemporary Women's Writing, OC Weekly, MOLAA, The Normal School, Weird Sister and Otherppl. Playlists for Gurba's writing appear in Largehearted Boy.

== Personal life ==
Gurba was born in Santa Maria, California, United States in 1977. She is queer and bisexual and as of 2016 lived in Long Beach, California.
