= Kat Rosenfield =

American novelist & columnist (1982– )

- Born: Kathryn Rosenfield; March 16, 1982 (age 44); Coxsackie, New York, U.S.
- Education: Drew University (BA)
- Occupations: Culture writer, columnist, novelist
- Years active: 2004–present
- Notable work: Full list
- Website: katrosenfield.com

Kathryn Rosenfield (born March 16, 1982) is an American culture writer, columnist, and novelist.

== Early life and education ==
Rosenfield was born and raised in Coxsackie, New York. She graduated from Coxsackie High School in 1999 and Drew University in 2003.

== Career ==
Beginning in 2004, Rosenfield worked in various communications jobs, including a publicist for Penguin Books, copywriter for the Brooklyn Public Library, and freelance writer for various magazines, newspapers, and corporate clients including New York magazine, The Boston Globe, Vulture, Wired, AirMail, and The New York Times. From 2010 to 2016, Rosenfield was a reporter for MTV News.

Rosenfield writes for Reason, UnHerd, and The Free Press. As a journalist, she has covered a number of controversies in book publishing, including sensitivity readers, the #ownvoices movement, and social media backlash to the young adult fiction novel The Black Witch. She is also a cohost with Phoebe Maltz Bovy of the podcast Feminine Chaos.

Rosenfield is a New York Times best selling author of adult and young adult thrillers. In 2019, her book A Trick of Light was released, which she co-wrote with comic book writer Stan Lee. In 2022, her book No One Will Miss Her (2021) was nominated for an Edgar Allan Poe Award for Best Novel.

== Personal life ==
Rosenfield married on September 6, 2008, and lives in Norwalk, Connecticut.

== Books ==
- How to Survive in the Woods (HarperCollins, 2026)
- You Must Remember This (William Morrow, 2023)
- No One Will Miss Her (William Morrow, 2021; nominated for Edgar Allan Poe Award for Best Novel)
- A Trick of Light (Mariner Books, 2019)
- Inland (Dutton Books for Young Readers, 2014)
- Amelia Anne Is Dead and Gone (Speak, 2012)
