= The Brick House Cooperative =

U.S. media cooperative

The Brick House is an American media cooperative. It was formed by nine writers, artists, and editors who came together in late 2020 to create a cooperatively-owned platform for expression, cultural preservation, library advocacy, and independent journalism. Originally incorporated in Ohio, it is now a California corporation governed by a cooperative operating agreement. The intent of the founders is that it should be independent of financial backers and commercial interests and hence of the influence of parties with agendas which differ from those of the contributors. The corporate structure is such that no entity outside the members of the cooperative can own an equity interest. It supports libraries through advocacy, publishing, and archival projects.

The cooperative was founded after their earlier project, a blockchain-based publishing platform called Civil, was disbanded in 2019.

The Brick House publishes Flaming Hydra, a subscription-based cooperative newsletter of about 70 independent writers.

== Founding and design ==
In late 2020, during the COVID-19 pandemic, Maria Bustillos (editor of Popula) and a few other editors, writers, and creators came together with eight individual publications to form The Brick House. The other core founders were Christina M. Greer, Alex Brook Lynn and Harry Siegel of FAQNYC, Myriam Gurba of Tasteful Rude, Brian Hioe of No Man is an Island, Mike Kanin and Sunny Sone of Preachy, Jason Adam Katzenstein of Awry, David Moore and Donald Shaw of Sludge,' Tom Scocca and Joe MacLeod of Indignity, and Kola Tubosun of OlongoAfrica. Each of the publications, with its own identity and management, was to operate in its own independent editorial direction, depending on The Brick House only to provide publishing infrastructure and hosting, and a home where joint projects, grant applications, and other administrative functions and ideas would be coordinated.

That year, they raised roughly $90,000 from 1,321 backers on Kickstarter. With this funding, along with a growing number of individual subscribers, The Brick House was able to pay each publication to do their work independently.

Over the years, the nine publications thinned down, and as of January 2025 The Brick House comprises only seven of the initial co-founders: Maria Bustillos, David Moore, Harry Siegel, Myriam Gurba, Brian Hioe, Tom Scocca, and Kola Tubosun.

== Notable projects ==
An African Abroad. In 2022, The Brick House helped raise funds to help in the re-publication of An African Abroad, a classic travel memoir by Olabisi Ajala, through OlongoAfrica.

BRIET. In 2023, Brick House founders David Moore and Maria Bustillos began building BRIET, a platform and service where independent publishers can list their digital books for permanent sale to libraries.

Flaming Hydra. In 2024, The Brick House founded Flaming Hydra, a subscription-based newsletter with 60 independent writers, artists, and publishers.
