= American Dirt =

Novel by Jeanine Cummins

- First edition cover
- Author: Jeanine Cummins
- Language: English
- Publisher: Flatiron Books
- Publication date: January 21, 2020
- Publication place: United States
- Media type: Hardcover, Kindle Edition, Audio CD
- Pages: 400 pages (hardcover)
- ISBN: 978-1250209764

American Dirt is a 2020 novel by American author Jeanine Cummins, published by Flatiron Books. The book is about a Mexican bookseller who is forced to flee as an undocumented immigrant to the United States, along with her son, after her journalist husband exposes a local drug kingpin. American Dirt was a New York Times best seller, selling over 3 million copies worldwide in 37 languages. It was selected for the TV series Oprah's Book Club and was on the longlist for the 2020 Prix Médicis étranger. It was also strongly criticized as being culturally exploitative, especially by Mexican-American authors.

== Plot ==
Lydia Quixano Pérez lives a comfortable life in Acapulco, Mexico, with her journalist husband, Sebastián, and her eight-year-old son, Luca. Lydia runs a bookstore and one day befriends a charming customer, Javier, who appears to have similar interests in books. However, Javier is revealed to be the kingpin of a drug cartel.

Sebastián publishes a profile exposing the crimes of Javier, who then orders the slaughter of Sebastián and his family. Lydia and Luca escape the massacre, but are forced to flee Mexico, and attempt to enter the United States illegally, taking a treacherous trip via the route known as La Bestia north of Mexico City.

== Production and marketing ==
The book was subject to a bidding war from publishers in 2018. The winner, Flatiron Books, paid Cummins a seven-figure advance. Flatiron engaged in a massive publicity campaign, including sending boxes of copies to libraries near the Mexican border, holding a release party, and obtaining blurbs from Stephen King, Sandra Cisneros, Don Winslow and John Grisham. On January 20, 2020, the day before the book's release, Oprah Winfrey announced that she had selected American Dirt for her book club.

American Dirt debuted at #1 on New York Times best seller list for the week of February 9, 2020.

== Reception ==
American Dirt remained on the New York Times Bestseller List for 36 weeks, and was one of the best-selling books of 2020. It has been published in 37 languages, and has sold over three million copies worldwide.

Oprah Winfrey, in selecting American Dirt for her book club, said, "Jeanine Cummins accomplished a remarkable feat, literally putting us in the shoes of migrants and making us feel their anguish and desperation to live in freedom." The book also received glowing reviews from Mexican-American writer Sandra Cisneros, who called it "the great novel of las Americas" and "the international story of our time" and Washington Post critic Polly Rosenwaike, who wrote that it "offers both a vital chronicle of contemporary Latin American migrant experience and a profoundly moving reading experience." NPR's Maureen Corrigan was equally positive, writing that "Cummins' novel brings to life the ordeal of individual migrants, who risk everything to try to cross into the U.S." Jacob M. Appel, in New York Journal of Books wrote, "American Dirt is going to be the defining book of 2020."

Myriam Gurba was one of the first reviewers to give a negative review. Originally requested by Ms. magazine, her review was considered too negative, and she instead posted it to the academic blog Tropics of Meta. She says of the protagonist, "That Lydia is so shocked by her own country’s day-to-day realities [...] gives the impression that Lydia might not be… a credible Mexican. In fact, she perceives her own country through the eyes of a pearl-clutching American tourist."

In a January 30, 2020 opinion piece in The Guardian, author and critic Daniel Olivas wrote: "American Dirt is an insult to Latinx writers who have toiled – some of us for decades – to little notice of major publishers and book reviewers, while building a vast collection of breathtaking, authentic literature often published by university and independent presses on shoestring budgets. And while the folks who run Flatiron Books have every right to pay seven figures to buy and publish a book like American Dirt, they have no immunity from bad reviews and valid criticism." He added, "it's not that we think only Latinx writers should write Latinx-themed books. No, this is not about censorship. A talented writer who does the hard work can create convincing, powerful works of literature about other cultures. That's called art. American Dirt is not art." Olivas concluded: "Perhaps American Dirt will be remembered not as a great novel, but as a key pivot-point for an industry that desperately needs to change."

A group of Latino writers formed a campaign and hashtag in response to the publication and initial mainstream praise of American Dirt called "#DignidadLiteraria" ("Literary Dignity"). On February 3, 2020, the group met with Macmillan, the owner of Flatiron Books, to demand greater representation of Latino writers under the publication house. Macmillan agreed to these terms. The group also demanded "investigation into discriminatory practices in the publishing industry at large."

USA Today's Barbara VanDenburgh called the book "problematic". She wrote, "American Dirt positions itself as the great sociopolitical novel of our era. Instead, it reeks of opportunism, substituting characters arc for mere trauma... These character, story and style missteps would be problematic no matter the source. But it matters in this case that the source is a European-born woman in the U.S. without ties to the Mexican migrant experience." VanDenburgh also criticized Cummins' choice to position the main character as "forced" to illegally cross the border "by an all-powerful villain" which, she argues, makes it easier for sheltered, white American readers to sympathize with the plot. VanDenburgh calls this construct "a cunning calculation, and also a deeply cynical one."

Unusually, The New York Times published two reviews of American Dirt. In a January 17, 2020, review in the daily "Books of the Times" section, Parul Sehgal panned the book, saying it had "stilted prose and characterizations", such as the book's description of the main character's facial expression as "as if seven fishermen have cast their hooks into her from different directions and they’re all pulling at once." Two days later, The New York Times Book Review published a review from Lauren Groff that said the book "was written with good intentions, and like all deeply felt books, it calls its imagined ghost into the reader's real flesh." Groff questioned herself in the review, writing, "I was sure I was the wrong person to review this book." On Twitter, soon after the review's publication, Groff stated that she "wrestled like a beast with this review".

Asked about American Dirt in 2023, Mexican screenwriter Guillermo Arriaga praised it, and said that neither he nor anyone he discussed it with in Mexico felt that the author was out of bounds.

== Marketing and controversy ==
Due to widespread criticism, several bookstores cancelled promotional appearances by Cummins. On January 29, 2020, Flatiron Books cancelled the entire tour, citing threats to Cummins. In the same statement, they apologized for using barbed wire decorations at the launch of the book. On February 10, 2020, Dignidad Literaria claimed that a statement made by Flatiron Books was tantamount to an admission that Cummins had not specifically received death threats.

That same day, 82 writers signed an open letter to Oprah Winfrey, calling the book "exploitative, oversimplified, and ill-informed", and asking her to rescind her endorsement. A further 60 writers endorsed the letter after publication. Signatories included Valeria Luiselli, Daniel Olivas, Tommy Orange, and Rebecca Solnit.

Winfrey nevertheless carried on with her show, with two one-hour episodes focused on both the content of American Dirt and the controversy surrounding it. She reiterated her own support for the book, and stated, "If one author, one artist is silenced, we're all in danger of the same. I believe that we can do this without having to cancel, to dismiss or to silence anyone." Participants on the show included Cummins, a panel of other writers, Macmillan Publishing president Don Weisberg, and Flatiron Books editor and publisher Amy Einhorn. According to The Washington Post, "Weisberg readily acknowledged that the industry is too white, and he said he and others are working hard to diversify his company. Einhorn said she loved American Dirt, but she took full responsibility for the clumsy and sometimes tasteless way the novel had been marketed."

At the end of 2020, numerous media outlets covered American Dirt in their end-of-year articles about publishing and the publishing industry. It was listed as one of the "Biggest Literary Scandals of 2020" in a HuffPost article written by culture and literary critic Claire Fallon. New York magazine's Vulture website referred to it as the most controversial book of the year.

== Film adaptation ==
The novel was optioned for a film adaptation by Charles Leavitt and Imperative Entertainment.

== Awards ==
- Longlist, 2020 Prix Médicis étranger
