= Blocked and Reported =

Podcast by Katie Herzog and Jesse Singal

- Genre: Internet culture
- Format: Audio
- Country of origin: United States
- Language: English

Cast and voices
- Hosted by: Katie Herzog; Jesse Singal

Publication
- Original release: March 24, 2020
- Updates: Weekly

Related
- Website: www.blockedandreported.org

Blocked and Reported is an American podcast created by journalists Jesse Singal and Katie Herzog. Launched in 2020, the podcast discusses recent controversies and internet culture from a heterodox liberal perspective.

== Background ==
Herzog and Singal are critical of cancel culture, identity politics, and what they see as a growing opposition to free speech among progressives; they have also been described as "liberal but woke-sceptic". Both hosts received approval and backlash and were accused of transphobia after writing articles on detransitioners, people who have ceased to identify as transgender.

Herzog is a former staff writer for the Seattle alternative weekly The Stranger, and has also written for The Free Press. In 2017, she wrote the feature article "The Detransitioners" in The Stranger, which she later called "the most-read thing I've ever written." After the article's publication, some Seattle residents sent Herzog hate mail or posted stickers calling her a transphobe; Herzog said that she lost friends and felt unwelcome in the city's lesbian community as a result.

Singal has written for publications including New York magazine, The New York Times, The Atlantic, and Reason. His 2018 cover story "When Children Say They're Trans" for The Atlantic was both praised and critiqued by parents of transgender children. Some transgender activists and journalists called the article transphobic or criticized it for focusing on subjects who no longer identified as transgender.

== Content ==
According to the Blocked and Reported website, Herzog and Singal "scour the internet for its craziest, silliest, most sociopathic content" in order to "extract kernels of meaning and humanity from a landscape of endless raging dumpster fires." Stories covered by Blocked and Reported include allegations of a toxic workplace environment at the Reply All podcast, the influence of Robin DiAngelo in the diversity training industry, the firing of Gina Carano from The Mandalorian, a Seattle Pride event that charged white attendees a "reparations fee", criticism of Chimamanda Ngozi Adichie for her views on transgender rights, and controversies in the young adult fiction community on Twitter.

The podcast was originally launched on Patreon in March 2020, but moved to Substack in October 2021 due to technical reasons and the hosts' concerns about Patreon's commitment to free speech.

Repeat guests at Blocked and Reported include Kat Rosenfield, Helen Lewis, and Mike Pesca. Other episodes have featured guests such as Musa al-Gharbi, Ana Kasparian, Hadley Freeman, and Dave Weigel.

== Reception ==
=== Critical response ===
Eric Zorn of the Chicago Tribune said that Blocked and Reported was one of his "new favorite podcasts" and that Herzog and Singal had "great podcast chemistry", though he cautioned that the hosts' "breezy banter and commitment to defending heterodox thinkers across the political spectrum will not appeal to everyone." George Fenwick, in Stuff, praised Singal and Herzog's "clever and accessible" analysis of internet controversies, calling the podcast a "balm" for the chaos of online arguments. The Times columnist James Marriott wrote that Blocked and Reported "provides exhaustive coverage of the latest culture wars scandals", with "a good-humoured, common-sense and often entertainingly exasperated perspective."

Elizabeth Nolan Brown of Reason said that Blocked and Reported "spares nothing in ridiculing online controversies around gender, sexism, racism, and other heated issues but avoids the pitfall of simply gawking at dumpster fires. It also doesn't let any political tribe off the hook." In The Spectator, Robert Jackman called the podcast "a safe space for conscientious liberals" who are skeptical of "the dangerous excesses of identity politics".

=== Subscriptions and revenue ===
As of June 2020, Blocked and Reported had over 1,400 subscribers and was earning more than $8,000 monthly. By May 2021, this figure had risen to more than 5,000 subscribers. In February 2023, Press Gazette placed Blocked and Reported among the top 27 highest-earning Substack newsletters, estimating that the podcast was earning at least $550,000 annually. As of March 2026, the podcast has over 82,000 subscribers.
