= Katie Herzog =

American journalist

Katie Herzog is an American journalist, who co-hosts the podcast Blocked and Reported with fellow reporter Jesse Singal.

As a former staff writer for the Seattle alternative weekly The Stranger, she wrote the feature article "The Detransitioners" in 2017, which she later called "the most-read thing I've ever written". After the article's publication, some Seattle residents sent Herzog hate mail or posted stickers calling her a transphobe; Herzog said that she lost friends and felt unwelcome in the city's lesbian community as a result.

In 2025, Herzog published the book Drink Your Way Sober: The Science-Based Method to Break Free from Alcohol. The book details her 20-year struggle with alcoholism and her discovery of the Sinclair Method to treat it.

She is the daughter of anthrozoologist Hal Herzog.
