= Georgia Security and Immigration Compliance Act =

The Georgia Security and Immigration Compliance Act requires that all public employers, contractors and subcontractors register and comply with the federal work authorization program operated by the United States Department of Homeland Security to verify new employee work eligibility.

== Enactment ==
On April 17, 2006, The Georgia Security and Immigration Compliance Act (GSICA) was authored by Georgia State Senator Chip Rogers, carried in the House by Georgia State Representative John Lunsford and signed into law by Georgia Governor Sonny Perdue. The Law later took effect on July 1, 2007.

== Provisions and legislative intent ==
The GSICA required that all public employers, contractors and subcontractors register and comply with the federal work authorization program operated by the United States Department of Homeland Security to verify new employee work eligibility.

The GSICA was created in an effort to address illegal immigration problems in the following areas: private employment, public employment and contracting, public safety, and public benefits.

It prevents any business from claiming certain wages paid to unauthorized employees as permissible business expense for state income tax purposes. The law requires citizenship verification for individuals older than the age of 18 who are receiving local, state, or federal benefits. In addition, authorities are obligated to verify the immigration status of any foreign national who receives jail time for a felony or DUI. If found to be in the country illegally authorities are to report unauthorized individuals to the Department of Homeland Security. The GSICA also provides modifications to the criminal code making it a felony to participate in or be affiliated with the trafficking of individuals for labor or sexual slavery.

== Major features of The Georgia Security and Immigration ==
I. Citizenship Verification

Requires that all individuals receiving benefits from the state sign either an affidavit stating that they are a citizen of the United States or a legal alien.

II. Employee Verification

Requires all public employers, contractors and subcontractors to verify new employee information by entering it into the federal database, also referred to as the Federal Basic Pilot Program.

III. Tax Benefit Prohibitions

Annual wages of over $600 a year from undocumented employees are prohibited from being claimed as an allowable business expense for state income tax purposes.

IV. Tax Withholding Requirement

Excluding federal tax withholding, a 6 percent state withholding tax is required for 1099 employees who fail to do the following: provide a taxpayer identification number, provide a correct taxpayer identification number, or provide a nonresident taxpayer identification.

V. Law Enforcement

Authorities are responsible for enforcing federal immigration and customs laws to those found not to be in the country legally.

VI. Human Trafficking

If found guilty of human trafficking or contributing, a felony punishable by 1–20 years imprisonment or 10–20 years for victims under age 18 will be enforced.

VII. Citizenship Verification for Individuals Charged with Felony or DUI

Requires that the legal status of individuals charged with a felony or DUI be verified to prove U.S. citizenship. If an individual is proven to be an illegal resident notification to Immigration and Customs Enforcement is required.

VIII. Immigration Assistance

Non-attorneys in the business of providing assistance to immigrants are required to post signs stating that they are not allowed to give legal advice and are not lawyers.

== Background on Local Immigration Enforcement ==
The power to regulate immigration has been thought to be exclusively federal, however, states and localities have played a role as well in the regulation of immigration. In the twentieth century states have exercised their right to enforce restrictions on the access immigrants have regarding state benefits such as welfare as well as public employment restrictions that were placed on employers who hired unauthorized workers. State and local efforts that have been made to prohibit employers from hiring unauthorized workers have two key historical features in common: First, it is declared unlawful to knowingly recruit, hire for employment, or continue to employ any individual who is an illegal worker. Second, employers are required to enter all employee information in the federal government's E-Verify program.

Historically, state and local governments have sought to enter cooperative agreements with the federal government that would allow local law enforcement authorities to enforce federal immigration law directly. Laws have also been passed requiring police to report the immigration status of those arrested or detained for serious crimes. When public officials, including police, become involved in immigration enforcement, law enforcement is then compromised. The question then becomes whether or not the state and local police have been awarded inherent constitutional authority authorizing the arrest of immigrants who are in violation of federal immigration law.

In 1996 Congress amended the Immigration and Nationality Act adding Sec. 287(g) which gave authorization to state and localities to enter into agreements with the federal government that would give state and local officials authority to arrest and detain individuals accused of violating federal immigration laws. States and localities that agreed with this addition to the Immigration and Nationality Act received special training and required supervision by Immigration and Customs Enforcement.

There is a history of problems associated with the federal government entering agreements with state and local law enforcement agencies that give them permission to identify individuals who are in the country illegally. Both legal and illegal immigrants are susceptible to exploitation by the power given to law enforcement to exercise the Immigration and Customs Enforcement (ICE). In fiscal years 2006–2008, ICE received about $60 million to train, supervise, and equip program participants. As of October 2008, ICE reported enrolling 67 agencies and training 951 state and local law enforcement officers. The ICE has created some management controls that allow it to govern Sec 287(g) that are in some ways flawed and limited. The program lacks documented objectives which allows for inconsistency in its practice, and it also requires supervision but does not describe the nature and extend of that supervision. This allows for local law enforcement to act on instinct and personal prejudices without fear of consequence, which has led to community fears of racial profiling and intimidation. State and local participation in immigration enforcement have raised policy concerns. It creates policy dangers such as the risk of racial profiling by employers and police which directly affect immigrants and surrounding communities.
