= Jeanine Cummins =

American author

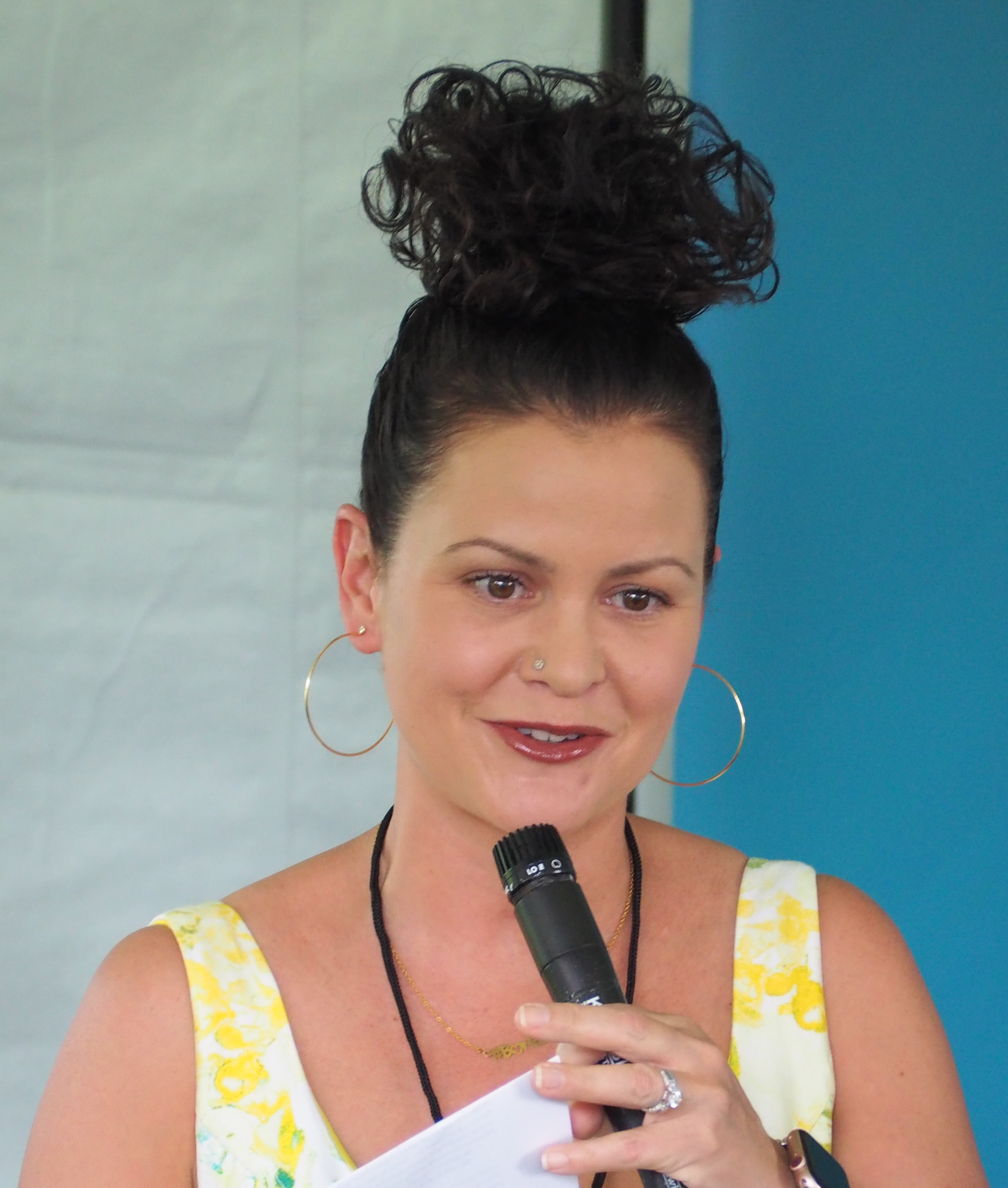
- Cummins in 2022
- Born: December 6, 1974 (age 51); Rota, Andalusia, Spain
- Occupation: Novelist
- Website: jeaninecummins.com

Jeanine Cummins (born December 6, 1974) is an American author of Irish and Puerto Rican heritage. She has written five books: a memoir titled A Rip in Heaven and four novels, The Outside Boy, The Crooked Branch, American Dirt, and Speak to Me of Home. American Dirt was a notable success, selling over 3 million copies in 37 languages. However, it also gained controversy within the American literary community for its perceived cultural exploitation.

== Early life ==
Cummins was born in Rota, Spain, where her father, Gene, was stationed as a member of the US Navy. Her mother, Kay, was a nurse. Cummins spent her childhood in Gaithersburg, Maryland and attended Towson University, where she majored in English and communications. In 1993 Cummins was a finalist in the Rose of Tralee festival, an international event that is celebrated among Irish communities all over the world; at each festival in Tralee, Ireland, a woman is crowned the Rose.

== Career ==
After university, Cummins spent two years working as a bartender in Belfast, Northern Ireland, before moving back to the United States in 1997 and beginning work at Penguin in New York City. She worked in the publishing industry for 10 years.

Her 2004 memoir, A Rip in Heaven, focuses on the attempted murder of her brother, Tom, and the murder of two of her cousins on the Chain of Rocks Bridge in St. Louis, Missouri, in 1991, when Cummins was 16. She declined offers for film rights to the book. She has said that her cousin Julie's death specifically inspired her to become a writer, as Julie had been "a really gifted writer" and Cummins's role model growing up, and Cummins felt a sense of responsibility to carry on her legacy.

Her next two books were novels that explore Irish history. The Outside Boy (2010) is about Pavee travellers. The Crooked Branch (2013) is about the Great Famine of Ireland. These books were published for the first time in Ireland in 2020.

Cummins' 2020 novel, American Dirt, tells the story of a mother and bookstore owner in Acapulco, Mexico, who attempts to escape to the United States with her son after her husband and her entire family is killed by a drug cartel. In 2018 the book was sold to Flatiron after a three-day bidding war between nine publishers that resulted in a seven-figure deal. From 2018 until its publication in January 2020, the book was heavily marketed, receiving many positive reviews and a coveted book release day endorsement by Oprah Winfrey as the 83rd book chosen for Oprah's Book Club. The novel eventually sold over 3 million copies, in 37 languages.

Approximately one month prior to release of the book, a negative review from Latina author Myriam Gurba was published online. Then, a week before release of the book, a string of critical reviews was published, including a review in The New York Times. In these reviews and a letter signed by 142 writers, Cummins was accused of exploitation and inaccuracy in her portrayals of both Mexicans and the migrant experience. Some also claimed that Cummins had previously identified as white but re-branded herself as Latina with the publication of the book, pointing to a line in a 2015 New York Times op-ed in which Cummins stated "I am white." Most did not refer to the entire statement in the op-ed, however, which was about the murder of Cummins's cousins by a group of three black and one white men and included the line "I am white. The grandmother I shared with Julie and Robin was Puerto Rican, and their father is half Lebanese. But in every practical way, my family is mostly white." In later interviews, Cummins has stated that, in the context of this event, it was important for her to indicate that her family is white, and that "in no way does that preclude me being Porto Rican." The controversy around Jeanine's book was used to launch the organization and hashtag #DignidadLiteraria to highlight and address a perceived lack of diversity in the U.S. publishing industry.

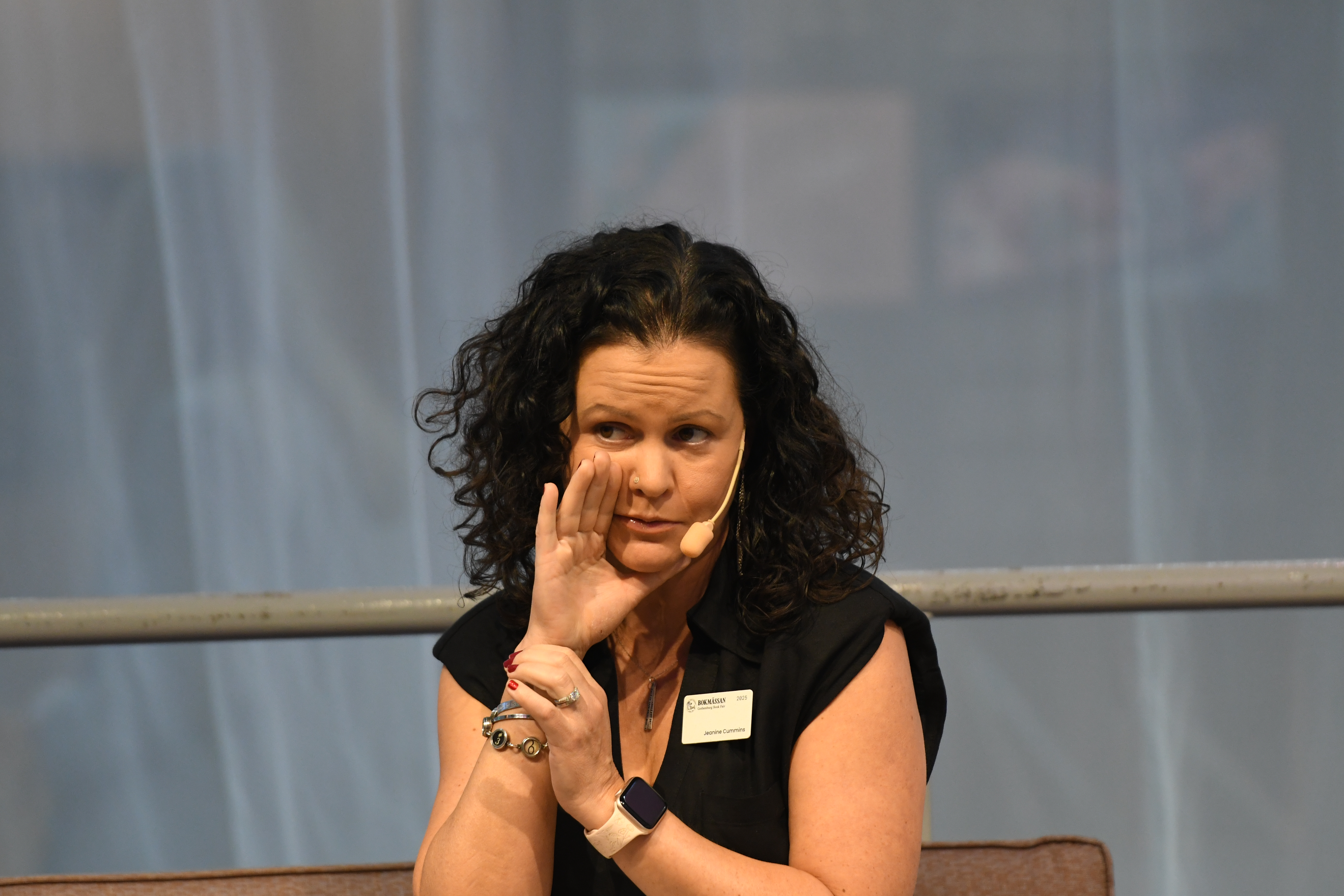
Cummins at the Gothenburg Book Fair in 2025.

On January 30, 2020, Cummins' book tour was cancelled. Flatiron Books' President Bob Miller wrote, "Based on specific threats to booksellers and the author, we believe there exists real peril to their safety." The publisher later clarified that these were not death threats, but rather other threats made against Cummins, against booksellers hosting her, and against moderators participating in the events.

In 2025, she published a new novel, Speak to Me of Home, celebrating her Puerto Rican and Irish heritage, which is described as "a tale of mothers and daughters, love and loss...about the spoken and unspoken stories that can shape a family's sense of home and each person's sense of belonging."

== Family ==
Cummins' husband is an Irish immigrant who lived illegally in the U.S. for 10 years. The couple have two daughters, and have also been foster parents.

== Works ==
- A Rip in Heaven: A Memoir of Murder and Its Aftermath (Berkley, 2004), ISBN 978-0451210531
- The Outside Boy (Berkley, 2010), ISBN 978-0451229489
- The Crooked Branch (Berkley, 2013), ISBN 978-0451239242
- American Dirt (Flatiron, 2020), ISBN 978-1250209764
- Speak to Me of Home (Hachette, 2025), ISBN 978-1472288820
