= Roberto Lovato =

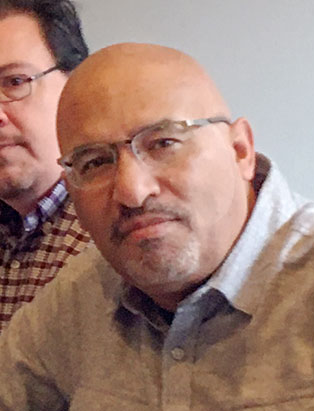
- Lovato in 2020
- Occupations: Journalist, Writer
- Writing career
- Subjects: Politics, Immigration, Latinos, United States foreign policy in Latin America
- Website: www.robertolovato.com

Roberto Lovato is an American writer and professor. He was a visiting scholar at U.C. Berkeley's Center for Latino Policy Research for three years. Lovato has also received a grant from the Pulitzer Center on Crisis Reporting. His journalistic work spans the entire hemisphere and centers on immigration, the war on drugs, national security, and climate change. His work also explores the links between the online and offline worlds and between storytelling and social movements.

His first book, the memoir, Unforgetting: A Memoir of Family, Migration, Gangs, and Revolution in the Americas, was published in September 2020 from HarperCollins. Publishers Weekly reported it "Mixing fraught reminiscence with vivid reportage."
