= Parul Sehgal =

American literary critic (born c. 1981)

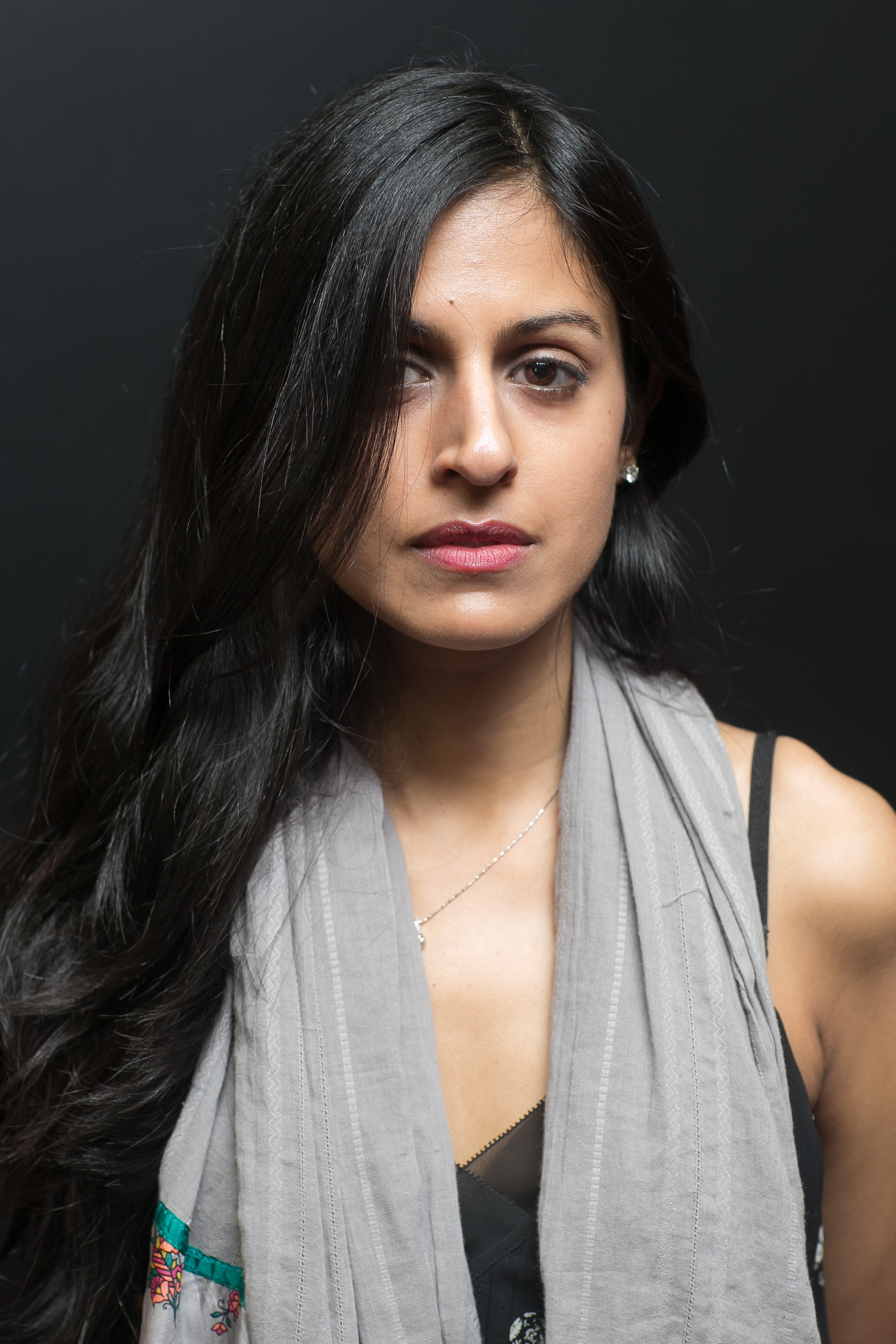
- Sehgal at the 2015 PEN Literary Awards ceremony
- Born: 1981 (age 44–45); Northern Virginia, U.S.
- Occupations: Book critic, teacher

Parul Sehgal (born c. 1981) is an American literary critic. She worked as an editor at NPR and The New York Times Book Review, and later was one of the book critics at the New York Times. She was a staff writer at The New Yorker from 2021 to 2024. In November 2024, she returned to the New York Times as critic-at-large.

== Early life and education ==
Sehgal was born circa 1981 in Northern Virginia, near Washington, D.C. Her family moved frequently and, as a child she lived with her parents in Delhi, Manila, and Budapest before they returned to the United States and Northern Virginia. Her parents and their families had become refugees during the Partition of India, migrating south into what is now India. Her father was born in Shimla where his family stopped on the way to Punjab. Her mother's family settled in Amritsar and Delhi.

Sehgal studied political science as an undergraduate at McGill University in Montreal. After graduating, she moved to Delhi, where she had extended family, to work at an NGO. Deciding to change fields, Sehgal entered graduate school after returning to the US, and earned an MFA from Columbia University. She has said this was the beginning of her creative writing.

== Career ==
Sehgal settled in New York City to pursue her interest in literature and criticism. She moved up to becoming books editor for NPR, and a senior editor at Publishers Weekly. In 2012, she became an editor at The New York Times Book Review.

In July 2017, Sehgal joined the team of book critics established at The New York Times after the retirement of Michiko Kakutani, and served into 2021. In 2021, she left to become a staff writer at The New Yorker. In 2024, the New York Times announced that Sehgal was returning to the paper as a critic-at-large for their "Ideas" initiative, a weekly showcase of "ideas journalism" for the paper that began in summer 2024.

Sehgal teaches in the graduate creative writing program at New York University.

== Awards and recognition ==
Sehgal received the 2010 National Book Critics Circle's Nona Balakian Citation for Excellence in Reviewing. She won the 2008 Pan African Literary Forum's OneWorld Prize. In 2021, she was recognized for her criticism by the New York Press Club.

In 2023, Sehgal won the Silvers Prize for Literary Criticism. The judges wrote: "She exemplifies the virtues of subtlety, surprise, and above all, pleasure...from the smallest of units—the word, the phrase—to the largest: character, perspective, revelation."

In 2025, three of her articles that appeared in The New Yorker—namely "Divorce Story," "The Mystery of Pain," and "Origin Story"—won the National Magazine Award for Reviews and Criticism from the American Society of Magazine Editors (ASME).

== Personal life ==
In November 2017, Sehgal said she was married and had a child.
