= Jesse Singal =

American journalist (born 1983)

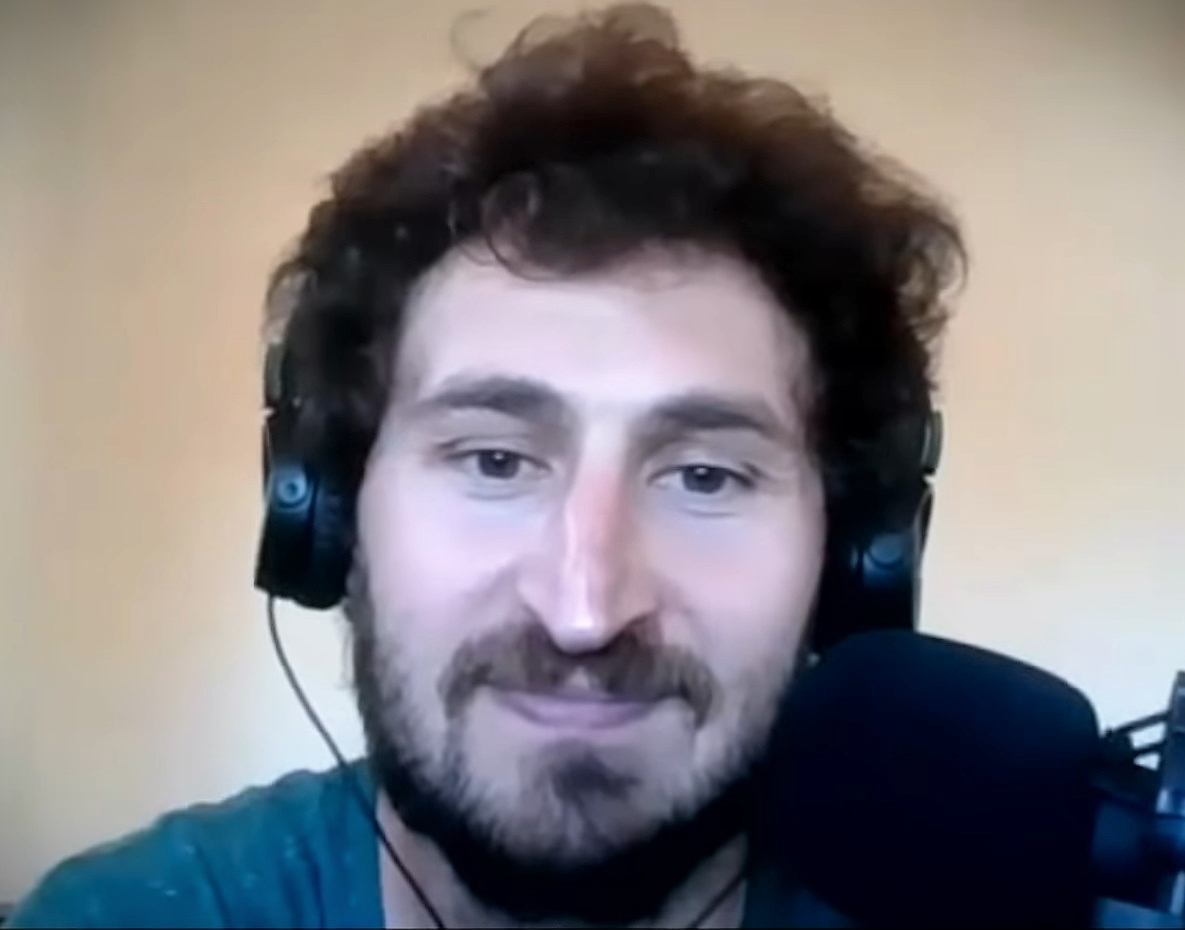
- Singal in 2021
- Born: 1983 (age 42–43)
- Education: Brandeis University; University of Michigan (BA); Princeton University (MPA)
- Notable work: Blocked and Reported

Jesse Singal (born 1983) is an American journalist. He has written for publications including New York magazine, The New York Times and The Atlantic. Singal also publishes a newsletter and hosts the podcast Blocked and Reported with journalist Katie Herzog.

Much of Singal's writing deals with the social sciences, and he previously edited New York magazine's behavioral-science vertical, "Science of Us". In 2021, he published a book, The Quick Fix, about the failings of popular psychology. Singal's writing on transgender issues has attracted controversy, particularly in his 2018 cover story for The Atlantic, "When Children Say They're Trans".

Singal's political orientation has been described as liberal but "heterodox", though he has expressed an aversion to the latter term as a descriptor of his work.

== Biography ==
Singal was born in 1983. He is one of three sons born to Sydney L. (née Altman; 1949–2021) and Bruce A. Singal. Both of his parents were attorneys. He attended Brandeis University for two years before transferring to the University of Michigan, and wrote for student newspapers at both institutions. He received a master's degree in public affairs from Princeton's Woodrow Wilson School of Public and International Affairs. He is of Jewish descent and lives in Brooklyn.

== Writing about transgender issues ==
Singal's writing about transgender healthcare for youth has been controversial. He claims to highlight uncertainties in the state of healthcare while critics say he misrepresents evidence. A 2024 report in The BMJ called him "one of the first American journalists to expose the potential harms of youth gender treatment" and sociologist Rogers Brubaker wrote Singal's work has been "key in bringing aspects of the emerging youth gender medicine critique to broader public attention" In a 2016 article for The Cut, Singal supported Canadian sexologist Kenneth Zucker, proponent of conversion therapy, describing the designation as a "show trial" undertaken to appease activists.

=== 2018 Atlantic article ===
Singal wrote the cover story for the July/August 2018 issue of The Atlantic. Originally published under the title "When a Child Says She's Trans", the online version was later retitled "When Children Say They're Trans". The long-form piece includes profiles of several adolescents who identify or previously identified as transgender, interviews with youth gender clinicians, and reviews of some of the studies, statistics, and protocols related to youth transition. Among the controversial aspects of the article was the proportion of weight given to stories of adolescents who had desisted or detransitioned—that is, reverted to identifying with their genders assigned at birth, either before or after undergoing physical transition. In the article, Singal acknowledges that the stories of detransitioners are sometimes viewed with skepticism or suspicion by the transgender community, in part because they have been used by conservative media to further misleading narratives.

Alexandria Neason, writing for the Columbia Journalism Review, stated that despite being fact-checked, the story was considered transphobic by many readers, journalists, and activists in the transgender community, and suggested that more diversity in editorial oversight could have averted the problem. In ThinkProgress, Zack Ford called the article "a loud dog whistle for anti-transgender parents" with "lopsided perspectives and [a] dearth of citations". In The Advocate, Amanda Kerri criticized his understanding of the issue and lack of expertise in the subject matter, while acknowledging "a legitimate concern about the politicization of science and social justice". Alex Barasch, writing in Slate, faulted the article for not including the story of "a single happy, well-adjusted trans teen" in its first 9,000 words and for not including stories of individuals who had detransitioned for reasons other than a realization that they were not trans, such as social stigma.

In the New York Times, Andrea Long Chu described the article's focus on detransitioners as "compassion-mongering" and "peddling bigotry in the guise of sympathetic concern". In a 2019 paper, Chu calls the article "mostly a heaping pile of garbage", but writes that "a few of the questions [Singal] raises about trans kids are important", and that his article had been "quickly brushed aside" on release with the "easy out" of dismissing him as a cisgender transphobe.

The Atlantic published four letters from parents of transgender children reacting to Singal's article. One said it "goes a long way to covering all aspects of [being transgender]. It's very impressive". Others described it as "simply unhelpful and largely harmful to a marginalized community", and playing on the worst fears of parents. The Atlantic also published responses to the article, including a personal account by Evan Urquhart of his own "late" transition. Urquhart expressed concern that Singal's piece might lead parents to doubt their transgender children's identities rather than better understand their needs. Another response, by sociologist Tey Meadow, criticized Singal's focus on a 16 year-old girl whose gender dysphoria had abated without transition, an outcome that Meadow writes represents "the rarest of cases", and that Singal had participated "in an inherently stigmatizing discourse" in characterizing the girl as a "desister".

Legal scholar John Inazu characterized the backlash as "widespread outrage from progressive commentators" and that in some criticisms, "ad hominem attacks far outpaced their substantive critiques".

=== Subsequent events ===
In March 2021, Singal was listed on GLAAD's "Accountability Project", which the organization described as serving to document "anti-LGBTQ words and actions from politicians, commentators, organization leaders, journalists and other public figures". In addition to the Atlantic cover story, GLAAD criticizes Singal for misinterpreting a study on desistance among transgender children and for promoting unsupported hypotheses that sexual trauma can cause gender dysphoria and that gender dysphoria can spread via social contagion. Singal responded, stating that his inclusion on the list was based on "previously disproven internet scuttlebutt". Sex columnist and gay rights activist Dan Savage criticized the listing, calling Singal's inclusion on the list "bullshit" and defamatory. Mey Rude criticized Savage in The Advocate: "Why do white cis gay men (and white cis lesbians like Katie Herzog) think that they get to be the experts on what is and what isn't transphobic?" Asked in an interview later that year about his defense of Singal, Savage said "It just felt unfair for him to be on that list with Tony Perkins and exterminationist, eliminationist homophobes, and transphobes."

In December 2024, Singal joined the social network Bluesky. Within 12 days of joining, he became the most blocked account on the platform (later surpassed by JD Vance) and faced a petition calling for his account to be banned. Singal reported receiving death threats from users, and some users allege he engaged or encouraged harassment of them, but Bluesky found no evidence he violated guidelines. In his coverage of the story, journalist Ben Smith called Singal's views "well within the mainstream of US and UK politics".

== Podcast ==
Since March 2020, Singal has hosted the podcast Blocked and Reported with Katie Herzog, a journalist based in Washington state. The podcast's content focuses on internet controversies. Herzog and Singal have both been described as politically liberal, "heterodox" and "woke-skeptic." Herzog was also the subject of online ostracism (characterized in The New York Times as an attempted cancellation) as a result of a controversial 2017 article she wrote for Seattle weekly The Stranger about people who have undergone detransition.

Within three months of the podcast's debut, it had more than 1,400 financial supporters through Patreon, collectively paying more than $8,000 per month. As of July 2021, this had increased to approximately 5,600 patrons and $37,000 per month. In October 2021, the podcast's website hosting and patronage services were migrated to Substack, where it has over 82,000 subscribers as of March 2026.

== The Quick Fix ==
Singal's first book, The Quick Fix: Why Fad Psychology Can't Cure Our Social Ills, was published in April 2021. It examines a number of popular psychology fads, such as positive psychology, power posing, and the implicit-association test which, according to Singal, turned out to have weak empirical support or reproducibility, or which were exaggerated into stronger claims that are "scientifically questionable but sexy and exciting". The book examines the replication crisis in social sciences and some of its underlying causes, such as p-hacking, and suggests remedies for "how both individuals and institutions can do a better job of resisting" exaggerated pop psychology.

Psychologist Benjamin Lovett in the American Journal of Psychology called it an excellent book, and a "valuable contribution" to ongoing conversations on the replication crisis and open science. Writing for National Review, Michael M. Rosen called the book "engaging and persuasive" and said that it was based on "rigorous research and thoughtful interviews". An anonymous review in Publishers Weekly called the book "impassioned yet disappointing", complaining that its presentation of scientific details was too convoluted for lay readers.
