= Diversity in young adult fiction =

Aspect of youth literature

In the United States, young adult fiction and children's literature in general have historically shown a lack of identity diversity, that is, a lack of books with a main character who is, for example, a person of color, from the LGBTQIA+ community, or disabled. The number of children's book authors has shown a similar lack of diversity. In the mid-2010s, more attention was drawn to this problem from various quarters. In the several years following, diversity numbers seem to have improved: One survey showed that in 2017, a quarter of children's books were about minority protagonists, almost a 10 percent increase from 2016.

== History of diversity in YA ==
One of the foundational elements of young adult literature is its representation of diverse ideas, particularly in conjunction with sociopolitical changes of that time. In both the United States and the United Kingdom, for example, bestselling youth novels including those from the late 2010s The New York Times bestseller list demonstrates the selling power of diverse narratives. This dedication to and emphasis on diversity became increasingly mainstream starting from the 20th century.

=== Pre-1980s era young adult ===
For a large portion of history, young adult fiction focused on cisgender, heterosexual, able-bodied characters and authors. In the 1920s and 1930s, "diverse" children's stories emphasized stereotypical characteristics of people of color. The 1940s sparked a change in the conversation surrounding black narratives. Those in black communities began demanding the publishing of books that actually depicted their lives. In 1965, Nancy Larrick published the article "The All-White World of Children's Publishing", which analyzed the literature and found that only 6.4 percent of the more than 5,000 books published for children between 1962 and 1964 featured children of color. A year later, the Council on Interracial Books for Children, which demanded that more books be published by people of color, was created.

Diversity in the pre-1980s era was not limited only to racial diversity. In 1969, John Donovan published I'll Get There. It Better be Worth the Trip, which was the first young adult novel to feature a gay teen. In 1979, Rosa Guy published Ruby, which became the first young adult novel featuring a lesbian woman of color.

=== 1980s to new millennium ===
The 1980s brought a greater awareness to the need for diverse youth literature. The population in the United States of America became much more diverse: the Hispanic population more than doubled and the population of races other than white or black increased exponentially. The publishing industry took notice of demographic changes and became more vocal about representation. In 1985, the Cooperative Children's Book Center (CCBC) began to track the percentage of books written by African American authors. That year, they reported that African Americans authored less than 1 percent of all children's books. In 1994, the organization began to track the number of Asian and Pacific Islander, Native and Latino authors as well. In their report, the CCBC found that, collectively, authors of color published about 9 percent of all books directed towards children and young adults. By the end of the millennium, that percentage dropped to 6.3 percent.

=== 2000s to present ===
The young adult market bloomed in the 2000s, largely in response to some high-profile, bestselling YA series (such as Twilight and The Hunger Games) and their subsequent film adaptations. In the late 1990s, only 3,000 young adult books were published annually. By 2010, that number increased to 30,000. While the number of diverse books has increased, the numbers are not reflective of the demographic breakdown in the United States and the United Kingdom. The statistics gathered by the CCBC and various other independent researchers show that the market does not reflect the diversity of the U.S. In 2013, less than 9 percent of best-selling novels featured characters with disabilities. In 2014 and 2015, found that 85 percent of all children's and young adult books feature white characters. This statistic has remained fairly stagnant since the 1960s. In 2017, a 20-year analysis of National Book Award winners between 1996 and 2015 found that only five of the novels were written by non-white authors.

In 2014, spurred by an all-white, all-male discussion at the 2014 BookCon festival, young adult author Ellen Oh created the Twitter hashtag #WeNeedDiverseBooks to protest the lack of diversity in young adult and children's literature. This movement developed into the nonprofit organization We Need Diverse Books (WNDB). WNDB's goal is to increase the representation of diverse communities within the world of children's books.

This movement changed the conversation surrounding diversity in YA and has influenced the number of diverse options on the market today. In the UK, 90 percent of the best-selling YA titles from 2006 to 2016 featured white, able-bodied, cisgender, and heterosexual main characters. During this period, 8 percent of all young adult authors published in the UK were people of colour. This number increased in the subsequent years. In the UK the proportion of authors of colour writing for young adults in the UK has more than doubled between 2017 and 2019. In 2017, 7.10 percent of YA authors were people of colour: this rose to 19.60 percent in 2019. Between 2007 and 2017 in the UK, fewer than 9 percent of children's books creators were people of colour. Authors of colour have proved to have commercial appeal, despite not being offered the same types of publishing deals and opportunities as their white counterparts: in the 2017–2019 period, women authors of colour and white women authors accounted for 30.75 percent each on the YA bestseller list in the UK, but 9.02 percent and 58.3 percent, respectively, of the overall publishing output. This means that despite there being around six times as many White women being published than women of colour, there are the same number of both groups in the bestseller list, In 2017, a quarter of children's novels from US publishers were about minority protagonists, almost a 10 percent increase from 2016.

== Importance of diversity ==
It is claimed that diversity encourages self-reflection among readers. This self-reflection creates a sense of comfort. People like to see themselves and identify with the stories they read. It is claimed that this is not possible when 85 percent of children's and young adult books feature white characters. By featuring multicultural characters experiencing real-life problems, readers can see that they are not alone. On the other hand, if diverse experiences are not visible, it further alienates disadvantaged minorities.

When a reader identifies with a minority or disadvantaged population, seeing characters that resembles their experiences can be empowering.

Diverse literature can also be a catalyst for acceptance. Portraying and reading about characters that are different from the reader helps to reduce stereotypes. These narratives alleviate the "otherness" and make the different seem less strange. Studies have found that reading about people from different cultures increases empathy. This is especially true in fantasy and science-fiction novels because readers are already immersed in a "different world". Being surrounded by diverse characters and cultures builds a "tolerance for and appreciation of" those cultures which helps to eliminate prejudice. With the increasingly diverse population and more diverse public schools, young adults constantly interact with people that are different than them.

== #ownvoices ==
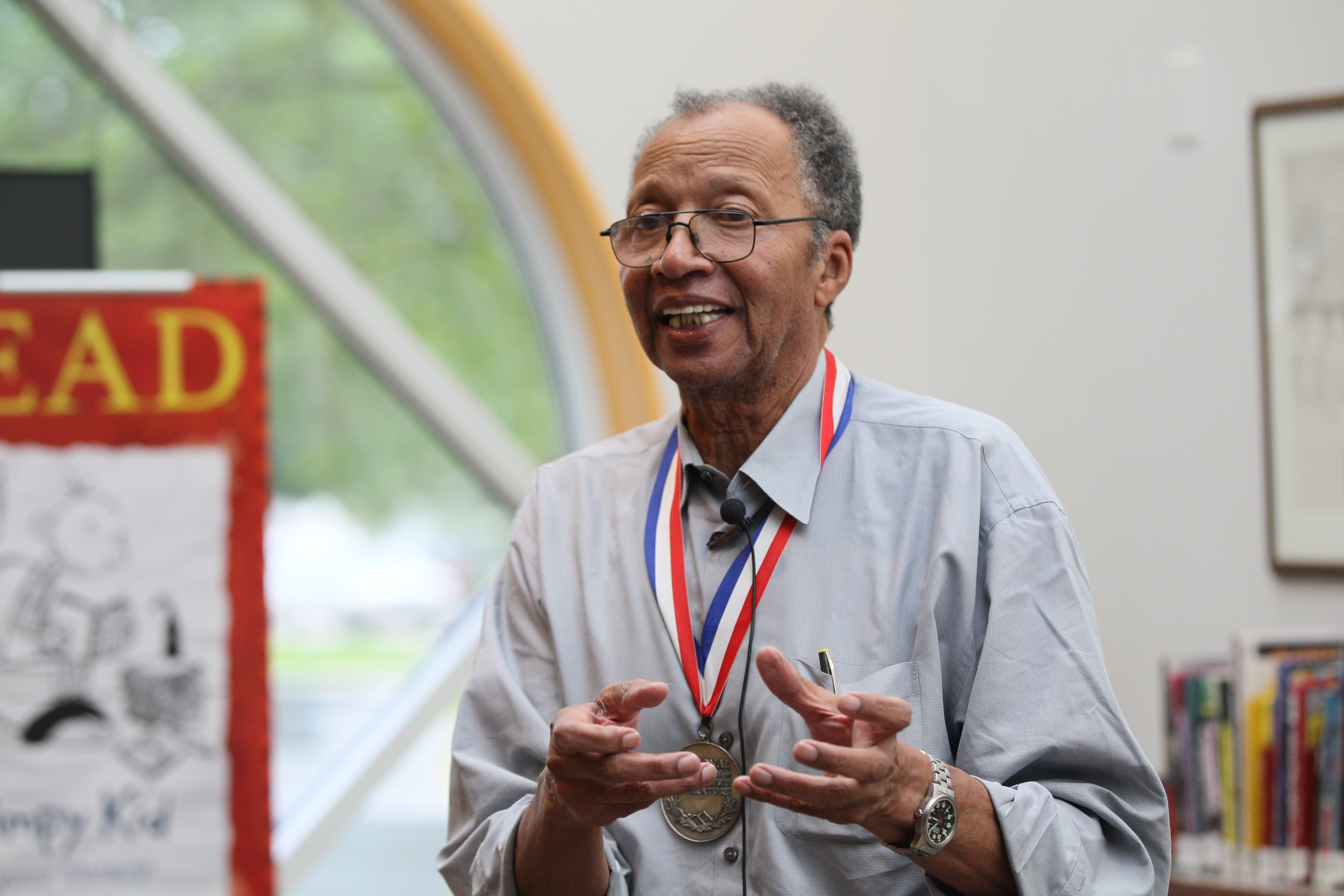
Walter Dean Myers speaks at the Powell Branch of the Kalamazoo Public Library, August 2013

The "#ownvoices" movement, which has spread beyond young adult, promotes books about diverse characters written by authors from the same diverse identity. It originated in September 2015 when author and co-founder of the website Disability in Kidlit Corinne Duyvis created the Twitter hashtag #ownvoices. Proponents of #ownvoices argue that minority voices have been misrepresented and stereotyped in the past, and a movement spotlighting stories by authors who are part of minority groups can help combat this.

In recent years, more authors of color are publishing novels, but there has been no significant increase in novels published by marginalized authors in the US. In the UK, there has been a notable increase, with the percentage of YA authors of color being published more than doubling over a 10-year-plus period.

Concern with the identity of authors is not a new concept. In 1986, Walter Dean Myers published I Actually Thought We Would Revolutionize the Industry, an article in The New York Times detailing how few black narratives were determined by black authors. In 1998, Jacqueline Woodson published Who Can Tell My Story in The Horn Book Magazine posing the same questions. In the article, Woodson said, "I realized that no one but me can tell my story."

== White-washing of book covers ==
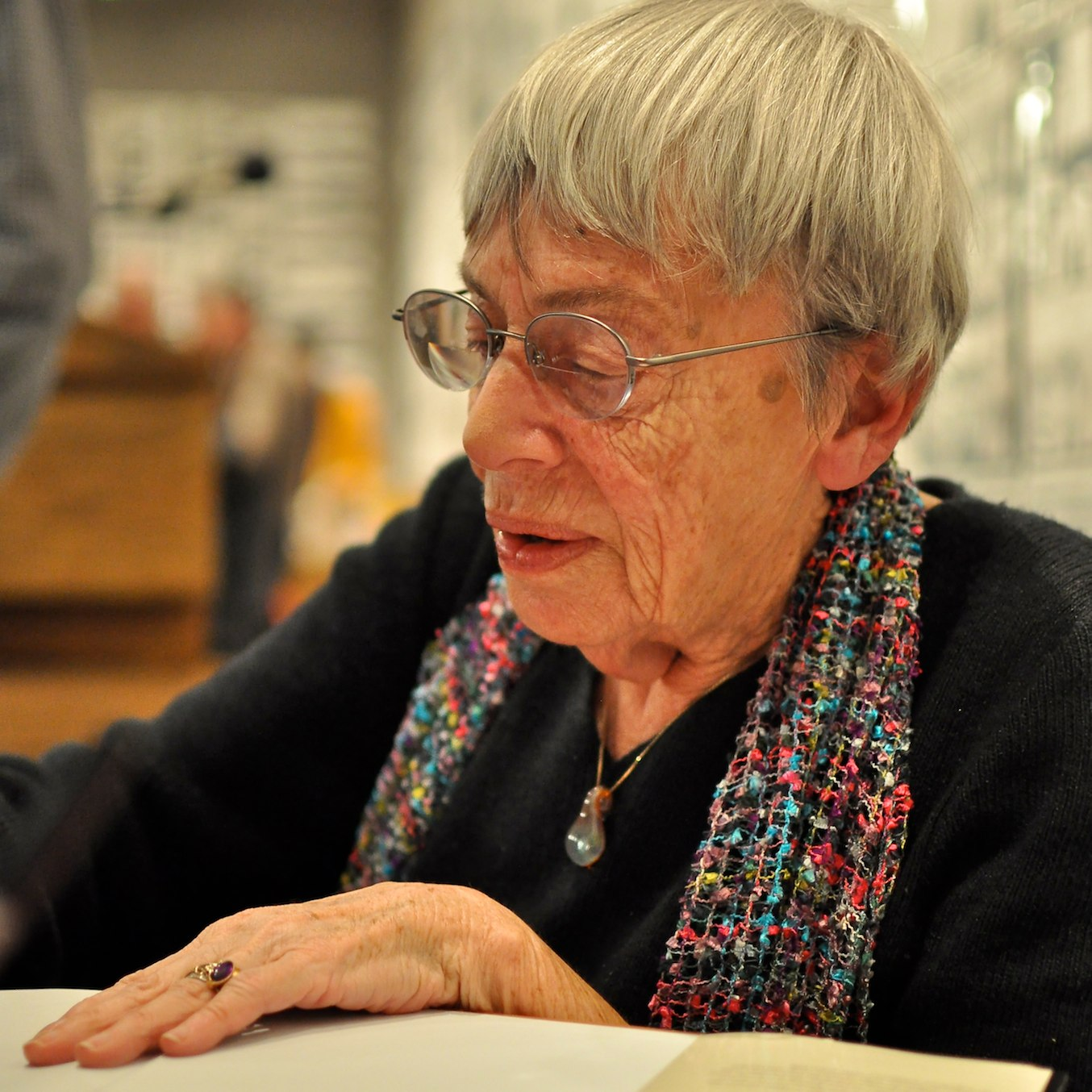
Ursula Le Guin signing a book in 2013

Publishing companies commonly distort the perception of diversity on book covers to conform to traditional standards based on the assumption that book covers with diverse character representations are less marketable than those with white, heterosexual, and able-bodied models, resulting in a white-washing effect. Typically either a white model represents a character of color or the character's image is distorted beyond complete recognition. Ursula Le Guin was a champion for dispelling the "white sells" phenomenon. In a 2001 interview, Le Guin attributed the frequent lack of character illustrations on her book covers to her choice of non-white protagonists. At the 2004 BookExpo America convention, she specifically criticized this practice, saying:

"Please consider that 'what sells' or 'doesn't sell' can be a self-fulfilling prophecy. If black kids, Hispanics, Indians both Eastern and Western don't buy fantasy – which they mostly don't – could it be because they never see themselves on the cover?"

A high-profile instance of white-washing in YA was Justine Larbalestier's 2009 novel Liar. In the novel, the protagonist is described as an African American, but the advance reading copy (ARC) featured a white cover model. The publisher remedied this after Larbalestier complained.
