= Julian Winters =

American novelist

- Occupation: Novelist
- Writing career
- Period: 2018 – present
- Genres: Romance, LGBTQ
- Website: http://julianwinters.com/

Julian Winters is an American author. His works include Running with Lions, How to Be Remy Cameron, The Summer of Everything, and I Think They Love You.

== Career ==
Winters' debut novel, Running with Lions, was published in 2018. It is a young adult novel about a high school soccer player who must confront his former friend, whom he has feelings for, at soccer camp. The book received a gold Benjamin Franklin award from the Independent Book Publishers Association.

His second novel, 2019's How to Be Remy Cameron, follows a gay and Black interracial adoptee who must confront his identity after being asked to write a paper on it for school. His other young adult novels include The Summer of Everything, As You Walk On By, and Right Where I Left You. In 2024, Winters published Prince of the Palisades, where the prince of the fictional African kingdom of Îles de la Réverie falls in love while at a boarding school in Los Angeles.

His first adult novel, I Think They Love You, was published in 2025. It follows the son of a retiring CEO who fake-dates his ex-boyfriend in hopes of proving himself responsible to his family and being chosen to assume his father's position. A sequel, Last First Kiss, was released in 2026.

In 2026, he published Find My Way Down To You, a young adult urban fantasy novel about a grieving boy who follows a psychopomp into the underworld, where he tries to reunite with his deceased boyfriend.

== Personal life ==
Winters is queer. He was formerly a management trainer. As of 2026, he lives near Atlanta.

== Publications ==
=== Young Adult Novels ===
- Running with Lions. Duet Books. June 7, 2018. ISBN 978-1945053627.
- How to Be Remy Cameron. Duet Books. September 10, 2019. ISBN 978-1945053801.
- The Summer of Everything. Duet Books. September 8, 2020. ISBN 978-1945053917.
- Right Where I Left You. Viking Books for Young Readers. March 15, 2022. ISBN 978-0593206478.
- As You Walk On By. Viking Books for Young Readers. January 17, 2023. ISBN 978-0593206508.
- Prince of the Palisades. Viking Books for Young Readers. August 20, 2024. ISBN 978-0593624425.
- I Think They Love You. St. Martin's Griffin. January 28, 2025. ISBN 978-1250326249.
- Last First Kiss. St. Martin's Griffin. January 27, 2026. ISBN 978-1250326263.
- Find My Way Down to You. Viking Books for Young Readers. August 4, 2026. ISBN 978-0593624456.
- Sweet Disaster. Delacorte Press. April 13, 2027. ISBN 979-8217029693.

=== Adult Novels ===
- I Think They Love You. St. Martin's Griffin. January 28, 2025. ISBN 978-1250326249.
- Last First Kiss. St. Martin's Griffin. January 27, 2026. ISBN 978-1250326263.

=== Anthology contributions ===
- Mitchell, Saundra, ed. (May 26, 2020). "Victory Lap". Out Now: Queer We Go Again!. Inkyard Press. ISBN 978-1335018267.
- Silverman, Laura, ed. (July 13, 2021). "Under Our Masks". Up All Night: 13 Stories between Sunset and Sunrise. Little, Brown Books for Young Readers. ISBN 978-1643750415.
- Mbalia, Kwame, ed. (August 3, 2021). "The Legendary Lawrence Cobbler". Black Boy Joy: 17 Stories Celebrating Black Boyhood. Delacorte Press. ISBN 978-0593379936.
- Blake, Ashley Herring; Podos, eds. (December 7, 2021). "What Makes Us Heroes". Fools in Love: Fresh Twists on Romantic Tales. Running Press Kids. ISBN 978-0762472345.
- Caldwell, Patrice, ed. (September 20, 2022). "Who Will Save Me". Eternally Yours. Viking Books for Young Readers. ISBN 978-0593206874.
- Strong, Karen, ed. (January 10, 2023). "Our Joy, Our Power". Cool. Awkward. Black. Viking Books for Young Readers. ISBN 978-0593525098.
- Hanna, Alkaf; Owen, Margaret, eds. (June 6, 2023). "1:00 P.M.: Xander Wilson, 15, Undecided". The Grimoire of Grave Fates. Delacorte Press. ISBN 978-0593427453.
- Córdova, Zoraida; Parker, Natalie C., eds. (September 26, 2023). "We'll Always Have June". Mermaids Never Drown: Tales to Dive. Feiwel & Friends. ISBN 978-1250823816.
- Azad, Nafiza; Melody, Simpson, eds. (August 20, 2024). "Coping with Imposter Syndrome". Writing in Color: Fourteen Writers on the Lessons We've Learned. Margaret K. McElderry Books. ISBN 978-1665925655.
