= L.L. McKinney =

American writer

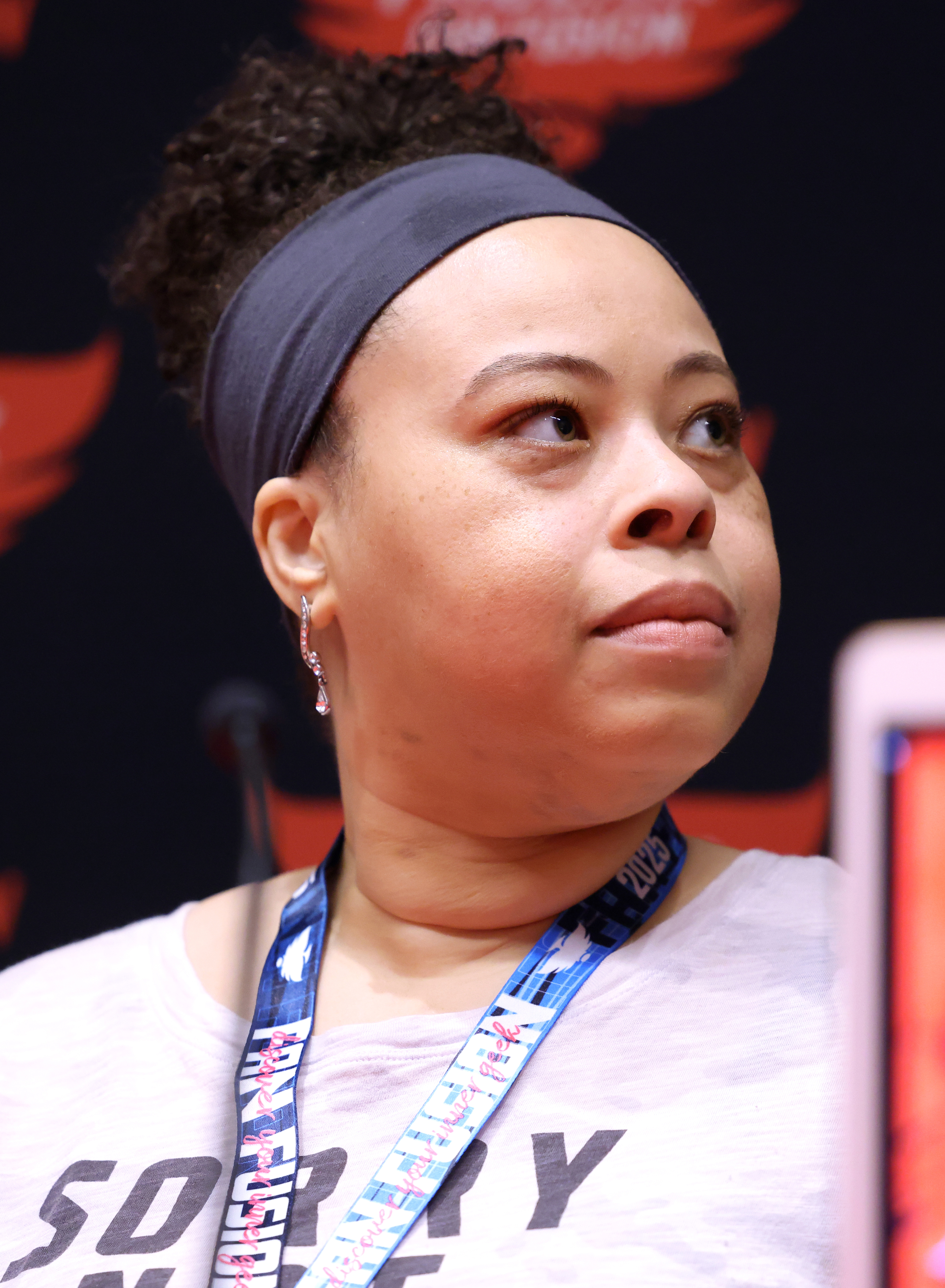
- McKinney in 2025
- Born: Leatrice McKinney; 1984 or 1985 (age 41–42)
- Other name: Elle McKinney
- Occupation: Writer
- Writing career
- Language: English
- Years active: 2018–present
- Genres: fantasy, science fiction
- Notable work: A Blade So Black
- Website: llmckinney.com

Leatrice "Elle" McKinney, better known by her pen name L.L. McKinney, is an American writer of young adult literature. Her debut novel, A Blade So Black, was released in September 2018. McKinney created the PublishingPaidMe Twitter hashtag in June 2020 to highlight racial disparities in writers' advance payments.

== Career ==
McKinney enjoyed reading and writing from childhood. She studied video game design in college and went on to work at Hallmark as a greeting card writer. She held the position after the publication of her first book.

McKinney published her debut novel A Blade So Black in fall 2018. The book is the first in the Nightmare-Verse series and is a contemporary retelling of Alice's Adventures in Wonderland with a Black teenage girl protagonist. The second in the series, A Dream So Dark was released in September 2019, and the third, A Crown So Cursed, is slated for 2023 release.

In May 2020 she announced her forthcoming YA novel and first graphic novel, Nubia: Real One. It is a coming-of-age story about a Black girl with superhuman strength, and is an iteration of the character Nubia who debuted in Wonder Woman in 1976 as the DC Universe's first Black woman superhero. The book was released by DC in February 2021.

== Twitter activity ==
McKinney is an active member of the YA Twitterverse. In early 2019 McKinney was one of several writers who used Twitter to criticize the planned publication of Blood Heir by Amélie Wen Zhao due to its treatment of the book's African American characters.

In February 2020, she used her account to protest Barnes & Noble's Diverse Edition collection, an initiative introduced for Black History Month featuring covers of classic books re-printed with people of color as the protagonists, including books like Frankenstein and Peter Pan. She referred to the campaign as "literary blackface" and recommended that the bookstore instead release classic Black literature with updated covers. The store cancelled the campaign in response to the criticism.

On June 6, 2020 McKinney created the hashtag #PublishingPaidMe for writers to share their advance payments from publishing contracts, and in particular to highlight racial disparities between Black and white writers. She developed the hashtag in concert with the worldwide protests related to institutional racism that took place after the murder of George Floyd. McKinney was inspired by a Tweet from YA author Tochi Onyebuchi asking writers to share advance information for the sake of transparency. A spreadsheet was also created based on survey data collected by McKinney through Twitter, which amounted to over 1,200 entries. The data showed that Black writers often receive far lower advances compared to white writers, even after winning major awards, such as N. K. Jemisin.

== Personal life ==
McKinney resides in Kansas City, Kansas.

== Works ==
- A Blade So Black. 2018. Imprint/Macmillan, publication date 25 September 2018. ISBN 9781250153890
- A Dream So Dark. 2019. Imprint/Macmillan, publication date 24 September 2019. ISBN 9781250153913
- Nubia: Real One. 2021. DC Comics, publication date 23 February 2021. ISBN 1401296408
- Nubia: Too Real. 2025. DC Comics, publication date 20 September 2025. ISBN 9781799500179
- "10:00-ish A.M. (Or earlier. Maybe later): SYDNEY MEEKS" in The Grimoire of Grave Fates, ed. by Hanna Alkaf and Margaret Owen (Ember, 2023)
- "Dear Diary" in Faeries Never Lie: Tales to Revel In, ed. by Zoraida Cordova and Natalie C. Parker

== Awards and nominations ==
- Nubia: Real One, DC Comics, 2021 - 2022 Ignyte Award Winner for Outstanding Comics Team
- Winner 2021 The Community Award for Outstanding Efforts in Service of Inclusion and Equitable Practice in Genre, presented by the Ignyte Awards, for #PublishingPaidMe, with Tochi Onyebuchi
