= Kwame Mbalia =

American young adult and middle-grade novelist

- Born: Kwame Mbalia; May 12, 1984 (age 42); Milwaukee, Wisconsin, U.S.
- Education: Howard University
- Occupations: Author; publisher
- Writing career
- Years active: 2019–present
- Genres: Young adult; fantasy; middle grade fiction
- Website: kwamembalia.com

Kwame Mbalia (born May 12, 1984) is an American author and publisher, best known for the bestselling Tristan Strong series, the first of which was a recipient of the 2020 Coretta Scott King Author Award and a Children's Africana Book Award Winner in Best Book for Older Readers. In 2024, he launched alongside Disney-Hyperion the publishing imprint, Freedom Fire, that focuses on middle-grade books and Black storytelling across the diaspora.

== Career ==
Prior to becoming a full-time writer, Mbalia worked as a pharmaceutical metrologist. He grew up in Milwaukee, Wisconsin, and now resides in Rolesville, North Carolina.

His Tristan Strong series are rooted in West African mythology and African-American folktales, published through Rick Riordan's imprint Rick Riordan Presents from 2019 to 2021, consisting of three novels. It follows the titular character who spends his summer on his grandparents' family farm in Alabama. Tristan grapples with survivor's guilt, where his friend Eddie was killed in a bus accident and left behind a journal that Tristan has never read. When Gum Baby (a doll created by Anansi) steals the journal at night, Tristan attempts to rescue it only to end up in the magical realm of Alke, met with legendary figures his family had told stories about. The series was adapted into graphic novels scripted by Robert Venditti and illustrated by Olivia Stephens.

His next series, Last Gate, was co-written with Prince Joel Makonnen. Venturing into the science fiction genre, it takes place in the hard-worn city of Addis Prime surrounded by scraps of technology. The first book, Last Gate of the Emperor, was released through Scholastic Press on May 4, 2021, and narrates Yared Heywat, a tween player of the augmented reality game The Hunt for Kaleb's Obelisk. Things go awry one day when his Uncle Moti disappears, and the stories Yared grew up listening to come to life. The follow-up book, The Royal Trials, was released on July 19, 2022.

Mbalia was editor of the middle-grade anthology Black Boy Joy, containing 17 stories, poems, and comics, with contributors including George M. Johnson, Jerry Craft, Tochi Onyebuchi, and Jason Reynolds. It was released through Delacorte Press on August 3, 2021, and appeared at number one on the children's middle grade hardcover bestseller list. Mbalia conceived the story during the George Floyd and Black Lives Matter protests of summer 2020, where the media often showed the trauma of and violence against Black boys, which was a reductive view of their full, authentic living experiences. He explained of its purpose: "I've always been interested in interrogating this idea of the emotions that we are allowed to show, as Black people and then as Black boys. What emotions are we allowed to show? What's approved? This idea of joy and grief have to go hand-in-hand. I can think of several situations in which we cry about something and then we start laughing in the midst of these tears. Yet when I was growing up, I felt that it was so hard to show or to see those emotions in real life." The anthology was named after the hashtag movement, Black Boy Joy, a term coined by Danielle Young for The Root in 2016 that actively resists the oft-portrayed stigmas, stereotypes, and pervasive traditional masculinity norms of young Black males in the media, and instead celebrates positivity and their boyhood.

In November 2022, it was announced of Mbalia becoming head of the new middle-grade imprint Freedom Fire at Disney-Hyperion. It was scheduled to premiere in Spring 2024, which focuses on acquiring stories from the Black diaspora. His 2024 book, Jax Freeman and the Phantom Shriek, was released through the imprint. Jackson "Jax" Freeman is sent to live with distant relatives but meets with sinister strangers at the train station, and finds himself to be a powerful summoner.

His first picture book, which was also his first venture into IP work, was Captain America: Brave New World: A Hero Looks Like You. It was illustrated by Nikkolas Smith and released on February 14, 2025, to coincide with Captain America: Brave New World. The plot depicts a young boy named DJ, who helps his favorite superhero Captain America.

He co-authored with Erin Entrada Kelly the young adult romantic comedy book, On Again, Awkward Again. It centers on freshman high school students Pacy Mercado and Cecil Holloway, who are attracted to one another but don't know how to express it, taking on ill advice from family, friends, and strangers online. The book was released by Abrams Books on April 15, 2025.

He wrote Star Wars: The Last Order, which follows former stormtroopers Finn and Jannah, who rise against the First Order. It was released on October 21, 2025.

== Bibliography ==
=== Tristan Strong series ===
- Tristan Strong Punches a Hole in the Sky (2019)
- Tristan Strong Destroys the World (2020)
- Tristan Strong Keeps Punching (2021)
- Tristan Strong Punches a Hole in the Sky: The Graphic Novel (2022)

=== Last Gate series ===
- Last Gate of the Emperor (2021; with Prince Joel Makonnen)
- The Royal Trials (2022; with Prince Joel Makonnen)

=== Jax Freeman series ===
- Jax Freeman and the Phantom Shriek (2024)
- Jax Freeman and the Tournament of Spirits (2025)

=== Standalone ===
- On Again, Awkward Again (2025; with Erin Entrada Kelly)
- Star Wars: The Last Order (2025)

=== Short stories ===
- "Liberia" (2020; from A Universe of Wishes: A We Need Diverse Books Anthology; ed. Dhonielle Clayton)
- "The Griot of Grover Street" (2021; from Black Boy Joy: An Anthology)
- "The Gum Baby Files" (2021; from The Cursed Carnival and Other Calamities; ed. Rick Riordan)
- "Self-Reflection" (2021; from Recognize!: An Anthology Honoring and Amplifying Black Life; ed. Wade Hudson and Cheryl Willis Hudson)
- Foreword (2023; from Long Distance: Pan-African Comics Anthology; ed. Beserat Debebe)
- "Honor Code" (2023; from Cool. Awkward. Black.; ed. Karen Strong)
- "4:00 A.M.: Jameson 'JB' Brig" (2023; from The Grimoire of Grave Fates; ed. Hanna Alkaf and Margaret Owen)
- "Fortuna Favors the Bold" (2023; from From a Certain Point of View: Return of the Jedi; ed. Elizabeth Schaefer)
- "Revelry" (2024; from Faeries Never Lie: Tales to Revel In; ed. Zoraida Córdova and Natalie C. Parker)

=== Essays ===
- "Optics" (2022; for Apex Magazine)
- "Special Guest: Eric Wilkerson" (2022; for Chicon 8: The 80th World Science Fiction Convention)

=== Picture books ===
- Captain America: Brave New World: A Hero Looks Like You (2025; illustrated by Nikkolas Smith)

== Awards and honors ==
Year	Organization	Nominated work	Category	Result	Ref.
2019	Cybils Awards	Tristan Strong Punches a Hole in the Sky	Elementary and Middle Grade	Won	
2020	Children's Africana Book Awards	Tristan Strong Punches a Hole in the Sky	Best Book for Older Readers	Won	
2020	Ignyte Awards	Tristan Strong Punches a Hole in the Sky	Best in Middle Grade	Won	
2020	Charlotte Huck Award	Tristan Strong Punches a Hole in the Sky	Recommended		
