= Reclaim the Stars =

2022 anthology edited by Zoraida Córdova

Reclaim the Stars: 17 Tales Across Realms & Space
- Editor: Zoraida Córdova
- Audio read by: Almarie Guerra
- Language: English
- Genre: Speculative fiction
- Publisher: Wednesday Books
- Publication date: 15 Feb 2022
- Pages: 432 (Hardcover)
- Awards: 2023 Ignyte Award for Outstanding Anthology/Collected Works
- ISBN: 9781250790637

Reclaim the Stars: 17 Tales Across Realms & Space is a 2022 anthology of young adult short stories edited by Zoraida Córdova. It collects stories written by writers of the Latin American diaspora. It received critical attention, winning the 2023 Ignyte Award for Outstanding Anthology/Collected Works.

== Contents ==
The anthology collects seventeen short stories.

1. "Reign of Diamonds" by Anna-Marie McLemore
2. "Flecha" by Daniel José Older
3. "The First Day of Us" by David Bowles
4. "The Tin Man" by Lilliam Rivera
5. "This Is Our Manifesto" by Mark Oshiro
6. "Creatures of Kings" by Circe Moskowitz
7. "Eterno" by J. C. Cervantes
8. "White Water, Blue Ocean" by Linda Raquel Nieves Pérez
9. "Leyenda: A Wolves of No World Story" by Romina Garber
10. "Color-Coded" by Maya Motayne
11. Magical Offerings" by Nina Moreno
12. "Rogue Enchantments" by Isabel Ibañez
13. "Sumaiko Y La Sirena" by Vita Ayala
14. "River People" by Yamile Saied Méndez
15. "Moonglow" by Sara Faring
16. "Killing El Chivo" by Claribel A. Ortega
17. "Tame the Wicked Night" by Zoraida Córdova

The stories are divided into three groups. The group "To the Stars" features stories with a science fiction element. The group "The Magical Now" contains stories set in the real world, or adjacent to it. These stories contain fantasy elements. The group "Other Times, Other Realms" comprises stories set in secondary worlds.

== Reception and awards ==
Publishers Weekly gave the anthology a starred review. The review called it a "magnetic and artfully curated SFF anthology," stating that it "invites readers to expand the bounds of their belief with each impossible creation." The review particularly praised the stories of newcomers Circe Moskowitz and Linda Raquel Nieves Pérez, noting that they fit in with the more established authors.

Arley Sorg of Lightspeed noted that the publishing industry tends to exclude BIPOC writers, and that anthologies featuring their work are important methods to help readers discover such authors. Sorg stated that Reclaim the Stars feels like a project that "deliberately stands against cultural erasure, or which seeks to improve visibility for those who are too often missing from narratives, or misrepresented when they are presented at all." The review commented on several individual stories, which explore diverse themes including gender norms and classic fairy tale tropes. Sorg concluded the review by recommending this collection for fans of short fiction.

Writing for Locus, Alex Brown stated that "as far as I can tell, this is the first young adult speculative fiction anthology by and about the Latinx diaspora." Brown praised Córdova for her role in assembling it, but felt frustrated that the publishing industry waited until 2022 to publish such a book. Brown concluded that the anthology is "a great – and necessary – addition to every young adult library." Brown recommended the book for both adults and teens, regardless of whether or not they regularly read speculative fiction.

In a review for the audiobook, Kirkus Reviews praised the voice of Almarie Guerra, noting that she shifts between various genres authentically. The review praised her bilingual performance, noting that many of the stories utilize Spanish words and accents.

The anthology won the 2023 Ignyte Award for Outstanding Anthology/Collected Works.
