= A Phoenix First Must Burn =

2020 YA speculative fiction anthology edited by Patrice Caldwell

A Phoenix First Must Burn: Sixteen Stories of Black Girl Magic, Resistance, and Hope
- Editor: Patrice Caldwell
- Language: English
- Subject: Speculative fiction
- Publisher: Viking Books for Young Readers
- Publication date: 10 Mar 2020
- Publication place: United States
- Pages: 368 (hardcover)
- ISBN: 9781984835659

A Phoenix First Must Burn: Sixteen Stories of Black Girl Magic, Resistance, and Hope is a 2020 anthology of young adult speculative fiction short stories, featuring Black girls as protagonists. It was edited by Patrice Caldwell.

== Contents ==
1. "When Life Hands You a Lemon Fruitbomb" by Amerie Mi Marie Nicholson
2. "Gilded" by Elizabeth Acevedo
3. "When Abigail Fields Recalls Her First Death and, subsequently, Her Best Life" by Rebecca Roanhorse
4. "The Rules of the Land" by Alaya Dawn Johnson
5. "A Hagiography of Starlight" by Somaiya Daud
6. "Melie" by Justina Ireland
7. "The Goddess Provides" L. L. McKinney
8. "Hearts Turned to Ash" by Dhonielle Clayton
9. "Letting the Right One In" by Patrice Caldwell
10. "Tender-Headed" by Danny Lore
11. "Kiss the Sun" by Ibi Zoboi
12. "The Actress" by Danielle Paige
13. "The Curse of Love" by Ashley Woodfolk
14. "All the Time in the World" by Charlotte Nicole Davis
15. "The Witch's Skin" by Karen Strong
16. "Sequence" by J. Marcelle Corrie

== Inspiration ==
The title is taken from Parable of the Sower by Octavia E. Butler.

== Reception and awards ==
Alex Brown of Reactor noted that the anthology is filled with #OwnVoices authors. Brown stated that the sixteen stories "run the gamut in terms of settings, creatures, style, and identities, but all are united in respecting and honoring self and culture." The same review stated that the collection celebrates Black identities while challenging preconceptions held by non-Black readers. Brown concluded that the book is "Blackness at its YA SFF best... Patrice Caldwell has changed the game."

Writing for Locus, Colleen Mondor stated that the book "easily fulfills its promise of celebrating Black girl protagonists." Mondor wrote that several of the included stories would be likely to win awards during the upcoming season, and further stated that the anthology was extremely entertaining and wide-ranging. The review concluded by stating that "We need more Black girl magic – a lot more. And we need to be demanding why there hasn’t been more available to eager readers all along."

Kirkus Reviews gave the anthology a starred review, calling it a "vibrant and varied collection." The review stated that the stories are accessible to readers of all background and concluded that the book "lives up to its goal with stories as diverse as the Black experience."

Desiree Thomas of School Library Journal called the book a "wonderful assortment of genre-bending narratives" and stated that it "blends magical realism with issues affecting the black community." Thomas recommended the book for libraries interested in strengthening the diversity in their short story collections.

The anthology won the 2021 Ignyte Award for Outstanding Anthology/Collected Works. It was a finalist for the 2021 Locus Award for Best Anthology.
