= Preeti Chhibber =

Writer, editor and podcast host

- Born: West Palm Beach, Florida
- Education: University of Florida (BA); New York University (MS)
- Occupations: Writer, podcast host, editor

Preeti Chhibber (born mid 1980s) is a writer, podcast host, and editor. Chhibber is known for her middle-grade fiction series Marvel Avengers Assembly, and her series for Marvel, Spider-Man's Social Dilemma.

== Early life and education ==
Chhibber hails from West Palm Beach, Florida. Born in the mid 1980s.

Growing up, Chhibber's mother wanted her to be a doctor. When Chhibber was fourteen, her mother gave her a copy of The Agony and the Ecstasy by Irving Stone, which became a pivotal moment in Chhibber's life. In her freshman year of college, she changed her major from pre-med to English. She earned a BA in English at the University of Florida and an MS in Publishing at New York University. She has two siblings, an actor and a graphic designer.

== Career ==
Chhibber has written for Syfy, BookRiot, BookRiot Comics, ELLE, The Nerds of Color, Polygon, and The Mary Sue.

She has work in the anthology A Thousand Beginnings and Endings, a collection of retellings of fairy tales and myths, and is the author of the Spider-Man: Far from Home tie-in Peter and Ned's Ultimate Travel Journal for Marvel. Chhibber was formerly a co-host on the podcast SYFY FANGRRLS STRONG FEMALE CHARACTERS.

She co-hosts a Wheel of Time podcast, Tar Valon or Bust, the Desi Geek Girls podcast, and Marvel's Women of Marvel.

In 2019, Chhibber was a panelist at San Diego Comic-Con.

== Works ==
=== Spider-Man ===
- Peter and Ned's Ultimate Travel Journal (March 2019)
- Spider-Man's Social Dilemma (July 2022)
- Spider-Man's Bad Connection. (September 2023)

=== Marvel's Avengers Assembly ===
- Marvel's Avengers Assembly: Orientation (January 2020)
- Marvel's Avengers Assembly: The Sinister Substitute (January 2021)
- Marvel's Avengers Assembly: X-Change Students 101 (January 2022)

=== Star Wars ===
- A Jedi, You Will Be (2020)
- Star Wars: The Clone Wars: Stories of Light and Dark

=== Comics ===
- DC Comics' Truth and Justice #7: Dream a Little Dream (2021)
- Women of Marvel #1: Four Jobs Felicia Hated and One She Didn't (2022)
- Love Unlimited #61–66: Gambit & Rogue (2023)

=== Other projects ===
- A Thousand Beginnings and Endings (June 2018)
- Sword Stone Table (July 2021)
- Battle of the Bands (September 2021)
- "7:00 A.M.: BHAVNA JOSHI" in The Grimoire of Grave Fates (June 2023)
- Magic Has No Borders (July 2023)
- Mermaids Never Drown (September 2023)
- Payal Mehta's Romance Revenge Plot (September 2024)
- He's Just Some Guy (March 2027)

=== Podcasts ===
- The Riddler: Secrets in the Dark (2023)
