= We're Here: The Best Queer Speculative Fiction 2020 =

2021 anthology edited by Charles Payseur and C. L. Clark

We’re Here: The Best Queer Speculative Fiction 2020
- Editor: Charles Payseur; C. L. Clark
- Cover artist: Sajan Rai
- Language: English
- Series: We're Here
- Genre: Speculative fiction; LGBTQ literature
- Publisher: Neon Hemlock, 24 Aug 2021
- Publication place: United States
- Pages: 264 (Paperback)
- Awards: 2022 Ignyte Award for Outstanding Anthology/Collected Works; 2022 Locus Award for Best Anthology
- ISBN: 9781952086274
- Followed by: We’re Here: The Best Queer Speculative Fiction 2021

We’re Here: The Best Queer Speculative Fiction 2020 is a 2021 anthology of short fiction focusing on LGBTQ characters and themes. The book collects works published in the 2020 calendar year. It was edited by Charles Payseur and C. L. Clark. The anthology won the 2022 Ignyte Award for Outstanding Anthology/Collected Works and Locus Award for Best Anthology.

== Contents ==
The anthology contains the following 16 stories:

1. "If You Take My Meaning" by Charlie Jane Anders
2. "A Voyage to Queensthroat" by Anya Johanna DeNiro
3. “Rat and Finch are Friends” by Innocent Chizaram Ilo
4. “Salt and Iron” by Gem Isherwood
5. "The Currant Dumas" by L. D. Lewis
6. “Everquest” by Naomi Kanakia
7. "Portrait of Three Women with an Owl" by Gwen C. Katz
8. “The Ashes of Vivian Firestrike” by Kristen Koopman
9. “To Balance the Weight of Khalem” by R. B. Lemberg
10. “Thin Red Jellies” by Lina Rather
11. “Body, Remember” by Nicasio Andres Reed
12. “Escaping Dr. Markoff” by Gabriela Santiago
13. "The Last Good Time to Be Alive" by Waverly SM
14. “Monsters Never Leave You” by Carlie St. George
15. "The Wedding After The Bomb" by Brendan Williams-Childs (Catapult, April 2020)
16. "8-Bit Free Will" by John Wiswell

== Reception and awards ==
Publishers Weekly called the book "a diverse, well-crafted anthology of queer speculative fiction." The review stated that the anthology includes a wide variety of stories, yet noted that they were "united by explorations of transformation and movement." The review concluded that this start to an anthology series "reinforces Neon Hemlock’s spot at the apex of queer speculative fiction publishing."

Arley Sorg of Lightspeed praised the independent publisher Neon Hemlock, writing that it stands as an example of a well-run independent publishing company. Regarding We're Here, Sorg stated that its status as a "Year's Best" or reprint anthology made it fundamentally different from an anthology of original works. The review stated that "it’s a welcome addition, and does stand as important and unique in the scope of 'Year’s Bests'." Sorg praised the authors who were included in the anthology; with the exception of Charlie Jane Anders, they are generally authors who have not achieved widespread fame and awards recognition. Sorg concluded that the book would be a great addition to the reading list of short fiction fans.

The anthology won the 2022 Ignyte Award for Outstanding Anthology/Collected Works and Locus Award for Best Anthology.
