= The Grimoire of Grave Fates =

2023 anthology edited by Hanna Alkaf and Margaret Owen

- Editor: Hanna Alkaf and Margaret Owen
- Publisher: Delacorte
- Publication date: June 6, 2023
- ISBN: 978-0593427453

The Grimoire of Grave Fates is a 2023 short story fantasy anthology edited by Hanna Alkaf and Margaret Owen. It features eighteen stories about the students of a magic academy who become suspects when a bigoted professor is murdered.

== Premise ==
The book is set over the course of a day at the Galileo Academy for the Extraordinary, a school that teaches magic. The book opens in the early morning with the widely hated Professor Septimius Dropwort, who was discriminatory against students on multiple grounds such as race, gender, sexuality, and disability, being found dead. Each story is told at a different hour from the perspective of a different student, who find themselves being suspected of the murder and must work together to unmask the killer.

== Stories ==
- "2:00 A.M.: Wren Willemson, 16, Swords" by Marieke Nijkamp
- "3:00 A.M.: Diego Sakay, 17, Coins" by Randy Ribay
- "4:00 A.M.: Jameson "JB" Brig, 15, Coins" by Kwame Mbalia
- "5:00 A.M.: Taya Winter, 16, Swords & Wands" by Darcie Little Badger
- "6:00 A.M.: Keturah Austin, 18, Wands & Swords" by Cam Montgomery
- "7:00 A.M.: Bhavna Joshl, 15, Swords" by Preeti Chhibber
- "8:00 A.M.: Jia Park, 15, Undecided" by Kat Cho
- "9:00 A.M.: Irene Seaver, 16, Cups/Coins" by Kayla Whaley
- "10:00-ish A.M. (or earlier? Maybe later): Sydney Meeks, 16, It's Complicated" by L.L. McKinney
- "12:00 P.M.: Mariam Abidin, 16, Wands" by Hafsah Faizal
- "1:00 P.M.: Xander Wilson, 15, Undecided" by Julian Winters
- "2:00 P.M.: Nadiya Nur, 15, Wands/Arcana" by Karuna Riazi
- "3:00 P.M.: Delores "Lola" Cortez, 16, Coins" by Tehlor Kay Mejia
- "4:00 P.M.: Maxwell Aster, 16, Cups" by Mason Deaver
- "5:00 P.M.: Jamie Ellison, 17, Swords" by Victoria Lee
- "6:00 P.M.: Delfina Moore, 16, Cups/Swords" by Yamile Saied Méndez
- "7:00 P.M.: Ivy Barta, 16, Coins" by Jessica Lewis
- "8:00 P.M.: Lupita Augratricis, 16, Coins" by Natasha Díaz

== Reception ==
Kirkus Reviews gave the anthology a starred review, concluding that the authors' "many individual voices are threaded together well, leading up to a conclusion that is cohesive and actively empowering." Reviewing the audiobook adaption by January LaVoy and Nicky Endres, they stated "Endres balances LaVoy’s playful tones with a serious delivery of case evidence."

Publishers Weekly noted how the one-day timeline of the book gave the anthology an urgent tone, and further added "the myriad perspectives lend nuance, leading to a satisfyingly cohesive collection."

Emmy Neal of School Library Journal said "some stories are stronger than others, but the consistent plotting keeps things interesting."
