= Karen Lord =

Barbadian writer of speculative fiction (born 1968)

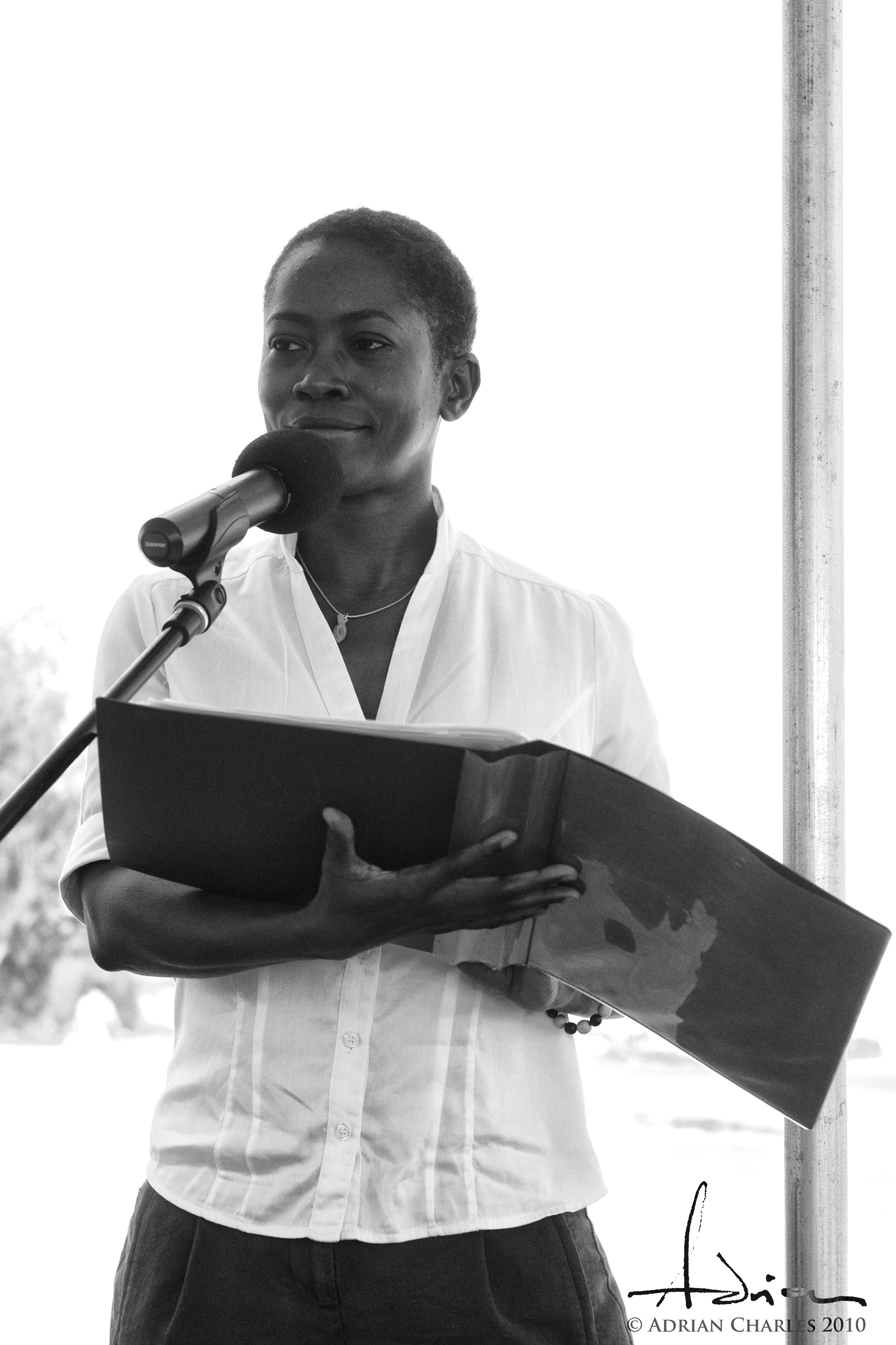
- Lord at an environmental awareness literary event in Barbados, 2009
- Born: Karen Antoinette Roberta Lord; 22 May 1968 (age 58); Barbados
- Education: Queen’s College; University of Toronto; University of Strathclyde; Bangor University (PhD)
- Occupation: Writer
- Writing career
- Genres: Fantasy, social science fiction, speculative fiction
- Subject: Sociology of religion
- Notable works: Redemption in Indigo (2010), The Best of All Possible Worlds (2013)
- Notable awards: Frank Collymore Literary Award, 2008; Carl Brandon Society Parallax Award, 2010; Crawford Award, 2011; Mythopoeic Award, 2011; Kitschies Golden Tentacle Award for the Best Debut Novel, 2012
- Website: karenlord.wordpress.com

Karen Lord (born 22 May 1968) is a Barbadian writer of speculative fiction. Her first novel, Redemption in Indigo (2010), retells the story "Ansige Karamba the Glutton" from Senegalese folklore. Her second novel, The Best of All Possible Worlds (2013), is an example of social science fiction. Lord also writes on the sociology of religion.

== Early life and education ==
Karen Lord was born in Barbados. She attended secondary school at Queen's College in Bridgetown. She earned her undergraduate degree from the University of Toronto, studying physics and the history of science and technology.

Lord earned a master's degree in science and technology policy at the University of Strathclyde in Glasgow. She later earned her PhD in the sociology of religion from Bangor University in Wales (conferred in 2008, the first year of its independence from the University of Wales).

== Novels ==
Lord's debut novel, Redemption in Indigo, was originally published in the United States in 2010 by Small Beer Press, and was republished in England in 2012 by Quercus under its Jo Fletcher Books imprint for SF, fantasy, and horror titles. The New York Times called it "a clever, exuberant mix of Caribbean and Senegalese influences that balances riotously funny set pieces ... with serious drama", the Caribbean Review of Books commented that the novel is "very sprightly from start to finish, with vivid descriptions, memorable heroes and villains, brisk pacing", and it was summed up by Booklist as "one of those literary works of which it can be said that not a word should be changed".

The Best of All Possible Worlds was published by Jo Fletcher Books/Quercus and Del Rey Books/Random House in 2013. One reviewer called it "a thoughtful and emotional novel ... one of the most enjoyable books I've recently read", while Nalo Hopkinson wrote in the Los Angeles Review of Books: "The Best of All Possible Worlds put me in mind of Junot Díaz’s brilliant novel The Brief Wondrous Life of Oscar Wao. Not stylistically: while Oscar Wao is an experimental pelau of modes served up in Díaz’s distinctly Dominicano and in-your-face voice, The Best of All Possible Worlds is a beautiful shape-shifter."

The Galaxy Game, which was released on 6 January 2015 from Del Rey Books/Random House, was described in an early review as "a satisfying exercise in being off-balance, a visceral lesson in how to fall forward and catch yourself in an amazing new place." Publishers Weekly referred to it as a "subtle, cerebral novel", while The Guardian's reviewer wrote that "the novel is a leisurely exploration of multiple societies, power-politics and race relations, in which discursive plot lines deceive before cohering in a satisfying finale."

The Blue, Beautiful World was published in August 2023 by Del Rey in the US and Gollancz in the UK. It was described in The Guardian as a "complex, engaging novel [...] with a warmth and intelligence reminiscent of Ursula K Le Guin." The Big Issue characterised it as "infused with a kind of forward-thinking empathy and respect" and noted that the novel "has a lot to say about post-colonialism, though [Lord] plays with those ideas in a subtle and open-hearted fashion."

== Short stories ==
Lord's short story "Hiraeth: A Tragedy in Four Acts" was published in the anthology Reach for Infinity, edited by Jonathan Strahan (2014), and she contributed the short story "Cities of the Sun" to Margaret Busby's 2019 anthology New Daughters of Africa. Also in 2019, Lord wrote "The Plague Doctors" for Take us to a Better Place: Stories, produced by Melcher Media and the Robert Wood Johnson Foundation. Lord's short stories "Legend" (2022) and "A Timely Horizon" (2023) were published in The Sunday Morning Transport, edited by Julian Yap and Fran Wilde.. In 2025, Lord wrote "Take Three" for Sound Systems: The Future of the Orchestra, edited by Alex Laing, Joey Eschrich, and Ed Finn.

== Awards ==
Redemption in Indigo won the 2008 Frank Collymore Literary Endowment Award for Best Unpublished Manuscript, the 2010 Carl Brandon Society Parallax Award, the 2011 Crawford Award, the 2011 Mythopoeic Award, and the 2012 Kitschies Golden Tentacle Award for the Best Debut Novel.

Redemption in Indigo was also nominated for the 2011 World Fantasy Award for Best Novel and for the John W. Campbell Award for Best New Writer, and longlisted for the 2011 OCM Bocas Prize for Caribbean Literature.

The Blue, Beautiful World was longlisted for the 2024 Women's Prize for Fiction.

We Will Rise Again (edited with Annalee Newitz & Malka Older) won the Locus Award for Best Anthology in 2026. It won the 2026 Ignyte Award for Outstanding Anthology/Collected Works.

In 2026, Lord was a finalist for the Ember Award, given by the Ignyte Awards.

== Personal life ==
Lord lives in Barbados. In 2026, she taught the novel writing workshop for the Clarion West Writers Workshop.

== Bibliography ==
=== Novels ===
- Redemption in Indigo. Small Beer Press, Jo Fletcher Books/Quercus, 2010. (ISBN 978-1780873084), 2012.
- The Best of All Possible Worlds. Jo Fletcher Books, 2013. (hardback ISBN 978-1780871660; paperback ISBN 978-1780871684).
- The Galaxy Game. London: Jo Fletcher Books. 2015. ISBN 978-1-78087-689-4.
- Unravelling. DAW Books, 2019. (ISBN 978-0-7564-1520-4).
- The Blue, Beautiful World. Del Rey, 2023. (ISBN 978-0593598436).

Reprints/other editions

- The Galaxy Game. (paperback). New York: Del Rey. 2015. ISBN 9780345534071.

=== As editor ===
- New Worlds, Old Ways: Speculative Tales from the Caribbean. Peepal Tree Press, 2016; ISBN 9781845233365
- Reclaim, Restore, Return: Futurist Tales from the Caribbean. Caribbean Futures Institute. 2020; ASIN B0DM2J76XD
- We Will Rise Again: Speculative Stories and Essays on Protest, Resistance, and Hope. S&S/Saga Press, 2025; ISBN 9781845233365

=== Critical studies and reviews of Lord's work ===
The Best of all Possible Worlds

- Spinrad, Norman (October–November 2013). "Genre versus literature". On Books. Asimov's Science Fiction. 37 (10–11): 182–191.

The Galaxy Game

- Sakers, Don (June 2015). "The Reference Library". Analog Science Fiction and Fact. 135 (6): 105–108.

== Interviews ==
- Richard Fidler, "Writer and academic Karen Lord finds inspiration in folklore", Conversations (radio interview), ABC, Australia, 5 March 2013.
- Gavin Grant, "Karen Lord: An author's brave new world", BookPage, 18 January 2013.
- The Spaces Between the Words: Conversations with Writers (a podcast series affiliated with the Literatures in English section at The University of the West Indies, St Augustine Campus and The Caribbean Review of Books)
- "Nalo Hopkinson and Karen Lord in Conversation: Caribbean Folklore, Lovecraft, and More" (Locus Roundtable Podcast with Karen Burnham, 4 November 2011)
- Podcast Interview on Bibliophile Stalker (with Charles Tan), 4 November 2011
- Interview with Chesya Burke at the World SF Blog, 29 August 2011
- "Karen Burnham and Karen Lord in Conversation: Science, Communication, and Society" (Locus Roundtable Podcast), 3 August 2011
- "Karen Lord: Dual Reality": Excerpts from an interview in Locus Magazine, 11 August 2011
- Jeremy L. C. Jones, "Always a New World: A Conversation with Karen Lord", Clarkesworld Magazine, Issue 77, February 2013.
- Rhiannon Brown, "Karen Lord's Possible Worlds", ABC Radio National, 26 January 2014.
- "A Conversation with Karen Lord". Interview by Marta Fernández Campa. Caribbean Literary Heritage, 23 April 2018.
