= Redemption in Indigo =

2010 novel by Karen Lord

Redemption in Indigo is a contemporary folktale-fantasy novel by Karen Lord, Published by Small Beer Press in 2010. The Novel revolves around Paama, a young cook living in a village in the Savannah, and her journey from struggles with her gluttonous husband to battles against the all powerful spirit lord.

== Summary ==
The book starts off with a short prologue, where some of the book`s most important characters are introduced. Kwame, a tracker (who will become more important later) gets hired by a man named Ansige to locate his wife who moved away two years ago. Paama Ansige’s wife and the main character of the book also gets a short introduction where it's explained that she's a phenomenal cook. Lastly the author switches from Kwame's perspective to two mysterious characters discussing Paama's fate and hindering Ansige in his way to her.

The story then begins with Ansige's journey to bring Paama back, and here the story follows almost the exact plot of the folk tale “Ansige Karamba the Glutton” from “ The Cow tail Switch and other West African stories” but with more detail and new elements. The two most important being the re-introduction of the mysterious pair who blocks Ansiges' way to Paama slowing him down and the mythology of the book appearing for the first time. With a talking spider based on the Anansi (meaning spider ) trickster, a key part of west african folklore who convinces Ansiges servants to leave him. When Ansige finally arrives in Paama's village the story follows the folktale almost to a tee. Ansige repeatedly gets into trouble because of his insatiable gluttony and Paama having to rescue him time again, until he hits his head and is finally sent away.

After Ansige's departure it's like a completely new story begins. The mysterious pair reappears and we learn that they are so-called Djombi (sometimes spelled Jumbee,Jumbi etc.) , some kind of a godly spirit demons, that have the power to make “shadows” of animals and sometimes humans and speak through a copy of them. The pair uses this ability to give Paama the chaos stick, and then to teach her to use it. The chaos stick is said to jabe the power to control and manipulate chance and chaos. Its here in the story the main antagonist is introduced, The Indigo Lord, a lord within the Djobi and the original owner of the stick. Upon learning the whereabouts of the stick the indigo lord uses multiple shadows of insects to spy on Paama's village. The Djombi teaching Paama grows suspicious and urges her to flee. She flees to the local “house of sisters” for protection. The Indigo Lord finally arrives in the village just as Paama leaves, now suspecting Paamas sister Neila being the one who has the stick, being blinded by her beauty. The Lord possesses the shadow of a wealthy man to charm Paama. To stop their wedding Paama travels back to the village with both gifts and teachings from the sisters. After Paama’s confrontation with The Indigo Lord he uses his powers to travel through space and time to show Paama’s that humans are too fragile to have the Stick. Paama finally gives up but through their journeys and discussions she unknowingly manages to convince The Lord to start using his powers for good

The story concludes with Paama traveling to Ansige who's on his deathbed , simultaneously Kwame, the tracker from the prologue is sent by the sisters to locate Paama. After Ansige's death Paama and Kwame fall in love, get married and have their fairytale ending

== Central Themes ==
The most central theme is the fairytale-folktale element, both with the book starting with a classic West African folktale and other elements throughout the book such as, a narrator speaking directly to the reader and things repeating in threes. The author has in an interview called the book “a folktale at heart”. Another central theme is the exploration of self and soul searching. Both the main character and the main antagonist go through clear, deep character arcs coming out on the other side as completely new and evolved characters. Especially Paama has a very clear journey where she even goes through literal soul searching at the sister house. In the very last chapter of the book the author describes the book as “a story about choices” that come with “change and opportunity”

== Development ==
The novel was first drafted in 2003 but Lord did not nominate it for the Frank Collymore Award until 2009. After it won the award Jamaican writer and editor Nalo Hopkinson posted about it which led to Small Beer Press finding Lord and helping her with the publishing of the book. Lord said in interviews that she likes to write “two books per novel” and the reason for choosing the Ansige Karamba story was that it was her favourite growing up

== Reception ==
The book won multiple awards such as the Frank Collymore Award and the Crawford Fantasy Award. It was described by the New York Times book review as a “clever exuberant mix of caribbean and senegalese influences that balances riotously funny set pieces with serious drama”, and by The Washington Post as “a rare find that you could hand to your child, your mother or your best friend” Victoria Hoyle for Strange Horizons wrote "The denouement of the book—the part where both comic and moral stories are tied together with a happy flourish—is all about this, about how a person (or a spirit) might pay the world back for his sins."
