= Thyme Travellers =

2024 anthology edited by Sonia Sulaiman

Thyme Travellers: An Anthology of Palestinian Speculative Fiction
- Editor: Sonia Sulaiman
- Language: English
- Genre: Speculative fiction
- Publisher: Roseway Publishing
- Publication date: 5 Sep 2024
- Publication place: Canada
- Pages: 160 (Paperback)
- Awards: 2025 Ignyte Award for Outstanding Anthology/Collected Works
- ISBN: 9781773636948

Thyme Travellers: An Anthology of Palestinian Speculative Fiction is a 2024 anthology edited by Sonia Sulaiman.

== Contents ==
The anthology contains fourteen separate stories.

1. "Down Under" by Jumaana Abdu
2. "The Third or Fourth Casualty" by Ziyad Saadi
3. "The Generation Chip" by Nadia Afifi
4. "Soul Searching" by Rana Othman
5. "The Heart Knows the Truth" by Layla Azmi Goushey
6. "Cyrano de AI" by Karl El-Koura
7. "The Frontrunner" by J. D. Harlock
8. "A Table Set for Two" by Emad El-Din Aysha
9. "In the Future, We Can Go Back Home" by Sara Solara
10. "The Forty" by Sonia Sulaiman
11. "Remembrance in Cerulean" by Elise Stephens
12. "Gaza Luna" by Samah Serour Fadil
13. "Orlando's Wolf" by Rasha Abdulhadi
14. "The Centre of the Universe" by Nadia Shammas

== Reception and awards ==
Alex Brown of Reactor called the book "a fantastic anthology full of talented authors and imaginative premises." Brown particularly praised the stories "Cyrano de AI" and "Generation Chip" for their exploration of the pros and cons of technology, as well as their portrayal of family relationships. The story "Remembrance in Cerulean" describes the conflict between settlers and refugees in terms of a human vs. alien conflict. Brown wrote that the story "Down Under" was one of the best short stories of the year, stating that it "left me feeling scoured and seething and energized all at once."

Akankshya Abismruta of Strange Horizons wrote that the anthology "haunts readers with its themes of belonging, returning home, and the future as an inference of the past." The title is a reference to thyme, an important staple in Palestinian cuisine. Abismruta stated that "Israeli occupation of Palestine has eliminated access to the land in which Palestinians grow the herb, affecting their livelihoods. For refugees, the herb has become symbolic of a hope to return home." The reviewer felt that the story "Gaza Luna" was a stand-out among the many strong entries in the anthology. This story depicts a child who is sent to live with an aunt after his house is blown up; he is forbidden from flying a Palestinian flag or recognizing his own ethnic identity. Abismruta recommended the story for "everyone who knows what it feels like to perform patriotism." The reviewer concluded that the stories "demand that readers reflect on their responses to genocide, challenge their imaginations of Palestinians, and, despite the serious subject matter, entertain."

Manahil Bandukwala of Quill and Quire wrote that the story "Down Under" examines the question of Palestinian refugees and their connection to a land that they may never have known. The stories "The Generation Chip" and "In the Future, We Can Go Back Home" both examine the queer community in Palestine. Both stories feature a grandmother who is queer, "speaking to differences in Palestinian society as well as the importance of matrilineal legacy within Palestinian culture." Bandukwala concluded that the anthology's writers "explore generational connections, especially as a way of resistance to colonial violence."

The collection won the 2025 Ignyte Award for Outstanding Anthology/Collected Works and was a finalist for the 2025 Locus Award for Best Anthology.
