= The Merciful Crow =

2019 novel by Margaret Owen

- Author: Margaret Owen
- Publisher: Henry Holt and Company
- Publication date: 30 July 2019
- Followed by: The Faithless Hawk

The Merciful Crow is a young adult romantic fantasy novel by Margaret Owen. It was released in 2019, and published by Henry Holt and Company. It was followed by The Faithless Hawk.

== Setting ==
The Merciful Crow is set in the fictional land of Sabor, which is governed by a monarchy and is split into a caste system.

The caste system is divided into 5 categories: Phoenix, Splendid, Hunting, Common, and Crow. Each caste has a unique birthright magical ability that is innately present in every person born into a specific caste. Within each caste, there are a select few known as 'witches', individuals who possess a more potent version of their respective caste birthrights.

The Phoenix caste is the ruling family of Sabor; their birthright is fire. The Splendid Caste consists of "Peacocks" whose birthright is of glamour, "Swans" whose birthright is desire, and "Doves" whose birthright is artistry.

The Hunting caste consists of "Hawks" whose birthright is blood/healing, "Cranes" whose birthright is the truth, "Owls" whose birthright is memory, and "Vultures" whose birthright is hunting.

The Common caste consists of "Gulls" whose birthright is the wind, "Pigeons" whose birthright is luck, and "Sparrows" whose birthright is refuge/hiding.

At the bottom of society is the Crow caste, which only consists of the Crows, who have no birthright. Instead, they are immune towards the sinners plague, a highly contagious and incurable disease that has ravaged Sabor for centuries. Due to their immunity, they offer to euthanize those who are suffering from the plague and safely dispose of the bodies. Furthermore, crow witches are able to harness the latent magic within the teeth or bones of other caste members and make use of the birthright abilities from other caste members. Due to their association with the Sinner's Plague and their ability to 'steal' others' birthrights, Crows are stigmatized and ostracized by the other members of society.

== Plot ==
Fie is the future chieftain of the Crows, the shunned caste of mercy-killers. She relies on her wits and bone magic – drawn from the teeth of dead witches and only used by Crow witches – to protect her band of fellow Crows. The Crows struggle financially, so Fie is enthusiastic when they're called to collect the royal dead, hoping the mission will be lucrative.

Fie learns that Crown Prince Jasimir "Jas" and his bodyguard, Tavin, have faked their deaths to escape the ruthless Queen Rhusana. Although Fie is hostile towards the duo at first, Jas offers her a deal: ensure his survival, and he will protect the Crows when he reigns. Fie makes the deal, and plans to meet up with a cousin of Jasimir's to rally the public against Rhusana.

However, after Hangdog, one of the members of their Crow band, betrays them for a hopeless endeavor of moving up in the caste system, the band of Crows splits up so Jasimir and Tavin have their best shot at reaching their destination. Fie has the solo responsibility to help them reach Draga, the highest Military Officer and Tavin's mother. The trio races across dangerous terrain, such as snowy mountain passes, to avoid the Oleanders and Skinghasts that Rhusana has sent after them. Fie uses bone magic to keep the boys safe until they reach their destination. To outrun and outwit the queen, the trio forge an uneasy alliance that is tested by old secrets, shifting allegiances, and Tavin and Fie's developing romance.

== Characters ==
=== Main characters ===
- Fie (a Crow) – The feisty main character who wishes to see the Crow caste treated better within society and is willing to do anything to see it happen - while having romantic feelings for Tavin despite his higher ranking in their society, which she sees as wrong.
- Crown Prince Jasimir (a Phoenix) – The heir to the throne of Sabor who believes that his step mother, Queen Rhusana, is plotting to kill his father to take the throne for herself. She relentlessly tries to foil Jasimir's plans, which is why he seeks support of high-ranking members of society (e.g. Hawks) to help him move against her.
- Tavin (a Hawk) – the bodyguard, body double, and half brother of the Crown Prince Jasimir who is willing to do anything to see that Jasimir is safe and will sit on the throne of Sabor. Tavin himself has no right to the crown. He has a romantic interest in Fie despite her lower ranking in society.
- Queen Rhusana (a Swan) – the manipulative wife to King Surimir that is plotting to kill him in order to take the crown and throne so she can dispose of the Crow caste.

=== Side characters ===
- King Surimir (a Phoenix) – King of Sabor and father of Prince Jasimir and the biological father of Tavin.
- Pa (Crow Chief/Witch) – father of Fie and the main Crow chieftain.
- Hangdog (Crow) – traitor and Fie's ex-boyfriend.
- Wretch (a Crow) – part of Fie's band of crows.
- Swain (a Crow) – part of Fie's band of crows. Swain is the only part of the band who can - initially - read.
- Madcap (a Crow) – part of Fie's band of crows.
- Viimo (a Vulture) – one of the hunters that Queen Rhusana hires to track down Prince Jasimir, Tavin, and Fie to intercept them before they rally the troops against her; however, Viimo has a change of heart at the very end.
- Tatterhelm (a Vulture) – the lead hunter that Queen Rhusana hires to track down Prince Jasimir, Tavin, and Fie to intercept them before they rally the troops against her; He is the main hunter that the trio worries about while making their way to Tavin's mother, Draga.
- Draga (a Hawk) – Tavin's mother and the highest-ranking officer in the military.
- Barf – a gray Tabby Cat that was used as payment by Queen Rhusana for the Crows properly "disposing" of Prince Jasimir and Tavin's bodies after they both "caught the sinners plague" who adds a source of comedy amongst the drama.
- Oleander Gentry – a group from various castes who hate/hunt Crows; Rhusana's minions that help assist in tracking down the prince, his body guard, and their Crow companion.
- Skinghast – A wicked undead being that Queen Rhusana controls using her dual ability of Swan and vulture witch that can only be defeated by fire.

== Awards and nominations ==
- 2019 Goodreads' Year's Most Popular YA Debuts So Far winner
- 2019 Parents Choice Award Winner
- 2020 Young Adult Library Services Association (YALSA): A Division of the American Library Association, Best Fiction for Young Adults

== Receprion ==
Kirkus Reviews called the novel "Rich, harrowing, and unafraid to tackle discrimination—perfect for fans of Leigh Bardugo and Tomi Adeyemi."
