= A Blade So Black =

2018 novel by L. L. McKinney

- Author: L.L. McKinney
- Language: English
- Series: The Nightmare-Verse
- Genre: Fantasy
- Publisher: Imprint/Macmillan
- Publication date: September 2018
- Publication place: United States
- Media type: Print (hardback and paperback)
- Pages: 384 (first edition, hardback)
- ISBN: 978-1-250-15390-6 (first edition, hardback)
- Followed by: A Dream So Dark

A Blade So Black is a young adult fantasy novel written by L.L. McKinney and volume 1 of The Nightmare-Verse series. It is a contemporary re-imagining of the Lewis Carroll book Alice's Adventures in Wonderland with a black teenage girl protagonist. A Blade So Black was released on September 25, 2018 by Imprint/Macmillan.

== Plot ==
"When Atlanta teenager Alice Kingston’s father dies of heart failure—while at their favorite event, Dragon Con—she immediately is attacked by a “Nightmare” monster and then saved by Addison Hatta, a guardian of the portal between Atlanta and Wonderland."

== Themes ==
The book deals with themes of nightmares and fears. It incorporates elements of generational trauma specific to the treatment of African Americans in the American south. A Blade So Black has been described as Afrofuturist by scholars.

== Critical reception ==
School Library Journal described the book as "a must-purchase where refreshing urban fantasies and retellings are in demand. Enishia Davenport wrote in a starred review for Booklist, "McKinney breathes new life and fierce empowerment into Carroll’s classic. Her Wonderland is menacing, lush, and unique and populated by nuanced characters that are fleshed out and refreshingly authentic." Kate Quealy-Gainer described it in a review for The Bulletin of the Center for Children's Books: "With a modern flair, a rich backstory, and just enough emotional heft, this particular looking glass will have readers eagerly falling through it." In a less positive review, Publishers Weekly stated: "The mechanics of Wonderland, its features, and its creatures sometimes feel hastily sketched, and secondary characters lack depth, but McKinney’s imagination knows few bounds, and Alice’s devotion to the others is contagious."

== Adaptations ==
In December 2018 it was announced that Lionsgate optioned television rights to the book.
