= PublishingPaidMe =

Hashtag exposing racial pay disparities in publishing

#PublishingPaidMe is a hashtag, used mainly on Twitter, and a grassroots campaign to expose racial disparities in pay in the publishing industry. The hashtag was created by writer L.L. McKinney on June 6, 2020, and culminated in the development of a crowdsourced Google document in which authors shared their advance payments. The document showed relatively lower advance payments offered to Black writers compared to their White counterparts.

== Purpose ==
The hashtag, #PublishingPaidMe, was created on June 6, 2020, by U.S. author L.L. McKinney to "highlight the disparity between what's paid to non-Black authors vs. Black authors." About the name, McKinney said in an interview, "It was short and to the point. I like alliteration, so it was just one of those things that clicked together. It was for the people who would be using it, so it’s like the beginning of a sentence." Information shared using the hashtag has focused on book publishing advances, because they are easy to tweet and understand. A publishing advance is a payment authors receive while still writing a book.

== Response ==
Quickly after the hashtag went viral a Google Document was created and writers began crowdsourcing and sharing information about advances. As of June 12, 2020, the Google document had information for over 2,500 books. The document shows that well-known and award-winning Black authors earn comparatively small advances compared to some virtually unknown White authors with little to no publishing history who have received incredibly large advances.

The same week the hashtag was created it was tweeted and retweeted thousands of times. News outlets such as the New York Times, National Public Radio, and the Guardian covered the story. Although started in the US, within days the hashtag sparked conversations in France and the UK about racial disparity in publishing.

== Impact ==
Approximately one week after the hashtag #PublishingPaidMe went viral, another hashtag, #BlackOutBestsellerList also rose to prominence. The creation of this hashtag was propelled by both the George Floyd protests and #PublishingPaidMe hashtag. The #BlackOutBestsellerList was used by Black publishers and authors to encourage readers to buy books by Black authors between June 14 and 20, with the ultimate goal of taking over the bestseller lists.
