= Saundra =

Saundra is a given name and may refer to:

- Saundra Santiago, American actress most noted for her work on Miami Vice
- Saundra Quarterman, American actress most noted for her role on Hangin' with Mr. Cooper
- Saundra Edwards, American actress and model
- Saundra Smokes, American journalist
- Saundra Meyer, American politician
