= The Summer of Everything =

2020 novel by Julian Winters

- Author: Julian Winters
- Language: English
- Genre: Bildungsroman; Young adult novel
- Publisher: Interlude Press
- Publication date: September 8, 2020
- Publication place: United States
- Pages: 312
- ISBN: 978-1-945053-91-7

The Summer of Everything is a coming of age young adult novel by Julian Winters, published in 2020 by Interlude Press. It is about a gay teenager called Wesley Hudson, who has just finished high school and is not sure whether he wants to go to college or to stay where he is and work at an indie bookstore.

== Reception ==
Kirkus Reviews praised the diversity of ethnicity and gender of the characters, saying that "[f]ans of the friends-to-lovers trope will enjoy the amusing voice." The writer criticised the lack of development of an aromantic asexual character, and noted how the "teen characters who reference Madonna, listen to music produced before the year 2000, and love Empire Records and Buffy the Vampire Slayer" are a weakness to the overall story.

Mindy Rhiger, who reviewed the novel for the School Library Journal, commented on how the choice of pop culture reference "may not be familiar to teen readers", but praised its "lovable cast of characters". Rhiger's verdict was: "Hand this book to fans of realistic fiction looking for a quick, mostly light read that is full of heart." The Summer of Everything received a starred review from The Booklist, which said "[t]he resulting combination of romcom and coming-of-age novel is an absolute delight from beginning to end and is highly recommended."
