= Saundra Smokes =

American journalist

- Born: Saundra Smokes; October 8, 1954; Syracuse, NY, U.S.
- Died: August 8, 2012 (aged 57)
- Other name: Sandy
- Occupations: Award-winning journalist, playwright, free-lance journalist, Radio Producer, Activist
- Movement: Civil rights
- Website: https://web.archive.org/web/20160109214050/http://www.saundrasmokes.net/

Saundra Smokes (October 8, 1954 – August 8, 2012) was an American journalist and playwright. Saundra was a free-lance journalist for 3.5 years and a former employee of The Post-Standard for more than 30 years. She was a member of the National Association of Black Journalists, inducted into the Syracuse Press Club Wall of Distinction, and was a member of the Paul Robeson Performing Arts Company. She was also a syndicated columnist for 22 newspapers nationwide and won a Cable Ace award for a video drama.

== Early life and career beginnings ==
Smokes was born in Syracuse, New York, and graduated from Nottingham High School. She attended the University of Buffalo, and then lived in Albany for a time before taking a job with the Herald Journal in 1978.

== Column content ==
Through her column she shared her opinions about topics including, but not limited to race relations, politics, poverty, health, and popular culture. In November 1992, she wrote a column on the trial of police officers involved in the beating of Los Angeles motorist Rodney King that was picked up by newspapers across the country.

Saundra Smokes also wrote plays, including A Tribute to Motown and In Our Own Backyard, and a video drama, Daddy’s Home, which won a Cable Ace award.

Smokes won numerous journalism awards, including a first-place community service award from the New York State Publishers Association for her 2003 editorial series, “Taxpayers Held Hostage.” In 2004 she was inducted into the Syracuse Press Club's Wall of Distinction, a permanent exhibit in the Civic Center.

== Other work ==
In May 2012, she began writing a guest column for The Post-Standard, and in June she started a weekly radio show on WHEN-AM, Power 620, Saundra Smokes Speaks on Venus. She published many columns that were recognized by journalists across the nation.
