= Ignyte Award for Outstanding Anthology/Collected Works =

Annual literary award for speculative fiction

- Awarded for: An anthology (featuring multiple authors) or a collection (featuring works by a single author)
- Country: United States
- Presented by: FIYAH Literary Magazine
- First award: 2020; 6 years ago
- Most recent winner: Karen Lord, Annalee Newitz, Malka Older (We Will Rise Again: Speculative Stories and Essays on Protest, Resistance, and Hope)
- Website: ignyteawards.fiyahlitmag.com

The Ignyte Award for Outstanding Anthology/Collected Works is a literary award given annually as part of the Ignyte Awards.

== Winners and finalists ==
* Winners

Year	Author / Editor	Work	Publisher	Ref.
2020	Nisi Shawl, ed.*	New Suns: Original Speculative Fiction by People of Color	Solaris Books	
2020	Kateri Akiwenzie-Damm, et al.	This Place: 150 Years Retold	Highwater Books	
2020	Victor LaValle, ed.	A People's Future of the United States	One World	
2020	John Joseph Adams, ed.	A People's Future of the United States	One World	
2020	Ken Liu, ed.*	Broken Stars: Contemporary Chinese Science Fiction in Translation	Tor Books	
2020	Dominik Parisien, ed.	The Mythic Dream	Saga Press	
2020	Navah Wolfe, ed.	The Mythic Dream	Saga Press	
2021	Patrice Caldwell, ed.*	A Phoenix First Must Burn	Viking Press	
2021	Zoraida Córdova, ed.	Vampires Never Get Old: Tales with a Fresh Bite	Imprint	
2021	Natalie C. Parker, ed.	Vampires Never Get Old: Tales with a Fresh Bite	Imprint	
2021	dave ring, ed.	Glitter + Ashes: Queer Tales of a World that Wouldn’t Die	Neon Hemlock	
2021	Sheree Renée Thomas	Nine Bar Blues	Third Man	
2021	Joshua Whitehead, ed.	Love After the End: An Anthology of Two-Spirit and Indigiqueer Speculative Fiction	Arsenal Pulp Press	
2022	Charles Payseur, ed.*	We're Here: The Best Queer Speculative Fiction 2020	Neon Hemlock Press	
2022	C. L. Clark, ed.*	We're Here: The Best Queer Speculative Fiction 2020	Neon Hemlock Press	
2022	Alex Hernandez, ed.	Speculative Fiction for Dreamers: A Latinx Anthology	Mad Creek	
2022	Matthew David Goodwin, ed.	Speculative Fiction for Dreamers: A Latinx Anthology	Mad Creek	
2022	Sarah Rafael García, ed.	Speculative Fiction for Dreamers: A Latinx Anthology	Mad Creek	
2022	Alaya Dawn Johnson	Reconstruction	Small Beer Press	
2022	Usman T. Malik	Midnight Doorways: Fables from Pakistan	Kitab	
2022	Isabel Yap	Never Have I Ever	Small Beer Press	
2023	Zoraida Córdova, ed.*	Reclaim the Stars: 17 Tales Across Realms and Space	Wednesday Books	
2023	Kim Fu	Lesser Known Monsters of the 21st Century	Tin House	
2023	Shingai Njeri Kagunda, ed.	Voodoonauts Presents: (Re)Living Mythology	Android	
2023	Yvette Lisa Ndlovu, ed.	Voodoonauts Presents: (Re)Living Mythology	Android	
2023	H. D. Hunter, ed.	Voodoonauts Presents: (Re)Living Mythology	Android	
2023	LP Kindred, ed.	Voodoonauts Presents: (Re)Living Mythology	Android	
2023	Janelle Monáe et al.	The Memory Librarian: And Other Stories of Dirty Computer	Harper Voyager	
2023	Morgan Talty	Night of the Living Rez	Tin House	
2024	Premee Mohamed*	No One Will Come Back for Us	Undertow	
2024	Shane Hawk, ed.	Never Whistle At Night	Vintage Books	
2024	Theodore C. Van Alst, Jr., ed.	Never Whistle At Night	Vintage Books	
2024	Shelly Page, ed.	Night of the Living Queers	Wednesday Books	
2024	Alex Brown, ed.	Night of the Living Queers	Wednesday Books	
2024	Jordan Peele, ed.	Out There Screaming	Random House	
2024	John Joseph Adams, ed.	Out There Screaming	Random House	
2024	Eden Royce	Who Lost, I Found	Broken Eye	
2025	Sonia Sulaiman*	Thyme Travellers: An Anthology of Palestinian Speculative Fiction	Roseway Publishing	
2025	Sarah Coolidge, ed.	Through the Night Like a Snake: Latin American Horror Stories	Two Lines Press	
2025	Indrapramit Das, ed.	Deep Dream: Science Fiction Exploring the Future of Art	MIT Press	
2025	Mariana Enriquez (author)	A Sunny Place for Shady People	Hogarth Press	
2025	Megan McDowell (translator)	A Sunny Place for Shady People	Hogarth Press	
2025	Desiree S. Evans, ed.	The Black Girl Survives in This One	Flatiron Books	
2025	Saraciea J. Fennell, ed.	The Black Girl Survives in This One	Flatiron Books	
2026	Karen Lord	We Will Rise Again: Speculative Stories and Essays on Protest, Resistance, and Hope	Saga	
2026	Annalee Newitz	We Will Rise Again: Speculative Stories and Essays on Protest, Resistance, and Hope	Saga	
2026	Malka Older	We Will Rise Again: Speculative Stories and Essays on Protest, Resistance, and Hope	Saga	
2026	Christopher Caldwell	Call and Response	Neon Hemlock	
2026	André M. Carrington, ed	The Black Fantastic: 20 Afrofuturist Stories	Luna Press Publishing	
2026	Lee Mandelo, ed.	Amplitudes: Stories of Queer and Trans Futurity	Erewhon	
2026	Terese Mason Pierre, ed	As the Earth Dreams: Black Canadian Speculative Stories	Spiderline	
