= Tristan Strong Punches a Hole in the Sky =

2019 children's fantasy and mythology novel by Kwame Mbalia

- First edition
- Author: Kwame Mbalia
- Cover artist: Erik Wilkerson
- Language: English
- Series: Tristan Strong series
- Release number: 1
- Genre: Fantasy, mythology
- Publisher: Disney-Hyperion, Rick Riordan Presents
- Publication date: October 15, 2019
- Publication place: United States
- Pages: 496
- Awards: Children's Africana Book Award; Coretta Scott King Award
- Followed by: Tristan Strong Destroys the World

Tristan Strong Punches a Hole in the Sky is a 2019 middle grade fantasy-adventure novel written by Kwame Mbalia. Published under the "Rick Riordan Presents" imprint, the novel is focused on African American folktales and West African mythology. The story follows teenager Tristan Strong, who is struggling with guilt after his best friend's death. Tristan accidentally creates a rift that transports him to Alke, a parallel world where myths are real, and must survive the evil forces that threaten Alke's people and discover his own abilities.

Like many of the other works in the "Rick Riordan Presents" imprint, the book, which is the first in Mbalia's Tristan Strong series, has been praised for its diverse representation of characters and mythological deities, as well as its plot and character development.

== Synopsis ==
Tristan Strong is a seventh grader from Chicago who is mourning the death of his best friend Eddie, who died in a tragic bus crash. Eddie has left Tristan his journal, in which they collected stories about African American folktales and West African mythology. After Tristan loses his first boxing match, he is sent to Alabama to live with his strict grandparents for the summer and heal from the tragedy.

On his first night in Alabama, Eddie's journal is stolen by a strange doll-like creature covered in sap named Gum Baby. Tristan chases Gum Baby into the Bottle Tree Forest, a haunted forest Tristan's Nana forbid him to go in. In an effort get the journal back, Tristan punches the Bottle Tree, which breaks one of the bottles and unexpectedly opens a portal to a parallel world. Tristan and Gum Baby fall into a world called Alke, where the mythology and folktales in Eddie's journal are real. Tristan and Gum Baby team up to escape the Bone Ships in the Burning Sea and go to the island of MidPass. Tristan meets the MidFolk, including a girl named Ayanna, a rabbit named Chestnutt, and Brer Fox. The people of Alke are being attacked by Fetterlings, or Iron Monsters, living chains that attempt to capture them. Brer Fox dies while fighting for the MidFolk to escape, and Eddie's journal is taken.

The MidFolk go to the Thicket, a safe haven created by Brer Rabbit. Tristan meets Brer Rabbit, John Henry, and winged women Miss Rose and Miss Sarah. Tristan learns that when he punched the Bottle Tree, he opened a rip in Alke and released a haint that made the Fetterlings stronger, and they are looking for him. Brer Rabbit instructs Tristan to close the rip with the help of Anansi. Tristan, Gum Baby, Ayanna, and Chestnutt set out to find Anansi's famed Story Box to draw him out and ask for help. Tristan also discovers that he is an Anansesem; when he tells stories, reality is affected to reenact his words.

The group goes to the Golden Crescent and frees the sky god Nyame, who is trapped in statue form. Nyame reveals that the Story Box was already taken by the Ridgefolk. They travel to the vertical city of Isihlangu, whose people believe the MidFolk have sent the Fetterlings after them. Tristan tells a story and manages to unite the two groups, but they are attacked by the monster Abiyoyo and brand flies. The groups escapes with resident Princess Thandiwe, but Chestnutt is hurt and Ayanna is critically injured. They are met by High John the Conqueror, who wants the Story Box to gain power, but Tristan convinces him to help heal Ayanna and Chestnutt instead. In his dreams, Tristan is visited by a haint who calls himself "Uncle C" and takes away Tristan's memories of Eddie, demanding Tristan bring him the Story Box.

They return to the Golden Crescent, where the MidFolk and Ridgefolk are both facing fetterlings, hull beasts, and brand flies. Tristan goes to the Bone Ships to bargain with their leader, Uncle Cotton. Cotton has Eddie's journal, Tristan's memories, and all the people the fetterlings captured, so Tristan exchanges the Story Box for them. Tristan tricks Cotton and escapes with the Story Box while Cotton in pulled down into the sea. Many of the Alkeans are saved and freed. However, Tristan reveals that Brer Rabbit is really Anansi in the disguise, which he deduced after freeing the real Brer Rabbit from Cotton. Anansi wanted the Story Box for himself to gain power. Nyame makes Anansi repair the rift in the sky before trapping Anansi in the form a cell phone, and orders him to help Tristan refill the Story Box. Tristan returns to Alabama, promising to return one day soon, and starts by telling the story of his own adventure.

== Themes ==
Tristan Strong includes portrayals of African American folktales, West African mythology, the legacy of the Atlantic slave trade. Tristan Strong meets African American folktale characters like Brer Fox, High John the Conqueror, and John Henry. Strong also meets West African deities like Nyame, Mmoatia, and Anansi the Weaver. Most of the book is set in Alke, in the MidPass. Mbalia was introduced to Anansi tales, a major aspect of the novel, by his late father. Tristan's personality was largely inspired by Mbalia's oldest daughter. On Twitter, Mbalia has noted that Tristan experiences "grief and loss, both personal and cultural."

== Reception ==
Kirkus Reviews, in a starred review, called Tristan Strong "a worthy addition to the diverse array of offerings from Rick Riordan Presents." School Library Journal, also in a starred review, said "this debut novel offers a richly realized world, a conversational, breezy style, and a satisfying conclusion that leaves room for sequels." Publishers Weekly, in another starred review, called it a "triumphant middle grade debut." In a review for The New York Times, John Steves praised Mbalia's plot developments as "powerful and surprising," saying that the author "has a good ear for dialogue." The novel was a New York Times best-seller, debuting at No. 8 on the list, and The New York Times named Tristan Strong as one of The 25 Best Children's Books of 2019. In addition, the novel was a 2020 Coretta Scott King Award honor book. The book received a Children's Africana Book Award (CABA) in 2020, for Best Book for Older Readers.

Common Sense Media said about the characterization, "Author Kwame Mbalia has created a highly likable main character in Tristan, who's at first reluctant to be enmeshed in the magical battles but gradually accepts that his help is crucial to the cause" and that "Tristan Strong Punches a Hole in the Sky deserves praise for the ways it pays respect to African cultures, displaying their vitality and continuing relevance," complementing the book's diversity and background. The review also gave the book a four-star rating out of five. A review on Utopia State of Mind said that Tristan Strong Punches a Hole in the Sky "is a story about bravery, grief, and believing in yourself" and "an action packed story that tackles grief, guilt, and the power of stories." Rich in Color praised the character of Gum Baby and the humanization of John Henry in the book as opposed to typic folklore in stories.

== Sequels ==
The sequel to Tristan Strong Punches a Hole in the Sky, Tristan Strong Destroys the World, was published in October 2020, and continues Tristan's adventure. A third installation in the series has been announced. It remained untitled, until February 2021, when it was named Tristan Strong Keeps Punching. The book was released October 5, 2021. Since then, no 4th book in the series has been announced.

== Adaptation ==
A graphic novel adaptation of the book is set to be released on August 9, 2022. The art will be done by Robert Venditti and Olivia Stephens, while Mbalia will remain the author. The book will consist of 128 pages.
