= Syracuse Press Club =

The Syracuse Press Club, based in Syracuse, New York, serves as a 21-county area of central New York. The club is made up of journalists and communications specialists from throughout the Central New York region. The organization is for those who work in print, broadcast, or Internet journalism. The press club is also open to those who work in communications or public relations for corporations, government, or not-for-profit organizations. It is governed by a board of directors, which is elected by its membership on a yearly basis.

== Club history ==
In mid-April 1951, members of the Syracuse Chapter of Sigma Delta Chi, the journalism honorary, met at the former Merchants Bank on South Warren Street. But because only four had shown up, they immediately adjourned to the Waldorf Cafeteria less than a block away. Over coffee, Gene Cowen and Joe Porcello of the Herald-Journal, Ned Ryan, a television photographer, and Morgan Redmore, a former newsman then doing public relations for Solvay Process Company (Allied Chemical), discussed the principal problem of the Syracuse SDX chapter. The problem was what to do about a dispute with national headquarters over a bill for convention expenses which the local chapter maintained it did not owe. Almost simultaneously, Cowen and Redmore suggested the same solution: "Why don't we just tell National we quit, and start our own organization - a press club?"

The Syracuse Press Club was born at that instant.

For many years, the SPC maintained club rooms at the Hotel Onondaga, then at Midtown Plaza, and later at the Hotel Syracuse, where members could socialize and share a few drinks. Those days, unfortunately, are long gone, due in part to economic pressures and the changing nature of the media industry.

The Syracuse Press Club was incorporated July 29, 1954 (although one document shows an Aug. 4, 1954 date). On April 27 of that year, papers were requested from the state Board of Standards and Appeals and filed on July 16. The document was signed by SPC President Richard A. Page, and board members Oley Sheremeta, Collin B. Weschke, Joseph K. Kensin, and Karel (Bud) Vanderveer. The attorney for the club was Maurice H. Sharp.

== Notable guest speakers ==
Over the years, the club held a number of successful dinners, luncheons and other affairs. One of the club's most renowned speakers was Vice President Richard M. Nixon, who spoke at a 1960 dinner at the Hotel Syracuse, attracting a capacity crowd of 722. Other nationally-known speakers included Presidential candidate Ronald Reagan, Governors Nelson Rockefeller and W. Averell Harriman, Senators Barry Goldwater and Ted Kennedy, Rudolph Giuliani, and newsmen Bill Moyers, Richard Valleriani, and Ford Rowan.

== Annual events ==
The Club holds its annual Scholarship and Professional Recognition Awards dinner every May. The Club bestows dozens of awards to print, broadcast and new media journalists for stories and events they covered the previous year. The Club also awards a scholarship to a promising journalism student residing in central New York.

== Wall of Distinction ==
The Wall of Distinction is where outstanding journalists in Central New York are permanently enshrined. The Syracuse Press Club's Wall of Distinction is located in the theater lobby of the John H. Mulroy Civic Center in downtown Syracuse. Over 60 legendary journalists make up the Wall. With help from Onondaga County Executive Nick Pirro, the Wall was placed in the Civic Center building. The first group of inductees was installed on Dec. 4, 2000, formally kicking off the Syracuse Press Club's 50th anniversary observance. In addition to plaques honoring inductees, there is a large plaque commemorating the SPC's 50th anniversary listing the names of the Club's presidents from 1951 to 2001.

== List of Club Presidents ==
- Current:.....Katrina Tulloch (Post-Standard)
- 1951/52......Joseph V. Ganley* (Herald-Journal)
- 1953.........Edward B. Griffin* (Herald-Journal)
- 1954.........Richard A. Page* (WFBL)
- 1955.........Robert M. Hofmann* (Herald-Journal)
- 1956.........Claude (Red) Parton (WSYR)
- 1957.........Howard J. Carroll (Herald-Journal)
- 1958.........Donald C. Fradenburgh (Herald-Journal)
- 1958.........Paul H. Strom* (Post-Standard)
- 1959.........Frederick Hillegas* (WSYR)
- 1960.........Richard J. Hanlon
- 1961.........Joseph A. Porcello (Herald-Journal)
- 1962.........John N. Whitney* (Post-Standard)
- 1963.........Claude (Red) Parton (WNDR)
- 1964.........William D. Cotter (Herald-Journal)
- 1965.........Don Edwards (WSYR)
- 1966.........Glenn Williams* (WNDR)
- 1967.........Selwyn Kershaw* (Herald-Journal)
- 1968.........Leroy Natanson (Post-Standard)
- 1969.........Art Peterson (WFBL)
- 1970.........Philip Hofmann* (Herald-Journal)
- 1971.........Robert Visser* (WNYS)
- 1972.........Harold Addington* (Herald-Journal)
- 1973.........Jules Coleman (WFBL)
- 1974.........Robert Greabell* (Herald-Journal)
- 1975.........A. Brohmann Roth* (Herald-Journal)
- 1976.........Rod Wood (WHEN)
- 1977.........Peter B. Volmes (Post-Standard)
- 1978.........William Crozier (Herald-Journal)
- 1979.........Dick Mastriano (WNDR)
- 1980.........Dexter Blake (WIXT)
- 1981.........James Woolsey* (Post-Standard)
- 1982.........Evelyn Clayton (Herald-Journal)
- 1983.........Ron Hastings (WSYR)
- 1984.........Scott Atkinson (WTVH)
- 1985.........James Woolsey* (Post-Standard)
- 1986.........Andy Brigham (WIXT)
- 1987.........Stan Linhorst (Herald-Journal/Post-Standard)
- 1988/89......Jeff Scheidecker* (WIXT)
- 1990.........Vince Golphin (Herald-Journal)
- 1991/92......Nancy Duffy* (WIXT)
- 1993.........Walt Shepperd (New Times)
- 1993/94......Walter Grunfeld* (Marathon Printing)
- 1995/96......Ken Jackson (Constitution/Urban CNY)
- 1997/98......Jeff Paston (WSTM)
- 1999.........Tracy Carman (Eagle Newspapers)
- 2000/01......Chris Weidman (WSYR)
- 2002/03......Matt Mulcahy (WTVH)
- 2004.........Evelyn Clayton (Post-Standard)
- 2005.........David Tyler (Eagle Newspapers)
- 2006.........Chris Weidman (WSYR)
- 2007.........Lou Gulino (WSTM)
- 2012.........Robert Baker (Post-Standard)
- 2013-2019....Josh Cradduck (Spectrum News)
- 2019-2022....Katrina Tulloch (Post-Standard)
