= Romina Russell =

Argentine writer

Romina Russell (born 1984, in Buenos Aires) is the pseudonym of Romina Garber, an Argentine writer who lives in United States. Her book Zodiac (2014) was a New York Times bestseller in 2016, in the young adult ebook category.

== Biography ==
Originally from Buenos Aires, Argentina, Russell immigrated to the United States with her family when she was five. She was raised in Miami, Florida, and currently resides in Los Angeles, California. She is a graduate of Harvard College.

When she was nine, Russell wrote her first poem, called Si yo fuera la luz. Her Spanish teacher submitted it to a writing contest at the local county fair, and Russell won first place. She later became editor-in-chief at her high school paper. While a student at Harvard, she wrote a weekly Sunday column called "College She Wrote" for the Miami Herald that was later picked up for national syndication.

== Works ==
=== Zodiac Series ===
- Zodiac (2014)
- Wandering Star (2015)
- Black Moon (2016)
- Thirteen Rising (2017)

=== Wolves of No World Series ===
- Lobizona (2020)
- Cazadora (2021)
