= Natalie C. Parker =

Children's literature author

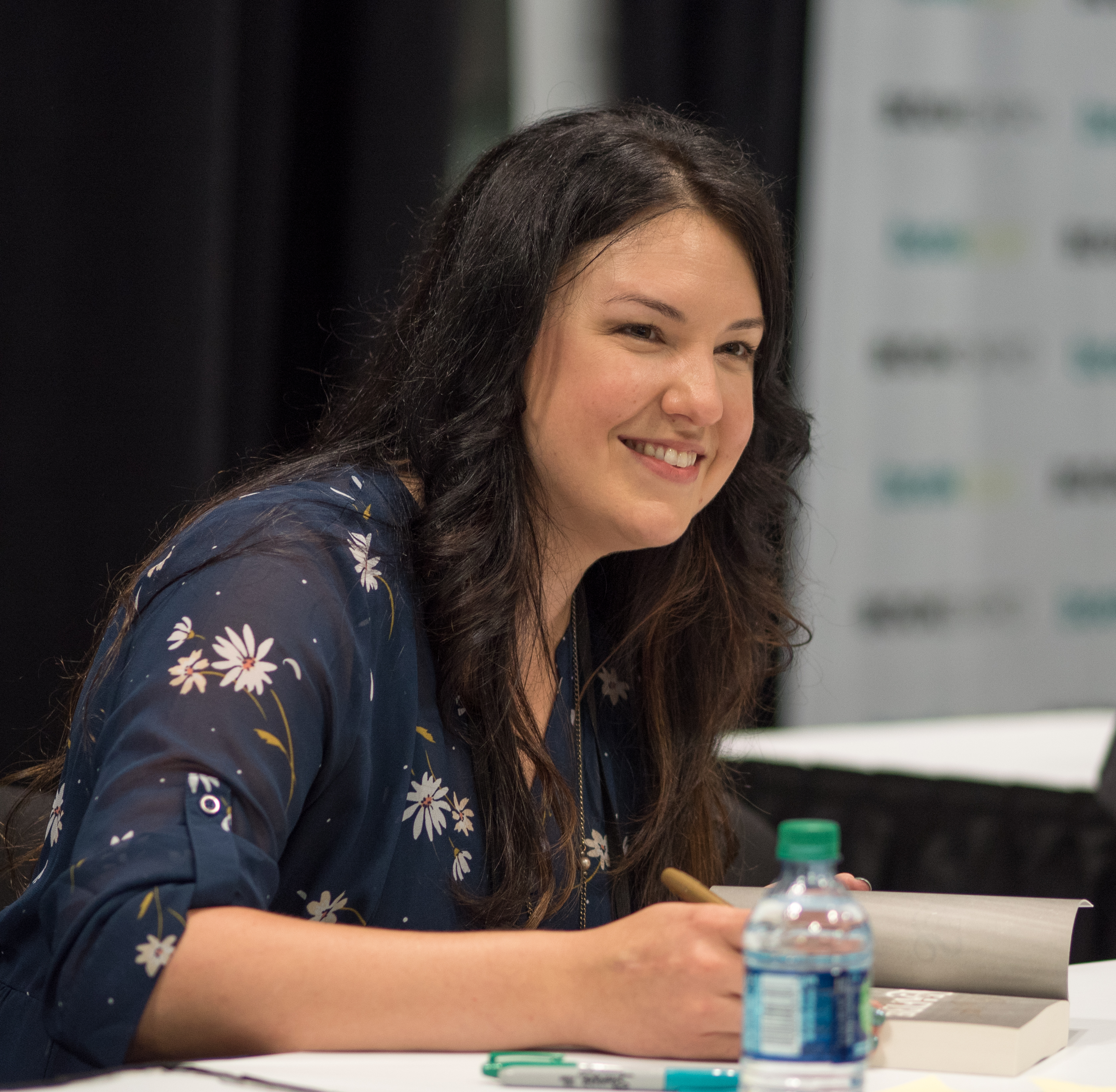
Parker in 2018 at the BookExpo America at the Javits Convention Center in New York City

Natalie C. Parker is an author of young adult and middle grade fiction. She has published two standalone middle grade novels, The Devouring Wolf (2022) and The Nameless Witch (2023), as well as several young adult novels, including the Beware the Wild duology and Seafire trilogy. In 2017, she edited Three Sides of a Heart. Later, she co-edited Vampires Never Get Old (2020), Mermaids Never Drown (2023), and Faeries Never Lie (2024) with Ecuadorian-American author Zoraida Córdova.

== Awards and honors ==
Four of Parker's books are Junior Library Guild selections: Beware the Wild (2014), Seafire (2018), Vampires Never Get Old (2020), and The Assassin's Guide to Babysitting (2025). In 2019, Locus named Steel Tide one of the year's best young adult novels. In 2025, Shelf Awareness named The Assassin's Guide to Babysitting one of the top six young adult books of the year.

Awards for Parker's works
Year	Title	Award	Result	Ref.
2021	Vampires Never Get Old	Ignyte Award for Outstanding Anthology/Collected Works	Finalist	
2024	Come Out, Come Out	Bram Stoker Award for Best Young Adult Novel	Finalist	

== Publications ==
=== Middle grade fiction ===
- Parker, Natalie C. (2022). The Devouring Wolf. New York: Razorbill. ISBN 978-0-593-20395-8.
- Parker, Natalie C. (2023). The Nameless Witch. New York: Razorbill. ISBN 978-0-593-20398-9.

=== Young adult fiction ===
- Parker, Natalie C., ed. (2017). Three Sides of a Heart: Stories About Love Triangles. New York: HarperTeen. ISBN 978-0-06-242447-1.
- Córdova, Zoraida; Parker, Natalie C., eds. (2020). Vampires Never Get Old: Tales with Fresh Bite. New York: Imprint. ISBN 978-1-250-23001-0.
- Córdova, Zoraida; Parker, Natalie C., eds. (2023). Mermaids Never Drown: Tales to Dive For. New York: Feiwel and Friends. ISBN 978-1-250-82381-6.
- Córdova, Zoraida; Parker, Natalie C., eds. (2024). Faeries Never Lie: Tales to Revel In. New York: Feiwel and Friends. ISBN 978-1-250-82384-7.
- Parker, Natalie C. (2024). Come Out, Come Out. New York: Putnam. ISBN 978-0-593-61939-1.
- Parker, Natalie C. (2025). The Assassin's Guide to Babysitting. Candlewick. ISBN 978-1-536-23009-3.

==== Beware the Wild duology ====
- Parker, Natalie C. (2014). Beware the Wild. New York: HarperTeen. ISBN 978-0-06-224152-8.
- Parker, Natalie C. (2016). Behold the Bones. New York: HarperTeen. ISBN 978-0-06-224155-9.

==== Seafire trilogy ====
- Parker, Natalie C. (2019). Seafire. Razorbill. ISBN 978-0-451-47882-5.
- Parker, Natalie C. (2019). Steel Tide. Razorbill. ISBN 978-0-451-47885-6.
- Parker, Natalie C. (2021). Stormbreak. Razorbill. ISBN 978-0-451-47886-3.
