= Tristan Strong series =

Middle grade novel series by Kwame Mbalia

- Tristan Strong Punches a Hole in the Sky (2019); Tristan Strong Destroys the World (2020); Tristan Strong Keeps Punching (2021)
- Author: Kwame Mbalia
- Country: United States
- Language: English
- Genre: Young adult novel, mythology
- Publisher: Disney-Hyperion
- Published: October 15, 2019 – October 5, 2021
- Media type: e-Book; Print
- No. of books: 3

The Tristan Strong series is a mythology book trilogy written by Kwame Mbalia. The series currently consists of three books. The first book, Tristan Strong Punches a Hole in the Sky, was published on October 15, 2019, and the second installment, Tristan Strong Destroys the World, was released a year later on October 6, 2020. Book three, the last in the trilogy, Tristan Strong Keeps Punching, was announced on February 8, 2021, and released on October 5, 2021. All three books are about African-American folktales.

== Premise and setting ==
The Tristan Strong series follows the titular character of Tristan Strong, who "accidentally creates a hole into the Midpass, a world where ancient African gods clash with gods of African-American legend in the first book of a new series by Kwame Mbalia."

== Series overview ==
=== Tristan Strong Punches a Hole in the Sky ===
Following the surprising death in a bus accident of best friend Eddie, reluctant twelve-year-old boxer Tristan Strong travels to Alabama to grieve with his grandparents, bringing some belongings and Eddie's mysterious journal. Once in Alabama, Tristan accidentally opens a portal to a world of folktales and mythology. Tristan meets the deities of the MidPass, who are at war with the Alkean deities. They encounter Fetterlings—sentient, snake-like chains intent on destroying both Alke and MidPass wherever they go since Tristan tore the rip in the sky. After an occurrence in Isihlangu, a city on the side of the cliff, the leader of the monsters, called a Hull Beast, bringing his Brand Flies, attacks and they barely make it out alive, but after escaping with Isilangu resident Thandiwe, Tristan's friend Ayanna is critically injured, so he, Thandiwe, the god High John, and his companions and fellow adventurers Gum Baby and Chestnutt, go to the Golden Crescent to heal her.

They find the Golden Crescent has been taken by the Fetterlings and other monsters; after defeating them all, Tristan is confronted by the one who controls them. He calls himself Uncle C, later revealed to stand for "Cotton" and has Eddie's journal. Tristan agrees to give him the Story Box in exchange for the journal, but tricks him instead and he and Gum Baby banish him. They get the journal, and Tristan is able to talk to Eddie himself before he leaves forever. Finally, they rescue those who the Fetterlings captured, but Anasi, the trickster god, is hiding among them. With the forces of Miss Rose and Miss Sarah, Nyame, High John, Tristan, and John Henry, they are able to trap Anansi's consciousness into a cell phone. Tristan says goodbye to his newfound friends and returns to his family's farm, promising that he would return to Alke and the MidPass one day.

=== Tristan Strong Destroys the World ===
Tristan Strong continues living on his grandfather's farm, practicing his boxing skills and talking with Anansi on his phone. He gets messages from spirits, warning him about someone called "The Shamble Man" until his Nana is taken by monsters. Ninah, a river spirit, confirms this. To return to Alke to find the Shamble Man and Nana, Anansi suggests that Tristan tell a story and use its powers as an Anansesem. He speaks of Keelboat Annie, a woman who pulled her boat through a brutal storm so as to get her passengers to their destinations. Soon enough, he meets Annie, who is with his old friend Ayanna.

== Development ==
The first book was announced in late August 2018, with a release date set for January 2020. This was later moved up to October 2019. A third installment in the series was announced after the release of the first novel, but it remained unnamed until February 2021. A short story by Mbalia about the Tristan Strong characters will be featured in the upcoming anthology book, The Cursed Carnival and Other Calamities. Mbalia's story in the short story anthology will be called "The Gum Baby Files" and feature both Tristan and the titular character in it. A comic book adaptation of Tristan Strong Punches a Hole in the Sky will be published on May 3, 2022, with art by Olivia Stephens and Robert Venditti. It will consist of 128 pages. Audiobook adaptations of the first two books of the Tristan Strong series, narrated by Amir Abdullah, have been released on Audible and Chirp.

== Reception ==
The Laughing Place announced in a review of Tristan Strong Punches a Hole in the Sky that the book "will tear at your heartstrings as it craftily deals with grief and highlights the power of storytelling" and that "Kwame Mbalia has added another treasure to the literary world." Kirkus Reviews said about the book, "Mbalia's African American and West African gods touch on the tensions between the cultures, a cultural nuance oft overlooked. Readers who want more than just a taste of Alke will be eager for future books. Most human characters, like Tristan, are black with brown skin," also saying that it is "a worthy addition to the diverse array of offerings from Rick Riordan Presents." John Stephens of The New York Times said the book was critical of the book's character descriptions but praised the writing, metaphors, and creativity of Mbalia. "Mbalia expertly weaves a meaningful portrayal of family and community with folklore, myth, and history—including the legacy of the slave trade—creating a fast-paced, heroic series starter," as a review on Publishers Weekly claims.

The second book in the series, entitled, Tristan Strong Destroys the World, was released a year after the series debut, having been published on October 6, 2020. The book's rating on Kirkus Reviews is "packs a punch", with the review on the site saying, "Well-paced—just like the previous installment—this sequel focuses on themes such as the meaning of diaspora and the effects of trauma, making for a more nuanced and stronger story than the first." The book's review on Publishers Weekly reads, "Mbalia again skillfully weaves mythological and folktale threads, along the way expanding his world's reach, deconstructing Tristan's role as hero, and examining the communal role of storytelling ... Alternately humorous and heartbreaking, this installment sees Tristan entering a dramatic new chapter of his saga that will leave readers eager for more." On the novel's themes, The Laughing Place says, "The overall theme of Tristan Strong Destroys the World is trauma ... Kwame Mbalia has moved the reader with his wicked sense of humor and the depth of character development he has created in the Tristan Strong series."

== See also ==
- Rick Riordan Presents
