= Hanna Alkaf =

Malaysian author

- Writing career
- Genre: Young adult literature
- Website: https://hannaalkaf.com/

Hanna Alkaf is a Malaysian author. Her books include The Weight of Our Sky, The Girl and the Ghost, and Queen of the Tiles.

== Career ==
Hanna was formerly a journalist. Her first published book, GILA: A Journey Through Moods & Madness, is a non-fiction work about mental health and illness in Malaysia inspired by a story about postpartum depression she covered during her journalism career.

Hanna's debut young adult novel, The Weight of Our Sky, was released in 2019 by Salaam Reads. Set in 1960s Kuala Lumpur, Malaysia during the 13 May riots, it follows Melati, a Malay teenager with obsessive-compulsive disorder who searches for her missing mother when the riots separate them alongside Vincent, a Chinese-Malaysian boy. The book won a 2019 Freeman Award, and was adapted into a webcomic that released on Webtoon.

In 2020, Hanna published The Girl and the Ghost, about a young girl named Suraya who befriends a pelesit that once belonged to her grandmother. She dubs him Pink and they grow close, only for their relationship to sour when Pink becomes violent towards those who he believes have wronged Suraya as well as Suraya's new friend Jing Wei. The Girl and the Ghost was a finalist for the 2020 Kirkus Prize for Young Readers.

Hanna's other books include Queen of the Tiles, about a competitive Scrabble player who discovers a conspiracy behind her friend's death at a tournament the previous year, Hamra and the Jungle of Memories, a Little Red Riding Hood-inspired novel about a girl and a weretiger, and The Hysterical Girls of St. Bernadette's, where the students of an all-female academy experience a phenomenon where girls start randomly screaming then vanishing. In 2026, she released the novella The Warung Between Worlds with the Malaysian publishing house Bookiut.

She is also editor of the anthology The Beasts Beneath The Winds: Tales Of Southeast Asia’s Mythical Creatures, and the co-editor of The Grimoire of Grave Fates alongside Margaret Owen.

== Publications ==
=== Novels ===
- The Weight of Our Sky. Salaam Reads. February 5, 2019. ISBN 978-1534426085.
- The Girl and the Ghost. HarperCollins. August 4, 2020. ISBN 978-0062940957.
- Queen of the Tiles. Salaam Reads/Simon & Schuster. April 19, 2022. ISBN 978-1534494558.
- Hamra and the Jungle of Memories. HarperCollins. March 28, 2023. ISBN 978-0063207950.
- Tales From Cabin 23 #2: Night of the Living Head. HarperCollins. August 27, 2024. ISBN 978-0063283947.
- The Hysterical Girls of St. Bernadette's. Salaam Reads/Simon & Schuster. September 24, 2024. ISBN 978-1534494589.
- The Warung Between Worlds. Bookiut. May 31, 2026. ISBN 978-6294641600.

=== Non-fiction ===
- GILA: A Journey Through Moods & Madness. Gerakbudaya Enterprise. 2016. ISBN 978-9832344582.

=== Anthology contributions ===
- Hanna, Alkaf; Owen, Margaret, eds. (June 6, 2023). The Grimoire of Grave Fates. Delacorte Press. ISBN 978-0593427453.
- Hanna, Alkaf, ed. (October 21, 2025). The Beasts Beneath The Winds: Tales Of Southeast Asia's Mythical Creatures. Illustrated by Jes and Cin Wibowo. Amulet Books/Harry N. Abrams. ISBN 978-1419770098.
- Ali, S.K.; Saeed, Aisha, eds. (May 5, 2020). "Taste". Once Upon an Eid. Amulet Books. ISBN 978-1419740831.

== Awards and honours ==
Year	Title	Award	Result	Reference
2019	The Weight of Our Sky	Freeman Award for Young Adult / High School Literature	Won	
2020	The Girl and the Ghost	Kirkus Prize for Young Readers' Literature	Shortlisted	
2025	The Beasts Beneath The Winds: Tales Of Southeast Asia’s Mythical Creatures	Freeman Award for Young Adult / Middle School Literature	Won	
