= Margaret Owen (author) =

American novelist

- Owen in 2026
- Occupation: Novelist
- Writing career
- Period: 2019 – present
- Genres: Fantasy, Young adult literature
- Notable awards: https://margaret-owen.com/

Margaret Owen is an American author. Her works include The Merciful Crow, The Faithless Hawk, and the Little Thieves series.

== Career ==
Owen's debut novel, The Merciful Crow, was released in 2019. It is a young adult fantasy novel set in a world where people are divided into castes, such Phoenixes, Hawks, and Crows, with Crows being the lowest caste. It follows Fie, a Crow, who must protect a prince and his bodyguard. A sequel, The Faithless Hawk, was published in 2020.

In 2021, she published Little Thieves, the first book in the eponymous series. Based on the fairytale The Goose Girl, it follows Vanja Schmidt, a thief known as the Penny Phantom, who takes over the identity of a princess and then must find a way to avoid her fate after a god inflicts a curse on her that will kill her if she does not atone for her crimes. The series continued with Painted Devils in 2022, which has Vanja become a cult leader, and concluded with Holy Terrors in 2025. Holy Terrors was a finalist for the 2026 Lodestar Award for Best Young Adult Book. The series as a whole was also a finalist for the 2026 Mythopoeic Award for Young Adult Literature.

In 2026, she released Rootbound, a tie-in novel for the Disney film Tangled, which follows Rapunzel and Eugene as they travel to the seclusive kingdom of Astera a month after the events of the film.

She is also the co-editor for the 2023 anthology The Grimoire of Grave Fates alongside Hanna Alkaf.

== Personal life ==
Owen lives in Seattle.

== Publications ==
=== The Merciful Crow ===
- The Merciful Crow. Henry Holt and Co. July 30, 2019. ISBN 978-1250191922.
- The Faithless Hawk. Henry Holt and Co. August 18, 2020. ISBN 978-1250191953.

=== Little Thieves ===
- Little Thieves. Henry Holt and Co. October 19, 2021. ISBN 978-1250191908.
- Painted Devils. Henry Holt and Co. May 16, 2023. ISBN 978-1250831163.
- Holy Terrors. Henry Holt and Co. April 1, 2025. ISBN 978-1250831170.

=== Other Novels ===
- Rootbound: A Tangled Novel. Disney/Random House. July 28, 2026. ISBN 978-1368101042.

=== Anthology Contributions ===
- Hanna, Alkaf; Owen, Margaret, eds. (June 6, 2023). The Grimoire of Grave Fates. Delacorte Press. ISBN 978-0593427453.
- Thor, Rosiee, ed. (September 16, 2025). "Five Times the Wizard Almost Died, and One Time She Did". This Is How We Roll. Page Street YA. ISBN 979-8890033086.
