= Zoraida Córdova =

Ecuadorian-American author (born 1987)

- Born: June 26, 1987 (age 39); Guayaquil, Ecuador
- Education: Hunter College, University of Montana
- Writing career
- Pen name: Zoey Castile
- Language: English
- Years active: 2012-now
- Genres: Young adult fiction, middle grade fiction, romance
- Notable work: Labyrinth Lost
- Website: zoraidacordova.com

Zoraida Córdova is an Ecuadorian-American author of children's books and romance, best known for her Brooklyn Brujas series. She also writes romance as Zoey Castile.

== Personal life ==
Córdova was born in Guayaquil, Ecuador and came to the United States when she was five or six years old. English is her second language.

She grew up in Hollis, Queens. Her favorite books in high school were In the Forests of the Night and Demon in my View by Amelia Atwater Rhodes, which she first read at age 13. Impressed by the fact that Rhodes was published when she was 14, Córdova was inspired to start to want to become a writer as well.

Córdova attended the National Book Foundation’s writing camps in high school, with the help of a supportive teacher, and the Summer Solstice writing conference at Pine Manor college.

She says that she wrote many unfinished stories in college, accumulating multiple "Part 1s", and completed her first novel at age 19. After college, she interned at PMA Literary and Film management, where she first met the person who would become her literary agent.

Córdova identifies as Latina and is one of the co-founders of the Latinx in Kidlit blog, a website centering fellow Latinx writers.

== Selected works ==
Córdova wrote her first query letter to a literary agent when she was 17. She wrote two more novels before writing the novel that ultimately made her able to get literary representation.

The Vicious Deep Series

Córdova wrote what would become her debut novel, The Vicious Deep, as part of the National Novel Writing Month in 2010. It sold to Sourcebooks within a week of submitting.

The Vicious Deep follows Tristan, a boy who gets swept away by a tidal wave and lands on Coney Island, having developed strange powers. It was published by Sourcebooks in August 2012.

Córdova says that she has had an infatuation with the sea ever since she was a child, saying that she had been sent a VHS of The Little Mermaid by her grandmother while still living in Ecuador and started to develop an interest in mermaids. While there is one biracial Ecuadorian and Greek side character in the novel, Córdova says that "it all began in Ecuador" for her. She first had the concrete idea for the novel when she spent a summer in Coney Island.

Two sequels, The Savage Blue and The Vast and Brutal Sea, followed in May 2013 and June 2015.

Brooklyn Brujas Series

Her second young adult series, Brooklyn Brujas (Witches), originally began as a Latinx version of Charmed and has been inspired by Córdova's Ecuadorian heritage. Córdova says that she wanted to write about identity, family, and magic, while being inclusive of people of color, without taking from preexisting mythologies, ultimately creating a fictional pantheon of gods, inspired by many different Latin American cultures. She worked on multiple drafts of what would become the first novel, Labyrinth Lost, for years before it ultimately sold in 2014.

Labyrinth Lost follows Alex, a bruja who hates magic and accidentally makes her entire family vanish when she performs a spell to rid herself of her own magic. It was published by Sourcebooks in September 2016 and received a starred review from School Library Journal. In April 2017, it was announced that Paramount had acquired movie rights to the novel. As of May 2019, the project is still in early development and no producer or writer has been attached yet.

A sequel, Bruja Born, about Lula, the sister of the protagonist of the first book, whose life is turned upside down after a bus crash, was published in June 2018. Córdova says that she didn't feel the story was complete after the first novel and that she didn't want to "mess up" Alex's ending, so chose the point of view of her sister instead, writing a much more "darker" novel in tone than the first.

A third novel in the series was published in 2020. This book, titled Wayward Witch, followed a new character named Rose that was pulled through a portal into the land of Adas. She has to work to try and fix the problems of that land in her attempt to return home.

Star Wars

She wrote the short story "You Owe Me a Ride", included in the short story collection Star Wars: From a Certain Point of View, featuring 40 authors' takes on stories taking place during the first Star Wars film, Star Wars: A New Hope, as told through the perspective of supporting characters. The collection was released in October 2017.

Córdova is also the author A Crash of Fate, a Star Wars canon universe novel released by Disney-Lucasfilm Press in August 2019. It tells the story of Izzy and Jules, two best friends on the run from vengeful smugglers and pirates.

She also wrote the short-story "The Lost Nightsister" included in the short story collection The Clone Wars: Stories of Light and Dark released by Disney-Lucasfilm Press in 2020.

Other works

She also writes romance under the pen name Zoey Castile, most notably her Magic Mike-inspired Happy Endings series about male strippers falling in love.

In October 2018, it was announced that she would be co-editing a young adult fantasy anthology featuring called Vampires Never Get Old together with author Natalie Parker, featuring stories by authors Samira Ahmed, Julie Murphy, Rebecca Roanhorse, Laura Ruby, and Victoria Schwab. Publication is planned for fall 2020.

Her middle grade debut, The Way to Rio Luna, about an eleven-year-old who finds a book that transports him to a fairyland, was announced in October 2019 and planned for publication with Scholastic in summer 2020.

== Bibliography ==
=== As Zoraida Córdova ===
Adult

The Inheritance of Orquídea Divina (Atria Books, 2021)

Young adult

Vicious Deep Series

1. The Vicious Deep (Sourcebooks, 2012)
2. The Savage Blue (Sourcebooks, 2013)
3. The Vast and Brutal Sea (Sourcebooks, 2014)

Brooklyn Brujas Series

1. Labyrinth Lost (Sourcebooks, 2016)
2. Bruja Born (Sourcebooks, 2018)
3. Wayward Witch (Sourcebooks, 2020)

Star Wars Canon Universe

- Star Wars: Galaxy's Edge: A Crash of Fate (Disney-Lucasfilm Press, 2019)
- Star Wars: The High Republic: Convergence (Del Rey, 2022)
- Star Wars: The High Republic: Beware the Nameless (Del Rey, 2024)

Hollow Crown Series

1. Incendiary (Disney Hyperion, 2020)
2. Illusionary (Disney Hyperion, 2021)

Middle Grade fiction

- The Way to Rio Luna (Scholastic, 2020)
- Valentina Salazar Is Not a Monster Hunter (Scholastic, 2022)

Romance

- Kiss the Girl (Penguin Random House, 2023)

On the Verge Series

1. Luck on the Line (Diversion Books, 2014)
2. Love on the Ledge (Diversion Books, 2015)
3. Life on the Level (Diversion Books, 2016)

Short Stories

- "You Owe Me a Ride" in Star Wars: From a Certain Point of View, edited by Elizabeth Schaefer (Del Rey, 2017)
- "Luz, Queen of Los Luceros" (Hanging Garden, 2017)
- "Divine Are the Stars" in Toil & Trouble: 15 Tales of Women & Witchcraft, edited by Jessica Spotswood and Tess Sharpe (Harlequin Teen, 2018)
- "The Lost Nightsister" in Star Wars: The Clone Wars: Stories of Light and Dark (Disney-Lucasfilm Press, 2020)
- "Confessions of an Ecuadorkian" in Come On In, edited by Adi Alsaid (Inkyard Press, 2020)
- "Vampires Never Say Die" in Vampires Never Get Old, (Imprint, 2020)
- Fantastic Worlds: Impossible Places (Random House Children's, 2021)

As Editor

- Vampires Never Get Old (Imprint, 2020), with Natalie C. Parker
- Reclaim the Stars (Wednesday Books, 2022)
- Mermaids Never Drown (Feiwel and Friends, 2023), with Natalie C. Parker and Darcie Little Badger
- Faeries Never Lie (Feiwel and Friends, 2024), with Natalie C. Parker

=== As Zoey Castile ===
Novels

Happy Endings Series

1. Stripped (Kensington, 2018)
2. Hired (Kensington, 2019)
3. Flashed (Kensington, 2019)

Stand Alones

- The Captive Merman's Promise (Peculiar Tastes #5, 2022)

Short Stories

- Rogue Passion (Rogue Passion Publishing, 2018)
- "Love in Spanglish" and "The Great Holiday Escape" in Amor Actually (Adriana Herrera Publishing, LLC, 2021)
