= List of mythology books and sources =

This article is a list of books and sources about myths, legends and Folklore

== General Mythology ==
- Acquainted With the Night by Christopher Dewdney (2004)
- The Golden Bough by Sir James George Frazer (1890)
- Gods and Fighting Men by Lady Augusta Gregory (1904)
- The Hero with a Thousand Faces - by Joseph Campbell (1949) (comparative mythology)
- The Hero's Journey by Joseph Campbell (1990) (comparative mythology)
- In the Light of Truth: The Grail Message, by Oskar Ernst Bernhardt (1931)
- Lemprière's Bibliotheca Classica, by John Lemprière (1788)
- Man and His Symbols by Carl Jung (1960)
- Mythology by Edith Hamilton (1942)
- Myths and Reality by Mircea Eliade (translated from French) (1963)
- Myths to Live By by Joseph Campbell (1972)
- The Power of Myth by Joseph Campbell (1988)
- The White Goddess by Robert Graves (1948, expanded 1966)
- Worlds in Collision by Immanuel Velikovsky (1950) (comparative mythology)

Derivative works:

- American Gods by Neil Gaiman (2001)
- Modern Disciples series by I.S. Anderson (2011) (Fiction Based on several different mythologies)

== Australian Mythology ==
- The Songlines by Bruce Chatwin (1987)

== Celtic Mythology ==
- The Mythology of the British Islands by Charles Squire (1905)
- The Religion of the Ancient Celts by J. A. MacCulloch (1911)
- The Fairy-Faith in Celtic Countries by W. Y. Evans-Wentz (1911)
- Myths and Legends of the Celtic Race by T. W. Rolleston (1911)
- A Celtic Miscellany by Kenneth Hurlstone Jackson (1972)
- Tales of the Celtic Otherworld by John Matthews (1998)
- Celtic Mythology by Philip Freeman (2017)

=== Ireland ===
- Fairy Legends and Traditions of the South of Ireland by Thomas Crofton Croker (1825)
- A Bunch of Shamrocks by E. Owens Blackburne (1879)
- Old Celtic Romances by Patrick Weston Joyce (1879)
- Ancient Legends, Mystic Charms and Superstitions of Ireland by Jane Wilde (1888)
- Myths and Folk-lore of Ireland by Jeremiah Curtin (1890)
- Silva Gadelica by Standish Hayes O'Grady (1892)
- West Irish Folk Tales and Romances by William Larminie (1893)
- Heroic Romances of Ireland by A. H. Leahy (1905)
- Gods and Fighting Men by Lady Gregory (1905)
- Irish Fairy Tales by James Stephens (1920)
- Ancient Irish Tales by Tom Peete Cross (1936)
- Lebor Gabála Érenn by R.A. Stewart Macalister (1938-1956)
- Irish Sagas by Myles Dillon (1968)
- Early Irish Myths and Sagas by Jeffrey Gantz (1982)
- Tales of the Elders of Ireland by Ann Dooley (2008)

=== Wales ===
- The Myvyrian Archaiology of Wales by Owen Jones (1801-7)
- Cambrian Superstitions by William Howells (1831)
- Mabinogion by Lady Charlotte Guest (1838)
- The Four Ancient Books of Wales by W. F. Skene (1858)
- The Cambrian Sketch-Book by R. Rice Davies (1875)
- British Goblins by Wirt Sikes (1880)
- Welsh Folk-Lore by Elias Owen (1896)
- Celtic Folklore by John Rhys (1901)
- The Welsh Fairy Book by William Jenkyn Thomas (1908)
- Folk-Lore and Folk-Stories of Wales by Marie Trevelyan (1909)
- Folk-Lore of West and Mid-Wales by Jonathan Ceredig Davies (1911)
- Enchanted Wales by Miranda Aldhouse-Green (2025)

=== Scotland ===
- Popular Tales of the West Highlands by John Francis Campbell (1860)
- Notes on the Folk-Lore of the North-East of Scotland by Walter Gregor (1881)
- Folk and Hero Tales by James MacDougall (1891)
- Folklore of Scottish Lochs and Springs by James M. Mackinlay (1893)
- Carmina Gadelica by Alexander Carmichael (1900)
- Superstitions of the Highlands and Islands of Scotland by John Gregorson Campbell (1900)
- Scottish Fairy and Folk Tales by George Douglas (1900)

== Chinese Mythology ==
Derivative works:

- Where The Mountain Meets the Moon by Grace Lin (2009)
- Daughter of the Moon Goddess by Sue Lynn Tan (2022)

== Egyptian Mythology ==
Derivative works:

- The Kane Chronicles by Rick Riordan (2010-2012)
- The Chaos of Stars by Kiersten White (2013)

== Greek Mythology ==
- The Greek Myths by Robert Graves (1955)
- Gods and Heroes of Ancient Greece by Gustav Schwab (1837)
- Gods, Heroes and Men of Ancient Greece by W. H. D. Rouse (1934)
- Bulfinch's Mythology (originally published as three volumes) by Thomas Bulfinch (1855)
- Mythology by Edith Hamilton (1942)
- Myths of the Ancient Greeks by Richard P. Martin (2003)
- The Penguin Book of Classical Myths by Jenny March (2008)
- The Gods of the Greeks by Károly Kerényi (1951)
- The Heroes of the Greeks by Károly Kerényi (1959)
- A Handbook of Greek Mythology by H. J. Rose (1928)
- The Complete World of Greek Mythology by Richard Buxton (2004)
- Metamorphoses by Ovid, published ca. 8 AD
- Theogony by Hesiod, published 7-8th century BC
- The Iliad by Homer, written 7-8th century BC
- The Odyssey by Homer, written 7-8th century BC
- The Homeric Hymns by Anonymous, written 4-7th century BC

Derivative works:

- Tanglewood Tales by Nathaniel Hawthorne (1853)
- Wonder-Book for Girls and Boys by Nathaniel Hawthorne (1852)
- Goddess of Yesterday by Caroline B. Cooney (2002)
- Percy Jackson & the Olympians series by Rick Riordan (2005-2009)
- The Penelopiad by Margaret Atwood (2005)
- The Heroes of Olympus series by Rick Riordan (2010-2014)
- Starcrossed by Josephine Angelini (2011)
- The Song of Achilles by Madeline Miller (2011)
- Trials of Apollo series by Rick Riordan (2016-2020)
- Circe by Madeline Miller (2018)
- The Silence of the Girls by Pat Barker (2018)
- A Thousand Ships by Natalie Haynes (2019)
- Lore by Alexandra Bracken (2021)
- Lore Olympus by Rachel Smythe (2021)
- Percy Jackson and The Olympians by Rick Riordan (2015-)

== Hindu Mythology ==
- Dictionary of Hindu Lore and Legend by Anna L. Dallapiccola (2002)
- Mahabharata A modern retelling by Ramesh Menon
- Ramayana by Ramesh Menon

Derivative works:

- The Immortals of Meluha by Amish Tripathi (2010)
- The Day of Brahma by Stefania Dimitrova (2017)
- Pandava Quintet by Roshani Chokshi (2018-2022)

== Japanese Mythology ==
Derivative works:

- The Shadow of the Fox by Julie Kagawa (2018)

== Korean Mythology ==
Derivative works:

- Dragon Pearl by Yoon Ha Le (2019)

== Mayan Mythology ==
Derivative works:

- The Storm Runner by J. C. Cervantes (2018)
- Gods of Jade and Shadow by Silvia Moreno-Garcia (2019)

== Mandaean Mythology ==
- Ginza Rabba
- Mandaean Book of John

== Meitei Mythology ==
- And That Is Why . . . Manipuri Myths Retold
- The Tales of Kanglei Throne

== Norse Mythology ==
- Poetic Edda,"collection", 13th century
- Prose Edda, Snorri Sturluson, 13th century
- The Heroes of Asgard by Annie Keary and Eliza Keary (1857)
- Norse Mythology by Rasmus B. Anderson (1876)
- Teutonic Mythology by Viktor Rydberg (1886-9)
- Legends of Norseland by Mara L. Pratt-Chadwick and A. Chase (1894)
- Scandinavian Folk-Lore by William Craigie (1896)
- Asgard Stories by Mary H. Foster and Mabel H. Cummings (1901)
- In the Days of Giants by Abbie Farwell Brown (1902)
- Told by the Northmen by E. M. Wilmot-Buxton (1908)
- Myths of the Norsemen by H. A. Guerber (1909)
- Stories from Northern Myths by Emilie K. Baker (1914)
- The Children of Odin by Padraic Colum (1920)
- Norse Mythology by Neil Gaiman (2017)

Derivative works:

- The Blackwell Pages Trilogy by K.L. Armstrong and M.A. Marr (2013-2015)
- Magnus Chase and the Gods of Asgard by Rick Riordan (2015-2017)
- The Witch's Heart by Genevieve Gornichec (2021)

== Roman Mythology ==
- Aenid by Virgil

Derivative works:

- Lavinia by Ursula K. Le Guin (2008)
- The Heroes of Olympus series by Rick Riordan (2010-2014)

== Turkish Mythology ==
- Book of Dede Korkut (9th century)

== United States Mythology ==
- Fearsome Creatures of the Lumberwoods
- Native American Legends of the Great Lakes and the Mississippi Valley

== Internet web resources ==
- Encyclopedia Mythica (internet encyclopedia)

== See also ==
- List of world folk-epics
