= Pandava Quintet =

Book series by Roshani Chokshi

The Pandava Quintet
- Aru Shah and the End of Time (2018); Aru Shah and the Song of Death (2019); Aru Shah and the Tree of Wishes (2020); Aru Shah and the City of Gold (2021); Aru Shah and the Nectar of Immortality (2022)
- Author: Roshani Chokshi
- Cover artist: Abigail Dela Cruz
- Country: United States
- Language: English
- Genre: Fantasy, mythology
- Publisher: Disney Hyperion
- Published: March 27, 2018 - April 5, 2022
- Media type: Print (hardcover and paperback), audiobook, e-book
- No. of books: 5

Pandava Quintet is a five-part book series written by Roshani Chokshi. It is part of the "Rick Riordan Presents" publishing imprint. The first book of the series and the imprint was published on March 23, 2018, under the name Aru Shah and the End of Time. The next books are Aru Shah and the Song of Death, Aru Shah and the Tree of Wishes, Aru Shah and the City of Gold, and Aru Shah and the Nectar of Immortality. The main character of the series is the young Aru Shah, who is disliked by her classmates, but fits in with the other Pandava sisters, like Mini and Brynne, once she meets an enchanted talking pigeon who she nicknames "Boo" after touching a cursed ancient artifact. The rest of the series has gotten praise for being similar to Rick Riordan's Percy Jackson and the Olympians series.

== Series overview ==
=== Aru Shah and the End of Time ===
In Atlanta, Georgia, misfit Aru Shah shows some rude kids from her school a mystical lamp in her mother's museum that she says is cursed, though the kids don't believe her. To save her reputation, Aru lights the lamp, releasing something and freezing everyone nearby, including the kids and Aru's mother. A talking pigeon named Subala arrives, telling her that she has awakened the Sleeper, a mythical creature in Hindu mythology who can freeze time. Subala tells Aru that she is a mythical Pandava. Aru nicknames him Boo and he takes her to find the other Pandava sibling who has been awakened. They meet Mini, an anxious girl who is already familiar with the Pandavas. Upon visiting the majestic Council of Guardians in the Otherworld, both Aru and Mini are claimed by their soul fathers, Aru's being Indra (the god of rain, thunder, and storms) and Mini's being Dharma Raja (the god of death).

The "soul sisters", as they are dubbed, are given a quest to stop the Sleeper from awakening the Lord of Destruction, who will bring an end to all of Time. Aru and Mini must venture into the Kingdom of Death after they find the three keys that will grant them entry. The only items they are given to complete the quest are a golden ball (Aru) and a purple compact mirror (Mini).

Over the course of their journey, the sisters must fight demons while running from the Sleeper. In search of the second key, they go to the Night Bazaar, where the Sleeper ambushes them. The Sleeper takes Boo hostage and reveals that Boo is actually Shakuni, who served as an antagonist to the Pandavas long ago during the Mahabharata War. To free Boo, Aru and Mini will have to hand over all three keys to the Sleeper. Mini, upset after learning Aru lied to her, decides to continue the quest alone. After releasing the mounts of the Gods, Aru catches up with Mini and they begin working together again. After retrieving all three keys, the sisters enter the Kingdom of Death, where they face guard dogs, a lonely Illusion Palace, the Bridge of Forgetting, as well as other challenges. Aru gets cursed along the way, but the sisters manage to get their celestial weapons, a lightning bolt (Aru) and the danda stick (Mini).

Aru develops a plan to defeat the Sleeper with the help of the godly mounts. Though the Sleeper manages to escape after a fierce battle, Boo assures Aru that the Sleeper did not free Shiva (the Lord of Destruction) in time, so they won. Time resumes and Aru and Mini start training. On their day off, the sisters see a third Pandava sister, who transforms from a giant wolf to a girl to a blue bird, on the street holding a golden bow.

=== Aru Shah and the Song of Death ===
Aru Shah, and Mini fend off Zombies in the Night Bazaar, wherein Aru notes that the zombies have something over their hearts. The two see Brynne, their other Pandava sister and a doppelgänger of Aru, who steals a golden bow and arrow from Brynne, before disappearing. Brynne gets officially Claimed by Lord Vayu and gets a mace that can alter wind direction. She is convinced Aru is there, and attacks her, knocking her unconscious. She awakens in the council, with her other sisters, including school classmate Aiden, son of an apsara. Even with evidence, the council are not convinced that the Pandavas are innocent, and task them with retrieving the bow and arrow. They each are granted mystical items for the quest, and Aru gets a vial of ideas. They decide to visit Kamadeva, the God of Love, who owns the bow and arrow. While going there, Aru learns that Aiden's mother gave up her position as an apsara, to marry Aiden's father, but they are now getting a divorce. Aiden secretly blames himself. When they meet Kamadeva, he initially suspects them as the thieves, but gradually trusts them. He reveals that, while the arrow can join hearts, it received a darker power from his wife's, Rati, sorrow. It can now rip out hearts, and the affect will become permanent after a while. Anyone who has enchantment knowledge can carve out their soul song to use the weapons. He cannot help them directly, however he reveals that the location of the thief can be revealed through the soul song, which is in the nāga treasury, if they speak the thief's name over it. They must stab them with the arrow, once it is revealed, thus cleansing the weapons of its dark power, and returning the Heartless to normal. He also gives them Rishi Durvasa's business card.

They travel to the Nāga realm, wherein Aru learns that Brynne is half asura, enabling her to shape-shifting, and is therefore discriminated by almost everyone. They reach the Nāga realms entrance, but Aru is separated from the group. She finds her way to the palace of Varuna and Varuni, the sea gods. Varuni foretells Aru's near future, before she and her friends are reunited, and they fend off a large crab monster. Varuni and Varuna allow them to use a secret passage into the Nāga treasure. However, they are greeted by three nāginis, who claim to know the thief's name. Mini gives herself up for the name, and, although the others try and stop it, Mini is kidnapped and drained of her energy. The nāginis claim that Mini is safe in Ushas and Ratri's world and leave behind a Heartgem that belongs to Uloopi, the naga queen. She used the jewel to save Arjuna, but Takshaka stole it, thus making her age. Aru and Brynne briefly fight, before reconciling. Mini interacts with them in their dreams, causing them to believe that Rishi Durvasa can help them. They enter the naga treasury, wherein they are attacked by Takshaka, the guard of the treasury. He is angry at Aru, who he believes is still Arjuna, for burning down his home. He is allied with the Sleeper, and let the thief, who is female, to steal the bow and arrow. The trio quickly discover Takshaka is affected by musical sound frequencies, and Aiden uses this by playing music on his phone. Aru finds the soul song, but Takshaka overcomes the music by destroying the phone. They are almost killed, before Takshaka's grandson, Rudy, intervenes, and hypnotizes him, using music, and lets the Pandavas escape. They visit Rishi Durvasa, who refuses to help them at first, but then shows them an entrance to the Dreamworld. There, they find and rescue Mini, and return. Mini reveals that the thief is Shurpanakha. It is revealed through the soul song that she is in the Ocean of Milk and is planning to use the Heartless to steal Amrita, the nectar of immortality. While the quartet journey to the Ocean, they are tested by Agni, whose insatiable hunger is finally satisfied by Aru's gift, and they are joined by Hiri, a shapeshifter.

They sneak inside Lanka, where the Amrita is kept. They are discovered by Shurpanakha, who is called Lady M by her followers. The Pandavas are taken aback by her slowly fading beauty, and kindness. She says she is stealing the nectar, because her true story is fading. Her true name is Meenakshi, and she wanted to be remembered for her triumphs. She was used as a scapegoat in the War, but she doesn't want to be remembered as that, and the Amrita can help with it. She tries to persuade them into joining her, but when they refuse, she turns Aiden into a Heartless, and unleashes the others on them. Aru, using Hira's abilities, tricks them into giving her the bow and arrow, before stabbing Lady M, which releases a song of death. Takshaka flees during the pandemonium. Lady M speaks her final words, before dying. The Heartless return to normal. The Pandavas are held in court, where Takshaka tries to incriminate them, but fails. Aru returns Uloopi's jewel, and Uloopi has Takshaka arrested. It is revealed later that be escapes. They later return the bow and arrow to Kamadeva. Aru is approached in her sleep by two twins, who claim that she is "her", and that she will save them next year.

=== Aru Shah and the Tree of Wishes ===
Aru Shah, and her soul sisters, along with friend Aiden, attempt to rescue two twins from a ferris wheel. One of the twins is a clairvoyant, about to foretell a Great Prophecy relating to the War between devas and asuras but are however delayed from the attempt by a rakshasa. Together, they defeat it. They meet twins Sheela and Nikita. Sheela can foretell the future, while Nikita can control plants. They claim they are Pandavas, although there is initial skepticism from the others. As to find out more about the Sleeper, they carry the demon through a quicker way, known as a Dead Zone, to Amaravati. It becomes apparent that normal mortals refuse to believe in magic, and therefore ignore it. They enter the Zone, however, the people who are banished there attempt to flee with them, causing the rakshasa to wake. Sheela speaks the Prophecy, which the rakshasa hears. It escapes afterward. The twins later get claimed by their soul fathers. The Council of Guardians, concerned, visit Lanka, the City of Gold, as the Prophecy mentions a false treasure. The Prophecy mentions a "tree at the heart", which causes the Pandavas to believe it refers to the titular Tree of Wishes. They visit the garden where it is kept, but Nikita reveals it is a fake, and that the real tree, or a hint to its location, is kept in the Crypt of Eclipses, where there lie secrets, which is inside the House of Months. They decide to go on a quest to find the real tree. Since they need a key to open it, they decide to visit Vishwakarma, god of architects first. The quest is kept secret from all others, except Subala the pigeon, as they were forbidden from helping the devas. Aru is unexpectedly visited by a Nāga prince unknown as Rudy, who insists on joining the quest, and claims he can get them an audience with Vishwakarma.

They visit Vishwakarma, who, after hearing their request, warns them that a key to unlock any lock needs to be alive, and live things demand answers. It is revealed that the Sleeper once tried to find the Tree, but it is unclear whether he succeeded in reaching it. He was changed after the experience, though, and left "parts of himself" along the way. The Pandavas sneak inside the House of Months, and sneak past Rahu and Ketu. Yalis, keepers of the Crypt, are initially suspicious, as they can sense their celestial weapons, but agree to take them to the Crypt. The Pandavas find a wooden bird, with its voice broken, which holds a memory of the Sleeper. Aru accidentally drops it, and Rudy tries to catch it, unwittingly setting off an alarm. It is revealed that the Yalis have the pillar that contains Narasimha, the wrathful avatar of Vishnu. Aru bargains with the Yalis, and they narrowly escape Narasimha. The bird she was holding calls out to Garuda, who initially suspects them of stealing it, since Rudy is a naga. They are saved by Boo. He converts it into a message, which can only be deciphered by chakora birds. Boo reveals that the Sleeper kidnapped Sheela, which impacts the group deeply. He also says Nikita is in the custody of the moon God. They travel to the chakora forest, where they meet Sohail, a chakora bird who is rejected by others for his tendency to fall in love with luminous objects. The birds agree to decipher the message, for each one of their secrets, which they force them to say. The birds also reveal they know who Aru is, and give her the memory of the Sleeper, wherein he names her. The birds unveil a riddle.

They go up to the moon realm, as the riddle mention roots, which leads them to believe that Nikita might have the answer. They retrieve her, and are left on a supermarket, where there are magical plants. Nikita speaks to them, and they find out that the tree is in Atlanta, in a floating island. While on the way there, Nikita and Aru reconcile. The Sleeper ambushes them with his army. The other Pandavas rescue Sheela, while Nikita and Aru flee to the Tree of Wishes, where Aru leaves Nikita behind to protect her. Aranyani, owner of the Tree, warns her of the price, and gives her the final memory of the Sleeper. She also reveals that Boo made a bargain with the Sleeper to protect them, which hurts Aru deeply. Aru is conflicted, and her morality is heavily affected. Aru makes a wish, however, which is wiped clean from her memory. She pays the price of the Wish immediately, as she is taken by the Sleeper. She awakens chained, and meets Kara, a girl who claims to be the Sleeper's other daughter.

=== Aru Shah and the City of Gold ===
The book begins where the last book ended; with Aru meeting her supposed biological sister Kara. Aru is shocked by the revelation, as it implies her father, the Sleeper, cheated on her mother, or that her mother kept Kara a secret from her, but both do not appear to be the case. Kara also claims she is a Pandava, but Aru is skeptical as there are only five Pandavas. Kara is dubious as well, as the Sleeper wiped the memory of her past from her mind, so she does not know who her parents are, but claims that the Sleeper is not a bad person. Aru does not believe her. Kara claims that she was starting to become uncomfortable, as the Sleeper sometimes called her his "secret weapon". Kara also says that she wants to help Aru escape, although with the condition that she take her with Aru. Aru is extremely disoriented but agrees to let Kara come along. Kara frees Aru and the two escape. While making their escape, Aru notes Kara's desperation for approval, proudness, and intense knowledge of cultures, especially Hindu mythology. A rakshasa tries to stop them from leaving, but they manage to evade it.

They manage to make it back to Earth and reach Brynne, Mini, and Aiden, who reveal that she has been missing for two months. All travel from the Otherworld has been stopped, due to the Sleeper. Nikita and Sheela are therefore separated from them, but are reunited with their parents. Aru's mother is not there, since she has been searching for Aru. They also reveal that Lord Kubera is denying the Pandavas access to the nairratas, elite Hindu warriors, without testing them. Aru also reveals that Boo betrayed them, which they don't believe, and explains the situation of Kara. The three of them doubt Kara, Brynne especially is extremely ferocious to her. They travel to the location of the golden road, which would lead them to Lanka, but subsequently get trapped by vanaras, who want to put them, as human representatives, on trial for the atrocities done against their race by humans. As they are about to execute Aru, who they assume to be the ringleader, they are stopped by Queen Tara, Vali's wife. Queen Tara explains that she cannot help them, as the oceans will reject anything from their shores, but Aru manages to outwit the ocean, using mirrors. In response, Aru is granted a boon by Queen Tara.

They journey to Lanka, where they leave Kara behind, as Lord Kubera will not allow her entry. Lord Kubera reveals that he has been holding Urvashi and Hanuman captive, and the Sleeper has been trying to negotiate with him, to ensure that Lord Kubera will not allow the Pandavas access to the nairratas in the war, and that he will grant them the antima astra, the shard of the world destroying Brahmastra. He also gives them proof that Boo is supposedly with the Sleeper. This makes Brynne even more ferocious, and she begins to become even more unkind to Kara. Lord Liberal states that, while he could grant the Sleeper his wishes, he would give them both the Astra and the nairratas if they pass his tasks. The Pandavas face the trials, and at the second one, Kara is stabbed, but she survives, albeit being comatose for a long time. After completing the third task, they return to Lanka, where the Sleeper's army attacks. Boo dies trying to protect them, but is later reincarnated as a Phoenix-like baby bird. The Nairrata army helps them overpower the Sleeper's army, and, they win. When they get back to Lanka, Kubera gives them full control of the Nairratas, and gives them possession of the antima astra.

While celebrating Aru's birthday, the Sleeper attacks, but Aru's mother intervenes. He then reveals to Kara that she is the sixth Pandava, born to a young Krithika Shah, who put her in stasis to reserve her reputation, and because she felt that she wasn't ready for a baby. This hurts Kara, and the Sleeper manages to convince her to join him. She steals the Antima Astra from Aru and uses it to destabilize all the other Pandavas celestial weapons, before leaving with the Sleeper. Aru is hurt but remembers the boon Agni granted her

== Characters ==
- Aru Shah (books 1–5) is the protagonist of the series. She is the biological daughter of The Sleeper and the soul daughter of Indra, the god of rain, thunder, and storms. She is the reincarnation of the Pandava Arjuna and wields a lightning bolt named Vajra.
- Mini Kapoor-Mercado-Lopez (books 1–5) is a smart but anxious Pandava sister and the soul daughter of Dharma Raja, the god of death. She meets Aru in the beginning of End of Times. She is the reincarnation of the Pandava Yudhishthira and wields a Death Danda named Dee Dee.
- Brynne Rao (books 2–5) is a shape-shifting Pandava with asura lineage and the soul daughter of Vayu, the god of wind. She joins the heroes in book two to help them find the god of love's bow and arrow. She is the reincarnation of the Pandava Bhima and wields a wind mace called Gogo.
- Nikita Jagan and Sheela Jagan (books 3–5) are twin pandavas who are the soul daughters of the Ashvins, the twin gods of health and medicine. They are the reincarnations of the Pandavas Nakula and Sahadeva respectively. Sheela is prophetic and provides the team (dubbed "The Potatoes") with knowledge of the future.
- Aiden Acharya (books 2–5) is the son of an Apsara, a friend of Brynne and a "Pandava-adjacent". He is the reincarnation of Draupadi, the wife of the Pandavas, and wields a camera, which he names Shadowfax, as well as a pair of scimitars which he uses as weapons.
- Kara (books 4–5) is the half-sister of Aru. She is the adopted daughter of The Sleeper and the soul daughter of Surya, the god of the sun. Though initially at odds with the characters because of her father, she joins their group in book four. She is the reincarnation of Karna, the unknown brother of the Pandavas and wields a trident called Sunny.
- Prince Rudra of Naga-Loka (books 1–5), also known as Rudy, is a Naga companion of the Pandavas, the Grandson of Takshaka, a descendant of Ulupi and Aiden's cousin. He possesses little knowledge of human society.
- Boo (books 1–4) is a talking pigeon. His full name is Subala. He is a friend and mentor to the Pandava sisters. He later betrays them to the Sleeper, surprisingly, but only to protect them. He later reincarnates as a firebird, whom the Pandavas dub "BB," for "Baby-Boo." His true identity is that of Shakuni, the maternal uncle of the Kauravas.
- The Sleeper (books 1–5), also known as Suyodhana, is the father of Aru and Kara and the main antagonist of the series. He was awakened by Aru unwittingly in the beginning of book one. His true identity is that of Duryodhana, the eldest among the Kauravas.
- Lady M (book 2) is the main antagonist of Song of Death and the thief who stole the god of love's bow and arrow. Her true identity was that of the rakshasi Meenakshi. She was killed by Aru.
- Hanuman (books 1-5), as himself (Hanuman) from Hindu Mythology. He is one of the Pandavas' gurus.
- Urvashi (books 1-5), as herself (Urvashi) from Hindu Mythology. She is one of the Pandavas' gurus, and Aiden's mother's cousin.
- Garuda (books 3-5), based on the bird king Garuda from Hindu Mythology. He is on the Council of Guardians, and meets the Pandavas in Great Smoky Mountains National Park, on their third adventure.
- Jambavan (book 5), known as the fierce bear king. He is on the Council of Guardians, and meets the Pandavas on their quest to obtain the Syamantaka Jewel (or the sun jewel) to stop the Sleeper from gaining immortality.

== Development ==
The series is told through the third-person omniscient past tense. Film rights to the first novel were sold to Paramount Pictures in 2018 after the book was published, with Karen Rosenfelt set to produce. The series focuses mostly on Hindu mythology in India. In June 2020 the cover to the fourth installment in the series, Aru Shah and the City of Gold, was revealed. A short story by Chokshi about the Pandava characters was featured in the anthology book, The Cursed Carnival and Other Calamities. In September 2017, Lurie and Riordan announced that the first novel in the imprint would be Aru Shah and the End of Time by Roshani Chokshi and that it would release in March 2018. Entertainment Weekly likened the series to Riordan's Percy Jackson series and the Sailor Moon franchise.

== Reception ==
Kirkus Reviews stated that "Chokshi spins a fantastical narrative that seamlessly intertwines Hindu cosmology and folklore [...] for an uproarious novel for young readers" and presented an interesting and unique type of culture that often is inaccurately represented. Goodreads accepted the series to rave reviews; most of the reviewers said that they were excited for the series. Aru Shah and the End of Time was reviewed also by Publishers Weekly, who compared it to Riordan's own writing, saying that the novel "expertly channels the humor and action that have made Riordan’s own work so successful". The character development and worldbuilding in the series has also been well received.

While writing about the second book, Aru Shah and the Song of Death, Kirkus Reviews complemented the complexity and morality of the characters. The book was widely well received and was released to rave reviews. About the book, Kirkus Reviews further said, "Chokshi seamlessly weaves Indian cosmology and pop culture into a refreshingly feminist plot laced with witty dialogue. The most compelling feature of the novel, however, is the complexity of its characters, who, despite their divinity or semidivinity, are at their core very human." Laughing Place praised the specific character of Aru Shah, saying "Part of what makes [the Pandava Quintet] so enjoyable is Aru Shah. She has that sarcastic wit and the silly antics that make any reader laugh and smile" and "Chokshi seamlessly blends Hindu mythology into a modern world. By putting a human face on the legends and myths that have been around for thousands of years, she provides us with a modern-day story that shows kids struggling with the world they live in. Readers get to understand and deepen their connection with Aru and Mini, are introduced to Aiden and Brynne, and learn to empathize with the villains like Lady M."

According to the review website Kirkus Reviews, the third book, Aru Shah and the Tree of Wishes was "touching, riotously funny, and absolutely stunning." About the book's themes and writing, The Nerd Daily has commented, "Aru struggling with her place in the group and her responsibilities once again as for the first time, she really begins to think about right and wrong and whether she should be fighting for the devas or not," also saying, "Chokshi’s writing is bright and beautiful and crackling with wit, it’s nothing short of magical; she blends Hindu mythology and folklore into a contemporary setting in a way that seems effortless." Laughing Place called the book "a hilarious, action-packed adventure that makes readers empathize with the teen characters as they struggle to find their place in the world while dealing with the decisions and repercussions of the adults in their lives."

The fourth book in the series, Aru Shah and the City of Gold, also received praise, like its predecessors, with Kirkus Reviews saying "Chokshi’s ability to craft stories of adventure, humorous dialogue, strong South Asian female characters, and Hindu cosmology is pure magic. With each entry, the series expands into deeper and richer experiences, delving into more complex themes of friendship and family without sacrificing any of the clever banter." Bill Gowsell of Laughing Place said "[the author] gives life to these kids and endows them to be wise and understanding to some complex emotional issues that many adults have failed to grasp. What makes Aru Shah and the City of Gold so compelling is that this friendship of the six contains dialogue that is real and genuine. Chokshi offers action packed adventure but gives readers a chance to see inside the mindset of a teenager."
