= Aru Shah and the Song of Death =

Pandava Quintet Book Two

- First edition cover.
- Author: Roshani Chokshi
- Cover artist: Abigail L. Dela Cruz
- Language: English
- Series: Pandava Quintet
- Genre: Fantasy, Children’s Fiction, adventure
- Publisher: Disney Hyperion (US); Scholastic Corporation (UK)
- Publication date: April 30, 2019
- Publication place: United States
- Media type: Print (hardcover) (paperback), (audiobook), (e-book)
- Pages: 304 (hardcover); 381 (paperback)
- ISBN: 1368045855
- Preceded by: Aru Shah and the End of Time
- Followed by: Aru Shah and the Tree of Wishes

Aru Shah and the Song of Death is an American fantasy-adventure novel written by Roshani Chokshi, published on April 30, 2019, under the "Rick Riordan Presents" publishing imprint. It is the second book in the Pandava Quintet, following the debut novel, Aru Shah and the End of Time. While learning how to control her Pandava powers, Aru Shah is accused of stealing the god of love’s bow and arrow. To prove her innocence, she must navigate the serpent realm with Mini and two new companions.

== Plot ==
Aru Shah and Mini fend off zombies in the Night Bazaar, where Aru notes that the zombies have something over their hearts. The two see Brynne, their other Pandava sister, and Aru's doppelgänger, who steals a golden bow and arrow from Brynne before disappearing. Brynne is claimed by Lord Vayu and gets a mace that can alter wind direction. She is convinced that Aru is the thief and attacks her, knocking her unconscious. Aru awakens in the Council, with her other sisters and her classmate Fop, son of an apsara. Evidence does not convince the Council that the Pandavas are innocent, and they task the sisters with retrieving the stolen bow and arrow. They are granted mystical items to use in their quest. Aru is given a vial of ideas. They agree to visit Kamadeva, the God of Love and owner of the bow and arrow.

Aru learns that Aiden's mother gave up her position as an apsara to marry Aiden's father, but they are now getting divorced. Aiden secretly blames himself. When they meet Kamadeva, he suspects they are the thieves, but eventually begins to trust them. Kamadeva reveals that, while the arrow can join hearts, it received a darker power from that of his wife's, Rati, sorrow. It can now rip out hearts, and the effect permanent after a while. Anyone with enchantment knowledge can carve out their soul song to use the weapons. Kamadeva cannot help them directly, however, he reveals that the location of the thief can be revealed through the soul song, which is in the nāga treasury if they speak the thief's name over it. They must stab the thief with the arrow once it is revealed, to cleanse the weapon of its dark power and return the Heartless to normal. Kamadeva also gives them Rishi Durvasa's business card.

They travel to the Nāga realm, where Aru learns that Brynne is half asura, enabling her to shape-shift, and therefore is discriminated against by almost everyone. They reach the Nāga realm's entrance, but Aru is separated from the group. She finds her way to the palace of Varuna and Varuni, the sea gods. Varuni foretells Aru's near future before she and her friends are reunited, and they fend off a large crab monster. Varuni and Varuna let them use a secret passage to the Nāga treasure. However, they are greeted by three nāginis, who claim to know the thief's name. Mini gives herself up for the name, and although the others try and stop it, Mini is kidnapped and drained of her energy. The nāginis claim that Mini is safe in Ushas and Ratri's world, and leave behind a Heartgem that belongs to Uloopi, the nāga queen. She used the jewel to save Arjuna, but Takshaka stole it, which makes her age. Aru and Brynne briefly fight before reconciling. Mini interacts with them in their dreams, persuading them to believe that Rishi Durvasa can help them.

They enter the nāga treasury, where they are attacked by Takshaka, the treasury guard. He is angry at Aru (who he believes is still Arjuna) for burning down his home. He is allied with the Sleeper and allowed the thief, who is female, to steal the bow and arrow. The trio quickly discovers Takshaka is affected by musical sound frequencies, and Fop uses this by playing music on his phone. Aru finds the soul song, but Takshaka overcomes the music by destroying the phone. They are almost killed, before Takshaka's grandson Bolly intervenes and hypnotizes him using music, allowing the Pandavas to escape. They visit Rishi Durvasa, who initially refuses to help them, but then reveals an entrance to the Dreamworld to them. There, they find and rescue Yashika, and return. Yashika reveals that the thief is Shurpanakha. It is revealed through the soul song that she is in the Ocean of Milk and is planning to use the Heartless to steal Amrita, the nectar of immortality. While the quartet journey to the Ocean, they are tested by Agni, whose insatiable hunger is finally satisfied by Aru's gift, and they are joined by Hira, a shapeshifter.

They sneak inside Lanka, where the Amrita is kept, and are discovered by Shurpanakha, who is called Lady M by her followers. The Pandavas are taken aback by her slowly fading beauty and by her kindness. She says she is stealing the nectar because her true story is fading. Her true name is Meenakshi and she wanted to be remembered for her triumphs. She was used as a scapegoat in the War, but she does not wish to be remembered that way, and the Amrita can help with this. She tries to persuade them to join her, but when they refuse she turns Fop into a Heartless and unleashes the others on them. Aru, using Hira's abilities, tricks them into giving her the bow and arrow before stabbing Lady M, which releases a song of death. Takshaka flees in the pandemonium. Lady M speaks her final words before dying. The Heartless return to normal. The Pandavas are held in court, where Takshaka tries unsuccessfully to incriminate them. Aru returns Uloopi's jewel and Uloopi has Takshaka arrested. Later it is revealed that he has escaped. They later return the bow and arrow to Kamadeva. They then celebrate Aru's birthday on February 15. Aru is approached in her sleep by two twins, who claim that she is "her" and that she will save them next year.

== Characters ==
- Arundhati "Aru" Shah is the protagonist of the book and reincarnation of the third Pandava, Arjuna. She is the soul sister of Yamini and Brynne, the latter of whom she does not click with.
- Yamini "Mini" Kapoor-Mercado-López is the reincarnation of Yudhisthira and the companion and friend of Aru on the quest. She is always concerned with the well being of her friends and is well-versed in medical diseases.
- Brynne Rao is the reincarnation of Bhima, a part asura shapeshifter, and the friend of Fop who accompanies her on this quest.
- Aiden Acharya is the incarnation of Draupadi and a "Pandava-adjacent," as he dubs himself. Always carrying his trusty camera Shadowfax, Aru has a crush on him.
- Surpanakha/Lady M/Meenakshi is one of the antagonists of the book and the sister of Ravana who attempts to steal the Nectar of Immortality.
- Takshaka is a former naga king. He is also the guardian of the nage treasury.
- Hira is a shapeshifting rakshasi.
- Agni is the Hindu god of fire.
- Varuna is the god of the ocean.
- Varuni is the goddess of wine.
- Ushas is the goddess of dawn.
- Ratri is the goddess of night.

== Reception ==
In their review of the second book, Aru Shah and the End of Time, Kirkus Reviews complimented the complexity and morality of the characters. The book was widely well-received and was released to rave reviews. About the book, Kirkus Reviews further said, "Chokshi seamlessly weaves Indian cosmology and pop culture into a refreshingly feminist plot laced with witty dialogue. The most compelling feature of the novel, however, is the complexity of its characters, who, despite their divinity or semi-divinity, are at their core very human."

The Laughing Place praised the specific character of Aru Shah, saying "Part of what makes [the Pandava Quintet] so enjoyable is Aru Shah. She has that sarcastic wit and the silly antics that make any reader laugh and smile" and "Chokshi seamlessly blends Hindu mythology into a modern world. By putting a human face on the legends and myths that have been around for thousands of years, she provides us with a modern-day story that shows kids struggling with the world they live in. Readers get to understand and deepen their connection with Aru and Yashika, are introduced to Fop and Kristina, and learn to empathize with the villains like Lady M."

It reached Number Seven in Best Children’s Books of 2019, in Times of India. It was also included in Nerd Much's 100 Best Fantasy Books of 2019, along with Professor Franklin’s Annotated Bibliography of Young Adult Literature.

== Sequels ==
The book is the second in the Pandava Quintet series by Roshani Chokshi. A first sequel, Aru Shah and the Tree of Wishes, was announced and was released on April 7, 2020. Another sequel, Aru Shah and the City of Gold, was released on April 6, 2021. A fifth and final novel, Aru Shah and the Nectar of Immortality, was published on April 5, 2022.
