= Aru Shah and the End of Time =

Pandava Quintet Book One

- First edition cover
- Author: Roshani Chokshi
- Cover artist: Abigail L. Dela Cruz
- Language: English
- Series: Pandava Quintet
- Genre: Fantasy, Children’s Fiction, adventure
- Publisher: Disney Hyperion (US); Scholastic Corporation (UK)
- Publication date: March 27, 2018
- Publication place: United States
- Media type: Print (hardcover and paperback), audiobook, e-book
- Pages: 368
- ISBN: 1368012353
- Followed by: Aru Shah and the Song of Death

Aru Shah and the End of Time is a 2018 American-fantasy-adventure novel written by Roshani Chokshi and published in March 2018 by Disney-Hyperion. It is the first of many "Rick Riordan Presents" imprint books, and focuses on twelve-year-old Aru Shah who doesn't fit in at school and often stretches the truth to please her friends, but discovers her Pandava sisters, and the very real world of Hindu mythology. The novel received critical acclaim, with critics praising the story, the tone, the humor, and the characters.

== Synopsis ==
Aru Shah is a twelve-year-old girl, living in the Museum of Ancient Indian Art and Culture, who often stretches the truth to please her friends, a trait developed due to her mother's distant behavior. She has a wide imagination and is ashamed to be living in a museum. While she is at home during school break, three of her classmates arrive at the museum to find that Aru lied about spending her time in France. Under pressure, she lights the Cursed Lamp of Bharata to prove them wrong, since she once told her class the Lamp is cursed. She accidentally releases the Sleeper, a demon who can freeze time. After time is frozen in her town and Aru herself is briefly frozen, a pigeon enters the museum and explains that Hindu mythology is real and that she is a Pandava. They leave to find the other known sister. Expecting a fierce warrior, they are both taken back by germophobic Yamini (Mini). Afterward, they visit the Council of Guardians, where they meet Urvashi and Hanuman. Hanuman reveals that the vahanas of the gods have gone missing and that the places where the Sleeper walked have frozen. Both of the sisters are claimed. Indra is Aru's soul father, while Dharma Raja is revealed to be Mini's.

The Pandavas, accompanied by the pigeon (nicknamed 'Boo') are tasked with stopping the Sleeper from awakening The Lord of Destruction, who will bring an end to all of Time. They have to find their celestial weapons by going into the Kingdom of Death, which can only be entered by finding the Three Keys: The Sprig of Youth, the Bite of Adulthood, and a Sip of Old Age. Indra gives a ping-pong ball to Aru while Mini is given a compact by Dharma Raja. They go on the quest with Boo. During the quest, Aru and her companions learn more about themselves and the Hindu Gods. They grow closer and eventually become friends. They also find out that Aru's ping-pong ball carries celestial light and Mini's compact has the ability to create or break illusions. They are attacked by several demons, like Bhasmasura (from whom they get the Sprig), and also grant Valmiki a day of their lives in exchange for a mantra for safety. The Sleeper attacks them various times during their journey. Once the Pandavas acquire protection from the Seasons, they are once again attacked by the Sleeper in the Library of the Night Bazaar, where they find the Bite of Adulthood.

There, the Sleeper reveals that Boo is actually Shakhuni, an enemy to the Pandavas during the Mahabharata War. He captures Boo, saying that in exchange for his freedom, they must give their weapons to him once they acquire it. Mini leaves Aru when she hears the truth, intending to finish the quest herself. Aru discovers that the Sleeper left behind a cage, which contains clay figures. The clay figures, once exposed to celestial light, become the vahanas of the Gods. They thank her for freeing them, and say that she can call them in emergencies. Uchchaihshravas gives her a ride to the location of the Sip. There, she is reunited with Mini. Collected, the Keys open the Door to Death, and they enter the Kingdom. After tricking the Guardian Dogs, Ek and Do, they go on to meet the Palace of Illusions, a living palace who was once the home for the Pandavas. The sentient palace tests them to find out if they are indeed Pandavas, and Aru has to escape an illusion within her mind. Their memories are nearly stolen by a Hindu deity, but Aru kills him by using his own power against him. He curses Aru that she will forget what she needs in an important time. After journeying deep into the Kingdom, they find out that their gifts, the ping-pong ball and the compact, are the weapons. Aru and Mini witness a vision that reveals the Sleeper as Aru's absent father, which complicates Aru's feelings about destroying him. They return to Earth. There, Aru summons the vahanas, and develops a plan to assault the Sleeper. It nearly works. However, as Aru is poised to kill the Sleeper with Vajra, she doubts her decision for enough time for the Sleeper to make his escape. Boo, who has been rescued, explains the Sleeper had to wake Shiva at the full moon, which has passed, indicating that they saved the world. In the aftermath of the crisis, Aru and Mini continue school. They discover they have three more sisters out in the world.

== Characters ==
- Arundhati "Aru" Shah is the protagonist of both the book and the series. She is a Pandava reincarnation and the birth daughter of the Sleeper and Kirthika P. Shah, a museum collector. She does not fit it at school, and causes the Sleeper to be freed while showing off a "cursed" lamp in the museum to kids at school. Her soul father is Indra.
- Yamini "Mini" Kapoor-Mercado-Lopez is a companion of Aru in the book and a germaphobe who is also a reincarnated Pandava. She worries about her friends' health and safety. Her soul father is the Dharma Raja.
- Boo/Subala is Aru and Mini's guide to the Otherworld. He is really the Pandavas’ former foe Shakuni who is cursed to take the form of a pigeon in order to help them.
- The Sleeper/Suyodhana is Aru's birth father and the main antagonist of the series. He is freed by Aru accidentally, beginning Aru's introduction to her Pandava life, and threatens to end time forever.
- Urvashi is the Chief Apsara and a member of the Council of Guardians.
- Hanuman is a monkey-faced Hindu demigod and a member of the Council of Guardians.
- Madame Bee Asura/Bhasmasura was a strong and powerful asura who had the power to turn anyone into ashes by touching their head.
- Valmiki is a sage who wrote the Ramayana.
- The Ritus are the Hindu spirits of the six seasons in the Indian calendar.
- Ek and Do are the two dogs who guard the entrance to the Kingdom of Death. Ek and Do respectively mean one and two in Hindi.
- Chitrigupta is the record keeper of the Kingdom of Death.
- Shukra is the guardian of the Bridge of Forgetting.
- Krithika P. Shah is Aru's mother who is also a Panchakanya. She is the curator of the Indian Museum of Art and Culture. Later revealed as the reincarnation of Kunti in Aru Shah and the City of Gold being Aru's and Kara's mother.
- Arielle Reddy, Burton Prater and Poppy Lopez are Aru's classmates.

== Reception ==
Aru Shah and the End of Time received 3/5 stars from Common Sense Media, which stated that it was a "Flawed but fascinating modern spin on Indian mythology", citing "problems with the storytelling". The book has been listed as one of the "Best Books to Read If You Love Harry Potter" by Oprah Magazine. Rick Riordan said that the book "had everything I like. Humour, great characters and awesome mythology!" Eoin Colfer, author of Artemis Fowl said a "new star was born."

Aru Shah and the End of Time received praise from the Scripps Spelling Bee 2022 Champion & Saris to Suits Writer Harini Logan writing " I opened the book and after a few sentences, I knew witty, incredibly funny Aru and I would hit it off very well."

Reader's Digest said that "This is Percy Jackson meets Sailor Moon." The Library Thing gave it 5 stars, saying the book was "fresh. And great." Kirkus Reviews wrote that "in her middle grade debut, Chokshi spins fantastical narrative of feminism and mythology that everyone, including children of Indian origin, will like." The book was also nominated for the 2019 Nebula Award.

== Sequels ==
In April 2019 a sequel, Aru Shah and the Song of Death, was released, and continues Aru's story. It was just over 300 pages. A third installment, Aru Shah and the Tree of Wishes was published in May 2020, and a fourth book, entitled Aru Shah and the City of Gold was released on April 6, 2021. A fifth and final book, Aru Shah and the Nectar of Immortality, was released on April 5, 2022.

== Adaptations ==
In April 2018 it was announced that Paramount Pictures had purchased the film rights to Aru Shah and the End of Time, beating out one of its competitors, Netflix. Karen Rosenfelt has been named as one of the film's producers. Headed by Riordan, the film will be Hollywood's first Hindu mythology project ever. About the film's potential, Chokshi also said that it will "inspire a whole new audience of readers to feel as though they have seen themselves and make them excited about the world inside of the book as well" and that it could begin a new franchise. Paramount Pictures compared the story with The Wizard of Oz and Coco.
