= Aru Shah and the Tree of Wishes =

Pandava Quintet Book Three

- First edition cover
- Author: Roshani Chokshi
- Language: English
- Series: Pandava Quintet
- Genre: Fantasy, mythology
- Publisher: Disney-Hyperion
- Publication date: April 7, 2020
- Publication place: United States
- Pages: 400 pages (hardback); 315 (ebook)
- ISBN: 9781368013857
- OCLC: 1126350678
- Preceded by: Aru Shah and the Song of Death
- Followed by: Aru Shah and the City of Gold

Aru Shah and the Tree of Wishes is a fantasy mythology book published by Disney-Hyperion on April 7, 2020, under the "Rick Riordan Presents" publishing imprint. It is the third book in the Pandava Quintet and was written by author Roshani Chokshi. It revolves around the titular character Aru Shah as she adventures in a world of Hindu mythology with her friends and fellow Pandava sisters.

== Plot ==
Aru Shah, and her soul sisters, along with friend Aiden, attempt to rescue two twins from a ferris wheel. One of the twins is a clairvoyant, about to foretell a Great Prophecy relating to the War between devas and asuras, but are however delayed from the attempt by a rakshasa. Together, they defeat it. They meet twins Sheela and Nikita. Sheela can foretell the future, while Nikita can control plants. They claim they are Pandavas, although there is initial skepticism from the others. As to find out more about the Sleeper, they carry the demon through a quicker way, known as a Dead Zone, to Amaravati. It becomes apparent that normal mortals refuse to believe in magic, and therefore ignore it. They enter the Zone, however, the people who are banished there attempt to flee with them, causing the rakshasa to wake. Sheela speaks the Prophecy, which the rakshasa hears. It escapes afterward. The twins later get claimed by their soulfathers.

The Council of Guardians, concerned, visit Lanka, the City of Gold, as the Prophecy mentions a false treasure. The Prophecy mentions a "tree at the heart", which causes the Pandavas to believe it refers to the titular Tree of Wishes. They visit the garden where it is kept, but, Nikita reveals it is a fake, and that the real tree, or a hint to its location, is kept in the Crypt of Eclipses, where there lies secrets, which is inside the House of Months. They decide to go on a quest to find the real tree. Since they need a key to open it, they decide to visit Vishwakarma, god of architects first. The quest is kept secret from all others, except Subala the pigeon, as they were forbidden from helping the devas. Aru is unexpectedly visited by a Nāga prince unknown as Rudy, who insists on joining the quest, and claims he can get them an audience with Vishwakarma. They visit Vishwakarma, who, after hearing their request, warns them that a key to unlock any lock needs to be alive, and live things demand answers. It is revealed that the Sleeper once tried to find the Tree, but it is unclear whether he succeeded in reaching it. He was changed after the experience, though, and left "parts of himself" along the way.

The Pandavas sneak inside the House of Months, and sneak past Rahu and Ketu. Yalis, keepers of the Crypt, are initially suspicious, as they can sense their celestial weapons, but agree to take them to the Crypt. The Pandavas find a wooden bird, with its voice broken, which holds a memory of the Sleeper. Aru accidentally drops it, and Rudy tries to catch it, unwittingly setting off an alarm. It is revealed that the Yalis have the pillar that contains Narasimha, the wrathful avatar of Vishnu. Aru bargains with the Yalis, and they narrowly escape Narasimha. The bird she was holding calls out to Garuda, who initially suspects them of stealing it, since Rudy is a nāga. They are saved by Boo. He converts it into a message, which can only be deciphered by chakora birds. Boo reveals that the Sleeper kidnapped Sheela, which impacts the group deeply. He also says Nikita is in the custody of the moon God. They travel to the chakora forest, where they meet Sohail, a chakora bird who is rejected by others for his tendency to fall in love with luminous objects. The birds agree to decipher the message, for each one of their secrets, which they force them to say. The birds also reveal they know who Aru is, and give her the memory of the Sleeper, wherein he names her. The birds unveil a riddle.

They go up to the moon realm, as the riddle mention roots, which leads them to believe that Nikita might have the answer. They retrieve her, and are left on a supermarket, where there are magical plants. Nikita speaks to them, and they find out that the tree is in Atlanta, in a floating island. While on the way there, Nikita and Aru reconcile. The Sleeper ambushes them with his army. The other Pandavas rescue Sheela, while Nikita and Aru flee to the Tree of Wishes, where Aru leaves Nkkita behind to protect her. Aranyani, owner of the Tree, warns her of the price, and gives her the final memory of the Sleeper. She also reveals that Boo made a bargain with the Sleeper to protect them, which hurts Aru deeply. Aru is conflicted, and her morality is heavily affected. Aru makes a wish, however, which is wiped clean from her memory. She pays the price of the Wish immediately, as she is taken by the Sleeper. She awakens chained, and meets Kara, a girl who claims to be the Sleeper's other daughter.

== Characters ==
- Aru Shah is the main character of the series and the soul daughter of Indra.
- Mini is a germaphobe and the second Pandava introduced in the books.
- Brynne Rao is the food-loving, shape shifting part-asura third Pandava.
- Nikita is the fourth Pandava sister and the twin sister of Sheela who is found by the others in the book and later appears in their dreams when she is not able to accompany them in real life.
- Sheela is the fifth and final Pandava sister. She can see the future, and delivers prophecies to the others. In the beginning, she is tasked with not revealing secrets to the enemy.
- Aiden Acharya is the "Pandava-adjacent" friend of Brynne and the other Pandavas, and a possible love interest of Aru. He wields two scimitars and is obsessed with his camera, Shadowfax.
- The Sleeper is the birth father of Aru and the main antagonist of the series. In the book, his second daughter, Kara, is seen in the very last chapter.
- Prince Rudra 'Rudy' of Naga-Loka is a friend of Aru and the Pandavas who accompanies them on their quest. His full name being Prince Rudra of Naga-Loka, he has no knowledge of human culture and is amazed by it.

== Reception ==
Kirkus Reviews rated the book with rave reviews, saying it was "touching, riotously funny, and absolutely stunning." Nerd Daily praised the book through a length review, giving it 10 out of 10 stars, and saying, "Chokshi’s writing is bright and beautiful and crackling with wit, it’s nothing short of magical. She blends Hindu mythology and folklore into a contemporary setting in a way that seems effortless; the Hindu culture is richly rendered, and I love how she is able to pull the reader deep into the mythological tales without ever being obvious or preachy about it. The pacing is superb, and Chokshi knows just where to end a chapter to keep the reader turning pages, fully engrossed in the story."

The Laughing Place praised the book, saying "At 400 pages, Aru Shah and the Tree of Wishes is not a light read, but once you start, you won’t stop until you turn the last page. This book gets a solid four Tree of Wishes out of four for clever character development by brilliantly adding depth to the well-established characters in the middle of a five-book series." Common Sense Media rating the book four out of five stars. Hurn Publications called Chokshi's writings "a brilliantly paced, funny quest adventure that incorporates a wide variety of Hindu culture," also saying that "the book keeps a good pace with lots of action and character development."

== Sequels ==
The book is the third in the Pandava Quintet series by Roshani Chokshi. A first sequel, Aru Shah and the City of Gold, has been announced and will be released on April 6, 2021. A fifth novel, revealed to be titled Aru Shah and the Nectar of Immortality, will be published in April 2022.
