= The Star-Touched Queen =

2016 young adult novel

- Cover of the 2016 Macmillan edition
- Author: Roshani Chokshi
- Language: English
- Publisher: St. Martin's Griffin
- Publication date: 2016
- ISBN: 978-1-250-08547-4 (first edition, hardcover)
- LC Class: PZ7.1.C54 St

The Star-Touched Queen is a 2016 young adult novel by Roshani Chokshi. It received several positive reviews from the press.

Princess Mayavati is the bookish teenaged daughter of the Raja of Bharata. To prevent war, she marries Amar, mysterious Raja of the eerily empty kingdom Akaran, only reachable through the magical Night Bazaar.

The book is a romance, and the fantastic setting draws on Greek mythology and Indian folklore.
