= Aranya Devi Temple, Arrah =

Hindu temple in Bihar, India

Aranya Devi Temple
- Maa Aranya Devi
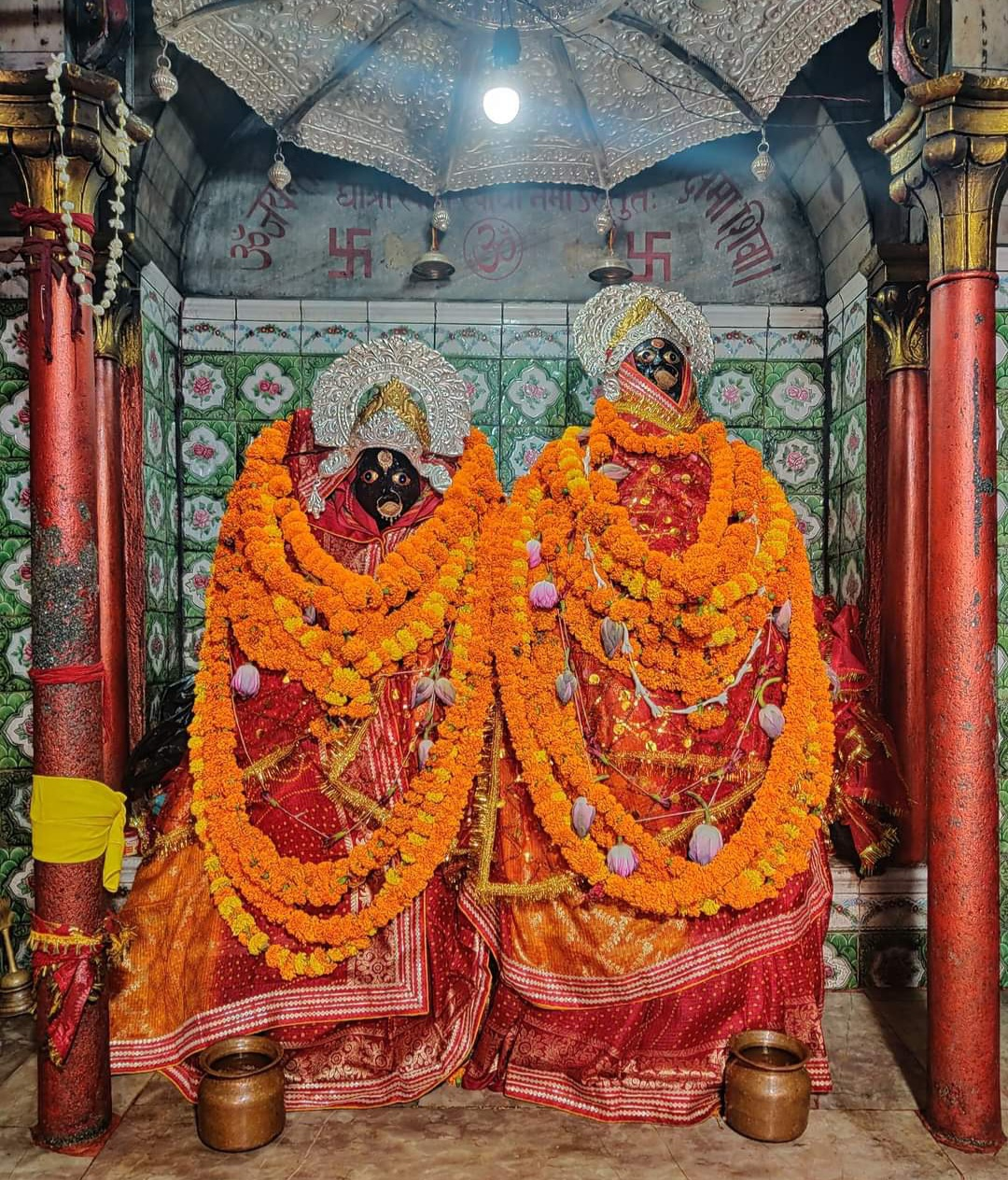
- Maa Aranya Devi in 2023

- Position in Bihar

Religion
- Affiliation: Hinduism
- District: Bhojpur
- Deity: Aranyani (believed)

Location
- Location: Arrah
- State: Bihar
- Country: India
- Coordinates: 25.5678967°N 84.6729917°E

Website
- Aranya Devi Temple Official Website

Aranya Devi Temple is a Hindu temple located in Arrah of Bihar, India. Ara, the headquarters of Bhojpur district is named after the goddess of this temple. The Hindu goddess worshipped here is considered to be the presiding deity of the city and the deity of the people there.

According to Devi Bhagavata Purana, this temple, recognized from Satya Yuga to Kali Yuga, is also a Siddh Pitha along with 108 Shakti Pithas. The temple was established in 2005. It is associated with the Mahabharata period. It is also linked to the context of Rama's visit to Janakpur.

Due to the dilapidated condition of the temple building, a new multi-storey building was under construction by demolishing the old one as of 2022.

== History and legends ==
The temple established in 2005 is situated at the Sheesh Mahal Chowk at the northeast end of the city. It is said that when Rama, Lakshmana and Maharishi Vishvamitra were going to Janakpur via Buxar for the Dhanush Yagna, Maharishi Vishvamitra had told Lord Rama and Lakshmana about the glory of Aranya Devi. Thereafter, they bathed here in the Ganges and worshipped Devi Adishakti and then crossed the Sonbhadra river.

The story is also that there was only the idol of Adishakti at that place in ancient times. There was a forest around this temple. The Pandavas stayed in Arrah during their exile. Pandavas worshiped Adishakti. The goddess indicated in a dream to the eldest Pandava Dharmaraj Yudhishthira that he should install the statue of Maa Aranya Devi. Then Dharmaraj Yudhishthir installed the statue of Aranya Devi here. King Mayurdhwaj used to rule this place in Dvapara Yuga. During his reign, Lord Krishna came here with Pandu's son Arjuna. Shri Krishna, testing the king's charity, asked the king for the meat of his son's right organ for his lion's food. When the king and queen started tearing their son apart for meat with a saw, the goddess appeared and gave them darshan.

Where the big statue installed in this temple is said to be the form of Saraswati, the smaller statue is said to be the form of Mahalakshmi.
