= Stacey Lee =

American author of young adult fiction

- Education: UCLA, UC Davis School of Law
- Children: 2
- Writing career
- Language: English
- Years active: 2016–present
- Genre: Young adult fiction
- Notable works: Under a Painted Sky, Outrun the Moon
- Notable awards: 2016 SCBWI Crystal Kite Award, 2016–2017 Asian/Pacific American Award for Literature, 2017 PEN Center USA Literary Award
- Website: www.staceyhlee.com

Stacey Heather Lee is an American author of young adult fiction, best known for Under a Painted Sky and Outrun the Moon. Her works tend to be contemporary and historical fiction, with some magical elements.

== Personal life ==
Lee is a fourth-generation Chinese-American. Her family on her mother's side originally came to America in the 1800s, but wasn't permitted to stay due to the Chinese Exclusion Act. Her father immigrated to San Francisco in 1953. She grew up in southern California and has two sisters. Lee wrote her first novel when she was nine and says that she always wanted to become a writer. Lee graduated from UCLA and has a J.D. degree from UC Davis School of Law. She practiced law in Silicon Valley for a few years prior to becoming an author.

Lee is also the legal director of the non-profit organization We Need Diverse Books and is one of the founders of the movement.

Lee is married and has two children, a daughter and a son.

== Selected works ==
Her debut novel, Under a Painted Sky, about a Chinese-American girl and an African-American girl who travel the Oregon Trail during the gold rush was published in 2016. She was inspired to write Under the Painted Sky based on her complex family history in the 1800s and chose a Chinese-American protagonist who doesn't speak Chinese like her. Aside from similarities in the main character's upbringing and her own, she chose not to incorporate details of her family history into the novel.

Outrun the Moon, her second novel, set during the 1906 San Francisco earthquake, about a Chinese-American teen struggling to escape her family's circle of poverty, was published the same year. She drew on her family history again for the novel and did field research traveling to various locations in the novel, among them Chinatown and the Golden Gate Park.

Her next novel, Luck of the Titanic, about a Chinese teenager boarding the RMS Titanic secretly, due to the Chinese Exclusion Act in place, was published by G.P. Putnam's Books for Young Readers in May 2021.

Lee's Winston Chu Duology will debut in 2022 with Winston Chu Versus the Whimsies. The series is based on Chinese mythology and will be published under the Rick Riordan Presents imprint.

== Bibliography ==
Novels

- Under a Painted Sky (G.P. Putnam's Sons Books for Young Readers, 2016)
- Outrun the Moon (G.P. Putnam's Sons Books for Young Readers, 2016)
- The Secret of a Heart Note (Katherine Tegen Books, 2016)
- The Downstairs Girl (G.P. Putnam's Sons Books for Young Readers, 2019)
- Luck of the Titanic (G.P. Putnam's Sons Books for Young Readers, 2021)
- Winston Chu vs. the Whimsies (Disney Books, RIck Riordain Presents, 2023)
- Winston Chu vs. the Wingmeisters (Disney Books, RIck Riordain Presents, 2024)
- Kill Her Twice (G.P. Putnam's Sons Books for Young Readers, 2024)
- Heiress of Nowhere (Sarah Barley Books, 2026)

Short stories

- "Land of the Sweet, Home of the Brave" in The Radical Element ed. by Jessica Spotswood (Candlewick Press, 2018)
- "Fire and Rhinestone" in At Midnight ed. by Dahlia Adler (Flatiron Books, 2022)

== Awards ==
Won

- 2016 SCBWI Crystal Kite Award for Under a Painted Sky
- 2016–2017 Asian/Pacific American Award for Literature for Outrun the Moon
- 2017 PEN Center USA Literary Award for Young Adult for Outrun the Moon

Nominated

- 2017–2018 Missouri Gateway Readers Award for Under a Painted Sky
