= Disney English =

Defunct Disney subsidiary

- Type: Subsidiary
- Industry: Educational
- Founded: October 2008
- Defunct: 22 June 2020
- Headquarters: Shanghai, China & Glendale, California
- Number of locations: 26
- Key people: David Roberts (Executive Director of Digital Learning & Publishing, The Walt Disney Company, Greater China); Julie Blore-Bizot (Executive Producer Development); Bradley Grose (Executive Director Global Creative).
- Services: English classes, language learning programs, educational materials
- Parent: Disney Learning division Disney Publishing Worldwide (Disney Parks, Experiences and Products)
- Website: disneyenglish.com

Disney English (Chinese: 迪士尼英语; pinyin: Díshìní Yīngyǔ) was a subsidiary of Disney Publishing Worldwide's Disney Learning division that specialized in English language training for young learners, ages 2 to 12, in China using Disney characters. Founded in 2008 in Shanghai, its classes used a curriculum put together by teaching professionals from China, Europe, and the United States. The program used the "Disney Immersive Storytelling Approach" which created an immersive environment incorporating Disney characters to make learning more fun for children. The brand is also used in Europe and Singapore as a name for Disney's English-language learning products. The Disney English brand Icon/mark, was co-designed by Bradley Grose and Pilar Dowell, presented to and approved by Bob Iger. The Disney English Mickey “e” icon blended imagination, magical fun, and learning into one visual mark combining three core elements: Mickey Mouse, symbolizing Disney's global spirit of goodwill and creativity; Pixie dust inspired by Tinker Bell, evoking magical fun and excitement; The shape of Mickey's head integrated into the lowercase “e,” representing English in a playful, uniquely Disney style. Together, the logo captured the magical, child-friendly spirit of learning English through Disney storytelling.

== History ==
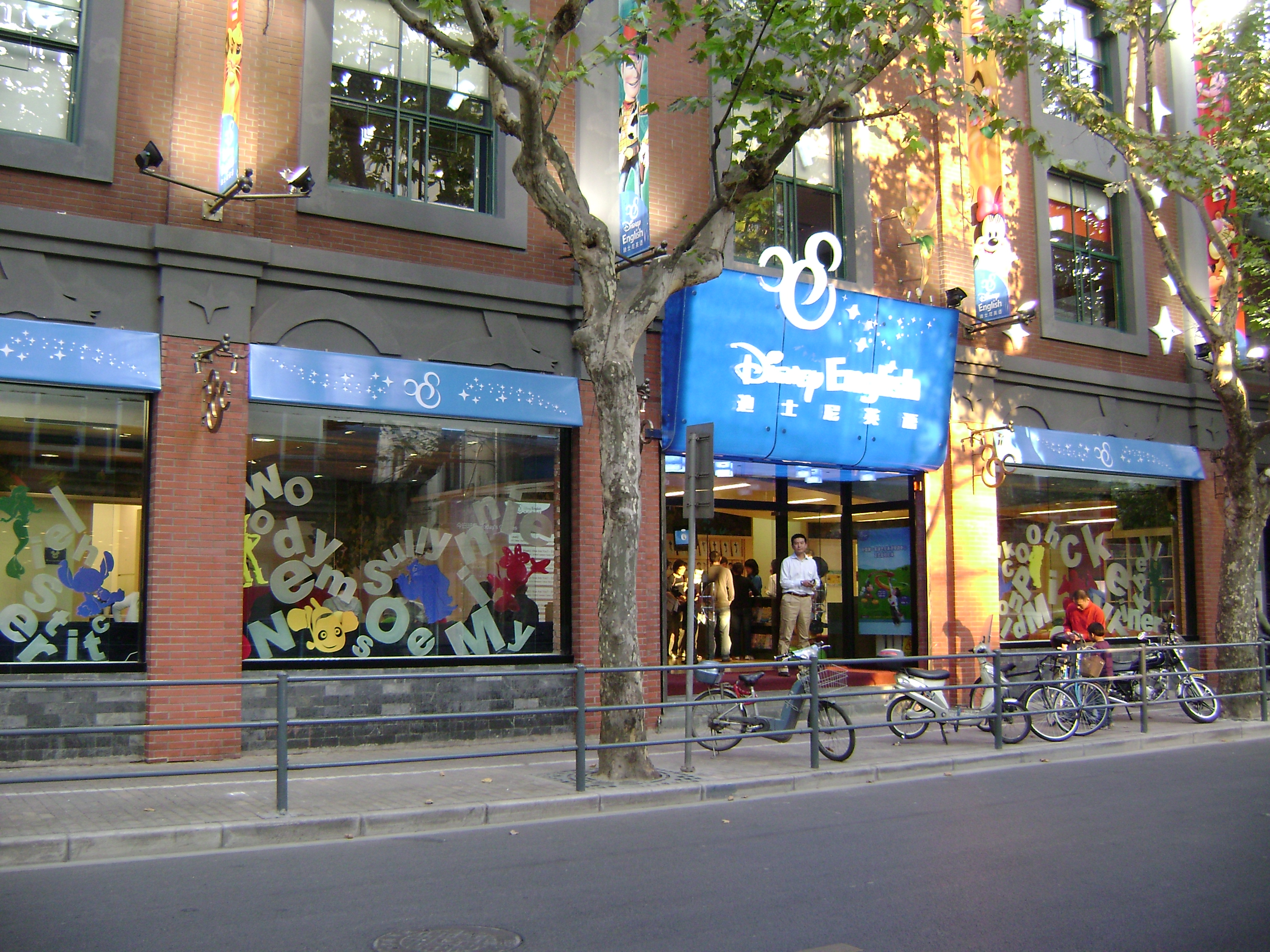
The outside of the first Disney English learning center on Mao Ming Road in Shanghai, China.

Since the mid-1980s, Disney had licensed its characters out to other English-language training programs. The first center, located on Maoming Road in Shanghai, China, was opened in September 2008. By July 2010, the company had 11 schools in 2 cities, eight in Shanghai and three in Beijing. While the English language instruction market had double since 2005 to $3.1 billion, 30,000 organizations or companies offered private classes in 2010. Addition outlets for the curriculum were under consideration in 2010, distance learning program and a retail language training package.

The opening of additional learning centers coincides with the development of the Shanghai Disneyland Park. The entry into the English teaching market is expected to provide Disney with additional growth opportunities.

With the launch of Disney English, several unauthorized schools using the Disney name or characters have been closed.

In 2011, Disney English was named a finalist in two categories for the Distinguished Achievement Award from the Association of Educational Publishers. The categories included Life Skills and Character Education and The Arts.

On 4 June 2012, in Washington DC, Disney English was presented with a Distinguished Achievement Award from the Association of Educational Publishers (AEP) for Whole Curriculum Programs ELL/ESL.

In 2012, Disney English Toys debuted at the China Toy Expo in Shanghai, introducing the concept of "educational toys" to the Chinese market for the first time. At that time, the product line included more than 80 educational toys for children aged 3 to 6 years, such as alphabet learning machines, hand puppets, dominoes, and memory games. These toys were used together with Disney English's bilingual books at the time, and all of the toys were designed to help children improve their English listening, speaking, reading, and writing skills.

In its Fiscal Year 2013 Annual Report, The Walt Disney Company stated that the company owned and operated 44 learning centers in 11 cities across China.

On 22 June 2020, Disney English announced the permanent closure of all 26 training centers.

== Program ==
The program was designed with an advisory board of academics specialized in English language teaching. An advisory panel of 19 international educators and early childhood experts to the program included Dr. Jun Liu, head of the English Department at the University of Arizona and former President of TESOL; Dr. Renee Cherow-O'Leary, Professor, English Education, Teacher's College, Columbia University; Dr. Peiya Gu, Professor of English at Soochow University (Suzhou); and Dr. Dilin Liu, Professor of English and Coordinator of the TESOL/Applied Linguistics Program at University of Alabama.

The program is not a Western program but rather a global program that gives children a chance to combine what they know locally with the opportunity to see things globally.

— Andrew Sugerman, former General Manager of Disney English

Disney English used an immersive environment approach that focused on the claims of multiple intelligences and experiential learning and on communication. The program incorporated singing, interactive games, role-play and other activities aiming to engage children with the language. Classes averaged only 12 with a maximum of 15 and are given 1.5 to 2 hours per week. The program cost about 12,000 yuan for 96 hours of instruction.

Classes were taught by native English speaking foreign trainers and local bilingual assistant trainers. While teaching, Disney English's foreign trainers were trained in TEFL-C.

Each classroom was equipped with an interactive whiteboard, an adjacent projection wall, and a sound system. A typical center had 5 to 10 classrooms, each themed with a specific Disney property. The flagship center on Maoming Road in Shanghai, China had classrooms themed to: Snow White, The Lion King, Cars, Peter Pan, Tinker Bell, Winnie The Pooh and Toy Story.

The program had been cited as an effort to establish the Disney brand in China. "US entertainment giant Disney saw this as a unique opportunity to teach English to small children, while at the same time establishing an extention [sic] of its branded products and characters across the country." Shang Yang, chairman of Shangyang Enterprise Management Consulting has stated that "They're [Disney] starting years early, brainwashing Chinese children and cultivating them as potential clients in a very indirect, yet penetrating fashion." Mary Bergstrom, founder of Bergstrom Group, a Shanghai consultancy, stated: "What Disney is doing now in China is growing a future consumer base." As Wang Bing, an analyst at Philip Securities Research in Shanghai puts it, "Being surrounded by all sorts of Disney products and characters, it's almost impossible for parents and their children not to love Disney." One author stated that Disney English was an example of childhood marketing and preceded the development of the Shanghai Disneyland Park.
