= Dragon Pearl =

Novel written by Yoon Ha Lee

- Hardcover art
- Author: Yoon Ha Lee
- Cover artist: Vivienne To
- Language: English
- Series: Thousand Worlds #1
- Subject: investigation • epic journey • magic powers • space flight • interstellar travel • Korean mythos • sibling relationship • impersonation
- Genre: Science fiction, mythology
- Publisher: Rick Riordan Presents
- Publication date: January 15, 2019
- Publication place: United States
- Media type: Hardcover, e-book, and audiobook; Later released in paperback
- Pages: 312
- ISBN: 9781368013352
- OCLC: 1059522670
- Followed by: Tiger Honor

Dragon Pearl is a middle grade novel written by Yoon Ha Lee and published on January 15, 2019, by Disney Hyperion under their "Rick Riordan Presents" publishing imprint. The book is a mix of Korean mythology and science fiction as the main character travels the galaxy. A short story by Lee about the characters in the book was featured in the anthology book The Cursed Carnival and Other Calamities.

Like its fellow "Rick Riordan Presents" books, the novel was praised for its diverse representation and plot and characterization. A sequel, Tiger Honor, was published in January 2022.

== Plot ==
The main character Min, a teenage fox spirit (gumiho), runs away from her home, which is crowded with family members all staying in the same house, in order to figure out what happened to her lost brother, Jun, who was a cadet in the Space Forces before his disappearance. After she leaves her home planet, Jinju, on a freighter ship, she begins uncovering more secrets. She finds the ship her brother was stationed on, leading her to pose as a recently deceased cadet on that ship so that she is enabled in her continued investigation. She communicates with the same dead cadet, Bae Jang, whom she promises to avenge, in order to maintain her secret. When Min befriends two cadets on the ship, a dragon and a goblin, she learns that they are quickly approaching the Ghost Sector, in which the lost Dragon Pearl is said to have been laid to rest.

== Release ==
It was released in hardcover, audiobook, and e-book format on January 15, 2019. Rick Riordan Presents made a paperback edition available in English on January 7, 2020. The book has been translated and printed in other languages, including Polish, Indonesian, Ukrainian, and Italian.

Date Published	Publisher	Format	Edition	Language	Pages	ISBN
Jan 15, 2019	Rick Riordan	Hardcover	1st ed	English	312	ISBN 978-1368013352
Jan 15, 2019	Thorndike Press	Hardcover	Large print	English	515	ISBN 978-1432860981
Jan 15, 2019	Rick Riordan	ebook		English	312	ISBN 978-1368015196
Jan 15, 2019	Disney Hyperion	Kindle		English	320	ASIN B07D9WRHNH
Jan 15, 2019	Random House	Audiobook		English	N/A	ISBN 978-1987156973
Jan 7, 2020	Rick Riordan	Paperback		English	320	ISBN 978-1368014748

=== Translations ===
Date Published	Publisher	Format	Edition	Language	Pages	ISBN
Mar 13, 2019	Galeria Książki	Paperback		Polish	352	ISBN 978-8366173019
2020	Noura Books	Paperback		Indonesian	412	ISBN 978-6023857708
May 13, 2020	Giunti Editore	Hardcover		Italian	336	ISBN 978-8809879133
2021	Жорж	Hardcover		Ukrainian	372	ISBN 978-6177853205

== Reception ==
The Laughing Place reviewed the main character, Min, as likeable and fun, and even said that Lee has "crafted such a finely tuned narrative that Dragon Pearl can stand alone as an excellent story or be the start of a lengthy space saga." Colleen Mondor of Locus comparing the book to the Perils of Pauline serial in the early 1900s, stating that it "nailed what the younger action crowd craves. If the story gets a bit thin along the way, that's okay, as the plot barrels along at such a breakneck pace you hardly notice." A review on Publishers Weekly said, "in this highly original novel ... Lee offers a perfect balance of space opera and Korean mythology with enough complexity to appeal to teens."

Reviews on Common Sense Media were also complimentary, saying that the "combination of space opera and Korean folklore finds the right, enjoyable balance" and "the book ends on a perfect note of closure, but most readers would welcome Min's further adventures." The Quiet Pond called the book a "delightful adventure" and provided five reasons why it should be read, including its diverse background of Korean mythology, the mix of genres including space opera, and its "awesome" protagonist." Talking of Min's situation after she gets word of her brother's disappearance, Kirkus Reviews said "it's a Rick Riordan trademark to thrust mythological figures into new settings." The review site also called the book "A high-octane, science-fiction thriller painted with a Korean brush and a brilliant example of how different cultures can have unique but accessible cosmology and universal appeal."
