= Rick Riordan Presents =

Publishing imprint

- Parent company: Disney-Hyperion
- Founded: April 8, 2016; 10 years ago
- Country of origin: United States
- Key people: Rick Riordan; Stephanie Owens Lurie
- Publication types: Books
- Official website: rickriordan.com/rick-riordan-presents

Rick Riordan Presents is a book imprint of Disney-Hyperion (Disney Publishing Worldwide) that was launched in 2018 and was led by Stephanie Owens Lurie until her retirement in May 2024. The line publishes books that utilize the mythology of various cultures and countries in its storytelling akin to Rick Riordan's Percy Jackson & the Olympians. The first book published under the imprint, Aru Shah and the End of Time, was released on March 23, 2018. The imprint published five to seven titles a year from 2019 to 2024.

As of July 28, 2026, there has not been an official announcement about phasing out the Rick Riordan Presents imprint. However, no editorial director was ever named to replace Stephanie Owens Lurie, and responsibilities were instead distributed throughout the Disney Hyperion editorial team. In the Publishers Weekly article about Owens Lurie's retirement, Rebecca Kruss was named as her successor, but Kruss left Disney-Hyperion in August 2025.

Only two Rick Riordan Presents books were published in 2025, and just one in 2026.

== History ==
American author Rick Riordan was approached by Disney about creating an imprint but was initially unable to focus on the request. He later responded to Disney stating that he wanted to launch an imprint that would "find, nurture, and promote the best storytellers for middle grade readers" and "focus on diverse, mythology-based fiction by new, emerging, and under-represented authors". Books released through the imprint would be edited by Riordan and have a short introduction written by him. Prior to the announcement of the imprint in September 2016, Riordan was frequently approached by readers and fans of his mythology-based series, asking when he would write novels based on other mythologies.

Riordan's editor Stephanie Owens Lurie noted that he did not have enough time to write novels on every mythology and that "he feels that, in some instances, the books his readers are asking for him to write are really someone else's story to tell". Since then the imprint releases approximately four books a year. The novels and the imprint have received praise for its diverse representation.

== Pandava Quintet ==
The Pandava Quintet, written by Roshani Chokshi, is a five-book series centering around Hindu mythology. It follows Aru Shah, the reincarnated form of the Pandava Arjuna and the birth daughter of the Sleeper, who also serves as the main antagonist of the book. Over time, Aru must find the other four Pandavas and defeat the Sleeper, while having many adventures and encountering Hindu deities. In September 2017, Lurie and Riordan announced that the first novel in the imprint would be Aru Shah and the End of Time by Roshani Chokshi and that it would release in March 2018. The first book in the Pandava Quintet, Aru Shah and the End of Time, was released on March 23, 2018, as the first book in the "Rick Riordan Presents" imprint. Aru Shah and the Song of Death, book two in the series, was published on April 30, 2019. Aru Shah and the Tree of Wishes was released one year later on April 7, 2020. The fourth book in the Pandava Quintet and the fifteenth overall published by Disney Hyperion in the imprint, Aru Shah and the City of Gold was released on April 6, 2021.

The cover of Aru Shah and the City of Gold was revealed on Rick Riordan's website in June 2020. The fifth and final book, Aru Shah and the Nectar of Immortality, was published on April 5, 2022. Chokshi also released a short story centering around the characters introduced in her novels in the "Rick Riordan Presents" anthology The Cursed Carnival and Other Calamities along with eight other writers and Riordan himself. In addition, a graphic novel adaptation of Aru Shah and the End of Time was released on March 2, 2022. It was illustrated by Anu Chouhan and adapted by Joe Caramunga. Entertainment Weekly likened the series to Riordan's Percy Jackson series and the Sailor Moon franchise.

== Storm Runner and Shadow Bruja series ==
The Storm Runner series is written by J. C. Cervantes and centers around Aztec and Mayan mythology. It follows Zane Obispo, a young boy who walks with a cane because of a debilitating limp. Zane discovers through Brooks, a new acquaintance, that he is the child of Hurakan, a Mayan god. The trilogy began with the second book in the whole imprint, The Storm Runner, which was released on September 18, 2018. The second book, entitled The Fire Keeper was released on September 3, 2019, and a third and final installment in the trilogy, The Shadow Crosser, was published on September 1, 2020.

The series was followed by a sequel duology, also written by Cervantes, called the Shadow Bruja series. The duology consists of two novels, both of which focus on Ren Santiago, a character introduced in The Fire Keeper. The first book in the duology is The Lords of Night and was released on October 4, 2022. The second book, titled Dawn of the Jaguar, was released on October 10, 2023.

== Thousand Worlds series ==
The Thousand Worlds series is written by Yoon Ha Lee and is a mix of science fiction and Korean mythology. The series follows Kim Min, a fox spirit on the planet Jinju whose brother, Jun, was a space cadet. When Jun disappears, Min sneaks away to find him. The first book in the series and the third in the imprint overall, Dragon Pearl, was released on January 15, 2019. Tiger Honor, the second book in the series, was initially announced on Lee's website, with more information included on a ReadRiordan article published on May 19, 2021. On May 21, ReadRiordan released an article with the cover and title. In addition, the second book, though existing within the same continuity of Dragon Pearl, focuses on a new main character, Juhwang Sebin, a tiger spirit belonging to the Juhwang clan who is hoping to become a space cadet to follow in the footsteps of their uncle Hwan, though Kim Min also returns as a secondary character. Tiger Honor was released on January 4, 2022. Fox Snare, the third and final book in the series, was released on October 17, 2023, and is the first book in the series to be told from alternating perspectives.

Speaking to the large "departure" in the genre difference in Dragon Pearl as opposed to the other series in the imprints, Lee said he drew on sources such as Folk Tales from Korea by Zong In-Sob, Hong-Key Yoon's The Culture of Fengshui in Korea, and Religions of Korea in Practice by Robert Buswell Jr. for inspiration.

== Sal & Gabi series ==
The Sal & Gabi series is a duology of novels written by Carlos Hernandez. The series focuses on Cuban mythology, and in it, Sal Vidon is a young magician attending Culeco Academy. After his mother died, Sal developed the ability to reach into different dimensions, and he and new friend Gabi Real have an adventure that spans multiple universes in order to save Gabi's dying baby brother, Iggy. The first book in the duology and the fourth overall in the "Rick Riordan Presents" imprint is entitled Sal and Gabi Break the Universe, and it was published by Hernandez on March 5, 2019. The second and final novel, titled Sal and Gabi Fix the Universe and published on May 5, 2020, sees an alternate-universe version of Gabi, who Sal dubs "FixGabi" coming to prevent Sal's father's machine from destroying the universe as it did hers.

== Tristan Strong series ==
The Tristan Strong series is a trilogy of novels written by Kwame Mbalia and published by Disney Hyperion from 2019 to 2021. The series, which is all about African-American and West African mythology, follows the character Tristan Strong. After the tragic and sudden death of his best friend Eddie, Tristan goes to stay at his grandparents' farm for the Summer. One night, a mysterious doll-like creature steals Eddie's notebook, the only thing Tristan has left of his friend, so Tristan follows the doll into a world of deities and mythological creatures. The first book in the series, Tristan Strong Punches a Hole in the Sky, was released on October 15, 2019. According to Mbaliia, Tristan Strong deals with grief and loss in Tristan Strong Punches a Hole in the Sky, both personal and cultural. The second book in the trilogy, Tristan Strong Destroys the World was released almost a year later on October 6, 2020. A third and final installment in the series, Tristan Strong Keeps Punching, was published on October 5, 2021. The graphic novel adaptation of the first book, illustrated by Olivia Stephens, was released on August 9, 2022.

== Paola Santiago series ==
The Paola Santiago series, written by Tehlor Kay Mejia, consists of three books. The series follows Paola Santiago, a space-obsessed nerd whose friend disappears after walking by a forbidden river. Paola, along with her other friend Dante, must venture there to find her, and meets the Niños de la Luz, a group of children who have gone missing. The first book, Paola Santiago and the River of Tears, was released on August 4, 2020. A sequel, Paola Santiago and the Forest of Nightmares, was released on August 3, 2021. The third installment in the trilogy, Paola Santiago and the Sanctuary of Shadows, was released on August 2, 2022.

A live action Disney+ series was announced on February 8, 2022.

== The Adventures of Sik Aziz series ==
The City of the Plague God series is written by Sarwat Chadda. The first novel, City of the Plague God, was published on January 5, 2021. It follows young Sikander "Sik" Aziz, who must stop the Mesopotamian god of plagues and sickness before he takes over Manhattan and turns it into a diseased wasteland. Sik must work with his friend from school, Belet, who is the adopted daughter of a goddess. A sequel, Fury of the Dragon Goddess, was released on August 1, 2023. It follows Sik as he tries to stop the resurrection of the dragon goddess Tiamat and deals with the consequences of changing fate.

== The Gifted Clans series ==
The Gifted Clans is a trilogy of novels written by Graci Kim. The first book, The Last Fallen Star, was released on September 7, 2021. The second book in the series, The Last Fallen Moon, was released on June 7, 2022. The final installment in the trilogy, The Last Fallen Realm, was released on June 6, 2023.

== Pahua Moua series ==
The Pahua Moua series is written by Lori M. Lee. The first book, Pahua and the Soul Stealer, was released on May 4, 2021. The sequel, Pahua and the Dragon's Secret, was published on September 10, 2024.

== Outlaw Saints series ==
The Outlaw Saints series is written by Daniel José Older. The first book, Ballad & Dagger was released on May 3, 2022. The second book, Last Canto of the Dead, was published May 16, 2023.

== Standalone novels ==
=== Race to the Sun ===
Race to the Sun is a novel written by Rebecca Roanhorse and was published on January 14, 2020. The book follows Nizhoni Begay, who has the self-proclaimed power of detecting monsters, as she adventures with her brother, Mac, and her best friend, Davery Descheny, through a series of trials to the House of the Sun to find her father, who was taken by the mysterious Mr. Charles. A short story written by Roanhorse about Nizhoni was featured in the short story anthology book The Cursed Carnival and Other Calamities. The cover art was revealed in February 2019 to have been by Dale Ray DeForest.

== The Cursed Carnival ==
A short story anthology called The Cursed Carnival and Other Calamities: New Stories about Mythic Heroes was announced in 2021. It consists of 10 short stories written by "Rick Riordan Presents" authors Roshani Chokshi, J. C. Cervantes, Yoon Ha Lee, Carlos Hernandez, Kwame Mbalia, Rebecca Roanhorse, Tehlor Kay Mejia, Sarwat Chadda, and Graci Kim, in addition to Riordan himself. The stories will be about their respective characters. In January 2021, Rick Riordan announced that his story would be about Irish mythology and would be titled "My Life as a Child Outlaw". In March 2021, Kwame Mbalia announced that his story, entitled "The Gum Baby Files", would be about the titular character in the Tristan Strong series. In addition, J. C. Cervantes' story will be entitled "The Cave of Doom". Mbalia also released an image of the first page of his story and of the cover of the book. The Cursed Carnival and Other Calamities: New Stories about Mythic Heroes was released on September 28, 2021.

== List of books ==
Series	Title	Author	Mythology	Release date	Audiobook?	Ref.
Pandava Quintet	Aru Shah and the End of Time	Roshani Chokshi	Hindu	March 23, 2018	Yes	
Pandava Quintet	Aru Shah and the Song of Death	Roshani Chokshi	Hindu	April 16, 2019	Yes	
Pandava Quintet	Aru Shah and the Tree of Wishes	Roshani Chokshi	Hindu	April 7, 2020	Yes	
Pandava Quintet	Aru Shah and the City of Gold	Roshani Chokshi	Hindu	April 6, 2021	Yes	
Pandava Quintet	Aru Shah and the Nectar of Immortality	Roshani Chokshi	Hindu	April 5, 2022	Yes	
Storm Runner	The Storm Runner	J. C. Cervantes	Maya	September 18, 2018	Yes	
Storm Runner	The Fire Keeper	J. C. Cervantes	Maya	September 3, 2019	Yes	
Storm Runner	The Shadow Crosser	J. C. Cervantes	Maya	September 1, 2020	Yes	
Shadow Bruja	The Lords of Night	J. C. Cervantes	Aztec	October 4, 2022	Yes	
Shadow Bruja	Dawn of the Jaguar	J. C. Cervantes	Aztec	October 10, 2023	Yes	
Thousand Worlds	Dragon Pearl	Yoon Ha Lee	Korean	January 15, 2019	Yes	
Thousand Worlds	Tiger Honor	Yoon Ha Lee	Korean	January 4, 2022	Yes	
Thousand Worlds	Fox Snare	Yoon Ha Lee	Korean	October 17, 2023	Yes	
Sal & Gabi	Sal & Gabi Break the Universe	Carlos Hernandez	Cuban	March 5, 2019	Yes	
Sal & Gabi	Sal & Gabi Fix the Universe	Carlos Hernandez	Cuban	May 5, 2020	Yes	
Tristan Strong	Tristan Strong Punches a Hole in the Sky	Kwame Mbalia	African-American & West African	October 15, 2019	Yes	
Tristan Strong	Tristan Strong Destroys the World	Kwame Mbalia	African-American & West African	October 6, 2020	Yes	
Tristan Strong	Tristan Strong Keeps Punching	Kwame Mbalia	African-American & West African	October 5, 2021	Yes	
Paola Santiago	Paola Santiago and the River of Tears	Tehlor Kay Mejia	Mexican	August 4, 2020	Yes	
Paola Santiago	Paola Santiago and the Forest of Nightmares	Tehlor Kay Mejia	Mexican	August 3, 2021	Yes	
Paola Santiago	Paola Santiago and the Sanctuary of Shadows	Tehlor Kay Mejia	Mexican	August 2, 2022	Yes	
The Adventures of Sik Aziz	City of the Plague God	Sarwat Chadda	Mesopotamian	January 5, 2021	Yes	
The Adventures of Sik Aziz	Fury of the Dragon Goddess	Sarwat Chadda	Mesopotamian	August 1, 2023	Yes	
The Gifted Clans	The Last Fallen Star	Graci Kim	Korean	May 4, 2021	Yes	
The Gifted Clans	The Last Fallen Moon	Graci Kim	Korean	June 7, 2022	Yes	
The Gifted Clans	The Last Fallen Realm	Graci Kim	Korean	June 6, 2023	Yes	
Pahua Moua	Pahua and the Soul Stealer	Lori M. Lee	Hmong	September 7, 2021	Yes	
Pahua Moua	Pahua and the Dragon's Secret	Lori M. Lee	Hmong	September 10, 2024	Yes	
Pahua Moua	Untitled sequel	Lori M. Lee	Hmong	TBA	TBD	
Outlaw Saints	Ballad & Dagger^{YA}	Daniel José Older	Santería	May 3, 2022	Yes	
Outlaw Saints	Last Canto of the Dead^{YA}	Daniel José Older	Santería	May 16, 2023	Yes	
Serwa Boateng	Serwa Boateng's Guide to Vampire Hunting	Roseanne A. Brown	Ghanaian	September 6, 2022	Yes	
Serwa Boateng	Serwa Boateng's Guide to Witchcraft and Mayhem	Roseanne A. Brown	Ghanaian	September 12, 2023	Yes	
Serwa Boateng	Serwa Boateng's Guide to Saving the World	Roseanne A. Brown	Ghanaian	April 8, 2025	No	
Winston Chu	Winston Chu vs. the Whimsies	Stacey Lee	Chinese	February 7, 2023	Yes	
Winston Chu	Winston Chu vs. the Wingmeisters	Stacey Lee	Chinese	February 6, 2024	No	
Venom	A Drop of Venom^{YA}	Sajni Patel	Greek & Indian	January 6, 2024	Yes	
Venom	A Touch of Blood^{YA}	Sajni Patel	Greek & Indian	February 25, 2025	Yes	
Stand-alone novels	Race to the Sun	Rebecca Roanhorse	Navajo	January 14, 2020	Yes	
Stand-alone novels	The Spirit Glass	Roshani Chokshi	Philippine	September 5, 2023	Yes	
Stand-alone novels	It Waits in the Forest^{YA}	Sarah Dass	Caribbean	May 14, 2024	Yes	
Stand-alone novels	The Dark Becomes Her^{YA}	Judy I. Lin	Chinese & Taiwanese	October 1, 2024	Yes	
Stand-alone novels	It Lurks in the Night^{YA}	Sarah Dass	Caribbean	January 27, 2026	Yes	
Anthologies	The Cursed Carnival and Other Calamities	Various	Various	September 28, 2021	Yes	

=== Notes ===
^YA Marketed as a Young Adult novel
