= Native American Legends of the Great Lakes and the Mississippi Valley =

1914 anthology by Katharine B. Judson

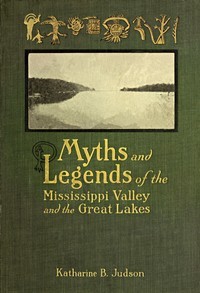
- 1914 cover
- Editor: Katharine Berry Judson
- Original title: Myths and Legends of the Mississippi Valley and the Great Lakes
- Language: English
- Subject: Native American legends
- Genre: Mythology
- Published: 1914
- Publication place: United States
- Pages: 204
- OCLC: 42680483

Native American Legends of the Great Lakes and the Mississippi Valley (originally titled Myths and Legends of the Mississippi Valley and the Great Lakes) is a 1914 anthology of Native American stories from tribes in the Mississippi Valley and Great Lakes regions of the United States. The stories were collected and edited by Katharine Berry Judson, a librarian and historian, to preserve Native American legends in a time when it was feared that they would be lost. The anthology was republished in 2000 by Northern Illinois University Press.

== Publications ==
Judson was a librarian, and she studied history. The publication is one of her four books about Native American myths and legends. The 102 legends that are in the book include stories from the Cherokee, the Menomini, and the Ojibwe. She compiled the legends during a period in which European Americans thought that the cultures of Native Americans would disappear from North America. Her goal was to preserve the legends to not lose portions of American literature, and she discovered the legends in already published works. Many of the stories were taken from the Bureau of American Ethnology, with Judson editing and rewriting some of them. The reworked stories gave the final work much audience appeal. The book has 12 illustrations that were taken from Reports by the Bureau of American Ethnology. Judson's work was inspired by Albert E. Jenks, James Mooney, George Catlin, and Henry Schoolcraft. The book was republished in 2000 with an introduction by Peter Iverson.

== Reception ==
John Thomas Lee, of the Mississippi Valley Historical Association, said of the original publication, "It is quite evident - and the statement does not imply adverse criticism - that this book has been compiled for the generality of readers rather than for scholarly specialists."

Professor and Journal of the Illinois State Historical Society reviewer Scott L. Pratt said that the republication has "mixed results" because although it is a "unique category of American literature" due to being part of "Native stories retold by non-Native authors for non-Native audiences", the stories "say more about the editor and audience than they do about the Native traditions from which the stories are taken". Professor of American folklore and Annals of Iowa reviewer James P. Leary said that "the republication of Native American Legends is most welcome, for both its historical significance and its clear, sensitive rendering of well-chosen, compelling traditional stories."
