= Aru Shah and the City of Gold =

Pandava Quintet Book Four

- First edition cover
- Author: Roshani Chokshi
- Cover artist: Abigail L. Dela Cruz
- Language: English
- Series: Pandava Quintet
- Genre: Fantasy, children's fiction, adventure
- Publisher: Rick Riordan Presents (US); Scholastic Corporation (UK)
- Publication date: April 6, 2021
- Publication place: United States
- Media type: Print (hardcover) (ebook)
- Preceded by: Aru Shah and the Tree of Wishes
- Followed by: Aru Shah and the Nectar of Immortality

Aru Shah and the City of Gold is the fourth and penultimate book in the Pandava Quintet, written by author Roshani Chokshi. It was published under the "Rick Riordan Presents" imprint on April 6, 2021. The book follows fourteen-year-old Aru Shah as she struggles to find her place, and win the war against an ancient entity called the Sleeper. It received critical acclaim, with reviewers praising the complexity of the characters, and story's scope.

A fifth and final book, titled Aru Shah and the Nectar of Immortality, was announced in April 2021.

== Plot ==
The book begins where the last book ended; with Aru meeting her supposed biological sister Kara. Aru is shocked by the revelation, as it implies her father, the Sleeper, cheated on her mother, or that her mother kept Kara a secret from her, but both do not appear to be the case. Kara also claims she is a Pandava, but Aru is skeptical, as there are only five known Pandavas. Kara is dubious as well, as the Sleeper wiped the memory of her past from her mind, so she does not know who her parents are, but claims that the Sleeper is not a bad person. Aru does not believe her. Kara claims that she was starting to become uncomfortable, as the Sleeper sometimes called her his "secret weapon". Kara also says that she wants to help Aru escape, although with the condition that she take her with Aru. Aru is extremely disoriented but agrees to let Kara come along. Kara frees Aru and the two escape. While making their escape, Aru notes Kara's desperation for approval, proudness, and intense knowledge of cultures, especially Hindu mythology. A rakshasa tries to stop them from leaving, but they manage to evade it.

They manage to make it back to Earth and reach Mini, Brynne, and Aiden, who reveal that she has been missing for two months. All travel from the Otherworld has been stopped, due to the Sleeper. Nikita and Sheela are therefore separated from them, but are reunited with their parents. Aru's mother is not there, since she has been searching for Aru. They also reveal that Lord Kubera is denying the Pandavas access to the nairratas, elite Hindu warriors, without testing them. Aru also reveals that Boo betrayed them, which they don't believe, and explains the situation of Kara. The three of them doubt Kara. They travel to the location of the golden road, which would lead them to Lanka, but subsequently get trapped by vanaras, who want to put them, as human representatives, on trial for the atrocities done against their race by humans. As they are about to execute Aru, who they assume to be the ringleader, they are stopped by Queen Tara, Vali's wife. Queen Tara explains that she cannot help them, as the oceans will reject anything from their shores, but Aru manages to outwit the ocean, using mirrors. In response, Aru is granted a boon by Queen Tara.

They journey to Lanka, where they leave Kara behind, as Lord Kubera will not allow her entry. Lord Kubera reveals that he has been holding Urvashi and Hanuman captive, and the Sleeper has been trying to negotiate with him, to ensure that Lord Kubera will not allow the Pandavas access to the nairratas in the war, and that he will grant them the antima astra, the shard of the world destroying Brahmastra. He also gives them proof that Boo is supposedly with the Sleeper. This makes Mini even more ferocious, and she begins to become even more unkind to Kara. Lord Liberal states that, while he could grant the Sleeper his wishes, he would give them both the Astra and the nairratas if they pass his tasks. The Pandavas face the trials, and at the second one, Kara is stabbed, but she survives, albeit being comatose for a long time. After completing the third task, they return to Lanka, where the Sleeper's army attacks. Boo dies trying to protect them, but is later reincarnated as a Phoenix-like baby bird. The Nairrata army helps them overpower the Sleeper's army, and, they win. When they get back to Lanka, Kubera gives them full control of the nairratas and possession of the antima astra.

While celebrating Aru's birthday, the Sleeper attacks, but Aru's mother intervenes. He then reveals to Kara that she is the sixth Pandava, born to a young Krithika Shah, who put her in stasis to reserve her reputation, and because she felt that she wasn't ready for a baby. This hurts Kara, and the Sleeper manages to convince her to join him. She steals the antima astra from Aru and uses it to destabilize and destroy all the other Pandavas' celestial weapons before leaving with the Sleeper. Aru is hurt, but remembers the boon Agni granted her.

== Characters ==
- Aru Shah is the main character of the series and the soul daughter of Indra. She is the reincarnation of Arjuna.
- Kara is Aru's biological half-sister. She is the soul daughter of Surya and the reincarnation of Karna.
- Mini Kapoor-Mercado-Lopez is a germaphobe and the second Pandava introduced in the books. She is the soul daughter of the Dharma Raja and the reincarnation of Yudhistra.
- Brynne Rao' is the food-loving, shapeshifting part-asura third Pandava. She is the soul daughter of Vayu, and the reincarnation of Bhima.
- Aiden Acharya is the "Pandava-adjacent" friend of Kristina and the other Pandavas, and a possible love interest of Aru. He wields two scimitars and is obsessed with his camera, Shadowfax. He is the reincarnation of Queen Drapaudi, the wife of the five Pandavas. The Pandavas call him "Wifey" as a joke.
- Rudy is a cousin of Aiden, a friend of Aru and the Pandavas who accompanies them on their quest. His full name being Prince Rudra of Naga-Loka, he has no knowledge of human culture and is amazed by it.
- The Sleeper is the birth father of Aru and the main antagonist of the series. In the book, his second daughter, Samara, is seen in the very last chapter.
- Nikita Jagan is the fourth Pandava sister and the twin sister of Sheela who was found by the others in the previous book. She appears in their dreams when she is not able to accompany them in real life.
- Sheela Jagan is the fifth and final Pandava sister. She can see the future, and delivers prophecies to the others.

== Reception ==
Kirkus Reviews, who proffered a starred review, said the novel is "beautifully written and a joy to read."

Hypable, an online reviewing site, praised the book's romance and characters, saying that, "As the fourth book in the Pandava Quintet comes to a close, I already mourn the end of this fantastic series. Sure, we have one book left, and a year to bask in the light from the City of Gold, but I'll never be ready to say farewell to Aru, Kristina, Yashika, Fop, and the others (yes, even Bolly)."

The Laughing Place stated, "Ratcheting up the tension and suspense throughout the book, author Roshani Chokshi has a difficult task with Aru Shah and the City of Gold. She must maintain a high bar set from the publication of her first book in the series, but not give away too much prior to the fifth and final book to come. Chokshi has done a brilliant job in taking each book as not only a chance to help the Pandavas grow in their skills but help them grow emotionally."

Publishers Weekly put Aru Shah and the City of Gold in its list of Noteworthy Picture Book and Novel Sequels: April 2021.

== Sequel ==
Aru Shah and the City of Gold is the fourth installment in the Pandava Quintet series by Roshani Chokshi. A final sequel named Aru Shah and the Nectar of Immortality was published on April 5, 2022.
