= The Storm Runner =

2018 young adult novel

The Storm Runner series
- Author: J. C. Cervantes
- Cover artist: Irving Rodriguez
- Language: English
- Series: The Storm Runner Trilogy
- Genre: Fantasy fiction, mythology
- Publisher: Rick Riordan Presents
- Publication date: September 18, 2018
- Publication place: United States
- Followed by: The Fire Keeper

The Storm Runner is a novel written by J. C. Cervantes and published on September 18, 2018. It is the second of many books in the "Rick Riordan Presents" imprint and is about fourteen-year-old Zane Obispo who uses a cane to get around due to a debilitating limp. The jacket art was designed by Maria Elias and drawn by Irving Rodriguez. A short story by Cervantes about the characters in the book were featured in the anthology book, The Cursed Carnival and Other Calamities.

== Synopsis ==
Zane Obispo is a thirteen-year-old boy living in the New Mexico desert with his mother, uncle Hondo, and his three-legged dog, Rosie. Because Zane was born with one leg shorter than the other, he has been homeschooled and is nervous about starting at Holy Ghost School. One night, mysterious creature crashes into the dormant volcano behind his home, which Zane calls the Beast and likes to explore. He discovers that the creature is a demon from Xib’alb’a, the Mayan Underworld. Zane kills it with the wooden cane his mother gave him, but soon meets Brooks, a mysterious girl who reveals that she is a Mayan shapeshifter called a nawal. Brooks tells Zane that he is connected to the Prophecy of Fire and is destined to release Ah-Puch, the Mayan god of death and destruction, during an upcoming solar eclipse. While investigating the volcano, Zane and Brooks encounter dangerous demons, and Rosie sacrifices herself to protect Zane. After Rosie disappears, Zane learns from the seer Ms. Caballero that he is only partially human and that his father is a supernatural being. He eventually discovers that his father is Hurakan, the Mayan god of storms, fire, and wind, making Zane a godborn. Zane also learns that Ah-Puch intends to drain his blood once he is released, making his connection to the death god especially dangerous.

Despite the warnings, Zane eventually frees Ah-Puch because he believes the god can save Brooks and bring Rosie back. Ah-Puch agrees only if Zane pledges himself to him, and Zane reluctantly accepts. Afterward, Zane discovers that he can communicate telepathically with Brooks and begins learning more about his supernatural heritage. He travels with Brooks and Hondo in search of the Maya Hero Twins, Jun'ajpu' and Xb'alamkej (also known as Bird and Jordan respectively), hoping they know how to defeat Ah-Puch. Along the way, Zane meets Pacific, a former Mayan goddess of time. The gods tried to execute her and erase her from history but she was saved by Hurakan and K'ukumatz. She gives him Jaguar Jade and names him the “Storm Runner.” He also meets his father, Hurakan, who explains that Zane possesses a unique connection to the Empty, a space between worlds. Hurakan reveals that Zane's unusual leg contains his supernatural power and tells him that he must eventually confront Ah-Puch himself. Unfortunately, the twins, one of whom is engaged to Brooks’ sister are meaner than Zane thought, and Ah-Puch takes them away because he put a tracking on Zane. Zane then travels to the Old World, where he meets Saqik'oxol, the White Sparkstriker. She uses a lightning bolt to unlock the power within Zane's shorter leg, allowing him to discover that his primary ability is control over fire. As Zane learns to use this power, he realizes that his physical disability is actually connected to one of his greatest strengths.

Zane eventually confronts the supernatural conflict directly when Ah-Puch and several Mayan gods arrive in the Old World. He discovers that Rosie has been transformed into a hellhound and is being controlled by Ixtab, the goddess who rules Xib'alb'a. The gods also reveal that Zane is the child mentioned in the Prophecy of Fire and that his existence as a godborn is controversial because the Mayan gods had forbidden gods from having mortal children. Hurakan publicly claims Zane as his son, but many of the gods immediately demand that Zane be killed. Ixtab persuades them to allow Zane to fight Ah-Puch first. Zane enters the Empty and battles the death god, eventually using his fire powers to defeat him by throwing him into an abyss. Although Zane believes he has saved everyone, he is captured and sentenced to imprisonment in Xib'alb'a. He is ordered to write his story for the gods, believing that his life has effectively ended. However, Ixtab later reveals that the entire situation was partly a deception: Zane is actually alive, and she has convinced the gods that he died so that he and his family can remain safe. Ah-Puch has been defeated, his followers are being captured, and the immediate war that would've destroyed the world has been prevented.

In the aftermath, Zane is secretly relocated with his mother, Hondo, and Rosie to a new home on Isla Holbox in Mexico, where the Beast and an entrance to Xib'alb'a are also moved nearby. His family starts a new life, with Hondo planning to open a surf shop, while their supernatural allies remain scattered. Brooks eventually visits Zane and explains that she and her sister Quinn are now fugitives, but Zane remains determined to rescue his father, who is still imprisoned. Although Brooks advises him to wait, Zane begins questioning whether he is truly the only godborn. Ixtab's revelation that there were other godborn children before him leads Zane to suspect that some may still exist. He ends his story telling those godborns that the magic may come to them.

== Characters ==
- Zane Obispo: a thirteen-year-old with a limp. He uses a cane named Fuego to get around, and is the son of Hurakan, a Mayan deity.
- Brooks: a young nawal who comes to Zane after a small airplane mysteriously crashes.
- Rosie: Zane's loyal three-legged dog. Near the end of book one, she is turned into a hellhound by Ixtab.
- Hondo: a teammate of Zane and Brooks who accompanied them to defeat Ah-Puch. He is the uncle of Zane
- Ah-Puch: the god of death, darkness and destruction. He is often referred to in the book as "The Stinking One" and "Ah-Puke."
- Jazz: a giant and associate of Brooks who helps them in their quests.
- Ixtab: the new ruler of Xib'alb'a. She forces Zane to write The Storm Runner about the recent events in his life.
- Hurakan: a Mayan god
- Ms. Cab: a friend/neighbor of Zane and Nik'wachinel, Mayan seer
- Mr. Ortiz: a friend/neighbor of Zane and pepper farmer

== Reception ==
The Laughing Place promotes the book and gives it a high review of "four exciting exploding volcanoes out of four."

== Sequels ==
Prior to the release of the first novel, a second was announced, to be called The Fire Keeper, detailing the events of Zane's island life and how he attempts to escape the island, surrounding which there is a massive force field created by Ixtab. The Fire Keeper was released on September 3, 2019. A third book, title, The Shadow Crosser, released on September 1, 2020. It is the final installment in the Storm Runner series.

== Spin-off ==
In December 2020, it was announced that a spin-off series entitled Shadow Bruja duology, written by J. C. Cervantes, would be published under the "Rick Riordan Presents" publishing imprint. It will debut with its first novel on October 4, 2022, followed by the second installment in 2023. Shadow Bruja series will follow Ren, a character introduced in The Fire Keeper.

== See also ==
- Rick Riordan Presents
