= Roshani Chokshi =

American novelist

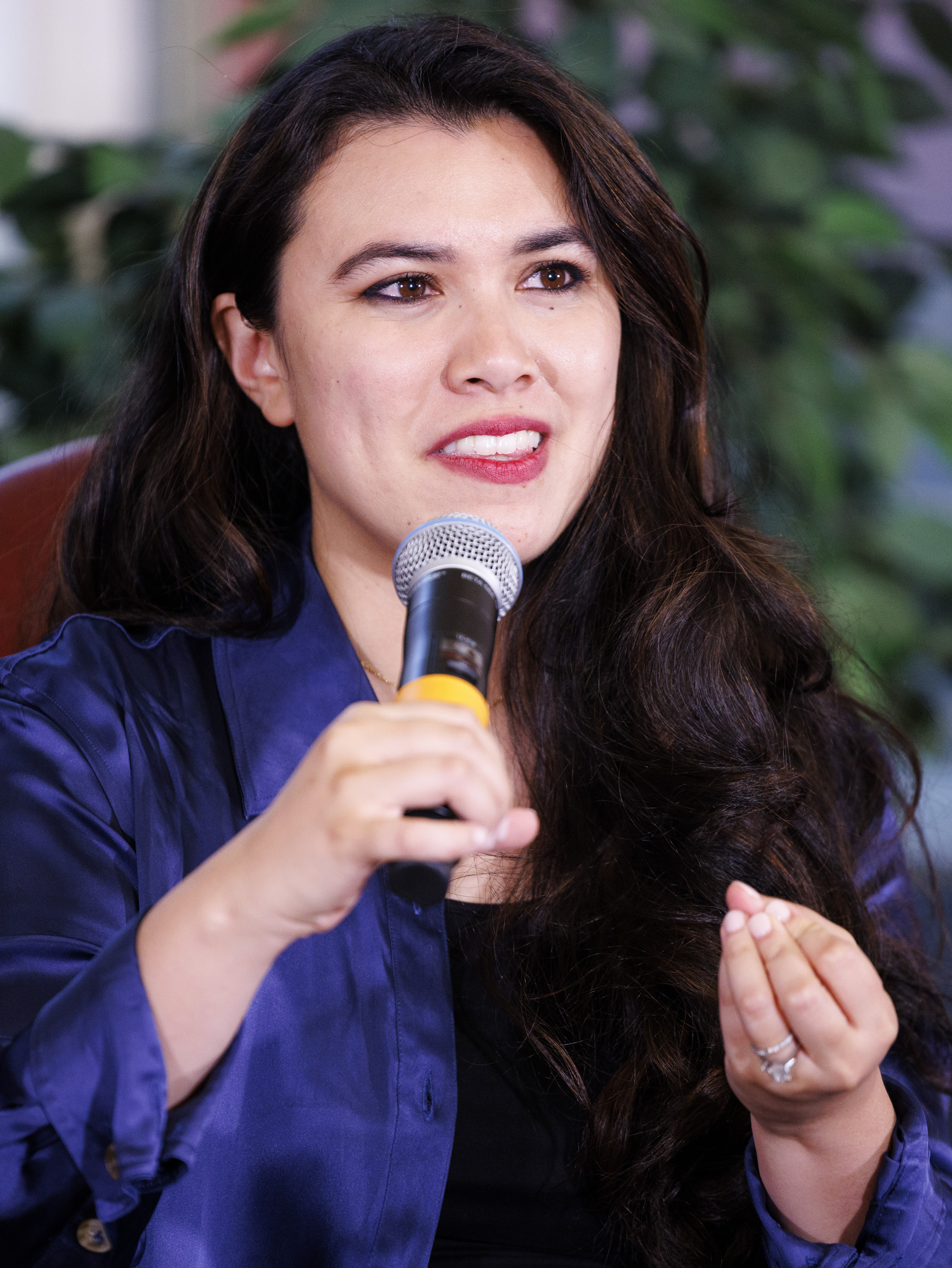
- Chokshi in 2024
- Born: February 14, 1991 (age 35); St. Louis, Missouri
- Education: Emory University
- Occupation: Novelist
- Children: 1
- Writing career
- Language: English
- Genres: Fantasy, Children's literature
- Notable works: The Star-Touched Queen, Aru Shah and the End of Time
- Website: roshanichokshi.com

Roshani Chokshi (born February 14, 1991) is an American children's book author and a New York Times bestselling author.

== Personal life ==
Chokshi's mother is Filipino and her father is Gujarati, from India, both immigrants to the United States. She grew up speaking English, rather than her parents' native languages, Tagalog and Gujarati. Chokshi was raised as a Hindu, which she often draws on in her novels. Her first novel sold while she attended law school at the University of Georgia, and she ultimately dropped out to pursue writing. She cites Neil Gaiman as one of her influences to pursue a writing career.

Chokshi lives in Georgia in the United States.

== Career ==
Chokshi's first young adult novel, novel The Star-Touched Queen, was published by St. Martin's Press in 2016. Her second young adult novel, A Crown of Wishes, is set in the same world and was published in 2017.

All of Chokshi's first novels in her series debuted on The New York Times bestseller list.

Her middle grade debut, Aru Shah and the End of Time, was the first title to launch under author Rick Riordan's Disney-Hyperion imprint, Rick Riordan Presents, in 2018. In April 2018, it was announced that Paramount Pictures won the movie rights, at auction, for Aru Shah and the End of Time. The Aru Shah series was originally intended to be four books long, but later discussions between Chokshi and the imprint led to the series being extended to end with fifth book, that was released in 2022.

The Gilded Wolves was published in 2019, the first novel of a trilogy and the start of Chokshi's second young adult series.

The Spirit Glass published in 2023, is a stand-alone title released by Rick Riordan Presents.

The Swan's Daughter, a standalone young adult fantasy novel, was published in 2025 by Wednesday Books.

The Family Goodfolke, a new standalone middle-grade fantasy novel, will be published in 2027 by Penguin Random House.

== Works ==
=== Young adult novels ===
==== The Star Touched Queen series ====
1. The Star-Touched Queen (2016)
2. A Crown of Wishes (2017)
3. Death and Night (novella, 2017)
4. Star-Touched Stories (collection, 2018), collection of three novellas including Death and Night

==== The Gilded Wolves series ====
1. The Gilded Wolves (2019)
2. The Silvered Serpents (2020)
3. The Bronzed Beasts (2021)

Standalone books

- The Swan's Daughter (2025)

=== Middle grade novels ===
==== Pandava Quintet ====
1. Aru Shah and the End of Time (2018)
2. Aru Shah and the Song of Death (2019)
3. Aru Shah and the Tree of Wishes (2020)
4. Aru Shah and the City of Gold (2021)
5. Aru Shah and the Nectar of Immortality (2022)

==== Standalone books ====
- The Spirit Glass (2023)
- The Family Goodfolke (2027)

=== Adult books ===
Standalone books

- Once More Upon a Time (2021)
- The Last Tale of the Flower Bride (2023)

=== Short stories ===
- The Vishakanya's Choice (Book Smugglers Publishing, 2015)
- The Wives of Azhar (Strange Horizons, 2015)
- Forbidden Fruit in A Thousand Beginnings and Endings (Greenwillow Books, 2018)
- Trade at the Fox Wedding (Mythic Delirium Books, 2016)
- The Cursed Carnival and Other Calamities (Disney Hyperion,2021)

== Awards ==
2020 Southern Book Prize (for The Gilded Wolves)

=== Nominations ===
2020 Georgia Author of the Year (for Aru Shah and the Song of Death)

2017 Locus Award for Best First Novel (for The Star-Touched Queen)

2017 Andre Norton Award (for The Star-Touched Queen)
