= Aranyani =

Hindu goddess of the forests

- Goddess of forests and wild animals
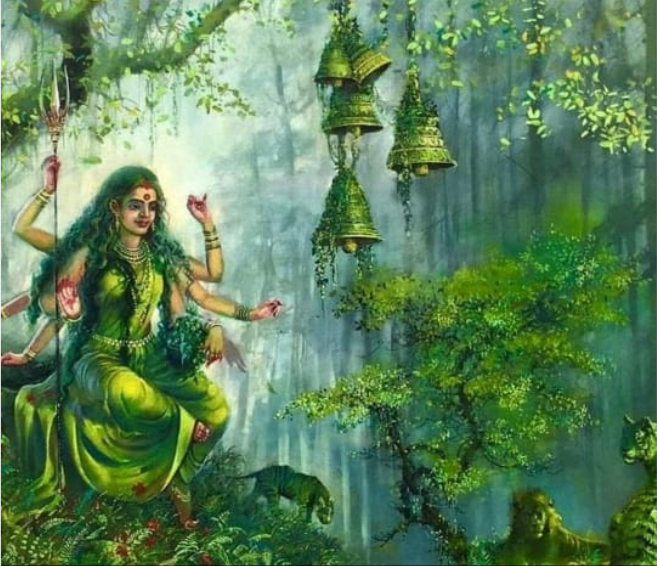
- Artwork of Aranyani.
- Affiliation: Devi
- Symbols: Anklets, trees, wild animals
- Mount: Horse
- Texts: Rigveda

Aranyani (Sanskrit: अरण्यानि, romanized: Araṇyānī, lit. 'forest') is the goddess of forests and the wild animals that dwell within them in Hinduism.

== Literature ==
Aranyani has the distinction of having one of the most descriptive hymns in the Rigveda dedicated to her. The Aranyani Suktam (Hymn 146 in the 10th mandala of the Rigveda) describes her as being elusive, fond of quiet glades in the jungle, and fearless of remote places. In the hymn, the supplicant entreats her to explain how she wanders so far from the fringe of civilisation without becoming afraid or lonely. She wears anklets with bells, and though seldom seen, she can be heard by the tinkling of her anklets. She is also described as a dancer. Her ability to feed both man and animals though she 'tills no lands' is what the supplicant finds most marvellous. The hymn is repeated in Taittiriya Brahmana and interpreted by the commentator of that work.

Aranyani bears resemblance to latter day forest deities like Banbibi in West Bengal, Vanadevata in Goa and Konkan region, Vanadurga in parts of South India. Her worship has declined in modern-day Hinduism, and it is rare to find a temple dedicated to Aranyani. However, there is one in Arrah, Bihar known as the Aranya Devi Temple.

She is sometimes regarded to be the owner of Kalpavriksha, the divine tree.
