= Aru Shah and the Nectar of Immortality =

Pandava Quintet Book Five

- Cover of the 2022 Disney Press edition
- Author: Roshani Chokshi
- Cover artist: Abigail L. Dela Cruz
- Language: English
- Series: Pandava Quintet
- Genre: Fantasy, Children's Fiction, Adventure
- Publisher: Disney Hyperion (US) Scholastic Corporation (UK)
- Publication date: April 5, 2022
- Publication place: United States
- Media type: Print (hardcover) (paperback) (audiobook) (e-book)
- Pages: 384
- ISBN: 978-1368055444
- Preceded by: Aru Shah and the City of Gold

Aru Shah and the Nectar of Immortality is an American fantasy-adventure novel written by Roshani Chokshi, published under the "Rick Riordan Presents" imprint on April 5, 2022. It is the fifth and final novel in the Pandava Quintet. Aru and her allies must stop the Sleeper gaining the titular Nectar of Immortality before the next full moon, to prevent him from gaining "infinite power."

== Synopsis ==
Continuing from “Aru Shah and the City of Gold”, Aru Shah, Mini, Brynne, and Aiden respond to Kara's decision to join the Sleeper. The Council of Guardians communicates that the nectar of immortality, called amrita, is located in the Otherworld. The acquisition of the nectar would enable control over both the mortal and immortal realms.

The group seeks information regarding the nectar’s location. They determine that the nectar is likely at the Ocean of Milk. Access to the nectar requires collecting five segments of a map. These map fragments are placed in various locations, each with obstacles originating from Hindu mythology. Some locations are protected by mythological beings or illusions. During the acquisition of the map segments, the Pandavas encounter Kara and the Sleeper, who are pursuing the same objective. The Pandavas proceed through challenges and obtain all the map fragments.

Upon completing the map, the group enters the Ocean of Milk. Additional obstacles are presented, including tests delivered through visions and external threats. The group advances through these challenges and arrives at the center of the Ocean.

Kara and the Sleeper arrive at the Ocean of Milk. A confrontation occurs between the Pandavas, Kara, and the Sleeper regarding possession of the amrita. Information about the family history and motivations of several characters is revealed. Aru decides to smash the cauldron containing the amrita so everyone’s stories can be told. The boundary between the worlds is retained.

Following these events, the Pandavas receive recognition from the gods. The main characters return to the mortal world. The book and series ends with Aru telling her story to Valmiki as she promised in the first book.

== Characters ==
- Aru Shah (books 1–5) is the protagonist of the series. She is the biological daughter of The Sleeper and Krithika Shah and the soul daughter of Indra, the god of rain, thunder, and storms. She is the reincarnation of the Pandava Arjuna and wields a lightning bolt named Vajra.
- Mini Kapoor-Mercado-Lopez (books 1–5) is a smart but anxious Pandava sister and the soul daughter of Dharma Raja, the god of death. She meets Aru in the beginning of End of Times. She is the reincarnation of the Pandava Yudhishthira and wields a Death Danda named Dee Dee.
- Brynne Rao (books 2–5) is a shape-shifting Pandava with asura lineage and the soul daughter of Vayu, the god of wind. She joins the heroes in book two to help them find the god of love's bow and arrow. She is the reincarnation of the Pandava Bhima and wields a wind mace called Gogo.
- Nikita Jagan and Sheela Jagan (books 3–5) are twin pandavas who are the soul daughters of the Ashvins, the twin gods of health and medicine. They are the reincarnations of the Pandavas Nakula and Sahadeva respectively. Sheela is prophetic and provides the team (dubbed "The Potatoes") with knowledge of the future.
- Aiden Acharya (books 2–5) is the son of an Apsara, a friend of Brynne and a "Pandava-adjacent". He is the reincarnation of Draupadi, the wife of the Pandavas, and wields a camera, which he names Shadowfax, as well as a pair of scimitars which he uses as weapons.
- Kara (books 4–5) is the half-sister of Aru. She is the adopted daughter of The Sleeper and the soul daughter of Surya, the god of the sun. Though initially at odds with the characters because of her father, she joins their group in book four. She is the reincarnation of Karna, the unknown brother of the Pandavas and wields a trident called Sunny.
- Prince Rudra of Naga-Loka (books 1–5), also known as Rudy, is a Naga companion of the Pandavas, the Grandson of Takshaka, a descendant of Ulupi and Aiden's cousin. He possesses little knowledge of human society.
- Boo (books 1–4) is a talking pigeon. His full name is Subala. He is a friend and mentor to the Pandava sisters. He later betrays them to the Sleeper, surprisingly, but only to protect them. He later reincarnates as a firebird, whom the Pandavas dub "BB," for "Baby-Boo." His true identity is that of Shakuni, the maternal uncle of the Kauravas.
- The Sleeper (books 1–5), also known as Suyodhana, is the father of Aru and Kara and the main antagonist of the series. He was awakened by Aru unwittingly in the beginning of book one. His true identity is that of Duryodhana, the eldest among the Kauravas.
- Lady M (book 2) is the main antagonist of Song of Death and the thief who stole the god of love's bow and arrow. Her true identity was that of the rakshasi Meenakshi. She was killed by Aru.
- Hanuman (books 1-5), as himself (Hanuman) from Hindu Mythology. He is one of the Pandavas' gurus.
- Urvashi (books 1-5), as herself (Urvashi) from Hindu Mythology. She is one of the Pandavas' gurus, and Aiden's mother's cousin.
- Garuda (books 3-5), based on the bird king Garuda from Hindu Mythology. He is on the Council of Guardians, and meets the Pandavas in Great Smoky Mountains National Park, on their third adventure.
- Jambavan (book 5), known as the fierce bear king. He is on the Council of Guardians, and meets the Pandavas on their quest to obtain the Syamantaka Jewel (or the sun jewel) to stop the Sleeper from gaining immortality.

== Reception ==
Common Sense Media had awarded Aru Shah and the Nectar of Immortality four out of five stars, stating that it was "a well-balanced and highly enjoyable finale." Laughing Place, had called it "the perfect bookend to an incredible tale" and "a four-star delight...the perfect way to start the spring reading season."

Business Insider listed it as one of the twenty-two most awaited audiobooks of 2022. Kirkus Reviews said that it was a "deeply satisfying conclusion to a superb, groundbreaking series" with "Chokshi's trademark humor and wit."
