= Snake-stone =

Folk medicine for curing snake bites

A snake-stone, also known as a viper's stone, snake's pearl, black stone, serpent-stone, or nagamani is an animal bone or stone used as folk medicine for snake bite in Africa, South America, the Indian subcontinent and Asia.

The World Health Organization states that it has no effect on snake-bites, bearing in mind that most snake-bites are from non-venomous snakes. They state that traditional medicines and other treatments such as wound incision or excision, suction, or application of "black stones" should be avoided.

== Descriptions ==
Accounts differ widely on how to make and use a 'black stone'.

In Peru, a black stone is a small charred cow bone "applied to the site of a poisonous snakebite and tied firmly in place. It is left there for several days, during which time it supposedly draws the venom from the wound."

13th century Persian/Iranian writer Kazwini describes the snake-stone in his work Aja'ib al-Makhluqat as being the size of a small nut. The quote about how the cure goes is as follows "An injury inflicted by a venomous creature is to be immersed in warm water or sour milk. The snake-stone is then dropped into the liquid to supposedly draw out the poison."

Although called a 'stone' in the Congo, a black stone is often made from animal bones. When taken from snakes, it is usually from the head, but also said to be extracted from the tail.

The steps suggested in an African leaflet are:

- Choose a large dry cow thigh bone
- Cut it into small pieces
- Smooth them with sandpaper
- Wrap the pieces in foil
- Place in a charcoal fire for 15 to 20 minutes

== Views on snake-stones expressed in scientific studies ==
A Nigerian study recommended "education on the need to avoid the use of popular first aid measures of doubtful benefit." The same doctors later reported that black stones may be beneficial, but "those who used the black stone required significantly higher quantity of antivenom as compared to those that used the tourniquet". In their report they noted slightly higher tissue necrosis in patients who use tourniquets, but this was not (statistically) significant; other scientists have recommended against tourniquets (see treatment of snakebites and outdated treatments).

A Bolivian medical study stated: "contrary to widespread belief, no efficacy to treat envenomation may be expected of the BS" (black stone).

An Indian study stated: "unscientific methods like 'black stone' healing contribute to the delay in seeking appropriate medical care."

== In popular media ==
- In the 1986 Indian film Nagina, snake stone was the main subject.
- In the 2008 Neil Gaiman novel The Graveyard Book, an item in the book was a snake stone described as rare and valuable.
- In the 2017 Indian Bengali novel Sarpa Manav: Nagmoni Rohosyo, the basis of the story was snake stone.
- Snake stones are mentioned as a folk remedy by the father/narrator in The Swiss Family Robinson.

== See also ==
- Madstone (folklore)
