= Chakora (mythology) =

Partridge in Hindu mythology

Chakora (Sanskrit: चकोर, romanized: Chakora) is a legendary bird described in Hindu mythology. It is considered to be a partridge, most likely based on the chukar partridge. In texts such as the Mṛcchakatika, it is believed to feed on the beams of the moon (Chandra). The association of the chakora and Chandra has given rise to a number of folk love stories in North India.
