= Disney Publishing Worldwide =

Publishing subsidiary of Disney Consumer Products and Interactive Media

- Formerly: The Disney Publishing Group; (1991–98); Buena Vista Publishing; (1998–99)
- Type: Subsidiary
- Industry: Publishing
- Founded: May 23, 1991; 35 years ago
- Founder: Michael Lynton
- Headquarters: Glendale, California
- Number of locations: 2 creative centers (2009)
- Area served: Worldwide
- Key people: Tonya Agurto; (SVP, Group Publisher)
- Parent: Disney Consumer Products
- Divisions: Core Publishing; Digital Publishing; NG Media
- Subsidiaries: Disney Book Group, LLC; Disney Learning; Disney Magazine Publishing, Inc.; Marvel Comics
- Website: books.disney.com

Disney Publishing Worldwide (DPW), formerly The Disney Publishing Group and Buena Vista Publishing Group, is the publishing division of The Walt Disney Company, operating under Disney Consumer Products within the Disney Entertainment business segment. Its imprints include Disney Editions, Disney Press, Kingswell, Freeform, and Hyperion Books for Children. It maintains creative centers in Glendale, California, and Milan, Italy.

== History ==
In 1990, Disney Consumer Products discontinued its license for Topolino, an Italian Mickey Mouse magazine. This led Michael Lynton, the Disney Consumer Products business development director, to start up its own Magazine Group with the similarly outlaid Disney Adventures. Through Walt Disney Publications, Inc., Disney Publishing launched Disney Comics in the United States. That same year, Disney began publishing Disney Adventures. In 1991, Disney Publishing purchased Discover magazine from Family Media, placing it within its Magazine Group, and purchased the FamilyFun Magazine after its second issue from Jake Winebaum.

=== Incorporated ===
The Disney Publishing Group (DPG) was incorporated in January 1992, and included the already formed Hyperion Books, Hyperion Books for Children, Disney Press, and its units.

In 1994, DPG launched the Mouse Works and Fun Works divisions in February and November, respectively, to publish interactive children's books. By April, the Magazine Group agreed with Ziff-Davis Publishing Company to a joint venture publication, Family PC, to be launched in September. In June, Lynton left his position as senior vice president of DPG to become president of Disney's Hollywood Pictures.

In March 1995, with the market too crowded with Disney books, DPG merged Hyperion Books for Children with the Disney Press units. In August, Disney Magazine Publishing was reorganized into three divisions, each headed by a vice president/group publisher: Disney Family Magazines, Disney Kids Magazines, and Disney Special Interest Magazines. Family Magazines and Special Interest Magazines were expected to acquire additional publications beyond their single titles, Family Fun and Discover respectively. Special Interest Magazines' publisher was assigned responsibility for the Discovery Channel TV show, Discover Magazine. Kids Magazines included the newly developed Big Time weekly newspaper supplement to have a Fall 1996 launch. Magazine President Jake Winebaum was transferred to head up Disney Online. On May 11, 1998, Disney Publishing was renamed Buena Vista Publishing Group.

=== Disney Publishing Worldwide ===
In April 1999, Buena Vista Publishing Group changed its name to Disney Publishing Worldwide, Inc. (DPW) with Hyperion Books transferred to Disney's ABC Television Group.

Disney Publishing launched its first original comic book, W.I.T.C.H., in 2001. It was successful, selling one million copies per month by August 2004, and was adapted into an animated series. In mid-2001, DPW and Baby Einstein (which Disney acquired later that year) agreed to publish a baby book line to introduce fine art, foreign languages, poetry, and classical music. Gemstone Publishing licensed the rights to publish Disney comics from DPW beginning in June 2003. Following its collapse in June 2004, the CrossGen trademark and properties were purchased by DPW's educational publishing division that November for its reading aids, with additional publications based on CrossGen books.

Wondertime magazine, November 2008

The Disney Consumer Products Disney Fairies franchise debuted in September 2005, when Disney Publishing unveiled the novel Fairy Dust and the Quest for the Egg paired with a virtual world. The first book in the Kingdom Keepers series, based on Disney Parks and Disney Villains, was released on August 29, 2005.

In 2005, Discover Magazine was sold to Bob Guccione Jr., and the Disney magazine was shut down. In February 2006, Wondertime magazine, which focused on mothers of children up to age six, was launched. DPW licensed CrossGen to Checker Publishing Group to reprint the comic book series as trade paperback editions starting in February 2007.

In February 2007, Disney merged its kids and family-focused television, online, radio, and publishing businesses' advertising sales and promotion teams into Disney Media Advertising Sales and Marketing Group, all of which were overseen by the presidents of Disney Channels Worldwide, Walt Disney Internet Group, and DPW. DPW canceled Disney Adventure with its November 2007 issue.

By 2009, Disney Publishing Worldwide was organized into three divisions: Global Book Group, Disney English, and Global Magazines with four revenue areas: Global Magazines, Global Books, U.S. Magazines, and Disney English. Disney Publishing launched Disney Digital Books on September 29 with five hundred books online. In 2009, Disney Press released Fairest of All: A Tale of the Wicked Queen, the first of the Villains book series written by Serena Valentino.

Disney Publishing Worldwide (India), a division of Walt Disney Company (India), announced a licensing agreement in April 2009 with local publisher Junior Diamond to publish Disney comic books, in both English and Hindi. On December 8, 2010, DPW's India unit signed a multi-year contract with India Today Group to print and distribute Disney comics in India.

With few books issued under the imprint, Marvel Worldwide and Disney Books Group relaunched the Marvel Press imprint in 2011 with the Marvel Origin Storybooks line. In November DPW announced a new publication, FamilyFun Kids, a bi-monthly magazine with kids' crafts, games, puzzles, and recipes. In January 2012, DPW agreed to sell Family Fun Magazine to the Meredith Corporation.

By September 2012, the White Plains, New York office was closed with staff being moved to Glendale after less than 5 years after moving from New York City. Fifty sales and marketing staff moved to New York City to join editors that remained there. In July 2012, Andrew Sugerman was promoted to EVP, Disney Publishing Worldwide, and the headquarters for the business was relocated to Glendale, CA to sit within Disney Consumer Products.

In January 2013, DPW launched the Never Girls book series, an extension of the Disney Fairies franchise, with publishing partner Random House. With the June 2013 announcement of the Hyperion Books division sale, Hyperion's adult trade book list was sold to Hachette Book Group. Books related to existing Disney–ABC Television Group properties, young adult titles, and Disney-Hyperion imprint and titles were transferred to DPW. By January 2014, the Kingswell name was selected as a placeholder imprint name for the Hyperion titles withheld from the Hyperion division sale; Kingwell Avenue was Disney's location before moving to Hyperion Avenue.

In November 2013, Disney Publishing revived Disney Comics as an imprint in the US for sporadic publishing. The imprint's first publication was the Space Mountain graphic novel, its first original graphic novel, released on May 7, 2014.

Disney Publishing Worldwide transferred the Disney Fairies franchise's main publishing license to Little, Brown Books for Young Readers in January 2014 except for the Never Girls series. DPW announced in April 2014 that Del Rey Books would publish a new line of canon Star Wars books under the Lucasfilm Story Group from September onward on a bi-monthly schedule while previous, non-canon, Expanded Universe material would be reprinted under the Star Wars Legends banner.

Disney Publishing has been a focus for Disney Consumer Products to launch new franchises. In May 2014, DPW released the first book in the Waterfire Saga mermaid book series, along with songs and music videos. Disney's first deal with Stan Lee's POW! Entertainment resulted in The Zodiac Legacy book series, with the first novel released in January 2015 through DPW. The Never Girls chapter series reached the New York Times Best Sellers List - Children's Series on the week of August 10. Disney Learning launched its Disney Imagicademy program on December 11. At that time, DPW was organized into three main units: Core Publishing, Digital Publishing, and Disney Learning. Between 2012 and 2015, Disney Publishing Worldwide's Digital Publishing group developed and distributed more than 100 top-ranked Apps across Apple iOS and Google Android making it one of the largest kids & family App publishers in the world.

Disney Consumer Products and Interactive Media (DCPI) was formed in June 2015 as a merger of Disney Consumer Products and Disney Interactive with Disney Publishing Worldwide reporting to the co-chairs of DCPI. DPW launched Star Darlings, its first franchise under DCPI, on September 15, 2015, with two books.

In October 2015, Disney Publishing announced the launch of the Freeform imprint to coincide with the relaunch of ABC Family as Freeform. This imprint was to be headed up by editor-in-chief and associate publisher Emily Thomas Meehan and would focus on young-adult and teen crossover fiction and nonfiction working with Freeform channel partners to develop new intellectual property from both developing and bestselling authors. The first book from Freeform was Two Truths and a Lie, written by Melissa de la Cruz and Margaret Stohl, and was the first in a trilogy.

Disney-Hyperion started a new imprint, Rick Riordan Presents, for middle-grade readers featuring mythology-based books by September 2016. Riordan would act in a curator-type role and his editor, Stephanie Owens Lurie, would be editorial director of the imprint. The imprint was planned to be launched with two books in 2018. By April 2017, the imprint had acquired three titles for its 2018 launch with audio rights sold to Listening Library. Riordan Presents first book, Aru Shah and the End of Time, will be written by Roshani Chokshi to be published in April 2018 and will be the first in a quartet of novels. The other two, Yoon Ha Lee's Dragon Pearl Korean folklore novel and Jennifer Cervantes' Mayan-based Storm Runner novel, will be stand-alone novels released in September 2018.

As part of The Walt Disney Company's March 2018 strategic reorganization, Disney Consumer Products and Interactive Media was merged into the Walt Disney Parks segment and renamed Disney Experiences. With the acquisition of 21st Century Fox by Disney in August 2019, National Geographic Partners publishing operations, NG Media, were transferred to Disney Publishing while ending Traveler magazine's US edition.

With group publisher Mary Ann Naples exiting Hachette Books, in May Disney Publishing promoted two to take up Naples' duties. Lynn Waggoner continued as vice president and global publisher, of the franchise while adding Disney Press, Marvel Press, Lucasfilm Press, and Disney Editions imprints. Emily Thomas Meehan moved up from director, editor-in-chief, and associate publisher of the Disney Book Group to vice president and publisher of Hyperion, original content strategy and IP development.

In February 2020, Hachette Book Group acquired 1,000 titles for young readers from Disney Book Group. These books will be re-released by Little, Brown Books for Young Readers. In 2022, it was announced that Penguin Random House will take over the distribution of Disney Publishing Worldwide titles from 2023 onwards.

On March 29, 2023, as a part of a corporate restructuring to fold Marvel Entertainment into The Walt Disney Company, Marvel Comics was placed under Disney Publishing Worldwide.

On May 2, 2025, PRH expanded their licensing agreement with Disney Publishing Worldwide to include new and future titles from their brands across a wide number of book formats.

== Franchises ==
Disney Publishing launched unplanned franchises starting with W.I.T.C.H. in 2001. DPW's educational division purchased the CrossGen comic book assets in November 2004. DPW was then drafted as an outlet for Disney Consumer Products' planned franchises: Disney Fairies, Disney Bunnies (and their extensions), the Never Girls book series, and Disney Princess Palace Pets apps. DPW started to originate planned franchises with the Waterfire Saga in 2014 and The Zodiac Legacy and Star Darlings in 2015.

- CrossGen – purchased the franchise in November 2004 for reading aids plus the development of other assets by Hyperion Books for Children. Its Abadazad fantasy series was reworked as a prose/comic hybrid format releasing two volumes in June 2006 of a planned series of eight volumes, up from the original four. The franchise was restarted as an imprint by Marvel Comics in March 2011.
- Kingdom Keepers – a seven-book series based on the Disney parks features holographic guardians fighting against some of the Disney Villains called Overtakers. The first book was released on August 29, 2005.
- Twisted Tales – started as a book series with various authors writing twists on Disney films. Current contributors include authors Liz Braswell, Elizabeth Lim, and Jen Calonita.
- Star Darlings – launched with two chapter books in September 2015.
- W.I.T.C.H. – launched as a comic book in 2001 and expanded with an animated series in 2004.
- Waterfire Saga – launched with the first novel of a tetralogy in May 2014.
- The Zodiac Legacy – expected franchise launched as a book series in January 2015.

=== Waterfire Saga ===
Waterfire Saga
- Created by: Disney Publishing staff Jennifer Donnelly
- Original work: novel

Print publications
- Novels: Deep Blue; Rogue Wave; Dark Tide; Sea Spell

Audio
- Original music: "Open Your Eyes"; Hollywood Records

Waterfire Saga is a Disney Publishing franchise based on mermaids launched in May 2014 as a multimedia release around a core book series.

==== Waterfire history ====
The Waterfire Saga was developed by Disney Publishing's various departments after some years of considering doing a mermaid mythology project. A 200-page franchise bible was compiled that included cultures, story arcs, images of the undersea world and its inhabitants, and main character profiles. In the summer of 2011, Global Books' publisher Suzanne Murphy approached Jennifer Donnelly to write the book series. Donnelly agreed.

In early 2014, Disney Publishing Worldwide announced the launch of the Waterfire Saga. By March 2014, Donnelly had already finished work on the first two books and had started on the third. The first novel, Deep Blue, was released under the Disney-Hyperion imprint on May 6, 2014, with a print run of 250,000 copies and a national book tour. The novel's marketing plan included advertising in print, TV, and in-theater; ABC Family and Hollywood Records would run additional promotions as well as a retail floor display with a riser. A song and music videos were included in the simultaneous e-book edition release. The book was released simultaneously in the United Kingdom, Italy, and Spain. Other foreign editions were to be released in late 2014 and early 2015. The second book in the series, Rogue Wave, was released in January 2015. In 2015, DPW's Milan comic unit was scheduled to start issuing comics and graphic novels to expand the franchise. Dark Tide was released in the Summer of 2015 and the final book, Sea Spell was released in the Summer of 2016.

==== Plot ====
Merpeople came into existence after their ancestors' island of Atlantis was destroyed. The 4-book series centers around 6 mermaids who try to save their world. Deep Blue initially focuses on Serafina, a mermaid of the Mediterranean Sea, who has a premonitory dream about an ancient evil returning on the eve of her betrothal. Her mother is hit by an assassin's poisoned arrow, which confirms the dream. She has additional visions that lead her to find five other mermaids across the world's oceans. The six bond and find a world-threatening conspiracy.

==== Additional media ====
An audiobook version of Deep Blue was recorded by Bea Miller and released through Listening Library. In 2015, DPW's Milan comic unit was to begin issuing yet-to-be-announced comics and graphic novels to expand the franchise. The song "Open Your Eyes" was issued through Hollywood Records, and is sung by Bea Miller.

=== Zodiac Legacy ===
Zodiac Legacy
- Created by: Stan Lee
- Original work: novel

Print publications
- Books: The Zodiac Archives; The Vanguard Archives
- Novels: Convergence; The Dragon's Return; The Balance of Power
- Comics: Tiger Island

Miscellaneous
- Website: disneyzodiac.com

The Zodiac Legacy is a superhero franchise created by Stan Lee that debuted in illustrated novels published by Disney Publishing with POW! Entertainment under the Disney Press imprint. Working with Stan Lee on the books are co-writer Stuart Moore and Andie Tong, artist.

The first illustrated novel, The Zodiac Legacy: Convergence was released on January 27, 2015. The second novel in the illustrated series, The Dragon's Return, was released on January 26, 2016. Dragon's Return made the New York Times best-seller list for the week ending January 30, 2016. With Papercutz, the first Zodiac Legacy graphic novel, Tiger Island, hit the stands on March 30, 2016, with the writing team joined by artist Paris Cullins. In early April 2017, the third and final book in the trilogy, The Balance of Power, was released. By that time, a second Papercutz graphic novel in the series was released with art from P.H. Marcondes. In July 2017, the third graphic novel was released.

Plot: The series follows a Chinese-American eighth grader from Philadelphia going on a Hong Kong class trip. He finds himself involved with an ancient secret unleashing twelve Zodiac magical superpowers. The eighth grader, Steven, has to deal with being a superhero and how that affects him, his family, and his friends as he ends up in the middle of a worldwide adventure. In the second book, Steven attempts to keep his allies together as they enter a gray area.

=== Star Darlings ===
Star Darlings
- Created by: Shana Muldoon Zappa; Ahmet Zappa
- Original work: Books

Print publications
- Books: Sage and the Journey to Wishworld; Libby and the Class Election; Leona's Unlucky Mission; Vega and the Fashion Disaster; Scarlet Discovers True Strength; Cassie Comes Through; Piper's Perfect Dream; Astra's Mixed-Up Mission; Tessa's Lost and Found; Adora Finds a Friend; Clover's Parent Fix; Gemma and the Ultimate Standoff; Star Darlings Collection Volume 1 Star Darlings Collection Volume 2 Star Darlings Collection Volume 3 Star Darlings Collection Volume 4 A Wisher's Guide to Starland

Films and television
- Short films: YouTube Animated Series (12 Episodes and 12 Clips)
- Television specials: Becoming Star Darlings; Star Darlings Friendships; The Power of Twelve

Audio
- Original music: "Wish Now"; "Up"; "Starlight"; "Wish Now" remix

Miscellaneous
- Toys: Starland Fashion Dolls; Wishworld Fashion Dolls; by Jakks Pacific
- music video: "Wish Now" remix
- website: books.disney.com/stardarlings/

Star Darlings is a Disney Publishing multimedia franchise based on an original wish-granting fey people called the Starlings. Star Darlings is a trademark of Star Darlings, LLC. owned by DPW.

Barry Waldo was selected to manage the franchise, which is an inspirational brand targeted at tweens designed to: "celebrate their individuality, make positive choices, and turn their wishes into reality". Justice is the franchise's primary retail partner carrying Jakks Pacific doll line, clothing, and books. Disney Stores would carry a limited product line.

The Star Darlings plot is about 12 young Starlings at Starling Academy on Starland who learn about Wishworld (Earth) and are selected to go on a secret mission there. Sage, Libby, and Leona are the Star Darlings up first for books with the other nine being Adora, Astra, Cassie, Clover, Gemma, Piper, Scarlet, Tessa, and Vega.

==== Star Darlings history ====
Shana Muldoon first registered a trademark for the Star Darling name in 2009, but it was considered abandoned for lack of use on April 11, 2011. Shana Muldoon Zappa, Ahmet Zappa, and Disney Publishing began development in 2011 on Star Darlings. On March 29, 2013, Star Darlings, LLC filed to register the trademark with two extensions granted with the last given on May 29, 2015.

The franchise was announced at the D23 convention in August 2015 and launched on September 15, 2015, with two chapter books Sage and the Journey to Wishworld and Libby and the Class Election. Kirkus Reviews found the first volume, Sage and the Journey to Wishworld, to be "complicated, retrograde, and very sparkly" and for ages seven to eleven.

On September 24, 2015, a social media event and a press day would be held for the franchise as part of its launch phase of the marketing campaign. Expected releases through November are the Jakks dolls at Justice, a storytelling and lifestyle app, music through Walt Disney Records, and the first episode of a YouTube animated series.

In 2016, two animated specials based on Star Darlings were broadcast on Disney Channel, Becoming Star Darlings on January 29 and Star Darlings Friendships on March 25. The TV specials featured a remixed version of the Star Darlings theme song by singer-songwriter Skylar Stecker. The remixed theme song was also featured in a music video. Another TV special, The Power of Twelve (22 minutes) was broadcast on Disney Channel on November 26, 2016.

The future of this series is unknown as three books that were supposed to be released after Stealing Starlight were canceled, with no new franchise activity after its release on January 17, 2017. However, Shana Muldoon Zappa said on Twitter that there is "an exciting reason" for things being put on hold.

== Units ==
- Core Publishing
  - Disney Magazine Publishing, Inc.
    - Disney Comics
  - Disney Book Group (Disney Book Publishing, Inc.)
    - Disney·Hyperion
      - Rick Riordan Presents, imprint for middle grade readers featuring mythology-based books
    - Disney·Jump at the Sun
    - Disney-Lucasfilm Press
    - Disney Press
    - Disney Editions
    - Disney Libri
    - Disney Libros (Spain)
    - Marvel Press
    - ABC Daytime Press
    - ESPN Books
    - Kingswell
    - Freeform
    - National Geographic Books
    - National Geographic Maps
- Digital Publishing - Disney Book Apps
- Disney Learning, incorporated on March 7, 1996 as Disney Educational Publishing, Inc., and changed name by August 26, 2013 to Disney Learning
  - Disney Educational Productions
  - Disney English
  - Disney Imagicademy is a program of Disney Learning consisting of a suite of mobile learning apps for kids with over thirty apps planned. The first two apps were the parent companion app and Mickey's Magical Math World on iPad. The parent companion app allows parents to track their kids' advancement on the apps.
- Marvel Comics

=== Hyperion Books for Children ===
Hyperion Books for Children (HBC) and Disney Press were both launched in 1990. The Disney Publishing Group was incorporated in January 1992 and included the already-formed Hyperion Books, Hyperion Avenue Books, Hyperion Books for Children, Disney Press, and other units. In March 1995 with the market too crowded with Disney books, Hyperion Books for Children merged with Disney Press. Hyperion Books for Children started a new imprint, Jump at the Sun, in September 1998 for the African-American children's market. DPW slated the Abadazad four-book series from its CrossGen property for publication after purchasing the CrossGen assets under this imprint.
