= Andre Norton Award =

Science fiction and fantasy literary award

Andre Norton Nebula Award for Middle Grade and Young Adult Fiction
- Logo of the Andre Norton Award
- Awarded for: The best middle grade or young adult science fiction or fantasy novel published in the prior calendar year
- Presented by: Science Fiction and Fantasy Writers Association
- First award: 2006
- Currently held by: Michelle Knudsen (Into the Wild Magic)
- Website: nebulas.sfwa.org/

The Andre Norton Nebula Award for Middle Grade and Young Adult Fiction (formerly the Andre Norton Award for Young Adult Science Fiction and Fantasy) is an annual award presented by the Science Fiction and Fantasy Writers Association (SFWA) to the author of the best young adult or middle grade science fiction or fantasy book published in the United States in the preceding year. It is named to honor prolific science fiction and fantasy author Andre Norton (1912–2005), and it was established by then SFWA president Catherine Asaro and the SFWA Young Adult Fiction committee and announced on February 20, 2005. Any published young adult or middle grade science fiction or fantasy novel is eligible for the prize, including graphic novels. There is no limit on word count. The award was originally not a Nebula Award, despite being presented along with them and following the same rules for nominations and voting, but in 2019 SFWA announced that the award was considered a Nebula category.

Andre Norton Award nominees and winners are chosen by members of SFWA, though the authors of the nominees do not need to be members. Works are nominated each year by members in a period around December 15 through January 31, and the six works that receive the most nominations then form the final ballot, with additional nominees possible in the case of ties. Soon after, members are given a month to vote on the ballot, and the final results are presented at the Nebula Awards ceremony in May. Authors are not permitted to nominate their own works, and ties in the final vote are broken, if possible, by the number of nominations the works received. Beginning with the 2009 awards, the rules were changed to the current format. Previously, the eligibility period for nominations was defined as one year after the publication date of the work, which allowed works to be nominated in the calendar year after their publication and then be awarded in the calendar year after that. Works were added to a preliminary list for the year if they had ten or more nominations, which were then voted on to create a final ballot, to which the SFWA organizing panel was also allowed to add an additional work.

During the 21 nomination years, 103 authors have had works nominated, of which 20 have won. Fran Wilde is the only author to win twice, out of two nominations. Holly Black, Jenn Reese, and Scott Westerfeld have had the most nominations at four—with Black winning once and Reese and Westerfeld yet to win—followed by Sarah Beth Durst and Greg van Eekhout with three nominations each without winning. Black, Alaya Dawn Johnson, Delia Sherman, and Ysabeau S. Wilce are the only authors besides Wilde nominated multiple times to have won the award, with one win apiece out of four, two, two, and two nominations, respectively.

== Winners and nominees ==
SFWA currently identifies the awards by the year of publication, that is, the year prior to the year in which the award is given. Entries with a yellow background and an asterisk (*) next to the writer's name have won the award; the other entries are the other nominees on the shortlist.

* Winners and joint winners

Winners and nominees
Year	Author	Title	Publisher	Ref.
2005	Holly Black*	Valiant: A Modern Tale of Faerie	Simon & Schuster	
2005	Louise Spiegler	The Amethyst Road	Clarion Books	
2005	Ann Halam	Siberia	Wendy Lamb Books	
2005	Susan Vaught	Stormwitch	Bloomsbury Publishing	
2006	Justine Larbalestier*	Magic or Madness	Razorbill	
2006	Maureen Johnson	Devilish	Razorbill	
2006	Megan Whalen Turner	The King of Attolia	Greenwillow Books	
2006	Scott Westerfeld	Midnighters 2: Touching Darkness	Eos	
2006	Scott Westerfeld	Peeps	Razorbill	
2006	Susan Beth Pfeffer	Life as We Knew It	Harcourt	
2007	J. K. Rowling*	Harry Potter and the Deathly Hallows	Arthur A. Levine Books	
2007	Steve Berman	Vintage: A Ghost Story	Haworth Press	
2007	Sarah Beth Durst	Into the Wild	Razorbill	
2007	Nnedi Okorafor-Mbachu	The Shadow Speaker	Jump at the Sun	
2007	Adam Rex	The True Meaning of Smekday	Hyperion Books	
2007	Ysabeau S. Wilce	Flora Segunda	Harcourt	
2007	Elizabeth Wein	The Lion Hunter	Viking Juvenile	
2008	Ysabeau S. Wilce*	Flora's Dare	Harcourt	
2008	Kristin Cashore	Graceling	Harcourt	
2008	D. M. Cornish	Monster Blood Tattoo: Lamplighter	G. P. Putnam's Sons	
2008	Ingrid Law	Savvy	Walden Media	
2008	Mary E. Pearson	The Adoration of Jenna Fox	Henry Holt and Company	
2009	Catherynne M. Valente*	The Girl Who Circumnavigated Fairyland in a Ship of Her Own Making	catherynnemvalente.com	
2009	Kage Baker	Hotel Under the Sand	Tachyon Publications	
2009	Sarah Beth Durst	Ice	Margaret K. McElderry	
2009	Malinda Lo	Ash	Little, Brown and Company	
2009	Lisa Mantchev	Eyes Like Stars	Feiwel & Friends	
2009	John Scalzi	Zoe's Tale	Tor Books	
2009	Rebecca Stead	When You Reach Me	Wendy Lamb Books	
2009	Scott Westerfeld	Leviathan	Simon Pulse	
2010	Terry Pratchett*	I Shall Wear Midnight	Victor Gollancz Ltd	
2010	Paolo Bacigalupi	Ship Breaker	Little, Brown and Company	
2010	Holly Black	White Cat	Margaret K. McElderry	
2010	Suzanne Collins	Mockingjay	Scholastic Press	
2010	Barry Deutsch	Hereville: How Mirka Got Her Sword	Amulet Books	
2010	Pearl North	The Boy from Ilysies	Tor Teen	
2010	Megan Whalen Turner	A Conspiracy of Kings	Greenwillow Books	
2010	Scott Westerfeld	Behemoth	Simon Pulse	
2011	Delia Sherman*	The Freedom Maze	Big Mouth House	
2011	Nnedi Okorafor	Akata Witch	Viking Juvenile	
2011	Franny Billingsley	Chime	Dial Press	
2011	Laini Taylor	Daughter of Smoke and Bone	Little, Brown Books for Young Readers	
2011	A. S. King	Everybody Sees the Ants	Little, Brown Books for Young Readers	
2011	Greg van Eekhout	The Boy at the End of the World	Bloomsbury Children's Books	
2011	Rae Carson	The Girl of Fire and Thorns	Greenwillow Books	
2011	R. J. Anderson	Ultraviolet	Orchard Books	
2012	E. C. Myers*	Fair Coin	Pyr	
2012	Kelly Barnhill	Iron Hearted Violet	Little, Brown and Company	
2012	Holly Black	Black Heart	Victor Gollancz Ltd	
2012	Leah Bobet	Above	Arthur A. Levine Books	
2012	Libba Bray	The Diviners	Little, Brown and Company	
2012	Sarah Beth Durst	Vessel	Margaret K. McElderry	
2012	Rachel Hartman	Seraphina	Random House	
2012	Alethea Kontis	Enchanted	Harcourt	
2012	David Levithan	Every Day	Alice A. Knopf Books for Young Readers	
2012	Guadalupe Garcia McCall	Summer of the Mariposas	Tu Books	
2012	China Miéville	Railsea	Del Rey Books	
2012	Jenn Reese	Above World	Candlewick Press	
2013	Nalo Hopkinson*	Sister Mine	Grand Central Publishing	
2013	Holly Black	The Coldest Girl in Coldtown	Little, Brown and Company	
2013	Karen Healey	When We Wake	Little, Brown and Company	
2013	Alaya Dawn Johnson	The Summer Prince	Arthur A. Levine Books	
2013	Alethea Kontis	Hero	Harcourt	
2013	Bennett Madison	September Girls	Harper Teen	
2013	Jaclyn Moriarty	A Corner of White	Arthur A. Levine Books	
2014	Alaya Dawn Johnson*	Love Is the Drug	Arthur A. Levine Books	
2014	Sarah Rees Brennan	Unmade	Random House	
2014	Alexandra Duncan	Salvage	Greenwillow Books	
2014	A. S. King	Glory O'Brien's History of the Future	Little, Brown and Company	
2014	Sarah McCarry	Dirty Wings	St. Martin's Griffin	
2014	Kate Milford	Greenglass House	Clarion Books	
2014	Leslye Walton	The Strange and Beautiful Sorrows of Ava Lavender	Candlewick Press	
2015	Fran Wilde*	Updraft	Tor Books	
2015	Nicole Kornher-Stace	Archivist Wasp	Big Mouth House	
2015	Laura Ruby	Bone Gap	Balzer + Bray	
2015	Kate Elliott	Court of Fives	Little, Brown and Company	
2015	Frances Hardinge	Cuckoo Song	Macmillan Publishers, Amulet	
2015	ND Stevenson	Nimona	Harper Teen	
2015	Tina Connolly	Seriously Wicked	Tor Teen	
2015	Daniel José Older	Shadowshaper	Arthur A. Levine Books	
2015	Fonda Lee	Zeroboxer	Flux	
2016	David D. Levine*	Arabella of Mars	Tor Books	
2016	Kelly Barnhill	The Girl Who Drank the Moon	Algonquin Young Readers	
2016	Roshani Chokshi	The Star-Touched Queen	St. Martin's Press	
2016	Frances Hardinge	The Lie Tree	Macmillan Publishers, Abrams Books	
2016	Philip Reeve	Railhead	Oxford University Press, Switch Press	
2016	Lindsay Ribar	Rocks Fall, Everyone Dies	Kathy Dawson Books	
2016	Delia Sherman	The Evil Wizard Smallbone	Candlewick Press	
2017	Sam J. Miller*	The Art of Starving	HarperCollins	
2017	Fonda Lee	Exo	Scholastic Books	
2017	Kari Maaren	Weave a Circle Round	Tor Books	
2017	Cindy Pon	Want	Simon Pulse	
2018	Tomi Adeyemi*	Children of Blood and Bone	Henry Holt and Company	
2018	Roshani Chokshi	Aru Shah and the End of Time	Rick Riordan Presents	
2018	Justina Ireland	Dread Nation	Balzer + Bray	
2018	A. K. DuBoff	A Light in the Dark	BDL Press	
2018	Henry Lien	Peasprout Chen, Future Legend of Skate and Sword	Henry Holt and Company	
2018	Rachel Hartman	Tess of the Road	Random House	
2019	Fran Wilde*	Riverland	Amulet Paperbacks	
2019	Carlos Hernandez	Sal and Gabi Break the Universe	Rick Riordan Presents	
2019	Naomi Kritzer	Catfishing on CatNet	Tor Teen	
2019	Yoon Ha Lee	Dragon Pearl	Rick Riordan Presents	
2019	Henry Lien	Peasprout Chen: Battle of Champions	Henry Holt and Company	
2019	Greg van Eekhout	Cog	Harper	
2020	Ursula Vernon (as T. Kingfisher)*	A Wizard's Guide to Defensive Baking	Argyll Productions	
2020	Jordan Ifueko	Raybearer	Amulet Books	
2020	Darcie Little Badger	Elatsoe	Levine Querido	
2020	Jenn Reese	A Game of Fox & Squirrels	Henry Holt and Company	
2020	Shveta Thakrar	Star Daughter	HarperTeen	
2021	Darcie Little Badger*	A Snake Falls to Earth	Levine Querido	
2021	Xiran Jay Zhao	Iron Widow	Penguin Teen/Rock the Boat	
2021	Jordan Ifueko	Redemptor	Amulet Books/Hot Key Books	
2021	Eden Royce	Root Magic	Walden Pond Press	
2021	Leah Cypess	Thornwood	Delacorte Press	
2021	Charlie Jane Anders	Victories Greater Than Death	Tor Teen/Titan Books	
2022	K. Tempest Bradford*	Ruby Finley vs. the Interstellar Invasion	Farrar, Straus and Giroux	
2022	H. A. Clarke	The Scratch Daughters	Erewhon Books	
2022	Deva Fagan	The Mirrorwood	Atheneum Books	
2022	Maya MacGregor	The Many Half-Lived Lives of Sam Sylvester	Astra Young Readers	
2022	Jenn Reese	Every Bird a Prince	Henry Holt and Company	
2023	Moniquill Blackgoose*	To Shape a Dragon's Breath	Del Rey Books	
2023	J. Dianne Dotson	The Inn at the Amethyst Lantern	Android Press	
2023	Naomi Kritzer	Liberty's Daughter	Fairwood Press	
2023	Greg van Eekhout	The Ghost Job	HarperCollins	
2024	Vanessa Ricci-Thode*	The Young Necromancer's Guide to Ghosts	(self-published)	
2024	José Pablo Iriarte	Benny Ramírez and the Nearly Departed	Alice A. Knopf Books for Young Readers	
2024	Leah Cypess	Braided	Delacorte Press	
2024	Rob Cameron	Daydreamer	Labyrinth Road	
2024	Yoon Ha Lee	Moonstorm	Delacorte Press/Solaris Books	
2024	Jenn Reese	Puzzleheart	Henry Holt and Company	
2025	Michelle Knudsen*	Into the Wild Magic	Candlewick Press	
2025	David Anaxagoras	The Tower	Recorded Books	
2025	Jonathan Brazee	Gemini Rising	Semper Fi Press	
2025	Jubilee Cho	Wishing Well, Wishing Well	Atthis Arts	
2025	Suzanne Collins	Sunrise on the Reaping	Scholastic	
2025	K. A. Mielke	Goblin Girl	(self-published)	

== See also ==
- Lodestar Award
