= Scumble =

Scumble may refer to:

- Scumbling, a glaze painting technique
- Scumble, a novel by Ingrid Law
- Scumble, an alcoholic drink from Discworld made of apples. Well, mostly apples.
