= Thick as Thieves (Turner novel) =

Book by Megan Whalen Turner

- Author: Megan Whalen Turner
- Series: Queen's Thief
- Genre: Young-adult fantasy, political fiction
- Publisher: Greenwillow Books/ HarperCollins
- Publication date: May 2017
- Publication place: United States
- Media type: Print (hardcover), e-book
- Pages: 352
- ISBN: 978-0-06-256824-3
- LC Class: PZ7.T85565 Tg 2017
- Preceded by: A Conspiracy of Kings
- Followed by: Return of the Thief

Thick as Thieves is a 2017 young adult fantasy novel by Megan Whalen Turner, published by Greenwillow Books. It is the fifth novel in the Queen's Thief series that Turner began with The Thief in 1996.

== Setting ==
The novel is set in the fictional Mede Empire, a large domain that plots to swallow up the nearby countries of Attolia and Sounis.

== Background ==
The novel was originally intended to be part of The King of Attolia. However, Turner decided it would be too long and wrote it as a separate book. According to Turner, Thick as Thieves was inspired by The Eagle of the Ninth by Rosemary Sutcliff. Unlike in the original novel, Turner wanted to have the story told from the perspective of the slave character.

== Plot summary ==
The book picks up after the events of The Queen of Attolia when the Medes failed to establish the Queen of Attolia as a puppet monarch. Nahuseresh, the Medean ambassador and his slave Kamet were forced to flee the country after the botched invasion. Due to his failure in Attolia, Nahuseresh has fallen out of favor with his powerful brother, heir to the Medean throne.

As the secretary and scribe enslaved by Nahuseresh, Kamet has the ambition and means to become one of the most influential people in the Empire. However, after angering his master, Kamet is offered a risky opportunity to escape slavery by a mysterious foreigner claiming he was sent by the King of Attolia. Kamet is reluctant to leave his prestigious position, but when his fellow slave Laela warns him that their master has been poisoned, he believes he is left with little choice if he wants to live. Fleeing across the desert with the Attolian soldier (later revealed to be Costis of The King of Attolia) from the emperor's soldiers, Kamet attempts to prevent Costis from finding out that Nahuseresh is dead.

== Queen's Thief series ==
- 1996 The Thief
- 2000 The Queen of Attolia
- 2006 The King of Attolia
- 2010 A Conspiracy of Kings
- 2017 Thick as Thieves
- 2020 Return of the Thief
