= The Ghost Job =

Middle school novel by Greg van Eekhout

The Ghost Job is a middle school novel by Greg van Eekhout.

It was a finalist for the Nebula Award.
