= Peasprout Chen =

Book series by Henry Lien

Peasprout Chen is a children's book series by Henry Lien and published by Henry Holt Books for Young Readers.

== Premise ==
It follows a young girl who seeks to master the fictional martial art of wu liu, which involves figure skating.

== History ==
The first book, Peasprout Chen, Future Legend of Skate and Sword, was published on April 3, 2018. The second book, Battle of Champions, was published on January 22, 2019.

== Reception ==
The first book received a starred review in Publishers Weekly, and The New York Times recommended the audiobook for summer road trips with children. The second book received a starred review from Kirkus Reviews.

Peasprout Chen, Future Legend of Skate and Sword was nominated for the 2018 Nebula Award/Andre Norton Award. Peasprout Chen: Battle of Champions was nominated for the 2019 Nebula Award/Andre Norton Award.
