= Wilce =

Wilce is a surname. Notable people with the surname include:

- John Wilce (1888–1963), American football player and coach, physician, and university professor
- Ysabeau S. Wilce, American author
