= A Conspiracy of Kings =

2010 novel by Megan Whalen Turner

- First edition cover
- Author: Megan Whalen Turner
- Cover artist: Vince Natale
- Series: Queen's Thief
- Genre: Young-adult fantasy, political fiction
- Publisher: Greenwillow Books/ HarperCollins
- Publication date: March 2010
- Publication place: United States
- Media type: Print (hardcover), e-book
- Pages: 316 (print)
- ISBN: 0-06-187095-1
- OCLC: 419854908
- LC Class: PZ7.T85565 Co 2010
- Preceded by: The King of Attolia
- Followed by: Thick as Thieves

A Conspiracy of Kings is a young adult fantasy novel by Megan Whalen Turner, published by the Greenwillow Books imprint of HarperCollins in 2010. It is the fourth novel in the Queen's Thief series that Turner inaugurated with The Thief in 1996.

The first five chapters were released on the HarperCollins Children's Books site for previewing purposes.

The trade paper edition of August 2011 appends to the novel an original Queen's Thief short story, "Destruction", and several nonfiction items.

== Setting ==
The books are set in a Byzantine-like imaginary landscape, reminiscent of ancient Greece and other territories around the Mediterranean. The action takes place in the countries of Eddis, Attolia, and Sounis. The characters' names are Greek, and references are made to actual Greek authors, but this is fantasy, not historical fiction. The gods of Turner's pantheon, ruled by the Great Goddess Hephestia, are her own, and her world possesses such items as guns and pocket watches.

== Plot ==
Sophos, the Magus's once studious young protégé, finds himself out of his element as his family is ambushed in their villa in Sounis. Sophos at first succeeds in evading capture and hiding his mother and sisters, but is betrayed by the servants. Mistakenly sold into slavery, he finds himself content with manual labor and forms a camaraderie with the other slaves. However, when faced with a choice between a life of contentment or influence, he chooses the latter.

After a harrowing escape from the Baron who owned him, Sophos inherits the throne of Sounis. Not only is his country deadlocked in war with Attolia, it is also torn by a civil war. With neither the monetary resources nor manpower to secure his throne, Sophos is faced with several options, each with heavy consequences. Aided by the Magus, he turns to his old friend Eugenides, the former Thief of Eddis, with whom Sophos traveled years before and who is now the King of Attolia.

== Queen's Thief series ==
- 1996 The Thief
- 2000 The Queen of Attolia
- 2006 The King of Attolia
- 2010 A Conspiracy of Kings
- 2017 Thick as Thieves
- 2020 Return of the Thief
