= Instead of Three Wishes =

Book by Megan Whalen Turner

- First edition
- Author: Megan Whalen Turner
- Cover artist: Jos. A. Smith
- Language: English
- Genre: Young-adult Fiction
- Publication place: United States
- Media type: Print (hardback & paperback)

Instead of Three Wishes: Magical Short Stories (1995) is a collection of seven fantasy children's stories by Megan Whalen Turner.

== Stories ==
- A Plague of Leprechaun: One sighting of a leprechaun in North Twicking, New Hampshire, brings a flood of tourists and treasure-seekers, much to the discomfort of Mag Malleaster, who runs a tavern and inn, and to Roger Otterly, a struggling artist commissioned to paint a series of pastoral scenes. Between the human influx and the leprechaun's jinxes, things go from bad to worse until Mag and Roger join unlikely forces.
- Leroy Roachbane: Balking at the tired subject matter of his African ancestry, Leroy instead fantasizes about his Swedish past and gets transported there as a hero destined to fight a plague of roaches.
- Factory: In a dystopian future where the last public park has been overrun by a factory, orphaned John takes a job as a crane worker. In the heights of the factory, he meets the ghost of a girl who lived in the house where the factory now stands, and they form a strange friendship.
- Aunt Charlotte and the NGA Portraits: Elderly Aunt Charlotte is rich but remote. Only at the end of her niece's visit does Charlotte open up with a very odd story about herself as a child, meeting the magical Olga Weathers. Olga has lost her fur coat to a bad spell and by training Charlotte with puzzles, she is able to get Charlotte to enter a painting of Venice to hunt for it.
- Instead of Three Wishes: Selene is just doing a neighbourly good deed helping a man cross the street, but the man is Mechemel, the elf prince. He offers her three wishes and is nonplussed when she refuses them: she's read all the stories of wishes gone bad. Not to be outdone, he assumes the role of boarder at her crippled mother's house and is won over by their charm and, especially, Selene's pastries.
- The Nightmare: You never know when a contagious curse of nightmares is going around. Kevin is starting junior high thinking he is going to be big man on campus, but after threatening a little old lady on the street, he begins to have the worst nightmares of all: seeing himself through the eyes of others.
- The Baker King: The peaceful island kingdom of Monevassia has been running very well for nine years without a king, but when Spiro the Unpopular threatens to take over, the royal council must make some difficult decisions: either elect a new king, find the long-lost crown prince, or be subjugated by the pretender, Spiro. One councilor thinks he finds the answer in a scheme to make an apprentice baker the king of Monevassia, at least long enough for the army to ward off Spiro. But no one's plans seem to be working out.
