= Henry Lien =

- Born: 1970 (age 55–56); Taiwan
- Education: Brown University; UCLA School of Law
- Occupation: Author
- Writing career
- Years active: 2013-present
- Genres: speculative fiction, non-fiction
- Website: henrylien.com

Henry Lien is an author of speculative fiction and non-fiction.

== Biography ==
Lien is originally from Taiwan and lives in Hollywood, California. He is a graduate of St. Paul’s School in New Hampshire, Brown University, and UCLA School of Law. In addition to being an author, he practiced law for 10 years as an attorney and has been a gallerist/art dealer. He is an instructor at UCLA Extension (which awarded him Outstanding Instructor of the Year), University of Iowa, and Clarion West.

== Literary Career ==
Lien graduated from Clarion West Writers Workshop in 2012. He is the author of the Peasprout Chen figure skating/martial arts fantasy series, published by Henry Holt and Company, which The New York Times described as “Hermione Granger meets Crouching Tiger, Hidden Dragon meets the Ice Capades meets Mean Girls.” The series received starred reviews from Publishers Weekly, Kirkus Reviews, and Booklist, as well as received several awards and nominations.

He is also the author of the non-fiction book Spring, Summer, Asteroid, Bird: The Art of Eastern Storytelling, published by W.W. Norton in 2025. Publishers Weekly described the book as "a perceptive primer on common narrative techniques in East Asian cultures... Lien offers smart commentary on a varied selection of books, films, and games, upending conventional wisdom in Western storytelling along the way." He has been invited to lecture about this book at institutions including the United States Library of Congress.

His short fiction has appeared in various publications, including Asimov's Science Fiction, Analog Science Fiction and Fact, The Magazine of Fantasy & Science Fiction, and Lady Churchill's Rosebud Wristlet.

His essays have appeared in publications including Literary Hub and Poets & Writers. In addition to his fiction, Lien has served as art director for Lightspeed Magazine and arts editor for Interfictions Online.

== Awards ==
Lien was nominated for the 2013 Nebula Award for Best Novelette for "Pearl Rehabilitative Colony for Ungrateful Daughters," which also placed second in the 2014 Asimov's Reader's Poll.

His novelette "The Ladies' Aquatic Gardening Society" was nominated for the 2015 Nebula Award for Best Novelette.

His novel Peasprout Chen, Future Legend of Skate and Sword was nominated for the 2018 Nebula Award/Andre Norton Award and won the Parents’ Choice Foundation’s Silver Medal. His novel Peasprout Chen: Battle of Champions was nominated for the 2019 Nebula Award/Andre Norton Award and won the Parents’ Choice Foundation’s Silver Medal.

== Bibliography ==
=== Novels ===
Peasprout Chen

1. Future Legend of Skate and Sword (2018)
2. Battle of Champions (2019)

=== Non-Fiction ===
1. Spring, Summer, Asteroid, Bird: The Art of Eastern Storytelling (2025)

=== Short Non-Fiction ===
1. Supplemental Declaration of Henry Lien (2016)

=== Short Fiction ===
Stories (Note: Short stories unless otherwise noted.)

Title	Year	First published	Reprinted/collected	Notes
Pearl Rehabilitative Colony for Ungrateful Daughters	2013			
The Great Leap of Shin	2015			
Bilingual	2015			
The Ladies' Aquatic Gardening Society	2015	Lien, Henry (June 2015). "The Ladies' Aquatic Gardening Society". Asimov's Science Fiction. 39 (6): 32–47.		Novelette
The Shadow You Cast Is Me	2015			
The Magic Paintbrush	2020			

———————
