= Greenglass House =

2014 novel by Kate Milford

- Author: Kate Milford
- Language: English
- Series: Greenglass House
- Publisher: HMH Books for Young Readers
- Publication date: 2014
- ISBN: 9780544540286
- Followed by: Ghosts of Greenglass House

Greenglass House is a 2014 novel by American writer Kate Milford with illustrations made by Jaime Zollars. The novel won the Edgar Allan Poe Award for Best Children's Novel, and was also nominated for the National Book Award and the Andre Norton Award. The book hit The New York Times Best Seller list.

== Plot ==
Milo Pine, the twelve-year-old adopted son of the owners of Greenglass House, an old ramshackle inn, hopes to get some rest during the Christmas holidays. He knows that no one will come to the inn during the holidays but on the very first night, one after another, five guests show up to stay at Greenglass House. Milo believes that the arrival of each of them is not accidental and is somehow connected to a nautical chart he found along with the house itself. He befriends the cook's younger daughter, Meddy Caraway and they start a role-playing game campaign to investigate the chart and learn more about the guests. They find that one of the guests has been entering occupied rooms. At first, nothing is lost, but then three guests are robbed at once.

Milo and Meddy's investigation eventually leads them to believe that De Cary Vinge, the first guest to have shown up, is a customs agent which he confirms in a story he tells. Vinge takes all of the guests and Milo's parents hostage because he wants to find the last treasure of Michael "Doc Holystone" Whitcher, a famous smuggler and owner of Greenglass House before his untimely death. Milo and Meddy manage to escape and lock themselves in the attic. Milo then realizes that "Meddy" is actually the ghost of Addie Whitcher, Holystone's daughter. She confirms this and reveals that 34 years prior, a young Vinge was chasing her father when he stumbled and fell off a cliff. Vinge then found Addie and she leaned forward to hear his speech, but also fell off a balcony and died. The two then realize where Holystone left his final treasure. After a failed attempt to sneak up on Vinge, Milo makes him a deal: he will show Vinge where the treasure is if he releases the hostages. Vinge agrees and Milo shows him a crystal chandelier that hangs in Greenglass House.

The treasure is ultimately a role-playing figurine for the game that Milo and Meddy played, Odd Trails, that Holystone had bought for her. Milo refuses to hand it over to Vinge, who pulls a gun on him. This provokes Meddy to intimidate Vinge to the point where he shoots her and runs away in terror. The hostages are released, and Milo gives Meddy the figurine; she introduces herself to the remaining guests and Milo's parents. On a closer inspection of the chandelier, it turns out that Holystone also hid a sketch for a stained-glass window of himself, which another guest takes with him to inspect at the local university.

All of the guests eventually leave, having completed their business at Greenglass House, leaving Milo with his family and Meddy. She leaves, saying that Milo should be with his family, and disappears. Milo returns home and celebrates Christmas with his parents.

== Reception ==
The book was received very positively. Betsy Bird from School Library Journal said that Greenglass House is a "great grand book for those kiddos who like reading books that make them feel smart". Also Bird said that she "loves the vocabulary at work here" citing two words: "raconteur" and "puissance".

Year	Award	Category	Result	References
2014	National Book Award	National Book Award for Fiction	Nominated	
2015	Andre Norton Award	Best Teen Sci-Fi/Fantasy Literature	Nominated	
2015	Edgar Awards	Best Children's Novel	Won	
