= The Kiss of Deception =

2014 novel written by Mary E. Pearson

- First edition (publ. Henry Holt and Co.); Cover artist: Rodrigo Adolfo
- Author: Mary E. Pearson
- Language: English
- Publisher: Henry Holt and Co.
- Publication date: 2014
- ISBN: 978-0-8050-9923-2 (first edition, hardcover)
- LC Class: PZ7.P32316 Ki

The Kiss of Deception is a 2014 young adult romantic fantasy novel written by Mary E. Pearson. The story is about princess Lia, who seeks a life outside that of royalty. This is the first novel of The Remnant Chronicles.

== Plot ==
In a traditional society, Princess Lia's life follows a preordained course. As First Daughter, she is expected to have the revered gift of sight - but she doesn't - and she knows her parents are perpetrating a sham when they arrange her marriage to secure an alliance with a neighboring kingdom - to a prince she has never met.

On the morning of her wedding, Lia flees to a distant village. She settles into a new life, hopeful when two strangers arrive. She is unaware that one is the jilted prince and the other an assassin sent to kill her.

== Reception ==
Publishers Weekly gave the book a positive review, describing it as "an extraordinary start" to the series, and praising the depiction of its heroine. Kirkus Reviews also gave it a positive review, describing it as "rich and exciting" with a bold ending, despite being "slightly uneven".
