= Star Daughter =

- Cover of the HarperTeen edition
- Author: Shveta Thakrar
- Language: English
- Publication date: 2020

Star Daughter is a 2020 young adult fantasy novel by Shveta Thakrar. It was a 2021 Andre Norton Nebula Award finalist. Star Daughter is the first book in the Night Market Triptych, followed by The Dream Runners (2022) and Divining the Leaves (2025), also published by Harper Teen.

The story centers on a sixteen year old named Sheetal Mistry, the daughter of a star and a human. Thakrar refers to influences that range from Hindu mythology and cosmology to video games like The Legend of Zelda.

== Reception ==
A review in School Library Journal praises the novel's "lyrical prose and imaginative story."

Booklist calls it a "mesmerizing nod to Neil Gaiman's Stardust."

Reactor writes, "Thakrar serves up a wonderful cast and an engrossing plot, pulling from a fascinating pantheon of mythological beings and gods."
