= The Lost (Durst novel) =

2014 novel by Sarah Beth Durst

- First edition (publ. Harlequin MIRA)
- Author: Sarah Beth Durst
- Language: English
- Publisher: Harlequin MIRA
- Publication date: 2014

The Lost is a 2014 novel by Sarah Beth Durst. It tells the story of Lauren Chase, a woman who decides to go for a long drive rather than face the results of tests her mother has had, and who ends up in the fictional town of Lost.

Actress Selma Blair bought the rights to the novel in 2018 intending to adapt it to film.

Plans for a sequel called The Missing were already in development by the time the novel was published.

== Plot ==
Lauren Chase is a young woman from California who has allowed her mother to move in with her after her struggles with cancer. After realizing that her mother's cancer might have returned Lauren gets into her car and drives all day. Caught up in a dust storm Lauren hallucinates a mysterious man with feather tattoos on his chest and winds up in the town of Lost where she is given free food and lodging. Preparing to go home the following morning she is once again caught up in the dust storm. After driving in and out of it several times she is eventually rescued by the tattooed man who turns out not to be a hallucination. Returning to Lost looking for help, Lauren is told that she will receive aid from the Missing Man. However when Lauren meets the Missing Man and tells him her name he refuses to help her or the other residents of Lost and walks away. As none of the residents can leave Lost until the Missing Man helps them, they are terrified of Lauren and shun her. After an angry mob sets upon her, Lauren is rescued by a six year old child named Claire who rescues Lauren as she is the only person she has ever seen independently walk in and out of the dust storm. Lauren is taken to the apartment of Peter, who turns out to be the man with the tattoos. Peter tells Lauren that only lost things and people end up in Lost and no one can leave without the Missing Man. Peter, who is a "finder" of the lost, decides to help Lauren as she is the only other person, aside from himself, who the Missing Man has ever refused to help.

Lauren and Claire, and eventually Peter, decide to seek shelter in one of the many abandoned houses around Lost. Claire and Peter teach her to survive by scavenging. Lauren holds out hope that she will one day be able to leave even without the Missing Man and eventually spends an entire day biking around the outskirts of Lost, looking for a weakness in the perpetual dust storm that surrounds the town. Instead she realizes there are no weaknesses, and witnesses the void toss up cars, lost objects, and a house. Returning, Peter shows Lauren some of the things that the void has left them, including the lost paintings The Storm on the Sea of Galilee and Chez Tortoni, in order to comfort her.

As the Missing Man continues to stay away from Lost, the void that borders the town begins to move closer. Lauren goes to investigate and finds Veronica, a waitress who has become crazed after her lover, Sean, was taken by the expanding void. Veronica threatens to shoot Lauren and Lauren offers to go into the void looking for Sean, knowing that Peter will try to rescue her. Lauren does not find Sean but she does find a ring. She and Sean are rescued by Peter and when Lauren shows them the ring Sean recognizes it and uses it to propose to Veronica. The two develop the glow that Lost residents obtain when they are ready for the Missing Man to send them away from Lost.

Sean and Veronica spread the news about Lauren and more Lost residents begin to show up at her door looking for help. Lauren manages to help several of them, including one resident who trades information about her own death for the location of Claire's parents, who did not in fact abandon her as she believed, but who moved to Scottsdale, Arizona after being devastated over her disappearance. Despite the fact that she is able to help people, Lauren continues to want to return to her mother. To help her Peter goes finds the Missing Man. The Missing Man eventually returns and tells Lauren that her mother is dying but she cannot yet return to her as she has yet to discover the reason she came to Lost. He also teaches Lauren to help people with the glow move on by placing her hands on them and saying "You were lost; you are found." Lauren accidentally uses this technique to send Claire back to the real world. Devastated she creates a found object art piece which gives her the glow, since what sent her to Lost was that she had abandoned her creativity and desire to make art. Peter begs Lauren to stay as the town of Lost needs her to continue sending people back to the real world. He also confesses he loves Lauren, but she sends herself back to the real world.

Lauren wakes up in a hospital where she learns that she has been in a coma for three months and was found in a car accident on the very day she left home. Her mother is also in the hospital having been diagnosed with stage 4 ovarian cancer. Lauren is convinced that Lost was a hallucination, but she continues to find objects from Lost in the real world, objects she could not have known about before. Beginning to believe Lost was real, Lauren decides to take her mother there since the people of Lost never leave and even if dead their souls remain in the town. Before she can leave with her mother however her mother's condition worsens forcing her to remain in the hospital. Lauren tells her mother about her plan to leave and Lauren's mother told her they would have never found Lost together since Lauren's mother was never lost as long as she had Lauren.

After her mother's death Lauren gets in her car and prepares to return to Lost. She first seeks out Claire. Unexpectedly, when she arrives in Scottsdale she sees that Claire has integrated happily back in real life. Lauren drives on until her car runs out of gas looking for Lost. She is about to give up hope that she will find it when she finally walks straight into the dust storm.

== Characters ==
- Lauren Chase - a young woman who can't cope with her mother's possible cancer diagnosis
- Claire - a six year old child who was abandoned by her parents
- Peter - a "finder" who helps guide lost souls from the void into Lost
- Missing Man - the only person capable of helping the residents of Lost leave
