= Mary E. Pearson =

Young-adult fiction writer

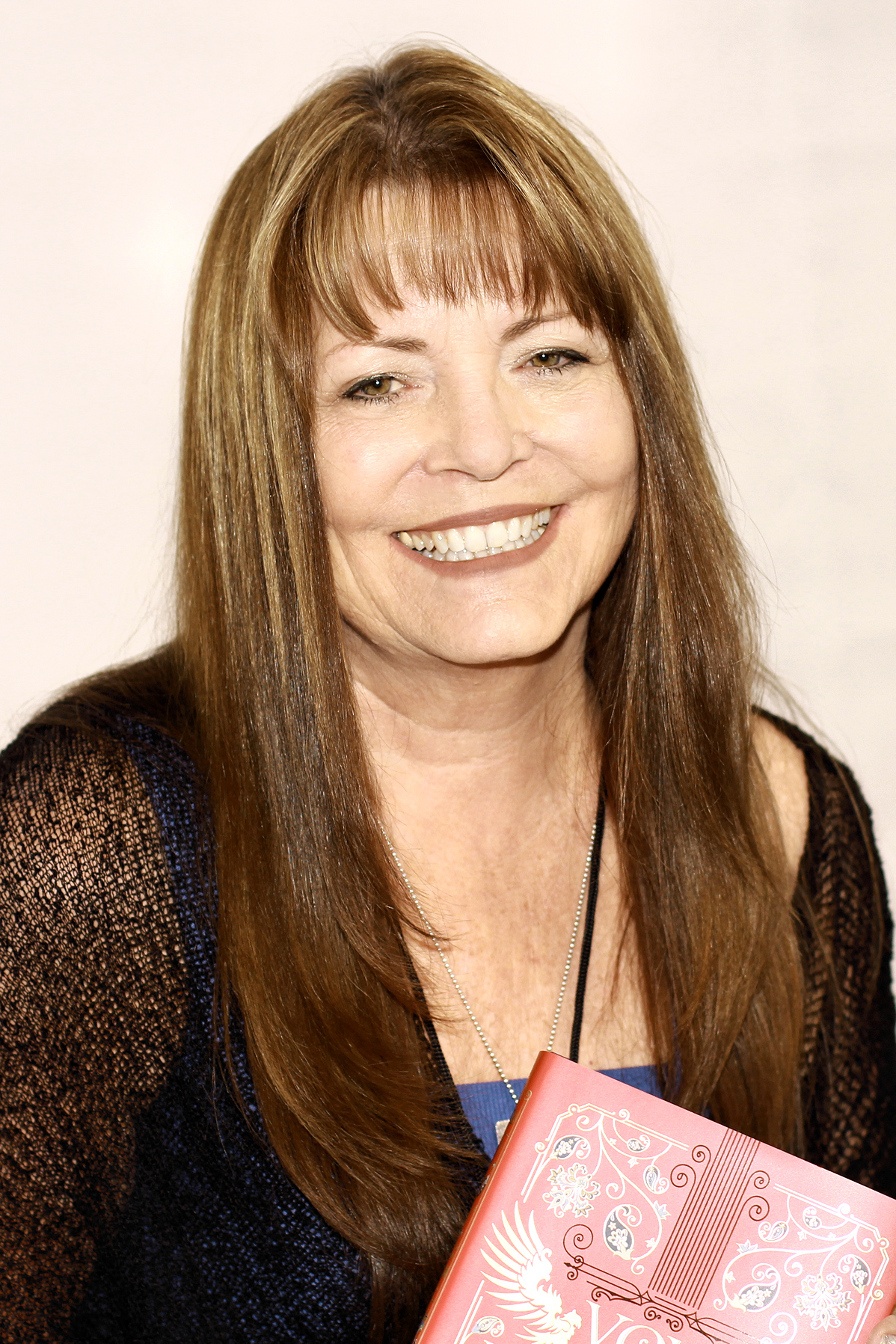
- Pearson at the 2019 Texas Book Festival
- Born: August 14, 1955 (age 71); Southern California
- Occupation: Writer
- Writing career
- Period: 1999–present
- Website: marypearson.com

Mary E. Pearson (born August 14, 1955) is an American children's writer best known for young adult fiction.

Her book A Room on Lorelei Street won the 2006 Golden Kite Award for fiction. Her book The Adoration of Jenna Fox was a finalist for the Andre Norton Award and is being adapted into a movie.

== Selected works ==
- David v. God (Houghton Mifflin Harcourt, 2000)
- Scribbler of Dreams (Harcourt Paperbacks, 2002)
- A Room on Lorelei Street (Henry Holt and Co., 2005)
- The Miles Between (Holt, 2009)

=== The Jenna Fox Chronicles ===
1. The Adoration of Jenna Fox (Holt, 2008)
2. The Fox Inheritance (Holt, 2011)
3. Fox Forever (Holt, 2013)

=== The Remnant Chronicles ===
Morrighan (prequel novella, Holt, 2016)

1. The Kiss of Deception (Holt, 2014)
2. The Heart of Betrayal (Holt, 2015)
3. The Beauty of Darkness (Holt, 2016)

=== Dance of Thieves Duology ===
Set in the same world as The Remnant Chronicles

1. Dance of Thieves (Holt, 2018)
2. Vow of Thieves (Holt, 2019)

=== The Courting of Bristol Keats Duology ===
1. The Courting of Bristol Keats (Flatiron Books, 2024)
2. The Last Wish of Bristol Keats (Flatiron Books, 2025)

=== Picture books ===
- Pickles in My Soup, illustrated by Tom Payne (New York: Children's Press, 1999)
- Where Is Max?, illustrated by Samantha L. Walker (Children's, 2000)
- Generous Me, illustrated by Gary Krejca (Children's Press, 2005)
- Fast Dan, illustrated by Eldon C. Doty (Children's Press, 2005)
- I Can Do It All, illustrated by Jeff Shelly (Children's Press, 2008)
