= The King of Attolia =

2006 young adult fantasy novel by Megan Whalen Turner

- First edition cover
- Author: Megan Whalen Turner
- Cover artist: Vince Natale
- Series: Queen's Thief
- Genre: Young-adult fantasy, political fiction
- Publisher: Greenwillow Books/ HarperCollins
- Publication date: February 2006
- Publication place: United States
- Media type: Print, audiobook
- Pages: 387
- ISBN: 0-06-083577-X
- OCLC: 57754053
- LC Class: PZ7.T85565 Ki 2006
- Preceded by: The Queen of Attolia
- Followed by: A Conspiracy of Kings

The King of Attolia is a young adult fantasy novel by Megan Whalen Turner, published by the Greenwillow Books imprint of HarperCollins in 2006. It is the third novel in The Queen's Thief series, which Turner began with The Thief in 1996.

== Setting ==
The books are set in an imaginary, Byzantine-like landscape reminiscent of ancient Greece and other territories around the Mediterranean. The action takes place in the countries of Eddis, Attolia and Sounis. The characters' names are Greek, and references are made to actual Greek authors. The pantheon of gods, ruled by the Great Goddess Hephestia, is unique to the author. Additionally, the world includes items such as guns and pocket watches.

== Plot ==
Eugenides is a former Thief of Eddis who loses his hand but marries the Queen of Attolia, uniting the two previously warring countries and bringing peace to his kingdom. He then assumes the role of king. He appears to sleep during important briefings, makes casual remarks, wears unusual clothing, and refuses to be more than a figurehead, allowing the Queen to continue ruling as she has always done. The Attolian court views him as a young foreigner who seems ineffectual and foolish.

The narrative is largely from the perspective of Costis, a young soldier in the Queen's Guard. After the king insults Teleus, Captain of the Guard, Costis reacts impulsively and knocks the king down. Expecting to be executed, he is surprised when the king spares his life and makes him a reluctant confidant. Initially finding the king obnoxious and conniving, Costis gradually develops sympathy for him, recognizing him as a young man far from his home in Eddis, married to the formidable Queen.

The plot involves an assassination attempt and various political intrigues. Central to these are the traitorous Baron Erondites and his sons, Relius, the Queen’s master of spies, and Nahuseresh, Eugenides's old enemy from the (fictionalized) Mede Empire. Costis discovers there is more to the king than meets the eye and gains a deeper understanding of his abilities, motives, and relationship with the Queen. Costis's own life and reputation become jeopardized, and the fate of three nations depends on Eugenides's internal struggles as he contemplates accepting his destiny as the King of Attolia.

== Reviews ==
The King of Attolia received starred reviews from School Library Journal, The Horn Book, Kirkus Reviews, and Library Media Connection, along with positive reviews from other sources. It was recognized as a School Library Journal Best Book, an ALA Top 10 Best Book for Young Adults, and was included on the Horn Book Fanfare list, the New York Public Library Books for the Teen Age list, and the Dorothy Canfield Fisher Children's Book Award Masterlist.

== Queen's Thief series ==
- 1996 The Thief
- 2000 The Queen of Attolia
- 2006 The King of Attolia
- 2010 A Conspiracy of Kings
- 2017 Thick as Thieves
- 2020 Return of the Thief
