= Carlos Hernandez (writer) =

American writer (born 1971)

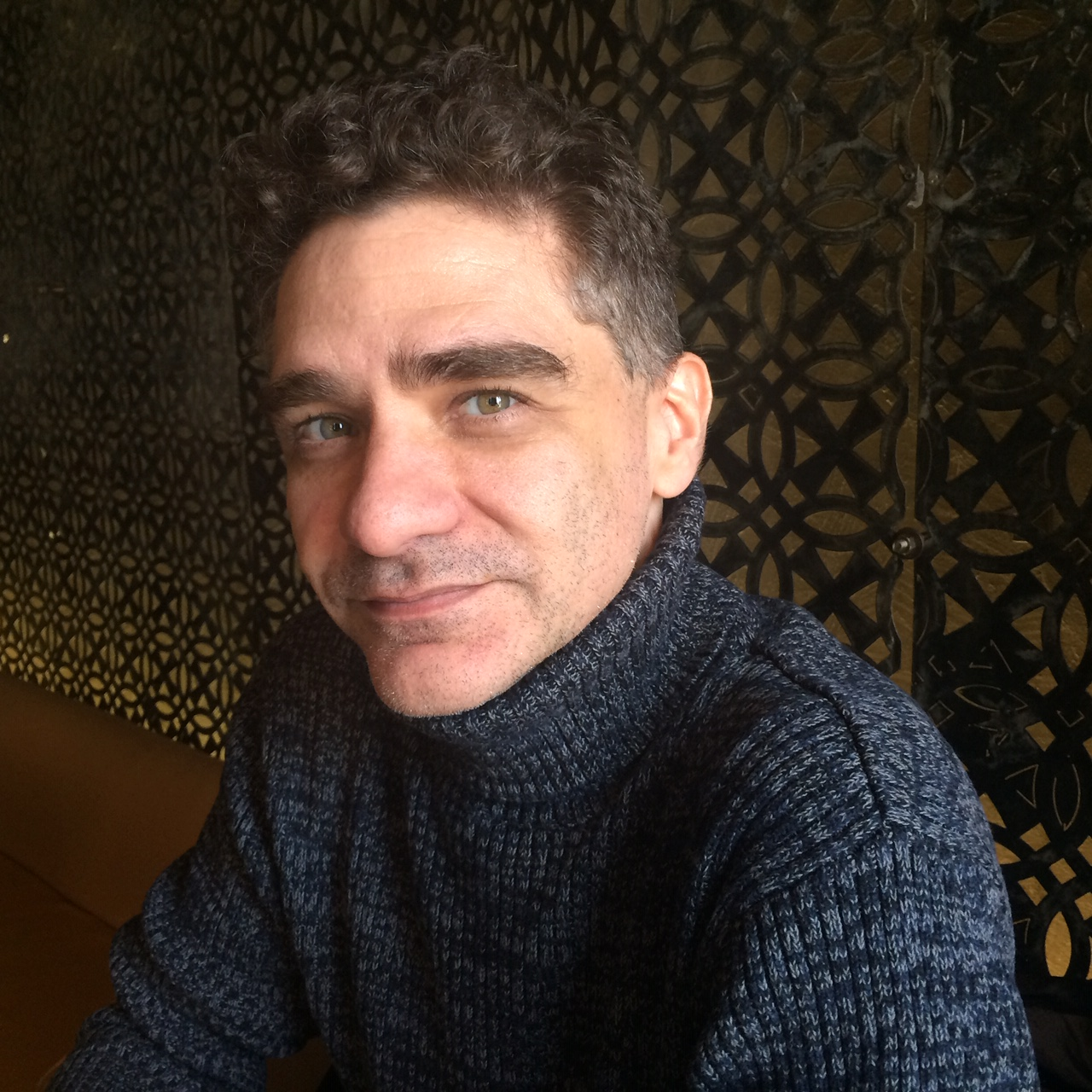
- Born: January 14, 1971 (age 55)
- Education: Binghamton University
- Occupation: Writer
- Spouse: C. S. E. Cooney
- Writing career
- Genres: Science fiction and fantasy
- Notable work: Sal and Gabi Break the Universe
- Notable awards: Pura Belpré Award (2020)

Carlos Alberto Pablo Hernandez (born January 14, 1971) is an American writer of science fiction and fantasy. He is best known for the middle grade novels Sal and Gabi Break the Universe, which won the 2020 Pura Belpré Award, and its sequel, Sal and Gabi Fix the Universe.

== Career ==
Hernandez earned his Ph.D. in English, with an emphasis in creative writing, from Binghamton University in 2000. He is an English professor at the University of New York in the Borough of Manhattan Community College campus. He also teaches in the Interactive Technology and Pedagogy Program at the CUNY Graduate Center.

Hernandez's interest in game-based learning led him to co-found the CUNY Games Network and the Board Game Designers Group of New York. He has been a lead writer and a game designer on Meriwether, a computer role-playing game charting the voyage of the Lewis and Clark Expedition, released in 2017 and a literary curator on the 2020 Apple Arcade game Dear Reader, a word- and literature-identification game. He is currently finalizing Negocios Infernales, a tabletop role-playing game that he co-created with C. S. E. Cooney, for Outland Entertainment.

== Personal life ==
Hernandez lives in Queens, New York, with his wife, the World Fantasy Award author C. S. E. Cooney.

== Sal and Gabi series ==
The Sal and Gabi novels are works of middle grade fiction that mix Cuban traditions and beliefs with science fiction. The books follow the adventures of Sal Vidón and his best friend Gabi Reál as they handle the consequences of Sal's ability to open portals to alternative universes, all the while attending Miami's premier magnet school, Culeco Academy of the Arts.

The first Sal and Gabi novel was described by Kirkus Reviews as "a breath of fresh air" while Publishers Weekly gave both novels starred reviews, applauding Break the Universe's "nonstop sense of wonder [that] accompanies a genuinely heartwarming and humorous tone" and concluding that "Sal and Gabi are clearly a fictional team destined for greatness".

In 2021, Eva Longoria's production company UnbeliEVAble Entertainment was developing a television adaptation of the first novel with Disney Branded Television.

== The Assimilated Cuban's Guide to Quantum Santeria ==
A collection of twelve speculative short stories that, in the words of a reviewer for the LA Review of Books, "defies categorization by bringing together elements of Latina/o and speculative writing in a masterful mashup of science, magic, and cultural belief".

This short story collection combines elements of science fiction, magical realism and fantasy to artfully portray the experience of straddling the liminal space between white U.S. culture and "Latinidad". The "assimilated" Latinx characters in the collection are searching for lost cultural connections; whether it is a revival of indigenous practices or a lost family member, Hernandez uses fantastic situations to explore the difficult topics of immigration and assimilation in a way that is humorous and endearing. As Joy Sanchez-Taylor notes in Diverse Futures: Science Fiction and Authors of Color (2021), the title story, which shares the same name as the title of the collection, highlights the tension between the indigenous practice of Santeria and Catholicism "to demonstrate the limitations of Western cultures reliance on 'rational' thought and the Western scientific method".

The stories included "Aphotic Ghost," "Homeostasis," "Entanglements," "International Studbook of the Giant Panda," "Macrobe Conservation Project," "Los Simpáticos," "More Than Pigs and Rosaries Can Give," "Bone of My Bone," "Magical Properties of Unicorn Ivory," "American Moat," "Fantaisie Impromptu no.4 in C#min, op.66" and "Assimilated Cuban's Guide to Quantum Santeria".

== Awards and honors ==
Awards for Hernandez's books
Year	Title	Award		Result	Ref.
2017	The Assimilated Cuban's Guide to Quantum Santeria	Locus Award	Collection	17th	
2020	Sal and Gabi Break the Universe	ALSC Notable Children's Books	—	Selection	
2020	Sal and Gabi Break the Universe	Ignyte	Middle Grde	Shortlisted	
2020	Sal and Gabi Break the Universe	Nebula Award	Andre Norton Award	Shortlisted	
2020	Sal and Gabi Break the Universe	Mythopoeic Award	Children's Literature	Shortlisted	
2020	Sal and Gabi Break the Universe	Pura Belpré Award	—	Won	
2021	Sal and Gabi Fix the Universe	Mythopoeic Award	Children's Literature	Shortlisted	

== Publications ==
=== The Sal and Gabi Series ===
- Sal and Gabi Break the Universe. Disney Hyperion, 2019. ISBN 978-1368022828
- Sal and Gabi Fix the Universe. Disney Hyperion, 2020. ISBN 978-1368023610

=== Novels ===
- Abecedarium: A Novel in Ten Stories. Co-authored with Davis Schneiderman. Chiasmus Media, 2007. ISBN 978-0978549985

=== Short story collection ===
- The Assimilated Cuban's Guide to Quantum Santeria. Rosarium Publishing, 2016. ISBN 978-1495607394
