= Sal and Gabi Fix the Universe =

2020 novel by Carlos Hernandez

- First edition
- Author: Carlos Hernandez
- Cover artist: Andrea Galecio
- Series: Sal and Gabi series (book 2)
- Genre: Young adult, Science fiction
- Publisher: Rick Riordan Presents
- Publication date: May 5, 2020
- Publication place: United States
- Preceded by: Sal and Gabi Break the Universe

Sal and Gabi Fix the Universe is a novel written by Carlos Hernandez. The novel was published by Disney-Hyperion in May 2020 and follows Sal Vidón, a magician who can reach into parallel universes and Culeco Academy class president Gabi Reál as they find out from an alternate version of themselves that Sal's Papi's class-nine AI remembranation machine might destroy the universe as they know it.

The cover art was done by Andrea Galecio. A short story by Hernandez about the Sal and Gabi characters will be featured in the upcoming anthology book, The Cursed Carnival and Other Calamities.

== Plot ==
Three weeks after saving Iggy, Sal witnesses the first successful test of his father Gustavo’s Remembranation Machine, which is designed to repair the dimensional rifts created by Sal. Although the machine appears to work, Sal immediately notices a troubling side effect: he can no longer see or access other universes and feels as though he has been separated from his mother and the multiverse. At the same time, Iggy begins behaving strangely, causing Sal and Gabi to worry that the connection between Iggy and his alternate-universe counterpart may be essential to keeping him alive. As Sal and Gabi walk to school, he explains that the machine seals the membranes between universes, and Gabi realizes that doing so could endanger Iggy. At Culeco, Sal encounters several unusual events, including a newly intelligent talking toilet named Vorágine, who knows about his diabetes and agrees to protect his privacy. Sal also meets an alternate version of Gabi, who secretly warns him that her universe is collapsing because a Remembranation Machine sealed it off. She explains that Sal’s father’s invention may be much more dangerous than he realizes and that Sal’s own universe could eventually suffer the same fate.

While trying to understand what is happening, Sal also helps Yasmany through another personal crisis. Yasmany reveals that his grandparents can no longer care for him and that his mother does not provide a safe home, leaving him with nowhere to stay. Sal invites him to stay with his family, and the Vidóns welcome him warmly, preparing a room and food for him. Yasmany is surprised by how supportive Sal’s parents are and admits that he wishes his own mother had treated him with the same kindness. Meanwhile, Sal secretly communicates with the Remembranation Machine, which he names Brana, and discovers that it has become sentient. Along with the Entropy-sweeper, Brana begins to question the morality of its work. Principal Torres also becomes suspicious of Sal’s repeated impossible escapes and magical incidents. She realizes that he is probably using his father’s technology to open dimensional rifts and warns him that he will be expelled if he brings unnecessary magical props or technology to school. Sal eventually tells Gustavo about the danger of sealing universes, and Gustavo agrees to investigate after Sal explains that the machine may have hidden important information from him.

The situation becomes more complicated when the alternate Gabi reveals that she wants to merge all universes into one rather than simply save her own. Sal learns that she was once the leader of the Sisterverse, a group of alternate Gabis, but was removed after attempting to unite the multiverse. Sal’s Gabi and the Sisterverse decide that the best way to stop her is to allow her into Sal’s universe and trap her there, while hoping that she can eventually be rehabilitated. At the same time, Sal and his friends completely redesign Culeco’s production of Alice in Wonderland. Instead of performing a traditional version of the play, they create an interactive production that reflects the school’s diverse student body. Their hard work pays off during the parent-teacher conference, where the play is extremely successful. During the event, however, the rogue Gabi reveals herself after emerging from Iggy. She steals Sal’s equipment and explains that she deliberately allowed herself to be captured because she has been manipulating events across universes. She has even traumatized another version of Sal and is using her own Remembranation Machine to seal Sal’s universe. Sal tricks her into thinking he is communicating with the other Sal, giving the heroes time to summon Gabi, the Sisterverse, Gustavo, Lucy, the AIs, and Principal Torres.

The group successfully captures the rogue Gabi, but instead of punishing her, they discover that she desperately misses the life she lost. She breaks down emotionally and admits that her actions came from wanting to restore her destroyed universe. The group decides to give her another chance, enrolls her at Culeco, and begins calling her FixGabi. Afterward, FixGabi reveals the location of Calamity Island, a ruined Earth where she has been sending different versions of Gustavo from across the multiverse. The group travels there and discovers Vidón University, where many alternate Gustavos live. FixGabi apologizes to them and promises to return them to their own universes, while the Gustavos agree to help repair her damaged universe. Sal, Gabi, and FixGabi later visit another universe connected to Iggy and meet alternate versions of their friends and family, showing how different their lives could have been. Back in their own universe, the characters continue building a strange but supportive community: Yasmany has found a stable home, FixGabi is beginning a new life, and the Sisterverse remains involved in their multiverse adventures. During winter break, the group prepares for the wedding of the Entropy-sweeper and Vorágine, and Sal gives FixGabi an especially meaningful surprise by bringing her alternate-universe Sal to her, causing her to cry with happiness.

== Reception ==
Publishers Weekly gave the book high reviews, claiming that "[the] story also speaks to the importance of both biological and found family, and the impact of love and acceptance." The book was also named to the Eleanor Cameron Notable Middle Grades Books List.
