= Ice (Durst novel) =

2009 novel by Sarah Beth Durst

- First edition
- Author: Sarah Beth Durst
- Cover artist: Cliff Nielsen
- Language: English
- Genre: Fantasy/Romance
- Publisher: Margaret K. McElderry
- Publication date: October 6, 2009
- Publication place: United States
- Pages: 320
- ISBN: 978-1-4169-8643-0
- OCLC: 310397053
- LC Class: PZ8.D972Ice 2009

Ice is a novel written by Sarah Beth Durst, a modernized retelling of the Norwegian fairy tale East of the Sun and West of the Moon. It was a nominee for the Andre Norton Award in 2009.

== Plot ==
When she was a child, Cassie's grandmother told her a story about her missing mother: she was taken by North Wind to be his daughter and then to be the bride of a polar bear king. The North Wind's daughter fell in love with Cassie's father and struck a bargain with the polar bear king for her own daughter to become bear's wife. The bear agreed and concealed the woman and her husband. When the North Wind found his daughter, she begged him to take her instead her husband and child and the North Wind blew her far away, where she was captured by trolls. Cassie eventually dismissed the story as a fairy tale to explain her mother's death.

Raised by her father at the Eastern Beaufort Research Station in Alaska, Cassie aspires to become an arctic researcher. On her eighteenth birthday, she spots a large polar bear on the ice and fails to capture him when he disappears. The incident unsettles her father, who inexplicably insists that she must immediately live with her grandmother in Fairbanks. Cassie refuses and tries again to capture the bear, who finds her to claim as his bride. Shocked by the bear's supernatural nature, she agrees to marry him on the condition that he save her mother from the trolls.

The polar bear (called "Bear") takes Cassie to an elaborate castle of ice, where she learns that he is a "munaqsri", a transporter of souls required to maintain the balance of life in nature; Bear is responsible for the souls of polar bears. Taking human form at night, Bear reveals that as his wife, she is to bear him children to become munaqsri. She refuses and Bear honours her wishes, while they still share the same bed at night. Angered that her father lied to her and failed to rescue her mother, Cassie stays at the castle, where she and Bear become close.

As a munaqsri, Bear frequently leaves Cassie behind to distribute souls to newborn polar bear cubs. Seeing her restlessness, he allows her to visit the research station. Cassie finally meets her mother, Gail, who has been deeply traumatized from her years with the trolls. Despite her father's wishes, Cassie returns with Bear along with data obtained at the research station to allow him to anticipate the births of polar bears and Cassie is allowed to accompany him during his outings. Soon afterward, Cassie learns that she is pregnant despite using birth control pills during their wedding night because Bear has used his magic to nullify the effects of the pill. Feeling betrayed, Cassie waits until evening before turning on her flashlight and seeing his face and human form. Because Cassie was forbidden to see his face as part of a bargain to free Gail, Bear must now submit to marrying the princess of the trolls.

Determined to find Bear, Cassie struggles for several weeks in the open ice, though she is protected by a herd of polar bears. In desperation, she contacts other munaqsri to find her husband. Learning that Cassie is pregnant with a munaqsri child, she is taken to the munaqsri Father Forest, who has been entrusted to care for her until her baby is born, as the munaqsri all believe the child's health takes precedence and Bear is to be left for dead. Cassie manages to escape after several months with Father Forest, but ends up falling from a cliff. Found by Jamie Ieuk, a human munaqsri, as she and her baby are dying, he agrees to heal her when she alludes to a large number of souls for him to collect. Recalling her mother is the daughter of the North Wind, she summons the South and East Winds to take her to her grandfather. Feeling guilty over Gail's fate, the North Wind blows her to the land of trolls.

Upon meeting the troll princess, Cassie is allowed to reunite with Bear on the condition that she persuades him to make the troll princess a baby - which Bear refused because the trolls have no physical form to create a baby from. Forced to choose between her husband and child, Cassie realizes the difficulty of her father's decision and is forced from trolls' castle as her child is about to be born. Jamie arrives to aid the birth, but reveals that he has no available soul for the baby. Cassie realizes the trolls are actually lost uncollected souls who wish to be born and has Jamie collect the troll princess as the baby's new soul. With Bear's bargain to the trolls fulfilled, Cassie arranges for Jamie and other munaqsri to collect the spirits of the trolls to redistribute while she and Bear return home with their newborn daughter.

== Characters ==
- Cassandra Dasent

The protagonist of the novel, Cassie has grown up at an Arctic research station, believing that her grandmother's story about her mother's disappearance had been a way a pleasant way to explain her mother's death. As a young woman, she discovers the story was true. Cassie had her birthday then died and lived her life as soulf from then on.

- Bear

The polar bear king; who had been promised a bride by the North Wind, who abducted a young woman to be his daughter and to marry the polar bear king. However, the North Wind's daughter, Gail, promised her own daughter to the polar bear king if he allowed her to marry a man she had fallen in love with. When Gail's daughter comes of age, the bear seeks her out to become his bride.

- Gail

Abigail, known also as Gail, is Cassie's mother, the adopted daughter of the North Wind. After Cassie was born, the North Wind blew her away to where the trolls lived, and she was kept there for eighteen years and has been deeply traumatized by the experience. Aside from their green eyes, she and Cassie do not resemble one another. Upon finally meeting her mother, Cassie feels her mother is a stranger to her and is disappointed by their lack of shared interests.

- Laszlo Dasent

Cassie's father. Laszlo had known about the past of his wife Gail, but he did not go after his wife because he needed to care for Cassie. He was opposed to telling Cassie about the supernatural circumstances of Gail's disappearance in order to protect Cassie. When Cassie returns from the ice castle, he attempts to move Cassie away from the research station but Cassie defiantly leaves with Bear.

- Ingrid Dasent

Laszlo's mother and grandmother of Cassie, she lives in Fairbanks. She told Cassie the story of what happened to Gail until Laszlo opposed it to protect his daughter. She cared for Cassie during her childhood.

- Father Forest

Encountered during her journey to find Bear, Cassie initially considers him an ally but soon sees him as an enemy when he reveals his intention to keep her in his home until she gives birth. She eventually escapes him.

- Jamison "Jamie" Ieuk

An Inuk man and a munaqsri for humans. Cassie meets him when she falls and harms herself. Only by convincing him that there are over 25,000 souls that don't have a body, Jamie spares her from dying.

== See also ==
- East by Edith Pattou
