= Sarah Beth Durst =

American novelist

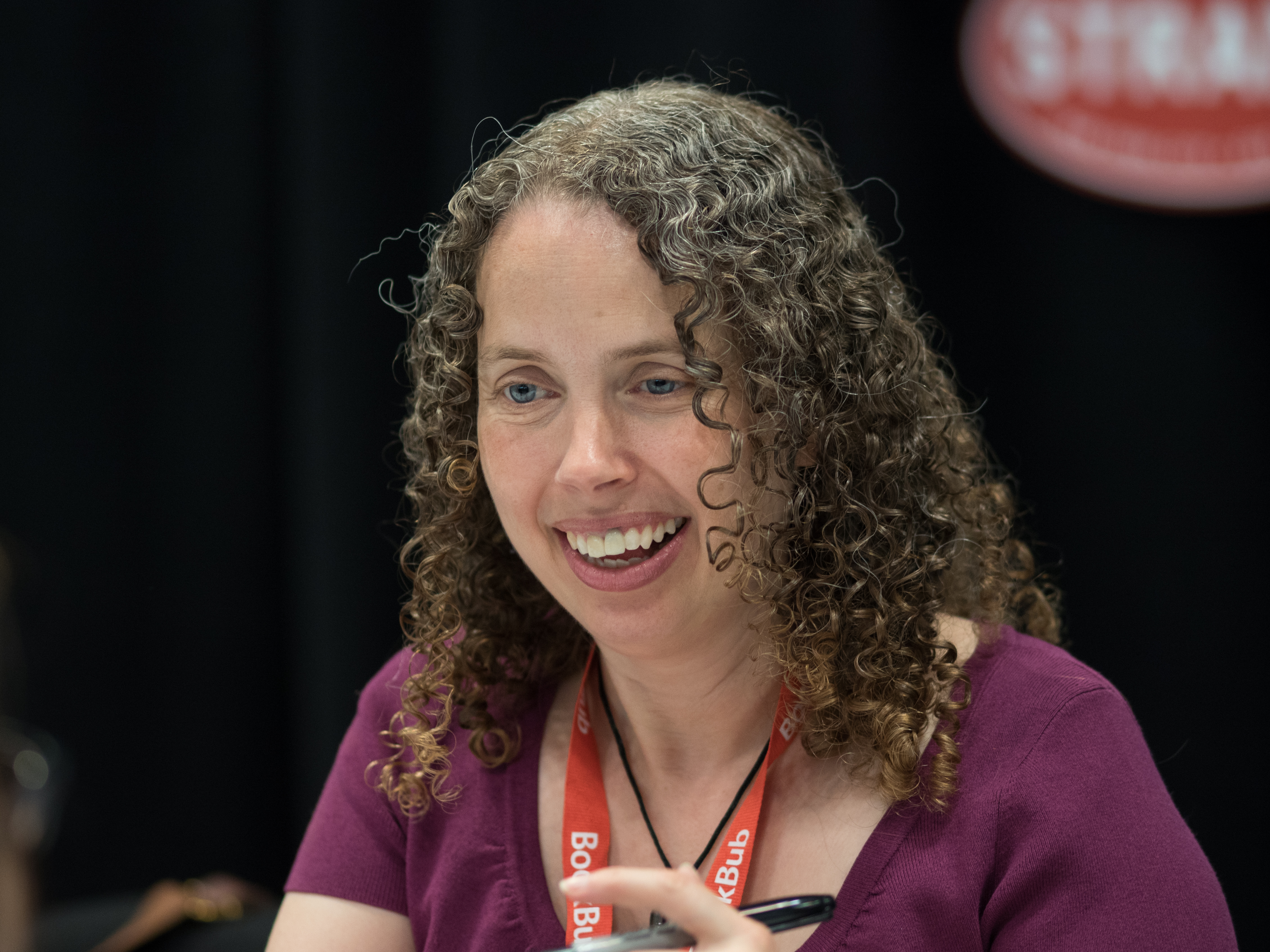
- Born: May 23, 1974 (age 52); Northborough, Massachusetts, U.S.
- Education: Princeton University
- Occupation: Novelist
- Writing career
- Genres: Science fiction and fantasy

Sarah Beth Durst (born May 23, 1974) is an American author of over 30 works of fantasy. Her 2016 novel The Queen of Blood won a 2017 Alex Award from the American Library Association. Two of her novels (The Spellshop in 2024 and The Enchanted Greenhouse in 2025) appeared on the New York Times Bestseller List. Durst writes for adults, young adults, and middle grade level readers.

== Career ==
Sarah Beth Durst, born Sarah Beth Angelini, grew up in Northborough, Massachusetts. As a child, she attended Lincoln Street Elementary School in Northborough. She later attended Bancroft School in Worcester, from which she graduated in 1992. While still in high school, she wrote a musical about intersections between fairy tales and the real world, which she has described as "horrible." She would later return to these themes in her debut novel, Into the Wild. After finishing high school, Durst attended Princeton University, which serves as the setting for her fourth novel, Enchanted Ivy. At Princeton, Durst majored in English literature and completed a concentration in theater and dance. After graduating from Princeton in 1996, Durst lived briefly in the UK before returning to Massachusetts for several years. Durst currently resides in Stony Brook, New York.

In 2007, Durst published her first novel, Into the Wild, for young adults. Into the Wild and its 2008 sequel, Out of the Wild, draw on fairy tale characters living in the real world to explore questions of free will. The Wild is an amoral force that seeks to organize people into stories with no concern for the effects these rearrangements have on individuals' lives. Landmarks from Central Massachusetts, where Durst grew up, feature in both novels; these include the Higgins Armory and Bancroft Tower. Into the Wild was a finalist for the Andre Norton Award for Young Adult Science Fiction and Fantasy, the first of multiple nominations for the Andre Norton Award that Durst's work has received.

Durst returned to the theme of fairy tales in 2009 with Ice, a modern retelling of the fairy tale East of the Sun, West of the Moon. In Durst's version, the protagonist is an aspiring arctic researcher in Alaska who encounters and marries a polar bear munaqsri, or transporter of souls. With Ice, Durst became a finalist for an Andre Norton Award for a second time.

Ice was followed by Enchanted Ivy in 2010, set at Princeton University, where Durst studied as an undergrad. In 2011 Durst published Drink, Slay, Love, a young adult novel about vampires. Its title is a parody of Eat, Pray, Love, a bestselling memoir by Elizabeth Gilbert, and reflects the tongue-in-cheek humor of the novel. Drink, Slay, Love was made into a Lifetime movie directed by Vanessa Parise and produced by Bella Thorne. Pearl, the novel's sixteen-year-old vampire protagonist, is played by Cierra Ramirez. The film aired in September 2017.

Durst won her first writing award for Vessel, published in 2012. Vessel won a Mythopoeic Fantasy Award for Children's Literature and was a finalist for an Andre Norton Award. Durst followed Vessel with the young adult novel Conjured in 2013, which was a finalist for a Mythopoeic Fantasy Award.

In 2014 Durst published The Lost, her first novel for adults. That same year, Durst also published the young adult novel Chasing Power, for the first time publishing not one novel, but two in a year.

The subsequent year Durst published The Girl Who Could Not Dream, written for middle grade readers and a finalist for a Mythopoeic Fantasy Award.

In 2016, Durst published her second novel for adults, an epic fantasy entitled The Queen of Blood. The first in Durst's Queens of Renthia series, The Queen of Blood won an ALA Alex Award. Durst has stated that The Queen of Blood was inspired in part by a mishap she experienced at a writer's retreat in the Poconos. The novel's cover was designed by illustrator Stephan Martiniere.

In 2024, Durst had a breakthrough success with The Spellshop, which was considered a leading example of the new subgenre of "cozy fantasy"; it spent six weeks on The New York Times Best Seller List and multiple weeks on other bestseller lists. In 2025 her The Enchanted Greenhouse, set in the same world, debuted at #2 on The New York Times Best Seller List.

== Bibliography ==
=== Adult fiction ===
Queens of Renthia

- The Queen of Blood (2016)
- The Reluctant Queen (2017)
- The Queen of Sorrow (2018)
- The Deepest Blue (2019) (Renthia standalone)

The Spellshop

- The Spellshop (2024)
- The Enchanted Greenhouse (2025)
- Sea of Charms (2026)
- The Magical Cheese Emporium (expected 2027)

Others

- The Lost (2014)
- Race the Sands (2020)
- The Bone Maker (2021)
- The Lies Among Us (2024)
- The Warbler (2025)

=== Young adult ===
- Ice (2009)
- Enchanted Ivy (2010)
- Drink, Slay, Love (2011)
- Vessel (2012)
- Conjured (2013)
- Chasing Power (2014)
- Fire and Heist (2018)
- The Lake House (2023)
- The Faraway Inn (2026)

=== Middle Grade ===
- The Girl Who Could Not Dream (2015)
- Journey Across the Hidden Islands (2017)
- The Stone Girl's Story (2018)
- Spark (2019)
- Catalyst (2020)
- Even and Odd (2021)
- The Shelterlings (2022)
- Spy Ring (2024)

The Wild

- Into the Wild (2007)
- Out of the Wild (2008)

=== Picture Book ===
- Roar and Sparkes Go to School (2017)

=== Short stories ===
- "The Hedgewitch" in Unfettered II: New Tales by Masters of Fantasy (2016)

== Awards and nominations ==
- The Queen of Blood (2016)
  - 2017: Won the ALA Alex Award
- The Girl Who Could Not Dream (2015)
  - 2016: Finalist for Mythopoeic Fantasy Award for Children's Literature
- Conjured (2013)
  - 2014: Finalist for Mythopoeic Fantasy Award for Children's Literature
- Vessel (2012)
  - 2013: Won the Mythopoeic Fantasy Award for Children's Literature
  - 2012: Finalist for Andre Norton Award for Young Adult Science Fiction and Fantasy
- Ice (2009)
  - 2009: Finalist for Andre Norton Award for Young Adult Science Fiction and Fantasy
- Into the Wild (2007)
  - 2007: Finalist for Andre Norton Award for Young Adult Science Fiction and Fantasy

== Personal life ==
Durst lives with her husband and two children, and a cat named Gwen in Stony Brook, New York.
