= C. S. E. Cooney =

American writer of fantasy literature

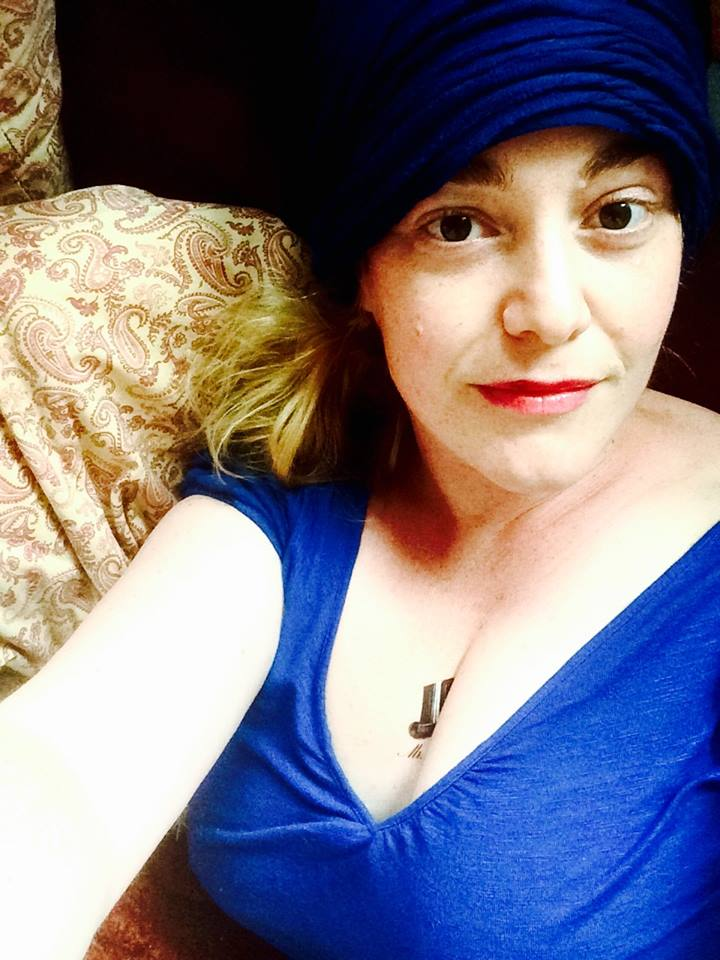
C. S. E. Cooney in 2015

Claire Suzanne Elizabeth Cooney (born 12 December 1981) is an American writer of fantasy literature. She is best known for her fantasy poetry and short stories and has won the Rhysling Award for her poem "The Sea King's Second Bride" in 2011 and the World Fantasy Award—Collection for her collection Bone Swans in 2016. In 2023 she received the World Fantasy Award for her novel Saint Death's Daughter.

== Biography ==
Cooney grew up in Phoenix, Arizona, before leaving after 20 years, lived in Chicago for 10 years, lived in Rhode Island for five years, and then moved to Queens, New York, to live with her husband: author, professor, and game designer, Carlos Hernandez. During her time in Chicago, she attended Columbia College, where she received her degree in fiction writing with a minor in theater.

In addition to writing, she is a poet, a musician, an actor, and audiobook narrator.

== Awards and honors ==
In 2022, Kirkus Reviews named Saint Death's Daughter one of the best science fiction and fantasy books of the year.

Year	Title	Award	Category	Result	Ref.
2011	The Sea King's Second Bride	Rhysling Award	Long Poem	Won	
2016	Bone Swans: Stories	World Fantasy Award	Collection	Won	
2017	Clockwork Phoenix 5	World Fantasy Award	Anthology	Shortlisted	
2018	Sword and Sonnet	Aurealis Award	Anthology	Shortlisted	
2019	Sword and Sonnet	Ditmar Award	—	Shortlisted	
2019	Sword and Sonnet	World Fantasy Award	Anthology	Shortlisted	
2020	The Best of Uncanny	Locus Award	Anthology	Nominated	
2020	Desdemona and the Deep	Locus Award	Novella	Nominated	
2021	The Book of Dragons	Locus Award	Anthology	Won	
2021	The Book of Dragons	World Fantasy Award	Anthology	Shortlisted	
2023	Saint Death's Daughter	World Fantasy Award	Novel	Won	

== Works ==
=== Novels ===
- —— (2020). The Twice-Drowned Saint. In A Sinister Quartet, ed. Mike Allen. Dark Moon Books. ISBN 9781732644038.
- —— (2022). Saint Death's Daughter. Solaris. ISBN 9781786184702.
- —— (2025). Saint Death's Herald. Solaris. ISBN 9781837864492.

=== Novellas ===
- —— (2010). The Big Bah-Ha. Kettlefish Press. ISBN 9780979808111.
- —— (2019). Desdemona and the Deep. Tor Books. ISBN 9781250229830.

=== Collections ===
- —— (2011). Jack o' the Hills. Fox Spirit. ISBN 9781907881060.
- —— (2012). How to Flirt in Faerieland & Other Wild Rhymes. Fox Spirit. ISBN 9781907881145.
- —— (2015). Bone Swans. Mythic Delirium Books. ISBN 9780988912441.
- —— (2020). The Witch in the Almond Tree and Other Stories. Kettlefish Press. ASIN B08LSLDW81.
- —— (2022). Dark Breakers. Dark Moon Books. ISBN 9781732644045.
- —— (2024). Infernal Bargains: Stories and Poems from the Deck of Destiny. Outland Entertainment. ISBN 9781954255937.

=== Series ===
==== Dark Breakers ====
- The Breaker Queen (Oct 2014)
- The Two Paupers (Jan 2015)
- Desdemona and the Deep (July 2019)
- "Salissay's Laundries" (February 2022)
- "Longergreen" (February 2022)
- "Susurra to the Moon" (February 2022)

==== The Witch's Garden ====
- The Witch in the Almond Tree (July 2014)
- Witch, Beast, Saint: An Erotic Fairy Tale (July 2014)

=== Short fiction ===
- "Lorelei's Little Deaths" from Book of Dead Things (2007)
- "Stone Shoes" in Subterranean Online, Summer (2007)
- "My Body Your Banquet" from Hell in the Heartland (2007)
- "Three Fancies from the Infernal Garden" from Subterranean Online, Winter (2009)
- "Braiding the Ghosts" from Clockwork Phoenix 3: New Tales of Beauty and Strangeness (2010)
- "Household Spirits" in Strange Horizons (2010)
- "Pale, and from a Sea-Wave Rising" in Apex Magazine (2010)
- "The Last Sophia" in Strange Horizons (2011)
- "The Canary of Candletown" from Steam-Powered II: More Lesbian Steampunk Stories (2011)
- "Zing Zou Zou" from Toasted Cake, #24 (2012)
- "Godmother Lizard" in Black Gate Magazine (2012)
- "Life on the Sun" in Black Gate Magazine (2012); reprinted in Bone Swans
- "How the Milkmaid Struck a Bargain with the Crooked One" from Giganotosaurus (2013)
- "Martyr's Gem" from Giganotosaurus (2013)
- "Ten Cigars" in Strange Horizons (2013)
- "The Bone Swans of Amandale" from Bone Swans (2015); reprinted in The Year's Best Science Fiction & Fantasy Novellas (2016)
- "The Book of May" (with Carlos Hernandez) from Clockwork Phoenix 5 (2016)
- "Though She Be But Little" in Uncanny Magazine (2017)
- "Lily-White & The Thief of Lesser Night" from Mad Hatters and March Hares (Dec 2017)
- "As for Peace, Call it Murder" from Sword and Sonnet (September 2018)
- "Or Perhaps Up" from Where the Veil is Thin (2020)
- "A Minnow, or Perhaps a Colossal Squid" with Carlos Hernandez, from Mermaids Monthly (April 2021)
- "From the Archives of the Museum of Eerie Skins: An Account" in Uncanny Magazine (July 2021)
- "Snowed In" with Carlos Hernandez, from The Bridge to Elsewhere, ed. Julia Rios and Alana Joli Abbott (2022)

=== Poems ===
- Sunday Ramble (2008)
- Cody Coyote (2009)
- Coyote Does Chicago (2009)
- Goblin Girls (2009)
- Ere One Can Say It Lightens (2010)
- She Who Rules the Bitter Reaches (2010)
- The Sea King's Second Bride (2010)
- Dogstar Men (2010)
- Postcards from Mars (2011)
- Sleeping Furies (2012)
- What Is Owed (2013)
- Voyage to a Distant Star (2013)
- Threnody (2013)
- Little Sally and the Bull Fiddle God (2014)
- Deep Bitch (2015)
- The Saga of Captain Jens (2015)
- Toujours Il Coûte Trop Cher (with Mike Allen) (2015)
- Ivan Icarus (2016)
- Foxgirl Cycle Song: 1 (2016)
- "The Wyrm of Lirr" (The Book of Dragons, ed. Jonathan Strahan, July 2020)
- "The Sole-Stitcher"(The Deadlands, November 2021)
- "Werewoman" (Strange Horizons, December 2021)
- "Nightworld", "Visiting Child", "The Ogress" (Ghoul II, March 2021)

=== Musical albums ===
- Alecto! Alecto! (as Brimstone Rhine) (July 2015)
- Headless Bride (as Brimstone Rhine) (Jan 2016)
- Corbeau Blanc, Corbeau Noir (2018)
