= Leah Cypess =

American author

- Born: July 5, 1977 (age 49); USA
- Occupation: Author
- Writing career
- Pen name: Leah Sokol
- Genre: speculative fiction
- Website: www.leahcypess.com

Leah Cypess is an American author of fantasy and science fiction, active in the field since 1995. Some of her earliest published stories were published under her maiden name, Leah Suslovich. She also writes Judaica under the pen name Leah Sokol.

== Biography ==
Cypess majored in biology at Brooklyn College and then studied law at Columbia Law School. She practiced law for close to two years at Debevoise & Plimpton LLP in New York City. She currently lives in Silver Spring, Maryland with her husband and four children.

== Literary career ==
Cypess wrote her first story in first grade; she sold her first professional story ("Temple of Stone") while still in high school. Continuing to write in her spare time, she sold her first novel fifteen years later. Her "Nanny's Day" was nominated for the 2013 Nebula Award for Best Short Story. "On the Ship" placed third in the 2018 Asimov's Readers' Poll for Best Short Story.

Her work has appeared in various periodicals, webzines and podcasts, including Analog Science Fiction & Fact, Asimov's Science Fiction, Cast of Wonders, Daily SF, Galaxy's Edge, Helix SF, Kaleria, The Magazine of Fantasy & Science Fiction, Marion Zimmer Bradley's Fantasy Magazine, Odyssey, Orson Scott Card's InterGalactic Medicine Show, Persistent Visions, StarShipSofa, and Strange Horizons, and the anthologies The Mythic Dream, Sword and Sorceress XXIII, Timeshift: Tales of Time, Unidentified Funny Objects, Year's Best YA Speculative Fiction 2013, and Year's Best YA Speculative Fiction 2015.

== Bibliography ==
=== Death Sworn series ===
- Death Sworn (2014)
- Death Marked (2015)

=== Mistwood Universe ===
- Mistwood (2010)
- Nightspell (2011)
- "Buried Above Ground" (2013)

=== Sisters Ever After ===
- Thornwood (2021)
- Glass Slippers (2022)
- The Piper's Promise (2023)
- The Last Rose (2023)
- Braided (2024)
- Sea Swept (2025)

=== Miriam's Magical Creature Files ===
- The Truth About the Tooth Fairy (2025)
- The Discovery of Dragons (2025)
- The Mystery of the Mermaid (2026)

=== Other novels ===
- The Spanish Plot (2019) (as Leah Sokol)
- The King's Horse: a Purim Story (2019) (as Leah Sokol)
- Future Me Saves the World (and Ruins My Life) (2025)

=== Collections ===
- Changelings & Other Stories (2012)

=== Short fiction ===
- "Shapeshifter's Journey" (1995) (as Leah Suslovich)
- "The Unicorn's Forest" (1995) (as Leah Suslovich)
- "Quests, Inc." (1995) (as Leah Suslovich)
- "Temple of Stone" (1997) (also as Leah Suslovich)
- "Changelings" (1998) (also as Leah Suslovich)
- "Dead Silent" (1998)
- "Silent Blade" (2006)
- "Shalott's Inn" (2008)
- "Fair Trade" (2011)
- "Twelvers" (2011)
- "Nanny's Day" (2012)
- "Clockwork" (2012)
- "Straw-Spun" (2012)
- "The Fifty-One Suitors of Princess Jamatpie" (2012)
- "Distant Like the Stars" (2013)
- "What We Ourselves Are Not" (2013)
- "Forgiveness" (2015)
- "Filtered" (2016)
- "BLU3RD" (2016)
- "Cupid's Compass" (2016)
- "Neko Brushes" (2017)
- "On the Ship" (2017)
- "In Defense of the End of the World" (2017)
- "The Forgetting" (2018)
- "Chocolate Chip Cookies with Love Potion Infusion" (2018)
- "Attachment Unavailable" (2018)
- "Best Served Slow" (2018)
- "Timshala" (2018)
- "Cost of Wonder" (2019)
- "All the Difference" (2019)
- "Blue as Blood" (2019)
- "Parenting License" (2019)
- "The Disappeared" (2019)
- "Uncommon" (2019)
- "Across the River" (2019)
- "A Pack of Tricks" (2020)
- "Stepsister" (2020)
- "A Sideways Slant of Light" (2020)
- "Of Them All" (2020)
- "Unredacted Reports from 1546" (2021)
- "What Togetherness Day Means to Me" (2021)
- "From the Fire" (2021)
- "The Night Dance" (2022)
- "Offloaders" (2022)
- "The Fairy Godmother Advice Column" (2022)
- "Frummer House" (2023)
- "The Scent of Cotton Candy" (2024)
- "Flipped" (2024)
- "The Thirteenth Dancer" (2024)
- "Finding Love in a Time Loop: A How-To Guide" (2025)
- "A Tide of Paper" (2025)

=== Nonfiction ===
- No Day Without Torah: the Story of Rav Meir Shapiro (2019) (as Leah Sokol)

=== Interviews ===
- Lobell, Kylie Ora. "Leah Cypess on Daf Yomi and 'No Day Without Torah,'" in Jewish Journal, Jan. 8, 2020.
- Thomas, Lynne M. "Interview: Lynne M. Thomas Interviews Leah Cypess" in Uncanny Magazine Podcast 44A, Jan. 4, 2022.
