= Bennett Madison =

American writer (born 1981)

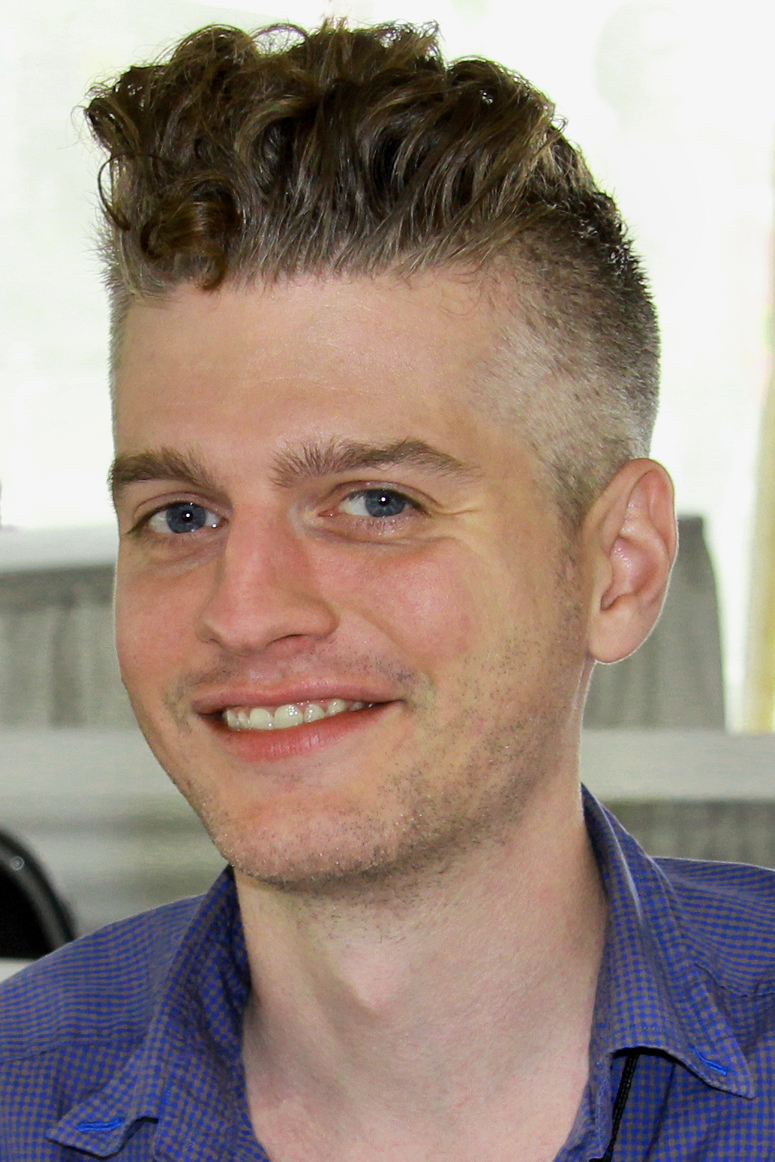
- Bennett Madison at the 2013 Texas Book Festival.
- Born: March 28, 1981 (age 45); Washington, D.C., U.S.
- Writing career
- Genre: novel
- Notable work: Lulu Dark YA series

Bennett Madison (born March 28, 1981) is an American author.

== Early life ==
Bennett Madison was born in 1981 in Washington, D.C., and grew up in Silver Spring, Maryland. He was educated at Montgomery Blair High School and attended Sarah Lawrence College. He was a childhood friend of John Walker Lindh.

== Career ==
Madison's first book, I Hate Valentine’s Day, a light polemic against Valentine's Day, was published in 2004. He moved to Brooklyn, New York shortly thereafter and began work on several novels. He has published two additional books—Lulu Dark Can See Through Walls (2005) and Lulu Dark & the Summer of the Fox (2006)—about a teenage girl detective, Lulu Dark. In 2009 HarperTeen published his third novel, The Blonde of the Joke. HarperTeen published September Girls in 2013.

Madison has described himself as being "an open and enthusiastic gay."

== Bibliography ==
- I Hate Valentine's Day (2004)
- Lulu Dark Can See Through Walls (2005)
- Lulu Dark & the Summer of the Fox (2006)
- The Blonde of the Joke (2009)
- September Girls (2013)
