= Daniel José Older =

American fantasy and YA writer

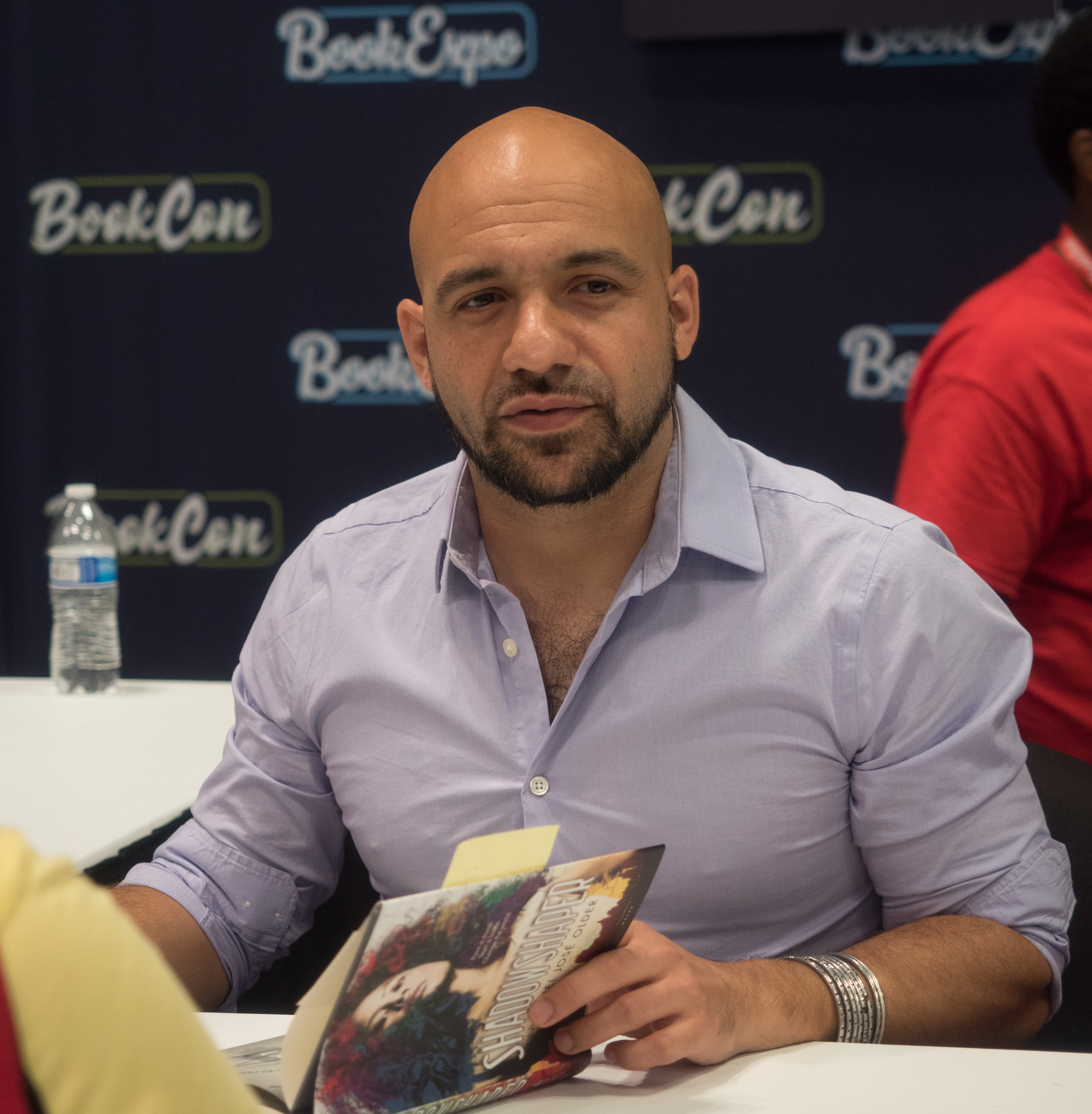
- Older at BookCon in June 2019
- Born: United States
- Occupations: Writer; editor; composer
- Relatives: Malka Older (sister)
- Writing career
- Genres: Fantasy, young adult fiction
- Website: ghoststar.net

Daniel José Older is an American fantasy and young adult fiction writer. His work includes the Shadowshaper Cypher series as well as novels in the Star Wars series.

== Career ==
Older's career as a writer began in 2014, in the back of the ambulance where he worked as an EMT in New York City. Older has said that he sees himself as an outsider to the publishing and literary scene. Describing himself as a disruptor, saying, “I entered the writing world clearly and strategically to do this thing, to write these books, to get them into the world and fuck with people…to generally fuck shit up.”

Older's formal writing foray onto the writing scene came with Salsa Nocturna, in 2012, which served as an introduction to key characters from his first series, Bone Street Rumba.

Older's debut novel, Half-Resurrection Blues, was published by Penguin Books in the first week of 2015. By the end of January 2015, the production company owned by Anika Noni Rose had optioned the television and films rights to the novel and the following two novels in the Bone Street Rumba series.

Later in 2015, Older's sophomore novel and series, Shadowshaper, was published by Scholastic. Following Older's tradition of inclusive writing, it follows a young Afro-Latina named Sierra who discovers her family's history of supernatural powers and her ability to interact with the spirit world. The book is the first of five works in the Shadowshaper Cypher.

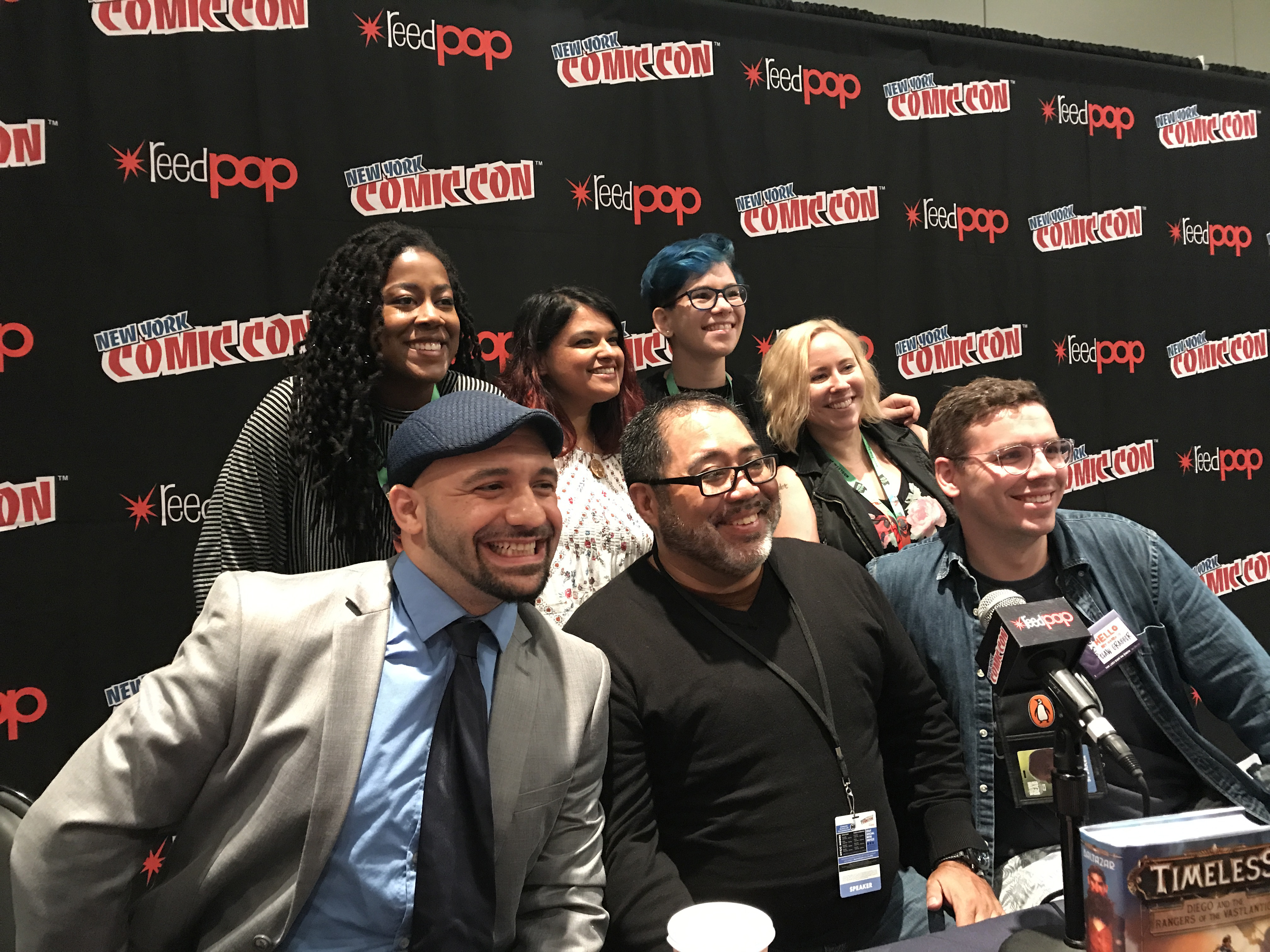
Older, bottom left, with other fantasy authors at a panel discussion at the 2017 New York Comic Con

Older has been critical of works that fail to include racial diversity. While he admires The Hunger Games series of novels, he was disappointed in the casting of the film series based on them, writing that the "whitewashing of Katniss was a tremendously unimaginative and useless act." Older has also been critical of "the popular surge of YA dystopias that followed in the wake of the Hunger Games trilogy," calling it "wildly undiverse." He attributes this lack of diversity to a "phenomenal lack of imagination" on the part of the authors, and a laziness he felt was designed to keep some people out of the picture, saying: "To be able to figure out all these quirky things about what you imagine the future will be like, and not somehow have any folks of color doing anything heroic or worthwhile in it, what happened?"

In 2018 Older released his first Star Wars novel Last Shot, which serves as a tie-in to Solo: A Star Wars Story. It stars Han Solo and Lando Calrissian and takes place between Return of the Jedi and The Force Awakens with flashback settings before and after Solo.

== World Fantasy Award Petition ==
In August 2014, Older started a petition to change the World Fantasy Award statuette from a bust of H. P. Lovecraft to one of African-American author Octavia Butler, on account of Lovecraft's racism, and concerns that it would be disrespectful to recipients, in particular those belonging to non-white ethnicities that Lovecraft held in particular contempt. In November 2015 it was announced that the World Fantasy Award trophy would no longer be modeled on Lovecraft. Older told The Guardian newspaper by email, "If fantasy as a genre truly wants to embrace all of its fans, and I believe it does, we can't keep lionising a man who used literature as a weapon against entire races. Writers of color… raised our voices collectively, en masse, and the World Fantasy folks heard us. Today, fantasy is a better, more inclusive, and stronger genre because of it."

== Views on generative AI ==
In public Patreon posts, Older has criticized the use of generative AI in writing and education. He has described it as "word-for-word theft" and "shit [that] rots our brains, our kids brains, and the planet" arguing that generative AI encourages plagiarism, reproduces cultural bias and harms the environment. He has also expressed support for Honor the Earth a Native American environmental non-profit that advocates against building AI data centers on native land. He is a named plaintiff in the ongoing AI copyright lawsuit Older et al. V. Meta Platforms.

== Bibliography ==
=== Novels ===
==== Shadowshaper Cypher series (Young Adult) ====
- Shadowshaper (2015)
- Ghost Girl in the Corner (2016)
- Dead Light March (2017)
- Shadowhouse Fall (2017)
- Shadowshaper Legacy (2020)

==== Bone Street Rumba series (Adult) ====
- Half-Resurrection Blues (2015)
- Midnight Taxi Tango (2016)
- Battle Hill Bolero (2017)

==== Dactyl Hill Squad series (Middle Grade) ====
- Dactyl Hill Squad (2018)
- Freedom Fire (2019)
- Thunder Run (2020)

==== Star Wars ====
- Last Shot (2018)
- The High Republic Adventures (2021)
- Race To Crashpoint Tower (2021)
- Trail of Shadows (2021)
- Midnight Horizon (2022)

==== Outlaw Saints duology (Young Adult) ====
- Ballad & Dagger (2022)
- Last Canto of the Dead (2023)

==== Standalone ====
- The Book of Lost Saints (2019)
- Flood City (2021)

=== Short fiction ===
==== Novellas ====
- Anyway: Angie (2014) a Bone Street Rumba novella
- Kia and Gio (2015) a Bone Street Rumba novella
- Ginga (2015) a Bone Street Rumba novella
- Ghost Girl in the Corner (2016) a Shadowshaper novella
- Dead Light March (2017) a Shadowshaper novella

==== Collections ====
- Salsa Nocturna (2012)

==== As editor ====
- Long Hidden: Speculative Fiction from the Margins of History (with Rose Fox, 2014)
- Lightspeed Magazine: People of Color Destroy Fantasy (2016)
