= Shadowshaper =

Young adult novel by Daniel José Older

- Author: Daniel José Older
- Genre: Urban fantasy, young adult
- Set in: Brooklyn
- Publisher: Scholastic/Levine
- Publication date: June 30, 2015
- Pages: 304
- ISBN: 978-0-545-59161-4
- Followed by: Shadowhouse Fall (2017)

Shadowshaper is a 2015 American urban fantasy young adult novel written by Daniel José Older. It is the first in the Shadowshaper Cypher series. It follows Sierra Santiago, an Afro-Boricua teenager living in Brooklyn. In the book it is revealed that she is the granddaughter of a "shadowshaper", or a person who infuses art with ancestral spirits. As forces of gentrification invade their community and a mysterious being who appropriates their magic begins to hunt the aging shadowshapers, Sierra must learn about her artistic and spiritual heritage to foil the killer. Four sequels have followed: "Ghostgirl in the Corner" (a novella, 2016), "Dead Light March" (a novella, 2017), Shadowhouse Fall (novel, 2017) and Shadowshaper Legacy (novel, 2020).

== Plot ==
As her summer vacation from Octavia Butler High School starts, Sierra Santiago begins work on a mural of a dragon on a building. Known as the Tower, it is an unfinished, five-story, concrete architectural aberration in a Brooklyn neighborhood of brownstones. The aging men of the community, including Manny "the Domino King" who publishes the Bed-Stuy Spotlight community newspaper, have asked Sierra to create the mural on the building to express their dissatisfaction.

While painting, she is startled to notice that an adjacent mural of a deceased neighborhood artist has begun to fade, change facial expressions, and cry a painted tear.

Back home, Sierra looks in on her abuelo, Grandpa Lázaro Corona, who has suffered a stroke and rarely speaks in complete sentences. Now, however, he suddenly voices a mysterious warning, apology, and urge to finish her mural as fast as she can. He mentions the shadowshapers and tells her to seek the help of Robbie, a Haitian classmate and fellow artist. Sierra tries to ask her mother, María Carmen Corona Santiago, about the shadowshapers but is rebuffed.

Sierra heads to a party with her best friend Bennaldra a.k.a. Bennie. At the party they see their friends and classmates, Big Jerome, Little Jerome, girlfriends Izzy & Tee, Pitkin, and many others. Sierra finds Robbie; they discuss Grandpa Lázaro and the shadowshapers. A walking corpse, or corpuscule, of a missing neighborhood man and shadowshaper, Vernon Chandler, interrupts the party and chases Sierra through the streets.

She later visits Columbia University's library and meets a Puerto-Rican librarian named Nydia Ochoa who helps Sierra research. Using the knowledge of her neighborhood, family, and mixed heritages, Sierra starts to pursue information about the mysterious shadowshapers, the force that is hunting them, and the spirit Lucera. She begins to learn of her own artistic power in order to protect her community and culture. The story ends with Sierra, her friends and Robbie ascending the Tower to defeat Johnathan Wick, a shadowshaper who had been exiled by Corona and the other old shadowshapers.

== Critical reception ==
The book received mostly positive reviews from critics. Holly Black of the New York Times called the novel "magnificent" and praises Older's depiction of "a Brooklyn that is vital, authentic and under attack"; the Times also named it a Notable Book of 2015. Young adult science fiction author Cory Doctorow's review in Boing Boing called it, "a thrilling supernatural YA novel with a diverse, likable cast of characters whose peril can only be averted through acceptance, true friendship and an embrace of their identity." Ashley C. Ford of The Guardian said the book, "represents a realistic future that’s more diverse than... other science fiction." Ebony Elizabeth Thomas of LA Times said Older's characters, "masterfully navigating the tightropes of coming of age while wrestling with myriad identities, the spectacular central figures of their own fantastic stories." The book was a finalist for the 2015 Kirkus Prize from Kirkus Reviews, which called it, "Warm, strong, vernacular, dynamic—a must." School Library Journal listed the book among their Best Books of 2015, saying, "A comfortable-in-her-own-skin heroine, magnetic portrayals of a multicultural cast, and scintillating suspense make for a knockout thriller." Publishers Weekly gave a starred review: "a well-executed plot of the exceptional child with a mysterious history standing forth to save her world, aided by a similarly gifted romantic interest." Sarah Hunter of Booklist gave it a starred review: "Smart writing with a powerful message that never overwhelms the terrific storytelling."

Amal Al-Mohtar of NPR said that while the book was "joyful and assertive and proud," its flaw was that "the plot unfolds in fits and starts; revelations occur haphazardly, awkwardly delayed and then in a rush."

== Adaptation ==
Anika Noni Rose and her production company Roaring Virgin Productions have optioned the television and film rights for Shadowshaper (Rose previously acquired the rights to Older's series Bone Street Rumba).
