= The Adoration of Jenna Fox =

Young adult science fiction novel

- Author: Mary E. Pearson
- Series: The Jenna Fox Chronicles
- Genre: science fiction, young adult fiction
- Publication date: April 1, 2008
- ISBN: 9780805076684
- Followed by: Fox Inheritance

The Adoration of Jenna Fox is a young adult science fiction novel by Mary E. Pearson, published by Henry Holt and Company in 2008. Set in near-future southern California, the plot follows seventeen-year-old Jenna Fox, who has recently awoken from a coma. It is the first in The Jenna Fox Chronicles trilogy, which also includes Fox Inheritance and Fox Forever. The novel explores themes of medical ethics and biological engineering.

== Plot ==
Jenna Fox is seventeen years old and has recently awoken from an eighteen-month coma. She has very little memory of her life and identity before the accident, and reconstructs her life from home videos of herself before the accident that put her in the coma. Jenna lives with her parents and her grandmother, Lily.

At a Catholic mission, Jenna meets fellow teenagers Dane and Ethan, both of whom warn her to stay away from the other. At school, she meets Allys, an amputee with prosthetic limbs who is an advocate for increased government regulation of medical procedures. Allys tells Jenna about a substance called Bio Gel, which is used to generate artificial human organs, and Jenna discovers that the company behind Bio Gel is owned by her father. Ethan tells Jenna that he was previously held in a juvenile detention center for attacking a man, and the two kiss.

Jenna finds a locked closet in her parents' house and opens it. Inside, she finds three computers, labeled with the names Kara, Locke, and Jenna. In attempting to remove the computer with her name from its stand, Jenna slices her hand and instead of bleeding, finds that she is made of Bio Gel. Jenna confronts her mother, who tells her that Jenna's body was almost completely burned in the accident, and only 10% of her brain could be salvaged. Jenna's parents decided to reconstruct her entire body using Bio Gel, but since such extensive use of the substance was illegal, they moved from Boston to southern California to keep her in hiding. Jenna's parents ask her to keep this a secret.

Jenna tells Ethan that she is made of Bio Gel, and he tells her that the man he attacked was a man who was selling drugs to his brother. Ethan advises Jenna not to tell Allys that she is made of Bio Gel, fearing that Allys will report her to the authorities.

While browsing the internet from a neighbor's computer, Jenna discovers that the accident that put her in a coma was caused when she drove a car off of cliff when her friends, Kara and Locke, were also in the vehicle. She also discovers that the computers in her parents' closet were digital backups of their consciousnesses. Dane attacks Jenna, but Jenna is able to defend herself. She later remembers the accident and realizes that Kara was driving the vehicle, and not Jenna.

Allys, who is now suffering a life-threatening infection, has discovered Jenna's secret. When Ethan and Jenna visit Allys in the hospital, Allys tells them that she has asked her parents to report Jenna. After discovering that the computer backups will be moved, Lily and Jenna work together to destroy them, and Jenna throws the computers into a pond. Allys' parents ask Jenna's father for help saving their daughter's life.

Two hundred and sixty years after the main events of the novel, Jenna and Allys are still living. Jenna was in a relationship with Ethan until his death, and is now raising their child, Kayla, who was born through a surrogate.

== Publication and reception ==
The Adoration of Jenna Fox was first published on April 1, 2008, by Henry Holt and Company, an imprint of Macmillan Publishers. It received generally positive reviews and won numerous awards, including the Golden Kite Honor Award and the Kirkus Best Young Adult Book award. A review in Kirkus Reviews compared the novel to Eva by Peter Dickinson.

== Film adaptation ==
In 2015, Dolphin Entertainment optioned the film rights to The Adoration of Jenna Fox, which was to be adapted for the screen by screenwriter Gary Williams. As of May 2024, the film has not been released.
