= Ysabeau S. Wilce =

American novelist

- Born: Unknown; California, US
- Occupation: Novelist
- Writing career
- Period: 2006 to present
- Genres: Fantasy, Speculative fiction
- Notable works: Flora Segunda, Flora's Dare
- Website: yswilce.com

External image
- Ysabeau S. Wilce, circa 2007

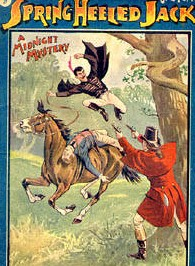
Spring Heeled Jack (1904), who inspired Wilce's Bouncing Boy Terror

Ysabeau S. Wilce (pronounced Iz-a-bow Wils) is an American author of young adult fantasy novels. Her novels feature the rebellious young heroine Flora Fyrdraaca and her adventures in the fictional land of Califa.

== Life ==
Ysabeau S. Wilce was born in Northern California. As an adult she has traveled the world and lived in San Francisco, Anchorage, Miami, Mexico City, Madrid, Los Angeles, Maryland, Phoenix, Philadelphia, and Brooklyn. She has a graduate degree in military history and lives in Oakland.

== Works ==
=== Novels ===
- Flora Segunda: Being the Magickal Mishaps of a Girl of Spirit, Her Glass-Gazing Sidekick, Two Ominous Butlers (One Blue), a House with Eleven Thousand Rooms, and a Red Dog (2007)
- Flora's Dare: How a Girl of Spirit Gambles All to Expand Her Vocabulary, Confront a Bouncing Boy Terror, and Try to Save Califa from a Shaky Doom (Despite Being Confined to Her Room) (2008)
- Flora's Fury: How a Girl of Spirit and a Red Dog Confound Their Friends, Astound Their Enemies, and Learn the Importance of Packing Light (2012)

=== Short-story collections ===
- Prophecies, Libels & Dreams: Stories of Califa (2014)

== Awards ==
- Winner of the 2008 Andre Norton Award for Young Adult Science Fiction and Fantasy for Flora’s Dare: How a Girl of Spirit Gambles All to Expand Her Vocabulary, Confront a Bouncing Boy Terror, and Try to Save Califa from a Shaky Doom (Despite Being Confined to Her Room)
- Two-time Otherwise Award Honor List Member
- A New York Times Editor's Choice
- A VOYA Best Book of 2006
- A Kirkus Best Book of 2007
