= Greg van Eekhout =

American science fiction author

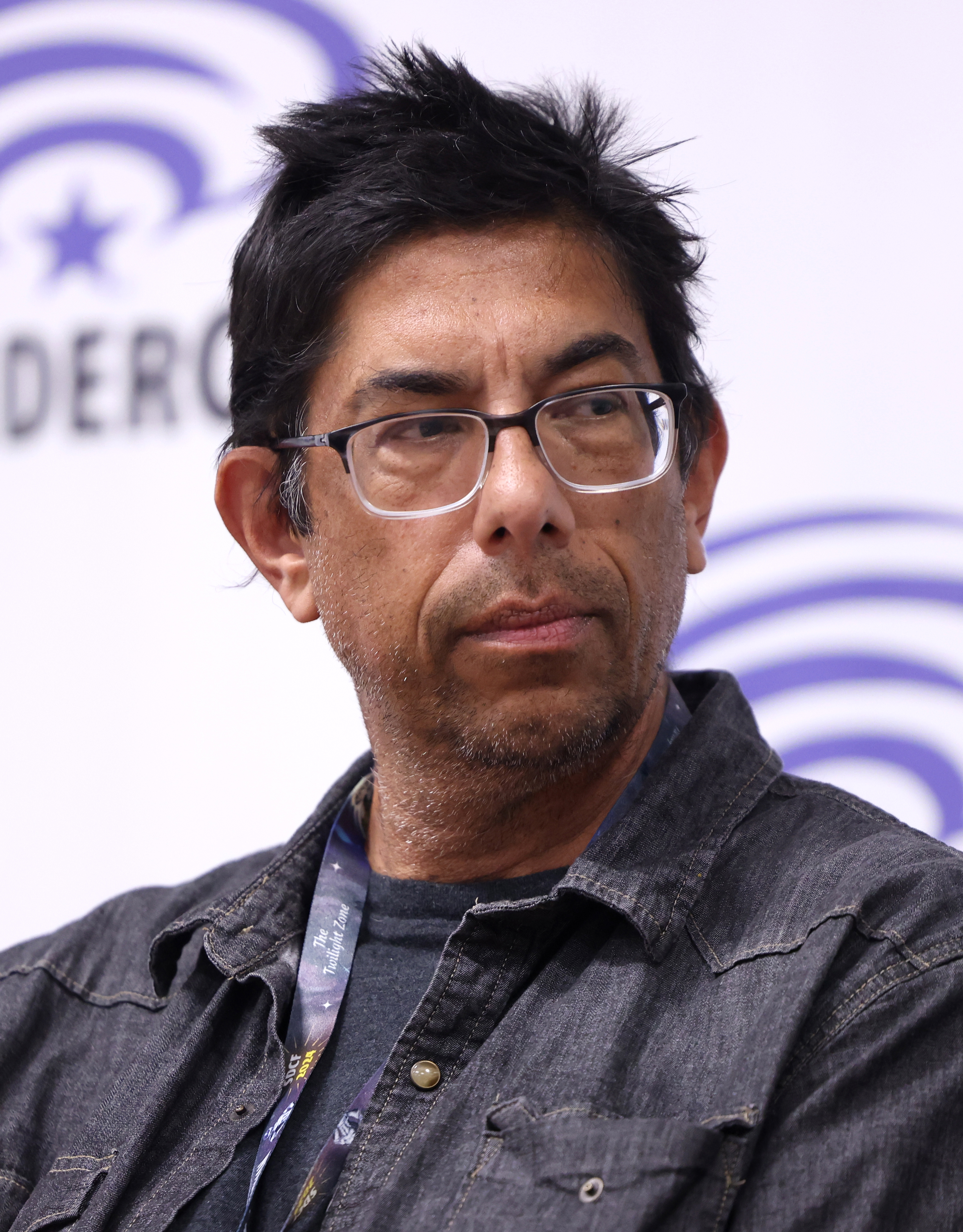
Greg van Eekhout at the 2025 WonderCon

Greg van Eekhout is an American science fiction and fantasy writer. His "In the Late December" (2003) was nominated for the Nebula Award for Best Short Story, and his middle-grade fantasy novel The Boy at the End of the World was nominated for the 2012 Andre Norton Award for Young Adult Science Fiction and Fantasy.

== Biography and career ==
Van Eekhout's parents are of Indo (Dutch-Indonesian) extraction. His last name (meaning "of Oakwood") is pronounced, in his own explanation, "like this: Van, as in the kind of thing you drive, eek, as in, 'Eek, killer robots are stomping the rutabagas!' and 'hout', like 'out' with an h in front of it. The emphasis is on the Eek."

He grew up in Los Angeles and attended UCLA, where he received a Bachelor's in English. He earned a Master's in Educational Media and Computers at Arizona State, and worked for a time at ASU designing multimedia.

He attended the writing workshop Viable Paradise in 1999. His first professionally published story, "Wolves Till the World Goes Down," (2001) appeared in the anthology Starlight 3 and was later reprinted in Fantasy: The Best of 2001. His story "In the Late December" (2003) was nominated for Nebula Award for Best Short Story. His work has also appeared in a number of other places, including Asimov's Science Fiction, Realms of Fantasy, The Magazine of Fantasy and Science Fiction, and Strange Horizons.

His first novel, Norse Code, an adult urban fantasy, was published by Bantam Books in May 2009. His second novel, a middle-grade fantasy titled Kid Vs. Squid, was released by Bloomsbury Children's USA on May 11, 2010. The Boy at the End of the World, also a middle-grade fantasy, was released in June 2011 by Bloomsbury Children's USA.

His fourth novel, California Bones, was published by Tor Books on June 10, 2014. It is the first in a planned trilogy based on his 2006 short story "The Osteomancer’s Son", anthologized in Year’s Best Fantasy 7 and Best Fantasy of the Year: 2007. The second in the series, Pacific Fire, was published on January 27, 2015.

He currently lives in San Diego, California.

== Bibliography ==
=== Novels ===
- Norse Code (Bantam Books, May 2009)
- Kid Vs. Squid (Bloomsbury Children's USA, May 2010)
- The Boy at the End of the World (Bloomsbury Children's USA, June 2011)
- California Bones (Tor Books, June 2014)
- Pacific Fire (Tor Books, 2015)
- Dragon Coast (Tor Books, 2015)
- Voyage of the Dogs (HarperCollins Children's, September 2018)
- COG (HarperCollins Children's, October 2019)
- Weird Kid (HarperCollins Children's, July 2021)
- Fenris & Mott (HarperCollins Children's, August 2022)
- The Ghost Job (HarperCollins, September 2023)
- Happy Town (HarperCollins, October 2024

=== Short fiction ===
- "Wolves Till the World Goes Down", Starlight 3 (2001); included in Fantasy: The Best of 2001
- "Show and Tell", Strange Horizons (June 2002)
- "Will You Be an Astronaut?", The Magazine of Fantasy & Science Fiction (September 2002)
- "In the Late December", Strange Horizons (online) (Dec 2003)
- "Robots and Falling Hearts" (with Tim Pratt), Realms of Fantasy (April 2005); Year’s Best Fantasy 6
- "Anywhere There’s a Game", Realms of Fantasy (April 2006)
- "The Osteomancer’s Son", Asimov’s Science Fiction (April/May 2006); Year’s Best Fantasy 7, Best Fantasy of the Year: 2007
- "The Holy City and Em’s Reptile Farm", Other Earths (DAW BOOKS, April 2009)
- "Last Son of Tomorrow", Tor.com (online) (May 2009)
- "On the Fringes of the Fractal", 2113: Stories Inspired by the Music of Rush (2016); The Best American Science Fiction and Fantasy: 2017
- "The Wolf and the Manticore", The Book of Magic (2018)
- "Polly Wanna Cracker", Wastelands: The New Apocalypse (2019)
- "Big Box", Uncanny Magazine (July 2019)
- "Spaceship October", Escape Pod (2020)
