= Sal and Gabi Break the Universe =

2019 novel by Carlos Hernandez

- Author: Carlos Hernandez
- Language: English
- Series: Sal and Gabi series (book 1)
- Genre: Science fiction
- Publisher: Rick Riordan Presents
- Publication date: March 5, 2019
- Publication place: United States
- Followed by: Sal and Gabi Fix the Universe

Sal and Gabi Break the Universe is a novel written by Carlos Hernandez. It is a science fiction novel. It was published by Disney-Hyperion in March 2019. The book also won the Pura Belpré Award. Unlike other books Rick Riordan wrote or edited, this book contains no references to any kind of mythology. A short story by Hernandez about the Sal and Gabi characters are featured in the anthology book, The Cursed Carnival and Other Calamities.

== Setting ==
Sal Vidón begins his first year at Culeco Academy of the Arts, where his unusual abilities and his type-one diabetes quickly make him stand out. On his third day, Sal becomes involved in an incident with bully Yasmany Robles. Gabi Reál, the student council president and newspaper editor, initially defends Yasmany but becomes fascinated by Sal after discovering that he can perform genuine magic. Characters

Main characters include the titular Sal Vidón and Gabi Reál. Sal is a fun-loving magician who can reach into other universes. After the death of his biological mother several years prior to the start of the book, Sal has been known to find version of his mother from other universes and communicate with them, though they are always different from his version. Gabi, a girl who Sal befriends over the course of the first book and grows closer to in the sequel, can be described as the optimistic student president of Culeco Academy. Gustavo Vidón is the father of Sal, and a "calamity physicist", who remarried to a woman named Lucy Vidón after his first wife, Floramaria Vidón and Sal's mother, died. He is often referred to as Papi by Sal. Lucy Vidón, Gustavo Vidón's second wife, is often referred to as American Stepmom by Sal. Yasmany Robles is one of the book's primary antagonists, though throughout the course of the duology he is revealed to be kinder. He is a bully at school who has a hole to another universe created by Sal in his locker.

Supporting characters include Gladis Machao, a girl who attends Culeco Academy with Sal and Gabi. At one point in the book, she comes into contact with an alternative universe version of herself, prompting her to get mad-nine AI named Bonita, Lightning Dad, a weatherman, and Meow Dad, a fat cat from another universe. Gabi's true, biological father is never revealed. Ignacio "Iggy" Reál is the younger brother of Gabi. In the first book, Iggy is an infant, but progresses to the stages of being an early toddler in the second installment in the series. Iggy is critically ill upon his birth, so Sal is able to connect him to an alternate-universe version of himself so he can heal. Mr. Milgros is a janitor at Caleco Academy. In book two, he installs an artificial reality into a toilet. Aventura Rios is another girl who attends Culeco Academy, and Doctor Doctorpants is a silly teacher. The Entropy Sweeper is an artificial intelligence created by Gustavo.

== Development ==
Sal and Gabi Break the Universe was first published on March 5, 2019 as part of the "Rick Riordan Presents" publishing imprint and the first book in the Sal and Gabi duology. After the book's release, the editor and creator of "Rick Riordan Presents", Rick Riordan, dressed up as Colonial, Greco-Roman, purple wizard, and steampunk version of himself from alternate universes in celebration of the book. After the second book, Sal and Gabi Fix the Universe, author Carlos Hernandez announced that he did not have plans to write a sequel. A sneak peek from the next book was released in April 2020, prior to its release. The book is 400 pages long.

== Sequel ==
A sequel, also by Hernandez, entitled, Sal and Gabi Fix the Universe was published in May 2020. It continues Sal and Gabi's story as Papi's remembranation machine threatens to destroy the universe by closing the holes that Sal made in it. At the same time, Sal is visited by an alternate version of Gabi called FixGabi whose universe was destroyed by the remembranation machine.

== Television adaptation ==
In September 2021, it was announced that Disney Branded Television is developing a television series adaptation of the novel from Eva Longoria and her production company UnbeliEVAble Entertainment.

== Reception ==
The Laughing Place gave the book very high reviews, saying "This is a story about family, how Sal’s family moves on in grief and how Gabi’s family deals with the illness of the youngest member, Ignacio."
