= Ingrid Law =

American novelist

- Born: May 1, 1970 (age 56)
- Occupation: Author

Ingrid Law (born May 1, 1970) is a New York Times bestselling author. In 2009, her children's fantasy novel Savvy was awarded a Newbery Honor medal. When Law was six her family moved to Colorado and lives in the Pacific Northwest.

== Bibliography ==
- Savvy (2008)
- Scumble (2010)
- Switch (2015)
- Guys Read: Heroes and Villains (2017)
