= The Queen of Attolia =

2000 young-adult historical fantasy novel

- First edition
- Author: Megan Whalen Turner
- Cover artist: Walter Gaffney-Kessell
- Series: Queen's Thief
- Genre: Young-adult fantasy
- Publisher: Greenwillow Books, William Morrow and Company
- Publication date: April 2000
- Publication place: United States
- Media type: Print (hardcover)
- Pages: 279
- ISBN: 0-688-17423-X
- OCLC: 48189446
- LC Class: PZ7.T85565 Qu
- Preceded by: The Thief
- Followed by: The King of Attolia

The Queen of Attolia is a young adult fantasy novel by Megan Whalen Turner, published by the Greenwillow Books imprint of William Morrow in 2000 (later, of HarperCollins). It is the second novel in the Queen's Thief series that Turner inaugurated with The Thief in 1996.

== Setting ==
The book is set in fictional landscapes in the small countries of Attolia, Eddis and Sounis, which are modelled in Ancient Greek and other territories around the Mediterranean, particularly Italy. The characters' names are Greek, and references are made to Greek Classical literature. Though the story's pantheon is fictional, the name of the world's primary deity, Hephestia (similar to Hephaestus), suggests influence from Greek mythology. The fantasy world also includes elements from later European cultures, such as guns, pocket watches, printed books and stained glass windows.

== Plot ==
Eugenides, the Thief of Eddis, has been caught spying on the Queen of Attolia. He expects to be hanged, but the Queen instead resorts to an ancient punishment for thievery by having his right hand removed by sword. Eugenides returns to Eddis and experiences deep depression. Despite Attolia seeming to be a heartless ruler, she is shown to secretly regret her action.

The countries of Eddis and Attolia are soon at war, with the neighboring land of Sounis fighting for both sides. Attolia’s ambassador from the Mede Empire, Nahuseresh, also manipulates the conflict as he pays extravagant attention to the beautiful Queen of Attolia while serving his own agenda. Attolia juggles her overattentive ambassador, the rebellious barons who do not believe a woman can rule alone, and a bloody, costly war.

Meanwhile, a visit from the magus of Sounis awakens Eugenides to the fact that his country is at war. His cousin, the Queen of Eddis, may lose her throne and country, forcing him to take on a new role. Eugenides begins to scheme, appearing to shutter his heart just as Attolia has. Eugenides succeeds in stealing the Magus from Sounis, and temporarily turning Sounis and Attolia against each other. This gives the tiny country of Eddis some reprieve as Sounis and Attolia focus on each other instead of Eddis.

== Reception ==
The Queen of Attolia received starred reviews from the Horn Book, Kirkus Reviews, and Publishers Weekly, as well as favorable reviews in other review publications.
