= Savvy (novel) =

2008 novel by Ingrid Law

- First edition cover
- Author: Ingrid Law
- Illustrator: Elizabeth Parker
- Cover artist: Hennie Haworth
- Language: English
- Series: Savvy
- Subject: Kid's fiction coming-of-age tale
- Genre: Fiction, children's literature
- Publisher: Penguin Group
- Publication date: May 1, 2008
- Publication place: United States of America
- Media type: Hardback, paperback audio
- Pages: 342
- ISBN: 978-0-14-132419-7
- OCLC: 222152797
- LC Class: PZ7.L41836 Sav 2008
- Followed by: Scumble

Savvy is a 2008 coming of age novel written by Ingrid Law, illustrated by Elizabeth Parker.

== Characters ==
- Mississippi "Mibs" Beaumont – The thirteen-year-old main protagonist. Throughout the book, she reminisces about her family and speculates about her own future, as she feels she is on the cusp of growing up. Her savvy is to be able to hear the thoughts of people when they have ink on their body, such as tattoos.
- Fish Beaumont – The fourteen-year-old brother of Mibs who has the savvy to control rain or wind. He is often hot-tempered which affects his savvy but it can also be said that he is overprotective.
- Rocket Beaumont – The oldest child of the household, at age seventeen. His savvy is to control electricity. He loses confidence at the end of the book after nearly destroying a hospital with his savvy, and moves to his aunt and uncle's ranch in Wyoming, where he can let his savvy loose without anyone noticing.
- Samson Beaumont – Seven years old and Mibs' youngest brother. He likes hiding in dark, quiet places and does not talk much. His touch is noted as having a strengthening effect on people, although it is not clear whether this is his savvy manifesting early or a part of his personality. When he appears, however, everyone around him is stronger.
- Gypsy Beaumont – The youngest member of the family, at three years old, and Mibs' younger (and only) sister.
- Jenny "Momma" Beaumont (maiden name O'Connell) – The mother of the family. Her savvy is to be perfect in everything she does, including making perfect mistakes.
- Abram "Poppa" Beaumont – The father of the family, who was hospitalized after being in a 10-car pile-up. He has no savvy because he married into the family but near the end of the book Mibs says his savvy is "not giving up on anything or anyone". He has a tattoo of a mermaid from when he was in the navy. Supposedly the males in his family all lose their hair before the age of 30.
- Grandpa Bomba O'Connell – Jenny's father. His savvy is the ability to move land, creating earthquakes, creating new lands, separating land, etc. This is the reason for living in Kansaska-Nebransas, a piece of land created by him reserved for the Beaumonts.
- Grandma Dollop O'Connell (maiden name Payne) – Jenny's mother. Her savvy is to capture radio waves. She dies before the beginning of the book, but appears in some of Mibs' flashbacks.
- Lester Swan – Driver of the Bible bus. He is very soft-hearted and allows the children to travel on his bus. He has tattoos saying "Rhonda" and "Carlene", who are his mother and his former girlfriend who appear in his thoughts constantly sniping at him.
- Lill Kiteley – A waitress at the Emerald Truck stop Diner and Lounge. Known for being late all the time. She takes care of the children after she is fired, and quickly falls in love with Lester.
- Roberta "Bobbi" Meeks – Mrs. Rosemary's 16-year-old daughter. She acts very tough, but is secretly quite sentimental. She has an eyebrow piercing and a small press on temporary tattoo on her back that portrays an angel with vague demonic features. She has a crush on Rocket.
- Will Meeks Jr. – Mrs. Rosemary's 14-year-old grandson, who was raised as her son. He likes Mibs romantically and as a friend, and accepts her in spite of her savvy. Will wants to be like his father, Bill Meeks who is a trooper.
- Dinah Kale – Momma's sister whose savvy is to make anyone do whatever she wants (smiling at the person and telling them what to do). She does not appear in the book, but she features heavily in the Beaumont's flashbacks/stories.
- Rosemary Meeks – The preacher's wife. She takes over the Beaumont household after Momma and Rocket leave. She is a strict mother, yet she cares for each of her children in her own way.
- Bill Meeks Sr. – Mrs. Rosemary's oldest son, who is a state trooper and Will Junior's father. He had Will Junior when he was sixteen.
- Ozzie "The Great and Powerful" – The former boss of Lill and the owner of the chicken Emerald Truck Stop and Diner.
- Carlene – Lester's former girlfriend whose cousin owns the Heartland Bible Supply Company. Near the end of the book she is presumably arrested.

== Critical reception ==
Kirkus Reviews awarded Savvy a starred review, praising Law's "fertile imagination" and "dab hand for likable, colorful characters". Susan Faust of the San Francisco Chronicle called the storytelling "magical" but noted that some of the adventures were improbable. The website Kidsreads called it "fun, hilarious, relatable and enduring".

In addition to the 2009 Newbery Honor, Savvy was named the second runner up in the 2011 Indian Paintbrush Book Award.

== Scumble ==
The sequel to Savvy, Scumble, was released in August 2010. The plot follows a cousin of Mibs', Ledger Kale, whose savvy is to break anything, and also takes place nine years afterward.

His parents decide to leave Ledge and his sister Fedora (Fe) in Wyoming for the summer, along with cousins Samson and Gypsy Beaumont and Marisol and Mesquite O'Connell (Autry's daughters, who levitate objects), so Ledge can learn to scumble his savvy before he returns home to Indiana. Sarah Jane keeps finding him and disturbing him, as she wants to know more about The Flying Cattleheart, Uncle Autry's bug ranch (Autry can control bugs). As her father keeps finding Ledge and his daughter talking, he grows angrier and eventually decides to foreclose and destroy the ranch. Throughout, Ledge and SJ begin to fall in love, and Ledge starts going to an auto repair woman named Winona, who uses spare parts for sculptures, which Ledge begins to do using his savvy. Winona meets Rocket, and the two evidently begin a relationship, which is a release for Rocket, who withdrew into himself after accidentally electrocuting (though not killing) Bobbi Meeks, who was in the first book.

Eventually, Uncle Autry reveals the truth about the Cabots: SJ's mother was the last in a savvy family and was best friends with Autry; she had the ability to grow trees abnormally quickly and turn other objects into trees. She and Noble Cabot got married where Fish and his bride Mellie did, out at the ranch. A few years after SJ was born, Summer Cabot became deathly ill, and in an act that grieved and enraged her husband, transformed herself into a tree before she could die. Noble hated Autry after that and shielded SJ from the world of savvies. However, Sarah Jane has now come into her own savvy, to make anyone believe something she has written.

== Switch ==
The sequel to "Savvy" and "Scumble", Switch was released in September 2015. The plot follows Mibs' sister Gypsy who originally has the savvy to see the past and future, which inexplicably becomes the ability to stop time, and takes place a few months after Ledge's adventure.
