= Megan Whalen Turner =

American children's writer

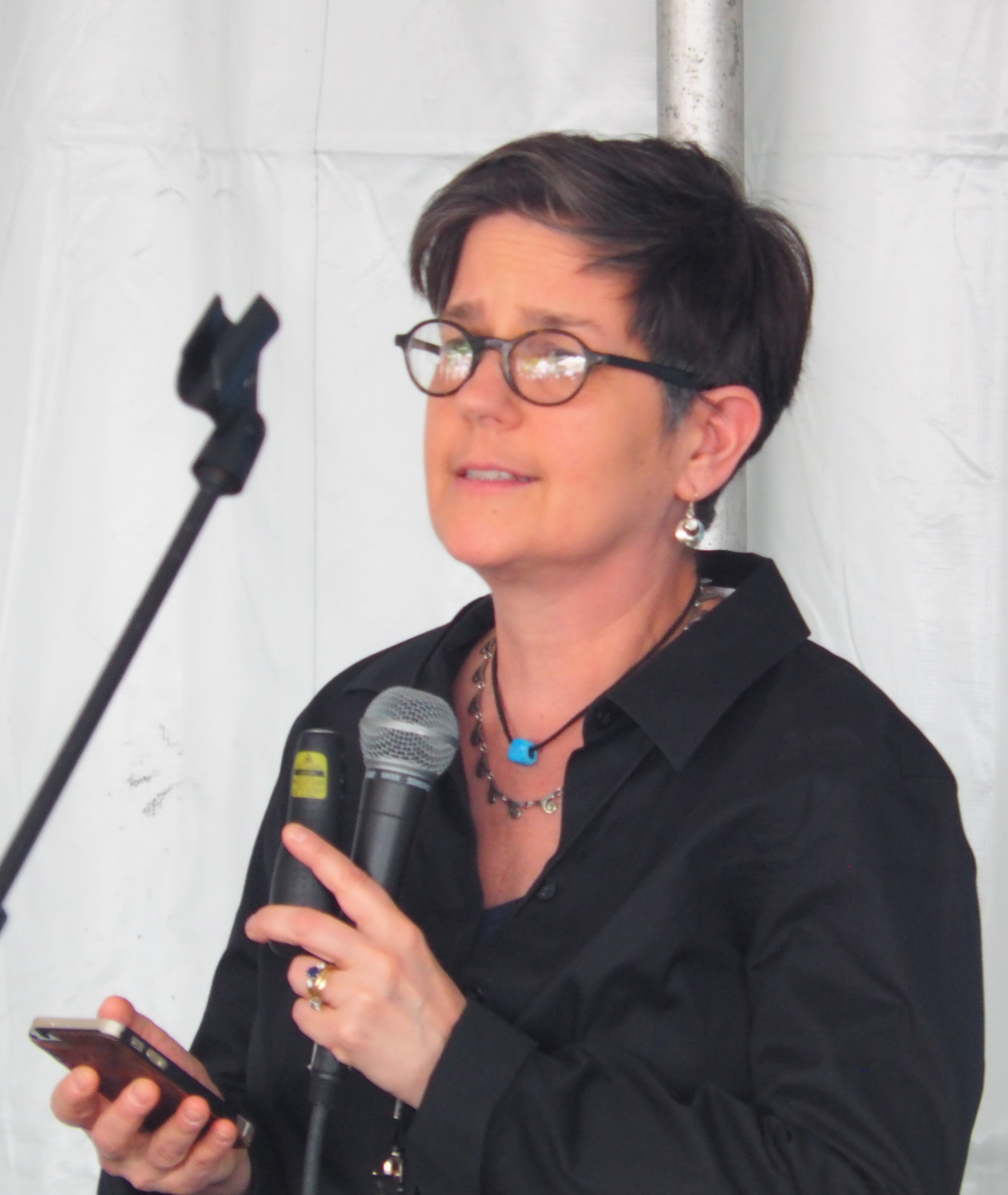
- Born: Megan Whalen; November 21, 1965 (age 60); Fort Sill, Oklahoma, U.S.
- Education: University of Chicago (BA)
- Occupation: Author
- Spouse: Mark Turner (m. 1987)
- Children: 3
- Writing career
- Years active: 1995–present
- Genre: Young adult fiction
- Notable awards: Newbery Honor
- Website: meganwhalenturner.org

Megan Whalen Turner (born November 21, 1965) is an American writer of fantasy fiction for young adults. She is best known for her novel The Thief and its five sequels. In 1997, The Thief was named a Newbery Honor book. In 2026, The Thief and The Queen of Attolia were awarded The Grand Prix de I'Imaginaire in the Foreign Young Adult Novel category.

== Early life ==
Turner received her BA with honors in English language and literature from the University of Chicago in 1987. Before becoming an author, she worked as a children's book buyer for bookstores in Chicago and Washington D.C.

== Career ==
Turner began writing a collection of short fantasy stories after moving to California in 1989. She published the stories as Instead of Three Wishes: Magical Short Stories in 1995.

Turner is best known for her series of young adult novels primarily revolving around a character named Eugenides. Turner has no official name for the series herself, sometimes referring to it as "The Geniad", but fans have coined it The Queen's Thief. The first book in the series, The Thief, won a Newbery Honor award. The subsequent books in the series are The Queen of Attolia, The King of Attolia, A Conspiracy of Kings, Thick as Thieves, and Return of the Thief.

Turner was the 2013 Literary Guest of Honor and Keynote Speaker at the Life, the Universe, & Everything professional science fiction and fantasy arts symposium.

In July 2018, Turner announced the March 2019 publication date of Return of the Thief. This was first pushed back to spring 2020 before the book was published on October 6, 2020, concluding the series.

Her additional work includes a short story collection titled Instead of Three Wishes, and a short story, "The Baby in the Night Deposit Box", published in a collection called Firebirds, edited by Sharyn November. "The Baby in the Night Deposit Box" was selected for The Year's Best Fantasy and Horror. She has also written six short stories — "Thief!", "Destruction", "Eddis", "Knife Dance, "Wineshop", and "Alyta's Missing Earring" — which are set in the world of The Thief, which were initially uncollected. These, along with "never-before-published stories, vignettes and excerpts, poetry and rhymes, a guide to inspiring objects from museums around the world, and a very special recipe for almond cake" were collected and published in Moira's Pen (2022).

== Personal life ==
Her husband is the cognitive scientist Mark Turner. The couple has three sons.

== Bibliography ==
- 1995 Instead of Three Wishes: Magical Short Stories
- 2003 Firebirds (contribution)

=== The Queen's Thief series ===
- 1996 The Thief
- 2000 The Queen of Attolia
- 2006 The King of Attolia
- 2010 A Conspiracy of Kings
- 2017 Thick as Thieves
- 2020 Return of the Thief
- 2022 Moira's Pen
