= The Thief (Turner novel) =

1996 novel by Megan Whalen Turner

- First edition
- Author: Megan Whalen Turner
- Cover artist: Walter Gaffney-Kessell
- Series: Queen's Thief
- Genre: Young adult fantasy
- Publisher: Greenwillow Books
- Publication date: October 1, 1996
- Publication place: United States
- Media type: Print (hardcover), audiobook
- Pages: 219
- ISBN: 0-688-14627-9
- OCLC: 33209215
- LC Class: PZ7.T85565 Th 1996
- Followed by: The Queen of Attolia

The Thief is a young adult fantasy novel by Megan Whalen Turner published in 1996 by Greenwillow Books, an imprint of William Morrow (later, of HarperCollins). It is the first in the Queen's Thief series, the sixth book of which was published in 2020.

It was a runner-up for the 1997 Newbery Medal and a Newbery Honor Book.

In 2012, The Thief was ranked number 13 among the Top 100 Chapter Books in a survey published by School Library Journal, a monthly with a primarily U.S. audience.

== Plot ==
Gen, a notorious thief, languishes in the king's prison, dreaming of freedom and regretting his reckless boasts. His skills have earned him chains and a reputation that keeps him under constant watch. Despite the grim conditions, Gen's mind is sharp, and he clings to the hope of escape. His fortunes change when the king's magus arrives, offering a chance at freedom in exchange for Gen's unique talents. The magus needs a thief to steal a legendary artifact, Hamiathes's Gift, which could secure the throne of Eddis for the king of Sounis. Gen, driven by ambition and the promise of freedom, agrees to the perilous journey.

Gen joins the magus, his apprentices Ambiades and Sophos, and the soldier Pol on a treacherous journey across the kingdom. The group faces challenges, from harsh landscapes to internal tensions. Gen's skills are tested as he navigates the group's dynamics, particularly with the arrogant Ambiades and the naive Sophos. As they travel, Gen learns more about the political stakes and the true nature of their quest. The magus reveals that Hamiathes's Gift is not just a stone but a symbol of power that could unite or divide kingdoms.

The group reaches the temple where Hamiathes's Gift is hidden. Gen, relying on his wits and skills, enters the maze-like structure alone. Inside, he encounters traps and the bones of those who failed before him. The temple is a testament to the gods' power, and Gen's resolve is tested as he searches for the elusive artifact. His journey through the maze is fraught with danger, but Gen's determination and cleverness guide him to the heart of the temple, where he finally discovers the Gift.

Within the temple, Gen experiences a profound encounter with the gods. He realizes that the Gift is not just a stone but a divine artifact with the power to change destinies. The gods, watching over him, seem to guide his actions, and Gen feels the weight of their expectations. This encounter leaves him with a deeper understanding of his role in the unfolding events and the responsibilities that come with possessing such a powerful object.

His actions have not only secured the Gift but also strengthened the position of Eddis against its rivals. The magus, now aware of Gen's true identity, realizes the depth of his misjudgment and the significance of Gen's actions.

With Hamiathes's Gift in her possession, the queen of Eddis solidifies her rule and strengthens her kingdom's position. Gen's daring theft and the subsequent political maneuvering prevent a war and ensure a fragile peace between the kingdoms. The magus returns to Sounis, wiser and more respectful of the young thief who outwitted him. Gen, now a hero in his homeland, reflects on his journey and the unexpected path that led him to fulfill his life journey.

== Reception ==
Publishers Weekly is a captivating tale that blends adventure, mythology, and political intrigue. The review highlights Turner's skillful world-building, drawing readers into a richly imagined landscape inspired by ancient Greece. "Turner weaves a spellbinding narrative," the review notes, praising the intricate plot and the complex characters that drive the story forward. This is a world both ancient and timeless.
