= Ignyte Award for Outstanding Novel – Young Adult =

Annual literary award for speculative fiction

- Awarded for: Works over 40,000 words for a young adult audience, written by up to 2 authors
- Country: United States
- Presented by: FIYAH Literary Magazine
- First award: 2020; 6 years ago
- Most recent winner: Trang Thanh Tran (They Bloom at Night)
- Website: ignyteawards.fiyahlitmag.com

The Ignyte Award for Outstanding Novel — Young Adult is a literary award given annually as part of the Ignyte Awards.

== Winners and finalists ==
* Winners

Year	Author	Work	Ref.
2020	Hafsah Faizal*	We Hunt the Flame	
2020	Dhonielle Clayton	The Everlasting Rose	
2020	Akwaeke Emezi	Pet	
2020	Brittney Morris	Slay	
2020	Tochi Onyebuchi	War Girls	
2021	Tracy Deonn*	Legendborn	
2021	Jordan Ifueko	Raybearer	
2021	Darcie Little Badger	Elatsoe	
2021	Bethany C. Morrow	A Song Below Water	
2021	Sabaa Tahir	A Sky Beyond the Storm	
2022	Darcie Little Badger*	A Snake Falls to Earth	
2022	Nafiza Azad	The Wild Ones	
2022	Kalynn Bayron	This Poison Heart	
2022	Jordan Ifueko	Redemptor	
2022	Tiffany D. Jackson	White Smoke	
2023	Tracy Deonn*	Bloodmarked	
2023	Alechia Dow	The Kindred	
2023	Deborah Falaye	Blood Scion	
2023	Anna-Marie McLemore	Lakelore	
2023	Daniel José Older	Ballad & Dagger	
2024	Jamison Shea*	I Feed Her To the Beast and the Beast is Me	
2024	Gabi Burton	Sing Me to Sleep	
2024	Cherie Dimaline	Funeral Songs for Dying Girls	
2024	Ryan La Sala	Beholder	
2024	Brittany N. Williams	That Self-Same Metal	
2025	Sabaa Tahir*	Heir	
2025	Bethany Baptiste	The Poisons We Drink	
2025	Aislinn Brophy	Spells to Forget Us	
2025	Yoon Ha Lee	Moonstorm	
2025	Darcie Little Badger	Sheine Lende	
2026	Trang Thanh Tran*	They Bloom at Night	
2026	Channelle Desamours	Needy Little Things	
2026	Logan-Ashley Kisner	The Transition	
2026	Amber McBride	The Leaving Room	
2026	Ibi Zoboi	(S)Kin	
