= Lodestar Award for Best Young Adult Book =

Annual awards for science fiction or fantasy

- Awarded for: Best young adult science fiction or fantasy book
- Presented by: World Science Fiction Society
- First award: 2018
- Most recent winner: C. B. Lee, Coffeeshop in an Alternate Universe

The Lodestar Award for Best Young Adult Book is an award given annually to a book published for young adult readers in the field of science fiction or fantasy. The name of the award was chosen because a lodestar is "a star that guides or leads, especially in navigation, where it is the sole reliable source of light—the star that leads those in uncharted waters to safety". The nomination and selection process is administered by the World Science Fiction Society (WSFS), and the award is presented at the Hugo Award ceremony at the annual World Science Fiction Convention, or Worldcon, although it is not itself a Hugo Award.

Lodestar Award nominees and winners, using the same procedures as the Hugo Awards, are chosen by supporting or attending members of the Worldcon, and the presentation evening constitutes its central event. The final selection process is defined in the WSFS Constitution as instant-runoff voting with six finalists, except in the case of a tie. The books on the ballot are the six most-nominated by members that year, with no limit on the number of books that can be nominated. Initial nominations are made by members from January through March, while voting on the ballot of six finalists is performed roughly from April through July, depending on the dates of that year's Worldcon. Worldcons are generally held in August or early September, and are held in a different city around the world each year.

Prior to the creation of the award, unsuccessful attempts had been made to add a Best Young Adult Book or similar category to the Hugo Awards, leading to the creation of a WSFS committee in 2014 to make recommendations on the issue. The committee concluded in 2017 that opposition to the category was largely due to its nature as a type of story rather than a format, like the other categories, and proposed making it a named non-Hugo award instead. This proposal was agreed upon by the WSFS members. The award was created and named in separate amendments to the WSFS constitution, in 2017 and 2018 respectively, so it did not have a formal name in its inaugural year, and was referred to as the World Science Fiction Society Award for Best Young Adult Book.

In the 9 years the award has been given, 32 authors have had works as finalists. Nnedi Okorafor has won twice, in 2018 and 2023. Each other year has seen a different winner: the 2019 award by Tomi Adeyemi, the 2020 award by Naomi Kritzer, the 2021 award by Ursula Vernon under the alias T. Kingfisher, the 2022 award by Naomi Novik, the 2024 award by Moniquill Blackgoose, the 2025 award by Darcie Little Badger, and the 2026 award by C. B. Lee. Charlie Jane Anders, Frances Hardinge, Kritzer, Novik, Little Badger, and Vernon (as Kingfisher) have had works on the final ballot three times, and six other authors have been finalists twice.

== Winners and finalists ==
In the following table, the years correspond to the date of the ceremony, rather than when the novel was first published. Each year links to the corresponding "year in literature". Entries with a yellow background have won the award; those with a gray background are the finalists.

* Winners and joint winners

Winners and finalists
Year	Author(s)	Title	Publisher	Ref.
2018	Nnedi Okorafor*	Akata Warrior	Viking Press	
2018	Ursula Vernon (as T. Kingfisher)	Summer in Orcus	Sofawolf Press	
2018	Sarah Rees Brennan	In Other Lands	Big Mouth House	
2018	Frances Hardinge	A Skinful of Shadows	Macmillan Publishers / Harry N. Abrams	
2018	Sam J. Miller	The Art of Starving	HarperTeen	
2018	Philip Pullman	The Book of Dust: La Belle Sauvage	Alfred A. Knopf	
2019	Tomi Adeyemi*	Children of Blood and Bone	Henry Holt and Company / Macmillan Publishers	
2019	Holly Black	The Cruel Prince	Little, Brown and Company / Hot Key Books	
2019	Dhonielle Clayton	The Belles	Freeform / Gollancz	
2019	Rachel Hartman	Tess of the Road	Random House / Penguin Teen	
2019	Justina Ireland	Dread Nation	Balzer + Bray	
2019	Peadar Ó Guilín	The Invasion	David Fickling Books / Scholastic	
2020	Naomi Kritzer*	Catfishing on CatNet	Tor Teen	
2020	Frances Hardinge	Deeplight	Macmillan Publishers	
2020	Yoon Ha Lee	Dragon Pearl	Disney/Hyperion	
2020	Ursula Vernon (as T. Kingfisher)	Minor Mage	Argyll Productions	
2020	Fran Wilde	Riverland	Amulet Books	
2020	Holly Black	The Wicked King	Little, Brown and Company / Hot Key Books	
2021	Ursula Vernon (as T. Kingfisher)*	A Wizard's Guide to Defensive Baking	Argyll Productions	
2021	Aiden Thomas	Cemetery Boys	Swoon Reads	
2021	Naomi Novik	A Deadly Education	Del Rey Books	
2021	Darcie Little Badger	Elatsoe	Levine Querido	
2021	Tracy Deonn	Legendborn	Simon & Schuster Children's Publishing	
2021	Jordan Ifueko	Raybearer	Amulet Books / Hot Key Books	
2022	Naomi Novik*	The Last Graduate	Del Rey Books	
2022	Naomi Kritzer	Chaos on CatNet	Tor Teen	
2022	Xiran Jay Zhao	Iron Widow	Penguin Teen / Rock the Boat	
2022	Jordan Ifueko	Redemptor	Amulet Books / Hot Key Books	
2022	Darcie Little Badger	A Snake Falls to Earth	Levine Querido	
2022	Charlie Jane Anders	Victories Greater Than Death	Tor Teen / Titan Books	
2023	Nnedi Okorafor*	Akata Woman	Viking Books for Young Readers	
2023	Tracy Deonn	Bloodmarked	Simon & Schuster Books for Young Readers	
2023	Charlie Jane Anders	Dreams Bigger Than Heartbreak	Tor Teen / Titan Books	
2023	Naomi Novik	The Golden Enclaves	Del Rey Books	
2023	Rachel Hartman	In the Serpent's Wake	Random House Books for Young Readers	
2023	Catherynne M. Valente	Osmo Unknown and the Eightpenny Woods	Margaret K. McElderry Books	
2024	Moniquill Blackgoose*	To Shape a Dragon's Breath	Del Rey Books	
2024	P. Djèlí Clark	Abeni's Song	Starscape	
2024	Naomi Kritzer	Liberty's Daughter	Fairwood Press	
2024	Charlie Jane Anders	Promises Stronger than Darkness	Tor Teen	
2024	Garth Nix	The Sinister Booksellers of Bath	Katherine Tegen Books / Victor Gollancz Ltd / Allen & Unwin	
2024	Frances Hardinge	Unraveller	Macmillan Children's Books	
2025	Darcie Little Badger*	Sheine Lende	Levine Querido	
2025	H. A. Clarke	The Feast Makers	Erewhon	
2025	Xiran Jay Zhao	Heavenly Tyrant	Tundra Books	
2025	Jordan Ifueko	The Maid and the Crocodile	Amulet	
2025	Kamilah Cole	So Let Them Burn	Little, Brown Books for Young Readers	
2025	Yoon Ha Lee	Moonstorm (nomination withdrawn) (Note: Moonstorm was a finalist for the 2025 awards, but was withdrawn from consideration by the author in protest of the Worldcon's use of generative AI tools to vet potential program participants at the convention.)	Delacorte Press	
2026	C. B. Lee*	Coffeeshop in an Alternate Universe	Feiwel & Friends	
2026	Rachel Hartman	Among Ghosts	Random House Books for Young Readers	
2026	Margaret Owen	Holy Terrors	Holt/Hodderscape	
2026	Tracy Deonn	Oathbound	Simon & Schuster	
2026	Suzanne Collins	Sunrise on the Reaping	Scholastic	
2026	Trang Thanh Tran	They Bloom at Night	Bloomsbury Publishing	

== See also ==
- Andre Norton Award
