= Amy Unbounded =

Comic book series by Rachel Hartman

- Cover of the 2002 volume collecting issues 7-12

Publication information
- Publisher: Pughouse Press
- No. of issues: 13

Creative team
- Written by: Rachel Hartman
- Artist: Rachel Hartman

Amy Unbounded is a comic book series by Rachel Hartman that began in 1996. Amy Unbounded won the 1998 Ignatz Award for Best Minicomic.

== Background ==
Amy Unbounded is set in the fictional fantasy kingdom of Goredd and features shape-shifting dragons that are capable of assuming human form. The story follows Amy, a nine-year-old girl whom Hartman has compared to "Anne of Green Gables and Harriet the Spy" in terms of personality. The series has had two spinoffs, a prose novel entitled Seraphina and the webcomic Return of the Mad Bun. Hartman has stated that she chose to incorporate the dragons shape changing into humans because she found dragons harder to illustrate. Hartman chose to self-publish after facing rejection from traditional publishers, eventually publishing issues 7-12 of the series in a collected volume with funds received from a Xeric Grant.

== Reception ==
Reception for the series has been positive, with Publishers Weekly favorably comparing it to the writing of Laura Ingalls Wilder. Strange Horizons called it "one of the small treasures of contemporary fantasy". In 2010 Time Techland listed the comic as one of "ten comics that should run forever".

== Bibliography ==
- Belondweg Blossoming (2002)
