= Kinsale (disambiguation) =

Kinsale is a town in Ireland.

Kinsale may also refer to:

- Kinsale, Ontario
- Kinsale, Virginia
- Kinsale, an abandoned settlement in the exclusion zone of Montserrat
- Kinsale Drake (born 2000), Diné poet and playwright
