= Seraphina (novel) =

2012 fantasy adult novel by Rachel Hartman

- Davidson cover of first edition
- Author: Rachel Hartman
- Cover artist: Andrew Davidson
- Genre: Young adult fantasy novel
- Publisher: Random House
- Publication date: July 10, 2012
- Media type: Print (hardcover and electronic book) and audio-CD
- Pages: 480
- Awards: Sunburst Award, Young Adult; William C. Morris Award
- ISBN: 978-0375866562
- LC Class: PZ7.H26736Se 2012
- Followed by: Shadow Scale

Seraphina is a 2012 fantasy novel by Rachel Hartman and is her debut novel. The book was published on July 10, 2012, by Random House Publishing and was ranked at number 8 on The New York Times Best Seller list in its first week of publication. Seraphina was awarded the 2013 William C. Morris Award for the best young adult work by a debut author. Foreign language rights to the novel have been sold in twenty languages, such as Spanish. A sequel entitled Shadow Scale came out in 2015. A companion novel Tess of the Road set in the same milieu was published in 2018, followed by its own sequel, In the Serpent's Wake (2022). A prequel, Among Ghosts, was published in 2025.

== Synopsis ==
Seraphina is set in the kingdom of Goredd and follows the sixteen-year-old Seraphina, a court musician. She is drawn into a murder mystery when the Crown Prince of Goredd, Rufus, is found decapitated in a manner that insinuates that he was murdered by dragons. The murder occurs on the eve of the 40th anniversary of the signing of a treaty that ended the war between humans and dragons. Dragons can take human form but find human emotions baffling, which only lends to the continuing distrust and hatred between them and humans.

== Background ==
Hartman had initially written about the kingdom of Goredd in a graphic novel entitled Amy Unbounded. In an interview with Suvudu, Hartman stated that she had difficulty drawing dragons and that she had chosen to make them transform into humans as an "easier way" to illustrate them.

== Reception ==
Reception for Seraphina has been positive, with the book gaining starred reviews from eight review sites and being listed by the Center for Children's Books. Kirkus Reviews also praised the book, calling it "splendid". A reviewer for The Washington Post commented that Hartman was able to "infuse [the] tired trope [of fictional dragons] with fresh blood". SFX gave the novel four and half stars, citing the prose as "beautiful". The Quill & Quire also remarked that the book stands out from "standard dragon fare", with the language and music themes in the book working well with Hartman's prose. Publishers Weekly chose the book as one of its "Best New Books for the Week of July 9, 2012", saying that "there's a lot to enjoy in Hartman's debut". Reviewers for the School Library Journal praised Hartman's style as well as the narration for the audiobook.

== Awards ==
Seraphina was a finalist for the Canadian 2012 Governor General's Award in the category of Children's Text. Seraphina was shortlisted in 2013 for the Waterstones Children's Book Prize in the teen book category, and won the 2012 Cybils Award for best young adult fantasy or science fiction novel. On January 28, 2013, it also received the 2013 William C. Morris Award, awarded to best young adult book published in the US by a debut author. It was runner-up for the 2013 Crawford Award. In the UK, Seraphina placed on the longlist for the CILIP Carnegie Medal 2013, with the shortlist announced in March 2013. Seraphina also reached the finals for the 2012 Kitschies "Golden Tentacle" Award and the 2012 Andre Norton Award.

=== Sci-fi awards ===
Year	Award	Category	Result	Ref.
2012	Kitschies	Début Novel ("Golden Tentacle")	Shortlisted	
2013	Crawford Award	—	Shortlisted	
2013	Locus Award	First Novel	Nominated—4th	
2013	Nebula Award	Andre Norton Award	Shortlisted	
2013	Sunburst Award	Young Adult	Won	

=== Young adult nominations and victories ===
Year	Award	Category	Result	Ref.
2012	Cybils Award	Young Adult Fantasy / Sci-fi	Won	
2012	Governor General's Award	Children's Literature	Shortlisted	
2013	Carnegie Medal	—	Longlisted	
2013	Waterstones Children's Book Prize	Teen Novel	Shortlisted	
2013	William C. Morris Award	—	Won	
