= They Bloom at Night =

2025 novel by Trang Thanh Tran

- First edition hardcover
- Author: Trang Thanh Tran
- Cover artist: John Candell
- Language: English
- Genre: Body horror; young adult fiction; Southern Gothic; mystery fiction
- Publisher: Bloomsbury Publishing
- Publication date: March 4, 2025
- Publication place: United States
- Pages: 272
- ISBN: 9781547611119

They Bloom at Night is a young adult body horror novel by Vietnamese-American author Trang Thanh Tran. It was published by Bloomsbury Publishing by March 4, 2025. It centers a teenager whose coastal town is being overtaken by a sinister red algae bloom. An audiobook narrated by Nhi Do was released concurrently with the hardback and ebook editions.

== Background ==
Mercy is inspired by Tran's childhood home in southern Louisiana, which had a large population of Vietnamese shrimpers. The encroaching algae is a reflection of climate change.

== Synopsis ==
It has been twenty-one months since Hurricane Arlene hit the Gulf of Mexico, leaving the small coastal town of Mercy, Louisiana waterlogged, with red algae encroaching the town and mutating the wildlife. To avoid dangers in town, Vietnamese-American teenager Noon and her mother have been living in their shrimp trawler Wild Things on the edge of the Gulf of Mexico, catching and selling mutated sea creatures and looking for traces of their missing brother and father, who Noon's mother believes have been reincarnated as sea creatures. When people start disappearing at an alarming rate, Jimmy Boudreaux, business criminal and legal owner of Wild Things, believes a monster is drowning the residents. He believes that providing the Monster to the authorities could revitalize the area and bring back people and money. He demands Noon and her mother capture it, threatening to repossess their trawler. Noon returns to Mercy to investigate alongside Jimmy's daughter, a lesbian hunter named Covey who is searching for her missing mother. While investigating, Noon finds her body inexplicably changing, and struggles with processing her gender identity and a sexual assault that occurred two years earlier.

== Reception ==
The novel won an Indies Choice Book Award in the Young Adult category and a Libro.fm Bookseller Choice Award in the Young Readers category. It was shortlisted for a Barnes & Noble Young Adult Book Award and a Locus Award for Best Young Adult Novel. The audiobook edition was nominated for an Audie Award for Horror. In 2026, it was a finalist for the Lodestar Award and won the Ignyte Award for Outstanding Novel – Young Adult.

Kirkus Reviews praised the novel's sensory detail and worldbuilding, while calling Noon "complex and multifaceted". Allie Stevens of School Library Journal praised the novel's body horror and its "powerful emotional reckonings." Publishers Weekly praised its "surreal and harrowing atmosphere", but stated that its "fluid prose occasionally makes for murky, complex plotting". Siân Gaetano of Shelf Awareness praised the novel's "visceral descriptions". In her review for The Washington Post, Charlie Jane Anders praised its "razor-sharp lines" and its use of smells, itches, and sounds to create a "pervasive sense of dread". Colleen Mondor of Locus praised the novel's "forthright assessments of Mercy’s situation" and its "gorgeously written" setting, and wrote that it "really sings as the story gets darker and darker".
