= Kinsale Drake =

Diné poet from California

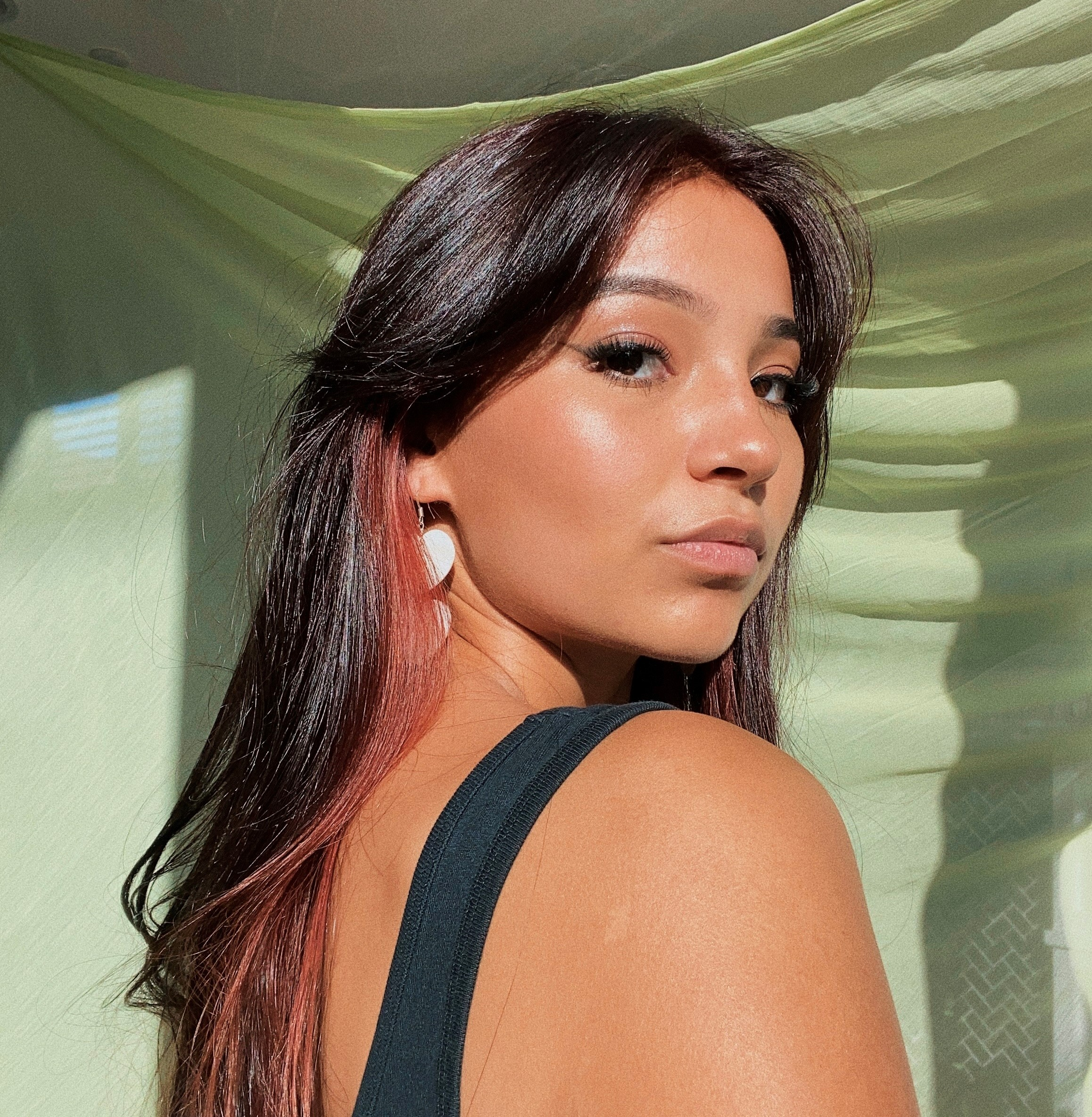
- Drake in 2023
- Born: March 4, 2000 (age 26)
- Citizenship: Navajo Nation; United States
- Education: Yale College (BA)
- Occupation: Writer
- Writing career
- Genres: Poetry, fiction
- Notable awards: National Poetry Series (2023)
- Website: kinsaledrake.com

Kinsale Drake (/kɪnˈseɪl/ kin-SAIL, born March 4, 2000) is a Native American poet, playwright, performer, and writer. Drake is Diné and a citizen of the Navajo Nation. In September 2023, Drake was one of five winners of the 2023 National Poetry Series for their debut poetry collection The Sky Was Once a Dark Blanket.

== Early life and education ==
Drake was born in Los Angeles, California. They grew up between Los Angeles and Naatsisʼáán (Navajo Mountain).

Drake earned two BAs from Yale University, in English and in Ethnicity, Race, and Migration. Their work has explored “the intersections of cultural (re)vitalization movements, Indigenous poetics, and Indigenous feminisms.”

Drake has served as a guest faculty member at the Emerging Diné Writers Institute, held at Navajo Technical University.

As of September 2024, they were working toward an MFA at Vanderbilt University where they teach as part of the program.

== Work ==
=== Writing ===
Drake's poetry often engages with their Navajo upbringing, family, and culture. They have said their grandmother has had a major impact on their work as a poet.

Drake has received several awards for their writing. In 2017, they were selected as a National Student Poet representing the West as part of the National Student Poetry Program run by the Library of Congress. While attending Yale, they received the Yale Young Native Storytellers Award for Spoken Word and Storytelling, the Academy of American Poets College Prize, and the J. Edgar Meeker Award.

Their work has appeared in venues including Poetry, Best New Poets, Poets.org, Poetry Northwest, The Slowdown, Black Warrior Review, The Adroit Journal, and Poetry Online.

In 2019, Time named Drake one of "34 People Changing How We See Our World", and in 2021 Yahoo! named them an In the Know Changemaker. They have been featured in Nylon, Time, and Indian Country Today.

Drake is also a playwright and received Yale's Young Native Playwrights Award for their play As It Has Always Been.

In November 2025, an anthology that Drake co-edited with Stacie Shannon Denetsosie and Darcie Little Badger was published. Beyond the Glittering World: An Anthology of Indigenous Feminisms and Futurisms includes work from 22 Indigenous writers.

=== Performance ===
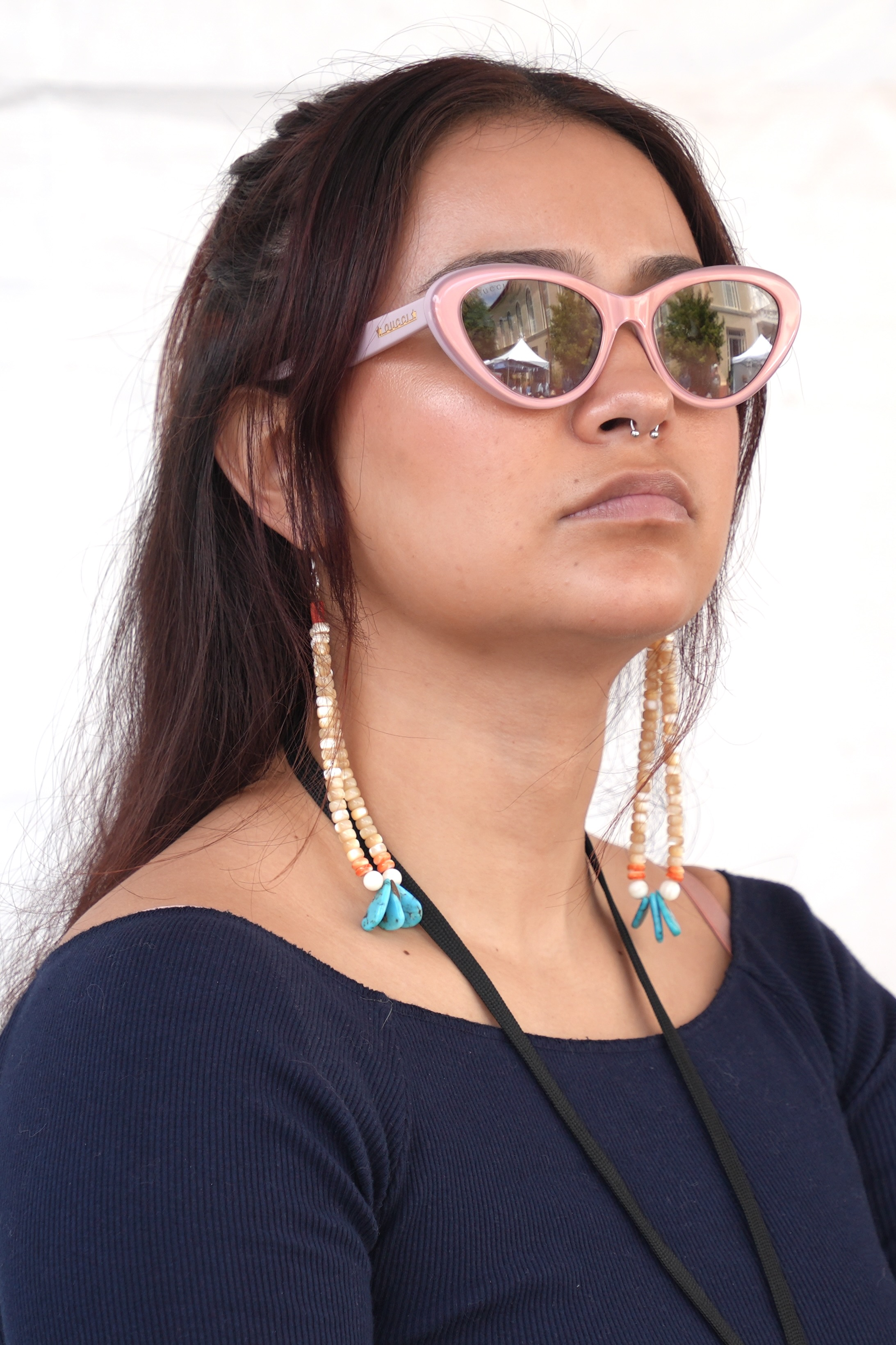
Drake in 2025

Drake narrated the audiobook versions of Darcie Little Badger's Elatsoe (2020) and A Snake Falls to Earth (2021). They have also worked as a narrator for two Rick Riordan Presents releases: Race to the Sun by Rebecca Roanhorse (2020) and The Cursed Carnival & other Calamities (2021).

In June 2023, Drake performed poetry at Carnegie Hall in New York.

=== Indigenous community ===
Drake founded NDN Girls Book Club, a literary organization that "aims to amplify Indigenous authors, support tribal libraries and bookstores, and encourage reading and writing among Native youth." In 2024, the organization distributed 10,000 books in Hopi Nation and the Navajo Nation, and undertook a similar distribution effort in Southeast Alaska in 2025 with Tlingit and Haida communities.

== Personal life ==
Drake is a member of the Drake family of Navajo Mountain. They often visited their grandmother's farm on the Utah–Arizona border. Their family comes from a traditional Navajo cultural background. Their maternal grandfather was Harold Drake Sr., a boarding school survivor who was taken from his family by police during a cultural dance and brought to Tuba City Boarding School. Drake is related to the late Buck Navajo Sr., described as the last hataałii (medicine man) of Navajo Mountain.

Drake uses she/they pronouns.

=== Influences ===
Drake has named Louise Erdrich and Leslie Marmon Silko as influential figures at the start of their career.

== Awards and recognition ==
- 2017 National Student Poet
- 2022 Young Native Playwrights Award
- 2022 Joy Harjo Poetry Award
- 2022 Indigenous Nations Poets (In-Na-Po) Inaugural Fellowship
- 2023 Ruth Lilly & Dorothy Sargent Rosenberg Poetry Fellowship Finalist
- 2023 Aspen Institute Emerging Writer Fellowship for Poetry
- 2023 Adroit Journal Prize for Poetry
