= Darcie Little Badger =

American speculative fiction writer (born 1987)

- Little Badger at Worldcon 2026
- Born: Darcie Erin Ryan; 1987 (age 38–39)
- Education: Princeton University (BA); Texas A&M University (PhD)
- Occupations: Writer; Earth scientist
- Writing career
- Genres: Speculative fiction; horror; fantasy
- Notable works: Elatsoe (2020); A Snake Falls to Earth (2021)
- Website: darcielittlebadger.com

Darcie Little Badger (formerly Darcie Erin Ryan; born 1987) is an American novelist, short story writer, and Earth scientist. She writes speculative fiction, especially horror, science fiction, and fantasy. She is a member of the Lipan Apache Tribe of Texas. Her stories often feature Apache and/or LGBTQ characters. She has described herself and been described by others as writing within the Indigenous Futurisms movement.

== Early life and education ==
Darcie Little Badger was born Darcie Erin Ryan in 1987. Her father was an English professor of Irish descent and her mother, Hermelinda Walking Woman, is the tribal administrator of the Lipan Apache Tribe of Texas. At age seven she wrote her first book, which was submitted for publication with her father's help and rejected. Throughout her childhood Little Badger moved due to her father's job, but considered Texas to be her home.

After graduating from high school in Texarkana, Texas, Little Badger adopted her current surname, as per Lipan tradition. She attended Princeton University in New Jersey, where she earned a bachelor's degree in earth science after being rejected twice from the school's creative writing program. Little Badger graduated cum laude in 2010.

She subsequently enrolled in the doctoral program in oceanography at Texas A&M University (TAMU), where she earned a PhD. She wrote her dissertation on the genomics of Karenia brevis, a species of plankton that causes toxic red tide in the Gulf of Mexico. For her research, she received a Ford Dissertation Fellowship and TAMU's Chapman Award for Graduate Student Research, both under the name Darcie Ryan.

== Scientific career ==
After graduating from Texas A&M, Little Badger took a job as an editor of scientific papers. She quit this job after selling her first novel, Elatsoe (2020), becoming a writer full-time.

== Writing career ==
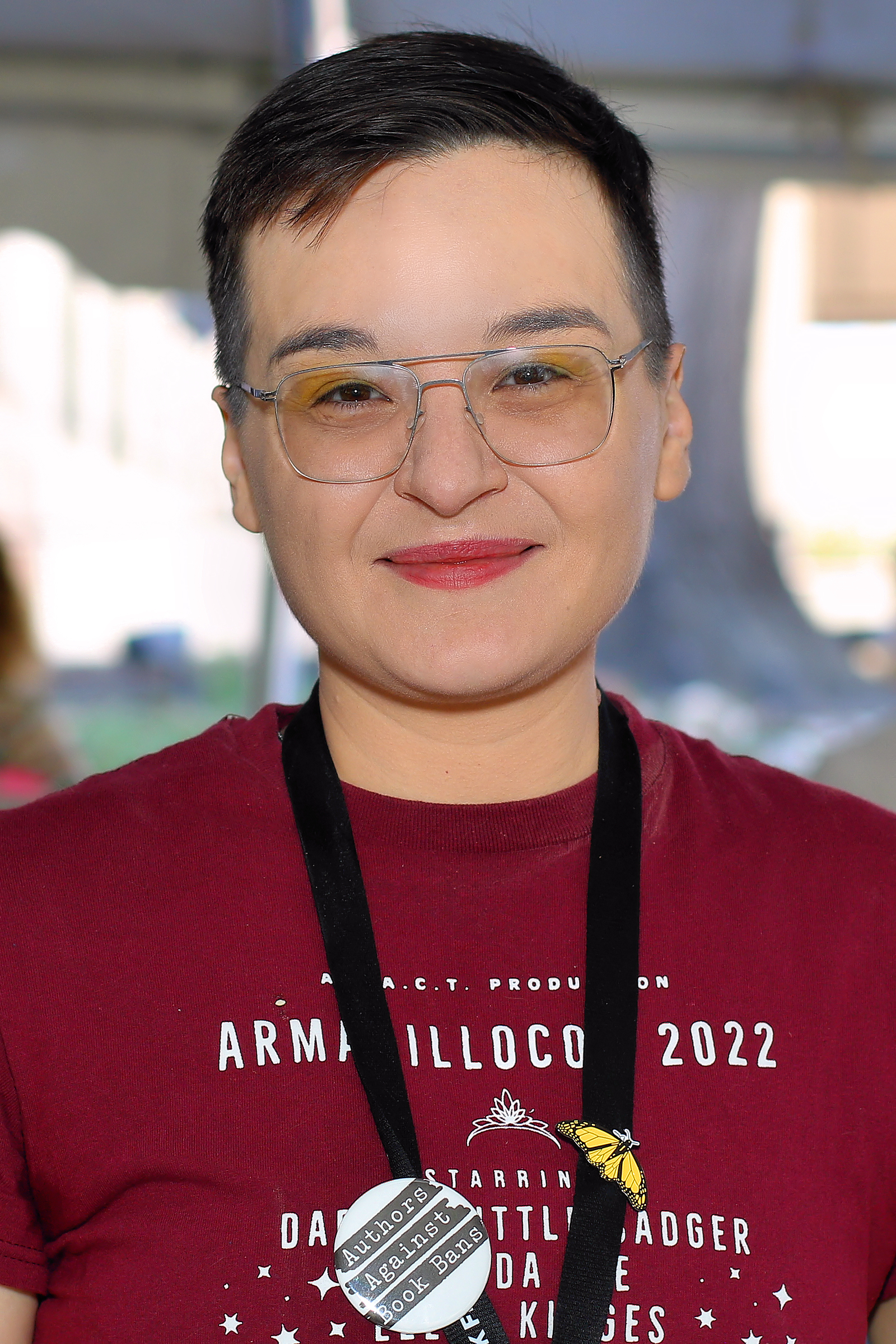
Little Badger in 2025

=== Short fiction ===
Little Badger's short fiction has appeared in a range of publications, including Strange Horizons, Fantasy Magazine, Mythic Delirium, and The Dark Magazine, among others.

Little Badger's short stories often feature Apache history and lore. For example, two Apache sisters reunite in "Whalebone Parrot" (The Dark Magazine, 2017), a Victorian horror story set in the late 19th century on an island in the Atlantic Ocean. During the conflict between their tribe and the U.S. Army, the women were orphaned and grew up together in a residential school. Similarly, in "Owl vs. the Neighborhood Watch" (Strange Horizons, 2017), she places Owl, a shapeshifting supernatural harbinger of evil from Apache lore, in the setting of contemporary Appalachia.

=== Novels ===
Little Badger began writing her debut novel, Elatsoe, in 2017. She sold the manuscript in late 2018. It was published in August 2020 by Levine Querido, and made the Indibound Young Adult bestseller list in its first week. It was a national indie bestseller for 12 weeks. The story is set in modern-day Texas; the main character, Ellie, is a seventeen-year-old asexual Lipan Apache teen. Ellie is accompanied by the ghost of her pet dog Kirby; she used her grandmothers' traditional techniques to bring him back to life. Kirby and Ellie are joined by Ellie's friend and classmate Jay as they work to solve the murder of her cousin. At the same time, they confront an enclave of vampires plaguing people near Willowbee, a mysterious town in South Texas. It was named a best book of 2020 by NPR, BookPage, Chicago Public Library, Publishers Weekly, BuzzFeed, Shelf Awareness, Tor.com, and Kirkus Reviews. Time named it one of the best fantasy books of all time.

Little Badger began writing her second novel, A Snake Falls to Earth, in early 2020. It was released in November 2021, also through Levine Querido. The story focuses on Nina, a Lipan Apache girl trying to learn about her recently deceased grandmother, who meets a cottonmouth snake named Oli. The setting shifts between near-future Texas and a fantasy dimension from which Oli originates. Climate change plays a pivotal role in the story's plot. It was named a best book of the year by the Young Adult Library Services Association, Publishers Weekly, Kirkus Reviews, Tor.com, the New York Public Library, and the Chicago Public Library. It was a national indie bestseller for 8 weeks.

She released a prequel to Elatsoe called Sheine Lende in 2024, with illustrations by Rovina Cai. The book won the 2025 Lodestar Award for Best Young Adult Book.

=== Comics ===
Little Badger and Magdalene Visaggio co-wrote Strangelands Vol. 1, illustrated by Guillermo Sana. It was published by H1 in 2019. She contributed a story about Danielle Moonstar with art by Kyle Charles to Marvel's Voices: Indigenous Voices #1 in 2020. She also wrote for the second issue of Jim Henson's The Storyteller: Shapeshifters.

== Community organizing ==
Little Badger served as a delegate to the National Congress of American Indians for the Lipan Apache Tribe of Texas. She also serves as a science advisor and is the tribe's Storyteller Laureate.

Little Badger was one of the plaintiffs in a lawsuit against the United States Department of the Interior, where the plaintiffs sought to use eagle feathers in their ceremonies without fear of prosecution, since protection after 2012 was only extended to members of federally recognized tribes by the U.S. Department of Interior. In 2014, the litigants won the case with a decision by the United States Court of Appeals for the Fifth Circuit. The court acknowledged the Lipan Apache Tribe of Texas as an American Indian Tribe with a long history in Texas. In a settlement between the plaintiffs and the Interior Department, the Interior Department accepted the American Indian status of the plaintiffs who were not members of a federally recognized tribe and granted them lifetime permits to "possess, carry, use, wear, give, loan, or exchange among other Indians, without compensation, all federally protected birds, as well as their parts or feathers" for their "Indian religious use".

On November 30, 2021, Little Badger was one of her tribe's representatives who traveled to Presidio, Texas, to be a speaker in a Lipan traditional ceremony celebrating the city of Presidio and Presidio County's transfer of a historical Lipan cemetery back to the tribe. The celebration focused on the local Presidio community's return of many sentinel stones that had been taken from Lipan gravesites throughout the years.

== Personal life ==
Little Badger is asexual and identifies as queer. She lives in San Marcos, Texas.

== Awards and honors ==
Year	Nominated work	Award	Category	Result	Ref.
2025	Sheine Lende	Lodestar Award for Best Young Adult Book	N/A	Winner	
2022	A Snake Falls to Earth	Los Angeles Times Book Prize	Young Adult Novel	Finalist	
2022	A Snake Falls to Earth	Newbery Medal	Newbery Honor	Honoree	
2022	A Snake Falls to Earth	Lodestar Award for Best Young Adult Book	N/A	Finalist	
2022	A Snake Falls to Earth	Andre Norton Award	N/A	Winner	
2022	A Snake Falls to Earth	Ursula K. Le Guin Prize	N/A	Shortlist	
2022	A Snake Falls to Earth	Ignyte Awards	Outstanding Novel – Young Adult	Winner	
2021	A Snake Falls to Earth	National Book Award	Young People's Literature	Longlist	
2022	Elatsoe	Whippoorwill Book Award	N/A	Winner	
2022	Elatsoe	American Indian Youth Literature Awards	Young Adult Honor Book	Honoree	
2021	Elatsoe	Golden Kite Award	Young Adult	Honoree	
2021	Elatsoe	Locus Award	Best First Novel	Winner	
2021	Elatsoe	Lodestar Award for Best Young Adult Book	N/A	Finalist	
2020	Elatsoe	Andre Norton Award	N/A	Finalist	
2020	Elatsoe	New England Book Award	Young Adult	Finalist	

== Published works ==
=== Novels ===
- —— (2020). Elatsoe. Levine Querido. ISBN 978-1646140053.
- —— (2021). A Snake Falls to Earth. Levine Querido. ISBN 978-1646140923.
- —— (2024). Sheine Lende. Levine Querido. ISBN 9781646144020.
- —— (2026). Children of Owl. Illustrated by Abigail Rajunov. Levine Querido. ISBN 978-1-64614-568-3.

=== Short fiction ===
Year	Title	Publication
2014	"First Ride of the Day"	—— (2014). "First Ride of the Day". Vignettes from the End of the World. Apokrupha.
2014	"Siren Son"	—— (May 2014). "Siren Song". Dark Eclipse (34).
2014	"Nkásht íí"	—— (December 15, 2014). "Nkásht íí". Strange Horizons.
2015	"The Sea Under Texas"	—— (2015). "The Sea Under Texas". Quantum Fairy Tales (11).
2015	"The Girl Turns West"	—— (Summer 2015). "The Sea Under Texas". Mirror Dance (30).
2015	"When Whales Fall"	—— (Autumn 2015). "When Whales Fall". The Colored Lens.
2016	"Né łe!"	—— (2016). "Né Łe!". Love Beyond Body, Space, and Time.
2016	"Black, Their Regalia"	—— (December 2016). "Black, Their Regalia". Fantasy Magazine (60).
2016	"Their Laughing Gal"	—— (2016). "Spirit's Tincture". Love Beyond Body, Space, and Time.
2017	"Skinwalker, Fast-Talker"	—— (2017). "Skinwalker, Fast-Talker". No Shit, There I Was.
2017	"Owl vs. The Neighborhood Watch"	—— (July 10, 2017). "Owl vs. the Neighborhood Watch". Strange Horizons.
2017	"The Whalebone Parrot"	—— (October 2017). "The Whalebone Parrot". The Dark (29).
2019	"Kelsey and the Burdened Breath"	—— (2019). "Kelsey and the Burdened Breath". New Suns. Solaris.
2019	"Robo-Liopleurodon!"	—— (2019). "Robo-Liopleurodon". The New Voices of Science Fiction. Tachyon.
2019	"Homecoming"	—— (2019). "Homecoming". Take the Mic: Fictional Stories. Scholastic Publishing.
2019	"Grace"	—— (2019). "Grace". Take the Mic: Fictional Stories. Scholastic Publishing.
2019	"Story for a Bottle"	—— (2019). "Story for a Bottle". Love After the End. Bedside Press.
2020	"Unlike Most Tides"	—— (2020). "Unlike Most Tides". Drabblecast (425).
2020	"Venom and Bite"	—— (2020). "Venom and Bite". Glitter + Ashes. Neon Hemlock Press.
2020	"The Orphan of Greenridge (Water)"	—— (2020). Adams, John Joseph; Howey, Hugh; Yant, Christine (eds.). "The Orphan of Greenridge (Water)". The Dystopia Triptych #1. Self-published.
2020	"How to Use Your Visor (Fire)"	—— (2020). Adams, John Joseph; Howey, Hugh; Yant, Christine (eds.). "How to Use Your Visor (Fire)". The Dystopia Triptych #1. Self-published.
2020	"Making Faces (Earth)"	—— (2020). Adams, John Joseph; Howey, Hugh; Yant, Christine (eds.). "Making Faces (Earth)". The Dystopia Triptych #1. Self-published.
2022	"The Dancers"	—— (2022). "The Dancers". Jim Henson's the Storyteller: Shapeshifters #2. Boom! Studios.
2023	"The Scientist's Horror Story"	(2023). The Scientist's Horror Story". Never Whistle At Night: An Indigenous Dark Fiction Anthology

=== Nonfiction ===
- "When Danger is Announced" in Nightmare Magazine #83 (August 2019)

=== As editor ===
- Mermaids Never Drown (Feiwel and Friends, 2023), with Zoraida Córdova and Natalie C. Parker
- Beyond the Glittering World (Torrey House Press, 2025), with Kinsale Drake and Shannon Stacie Denetsosie
