= Trang Thanh Tran =

Vietnamese-American horror author

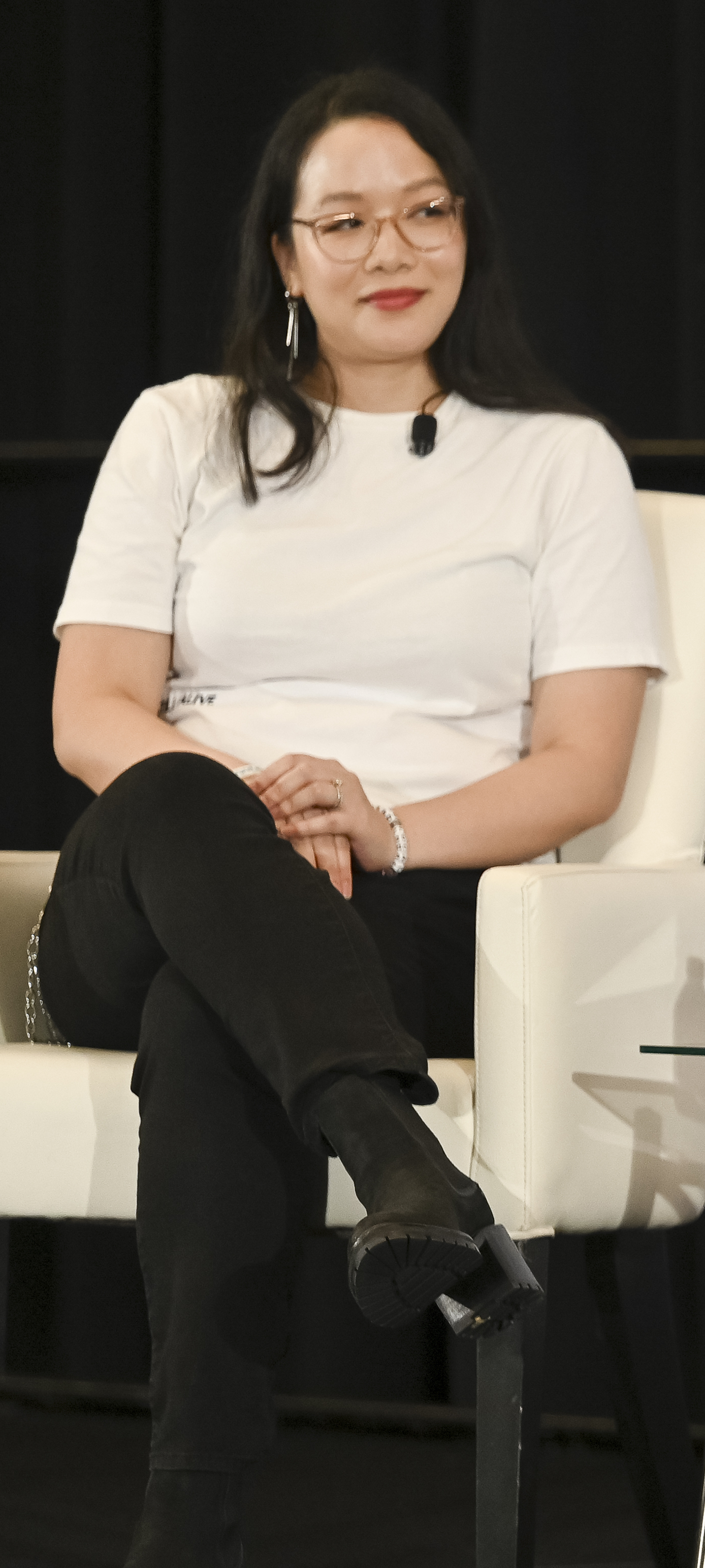
- Tran at the 2023 National Book Festival
- Occupation: Novelist
- Writing career
- Notable works: She Is a Haunting; They Bloom at Night
- Notable awards: Bram Stoker Award for Best Young Adult Novel (2023)
- Website: trangthanhtran.com

Trang Thanh Tran is a Vietnamese-American young adult horror author.

== Biography ==
Tran grew up in Philadelphia, Pennsylvania, and later in a small town in southern Louisiana.. They (Note: Tran uses the pronouns they/them and she/her. This article uses they/them for consistency.) grew up in a large family. Their parents were part of the Vietnamese boat people, and their father was a shrimper. They studied sociology and public health.

== Career ==
Tran's debut novel She Is a Haunting won the 2023 Bram Stoker Award for Best Young Adult Novel, was a finalist for the William C. Morris Award, was featured on the American Library Association Rainbow Book List, and is a New York Times bestseller. The novel follows Jade Nguyen as she visits her estranged father in Vietnam, where she is haunted by the ghost of a bride and is paralyzed by her father's haunted house every night.

Tran's second novel They Bloom at Night was released in 2025. It centers a teenager whose coastal town is being overtaken by a sinister red algae bloom. In 2026, They Bloom at Night was a finalist for the Lodestar Award. It won the 2026 Ignyte Award for Outstanding Novel – Young Adult.

Their third novel, The Summoning of Tess Pham is set to release in 2027. It will center a depressed teenager who goes to Vietnam to bury her brother, only to awaken a demon who hunts down her, her sister, and her friends.

== Personal life ==
Tran lives in Atlanta. They have two elderly cats.

== Publications ==
- She Is a Haunting (2023)
- They Bloom at Night (2025)
