= Summer in Orcus =

2016 novel by Ursula Vernon

Summer in Orcus is a 2016 portal fantasy novel by Ursula Vernon, under her pseudonym T. Kingfisher. It was first published free as a web serial; a print version was published by Sofawolf Press in 2017.

== Synopsis ==
Summer is an eleven-year-old girl seeking to escape her overprotective mother, when she meets Baba Yaga, who offers to grant her heart's desire — and then sends her to the otherworldly land of Orcus, where she must fulfill an unspecified quest.

== Inspiration ==
Vernon has stated that the novel was written as her "response to Narnia and The Phantom Tollbooth and The Neverending Story".

== Reception ==
Summer in Orcus was a finalist for the first Lodestar Award for Best Young Adult Book.

At Reactor, Judith Tarr lauded it as "perfect", with a "satisfying" ending, and posited that "what makes [the] book work" is that Summer is "not a hero, nor does she want to be, and she doesn't want to save the world". Tarr also observed that Orcus "is as American as Narnia is British".

James Nicoll described Orcus itself as "a world well into the whimsical end of the alternate universe scale", but commended Vernon for "avoid[ing] the obvious pitfall of twee absurdity, while (...) eschewing the temptation to GRRM-style grim noire," and further emphasized that "(t)he characters are neither too silly nor too loathsome; readers will care about them."
