= A Snake Falls to Earth =

2021 novel by Darcie Little Badger

- First edition cover (pub. Levine Querido)
- Author: Darcie Little Badger
- Publisher: Levine Querido
- Publication date: November 9, 2021
- Awards: Andre Norton Award (2021); Ignyte Award (2022)
- ISBN: 9781646141142

A Snake Falls to Earth is a 2021 speculative novel by Darcie Little Badger marketed to readers aged 12–18. It falls into the distinct genre of Indigenous Futurism, which includes narratives regarding "the process of 'returning to ourselves', which involves discovering how personally one is affected by colonization, discarding the emotional and psychological baggage carried from its impact, and recovering ancestral traditions in order to adapt in [a] post-Native Apocalypse world."

The novel follows two characters: Nina, a Lipan Apache girl, and Oli, a cottonmouth kid who lives in the land of spirits and monsters. Although they initially have no knowledge of one another, events in their individual worlds bring them together. Throughout the novel, Little Badger incorporates the traditional Lipan Apache storytelling structure to craft a narrative filled with monsters, magic, and the importance of family.

A Snake Falls to Earth won the 2021 Andre Norton Award and the 2022 Ignyte Award for Best Young Adult Novel. It was also a Newbery Honor book and was longlisted for the National Book Award for Young People's Literature.

== Plot ==
A Snake Falls to Earth follows the lives of Nina, a 16-year-old Lipan Apache girl, and Oli, a 15-year-old cottonmouth snake kid from the land of spirits and monsters, known as the Reflecting World. Because the human world and the Reflecting World have for centuries had only slight contact, the characters do not initially know about one another.

Nina is deeply entrenched in traditional stories and begins to learn more about the Reflecting World. Her grandmother inherited some healing powers from her Reflecting World ancestors, and her father, a bookstore owner, provides books to individuals from the Reflecting World who visit Earth in human form. Nina has also taken on the task of translating a Spanish and Lipan Apache oral story she recorded from her great-great-grandmother before she died, as well as trying to figure out why her grandmother becomes ill whenever she leaves the home.

In the Reflecting World, Oli is forced from his home and finds a space to live near the bottomless lake. There, he befriends two coyote sisters, Risk and Reign, as well as a frog named Ami. When Ami falls ill because his Earth-equivalent species is nearing extinction, Oli knows he must travel to Earth to find a cure.

When Nina and Oli eventually meet, they unite to "deal with a trickster mockingbird; an untrustworthy internet influencer; severe weather; and the threat of violent, cultish followers of a power-hungry 'King' ... who aims to be the only immortal left on Earth. They also use magic and learn why Nina's grandmother's health mysteriously declines whenever she leaves the family's land."

The novel shifts perspective between Nina and Oli in alternating chapters. Throughout the novel, the reader receives "smaller, nesting narratives, off shoots from the main storyline, as frequently seen in oral story telling traditions when peripheral characters are given a little backstory too, as they pop in and out of the main plot lines."

Key themes include "perceptions and understandings of space, time, identity, environmentalism, communication, and “the rightness of home.”

== Critical reception ==
A Snake Falls to Earth was generally well received by critics, including starred reviews from Booklist, Kirkus Reviews, and Publishers Weekly.

Kirkus referred to the novel as "a coming-of-age story that beautifully combines tradition and technology for modern audiences," and Publishers Weekly called it "fun, imaginative, and deeply immersive."

The Horn Book Magazine's Elissa Gall highlighted how "the characters’ worlds skillfully delineated and stories [are] masterfully woven together," further noting that "modern dialogue, which offers further depth to characterization, intermingles with elements of traditional storytelling and family history, creating an imaginative and multilayered work of speculative fiction."

Booklist's Mahjabeen Syed also discussed how the dialogue and perspectives added to characterization, writing, "Nina's third-person perspective is beautifully ruminative compared to Oli's faster first-person point of view." Syed also noted that "it's the writing on the whole that resonates most, singing like poetry with lyrical, literary wisdom." They ultimately called A Snake Fall to Earth "magical, stunning, and wholly original."

Writing for Locus, Alex Brown noted, "In a novel full of remarkable things, one of the most remarkable is the narrative itself," highlighting the ways Little Badger's writing reflects both traditional novel structures while also using Indigenous storytelling techniques. Brown writes, "The way Little Badger jumped between Oli and Nina, between first and third person, between mainstream and traditional narratives, is really quite something. It should feel jarring and disjointed, but it doesn't. It flows seamlessly while also letting the structure act almost like a third main character." They concluded by stating, "If Elatsoe was a ten out of ten, then A Snake Falls to Earth is a solid 11. This book could have been twice as long and I still would have begged for more. Although aimed at a young-adult audience, it has the kind of easy appeal and heartfelt tone that will entice younger kids and older adults as well."

Tor.com reviewer Mahvesh Murad wrote, "A Snake Falls to Earth is an undeniably charming story, with a variety of fully realised, relatable and fun characters, each with their own authentic voice. There is no pretension in the writing, no forced attempts at being on trend, and yet it is completely relevant" and reminds readers of "the power of stories, and community."

School Library Journal also reviewed the novel.

== Awards and honors ==
A Snake Falls to Earth was included on several "best of" lists. Chicago Public Library, Kirkus Reviews, Locus, New York Public Library, Publishers Weekly named A Snake Falls to Earth one of the best books of 2021. Booklist included it on their 2022 list of the top ten books for tweens, as well as the year's "Best Fiction for Young Adults" list. Autostraddle included A Snake Falls to Earth on their list of the "Best Queer Books of 2021."

A Snake Falls to Earth was also an Association for Library Service to Children Notable Children's Book of 2022.

Awards for A Snake Falls to Earth
| Year | Award | | Result | Ref. |
|---|---|---|---|---|
| 2021 | BSFA Award | Book for Young Readers | Finalist | |
| 2021 | Los Angeles Times Book Prize | Young Adult Literature | Finalist | |
| 2021 | National Book Award | Young People's Literature | Longlist | |
| 2021 | Nebula Award | Andre Norton Award | Winner | |
| 2022 | Cybils Award | Young Adult Speculative Fiction | Finalist | |
| 2022 | Dragon Award | Young Adult / Middle Grade Novel | Finalist | |
| 2022 | Ignyte Award | Young Adult Novel | Winner | |
| 2022 | Locus Award | Young Adult Book | Finalist | |
| 2022 | Lodestar Award | — | Finalist | |
| 2022 | Newbery Medal | — | Honor | |
| 2022 | Ursula K. Le Guin Prize | — | Shortlist | |
