= Tess of the Road =

2018 fantasy novel by Rachel Hartman

- Cover of first edition
- Author: Rachel Hartman
- Cover artist: Simon Prades
- Genre: Young adult fantasy novel
- Publisher: Random House
- Publication date: February 27, 2018
- Media type: Print (hardcover and electronic book) and audio-CD
- Pages: 520
- ISBN: 1101931280

Tess of the Road is a 2018 fantasy novel by Rachel Hartman. A companion novel to Hartman's previous books Seraphina and Shadow Scale, the novel follows the story of Tess Dombegh, a younger sister of Seraphina. While some characters from the previous novels make appearances in the book, Tess of the Road is not a direct sequel to those novels, but is the start of a new duology. It was published by Random House on February 27, 2018. Tess of the Road was nominated for the 2018 Andre Norton Award and the 2018 Lodestar Award for Best Young Adult Book. The sequel, In the Serpent's Wake, was published in 2022.

== Synopsis ==
The main character of the story Tess of the Road is Tess Dombegh. Tess is the younger sibling of Seraphina, the main character of the previous books by Rachel Hartman, along with her twin sister, Jeanne. She is (supposedly) the younger twin, and thus her role in life is to help her sister find a good husband and live a proper life. Tess is often the scapegoat of the family, and her mother often blames her for everything that goes wrong. Tess helped her sister arrange to marry Lord Richard Pfanzlig, and her sister invited her to stay with her as a nursemaid. The brother of Lord Richard, Brother Jacomo, hates Tess for reasons unbeknownst to her in the beginning, although it becomes clear that he hates her because he is a follower of St. Vitt, who damns premarital sex, and Tess had a bastard son. Tess's mother is also a follower of St. Vitt, and that is the reason she hates Tess so much. During Jeanne's wedding night, Tess got drunk and punched Brother Jacomo in the nose. She then was sent to live with Seraphina for a few days while they decided what to do with her. It is revealed at this time that Seraphina was pregnant. Seraphina hints that Tess should run away instead of joining the convent of St. Loola, which is what her mother wanted. Tess reluctantly runs away, and runs into her old friend Pathka. Pathka is a quigutl. He was a female quigutl when Tess first met him, but he changed his sex as he could likely no longer bear eggs. It is revealed that Tess saved his life, because when he was laying his egg, it got stuck, and she pulled it out. She then taught herself the quigutl language, Quootla, and became friends with Pathka. Tess decides to pose as a man to be afforded more freedom during her journey, and adopts Jacomo's name as a way to gain favor with people. She walks with Pathka, and they try to find a world serpent, which are deities that the quigutl worship. They make many stops along the way to Anathuthia, one of the world serpents. She faces trials both inner and outer, and makes many friends. In the end, her newfound philosophy of "just keeps walking" allows her the peace to move on from her trauma.

== Reception ==
Tess of the Road has been received positively by critics, and has been awarded four starred reviews. Booklist commented "First in a duology, this is a perfect example of a familiar fantasy trope being given new dimension through empathetic characters and exquisite storytelling. At first appearing bitter and self-pitying, Tess reveals compassion, courage, and resilience on her journey, which is as emotional and spiritual as it is physical." Kirkus Reviews said "Angry, bitter Tess has reason for her feelings but is not always easy to walk with, and the slow reveal of her past makes for a compelling read on the ways in which girls—in the quasi-Renaissance Goredd and also in the real world—are taught to take blame on themselves even when others are culpable. Fortunately, the Road has answers ("walk on"), and by the end Tess has faced her past and can look forward to another volume of adventure, discovery, and changing her world." Bulletin's review states that "her story is also a rousing adventure set in a richly drawn world, and the novel’s conclusion sets up a sequel that promises to have every bit as much excitement, and a healthy dose of political intrigue as well. Newcomers to Hartman’s work will be every bit as enthralled as her fans with this companion novel to Seraphina (BCCB 9/12) and Shadow Scale." Shelf Awareness writes "Fully human Tess's life has been constrained by shame and the medieval expectations of others. Her growing awareness of the inequality and unfairness she has been subjected to, along with an unfolding sense of herself and her potential, will captivate any reader. Tess's ultimately unquenchable spirit and her struggles and adventures are a delight."

Tess of the Road won the 2019 Young Adult Sunburst Award for Excellence in Canadian Literature of the Fantastic and the 2018 Cybils Award for Young Adult Speculative Fiction, and was nominated for the 2018 Andre Norton Award and the Lodestar Award for Best Young Adult Book
