= Robert Soto =

American pastor and activist

- Born: Robert Soto; 1952 (age 73–74); McAllen, Texas
- Citizenship: American
- Education: Florida Bible College (A.B.); Grace Theological Seminary (M.Div.) (M.A.)
- Occupations: Pastor; Vice Chairman of Lipan Apache Tribe of Texas
- Organization(s): McAllen Grace Brethren Church; Native American New Life Center
- Spouse: Iris Soto
- Children: 2
- Website: Robert Soto

Robert Soto is an American, religious leader, Tribal Council vice chairman, feather dancer, and activist who is a member of the Lipan Apache Tribe of Texas and serves as their council's vice chairman. He is best known for a series of successful legal challenges to oppose laws that have both restricted and criminalized eagle feather possession by Native Americans. The basis for his position is that possession of eagle feathers is an expression of Native American religious freedom.

== Personal life ==
Robert Soto was born to Alfonso Soto and Anita Acosta Soto in McAllen, Texas, the oldest of nine children with four brothers and four sisters.

He and his wife have two children.

Earning his Bachelor of Arts in Biblical Education from Florida Bible College in Orlando, Florida, Soto went on to earn his Master of Divinity (M.Div.) and his Master of Arts in Christian School administration at Grace Theological Seminary in Winona Lake, Indiana.

== Career ==
Soto serves as pastor of McAllen Grace Brethren Church and the Native American New Life Center in McAllen, Texas.

He was pastor at Grace Brethren Church. His congregation asked him to create a ministry for Native Americans because associates would not agree to attend his church due to their belief it was a "White man's church". While here, he adapted some elements of Native American culture, such as Native praise songs, for the worship of Jesus Christ. However, parishioners misinterpreted this practice, along with Soto's participation in feather dancing. Rumors began to circulate that Soto was a demon worshiper. Consequently, attendance decreased sharply, and Soto's ministry lost the building.

In addition to McAllen Grace Brethren Church, Soto was also responsible for the founding of four American Indian congregations. Three of these congregations were in Texas, one was in Florida, as well as the Son Tree Native Path. This ministry has Indigenous community membership in three countries—the United States, Canada, and Mexico.

Soto has been dancing since he was eight years old. He has been feather dancing for over 40 years, Gourd Dancing for many years (and maintains membership in the Gulf Coast Tia Piah Gourd Dance Society of Houston), Eagle Dancing, and Hoop Dancing for over 35 years. He plays the Indian Love Flute.

== Legal history ==
=== Operation Powwow ===
On March 11, 2006, members of the Lipan Apache Tribe of Texas were gathered at a powwow. The tribe allowed outsiders to observe the dance. During the dance, a stranger began asking questions about it. None of the attendees became suspicious of the questioner's behavior. It turned out the stranger was an undercover agent for the U.S. Fish and Wildlife Service, and he was investigating the Lipan Apache Tribe of Texas for possession of eagle feathers. Upon learning of the feathers' origins, the agent confiscated them and threatened to charge Soto with fines and jail time should he continue to use eagle feathers in accordance with his faith. This FBI raid was designated Operation Powwow,

The FBI agent confiscated approximately 50 of the sacred eagle feathers and threatened their owners with fines and prison. The agent claimed that Soto and his religious followers had collected the feathers in contravention of the Bald and Golden Eagle Protection Act, which criminalized the killing of eagles, the removal of their feathers from the ground, and mandated that the only place to legally receive new feathers was from the U.S. Fish and Wildlife Service-run National Eagle Repository in Denver, Colorado

Soto was subsequently charged with being in possession of eagle feathers without having a permit.

Soto, who had been given the feathers many decades earlier, was threatened with prosecution for illegal possession of the feathers. Authorities agreed to end a criminal investigation into the pastor in exchange for his signature on a voluntary abandonment of said eagle fathers. Shortly thereafter, Soto began to pursue the matter in the courts.

==== Eagle feather law ====
The bureaucratic system that governs the distribution of eagle feathers has long been a source of contention for Indigenous religious practitioners. The biggest criticism of the National Eagle Repository is that it is not available for everyone to use. The regulations set forth by the U.S. Fish & Wildlife Service limit applications for permits to American Indians who have federal recognition. Federal recognition is a slow, laborious process that can span decades, if it materializes at all. Consequently, this deprives more than 200 unrecognized tribal nations, including those which only have state recognition and terminated recognition, and a minority of non-Indian practitioners, of any legal avenue by which to obtain eagle feathers. The slow processing speed at which requests are filled has been one of the most problematic parts of this process. According to the National Eagle Repository, an order of 10 loose quality feathers will take at least six months, and the entire eagle will take over two years to fulfill. Furthermore, the fulfillment of orders for whole eagles has been tenuous due to partial decomposition by the time they are delivered.

There have been challenges from ineligible parties on the grounds that distinguishing between tribal nations with federal recognition and other Americans is a violation of the First Amendment's free exercise clause and the Religious Freedom Restoration Act. But the U.S. Court of Appeals has rejected RFRA-based challenges to eagle feather laws in the United States Court of Appeals for the Ninth Circuit in San Francisco, the United States Court of Appeals for the Eleventh Circuit in Atlanta and, to a lesser extent, the United States Court of Appeals for the Tenth Circuit in Denver, on the basis that the federal government's interests in safeguarding eagles or meeting the obligations to federally recognized tribal nations is sufficiently compelling, and that existing law is the least restrictive method of achieving these interests.

=== United States v. Erick Bonilla ===
In 2010, Soto testified on behalf of Erick Ricardo Bonilla, a 32-year-old oilfield worker and father of six who had been living in Odessa, Texas, as an undocumented immigrant since June 2004. Bonilla was facing up to two years in prison for re-entering the United States after being deported on two separate occasions, and "voluntarily returned" to Mexico on two other occasions after trying to enter the United States through El Paso, Texas. Bonilla was born in Juarez, Chihuahua, Mexico, but was also identified as a Lipan Apache descendant.

According to court documents and testimony, because of his tribal affiliation, U.S. Immigration and Customs Enforcement "approved his case" and allowed him to remain in the United States after misdemeanor arrests resulted in his internment at the Ector County Detention Center. Bonilla's Legal representation argued that he should be allowed to remain in the United States under the promise of "perpetual friendship" outlined in an arcane treaty between the Lipan Apache people and the Republic of Texas.

Bonilla was convicted of illegal re-entry in violation of 8 U.S.C. § 1326, and was sentenced to 14 months of imprisonment.

Bonilla's appeal was heard by the Fifth Circuit Court in United States v. Erick Bonilla. On August 10, 2011, the Fifth Circuit ruled against Bonilla, and upheld the sentence he received from the lower court.

=== McAllen Grace Brethren Church v. Salazar ===
Initially, the district court granted the Department of the Interior's motion for summary judgment finding that the Department's implementation of the Bald and Golden Eagle Protection Act was narrowly tailored to a compelling governmental interest.

On August 21, 2016, the Fifth Circuit held that the Department of the Interior had failed to show that a regulation preventing possession of bald and golden eagle feathers was the least restrictive means of furthering an asserted governmental interest and did not violate the Religious Freedom Restoration Act (RFRA). The 5th U.S. Circuit Court of Appeals overturned the decision and sent the case back to district court.

However, the 5th U.S. Circuit Court of Appeals found that the Department of the Interior had not given sufficient evidence that the policy of limiting permits for the possession of eagle feathers to members of federally recognized tribes survives the scrutiny required by RFRA, reversed the district court's grant of summary judgment and sent the case back to the lower court for proceedings consistent with this opinion.

The panel relied heavily on the Supreme Court's recent Hobby Lobby ruling, which found that requiring some corporations to supply contraceptives to their employees against their religious objections violates the Religious Freedom Restoration Act.

In 2016, the two sides reached an agreement that recognized the right of Soto and approximately 400 members of his congregation to use eagle feathers in observance of their faith. Part of the settlement also included the federal government agreeing to review the current laws concerning eagle feather possession and consider changes in its policies.

=== McAllen Grace Brethren Church v. Jewell ===
On June 13, 2016, the United States Court of Appeals for the Fifth Circuit ruled in favor of Soto's favor, which resulted in the return of the feathers that were seized from him and his followers.

Soto was represented by the Becket Fund for Religious Liberty, a conservative law firm best known for representing the evangelical Christian owners of Hobby Lobby in their efforts to deny their employees access to health care based on "religious freedom".

== Legacy ==
In July 2018, Soto filed a petition with the U.S. Fish and Wildlife Service asking for revision to the current legal guidelines about the religious use of federally protected bird feathers. Per the settlement agreement entered into law in 2016 following McAllen Grace Brethren Church V. Jewell, the petition was published to the government regulations website to solicit public input on the said petition. Soto's petition would implement the non-prosecution policy as a formal rule, proposes additional funding for the National Eagle Repository and increase enforcement of laws which criminalize the killing of eagles and other protected bird species.

In April 2019, in response to Soto's victory in McAllen Grace Brethren Church v. Jewell, the Department of the Interior, "published a proposed rule to end the criminalization of eagle feather possession and expand existing protections for federally-recognized Native American tribes to cover members of state-recognized tribes as well".

The proposed rule would expand the scope of Native Americans who are eligible to Native Americans who do not belong to any tribal nation and approximately 200,000 members of state-recognized tribal nations by recognizing the religious interests of these individuals, Native American churches or Native American religions as "sincere".

== See also ==
- Eagle feather law
- Bald and Golden Eagle Protection Act
- Migratory Bird Treaty Act
