= Among Ghosts =

2025 novel by Rachel Hartman

- Cover of first edition
- Author: Rachel Hartman
- Genre: Young adult fantasy novel
- Publisher: Random House
- Publication date: June 24, 2025
- Media type: Print (hardcover and electronic book) and audio-CD
- Pages: 400
- ISBN: 0593813723

Among Ghosts is a 2025 fantasy novel by Rachel Hartman. It is set in the same world as Hartman's other works, including Seraphina and Tess of the Road, but the events in the novel take place about 100 years before those books. It was published by Random House on June 24, 2025.

== Synopsis ==
Thirteen-year-old Charl and his mother, Eileen, live in muddy, unattractive St. Muckle's, in the valley of the Sowline river, an out-of-the-way location so remote that not even dragons bother attacking it. The rule in St. Muckle's is that anyone who lives for a year and a day within the city walls is free from their previous life and obligations, a law intended to help peasants on the run, but which Charl and his mother (and several of his mother's friends) have taken advantage of as well. They are in hiding from Charl's father, the abusive, bellicose Earl of Ucht, and it seems a safe bet that after seven years, he's no longer looking for them.

That bet, however, would be wrong. Strange things start happening in St. Muckle's. An unfortunate accident is quickly followed by murder, a beetle-bourne plague (helped on by a mysterious stranger), and finally a dragon attack. Three mercenaries have been sent by Earl Ucht to fetch his son home and destroy everything Eileen has worked for. With the help of an elderly nun, Mother Trude, Charl manages to escape to the Old Abbey, a ruined and thoroughly haunted monastery halfway up the mountain. But ghosts may be the least of his problems, because his father's hired assassins soon figure out he's no longer in St. Muckle's, and Mother Trude is definitely not what she seems. With help from a chorus of dead girls and the ghost of the notorious Battle Bishop, Charl must draw on all his courage and wisdom to foil his father's mercenaries and find his way back to the people he loves.

== Reception ==
School Library Journal awarded Among Ghosts a starred review, writing "Exquisite prose carves a place in readers’ hearts for the nuanced characters of St. Muckle’s as they navigate themes of power, misinformation, and the duty people have to one another and to the greater community", and labelled the book "an engrossing, thoughtful fantasy on the human condition—with dragons." Kirkus Reviews claimed "The setting and backstory are richly developed, and though the novel is set in the world of Hartman’s Seraphina series, no knowledge of those works is needed."
