= Moniquill Blackgoose =

American author of fantasy novels

- Occupation: Novelist
- Writing career
- Language: English
- Genre: Fantasy
- Notable work: To Shape a Dragon's Breath
- Notable awards: 2023 Andre Norton Award; 2024 Lodestar Award
- Website: moniquill.com

Moniquill Blackgoose is an American fantasy novelist. She is best known for her 2023 young adult fantasy novel To Shape a Dragon's Breath, which won the 2023 Andre Norton Award and 2024 Lodestar Award.

== Career ==
Her 2023 fantasy novel To Shape a Dragon's Breath, the first book in a planned trilogy, won the Lodestar and Andre Norton awards. The trilogy follows Anequs, who leaves her community (inspired by "northeast coastal woodland" Indigenous communities) to attend a dragon-riding school run by Viking colonizers. The trilogy's second book, To Ride a Rising Storm, was published in January 2026.

Blackgoose has named some of her literary inspirations as Mary Shelley, Jane Austen, Ursula Le Guin, Octavia Butler, Anne McCaffrey, Naomi Novik, and Terry Pratchett.

== Personal life ==
She is an enrolled member of the Seaconke Wampanoag Tribe and says she is a descendant of Ousamequin Massasoit.

== Bibliography ==
Books of Nampeshiweisit

- — (9 May 2023). To Shape a Dragon's Breath. Del Rey Books. ISBN 9780593498286.
- — (27 January 2026). To Ride a Rising Storm. Del Rey Books. ISBN 9780593498309.
