= To Shape a Dragon's Breath =

2023 young adult fantasy novel by Moniquill Blackgoose

- Author: Moniquill Blackgoose
- Language: English
- Series: The Books of Nampeshiweisit
- Release number: 1
- Genre: Fantasy
- Publisher: Del Rey Books
- Publication date: 9 May 2023
- Publication place: United States
- Awards: 2023 Andre Norton Award; 2024 Lodestar Award
- ISBN: 9780593498286
- Preceded by: To Ride a Rising Storm

To Shape a Dragon's Breath is a 2023 young adult fantasy novel by Moniquill Blackgoose. It tells the story of Anequs, a young Indigenous woman who becomes a dragon rider. The novel won the 2023 Andre Norton Award and 2024 Lodestar Award.

== Plot ==
Anequs is a young Indigenous woman, also called a "nackie", living on Masquapaug. She finds a dragon's egg and brings it to her village. Native dragons, called Nampeshiwe, were thought to be extinct. When the egg hatches, Anequs bonds to the hatchling, which is named Kasaqua. Her people revere her as a Nampeshiweisit, a person with a special human-dragon bond.

Frau Kuiper, a dragoneer and member of the Anglish ethnic group, arrives on Masquapaug. The Anglish have colonized Masquapaug and its neighboring territories. Anequs is forced to enroll in a school for dragon riders, despite Anglish prejudices.

She meets Theod Knecht, an orphan and the only other Indigenous student at the academy. She also meets Liberty, a maid; Sander Jansen, an autistic student; and Marta Hagan, the only other female student. Anequs's initial days at the academy are uncomfortable as she confronts prejudice about her culture and learns Anglish customs. She strikes a student, Ivar Stafn, when he makes lewd comments about her. Stafn's father writes a newspaper article criticizing the academy and the presence of both Anequs and Theod. Frau Kuiper arranges interviews to defend her students.

Anequs attends a ball, where she dances with Theod. She tears her dress, and Liberty takes her to a private room to mend it. Anequs kisses Liberty. When they return to the school, Liberty explains that they cannot pursue a relationship due to Anglish laws against same-sex relationships. Liberty promises to visit Masquapaug when her indenture is paid off.

After the publication of her interview, professor Tindra Brahe invites Anequs to her estate. She meets a group of anthropologists including Frau Mølgaard. Anequs attempts to correct their misunderstandings about her culture, with limited success.

Anequs returns to Masquapaug to visit her family. She realizes that her people’s traditional dances have preserved information about shaping dragons' breath, which is the hardest subject for her at school. Dragons have the ability to break substances into their constituent atoms; a dragoneer can control this through the skill of skiltacraft. Anequs must master this subject in order to graduate from the academy.

After her exams, Aneques and Theod go to Masquapaug for the holiday season. Anequs introduces Theod to her father, who knew his parents. They were executed for rebellion against the Anglish, resulting in Theod becoming a ward of the state. Theod reunites with his surviving family members. Anequs shares the information about the knowledge preserved in dances. Theod kisses her.

Anequs and Theod visit a confederation of Indigenous people on the mainland, where their photograph is taken. Anequs receives a threatening letter. She and Theod flee back to the school, fearing that their presence will endanger Masquapaug. Frau Kuiper berates them for visiting the confederation without permission; she confines them to the academy until she can improve their social reputations. Anequs is invited to a spring celebration. She invites her siblings and several others, surprising the Anglish guests with a large number of Indigenous attendees. Photographs of the party appear in a local newspaper, sparking racism. Several nackies are massacred. Anequs and Theod are summoned before the jarl, the Anglish leader.

The jarl discusses recent events with his ministers. He is angered about the treatment of nackie citizens and criticized his ministers for neglecting them. One of these ministers Arjan Stafn, the father of the student whom Anequs slapped. The jarl expresses support for Anequs and Theod and ends the council. At a luncheon with the jarl, one of Stafn's underlings shoots both Anequs and the jarl. Kasaqua kills the gunman. Anequs and Kasaqua are declared heroes for foiling the assassination attempt.

Anequs passes her final examination of the year. She and Theod return to Masquapaug.

== Reception and awards ==
Writing for Grimdark Magazine, Brigid Flanagan wrote that the author utilizes fantasy literature tropes in new ways, praising the author as someone who "pokes, prods, and questions the genre... [The storytelling] encourages growth over stagnation." Flanagan stated that the characters were the heart of the story; the reviewer praised the characters of Anequs and Theod in particular. The review concluded that "Blackgoose’s writing is easy to love: cutthroat, smooth, and reminds me of a story being told over an open fire."

Liz Bourke of Locus wrote that the novel "sets itself in a context defined by colonialism, and the relationship between coloniser and those that they have colonised." Bourke stated that the novel follows the well-known trope of the boarding school novel. Blackgoose's story innovates on this motif by using "the social microcosm of the school world to focus on the issue of assimilation and resistance." Bourke noted that more focus on the Masquisit people outside of Anglish contexts would have made for stronger worldbuilding, but felt that the novel was "tensely explosive and deftly done."

Aigner Loren Wilson reviewed the novel for Lightspeed Magazine, stating that it is "awash in themes of colonization and erasure." Wilson also praised the depth of the worldbuilding, stating that it felt "like I was joining characters and a world that existed without me."

Year	Award	Category	Result	Ref.
2023	Nebula Award	Andre Norton Award	Won	
2024	British Fantasy Award	Sydney J. Bounds Award for Best Newcomer	Shortlisted	
2024	Compton Crook Award	—	Finalist	
2024	Ignyte Award	Adult Novel	Finalist	
2024	Locus Award	Fantasy Novel	Finalist	
2024	Lodestar Award	—	Won	
