= Lipan Apache Tribe of Texas =

State-recognized tribe in Texas, United States

- Named after: Lipan Apache people, State of Texas
- Formation: Incorporated in 2007
- Type: Nonprofit organization; Native American tribe
- Tax ID no.: US Texas TIN 13311748407; EIN 33-1174840
- Legal status: active
- Purpose: To promote and preserve the cultural, social, educational, spiritual, linguistic, economic, health, and traditional needs
- Location: McAllen, Texas, United States
- Official language: English
- Website: lipanapache.org

The Lipan Apache Tribe of Texas is a state-recognized tribe and nonprofit organization in Texas. Members of the tribe descend from the Lipan Apache, a Southern Athabaskan Indigenous people. The Lipan Apache Tribe of Texas is headquartered in McAllen, Texas.

The Lipan Apache Tribe of Texas incorporated as a non-profit in 2007. In a lawsuit against the Department of the Interior (DOI) initiated by a Lipan tribe member, a ruling by the U.S. Court of Appeals for the Fifth Circuit resulted in a settlement with the DOI, which granted over 400 Native American plaintiffs access to eagle feathers. The City of Presidio, Texas, and County of Presidio Texas transferred a historic Lipan Apache cemetery back to the Tribe. The Lipan Apache Tribe of Texas attend the yearly Apache Alliance summit meetings.

The Lipan Apache Tribe of Texas is not a federally recognized American Indian tribe. State recognition can take different forms that carry more or less legal weight, including state law recognition, administrative recognition, executive recognition, or legislative recognition. In lieu of any formal process, the Texas government has recognized the Tribe by concurrent resolution, a type of legislative recognition which is official but does not carry the force of law.

== Organizations ==
The Lipan Apache Tribe of Texas, Inc., became a 501(c)(3) nonprofit organization in 2007. It is based in McAllen, Texas.

Their subject areas are arts, cultural awareness; education, agriculture, fishing, forestry, and community and economic development . In 2013, the organization held $10,013 in assets.

Bernard F. Barcena Jr. is the registered agent of this tribe.

Officers of the organization include:

- Director and agent: Bernard F. Barcena Jr.
- Director: Robert Soto
- Officer: Erika Sauseda
- Officer: Juan S. Garcia

The Lipan Apache Tribe Cemetery Association, another 501(c)(3) nonprofit organization, was registered in 2023. Bernard F. Barcena of San Antonio is also the registered agent of this organization.

== Recognition ==
On March 18, 2009, the Texas House and Senate passed congratulatory resolutions recognizing the Lipan Apache Tribe of Tribe of Texas as "the present-day incarnation of the clans, bands, and divisions historically known as the Lipan Apaches, who have lived in Texas and northern Mexico for 300 years" and commending the people of this Tribe for their contributions to the state. The Lipan Apache Tribe of Texas sent a letter of intent to file a petition for federal recognition on February 22, 2011, though it has yet to do so.

In 2019, the State of Texas 86th Legislature adopted concurrent resolutions, Senate Concurrent Resolution No. 61 (SCR 61) and House Concurrent Resolution No. 171 (HCR 171), providing non-legal recognition of the tribe. The Senate, House, and the Governor signed each concurrent resolution.

There are alternative forms and means for States to recognize tribes, including by state law and by legislation. Texas has no legal mechanism to recognize tribes, but concurrent legislative resolutions are a common form of non-legal state recognition. Such resolutions can serve as a means of establishing an official relationship between the State and a tribe or tribal organization, even though they do not carry the same weight as other forms of recognition.

State senator Hinojosa introduced Texas SB 274 in January 2021 and SB 231 in November 2022 to formalize the tribe's legal recognition in the state. The bills died in committee.

== Court case ==
In August 2014, after nine years of litigation by Robert Soto (Vice-chairman of the Lipan Apache Tribe of Texas) and other plaintiffs against the U.S. Department of Interior (DOI), the Fifth Circuit U.S. Court of Appeals found that the seizure of 50 eagle feathers during a 2006 Lipan Apache pow wow violated Robert Soto's rights as a "sincere adherent to an American Indian religion" under the Religious Freedom Restoration Act (RFRA) of 1993. They concluded that Congress did not specifically aim to safeguard the religious rights solely of federally recognized tribe members.

The Court accepted that Soto was "without dispute an [American] Indian" and a member of the Lipan Apache Tribe acknowledged to have "long historical roots" in Texas and who had a history of "government-to-government" relationships with the Republic of Texas, State of Texas, and the United States. The opinion was limited only to "Soto's RFRA claim based on his and his tribe's status". The Court remanded to the lower district court for proceedings consistent with their opinion, and the case was cabined to "Native American co-religionists" (referring to the "religious practices of real Native Americans").

The DOI and the plaintiffs settled the case on June 3, 2016. Through the settlement, the DOI granted lifetime permits to over 400 Native American plaintiffs who were not members of federally recognized tribes to "possess, carry, use, wear, give, loan, or exchange among other Indians, without compensation, all federally protected birds, as well as their parts or feathers" for their "Indian religious use," in accordance to "the terms set forth in the DOI's February 5, 1975 'Morton Policy'". The case was officially closed on February 17, 2017.

== Cemetery ==
In 2021, officials in Presidio and Presidio County, Texas, transferred a late 18th- and 19th-century cemetery, Cementerio del Barrio de los Lipanes, to the Lipan Apache Tribe of Texas. The Lipan Apache Tribe of Texas partnered with the Big Bend Conservation Alliance to protect and study the site in the Lipan Apache Cemetery project. The project was funded in part by the Mellon Foundation, which supported the project with a grant of $650,000 to be used to complete the protective structure and to install interpretive signage at the site, as well as to support a study to help understand the needs of Indigenous peoples in West Texas.

The architect firm MASS Design Group designed the boundary structure, to help protect and delineate the burial site. MASS is known for building architecture that "promotes justice and human dignity," such as the National Memorial for Peace and Justice in Montgomery, Alabama, a memorial to victims of lynching nationwide. The Lipan Apache Cemetery project was marked as completed on March 23, 2024.

== Activities ==
The Lipan Apache Tribe of Texas hosts two annual powwows in Alton, Texas. The tribe is a member of the National Congress of American Indians (NCAI). A member of the Lipan Apache Tribe of Texas, Gonzo Flores, served as Southern Plains Vice-President of the NCAI. He was succeeded by Reggie Wassana (Cheyenne and Arapaho Tribes).

The Lipan Apache Tribe of Texas attend the yearly Apache Alliance summit meetings, alongside federally recognized Apache tribes such as the San Carlos Apache Tribe and the Jicarilla Apache Tribe. They have support from two federally recognized Apache tribal leaders who attended the Apache Alliance meetings, former Chairwoman Gwendena-Lee Gatewood of the White Mountain Apache Tribe (Apache Alliance meeting, 2019) and Chairman Terry Rambler of the San Carlos Apache Tribe (Apache Alliance meeting, 2021).

== Notable members ==
- Darcie Little Badger, novelist, oceanographer
- Robert Soto, pastor, powwow dancer

== See also ==
- Mescalero Apache Tribe of the Mescalero Reservation
