= Jordan Ifueko =

Nigerian American writer (born 1993)

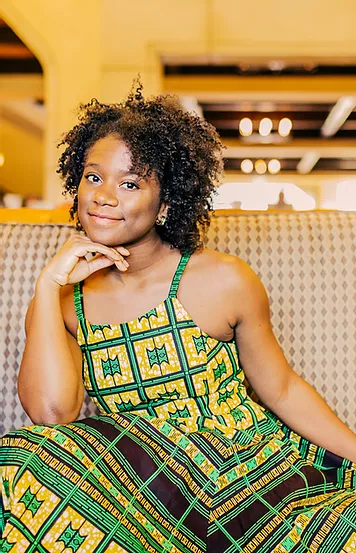
- Jordan Ifueko in 2020
- Born: August 16, 1993 (age 33); Southern California, U.S.
- Education: George Fox University
- Occupation: Writer
- Writing career
- Period: 2019-Present
- Genre: Fantasy
- Notable works: Raybearer, Redemptor
- Website: www.jordanifueko.com

Jordan Ifueko (born August 16, 1993) is a Nigerian American writer of fantasy and young adult fiction. She is best known for her novel Raybearer, which became a New York Times bestseller, and its sequel, Redemptor. Her third novel set in the world of Raybearer, The Maid and the Crocodile, was released August 2024. She also writes short stories, which have been published in Strange Horizons.

== Early life ==
Jordan Ifueko was born in Southern California to two Nigerian parents who migrated to the United States; her mother is from the Yoruba ethnicity while her father is from the Bini ethnicity. Ifueko stated she grew up listening to West African folktales narrated by her mother. She was home schooled by her parents and attended George Fox University in Oregon. She is married and lives in Atlanta with her family.

== Career ==
As a teenager in 2008, Ifueko wrote Jane Austen inspired Neopets fanfiction that was serialized in the Neopets in-game newspaper, The Neopian Times. Ifueko's debut novel Raybearer, inspired partly by her West African heritage and other world cultures, was published on August 18, 2020, by Abrams Books, and became a New York Times bestseller. It was nominated for the Andre Norton Award, the Ignyte Award for Best Young Adult Novel and the Goodreads Choice Award for best Debut Novel and best Young Adult Fantasy & Science Fiction. The novel was honoured as one of the American Library Association's (ALA) Amazing Audiobooks for Young Adults and ALA Top Ten Best Fiction for Young Adults. It was followed by a sequel, Redemptor, published in 2021 which was nominated for Ignyte Awards, Lodestar Award and Andre Norton Award.

In September 2021, it was announced that Netflix was in the development phase of adapting Raybearer into a television series, under a new overall deal with Gina Atwater, with Sugar23 and Macro Television Studios producing.

In 2024, Ifueko announced a new book, The Maid and the Crocodile, a standalone fantasy set in the same world as Raybearer. The book was published on August 13, 2024.

=== Other works ===
In July 2022, Marvel Comics announced that Ifueko would be writing a new Moon Girl & Devil Dinosaur comic, drawn by Alba Glez. It was published in December of the same year.

== Bibliography ==
=== Novels ===
- Raybearer, Amulet Books (2020)
- Redemptor, Amulet Books (2021)
- The Maid and the Crocodile, Amulet Books (2024)
