= We Hunt the Flame =

Novel by Hafsah Faizal

- Author: Hafsah Faizal
- Language: English
- Genre: Young adult
- Publisher: Farrar, Straus & Giroux
- Publication date: May 2019
- Publication place: United States
- Media type: Print

We Hunt the Flame is a 2019 young adult fantasy romance novel written by Hafsah Faizal. It is the first book of the Sands of Arawiya duology, followed by We Free the Stars in January 2021.

== Development ==
Hafsah Faizal wrote four other manuscripts before starting the first draft of We Hunt the Flame. She found her literary agent through the Twitter book pitch contest #DVPit, finishing up the first draft of what would ultimately become We Hunt the Flame just before the contest started. Faizal first got the idea to write the novel at age 17, when she first came into contact with the young adult novel scene, due to being a book blogger. Hafsah Faizal was inspired by The Hunger Games and The Lord of the Rings, asking herself the question "what if the games were set in a fantasy world?" and using that as the basis for her story.

Faizal reports during her writing process, she began to sketch a map and found that the map closely represented Arabia and decided to write the book in a setting that was more familiar to her. Faizal set the story in a world reminiscent of ancient Arabia, avoiding ties to South Asian cultures that she states are often wrongfully entwined with stories about the Middle East.

== Synopsis ==
Inspired by ancient Arabia, We Hunt the Flame tells the story of Zafira, a legendary hunter who disguises herself as a man in order to travel into a dangerous forest to feed her people. The story also follows Nasir, the crown prince who acts as an assassin and is kept on a tight leash by his father. Both are sent on a mission to retrieve an ancient artifact, but while Zafira is retrieving it to restore magic to her people, Nasir is sent by his father to retrieve the object and kill the legendary hunter who is there to retrieve it. As their journey unfolds, an ancient evil emerges and the artifact they seek may pose a greater threat than they realize.

== Reception ==
We Hunt the Flame was published by Farrar, Straus & Giroux in May 2019 and debuted on the New York Times bestseller list, at #5. It debuted to favorable reviews, earning a star from Booklist, School Library Journal, and the Bulletin of the Center for Children's Books.

In February 2021, it was reported that STXtv was developing a television adaptation of the novel with Faizal as executive producer.
