= Tracy Deonn =

American novelist

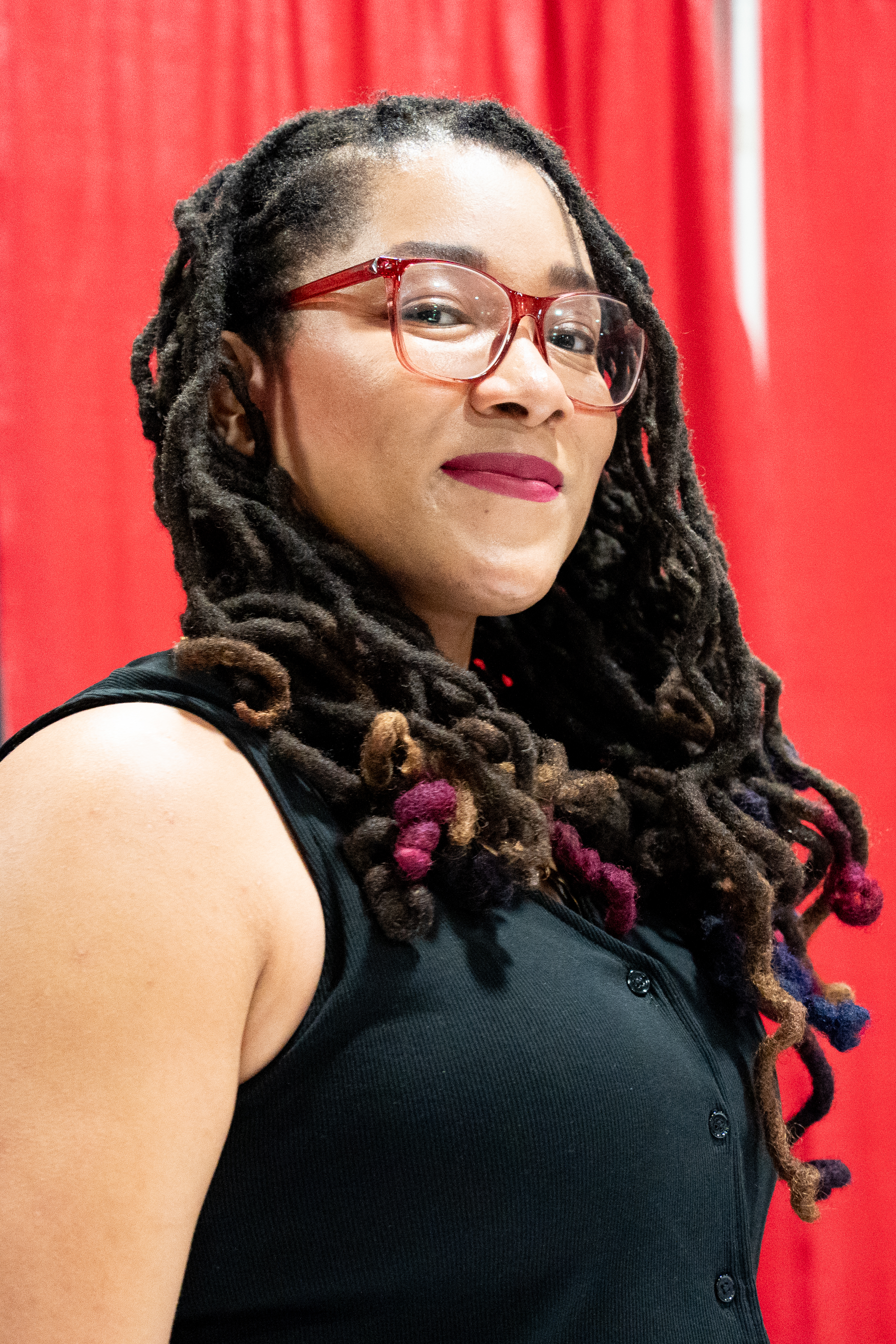
- Deonn at the National Book Festival 2025
- Born: United States
- Education: University of North Carolina at Chapel Hill
- Occupation: Author
- Writing career
- Language: English
- Years active: 2020–present
- Genres: Young Adult, Fantasy, Contemporary
- Notable works: Legendborn; Bloodmarked; Oathbound
- Website: tracydeonn.com

Tracy Deonn is an American author. Her debut novel Legendborn (2020) was a New York Times bestseller and received a Coretta Scott King–John Steptoe Award for New Talent and the 2021 Ignyte Award for Best Young Adult Novel. The sequel novel Bloodmarked was published in 2022 and also became a #1 New York Times bestseller.

== Early life and education ==
Deonn was raised in central North Carolina. As a child, she and her mother were fans of Star Wars, Star Trek, and science fiction and fantasy stories. However, she notes, "Growing up in North Carolina, there would be coursework as elementary and middle school, like, tell where your family came from, and this assumption that there was a European origin. And so, students could come to class and be like my family, way back when, they came from France or they came from Scotland. And for the Black American students, this was just this horrifying, sort of traumatic, school assignment that white instructors never really thought about how painful that was." At age 9, Deonn wrote her first short story, and her mother had it copyrighted.

She attended the University of North Carolina at Chapel Hill (UNC), graduating with a bachelor and master's degree in communication and performance studies. While there, she was a member of the fraternity of St. Anthony Hall.

Her mother died in 2008, soon after Deonn graduated from UNC. Although she was accepted into the Ph.D. program at UNC, she decided to turn down the spot. Instead, Deonn spent a summer doing yoga and exploring San Francisco.

== Career ==
Deonn returned to Chapel Hill and worked for the PlayMakers Repertory Company. She also taught undergraduates at the UNC Communications Department. Deonn has also worked in video game production and K-12 education.

After her mother's death, Deonn did not write prose for ten years. In 2018, she wrote an essay, "Black Girl, Becoming", that was published in the book, Our Stories, Our Voices. This led to Simon & Schuster editor Liesa Abrams contacting Deonn to express interest in any YA fiction that Deonn might write. Deonn followed up by sending her unfinished novel and was then encouraged by Abrams to find an agent.

Deonn was also a contributor in the 40th anniversary The Empire Strikes Back anthology, From a Certain Point of View. She was a co-writer and consulting producer of the 2019 Star Wars fandom Syfy channel docu-series Looking for Leia and was featured in the series as an expert.

She is in the process of developing a trilogy of Legendborn novels. Deonn has said she feels the challenge and obligation as a Black writer, stating, "I think as a writer I need to be able to—I want to be able to—rep my community well, but it isn't possible to represent that whole population. All you can do is represent yourself and your own experiences. But that pressure is there and it's hard to juggle."

=== Legendborn ===
Her debut novel Legendborn, a fantasy young adult book, was released in September 2020 by Simon & Schuster/McElderry Books. It was nominated for a Locus Award for Best Young Adult Book and a Lodestar Award for Best Young Adult Book in 2021. Deonn drew inspiration from African-American folk magic and tied them together with her own experiences and family history. In particular, she employed themes present in retellings of the legend of King Arthur. In a review for Tor.com, Alex Brown writes, "Legendborn is an intoxicating mix of Southern Black traditions, the King Arthur mythos, and teenage melodrama. Tracy Deonn delves into age-old tropes and twists them into something bigger and better." Kirkus Reviews writes, "Representation of actualized, strong queer characters is organic, not forced, and so are textual conversations around emotional wellness and intergenerational trauma."

For Legendborn, Deonn won a Coretta Scott King–John Steptoe Award for New Talent from the American Library Association Book and Media Awards. She says, "Winning the Steptoe feels like a huge win not just for me and this book, but for fantasy as a genre and Black American fantasy in particular. Deonn has stated that one of her inspirations for Legendborn was her "own grief journey after the passing of my mother saying, "We often look for stories in loss, and Legendborn is part of the story I told myself." She has also described Susan Cooper as a literary influence.

=== Bloodmarked ===
In 2022, the sequel to Legendborn, Bloodmarked, was published. In a review for USA Today, Felecia Wellington Radel described the book as "full of Black Girl Magic" and writes, "Bloodmarked excels in pushing against young-adult fantasy and hero's journey storytelling structures while also pushing the action-adventure forward, introducing even more lore and legend (and some modern Welsh language lessons, too), but not dawdling too much on the path to the next installment."

In a review for Tor.com, Alex Brown writes, "The racial politics Tracy Deonn explores in Bloodmarked is just as visceral the second time around as it was the first" and "This book in particular digs into the messiness of intergenerational responses to trauma and racial violence." Kirkus Reviews described the book as "A worthy successor to an explosive debut." It debuted at #1 on the New York Times bestseller list for Young Adult Hardcover books in 2022.

== Publications ==
=== Novels ===
- Deonn, Tracy (2020). Legendborn (Legendborn Cycle #1). Simon & Schuster/McElderry Books. ISBN 978-1534441606.
- Deonn, Tracy (2022). Bloodmarked (Legendborn Cycle #2). Simon & Schuster. ISBN 978-1534441637.
- Deonn, Tracy (2025). Oathbound (Legendborn Cycle #3). Simon & Schuster. ISBN 978-1665979665.

=== Anthologies ===
- "Black Girl, Becoming". Our Stories, Our Voices: 21 YA Authors Get Real About Injustice, Empowerment, and Growing Up Female in America. Simon & Schuster. 2018. ISBN 978-1534409002.
- "Vergence". From a Certain Point of View: The Empire Strikes Back. Del Rey. 2020. ISBN 978-0593157749.
- "The Emperor and the Eversong (A reimagining of "The Nightingale")". At Midnight: 15 Beloved Fairy Tales Reimagined. Flatiron Books. 2022. ISBN 978-1250806024.
- "Catalyst Rising". Cool. Awkward. Black. Viking. 2023. ISBN 9780593525098
