= Redemptor =

2021 novel by Jordan Ifueko

- First edition
- Author: Jordan Ifueko
- Language: English
- Series: Raybearer #2
- Genres: Young adult, Fantasy
- Publisher: Abrams Books
- Publication date: August 27, 2021
- Publication place: United States
- Preceded by: Raybearer

Redemptor is a 2021 young adult fantasy novel by Nigerian American writer Jordan Ifueko, published on August 17, 2021, by Abrams Books.

It is the sequel to Raybearer and the last book in the Raybearer duology.

== Plot ==
Following the events of the previous book, Empress Tarisai forms her own council of eleven connected by the Ray and works as the High Lady Judge alongside Emperor Ekundayo while also trying to fulfill her promise of sacrificing herself to the Abiku by going to the Underworld to stop the death of 200 Redemptors as the Ojiji, spirits of dead Redemptor children begin to haunt her.

Meanwhile, an activist called the Crocodile is turning the mind of peasants and miners away from the empire's noble class, which has thus far abused their authority under the empire. Tarisai must fight to rectify the past crimes of the empire while retaining her sanity.

== Reception ==
The book received generally positive receptions from reviewers and readers. A review from Kirkus Reviews called the novel “A strong and worthy successor that showcases the skill of a master worldbuilder.” A review from NPR states that “Redemptor continues the breathtakingly beautiful tale of a young woman who is being torn apart by the responsibilities of being both empress and sacrifice”.

Alex Brown in a review for Locus stated that “this is a series begging to be reread. Jordan Ifueko’s West African-influenced duology is one of the best YA fantasies I’ve read in a long time”. Buzzfeed named Redemptor one of the best books of August 2021, saying it was "[i]mmersive and gorgeously written."

== Awards and Recognitions ==
- Ignyte Awards for Best Novel for Young Adult Fiction, shortlisted (2022)
- Lodestar Award for Best Young Adult Book, finalist
- BSFA Award for Best Book for Young Readers, nominee (2021)
- Andre Norton Award, nominee (2022)
