= Hafsah Faizal =

American author

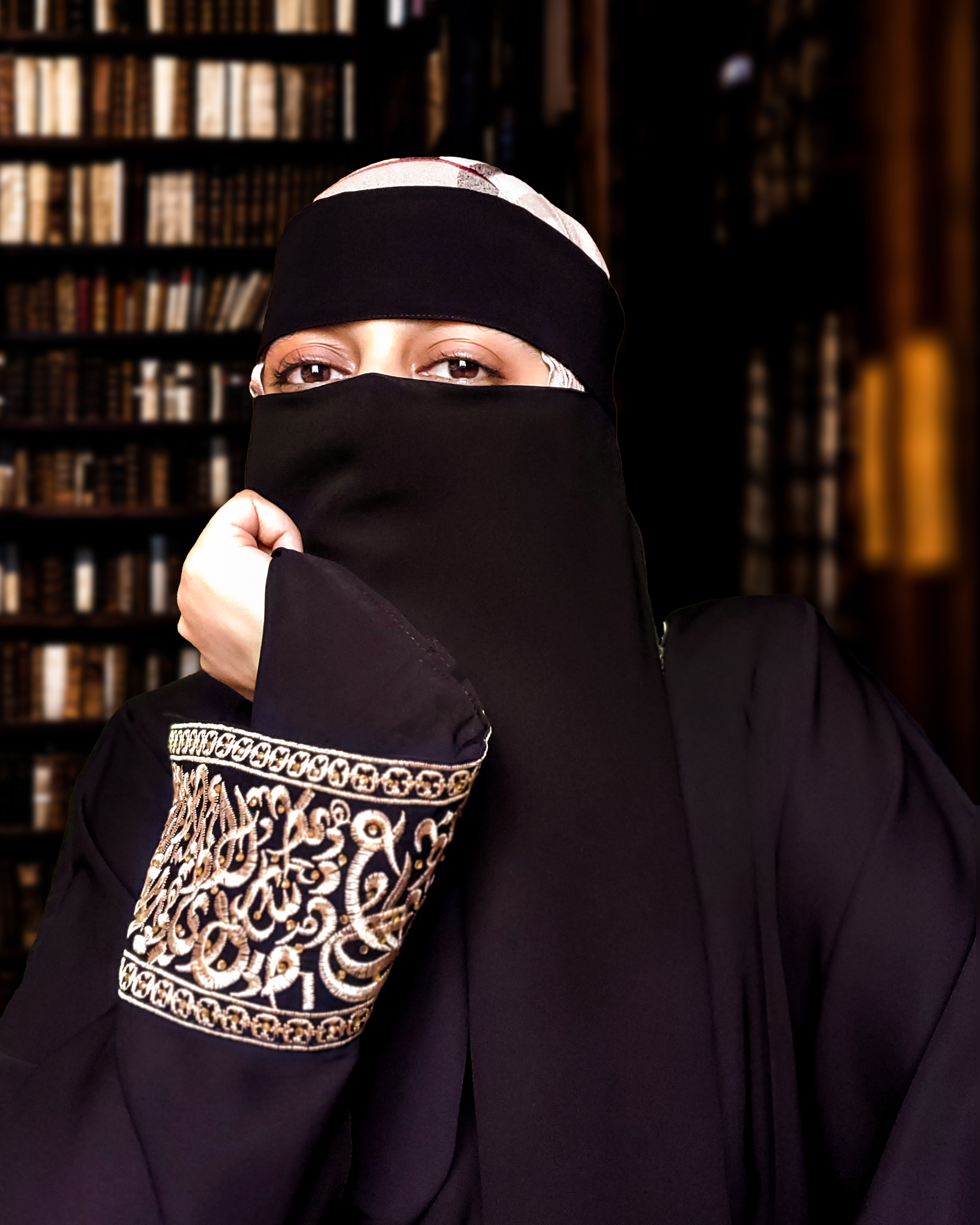
- Faizal in 2021
- Born: 1993 (age 32–33); Florida, U.S.
- Occupations: Novelist; designer; business owner
- Writing career
- Language: English
- Years active: 2013–present
- Genre: Young adult fiction
- Notable works: We Hunt the Flame; We Free the Stars
- Website: hafsahfaizal.com

Hafsah Faizal is an American author of young adult novels, best known for her New York Times best-selling fantasy novel We Hunt the Flame.

== Personal life ==
Faizal was born in Florida and grew up in California. She is an American Muslim of Sri Lankan and Arab descent. Her parents are both Muslim Sri Lankan immigrants. Faizal is the oldest of four children and has two sisters, Asma and Azraa.

Faizal was homeschooled starting at age thirteen. At the same age, she first started building her design skills, which led her founding her own web design company, IceyDesigns, at age seventeen.

Faizal names fellow young adult novelists Leigh Bardugo, Roshani Chokshi, and Renée Ahdieh as some of her major literary influences and describes Graceling by Kristin Cashore as the book that made her return to reading.

She lives in Texas.

== Career ==
Faizal wrote her first novel at age seventeen. Aside from writing, she also has been running a book blog called IceyBooks since September 2010. Faizal says that her background in design influences her writing to the degree that she considers to be a very visual writer.

Faizal self-published her first book under the pen name Hafsah Laziaf in October 2013. It was a young adult science fiction novel called Unbreathable, set in a distant future where Earth was destroyed and humanity settled on a new planet devastated by food shortages and oxygen scarcity.

Faizal wrote four other manuscripts before starting the first draft of We Hunt the Flame, which would be her first traditionally published novel. She found her literary agent through the Twitter book pitch contest #DVPit, finishing up the first draft of what would ultimately become We Hunt the Flame just before the contest started.

We Hunt the Flame was published by Farrar, Straus & Giroux in May 2019, the first of the Sands of Arawiya duology. It debuted on the New York Times bestseller list at #5 and receiving favorable reviews. Inspired by ancient Arabia, the novel tells the story of a hunter who disguises herself as a man in order to travel into a dangerous forest and restore magic to her people. Faizal set the story in a world reminiscent of ancient Arabia, avoiding ties to South Asian cultures that she states are often wrongfully entwined with stories about the Middle East.

The second Sands of Arawiya book, We Free the Stars, was released on January 19, 2021.

In February 2021, it was reported that STXtv was developing a television adaptation of We Hunt the Flame with Faizal as executive producer.

Her next book, A Tempest of Tea, was released February 20th, 2024 from FSG, Macmillan. In March 2024, A Tempest of Tea appeared on the New York Times bestseller list. The sequel, A Steeping of Blood, was released September 23, 2025 from FSG, Macmillan. In October 2025, A Steeping of Blood appeared on the New York Times bestseller list at #3.

== Works ==
=== Sands of Arawiya Duology ===
- We Hunt the Flame (2019)
- We Free the Stars (2021)

=== Blood and Tea Duology ===
- A Tempest of Tea (2024)
- A Steeping of Blood (2025)

=== Blade of Honey Duology ===
- Blade of Honey (2027)

=== Standalone Works ===
- The Dark Ascension series: The Wishless Ones (2025)

=== Anthology Contributions ===
- At Midnight ed. by Dahlia Adler (Flatiron Books, 2022)
