= In the Serpent's Wake =

2022 novel by Rachel Hartman

- Cover of first edition
- Author: Rachel Hartman
- Genre: Young adult fantasy novel
- Publisher: Random House
- Publication date: February 1, 2022
- Media type: Print (hardcover and electronic book) and audio-CD
- Pages: 512
- ISBN: 1101931329

In the Serpent's Wake is a 2022 fantasy novel by Rachel Hartman. It is a sequel to Tess of the Road. It was published by Random House on February 1, 2022. In the Serpent's Wake was listed as one of the best science fiction and fantasy novels of 2022 in The New York Times and appeared on the Young Adult Library Services Association's 2023 list of Best Fiction for Young Adults. It was a finalist for the 2023 Lodestar Award for Best Young Adult Book, awarded at the Hugo Awards.

== Synopsis ==
Tess of the Road ended with Tess joining Countess Margarethe’s scientific expedition to search for the Polar Serpent beyond the Southern Archipelagos. In the Serpent's Wake begins just a few days after the first book ends.

Tess is on a double mission: to get her friend Pathka to the Polar Serpent and save his life; and to observe Ninysh aggression against the indigenous peoples of the Southern Archipelagos and report it to her queen. While this sounds like the set-up for a simple White Savior story (and Tess attempts to fall into this trap herself once or twice), nothing is simple, and Tess quickly learns that some things are too big to accomplish alone. In fact, that idea is reflected in the very structure of the novel, which shifts viewpoints many times, de-centering Tess’s perspective. Other viewpoint characters include Spira, a dragon scholar who bears a justifiable grudge against Tess; Countess Margarethe, who must figure out how to use her power for good; Hami, a world-weary Ggdani Watcher who just wants to get home; Kikiu, a quigutl who knows she’s special and is waiting for the world to notice; a Katakutia, a mystical being who understands all languages and has no name; and Jacomo, a seminary drop-out who thinks he’s lost his faith but maybe hasn’t, quite. In the end, Tess doesn’t save the islanders, or even Pathka—although Spira persuades Hami to do the latter. Tess realizes that if she really wants to make a difference to the island peoples, she needs to go back home and take on the unglamorous task of shaping the next generation of leaders, her nieces, Zythia and Verica.

If Tess of the Road was about re-learning how to be the protagonist of your own life, In the Serpent's Wake is about taking that insight out into the world and applying it, not by swooping in to save the day like a superhero but by setting your ego aside and asking what others need of you. Jacomo sums it up in a moment of conversation with Countess Margarethe: “We… are not diminished or lost when we help others become the heroes of their own stories.”

== Reception ==
In the Serpent's Wake has been received positively by critics. The New York Times reported "In keeping with its predecessors, "In the Serpent's Wake" is wonderful, instantly immersive and deeply affecting." Kirkus Reviews said "Hartman’s inclusive world grapples with questions of sovereignty and colonization, religion, and gender in ways that both reflect and comment on our own world, generally without sacrificing the moving, if busy, narrative. A compelling duology closer." Booklist gave In the Serpent's Wake a starred review, writing "Each of Hartman’s nuanced characters—Tess, Margarethe, Jacomo, Spira, and more—grapples imperfectly with the injustices they observe, doing the emotionally difficult work to move from ignorance or denial to acknowledgement and action. Hartman deftly reflects our own world’s worries in this adventurous fantasy, but always with an eye toward hope and healing. A reviewer on Tor.com wrote "Since her 2012 YA novel Seraphina, Rachel Hartman has been regularly one-upping herself." Locus Magazine wrote "It took me a month to read In the Serpent's Wake, not because I struggled to get through it but because I wanted to savor the experience as long as possible. I tasted it a few chapters at a time, letting the characters and the subplots sink into me. Like its predecessor, it’s a novel that deserves to be sat with, to let it gradually reveal its secrets. It is deeper and more critical than you realize, yet also more honest and open than you’d expect."
