= Sheine Lende =

2024 fantasy novel by Darcie Little Badger

Sheine Lende is a 2024 fantasy novel by Darcie Little Badger, with illustrations by Rovina Cai. It is a prequel to her 2020 Elatsoe.

== Synopsis ==
In the early 1970s, Shane — who will one day become the grandmother of Elatsoe — and her mother Lorenza use their magical abilities to solve missing persons cases, until the day Lorenza herself vanishes.

== Title ==
Little Badger has stated that the book's title was intended to be "Sheiné łénde", but that this would have made it more difficult for search engines to find.

== Reception ==
Sheine Lende won the 2025 Lodestar Award. It was also a finalist for the 2026 American Indian Youth Literature Award for Best Young Adult Book.

Kirkus Reviews lauded it as "a balm for any soul weary of oppression", and noted that it offers "narrative complexity", "rich depictions of cultural identity, generational trauma, and community care," and "an empowering narrative of reclaiming one's stolen ancestry".

School Library Journal observed that it "stands alone" despite being a prequel, declaring it to be "wonderful" and "highly recommended", but noted that "(t)he flashbacks and changes in point-of-view slightly hinder the pacing" (while noting that "readers will likely be too invested in Shane's story to care").
