= Legendborn =

2020 fantasy novel by Tracy Deonn

- First edition
- Author: Tracy Deonn
- Cover artist: Hillary Wilson
- Language: English
- Series: The Legendborn Cycle
- Release number: 1
- Genre: Fantasy; Contemporary Fantasy
- Publisher: Simon & Schuster/McEl
- Publication date: September 15, 2020
- Publication place: United States
- Media type: Print/Digital
- Pages: 501
- Awards: Coretta Scott King/John Steptoe Award for New Talent (2021)
- ISBN: 9781534441606
- OCLC: 1143824811
- Followed by: Bloodmarked
- Website: Legendborn

Legendborn is a 2020 debut young adult fantasy novel by Tracy Deonn. Called "a modern day twist on Arthurian legend", it follows a Black teenage girl who discovers a secret and historically white magic society. The book is the first in The Legendborn Cycle series. It was released on September 15, 2020, and it was published under Simon & Schuster/McElderry. Legendborn received the Coretta Scott King Award/John Steptoe Award for New Talent as well as a nomination for the Los Angeles Times Book Prize.

== Plot summary ==
The novel's main character is 16-year-old Bree Matthews, a high schooler attending a residential program for bright students, who attempts to infiltrate a historically white magical society at the University of North Carolina at Chapel Hill when she finds out that some members may have been involved in her mother's recent death.

Three months after her mother's death, Bree attends the University of North Carolina with her friend Alice. On the first night, they sneak out of campus with a group of people. They get caught and are given peer mentors to watch over them due to breaking the law. While Bree is walking with her peer mentor Nick, a Shadowborn monster appears, and Nick slays it with a sword. Bree is then taken to an unknown building where a strange man attempts to erase her memory, but fails without knowing so.

Through Nick, Bree discovers a secret organization that is full of Legendborn nobles—descendants of King Arthur and twelve of his knights. She gradually recovers her memory of her mother's death and is able to uncover the mage's organization enough to decide to infiltrate it as a page, which is a person training to defend the Legendborn nobles.

Over time, she slowly uncovers more about the society. The thirteen knights reincarnate into a descendant called a Scion. Each knight sometimes calls their Scion, which gives them power at the cost of a shortened life, and there is a set order in which they are called. The descendants of Merlin are mages called Merlins, like the mage who attempted to wipe Bree's memory earlier in the book, Sel. As Nick and Bree's relationship grows, Sel begins to suspect that Bree is an undercover Shadowborn, complicating her chances of becoming a Page.

Bree's therapist has connections to a group that uses magic (called Root) differently than the descendants of Arthur. The Root practitioners call the Legendborn magic Bloodcraft and hate its users; Bloodcraft grants great power, but it comes at a high cost. For the Legendborn, it means that their lives are shortened, and for their leader, it means that the Legendborn could lose all magic if they died.

While studying with the Root practitioners, she learns that Sel is part-demon. Bree confronts Sel, and Sel reveals that their demonic nature as descendants of Merlin is why they are bound young in oaths.

== Background ==
Tracy Deonn was inspired by The Dark is Rising series by Susan Cooper. She was also influenced by the death of her mother. Having worked in video games, she took that knowledge to help develop the stringent rules that guide the magical system described in the book.

== Publication history ==
- 2020. First edition hardcover. Publication date September 15, 2020. Simon & Schuster/McElderry, ISBN 9781534441606

== Reception ==
Legendborn received critical acclaim. Publishers Weekly stated, "Though hazy exposition initially slows the narrative, Deonn adeptly employs the haunting history of the American South [...] to explore themes of ancestral pain, grief, and love, balancing them with stimulating worldbuilding and multiple thrilling plot twists." In a starred review, Bookpage praised Deonn's writing: "Legendborn establishes Deonn as an important new voice in YA. Its gorgeous prose and heart-splitting honesty compel an eyes-wide-open reading experience."

Syfy.com called the book "a refreshing twist on classic Arthurian legend with a lot of Southern Black girl magic to boot." In a similarly positive review, Natalie Berglind wrote in a review for the Bulletin of the Center for Children's Books, "Deonn brings Arthurian legend to life with originality, a dash of heart-pounding demon-slaying, and a deep and meaningful acknowledgement of the violent roots of slavery in U.S. history." Kirkus Reviews noted: "Representation of actualized, strong queer characters is organic, not forced, and so are textual conversations around emotional wellness and intergenerational trauma [...] Well-crafted allusions to established legends and other literary works are delightful easter eggs."

The book was recommended by BuzzFeed, Nerdist, and io9. Legendborn was on the New York Times Best Seller List for nine weeks.

== Accolades ==
=== 2020 ===
- Los Angeles Times Book Prize - Best Young Adult Novel, Finalist
- School Library Journal - Best Young Adult Books

=== 2021 ===
- Coretta Scott King Award/John Steptoe Award for New Talent, Winner
- American Library Association, Top Ten Amazing Audiobooks for Young Adults
- YALSA, Best Fiction for Young Adults
- Lodestar Award for Best Young Adult Book - Finalist
- Locus Awards for Best Young Adult Book - Finalist
- American Library Association - YALSA's Teens' Top Ten, Nominee
- Ignyte Award, Best Novel - YA

== Television adaptation ==
On February 2, 2022, it was announced that Black Bear Television acquired the rights to adapt the book into a television series, with screenwriter Felicia D. Henderson as the co-executive producer.
