= Raybearer =

2020 novel by Jordan Ifueko

- Author: Jordan Ifueko
- Language: English
- Series: Raybearer #1
- Genres: Young adult, Fantasy
- Publisher: Amulet Books
- Publication date: August 18, 2020
- Publication place: United States
- ISBN: 9781419739828
- Followed by: Redemptor

Raybearer is a 2020 young adult fantasy novel by Nigerian American writer Jordan Ifueko. Ifueko's debut, it was published by Amulet Books, an imprint of Abrams, on August 18, 2020.

It is the first of two books in the Raybearer series. A continuation, Redemptor, followed in 2021. It was included in the New York Times Bestseller list. It received many awards and acclaim.

== Synopsis ==
A young girl, Tarisai, is bound by a magical wish made by her mother, who is absent and distant in Tarisai's early life. Tarisai has the ability to see the stories of other people's lives with a touch, while her story unfolds and is yet to be seen. She discovers that while her mother, known as The Lady, is human, her father is a magical being known as an "alagbato". She was conceived to fulfill her mother's plot to kill the Crown Prince.

The Lady sends Tarisai to the city of Oluwan, the capital of the Aritsar Empire in order to train and compete to become one of the Crown Prince's closest confidantes. If Tarisai is picked, she will be joined with the other members of a council through the Ray, a bond considered deeper than blood. In the end, Tarisai resists her mother's plan for her.

== Background ==
Ifueko began writing the novel in its early stage as a teenager. The novel is set in a secondary world based on the author's Nigerian heritage and other world cultures. It was influenced by Ifueko's knowledge of West African culture, civilizations and experiences as a child of immigrants in California.

== Television adaptation ==
In September 2021, it was announced that Netflix will be adapting the novel into a television series, under a new overall deal with Gina Atwater. The project will be produced by Suger23 and Macro Television Studios with Atwater as writer, director and producer.

== Reception ==
Raybearer is a New York Times Bestseller and was named one of the best books of the year by People, BuzzFeed, New York Public Library, Chicago Public Library, Kirkus Reviews, School Library Journal, and Publishers Weekly.

The book has received many positive reviews. Entertainment Weekly called the book "dazzling." Buzzfeed said it was "one of the most exceptional YA fantasies of all time." People said it was a "brilliantly conceived fantasy." Seventeen called it a "bold new world," and PopSugar lauded Ifueko's "exquisitely detailed world."

== Awards and recognitions ==
- Andre Norton Award Nominee (2020)
- Kitschies Golden Tentacle (Debut) Shortlist (2020)
- NPR Best Books in December 2020
- Goodreads Choice Award Nominee for Young Adult Fantasy & Science Fiction (2020)
- Goodreads Choice Award Nominee for Debut Novel (2020)
- BookNest Award Nominee for Best Debut Novel (2020)
- Association for Library Service to Children's Notable Children's Books (2021)
- American Library Association's (ALA) Top Ten Amazing Audiobooks for Young Adults (2021)
- ALA Top Ten Best Fiction (2021)
- Ignyte Award for Best Novel for Young Adult Fiction finalist (2021)
- Audie Award for Fantasy finalist (2021)
- Waterstones Children's Book Prize for Older Readers Longlist (2021)
- Lodestar Award Nominee (2021)
- Mythopoeic Fantasy Award Finalist (2021)

== Sequel ==
A sequel titled Redemptor was published in August 2021. Buzzfeed named Redemptor one of the best books of August 2021, saying it was "[i]mmersive and gorgeously written."
