= Shadow Scale =

2015 novel by Rachel Hartman

- Davidson cover of first edition
- Author: Rachel Hartman
- Cover artist: Andrew Davidson
- Genre: Young adult fantasy novel
- Publisher: Random House
- Publication date: March 10, 2015
- Media type: Print (hardcover and electronic book) and audio-CD
- Pages: 608
- ISBN: 978-0-375-86657-9
- LC Class: PZ7.H26736Sh 2015
- Preceded by: Seraphina

Shadow Scale is a 2015 fantasy novel by Rachel Hartman. It is the sequel and conclusion to her first novel, Seraphina (2012). It was released in hardcover, ebook, and audio book format on March 10, 2015.

== Synopsis ==
Shadow Scale starts about three months after the events of Seraphina. A war between rebel dragons and those dragons loyal to the peace treaty with humans has begun. Seraphina sets out to search for other half-human/half-dragons like herself in travels that take her away from Goredd to the states of Samsam, Ninys and Porphyry, in the hopes that the other half-dragons will be able to protect Goredd from attack. She is opposed by other forces who have their own plans to make use of the half-dragons.

== Reception ==
Shadow Scale appeared on the New York Times Best Seller List for Young Adult books in its first week of eligibility. Critical reviews have been positive, with the book receiving several starred reviews. Kirkus Reviews wrote that Hartman "continues to expand her world with enough history and detail to satisfy even the most questioning of readers, doing it all so naturally that it’s hard to believe this is fiction. Dragon fiction has never flown higher." Booklist and Publishers Weekly also gave Shadow Scale starred reviews, writing, "This is a worthy and wholly satisfying continuation of Seraphina’s tale." Quill & Quire wrote, "Shadow Scale is an exceptionally written fantasy seen through the eyes of a young woman caught between two worlds. Fans of Seraphina who have been eagerly awaiting this follow up will not be disappointed."
