= Bloodmarked =

2022 young adult novel by Tracy Deonn

- Author: Tracy Deonn
- Cover artist: Hillary D. Wilson
- Language: English
- Series: The Legendborn Cycle
- Release number: 2
- Genre: Fantasy; Contemporary Fantasy; Young adult fantasy
- Publisher: Simon & Schuster Books for Young Readers
- Publication date: November 8, 2022
- Publication place: United States
- Pages: 576
- ISBN: 978-1-5344-4163-7
- Preceded by: Legendborn
- Website: Bloodmarked

Bloodmarked is the second installment in The Legendborn Cycle by Tracy Deonn. It was published on November 8, 2022, by Simon & Schuster Books for Young Readers and has been called "a worthy successor" to its predecessor, Legendborn. Bloodmarked picks up the story one month after the events at the end of Legendborn, with Bree and her friends recovering from battle and preparing to locate and rescue Nick Davis, Bree's boyfriend and the Scion of Lancelot.

== Plot summary ==
Bloodmarked begins with Nick Davis, Bree's boyfriend and the Scion of Lancelot, missing after being kidnapped by his father and Bree confined to her room in the Lodge for her protection. Bree, frustrated and stir crazy, sneaks out to practice her magic. Selwyn Kane, a Merlin tasked with keeping Bree and the rest of the Order of the Round Table safe, discovers she has left her room. They are soon attacked by demons, and Bree is removed from the battle by an unknown entity who turns out to be a member of the Mageguard, "the elite military unit of the Order's forces."

The Mageguard have arrived at the Lodge to ensure its safety before the arrival of the Council, who will be attending the memorial service for those who lost their lives during the battle one month earlier. After the memorial, the Mageguard initiates the Rite of Kings, during which Bree is expected to complete the Oath and claim her title of King. During the Rite, Bree sees Nick in Lancelot's place and turns down the Oath. Her vision of the Round Table changes into that of her ancestral stream, where she sees Vera, her ancestor, before waking again in the ogof where she began the Rite of Kings. She is briefly aware of her surroundings before feeling a syringe plunged into her neck and falling unconscious.

Bree awakes repeatedly to the Council members asking her questions about her mother and her powers. The first time she is fully aware, she is being treated by her friend William, who tells her the Rite was an ambush and that the Council has been holding the two of them in a facility for three days, controlled by a serum that subdues their powers. They have been mesmering Bree as well, William tells her, and she is finally able to resist the mesmer through pain, as she has in the past. Two more days pass before Bree is aided in a breakout conducted by members of the Order who are still loyal to her, along with her friend Alice. Bree, Alice, William, Sel (rescued from a separate facility), and their three allies board a plane and travel to a safe house. On the plane, Bree has another vivid dream/vision in which she is able to communicate with Nick.

At the safe house, Bree is attacked by a goruchel, one of the strongest types of demons. The group discovers that their host made a deal with the demon, wanting her to kill Bree, which would cut off the bloodlines and effectively end the Order of the Round Table. Before they kill the demon, Sel and Bree interrogate her, and she reveals that there is a demon referred to as "The Great Devourer," "who hunts humans for power." This makes Bree think of a man she had seen in visions sent to her by her ancestors, known by them as the Hunter.

Leaving the safe house behind, Bree, William, Alice, and Sel end up at a bar for magical beings. There, they meet Valec, a demon who sets up deals between demons and humans, acting as a broker and monitoring the magic used in the bar. When he discovers how powerful Bree is, he introduces her to another Rootcrafter, who agrees to allow the group to stay with her for some time. Once at her home, Bree has another vision of Nick, which cuts off when he appears frightened by something and reveals his location to her. She relays the message to Sel, and the two of them go to rescue Nick. From afar, they watch as Nick's father is struck by a spear meant for Nick. In retaliation, Nick beheads the Merlin who threw the spear. Nick catches sight of Bree and Sel, shaking his head before disappearing into the woods in the opposite direction. Bree and Sel are attacked by Erebus, but they are able to fight him off. Shortly after, Valec appears to take them back to their new safe house, before they are attacked by demons. Bree very nearly dies, but Valec is able to bring William back to her in time.

Feeling that they are no longer safe at their current base, the group travels to Volition, whose grounds are protected by ancient Rootcraft. There, Bree practices summoning aether and using her root interchangeably. The Mageguard find where they are staying and plan to take Bree as their prisoner. Bree decides to use the power of Arthur to fight them off, but Arthur takes over her body, pushing her consciousness into the maze of memories Arthur had been living in for centuries. Arthur is determined to maintain corporeality, while Bree is determined to find her way out of his subconscious. Sel and Nick, as Merlin and Lancelot, help Bree reemerge. The effort of this causes Sel to devolve and lose most of his human characteristics to the point where he most closely resembles a demon.

Bree realizes that the "Great Devourer," the demon feared by other demons, with whom her ancestor Vera made a blood pact, is someone she knows: Erebus. Bree decides to let his curse die with her. She makes a pact with him: she will go with him if he finds Selwyn's mother, the only Merlin who may be powerful enough to restore Sel's humanity.

== Characters ==
- Briana "Bree" Matthews—Scion of Arthur—The protagonist of the series, Bree is a student in the Early College program at UNC Chapel Hill. She recently discovered that she is the descendant of King Arthur as well as Vera, an enslaved woman who made a deal with a demon to protect her daughter. These two bloodlines converge in Bree, giving her the ability to control both Root magic and aether.
- Selwyn Kane—descendant of Merlin—As a descendant of Merlin, Selwyn has magical powers, such as enhanced hearing, increased speed, and the ability to cast mesmers, which can erase their target's memories. Selwyn is bonded to Nick Davis as his Kingsmage.
- Nick Davis—Scion of Lancelot—Nick, originally thought to be the Scion of Arthur but recently discovered to be descended from his best friend, Lancelot, is Bree's boyfriend and has been kidnapped.
- Alice Chen—Alice is Bree's high school best friend who enrolled in UNC Chapel Hill's Early College program at the same time as Bree. She possesses no magical abilities but is posing as a Vassal (a member of a family dedicated to the Order).
- William Sitterson—Scion of Gawain—Bree's friend and the healer of her chapter of the Order. As the Scion of Gawain, he is the most powerful Scion at the height of his power, which occurs between midnight and two a.m. each night.
- Erebus Varelian—Seneschal of Shadows—Head of the Mageguard, Erebus is the most powerful Merlin in the world.
- Valec—A demon who arranges deals between humans and demons, he proves to be a powerful and necessary ally to Bree and her friends.

== Themes ==
While Legendborn focused heavily on Bree's grief over losing her mother, and Bloodmarked is "a very intentional continuation of grief," the second installment of Deonn's series delves deeper into other themes as well. In an interview with Shondaland, Deonn noted that she wanted to write a book "engaging with, deeply understanding, analyzing, holding on to, [and] reshaping your own Blackness in spaces where it’s being challenged or dismissed by other people" as well as "the types of stories and the type of people that become legendary," and the role of the history of Black people and enslavement in America in creating these legends.

== Reception ==
Bloodmarked has been well-received by critics and audiences. It was an instant New York Times Bestseller, debuting at number one and spending ten weeks on the Young Adults Hardcover Best Seller List. Similarly, it has appeared on the Kids Indie Next List in the Young Adult category. It has received many positive reviews, including a Kirkus review calling the book "a worthy successor to an explosive debut." Deonn is also lauded for her "commitment to presenting unflinching truths about the cyclical insidiousness of racism," which is an undeniable theme throughout Bloodmarked. A School Library Journal review calls the book "a must for all library collections."
