= Rachel Hartman =

American author and comic artist (born 1972)

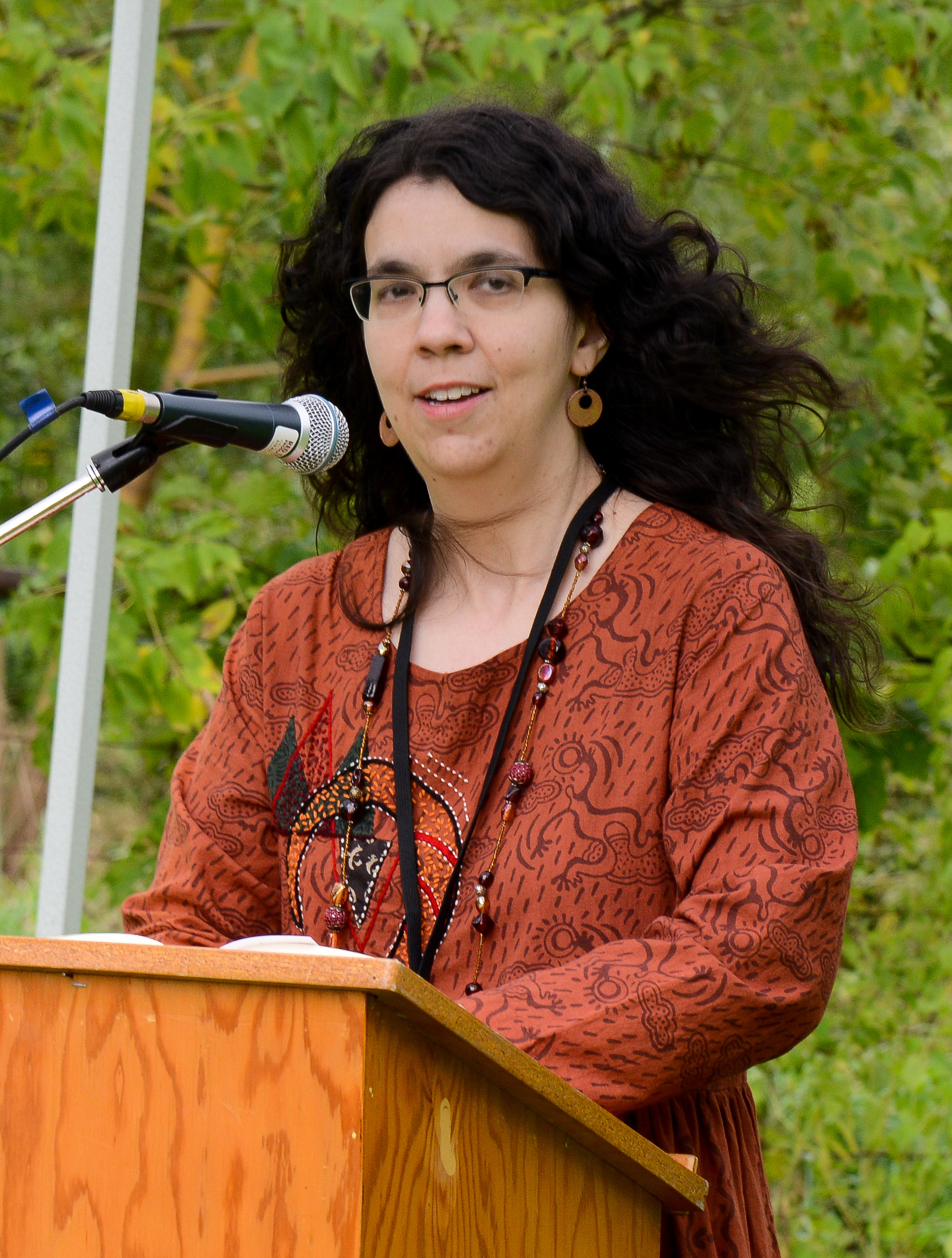
- Hartman at the 2013 Eden Mills Writers' Festival
- Born: July 9, 1972 (age 54); Kentucky
- Education: Washington University in St. Louis
- Occupations: Comics creator novelist
- Notable work: Seraphina
- Website: rachelhartmanbooks.com

Rachel Hartman (born July 9, 1972 in Kentucky) is an American writer and artist of comics, and an author of young adult fiction. She is known for her books Seraphina (2012), Shadow Scale (2015), Tess of the Road (2018), In the Serpent's Wake (2022), and Among Ghosts (2025).

== Early life ==
Rachel Hartman was born on July 9, 1972 in Kentucky. She lived in numerous places including Lexington, Kentucky, Chicago, Philadelphia, St. Louis, England, and Japan. she attended Washington University in St. Louis, where she obtained a BA in Comparative Literature.

== Career ==
In 1996, Hartman published her first comic book, Amy Unbounded, the Ashcan Series.

Her first book, Seraphina, received the 2013 William C. Morris Award, awarded to best young adult book published in the US by a debut author and won the 2012 Cybils Award for best young adult fantasy or science fiction novel. Shadow Scale appeared on the New York Times Best Seller List for Young Adult books in its first week of eligibility. Her third novel, Tess of the Road, a companion novel featuring new characters as well as appearances of characters from her first two novels, was released on February 27, 2018., followed in 2022 by the fourth, In the Serpent's Wake. Hartman's fifth novel, Among Ghosts, was published in June 2025.

== Personal life ==
Hartman lives in Vancouver, British Columbia with her husband and son.

Her hobbies include reading, playing role-playing games, dancing, and playing the cello.

== Awards and honors ==
- 2000 Kimberly Yale Award for Best New Talent for Amy Unbounded
- 2012 Cybils Award for Best Young Adult Fantasy or Science Fiction Novel, for Seraphina
- 2013 William C. Morris Award, for Seraphina
