= Elatsoe =

Young adult novel published in 2020

- Author: Darcie Little Badger
- Audio read by: Kinsale Hueston
- Illustrator: Rovina Cai
- Language: English
- Genre: Fantasy, young adult literature
- Publisher: Levine Querido
- Publication date: August 25, 2020
- Publication place: United States
- Media type: Print (hardcover), ebook, audiobook
- Pages: 368 pp.
- ISBN: 9781646140053 (hardcover 1st ed.)
- OCLC: 1131773594
- Dewey Decimal: 813/.6
- LC Class: PZ7.1.L57812 El 2020

Elatsoe is a 2020 young adult novel by Darcie Little Badger marketed to young readers aged 12–18. It is Little Badger's debut novel. It was included on Time's list of the 100 Best Fantasy Books of All Time. Some publications have classed the novel as part of the Indigenous Futurism movement.

== Plot ==
Elatsoe is set in contemporary Texas, but supernatural creatures like ghosts, vampires, and fairies exist. The titular character Elatsoe, nicknamed Ellie, is a 17-year old asexual Lipan Apache girl. She has the ability to recall the ghosts of deceased animals, due to knowledge passed down through her family; Ellie chooses to bring back the ghost of her childhood dog, Kirby, as her companion. Ellie's best friend, Jay, is a descendant of Oberon.

One night, Kirby is spooked by an unknown cause, and shortly afterward Ellie learns that her cousin, Trevor, has died in an apparent car accident. After her mother flies to fictional Willowbee, Texas to support his widowed wife, Lenore, and infant child, Trevor's ghost appears to Ellie. He tells her he was murdered by Abe Allerton, a wealthy local doctor, and asks her to protect his wife and child. She and her father join her mother in Texas. Ellie sets out on a mission to bring her cousin's killer to justice, during which she learns about some misdeeds committed by her own ancestors.

== Development ==
Little Badger came up with the idea for Elatsoe when she was a teenager. Although initially intended to be written for an adult audience, Little Badger decided to shift to a young adult demographic given the teenage protagonist.

== Critical reception and reviews ==
Cole Rush of Tor.com gave 9/10 review to Elatsoe and wrote "I highly recommend picking up the book and relishing Darcie Little Badger’s exquisite tale". It was also reviewed favorably by NPR, School Library Journal, The Horn Book Magazine, and Kirkus Reviews.

== Prequel ==
Sheine Lende, a prequel novel set two generations prior to the events of Elatsoe, was published in 2024.

== Awards and honors ==
=== Awards ===
Year	Award	Category	Result	Ref.
2021	ALA's Best Fiction for Young Adults	—	Finalist	
2021	Ignyte Award	Young Adult Novel	Finalist	
2021	Locus Award	First Novel	Won	
2021	Lodestar Award for Best Young Adult Book	—	Finalist	
2022	American Indian Youth Literature Awards	Young Adult	Honor	
2022	Whippoorwill Book Award	—	Won	

=== Honors ===
- Time's Best 100 Fantasy Books of All Time
- BuzzFeed's Best YA SFF Book of 2020
- Chicago Public Library's Best of the Best Books of 2020
- Kirkus Reviews Best YA Book of 2020
- NPR's Best Book of 2020
- Publishers Weekly Best Book of 2020
- Shelf Awareness's Best Children's & Teen Books of 2020
