= Cybils Awards for Speculative Fiction =

Annual literary awards

The Cybils Awards for Speculative Fiction are annual literary awards for children's speculative fiction. Awards have been presented in three categories: general science fiction and fantasy (in 2006), elementary and middle grade (since 2007), and young adult (since 2007). The award was last presented in 2024, with the organization taking a hiatus in 2025.

== Recipients ==
=== General science fiction and fantasy (2006) ===
Year	Author	Title	Result	Ref.
2006	Jonathan Stroud	Ptolemy's Gate	Winner	
2006	Cliff McNish, illus. by Geoff Taylor	Silver City	Finalists	
2006	Tamora Pierce	Beka Cooper: Terrier	Finalists	
2006	Silvana De Mari, trans. by Shaun Whiteside	The Last Dragon	Finalists	
2006	Melanie Gideon	Pucker	Finalists	

=== Elementary and middle grade (2007–) ===
Year	Author	Title	Result	Ref.
2007	Adam Rex	The True Meaning of Smekday	Winner	
2007	Laura Ruby	The Chaos King	Finalists	
2007	Sarah Beth Durst	Into the Wild	Finalists	
2007	Nancy Farmer	The Land of the Silver Apples	Finalists	
2007	Derek Landy, illus. by Tom Percival	Skulduggery Pleasant	Finalists	
2008	Neil Gaiman, illus. by Dave McKean	The Graveyard Book	Winner	
2008	Marie Rutkoski	Cabinet of Wonders	Finalist	
2008	D. M. Cornish	Lamplighter	Finalist	
2008	Sarah Prineas, illus. by Antonio Javier Caparo	The Magic Thief	Finalist	
2008	Ingrid Law	Savvy	Finalist	
2009	Laini Taylor	Silksinger	Winner	
2009	Wendy Mass	11 Birthdays	Finalist	
2009	Joni Sensel	The Farwalker's Quest	Finalist	
2009	Neil Gaiman	Odd and the Frost Giants	Finalist	
2009	Julianna Baggott	The Prince of Fenway Park	Finalist	
2009	Joan Aiken	The Serial Garden	Finalist	
2009	Grace Lin	Where the Mountain Meets the Moon	Finalist	
2010	Jacqueline West	The Shadows (Books of Elsewhere, Vol. 1),	Winner	
2010	Michael Grant	The Call	Finalists	
2010	Buckingham	The Dead Boys	Finalists	
2010	Ursula Vernon	Dragonbreath: Attack of the Ninja Frogs	Finalists	
2010	Philip Reeve	Fever Crumb	Finalists	
2010	Jewell Parker Rhodes	Ninth Ward	Finalists	
2010	Cornelia Funke	Reckless	Finalists	
2011	Carmen Agra Deedy and Randall Wright, illustrated by Barry Moser	The Cheshire Cheese Cat: A Dickens of a Tale	Winner	
2011	Patrick Ness	A Monster Calls	Finalist	
2011	Anne Ursu	Breadcrumbs	Finalist	
2011	Joseph Bruchac	Dragon Castle	Finalist	
2011	Matthew J. Kirby	Icefall	Finalist	
2011	Chris Moriarty	The Inquisitor's Apprentice	Finalist	
2011	Jessica Day George	Tuesdays at the Castle	Finalist	
2012	Jennifer A. Nielsen	The False Prince	Winner	
2012	Kate Saunders	Beswitched	Finalist	
2012	Mike Jung	Geeks, Girls, and Secret Identities	Finalist	
2012	Anne Nesbet	The Cabinet of Earths	Finalist	
2012	Jasper Fforde	The Last Dragonslayer	Finalist	
2012	Katherine Applegate	The One and Only Ivan	Finalist	
2012	Stefan Bachmann	The Peculiar	Finalist	
2013	Jonathan Stroud	The Screaming Staircase	Winner	
2013	Sage Blackwood	Jinx	Finalist	
2013	Holly Webb	Rose	Finalist	
2013	John David Anderson	Sidekicked	Finalist	
2013	Brandon Sanderson	The Rithmatist	Finalist	
2013	Kathi Appelt	The True Blue Scouts of Sugar Man Swamp	Finalist	
2013	Megan Frazer Blakemore	The Water Castle	Finalist	
2014	Paul Durham	The Luck Uglies	Winner	
2014	N. D. Wilson	Boys of Blur	Finalist	
2014	Kate Milford	Greenglass House	Finalist	
2014	Lynne Rae Perkins	Nuts to You	Finalist	
2014	Merrie Haskell	The Castle Behind Thorns	Finalist	
2014	Jason Fry	The Jupiter Pirates: Hunt for the Hydra	Finalist	
2014	Charis Cotter	The Swallow	Finalist	
2015	Joel Ross	The Fog Diver	Winner	
2015	Jewell Parker Rhodes	Bayou Magic	Finalist	
2015	Ursula Vernon	Castle Hangnail	Finalist	
2015	Frances Hardinge	Cuckoo Song	Finalist	
2015	Sophia McDougall	Mars Evacuees	Finalist	
2015	John David Anderson	The Dungeoneers	Finalist	
2015	Tui T. Sutherland	Moon Rising	Finalist	
2016	Joshua Khan	Shadow Magic	Winner	
2016	Delia Sherman	The Evil Wizard Smallbone	Finalist	
2016	Megan Frazer Blakemore	The Firefly Code	Finalist	
2016	Andrew Chilton	The Goblin's Puzzle: Being the Adventures of a Boy with No Name and Two Girls Called Alice	Finalist	
2016	Bryce Moore	The Memory Thief	Finalist	
2016	Claire Fayers	The Voyage to Magical North	Finalist	
2016	Grace Lin	When the Sea Turned to Silver	Finalist	
2017	Stephanie Burgis	The Dragon with a Chocolate Heart	Winner	
2017	Frances Hardinge	A Face Like Glass	Finalist	
2017	William Alexander	A Properly Unhaunted Place	Finalist	
2017	Kevin Emerson	Last Day on Mars	Finalist	
2017	Sage Blackwood	Miss Ellicott's School for the Magically Minded	Finalist	
2017	Ellen Oh	Spirit Hunters	Finalist	
2017	Katie Slivensky	The Countdown Conspiracy	Finalist	
2018	Jessica Townsend	Nevermoor: The Trials of Morrigan Crow	Winner	
2018	Kenneth Oppel	Inkling	Finalist	
2018	Anna Meriano	Love Sugar Magic: A Dash of Trouble	Finalist	
2018	Adam Jay Epstein	Snared: Escape to the Above	Finalist	
2018	Jonathan Auxier	Sweep: The Story of a Girl and Her Monster	Finalist	
2018	Sarah Beth Durst	The Stone Girl's Story	Finalist	
2018	Zac Gorman	Thisby Thestoop and the Black Mountain	Finalist	
2019	Kwame Mbalia	Tristan Strong Punches a Hole in the Sky	Winner	
2019	Greg van Eekhout	Cog	Finalist	
2019	Tom O'Donnell	Homerooms and Hall Passes	Finalist	
2019	Anna Meriano	Love Sugar Magic: A Sprinkle of Spirits	Finalist	
2019	Carlos Hernandez	Sal and Gabi Break the Universe	Finalist	
2019	Sarah Jean Horwitz	The Dark Lord Clementine	Finalist	
2019	Geoff Rodkey	We're Not from Here	Finalist	
2020	Deva Fagan	Rival Magic	Winner	
2020	Christina Soontornvat	A Wish in the Dark	Finalist	
2020	Alex Aster	Curse of the Night Witch	Finalist	
2020	Julie Abe	Eva Evergreen, Semi-Magical Witch	Finalist	
2020	Swiedler	In the Red	Finalist	
2020	Grace Lin, illus. by Grace Lin	Mulan: Before the Sword	Finalist	
2020	Kate Alice Marshall	Thirteens	Finalist	
2021	Kaela Rivera	Cece Rios and the Desert of Souls	Winner	
2021	Justina Ireland	Ophie's Ghosts	Finalist	
2021	B. B. Alston	Amari and the Night Brothers	Finalist	
2021	Sangu Mandanna	Kiki Kallira Breaks a Kingdom	Finalist	
2021	Donna Barba Higuera	The Last Cuentista	Finalist	
2021	Anne Ursu	The Troubled Girls of Dragomir Academy	Finalist	
2021	Kyle Lukoff	Too Bright to See	Finalist	
2022	Deva Fagan	The Mirrorwood	Winner	
2022	Tracy Badua	Freddie vs. the Family Curse	Finalist	
2022	Dhonielle Clayton, illus. by Khadijah Khatib	The Marvellers	Finalist	
2022	Lora Senf	The Clackity	Finalist	
2022	Karen Strong	Eden's Everdark	Finalist	
2022	Efua Traoré	Children of the Quicksands	Finalist	
2022	Greg van Eekhout	Fenris & Mott	Finalist	
2023	Heather Fawcett	The Grace of Wild Things	Winner	
2023	Sarah Jean Horwitz	The Demon Sword Asperides	Finalist	
2023	Sachiko Kashiwab, illustrated by Yukkio Saito, translated by Avery Fischer Udagawa	The House of the Lost on the Cape	Finalist	
2023	Celia Krampien	The Bellwoods Game	Finalist	
2023	Questlove and S. A. Cosby	The Rhythm of Time	Finalist	
2023	Eden Royce	Conjure Island	Finalist	
2023	Nina Verla	Juniper Harvey and the Vanishing Kingdom	Finalist	
2024	Katherine Rundell, illustrated by Ashley Mackenzie	Impossible Creatures	Winner	
2024	Clare Edge	Accidental Demons	Finalist	
2024	Deke Moulton	Benji Zeb Is a Ravenous Werewolf	Finalist	
2024	Craig Kofi Farmer	Kwame Crashes the Underworld	Finalist	
2024	Adam Gidwitz	Max in the House of Spies: A Tale of World War II	Finalist	
2024	Rajani LaRocca	Sona and the Golden Beasts	Finalist	
2024	Marieke Nijkamp	Splinter & Ash	Finalist	

=== Young adult (2007–) ===
Year	Author	Title	Result	Ref.
2007	Shannon Hale	Book of a Thousand Days	Winner	
2007	Catherine Fisher	Incarceron	Finalists	
2007	Meg Burden	Northlander	Finalists	
2007	A. M. Jenkins	Repossessed	Finalists	
2007	Kathleen Duey	Skin Hunger	Finalists	
2008	Suzanne Collins	The Hunger Games	Winner	
2008	Eoin Colfer	Airman	Finalists	
2008	Elizabeth C. Bunce	Curse Dark as Gold	Finalists	
2008	Jenny Davidson	Explosionist	Finalists	
2008	Kristin Cashore	Graceling	Finalists	
2008	Lisa McMann	Wake	Finalists	
2009	Kristin Cashore	Fire	Winner	
2009	Pam Bachorz	Candor	Finalist	
2009	Sarah Rees Brennan	The Demon's Lexicon	Finalist	
2009	A. S. King	The Dust of 100 Dogs	Finalist	
2009	Laini Taylor	Lips Touch	Finalist	
2009	Kathleen Duey	Sacred Scars	Finalist	
2009	Antonia Michaelis	Tiger Moon	Finalist	
2010	Jonathan Maberry	Rot & Ruin	Winner	
2010	Brian Falkner	Brain Jack	Finalists	
2010	Karen Healey	Guardian of the Dead	Finalists	
2010	Erin Bow	Plain Kate	Finalists	
2010	Stephen Wallenfels	Pod	Finalists	
2010	Paolo Bacigalupi	Ship Breaker	Finalists	
2010	Donna Jo Napoli	The Wager	Finalists	
2011	Moira Young	Blood Red Road	Winner	
2011	Susan Ee	Angelfall	Finalist	
2011	Kendare Blake	Anna Dressed in Blood	Finalist	
2011	Jon Skovron	Misfit	Finalist	
2011	Holly Black	Red Glove	Finalist	
2011	Rae Carson	The Girl of Fire and Thorns	Finalist	
2011	Karen Healey	The Shattering	Finalist	
2012	Rachel Hartman	Seraphina	Winner	
2012	Andrea K Höst	And All the Stars	Finalist	
2012	David Levithan	Every Day	Finalist	
2012	Ian McDonald	Planesrunner	Finalist	
2012	Brenna Yovanoff, Tessa Gratton, and Maggie Stiefvater	The Curiosities: A Collection of Stories	Finalist	
2012	Paolo Bacigalupi	The Drowned Cities	Finalist	
2012	Sarah Beth Durst	Vessel	Finalist	
2013	Alaya Dawn Johnson	The Summer Prince	Winner	
2013	Sarah Beth Durst	Conjured	Finalist	
2013	Robin LaFevers	Dark Triumph	Finalist	
2013	Laura Lam	Pantomime	Finalist	
2013	Robin McKinley	Shadows	Finalist	
2013	Robin Wasserman	The Waking Dark	Finalist	
2013	Ian Doescher	William Shakespeare's Star Wars	Finalist	
2014	Matt de la Peña	The Living	Winner	
2014	Leah Cypess	Death Sworn	Finalist	
2014	A. S. King	Glory O'Brien's History of the Future	Finalist	
2014	John Corey Whaley	Noggin	Finalist	
2014	Alexandra Duncan	Salvage	Finalist	
2014	Marie Rutkoski	The Winner's Curse	Finalist	
2014	Karen Healey	While We Run	Finalist	
2015	Nova Ren Suma	The Walls Around Us	Winner	
2015	Leah Bobet	An Inheritance of Ashes	Finalist	
2015	Laura Ruby	Bone Gap	Finalist	
2015	Robin LaFevers	Mortal Heart	Finalist	
2015	Daniel José Older	Shadowshaper	Finalist	
2015	April Genevieve Tucholke	Slasher Girls & Monster Boys	Finalist	
2015	Mark Alpert	The Six	Finalist	
2016	Amie Kaufman	Illuminae	Winner	
2016	Zoraida Cordova	Labyrinth Lost	Finalist	
2016	A. S. King	Still Life with Tornado	Finalist	
2016	Zetta Elliott	The Door at the Crossroads	Finalist	
2016	Rachel Neumeier	The Keeper of the Mist	Finalist	
2016	Victoria Schwab	This Savage Song	Finalist	
2016	Anna-Marie McLemore	When the Moon was Ours	Finalist	
2017	Neal Shusterman	Scythe	Winner	
2017	Sarah Tolcser	Song of the Current	Finalist	
2017	Emily Lloyd-Jones	The Hearts We Sold	Finalist	
2017	F. T. Lukens	The Rules and Regulations for Mediating Myths & Magic	Finalist	
2017	Adam Silvera	They Both Die at the End	Finalist	
2017	Leigh Bardugo	Wonder Woman: Warbringer	Finalist	
2018	Rachel Hartman	Tess of the Road	Winner	
2018	Justina Ireland	Dread Nation	Finalist	
2018	Somaiya Daud	Mirage	Finalist	
2018	Rebecca Schaeffer	Not Even Bones	Finalist	
2018	Courtney Alameda	Pitch Dark	Finalist	
2018	Katrina Leno	Summer of Salt	Finalist	
2018	Emily Suvada	This Mortal Coil	Finalist	
2019	Rosaria Munda	Fireborne	Winner	
2019	Amie Kaufman	Aurora Rising	Finalist	
2019	Joanna Ruth Meyer	Echo North	Finalist	
2019	Samira Ahmed	Internment	Finalist	
2019	Margaret Rogers	Sorcery of Thorns	Finalist	
2019	Holly Black	The Wicked King	Finalist	
2019	Tochi Onyebuchi	War Girls	Finalist	
2020	Aiden Thomas	Cemetery Boys	Winner	
2020	Patrick Ness	Burn	Finalist	
2020	Darcie Little Badger, illus. by Rovina Cai	Elatsoe	Finalist	
2020	Deonn	Legendborn	Finalist	
2020	Elana K. Arnold	Red Hood	Finalist	
2020	Raquel Vasquez Gilliland	Sia Martinez and the Moonlit Beginning of Everything	Finalist	
2020	Kiersten White	The Guinevere Deception	Finalist	
2021	Margaret Rogerson	Vespertine	Winner	
2021	Jessica Lewis	Bad Witch Burning	Finalist	
2021	Xiran Jay Zhao	Iron Widow	Finalist	
2021	Aden Polydoros	The City Beautiful	Finalist	
2021	Margaret Forna	The Gilded Ones	Finalist	
2021	Anna-Marie McLemore	The Mirror Season	Finalist	
2021	Joan He	The Ones We're Meant to Find	Finalist	
2022	Rebecca Podos	From Dust, a Flame	Winner	
2022	Aislinn Brophy	How to Succeed in Witchcraft	Finalist	
2022	Tiffany D. Jackson	The Weight of Blood	Finalist	
2022	Darcie Little Badger	A Snake Falls to Earth	Finalist	
2022	Axie Oh	The Girl Who Fell Beneath the Sea	Finalist	
2022	Margaret Owen	Little Thieves	Finalist	
2022	Rachel Lynn Solomon	See You Yesterday	Finalist	
2023	Kika Hatzopoulou	Threads That Bind	Winner	
2023	Brianna Bourne	The Half-Life of Love	Finalist	
2023	Amie Kaufman	The Isles of the Gods	Finalist	
2023	Rebecca Ross	Divine Rivals	Finalist	
2023	Nora Shalaway Carpenter	Fault Lines	Finalist	
2023	Lyssa Mia Smith	Revelle	Finalist	
2023	Amy Tintera	The Q	Finalist	
2024	Brooke Archer	Hearts Still Beating	Winner	
2024	LaDarrion Williams	Blood at the Root	Finalist	
2024	Robin Wasley	Dead Things Are Closer Than They Appear	Finalist	
2024	F. T. Lukens	Otherworldly	Finalist	
2024	Anna Bright	The Hedgewitch of Foxhall	Finalist	
2024	Krystal Sutherland	The Invocations	Finalist	
2024	Rob Costello	We Mostly Come Out At Night	Finalist	

== See also ==
- Cybils Awards for Fiction
- Cybils Awards for Graphic Novel
- Cybils Awards for Nonfiction
