= The Book Thief (disambiguation) =

The Book Thief may refer to:

== Literature ==
- The Book Thief, written by Markus Zusak
- The Thief, written by Clive Cussler and Justin Scott

== Film ==
- The Book Thief, a film based on the Zusak book directed by Brian Percival

== See also ==
- The Magic Thief, written by Sarah Prineas
- A Thief in the Night, written by John Cornwell
