= The Song of Glory and Ghost =

2017 book by N. D. Wilson

- Author: N.D. Wilson
- Illustrator: Forrest Dickison
- Language: English
- Genre: Fantasy
- Publisher: Katherine Tegen Books
- Publication date: April 18, 2017
- Publication place: United States
- Media type: Print (Hardcover)
- Pages: 352
- ISBN: 978-0-06-232729-1
- Preceded by: The Legend of Sam Miracle
- Followed by: The Last Of The Lost Boys

Outlaws of Time: The Song of Glory and Ghost is a 2017 young adult novel by N. D. Wilson, published by Katherine Tegen Books. It is the second book in the Outlaws of Time series, being a sequel to The Legend of Sam Miracle.

Common Sense Media called it a "wild, exciting ride, especially for tween readers." Kirkus Reviews pointed out its "free-and-easy use of indigenous tropes," and a Peter Pan theme which "mainly serves to cement some retrograde gender roles."
