= 100 Cupboards =

2007 novel by N. D. Wilson

- The cover of the first edition
- Author: N. D. Wilson
- Language: English
- Series: The 100 Cupboards Trilogy
- Genre: Fantasy/ children's literature
- Published: 2007 (Random House Children's Books)
- Publication place: United States
- Media type: Print
- Pages: 304
- ISBN: 978-0-375-83881-1
- Followed by: Dandelion Fire

100 Cupboards is a 2007 fantasy children's book by N. D. Wilson. The first book in the 100 Cupboards Trilogy, it is followed by Dandelion Fire and The Chestnut King.

== Plot ==
Henry York moves to Henry, Kansas to live with his Uncle Frank, Aunt Dotty, and cousins Penelope, Henrietta, and Anastasia after his parents are abducted while bike trekking in South America. On his first night there, Henry sneaks out of his attic bedroom to go to the bathroom. Instead, he discovers that the door is closed and the light is on. He waits and sees a short man emerge from the bathroom and enter Grandfather's bedroom, a room that has been locked since Grandfather died two years previously.

Another night, the plaster from Henry's attic wall starts coming off, revealing two master lock dials to a hundred little locked cupboards. When they are home alone, Henry and Henrietta discover a key in one of the cupboards they have managed to open, which unlocks the door to Grandfather's bedroom. There they find a journal that has a map of the cupboards.

One morning Henrietta mysteriously disappears, and Henry discovers a journal entry that tells him how the cupboards work. He crawls through a cupboard in Grandfather's room to find Grandfather. After several strange adventures, he finds him in the ballroom of a palace in a ruined city, but they are unable to return until the master locks of the cupboards are set back to their location, and they hide in a dark cupboard. They witness a group of people with wolves called "witch-dogs" kill almost all of the guests at a ball, but they escape. Meanwhile, Uncle Frank attempts to find the two of them while Aunt Dotty tells Penelope and Anastasia that Frank came through the cupboards long ago, and it was their great-grandfather who invented the cupboards and made them work. But Frank is too late when a Witch and her cat emerge from the Endor (8th cupboard) cupboard and stab Frank. The witch is Nimiane, and she has been strengthened by Henry's blood. Aunt Dotty, Penelope, and Anastasia run up to see what's going on, and Aunt Dotty falls into a similar state as Frank. Henry and Henrietta emerge from the cupboard and struggle with the witch, but it is Zeke, a boy who was just dropping by to see if Henry was ready to play baseball, who knocks her out with a swing of his baseball bat. The children push her through the cupboard into an unnamed place, and Dotty and Frank are rushed to the hospital where they are healed.

Henrietta discovers a creature that looks like a small flying rhino in one of the cupboards. This creature, called a raggant, was the one banging against his cupboard, causing it to break through the plaster at the beginning of the book. Uncle Frank tells Henry that he came from one of the cupboards as a child, and the raggant has been sent by someone to find him. Meanwhile, Nimiane has recovered and is plotting in one of the places beyond the cupboards. The book ends when Henry receives another lovely letter from the post office box.

== Main characters ==
- Henry York - The 12-year-old protagonist of the story, Henry lived with his adopted parents, Phil and Ursula, that were kidnapped a short while before the beginning of the book. Then when he has to move in with his aunt and uncle, Henry finds out that he originated from a world beyond the cupboards.
- Frank Willis - Frank Willis was born Francis. He went questing through a portal and into Kansas as a teenager, where he married Dorothy ("Dotty") and had three daughters, Penelope, Henrietta, and Anastasia.
- Henrietta Willis - The middle daughter of Frank and Dorothy, Henrietta is portrayed as stubborn and too curious for her good, with dark curly hair and green eyes.
- Penelope Willis - The oldest Willis daughter is sometimes called "Penny", mostly by Anastasia. She has nearly black hair and often acts as if she is too old for make-believe.
- Anastasia Willis - The youngest Willis daughter, Anastasia is small and wiry for a nine-year-old, freckly with brown hair that "looked like it wanted to be red." She is sometimes rude and pries into everyone's business.
- Dorothy Willis - Called "Dots" by her husband, and "Dotty" by others, she is the sister of Ursula, Henry's adopted mother.

== Film ==
Beloved Pictures acquired the rights to a film adaption of the novel in the summer of 2010.
