= The Girl with Borrowed Wings =

2012 novel by Rinsai Rossetti

- First edition
- Author: Rinsai Rossetti
- Language: English
- Genre: Fantasy, Young Adult, Romance, Paranormal
- Published: July 24, 2012
- Publisher: Dial Press
- Publication place: United States
- ISBN: 0803735669

The Girl with Borrowed Wings is the debut novel of Rinsai Rossetti. Written while she was in her teens, the Girl with Borrowed Wings was published in 2012 by Dial Press.

== Synopsis ==
The Girl with Borrowed Wings begins with Frenenquer, a young expat girl who lives with her parents in the Oasis. Bound by her father's stifling rules and expectations, Frenenquer begins to rebel after finding the half dead body of a shape shifter. After naming him Sangris, they begin to fly off, exploring the world. However, when her father begins to impose increasingly restricting rule and Sangris begins expressing emotions beyond that of a friend, Frenenquer reacts and rejects Sangris, giving into her father's laws.

== Reception ==
The book has been widely reviewed. It was nominated for the Monica Hughes Award for Science Fiction and Fantasy in 2013.
