= Leepike Ridge =

2007 novel by N.D. Wilson

- Author: N.D. Wilson
- Illustrator: None
- Language: English
- Genre: Adventure
- Publisher: Random House
- Publication date: May 22, 2007
- Publication place: United States
- Media type: Print (Hardcover)
- Pages: 240
- ISBN: 978-0-375-83873-6

Leepike Ridge is N.D. Wilson's debut novel, published in 2007. It is an adventure novel written for children.

== Plot ==
The plot of the book involves theories of Chinese (through Zheng He) and Phoenician discoveries of America. It involves a boy named Tom who, by accident, is dragged down into an underground river. Much of the book is focused on him getting out of the subterranean world in which he has been trapped.

== Reception ==
Leepike Ridge has received generally good reviews. It is considered to be one of N.D. Wilson's best novels. Kirkus Book Reviews described it as a "literate, sometimes humorous page-turner in the classic tradition." Reading to Kids said of the book, "Think Mark Twain with a contemporary and utterly captivating twist."
