= The Legend of Sam Miracle =

Book by N. D. Wilson

- Author: N.D. Wilson
- Illustrator: Forrest Dickison
- Language: English
- Genre: Fantasy
- Publisher: HarperCollins
- Publication date: April 19, 2016
- Publication place: United States
- Media type: Print (Hardcover)
- Pages: 336
- ISBN: 978-0-062-32726-0
- Followed by: The Song of Glory and Ghost

Outlaws of Time: The Legend of Sam Miracle is a 2016 young adult novel by N. D. Wilson. It is published by HarperCollins.

The Legend of Sam Miracle is the first book of a series which follows a lead character, Sam, "a foster kid with two bad arms who seeks refuge from his life in dreams." Sam finds he has the ability to bend and shift time (called "time walking").

According to Publishers Weekly, the book has an "off-kilter perspective".

The next book in the Outlaws of Time series, The Song of Glory and Ghost, was published in 2017.
