= Dandelion Fire =

2009 novel by N.D. Wilson

- Author: N.D. Wilson
- Illustrator: Jeff Nentrup
- Language: English
- Series: 100 Cupboards trilogy
- Genre: Fantasy
- Publisher: Random House
- Publication date: May 1, 2009
- Publication place: United States
- Media type: Print (Paperback)
- Pages: 480
- ISBN: 978-0-375-93883-2
- Preceded by: 100 Cupboards
- Followed by: The Chestnut King

Dandelion Fire is a 2009 children's fantasy novel by N. D. Wilson. It is the second installment in the 100 Cupboards trilogy and is followed by the concluding novel in the series, The Chestnut King.

== Plot ==
Whereas the first book in the series is set primarily in the real world and involves the discovery of the cupboard portals, a significant portion of the second book takes place in the worlds inside the cupboards.

Despite the restriction the Willises had put on Henry and Henrietta to opening any more cupboards, Henry and Henrietta's curiosity got the best of them. Unfortunately, while Henrietta was searching for the skeleton key, which she was hiding from her little sibling, Anastasia, Henry was struck by a bolt of lightning and lost consciousness. Luckily, even though Henry was struck blind after the incident, he was otherwise uninjured with nothing but a scar on the palm of his hand. Henrietta was skeptical and accused Henry of faking his blindness. Henry was immediately rushed to a hospital, but his symptoms weren't as severe as those experienced by a victim struck by an authentic lightning bolt. On the other hand, faithful Richard assured them Henry would never exaggerate or fail in his courage, so he must truly be injured. After a bumpy ride home, Henry was left alone to rest in his room.

When Henry woke up, his skin felt flaky, and the burn in his jaw, caused by the blood of Nimiane, singed his cranium. He then started to devise a plan involving Richard, instead of Henrietta, to travel with him through the cupboards in a search for his birth parents. While he was explaining his plan to Richard, Henrietta eavesdropped on their conversation. She could not but feel betrayed. She decided to get back at Henry by grabbing Richard as he made his way through the landing the next time he came. Unfortunately, both of their schemes failed, as Henry was abducted by Darius, an evil wizard. Impatiently, Henrietta waited for Richard until she was determined to go through the door from her grandfather's room to the secret realm herself. There, she was kidnapped by two short but extremely strong men and was taken to Magdalene, queen of the FitzFaeren. Magdalene asked Henrietta to retrieve the three stolen items from her deceased grandfather, telling her that if she refuses, Henrietta will be held as a prisoner as long as the objects used to thwart the evil Nimiane are regained. Henrietta escaped the queen's grasp by flinging herself out of a window. Cold and hungry, Henrietta followed a stream to Eli FitzFaeren's house.

Henry was to bear Darius's mark, so Darius and Henry can be branded by the same symbol. The surgeon who was supposed to stigmatize them together felt pity for Henry and let Henry escape by drugging himself. As Darius entered the room, he was outraged by the boy's breakaway, though Henry was still remained the room, only concealed by the door. Darius supposed Henry had retreated back to Kansas, through the dimension he was from. Darius uses Richard as a ransom to the Willises for Henry. Meanwhile, Henry tries to slide through the pipe of the building. On the last flight of pipes, Henry falls, flying through the air, unable to cling onto anything sturdy. When he regained consciousness, he was on a bed in a draped room. Sitting in front of him are a kind couple who rescued him from the incident. After, Henry is nurtured back to health, he ventures to the post office in order to go back through a cupboard and return to Kansas. But, as he arrives, nobody is present in the house, and he finds a note from the family about their departure.

Henry decides to re-enter the cupboard to find the others, and is recognized by a fairie named Frank as the son of a hero named Mordecai. When enemy faeries put the Hendry on trial and decide to kill him, Frank the faerie helps Henry escape, taking him to Caleb, where Henry is reunited with Henrietta and the rest of his Kansas family, and learns that his Uncle Frank is actually Caleb’s brother. Henry also meets his real mother and grandmother, learns that their city is under siege, and is christened with the name Macabee. His christening provides enough magic to free his true father, Mordecai, from a spell that had him trapped for years. But the family reunion is cut short as the brothers Frank, Caleb and Mordecai return to battle, knowing that Nimiane and Darius are near. Henry and Henrietta return to Kansas and locate a magic arrow, which is a talisman previously stolen by their grandfather, which they bring back to FitzFaeren, where it is used by Caleb to destroy Darius. The book concludes with Henry staying with his newfound family in FitzFaeren, and by way of the cupboards they continue to visit Uncle Frank’s family.

== Main characters ==
- Henry York - The 12-year-old protagonist of the story, Henry lived with his adopted parents, Phil and Ursula, who were kidnapped a short while before the beginning of the book. Then when he has to move in with his aunt and uncle, Henry finds out that he originated from a world beyond the cupboards in a city by the sea by the name of Hylfing, which is under siege at the time of his arrival. He is a seventh son of a seventh son, a Green Man, sort of like a wizard, each represented by a plant. His plant is the dandelion, thus the title: Dandelion Fire. He is later Christened by a priest and his grandmother Henry York Maccabee. his true father's name is Mordecai Westmore, and his mother's name is Hyacinth.
- Henrietta Willis - The middle daughter of Frank and Dorothy, Henrietta is portrayed as stubborn and too curious for her own good, with dark curly hair and green eyes.
- Frank Willis - Frank Willis was born Francis. He went questing through a portal and into Kansas as a teenager, where he married Dorothy ("Dotty") and had three daughters, Penelope, Henrietta, and Anastasia.
- Darius - Darius was born Fred, not Frederick, but Fred. He ran away and became a Green Man, similar to Henry. His brand is Mushrooms-Poison. Partway through the book he attempted to falsely christen Henry, making him his son. This encounter leaves him with a tree shaped scar, possibly foretelling the arrival of Monmouth. Darius was killed by Caleb with the Arrow of Chance. When he died, where he was standing was covered with scorched mushrooms. He is named after king Darius I of Macedonia.
- Mordecai Westmore - Mordecai Westmore was born seventh son to Amram Iothric and Anastasia (Henry's Grandmother Anastasia). While young he traveled to Endor to fight Nimiane with his older twin Caleb. After Imprisoning Nimiane, He left for his home town of Hylfing. where he had seven sons, the three of which were killed, the last, Henry, was a green man as well. His brand is Grapevines.
- Caleb - Twin brother of Mordecai Westmore, Son of Amram Iothric and Anastasia the elder. While young traveled to Endor "with a bow a big as himself". He used to be the Mayor of Hylfing but he gave up the title to Frank, his older brother. As described in the book, he is more like a male Artemis; he excels at archery and has a special bond with animals.
- Franklin Fat-Faerie - When Henry was captured by the wizards to take him to the emperor, Frank, along with Monmouth, a young wizard and a green man, fought off the wizards. He tried to assist Henry on his escape out of the Faerie Mound.
- Eli - Eli knew about the cupboards and had met the grandfather. Henrietta tried to capture him .
