= Monica Hughes Award =

Canadian literary award (2012–2016)

The Monica Hughes Award for Science Fiction and Fantasy was a Canadian literary award presented to science fiction and fantasy writing for children and adolescents. Presented from 2012 to 2016, the award was launched by the Canadian Children's Book Centre, sponsored by HarperCollins Canada, and honoured British-Canadian children's writer Monica Hughes. To be eligible for the award, books must have been "an original work in English, aimed at readers ages eight to 18 and a Canadian or a permanent resident of Canada". Winners received $5,000 CAD.

== Recipients ==
Award winners and finalists
Year	Title	Author	Result	Ref.
2012	What Happened to Serenity?	PJ Sarah Collins	Winner	
2012	Tempestuous	Lesley Livingston	Finalist	
2012	Peter Nimble and His Fantastic Eyes	Jonathan Auxier	Finalist	
2012	Hunted	Cheryl Rainfield	Finalist	
2012	Dreamline	Nicole Luiken	Finalist	
2013	Seraphina	Rachel Hartman	Winner	
2013	Shadows Cast by Stars	Catherine Knutsson	Finalist	
2013	Rebel Heart	Moira Young	Finalist	
2013	Island of Doom	Arthur Slade	Finalist	
2013	The Girl With Borrowed Wings	Rinsai Rosetti	Finalist	
2014	Curse of the Dream Witch	Allan Stratton	Winner	
2014	The Stowaways	Meghan Marentette, illus. by Dean Griffiths	Finalist	
2014	Sorrow's Knot	Erin Bow	Finalist	
2014	Slated	Teri Terry	Finalist	
2014	Rush	Eve Silver	Finalist	
2015	The Night Gardener	Jonathan Auxier	Winner	
2015	The Story of Owen: Dragon Slayer of Trondheim	S. J. Laidlaw	Finalist	
2015	Sea of Shadows	Kelley Armstrong	Finalist	
2015	The Nethergrim	Matthew Jobin	Finalist	
2015	The Boundless	Kenneth Oppel	Finalist	
2016	The Scorpion Rules	Erin Bow	Winner	
2016	The Unquiet	Mikaela Everett	Finalist	
2016	A Thousand Nights	E. K. Johnston	Finalist	
2016	Nest	Kenneth Oppel, illus. by Jon Klassen	Finalist	
2016	Clover's Luck	Kallie George, illus. by Alexandra Boiger	Finalist	
