= The Winner's Crime =

First edition (publ. FSG)

The Winner's Crime is the second novel of The Winner’s Trilogy, written by Marie Rutkoski. The Winner's Crime is a story about a girl called Kestrel, the daughter of a soldier. It is fantasy novel with a mystery. The Huffington Post rated it as the best young adult sequel book of 2015.
