= The Weight of Blood =

2022 novel by Tiffany D. Jackson

- Author: Tiffany D. Jackson
- Language: English
- Genre: YA, Horror
- Publisher: HarperCollins
- Publication date: September 6, 2022
- Publication place: United States of America
- Awards: Bram Stoker Award for Best Young Adult Novel, nominee
- ISBN: 978-0-06-302914-9

The Weight of Blood is a 2022 young adult horror novel by Tiffany D. Jackson. Set in the fictional "sundown town" of Springville, Georgia, the story follows Maddy Washington, a biracial high school senior who has been forced by her racist father to hide her ethnicity by passing as white and straightening her hair. When a rainstorm leads to her hair reverting to its natural form, her heritage is revealed and a viral bullying video exposes the racism at Springville High. In a bid to salvage the school’s reputation, popular and high-achieving Wendy Quinn convinces her Black football star boyfriend to take Maddy to prom. However, a revenge prank pulled by one of her bullies on prom night humiliates Maddy, setting off a chain of events that destroy the town and leave her classmates dead.

The book is a retelling of Stephen King's 1974 horror novel Carrie, that elaborates on its themes in a 21st–century context. Its narrative follows the epistolary style of Carrie, while also adding sections of third-person omniscient action sequences in between transcripts of news articles and podcasts about the events of the novel from the future. It deals with themes of US racism, high-school bullying, and modern witchcraft.

Jackson has said that she wanted to honor King's work while at the same time subverting the message it puts first to provoke thought and discussion amongst her readers.

== Plot ==
The novel alternates between the present day, when a podcast series is released, detailing the events of a massive fire at a prom in the small Georgia town of Springville, and 2014, when the incident occurred and what led up to it. Half the town was killed and according to survivors, the perpetrator was Madison “Maddy” Washington. Maddy, a shy biracial high school senior, lives in Springville with her abusive father, Thomas, who has forced her to pass as white for the majority of her life. She is frequently bullied by her classmates due to her odd behavior as well as dressing up in an old-fashioned manner.

One day during gym class, Maddy is doing a track running exercise with her classmates when rain begins to fall. Despite her attempts to prevent it, her hair reverts to its natural form, drawing attention from her bullies, most notably Jules Marshall and her best friend Wendy Quinn, who mock and throw pencils at Maddy, which ends up triggering a then-unknown telekinetic event that causes her to raise the chairs and tables off the ground and destroy the windows of the classroom. The history teacher, Mrs. Morgan alerts the principal of the bullying, and Maddy is removed from her class for the rest of the school year. When Thomas finds out about what happened, he beats Maddy and locks her in a closet.

Unbeknownst to Maddy and her classmates, a video of the incident is recorded and goes viral once it's released. Though she feels guilty, Wendy worries about the video ruining her reputation. Wanting to put the school in a positive light, she suggests having the upcoming prom be integrated after decades of having them segregated. The seniors vote and eventually decide to combine both proms. Days later, Jules arrives at a senior week rally dressed in blackface pretending to be Maddy, angering Wendy's Black boyfriend, football star Kendrick "Kenny" Scott. Jules is suspended for the rest of the school year and her college acceptance to Texas A&M is revoked. However, she shows no remorse for her actions and accuses Maddy of ruining her life.

Maddy discovers her telekinetic abilities and begins to practice them. She finds a journal that belonged to her mother, where she learns she may not have died in childbirth as she had always believed. She also warns Maddy not to listen to her father's advice or else she might lose control of her powers. Wendy, in another move to look selfless, asks Kenny to take Maddy to prom. Reluctantly, he agrees. Maddy at first suspects that the invite is a prank due to years of bullying but she eventually believes Kenny and agrees to go. Jules confronts Wendy when she finds out about this and they get in a fight, ending their friendship in the process. When Maddy tells Thomas about the prom, he beats her and she demonstrates her powers to him. Jules, wanting revenge on Maddy, has one of her friends rig the prom election while she and her boyfriend Brady break into her father's store and steal cans of paint.

On the night of the prom, Maddy is picked up by Kenny. Meanwhile, a protest, led by Kenny's younger sister Kali, is held outside the country club. Maddy and Kenny are crowned king and queen but when they get onstage, Jules drenches her with white paint before she and Brady leave, running past the protesters. Kenny takes Maddy away and tries to get into the country club to confront the perpetrators, but a police officer refuses to let him pass the protestors. A girl trips into Kenny, causing him to trip into the officer, who beats him unconscious.

Believing Kenny is dead, Maddy unleashes her power and causes chaos. She telekinetically kills and injures most of the police officers. She enters the country club, where she kills everyone except for Jules. She derails a train to run over a group of people who try to shoot her, resulting in the power going out in town. She then burns down her father's antique store, sets the rest of the town on fire, and kills anyone trying to stop her. Kenny is revealed to be alive and he encourages Wendy to go help Maddy. Maddy arrives back home where Thomas tries to shoot her but when she stops him, he turns the gun on himself. Wendy arrives and helps Maddy flee the town so she can move to South Carolina and live with her mom.

Kenny escapes from the hospital and presumably goes to be with Maddy. Jules is among the people who survive Maddy's destruction though she ends up losing her arm, while Wendy is forced to leave the country and change her name as a result of people blaming her for what happened. Following the events of prom night, Springville becomes a ghost town.

== Reception ==
The book received starred review from Publishers Weekly, the School Library Journal, and Kirkus Reviews. Kirkus Reviews stated that "Jackson’s expert reshaping of this tale highlights the genuine horrors of both internalized and externalized anti-Blackness, as with the way she weaponizes Maddy’s father’s hot comb as a symbol of terror and subjugation."

The School Library Journal additionally gave a starred review to the audiobook adaption.

== Awards ==
Awards and honors for The Weight of Blood
Year	Award/Honor	Result	Ref.
2022	Bram Stoker Award for Best Young Adult Novel	Nominated	
2022	Cybils Awards for Speculative Fiction for Young Adults	Nominated	
2022	Publishers Weekly Best Young Adult Books	Included	
2023	Amazing Audiobooks for Young Adults	Top Ten	
