= Hello Ninja =

- Created by: N. D. Wilson
- Based on: Hello Ninja by N. D. Wilson
- Developed by: Mark Palmer
- Written by: Susan Kim
- Directed by: Michael Dowding
- Voices of: Lukas Engel; Zoey Stewart; Mayumi Yoshida; Sam Vincent
- Composers: Brian Carson; Dave Bassett
- Country of origin: United States
- Original language: English
- No. of seasons: 4
- No. of episodes: 39

Production
- Executive producers: N. D. Wilson; Aaron Rench; Grace Ledding; Mark Palmer; Jennifer Twiner McCarron; Matthew Berkowitz
- Producer: Linda Lamontagne
- Editor: Andrew McSherry
- Running time: 11–14 minutes
- Production company: Gorilla Poet Productions

Original release
- Network: Netflix
- Release: November 1, 2019 – January 19, 2021

Hello Ninja is an American children's animated television series based on the book of the same name by N.D. Wilson airing on Netflix.

The show premiered on November 1, 2019. Its second season was released on April 24, 2020. The third season was released on September 6, 2020. A fourth season was released on January 19, 2021.

== Premise ==
Hello Ninja revolves around Wesley (Lukas Engel), his best friend Georgie (Zoey Siewert) & his orange cat Pretzel. Wesley's super-wise grandma, Baa-Chan (AKA Kuma the Dragon) (Mayumi Yoshida), teaches them life lessons that all "ninjas" should learn.

== Cast ==
- Lukas Engel as Wesley
- Zoey Siewert as Georgie
- Sam Vincent as Pretzel
- Mayumi Yoshida as Baa-Chan
- Shannon Chan-Kent as Mom
- Vincent Tong as Dad
- Mayumi Yoshida as Gen
- Travis Turner as Zeke

== Episodes ==
=== Series overview ===
Season	Episodes	Originally released
1	10	November 1, 2019
2	10	April 24, 2020
3	9	July 10, 2020
4	10	January 19, 2021

=== Season 1 (2019) ===
No. overall	No. in season	Title	Directed by	Written by	Original release date
1	1	"Cottontail Ninja"	Michael Dowding	Mark Palmer	November 1, 2019
2	2	"Lava Leap"	Michael Dowding	Mark Palmer	November 1, 2019
3	3	"Where Eagles Dare"	Michael Dowding	Eugene Son	November 1, 2019
4	4	"Temple of Bingo"	Michael Dowding	Adam Wilson & Melanie Wilson LaBracio	November 1, 2019
5	5	"Shadow Ninja"	Michael Dowding	C. James Carter	November 1, 2019
6	6	"Proof is in Pretzel"	Michael Dowding	Jennifer Skelly	November 1, 2019
7	7	"Hound in Ninjaville"	Michael Dowding	Roger Eschbacher	November 1, 2019
8	8	"The Kitchen Mission"	Michael Dowding	Sarah Eisenberg & Becky Wangberg	November 1, 2019
9	9	"Coming Clean"	Michael Dowding	Eugene Son	November 1, 2019
10	10	"Bonsai Surprise"	Michael Dowding	Adam Wilson & Melanie Wilson LaBracio	November 1, 2019

=== Season 2 (2020) ===
No. overall	No. in season	Title	Directed by	Written by	Original release date
11	1	"Market of Doom"	Michael Dowding	Sarah Eisenberg & Becky Wangberg	April 24, 2020
12	2	"Treasure Split"	Michael Dowding	Jennifer Skelly	April 24, 2020
13	3	"Under the Couch"	Michael Dowding	Eugene Son	April 24, 2020
14	4	"Wild, Wild Wesley"	Michael Dowding	Adam Wilson & Melanie Wilson LaBracio	April 24, 2020
15	5	"Jungle's End"	Michael Dowding	Jennifer Skelly	April 24, 2020
16	6	"The Way to Dreamland"	Michael Dowding	David Skelly	April 24, 2020
17	7	"Lemonade Stand"	Michael Dowding	Alex Mack	April 24, 2020
18	8	"Beat the Heat"	Michael Dowding	Adam Wilson & Melanie Wilson LaBracio	April 24, 2020
19	9	"Stick to It"	Michael Dowding	Roger Eschbacher	April 24, 2020
20	10	"Ninja vs. Ninja"	Michael Dowding	Chris Walsh	April 24, 2020

=== Season 3 (2020) ===
No. overall	No. in season	Title	Directed by	Written by	Original release date
21	1	"Welcome to Japan"	Michael Dowding	Allen Markuze	September 6, 2020
22	2	"Hotaru no Hikari"	Michael Dowding	David Skelly	September 6, 2020
23	3	"Heart of the Dragon"	Michael Dowding	Susan Kim	September 6, 2020
24	4	"Pretzel Goes to Sea"	Michael Dowding	Sarah Eisenberg & Becky Wangberg	September 6, 2020
25	5	"Valley of the Giants"	Michael Dowding	Roger Eschbacher	September 6, 2020
26	6	"Be the Leaves"	Michael Dowding	Alex Mack	September 6, 2020
27	7	"Sno Fun"	Michael Dowding	C. James Carter	September 6, 2020
28	8	"In Cold Pursuit"	Michael Dowding	Chris Walsh	September 6, 2020
29	9	"Sneaky Seed Snatcher"	Michael Dowding	Jiro C. Okada	September 6, 2020

=== Season 4 (2021) ===
No. overall	No. in season	Title	Directed by	Written by	Original release date
30	1	"A Bike Story"	Michael Dowding	Roger Eschbacher	January 19, 2021
31	2	"No Cat Left Behind"	Michael Dowding	Chris Walsh	January 19, 2021
32	3	"Dance, Dance Ninja"	Michael Dowding	Alex Mack	January 19, 2021
33	4	"The Great Ninja Train"	Michael Dowding	Sarah Eisenberg & Becky Wangberg	January 19, 2021
34	5	"The Ballad of Gen"	Michael Dowding	C. James Carter	January 19, 2021
35	6	"Let's Talk Space"	Michael Dowding	Roger Eschbacher	January 19, 2021
36	7	"Quiet Game"	Michael Dowding	Alex Mack	January 19, 2021
37	8	"Golfball Ninjas"	Michael Dowding	Chris Walsh	January 19, 2021
38	9	"Treasure Hunt"	Michael Dowding	Roger Eschbacher	January 19, 2021
39	10	"Enter the Kitten"	Michael Dowding	Chris Walsh	January 19, 2021

== Production ==
On July 22, 2019 Netflix announced that it had given a greenlight production order to Hello Ninja with Mark Palmer on board as showrunner, Susan Kim as story editor and Michael Dowding as the director.

== Release ==
Hello Ninja was released on November 1, 2019 on Netflix. Season 2 was released on April 24, 2020. On May 18, 2020 it was announced the series had been renewed for a third season which released September 6, 2020. On July 10, 2020 it was announced the series had been renewed for a fourth season which released on January 19, 2021.
