= The River Thief =

- Directed by: N.D. Wilson
- Written by: N.D. Wilson
- Produced by: Aaron Rench; N.D. Wilson
- Starring: Joel Courtney; Raleigh Cain; Paul Johansson; Tommy Cash; Bas Rutten
- Cinematography: Andy Patch; Dane Wilson
- Edited by: Dane Saxon
- Music by: Eli Beaird
- Production company: Gorilla Poet Productions
- Distributed by: Freestyle Digital Media
- Release date: October 14, 2016
- Country: United States
- Language: English

The River Thief is a 2016 American teen crime drama written, directed, and co-produced by novelist N.D. Wilson. The film stars Joel Courtney as Diz, a roving burglar who takes a shine to a small town waitress, Selah, played by Raleigh Cain. The film follows Diz as he tries to steal the affection of Selah and deal with the fallout from his biggest heist yet. The cast includes Paul Johansson, Bas Rutten, and Tommy Cash.

Filmed for $400,000 over the course of ten days with the script completed just 48 hours before production began, The River Thief is the first feature produced by Gorilla Poets (Wilson and co-producer Aaron Rench).

The River Thief received negative reviews. The Los Angeles Times, for example, called it "hackneyed" and "heavy-handed".
