= The Chestnut King =

2010 novel by N. D. Wilson

- Author: N.D. Wilson
- Illustrator: Jeff Nentrup
- Language: English
- Series: 100 Cupboards trilogy
- Genre: Fantasy
- Publisher: Random House
- Publication date: March 1, 2010
- Publication place: United States
- Media type: Print (Paperback)
- Pages: 483
- ISBN: 978-0-375-83885-9
- Preceded by: Dandelion Fire

The Chestnut King is a 2010 fantasy novel written by N.D. Wilson. It is the third and final installment to the 100 Cupboards trilogy, and follows 100 Cupboards and Dandelion Fire. Focus on the Family says the book's "readability age range" is 9–12 years old.

== Background ==
When 12-year-old Henry York went to stay with his cousins in Henry, Kansas, he never imagined the trips he'd be taking. The trilogy began in the first book 100 Cupboards, where Henry found 99 cupboards hidden behind his bedroom wall. Each led to a different world. He inadvertently released an imprisoned witch-queen named Nimiane, who is determined to rule the cupboard worlds. Henry fought off Nimiane.

In the second book of the series, Dandelion Fire Henry gets struck by lightning after seeing what he thinks is a dandelion glowing with fire. Bad things begin to happen to him, such as going blind, and the inability open his eyes. They fix the problem by taking Henry to a doctor. Henry finds a portal that he hasn't been to yet and in there is where he meets Franklin Fat Faerie and Monmouth. After almost being tossed into the ocean, he is kept hostage in a castle of faeries. Fat Frank breaks him and Monmouth out but the three run into wizards and fingerlings.

After Henry loses Grandfather's journal, he finds a house and is saved after trying to get in. He collapses, but is taken in by his mother, who tells him all about the family. Henry finds out that he has two sisters, Isa and Una, and two uncles besides Frank Willis, James and Caleb. Henry also finds out that he is the seventh son of Mordecai, which means that he is a green child. A green child is the seventh born child in the family. Each of them has their own mark. Henry's mark is a dandelion, Monmouth's is an Aspen tree, and Mordecai's is a grape. Later, he gets christened after finding out that the green man in his letters is his father. After he gets christened the feast gets interrupted by someone. Henry throws a knife at the person intruding, thinking it is Darius, the person who inflicted a scar on him. This causes the prison holding Mordecai to break. Mordecai is freed after being imprisoned by the faeren.

== Plot ==
In The Chestnut King, Henry's Aunt Dotty, Uncle Frank and cousins from Kansas now live in Badon Hill as well. Nimiane continues to stalk Henry. She wants his blood, as it will increase her power. The scar she previously inflicted on his face continues to grow and rot. Henry's father, Mordecai, fears the wound will kill Henry unless they can vanquish the undying witch-queen soon.

Soldiers sent by the emperor of this world demand that Mordecai come with them across the sea. The emperor wants Mordecai to answer to charges that his family helped free Nimiane. Mordecai is more concerned about destroying the witch-queen and saving his son than his defense. He says he will respond to the emperor once he has completed his mission. He leaves for Endor, where Nimiane resides.

In response to Mordecai's disobedience to the emperor, the soldiers capture his family, including Uncle Frank, Henry's mom and his cousins. Then they set fire to the family's house, leaving Henry's cousin Henrietta and grandmother inside. Henry helps his grandmother and Henrietta escape through a cupboard portal that takes them back to Kansas. There, they enlist the help of Henry's baseball buddy, Zeke. Leaving Henry's grandmother with Zeke's mom, the three children travel through the cupboard leading to Endor.

The kids find themselves in a crypt with Nimiane's relative, a shape-shifting creature called Nimroth (the maker of the blackstar). Nimiane has 10 henchmen, whom she controls with her mind. They're called fingerlings because they have fingers attached to the back of their heads. Coradin, the lead fingerling, follows Henry on his journeys through various worlds. Coradin and the fingerlings pursue the children through the underground tombs of Endor until Henry helps Zeke and Henrietta return to the attic in Kansas. Henry returns to Endor, finds his father and Uncle Caleb, gathers old manuscripts that may help them find the witch-queen's secrets and transports the papers back to Kansas.

Back in Badon Hill, Fat Frank — an incompetent fairy who has actually been stripped of his fairyhood — rescues three of the children in Henry's family. A group of fairies locates Frank and takes him and the children to the Chestnut King so Frank can answer for his un-fairylike conduct. Meanwhile, Uncle Frank and the other captured family members find themselves on a rough and unpleasant sea voyage.

Henry finds entry into the fairy world, where he seeks the help of the Chestnut King. The king makes a bargain with him: He will help Henry save his family and vanquish the witch-queen if Henry will take over as Chestnut King. Feeling cornered, Henry agrees. Henry is reunited with the family members that were with Fat Frank. Coradin and the witch-queen's other henchmen capture Uncle Frank's group, forcing Henry to confront Nimiane in her throne room. Henry disables the witch-queen just before she would have destroyed Henry and his loved ones. Instead of becoming the king himself, Henry makes Fat Frank the new Chestnut King.

== Main characters ==
- Henry York - The 12-year-old protagonist of the story, Henry lived with his adopted parents, Phil and Ursula, who were kidnapped a short while before the beginning of the book. Then when he has to move in with his aunt and uncle, Henry finds out that he originated from a world beyond the cupboards in a city by the sea by the name of Hylfing, which is under siege at the time of his arrival. He Is a seventh son, a green man, sort of like a wizard, each represented by a plant. His plant is the dandelion, thus the title: Dandelion Fire. He is later Christened by a priest and his grandmother Henry York Maccabee. his true father's name is Mordecai Westmore, and his mother's name is Hyacinth. In "The Chestnut King" he is offered to become the Chestnut King by Nudd the previous Chestnut King, which he refuses in favor of Fat Frank.
- Nimiane - The main antagonist, Nimiane is the witch from Cupboard # 8, Endor. She is an undying witch, and is seen as a shriveled, eyeless, hairless husk. She can see through the eyes of a servant cat who is set loose at the end of 100 Cupboards, who often is a symbol of her in Henry's vision, in "The Chestnut King", she dies by Henry Forcing her blood, as well as some of his magic, into her.
- Frank Willis - Frank Willis was born Francis. He went questing through a portal and into Kansas as a teenager, where he married Dorothy ("Dotty") and had three daughters, Penelope, Henrietta, and Anastasia. His father is Amram Iothric, and His mother is Anastasia.
- Henrietta Willis - The middle daughter of Frank and Dorothy, Henrietta is portrayed as stubborn and too curious for her own good, with dark curly hair and green eyes. However, halfway through the novel, in a hostage situation with Coradin, Henry is forced to cut her hair very short and she complains throughout the novel about it. Though she is a very adventurous person.
- Penelope Willis - The oldest Willis daughter is sometimes called "Penny," mostly by Anastasia. She has nearly black hair and often acts as if she is too old for make-believe.
- Anastasia Willis - The youngest Willis daughter, Anastasia is small and wiry for a nine-year-old, freckly with brown hair that "looked like it wanted to be red." She is sometimes rude and pries into everyone's business. Not to be confused with Anastasia, Mother of Caleb, Mordecai, and Frank
- Dorothy Willis - Called "Dots" by her husband, and "Dotty" by others, she is the sister of Ursula, Henry's adopted mother.
- Zeke Johnson - A boy who often plays baseball with Henry. Anastasia often teases Penelope for having a crush on him. He comes to the rescue at the end of 100 Cupboards and knocks out the witch Nimiane with his baseball bat.
- Coradin - Chief Fingerling. Coradin has three notches in his left ear, dark skin, and black oily hair knotted over the finger sprouting out of his head he wears a helmet that connects to his belt which makes him and his Fingerlings invincible (as well as unable to commit suicide). He carries two swords similar in description to an Estoc, one of which is then stolen by Henry Maccabee to use as his own, it is relatively long, since Henry has to strap it to his back. Coradin kills himself in Dumarre right before Nimiane perishes.
- Grandmother Anastasia - Very little is known about Grandmother Anastasia, her parents for example. It is known that she married Amram Iothric and had at least seven children, some of which include Mordecai Westmore, his twin brother Caleb, and Frank. It is probable that she is extremely powerful, in Henry's dreams, removing Nimiane's blood from his jaw. Anastasia is a dream walker, appearing in others' dreams to communicate. She is blind.

== Settings ==
=== On Earth ===
- Henry, Kansas - A fictional city in Kansas where The Willis Family lives.

=== On The Fictional Planet ===
- Dumarre - Capital city in a vast empire, title of emperor is: Lord of the eastern and western seas, Lord of all the Fishes and the Peoples and the planets. the location of Dumarre is right in the middle of an isthmus that connects the Northern and Southern Continents. The flag is, three serpents braided into one head, symbolizing the appearance of the empire in three continents and all braiding into Dumarre. with alternating red and white background and snake.
- Hylfing - A city by the sea on the Northern Continent. Hylfing is on one side of a bay that points south, towards Dumarre. There are two legends of the city's founding, one being that two stone unicorns were carved, and an inn and a city built around it. another of the inn being built by a castaway and the city built around it. Major occupations in Hylfing are farmers and fishermen. the city is led by a Lord Mayor earliest known was, Amram Iothric then, Caleb, then Frank, then presumably Henry Maccabee.
- Glaston's Barrow - Realm of the Chestnut King, It is a Country/Continent with a capital by the same name. Founded by a mysterious person by the name of Glaston, it is the second faerie kingdom. The title of the Chestnut King is: Lord of the Second World, monarch of Glaston's Barrow, master of the earthen winds, protector of true Faeren, bane of traitors and folly-coddlers. The line of Monarchs is not a Dynasty but the next Monarch is chosen by the present Monarch with the exception of Glaston, Clovis, and Henry Maccabee. The line of Monarchs is: Glaston, Clovis, Nudd, Henry Maccabee who gave up the title in favor of Fat Frank.
- Endor - Endor is presumably a continent, much information of it is missing, and it is only known to be reached by Cupboard #8, and possibly by sea, it is revealed to be south of Hylfing. The royal Heirloom is the Blackstar. Unlike Glaston's Barrow, Endor is a dynasty. The known line is: Nimroth and Nimiane.

== Themes ==
=== Identity ===
After receiving his name in the second book, Henry faces the challenge of living up to the destiny given to him along with his name. He also struggles to understand his place as part of his new family. As he forms this new identity as a powerful magic user and a son and brother, he has to reconcile who he used to be with who he has become. This theme is shown powerfully in the climactic final battle with Nimiane, when Henry uses his pitching skills to throw the Blackstar. It is the combination of his magic and his baseball skills learned in Kansas that allows him to succeed, showing the melding of his old and new identities.

=== Strength ===
Each character demonstrates their own kind of strength, whether it be the Green Men with their plant magic, or the more mundane characters like Henrietta and her family. Henry comes to understand that his strength, represented by his dandelion magic, is based on the ability to put down roots and stubbornly survive whatever is thrown at him. Nimiane has no strength of her own, so she has to steal strength from others, leading to her downfall.

=== Death and immortality ===
According to Kirkus Reviews, the central conflict that Henry faces is "How do you kill something that cannot die?" From the beginning of the book, Henry is faced with the reality that if he cannot stop Nimiane, he will die. At the same time, he sees death firsthand with the death of his grandmother. He comes to terms with this, only to be faced with the Chestnut King's offer of immortality. His experiences with Nimiane and the other immortal creatures that he meets teach him about the corruption and lack of empathy that come with immortality, leading him to first risk his life to defeat the witch and afterwards reject immortality in favor of a mortal life.

== Notes ==
- The Chestnut King. Kirkus Reviews. 2009;77(24):1294. Accessed May 12, 2025. https://search.ebscohost.com/login.aspx?direct=true&db=lkh&AN=47524235&site=eds-live&scope=site
