= Ashtown Burials =

Novel series by N. D. Wilson

Ashtown Burials is a young adult fantasy series by N. D. Wilson. It consists of three published novels: The Dragon's Tooth (2011), The Drowned Vault (2012), and Empire of Bones (2013), as well as a fourth book, The Silent Bells, which was published in serial format in 24 installments between 2020 and 2025.

The series follow Cyrus Smith, who – along with his sister Antigone – is a member of the Order of Brendan, a secret organization that is under threat from transmortals, characters from history who have become immortal.

Marilyn E. Burton notes that in this series, "character of myth and legend from every culture and era populate our world." This makes us "reconsider the boundary lines between story and history, fact and fable." Jeremy Larson calls the series a "mythological and historical bricolage".

== Transmortals ==
Transmortals are a group of beings appearing in the series. A transmortal is simply an ordinary mortal who somehow becomes immortal. Thus they have transformed from mortal, to immortal. There is no common way to become a transmortal. Some have eaten of the Fruit of Life, or drank of the Fountain of Youth. Others become undying by possessing a powerful object, such as the Odyssian Cloak or Dragon's Tooth. It is also a result of some blessing or curse.

Wilson commonly chooses semi-famous people from history and mythology to give this transmortality to. In the first book of the Ashtown Burials, The Dragon's Tooth, Maximilien Robespierre, the leader of the French Revolution, is revealed to be a transmortal. In later books, legendary people like Gilgamesh of Uruk, Arachne, and Captain John Smith are introduced, all being known in the real world, and given transmortality by Wilson. These characters are given a mystical touch possibly derived from the uncertainty of the nature of the historical figures themselves.

A common trait among transmortals is grief, which often leads to violence. In truth, the transmortals are tired of living forever. The Order of Brendan will bury the most dangerous of the transmortals, while making power-limiting treaties with others. Many transmortals desire the burials, where they can endure life in sleep. There are few ways to kill transmortals, the Dragon's Tooth being the most famous. Many weapons were made with the charm of the tooth, and can cause pain when used on transmortals, but do not kill unless the Tooth itself is present. Several times, when Cyrus Smith has the Dragon's Tooth, his allied transmortals will plead for him to end their misery.

== Books ==
=== The Dragon's Tooth ===
The Dragon's Tooth
- Author: N. D. Wilson
- Language: English
- Series: Ashtown Burials
- Genre: Fantasy
- Publisher: Random House
- Publication date: August 23, 2011
- Publication place: United States
- Media type: Print (Hardcover)
- Pages: 485
- ISBN: 978-0-375-86439-1
- Followed by: The Drowned Vault

The Dragon's Tooth, published in 2011, is the first installment in the series and follows members of the Smith family, especially siblings Cyrus and Antigone who are new initiates in a secret society of explorers known as the Order of Brendan.

The author has stated that his intention was to write a young adult fantasy series whose sensibility and orientation were clearly American, in contrast to the Harry Potter and The Lord of the Rings fantasy series which are both anchored in an English milieu. And though the novel has some aspects of the occult and supernatural, he also strived to base the series in the physical realm, where the characters are forced to rely on their physical and mental acuity, hoping to motivate readers to be enchanted by "the wonder of here and the wonder of now."

The book is full of cultural, historical, and mythological references, such as the dragon's tooth of the title which is a reference to the Dragon's teeth of Greek mythology used by Jason in his quest for the Golden Fleece. Meanwhile, the antagonist of the novel, known as "Phoenix", references such classic villains as Dr. Moreau and Dr. Jekyll and Mr. Hyde.

==== Plot summary ====
In Wisconsin, near the shores of Lake Michigan, Cyrus and Antigone Smith run a beat up old motel called The Archer along with their older brother Dan. The motel hardly sees guests, with the exception of Mrs. Eldridge, a full-time occupant. One day a man named William Skelton comes to stay at the motel, giving Cyrus a set of keys along with something resembling a shark tooth saying they will "more than pay for the night." That night, the hotel is attacked by strange men, who eventually kill Skelton. Before he dies, he gives Cyrus a "patrik", a silver snake which disappears when it puts its tail in its mouth.

The next morning, Dan has gone missing. John Horace Lawney, Skelton's attorney, shows up and tells Cyrus and Antigone that Skelton had named them as his heirs. The three are chased by a man named Maxi, who appears to want the keys Cyrus has. While fleeing, Lawney gets shot, but the three make it a place called Ashtown. Ashtown is a large base for the Order of Brendan, a more-than-1000-year-old secret society made up of influential and extraordinary people, who explore and protect the world from evil. Bewildered, Cyrus and Antigone are sworn into the order by Rupert Greeves, a high ranking Ashtown official. It is declared that the two must meet the more rigorous 1914 standards for admission before receiving the contents of Skelton's estate. Mrs. Eldridge, who is an O of B member sent to watch the two by their late father and comatose mother, becomes their mentor.

The pair are sent to live in a run down part of Ashtown called the Polygon, where they meet Nolan. Nolan is a boy with "ancient eyes" who tells the two the history of the O of B, takes them around the estate, and introduces them to Ben Sterling, the kind but mysterious head chef. That night, they are visited by Rupert Greeves who tells them that Dan is in the hands of Dr. Phoenix, an evil mastermind who had been expelled from the O of B. He also informs Cyrus that the keys Skelton gave him are the "Solomon Keys" and will open any door. Greeves also reveals that he and the pair's father had been good friends, but their friendship was strained after their father brought their mother back from South America, resulting in his expulsion from the O of B. Cyrus uses the Keys to sneak into one of Ashtown's "Burials", specialized eternal holding cells for immortal or transmortal criminals.

The next day, Ben Sterling tells them the truth about the tooth. It is called the Dragon's Tooth and is an ancient and powerful relic which can supposedly raise the dead and kill the immortal. While searching the grounds, Cyrus and Antigone find "Quick Water", a strange gel which, when separated into two balls, allows the holder of one to see the holder of the other. Soon after, Ashtown is attacked by Maxi, intent on reclaiming the Dragon's Tooth for Phoenix, who is his master. Cyrus and Maxi fight and the patrik grows to an enormous size and attacks Maxi, protecting its owner. Cyrus uses the tooth to slay Maxi for good, but not before Maxi had killed Mrs. Eldridge and injured Nolan. It is revealed that Nolan is in fact a transmortal and sheds his skin anytime he is hurt. After the battle, Rupert tells Cyrus and Antigone that he had taken their father on a quest to find the tooth, but Phoenix had gotten there first and was the one who killed their father. Rupert was able to escape, but without their dad's body. Skelton then had betrayed Phoenix and taken the tooth from him, which is how it came to be in his possession before he gave it to Cyrus.

Soon after, Cyrus is taken hostage by Ben Sterling, who has been working with Phoenix the whole time. Sterling, as the head cook, poisoned the whole of Ashtown's dinner. In a moment of empathy, however, he leaves an antidote with Cyrus, who is still tied up. Antigone uses the Quick Water and, along with a 16-year-old accomplished member named Diana Boone, rescues Cyrus. With the help of friends, they are able to administer the antidote. Meanwhile, Dr. Phoenix enters Ashtown and tells of his plan to rid the world of humanity and use Ashtown as a nursery for a superior race, one he will be the master of. Cyrus and Antigone, along with the others, confront Phoenix and aggravate him to the point where he changes into Mr. Ashes, a white haired gorilla-like monster. A struggle ensues and Phoenix escapes with the Tooth, though not before the group badly injures his right arm. Cyrus and Antigone rescue their mother, who Phoenix had also been holding hostage, and Dan, whom Phoenix had brought to Ashtown as bargaining chips. Phoenix has operated on Dan and made him a larger, "upgraded" version of himself. In an epilogue, it is revealed that Phoenix has completely lost his right arm and also holds the body of Cyrus and Antigone's father.

Months later, Cyrus and Antigone pass the final tests to become complete members of the O of B. They are eligible to receive the contents of Skelton's estate. A healed Lawney shows the two what Skelton left. Along with money, he left them a map of Mongolia, an apple core, a booklet and an old paper sphere with a map of the world drawn on it, leaving Cyrus and Antigone utterly confused.

==== Reception ====
Critical reception to the novel was positive. Publishers Weekly, in a "starred review," referred to the book's "measured prose and smart dialogue." Kirkus Book Reviews noted that the book's "somewhat bombastic prose" was balanced by the heroes' "winsome charm."

=== The Drowned Vault ===
The Drowned Vault
- Author: N.D. Wilson
- Illustrator: None
- Language: English
- Series: Ashtown Burials
- Genre: Fantasy
- Publisher: Random House
- Publication date: September 11, 2012
- Publication place: United States
- Media type: Print (Hardcover)
- Pages: 464
- ISBN: 978-0-37586440-7
- Preceded by: The Dragon's Tooth
- Followed by: Empire of Bones

The Drowned Vault, published in 2012, is the second installment in the series. Kirkus Book Reviews suggested that "though the mythological references still succeed," it feels as though the author is "trying to keep the stakes high and to top what has come before, which can be tedious for readers who are not attached to the outcome."

=== Empire of Bones ===
Empire of Bones
- Author: N.D. Wilson
- Illustrator: None
- Language: English
- Series: Ashtown Burials
- Genre: Fantasy
- Publisher: Random House
- Publication date: October 22, 2013
- Publication place: United States
- Media type: Print (Hardcover)
- Pages: 448
- ISBN: 978-0375864414
- Preceded by: The Drowned Vault
- Followed by: The Silent Bells

Empire of Bones is a 2013 fantasy novel written by Wilson. It is the third installment in the series, the plot follows Cyrus and Antigone Smith through their greatest trial yet. With the help of decreasingly few allies, the Smiths must find a way to beat the young Dr. Oliver Phoenix, defeat Radu Bey along with the rest of the transmortals, and restore the Order of Brendan. To win, Cyrus must embrace his courage and leadership.

=== The Silent Bells ===
The Silent Bells is the fourth installment in the series. Whereas the first three novels were published by Random House, The Silent Bells is being published by Canon Press in serial format. The first installment was written in 2020. By 2024, 15 chapters had been written; the scheduled publication date is November 24, 2026, and it is being published by Cannonball Books .
