= Simon Sort of Says =

Children's book

- Author: Erin Bow
- Language: English
- Set in: Nebraska
- Publisher: Disney Hyperion
- Publication date: January 31, 2023
- Publication place: United States of America
- Pages: 336
- ISBN: 9781368082853

Simon Sort of Says is a 2023 children's novel written by Erin Bow. Simon O'Keeffe, a 12-year-old boy who was the lone survivor of a school shooting, and his family move across Nebraska from Omaha to Grin and Bear It; Grin and Bear It is in the National Quiet Zone, preventing anyone from looking up Simon's past. When Simon and his friends learn SETI is on the verge of losing funding, they decide to fake an alien radio transmission to help the scientists stay funded.

The book earned a Newbery Honor in 2023 and was longlisted for the National Book Award for Young People's Literature in 2023. In her review of the book, Newbery Medal-winning author Erin Entrada Kelly commended Bow's ability to handle the difficult subject matter.
