= Boys of Blur =

2014 young adult novel by N. D. Wilson

- Author: N.D. Wilson
- Language: English
- Genre: Fantasy
- Publisher: Random House
- Publication date: April 8, 2014
- Publication place: United States
- Media type: Print (Hardcover)
- Pages: 208
- ISBN: 978-0-44981673-8

Boys of Blur is a 2014 young adult novel by N. D. Wilson, published by Random House. It is set in the Florida Everglades, where boys play football and chase rabbits through burning sugarcane fields. According to Booklist, "Wilson brings the stuff of folklore to life in this novel, as elements of Beowulf, voodoo, and zombie mythos combine with the everyday to fantastic effect. The story moves at heart-pounding speeds, furthered by magic and mystery and rooted in ideas of familial bonds and self-discovery."

== Plot ==
Charlie Reynolds, a twelve-year-old, moves to Taper, Florida. Taper's high school football coach, Coach Wiz, has died, and Charlie's stepfather, Prester Mack, is going to replace him. Charlie then meets his step-second cousin, "Cotton" Mack, who tells him strange tales of the sugar cane fields. The plot thickens when Charlie meets a strange man named Lio, finds out about the mysterious disappearance of Coach Wiz's body, and sees blood markings on the town church. Scholastic.com adds, "Charlie hunts secrets in the glades and on the muck flats where the cane grows secrets as old as the soft earth — secrets that haunted, tripped, and trapped the original native tribes, ensnared conquistadors, and buried runaway slaves."

== Analysis ==
According to Kidsreads.com, "The main theme --- good versus evil --- is tightly interwoven throughout many other concurrent themes, including dysfunctional family relationships, child abuse, racism, and sugar cane harvest and muck rabbit history." Jeremy Larson argues that the connection between Boys of Blur and Beowulf hinges on the theme of "envious warfare".
