= Marie Rutkoski =

American writer

- Born: Marie Rutkoski; March 5, 1977 (age 49); Hinsdale, Illinois, U.S.
- Education: University of Iowa (BA); Harvard University (MA, PhD)
- Occupations: Author, professor at Brooklyn College
- Writing career
- Genres: Young Adult, Children's Books, Science Fiction & Fantasy
- Notable work: The Winner's trilogy
- Website: www.marierutkoski.com

Marie K. Rutkoski (born March 5, 1977) in Hinsdale, Illinois is an American children's writer, and professor at Brooklyn College. She has three younger siblings. She graduated from the University of Iowa with a B.A. in English with a minor in French in 1999, and then her English M.A. and Ph.D. from Harvard University in 2003 and 2006 respectively. She lives in Brooklyn with her family and two cats, Cloud and Firefly.

== Awards ==
- 1999 University of Iowa Honors Program Collegiate Scholar Award
- 2003 Dexter Traveling Fellowship
- 2005 Frank Knox Memorial Fellowship
- 2008 American Booksellers Association's Indie Next List for her debut novel, in its children aged 9 – 12 group

== Works ==
- "Arm the Minds of Infants: Interpreting Childhood in Titus Andronicus" Criticism, Volume 48, Number 2, Spring 2006, pp. 203–226
- "Breeching the Boy in Marlowe's Edward II" SEL: SEL: Studies in English Literature 1500–1900, Volume 46, Number 2, Spring 2006, pp. 281–304
- "Bridge of Snow" in Burniac, Lauren, ed. (2015). Fierce Reads: Kisses and Curses. Square Fish. ISBN 978-1-250-06053-2.
- "Jacks and Queens at the Green Mill" (October 16, 2021). Tor.com. ISBN 978-1-4668-3133-9

=== The Kronos Chronicles ===
- The Cabinet of Wonders (August 5, 2008). New York: Farrar, Straus and Giroux, pp. 272. ISBN 978-0-374-31026-4
- The Celestial Globe (April 13, 2010). New York: Farrar, Straus and Giroux, pp. 304. ISBN 978-0-374-31027-1
- The Jewel of the Kalderash (October 15, 2011). New York: Farrar, Straus and Giroux, pp. 336. ISBN 978-0-374-33678-3

=== Young Adult ===
- The Shadow Society. (October 16, 2012). New York: Farrar, Straus and Giroux. pp. 416. ISBN 978-0-374-34905-9
- The Winner's Trilogy
  - The Winner's Curse. (March 4, 2014). New York: Farrar, Straus and Giroux. pp. 368. ISBN 978-0-374-38467-8
  - The Winner's Crime. (March 3, 2015). New York: Farrar, Straus and Giroux. pp. 416. ISBN 978-0-374-38470-8
  - The Winner's Kiss. (March 29, 2016). New York: Farrar, Straus and Giroux. pp. 496. ISBN 978-0-374-38473-9
- Forgotten Gods
  - The Midnight Lie. (March 3, 2020). New York: Farrar, Straus and Giroux. pp. 368. ISBN 978-0-374-30638-0
  - The Hollow Heart. (September 14, 2021). New York: Farrar, Straus and Giroux. pp 304. ISBN 978-0-374-31384-5

=== Adult ===
- Real Easy. (January 18, 2022). New York: Henry Holt and Company. pp. 304. ISBN 978-1-250-78824-5 OCLC 1296179139
- Ordinary Love: a Novel. (July 10, 2025). Virago Press. pp. 368. ISBN 978-0-349-14687-4

== Reviews ==
- "The Cabinet of Wonders, Marie Rutkoski", David Hebblethwaite, SF Site
- "The Celestial Globe, by Marie Rutkoski", Charlotte's Library, 4/19/10
- "The Jewel of the Kalderash, by Marie Rutkoski", Kirkus Reviews, 9/1/11
- "Real Easy, by Marie Rutkoski", Kirkus Reviews, 11/30/21
