= Plain Kate =

Fantasy novel by Erin Bow

- The cover of Plain Kate
- Author: Erin Bow
- Cover artist: Juliana Kolesova; Lillie Howard (design)
- Language: English
- Genre: Fantasy, Wood Carving, Witchcraft
- Published: Arthur A. Levine Books
- Publication place: United States
- Pages: 311, 314 including Acknowledgments
- ISBN: 978-0-545-16664-5
- Preceded by: N/A

Plain Kate is a fantasy novel by author Erin Bow, published in 2010 by Arthur A. Levine Books, an imprint of Scholastic. The story, which draws from Russian folktales, focuses on an orphan girl nicknamed Plain Kate who is blamed for witchcraft because of her ability to carve wood, and who must deal with a real witch and sell her shadow in order to stay alive.

== Plot ==
Katerina "Kate" Svetlana is an orphan who lives in the small eastern European market town of Samilae. A stranger, Linay, offers Kate her heart's wish in exchange for her shadow. Linay provides her with basic necessities, and her wish to not be alone results in her pet cat Taggle gaining the power of speech.

Kate joins a group of Roamers; nomads who travel from town to town selling goods. She meets Drina, a girl with no mother but a living father, who tells Kate about an uncle who went mad once Drina's mother was burned as a witch. A few days later, Kate reveals to Drina that a witch took her shadow.

Throughout their journey, a mysterious fog creeps up the river, bringing a sleeping death to the people it touches. The people of the countryside are more fearful than ever, ready to pounce on any mysterious stranger or Roamer with accusations of witchcraft. Kate and Drina barely escape from an angry mob in Toila, and the Roamers start to believe that Kate is more trouble than she is worth.

Kate wakes up in a small boat and discovers that Linay has saved her from drowning in the water. Kate realizes that Linay is Drina's uncle and that the fog is actually a rusalka; the spirit of Drina's mother, Lenore. Linay promises to return Kate's shadow to her when they reach Lov, a big city downriver, but he needs her to exact his plan for revenge. He is leading his sister down the river and keeping her under control by offering her his blood, but he has no more blood to give. He asks Kate to offer some of her own blood. Kate reluctantly starts to feed her blood to Lenore every night. Soon, she discovers that her shadow is held in a box made of her stall's ruins.

After an attempt to free her shadow fails, Kate decides that she cannot allow Linay to destroy Lov, and she flees from Linay's boat, trying to beat him to the stone city. On the way, she meets Drina with Behjet; her father's twin. Behjet has fallen into the sleeping death. Drina says that the ghost has taken other Roamers as well. Together, the two arrive at Lov. There, they see Linay being captured by the city guards. He is calling for himself to be burned.

Combined with Kate's shadow, the rusalka begins to destroy Lov. Kate and Drina plead with Linay to stop her, but he refuses. Taggle, remembering the rule of magic, gives back the gift of his speech by selflessly jumping onto Kate's knife, killing himself, and ending the Rusalka's attack on the city. The Rusalka transforms back into Lenore, who comforts the dying Linay, and her daughter Drina. They leave Lov and find Behjet awake. Before Lenore fades again, crossing over completely into the afterlife, she grants Kate one last gift and uses her witchcraft to bring Taggle back to life, although without the ability to speak.

== Critical response ==
Plain Kate was well received by many critics. The New York Times Sunday Book Review praised the book, saying, "The plot unfolds with the swiftness and dramatic urgency of an adventure tale, yet each event has a measured gravity. Ambiguity and complexity shade the characterizations and the story line.". The Toronto Star called Plain Kate "a beauty of a book". The book was also nominated for, and won the English version of the 2011 TD Canadian Children's Literature Award as the year's best work in Canadian children's literature.
