= How to Succeed in Witchcraft =

LGBT young adult fantasy novel

- Author: Aislinn Brophy
- Audio read by: Tashi Thomas
- Publisher: G.P. Putnam's Sons
- Publication date: September 27, 2022
- Publication place: USA
- Pages: 416
- ISBN: 9780593354520
- OCLC: 1292970725

How to Succeed in Witchcraft is an LGBT fantasy young adult novel written by Aislinn Brophy and published by G.P. Putnam's Sons Books for Young Readers in August 2023. The book follows Shay Johnson, a junior at T.K. Anderson Magician Magnet School, in South Florida.

== Summary ==
Shay Johnson is a high achieving witch aspiring towards the Brockton Scholarship, which promises to give her a full ride scholarship to any school of her choosing. She is pressured by Mr. B, a drama teacher who has a lot of say in who will win the scholarship, to join the school musical. She must work with Ana Alvarez, her academic rival. As the preparation for the school musical continues, Shay warms up to Ana and the two become a couple. In the meantime, Shay becomes increasingly uncomfortable with Mr. B's inappropriate attention. She is scared to speak up against Mr. B because she may lose her scholarship and her parents cannot afford to send her to her dream university, Willington. However, when Shay sees Mr. B taking advantage of Brittany, a student, she realizes she cannot stay silent any longer.

== Characters ==
| Name | Description |
|---|---|
| Shayna (Shay) Johnson | Shay is an overachieving witch who is a junior at T.K. Anderson Magician Magnet School. She is passionate about potionwork and wants it to be her major in college. She is working towards earning the Brockton Scholarship. Shay is a half-Black lesbian with straight brown hair. |
| Mr. Johnson (Dad) | Mr. Johnson is Shay's father. He works for an eco-management company called Green Witch. Shay describes him as a herbology nerd. |
| Mrs. Johnson (Mom) | Mrs. Johnson is Shay's mother. She works at a magitech company called MarTech, however she does not have a magical license and is therefore overworked and underpaid. Shay initially believes that Mrs. Johnson expects Shay to be perfect at school while also being relaxed. |
| Lex | Lex is Shay's best friend. |
| Mr. Brockton (Mr. B) | Mr. B is the drama teacher at T.K. Anderson Magical Magnet School. His family runs a foundation that financially contributes to the Brockton Scholarship and he has an important role in deciding which candidate is chosen. Shay describes him as a youngish White man with beard scruff and blue eyes. |
| Ana Alvarez | Ana is Shay's academic rival turned ally. She is Cuban and has long, dark, curly hair, and thick eyebrows. Shay describes Ana's fashion style as androgynous business casual. |
| Brittany Cohen | Brittany is the winner of the previous year's Brockton Scholarship. She is heavily involved in the T.K. Anderson drama department and often stars in performances. Shay describes her as tall. |
| Pilar | Pilar is the owner of Pilar's, a potion shop where Shay and Lex work. Pilar is a middle-aged Afro-Cuban woman who often wears colorful clothing. |
| Ed Ferraro | Ed is described by Shay as a stoner theater kid. He plays a leading role in the school musical. He brews and sells illegal energy potions and ends up giving one to Shay. Ed is White and Latino. He speaks Spanish and his dad is Italian. |
| Mikey | Mikey is a senior in the school play. He has a crush on Shay. |
| Mateo | Mateo is another student in the school play. |
| Mrs. Morris | Mrs. Morris is a frequent customer at Pilar's. Shay is frustrated by her. She is White, old, and retired. |

== Setting ==
The novel takes place in a magical world that is similar to the real modern world. The majority of the novel centers around a fictional, highly selective private school called T.K. Anderson Magical Magnet School, located in Palm Beach County.

== Themes ==
- Abuse
- Academic Rivalry
- Classism
- Enemies-to-Lovers Romance
- Homophobia
- Racial Equity
- Racism

== Awards ==
How to Succeed in Witchcraft was nominated for Cybils Awards 2022 under the category YA Speculative Fiction.
