= The Winner's trilogy =

Young adult novel trilogy by Marie Rutkowski

The Winner's trilogy is a trilogy of young adult fantasy novels by Marie Rutkoski, which includes The Winner's Curse (2014), The Winner's Crime (2015), and The Winner's Kiss (2016), as well as the short story prequel, Bridge of Snow (2014).

== Reception ==
=== The Winner's Curse (2014) ===
The Winner's Curse received positive reviews from critics, including starred reviews from Kirkus Reviews and Publishers Weekly. Kirkus called the novel "breathtaking, tragic and true." Publishers Weekly wrote, "Like any epic page-turner worth its salt, Rutkoski’s richly imagined world is full of dynamic repartee, gruesome battle scenes, and shifting alliances."

The New York Times stated, “The Winner’s Curse is initially filled with society parties, elaborate hairstyles and low-cut gowns. Almost every chapter ends on a dramatic note." The Guardian reviewed the book, saying, "The Winner's Curse is a one of a kind, BRILLIANT book, perfect for fans of the entire Dystopian Genre! Everything about the book was so well planned out, the setting, the politics, the characters that it sucked me right in and refused to let go."

=== The Winner's Crime (2015) ===
The Winner's Crime received a starred review from Kirkus Reviews, who called the novel "enthralling, agonizing and incandescent."

== Awards and honors ==
Each of the main books in the series is a Junior Library Guild selection, including the audiobook version of The Winner's Curse.

The Winner's Curse was included in lists of the best books of the year by the Booklist, Kirkus Reviews, and the New York Public Library. The Winner's Crime was named one of the "Best Books of the Year 2015" in the Teen & Young Adult category by Amazon. The Winner's Kiss was named one of the best books of the year by the Los Angeles Public Library.

Awards for The Winner's Trilogy
Year	Title	Award	Result	Ref.
2014	The Winner's Curse	Goodreads Choice Award for Best Young Adult Fantasy & Science Fiction	Nominee	
2014	The Winner's Curse	Cybils Award for Young Adult Fantasy and Science Fiction	Finalist	
2015	The Winner's Crime	Goodreads Choice Award for Best Young Adult Fantasy & Science Fiction	Nominee	
2015	The Winner's Curse	ALA Best Fiction for Young Adults	Selection	
2016	The Winner's Kiss	Goodreads Choice Award for Best Young Adult Fantasy & Science Fiction	Nominee	

== Books ==
- Bridge of Snow (2014, Tor Books, ISBN 9781466861657)
- The Winner's Curse (2014, Farrar, Straus and Giroux, ISBN 9780374384685)
- The Winner's Crime (2015, Farrar, Straus and Giroux, ISBN 9780374384715 )
- The Winner's Kiss (2016, Farrar, Straus and Giroux, ISBN 9780374384739 )
