= Karen Schwabach =

American author

- Born: Chicago, Illinois
- Education: Antioch College, University at Albany, SUNY
- Occupation: Writer
- Writing career
- Pen name: Sage Blackwood

Karen Schwabach, who also uses the pen name Sage Blackwood, is an American author of children's books and young adult fiction, best known for her Jinx series.

== Biography ==
Blackwood was born in Chicago, grew up in New York, and spent many years living in Alaska. She received a Bachelor of Arts degree from Antioch College and a Master of Science in Teaching English as a second or foreign language from University at Albany, SUNY.

Before devoting her time to writing, Blackwood taught English as a second or foreign language in the Yup’ik village of Cheforna, after which she taught at Salem College in North Carolina.

== Awards and honors ==
Jinx was named one of the best books of 2013 by Kirkus Reviews, School Library Journal, the Chicago Public Library, and Amazon.

Miss Ellicott’s School for the Magically Minded is a Junior Library Guild book.

Awards for Blackwood's writing
Year	Title	Award	Result	Ref.
2002	A Pickpocket's Tale	Sidney Taylor Book Award	Winner	
2013	Jinx	Booklist Editors' Choice: Books for Youth	Selection	
2013	Jinx	Cybils Award for Elementary and Middle Grade Speculative Fiction	Finalist	
2016	Jinx	Mark Twain Readers Award		
2017	Miss Ellicott's School for the Magically Minded	Cybils Award for Elementary and Middle Grade Speculative Fiction	Finalist	
2018	Miss Ellicott's School for the Magically Minded	Amelia Bloomer Book List	Selection	

== Publications ==
=== As Karen Schwabach ===
- Thailand: Land of Smiles (1991, Dillon Press)
- El Salvador on the Road to Peace (1998, Dillon Press)
- A Pickpocket's Tale (2006, Random House)
- The Storm Before Atlanta (2010, Random House)
- The Hope Chest (2008, Random House)
- Starting From Seneca Falls (2020, Random House)

=== As Sage Blackwood ===
==== Standalone books ====
- Miss Ellicott's School for the Magically Minded (2017, Katherine Tegen Books, ISBN 978-0-0624-0263-9)

==== Jinx series ====
The Jinx books are published by HarperCollins.

1. Jinx (2013)
2. Jinx's Magic (2014)
3. Jinx's Fire (2015)
