= Anne Ursu =

American novelist

Anne Ursu is an American novelist and children's writer based in Minneapolis, Minnesota.

== Biography ==
She attended Brown University.

Ursu's first novel, Spilling Clarence, is about a drug that wafts through the air of a small Minnesota town. The drug had a strong effect on the town's residents, who then suffered from visceral memories and stupor. Her second novel, The Disapparation of James, is about a boy disappearing during a stage magic trick.

Breadcrumbs, a middle-grade novel published by Walden Pond Press, was released September 27, 2011. Inspired by Hans Christian Andersen's "The Snow Queen," Breadcrumbs is a story of the struggle to hold on, and of the things we leave behind.

Ursu has also written a trilogy for middle-grade readers, the Cronus Chronicles, (published by Atheneum), involving two cousins' adventures in the realms of Greek mythology. The individual titles are The Shadow Thieves, The Siren Song, and The Immortal Fire.

She published another middle-grade fantasy in 2013, The Real Boy, which was longlisted for the National Book Award.

She teaches at Hamline University's low residency MFA in Writing for Children and Young Adults.

Ursu is also the former author of a popular sports blog about the Minnesota Twins called bat-girl.com. In 2007, she posted on the site that she no longer had time to maintain it, saying: "The time has come to end this wonderful adventure. I had hoped to be able to keep it up with Dash, but I simply do not have time to do this blog well, and there is no point in doing it any other way."

== Awards and honors ==
- 2013, McKnight Fellowship in Children's Literature
- 2013, The Real Boy, longlisted for the National Book Award
- 2025, Not Quite a Ghost, nominated for a Minnesota Book Award in Middle Grade Literature

== Bibliography ==
- Spilling Clarence. Hyperion. 2003.—Winner of the 2003 New Voice (first-time author) award from the Minnesota Book Awards.
- The Disapparation of James. Hyperion. 2004. As recommended by Nancy Pearl in More Book Lust.
- Breadcrumbs. HarperCollins. 2011.
- The Real Boy. Walden Pond Press. 2013.
- The Lost Girl. Walden Pond Press. 2019.
- The Troubled Girls of Dragomir Academy. Walden Pond Press. 2021.
- Not Quite a Ghost. Walden Pond Press. 2024.

=== The Cronus Chronicles ===
1. The Shadow Thieves. Atheneum. 2006.
2. The Siren Song. Atheneum. 2007.
3. The Immortal Fire. Atheneum. 2009.

=== Articles and Short Stories ===
- "The President's New Clothes". Politically Inspired. MacAdam/Cage. 2003.
- Articles in the Washington Post Book World, the StarTribune, on Salon.com, and ESPN.com
