= Jenny Davidson =

American historian and writer

- Born: 1971 (age 54–55)

Academic background
- Education: Harvard University (A.B.); Yale University (Ph.D)

Academic work
- Institutions: Columbia University
- Main interests: Age of Enlightenment, Romanticism, intellectual history, history of science

Jenny Davidson (born 1971) is an American historian and writer who writes about 18th-century literature, etiquette and culture. She is currently a professor of English and Comparative Literature at Columbia University. She was a Guggenheim Fellow during 2005-2006 and was named a visiting scholar to The American Academy of Arts and Sciences that same year. Davidson was awarded the Mark Van Doren Award in 2010 for her commitment to undergraduate instruction.

== Biography ==
An alumna of Radcliffe College, Davidson completed her Ph.D. at Yale University in 1999. Her dissertation Hypocrisy and the Politics of Politeness was published by Cambridge University Press in 2004. Her analysis of 18th century literature and history, particularly the language that authors of the period used to describe social interactions posits that "politeness and manners served hypocritical aims, principally the subjugation of servants and women" Her second non-fiction publication Breeding: A Partial History of the Eighteenth Century continues this exploration of Age of Enlightenment authors along with people who have subsequently critiqued their work. Her research explores John Locke's and Jean-Jacques Rousseau's assertions about the nature of humanity, and looks at novelist Daniel Defoe and the implications of his decisions concerning portraying a man in isolation. Her research reveals "a fresh perspective on a world that was struggling between the belief that a person's birth determined his place in the world and one where virtually anyone could be transformed through education" using literature of the time as a lens through which to examine societal mores concerning inborn as well as cultivated talents. Reading Style: A Life In Sentences (2014) concentrates on the sentence as a unit of literary meaning.

Davidson has written several novels. Her first novel Heredity addresses similar themes of etiquette and culture that show up in her later research. The novel contains within it a fictional 18th-century manuscript which The New York Times Book Review said "comments cleverly on the novel's recasting of the classic coming-of-age motif as a struggle between warring impulses of self-perpetuation and self-annihilation." Heredity was chosen as a Gear 100 Buzz Pick of 2003 by Gear magazine.

== Bibliography ==
=== Non-fiction ===
- — (2007). Hypocrisy and the politics of politeness : manners and morals from Locke to Austen. Cambridge University Press.
- — (2008). Breeding : a partial history of the Eighteenth Century. New York: Columbia University Press.
- — (2014). Reading style : a life in sentences. Columbia University Press.
- — (2017). Reading Jane Austen. Cambridge, UK: Cambridge University Press.

=== Novels ===
- Davidson, Jenny (2003). Heredity. New York: Soft Skull Press. ISBN 9781887128797.
- — (2008). The explosionist. New York: HarperTeen. ISBN 9780061239755.
- — (2010). Invisible things. New York: HarperTeen. ISBN 9780061239786.
- — (2010). The magic circle. New York: New Harvest.

=== Critical studies and reviews of Davidson's work ===
- Spinrad, Norman (Oct–Nov 2013). "Genre versus literature". On Books. Asimov's Science Fiction. 37 (10–11): 182–191. Review of The magic circle.
