= N. D. Wilson =

American author of young adult fiction (born 1978)

- Born: Nathan David Wilson; 1978 (age 47–48); Moscow, Idaho, U.S.
- Occupation: Author
- Spouse: Heather Wilson
- Children: 5
- Parent: Douglas Wilson
- Writing career
- Genres: Young adult fiction, children's literature, apologetics
- Notable works: 100 Cupboards Trilogy; Ashtown Burials series Leepike Ridge; Notes from the Tilt-a-Whirl

Nathan David Wilson (born 1978) is an American author of young adult fiction, children's literature, and Christian apologetics. He is best known for his fantasy series, including the 100 Cupboards trilogy, the Ashtown Burials series, and the Outlaws of Time series. His work is often characterized by allusions to classic literature and themes of fatherhood.

Beyond his writing, Wilson is a filmmaker and has served as a Fellow of Literature at New Saint Andrews College. He has written and directed several films, including the feature-length drama The River Thief (2016) and the documentary The Riot and the Dance (2020). He also serves as an executive producer for the animated series Hello Ninja, which is based on his picture book of the same name.

Wilson is the son of theologian Douglas Wilson and is active in the Christian community in Moscow, Idaho. In recent years, he has been involved in local controversies regarding public protests and city mandates, and in 2017, he underwent surgery for a brain tumor.

== Background ==
Wilson is the son of Reformed minister Douglas Wilson and author Nancy Wilson. He was named after the biblical figures Nathan and David, and was educated at Logos School.

In sixth grade, Wilson decided that he wanted to become a writer, but he did not do any lengthy fiction writing until some years later. Wilson graduated from New Saint Andrews College in 1999. He studied theology through Liberty University from 1999 to 2000, and he received a master's degree in liberal arts from St. John's College in 2001.

During his graduate studies, Wilson began to work seriously toward writing children's fantasy. Of his first (unpublished) novel, The Seventh Sneeze, he would later joke, "The title was the best thing about it." Wilson abandoned that project and launched a second attempt, which would ultimately become his 100 Cupboards series.

Wilson began teaching at New Saint Andrews College as an adjunct professor in 2001. In 2005, he was named a Fellow of Literature at the college. The same year, Wilson announced in Books & Culture magazine that he had made a near-duplicate of the Shroud of Turin image by exposing dark linen to the sun for ten days under a sheet of glass on which a positive mask had been painted, and in doing so, "caused some uproar in the Shroud of Turin world."

Wilson was the managing editor for Credenda/Agenda magazine. He is a Teacher at Christ Church in Moscow, Idaho.

Wilson is married. He and his wife Heather have five children.

In 2017, Wilson underwent surgery to remove a brain tumor.

In October 2020, Wilson's church, Christ Church, organized protests against a COVID-19 related mask mandate. Wilson was charged with various misdemeanors following an episode where he allegedly plastered public property with stickers that compared the town of Moscow to the Soviet Union. He called the town's actions an abuse of power. The case was still pending as of May 2022.

== Writing career ==
Wilson has published three book series, two standalone novels for young adults, picture books, and a textbook.

Wilson has written that his fiction is characterized by its creative allusions to classic literature. Leepike Ridge uses themes from The Odyssey, The Adventures of Tom Sawyer, and King Solomon's Mines, while the 100 Cupboards series was influenced by the King Arthur stories, both as told by Geoffrey of Monmouth and by Edmund Spenser in The Faerie Queene, and fairy tales from Robert Kirk and Sir Walter Scott. The Ashtown Burials series includes many historical and mythological characters (including Gilgamesh), and the first book in that series, The Dragon's Tooth, refigures elements from the opening chapters of Treasure Island. Boys of Blur, meanwhile, mirrors Beowulf—despite being set in the Florida Everglades.

One of the themes that runs through Wilson's books is fatherhood, and how to deal with fatherlessness by finding fathers.

Wilson's short fiction and prose have been published in Credenda/Agenda, the Chattahoochee Review, the Esquire napkin project, Christianity Today, and Books & Culture.

Wilson's writings have received mostly positive reviews. Kirkus Reviews said of The 100 Cupboards, "Wilson's writing is fantastical, but works with clever sentences and turns of phrase that render it more than just another rote fantasy."

== Film ==
A "bookumentary" film adaptation of Notes from the Tilt-a-Whirl, narrated by Wilson, was released on DVD in 2011.

N.D. Wilson also wrote and filmed a movie called The River Thief. The movie was released to theaters in 2016, starring Joel Courtney.

Year	Film	Director	Writer	Producer	Notes
2009	Collision: Christopher Hitchens vs Douglas Wilson	No	No	Executive	Documentary film
2010	Hootie	Yes	Yes	No	Short film
2011	Notes from the Tilt-a-whirl	No	No	Executive	Documentary film
2014	Mercy Rule	No	Yes	No	Directed to DVD length film
2014	The Hound of Heaven	Yes	Yes	No	Short film
2016	The River Thief	Yes	Yes	Yes	Feature-length film
2020	The Riot and the Dance	Yes	Yes	No	Documentary film

== Television ==
Year	Film	Director	Writer	Producer	Notes
2019	Hello Ninja	No	No	Executive	Based on his children's book
2019	House of David	No	Yes	No	

== Bibliography ==
=== 100 Cupboards series ===
- Wilson, ND (2007), 100 Cupboards, Random House, ISBN 978-0-375-83881-1.
- ——— (2009), Dandelion Fire, 100 Cupboards, Random House, ISBN 978-0-375-83883-5.
- ——— (2010), The Chestnut King, 100 Cupboards, Random House, ISBN 978-0-375-83886-6.
- ——— (2017), The Door Before, 100 Cupboards, Random House, ISBN 978-044-9-81677-6.

=== Ashtown Burials series ===
- Wilson, ND (2011), The Dragon's Tooth, Ashtown Burials, Random House, ISBN 978-0-375-86439-1.
- ——— (2012), The Drowned Vault, Ashtown Burials, Random House, ISBN 978-0-375-86440-7.
- ——— (2013), Empire of Bones, Ashtown Burials, Random House, ISBN 978-0-375-86441-4.

=== Outlaws of Time series ===
- Wilson, ND (2016), Outlaws of Time: The Legend of Sam Miracle, Katherine Tegen Books, ISBN 978-0-062-32726-0.
- ——— (2017), The Song of Glory and Ghost, Outlaws of Time, Katherine Tegen Books, ISBN 978-0-062-32729-1.
- ——— (2018), The Last of the Lost Boys, Outlaws of Time, Katherine Tegen Books, ISBN 978-0-062-32732-1.

=== Other children's fiction ===
- Wilson, ND (2007), Leepike Ridge, Random House, ISBN 978-0-375-83873-6.
- ——— (2014), Boys of Blur, Random House, ISBN 978-0-449-81673-8.

=== Christian living ===
- Wilson, ND (2009), Notes from the Tilt-A-Whirl, Thomas Nelson, ISBN 978-0-8499-2007-3.
- ——— (2013), Death by Living, Thomas Nelson, ISBN 978-0-8499-2009-7.

=== Parody ===
- Wilson, ND (2001), Right Behind: a parody of last days goofiness, The Upturned Table, Canon Press, ISBN 978-1-885767-87-5.
- ——— (2003), Supergeddon: a really big Geddon, The Upturned Table, Canon Press, ISBN 978-1-59128-013-2.

=== Picture books ===
- Wilson, ND (2007), The Dragon and the Garden, Canon Press, ISBN 978-1-59128-044-6.
- ——— (2007), In the Time of Noah, Canon Press, ISBN 978-1-59128-045-3.
- ——— (2013), Hello Ninja, Canonball Books, ISBN 978-1-59128-157-3.
- ——— (2014), Ninja Boy Goes to School, Canonball Books, ISBN 9780375865848.
- ——— (2014), Blah Blah Black Sheep, Canonball Books, ISBN 9781591281580.

=== Textbooks ===
- Wilson, ND; Wilson, Douglas (2011), The Rhetoric Companion, Canon Press, ISBN 978-1-59128-093-4.
