= Angelfall =

Post-apocalyptic fantasy novel by Susan Ee

- First cover of the paperback edition
- Author: Susan Ee
- Language: English
- Series: Penryn & the End of Days
- Genre: Young adult fiction, paranormal romance
- Published: May 21st, 2011
- Publisher: Feral Dream
- Publication place: United States
- Media type: E-book, print (hardcover and paperback), audiobook
- Pages: 283
- ISBN: 978-0761463276
- Followed by: World After; End of Days

Angelfall is a post-apocalyptic fantasy novel written by Korean-American author Susan Ee. It is the first book in the Penryn & the End Of Days trilogy. The story is narrated by Penryn Young, a 17-year-old girl living in the San Francisco Bay, which has been attacked by angels. The book has been translated to more than 20 languages and was one of the finalists for the Best Fantasy and Fiction Book in the 2011 Cybils Award. It was also one of the top 5 E-book UK Bestsellers in Amazon. In November 2012, the movie rights was picked up by Good Universe. A sequel, World After, was released the following year. The final book End of Days was released in May 2015.

== Synopsis ==
Six weeks have passed since the angels of the apocalypse arrived and destroyed the modern world. With street gangs controlling the streets and fear and superstition taking over after dark, society has fallen into chaos. When a group of warrior angels kidnaps her helpless younger sister, seventeen-year-old Penryn is determined to do whatever it takes to get her back.[1]

== Background and inspirations ==
Susan Ee has stated that she has been fascinated with angels for a long time. Most classic angels were portrayed as destroyers and creatures of doom, but today, they are portrayed as guardian angels. Ee decided to follow the original portrayal of angels. The main character was named after the exit off Highway 80 in California, where she regularly used to drive by. The book was first self-published by Ee for personal reasons. She wrote the first draft of Angelfall, hoping that she could acquire a small group of readers interested in the story. It was later published by Amazon Children's Publishing on August 28, 2012.

== Reception ==
The book received positive reviews from a number of critics. Publishers Weekly described it as a fresh romance with well-developed characters, atmosphere, and strong writing. The Guardian UK gave a positive review. The book has been translated to more than 20 languages and was one of the finalists for the Best Fantasy and Fiction Book in the 2011 Cybils Award. It was also one of the top 5 E-book UK Bestsellers in Amazon. UK GRAZIE magazine described it as the "next big thing" in the wake of Twilight and Hunger Games. It was one of the top rated books of Entertainment Weekly. Angelfall was selected as one of the 100 Best Fantasy Books of all Time by Time magazine.

== Film adaptation ==
On September 13, 2011, Angelfall acquired a major film agent to represent its film rights. In November 2012, the movie rights were picked up by Good Universe and Ghost House Pictures.
