= Jinx (Blackwood novel) =

2013 children's novel by Sage Blackwood

- First edition cover of Jinx
- Author: Sage Blackwood
- Language: English
- Publisher: HarperCollins
- Publication date: January 8, 2013
- Publication place: United States
- ISBN: 9780062129901
- Followed by: Jinx's Magic

Jinx is the first novel (2013) in a middle-grades children's fantasy trilogy by Sage Blackwood, published by HarperCollins. Set in a sentient primeval forest called The Urwald, the novel follows the adventures of a boy named Jinx who is abandoned in the forest and rescued by the wizard Simon Magus. Jinx grows up in Simon's house. After the wizard does a spell on Jinx that causes him to lose his ability to see others' emotions, Jinx runs away to seek help from the evil Bonemaster.

The second and third books in the trilogy are Jinx's Magic (2014) and Jinx's Fire (2015).

A separate Blackwood fantasy for middle-grade readers, Miss Ellicott's School for the Magically Minded, was published by HarperCollins in 2017.

== Reception ==
According to The New York Times, Jinx is magical and brilliant, a world wonderfully imagined, with "scenes that delight, enchant and thrill.". The book was selected as a Best Book of 2013 by Kirkus Reviews, School Library Journal, Booklist, the Chicago Public Library, and Amazon.

The Guardian reviewer ChristopherW wrote of Jinx's Magic, "I hate starting a series part way through, but the author did a good job of filling me in with the story so far. I'm going to read the first book in the series very soon. I'd recommend this to fans of anything magical!"

Of Jinx's Fire, Kirkus Reviews said, "A solid conclusion to a trilogy ... threaded with proper amounts of heroism, humor and ingenious twists of character."

Jinx was among the purchases made by President Obama for his daughters, at a D.C. area independent bookstore on the 2013 Thanksgiving weekend Small Business Saturday.
