= Erin Bow =

American author

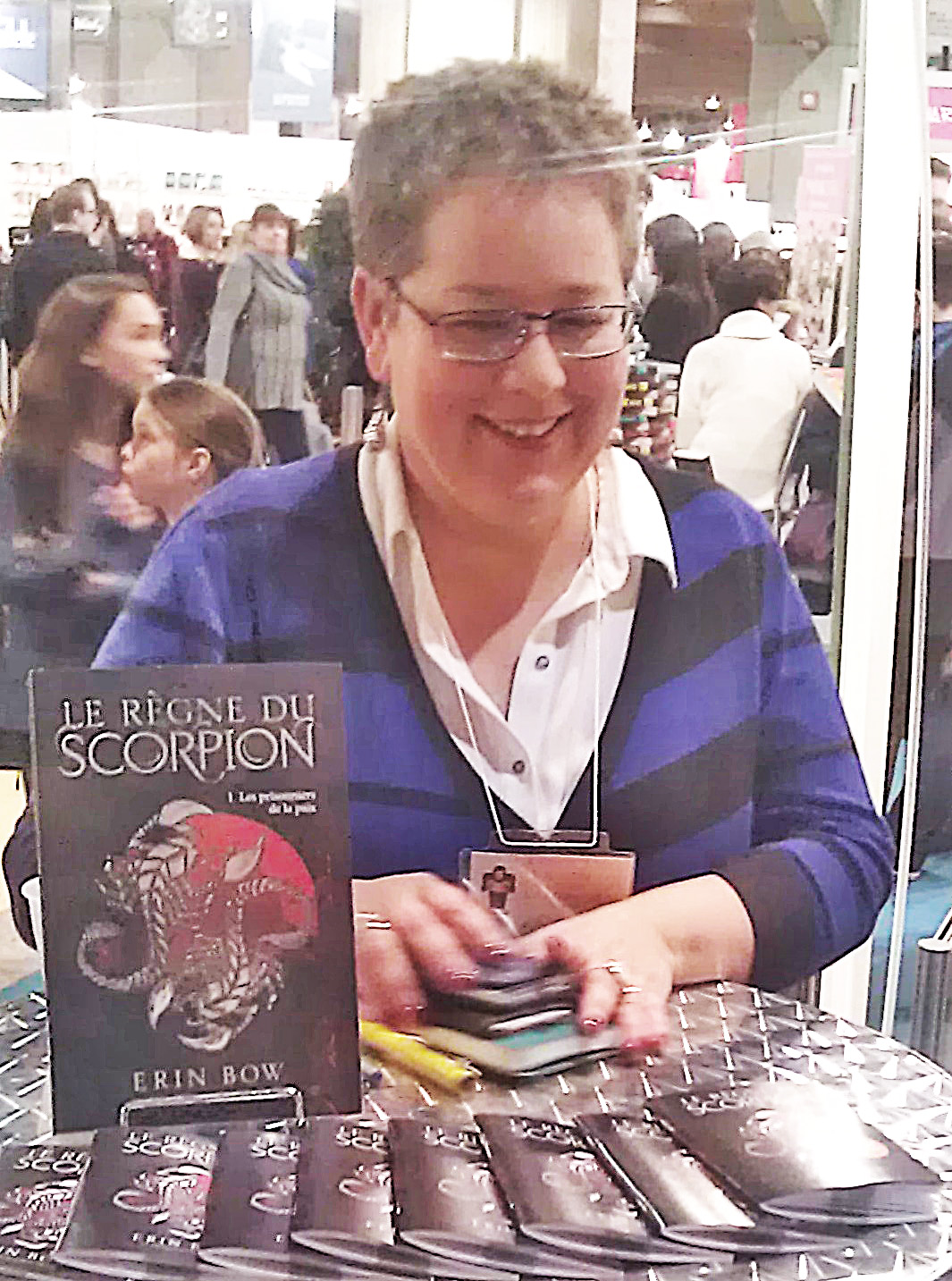
- Erin Bow photographed in Montreal, Quebec, Canada at the Salon du livre de Montréal 2016.
- Born: Erin Noteboom; April 1, 1972 (age 54); Des Moines, Iowa, USA
- Citizenship: Dual: American and Canadian
- Education: Creighton University
- Occupation: Author
- Spouse: James Bow
- Children: 2 children
- Writing career
- Language: English
- Period: 2001–present
- Genres: Young adult, Speculative fiction, Science fiction, Fantasy, Dystopian, Historical fiction, Bildungsroman
- Notable work: Plain Kate
- Notable awards: TD Canadian Children's Literature Award (2011); Monica Hughes Award (2014); Canadian Library Association Book of the Year for Children Award (2016)
- Website: erinbow.com

Erin Bow (née Noteboom; born April 1, 1972) is an American-born Canadian author. Among other awards and honors, she won the 2011 TD Canadian Children's Literature Award for Plain Kate, the 2014 Monica Hughes Award for Sorrow's Knot, the 2016 Canadian Library Association Book of the Year for Children Award for The Scorpion Rules, and a 2019 Governor General's Award for Stand on the Sky.

== Early life and education ==
Erin Noteboom was born in Des Moines, Iowa, and raised in Omaha, Nebraska. She had one sibling, a younger sister named Wendy. As a child, she was interested in science, writing, and exploring the woods. In her eighth grade year, Noteboom moved from a suburb in Des Moines to a suburb in Omaha. She then attended Mercy High School and graduated in 1990. In high school, she founded the math club and was the captain of the debate team.

She graduated from Creighton University, where she studied physics as a major and writing as a minor. Noteboom chose physics because she believed that it was "easier to become a self-taught writer rather than a self-taught physicist."

After her undergraduate, Noteboom attended a doctoral program in particle physics in Twin Cities, Minnesota. As part of her research, she worked a summer student at the European Organization for Nuclear Research (CERN) near Geneva, Switzerland. During graduate school, Noteboom was diagnosed with a brain tumor. Though doctors initially thought the tumor was fatal, it was ultimately found to be a removable glioma. This diagnosis contributed to a change of priorities for Noteboom, leading her to drop out of graduate school and return full-time to poetry.

== Career ==
Bow wrote poetry and a memoir before focusing on writing young adult works. During this time, she worked various jobs but all related to her passion as a writer. She was the poetry editor for the New Quarterly and organised writing workshops in Kitchener, Ontario. She also worked as a part-time writer at the Perimeter Institute for Theoretical Physics, and participated in the Vancouver Writers Fest Writer-in-Residence program at Rossland Summit School.

As part of St. Jerome University's Reading Series, Bow gave a talk on the intersection between science and literature.

=== Writing influences and themes ===
Bow's novels typically depict young adults in a science fiction and fantasy setting. She has written a defense of young adult fantasy, arguing that fantasy books help young adults to fall in love with reading. Bow also likes to write about unsolvable questions.

She takes inspiration from places, such as the prairies she grew up on, Saskatchewan, and the Black Hills in South Dakota. Bow also draws influence from Lakota and Russian folklore. Bow's characters rarely have a default race or sexual orientation. Her themes generally cover the concepts of acting on faith, doing what is right, and being human.

== Awards and honors ==
Four of Bow's books are Junior Library Guild selections: Plain Kate (2010), The Scorpion Rules (2015), Stand on the Sky (2019), and Simon Sort of Says (2023).

Bow's works have landed on multiple "best-of" lists. In 2010, Kirkus Reviews named Plain Kate one of the best books of the year. Young Adult Library Services Association included it on their 2011 list of Best Fiction for Young Adults. In 2013, Kirkus Reviews and Quill & Quire named Sorrow's Know one of the best books of the year. In 2015, Chapters and Kirkus Reviews named The Scorpion Rules one of the best books of the year. In 2023, Kirkus Reviews named Simon Sort of Says one of the best middle grade books of the year.

Awards for Bow's writing
| Year | Title | Award | Result | Ref. |
|---|---|---|---|---|
| 2001 | Ghost Maps: Poems for Carl Hruska | CBC Canadian Literary Award | Won | |
| 2003 | Ghost Maps: Poems for Carl Hruska | Kitchener Waterloo Arts Award – Literary Award | Won | |
| 2004 | Ghost Maps: Poems for Carl Hruska | Acorn-Plantos Award for Peoples Poetry, Ontario Poetry Society | Won | |
| 2004 | Ghost Maps: Poems for Carl Hruska | Pat Lowther Memorial Award | Shortlisted | |
| 2010 | Plain Kate | Cybils Award for Young Adult Fantasy & Science Fiction | Finalist | |
| 2011 | Plain Kate | Canadian Library Association Book of the Year for Children Award | Shortlisted | |
| 2011 | Plain Kate | CBC Reader's Choice Award | Nominated | |
| 2011 | Plain Kate | Sunburst Award for Young Adult Work | Shortlisted | |
| 2011 | Plain Kate | TD Canadian Children's Literature Award for English Language | Won | |
| 2014 | Sorrow's Knot | CBC Reader's Choice Award | Nominated | |
| 2014 | Sorrow's Knot | Monica Hughes Award for Science Fiction and Fantasy | Won | |
| 2014 | Sorrow's Knot | Ruth and Sylvia Schwartz Award | Shortlisted | |
| 2014 | Sorrow's Knot | Sunburst Award for Young Adult Work | Shortlisted | |
| 2016 | The Scorpion Rules | Canadian Library Association Book of the Year for Young Adults Award | Won | |
| 2017 | The Scorpion Rules | Manitoba Young Readers' Choice Award | Shortlisted | |
| 2019 | Stand on the Sky | Governor General's Award for English-language children's literature | Won | |
| 2023 | Simon Sort of Says | National Book Award for Young People's Literature | Longlisted | |
| 2023 | Simon Sort of Says | Newbery Medal | Honor | |
| 2023 | Simon Sort of Says | Schneider Family Book Award for Middle-Grade | Honor | |

== Personal life ==
In 1997, Noteboom moved to Canada. There, she married fellow author and Canadian James Bow.

In 2005, her younger sister, a painter named Wendy Ewell, drowned.

Bow lives with her husband, two children, and two pets in Kitchener, Ontario, Canada. She writes in a modified backyard shed and enjoys cooking.

== Works ==
=== Fiction ===
==== Standalone novels ====
- Plain Kate. New York: Arthur A. Levine Books. 2010. ISBN 978-0-545-16664-5. (Note: Plain Kate was published as Wood Angel in the United Kingdom.)
- Sorrow's Knot. Arthur A. Levine Books. 2013. ISBN 978-0-545-16666-9.
- Stand on the Sky. Boston; New York: Houghton Mifflin Harcourt. 2019. ISBN 978-1-328-63007-0.
- Simon Sort of Says. Los Angeles; New York: Disney-Hyperion. 2023. ISBN 978-1-368-08285-3.

==== Prisoners of Peace series ====
Prisoners of Peace is a book series set in a future dystopia on the prairies of Saskatchewan. Children of rulers are hostages to be killed if their country goes to war. The hostages are kept together in a school and must obey the governing AIs who manage it.

- The Scorpion Rules. New York: Margaret K. McElderry Books. 2015. ISBN 978-1-4814-4271-8. OCLC 915751997.
- The Swan Riders. New York: Margaret K. McElderry Books. 2016. ISBN 978-1-4814-4274-9. OCLC 939706936.

==== Butter and Owl Adventures series ====
Erin Bow is the author of the fantasy series Butter and Owl Adventures, illustrated by Kelly Murphy. Its first volume, Witchward Bound, inspired by the Odyssey, has received a starred review from Kirkus and has been distinguished as a Best Kids' Books of 2026 by Indigo.

=== Short fiction ===
Collaborating with her husband James Bow, Erin Bow published a short piece of fiction titled "A Stone of the Heart" in 2001. "A Stone of the Heart" was published in Missing Pieces (2001), a collection of Doctor Who stories.

=== Poetry ===
Under her maiden name Erin Noteboom, Bow published two volumes of poetry:

- Ghost Maps: Poems for Carl Hruska. Wolsak and Wynn Publishers Ltd. 2003. ISBN 978-0-919-89790-8.
- Seal Up the Thunder. Wolsak and Wynn Publishers Ltd. 2005. ISBN 978-1-894-98700-4.
- A knife so sharp its edge cannot be seen. Brick Books. 2023. ISBN 978-1-771-31603-3.

Her poetry was also published in other collections, including The Malahat Review, PRISM International, Prairie Fire, and online in Rattle.

=== Memoir ===
- The Mongoose Diaries. Wolsak and Wynn Publishers Ltd. 2007. ISBN 978-1-894-98715-8.

=== Other ===
In 2013, Bow wrote A Defense of Fantasy: Classical Literature v. Modern YA (2013) for YA Interrobang. She also published short essays for the Perimeter Institute of Theoretical Physics.
