= Sarah Prineas =

American fantasy author

Sarah Prineas is an American fantasy author who lives in Iowa and once worked for the honors program at the University of Iowa. She is married to John Prineas, a Professor in the Department of Physics and Astronomy and the Optical Science and Technology Center at the University of Iowa. They have two children. Prineas is originally from Lyme, Connecticut. She went to college in Minnesota. She has lived in Germany.

Her first novel The Magic Thief was published in 2008 by HarperCollins in the United States. As of June 2008, foreign rights had been sold to thirteen other countries. The sequel, The Magic Thief: Lost came out in 2009 and a third book, The Magic Thief: Found came out in 2010. Before she turned to novels, Prineas wrote fantasy short stories for adult markets. She also created Thorn and Rose.

In 2008, she donated her archive to the department of Rare Books and Special Collections at Northern Illinois University.

== Publications ==
=== Novels ===
- The Magic Thief (2008). HarperCollins.
- The Magic Thief: Lost (2009). HarperCollins.
- The Magic Thief: Found (2010). HarperCollins.
- Winterling (2011). HarperCollins.
- Summerkin (2012). Harper Collins
- Moonkind (2013). Harper Collins
- The Magic Thief: Home (2014). HarperCollins.
- Ash and Bramble (2015)
- Rose and Thorn (Ash and Bramble #2). (2016)
- Heart of the Land (Spirit Animals: Fall of the Beasts #5). (2017)
- The Lost Books: The Scroll of Kings (2018). HarperCollins
- Dragonfell (2019)
- Trouble in the Stars (2021)

=== Short stories ===
- From the Journals of Professor Copernicus Finch, M.S. Hex.D (2000). Ideomancer.
- Water, Green River, Daybreak (2001)
- The Illuminated Dragon (2002)
- A Treatise on Fewmets
- Crow's Changeling (2005)
- Hekaba's Demon
- Winged Victory (2005)
- Dragon Hunt (2007)
- The Red Cross Knight (2011)
- Thrice Sworn (Winterling #0.5)(2013)
- OWL: A Winterling Story about Fer and Rook (2015)
- Jane. A Story of Manners, Magic and Romance
