= The Magic Thief =

Novel by Sarah Prineas

- Cover art for The Magic Thief by Sarah Prineas
- Author: Sarah Prineas
- Cover artist: Antonio Javier Caparo (illustrator)
- Language: English
- Series: The Magic Thief
- Genre: Fantasy novel
- Publisher: HarperCollins (USA) and Quercus (UK)
- Publication date: 2008
- Publication place: United States
- Media type: Print (hardback & paperback)
- Pages: 419
- ISBN: 978-0-06-137587-3 (USA hardcover edition)
- OCLC: 166872403
- LC Class: PZ7.P93646 St 2008
- Preceded by: NA
- Followed by: The Magic Thief: Lost

The Magic Thief is the first book in a children's fantasy trilogy published by HarperCollins in June 2008. Authored by American Sarah Prineas and illustrated by Antonio Javier Caparo, the novel follows the adventures of Connwaer, a thief, who is taken into apprenticeship by Nevery Flinglas, an old wizard.

The sequels The Magic Thief: Lost was published in June 2009, followed by The Magic Thief: Found in May 2010 and The Magic Thief: Home in September 2014. There is also a short e-story, A Proper Wizard, released before the fourth sequel.

== Beginnings ==
Prineas wrote the first chapter of The Magic Thief for Cricket, a literary magazine for young adults, after a request for stories about wizards and serialized fiction. When she felt the characters had more to tell, she expanded it into a novel, and then into a trilogy. She later published a stand-alone fourth book, and an e-story.

== Overview ==
Connwaer, a pickpocket on the streets of the Twilight, one day picks the pocket of a powerful wizard named Nevery and steals his locus magicalicus, a special stone that helps wizards connect to the magical power of the city. It should kill Conn, but Nevery stops the process by saying a spell using Conn's name. It turns out that Nevery has just returned (or rather, snuck in) after a 20-year exile, to try to save the town from the leaching of its magic, upon which so much, including its economy, depends. Curious about the boy, Nevery takes him on as a servant and then later an apprentice. Although it is the wizard's job to stem the tide of the disappearing magic, he seems unable to do so. Conn believes he knows the answer, but his enemies are closing in.

== Characters ==
- Connwaer/Conn - A former thief who lived alone on the streets of Twilight. Nevery takes him on as a servant/assistant, but soon made Conn his apprentice. Conn has a mysterious past which he is reluctant to reveal to anyone.

Conn could be any age from twelve to fourteen, and has unkempt black hair that usually obscures his large, bright blue eyes. He is quick-witted, curious, innovative and bold, completely unbound by the deep-rooted beliefs in magic. Several characters noted him for being quiet.
Conn likes reading and thinking about magic, and is a voracious eater. He could touch others' locus stones without dying and has never been ill. Growing up as a thief, Conn learns to be slippery, but he is completely honest (so instead of lying, which he could not do, he sometimes chooses not to reveal), and is sometimes stubborn and impetuous, heading into trouble without much planning beforehand. He wholeheartedly believes the magic must be protected, and that he is chosen to do so by it, and selflessly puts its safety before his own wellbeing. All this coupled with his strange ideas, he has a knack for attracting trouble.

- Nevery Flinglas - A wizard who had been exiled from Wellmet for 20 years after experimenting with pyrotechnics. He returns to solve a magical problem in Wellmet after Brumbee sent him a plea. Though at first Nevery try not to notice or become attached to Conn, he was impressed by Conn's eagerness and strong affinity to magic, and soon becomes more caring towards his apprentice. Though outwardly irascible and rash, Nevery is deeply kind and flexible; like other wizards, he once stubbornly believes in old truths, but by Conn's influence he starts to be able to accept new ideas.

Nevery lives in Heartsease, a mansion on one of the wizard islands in the Wellmet River. The house has been in his family for generations, and have once been grand, but was partially destroyed in Nevery's pyrotechnic experiment and abandoned for decades. Conn discovered his family chronicles and locus stone collection there, which contain records about Nevery's parents, his relatives, and a young girl who might have been his sister or daughter, all of whom long gone, but the cause of his whole family's demise remains unknown.

- Benet - Nevery's bodyguard. He is on bad terms with Conn at first, but after seeing Conn's devotion to learning magic and talent, feels more respect and affection towards him, giving him haircuts, delicious meals and hand-knitted clothes, and risking himself to save Conn several times. Apart from being an intimidating fighter, he is also a great chef and likes to knit things in his free time.

Though he seems formidable and hard on the outside, Benet has a tendency to understand, as well as notice something wrong with Conn that Nevery frequently overlook, and stood up to his master for his sometimes insensible nature.

- Pettivox - The evil master of Keeston, and though they are both magisters, he openly show his mistrust and disdain of Nevery Flinglas. Keeston speaks about him with fear, and Conn guessed that he beats Keeston. Pettivox has white skin and red lips, and speaks with a high voice despite his tall, burly build. It is revealed that Pettivox is working with the Underlord to drain all the magic from Wellmet and sell it. He is later appointed as liaison for the Duchess and the Underlord, and makes use of his position to spy on her and gives her misleading information. He is assumed to have died in the explosion at Dusk House by the end of the book.
- Keeston - Pettivox's apprentice whom Pettivox offered as assistant to Nevery, in order for Keeston to spy on him. Tall and blond with blue eyes, Keeston is as proud of his looks as his magical abilities. Being top of the class, he is usually paired with the beginner Conn, much to his angst. He and Conn dislike each other from the start, but become good friends after Pettivox died and Keeston had changed for the better. Keeston later became Brumbee's apprentice, and according to him was heavily influenced by Conn's ideas about magic later on in the series.
- Rowan Forestal - At first unknown to Conn, the tomboyish daughter of the Duchess. She has short red hair that looks like it has been hacked off, and catlike grey eyes. She enjoys sword fight and adventure, and is known to be very impatient; Brumbee sets her to teach Conn how to read runes when he first become apprentice, and Rowan herself speculates that it might have been to practice her patience. Though Conn dislikes Rowan at first sight, the pair quickly became friends when he saw her true fun-loving self beneath the haughty pose, and Rowan was impressed by Conn's incredible speed in learning. Rowan is not in the least disturbed by Conn's lowly social status, and devoutly supports Conn.
- Willa Forestal - The Duchess and mother of Rowan. Rules the richer part of Wellmet: The Sunrise. Discontinuing the common practice of hiring a Ducal Magister, she dislikes magic and mistrusts wizards she deemed dangerous, such as Nevery and Connwaer. The Duchess is serious and has no sense of humour, but is also shown to be clever and cunning.
- Brumbee - The Principal of Academicos and a lifelong friend of Nevery, Brumbee is very knowledgeable, but indecisive and weak. According to Conn, what Brumbee would do in the face of arguments or crisis would be wringing his hands and saying 'Oh dear'. Brumbee is usually kind and soft-spoken, though easily flustered, as opposed to Nevery's temper. After Pettivox's death, he accepts Keeston as his apprentice.
- Underlord Crowe - Exerts control over the Twilight side of Wellmet. A cold, almost psychopathic individual with no regard for anyone except for himself; Conn states that Crowe "would kill his family to get what he wanted". He looks nondescript; neither short nor tall, neither handsome nor plain, has cold, empty grey eyes and oiled black hair. He works with Pettivox and was exiled after Conn foiled his schemes.
- Captain Kerrn - The Captain of the Dawn Palace Guards who serve to protect the Duchess. As she is very strict and true to her duties, she mistrusts and is very hostile towards Conn.

== Runic Messages ==
In "The Magic Thief" messages written in the Rune language are dotted throughout the book. Altogether, there are 10. They are as follows:

- First message, Page 13: "I picked the lock on your journal, Nevery. Conn"
- Second message, page 48: "I like Heartsease. Conn"
- Third message, page 71: "Who you calling servant boy? Conn"
- Fourth message, page 125: "Told you I was a wizard. Conn"
- Fifth message, page 164: "Cannot trust Crowe. Conn"
- Sixth message, page 226: "I am sorry, Nevery. Conn"
- Seventh message, page 278: "Figured out that myself. Conn"
- Eighth message, page 307: "You got it wrong, Nevery. Conn"
- Ninth message, page 328: "Must save the magic. Conn"
- Tenth message, page 395: "Thanks Nevery. Conn" "You are welcome, Conn. Nevery"

In "The Magic Thief" book 2 - LOST messages written in the Rune language are dotted throughout the book. Altogether, there are 11. They are as follows:

- First message, Page 10: "Read this well, Magisters, or you are greater fools than I thought."
- Second message, page 74: "Further note to self. Tell boy to be careful going to Twilight."
- Third message, page 116: "You ARE a wizard? - Embre."
- Fourth message, page 149: "Conn is just being stupid."
- Fifth message, page 175: "Miss boy."
- Sixth message, page 183: "Will it ever stop raining?"
- Seventh message, page 238: "Do not fail me, boy."
- Eighth message, page 251: "What do you think his locus stone looks like? - C"
- Ninth message, page 270: "Ro, be careful of the Shadows."
- Tenth message, page 278: "We must make all possible haste."
- Eleventh message, page 366: "I can come home, can't I, Nevery?"

In "The Magic Thief" book 3 - FOUND messages written in the Rune language are dotted throughout the book. Altogether, there are 16. They are as follows:

- First message, Page 11: "Ignore this note at your peril."
- Second message, page 21: "Must think more about pyrotechnic traps."
- Third message, page 41: "It is important."
- Fourth message, page 44: "This would be easier if you would reveal where you are hiding."
- Fifth message, page 68: "Send word when materials assembled."
- Sixth message, page 69: "At least I think I can."
- Seventh message, page 72: "Have you done pyrotechnics like this before?"
- Eighth message, page 73: "No I have not."
- Ninth message, page 117: "I will go after him."
- Tenth message, page 135: "I wonder what my new locus stone looks like."
- Eleventh message, page 148: "And we must defeat it."
- Twelfth message, page 164: "I saw the dragon. It is real."
- Thirteenth message, page 173: "Come now."
- Fourteenth message, page 189: "Where are you, boy?"
- Fifteenth message, page 305: "Very worried about sending Conn alone to rescue duchess."
- Sixteenth message, page 322: "Cannot bear the thought that he is dead."

In "The Magic Thief" book 4 - HOME messages written in the Rune language are dotted throughout the book. Altogether, there are 15. They are as follows:

- First Message, Page 43: "Find truncheon, talk to Fist about brass knuckles."
- Second Message, Page 43: "Buy ingredients for soup and biscuits at Sark Square"
- Third Message, Page 43: "Be sure Kerrn likes the colour blue."
- Fourth Message, Page 64: "Be careful what you do with Conn. He's like his dragon, he won't like being put in a cage."
- Fifth Message, Page 68: "Try not to be late."
- Sixth Message, Page 128: "Be careful. C"
- Seventh Message, Page 132: "And what do you mean signing your letter that way?"
- Eighth Message, Page 133: "Perhaps he should be put into prison cell. Would keep him out of trouble, at least."
- Ninth Message, Page 138: "No, boy, YOU be careful."
- Tenth Message, Page 190: "I will keep you apprised of further developments."
- Eleventh Message, Page 204: "Surely Conn himself didn't steal Peri's stone."
- Twelfth Message, Page 211: "Why didn't you answer my question? Why did you sign your letter to me this way [...] YOURS, Embre?"
- Thirteenth Message, Page 212: "What do you think I mean by YOURS?"
- Fourteenth Message, Page 287: "YOURS ALWAYS, is it? You terrify me."
- Fifteenth Message, Page 288: "Yes, I mean it."

== Reviews ==
The Magic Thief has received positive reviews from both Kirkus and the School Library Journal and Teens Read Too.com, claiming that it "stands out from the many fantasy novels on the shelves." KUER-FM hosted a summer book listing, in which book expert Catherine Weller recommended The Magic Thief.

== Popular culture ==
- On March 23, 2010, Sarah Prineas collaborated with the creators of AdventureQuest Worlds to do a special event. The release detailed the players coming to the aid of Conn when Nevery Flinglas and some other wizards are captured. They discover that Pettivox is in collaboration with Drakath in a plot to Chaorrupt all the magic in Lore.
