= Realm Media =

U.S. audio entertainment company

- Logo of Realm Media
- Founded: September 2015
- Founders: Julian Yap & Molly Barton
- Country of origin: United States
- Headquarters location: New York City
- Publication types: Serialized fiction; audio dramas; podcasts
- Official website: https://www.realm.fm/

Realm, formerly Serial Box, is an American audio entertainment company that creates original fiction podcasts and audiobook series, which include continuations of TV series. Realm's podcasts feature an array of production styles depending on the story, some with full casts, others with single voice narration. NPR described Realm as intending to serve as an "HBO for readers".

== History ==
In September 2015, Julian Yap and Molly Barton launched Serial Box. The first production was Bookburners, created by Max Gladstone. The writing process was based on television serials rather than novels. Founder Yap realized that he was reading fewer novels due to time constraints from work. Both Yap and Barton believe that serialized fiction will make reading more accessible and social.

In April 2021, Serial Box changed its name to Realm and released its productions globally as podcasts. The productions can be listened to for free with advertising, or with a subscription.

== Process ==
Realm hires a lead author, or showrunner, write a pilot episode and a "show bible" which will outline the plot for each season. After this, Realm brings together a team of writers who will contribute ideas in a manner similar to a television writers' room. At the end of this period, each author is assigned episodes to write. Whereas a novel generally takes 2–3 years to be written and published, a Realm production can be completed 6 months from the start date. Because the first episode is published before the season is completed, the authors can tailor the ending of the season to the audience's reactions. It is the responsibility of the showrunner to ensure that all episodes maintain a consistent writing style despite the involvement of multiple authors.

== Awards ==
Molly Barton, Jeff Li, James Stuart, and Julian Yap were nominated for the 2019 World Fantasy Professional Award for their work with Serial Box.

== Productions ==
Title	Number of seasons	Showrunner	Other authors
Alternis	1	N/A	Maurice Broaddus, Jacqueline Koyanagi, E.C. Myers, and Andrea Phillips
Blood & Gold	1	N/A	Jeffrey J. Mariotte, Peter Murrieta, and Greg Cox
Bookburners	5	Max Gladstone	Margaret Dunlap, Amal El-Mohtar, Mur Lafferty, Brian Francis Slattery, and Andrea Phillips
Born to the Blade	1	Michael R. Underwood	Marie Brennan, Cassandra Khaw, and Malka Older
Bullet Catcher	3	Joaquin Lowe	None
Dark Heights	2	CD Miller	None
Dead Air	1	Gwenda Bond	Rachel Caine and Carrie Ryan
Exquisite Corpse	1	N/A (prompts provided by Dread Central)	Richard Chizmar, Paul Cornell, Christopher Golden, Brian Keene, Cassandra Khaw, Stephen Kozeniewski, Nick Mamatas, Sisters of Slaughter (Michelle Garza and Melissa Lason), Paul Tremblay, and Alyssa Wong
False Idols	1	N/A	Lisa Klink, Patrick Lohier, Diana Renn, and Robert K. Wittman
First Street	1	Catherine McKenzie	Catherine McKenzie, Jasmine Guillory, Elyssa Friedland, Shawn Klomparens, Randy Susan Meyers, Kermit Roosevelt III
Geek Actually	1	N/A	Cathy Yardley, Melissa Blue, Rachel Stuhler, and Cecilia Tan
Gods and Lies	1	Elizabeth Vail	None
Knox	1	N/A	K Arsenault Rivera, Brooke Bolander, Gabino Iglesias, and Sunny Moraine
Machina	1	Fran Wilde	Fran Wilde, Malka Older, and Curtis C. Chen, with Martha Wells
Marvel's Black Panther: Sins of the King	1	N/A	Steven Barnes, Ira Madison III, Tananarive Due, Geoffrey Thorne, and Mohale Mashigo
Marvel's Black Widow: Bad Blood	1	N/A	Lindsay Smith, Margaret Dunlap, Mikki Kendall, L.L. McKinney, and Taylor Stevens
Marvel's Jessica Jones: Playing With Fire	1	N/A	Lauren Beukes, Vita Ayala, Sam Beckbessinger, Zoe Quinn, and Elsa Sjunneson
Marvel's Thor: Metal Gods	1	N/A	Aaron Stewart-Ahn, Jay Edidin, Brian Keene, and Yoon Ha Lee
A Most Dangerous Woman	1	Brenda Clough	None
Ninth Step Station	2	Malka Older	Curtis C. Chen, Jacqueline Koyanagi, and Fran Wilde
Orphan Black: The Next Chapter	2	Malka Older	Madeline Ashby, Mishell Baker, Heli Kennedy, E. C. Myers and Lindsay Smith
Outliers	1	Dave Beazley	Casey Wells. Voiced by Rory Culkin.
ReMade	2	Matthew Cody	Gwenda Bond, Amy Rose Capetta, Carrie Harris, E.C. Myers, Andrea Phillips, and Kiersten White
Silverwood: The Door	1	Brian Keene	Brian Keene, Richard Chizmar, Stephen Kozeniewski, Sisters of Slaughter (Michelle Garza and Melissa Lason)
Sonic the Hedgehog Presents: The Chaotix Casefiles	1	N/A	Ian Jones-Quartey, Dan Jolley, Ian Flynn, Evan Stanley
Spider King	1	Justin C. Key	None
Tremontaine	4	Ellen Kushner	Liz Duffy Adams, Patty Bryant, Joel Derfner, Tessa Gratton, Alaya Dawn Johnson, Malinda Lo, Karen Lord, Racheline Maltese, Mary Anne Mohanraj, Delia Sherman, and Pat Witcover.
The Triangle	1	Dan Koboldt	Mindy McGinnis and Sylvia Spruck Wrigley
The Vela	2	Yoon Ha Lee	Becky Chambers, SL Huang, and Rivers Solomon
Whitehall	2	Liz Duffy Adams	Mary Robinette Kowal, Madeleine Robins, Barbara Samuel, and Delia Sherman
The Witch Who Came in from the Cold	2	Max Gladstone and Lindsay Smith	Cassandra Rose Clarke, Michael Swanwick, Ian Tregillis, and Fran Wilde
Woodbine	2	Alex Nursall and Emily Kellogg	None
