= Navah Wolfe =

Editor of science fiction, fantasy and horror works

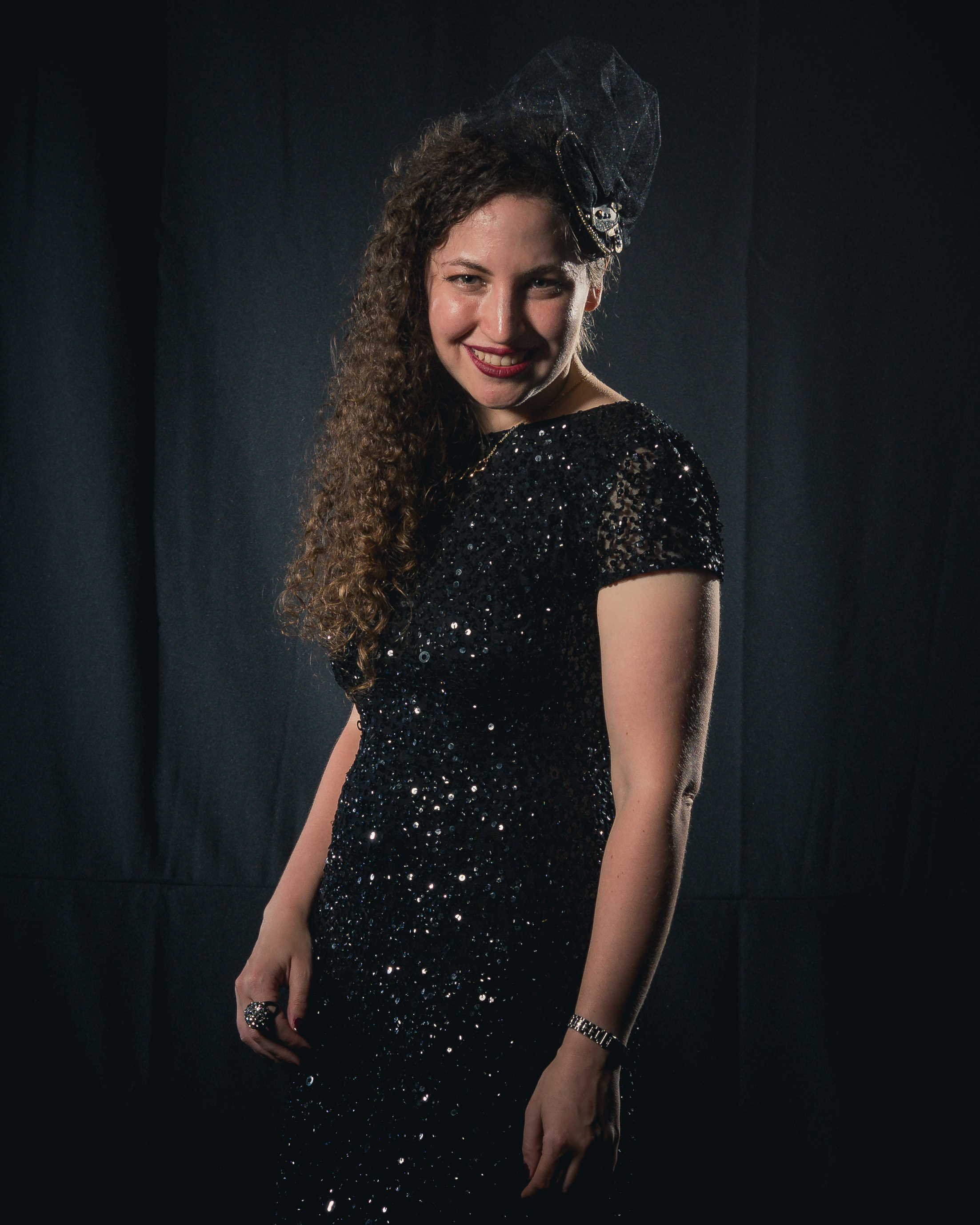
- Portrait photoshoot at Worldcon 75
- Children: 4

Navah Wolfe is a two-time Hugo Award winning American editor of science fiction, fantasy and horror works.

== Biography ==
Navah Wolfe went to college at Yeshiva University where she studied History and English. She won the Hugo Award for Best Editor (Long Form) in 2019 and 2020, having been nominated in 2017, 2018, 2021 and 2022. She has worked with some significant names in science fiction, fantasy and horror, her genre specialties for the past two decades. She is currently an Executive Editor at The Novelry. In the past, she has worked as an editor at DAW Books, Subterranean Press, Saga Press and Simon & Schuster Books for Young Readers. Wolfe has worked with Dominik Parisien to create a series of anthologies which have won Shirley Jackson Awards as well as being finalists for the World and British Fantasy Award. She lives in Connecticut with her husband and four children.

== Awards and nominations ==
Navah Wolfe won the Hugo for Best Editor (Long Form) in 2020 and 2019, and was a finalist for the award in 2017, 2018, 2021 and 2022.

Wolfe was also a finalist for the Locus Award for Best Editor in 2017, 2018, 2019 and 2020.

Her anthologies The Starlit Wood and Robots VS Fairies (co-edited with Dominik Parisien) both won the Shirley Jackson Award. Their anthology The Mythic Dream was a finalist for the Shirley Jackson Award as well. All three anthologies were finalists for the World Fantasy Award and Locus Awards.

Wolfe has worked on books that have won the Hugo Award, Nebula Award, Lambda Literary Award, BSFA Award, Aurora Award, and been finalists for the Locus Award, Bram Stoker Award, World Fantasy Award, and all other major industry awards.

== Anthologies with Dominik Parisien ==
- The Starlit Wood (2016), winner of the Shirley Jackson Award, finalist for the World Fantasy Award, British Fantasy Award and Locus Award.
- Robots Vs. Fairies (2018) winner of the Shirley Jackson Award, finalist for the World Fantasy Award and Locus Award.
- The Mythic Dream (2019) finalist for the Shirley Jackson Award, World Fantasy Award and Locus Award.

== Authors and works ==
Wolfe has worked with many authors, including:

- Amal El-Mohtar
- Max Gladstone
- Rivers Solomon
- Daveed Diggs
- Catherynne M. Valente
- Elizabeth Bear
- Theodora Goss
- Ursula Vernon
- Alexandra Rowland
- Mishell Baker
- Rachel Neumeier
- Cassandra Rose Clarke
- Kay Kenyon
- Genevieve Valentine
- Matt Wallace
- Jonathan Maberry
- Neal Shusterman
- Tim Federle
- Katherine Rundell
- Benjamin Alire Saenz
- Margaret Peterson Haddix
