= The Witch Who Came in from the Cold =

Alt history fantasy series

- Official cover art for "The Witch Who Came In From the Cold", print edition
- Author: Max Gladstone (creator), Lindsay Smith (creator), Cassandra Rose Clarke, Michael Swanwick, Ian Tregillis, and Fran Wilde
- Language: English
- Genre: Fantasy literature; Alternate history
- Publisher: Serial Box (Audio drama, ebook), Saga Press (Print)
- Media type: Audio drama; ebook; print
- Pages: 624 (Hardcover)
- ISBN: 978-1481485616

The Witch Who Came in from the Cold is a serialized alternate history fantasy publication by Serial Box. Like all Serial Box productions, it is available as an audio drama and an ebook. A print version is also available. The story is set in Prague in 1970, just after the Prague Spring. CIA spy Gabriel Pritchard engages in espionage against the KGB, particularly against Russian agent Tanya Morozova. His work is compromised when he is embroiled in a conflict between two warring groups of sorcerers known as the Ice and the Flame, who have infiltrated the intelligence agencies of all major world superpowers. Gabe and Tanya's loyalties to their countries and magical allies are tested as each group attempts to seize control of a Russian defector, who also happens to host a powerful elemental spirit. The story was followed by a second season in 2017. A third season is in development, but as of June 2018 it had not been greenlit.

== Plot summary ==
Season 1

Gabe Pritchard and Joshua Toms are CIA agents working in Prague in 1970. Two years ago in Cairo, Gabe experienced an accident in which he lost his memory of an entire day. Since that time, he has been afflicted by excruciating headaches. He botches a CIA mission due to one of these headaches, and his status at work falls into jeopardy. Tanya Morozova and her partner Nadia are both KGB agents and members of the Consortium of Ice. The Ice and the Flame are groups of sorcerers seeking to control all 36 hosts, human beings who are possessed by elementals. The Flame seeks to rid the world of all non-magic users, and the Ice wants to preserve the world as it is. Adula Zlata, a Czech college student, is one such host. Tanya tells Andula the truth about her identity, and Andula decides to accept the Ice's offer of protection. Gabe and Josh suspect that Tanya and Nadia are recruiting Andula for the KGB.

Jordan Rhemes, a bartender and sorcerer, was in Cairo at the time of Gabe's accident. She informs him that his headaches are related to magic. He interrupted a ritual by Flame Acolytes in which they attempted to create their own host. As a result, the elemental involved in the ritual attached itself to Gabe. The attachment was imperfect, resulting in headaches and seizures. Rhemes refers Gabe to Alestair Winthrop, an MI-6 agent and Ice member. Alestair teaches Gabe basic sorcery and helps him learn to control the elemental. Alestair and Josh begin a physical relationship, despite the fact that same-sex relationships are stigmatized by both Czech society and their own intelligence agencies.

Gabe discovers that the Ice is freezing hosts in stasis, preventing them from being used by the Flame while simultaneously imprisoning them. He reveals this information to Tanya; her loyalty to the Ice is shaken. Gabe accidentally uses his new powers to awaken a golem, which begins terrorizing Prague and murdering police officers. Gabe and Tanya work together to subdue the golem, leading to a tenuous alliance.

The CIA plans Operation Anchises, in which they will extract a Russian scientist and defector named Sokolov when he attends a scientific conference in Prague. They call in Dominic "Dom" Alvarez from Langley, Virginia to assist with the operation. Gabe uses magic to start a brawl at the conference. Josh and Alvarez extract Sokolov during the chaos and take him to a safe house.

Aleksander "Sasha" Komyetski, head of the KGB office in Prague and Flame Acolyte, discovers an illicit radio in Tanya's apartment. He uses the radio to blackmail her into invading the CIA safe house. Tanya attacks the safe house, but Gabe informs Dom that the KGB is on its way. Dom escapes with Sokolov, who is also a host. Gabe allows Tanya to escape rather than shooting her. When Dom's flight path deviates from its planned course, Gabe realizes that Dom is a Flame agent who now has Sokolov in custody. Gabe, Tanya, Nadia, Alestair, and Jordan work together to perform a ritual to bring down Dom's plane. Dom kills Sokolov and escapes via parachute; the CIA and KGB both try to piece together an understanding of these events without knowledge of the sorcery behind them.

== Background ==
Max Gladstone pitched the idea of a serialized spy thriller to Serial Box founder Julian Yap. Gladstone was interested in the city of Prague but had no expertise about the Cold War or espionage. Yap approached Lindsay Smith for the project. Smith has degrees in Russian studies and computer security. As of 2017, she worked as a cyber-intelligence expert for a private security firm. Gladstone and Smith served as show runners; they began by writing a "bible" for the series which mapped out the characters and plot lines. They then teamed up with four other authors in order to produce the story. The first season was written in batches of four episodes, and each group of episodes was reviewed for consistency. Each episode was read, reviewed, and edited by the authorial team. Unlike some Serial Box productions, each episode builds on the previous ones and advances the overall plot. Though episodes are not designed to stand alone, the team wanted each episode to feel like its own small story, in the style of a television episode.

== Reception ==
Publishers Weekly praised the writing team and called the drama "brilliantly conceptualized and executed". Writing for Locus, Liz Bourke praised the vividly-drawn characters and the consistency of the serial's tone despite multiple different authors. A reviewer from Tor.com praised the prose's quick wit and appreciated the complexity of the cast of characters.

== See also ==
- The Spy Who Came in from the Cold
