= The Craft Sequence =

Series of fantasy novels by Max Gladstone

- Cover art for Three Parts Dead, the first book in the series by publication order
- Three Parts Dead; Two Serpents Rise; Full Fathom Five; Last First Snow; Four Roads Cross; The Ruin of Angels
- Author: Max Gladstone
- Country: United States
- Language: English
- Publisher: Tor.com
- Published: Oct 2, 2012 – Sep 5, 2017
- Media type: Print
- No. of books: 6
- Website: https://maxgladstone.com/series/the-craft-sequence/

The Craft Sequence is a series of urban fantasy novels by American author Max Gladstone. It currently consists of six novels, beginning with Three Parts Dead (2012). The sequence received critical acclaim. It was nominated for the 2017 Hugo Award for Best Series.

Starting in 2023, Gladstone wrote a second series in the same universe, the Craft Wars.

== Plot ==
=== Three Parts Dead ===
Forty years before the start of the novel, Craftspeople and gods fight in the God Wars. Seril, the moonlight goddess of the city of Alt Coulumb, is killed. The Guardians of Seril, gargoyles, are exiled from Alt Coulumb. Alexander Denovo, a powerful Craftsman, is hired to resurrect Seril. He uses Seril's corpse to create a replacement goddess named Justice.

As the novel begins, Tara Abernathy is a student of the Craft. The Craft is a system of magic based on contracts and laws. She discovers that Professor Denovo has been stealing his students’ powers and controlling their minds. She burns Denovo's laboratory and is exiled from the school as punishment. Tara is hired by Elayne Kavarian, a Craftswoman and rival of Denovo's.

Kos, the fire god of Alt Coulumb and former lover of Seril, dies under mysterious circumstances. Kavarian is hired by the clergy to investigate, and she brings Tara to the city with her. Their companions include Abelard, a priest of Kos, as well as Catherine, a servant of Justice. They are opposed by Denovo, who is representing the creditors to whom Kos had pledged his power. A local judge is murdered, and Justice suspects that the exiled gargoyles are the perpetrators. Tara, believing that the cases are linked, investigates further.

Tara discovers that Denovo murdered Kos and plans to take his place as the city's god. Elayne and Tara resurrect Kos and reunite the spirit of Seril with Justice. Denovo is arrested, and Tara decides to remain in the city to assist with the aftermath of the case. Elayne visits Denovo in prison and murders him with his own shadow, leaving no evidence.

=== Two Serpents Rise ===
In the desert city of Dresediel Lex, Caleb Altemoc works as a risk manager for Red King Consolidated (RKC), which controls the flow of water in the city. His friend Teo also works at RKC. Caleb has a contentious relationship with his father Temoc. As a priest, Temoc was responsible for human sacrifice, a practice which has been outlawed since the priests lost the God Wars. Temoc is now a guerrilla fighter and a wanted terrorist. RKC is led by the King in Red, a powerful undead Craftsman. The King in Red had fought in the God Wars to avenge his lover, who was killed as a human sacrifice. Caleb investigates after a guard is killed by a demon in an RKC reservoir. He finds a woman named Mal trespassing at the scene, but she escapes.

The King in Red asks Caleb to represent the firm in a potential deal to acquire Heartstone Company. Heartstone is drawing power from two massive, slumbering serpents, which were once worshipped in Dresediel Lex. When the deal is signed, Caleb learns that Mal is a high-ranking Heartstone executive. One of the conditions for the Heartstone acquisition is that RKC will never allow the serpents to wake.

Demons begin appearing in the city’s water supply, leading to social unrest. Mal and Caleb are instructed to fix the contamination. Together, Caleb and Mal defeat a rogue Craftswoman from Heartstone who had damaged the city’s water. They grow close and begin a romantic relationship, but they quarrel after Caleb learns that Mal still worships the old gods.

Mal awakens the serpents. As a follower of the old gods, she plans to force RKC out of the city. RKC has been substantially weakened by its contractual obligation to keep the serpents asleep. Caleb, Teo, and Temoc break into RKC headquarters. Caleb and Teo want to destroy the Heartstone contract. Temoc believes that the best way to send the serpents back to sleep is to resume human sacrifice instead. He prepares to sacrifice Teo, but she escapes and destroys the contract. The King in Red regains much of his strength, and Temoc flees. Caleb feeds RKC's power into the serpents, sating them and sending them to sleep once again. Mal disappears, presumably killed in the conflict. Caleb retires from RKC and starts his own firm, desiring peace between theists and Craftspeople.

=== Full Fathom Five ===
The island of Kavekana lost its native gods in the God Wars. Now, Priestess Kai builds artificial gods for her clients. Kai risks her life to save a dying idol named 7 Alpha, but fails. As 7 Alpha dies, Kai hears her speak, which should be impossible as idols are not supposed to be intelligent. Kai’s boss Jace demotes her for her recklessness. Kai is assigned to sell an idol to Teo of the Two Serpents Group.

Ms. Kavarian represents 7 Alpha’s clients and is hired to investigate her death. At a poetry competition, Kai hears a man named Edmund recite 7 Alpha’s dying words and decides to investigate. She asks her ex-boyfriend Claude, a police officer, to take Edmund into protective custody.

On Kavekana, convicted criminals are placed into statues called Penitents and forced to serve as law enforcement. A street urchin named Izza helps rescue a woman from Penitents. This woman is Catherine, a servant of Seril from Alt Coulomb. Izza tells stories about the Blue Lady, a dead goddess who used to protect street children. It is eventually revealed that the Blue Lady is 7 Alpha. Edmund is killed by a Penitent. Izza and Kai begin working together. Kai learns that Jace is killing any idols who exhibit consciousness. All of these idols are mouthpieces for a larger goddess, who is still alive and is being kept prisoner. Jace places Kai and Teo inside Penitents; Izza helps them escape. Teo reveals she and Catherine are working for Seril, hoping to retrieve a piece of Seril’s soul that Kavekana’s priests had stolen from Alt Coulomb.

Claude arrests Jace. Cat and Teo retrieve the stolen piece of Seril’s soul before leaving the island. Izza becomes the priestess of Kavekana’s new goddess. Izza and Kai work to end the Penitent system and bring Kavekana into a new future together.

== Structure ==
=== In order of publication ===
1. Three Parts Dead (2012)
2. Two Serpents Rise (2013)
3. Full Fathom Five (2014)
4. Last First Snow (2015)
5. Four Roads Cross (2016)
6. The Ruin of Angels (2017)

=== In internal chronological order ===
1. Last First Snow
2. Two Serpents Rise
3. Three Parts Dead
4. Four Roads Cross
5. Full Fathom Five
6. The Ruin of Angels

Internal chronological order is indicated by the number in each title.

== Major themes ==
In the novels, magic is real and works similarly to corporate law. The series drew inspiration from James C. Scott's book Seeing Like a State to explore the definition of corporations and governments. The magical system of the novel is used to explore globalization, capitalism, and debt.

Liz Bourke describes Last First Snow as an "intensely political book". She writes that the novel explores the conflict between conservatism and progress by contrasting the age of gods with the age of commerce. It also explores community organizing and mass protest.

== Publication history ==
Each novel is a standalone set in the same universe, so the novels can be read in any order. The numbers in the titles of the first five novels indicate the internal chronological order of the series. Gladstone states that this stemmed from his experience growing up in a small town in Tennessee, where the local bookstore often did not stock complete book series all at once.

== Reception ==
Publishers Weekly gave Three Parts Dead a starred review, praising the "suspenseful and fast-paced" story as well as the "diverse female-led cast". A review in Kirkus Reviews praised the strong female characters in Three Parts Dead, as well as the creative worldbuilding. The same review found that the novel's conclusion was "slightly clumsy", but otherwise praised the plot.

Publishers Weekly also gave a starred review to Two Serpents Rise, calling Caleb an "engaging protagonist" and comparing the city of Dresediel Lex to an alternate Los Angeles, complete with "its own versions of ethnic tensions and environmental strain". Kirkus Reviews called the setting "Aztec-inspired", and suggested that Gladstone's descriptions of the city may offer "a metaphor for end-stage capitalism". Their review called the novel "highly unusual" and "worth a try".

Writing for NPR, author Amal El-Mohtar praised the cover art for Full Fathom Five, stating that she was drawn to a novel that portrayed two women of color without falling into the sexualized stereotypes common in urban fantasy novels' cover art. El-Mohtar wrote that the series contained "some of the smartest, most original and sophisticated world-building I've read in years", and particularly praised the female-led cast of Full Fathom Five. Liz Bourke wrote that Full Fathom Five is "engaged in a conversation" with the fantasy genre, due in part to its modernity and the diversity of its cast. She called the novel "his best yet". Publishers Weekly gave a starred review to Full Fathom Five, praising the novel for its transgender heroine Kai in addition to the other diverse cast members. The review praised the novel and stated that Gladstone "continues to trump his already considerable accomplishments".

Publishers Weekly wrote a starred review for Last First Snow, praising its "sly satire of current socioeconomic issues" and writing that the novels of the Craft Sequence are "always enthralling and somehow consistently improving with every book". Four Roads Cross also received a starred review from Publishers Weekly, applauding the return of Tara Abernathy and the cast from Three Parts Dead. The review commended Gladstone's "storytelling, worldbuilding, and character development", calling the novel "a splendid continuation of a fascinating series". The Ruin of Angels received a starred review as well, which particularly praised the way the novel handled its transgender characters. The same review also wrote that the novel was "surprising" and made the setting "feel even more vivid and real than it did before".

Three Parts Dead was shortlisted for the 2014 Mythopoeic Award for Adult Fantasy. Full Fathom Five was nominated for the 2015 Locus Award for Best Fantasy Novel. The entire series was nominated for the 2017 Hugo Award for Best Series.
