= Max Gladstone =

American fantasy author (born 1984)

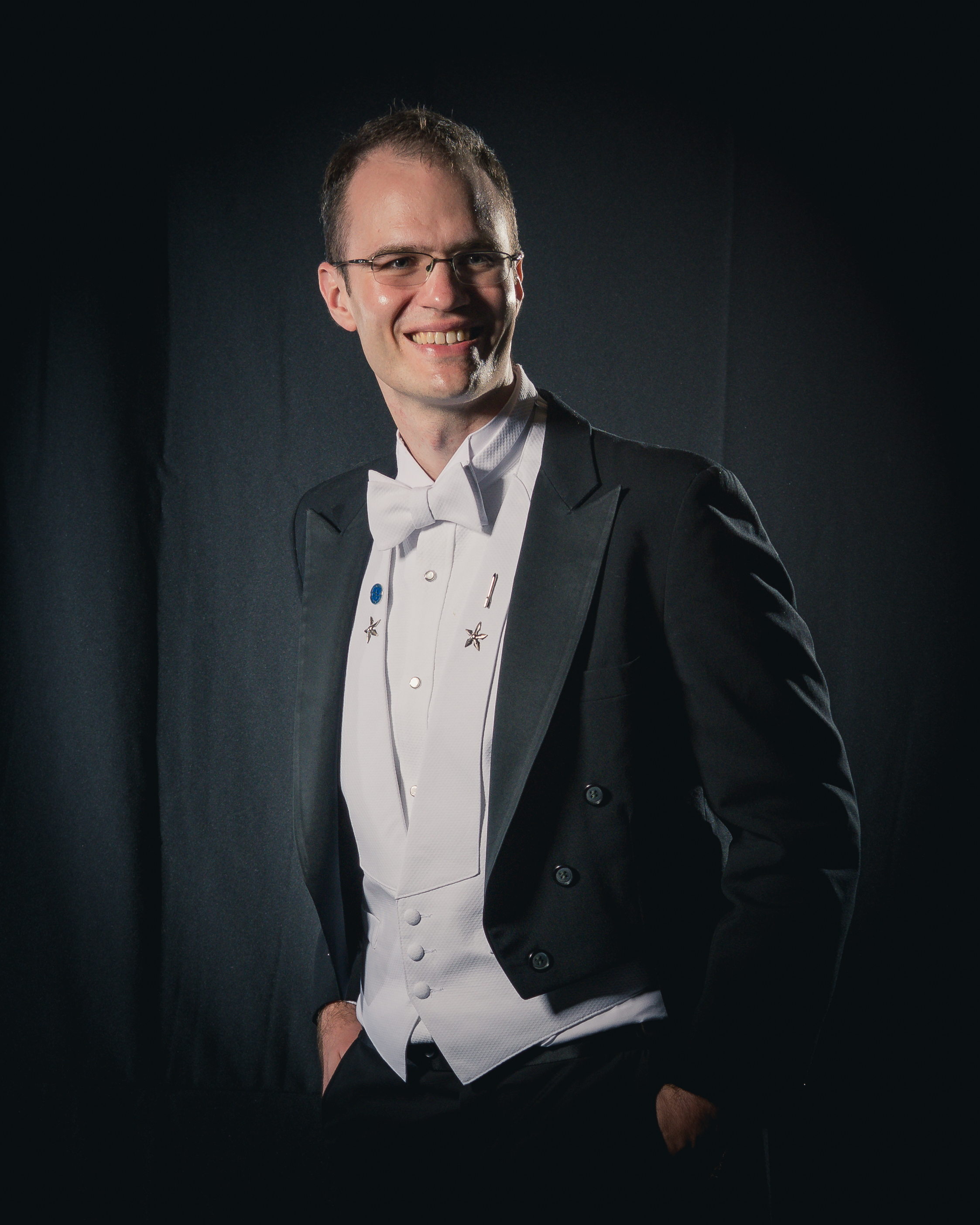
- Max Gladstone at Worldcon in Helsinki 2017.
- Born: May 28, 1984 (age 42)
- Education: Yale University
- Occupation: Novelist
- Writing career
- Language: English
- Years active: 2012–present
- Genres: Urban fantasy Fantasy
- Notable works: Three Parts Dead; Bookburners; This Is How You Lose the Time War
- Website: maxgladstone.com

Max Gladstone (born May 28, 1984) is an American author. He is best known for his 2012 debut novel, Three Parts Dead, part of The Craft Sequence, and his urban fantasy serial Bookburners. He is also known for co-authoring the award winning 2019 novella This Is How You Lose the Time War.

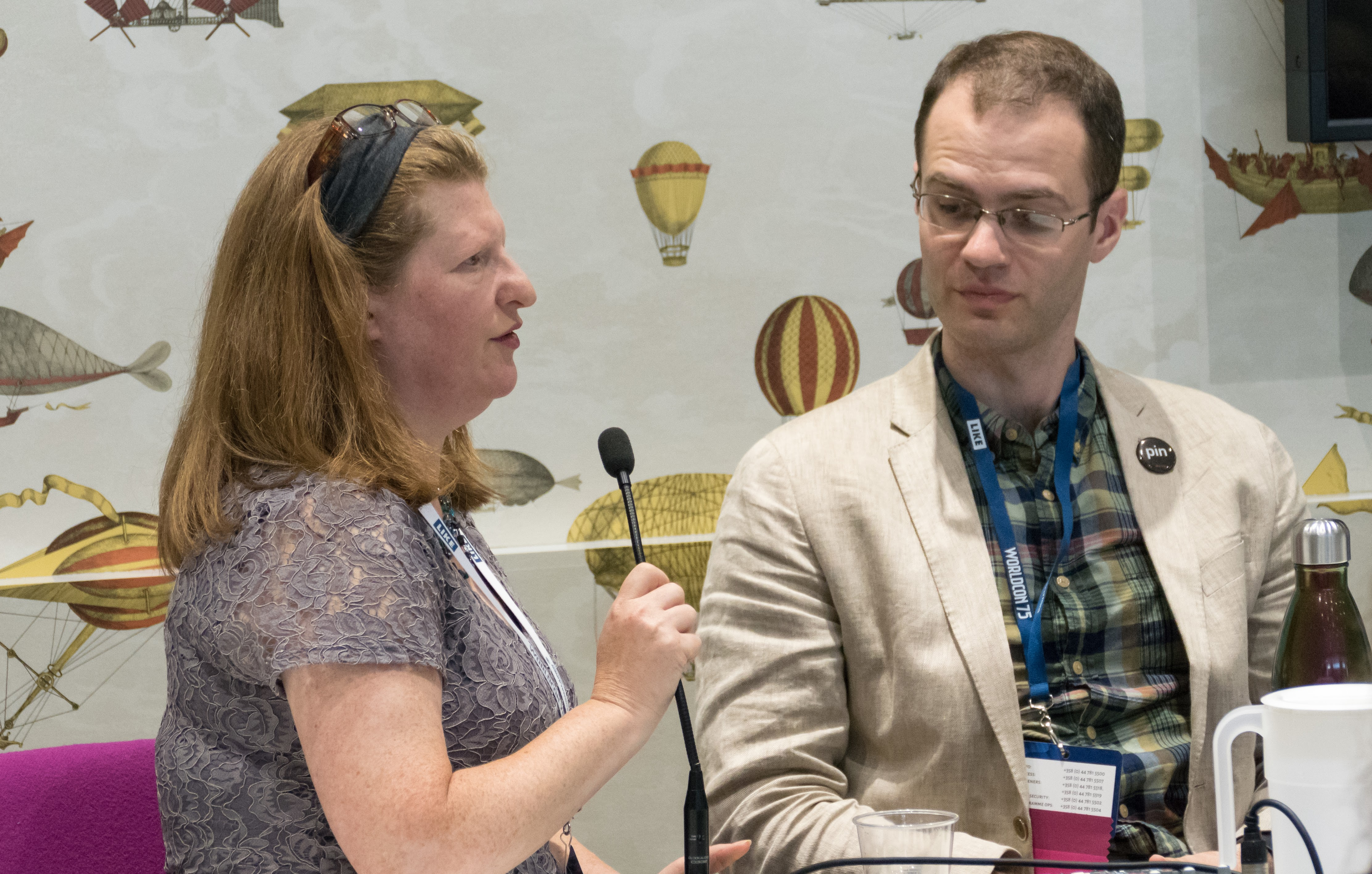
Historian Farah Mendlesohn and Max Gladstone at Worldcon Helsinki, 2017

Gladstone is a graduate of Yale University where he studied Chinese. He has worked in China, including as a teacher in a rural area of Anhui from 2006 to 2008 and as a translator for a car magazine. In 2013, Gladstone was a finalist for the John W. Campbell Award for Best New Writer.

== Career ==
=== The Craft Sequence ===
Gladstone's first novel, Three Parts Dead, was published by Tor Books on October 2, 2012 to positive reception. It was followed by Two Serpents Rise in 2013, Full Fathom Five in 2014, Last First Snow in 2015, and Four Roads Cross in 2016, all part of his Craft Sequence. The sixth novel, Ruin of Angels, was published by Tor.com in 2017. It will be followed by both novel and novella-length works starting in 2018.

=== Serial Box Publishing ===
In September 2015, Serial Box Publishing launched Bookburners, a weekly urban fantasy serial created by Gladstone and written by a team of authors consisting of himself, Margaret Dunlap, Mur Lafferty, and Brian Francis Slattery. The first season ran from September to December 2015 for 16 episodes: Gladstone wrote the pilot as well as episodes 7, 11, and 16. In January 2016, Serial Box renewed Bookburners for a second season, set to premiere in Summer 2016.

Gladstone's newest serial, The Witch Who Came in from the Cold, co-created with Lindsay Smith, launched in January 2016 from Serial Box. The serial, written by Gladstone, Smith, Cassandra Rose Clarke, Ian Tregillis, and Michael Swanwick, is a Cold War supernatural spy thriller set in the 1970s. The first season is set to run for 13 episodes. Simon & Schuster's Saga Press imprint released print collections of the first season of Bookburners in January 2017. A collection of season one of The Witch Who Came in From the Cold will be published in June 2017.

=== Other work ===
Gladstone is to write a Pathfinder Roleplaying Game tie-in novel for Paizo Publishing. Since 2016, he is also part of the team of writers working on George R. R. Martin's Wild Cards anthology series. The Highway Kind, a fantasy road trip novel, was announced for publication in 2018 by Tor Books but has not yet seen print. Gladstone's novel Empress of Forever, a space opera, was published in 2019.

Gladstone co-wrote the 2019 novella This Is How You Lose the Time War with Amal El-Mohtar. The book won numerous awards, including 2019 BSFA Award, 2019 Nebula Award, and 2020 Hugo Award.

== Awards ==
| Year | Title | Award | Category | Result | Ref |
|---|---|---|---|---|---|
| 2013 | — | John W. Campbell Award for Best New Writer | — | Finalist | |
| 2014 | Three Parts Dead | Mythopoeic Award | Fantasy – Adult | Finalist | |
| 2017 | The Craft Sequence | Hugo Award | Series | Finalist | |
| 2019 | This is How You Lose the Time War | BSFA Award | Shorter Fiction | Won | |
| 2019 | This is How You Lose the Time War | Nebula Award | Novella | Won | |
| 2019 | This is How You Lose the Time War | Kitschies | Novella | Finalist | |
| 2019 | This is How You Lose the Time War | Los Angeles Times Book Prize | Ray Bradbury Prize | Finalist | |
| 2019 | This is How You Lose the Time War | Shirley Jackson Award | Novella | Finalist | |
| 2020 | This is How You Lose the Time War | Aurora Award | Short Fiction | Won | |
| 2020 | This is How You Lose the Time War | Hugo Award | Novella | Won | |
| 2020 | This is How You Lose the Time War | Locus Award | Novella | Won | |
| 2020 | This is How You Lose the Time War | Ignyte Award | Novella | Won | |
| 2020 | This is How You Lose the Time War | Theodore Sturgeon Award | — | Second Place | |
| 2026 | The Craft Wars | Hugo Award | Series | Finalist | |

== Bibliography ==
=== Novels ===
- Empress of Forever (2019), ISBN 978-0765395818
- Last Exit (2022), ISBN 978-0765335739

=== The Craft Sequence ===
1. Three Parts Dead (2012), ISBN 978-0765333100
2. Two Serpents Rise (2013), ISBN 978-0765333124
3. Full Fathom Five (2014), ISBN 978-0-7653-3574-6
4. Last First Snow (2015), ISBN 978-0-7653-7940-5
5. Four Roads Cross (2016), ISBN 978-1466868410
6. The Ruin of Angels (2017), ISBN 978-0-7653-9589-4

=== The Craft Wars ===
1. Dead Country (2023), ISBN 978-0765395917
2. Wicked Problems (2024), ISBN 978-0765395931
3. Dead Hand Rule (2025), ISBN 978-1250290366

=== Standalone novella ===
- This Is How You Lose the Time War (with Amal El-Mohtar, 2019), ISBN 978-1529405231

=== Serial fiction ===
- Bookburners (created by Gladstone)
  - Bookburners Season One (with Margaret Dunlap, Mur Lafferty, and Brian Francis Slattery) (2017)
    - Episode 1: "Badge, Book, and Candle" (2015)
    - Episode 7: "Now and Then" (2015)
    - Episode 11: "Codex Umbra" (2015)
    - Episode 16: "Siege" (2015)
  - Bookburners Season Two (with Dunlap, Lafferty, Slattery, Andrea Phillips, and Amal El-Mohtar)
    - Episode 1: "Creepy Town" (2016)
    - Episode 6: "Incognita" (2016)
    - Episode 13: "The End of the Day" (2016)
  - Bookburners Season Three (with Dunlap, Lafferty, Phillips, and Slattery)
    - Episode 1: "Bubbles of Earth" (2017)
    - Episode 6: "Oracle Bones" (2017)
    - Episode 13: "Live in London" (2017)
  - Bookburners Season Four (with Dunlap, Lafferty, Phillips, and Slattery)
    - Episode 1: "Body Problems" (2018)
    - Episode 10: "Alexandria Leaving" (2018)
- The Witch Who Came in from the Cold (co-created by Gladstone & Lindsay Smith)
  - The Witch Who Came in from the Cold Season One (with Lindsay Smith, Cassandra Rose Clarke, Ian Tregillis, and Michael Swanwick) (forthcoming, 2017)
    - Episode 1: "A Long, Cold Winter" (with Lindsay Smith, 2016)
    - Episode 3: "Double Blind" (2016)
    - Episode 9: "Head Case" (2016)
    - Episode 13: "Company Time" (with Lindsay Smith, 2016)
  - The Witch Who Came in from the Cold Season Two (with Smith, Clarke, Tregillis, and Fran Wilde)
    - Episode 2: "Complicating Factors" (2017)
    - Episode 8: "What's Gone, What's Left Behind" (2017)
    - Episode 11: "Absent Friends" (2017)

=== Interactive fiction ===
- Choice of the Deathless (2013)
- Deathless: The City's Thirst (2015)

Both games, published by Choice of Games, are set in the Craft Sequence universe.

=== Short fiction ===
- "The Mask on the Island", On The Premises Magazine #3 (2007)
- "On Starlit Seas", The Book of Exodi, ed. Michael K. Eidson (2009)
- "The Four Modernizations", Necrotic Tissue #9 (2010)
- "Drona's Death", xo Orpheus: 50 New Myths, ed. Kate Bernheimer (2013)
- "The Angelus Guns", Tor.com, ed. Marco Palmieri (2014)
- "A Kiss With Teeth", Tor.com, ed. Marco Palmieri, ISBN 978-1466884557 (2014)
- "Man in the Middle", Shared Nightmares, eds. Steven Diamond an Nathan Shumate (2014)
- "Late Nights at the Cape and Cane", Uncanny Magazine (2014)
- "The Iron Man", The Grimm Future, ed. Erin Underwood (2016)
- "Big Thrull and the Askin’ Man", Uncanny Magazine (2016)
- "Giants in the Sky", The Starlit Wood, eds. Dominik Parisien and Navah Wolfe (2016)
- "The Scholast in the Low Waters Kingdom", Tor.com, ed. Marco Palmieri (2017)
- "Crispin's Model", Tor.com, ed. Marco Palmieri (2017)
- "To a Cloven Pie", Robots vs. Fairies, eds. Dominik Parisien and Navah Wolfe (2018)
- "Fitting In: A Wild Cards Story", Tor.com, ed. George R. R. Martin (2018)
- "The Secret Life of Rubberband", Texas Hold'em, ed. George R. R. Martin (2018)
- "The Man Who Captured Luke Skywalker", From a Certain Point of View: Return of the Jedi, (Del Rey, August 2023)
