= Annalee Newitz =

American author, journalist, and editor (born 1969)

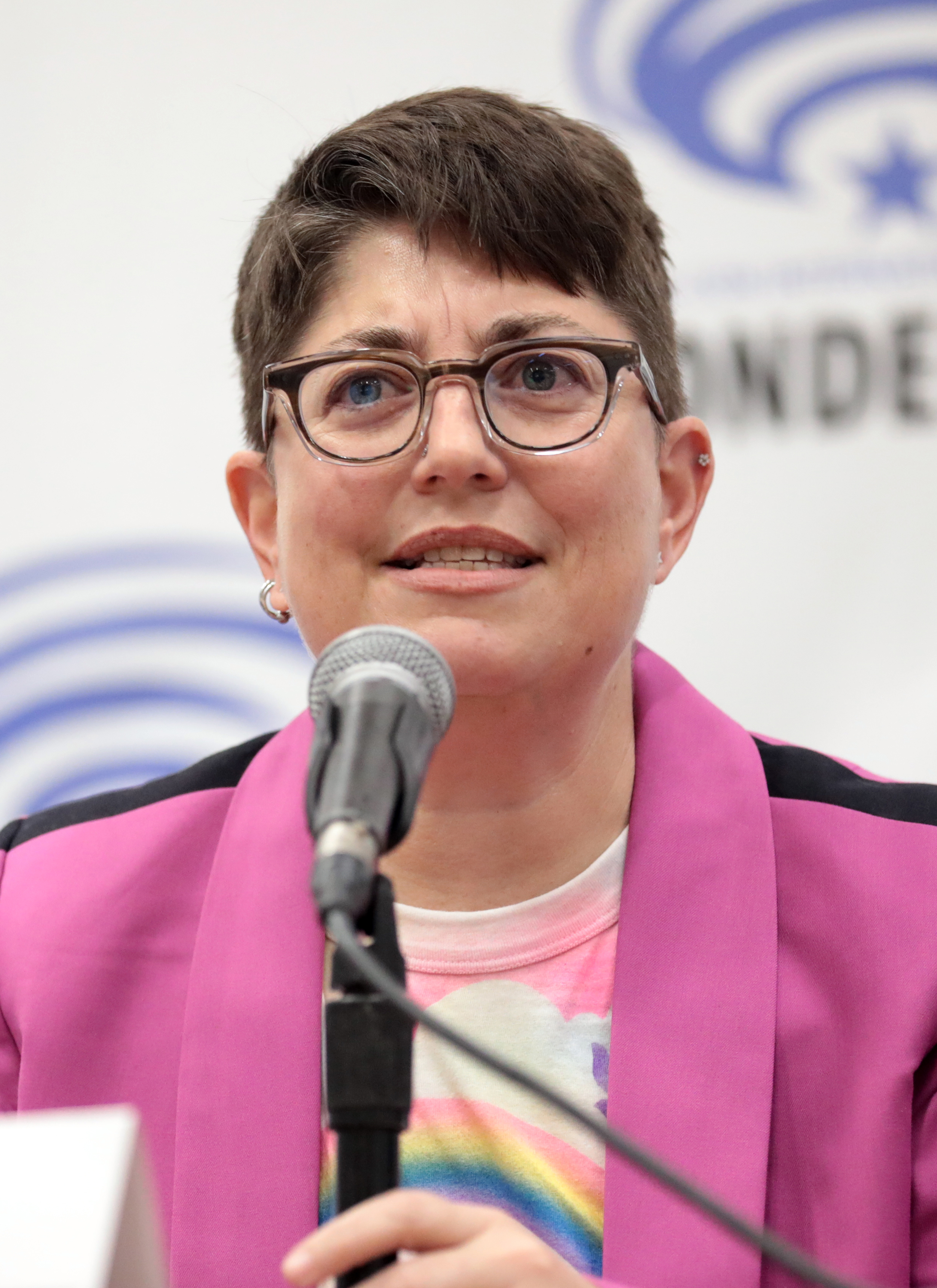
- Newitz at the 2023 WonderCon
- Born: May 7, 1969 (age 57); Irvine, California, U.S.
- Education: University of California, Berkeley
- Occupations: Journalist; editor; author
- Website: techsploitation.com

Annalee Newitz (born May 7, 1969) is an American journalist, editor, and author of both fiction and nonfiction. From 1999 to 2008, Newitz wrote a syndicated weekly column called Techsploitation, and from 2000 to 2004 was the culture editor of the San Francisco Bay Guardian. In 2004, Newitz became a policy analyst at the Electronic Frontier Foundation. With Charlie Jane Anders, they also co-founded Other magazine, a periodical that ran from 2002 to 2007. From 2008 to 2015, Newitz was editor-in-chief of Gawker-owned media venture io9, and subsequently its direct descendant Gizmodo, Gawker's design and technology blog. They have written for the periodicals Popular Science, Film Quarterly and Wired, and in 2026, was named Editor in Chief of Starlog. As of 2019, Newitz is a contributing opinion writer at The New York Times.

== Early life ==
Newitz was born in 1969, and grew up in Irvine, California, graduating from Irvine High School, and in 1987 moved to Berkeley, California. In 1996, Newitz started doing freelance writing, and in 1998 completed a Ph.D. in English and American Studies from UC Berkeley, with a dissertation on images of monsters, psychopaths, and capitalism in twentieth century American popular culture, the content of which later appeared in book form from Duke University Press.

Around 1999, Newitz co-founded the Post-World War II American Literature and Culture Database in an attempt to chronicle modern literature and popular culture.

== Career ==
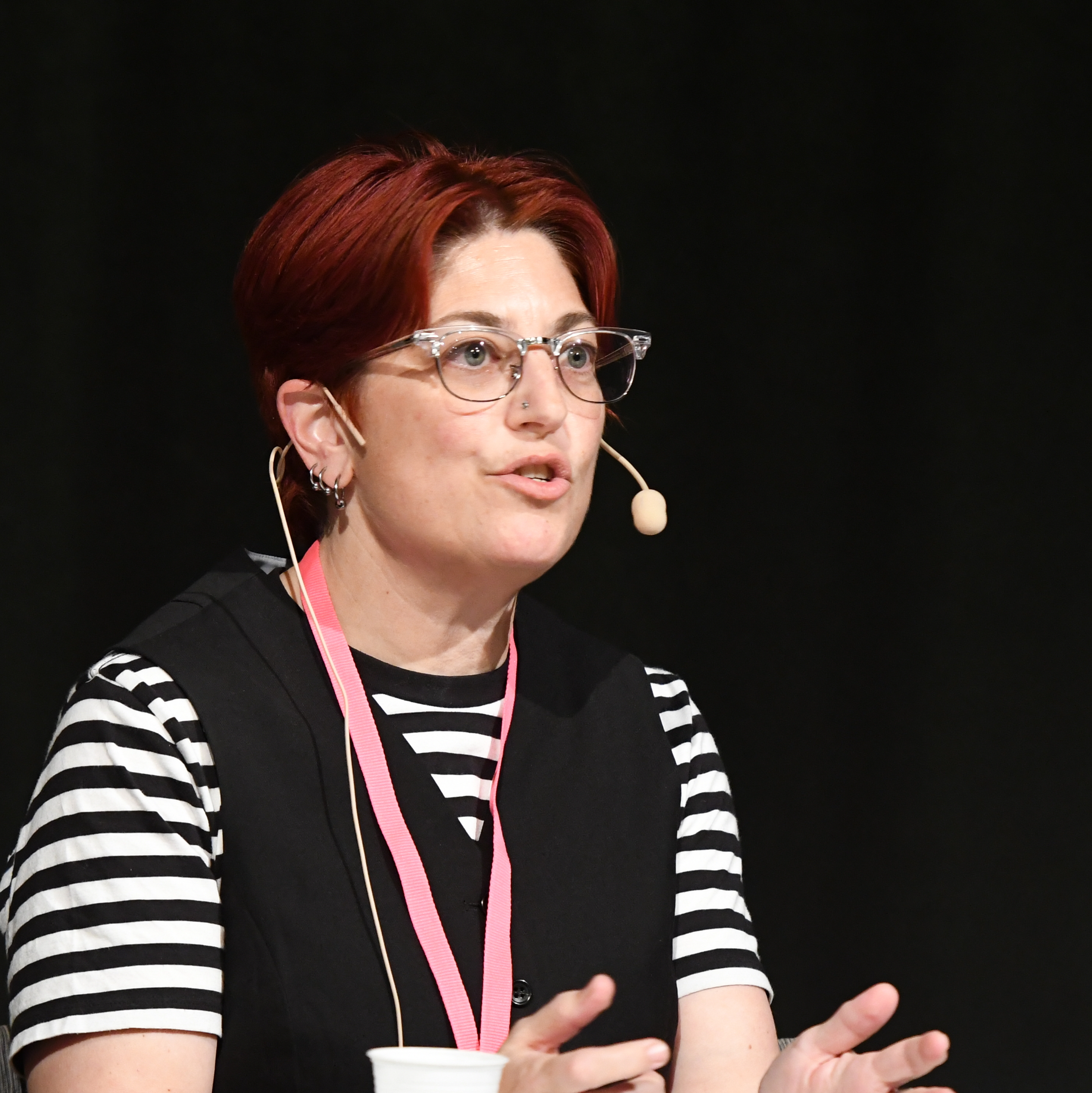
Newitz in 2019

Newitz became a full-time writer and journalist in 1999 with an invitation to write a weekly column for the Metro Silicon Valley, a column which then ran in various venues for nine years. Then they served as the culture editor at the San Francisco Bay Guardian from 2000 to 2004.

Newitz was awarded a Knight Science Journalism Fellowship for 2002 to 2003, supporting them as a research fellow at Massachusetts Institute of Technology. From 2004 to 2005 Newitz was a policy analyst for the Electronic Frontier Foundation, and from 2007 to 2009 was on the board of Computer Professionals for Social Responsibility. Newitz and Charlie Jane Anders, a Hugo Award-winning author and commentator, co-founded Other magazine.

In 2008, Gawker media asked Newitz to start a blog about science and science fiction, dubbed io9, for which Newitz served as editor-in-chief from its founding until 2015 when it merged with Gizmodo, another Gawker media design and technology blog property; Newitz then took on the same leadership of the new venture. In November 2015, Newitz left Gawker to join Ars Technica, where Newitz has been employed as tech culture editor since December 2015. Newitz is a contributing opinion writer at The New York Times.

Newitz's first novel, Autonomous, was published in 2017. Autonomous won the Lambda Literary Award and was nominated for the Nebula Award and Locus Award in 2018 for best novel.

Newitz's second novel, The Future of Another Timeline, published in 2019, was described on their website as: "[...] about time travel and what it would be like to meet yourself as a teenager and have a really, really intense conversation with her about how fucked up your high school friends are." The book was received with acclaim by critics, and was a nominee for the Locus Award for Best Science Fiction Novel.

External videos
- Presentation by Newitz on Scatter, Adapt, and Remember, May 22, 2013, C-SPAN
- Washington Journal interview with Newitz on the Discover article "How to Death-Proof a City" (based on Scatter, Adapt, and Remember), June 5, 2013, C-SPAN

Their 2014 non-fiction science book Scatter, Adapt, and Remember: How Humans Will Survive a Mass Extinction was a finalist for the L.A. Times Book Prize. They also wrote Four Lost Cities: A Secret History of the Urban Age, published in 2021.

They have also written for publications including Wired, Popular Science, The New Yorker, The Atlantic, Slate, The Washington Post, Smithsonian, and more. They have published short stories in Lightspeed, Shimmer Magazine, Apex, and Technology Review's Twelve Tomorrows.

In March 2018, with their partner and co-host Charlie Jane Anders, Newitz launched the podcast Our Opinions Are Correct, which "explor[es] the meaning of science fiction, and how it's relevant to real-life science and society." The podcast won the Hugo Award for Best Fancast in 2019.

In June 2026, Newitz announced the resurrection of Starlog magazine as editor-in-chief, with its first issue set to arrive on newsstands November 13, 2026, alongside the launch of a weekly podcast from Jordan Hoffman and Dave Gonzales that launched on June 24, 2026 with Newitz being its first guest.

== Personal life ==
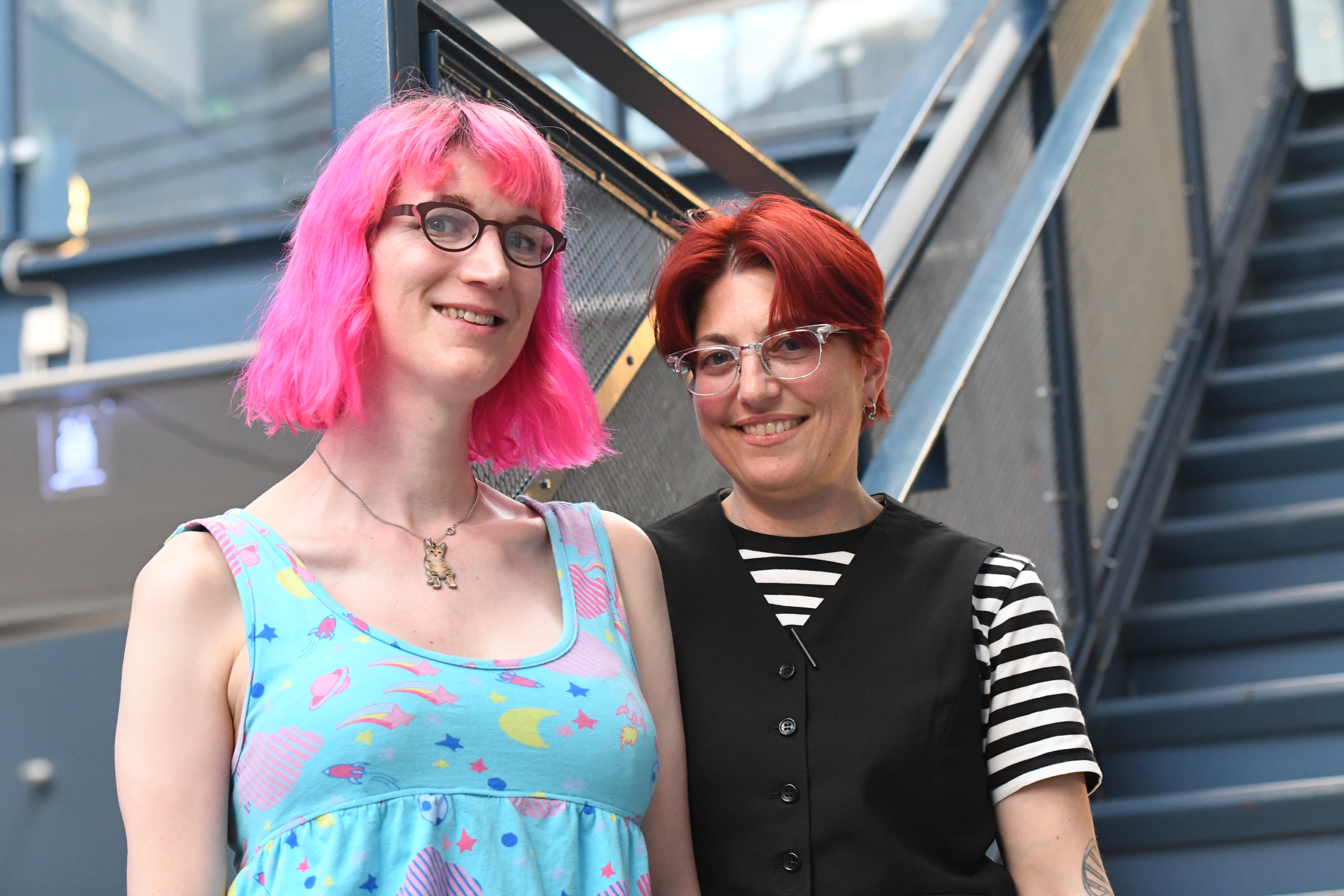
Charlie Jane Anders and Annalee Newitz at Swecon 2019

Newitz is the child of two English teachers. Their mother, Cynthia, worked at a high school, and their father, Marty, at a community college. Since 2000, Newitz has been in a relationship with Charlie Jane Anders.

Newitz is non-binary, and has used they/them pronouns since 2019.

== Venues ==
- Co-founder, Bad Subjects, 1992
- Co-founder, other (magazine), 2002
- Co-founder, Editor in chief, io9.com, Gawker Media's science and science fiction blog
- Editor in chief, Gizmodo, Gawker Media's technology blog
- Tech culture editor, Ars Technica
- Editor-in-chief, Starlog, 2026

== Awards and nominations ==
Year	Work	Award	Category	Result	Ref
2014	Scatter, Adapt, and Remember: How Humans Will Survive a Mass Extinction	Los Angeles Times Book Award	Science and Technology	Nominated	
2018	Autonomous	John W. Campbell Memorial Award	—	Shortlisted	
2018	Autonomous	Lambda Literary Award	SF/Fantasy/Horror	Won	
2018	Autonomous	Locus Award	First Novel	Finalist	
2018	Autonomous	Nebula Award	Novel	Nominated	
2019	When Robot and Crow Saved East St. Louis	Theodore Sturgeon Award	—	Won	
2019	Our Opinions Are Correct	Hugo Award	Fancast	Won	
2019	The Future of Another Timeline	Goodreads Choice Award	Science Fiction	Nominated	
2019	The Future of Another Timeline	Sidewise Award	Long form	Won	
2020	The Future of Another Timeline	Locus Award	Science Fiction Novel	Finalist	
2023	The Terraformers	Nebula Award	Novel	Nominated	
2025	Automatic Noodle	Nebula Award	Novella	Finalist	
2026	Automatic Noodle	Hugo Award	Novella	Finalist	
2026	Automatic Noodle	Locus Award	Novella	Finalist	
2026	We Will Rise Again (edited with Karen Lord & Malka Older)	Locus Award	Anthology	Won	
2026	We Will Rise Again (edited with Karen Lord & Malka Older)	Ignyte Awards	Anthology/Collection	Won	

== Bibliography ==
Newitz's work has been published in Popular Science, Wired, Salon.com, New Scientist, Metro Silicon Valley, the San Francisco Bay Guardian, and at AlterNet. In addition to these print and online periodicals, they have published the following short stories and books:

=== Novels ===
- Autonomous (Tor Books, September 2017)
- The Future of Another Timeline (Tor Books, 2019)
- The Terraformers (Tor Books, 2023)
- Automatic Noodle (Tordotcom, 2025)
- A Wall Is Also A Road (Tor Books, 2026)

=== Short stories ===
- "The Great Oxygen Race", Hilobrow magazine, 2010
- "The Gravity Fetishist", Flurb magazine, 2010
- "Twilight of the Eco-Terrorist", Apex Magazine, 2011
- "Unclaimed", Shimmer Magazine, issue 18, 2014
- "Drones Don't Kill People", Lightspeed Magazine, issue 54, 2014
- "All Natural Organic Microbes", MIT's Twelve Tomorrows, 2016
- "Birth of the Ant Rights Movement", Ars Technica UK, 2016
- "The Blue Fairy's Manifesto", Robots vs. Fairies, ed. by Dominik Parisien and Navah Wolfe, 2018
- "When Robot and Crow Saved East St. Louis", Slate, 2018
- "Old Media", Tor.com, 2019
- "The Translator", Made to Order, ed. Jonathan Strahan, 2020
- "I'm with MUNI - How Can I Help?" San Francisco Chronicle, 2020
- "#Selfcare", Tor.com, 2021
- "The Almond Pirates", Anthropocene Magazine, 2022
- "A Hole in the Light", Sunday Morning Transport, 2022
- "Unhearable Music" Rolling Stone, 2023
- "The Best-Ever Cosplay of Whistle and Midnight", Uncanny Magazine, 2024

=== Non-fiction books ===
- White Trash: Race and Class in America. Routledge Press. 1997. ISBN 978-1135204495. Co-edited, with Matt Wray
- The Bad Subjects Anthology. New York University Press. 1998. ISBN 978-0814757925.
- Pretend We're Dead: Capitalist Monsters in American Pop Culture. Duke University Press. 2006. ISBN 978-0822337454.
- She's Such a Geek: Women Write About Science, Technology, and Other Nerdy Stuff. Seal Press. 2006. ISBN 978-1580051903. Co-edited with Charlie Anders.
- Scatter, Adapt, and Remember: How Humans Will Survive a Mass Extinction. Doubleday. 2013. ISBN 978-0385535922.
- Four Lost Cities: A Secret History of the Urban Age. Norton. 2021. ISBN 978-0393652673.
- Stories Are Weapons: Psychological Warfare and the American Mind. W.W. Norton. 2024. ISBN 978-0393881516. OCLC 1398568649.
