= Ninth Step Station =

Science-fiction audio series

- Official cover for season 1 of Ninth Step Station
- Author: Malka Older, Curtis C. Chen, Jacqueline Koyanagi, and Fran Wilde
- Audio read by: Emily Woo Zeller
- Genre: Cyberpunk
- Set in: Tokyo, 2030s
- Publisher: Serial Box
- Publication date: 13 March 2019
- Media type: Ebook; Audio drama
- Pages: 501 (Kindle Edition)
- Website: https://www.serialbox.com/serials/ninth-step-station

Ninth Step Station is a cyberpunk buddy cop crime drama series published by Serial Box. Its authors include Malka Older, Fran Wilde, Jacqueline Koyanagi, and Curtis C. Chen. The plot focuses on an American lieutenant who is sent to work with the Tokyo Police Force after a war divides Tokyo between Chinese and American control. Emma Higashi (the American officer) works with Miyako Koreda (a Japanese investigator) to solve crimes throughout the city. The first season was released in March 2019, and the production has been renewed for a second season.

== Plot summary ==
After China invades Japan, Tokyo is divided between American and Chinese control. A fragile balance of power develops. Emma Higashi, an American Peacekeeper, is assigned to work with Miyako Koreda of the Tokyo Police in an effort to warm international relations. Emma assists the Tokyo police department in investigating crimes. Though they are initially incompatible, Emma and Miyako develop a friendship.

Throughout the first season, tensions arise between organized crime syndicates, the Chinese government, American peacekeeping forces, the Japanese government, and Japanese Resistance fighters opposed to foreign occupation. These groups fight for control of a divided Tokyo, leaving Emma and Miyako caught in the crossfire. As the fragile political system deteriorates, Emma and Miyako must work together to prevent international incidents. Eventually, high-ranking politicians are assassinated and China invades Tokyo's buffer zones in a bid for more power, sparking an outright war.

== Reception ==
The series received praise for the realism and political complexity of the setting, comparing Tokyo's presentation with the division of East and West Berlin during the Cold War. The use of drone technology, body modification, and advanced forensic technology were also praised for their present-day social relevance.

The series was also praised for its high-quality sound design and narration. Some reviewers believed that the overarching narrative was compelling but criticized the simplicity of the individual criminal cases. Other reviews highlighted the complex issues explored in the series, including misogyny, colonialism, and racism.

== List of Episodes ==
No.	Title	Written by
1	"The Faceless Body"	Malka Older
Emma Higashi, an American Peacekeeper, is assigned to work with Miyako Koreda of the Tokyo Police in an effort to warm international relations. They investigate a mutilated body discovered in a subway station. Separately, Emma's boss (Charles Yardley) instructs her to search for a missing shipment of guns stolen by gang members wielding katanas.
2	"The Bodiless Arm"	Fran Wilde
A severed arm is discovered, leading Emma and Miyako to investigate Tokyo's underground culture of extreme body modification.
3	"The Fallen Executive"	Curtis C. Chen
A powerful executive is discovered dead at the foot of a skyscraper, and the police must determine if his death was a homicide or suicide.
4	"The Blackout Killer"	Jacqueline Koyanagi
A serial killer begins targeting citizens during the city's frequent blackouts; Emma and Miyako investigate.
5	"The Deadly Defection"	Malka Older
A man claims to have defected from Chinese-held Tokyo, but is he who he claims to be?
6	"The Stolen Xiǎohái"	Curtis C. Chen
When the daughter of a high-ranking Chinese politician goes missing during a protest, political pressure mounts against the Tokyo police department.
7	"The Loud Politician"	Fran Wilde
A local politician is assassinated. Miyako and Emma investigate her death amid the larger backdrop of international politics.
8	"The Clawed Limb"	Jacqueline Koyanagi
A citizen claims that his artificial arm acted on its own to commit an assault. Soon, similar reports of hacked body modifications flood the city.
9	"The Assassin's Nest"	Curtis C. Chen & Fran Wilde
Higashi's former military commander is assassinated, and Miyako's girlfriend is implicated in the crime.
10	"The Foreign Mischief"	Malka Older
Hardline Tokyo politicians attack their compatriots on the floor of the Diet as Chinese forces invade Tokyo. Emma and Miyako must decide between their competing loyalties.
