= Autonomous (novel) =

2017 science fiction novel by Annalee Newitz

- Cover of the US hardcover edition
- Author: Annalee Newitz
- Language: English
- Genre: Science fiction
- Publisher: Tor Books
- Publication date: September 19, 2017
- Publication place: United States
- Pages: 301 (hardcover, first edition)
- Awards: Lambda Literary Award for Science Fiction, Fantasy and Horror
- ISBN: 978-0-7653-9207-7 (hardcover)

Autonomous is a 2017 science fiction novel by Annalee Newitz. It is Newitz's debut novel and was published by Tor Books on September 19, 2017. Set in a near future Earth, the book describes a world where both humans and intelligent robots can be owned as property. The events of the novel follow Jack, a "drug pirate" who manufactures illegal versions of patented drugs, and Paladin, a combat robot who is owned by the law enforcement agency searching for Jack after one of the drugs she reverse-engineered turns out to have dangerous side effects.

Autonomous received generally positive reviews from critics. Critics in particular found the novel's coverage of intellectual property compelling and connected the book's fiction to Newitz's prior work in journalism covering science and technology. It won the 2018 Lambda Literary Award for Science Fiction, Fantasy and Horror and was nominated for several other awards, including the Nebula Award for Best Novel.

== Plot ==
In 2144, Jack Chen is a chemist who reverse engineers patented pharmaceuticals to manufacture generic versions which she sells on the black market. She lives on a submarine in the Arctic Sea, outside of the Free Trade Zone, an economic union which covers the majority of North America. Jack steals an experimental drug called Zacuity, a "productivity enhancer" which causes the user to experience a pleasurable sensation while working. Jack discovers that the drug has addictive properties intentionally engineered by Zaxy, the corporation that created it. After several hospitalizations and deaths are connected to black market Zacuity, Jack finds herself on the run from legal authorities. She is joined by Threezed, an escaped indentured human.

Paladin is a newly activated combat robot owned by the International Property Coalition, or IPC, an international law enforcement organization that handles patent infringement. They (Note: The book uses he/him pronouns to refer to Paladin initially and later switches to she/her pronouns, based on Eliasz's perception of them. For consistency, this article uses they/them pronouns for Paladin.) are assigned to handle the Zacuity case alongside Eliasz, a human agent who enjoys the violent aspects of his work. Paladin is indentured to Eliasz and incapable of acting autonomously. While at a shooting range with Paladin, Eliasz becomes aroused. Eliasz berates Paladin using homophobic slurs after they question him about it, as he perceives Paladin as male and is ashamed by his arousal.

Flashbacks reveal that 30 years ago Jack was in a relationship with Krish Patel, a fellow bioengineer and anti-patent activist, but they had a falling out which led to Jack's turn to piracy. In the present, Jack and Threezed head to Krish's lab in Saskatoon. They pass through Yellowknife, where they meet Med, an autonomous robot who has been independently researching the Zacuity cases. Med joins Jack and Threezed at Krish's lab, where they develop a drug called RetCon intended to be a counteractive to the addictive properties of Zacuity. After publishing RetCon for public use, Med and Threezed find out that it cures Zacuity addiction but people who were addicted for too long become somehow averse to working.

Meanwhile, Eliasz is drugged while undercover at a party in Casablanca, and Eliasz and Paladin have sex. Paladin tells Eliasz that their brain came from a female soldier, and Eliasz begins to refer to Paladin as female. Eliasz travels to Las Vegas and sends Paladin to Vancouver. In order to go undercover in Vancouver's community of autonomous bots, Paladin is given a temporary "autonomy key". While autonomous, Paladin examines their own programming and learns that they are programmed to feel a strong sense of attachment to Eliasz.

Eliasz arrives in Vancouver and reconnects with Paladin. Eliasz and Paladin find Krish's lab and confront Krish and Med. Eliasz tortures Krish and kills him after learning Jack's location in Moose Jaw. Jack sets a trap and manages to hold Paladin and Eliasz off long enough for Med and Threezed to arrive. Paladin is gravely wounded in the ensuing fight, and Eliasz has the opportunity to shoot Jack but chooses instead to go back for Paladin.

Jack is officially presumed dead after the firefight. Med publishes her research into Retcon and the drug becomes a widespread treatment for Zacuity addicts. Zaxy conducts a successful PR campaign denying the claims that the black market drug was the same as Zacuity. Paladin recovers from their damage with their autonomy intact but is no longer recognized by the IPC, and Eliasz and Paladin depart together for Mars.

== Background, style, and themes ==
Newitz has a background in journalism. They founded io9, a science fiction and futurism blog that was part of Gawker Media, in 2008 and remained editor of the publication until they left in 2015. Newitz's non-fiction coverage at io9 included stories that focused on themes they would later incorporate into Autonomous, such as medical technology and the changing landscape of intellectual property.

Though some events take place in Las Vegas and Casablanca, the majority of the events of the novel are set in present-day Canada. Newitz was raised in California but had family members in Canada and spent holidays in Saskatchewan. According to Newitz, they chose Saskatchewan as the setting for the novel in part because they felt that it was "the kind of place that often gets forgotten" in favor of major metropolitan cities in depictions of the future. They noted the irony that many science-fiction television programs are filmed in Vancouver but depicted as taking place in the United States or other countries.

Autonomous is set in a 22nd century future Earth which has broadly embraced free market economics on a global scale. The world governments depicted are economic unions which cooperate to enforce the property rights of privately owned companies. In the book, medicine has advanced to the point where complex drug interventions are capable of solving wide varieties of problems beyond illness, including reversing the effects of aging and improving physical fitness. Meanwhile, the healthcare system shown is a fee-for-service system where access to these drugs is restricted to the wealthy. Many of the better jobs in the society require the drugs, leading to a system of class discrimination. In addition, both humans and robots are allowed to be owned as property in the world depicted, where this ownership is referred to as indenture.

The themes of Autonomous are primarily explored through the actions and thoughts of individual characters. The character of Paladin, a newly activated robot who is self-aware but unable to act autonomously, is used to explore the idea of freedom and its relationship to consent. Paladin is designed for combat and does not question being used as a weapon. When their owner Eliasz becomes attracted to them, they begin to question human sexuality, gender, and the degree to which their own feelings for Eliasz are something they have freely chosen. The relationship between Paladin and Eliasz is contrasted to the relationship between Jack, a human who has lived much of her life outside of the system of government and standard social structures, and Threezed, who was raised in slavery. Both of these relationships also deal with issues of ambiguous sexual consent.

The book also has noteworthy depictions of LGBT characters and relationships. Many of the characters in the book do not have a gender-based view of sexual attraction, including Jack, who is depicted in relationships with characters of multiple genders. Paladin states that they do not share the human concept of gender and switches from using male to female pronouns halfway through the book at the urging of Eliasz, who struggles with internalized homophobia.

== Reception ==
Autonomous received generally positive reviews, with Newitz's background in journalism and the book's approach to covering intellectual property and medicine receiving particular attention. Writing for The Verge, Adi Robertson compared the book to Newitz's non-fiction work and said the book "draws bold and interesting connections between the ownership of people and information". In a review for Den of Geek, Kayti Burt praised the complexity of the book's worldbuilding and described the book as "[working] best when these perceived dichotomies collapse and work together to become something more complicated, messy, and honest". In a review for NPR, Amal El-Mohtar praised the book for "startling insights [and] delicately turned prose" as well as "compelling character arcs", but criticized the book's technical world building and said that "a lot of the intellectual property aspects of the world don't quite stand up to scrutiny". Niall Harrison, writing for Strange Horizons, also found issues with the world-building and found details of the depiction of society to be inconsistent in a way that impacted the plot, writing "the symptom and the system need to feel crushingly inescapable; and they don't always".

The writing style and characters of Autonomous were widely praised. Robertson wrote that "Newitz’s pared-down style makes Autonomous a lean thriller that pairs a fast-moving cat-and-mouse game with an impassioned ethical argument". Nisi Shawl of The Seattle Times wrote that Newitz was "both extremely funny and unfussily violent" and generally praised the characters with the exception of Eliasz, who she described as an "affectless cipher". Both Shawl and Burt praised the interactions between non-human characters in the book, with Burt describing them as "some of the best scenes in this book". Kirkus described the book as "a strong and cerebral start if perhaps a little too open-ended".

Reviewers were mixed on the book's handling of sexuality. In a review for Tor.com, Lee Mandelo praised the treatment of Paladin's gender and wrote that "for several nonbinary readers, I suspect it will strike a familiar chord". Mandelo also described the sexual power dynamics as "consistently engaging", but Shawl found that Eliasz and Paladin's relationship in particular had close parallels to the power dynamics of slavery in the United States which detracted from the novel.

=== Awards and honors ===
Autonomous won the 2018 Lambda Literary Award for Science Fiction, Fantasy and Horror, an annual award given to works which explore LGBTQ topics and themes. The award was presented on June 4, 2018. Autonomous was nominated for several other literary awards, including the 2017 Nebula Award for Best Novel.

Awards for Autonomous
Date Presented	Award	Year	Result	Ref.
May 19, 2018	Nebula Award for Best Novel	2017	Nominated	
June 4, 2018	Lambda Literary Award for Science Fiction, Fantasy and Horror	2018	Won	
June 22–24, 2018	Locus Award for Best First Novel	2018	Nominated	
June 22, 2018	John W. Campbell Memorial Award for Best Science Fiction Novel	2018	Nominated	
