= The Future of Another Timeline =

2019 novel by Annalee Newitz

- Author: Annalee Newitz
- Genre: Science fiction, Time travel
- Publisher: Tor Books
- Publication date: September 24, 2019
- Publication place: United States

The Future of Another Timeline is a 2019 science fiction novel by Annalee Newitz. The feminist time-travel adventure follows Tess, a professional time traveler, geoscientist, and secretly a member of the Daughters of Harriet (Tubman), who are working to make the future better for women.

== Synopsis ==
In 1992, after a confrontation at a riot grrrl concert, 17-year-old Beth finds herself in a car with her friend's abusive boyfriend dead in the back seat and agrees to help her friends hide the body. The event sets the young women on a path of escalating violence and vengeance as they realize how many other young women in the world need protecting as well.

In 2022, Tess is a geologist who is one of a team of time-traveling scholars, and she transports to key moments in history to change the timeline and create a better future. But rewriting the timeline isn’t as simple as it may seem. As Tess observes, “change is never linear and obvious. Often progress only becomes detectable when it inspires a desperate backlash”. Tess and Beth’s stories intertwine as war breaks out across the timeline—an incel-like anti-women group of men from the future is threatening to destroy time travel and leave only a small group with the power to shape the past, present, and future, in which women have been genetically engineered into subservience. This group is dedicated to stopping Tess and her colleagues at any cost.

Tess travels backwards in time to the 1893 Chicago World's Fair, where she and her cohort take on nineteenth-century moralist and anti-family-planning crusader Anthony Comstock, the inspiration for the futuristic cabal. Throughout, Tess jumps back and forth to her present and to Beth's 1990's, experiencing different futures that develop along the way. For example, in all the timelines, Beth has an abortion after getting pregnant by Hamid. But in the original timeline, in which abortion is illegal, the experience is traumatic and humiliating, whereas in the timeline edited by Tess and her friends, it is a respectful and professional procedure, and the lack of trauma enables Beth to reconnect with Hamid. This leads to her telling him about her father's abusive behavior, and his support gives her the courage to turn to the authorities and break away from her parents.

== Themes ==
The time travelers and the Daughters of Harriet are concerned with questions central to the idea of time travel: How best to achieve change? What causes change to begin with? Exactly whose history gets suppressed and why, and whose ends up getting privileged? One time traveler from the future, Morehshin, believes in cutting the past to the core - simply kill Comstock and his followers to preserve the rights of women. However, beyond any moral objections to this path, the philosophical consideration arises with the theory that ridding the world of one bad influencer might simply clear the way for another; that the social forces at play will continue in the same direction regardless of the player.

One of the leaders of the Daughters, Anita, objects to what she sees as buying into the Great man theory, which posits that great historical change is caused by the actions of specific actors (generally privileged white men). She believes in change from the grassroots, due to activism, also known as the Collective action theory. Her beliefs are supported by her own actions as a time traveler—she provided aid to the rebelling slaves in Haiti and returned to a world less racist than the one she originally came from.

The experience of the characters does not, however, completely negate the use of violence, as in the case of the many predatory men in the party scene of the 1990s, where everyone knew what they were doing but never intervened. The novel does not negatively judge a response of violence by those victimized by violence that is normalized and even valorized.

== Reception ==
The critics received Another Timeline with acclaim, citing in particular its political relevance.

The NPR review of Another Timeline praises how Newitz constructed and handled a complex plot of a type that often falls into tropes and continued: "Another Timeline is a revolutionary novel in that it is about revolutions. Big ones and little ones, violent ones and psychological ones. It is, on the one hand, a starkly feminist piece of contemporary science fiction about the dangers of accessible time travel, the lengths some people will go to in order to enforce their worldview and what it takes to resist. On the other, it is a small, personal story".

Kirkus Reviews calls Another Timeline "An ambitious adventure that keeps the surprises coming", noting the careful character development and the fast-paced plot, which is finally tied together with "breathtaking finesse". In his Chicago Tribune review, Gary K. Wolfe finds Newitz's rules of time travel unnecessarily complex, but writes that "Newitz more than makes up for it with [their] vivid portrait of the raucous South Side of Chicago during the World’s Fair — incidentally revealing the little-known important roles that women played in that spectacle — and especially with [their] portrait of the young punk-wannabe Beth trying to negotiate her way through a troubled adolescence in the 1990s".

Brendan Buck raved, "Newitz’s good fight is unabashedly a feminist one, with an emphasis on racial and gender intersectionality... The Future of Another Timeline might be the most political novel in a year that drops a Handmaid’s Tale sequel The Testaments, but it certainly disproves that issue-based science fiction needs to be less fun than supposedly 'apolitical' adventures. It has a high quantity of fist pumping moments... It’s so good in so many ways that I doubt we live in a timeline where it’s snubbed for a Hugo."

Los Angeles Times reviewer Cory Doctorow also gave Another Timeline a positive review: "The premise (...) is fairly madcap — a time-traveling Wikipedia-style edit war between Men’s Rights Advocates and Social Justice Warriors. While there’s plenty of light, fast-moving action here, the story also has a pulsing, claustrophobic, dystopian heart... Newitz’s Comstockers are far too real and present to be mere satire. That’s because so much of their ideology is lifted verbatim from men’s rights message boards, murderous incel cults and 'Dark Enlightenment' self-parody... The upshot is a book full of heart, consequences, stakes, action and surprises. Newitz blends exquisitely rendered historical research with a complex science fiction, the time-travel premise whose internal logic is well-thought-through, throwing up all kind of hard puzzles for their characters to solve... This is a hell of a book from start to finish and could not be more timely."

Jane Huang in Paste: "The Future of Another Timeline boasts an unabashedly queer feminist agenda. With their thorough research and incorporation of key historical figures and events, Newitz crafts a tale that illuminates just how fragile women’s rights are... Feminist readers will readily join Tess on her mission, but readers who aren’t already on board may feel further alienated. The urgency of women’s issues in our own time, however, necessitates this heavy-handedness... Although it bears flaws in its character development, The Future of Another Timeline is a relevant social commentary disguised as a cautionary tale."

== Awards ==
- Finalist for Locus Award for Best Science Fiction Novel (2020)
- Nominee for Goodreads Choice Award for Science Fiction (2019)
- Winner Sidewise Award for Alternate History 2019
