= The Imposition of Unnecessary Obstacles =

2024 novella by Malka Older

- Author: Malka Older
- Language: English
- Series: The Mossa and Pleiti Investigations
- Release number: 2
- Genre: Science fiction; mystery novel
- Set in: Jupiter
- Published: 13 Feb 2024
- Publisher: Tor Books
- Publication place: United States
- Pages: 224
- ISBN: 9781250906793
- Preceded by: The Mimicking of Known Successes
- Followed by: The Potency of Ungovernable Impulses

The Imposition of Unnecessary Obstacles is a 2024 science fiction mystery novella by Malka Older. It is the sequel to 2023's The Mimicking of Known Successes. It follows Mossa and Pleiti as they investigate several disappearances from Valdegeld University.

== Plot ==
Mossa investigates the disappearance of Stravan, a student at Valdegeld University. Pleiti agrees to assist her. Mossa discovers that seventeen students, scholars, and employees have gone missing from Valdegeld University in previous months. She discovers that Stravan grew up near another missing student, Elemaya. Both students were originally from Io. Mossa, also an immigrant from Io, plans a trip to the moon colony to investigate.

On Io, Pleiti and Mossa learn that Elemaya was a wealthy member of a famous family, while Stravan came from a more modest background. Back on Giant, Pleiti visits the Cat Club. The day before his disappearance, Stravan and Elemaya had lunch together at the club’s restaurant. Pleiti discovers Stravan’s body on the club’s roof. As the investigation progresses, Pleiti is almost killed by a falling building panel.

Despite her disapproval of his actions, Pleiti is forced to attend the memorial for Rector Spandal, who died after the events of the first book. She becomes progressively more embroiled in the University's politics.

Mossa speculates that some of the missing people from Valdegeld have settled an empty platform. She and Pleiti circumnavigate Giant, where they find a newly constructed platform where none should be. The inhabitants call this platform “Little Earth” and pursue an ascetic life, mostly independent of the rest of Giant’s population. They interview Elemaya, who is among the settlers on Little Earth. She had been trying to convince Stravan to join their community on the day of his death, but he had not made a final decision.

On the journey back, Mossa and Pleiti deduce that Stravan was killed after blackmailing the Bursar of Valdegeld’s Speculative Department. The Bursar was also behind the attack on Pleiti’s life. Upon returning to Valdegeld, Mossa is attacked by the Bursar. He is captured and arrested. Mossa and Pleiti discuss the case and their future together.

== Major themes ==
Jeremy Brett of SFRA Review wrote that the novel explores the theme of "disconnection." Seventeen students and workers go missing; the disappearances are not investigated for months because Giant's civilization is very loosely-knit. Brett also writes about the divisions between different social classes, such as the descendants of wealthy settlers on Io and the general population of Giant. Brett stated that "These kinds of familial and class prejudices form one variation of the kinds of “unnecessary obstacles” that we humans are always imposing among and between us, obstacles that constrain our ability to form communities and relationships and institutions and that can throw off a settlement’s unsteady balance." This is further related to the libertarian ideals of the commune platform. Brett stated that "We are, or should be anyway, long past the romantic literary trend of the individualist conquerors and pioneers of space; we now reside in an age in which we must, if we are to survive as a species and a planet, come together in a greater cooperative spirit and sense of common humanity and truly recognize the worth of one another."

Safia H. Senhaji of Strange Horizons also commented on the way in which the book relates to modern politics in the United States. She stated that "From characters’ comments about how, back on Earth, they would need to pay for basic and necessary things such as transit, to the unchecked capitalistic greed that led to the ecological collapse of Earth centuries ago ... and of course to the critical interrogation of essentially Libertarian principles that form the basis of the plot, this novella is speaking to modern readers directly." This review noted that the novel speaks to the issue of class divide and how to bridge it.

== Style ==
Alex Brown of Reactor commented on the way in which Older plays with language in the novel. The citizens of Giant speak English and borrow words from multiple other languages. Brown cites examples of characters using vocabulary from French, Japanese, and Spanish in the book, which gives the story a "vibrant, exciting feel."

== Reception and awards ==
Alex Brown of Reactor praised the lighthearted feel of the novel. Brown stated "[the book] is like a warm cup of tea. It’s like sitting in a patch of sunshine after a week of rain. It’s a picnic at the park in the summer and a stroll through fallen leaves in the fall. I recommend this series to literally everyone..." Safia H. Senhaji of Strange Horizons concluded that the book "provides plenty of heart-stopping adventures and moments, clever investigative work, and a heartfelt romance. I found it a delightful novella, with a wonderful mix of elements that align beautifully." Marlene Harris of Library Journal wrote that fans of the first book "will be thrilled to have Mossa and Pleiti back on the case as it takes its surprisingly cozy mystery into this sci-fi setting and grounds it in an on-the-nose portrayal of academic politics in all of its delicious viciousness."

Colleen Mondor of Locus praised the writing, stating that "Older has her Holmesian rhythms nailed down and the world-building gets better and better..." Mondor felt that the mystery plot was the weakest element of the novel, stating that "the actual reason behind the crime is relatively banal and the villain remains somewhat forgettable. They hardly appear on the page at all and the final confrontation seems a bit forced because of that; this is simply not a person the reader has much interest in, so their momentary boldness followed by quick capture is more of a footnote to all the observing and chatting that has filled the previous pages." Despite this criticism, Mondor still felt that the work was a success, writing that many readers would care more about Mossa's and Pleiti's relationship than the mystery elements.

The novel was a finalist for the 2025 Locus Award for Best Science Fiction Novel.
