= When Robot and Crow Saved East St. Louis =

"When Robot and Crow Saved East St. Louis" is a 2018 science fiction short story by Annalee Newitz. It was first published in Slate.

== Synopsis ==
Robot is an autonomous CDC drone, monitoring the Metro East population for viral outbreaks. When the CDC's budget is cut, and Robot is abandoned, it continues its mission with the aid of the city's crows.

== Reception ==
"When Robot and Crow Saved East St. Louis" won the 2019 Theodore Sturgeon Award. Kirkus Reviews considered it "charming", and noted that it provides "both humor and hope", while The Verge called it "great".

Janelle Shane commended Robot as "so charming that I just want to pat its little robot head", but noted that Robot's abilities to transcend the limitations in its training data and learn new languages make it an artificial general intelligence — "as magical as a talking mirror from a fairy tale", and "improbably successful" at its tasks.

== Origins ==
Newitz has stated that the story was inspired in part by the presence of bird imagery at the Cahokia archaeological site, and has emphasized that Robot's programmed emotional responses have made it the equivalent of a victim of abuse.
