= This Is How You Lose the Time War =

2019 novel by Amal el-Mohtar and Max Gladstone

- Author: Amal El-Mohtar and Max Gladstone
- Audio read by: Cynthia Farrell and Emily Woo Zeller
- Language: English
- Genre: Science fiction
- Publisher: Saga Press
- Pages: 208
- ISBN: 9781534431003
- OCLC: 1033576552

This Is How You Lose the Time War is a 2019 science fiction fantasy LGBT epistolary novel by Amal El-Mohtar and Max Gladstone. It follows two enemy agents who travel back and forth through time to alter history on behalf of their warring empires, whose timelines are mutually exclusive. It was first published by Simon & Schuster. It won the 2019 BSFA Award for Best Shorter Fiction, 2019 Nebula Award for Best Novella, 2020 Locus Award for Best Novella, 2020 Hugo Award for Best Novella, and 2020 Ignyte Award for Best Novella.

== Plot ==
Agents Red and Blue travel back and forth through time, altering the history of multiple universes on behalf of their warring empires, whose timelines are mutually exclusive. In secret, the two begin leaving each other messages – initially taunting, but gradually developing into flirtation, and then love. When Red's commanding officer detects the interaction between Red and Blue, she forces Red to send Blue a message that will poison her when read. Even though Red warns Blue of the danger, she reads the message and succumbs to the poison anyway, fearing Red’s treason will be discovered if she does not.

Some time later, Red, now listless and distraught, finds another message hinting that Blue faked her own death. Red returns to each point in their correspondence and collects traces of Blue’s DNA from her letters, allowing her to sneak into Blue's empire and give her immunity to the poison during childhood, an episode related in an earlier letter. This incident is discovered and Red is arrested by her own empire; the day before her scheduled execution, Red receives a final letter from Blue indicating that she is breaking her out of prison and inviting her to fight together against both their empires.

== Development ==
Red's letters were written entirely by Gladstone, and Blue's by El-Mohtar. Although they wrote a general outline beforehand, "the reactions of each character were developed with a genuine element of surprise on receiving each letter, and the scenes accompanying [the letters] were written using that emotional response".

== Reception ==
Publishers Weekly called This Is How You Lose the Time War "exquisitely crafted" and "dazzling", with "increasingly intricate wordplay", and stated that it "warrants multiple readings". NPR's Jason Sheehan compared it to the film The Lake House (if one "strapped [The Lake House] up in body armor, covered it with razors, dipped it in poison and set it loose to murder and burn its way across worlds and centuries"), and said that the book makes a virtue of what he felt to be the characteristic weaknesses of both the time travel genre and the epistolary format.

Cheryl Morgan argued that its central message—"soldiers on either side of a war often have far more in common with each other than they do with the people who sit safely at home and issue orders"—is one "that the world needs to hear". Tor.com's Lee Mandelo found in the book "a poetic internal structure", prose that was "sharp, almost crisp" rather than "lush", and a "focus [which] remains on the personal as opposed to the global"; Mandelo also observed that it "has an argument to make—several, actually—about conflict, love, and resistance", and treats the time war as "an object lesson, a conceit, the unending and reason-less conflict that consumes generations, centuries, now and forever."

Den of Geek's Natalie Zutter praised the novel's approach to gender identity: Red and Blue "both use she/her pronouns, but neither fits the heteronormative mold of femininity"; each of them "performs gender in a dozen different ways", such that "[t]he more that Blue and Red appear in different forms, the less their gender actually matters."

At Strange Horizons, Adri Joy lauded the novel as "an absolute emotional masterpiece, sending readers on a gut-wrenching feelings rollercoaster of the highest calibre." She noted that "the Time War itself [...] is largely incomprehensible beyond its most basic points", but specified that "every little aside of... description works to set the scene in the most effective possible way", including the "impermanence" of the messages delivered between Red and Blue.

Black Gate found it to be neither "a riddle to parse" nor "a tangled, hard sci-fi puzzle-box of time travel to unravel", with its final revelation being "fairly obvious from the first chapter", but emphasized that the revelation in question was nonetheless "quite emotionally fulfilling", ultimately concluding that "it's fun to watch goddesses fall in love [...] and Blue and Red feel very much human."

=== Awards ===
This Is How You Lose the Time War received critical acclaim, winning several major speculative fiction awards and receiving nominations for others.

Year	Award	Category	Result	Ref
2019	BSFA Award	Shorter Fiction	Won	
2019	Kitschies	Novel	Shortlisted	
2019	Los Angeles Times Book Prize	Ray Bradbury Prize (Science fiction, fantasy, and speculative fiction)	Finalist	
2019	Nebula Award	Novella	Won	
2019	Shirley Jackson Award	Novella	Nominated	
2020	Aurora Award	Short Fiction	Won	
2020	Hugo Award	Novella	Won	
2020	Ignyte Award	Novella	Won	
2020	Locus Award	Novella	Won	
2020	Theodore Sturgeon Memorial Award	—	Second Place	

=== Social media ===
bigolas dickolas woIfwood
(@maskofbun)
tweeted:

read this. DO NOT look up anything about it. just read it. it's only like 200 pages u can download it on audible it's only like four hours. do it right now i'm very extremely serious.

May 7, 2023

In May 2023, three years after its release, This Is How You Lose the Time War received an unexpected boost in popularity, ascending Amazon's bestseller rankings to number three overall and number one in science fiction. This was because of a series of viral tweets by a fan of the manga series Trigun with the display name "bigolas dickolas wolfwood" who recommended the book to their followers. In response, El-Mohtar wrote "I do not understand what is happening but I am incomprehensibly grateful to bigolas dickolas". "Wolfwood" was subsequently nominated for the 2024 Hugo Award for Best Related Work for their tweets, but declined to appear on the ballot.

== Adaptation ==
El-Mohtar announced in 2019 that the book has been optioned for television, with scripts to be written by herself and Gladstone. She also specified that the genders of the characters "are not up for negotiation".

== Bibliography ==
Romanzi, Valentina. 2023. “Love Is a Thing with Feathers. Posthuman Metamorphoses in This Is How You Lose the Time War”. RSAJournal 34: 137-155. https://doi.org/10.13135/1592-4467/8381.
