= Automatic Noodle =

2025 novella by Annalee Newitz

Automatic Noodle is a 2025 science fiction novella by Annalee Newitz. It was first published by Tordotcom.

== Synopsis ==
In a future San Francisco, a group of independent robots — Cayenne, Hands, Sweetie, and Staybehind — open a restaurant, but are faced with review bombing.

== Reception and awards ==
Kirkus Reviews noted superficial similarities to Travis Baldree's Legends & Lattes, about an orc who opens a coffee shop, but emphasized that Newitz included "social commentary about climate change, PTSD, and [the gatekeeping roles of platforms such as] Yelp and DoorDash", and called the overall work "both heartwarming and pointed".

Strange Horizons, conversely, found that this social commentary "felt (...) somewhat clumsy" (despite the novella as a whole being a "fun and relevant look at modern online culture"), and noted that although the robots have "interesting backstories", they also "came across as too human".

Year	Award	Category	Result	Ref.
2025	Nebula Award	Novella	Finalist	
2026	Hugo Award	Novella	Finalist	
2026	Locus Award	Novella	Finalist	
