= The Potency of Ungovernable Impulses =

2025 novella by Malka Older

- Author: Malka Older
- Language: English
- Series: The Mossa and Pleiti Investigations
- Release number: 3
- Genre: Science fiction; mystery novel
- Set in: Jupiter
- Publisher: Tordotcom
- Publication date: 10 June 2025
- Pages: 256
- ISBN: 9781250396068
- Preceded by: The Imposition of Unnecessary Obstacles

The Potency of Ungovernable Impulses is a 2025 novel by Malka Older. It is her third book featuring Investigator Mossa and her partner Pleiti, following 2024's The Imposition of Unnecessary Obstacles.

== Plot ==
Pleiti is approached by Petanj, an acquaintance from her undergraduate studies. Petanj's cousin Villette has been accused of plagiarism. Petanj hopes that Pleiti's investigatory and academic expertise can help prove her cousin's innocence. Mossa is suffering from clinical depression and declines to assist, so Pleiti travels without her.

Villette has invented a new kind of atmospheric filter to replace bulky “atmoscarfs”, which protect wearers from Giant's harsh atmosphere. She plans to give away the technology for free, threatening existing industries. A gas leak occurs in Villette's lab; no one is injured, but Pleiti suspects foul play. Anonymous pamphlets continue to accuse Villette of academic dishonesty. Pleiti narrows the investigation to a few major suspects: Villette's former tutor, Professor Vertri; Villette's lazy coauthor, Hoghly; and two fellow researchers, Evna and Wojo.

At a karaoke slam, Pleiti gets into a physical altercation with Wojo. The next morning, Mossa appears at Pleiti's lodgings. Mossa has disguised herself as a porter and has been present for the entirety of the investigation thus far. Pleiti is angry with Mossa for hiding her presence, but the two reconcile.

Villette's lab is damaged by an explosion. At a sporting event, the stadium experiences a power outage. Hoghly behaves strangely throughout this incident, but Pleiti cannot prove any wrongdoing. In the darkness, an attacker tries to stab Villette. Mossa deflects the blade, but the attacker escapes. Hoghly is then kidnapped and brought to a research lab. Pleiti and her companions rescue him, but the lab is damaged in an explosion. Evna reveals herself as the perpetrator, acting out of jealousy of Villette's success. Hoghly had assisted her, but Evna double-crossed Hoghly as he became more wary of physical violence.

Villette decides to leave her university. Mossa and Pleiti discuss their future. Mossa considers a career as a private investigator.

== Reception and awards ==
Ashley Rayner of Booklist gave the novel a starred review praised the focus on Pleiti, writing that a new protagonist "is a refreshing change and gives this charming series a great new perspective." Rayner recommended the book for fans of works by Mur Lafferty and Becky Chambers. Marlene Harris of Library Journal wrote that "the further exploration of the colony’s academic scene will delight readers of dark academia" and praised the relationship between Mossa and Pleiti, recommending the book for fans of sapphic romances. Laura Hubbard of BookPage called the book "a cozy, thought-provoking mystery with just a dash of science-fiction action flair." This review compared the detective elements to classic stories involving Hercule Poirot. Like Rayner, Hubbard also compared the work to books by Becky Chambers. Alexandra Pierce of Locus praised the book's exploration of academia, feeling that Older adequately balanced the positive elements with the "caustic portrayal of its very worst aspects".

Kirkus Reviews called the book charming, entertaining, and action-packed, but criticized the premise of the novel, stating that Older "might be pushing the boundaries of implausibility too far." The review particularly criticized the existence of a society which contains murder but no significant prison system. Bill Capossere of fantasyliterature.com gave the novel three stars of a possible five, complimenting that the premise and setting but criticizing the execution of the plot. Capossere characterized the central mystery as "not particularly engaging" and further criticized the antagonist and "repetitive and often implausible". Marion Deeds concurred with Capossere's review, also giving the book three of a possible five stars. Deeds appreciated the novel's homage to The Hound of the Baskervilles while criticizing the villain, whose motive felt "implausible." The reviewer felt that the mystery was the weakest part of the story, stating that "Not all books by authors we love can be hits."
