= The Terraformers =

2023 novel by Annalee Newitz

- First edition cover
- Author: Annalee Newitz
- Language: English
- Genre: Science fiction
- Publisher: Tor
- Publication date: January 31, 2023
- Publication place: United States
- Pages: 352
- ISBN: 978-1-250-22802-4

The Terraformers is a science fiction novel by Annalee Newitz, published on January 31, 2023. Environmentalism is a major theme.

== Plot ==
60,000 years in the future, on a private terraformed planet, worker slaves of an interstellar real estate corporation, Verdance, have transformed the planet, Sask-E, from an anoxic wasteland into an oxygen-rich planet habitable by H. sapiens. Destry, a member of a team dedicated to continuing the planet's transformation, uncovers Spider, a secret underground city founded by escaped slaves who chose not to go extinct 10,000 years ago. City residents include a diverse set of people, including bots, cats, cows, mole rats, moose, beavers, and the non-oxygen-breathing H. diversus Archaeans descended from the first terraformers. Destry's team secretly helps resolve a water shortage problem by redirecting a river using an engineered lava eruption. They observe that the eruption was controlled by bot people living in the mantle. These people also chose not to go extinct and continue to maintain ribbons, artificial plate tectonic infrastructure from an early terraforming phase. Upon learning that the ribbons still exist, Verdance declares war on Spider, firing orbital lasers. Verdance employees rebel. Destry is able to force Verdance to sign a treaty, granting Spider limited sovereignty under threat of the ribbons.

700 years later, a new team composed of Spider residents (an Archaean named Sulfur and a bot) and Verdance employees (a cow and an H. sapiens) are tasked with performing an environmental survey and creating a planetary inter-city public transit plan for Verdance and the largest landowner, Emerald. They tour several settlements and observe that both Verdance and Emerald aim to keep Sask-E a private planet by hamstringing all public services in favor of private ones. In protest, the team recommends establishing a community of self-governing anti-gravity train people under Spider sovereignty as the best long-term solution for providing transport. Emerald approves the plan, ignoring the sovereignty implications. Spider bioengineers birth the first trains.

904 years later, Scrubjay, a member of the Flying Train Fleet worker co-op, befriends Moose, a homeless journalist cat, who is digging up dirt against Sask-E's monopoly landowner Emerald. Moose teaches Scrubjay about protests to make Sask-E a public planet in response to widespread gentrification problems. They help evacuate refugees evicted by lethal orbital strikes fired by Emerald to cleanse its cities of enslaved non-H. sapiens. Scrubjay and Moose uncover ancient legal documents that prove Emerald defrauded real estate customers by charging license fees for public domain H. sapiens genome sequences. They also discover that Emerald's approval of the self-governing train community also disqualifies Sask-E from private planet status in the interstellar government. Spider and the Flying Train Fleet vote not to activate the ribbons in response to the orbital strikes and to apply for recognition by the wider interstellar government as governments of a public planet.

== Development and writing ==
Newitz was inspired to write The Terraformers after thinking about how fictional stories could carry messages relating to present-day environmental crises like climate change. They divided the book into three sections separated by a period of several hundred years each, which they told The Stranger was so they could track the entire terraforming process. The terraforming process they describe within the book was heavily influenced by their own experience as a science journalist and by interviews with scientists in the field.

=== Publication history ===
The Terraformers was published on January 31, 2023, by Tor Publishing.

== Reception ==
Paul Di Filippo, writing in The Washington Post, described the book as having "enough ideas and incidents to populate half a dozen lesser science fiction books," praising Newitz's prose. A review by Mark Athitakis in the Los Angeles Times positively described the novel's optimistic message but criticized Newitz for what he viewed as cluttered prose.

A starred review in Publishers Weekly praised the book, drawing comparisons between Newitz and fellow science-fiction writers Becky Chambers and Samuel R. Delany. Booklist's Leah von Essen praised Newitz for their sense of humor and for the "pure moments of joy" sprinkled throughout the prose. Library Journal and BookPage both published positive reviews, with the former describing the book as "incredibly emotional and action-packed" and the latter commenting that Newitz was able to comment on social issues without making the reader feel "lectured, bored, or disconnected" from the narrative. The novel was nominated for the 2024 Nebula Award for Best Novel.
