= Ian Tregillis =

American author and physicist

- Born: Minnesota, United States
- Education: University of Minnesota
- Occupations: Writer, physicist
- Writing career
- Period: 2010s–present
- Genres: Science fiction, alternate history
- Website: iantregillis.com

Ian Tregillis is an American author. He is the author of the alternate history trilogy The Milkweed Triptych and a contributor to George R. R. Martin's Wild Cards series. He is an alumnus of the Clarion Workshop, and holds a Ph.D in physics.

== Bibliography ==
=== The Alchemy Wars ===
- The Mechanical (2015, ISBN 978-0316248006)
- The Rising (2015, ISBN 978-0356502335)
- The Liberation (2016, ISBN 978-0316248051)

=== The Milkweed Triptych ===
- Bitter Seeds (2010, ISBN 978-0765321503)
- The Coldest War (2012, ISBN 978-0765321510)
- Necessary Evil (2013, ISBN 978-0765321527)

=== Serial fiction ===
- The Witch Who Came in from the Cold (co-created by Max Gladstone and Lindsay Smith)
  - The Witch Who Came in from the Cold Season One (with Lindsay Smith, Max Gladstone, Cassandra Rose Clarke, and Michael Swanwick)
    - Episode 5: "The Golem" (2016)
    - Episode 7: "Radio Free Trismegistus" (forthcoming, 2016)
    - Episode 11: "King's Gambit Accepted" (forthcoming, 2016)

=== Other novels ===
- Something More Than Night (2013, Tor Books, ISBN 9780765334329)
