= The Mimicking of Known Successes =

2023 novella by Malka Older

- Author: Malka Older
- Language: English
- Series: The Mossa and Pleiti Investigations
- Release number: 1
- Genre: Science fiction; mystery novel
- Set in: Jupiter
- Publisher: Tordotcom
- Publication date: 7 Mar 2023
- Publication place: United States
- Pages: 176
- ISBN: 978-1-250-86050-7
- Followed by: The Imposition of Unnecessary Obstacles

The Mimicking of Known Successes is a 2023 science fiction mystery novella by Malka Older. It was well-received critically, becoming a finalist for the Hugo Award for Best Novella, Ignyte Award for Best Novella, Locus Award for Best Novella, and Nebula Award for Best Novella.

== Plot ==
After Earth is rendered uninhabitable, humanity now lives on Jupiter, which they call "Giant." People live on floating platforms suspended in Jupiter's upper atmosphere, which are connected by a network of railcars and protected by atmospheric shields.

Investigator Mossa is sent to investigate the disappearance of a man from a remote platform. The man, Bolien Trewl, arrived on the platform and then disappeared before any further railcars arrived. Local citizens suspect that he either jumped to his death or was pushed. Mossa learns that Trewl was affiliated with Valdegard University, a prestigious institution where Classical scholars study the history of life on Earth.

Mossa visits Valdegard University, where she enlists the help of her ex-girlfriend Pleiti in the investigation. Pleiti is a Classical scholar who hopes that her work will one day allow humanity to repair Earth's ecosystems and eventually resettle there. She anticipates that this slow-paced work will take centuries in order to ensure the highest chance of success. Mossa and Pleiti visit the Conservation Institute, informally called the "Mauzooleum", where scientists study reanimated Earth plants and animals. They learn that genetic material has recently been stolen from the Mauzooleum.

Mossa and Pleiti eventually track down Trewl, who had used a suspended railcar to escape from the platform undetected. They learn that he was collaborating with the rector of Valdegard University, who wishes to accelerate the timeline for restoring Earth's ecosystems so that he may experience life on Earth himself. The rector steals a rocket ship and flees with the stolen genetic material. Mossa and Pleiti rekindle their romance. The story closes by focusing on their renewed relationship, even as the rector's plan leaves the future of Earth uncertain.

== Style and major themes ==
=== Sherlock Holmes and C. Auguste Dupin ===
Several reviewers have compared Mossa and Pleiti to famous fictional detectives, principally Sherlock Holmes (created by Arthur Conan Doyle) and C. Auguste Dupin (created by Edgar Allan Poe). E.G. Condé wrote that Mossa is "Older's answer to Sherlock Holmes", describing the character as "a cunning, lasso-wielding badass ... whose task as an Investigator is to solve the mystery of a man’s disappearance." Alexandra Pierce wrote that "Inspector Mossa and Pleiti are Holmesian analogues in the best way: they complement each other, they work well together, and Mossa in particular shares characteristics with Sherlock – but in a not-annoying way." Alex Brown of Reactor stated that "Mossa is the emotionally distant investigative intellectual who picks up on the tiny discrepancies that will eventually break the case wide open. Pleiti is the science-leaning assistant who may not be a genius but can still figure things out."

Seamus Sullivan noted both similarities and contrasts between the characters in Older's and Poe's stories. According to Sullivan, "These narrator-companions often act as audience surrogates, observing the detective’s deductive skills from without, the better to be dazzled by the detective’s insights and then brought up to speed when the detective explains his or her reasoning." Sullivan illustrates this by quoting an example in which Mossa guesses Pleiti's thoughts, echoing a scene from the 1841 short story "The Murders in the Rue Morgue".

Sullivan further notes that this is not a simple recapitulation of Poe and Doyle:

Older isn’t simply doing a callback here, however. Where both Dupin and Holmes worked out their companion’s thoughts through elaborate chains of observations and deductions which they were all too happy to explain, Mossa’s own explanation is simpler. She has known Pleiti a long time, and has grown interested and invested enough in her ex’s emotions to make an educated guess about Pleiti’s inner monologue...

Older’s second departure from the Dupin formula is even more noteworthy: she reverses the roles a few chapters later, in a pivotal scene wherein Pleiti herself deduces Mossa’s thoughts and anticipates her next move...

A trope that started off as a deductive parlor trick for Dupin and Holmes has evolved, in Older’s hands, into an exercise with two participants, both of whom have a real emotional stake in guessing correctly.

Sullivan concludes that while Mossa is a variation on Holmes and Dupin, the character of Pleiti successfully puts a new twist on the story by behaving in a more active way throughout the plot.

=== Gaspunk and Victorian allusions ===
Condé described aesthetics of the novel as "gaspunk". The novel is set in "a noirish, neo-Victorian future flaring with gas lamps and steamy railcars; an aesthetic choice that amplifies the novella’s theme of temporal nostalgia." In the world of the novella, the atmospheric conditions of Jupiter make telecommunications extremely difficult. Therefore, Condé writes that "information is ferried by way of telegram or porters who hand-deliver messages. Rather than cast technological progress as an exponential, absolute curve towards increasing complexity, Older’s universe is one weathered by lessons of its destructive past, misadventures on Mars and elsewhere that made the seemingly unlikely Jupiter the only viable home for a humanity that exhausted its habitat." In her review, Alexandra Pierce concurred, noting that "the wind and gasses blowing through the streets evoke a sense of Victorian London streets, with smog swirling around, for all that the two are millions of miles and centuries apart, giving this a gaslamp-fantasy feel within its science fiction setting."

=== The Mimicking of Known Successess ===
Condé opens and closes his review with the following quote from the novel:

“Perhaps there’s a discipline, or trans-discipline, of flexibility and reactiveness, or a calculation of the principles involved in ecosystem survival rather than the literal mimicking of known successes.”

This is part of a monologue spoken by Mossa to Pleiti near the conclusion of the novel. In Condé's view, this statement is "the inspiration for the novella’s title but also the pronouncement of its most radical thesis: Nature was never natural. The tediously researched biomes and ecosystems that the novella’s Classicists seek to remake are just as much an artifice as the platforms and orbital rings of the Modernists’ Giant."

== Reception and awards ==
In a starred review, Publishers Weekly stated that "Older ... packs a punch in this slim volume, delivering a romantic sci-fi mystery replete with ruminations on environmentalism and the importance of adapting to change." The review praised the upbeat tone and the focus on the relationship between Pleiti and Mossa. Marlene Harris of Library Journal wrote that the novella combines "planetary resettlement SF with steampunk, mystery, climate fiction, and a touch of romance." Harris recommended the work for fans of mystery science fiction, such as The Spare Man by Mary Robinette Kowal and Drunk on All Your Strange New Words by Eddie Robson. Harris also recommended it for "anyone who cannot resist a Sherlock Holmes pastiche. E.G. Condé of Ancillary Review of Books concluded that the book is "a quiet masterpiece; an intimate character study, a tender queer romance, a satisfying mystery, and a unique take on many genre clichés in a short form. For me, its principal flaw is that it has an ending." Alex Brown of Reactor called the work "a delight in every way... I yearn for a 10-book novella series of Mossa and Pleiti’s romantic adventures."

Writing for Locus, Alexandra Pierce stated that "Reading this novella was an absolute delight; it was one of those experiences where glancing at the number of pages left just made me sad." Pierce particularly praised the characterization of the protagonists and their relationship, noting that "Theirs is a relationship that has known difficulty and heartbreak as well as joy. Older is honest about the difficulties, and about how time changes people and relationships – this is no starry-eyed vision of new love, but love that is experienced and slightly battered and very, very real. Their relationship helps elevate the novella from enjoyable to wonderful." Seamus Sullivan of Strange Horizons praised the novel for its adaptation of classic detective fiction tropes and its depiction of environmentalism.

Awards and Honors
Year	Award	Result	Ref.
2023	Nebula Award for Best Novella	Nominated	
2024	Hugo Award for Best Novella	Finalist	
2024	Ignyte Award for Outstanding Novella	Finalist	
2024	Locus Award for Best Novella	Finalist	
