= Cassandra Rose Clarke =

American author

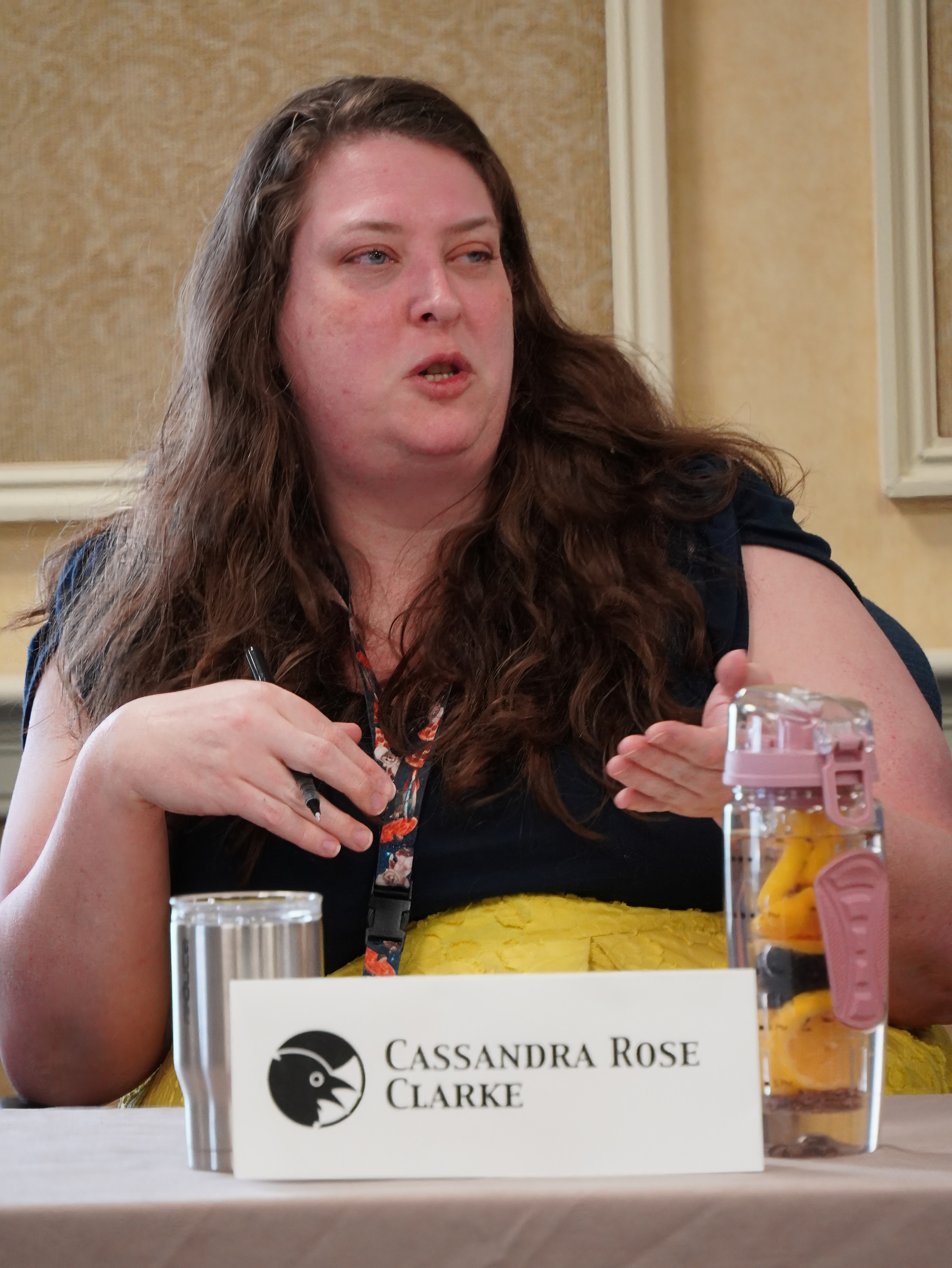
- Clarke in 2023
- Born: 1983 (age 42–43)
- Education: University of St. Thomas; University of Texas at Austin
- Occupation: Author
- Writing career
- Genre: Speculative fiction

Cassandra Rose Clarke (born 1983) is an American author who writes speculative fiction novels.

== Education ==
Clarke graduated from the University of St. Thomas in 2006 with a bachelor's degree in English. She received a master's degree in creative writing from the University of Texas at Austin in 2008. She was selected for the Clarion West Writers Workshop in 2010.

== Writing style ==
Clarke writes speculative fiction novels. Clarke's works have been praised, with particular emphasis on her skill in worldbuilding: Publishers Weekly called Our Lady of the Ice "complex and lovely" with "worldbuilding [that] will sweep readers away." The worldbuilding in The Mad Scientist's Daughter was done with "a very light and deft touch" according to Kirkus Reviews.

== Works ==
- The Mad Scientist's Daughter (2013)
- Our Lady of the Ice (2015)
- Magic of Blood and Sea (2017): A compilation of two of Clarke's earlier novels, The Assassin's Curse (2012) and The Pirate's Wish (2013)
- Magic of Wind and Mist (2017): A compilation of two of Clarke's earlier novels, The Wizard’s Promise (2014) and The Nobleman’s Revenge (previously unpublished)
- The Witch Who Came in from the Cold: A serial fiction piece coauthored with Max Gladstone, Lindsay Smith, Ian Tregillis, and Michael Swanwick.
- Star's End (2017)
- Halo: Battle Born (2019)
- Halo: Meridian Divide (2019)
- Shadows Have Offended (2021)

== Awards ==
In 2010, Clarke was a recipient of the Susan C. Petrey Clarion Scholarship Fund. In 2013, she was a finalist for the Philip K. Dick Award. She has also been nominated for the Young Adult Library Services Association Best Fiction for Young Adults Award.
