= Alexandra Rowland =

American queer fantasy writer and podcaster

- Education: Truman State University
- Occupations: Author, podcaster
- Known for: Coining hopepunk
- Writing career
- Language: English
- Genres: Fantasy, science fiction, queer fiction
- Notable works: A Taste of Gold and Iron; A Conspiracy Of Truths; Some by Virtue Fall
- Website: Official Author Website; Be the Serpent Podcast

Alexandra Rowland is a four-time Hugo Award nominated American queer fantasy writer known for the Chantiverse series and their podcast Be the Serpent.

Rowland grew up in the Bahamas, later moving to Florida and Missouri. As a child, they did not think that they would become a writer as, while they loved reading, they hated writing. They grew up around books and storytelling.

Rowland completed a degree in "world literature, mythology, and folklore" at Truman State University.

Rowland self-published their first book In the End in 2012. In 2017, they published their debut novel The Last Queens of Nuryevet with Saga Press. Their agent is Britt Siess Creative Management. In a 2022 interview, they cited Diana Wynne Jones, KJ Charles, Terry Pratchett, Douglas Adams, Neil Gaiman, Lois McMaster Bujold, and fanfiction as their major literary influences.

Rowland coined the word "hopepunk" in a July 2017 Tumblr post as the opposite to the subgenre "grimdark". According to Rowland, hopepunk is "a subgenre and a philosophy that 'says that kindness and softness doesn’t equal weakness, and that in this world of brutal cynicism and nihilism, being kind is a political act. An act of rebellion.'" The term grew in popularity and Collins English Dictionary named it one of their 2019 new words of the year. In 2026, the Collins Dictionary defines hopepunk as "a literary and artistic movement that celebrates the pursuit of positive aims in the face of adversity."

In 2018, Rowland began co-hosting the podcast Be the Serpent with Freya Marske and Jennifer Mace. The podcast would be nominated for the Hugo Award for Best Fancast four times (2019–2022). Be the Serpent aired its last episode on Apr 7, 2022. The podcast aired 102 episodes in total.

== Bibliography ==
- In the End (2012) (Self-published)
- The Russian Heir (2015) (Self-published)
- The Last Queens of Nuryevet (2017)
- Finding Faeries: Discovering Sprites, Pixies, Redcaps, and Other Fantastical Creatures in an Urban Environment (October 20, 2020)
- In Our Own Image: Radical Empathy, Trickster Gods, And the Importance of Being Irritating (2021)
- The King is Dead, Long Live the King (2022)
- The Writer's Oracle Deck & Guidebook (October 17, 2023)
- The Wisdom of Emperors (2027)

=== Chantiverse Books ===
- A Conspiracy of Truths (2018), The Tales of the Chants Series
- A Choir of Lies (2019), The Tales of the Chants Series
- Some by Virtue Fall (January 25, 2022), Seven Gods Series
- Over All the Earth (March 1, 2022), The Tales of the Chants Series
- The Lights of Ystrac's Wood (May 3, 2022), Seven Gods Series
- A Taste of Gold and Iron (August 30, 2022), The Mahisti Dynasty Series
- Tadek and the Princess (January 12, 2024), The Mahisti Dynasty Series
- Running Close to the Wind (June 2024)
- Yield Under Great Persuasion (2026)

== Awards ==
Year	Work	Award	Result
2022	Be The Serpent	Hugo Award for Best Fancast	Nominee
2021	Be The Serpent	Hugo Award for Best Fancast	Nominee
2020	Be The Serpent	Hugo Award for Best Fancast	Nominee
2019	Be The Serpent	Hugo Award for Best Fancast	Nominee
