= Malka Older =

Author, academic, and humanitarian worker

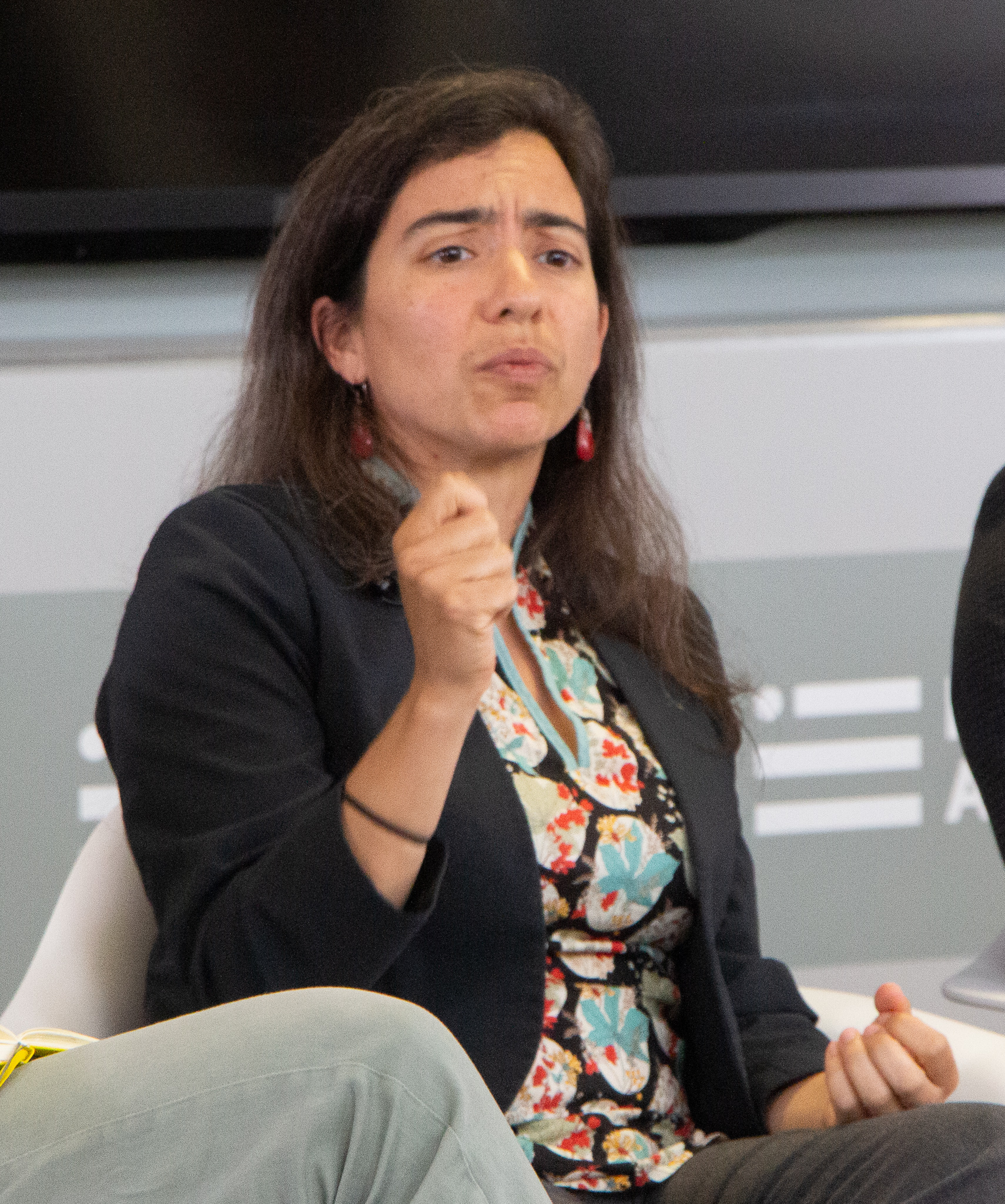
- May 2019
- Born: October 30, 1977 (age 48)
- Education: Harvard University; Johns Hopkins University; Sciences Po
- Relatives: Daniel José Older (brother)
- Writing career
- Years active: 2015–present
- Genre: Science fiction
- Notable work: Infomocracy
- Website: malkaolder.wordpress.com

Malka Ann Older (born October 30, 1977) is an American science fiction author, academic, and humanitarian aid worker, serving as the executive director of Global Voices. She was named the 2015 Senior Fellow for Technology and Risk at the Carnegie Council for Ethics in International Affairs.

Her first novel, Infomocracy (2016), is the first in the series The Centenal Cycle. The series also includes Null States (2017) and State Tectonics (2018); the latter was nominated for a Prometheus Award in 2019 while the series was nominated for a Hugo Award the same year.

== Education ==
Older attended Harvard University for her undergraduate studies in literature. She then earned a master's degree in international relations and economics from the School of Advanced International Studies (SAIS) of Johns Hopkins University. In 2019 she received a doctoral degree from the Institut d'Études Politiques de Paris (Sciences Po). Her doctoral work explored the dynamics of multi-level governance and disaster response using the cases of Hurricane Katrina and the 2011 Tōhoku tsunami in Japan.

== Career ==
For more than a decade Older worked in humanitarian aid and development on the field level as well as the organizational level. She was involved in the response to emergencies and natural disasters in Sri Lanka, Uganda, Darfur, Indonesia, Japan, and Mali. Her work there influenced her writing. Since 2021 she is a Faculty Associate at Arizona State University's School for the Future of Innovation in Society. In September 2024, Older joined Global Voices as Executive Director.

== Bibliography ==
=== Centenal Cycle Trilogy ===
- Infomocracy. Tor Books. 2016. ISBN 9780765385147.
- Null States. Tor Books. 2017. ISBN 9780765399540.
- State Tectonics. Tor Books. 2018. ISBN 9780765399472.

=== The Investigations of Mossa and Pleiti ===
- The Mimicking of Known Successes. Tor Books. 2023. ISBN 9781250860507.
- The Imposition of Unnecessary Obstacles. Tor Books. 2024. ISBN 9781250906793.
- The Potency of Ungovernable Impulses. Tor Books. 2025. ISBN 9781250396068.

=== Ebooks ===
- Tear Tracks. Tor Books. 2015. ISBN 9780765384591.
- Trade Deal (Born to the Blade, Season 1 Episode 5). Serial Box. 2018.
- Assassination (Born to the Blade, Season 1 Episode 9). Serial Box. 2018.
- Ninth Step Station. Serial Box. 2019.
- Machina. Serial Box. 2020.
- Orphan Black: The Next Chapter. Serial Box. 2019.

=== Other works ===
- ...and Other Disasters. Mason Jar Press. 2019. ISBN 9780996103787.
- "What We Believe About Our Institutions". The New York Times. 2021-05-19. ISSN 0362-4331.

== Awards and recognition ==
- Named one of Kirkus Reviews's "Best Fiction of 2016"
- One of The Washington Post's "Best Science Fiction and Fantasy of 2016"
- 2017: Finalist for the John W. Campbell Award for Best New Writer
- 2019: State Tectonics was a Prometheus Award finalist
- 2024: The Mimicking of Known Successes was a finalist for the 2024 Hugo Award for Best Novella.
- 2026: We Will Rise Again, edited with Karen Lord and Annalee Newitz, won the Locus Award for Best Anthology and the Ignyte Award for Outstanding Anthology/Collected Works.
