= Amal El-Mohtar =

Canadian poet and writer (born 1984)

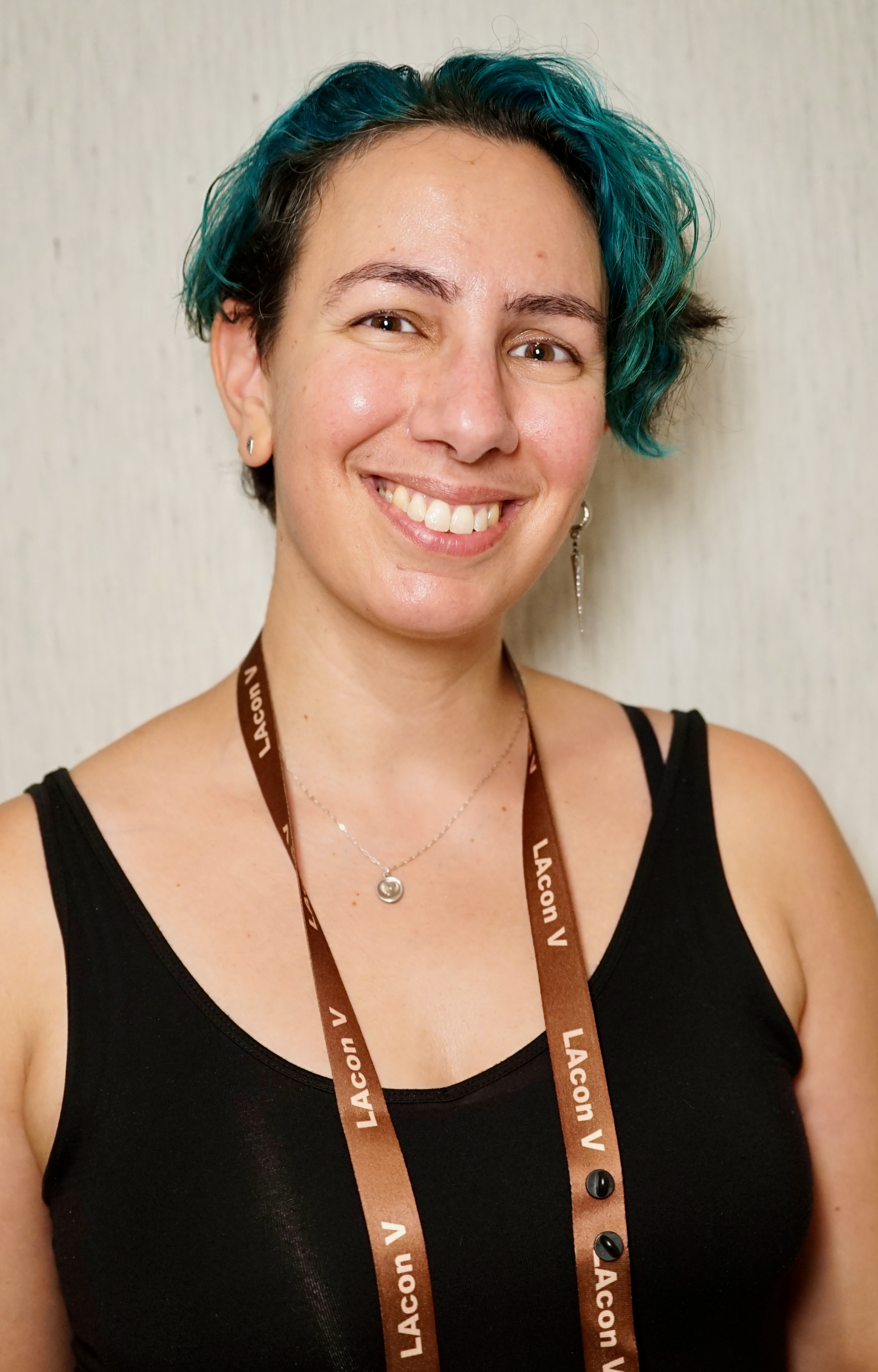
- El-Mohtar at Worldcon 2026
- Born: 13 December 1984 (age 41); Ottawa, Canada
- Occupation: Writer
- Writing career
- Language: English
- Genres: Science fiction, fantasy
- Notable work: This Is How You Lose the Time War
- Notable awards: Hugo Award for Best Short Story (2017); Hugo Award for Best Novella (2020, 2026); Nebula Award for Best Short Story (2016); Nebula Award for Best Novella (2019); Locus Award for Best Short Story (2015, 2017); Locus Award for Best Novella (2020)

Amal El-Mohtar (born 13 December 1984) is a Canadian poet and writer of speculative fiction, best known for the 2019 novella This Is How You Lose the Time War. She is the editor of Goblin Fruit and reviews science fiction and fantasy books for the New York Times Book Review.

== Early life and education ==
El-Mohtar was born in Ottawa, Ontario to a family of Lebanese descent. She said that her parents told her that she comes from a long lineage of poets. She grew up in Ottawa with the exception of two years spent in Lebanon beginning when she was six years old. It was during those two years that she first developed a love for fantasy and science fiction (she credits her Lebanese cousin with first introducing her to Doctor Who), and also wrote her first poem.

As of 2026, she is pursuing a PhD in English at Carleton University and teaches creative writing at the University of Ottawa.

== Writing career ==
El-Mohtar has published short fiction, poetry, essays and reviews, and has edited the fantastic poetry quarterly magazine Goblin Fruit since 2006.

She began reviewing science fiction and fantasy books for the New York Times Book Review in February 2018. She has worked as a creative writing instructor at Carleton University and the University of Ottawa. In 2018, she also served as a host on Brandon Sanderson's creative writing podcast Writing Excuses for Season 13.

Her 2019 novella, This Is How You Lose the Time War, co-written with Max Gladstone, won the 2019 Nebula Award for Best Novella, the 2020 Locus Award for Best Novella, 2020 Ignyte Award for Outstanding Novella, and the 2020 Hugo Award for Best Novella. It was a finalist for the 2019 Shirley Jackson Award, the 2019 Los Angeles Times Book Prize inaugural Ray Bradbury Prize, and the 2019 Kitschies. The book also achieved second place for the 2020 Theodore Sturgeon Award.

Amal El-Mohtar, winner of the Best Novella Hugo, at the Hugo Award Ceremony 2026 at Worldcon in Anaheim

El-Mohtar announced in 2019 that This Is How You Lose the Time War had been optioned for television, with scripts to be written by herself and Gladstone.

In 2025, her first solo novella, The River Has Roots, was published by Tor Books. It won the 2025 Nebula Award for Best Novella and 2026 Locus Award for Best Novella. It received a starred review from Kirkus Reviews and was named one of "The 35 Best Books of 2025" by Esquire.

"The core tale will be relatable regardless of a reader’s genre affinity: an ode to sisters’ secret languages, a paean to petty adolescent envy reshaped into the foundation for growing together into adulthood, an anthem for bloody retribution…A book you’ll want to revisit like a favorite song, especially once you know the words to sing along." — Kirkus Reviews, starred review of The River Has Roots

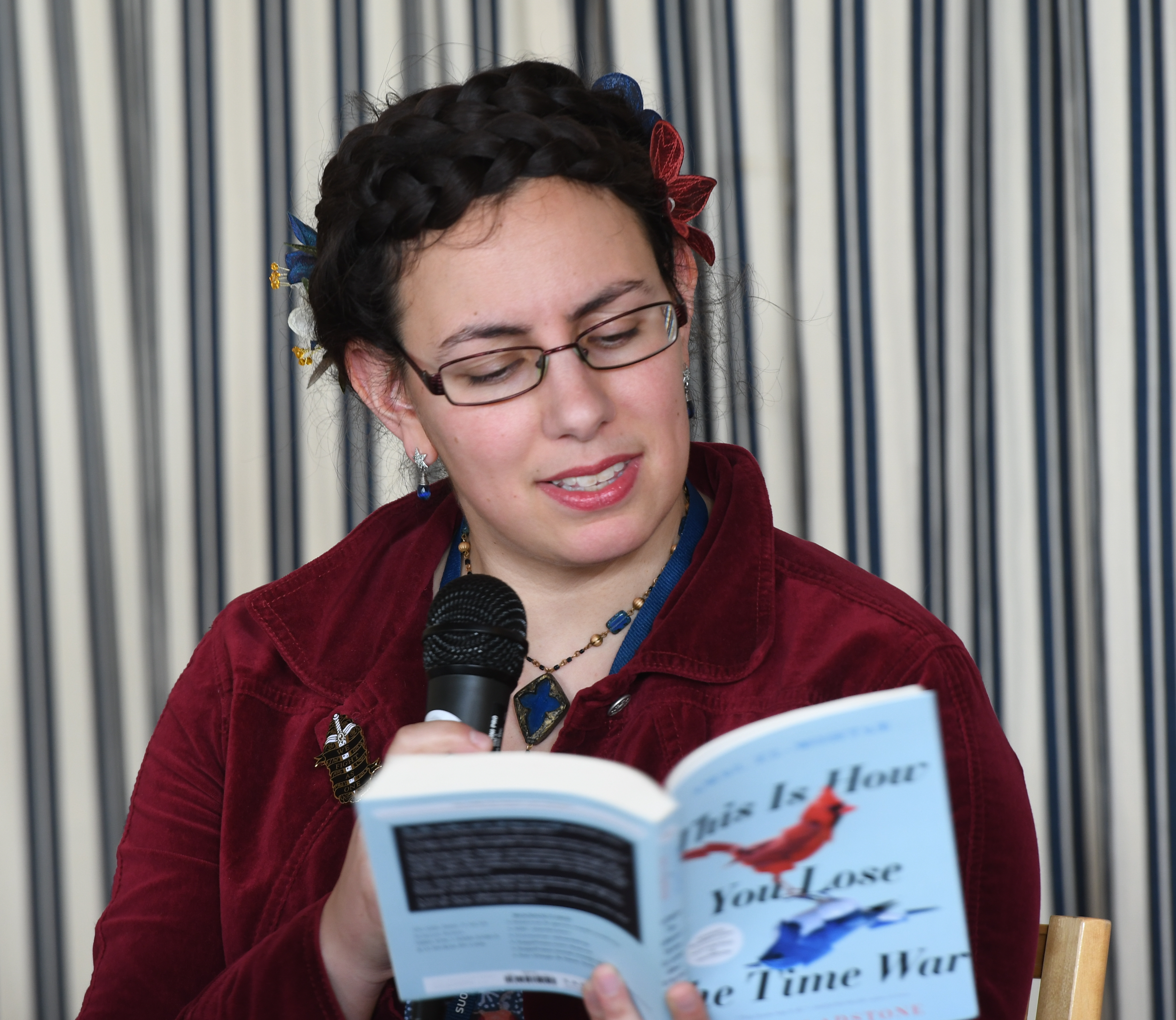
Amal El-Mohtar reading, Åcon 2019.

Her fourth book, Seasons of Glass & Iron: Stories, was published by Tor Books on March 24, 2026. The collection was named one of "The Best Books of 2026" by Esquire.

"El-Mohtar writes beautifully of ancestry, culture, and the natural world—particularly birds and gemstones—and wades thoughtfully through the depths of sorrow, isolation, and otherness…A collection that defies categorization, but is alive on every page." — Kirkus Reviews, review of Seasons of Glass & Iron: Stories

== Personal life ==
She has been married to her husband, Stu West, since 2015. They live in Ottawa and Glasgow. El-Mohtar is bisexual.

== Partial bibliography ==
El-Mohtar's full bibliography includes an extensive list of short stories, poems, essays, and reviews.

=== Novellas ===
- This Is How You Lose the Time War (with Max Gladstone), Saga Press, 2019 ISBN 9781534431003
- The River Has Roots, Tor Books, 2025 ISBN 9781250341082

=== Short story collections ===
- The Honey Month, Papaveria Press, 2010 ISBN 978-1907881008
- Seasons of Glass & Iron: Stories, Tor Publishing Group, 2026 ISBN 9781250341006

== Awards ==
Year	Title	Award	Category	Result	Ref.
2009	"Songs to an Ancient City"	Rhysling Award	Best Short Poem	Won	
2009	"Damascus Divides the Lovers by Zero; or, The City Is Never Finished" (with Catherynne M. Valente)	Rhysling Award	Best Long Poem	Third Place	
2010	"The Green Book"	Nebula Award	Short Story	Nominated	
2011	"Peach-Creamed Honey"	Rhysling Award	Best Short Poem	Won	
2014	"Turning the Leaves"	Rhysling Award	Best Short Poem	Won	
2015	"The Truth About Owls"	Locus Award	Short Story	Won	
2015	"Madeleine"	Nebula Award	Short Story	Nominated	
2016	"Madeleine"	Locus Award	Short Story	Nominated	
2016	"Pockets"	World Fantasy Award	Short Fiction	Nominated	
2016	"Seasons of Glass and Iron"	Nebula Award	Short Story	Won	
2017	"Seasons of Glass and Iron"	Aurora Award	Short Fiction	Finalist	
2017	"Seasons of Glass and Iron"	Hugo Award	Short Story	Won	
2017	"Seasons of Glass and Iron"	Locus Award	Short Story	Won	
2017	"Seasons of Glass and Iron"	World Fantasy Award	Short Fiction	Nominated	
2017	"Seasons of Glass and Iron"	Theodore Sturgeon Award	—	Finalist	
2019	This is How You Lose the Time War	BSFA Award	Shorter Fiction	Won	
2019	This is How You Lose the Time War	Kitschies	Novella	Finalist	
2019	This is How You Lose the Time War	Los Angeles Times Book Prize	Ray Bradbury Prize	Finalist	
2019	This is How You Lose the Time War	Nebula Award	Novella	Won	
2019	This is How You Lose the Time War	Shirley Jackson Award	Novella	Finalist	
2020	This is How You Lose the Time War	Aurora Award	Best Short Fiction	Won	
2020	This is How You Lose the Time War	Hugo Award	Novella	Won	
2020	This is How You Lose the Time War	Locus Award	Novella	Won	
2020	This is How You Lose the Time War	Ignyte Award	Novella	Won	
2020	This is How You Lose the Time War	Theodore Sturgeon Award	—	Second Place	
2024	"John Hollowback and the Witch"	World Fantasy Award	Short Fiction	Nominated	
2025	The River Has Roots	BSFA Award	Shorter Fiction	Nominated	
2025	The River Has Roots	Nebula Award	Novella	Won	
2026	The River Has Roots	Aurora Award	Novelette/Novella	Won	
2026	The River Has Roots	British Fantasy Award	Novella	Won	
2026	The River Has Roots	Hugo Award	Novella	Won	
2026	The River Has Roots	Ignyte Award	Novella	Won	
2026	The River Has Roots	Locus Award	Novella	Won	
2026	The River Has Roots	World Fantasy Award	Long Fiction	Nominated	
2026	The River Has Roots	Premio Ignotus	Foreign Short Fiction	Won	
