= Fran Wilde (author) =

American novelist

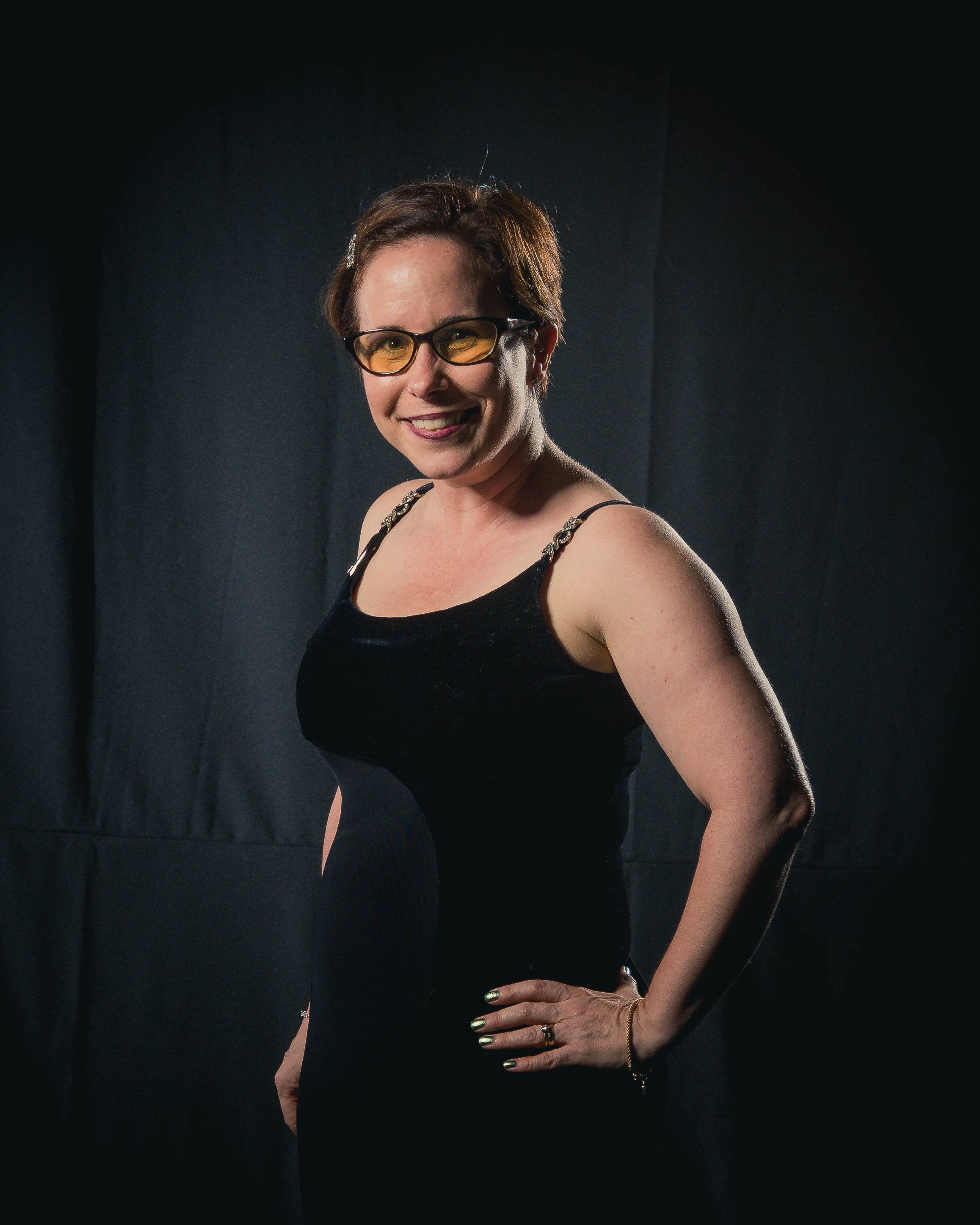
- Fran Wilde at Worldcon in Helsinki, 2017.
- Born: 1972 (age 53–54); Philadelphia, Pennsylvania, U.S.
- Education: University of Virginia (BA); Warren Wilson College (MFA)
- Occupation: Writer
- Writing career
- Period: 1981–present
- Genres: Science fiction Fantasy
- Notable work: The Bone Universe
- Notable awards: Andre Norton Award
- Website: franwilde.net

Fran Wilde (born 1972) is an American science fiction and fantasy writer and blogger. Her debut novel, Updraft, was nominated for the 2016 Nebula Award, and won the 2016 Andre Norton Award and the 2016 Compton Crook Award. Her debut middle grade novel, Riverland, won the 2019 Andre Norton Award, was named an NPR Best Book of 2019 and was a Lodestar Finalist. Wilde is the first person to win two Andre Norton Awards. Her short fiction has appeared in Asimov's Science Fiction, Nature, Tor.com, Uncanny Magazine, and elsewhere. Her fiction explores themes of social class, disability, disruptive technology, and empowerment against a backdrop of engineering and artisan culture.

== Early life ==
Wilde was born in Philadelphia, Pennsylvania in 1972. She attended the University of Virginia, earning a BA in English with honors in 1994. She then went on to earn a MFA in poetry from Warren Wilson College in 1996 and a master's degree in information architecture and interaction design from the University of Baltimore in 2001.

== Career ==
Prior to publishing, Wilde worked as a sailing instructor, a jeweler's assistant, a teacher and professor, and a web and game developer.

Her first published novel grew from a short story she developed for the 2011 Viable Paradise writing workshop. She has published a number of short stories and completed several novels. She writes for the blog GeekMom and runs the blog and podcast Cooking the Books. She attended Taos Toolbox in 2012 and served as an Endeavor Award judge in 2015, and a Norton Jury Member in 2016.

Wilde is the writer and creator of the podcast called Machina produced by Realm. The audio drama was a twelve episode series that followed the fictional story of two companies competing to bring artificial intelligence to Mars.

Wilde is the Director of the Genre Fiction MFA Concentration at Western Colorado University.

Her debut novel, Updraft, was the first novel to be simultaneously nominated for a Nebula and Andre Norton Award. Her work has been a finalist for six Nebula Awards, three Hugo Awards, two Locus Awards, a World Fantasy Award, and a Lodestar.

Wilde is a member of the Science Fiction and Fantasy Writers of America.

== Personal life ==
Wilde lives and works in Philadelphia, PA with her family.

== Bibliography ==
=== Novels ===
- A Philosophy of Thieves. The Canarvier Files, #1. Erehwon. September 30, 2025.
- The Book of Gems. Gem Universe, #3. Tordotcom. 2023.
- The Fire Opal Mechanism. Gem Universe, #2. Tordotcom. 2019.
- The Jewel and Her Lapidary. Gem Universe, #1. Tordotcom. 2016.
- Riverland. Abrams/Amulet. 2019. (Note: Winner: 2020 Andre Norton Award. Nominee: 2020 Lodestar Award for Best Young Adult Book. 2019 NPR Best Book. Starred Reviews from Booklist and Shelf Awareness.)
- The Ship of Stolen Words. Amulet. 2021.

==== The Bone Universe Series ====
1. Updraft. New York: Tor Books. 2015. (Note: Winner: 2016 Andre Norton Award and Compton Crook Award for Best Debut Novel. Finalist: 2016 Nebula Award for Best Novel. 2016 Nominee for Best YA Novel at the Dragon Awards.)
2. Cloudbound. New York: Tor Books. 2016. (Note: 2017 Locus Recommended Reading List.)
3. Horizon. New York: Tor Books. 2017. (Note: 2018 Locus Finalist.)

=== Stories ===
- Schaefer, Elizabeth, ed. (August 29, 2023). "No Contingency". From a Certain Point of View: Return of the Jedi. Star Wars. Random House Worlds. ISBN 9780593597910.
