= Crawford Award =

Literary award for debut fantasy authors

- Awarded for: A debut fantasy novel published in the previous calendar year
- Presented by: International Association for the Fantastic in the Arts (IAFA)
- First award: 1985; 41 years ago
- Website: iaftfita.wildapricot.org/Awards

The IAFA William L. Crawford Fantasy Award (short: Crawford Award) is a literary award given to a writer whose first fantasy book was published during the preceding calendar year. It's one of several awards presented by the International Association for the Fantastic in the Arts (IAFA) and is presented at the International Conference of the Fantastic in the Arts each March in Orlando.

In order to be eligible, a title must be the author’s first fantasy book; it is permissible for an author active in different genres to be submitted, so long as it is their first fantasy book. In addition to novels and novellas, collections of poetry, short stories, and fiction aimed at younger readers are all eligible.

The Prize was conceived and established with the help of Andre Norton, who continued to sponsor it for many years. The award is named after the publisher and editor William L. Crawford (1911-1984). It was administered by noted Locus reviewer, Gary K. Wolfe from 1985 to 2023. As of 2026, the administrator is critic Farah Mendlesohn.

== Winners and finalists ==
^{*} Winner ^{†} Runner-up / 2nd place ^{†}^{†} 3rd place § Commendation

Year	Author	Work	Ref.
1985	Charles de Lint*	Moonheart	
1986	Nancy Willard*	Things Invisible to See	
1987	Judith Tarr*	The Hound and the Falcon trilogy	
1987	Paul Hazel	The Finnbranch trilogy	
1987	Guy Gavriel Kay	The Fionavar Tapestry series	
1987	Greg Bear	The Infinity Concerto	
1987	Greg Bear	Serpent Mage	
1987	Timothy Findley	Not Wanted on the Voyage	
1987	Dan Simmons	Song of Kali	
1987	Tad Williams	Tailchaser's Song	
1988	Elizabeth Marshall Thomas*	Reindeer Moon	
1988	Pat O'Shea	The Hounds of the Morrigan	
1988	Connie Willis	Lincoln's Dreams	
1988	Richard Grant	Rumors of Spring	
1988	Bruce Fergusson	The Shadow of His Wings	
1988	Heather Gladney	Teot's War	
1988	Emma Bull	War for the Oaks	
1988	Geoff Ryman	The Warrior Who Carried Life	
1989	Michaela Roessner*	Walkabout Woman	
1989	Lewis Shiner	Deserted Cities of the Heart	
1989	Melanie Rawn	Dragon Prince	
1989	Mary Tannen	Second Sight	
1989	Elizabeth Moon	Sheepfarmer's Daughter	
1990	Jeanne Larsen*	Silk Road	
1990	Tanya Huff	Child of the Grove	
1990	Tanya Huff	The Last Wizard	
1990	Zohra Greenhalgh	Contrarywise	
1990	Milorad Pavić	Dictionary of the Khazars	
1990	Matt Ruff	Fool on the Hill	
1990	Brian Brett	The Fungus Garden	
1990	Alida Van Gores	Mermaid's Song	
1990	Elizabeth Moon	The Deed of Paksenarrion series	
1991	Michael Scott Rohan*	Winter of the World trilogy	
1991	Tom Holt	Expecting Someone Taller	
1991	Michael Kandel	In Between Dragons	
1991	Elyse Guttenberg	Sunder, Eclipse & Seed	
1991	Tom De Haven	Walker of Worlds	
1992	Greer Ilene Gilman*	Moonwise	
1992	Faren Miller	The Illusionists	
1992	Güneli Gün	On the Road to Baghdad	
1993	Susan Palwick*	Flying in Place	
1993	Robert Antoni	Divina Trace	
1993	Nick Bantock	Griffin and Sabine	
1994	Judith Katz*	Running Fiercely Toward a High Thin Sound	
1994	Roseanne Daryl Thomas	The Angel Carver	
1994	Noriko Ogiwara	Dragon Sword and Wind Child	
1994	Christina Askounis	The Dream of Stone	
1994	Martha Wells	The Element of Fire	
1994	Poppy Z. Brite	Lost Souls	
1994	Bev Jafek	The Man Who Took a Bite Out of His Wife	
1994	Patrice Kindl	Owl in Love	
1994	Wendy Walker	The Secret Service	
1994	Elizabeth Willey	The Well-Favored Man	
1995	Jonathan Lethem*	Gun, with Occasional Music	
1995	Steve Weiner	The Museum of Love	
1995	Flynn Connolly	The Rising of the Moon	
1996	Sharon Shinn*	The Shape-Changer's Wife	
1997	Candas Jane Dorsey*	Black Wine	
1997	Liz Jensen	Egg Dancing	
1997	Ian McDowell	Mordred's Curse	
1997	Lucy Sussex	The Scarlet Rider	
1997	Paul Witcover	Waking Beauty	
1997	Larissa Lai	When FOX is a Thousand	
1998	Chitra Bannerjee Divakaruni*	Mistress of Spices	
1998	Jean Hegland^{†}	Into the Forest	
1998	Marella Sands^{†}^{†}	Skyknife	
1998	Stephen Dedman	The Art of Arrow-Cutting	
1998	J. S. Russell	Celestial Dogs	
1998	David B. Coe	Children of Amarid	
1998	Matthew Woodring Stover	Iron Dawn	
1998	Ian McDowell	Merlin's Gift	
1998	Ian McDowell	Mordred's Curse	
1999	David B. Coe*	Children of Amarid	
1999	David B. Coe*	The Outlanders	
1999	James Stoddard^{†}	The High House	
1999	Anne Bishop^{†}^{†}	Daughter of the Blood	
1999	Rafi Zabor	The Bear Comes Home	
1999	Michael H. Payne	The Blood Jaguar	
1999	Nalo Hopkinson	Brown Girl in the Ring	
1999	Kristen Britain	Green Rider	
1999	Marcos Donnelly	Prophets for the End of Time	
1999	Garth Stein	Raven Stole the Moon	
1999	Elizabeth Kerner	Song of the Silence: The Tale of Lanen Kaelar	
2000	Anne Bishop*	Black Jewels Trilogy	
2000	Elizabeth Haydon^{†}	Rhapsody: Child of Blood	
2000	Steven Kotler	The Angle Quickest for Flight	
2000	Kristine Smith	Code of Conduct	
2000	Michael Cisco	The Divinity Student	
2000	China Miéville	King Rat	
2000	Joanne Bertin	The Last Dragonlord	
2000	Lilian Nattel	The River Midnight	
2000	Thomas Harlan	The Shadow of Ararat	
2000	Jan Lars Jensen	Shiva 3000	
2001	Kij Johnson*	The Fox Woman	
2002	Jasper Fforde*	The Eyre Affair	
2003	Alexander C. Irvine*	A Scattering of Jades	
2003	Sarah Singleton	The Crow Maiden	
2003	Naomi Kritzer	Fires of the Faithful	
2003	Scott Nicholson	The Red Church	
2003	Charles Dickinson	A Shortcut in Time	
2003	James A. Hetley	The Summer Country	
2003	Michael Chabon	Summerland	
2003	Caitlin Sweet	A Telling of Stars	
2004	K. J. Bishop*	The Etched City	
2005	Steph Swainston*	The Year of Our War	
2006	Joe Hill*	20th Century Ghosts	
2006	Judith Berman	Bear Daughter	
2006	Frances Hardinge	Fly by Night	
2006	Holly Phillips	In the Palace of Repose	
2006	Sarah Monette	Melusine	
2006	Anna Tambour	Spotted Lily	
2006	Hal Duncan	Vellum	
2007	M. Rickert*	Map of Dreams	
2007	Theodora Goss	In the Forest of Forgetting	
2007	Scott Lynch	The Lies of Locke Lamora	
2007	Daniel Abraham	A Shadow in Summer	
2007	Alan DeNiro	Skinny Dipping in the Lake of the Dead: Stories	
2007	Keith Donohue	The Stolen Child	
2007	Naomi Novik	Temeraire (Note: Released in the United States as His Majesty's Dragon)	
2008	Christopher Barzak*	One for Sorrow	
2008	Ysabeau S. Wilce	Flora Segunda	
2008	Ron Currie Jr.	God Is Dead	
2008	Laird Barron	The Imago Sequence and Other Stories	
2008	Ellen Klages	Portable Childhoods	
2009	Daryl Gregory*	Pandemonium	
2009	Doug Dorst	Alive in Necropolis	
2009	David J. Schwartz	Superpowers	
2009	Felix Gilman	Thunderer	
2009	J. M. McDermott	Last Dragon	
2010	Jedediah Berry*	The Manual of Detection	
2010	Robert V.S. Redick§	The Red Wolf Conspiracy (Note: This work was ruled ineligible. Nevertheless, the jury found that it was "highly regarded" and wished to honor it with a special commendation.)	
2010	Robert V.S. Redick§	The Ruling Sea	
2010	Michal Ajvaz§	The Other City	
2010	Deborah Biancotti	A Book of Endings	
2010	Kari Sperring	Living with Ghosts	
2010	Ali Shaw	The Girl With Glass Feet	
2011	Karen Lord*	Redemption in Indigo	
2011	Robert Jackson Bennett§	Mr. Shivers	
2011	Amelia Beamer§	The Loving Dead (Note: Some nominators viewed this book as centrally a science fiction work, which would disqualify it for the Crawford Award. Science fiction books are excluded from eligibility under the terms set by Andre Norton, the award's founder.)	
2011	Lauren Beukes	Zoo City	
2011	N. K. Jemisin	The Hundred Thousand Kingdoms	
2011	Anna Kendall	Crossing Over	
2012	Genevieve Valentine*	Mechanique: A Tale of the Circus Tresaulti	
2012	Erin Morgenstern	The Night Circus	
2012	Téa Obreht	The Tiger's Wife	
2012	Stina Leicht	Of Blood and Honey	
2012	Ransom Riggs	Miss Peregrine's Home for Peculiar Children	
2013	Karin Tidbeck*	Jagganath: Stories	
2013	Rachel Hartman^{†}	Seraphina	
2013	Saladin Ahmed	Throne of the Crescent Moon	
2013	Roz Kaveney	Rituals	
2013	Kiini Ibura Salaam	Ancient, Ancient	
2014	Sofia Samatar*	A Stranger in Olondria	
2014	Yoon Ha Lee	Conservation of Shadows	
2014	Helene Wecker	The Golem and the Jinni	
2014	N. A. Sulway	Rupetta	
2015 (Note: In 2015, the selection resulted in a tie for the first time in the award's history. Zen Cho and Stephanie Feldman were named co-winners.)	Zen Cho*	Spirits Abroad	
2015	Stephanie Feldman*	The Angel of Losses	
2015	Ghalib Islam	Fire in the Unnameable Country	
2015	Sarah Tolmie	The Stone Boatmen	
2015	Greg Bechtel	Boundary Problems	
2015	Jessie Burton	The Miniaturist	
2016	Kai Ashante Wilson*	The Sorcerer of the Wildeeps	
2016	Natasha Pulley	The Watchmaker of Filigree Street	
2016	Ken Liu	The Grace of Kings	
2016	Indra Das	The Devourers	
2016	Seth Dickinson	The Traitor Baru Cormorant	
2016	Adrienne Celt	The Daughters	
2017	Charlie Jane Anders*	All the Birds in the Sky	
2017	Rose Lemberg	Marginalia to Stone Bird	
2017	Maria Turtschaninoff	Maresi	
2017	Michael Wehunt	Greener Pastures	
2018	Carmen Maria Machado*	Her Body and Other Parties	
2018	S. A. Chakraborty	The City of Brass	
2018	Ruthanna Emrys	Winter Tide	
2018	Sam J. Miller	The Art of Starving	
2018	K. Arsenault Rivera	The Tiger's Daughter	
2018	Sandra Unerman	Spellhaven	
2019	R. F. Kuang*	The Poppy War	
2019	P. Djèlí Clark	The Black God's Drums	
2019	Rachel Fellman	The Breath of the Sun	
2019	Kate Heartfield	Armed in Her Fashion	
2019	John Schoffstall	Half-Witch	
2019	Rebecca Roanhorse	Trail of Lightning	
2020	Tamsyn Muir*	Gideon the Ninth	
2020	Alix E. Harrow^{†}	The Ten Thousand Doors of January	
2020	Jenn Lyons	The Ruin of Kings	
2020	Emily Tesh	Silver in the Wood	
2021	Nghi Vo*	The Empress of Salt and Fortune	
2021	Michael DeLuca	Night Roll	
2021	Julian Jarboe	Everyone on the Moon Is Essential Personnel	
2021	Kathleen Jennings	Flyaway	
2021	C. J. LaVigne	In Veritas	
2021	Premee Mohamed	Beneath the Rising	
2022	Usman T. Malik*	Midnight Doorways: Fables from Pakistan	
2022	E. Lily Yu	On Fragile Waves	
2022	Isabel Yap	Never Have I Ever	
2023	Simon Jimenez*	The Spear Cuts Through Water	
2023	Maya Deane	Wrath Goddess Sing	
2023	Naseem Jamnia	The Bruising of Qilwa	
2023	Alex Jennings	The Ballad of Perilous Graves	
2023	Jacob Kerr	The Green Man of Eshwood Hall	
2024	Vajra Chandrasekera*	The Saint of Bright Doors	
2024	Juhani Karila	Summer Fishing in Lapland	
2024	B. Pladek	Dry Land	
2024	Wole Talabi	Shigidi and the Brass Head of Obalufon	
2024	Emma Törzs	Ink Blood Sister Scribe	
2025	Jared Pechaček*	The West Passage	
2025	Meihan Boey	The Formidable Miss Cassidy	
2025	Gareth Brown	The Book of Doors	
2025	Ricardo Chavez (text)	The Book of Denial	
2025	Alejandro Magallanes (art)	The Book of Denial	
2025	Lawrence Schimel (translation)	The Book of Denial	
2025	Cécile Cristofari	Elephants in Bloom	
2025	L. B. Hazelthorn	Rare Birds	
2025	Sung-il Kim (text)	Blood of the Old Kings	
2025	Anton Hur (translation)	Blood of the Old Kings	
2025	John Wiswell	Someone You Can Build a Nest In	
2026	Christopher Caldwell*	Call and Response	
2026	Ibi Zoboi	(S)kin	
2026	Natalia Theodoridou	Sour Cherry	
2026	Emily Yu-Xuan Qin	Aunt Tigress	
2026	Caskey Russell	The Door on the Sea	
2026	Martin Cahill	Audition for the Fox	
