= Aurora Award for Best Novelette/Novella =

Canadian award for science fiction and fantasy

The Aurora Awards are granted annually by the Canadian SF and Fantasy Association and SFSF Boreal Inc.

The Award for Best Novella/Novelette was first awarded in 2021. It became a dedicated category, distinct from the Award for Best Novel and Award for Best Short Fiction, providing additional exposure for medium length sci-fi and fantasy literature, and represents writing with scope and word count between the two.

== English-language Award ==
=== Winners and nominees ===
* Winners and joint winners

Year	Author(s)	Work	Publisher/Publication	Result	Ref
2021	Derek Künsken*	"Tool Use by the Humans of Danzhai County"	Asimov's (Vol 44, No 7&8), Jul/Aug 2020	Winner	
2021	Ian Rogers	"Go Fish"	Tor.com, 15 Apr 2020	Finalist	
2021	Rich Larson	"How Quini the Squid Misplaced His Klobucar"	Tor.com, 15 Jan 2020	Finalist	
2021	L. X. Beckett	"The Immolation of Kev Magee"	Clarkesworld (#167), Aug 2020	Finalist	
2021	Rebecca Campbell	"An Important Failure"	Clarkesworld (#167), Aug 2020	Finalist	
2021	A. C. Wise	"To Sail the Black"	Clarkesworld (#170), Nov 2020	Finalist	
2022	Premee Mohamed*	The Annual Migration of Clouds	ECW Press	Winner	
2022	Julie E. Czerneda	"Decay in Five Stages"	Derelict (2021), ed. David B Coe and Joshua Palmatier	Finalist	
2022	Hayden Trenholm & Liz Westbrook-Trenholm	"Lay Down Your Heart"	Seasons Between Us: Tales of Identities and Memories (2021), ed. Susan Forest and Lucas K. Law	Finalist	
2022	Silvia Moreno-Garcia	The Return of the Sorceress	Subterranean Press	Finalist	
2022	Premee Mohamed	These Lifeless Things	Solaris Books	Finalist	
2023	Fonda Lee*	"The Jade Setter of Janloon"	Subterranean Press	Winner	
2023	C. L. Polk	"Even Though I Knew the End"	Tordotcom	Finalist	
2023	Kelly Robson	"High Times in the Low Parliament"	Tordotcom	Finalist	
2023	Eric Choi	A Sky and a Heaven	Just Like Being There	Finalist	
2023	Silvia Moreno-Garcia	"The Tiger Came to the Mountains"	Amazon Original Stories	Finalist	
2024	Fonda Lee*	Untethered Sky	Tordotcom	Winner	
2024	Tiffany Morris	Green Fuse Burning	Stelliform	Finalist	
2024	Ai Jiang	"I AM AI"	Shortwave Media	Finalist	
2024	Nalo Hopkinson	The Most Strongest Obeah Woman of the World	Out There Screaming: An Anthology of New Black Horror (Random House)	Finalist	
2024	Avi Silver	Pluralities	Atthis Arts	Finalist	
2025	Premee Mohamed	The Butcher of the Forest	Tordotcom	Winner	
2025	Geoffrey W. Cole	Zebra Meridian	Zebra Meridian & Other Stories	Finalist	
2025	Suzan Palumbo	Countess	ECW	Finalist	
2025	A.D. Sui	The Dragonfly Gambit	Neon Hemlock	Finalist	
2025	Hayden Trenholm	Carter's Refugio	Analog 9-10/24	Finalist	
2026	Amal El-Mohtar*	The River Has Roots	Tordotcom	Winner	
2026	Premee Mohamed	The First Thousand Trees	ECW Press	Finalist	
2026	Michèle Laframboise	"In the Gardener’s Service"	Asimov’s, July/August	Finalist	
2026	Silvia Moreno-Garcia	"The Lure of Stone"	Uncanny Magazine, Issue Sixty-Six	Finalist	
2026	Ai Jiang	A Palace Near the Wind	Titan Books	Finalist	

== See also ==
- Nebula Award–Novella
- Nebula Award–Novelette
- Hugo Award–Novella
- Hugo Award–Novelette
- WFA–Novella
- Locus Award–Novella
- Locus Award–Novelette
