= Ascendant (disambiguation) =

In astrology, the ascendant is the sign ascending on the eastern horizon.

Ascendant may also refer to:

- Ascendant (film), cancelled film in the Divergent series
- "Ascendant", song by Elvin Jones from The Ultimate
- "Ascendant", song by Decrepit Birth from Axis Mundi
- Their Bright Ascendency, also referred to as Ascendant, a fantasy novel trilogy by K. Arsenault Rivera
