= Beneath the Rising =

2020 science fiction/cosmic horror novel by Premee Mohamed

- Author: Premee Mohamed
- Language: English
- Series: Beneath the Rising
- Release number: 1
- Genre: Science fiction; cosmic horror
- Publisher: Solaris Books
- Publication date: 3 Mar 2020
- Pages: 464 (paperback)
- ISBN: 9781781087862
- Followed by: A Broken Darkness

Beneath the Rising is a 2020 science fiction/cosmic horror novel by Premee Mohamed. It was first published by Solaris Books.

== Synopsis ==
When teenage super-scientist Joanna "Johnny" Chambers invents a clean energy generator in 2002, it draws the attention of malevolent extradimensional gods. Now, Johnny and her childhood best friend Nick Prasad must travel the world in a desperate attempt to find and close the Gate before a cosmic alignment allows the forces of evil to return.

== Reception and awards ==
James Nicoll lauded Mohamed's depiction of "the vexed relationship between Johnny and Nick", and observed that her portrayal of the Ancient Ones as "highly invested in preventing anyone anywhere from enjoying long-term happiness" made them the equivalent of "inter-dimensional griefers".

At Strange Horizons, S. Qiouyi Lu emphasized that, despite the many positive outcomes of Johnny's inventions, Johnny is still a "villainous mad scientist" who "channel(s) great evil", and commended Mohamed for not romanticizing the codependent nature of Nick's magically-enforced love for Johnny which, Lu felt, made Nick a slave; ultimately, Lu found the novel to be "near-flawless", with a "brilliantly constructed narrative" that also serves as an "extended metaphor" in which "Johnny's covenant, and Nick's role as her 'companion,' are tools to critique the legacy of colonialism".

Lu further explored the novel in an essay at Tor.com, in which they described Johnny as "a symbol for coloniality", and noted that Indo-Guyanese-Canadian Nick's identity as a self-described "brown" man in the medium-term aftermath of 9/11 (even if, in the world of the novel, the attacks on the World Trade Center narrowly failed when both jetliners crashed into the Hudson River) "is not an incidental part of the narrative — it drives the narrative," and shapes not just Nick's internal voice but also "how he reacts and makes decisions".

Year	Award	Category	Result	Ref.
2021	Aurora Award	Novel	Nominated	
2021	British Fantasy Award	Horror Novel	Shortlisted	
2021	Crawford Award	—	Finalist	
2021	Locus Award	First Novel	Finalist	

== Background ==
Mohamed wrote the novel's first draft in 2002, but did not begin submitting it to publishers until 2015. She has stated that the tensions between Nick and Johnny, who differ significantly in both race and class, are based on her own late-teenage relationships with friends "who were in different social classes to me and who were mostly white".
