= Waters of Versailles =

2015 fantasy novella by Kelly Robson

"Waters of Versailles" is a 2015 fantasy novella by Kelly Robson, about plumbing. It was first published by Tor.com.

== Synopsis ==
Sylvain de Guilherand introduces toilets and other aspects of indoor plumbing to the Palais de Versailles during the reign of Louis XV; however, this is complicated by the attitudes of the aristocracy — and by the personality of the captive nixie he is secretly using to power the system.

== Reception ==
"Waters of Versailles" won the 2016 Aurora Award for Short Fiction, and was a finalist for the 2015 Nebula Award for Best Novella and the 2016 World Fantasy Award—Long Fiction.

Jonathan Strahan called it "light, funny, and perceptive", while Gary K. Wolfe considered it to be "clever".

== Themes ==
Robson has stated that the themes of the story are "the act of taking nurturing creates love, and love changes you" and "trying to be please everyone is a recipe for disaster".

== Sequel ==
In 2024, Robson published a sequel, "The High Cost of Heat", in The Sunday Morning Transport.
