= A. M. Dellamonica =

Canadian science fiction writer (born 1968)

A.M. Dellamonica
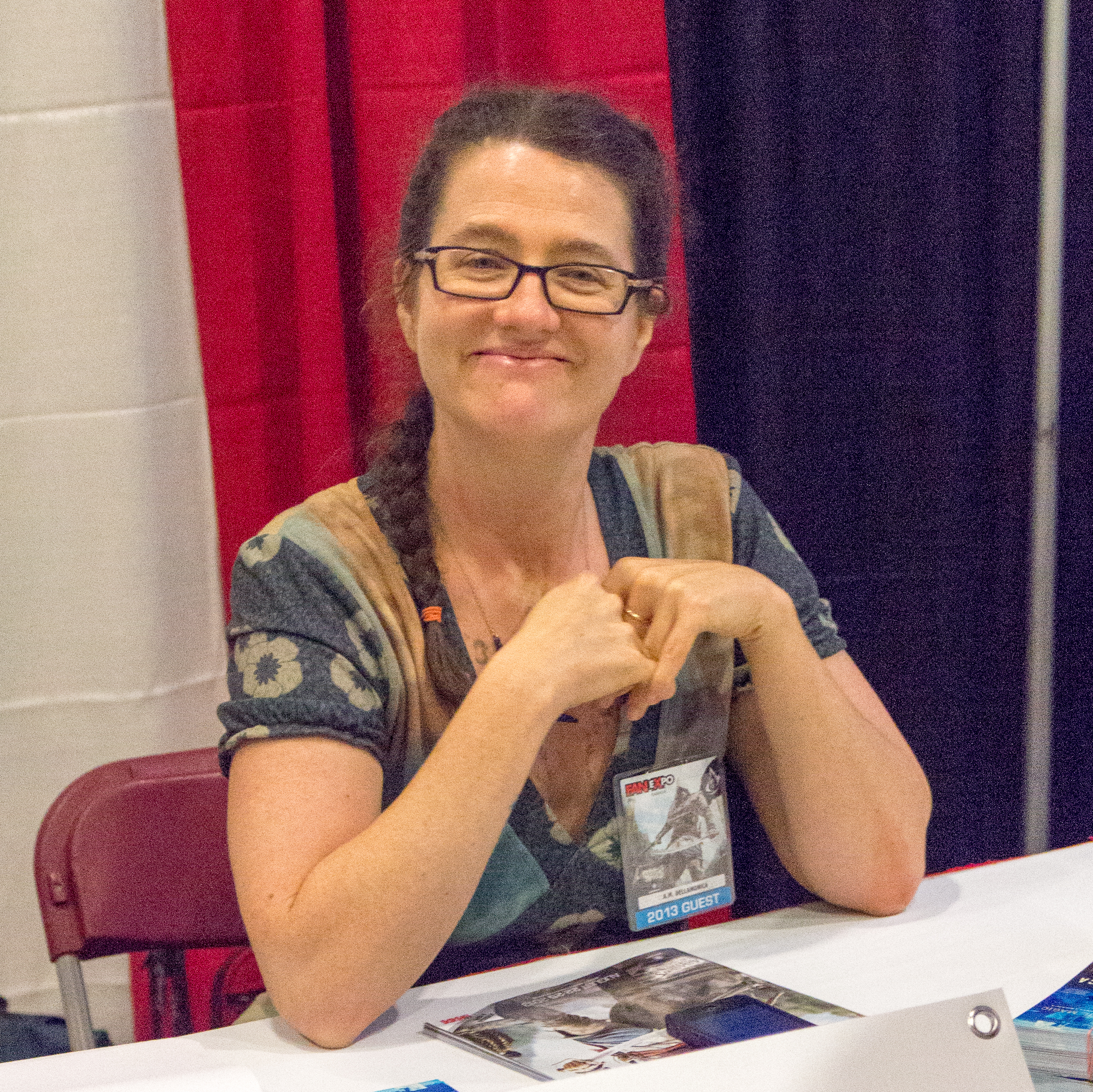
- A.M. Dellamonica at FanExpo 2013 in Toronto
- Born: February 25, 1968 (age 58); Calgary, Alberta, Canada
- Occupation: Writer
- Spouse: Kelly Robson
- Writing career
- Language: English
- Genres: Science Fiction and Fantasy
- Notable awards: Sunburst Award 2010; Aurora Award 2016
- Website: www.alyxdellamonica.com

Alyxandra Margaret "A. M." Dellamonica (born February 25, 1968) is a Canadian speculative fiction writer who has published over forty short stories in the field since the 1980s. Dellamonica writes in a number of subgenres including science fiction, fantasy, and alternate history. Their stories have been selected for "Year's Best" science fiction anthologies in 2002 and 2007. Dellamonica is non-binary.

They attended Clarion West Writers Workshop in 1995 and they are a student in the UBC Opt-Res Creative Writing MFA program.

Dellamonica teaches creative writing online at the UCLA Extension Writer's Program and in person at UTSC. They also review science fiction novels and write articles about publishing for science fiction related websites like Clarkesworld Magazine and for Tor.com.

Their first novel, Indigo Springs, was published by Tor Books in November 2009. Their fourth novel, A Daughter of No Nation, was published in December 2015. Dellamonica's most recent novel is their fifth, The Nature of a Pirate.

== Nominations and awards ==
Dellamonica's Joan of Arc alternate history story "A Key to the Illuminated Heretic" was nominated for the 2005 Sidewise Award for Alternate History and was on the 2005 Preliminary Nebula Ballot. In 2005, they received the Canada Council for the Arts' Grant for Emerging Artists and in 2015 they received the Ontario Arts Council Grant for Writers' Works in Progress. Dellamonica's first novel, Indigo Springs, was awarded the 2010 Sunburst Award for Canadian Literature of the Fantastic. In 2016, their fourth novel A Daughter of No Nation won the Aurora Award for Best Novel.

== Personal life ==
Dellamonica Robson is married to fellow Canadian science fiction writer Kelly Robson, and lives in Toronto. They and Robson married twice: unofficially in 1989, and again in 2003 after same-sex marriage was legalized in Ontario.

== Bibliography ==
=== Novels ===
==== Indigo Springs ====
1. Indigo Springs, 2009
2. Blue Magic, 2012

==== The Hidden Sea Tales ====
1. Child of a Hidden Sea, 2014
2. A Daughter of No Nation, 2015
3. The Nature of a Pirate, 2016

=== Short fiction ===
- Lucre's Egg (1994)
- Furlough (1996)
- Homage (1996)
- Jailbreak (1996)
- Crusader (1996)
- Love Equals Four, Plus Six (1996)
- The One-Act (1997)
- Novice (1998)
- The Dark Hour (1999)
- Nevada (2000)
- The Girl Who Ate Garbage (2001) with Jessica Reisman
- Three Times Over the Falls (2002)
- A Slow Day at the Gallery (2002)
- Riverboy (2002)
- Living the Quiet Life (2002)
- The Children of Port Allain (2003)
- Cooking Creole (2003)
- Origin of Species (2004)
- Faces of Gemini (2004) [also as by A. M. Dellamonica]
- The Dream Eaters (2004)
- Ruby, in the Storm (2004)
- The Spear Carrier (2005)
- A Key to the Illuminated Heretic (2005)
- Time of the Snake (2007)
- The Sorrow Fair (2008)
- The Cage (2010) [also as by Alyx Dellamonica]
- The Color of Paradox (2014)
- Snow Angel (2014)
- Through Your Eyes Only (2015)
- A Daughter of No Nation (excerpt) (2015)
- Tribes (2016)
- Bottleneck (2017)
- Freezing Rain, a Chance of Falling (2018) [only as by L. X. Beckett]
- Field Trip (2020) [only as by L. X. Beckett]
- Starring You in the Role of the Fourth Rider (2020) [only as by L. X. Beckett]
- The Immolation of Kev Magee (2020) [only as by L. X. Beckett]
- Cat Ladies (2021) [only as by L. X. Beckett]
- The HazMat Sisters (2021) [only as by L. X. Beckett]
- Salvage Blossom (2022) [only as by L. X. Beckett]
- Horsewoman (2023)
