= And What Can We Offer You Tonight =

2021 novella by Premee Mohamed

- 2021 Cover
- Author: Premee Mohamed
- Language: English
- Genre: Science fiction
- Publisher: Neon Hemlock Press
- Publication date: 2021
- Publication place: United States
- Media type: Print (Paperback)
- Pages: 80

And What Can We Offer You Tonight is a 2021 science fiction novella by Premee Mohamed, published by Neon Hemlock Press. It was the winner of the Nebula Award for Best Novella, and the World Fantasy Award for Best Novella.

The story concerns a courtesan whose investigation of the murder of one of her colleagues is complicated when the murdered woman comes back to life.

== Reception ==
In her review for Apex Magazine, Marissa van Uden called the novella "a poetic story about exploitation, stolen histories, and friendship", praising how the humorous dialogue creates realistic characters. Adrienne Martini's review for Locus celebrated it as "a barely controlled scream about power and abuse that infuriates and satisfies."

== Analysis ==
Mohamed has specified that "the reason Winfield comes back to life is never given. I don't think there's a point in explaining it (...) I don't know why she did and that's not the point of the story."

== Awards ==
- Winner of the 2021 Nebula Award for Best Novella
- Winner of the 2022 World Fantasy Award for Best Novella
