= World Fantasy Award—Long Fiction =

Literary award for science fiction or fantasy novellas in English

- Awarded for: The best fantasy story of 10,000 to 40,000 words published in English in the prior calendar year
- Presented by: World Fantasy Convention
- First award: 1982
- Most recent winner: Eden Royce (Psychopomp & Circumstance)
- Website: worldfantasy.org/index.php/awards/

The World Fantasy Awards are given each year by the World Fantasy Convention for the best fantasy fiction published in English during the previous calendar year. The awards have been described by book critics such as The Guardian as a "prestigious fantasy prize", and one of the three most prestigious speculative fiction awards, along with the Hugo and Nebula Awards (which cover both fantasy and science fiction). The World Fantasy Award—Long Fiction is given each year for fantasy stories published in English. A work of fiction is eligible for the category if it is between 10,000 and 40,000 words in length; awards are also given out for longer pieces in the Novel category and shorter lengths in the Short Fiction category.

World Fantasy Award nominees and winners are decided by attendees and judges at the annual World Fantasy Convention. A ballot is posted in June for attendees of the current and previous two conferences to determine two of the finalists, and a panel of five judges adds three or more nominees before voting on the overall winner. The panel of judges is typically made up of fantasy authors and is chosen each year by the World Fantasy Awards Administration, which has the power to break ties. The final results are presented at the World Fantasy Convention at the end of October. Winners were presented with a statue in the form of a bust of H. P. Lovecraft through the 2015 awards; more recent winners receive a statuette of a tree.

During the 45 nomination years, 166 authors have had works nominated; 44 of them have won, including ties and co-authors. Only five authors have won more than once: Elizabeth Hand, with three wins out of nine nominations; Richard Bowes, with two wins out of three nominations; K. J. Parker, who also won twice out of three nominations; Ellen Klages, with two wins out of two nominations; and Kij Johnson, also with two wins out of two nominations. Of authors who have won at least once, Hand has the most nominations, followed by George R. R. Martin at five and Ursula K. Le Guin at four. Lucius Shepard has the most nominations without winning and the most overall at ten; he is followed by Kim Newman, who has six nominations without winning.

== Award name ==
The Novella category has been awarded annually since 1982. Between 1975—when the World Fantasy Awards were instated—and 1982, the short fiction category covered works of up to 40,000 words. In 2016, the name of the category was changed from Best Novella to Long Fiction, before reverting to Novella in 2018. In 2026, the award was once again titled "Long Fiction".

== Winners and nominees ==
In the following table, the years correspond to the date of the ceremony, rather than when the work was first published. Each year links to the corresponding "year in literature". Entries with a yellow background and an asterisk (*) next to the writer's name have won the award; the other entries are the other nominees on the shortlist.

* Winners

Winners and nominees
Year	Author	Work	Publisher/publication	Ref.
1982	Parke Godwin*	"The Fire When It Comes"	The Magazine of Fantasy & Science Fiction	
1982	C. J. Cherryh	Ealdwood	Donald M. Grant	
1982	Robert Holdstock	Mythago Wood	The Magazine of Fantasy & Science Fiction	
1982	Karl Edward Wagner	"The River of Night's Dreaming"	Whispers III (Doubleday)	
1983	Charles L. Grant*	"Confess the Seasons"	Perpetual Light (Warner Books)	
1983	Karl Edward Wagner*	"Beyond Any Measure"	Whispers	
1983	Stephen King	"The Breathing Method"	Different Seasons (Viking Press)	
1983	Fritz Leiber	"Horrible Imaginings"	Death (Playboy Press)	
1983	Charles L. Grant	"Night's Swift Dragons"	Nightmare Seasons (Doubleday)	
1984	Kim Stanley Robinson*	"Black Air"	The Magazine of Fantasy & Science Fiction	
1984	Scott Baker	"The Lurking Duck"	Omni	
1984	Michael Bishop	"The Monkey's Bride"	Heroic Visions (Ace Books)	
1984	Tanith Lee	"Nunc Dimittis"	The Dodd, Mead Gallery of Horror (Dodd, Mead and Company)	
1984	Elizabeth A. Lynn	The Red Hawk	Cheap Street Press	
1985	Geoff Ryman*	"The Unconquered Country"	Interzone	
1985	Stephen King	"The Ballad of the Flexible Bullet"	The Magazine of Fantasy & Science Fiction	
1985	Gerald Pearce	"In the Sumerian Marshes"	Amazing Stories	
1985	Clive Barker	"Jacqueline Ess: Her Will and Testament"	Clive Barker's Books of Blood, Vol. II (Sphere Books)	
1985	Lucius Shepard	"The Man Who Painted the Dragon Griaule"	The Magazine of Fantasy & Science Fiction	
1986	T. E. D. Klein*	"Nadelman's God"	Dark Gods (Viking Press)	
1986	David Morrell	"Dead Image"	Night Visions 2 (Dark Harvest)	
1986	Chelsea Quinn Yarbro	"Do I Dare to Eat a Peach?"	Shadows 8 (Doubleday)	
1986	Peter Dickinson	"Flight"	Imaginary Lands (Ace Books)	
1986	Kate Wilhelm	"The Gorgon Field"	Asimov's Science Fiction	
1987	Orson Scott Card*	"Hatrack River"	Asimov's Science Fiction	
1987	Connie Willis	"Chance"	Asimov's Science Fiction	
1987	Clive Barker	"The Hellbound Heart"	Night Visions 3 (Dark Harvest)	
1987	Tim Powers	Night Moves	Axolotl Press	
1987	J. N. Williamson	"The Night Seasons"	Night Cry	
1988	Ursula K. Le Guin*	"Buffalo Gals, Won't You Come Out Tonight"	Fantasy & Science Fiction	
1988	Robert R. McCammon	"Best Friends"	Night Visions 4 (Dark Harvest)	
1988	Alan Rodgers	"The Boy Who Came Back from the Dead"	Masques II (Maclay & Associates)	
1988	Alan Moore	"A Hypothetical Lizard"	Liavek: Wizard's Row (Ace Books)	
1988	Scott Baker	"Nesting Instinct"	The Architecture of Fear (Arbor House)	
1988	George R. R. Martin	"The Pear-Shaped Man"	Omni	
1988	Lucius Shepard	"Shades"	In the Field of Fire (Tor Books)	
1989	George R. R. Martin*	"The Skin Trade"	Night Visions 5 (Dark Harvest)	
1989	Jane Yolen	The Devil's Arithmetic	Viking Kestrel	
1989	Sheri S. Tepper	"The Gardener"	Night Visions 6 (Dark Harvest)	
1989	Lucius Shepard	"The Scalehunter's Beautiful Daughter"	Asimov's Science Fiction	
1990	John Crowley*	"Great Work of Time"	Novelty (Doubleday)	
1990	Michael Bishop	Apartheid, Superstrings, and Mordecai Thubana	Axolotl Press	
1990	Howard Waldrop	A Dozen Tough Jobs	Mark V. Ziesing	
1990	Lucius Shepard	"The Father of Stones"	Asimov's Science Fiction	
1990	Joe R. Lansdale	"On the Far Side of the Cadillac Desert with Dead Folks"	Book of the Dead (Bantam Books)	
1991	Pat Murphy*	"Bones"	Asimov's Science Fiction	
1991	F. Paul Wilson	"The Barrens"	Lovecraft's Legacy (Tor Books)	
1991	Jonathan Carroll	Black Cocktail	Legend Press	
1991	Joe Haldeman	"The Hemingway Hoax"	Asimov's Science Fiction	
1992	Robert Holdstock*	"The Ragthorn"	A Whisper of Blood (William Morrow and Company)	
1992	Garry Kilworth*	"The Ragthorn"	A Whisper of Blood (William Morrow and Company)	
1992	Kristine Kathryn Rusch	The Gallery of His Dreams	Axolotl Press	
1992	C. J. Cherryh	"Gwydion and the Dragon"	Once Upon a Time (Legend Press)	
1992	Charles de Lint	Our Lady of the Harbour	Axolotl Press	
1992	S. P. Somtow	"The Pavilion of Frozen Women"	Cold Shocks (Avon)	
1992	Darrell Schweitzer	"To Become a Sorcerer"	Weird Tales	
1993	Peter Straub*	"The Ghost Village"	MetaHorror (Abyss)	
1993	Charles de Lint	"Paperjack"	Fantasy & Science Fiction	
1993	Bradley Denton	"The Territory"	Fantasy & Science Fiction	
1993	Jonathan Carroll	"Uh-Oh City"	Fantasy & Science Fiction	
1993	Nina Kiriki Hoffman	Unmasking	Axolotl Press	
1994	Terry Lamsley*	"Under the Crust"	Under the Crust (Wendigo)	
1994	Elizabeth Hand	"The Erl-King"	Full Spectrum 4 (Bantam Spectra)	
1994	Harlan Ellison	Mefisto in Onyx	Mark V. Ziesing	
1994	Jack Cady	"The Night We Buried Road Dog"	Fantasy & Science Fiction	
1994	Walter Jon Williams	"Wall, Stone, Craft"	Fantasy & Science Fiction	
1995	Elizabeth Hand*	"Last Summer at Mars Hill"	Fantasy & Science Fiction	
1995	Peter Straub	"Fee"	Borderlands 4 (Borderlands Press)	
1995	Brian W. Aldiss	"The God Who Slept With Women"	Asimov's Science Fiction	
1995	Lucius Shepard	"The Last Time"	Little Deaths (Millennium)	
1995	Kim Newman	"Out of the Night, When the Full Moon Is Bright..."	The Mammoth Book of Werewolves (Carroll & Graf Publishers)	
1995	Robert Devereaux	"A Slow Red Whisper of Sand"	Love In Vein (HarperPrism)	
1996	Michael Swanwick*	"Radio Waves"	Omni	
1996	Ursula K. Le Guin	"Ether OR"	Asimov's Science Fiction	
1996	Nina Kiriki Hoffman	"Home for Christmas"	Fantasy & Science Fiction	
1996	Jonathan Lethem	"The Insipid Profession of Jonathan Hornebom"	Full Spectrum 5 (Bantam Spectra)	
1996	Michael Marshall Smith	"More Tomorrow"	Dark Terrors (Victor Gollancz)	
1996	Tim Powers	Where They Are Hid	Charnel House	
1997	Mark Helprin*	A City in Winter	Viking Ariel	
1997	Suzy McKee Charnas	"Beauty and the Opéra or The Phantom Beast"	Asimov's Science Fiction	
1997	George R. R. Martin	"Blood of the Dragon"	Asimov's Science Fiction	
1997	Susan Palwick	"GI Jesus"	Starlight 1 (Tor Books)	
1997	Michael Marshall Smith	"Hell Hath Enlarged Herself"	Dark Terrors 2 (Victor Gollancz)	
1998	Richard Bowes*	"Streetcar Dreams"	Fantasy & Science Fiction	
1998	Kim Newman	"Coppola's Dracula"	The Mammoth Book of Dracula (Robinson Publishing)	
1998	Brian Hodge	"The Dripping of Sundered Wineskins"	Love In Vein II (HarperPrism)	
1998	Ellen Kushner	"The Fall of the Kings"	Bending the Landscape: Fantasy (White Wolf Publishing)	
1998	Delia Sherman	"The Fall of the Kings"	Bending the Landscape: Fantasy (White Wolf Publishing)	
1998	Douglas E. Winter	"The Zombies of Madison County"	Dark of the Night (Pumpkin Books)	
1999	Ian R. MacLeod*	"The Summer Isles"	Asimov's Science Fiction	
1999	A. S. Byatt	"Cold"	Elementals: Stories of Fire and Ice (Chatto & Windus)	
1999	Ursula K. Le Guin	"Dragonfly"	Legends (Voyager Books)	
1999	George R. R. Martin	"The Hedge Knight"	Legends (Voyager Books)	
1999	Peter Straub	"Mr. Clubb and Mr. Cuff"	Murder for Revenge (Delacorte Press)	
2000	Laurel Winter*	"Sky Eyes"	Fantasy & Science Fiction	
2000	Jeff VanderMeer*	"The Transformation of Martin Lake"	Palace Corbie Eight (Merrimack Books)	
2000	Lucius Shepard	"Crocodile Rock"	Fantasy & Science Fiction	
2000	Tanith Lee	"Scarlet and Gold"	Weird Tales	
2000	Connie Willis	"The Winds of Marble Arch"	Asimov's Science Fiction	
2000	Michael Meddor	"The Wizard Retires"	Fantasy & Science Fiction	
2001	Steve Rasnic Tem*	The Man on the Ceiling	American Fantasy Press	
2001	Melanie Tem*	The Man on the Ceiling	American Fantasy Press	
2001	Michael Bishop	"Blue Kansas Sky"	Blue Kansas Sky (Golden Gryphon Press)	
2001	Elizabeth Hand	"Chip Crockett's Christmas Carol"	Sci Fiction	
2001	Glen Hirshberg	"Mr. Dark's Carnival"	Shadows and Silence (Ash-Tree Press)	
2001	Susanna Clarke	"Mr. Simonelli or the Fairy Widower"	Black Heart, Ivory Bones (Avon Publications)	
2001	David Case	"Pelican Cay"	Dark Terrors 5 (Victor Gollancz)	
2001	Ted Chiang	"Seventy-Two Letters"	Vanishing Acts (Tor Books)	
2002	S. P. Somtow*	"The Bird Catcher"	The Museum of Horrors (Leisure Books)	
2002	Elizabeth Hand	"Cleopatra Brimstone"	Redshift (Roc Books)	
2002	Lucius Shepard	"Eternity and Afterward"	Fantasy & Science Fiction	
2002	Ursula K. Le Guin	"The Finder"	Tales from Earthsea (Harcourt)	
2002	Paul Di Filippo	"Karuna, Inc."	Fantastic Stories of the Imagination	
2002	Glen Hirshberg	"Struwwelpeter"	Sci Fiction	
2003	Zoran Živković*	"The Library"	Leviathan 3 (The Ministry of Whimsy Press)	
2003	Neil Gaiman	Coraline	HarperCollins	
2003	Elizabeth Hand	"The Least Trumps"	Conjunctions	
2003	Charles de Lint	Seven Wild Sisters	Subterranean Press	
2003	Paul Di Filippo	A Year in the Linear City	PS Publishing	
2004	Greer Gilman*	"A Crowd of Bone"	Trampoline (Small Beer Press)	
2004	Glen Hirshberg	"Dancing Men"	The Dark (Tor Books)	
2004	Jeffrey Ford	"The Empire of Ice Cream"	Sci Fiction	
2004	Simon Clark	"Exorcising Angels"	Exorcising Angels (Earthling Publications)	
2004	Tim Lebbon	"Exorcising Angels"	Exorcising Angels (Earthling Publications)	
2004	Kelly Link	"The Hortlak"	The Dark (Tor Books)	
2005	Michael Shea*	"The Growlimb"	Fantasy & Science Fiction	
2005	Gene Wolfe	"Golden City Far"	Flights (Roc Books)	
2005	Lisa Tuttle	My Death	PS Publishing	
2005	Kim Newman	"Soho Golem"	Sci Fiction	
2005	Leena Krohn	Tainaron: Mail from Another City	Prime Books	
2006	Joe Hill*	Voluntary Committal	Subterranean Press	
2006	Simon Morden	Another War	Telos Publishing	
2006	Laird Barron	"The Imago Sequence"	Fantasy & Science Fiction	
2006	Michael Cunningham	"In the Machine"	Specimen Days (Farrar, Straus and Giroux)	
2006	Kelly Link	"Magic for Beginners"	Magic for Beginners (Small Beer Press)	
2006	Tanith Lee	"UOUS"	The Fair Folk (Science Fiction Book Club)	
2007	Jeffrey Ford*	"Botch Town"	The Empire of Ice Cream (Golden Gryphon Press)	
2007	Norman Partridge	Dark Harvest	Cemetery Dance Publications	
2007	Ysabeau S. Wilce	"The Lineaments of Gratified Desire"	Fantasy & Science Fiction	
2007	Kim Newman	"The Man Who Got Off the Ghost Train"	The Man from the Diogenes Club (MonkeyBrain Books)	
2007	M. Rickert	"Map of Dreams"	Map of Dreams (Golden Gryphon Press)	
2008	Elizabeth Hand*	Illyria	PS Publishing	
2008	Kim Newman	"Cold Snap"	The Secret Files of the Diogenes Club (MonkeyBrain Books)	
2008	Ian R. MacLeod	"The Master Miller's Tale"	Fantasy & Science Fiction	
2008	Robert Edric	The Mermaids	PS Publishing	
2008	Lucius Shepard	"Stars Seen through Stone"	Fantasy & Science Fiction	
2009	Richard Bowes*	"If Angels Fight"	Fantasy & Science Fiction	
2009	Nisi Shawl	"Good Boy"	Filter House (Aqueduct Press)	
2009	Neil Gaiman	Odd and the Frost Giants	Bloomsbury Publishing	
2009	Albert E. Cowdrey	"The Overseer"	Fantasy & Science Fiction	
2009	Peter S. Beagle	"Uncle Chaim and Aunt Rifke and the Angel"	Strange Roads (DreamHaven Books)	
2010	Margo Lanagan*	"Sea-Hearts"	X 6 (Coeur de Lion Publishing)	
2010	Paul Witcover	"Everland"	Everland and Other Stories (PS Publishing)	
2010	Richard Bowes	"I Needs Must Part, the Policeman Said"	Fantasy & Science Fiction	
2010	Steve Duffy	"The Lion's Den"	Cern Zoo (Megazanthus Press)	
2010	Andy Duncan	The Night Cache	PS Publishing	
2010	Kage Baker	The Women of Nell Gwynne's	Subterranean Press	
2011	Elizabeth Hand*	"The Maiden Flight of McCauley's Bellerophon"	Stories (William Morrow and Company)	
2011	Elizabeth Bear	Bone and Jewel Creatures	Subterranean Press	
2011	Michael Byers	The Broken Man	PS Publishing	
2011	Rachel Swirsky	The Lady Who Plucked Red Flowers Beneath the Queen's Window	Subterranean Press	
2011	George R. R. Martin	"The Mystery Knight"	Warriors (Tor Books)	
2011	Tim Lebbon	The Thief of Broken Toys	ChiZine Publications	
2012	K. J. Parker*	"A Small Price to Pay for Birdsong"	Subterranean Magazine	
2012	Elizabeth Hand	"Near Zennor"	A Book of Horrors (Jo Fletcher Books)	
2012	Robert Shearman	"Alice Through the Plastic Sheet"	A Book of Horrors (Jo Fletcher Books)	
2012	Lucius Shepard	"Rose Street Attractors"	Ghosts by Gaslight (Harper Voyager)	
2012	Catherynne M. Valente	"Silently and Very Fast"	Clarkesworld Magazine	
2013	K. J. Parker*	"Let Maps to Others"	Subterranean Magazine	
2013	Laird Barron	"Hand of Glory"	The Book of Cthulhu II (Night Shade Books)	
2013	Brandon Sanderson	The Emperor's Soul	Tachyon Publications	
2013	Lucius Shepard	"The Skull"	The Dragon Griaule (Subterranean Press)	
2013	Kaaron Warren	"Sky"	Through Splintered Walls (Twelfth Planet Press)	
2014	Andy Duncan*	"Wakulla Springs"	Tor.com	
2014	Ellen Klages*	"Wakulla Springs"	Tor.com	
2014	Caitlín R. Kiernan	Black Helicopters	Subterranean Press	
2014	K. J. Parker	"The Sun and I"	Subterranean Magazine	
2014	Veronica Schanoes	"Burning Girls"	Tor.com	
2014	Catherynne M. Valente	Six-Gun Snow White	Subterranean Press	
2015	Daryl Gregory*	We Are All Completely Fine	Tachyon Publications	
2015	Kai Ashante Wilson	"The Devil in America"	Tor.com	
2015	Rachel Swirsky	"Grand Jeté (The Great Leap)"	Subterranean Magazine	
2015	Michael Libling	"Hollywood North"	Fantasy & Science Fiction	
2015	Mary Rickert	"The Mothers of Voorhisville"	Tor.com	
2015	Pasi Ilmari Jääskeläinen	"Where the Trains Turn"	Tor.com	
2016	Kelly Barnhill*	The Unlicensed Magician	PS Publishing	
2016	Bud Webster	"Farewell Blues"	Fantasy & Science Fiction	
2016	Kim Newman	"Guignol"	Horrorology (Jo Fletcher Books)	
2016	Usman T. Malik	"The Pauper Prince and the Eucalyptus Jinn"	Tor.com	
2016	Kelly Robson	"Waters of Versailles"	Tor.com	
2017	Kij Johnson*	The Dream-Quest of Vellitt Boe	Tor.com Publishing	
2017	Victor LaValle	The Ballad of Black Tom	Tor.com Publishing	
2017	Paul F. Olson	"Bloodybones"	Whispered Echoes (Cemetery Dance Publications)	
2017	Seanan McGuire	Every Heart a Doorway	Tor.com Publishing	
2017	Kai Ashante Wilson	A Taste of Honey	Tor.com Publishing	
2018	Ellen Klages*	Passing Strange	Tor.com Publishing	
2018	JY Yang	The Black Tides of Heaven	Tor.com Publishing	
2018	Peter S. Beagle	In Calabria	Tachyon Publications	
2018	Stephen Graham Jones	Mapping the Interior	Tor.com Publishing	
2018	Simon Avery	The Teardrop Method	TTA Press	
2019	Kij Johnson*	"The Privilege of the Happy Ending"	Clarkesworld Magazine	
2019	Brooke Bolander	The Only Harmless Great Thing	Tor.com Publishing	
2019	P. Djèlí Clark	The Black God's Drums	Tor.com Publishing	
2019	Aliette de Bodard	The Tea Master and the Detective	Subterranean Press	
2019	Seanan McGuire	Beneath the Sugar Sky	Tor.com Publishing	
2020	Emily Tesh*	Silver in the Wood	Tor.com Publishing	
2020	Nathan Ballingrud	"The Butcher's Table"	Wounds (Saga Press)	
2020	Rivers Solomon	The Deep	Saga Press	
2020	Daveed Diggs	The Deep	Saga Press	
2020	William Hutson	The Deep	Saga Press	
2020	Jonathan Snipes	The Deep	Saga Press	
2020	C. S. E. Cooney	Desdemona and the Deep	Tor.com Publishing	
2020	Seanan McGuire	In an Absent Dream	Tor.com Publishing	
2021	Tochi Onyebuchi*	Riot Baby	Tor.com Publishing	
2021	Kathleen Jennings	Flyaway	Tor.com Publishing	
2021	R. B. Lemberg	The Four Profound Weaves	Tachyon Publications	
2021	P. Djèlí Clark	Ring Shout	Tor.com Publishing	
2021	Leah Cypess	"Stepsister"	Fantasy & Science Fiction	
2022	Premee Mohamed*	And What Can We Offer You Tonight	Neon Hemlock Press	
2022	Isabel Yap	"A Canticle for Lost Girls"	Never Have I Ever (Small Beer Press)	
2022	A. M. Muffaz	Finches	Vernacular Books	
2022	Elizabeth Hand	"For Sale by Owner"	When Things Get Dark (Penguin Random House)	
2022	Cassandra Khaw	Nothing But Blackened Teeth	Nightfire Books	
2023	Priya Sharma*	Pomegranates	Absinthe Books	
2023	Naseem Jamnia	The Bruising of Qilwa	Tachyon Publications	
2023	C. L. Polk	Even Though I Knew the End	Tordotcom	
2023	Naben Ruthnum	Helpmeet	Undertow Publications	
2023	Dennis Mombauer	The House of Drought	Stelliform Press	
2024	Josh Malerman*	"Half the House Is Haunted"	Spin a Black Yarn (Del Rey Books)	
2024	Kelly Barnhill	The Crane Husband	Tordotcom	
2024	Nghi Vo	Mammoths at the Gates	Tordotcom	
2024	Kelly Link	"Prince Hat Underground"	White Cat, Black Dog (Random House)	
2024	Lina Rather	A Season of Monstrous Conceptions	Tordotcom	
2024	Ursula Vernon (as T. Kingfisher)	Thornhedge	Tor Books/Titan UK)	
2025	R. B. Lemberg*	Yoke of Stars	Tachyon Publications	
2025	Nathan Ballingrud	Crypt of the Moon Spider	Nightfire Books/Titan UK	
2025	Michael R. Fletcher	"In the Shadow of Their Dying"	Grimdark Magazine	
2025	Anna Smith Spark	"In the Shadow of Their Dying"	Grimdark Magazine	
2025	Lee Mandelo	The Woods All Black	Tordotcom	
2025	Premee Mohamed	The Butcher of the Forest	Tordotcom/Titan UK	
2026	Eden Royce*	Psychopomp & Circumstance	Tordotcom	
2026	Amal El-Mohtar	The River Has Roots	Tordotcom; Arcadia	
2026	Theodora Goss	"The Secret Diary of Mina Harker"	Letters from an Imaginary Country (Tachyon Publications)	
2026	Thomas Ha	"Uncertain Sons"	Uncertain Sons and Other Stories (Undertow Publications)	
2026	Jordan Kurella	The Death of Mountains	Lethe Press	
2026	Josh Malerman	"The Spotter"	You, Human: An Anthology of Dark Science Fiction, Vol. 2 (Written Backwards)	
2026	Nghi Vo	A Mouthful of Dust	Tordotcom	
