= The Black God's Drums =

2018 novella by P. Djèlí Clark

- Author: P. Djèlí Clark
- Language: English
- Genre: Fantasy, steampunk
- Set in: 1884, New Orleans, Louisiana
- Published: 21 Aug 2018
- Publisher: Tor.com
- Pages: 111 (Paperback)
- ISBN: 9781250294715

The Black God's Drums is a 2018 fantasy novella by P. Djèlí Clark. It is set in an alternate history New Orleans in which the Confederate States of America won the American Civil War and New Orleans is an independent territory. The novella received critical acclaim, being nominated for the 2018 Nebula Award for Best Novella, 2019 Hugo Award for Best Novella, 2019 Locus Award for Best Novella, and 2019 World Fantasy Award for Best Novella. It was awarded a 2019 Alex Award.

== Plot ==
In the world of the novella, the Haitian Slave Revolt freed Haiti as well as many Caribbean nations, now called the Free Isles. The Haitians used a powerful weapon called the Black God's Drums to defeat the French fleet. Also known as Shango's Thunder, the Drums create powerful storms. Their collateral damage is so high that they have only been used once. The Confederate States of America have fought to a draw with the Union, and New Orleans is now neutral territory. Additionally, the Confederacy uses drapeto, a psychoactive gas, to control their enslaved population.

Creeper is a street urchin born in New Orleans during a storm, giving her a special connection to Oya, the orisha of storms. When Creeper is thirteen, she overhears Confederate soldiers discussing a Haitian scientist and the Black God’s Drums. Creeper decides to sell this information to Captain Ann-Marie St. Augustine of the airship Midnight Robber in exchange for becoming a member of the crew. Ann-Marie has a connection to the goddess Oshun, Oya’s sister.

Oya sends Creeper a vision of a skeleton. A man in a skeletal Mardi Gras mask kidnaps the Haitian scientist, Dr. Duvall, before Ann-Marie and Creeper reach him. Creeper and Ann-Marie meet with Sisters Agnes and Eunice, nuns who provide Creeper with information about the city. They learn that Duvall has been kidnapped by Johnny Boys, a splinter group of Confederate soldiers. The nuns give Ann-Marie and Creeper a flask of drapeto.

Creeper, Ann-Marie, and the crew of Midnight Robber journey into Swamp Ponchartrain, where they find that Duvall and his daughter are being held captive. Duvall is being forced to work for the Johnny Boys under threat that they will sell his daughter into the Confederacy. Using the drapeto and Oya’s powers, Creeper defeats the man in the skeletal mask. The masked man fires Shango’s Thunder before dying. Oya and Ochun work to stop the resulting storm from destroying New Orleans and to protect the crew from the rising waters. Afterwards, Ann-Marie returns to Haiti with Duvall, and Creeper agrees to stay in New Orleans to further her education.

== Major themes ==
Writing for Strange Horizons, Bodhisattva Chattopadhyay stated that New Orleans is a setting "well-suited" to exploring the novella's themes. The novella explores historical trauma, including the Atlantic slave trade and the notion of "legacy". Chattopadhyay writes that the Civil War did not end in the world of the novel, which parallels the increased use of the Confederate flag during the presidency of Donald Trump.

Additionally, the novel's use of "drapeto gas" to control enslaved people evokes both a steampunk aesthetic as well as the theorized illness of drapetomania, invented as an explanation of why enslaved African-Americans fled from their captivity. The drapeto gas also conjures images of "medical experimentation on black bodies" as well as "Jews in the Nazi era". At the end of the novel, Ann-Marie and Creeper subvert these tropes by turning the drapeto gas against their enemies.

== Style ==
Creeper narrates the story in first person. The dialogue is written partly in dialect, including influences from Louisiana Creole, Caribbean English, Cajun, and Southern.

== Reception and awards ==
Publishers Weekly wrote a starred review for the work, praising the "fervent, emotive prose" and calling the story "thrillingly original". Alex Brown from Tor.com gave a positive review to the novella. Brown praised Creeper as a strong protagonist, as well as the author's use of dialogue and the novella's exploration of colonialism and race in the setting of an alternate history. Liz Bourke praised the work's "interesting, complicated" characters, as well as the "vivid" setting. A review in Grimdark Magazine praised the author's descriptions of New Orleans, as well as his combination of folklore from the Caribbean, Africa, and Haiti.

Writing for Strange Horizons, Bodhisattva Chattopadhyay praised the novella for its exploration of complex themes directed toward a young adult audience. Chattopadhyay felt that the novella's characters were well-written, comparing Ann-Marie to Long John Silver from Robert Louis Stevenson's Treasure Island.

Year	Award	Category	Result	Ref.
2018	Nebula Award	Best Novella	Finalist	
2019	Alex Award	—	Won	
2019	Crawford Award	—	Shortlisted	
2019	Hugo Award	Best Novella	Finalist	
2019	Locus Award	Best Novella	Finalist	
2019	World Fantasy Award	Novella	Finalist	
