= Premee Mohamed =

Indo-Caribbean scientist and author

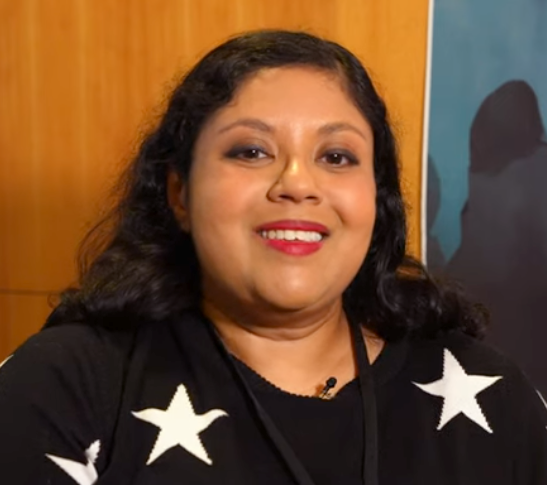
- Mohamed in a 2026 interview.
- Born: Edmonton, Alberta, Canada
- Education: University of Alberta
- Occupations: Writer; scientist
- Writing career
- Language: English
- Years active: 2015–present
- Genres: Fantasy; horror
- Notable works: Beneath the Rising; And What Can We Offer You Tonight; The Butcher of the Forest
- Notable awards: Aurora Award (4); World Fantasy Award (2)
- Website: premeemohamed.com

Premee Mohamed is an Indo-Caribbean scientist and speculative fiction author based in Edmonton, Alberta. Her fiction has won the Nebula Award, Locus Award, World Fantasy Award, and multiple Aurora Awards. She also works as the social media manager and associate editor for Escape Pod.

== Early life and education ==
Premee Mohamed was born in Edmonton, Alberta, Canada. She earned a BSc in molecular genetics from the University of Alberta in 2002. She later went back and earned a second BSc degree in environmental science.

== Career ==
Her first published novel, Beneath the Rising (2020), was written between 2000 and 2002 and was not her first manuscript but the first submitted for publication. She submitted the novel in 2016 after her short story "The Adventurer’s Wife" was accepted for the anthology She Walks in Shadows, published by Innsmouth Free Press in 2015. Since then, Mohamed's short stories have appeared in multiple magazines and anthologies. Beneath the Rising was a finalist for the Aurora Award, British Fantasy Award, Locus Award, and Crawford Award. It is the first in a trilogy.

Her short story "Willing" was nominated for the Pushcart Prize in 2017.

Mohamed's 2021 novella, The Annual Migration of Clouds, won the 2022 Aurora Award for Best Novelette/Novella. It was also a finalist for the Georges Bugnet Award for Fiction and the Robert Kroetsch City of Edmonton Book Prize. The book is the first in a trilogy about a young woman named Reid living in "a post-climate disaster Alberta." The third book in the series, The First Thousand Trees, was a 2025 Canadian Independent Booksellers AssociationBooksellers’ List selection.

Her novel The Siege of Burning Grass was shortlisted for the 2024 Ursula K. Le Guin Prize and named one of the best science fiction books of 2024 by Esquire. Both The Siege of Burning Grass and The Butcher of the Forest won Aurora Awards in 2025.

Mohamed's 2025 collection One Message Remains, consisting four stories set in the same world, was published by Psychopomp. Tobias Carroll at Reactor characterized the collection as "very different from Mohamed’s bibliography thus far, but it shares with them a set of memorable characters and a reckoning with some of the grandest ethical questions out there." The book was a finalist for both the Aurora Award and Locus Award. The collection was shortlisted for the 2026 Ursula K. Le Guin Prize.

Her fifth novel, Wickhills, about a secret agent in a magical city, was published by Tor Books in September 2026. It received a starred review from Library Journal: "This gas-lamp urban fantasy combines an exciting adventure, a walk through dangerous, secret places, and one man’s crisis. The pace is relentless, the characters are unreliable at every turn, and the stakes are high with every step."

In October 2026, Mohamed released From The Library of Jurgen Leitner, a gothic horror novel based on the popular podcast drama The Magnus Archives, with Jonathan Sims, published by Random House Worlds.

== Bibliography ==
=== Novels ===
==== Beneath the Rising trilogy ====
- Beneath the Rising. Solaris Books. 2020. ISBN 9781781087862.
- A Broken Darkness. Solaris Books. 2021. ISBN 9781781088753.
- The Void Ascendant. Solaris Books. 2022. ISBN 9781786185204.

==== Standalone ====
- The Siege of Burning Grass. Solaris Books. 2024. ISBN 9781837861835.
- Wickhills. Tor Books. 2026. ISBN 9781250378415.

==== The Magnus Archives ====
- From the Library of Jurgen Leitner. with Jonathan Sims. Random House Worlds. 2026. ISBN 9798217092635.

=== Novellas ===
==== Standalone ====
- These Lifeless Things. Solaris Books/Penguin Audio. 2021. ASIN B08VWPXMW8. (Note: These Lifeless Things is part of the Solaris Satellites series, where each novella is by a different author.)
- And What Can We Offer You Tonight. Neon Hemlock Press. 2021. ISBN 9781952086250.
- The Butcher of the Forest. Titan Books. 2024. ISBN 9781803368726.

==== The Annual Migration of Clouds series ====
- The Annual Migration of Clouds. ECW Press. 2021. ISBN 9781770415935.
- We Speak Through the Mountain. ECW Press. 2024. ISBN 9781770417335.
- The First Thousand Trees. ECW Press. 2025. ISBN 9781770417342.

=== Novelettes ===
- "By Salt, by Sea, by Light of Stars". 2024. Strange Horizons.

=== Anthologies ===
- Silvia Moreno-Garcia; Paula R. Stiles, eds. (2015). "The Adventurer's Wife". She Walks in Shadows. Innsmouth Free Press. ISBN 9781927990162.
- Alex Woodroe, ed. (2024). "Quietus". Brave New Weird: The Best New Weird Horror, Volume Two. Tenebrous Press. ISBN 9781959790068.
- Christopher Golden; Brian Keene, eds. (2025). "Hunted to Extinction". The End of the World as We Know It, New Tales of Stephen King's The Stand. Gallery Books. ISBN 9781668057551.

=== Collections ===
- No One Will Come Back for Us and Other Stories. Undertow Publications. 2023. ISBN 9781988964423.
- One Message Remains. Psychopomp. 2025. ISBN 9798891160101.

== Awards ==
Year	Work	Award	Category	Result	Ref.
2021	Beneath the Rising	Aurora Award	Novel	Nominated	
2021	Beneath the Rising	British Fantasy Award	Horror Novel	Shortlisted	
2021	Beneath the Rising	Crawford Award	—	Finalist	
2021	Beneath the Rising	Locus Award	First Novel	Finalist	
2021	And What Can We Offer You Tonight	Nebula Award	Novella	Won	
2022	And What Can We Offer You Tonight	World Fantasy Award	Novella	Won	
2022	The Annual Migration of Clouds	Aurora Award	Novelette/Novella	Won	
2022	A Broken Darkness	Aurora Award	Novel	Nominated	
2022	A Broken Darkness	British Fantasy Award	Horror Novel	Shortlisted	
2022	A Broken Darkness	Locus Award	Horror Novel	Finalist	
2022	These Lifeless Things	Aurora Award	Novelette/Novella	Nominated	
2022	These Lifeless Things	British Fantasy Award	Novella	Shortlisted	
2023	The Void Ascendant	Aurora Award	Novel	Nominated	
2023	No One Will Come Back for Us	BSFA Award	Collection	Shortlisted	
2024	No One Will Come Back for Us	Aurora Award	Related Work	Nominated	
2024	No One Will Come Back for Us	British Fantasy Award	Collection	Shortlisted	
2024	No One Will Come Back for Us	Ignyte Award	Anthology/Collected Works	Won	
2024	No One Will Come Back for Us	Locus Award	Collection	Finalist	
2024	No One Will Come Back for Us	World Fantasy Award	Collection	Won	
2024	"At Every Door a Ghost"	Aurora Award	Short Fiction	Won	
2024	"At Every Door a Ghost"	Locus Award	Short Story	Finalist	
2024	The Siege of Burning Grass	Ursula K. Le Guin Prize	—	Shortlisted	
2024	The Butcher of the Forest	Nebula Award	Novella	Nominated	
2025	The Butcher of the Forest	Aurora Award	Novelette/Novella	Won	
2025	The Butcher of the Forest	Hugo Award	Novella	Finalist	
2025	The Butcher of the Forest	Ignyte Award	Novella	Finalist	
2025	The Butcher of the Forest	Locus Award	Novella	Finalist	
2025	The Butcher of the Forest	World Fantasy Award	Novella	Nominated	
2025	The Siege of Burning Grass	Aurora Award	Novel	Won	
2025	The Siege of Burning Grass	Locus Award	Fantasy Novel	Finalist	
2025	"By Salt, by Sea, by Light of Stars"	Hugo Award	Novelette	Finalist	
2025	"By Salt, by Sea, by Light of Stars"	Locus Award	Novelette	Won	
2025	"The Night Birds"	Locus Award	Short Story	Finalist	
2026	The First Thousand Trees	Aurora Award	Novella/Novellette	Nominated	
2026	"Hunted To Extinction"	Aurora Award	Short Fiction	Nominated	
2026	One Message Remains	Aurora Award	Related Work	Nominated	
2026	One Message Remains	Locus Award	Collection	Finalist	
2026	One Message Remains	Ursula K. Le Guin Prize	—	Finalist	
