= Near Zennor =

2011 weird fiction novella by Elizabeth Hand

"Near Zennor" is a 2011 weird fiction novella by Elizabeth Hand. It was first published in the anthology A Book of Horrors.

== Synopsis ==
In the aftermath of his wife's death, Jeffrey discovers that decades earlier, when she was a teenage girl visiting Cornwall, something happened to her — something involving fantasy novels. He then visits Cornwall himself in hopes of learning more.

== Reception ==
"Near Zennor" won the Shirley Jackson Award for Best Novella of 2011, and was a finalist for the 2012 World Fantasy Award—Novella and the 2012 British Fantasy Award for best novella.

Publishers Weekly called it "haunting".

In the Los Angeles Review of Books, Rob Latham described it as "gorgeously strange" and "a virtual compendium of Hand's characteristic themes", with Jeffrey serving as "yet another entry in her compelling gallery of rueful isolates struggling to fill a psychic void (...) [and] find[ing] ambiguous solace in the lingering legacy of the 1960s, in the vaguely tainted but still potent mythographies of a tatterdemalion counterculture."

Strange Horizons was less favorable, saying that the "story never quite achieves the affect of its inspirations", and that the "snippets of the novel-within-the-story that Jeffrey reads end up being more compelling than the slightly run-of-the-mill story itself".

== Origins ==
Hand has stated that the story is "a straightforward homage to Robert Aickman," and declined to explain the events that Jeffrey sees, saying "What exactly happens in "Near Zennor" (...)? You tell me."
