= The River Has Roots =

2025 fantasy novella by Amal El-Mohtar

- Author: Amal El-Mohtar
- Language: English
- Genre: Fantasy
- Publisher: Tordotcom
- Publication date: 4 Mar 2025
- Publication place: Canada
- Pages: 144
- ISBN: 9781250341082

The River Has Roots is a 2025 novella by Amal El-Mohtar. The book is El-Mohtar's standalone authorial debut; she previously coauthored the 2019 novella This is How You Lose the Time War with Max Gladstone. It received critical acclaim, winning the Aurora Award for Best Novelette/Novella, Hugo Award for Best Novella, Locus Award for Best Novella, and Nebula Award for Best Novella.

== Plot ==
The River Liss flows out of Arcadia, or Faerie, into the town of Thistleford. The Hawthorn family tends the magical willow trees that grow along its banks. Sisters Esther and Ysabel fulfill the family tradition of singing to the willow trees each morning.

Esther is courted by a local man named Samuel Pollard, but she is not attracted to him. A fairy named Rin hears her singing in the forest. The two are attracted to each other; they discuss gifts and exchanges. Esther courts Rin, who eventually agrees to marry her.

A jealous Pollard pushes Esther into the River Liss. He hopes to court Ysabel instead. Esther is transformed into a swan due to the magic of the river. She is rescued by Agnes Crow, a local witch. Using the power of songs, Agnes and Rin return Esther to human form. Rin reveals that Esther died from drowning, but her spirit remained connected to Arcadia. She can choose to remain with Rin forever as a woman, but can never return to Thistleford in human form. In order to protect her sister from Pollard, she devises a plan to communicate with Ysabel. She asks Rin to turn her into a harp.

Rin travels from Arcadia to Thistleford, disguised as a harpist. They arrive at a celebration of Ysabel's engagement to Pollard. In Esther's voice, the harp sings a murder ballad accusing Pollard of drowning her and demanding vengeance. Esther and Ysabel sing their secret song, which only the two of them knew; this confirms that the harp's story is true. Pollard is forced to drink from the River Liss and is turned into a willow.

Rin returns to Arcadia with the harp, and Esther regains her human shape. Years later, Ysabel and her child visit them in Arcadia.

== Background ==
According to Sarah Shaffi of Vogue Arabia, the book was inspired by El-Mohtar's relationship with her younger sister. The story also retells the folk song The Bonny Swans as performed by Loreena McKennitt, which El-Mohtar first heard as a teenager. In the song, one sister drowns the other; the drowned sister turns into a musical instrument to expose her murderer. The novella also draws on El-Mohtar's memories of Lebanon as a child; the author states "... if I think of children in Lebanon today, that is not the experience they’re having. They’re being displaced, they’re being terrorized, they’re being traumatized." The characters of Ysabel and Esther sing the Palestinian resistance song Tarweedeh Shmaali ("Lover’s Hymn") in one scene of the story.

== Publication history ==
The novella also includes the short story "John Hollowback and the Witch," which is included as a preview of an upcoming short story collection by El-Mohtar.

== Reception and awards ==
Kirkus Reviews gave the novel a starred review, praising El-Mohtar's "blend of poetry and prose." The review notes that the ending is perhaps too neat, but concludes "you’ll want to revisit [the novel] like a favorite song, especially once you know the words to sing along." Publishers Weekly wrote that "though the abstract magic system, dubbed "grammar," proves difficult to grasp, El-Mohtar's ethereal prose paints a clear picture of the unbreakable bond between her worthy heroines. Readers will be captivated." Lisa Tuttle of The Guardian praised the book, calling it a "pitch-perfect story of love and sacrifice, yearning and discovery, like a classic folk tale, but freshly minted."

Liz Bourke of Locus praised the novella, calling it "a fairy tale, set on the borders of Faerie, drenched in folksongs." Bourke praised El-Mohtar's use of language, stating that the author "s a fantastic prose stylist, with an ear for poetry and a very apt sense for rhythm and metaphor, more inclined to the understated than the overblown. Language and character come alive in this novella, and the setting is – like a good folktale, like a ballad – at once recognisably familiar and yet still strange." Bourke concluded that the novella would likely earn many awards nominations during the upcoming year. Also writing for Locus, Gary K. Wolfe called it "an absolutely lovely take on classic murder ballads". Wolfe stated that "Much of the charm of The River Has Roots derives from El-Mohtar’s generous deployment of folk materials such as riddles and excerpts from actual traditional songs like I Gave My Love a Cherry and The Light Dragoon, but what is more impressive is the seamless way El-Mohtar blends the lyricism of her own prose with that of her source materials." Alex Brown of Reactor stated that "it reads like a fairy tale that is both true and legendary at the same time." Brown further described the book as "so goddamn good that I know whatever I write about it will never adequately convey how much you need to drop everything and read this book right now..."

| Year | Award | Category | Result | Ref. |
|---|---|---|---|---|
| 2025 | BSFA Award | Shorter Fiction | Shortlisted | |
| 2025 | Nebula Award | Novella | Won | |
| 2026 | Aurora Award | Novelette/Novella | Won | |
| 2026 | British Fantasy Award | Novella | Won | |
| 2026 | Hugo Award | Novella | Won | |
| 2026 | Ignyte Award | Novella | Won | |
| 2026 | Locus Award | Novella | Won | |
| 2026 | World Fantasy Award | Long Fiction | Shortlisted | |
| 2026 | Premio Ignotus | Foreign Short Fiction | Won | |
