= The West Passage =

2024 fantasy novel by Jared Pecaček

- Author: Jared Pechaček
- Language: English
- Genre: Fantasy
- Publisher: Tor Books
- Publication date: July 16, 2024
- Pages: 384
- Awards: Crawford Award (2025)
- ISBN: 9781250323743

The West Passage is the 2024 debut fantasy novel written by Jared Pechaček, published by Tor Books.

== Plot ==
The book follows Kew and Pell, two members of the Grey Tower, one of five towers set in the city-like megastructure known only as the Palace.

== Awards and reception ==
The novel received the 2025 Crawford Award. It received a starred review from Kirkus Reviews and was shortlisted for the 2025 Ursula K. Le Guin Prize.

"This is a vividly depicted, decidedly peculiar world governed by an inexplicable logic... Its fablelike but off-kilter qualities and architectural setting will likely appeal to fans of Susanna Clarke’s Piranesi, Angélica Gorodischer’s Kalpa Imperial, and Josiah Bancroft’s Books of Babel series." — Kirkus Reviews, review of The West Passage

The book was a finalist for the 2025 Locus Award for Best First Novel. It was a finalist for the 2025 Washington State Book Award.

In Jake Casella Brookins’ review at Locus Magazine, he noted: "The world of this book is an astonishing delight; each section is new and surprising, but there’s a depth and a completeness to surroundings that is spellbinding. Giant architectural whimsy, here falling into ruin, there still bustling with activity, elsewhere echoing with ancient secrets and magic: It’s a perpetually engaging romp."
