= A Taste of Honey (novella) =

2016 fantasy novella by Kai Ashante Wilson

- Author: Kai Ashante Wilson
- Cover artist: Tommy Arnold
- Genre: Fantasy, Romance
- Publisher: Tor.com
- Publication date: 25 October 2016
- Pages: 136
- ISBN: 978-0765390042

A Taste of Honey is a 2016 LGBT fantasy romantic novella by Kai Ashante Wilson. It is set in the same universe as his previous novella, The Sorcerer of the Wildeeps. It centers upon the forbidden relationship between an Olorumi royal and a Daluçan peace envoy.

== Plot summary ==
The story is told out of chronological order.

Aqib, a distant relative of the royal family of Olorum, is the assistant keeper of the royal Menagerie. He meets Lucrio, an ambassador from the Daluçan kingdom. An attraction develops between then, despite an Olorumi prohibition against same-sex relationships. Ten days later, Lucrio boards a ship to return to his homeland with his new Olorumi wife. Aqib attempts to swim out to the ship, but is dragged back to shore by his brother, the Corporal.

Aqib and Lucrio make love on the night after they meet; they continue to have nightly trysts for the duration of Lucrio's stay. Three days after Lucrio leaves, the princess Femysade chooses Aqib as her husband; they marry and have a daughter, Lucretia. Aqib is summoned to a meeting with two Olorumi deities, who grant him the ability to communicate with animals. Femysade leaves her family to live with the gods.

In the Royal Menagerie, Lucrio asks Aqib to leave Olorum with him. Torn between love for Lucrio and loyalty to his family and religion, Aqib declines. Later that night, he regrets this choice and attempts to leave, but is prevented by his father and the Corporal. Due to Femysade's jealousy, the gods erase all memories of Lucrio from Aqib's mind. At the age of 89, Aqib dies.

It is revealed that Aqib actually chose to leave the Menagerie with Lucrio. For decades, he wondered if he had made the correct choice. Once per lifetime, a Sibylline Oracle allows supplicants to ask for one miracle. The Oracle offered Aqib the chance to live another life as if he had stayed in Olorum. In return for this vision, Aqib dips his hand into a jar of honey, and the Oracle consumes it. Aqib realizes that he made the correct choice. Despite the fact that Lucretia does not exist, he and Lucrio have made their own family in Daluz. Aqib realizes that he can now understand the language of animals, just as he did in his vision of another life.

== Awards and reception ==
A Taste of Honey has received positive reviews from fantasy authors such as N. K. Jemisin, as well as positive reviews in The Washington Post, the Chicago Tribune, and Booklist. The story received praise for its unconventional plot structure.

Awards and honors
Year	Award	Category	Result	Ref.
2016	Nebula Award	Novella	Nominated	
2017	Hugo Award	Novella	Finalist	
2017	Locus Award	Novella	Finalist	
2017	Theodore Sturgeon Award	—	Finalist	
2017	World Fantasy Award	Long Fiction	Nominated	
