= Greer Gilman =

American author of fantasy stories (born 1951)

- Born: Greer Ilene Gilman; 1951 (age 74–75)
- Education: University of Cambridge
- Occupation: Writer
- Writing career
- Genre: fantasy
- Notable awards: Crawford Award (1991), World Fantasy Award (2004), James Tiptree Jr. Award (2009)
- Website: www.greergilman.com

Greer Ilene Gilman (born 1951) is an American author of fantasy stories.

== Biography ==
She was educated at Wellesley College and the University of Cambridge, where she studied on a Vida Dutton Scudder Fellowship. Her stories are noted for their dense prose style, which is strongly focused on native English roots, sometimes reminiscent of Gerard Manley Hopkins. Her characteristic themes are drawn from a mixture of North English and Scottish ballads and seasonal rituals, which she uses to create a complex mythology centered on the seasons and constellations of her fictional world of Cloud.

Her novel Moonwise, in which two women travel in a world they have created, won the Crawford Award for 1991. Her collection of three stories, Cloud & Ashes: Three Winter's Tales won the Tiptree Award in 2009, and has been shortlisted for the Mythopoeic Award in 2010. Both are published by Small Beer Press. The novella "A Crowd of Bone" published in Trampoline: an anthology won the 2004 World Fantasy Awards. Her work has also been published in Salon Fantastique, The Faces of Fantasy, and Mythic Delirium. Her essay, "Girl, Implicated: The Child in the Labyrinth in the Fantastic" appeared in the Journal of the Fantastic in the Arts, vol.19 no. 2. Her chapter on "The Languages of the Fantastic" appears in the Cambridge Companion to Fantasy Literature.
