= The Butcher of the Forest =

2024 dark fantasy novella by Premee Mohamed

- Author: Premee Mohamed
- Language: English
- Genre: Dark fantasy
- Publisher: Tordotcom; Titan Books
- Publication date: 27 Feb 2024
- Pages: 144 (Hardcover)
- Awards: 2025 Aurora Award for Best Novelette/Novella
- ISBN: 978-1-250-88178-6

The Butcher of the Forest is a 2024 dark fantasy novella by Indo-Caribbean scientist and author Premee Mohamed. It was first published by Tordotcom.

The novella was listed as one of "The Best Books of 2024" by NPR.

== Synopsis ==
Veris Thorn is brought to the castle of the Tyrant. The latter rules her land. The former is the only person known to have ever rescued a child from a cursed wood called the Elmever. The Tyrant orders Veris to rescue his two children, Eleonor and Aram, from the woods; if she fails, he will destroy her village and kill all of its inhabitants.

Veris enters the woods, knowing that she has only a single day to rescue the children before they are lost forever. She uses a set of magical trinkets to find her way through the forest. She bargains with an antlered creature, offering him food in exchange for the location of the lost children. The creature leads Veris to a cottage, advising her to make no sound to disturb the guardians. Veris sees that the cottage is guarded by undead animals. She trips and lets out an involuntary squeak, attracting the notice of the guardians. She is injured by a skeletal deer, but manages to enter the cottage and slam the door shut behind her.

The house seems to defy the normal laws of physics. Veris explores several rooms, eventually finding a lake that is surrounded by trees. She sees a row of cages on the beach; the final cage contains two huddled children. A guardian emerges from the trees. Veris trades four years from her lifespan in exchange for the children. Veris, Eleonor, and Aram flee into the woods. They are pursued and by a unicorn; the beast claims that it had purchased the children first. Veris leads the unicorn into a trap, where it is eaten by another monster.

Veris and the children find a table set for a banquet. Veris warns them not to eat or drink anything they see. A fox spirit appears to tempt them into partaking of the feast. The fox tricks Aram into agreeing to play a game. The fox spirit and Veris play two rounds of dice, each winning once. The fox offers to show them the way out of the Elmever; in exchange, it asks to eat Veris’s worst memory. Veris recounts the death of her mother during the Tyrant’s war of conquest. Her father fell into a deep depression. At the age of twelve, Veris was forced to engage in sex work for food. Veris’s father eventually starved to death.

Veris and the children are guided from the forest, but a flash flood begins. They fall into a rushing river. They are pulled from the water by the Lord of the Elmever. The Lord accuses Veris of dishonesty: she did not give her worst memory to the fox spirit as she had promised. As recompense, he takes Aram, but allows Veris and Eleonor to return to the moral world.

Veris brings Eleonor back to her father. Eleonor begs for clemency, but the Tyrant plans to execute Veris anyway. Veris confesses that she lied to the fox spirit intentionally. The true worst memory of her life was the death of her own daughter, Ingrid: she was the child that Veris previously rescued from the Elmever. After rescuing Ingrid, the child became ill and died, rendering Veris's rescue pointless in the end. After hearing this story, the Tyrant dismisses Veris.

Veris convalesces in her family home. Months later, Eleonor visits. She asks Veris to teach her magic so that she can go back into the Elmever and rescue her brother.

== Reception and awards ==
In Locus, Liz Burke called it "compelling and effective" and stated that it is "not horror, not quite", because "hope is never quite denied". Burke praised it as having "layers, and depth, and feeling", and lauded Mohamed's "lucid prose [which] convey[s] more by Veris's reaction to her encounters than by plain description"; however, Burke also found that the parallels Mohamed drew between the "arbitrary powers" of the tyrant, and those of the supernatural entities within the Elmever, were "perhaps a little heavy-handed."

Gary K. Wolfe observed that the Tyrant's lack of a name reinforced the story's "archetypal tone", and described Veris as "an increasingly intriguing figure", whose choices regarding the children of the man who murdered her family give the narrative a "surprisingly rich and complex texture."

James Nicoll called the novella "very efficient" and "an entertaining sequence of increasing disquieting encounters, accompanied by increasingly tragic revelations", and declared that although it "is not long", it is "as long as it needs to be." Publishers Weekly, conversely, faulted it for its "page count [which] doesn't leave much room for character development", but nonetheless conceded that "it's easy to buy into the high stakes" and that "readers will be rapt".

Writing in Strange Horizons, Dan Hartland stated that "compared with [the Tyrant's] throne room, the woods and its denizens seem so… manageable", and noted the novella's unusual structure, such that "it begins with its most considered scene, its most fully imagined setting; its exploration of the forest is attenuated and withheld; and its quest [the discovery of the children and their liberation from the forest's magic] is complete by its halfway point". Hartland considered that fatalism is a central theme of the novella, in that even if Veris is able to retrieve the children from the forest, this "isn't any sort of freedom".

Year	Award	Category	Result	Ref.
2024	Nebula Award	Novella	Nominated	
2025	Aurora Award	Novelette/Novella	Won	
2025	Hugo Award	Novella	Finalist	
2025	Ignyte Award	Novella	Finalist	
2025	Locus Award	Novella	Finalist	
2025	World Fantasy Award	Novella	Nominated	

== Inspiration ==
Mohamed has said that the novella was the result of her having dreamed of "the throne room with all the skulls on the stone wall, and then someone saying something about how the children were innocent of the sins of their father".
