= No One Will Come Back for Us and Other Stories =

2023 short fiction collection by Premee Mohamed

No One Will Come Back For Us and Other Stories
- Author: Premee Mohamed
- Language: English
- Genre: Horror fiction; speculative fiction
- Published: 16 May 2023
- Publisher: Undertow Publications
- Publication place: Canada
- Pages: 294 (Paperback)
- Awards: 2024 Ignyte Award for Outstanding Anthology/Collected Works; 2024 World Fantasy Award—Collection
- ISBN: 9781988964423

No One Will Come Back for Us and Other Stories is a 2023 short fiction collection by Premee Mohamed. It received critical attention, winning an Ignyte Award and World Fantasy Award. It was a finalist for several other literary awards.

== Contents ==
The collection includes seventeen short stories all written by Mohamed.

== Reception and awards ==
Publishers Weekly called the book "dark, strange, and wonderfully wild." The review praised Mohamed's skill at creating human connection despite the outlandish premises of some of the stories. It commented on several stories individually, noting that the whole collection is "by turns brutal and tender, terrifying and sweet... The result will both terrify and delight." The review recommended the book for fans of Caitlin Starling and Rivers Solomon.

Gabino Iglesias of Locus called the collection "dark, strange, and dazzling," predicting that it would be one of his favorite collections of 2023. Iglesias commented on several stories in particular. The story "Below the Kirk, Below the Hill" features an undead child and sets the tone of horror for the remaining stories in the collection. Iglesias wrote that the collection's two crowning jewels are "The Evaluator" and "For Each of These Miseries." He praised Mohamed's use of Lovecraftian horror elements as a writer of color, concluding that "Mohamed will be showing up in many best of the year lists with this one."

Marion Deeds of fantasyliterature.com gave the book 4.5 stars out of a possible 5. Deeds stated that "every one of these stories is well thought out and beautifully written. It’s a good sampler of Mohamed’s work, or just a chance to consume some shivery, creepy horror." The review particularly praised the short stories "Willing" and "The Adventurer's Wife." The former examines the love of a father for his daughter, combining the realism of hard work on a farm with fantastical elements such as deities and sacrifices. Deeds described the latter story as a pastiche of a "late Victorian/early Edwardian 'weird' adventure story."

Year	Award	Category	Result	Ref.
2023	BSFA Award	Collection	Shortlisted	
2024	Aurora Award	Related Work	Nominated	
2024	British Fantasy Award	Collection	Shortlisted	
2024	Ignyte Award	Anthology/Collected Works	Won	
2024	Locus Award	Collection	Finalist	
2024	World Fantasy Award	Collection	Won	
