= The Sorcerer of the Wildeeps =

2015 science fantasy novella by Kai Ashante Wilson

- Official cover art for The Sorcerer of the Wildeeps
- Author: Kai Ashante Wilson
- Language: English
- Genre: Fantasy literature; science fantasy
- Publisher: Tor.com
- Publication date: 1 September 2015
- Pages: 212
- ISBN: 0765385244

The Sorcerer of the Wildeeps is a 2015 LGBT science fantasy novella, the debut novella by Kai Ashante Wilson. It is set in the same fictional universe as his later novella A Taste of Honey, as well as several of his short stories. It won the 2016 Crawford Award.

== Plot ==
A merchant caravan hires Captain Isa, Sorcerer Demane, and their men to guard them on a journey through the dangerous Wildeeps. The Wildeeps are a forest in which multiple dimensions overlap; only by staying on the Road can travelers be assured of safety. Isa and Demane are both descended from gods, granting them supernatural strength and other powers. They hide both their powers and their romantic relationship from the rest of the convoy. During the journey, the caravan is stalked by a jukiere, a type of magical tiger. Isa and Demane leave the Road to hunt the tiger. Demane kills one tiger while Isa fights another. In an ambiguous ending, it is implied that Demane's missed spear throw kills Isa.

== Background ==
Prior to writing The Sorcerer of the Wildeeps, Wilson had attempted to write "six or seven" novels, but only got through a few chapters each time. He decided to focus on a smaller work that was nevertheless more extensive than his previous short stories. Most of the characters are based on real people. The novella is set in the same universe as his previous short stories Légendaire and Super Bass. A later novella, A Taste of Honey, is also set in the same universe.

The Sorcerer of the Wildeeps was the first novella published by Tor.com Publishing, then a new imprint of Tor.com.

== Reception ==
The novella received positive reviews from critics. Publishers Weekly gave the work a starred review, calling it a "rich, delicately crafted world ... stocked with vibrant characters". They also praised the author's use of various dialects. The book's writing style has been described as a "blend of very fancy literary writing, Martin-esque fantasy prose, and hip-hop slang".

The novella has also been praised for its inclusion of African-American culture in a secondary fantasy world. Wilson's use of African-American Vernacular English, Spanish, and French further serve to further draw contrast with the "traditionally unmarked white middle-class accent (or dialect) of the typical fantasy protagonist".

The novel won the 2016 Crawford Award.
