= High Times in the Low Parliament =

2022 fantasy novella by Kelly Robson

High Times in the Low Parliament is a 2022 fantasy novella by Kelly Robson, who described it as "a lesbian stoner buddy comedy with fairies — about Brexit". It was first published by Tordotcom.

== Synopsis ==
In a Europe without men, Lana Baker is a drug-addled scribe from Aldgate who is tricked into working in the Low Parliament—where, unless a years-long deadlock can be resolved, fairies will flood the site and kill everyone.

== Reception ==
High Times in the Low Parliament was a finalist for the Nebula Award for Best Novella in 2022, the 2023 Locus Award for Best Novella, and the 2023 Aurora Award for Best Novelette/Novella.

Writing in Locus, Gary K. Wolfe lauded it as "delightful" and "demented fun and shrewd satire", with a basic premise that is "goofy", and observed that the three-way relationship between Lana, the fairy Bugbite, and the French delegate Eloquentia "plays out in classic screwball romantic comedy form".

Publishers Weekly commended it as "charming" and "easygoing", but felt that "Robson's argument that parliamentary systems, however flawed, are worth preserving" was "undercut" by the fact that Lana fell asleep during an important debate. Olivia Waite, writing in The New York Times Book Review called it "gallows humor with a light touch".

Library Journal, reviewing the audiobook, noted its "frenetic pace in lieu of expansive worldbuilding", stating that it "leaves readers wanting more". AudioFile praised it as "utterly fun", with "wonderful worldbuilding", and found Lana "delightfully charming, lazy, and witty".
