= M. Rickert =

American writer

Mary Rickert
- Born: December 11, 1959 (age 66); Port Washington, Wisconsin, U.S.
- Occupation: Writer
- Writing career
- Pen name: M. Rickert
- Genres: Science fiction, fantasy

Mary Rickert, known as M. Rickert (born December 11, 1959, in Port Washington, Wisconsin), is an American writer of fantasy fiction. Many of her stories have been published in The Magazine of Fantasy & Science Fiction. Her first collection, Map of Dreams, was published by Golden Gryphon Press in 2006; her second collection, Holiday, appeared in 2010 from the same publisher. She lives in Wisconsin.

Rickert's fiction has won or been nominated for several major awards. "Journey into the Kingdom" was nominated for the 2006 Nebula Award for Best Novelette and an International Horror Guild Award, and won the 2007 World Fantasy Award for Best Short Fiction. Map of Dreams won the 2007 World Fantasy Award for Best Collection and the 2007 Crawford Award, and the collection's title story was nominated for the 2007 World Fantasy Award for Best Novella. Her "Holiday" collection was nominated for a World Fantasy Award in 2011. The short story “The Corpse Painter's Masterpiece” won a Shirley Jackson Award in 2012.

On November 10, 2015, Small Beer Press published Rickert's third collection, You Have Never Been Here, containing selected stories from her first two collections, as well as three new stories, one of them a novella. Both the collection and novella "The Mothers of Voorhisville" were nominated for a World Fantasy Award.

== Bibliography ==
=== Novels ===
- The Memory Garden. Sourcebooks Landmark. 2014. ISBN 978-1402297120.
- The Shipbuilder of Bellfairie. Undertow Publications. 2021. ISBN 978-1988964324.

=== Short fiction ===
Collections

Year	Title	Identifiers	Publisher	Notes
2006	Map of Dreams	ISBN 1930846444	Golden Gryphon Press	Contents: "Map of Dreams", "Dreams: Dreaming of the Sun", "Leda", "Cold Fires", "Angel Face", "Night Blossoms", "Nightmares: Feeding the Beast", "Bread and Bombs", "Art Is Not a Violent Subject", "Anyway", "A Very Little Madness Goes a Long Way", "Waking: What I Saw, When I Looked", "The Girl Who Ate Butterflies", "Many Voices", "More Beautiful Than You", "Peace on Suburbia", "Rising: Flight", "Moorina of the Seals", "The Harrowing", "The Super Hero Saves the World", "The Chambered Fruit"
2010	Holiday	ISBN 1930846657	Golden Gryphon Press	Contents: "Holiday", "Memoir of a Deer Woman", "Journey into the Kingdom", "The Machine", "Evidence of Love in a Case of Abandonment: One Daughter's Personal Account", "Don't Ask", "Traitor", "Was She Wicked? Was She Good?", "You Have Never Been Here", "War is Beautiful", "The Christmas Witch"
2015	You Have Never Been Here	ISBN 978-1618731104	Small Beer Press	Contents: "Memoir of a Deer Woman", "Journey into the Kingdom", "The Shipbuilder", "Cold Fires", "The Corpse Painter's Masterpiece", "The Christmas Witch", "Holiday", "The Chambered Fruit", "The Mothers of Voorhisville", "You Have Never Been Here"

List of stories

Title	Year	First published	Reprinted/collected	Notes
"The Girl Who Ate Butterflies"	1999	Rickert, M. (Aug 1999). "The Girl Who Ate Butterflies". F&SF. 97 (2): 71–82.	Rickert, M. (2006). Map of Dreams. Golden Gryphon Press.	
"Angel Face"	2000	Rickert, M. (Jul 2000). "Angel Face". F&SF. 99 (1): 50–55.	Rickert, M. (2006). Map of Dreams. Golden Gryphon Press.	
"Moorina"	2001	Rickert, M. (Feb 2001). "Moorina". F&SF. 100 (2): 95–102.		
"Journey into the Kingdom"	2006	Rickert, M. (May 2006). "Journey Into the Kingdom". F&SF. 110 (5): 132–158.		
"Evidence of Love in a Case of Abandonment: One Daughter's Personal Account"	2008	Rickert, M. (October–November 2008). "Evidence of Love In a Case of Abandonment: One Daughter's Personal Account". F&SF. 115 (4&5): 192–200.	Rickert, M. (2006). Map of Dreams. Golden Gryphon Press.	
"Evergreen"	2019	Rickert, M. (November 5, 2019). "Evergreen". F&SF. 137 (11 & 12): 129–135.		
"Another F*cken Fairy Tale"	2020	Rickert, M. (May 5, 2020). "Another F*cken Fairy Tale". F&SF. 138 (5 & 6): 247–255.		
"Last Night at the Fair"	2020	Rickert, M. (July–August 2020). "Last Night at the Fair". F&SF. 139 (1 & 2): 28–34.		

== Awards ==
- 2007 World Fantasy Award for Best Short Story for Journey into the Kingdom
- 2007 World Fantasy Award for Best Collection for Map of Dreams
- 2007 Crawford Award for Map of Dreams
- 2011 Shirley Jackson Award for Best Short Fiction “The Corpse Painter’s Masterpiece”
- 2015 Locus Award for first novel The Memory Garden
