= Veronica Schanoes =

American writer and academic

Veronica L. Schanoes
- Born: United States
- Education: University of Pennsylvania (PhD)
- Occupations: Author; novelist; short story writer; professor
- Writing career
- Language: English
- Genre: fantasy
- Notable work: Burning Girls
- Notable awards: Shirley Jackson Award for Best Novella (2013)

Veronica Schanoes is an American author of fantasy stories and an associate professor in the department of English at Queens College, CUNY. Her fiction has appeared on Tor.com as well as in various anthologies. Her novella Burning Girls was nominated for the Nebula Award and the World Fantasy Award and won the Shirley Jackson Award for Best Novella in 2013. She lives in New York City.

Schanoes earned her doctorate in English literature from the University of Pennsylvania in 2007. Her first scholarly monograph, Fairy Tales, Myth, and Psychoanalytic Theory: Feminism and Re-telling the Tale, was published by Ashgate Publishing in 2014. Her research interests include fairy tales, women's writing, and fantasy, with particular interest in feminist theory and Jewish representation in speculative fiction.

== Bibliography ==
- Fairy Tales, Myth, and Psychoanalytic Theory: Feminism and Re-telling the Tale. Ashgate Press. 2014.
- “Variations on Lovecraftian Themes.” The Mammoth Book of Cthulhu. Ed. Paula Guran. Prime Books. 2015.
- “Cyclops.” Bestiary. Ed. Ellen Datlow. 2015.
- “Ballroom Blitz.” Tor.com. April 1, 2015. http://www.tor.com/2015/04/01/ballroom-blitz-veronica-schanoes/
- “The Permanent Collection.” The Doll Collection. Eds. Ellen Datalow and Terri Windling. New York: Tor Books. 2015.
- “Among the Thorns.” Tor.com. May 7, 2014. http://www.tor.com/stories/2014/05/among-the-thorns-veronica-schanoes
- “Burning Girls.” Tor.com. June 14, 2013. http://www.tor.com/stories/2013/06/burning-girls
- “Phosphorus.” Queen Victoria’s Book of Spells. Eds. Ellen Datlow and Terri Windling. New York: Tor Books, 2013. 203-223.
- “Rats.” Apex Magazine. March 5, 2011. https://www.apex-magazine.com/rats/
