= The Infinity Concerto =

1984 fantasy novel by Greg Bear

- First edition
- Author: Greg Bear
- Cover artist: Kinuko Y. Craft
- Language: English
- Series: Songs of Earth and Power
- Genre: Fiction novel
- Set in: Modern
- Published: 1984
- Publication place: United States
- Media type: Print
- Followed by: Serpent Mage

The Infinity Concerto (ISBN 0712616721) is a 1984 fantasy novel written by Greg Bear. The plot centers around teenager Michael Perrin's search for what is a Song of Power and why some think he can create such a thing. Transported to another realm, he discovers beings known as the "Sidhe" intervened in Coleridge's incomplete poem, "Kubla Khan". They have stopped others from creating Songs of Power and now they are looking at him.

The Infinity Concerto was followed in 1986 by The Serpent Mage.

== Synopsis ==
In 1939, a composer named Arno Waltiri premiered his latest work, Concerto Opus 45: "Infinity". After the concert, another composer, who had been in the audience, filed a lawsuit against Waltiri, claiming that he was no longer able to properly hear or compose music after hearing Waltiri's work. Over the next several months, dozens of people simply disappeared, and the only thing they had in common with one another was that they had been in the audience at that same performance. Waltiri had been inspired to write the concerto by several conversations with a mysterious man named David Clarkham. The Concerto turns out to have been a "Song of Power". Songs of Power, if properly applied by those who understand them, have the power to literally remake the world. Songs of Power can exist in many artistic forms, including music, poetry, dance, art, architecture, and some less obvious creative fields. Clarkham had disappeared after the performance too, but he had left Waltiri a book and the key to his house, which Waltiri had never used.

The book's present story follows the experiences of a 16-year-old young man named Michael Perrin, a would be poet, who lives close to Waltiri and befriends him. Michael meets Waltiri two months before the latter's death, and receives from Waltiri the book and the key. Following the instructions on a piece of paper he found inserted in the book, Michael enters Clarkham's house, which has been vacant for decades and, through a creepy garden and back-alley acting as planar gates, Perrin finds himself in Sidhedark, a world inhabited by a powerful race of beings calling themselves the Sidhe (pronounced "shee"), who are divided into many sub-races (Faers, Umbrals, Riverines, Meteorals, Pelagals, Arborals and Amorphals) of different shapes and magical abilities, and are associated with many ancient human myths about fairy folks. Michael appears at what he learns is the dilapidated house of someone called the "Isomage", who disappeared years ago, and here meets a huge, strange woman named Lamia, who is cursed to grow larger and larger and periodically shed her own skin as does a serpent. Her curse also forces her not to leave the ruined mansion of the Isomage. Michael is already in danger, because by treaty there is only one town where humans are safe from being hunted and killed by the Sidhe: Euterpe, where Lamia hastily sends Michael before anyone finds him.

Humans occasionally find their way to Sidhedark, and those who survive all live in Euterpe, a town in the Pact Lands, which is the only place humans are permitted in Sidhedark, following an ancient war between Sidhe and the Isomage. There Michael is befriended by a former teacher, Savarin, and learns that the humans are barely tolerated by the Sidhe, who detached a small army of riders led by Alyons the Wickmaster to act as wardens of the treaty.

He returns to the Isomage's house to talk to Lamia, asking her how he can get home, and she said that he will need training in order to make his way back to Earth. She orders him to go see the Crane Women, who are a trio of "Breeds" (part human, part Sidhe), who live on the outskirts of another town populated by other Breeds called Halftown. They train him with exercises that seem pointless and incomprehensible, and also provide fragments of lore hinting at a primordial magical war between the humans and the Sidhe that is at the origin of the current distrust among the races and of the general status of both Earth and Sidhedark realms. During his training Michael returns periodically to Euterpe, telling Savarin about things that he has seen and learned. He also learn that humans are persecuted by Alyons and his riders, who just abide to the letter of the treaty, and exploit every loophole to make the lives of the humans as miserable as possible. The people of Euterpe are not allowed to produce music of any kind, for fear they may create some Songs of Power, and they get only very limited supplies of wood and clothing. During winter time, Alyons and his minions rarely come to Euterpe, to avoid addressing any issues caused by the cold weather to the humans.

One night a number of creatures called Riverines and Umbrals raid Halftown and kidnap three of the Breeds who lived there, taking them to serve Adonna, a sort of god of the Sidhe, by bleeding them of magic. They attack and try to take also Michael, but he barely survives because is discarded as being a mere inferior human, unfit for the service to Adonna; the young man makes his way back to the Crane Women.

To provide Michael with a basic way of defense against such attacks the Crane Women intentionally place the young man on a trafficked path used by Meteorals, where he is easily spotted by them. To escape their persecutions Michael is forced to use his training to throw a "shadow" of himself as an illusion that deceived the Meteorals long enough for him to escape.

The Crane Women take him with them on a journey across a desolate area known as "the Blasted Plain", which surrounds the Pact Lands. The Blaster Plains were created by the war between the Isomage and the Sidhe, and are populated with Adonna's failed experiments, magical monsters originally buried underground which were freed by the energies unleashed by the war. Only a magical powder called 'sani' can allow for a safe passage, and further protections are necessary to avoid being lured by the monsters who crave for the souls of the passers-by. In a lush forest joust outside the Blasted Plain, in main part of the Sidhe world, the group meets Biri, a young Sidhe who has been sent to the Crane Women for training as a priest to Adonna. He and Michael come to live in huts close to the Crane Women's shack in Halftown, and share some knowledge about each other's worlds. Meanwhile, Michael reads Clarkham's book that Waltiri gave to him, which is a book of poetry, and tries to write some of his own in the dirt. Sometimes, though, it seems as if he is writing words that aren't his own; he likens this experience to being "tuned into Death's Radio", giving a name to this strange contact, which comes and goes.

Michael finds himself attracted to Helena, a human woman of Euterpe who, prior to his arrival, was the most recent arrival from Earth (a pianist and dancer from New York). He learns from her that it is dangerous for humans to have sex in Sidhedark, because if the woman conceives, as no human souls are available for the baby, the body of the newborn will be occupied by one of Adonna's abortions, who will turn the baby into a monster. Many of such 'Children' are imprisoned in dark pits in a kind of asylum in Euterpe, after having killed their parents or other people. Alyons would be able to get rid of such magical monsters, which the humans are not able to kill, but he sadistically decided to let them live among the other humans. Michael also learns that the humans of Euterpe are secretly working on a plan to rebel and escape from the Pact Lands into the rest of Sidhedark, where they hope to find a place to live free of Sidhe control. Meanwhile, a Breed woman of Halftown named Eleuth is attracted to Michael, and it doesn't bother her that he is in love with Helena, because Sidhe men apparently don't fall in love, although the women do. Michael, while appreciating Eleuth's attentions, is not in love with her. Eleuth lost her job at the local warehouse following the kidnapping of her father Lirg during the Umbrals' raid and, albeit being only one-quarter of Sidhe blood, started practicing Sidhe's magic in the attempt to better her lot. The Sidhe are possibly more disrespectful toward Breeds than they are towards humans, except for those possessing magical abilities, like the Crane Women.

In the meantime, also Michael's inner powers increase thanks to the Crane Women training, and he becomes able to generate heat and warm from inside and to hide his thoughts and memories from external scrutinies, becoming able to perform a superficial screening of the aura of the other beings. He also learned that the Isomage was a human very gifted in magic who reached Sidhedark from Earth centuries before and appealed to the humans there, stating that he was able to bring all of them back home and free from Sidhe abuses. This sparked the war with the Sidhe, which ended into a stalemate as the Isomage faction was defeated and exiled in a far-away corner of Sidhedark, but the Sidhe were afraid of the magic curses the Isomage hid in the lands, so established the creation of Euterpe and Halftown as relatively safe havens for the humans and the Breeds.

One night Eleuth accedes to Michael's request and tries to send Michael home to Earth, believing that she has learned enough magic to do so, but only manages to send him as far as the gateway within the Isomage's house. Michael no longer has the key, though, and cannot unlock the gate, and Lamia's monstrous sister nearly captures him, but Eleuth sacrifices her life to save him. At the same time, the humans in Euterpe stage their rebellion, and the Sidhe retaliate violently. Michael returns to Lamia's house and rushes to try to help his people, but ends up being pursued by Alyons into a circle of stone teeth at the outskirts of Euterpe, where one of the Isomage's leftover magical traps goes off and kills Alyons, allowing Michael to escape.

Now that he has killed a Sidhe, the Crane Women know that his race will not stop until they catch Michael, so they give him what they can, advices on how to access the inner knowledge of unshielded people, how to shed parts of his personality he does not want anymore and how to get some kind of extracorporeal vision. Then the Crane Women disappear, leaving Michael to fend off by himself in his quest to find the Isomage, the only one that perhaps could help the humans trapped in Sidhedark - including Michael - to come back to Earth.

Michael crosses the Blasted Plane on foot and without protective 'sani' powder, evading the monsters there only by means of using the training the Crane Women gave him. After he crosses, a shadow of Alyons comes to him and tells Michael that since Michael killed him, he must now accept Alyons' horse. Michael argues that he didn't kill Alyons; a trap set by the Isomage did, but it is to no avail; as a matter of honor he must accept the horse. So he does, and the horse makes his travel quicker.

He comes to a golden valley where there is a beautiful palace, inhabited by a man named Lin Piao Tai. It turns out that he is a Spryggla, neither human nor Sidhe, one of the few remaining of the many races that existed long ago, before the Human Sidhe war. The Spryggla were skilled architects. Lin Piao tells Michael a lot about the past, and how first the Sidhe, then the human factions lost in the ancestral magical war, the former losing their souls, the latter being turned into mice, being forced to gain back their original shapes and intelligence over the eons. Following the war the Sidhe left Earth for the stars, only to fight strange and perplexing wars with the alien intelligence they found here. When the battered Sidhe survivors returned to Earth, they found humans back in their original shape but at a primitive state of development. For a time they established their rule over the humans, leading to the first Breeds to be born - among them the Crane Women - but then most of them left when Adonna, their most powerful mage, created the extradimensional world of Sidhedark for them.

Lin Piao is very excited that Michael has a book containing the poem "Kubla Khan", because it is the first part of a Song of Power, and that a Sidhe faction had him build another part of the same Song architecturally on Earth for the mongol leader himself. The valley that Lin Piao Tai lives in is also his prison, however, due to his failure to properly deliver the song to the Khan, and Michael begins to suspect that Lin Piao won't let him leave either. Moreover, the Sidhe have crippled Lin Piao Tai's magic with a weakness: the color blue is his undoing, and a blue flower that Michael had earlier pressed into the book falls out from between the pages, setting off a magical chain reaction that destroys the Spryggla's creations and turns him to stone.

Michael travels onward and meets a human man named Nikolai, who has been living in a forest as a hunter. He was originally a dancer, and was pulled into the Sidhe world just as the Isomage's war was ending. He is welcome in the Sidhe city of Inyas Trai, however, and he takes Michael there. Michael meets the Ban of Hours, a powerful Sidhe woman who tries to protect him, but not far from the city is the Irall, the Temple of Adonna, whose priests would certainly punish Michael for Alyons' death if they caught him. Nikolai takes Michael to see a rare phenomenon known as the Snow Faces that occurs in the nearby mountains, where he meets some other pilgrims who have also come to see it. As they are returning to Inyas Trai, some of Adona's Sidhe followers known as "the Black Order" arrive to arrest Michael and take him to the Irall. Michael is brought before the god Adonna itself, who reveals itself to be Tonn, ancient Mage of the Sidhe, though most have forgotten this and now simply worship him as the god Adonna. Tonn reveals that he is growing tired and Sidhedark, which he created, will soon crumble and die, along with all within it. The only way to save the Sidhe is for Sidhedark and Earth to be reunited, but for the followers of Adonna, who hate humans, this is a blasphemy that they would never accept, even if Adonna itself told them. So Tonn needs Michael's help, but first he must deal with the Isomage, who has been manipulating Michael from the beginning. Tonn temporarily erases most of Michael's memory of the conversation and sends him back.

Michael, Nikolai and some of the pilgrims decide to go to the Isomage's palace, but on the way, Michael meets Biri again. He says that he has failed in his training to become part of the Maln, the Black Order, and now despises them. He attempts to teach Michael more about how Sidhe do magic, taking a bitter, solipsistic approach, claiming that to do magic one must emotionally isolate oneself from all love and companionship. Biri leaves Michael to contemplate this. As the group approaches the Isomage's residence, the pilgrims reveal that they are actually retainers in the Isomage's employ, and that they are there to make sure that Michael gets there safely—and that he doesn't change his mind and go elsewhere. Reaching the palace, Michael finds that it is as Lin Piao Tai said: a beautifully-constructed copy of Kubla Khan's palace from the poem. Michael meets the Isomage, who turns out to be David Clarkham, and tells him that Tonn stole the book from him, but Clarkham does not care, he has many copies of the poem along with other works of human literature. Biri is also there; he says that the Isomage represents his best chance for revenge against the Maln.

Clarkham finally reveals what he wants Michael there for: Michael is a poet, and Clarkham is not. He wants Michael to finish the Song of Power. Michael, however, suspects that while Clarkham seems to want to help humans, he really just wants power for himself—he wants to overthrow the Sidhe and set himself up as ruler instead. After discovering some other very unsavory things about Clarkham, he is unwilling to help him obtain ultimate power, but Clarkham threatens Michael with the death of Nikolai and with horrible magical torture for Michael himself if he doesn't cooperate. But suddenly Michael sees the form of the rest of the Song of Power and realizes that it isn't at all what Clarkham thinks it is. Michael writes a poem about the destruction of the great Khan's palace, the inevitable ending of the Song, and Clarkham's palace starts to collapse around them. As it is taking all his power to hold the palace together, Clarkham can't stop Michael and Nikolai from escaping, and Biri reveals that he did not in fact fail in his training and that he has been working for the Maln all along, helping Michael get to the Isomage to destroy him. Clarkham manages to attack Michael magically, but Michael throws a shadow consisting of all of the training that Biri had given him, which absorbs the attack and dies in his place.

Now that Michael had done what Tonn wanted, Tonn gives Michael what he wants: passage back home. Michael falls through the portal that Tonn creates and finds himself just down the street from Clarkham's house, but five years have passed on Earth in what had seemed like only about five months to Michael. His parents are happy that he is alive but upset that he hadn't told them where he'd gone, and they are astonished about how much he has changed. Michael finds a letter from Arno Waltiri's wife Golda, who had died about two weeks after her husband, leaving all of their assets to him but also giving him the responsibility of editing and publishing all of Waltiri's compositions. But meanwhile, Michael knows that Sidhedark is still collapsing and that the being who was Waltiri is most certainly not dead. He may be home, but his troubles are far from over.

== Settings ==
The book begins and ends in the human world existing in the 1980s when the book was published in southern California, but most of the story takes place in the alternate world of Sidhedark.

=== Sidhedark ===
Sidhedark is a place where the physical laws are different from that known to humans, such as humans not needing to sleep although many do so out of habit, yet they do not dream.

==== Metaphysics ====
Unlike the book's version of Earth, in which humans are unequivocally stated to have souls that live on after death, in Sidhedark humans who die simply cease to exist. Likewise, it is quite bad for humans to give birth to children there, because there are no souls to enter their bodies, so horrible abominations take up residence in them instead.

The god Adonna, who created Sidhedark, seems not to have given its world quite as much permanence as the human world has. It is possible for beings with enough knowledge and willpower to cause temporary changes. Some call this "magic", but it is really just a consequence of Adonna's creation not being as stable as some worlds are.

==== Geography ====
No map appears in the book, but it does describe locations: a small corner of Sidhedark is known as the Pact Lands, containing the human town of Euterpe and the Breed town of Halftown, as well as the Isomage's house. The Pact Lands are separated from the rest of Sidhedark by the Blasted Plain.

The Blasted Plain itself is a desert-like landscape punctuated by poisonous pools of viscous liquids. In it dwell a number of Adonna's abortions—failed creations that live out their twisted existences in pain or madness; they were originally buried beneath the ground, but the magical war that created the Plain freed them. To cross the Plain requires either some form of talisman to repel the abortions or a Sidhe horse, fast enough to outrun them and wise enough to sense and avoid them.

The rest of the Realm contains areas such as:

- Konhem, "the deepest, darkest forest in the Realm"
- Nebchat Lem, "a lake, almost a sea, very deep"
- Chebal Malen, the Black Mountains
- The Sklassa, the fortress of the Black Order
- The Irall, the temple of Adonna
- The city of Inyas Trai, a huge city built for the all the Sidhe by the Spryggla, but now mostly inhabited by Sidhe women only
- Heba Mish, the mountain where the Snow Faces appear

In the lands south-east to the Blasted Plain a major river flows to the north-east for hundreds of miles, crossing in sequence a large forest, the golden prison-valley of Lin Piao, a savannah, the city of Iniyas Trai until reaching the palace of the Isomage, which stands close to the ocean. The Sklassa, the Irall and the Heba Mish are all close to Inyas Trai, while the Konhem and the Nebchat Lem are to the north of the Blasted Plain.

==== History ====
Tens of millions of years ago, there was but one world inhabited by 30 races, including the humans, the Sidhe, the Cledar, the Spryggla, and the Urges. Those races were born out of elementary vibrations of the void, slowly acquiring complexity and intelligence. They created the world they lived on, Earth. Humans were skilled at the magic of life, Cledar at songs of power, Urges at world-building, and Spryggla at constructions. Humans and Urges created the first animals, while the first walls, building and cities were created by the Spryggla. Nature itself was tamed and the laws upon which the Earth was built granted a satisfying and prosperous life for everybody. Nevertheless, despite their immense powers, several among the races were jealous and envious of each other. Over time, four great leaders arose, calling themselves the Mages: Manus of the humans (sometimes called the Serpent Mage), Tonn of the Sidhe, Aum of the Cledar, and Daedal of the Spryggla. There were many lesser mages, however, and they quarreled with each other, these quarrels turning into conflicts and wars. In a world of magic, though, death wasn't forever; wounds could be magically healed and souls resurrected. After centuries of conflict, anyway, more powerful magic were developed to more permanently hurt the enemies, and powerful curses started afflicting the races. Things like lies, diplomacy, fighting spirit and honor were developed at that time, and burdened the intelligent races ever on.

At one point the humans defeated the Sidhe, and Manus, the Serpent Mage of the humans, used his magic to take away the Sidhe's souls. Every other race lived on metaphysically after the death of their bodies, but the Sidhe would no longer do so. However, in the end the Sidhe won, and Tonn, the Mage of the Sidhe, took vengeance upon each of the other races by transforming them into animals: the humans became tiny shrews (apparently their original form was somewhat dragonlike), the Cledar became birds, the Spryggla became whales and dolphins, and the Urges became roaches. Only the humans have recovered from this to any extent, evolving into primates and developing a civilization, and it has taken them tens of millions of years. The Sidhe first fled to the stars, had strange conflicts with other alien intelligence then the survivors returned to Earth, where humans were living a primitive life. After establishing there for a while, as masters of the primitive humans and the other defeated races, the Sidhe did not like the wild and untamed place Earth has become after the primordial war, so most of them moved to a world that Tonn created for them.

Durung they stay on the wild Earth among primitive humans, Tonn's daughter Elme fell in love with a human named Aske, bearing many children with him, the first Breeds (among them the Crane Women) but most Sidhe still hated humans for what they had done to their race. A Sidhe minority wished to humans to recover part of their lost glory, so they taught the basics of civilization to the primitive humans. While supervising this inevitable development of human culture, Tonn tried to keep the humans from rediscovering magic and acquiring a Song of Power, pretending to be various gods including Yahweh and Baal, discouraging creativity and change. Elme, however, formed the Council of Eleu to try to help the humans improve and become a race the Sidhe could accept as equals. Tonn's wife sided with their daughter, but in a fit of anger Tonn transformed her into a monster. Tonn and most of the Sidhe then left to Sidhedark, but a consistent minority, mostly following the Council of Eleu, remained on Earth.

At the time of Kublai Khan a faction of the Sidhe wishing to bring to Sidhedark those following the Council of Eleu, manipulated the Khan providing him with a song of power which would enable him to rule the whole world, driving away the remaining Shide of Earth from their hideouts. Albeit the Khan was able to forge a huge empire, the song of power provided to him was not perfect, so he ultimately failed in his ambitions, without knowing he has always been manipulated by the Sidhe of Sidhedark. Lin Piao, the Spryggla in charge of delivering part of the song of power to Kublai Khan, was punished for his failure and was imprisoned in the valley surrounding his own beautiful palace in Sidhedark.

Finally, decades before the time of the novel, there was a war between the Sidhe and a powerful Breed sorcerer known as the Isomage, who claimed to be able to bring back to Earth all humans who - over the ages - became trapped in Sidhedark through the unwitting use of their latent powers or were brought there by the Sidhe to avoid becoming powerful mages among the humans. The Sidhe declared war on the Isomage, burning a large portion of Sidhedark and creating an area now known as the Blasted Plain; the upheavals also released some of Adonna's unwanted creations that it had hidden underground. The Isomage somewhat bluffed about hidden curses he left in the land he ruled; as he fought well his battles the Sidhe believed him and created the Pact Lands, with the towns of Euterpe and Halftown for humans and Breed to live in relative safety. The Isomage himself was exiled in a land far to the northeast of Sidhedark.

Occasionally humans accidentally find their way into Sidhedark and, unable to leave, must make the best of things. Some survive, others don't, and those who do end up in the town of Euterpe, for example near the Isomage's old house, where he established a path connecting Earth with Sidhedark.

=== The Sidhe ===
The Sidhe are a varied people, consisting of many different types:

- The Faer are the most numerous. They are humanoid with long, narrow faces and slender limbs. They often have red or reddish blond hair. They can interbreed with humans, and the offspring of such a union are called Halfbreeds, or just Breeds.
- Arborals live in forests. They are humanoid, but with green or brownish-green complexions. They control the use and distribution of all wood in the Realm. The Arborals are also responsible for preserving the memories and consciousness of dead Sidhe by pressing them into trees.
- Meteorals are Sidhe of the air. They are colorless and translucent, insubstantial in appearance like spirits, but not immaterial.
- Riverines live in rivers and streams. Like meteorals, their forms are colorless and translucent. They are some of Adonna's most devout worshippers.
- Umbrals live in shadows and avoid sunlight. Their faces are utterly black with bright star-like eyes, and they are cold to the touch. They are also some of Adonna's most devout worshippers.
- Pelagals live in the oceans.
- Amorphals live in caverns and can take many forms.

== Characters ==
=== Michael Perrin ===
Perrin is a teenager, 16 years old, still living with his parents, who seem to be fairly well-off; his father is a carpenter with a clientele that includes several wealthy and famous people. Michael tries to write poetry, but even he considers his efforts unimpressive; what he writes he himself barely understands. He is a fan of classic films and their scores. But he has hidden depths that even he doesn't know of. When a mysterious key and book fall on his lap, he follows up on it out of curiosity but ends up persevering through trials beyond anything he could have imagined.

=== Arno Waltiri ===
Waltiri is a composer who has written the scores for several classic films over the years but also wrote his own music. In 1939, after several conversations with the mysterious David Clarkham, Waltiri wrote a concerto, titled Opus 45: "Infinity", that had a strange effect on everyone who heard its first and only performance. When Michael Perrin meets him, Waltiri is an old man; he dies two weeks later. We later discover that Waltiri was in fact never human; he was in reality Aum, the Mage of the Cledar, and not even Clarkham knew this at the time.

=== David Clarkham/"The Isomage" ===
Born on Earth in 1499 to a Sidhe mother and a human father, Clarkham is thus a Breed. In the book's backstory he came to work for the Maln, attempting to prevent humans from discovering Songs of Power. He is the "person from Porlock" who interrupts poet Samuel Taylor Coleridge as he is writing his poem "Kubla Khan", which will otherwise become such a Song. However, he begins to disagree with the Maln's policy and finally rebels, attempting instead to help humans. Over time he becomes a powerful sorcerer, but calls himself the "Isomage", not wanting to be so arrogant as to assume the title of Mage, because he knows he is nowhere near as powerful as the four great Mages of legend. Several decades before the book's story begins, he rebels openly against the Sidhe in Sidhedark, starting a magical war in an attempt to stop them from interfering with humanity on Earth. The war horribly ravages a vast swath of land, which becomes known as the Blasted Plain. He loses the war, but he is still powerful enough that the Sidhe cannot kill him, so they cede some territory to him in the cease-fire treaty and make some concessions, allowing him a personal enclave and allowing humans and Breeds to live in peace in the Pact Lands beyond the Blasted Plain. By the time the book's main story takes place, he has built his impression of the wondrous palace described in "Kubla Khan" and lives there with his concubine and a few retainers.

=== Lamia and her sister ===
Lamia and her sister (unnamed in the novel, but given the name Tristesse in its sequel, The Serpent Mage) are human women, once David Clarkham's wives. After Clarkham was defeated in the war he started, he abandoned both women, and the Sidhe captured them, using their magic to horribly warp their bodies. They now live at the Isomage's old house, which stands on the gateway between the human and Sidhe worlds, which they guard, on the order of the Sidhe, who threaten to do even worse to them should they fail. Some call Lamia "the Flesh Egg", because of her shape; she is bizarrely rotund. She also appears to be reptilian in a way, as she sheds her skin periodically as her cursed body continues to grow ever more corpulent.

=== Alyons and his coursers ===
Alyons is a Sidhe, exiled to the Pact Lands. He and his riders (coursers) patrol the Pact Lands to ensure that the humans remain where they are. Alyons was assigned this duty as punishment for stealing a horse from the Irall (Temple of Adonna), a serious crime; by the time they found out, it had imprinted upon him and would recognize no other master, so they could not take it back. Alyons is extremely bitter and longs to simply kill all the humans, but the treaty forbids this; if any Sidhe attack any of the humans without provocation, some form of terrible magical retribution will occur, due to spells prepared by the Isomage.

=== Humans of Euterpe ===
- Savarin — Henrik Savarin is a former music teacher. He is described as being about forty years old, thin, with bushy, greying brown hair. He has been trapped in Sidhedark for thirty-five years at his best guess, and considers himself a scholar of the Sidhe and their language. When Michael first arrives, Savarin teaches him what he knows and asks Michael to pass on anything of interest that he learns from the Crane Women. Michael later learns that Savarin is part of a group of humans who are planning to rebel against the Sidhe and escape the Pact Lands.
- Helena — Helena Davies is a former concert pianist from New York who arrived in Sidhedark two years ago. She was the last person to arrive before Michael. Like Savarin, she is part of the human rebellion in Euterpe. Helena is attracted to Michael, but she keeps him at arm's length because she is afraid of conceiving a child. She forms a sexual relationship with Savarin because he is sterile.
- Brecker and Risky — A husband and wife who run the only hotel in Euterpe. On Lamia's order, they offer Michael room and board in exchange for work when he first arrives in the Realm.
- Sherebith — Sherebith is the warden of the Yard where the soulless human children born in Sidhedark are housed. The Children call her "mother".

=== Crane Women ===
The Crane Women, Nare, Spart, and Coom are ancient Breed sisters who live in an isolated hut outside of Halftown. Their true names are Elanare, Esparta, and Ecooma, and they are the daughters of a human father, Aske, and a Sidhe mother, Elme, the daughter of Tonn. They were the first Breeds and may be as much as 9,000 years old. Unlike other Breeds, the Crane Women are respected by the Sidhe for their wisdom and knowledge of the old ways. Young Sidhe initiates are brought to them for training in combat, magic, and mental discipline.

=== Breeds of Halftown ===
- Lirg — Lirg of the line of Wis is a Breed who manages the market in Halftown. He keeps no written records and manages all accounts from memory. On the night of the Kaeli, Halftown is raided by Sidhe and Lirg is one of the Breeds taken for sacrifice to Adonna.
- Eleuth — Eleuth is the daughter of Lirg and a human woman, making her a second generation Breed, only one quarter Sidhe. She is in love with Michael and is not discouraged by the fact that he doesn't return her feelings. Out of love for him, she attempts to use Sidhe magic to return him to earth, but she is not strong enough, leaving Michael trapped between worlds. Eleuth sacrifices herself to allow Michael to escape the guardian and return to the Realm again.

=== Biri ===
Biridashwa — called Biri by the Crane Women — is a young Sidhe initiate to the priesthood of Adonna. He is brought by Tarax to the Crane Women for training. He has never met a human before Michael. Though Biri is being trained at the same time as Michael, much of Biri's training is kept secret from him and Biri is evasive when questioned. Michael meets Biri again much later after escaping from the Irall. Biri claims to have lost faith in Adonna and the Maln, but Michael doesn't entirely trust his sudden willingness to side with humans. Biri teaches Michael the history of the Council of Eleu, created to promote harmony between humans and Sidhe, and the Maln, created to oppose it. He offers to complete Michael's training in place of the missing Crane Women, but ultimately, Michael rejects Biri's Sidhe philosophy.

=== Tarax and the Maln ===
Tarax is the leader of the Maln, the Black Order, a group of Sidhe warriors who serve Adonna. For untold millennia they have monitored the humans, whom they still hate, making sure that they never regain anything resembling magical power.

=== Lin Piao Tai ===
Lin Piao Tai is a Spryggla, one of the few whom the Sidhe allowed to retain his original form. The Spryggla have the ability to magically manipulate the shape of matter. Lin Piao Tai was tasked by the Sidhe with designing the palace of Kubla Khan which was intended to be an architectural Song of Power, transmitted to the emperor in a dream. However, the dream was interrupted and construction was stymied by an opposing faction, and the palace was never properly built. As punishment for his failure, Lin Piao Tai was imprisoned by the Sidhe. Within his valley prison, Lin Piao Tai is free to do as he wishes, and he has built a beautiful palace for himself, but as a further punishment, his magic over matter has been taken from him except relating to objects that are yellow or golden in color. To a lesser degree, he can also manipulate objects that are black, white, or grey, while red and brown things do not affect and are not affected by his magic. However, the color blue is deadly to him.

=== Nikolai Nikolaevich Kuprin ===
Nikolai was a dancer who came from Leningrad to the United States to dance at the Denishawn school, but he had always been more attracted to music than dance. He was transported to the Realm at the age of fourteen while playing Stravinsky's Rite of Spring on the piano. He arrived in the middle of the final battle of the Isomage's war, and he was caught by magic which aged him. He escaped capture by Alyons and his coursers and was taken in by a sympathetic Sidhe woman in the females' city of Inyas Trai, under the protection of the Ban of Hours. Nikolai introduces Michael to her.

=== Ulath of the line of Wis ===
An attendant to the Ban of Hours, friend to Nikolai.

=== The Ban of Hours ===
The keeper of the Sidhe's records, the Ban of Hours is very powerful but is also fond of humans and of Earth. No one who sees her can remember what she looks like. She is Tonn's daughter, sister of Elme, and she "stayed by Tonn when Elme defied him", although now she covertly opposes Tarax and the Maln.

=== Emma Livry ===
A human dancer, she was just 20 years old in 1863 when David Clarkham came to her and arranged for her to dance a Song of Power. The Sidhe of the Maln arranged for her to be terribly burned in a fire to prevent this, but the Council of Eleu came, healed her, and took her with them. She lives in the city of Inyas Trai.

=== Tonn/Adonna ===
One of the four most powerful Mages, Tonn created Sidhedark millions of years ago for his people, the Sidhe, to live in when they left Earth. The world he created wasn't as well made as Earth, because it was his work alone. Now, at the time of the book's story, the rest of the Sidhe barely remember him as Tonn and worship him as Adonna, believing him to be a god. He is growing tired, though, and knows that his world will collapse sooner or later, so it will have to be reunified with Earth so the Sidhe can escape Sidehedark's destruction. Tarax and the Maln serve him, but this would be difficult for them to accept, so he does not tell them about this plan.

== Reviews ==
- Review by Faren Miller (1984) in Locus, #285 October 1984
- Review by Don D'Ammassa (1985) in Science Fiction Chronicle, #64 January 1985
- Review by Thomas A. Easton [as by Tom Easton] (1985) in Analog Science Fiction/Science Fact, May 1985
- Review by Paul M. Lloyd (1985) in Fantasy Review, June 1985
- Review by Charles de Lint (1988) in Short Form, February 1988
- Review by Tom A. Jones [as by Tom Jones] (1988) in Vector 144
- Review by Phyllis McDonald (1988) in Interzone, #24 Summer 1988
- Review [French] by Piet Hollander (1991) in Yellow Submarine, #86
