= Emma Törzs =

American novelist

- Born: January 8, 1987 (age 39)
- Education: Macalester College, BA; University of Montana
- Occupations: Translator, Professor, Author
- Writing career
- Language: English
- Genre: Speculative fiction
- Notable work: Ink Blood Sister Scribe
- Notable awards: World Fantasy Award; O. Henry Prize

Emma Törzs (born January 8, 1987) is an American university professor and literary author whose debut novel has been optioned by Amazon MGM Studios. She has been awarded a US National Endowment for the Arts fellowship in prose, a World Fantasy Award for Short Fiction, and the O. Henry Prize.

== Career ==
Törzs has written short fiction for a variety of publications. She was awarded the O. Henry Prize for short stories in 2015, a World Fantasy Award for short stories in 2019, and an NEA fellowship in 2020.

In 2023, Törzs published her first novel, Ink Blood Sister Scribe, about two estranged half-sisters tasked with guarding their family's library. It was a Sunday Times Bestseller, a Good Morning America Book Club pick, one of the New York Times' 100 Notable Books of 2023, and one of NPR's Best Books of 2023. It also won a 2024 Minnesota Book Award for Genre Fiction.

In May 2024, it was announced that a film series adaptation of Ink Blood Sister Scribe titled Ink was greenlit by Gato Grande, an Amazon MGM Studios company. The project will adapted by Bronwyn Garrity, and executive produced by Törzs and Gato Grande CEO Carla Gonzalez Vargas.

Törzs teaches creative writing and Fantasy Fiction writing at her alma mater, Macalester College.

== Personal life ==
Törzs grew up in Massachusetts. She holds a BA in cultural studies from Macalester College and an MFA in fiction from the University of Montana.

Törzs' mother was a poet and taught creative writing and mythology at a community college. She has four sisters.

== Bibliography ==
=== Novel ===
- Ink Blood Sister Scribe (2023)

=== Short stories ===
- "Hard Mother" in American Short Fiction (2022)
- "The Path of Water" in Uncanny Magazine (2022)
- "The Hungry Ones" in Uncanny Magazine (2021)
- "Alone" in Strange Horizons (2020)
- "The Widow" in Beneath Ceaseless Skies (2020)
- "High in the Clean Blue Air" in Uncanny Magazine (2020)
- "Like a River Loves the Sky" winner of World Fantasy Award for Best Short Story (2019)
- "From the Root" in Lightspeed Magazine (2018)
