= Kelly Robson =

Canadian science fiction, fantasy and horror writer

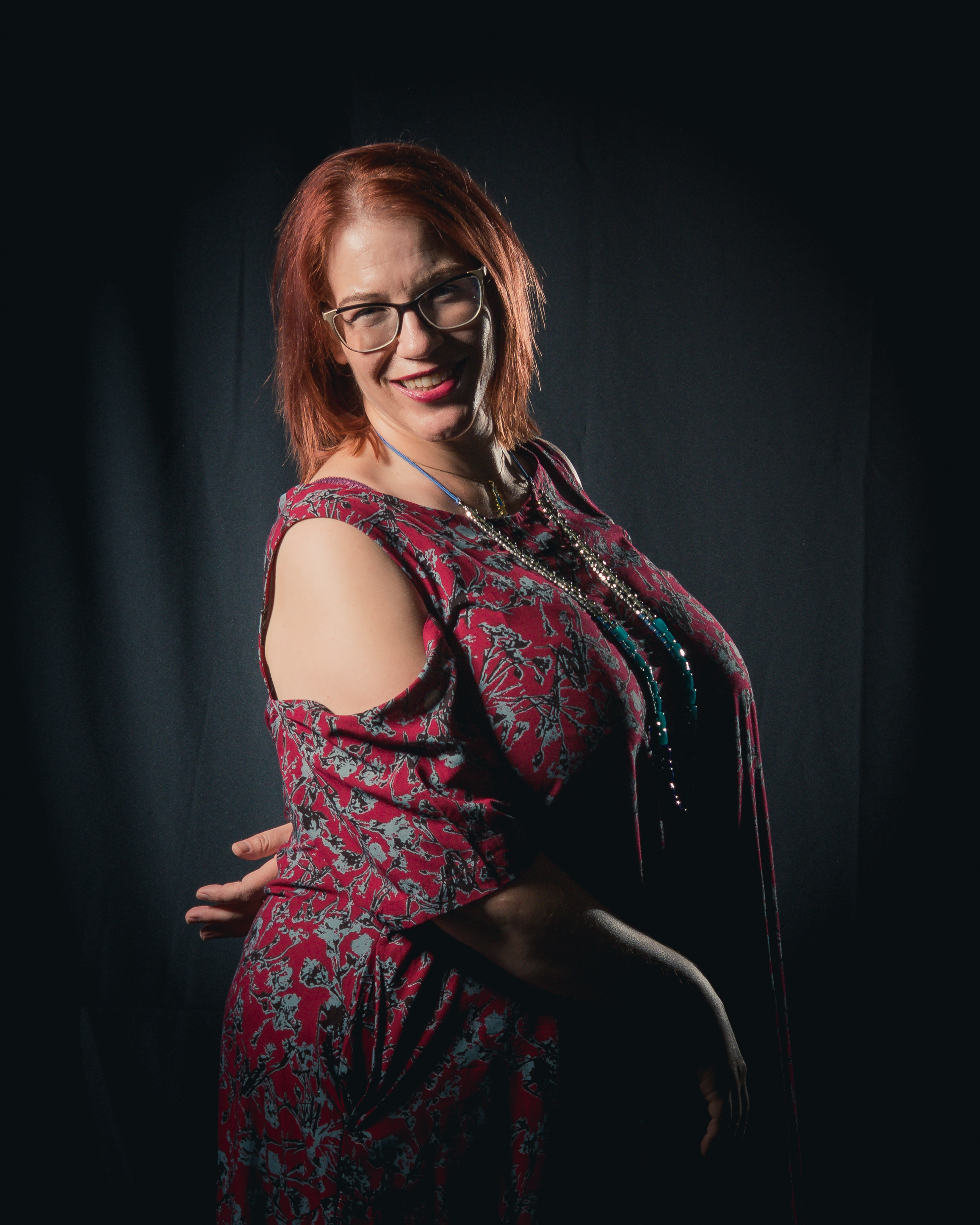
- Born: July 17, 1967 (age 58) Edmonton, Alberta, Canada
- Citizenship: Canada
- Genre: Science fiction, fantasy, horror
- Notable awards: 2018 Nebula Award for Best Novelette

Kelly Robson (born July 17, 1967 in Edmonton, Alberta) is a Canadian science fiction, fantasy and horror writer. She has won the 2018 Nebula Award for Best Novelette for her novelette "A Human Stain" published at Tor.com. She has also been nominated for the Nebula Award for Best Novella in 2016 for "Waters of Versailles" and in 2019 for "Gods, Monsters and the Lucky Peach", both published at Tor.com; "Waters of Versailles" also received the 2016 Aurora Award for best Canadian short fiction.

== Personal life ==
Robson is married to fellow Canadian science fiction writer A. M. Dellamonica, and lives in Toronto. She and Dellamonica married twice: unofficially in 1989, and again in 2003 after same-sex marriage was legalized in Ontario.

== Bibliography ==
- 2015: "The Three Resurrections of Jessica Churchill." Clarkesworld Magazine. Finalist for the Theodore Sturgeon Award.
- 2015: "Good for Grapes." The Exile Book of New Canadian Noir, edited by Claude Lalumière and David Nickle, published by Exile Editions.
- 2015: "Waters of Versailles." Tor.com. Finalist for the 2016 Nebula Award for Best Novella. Finalist for the 2016 World Fantasy Award for Best Novella. Winner of the 2016 Prix Aurora Award for best short fiction.
- 2015: "Two-year man". Asimov's Science Fiction. 39 (8): 28–35. August 2015. (Note: Finalist for the Sunburst Award.)
- 2015: "The Gladiator Lie." License Expired: The Unauthorized James Bond, edited by Madeline Ashby and David Nickle.
- 2017: "A Human Stain." Tor.com. Winner of the 2018 Nebula Award for Best Novelette. Finalist for the 2018 Aurora Award for best short fiction.
- 2017: "The Desperate Flesh." Nasty: Fetish Fights Back, edited by Anna Yeatts & Chris Phillips.
- 2017: "We Who Live In The Heart." Clarkesworld Magazine.
- 2017: "What Gentle Women Dare." Uncanny Magazine.
- 2018: "Intervention." Infinity's End, edited by Jonathan Strahan.
- 2018: "Gods, Monsters and the Lucky Peach." Tor.com. Finalist for the 2019 Nebula Award for Best Novella.
- 2018: "A Study in Oils." Clarkesworld Magazine.
- 2019: "Skin City." The Verge's Better Worlds.
- 2022: High Times in the Low Parliament. Tor.com. Finalist for the Nebula Award for Best Novella in 2023.

———————

Bibliography notes
