= Serpent Mage (Bear novel) =

First edition (publ. Berkley Books) Cover artist: Julek Heller

Serpent Mage (ISBN 0712616721) is a fantasy novel published in 1986 by Greg Bear. , it is the sequel to The Infinity Concerto.

== Plot ==
Michael Perrin is now back home on Earth, living with his parents and continuing his training. Perrin has inherited Arno Waltiri's home and estate. Perrin moves in and begins to go through Waltiri's papers, where he finds a strange news story about bodies that were discovered in a nearby hotel. Perrin is contacted by a musical faculty member from UCLA, Kristine Pendeers. Pendeers is searching for Infinity Concerto - Opus 45 with hopes that it has been left in Waltiri's estate, with the goal of completing Mahler's unfinished Symphony and performing the two pieces together. Perrin trains an apprentice Sidhe, and tries to arbitrate a peace between Sidhe and humans.

== Reviews ==
- Review by Faren Miller (1986) in Locus, #308 September 1986
- Review by Pascal J. Thomas (1986) in Fantasy Review, December 1986
- Review [French] by Pascal J. Thomas (1987) in A&A, #102
- Review by Thomas A. Easton [as by Tom Easton] (1987) in Analog Science Fiction/Science Fact, July 1987
- Review by Charles de Lint (1988) in Short Form, February 1988
- Review by Tom A. Jones [as by Tom Jones] (1988) in Vector 144
- Review by Phyllis McDonald (1988) in Interzone, #24 Summer 1988
- Review by Alan Fraser (1989) in Paperback Inferno, #78
- Review [French] by Piet Hollander (1991) in Yellow Submarine, #86
