= The Bruising of Qilwa =

2022 fantasy novella by Naseem Jamnia

- Author: Naseem Jamnia
- Language: English
- Genre: Speculative fiction, fantasy
- Published: 9 Aug 2022
- Publisher: Tachyon
- Publication place: United States
- Pages: 176
- Website: https://www.naseemwrites.com/the-bruising-of-qilwa

The Bruising of Qilwa is a 2022 fantasy novella by Naseem Jamnia, the author's debut work. The plot centers on a non-binary refugee healer who practices blood magic and discovers a mysterious illness in their new city. The work was a finalist for the 2023 Locus Award for Best First Novel.

== Plot ==
Firuz-e Jafari is a blood magic adept of Sassanian ethnicity. Sassanians, and blood magic users in particular, face genocide in the mainland nation of Dilmun. Firuz and their family flee to the island city-state of Qilwa.

A plague sweeps through the city. Firuz gets a job as a healer's assistant working under a man named Kofi, hiding their true magical affinity. As the plague ravages the city, they find several examples of corpses with bone marrow disease and suspect them to be the result of an untrained blood magic user.

Firuz heals a sick girl named Afsoneh and recognizes her as having an affinity for blood magic. They begin to train her and she becomes part of their family. Firuz's brother Parviz needs an alignment spell to make his body reflect his male gender identity. Firuz worries about the safety of such a spell, driving a rift between the siblings.

Firuz's patients begin experiencing a mysterious ailment characterized by non-healing bruises and fatigue, eventually leading to death in some cases. They suspect this is related to the diseased corpses. When a teenager named Ahmed contracts the blood bruising, Firuz uses their blood magic to attempt a healing spell. This backfires and Ahmed dies. Firuz is accused of murder by Ahmed's parents.

Kofi diffuses the situation and leads Firuz to a laboratory under the clinic. Despite having no training in blood magic, Kofi reveals that he was performing experiments in order to find a cure for plague victims. The blood bruising disease was the unintended result. Kofi believes that the Sassanian prohibition on experiments with blood magic is holding back scientific progress, and that further experiments will result in increased healthcare access for refugees. Firuz refuses to help Kofi with his experiments. Kofi infects Firuz with the blood bruising. Afsoneh and Firuz kill Kofi, use his laboratory to concoct a cure, and then burn down the clinic to hide the evidence.

The next year, Parviz's alignment spell has been successful. Afsoneh continues her training with blood magic. Firuz is saving money to open a clinic, intending to help refugees and honor Kofi's legacy.

== Reception ==
Gary Wolfe, reviewing from Locus, praised the book as "considerably bigger on the inside than it first appears, and it’s a rewarding addition to that growing body of fantastic fiction addressing themes of colonialism, bigotry, gender, and cultural identity", but also commented that "many readers might hope for a more thorough introduction to this world", noting several details of the world as lacking. Still, the review concluded that "the world of the book is one we’d like to know more about, and Jamnia is a writer worth paying attention to."

Writing for Tor.com, Martin Cahill called the book "a masterful debut" and "a reminder of what you can truly do with the fantasy genre". Cahill praised Jamnia's narrative confidence, writing that it feels like a fourth or fifth novel rather than a debut work. This review applauded Jamnia's exploration of immigration, refugee status, and queerness.

Writing for Grimdark Magazine, Carrie Chi Lough called the setting "a wondrous new world" with "some of the most memorable voices I’ve read in fantasy". She also wrote that the novella might have been better served as a full-length novel to explore more of the medical mystery. Publishers Weekly called the story "a short, propulsive tale that admirably centers a strong queer protagonist and offers thought-provoking commentary on the struggles of refugees". The same review noted that some of the storytelling elements felt rushed.

Writing for the New York Journal of Books, fantasy author Marie Brennan wrote that the novella "feels like a novel packed into a too-small sack", but that this is a better mistake to make than having a novella with too little content. She praised the novella's Persian-inspired setting and conceptualization of gender roles, while noting that the plot lines "feel packed in too tightly to breathe".

The Bruising of Qilwa was a finalist for the 2023 Locus Award for Best First Novel and 2023 World Fantasy Award for Best Novella.
