= Kai Ashante Wilson =

- Born: Toledo, Ohio
- Occupation: Author
- Writing career
- Genre: speculative fiction

Kai Ashante Wilson is an American author of speculative fiction active since 2013.

== Biography ==
Wilson lives in New York City.

== Literary career ==
Wilson was the 2010 Octavia Butler scholar at the San Diego Clarion Writing Workshop. His work has appeared in various periodicals, podcasts and anthologies, including Apex Magazine, The Best Science Fiction and Fantasy of the Year: Volume Nine, The Best Science Fiction and Fantasy of the Year: Volume Ten, The Best Science Fiction and Fantasy of the Year: Volume Twelve, Bloodchildren: Stories by the Octavia E. Butler Scholars, Fantasy Magazine, The Long List Anthology, The Long List Anthology Volume 2, Nebula Awards Showcase 2016, PodCastle, Some of the Best From Tor.com, The Stories: Five Years of Original Fiction on Tor.com, Stories for Chip: A Tribute to Samuel R. Delany, Tor.com, The Year's Best Dark Fantasy & Horror: 2016, The Year's Best Dark Fantasy & Horror: 2018, and Worlds Seen in Passing: Ten Years of Tor.com Short Fiction.

== Awards ==
Wilson won the 2016 Crawford Award for best first novel for The Sorcerer of the Wildeeps. His works have been shortlisted for the Hugo Award, Nebula Award, Shirley Jackson Award, Theodore Sturgeon Award, Locus Award, and World Fantasy Award.

== Bibliography ==
=== Short novels / novellas ===
- The Sorcerer of the Wildeeps (2015)
- A Taste of Honey (2016)

=== Short fiction ===
- "Légendaire" (2013), set in the same world as the later The Sorcerer of the Wildeeps
- "Super Bass" (2013), set in the same world as the later The Sorcerer of the Wildeeps
- "The Devil in America" (2014)
- "Kaiju maximus®: "'So Various, So Beautiful, So New'"" (2015)
- "The Lamentation of Their Women" (2017)

=== Nonfiction ===
- "Strange Antecedents: A Personal Appreciation of Margo Lanagan's Novels" (2015)
- "The POC Guide to Writing Dialect In Fiction" (2016)
