= Their Bright Ascendency =

2017–19 novel trilogy by K. Arsenault Rivera

First editions

Their Bright Ascendency, also called the Ascendant trilogy, is a trilogy of epistolary epic fantasy novels by the American writer K. Arsenault Rivera. It consists of Arsenault Rivera's debut novel The Tiger's Daughter (2017), The Phoenix Empress (2018), and The Warrior Moon (2019).

== Premise ==
The story takes place in a secondary world inspired by historical East and Central Asian cultures. The series is concerned with the adventures of, and the romantic relationship between, two young warrior noblewomen: Shizuka, the heir to the Hokkaran Empire, and Shefali, daughter of the ruler of the Qorin steppe nomads.

The books take the form of a collection of letters between the two. The trilogy is part of a type of fantasy based on Middle Eastern, Central or East Asian history, sometimes called "Silk Road fantasy".

== Reception ==
In a starred review of The Tiger's Daughter, Publishers Weekly praised "Rivera's immense imagination and finely detailed worldbuilding". In Tor.com, Liz Bourke highlighted the book's focus on female characters, describing it as "an epic fantasy romance between god-like heroes, and both of them are women. And they’re both the daughters of heroic, immensely competent women. And their world is populated with many other competent women."

== Novels ==
1. The Tiger’s Daughter, Tor Books, 3 October 2017, ISBN 978-0765392534
2. The Phoenix Empress, Tor Books, 9 October 2018, ISBN 978-0765392572
3. The Warrior Moon, Tor Books, 24 September 2019, ISBN 978-0765392596
