= The Brides of High Hill =

2024 fantasy novella by Nghi Vo

- Author: Nghi Vo
- Language: English
- Series: Singing Hills Cycle
- Release number: 5
- Genre: Fantasy; Gothic fiction
- Publisher: Tordotcom
- Publication date: May 7, 2024
- Publication place: United States
- Media type: Print
- Pages: 115
- ISBN: 9781250851444 (hardcover 1st ed.)
- Preceded by: Mammoths at the Gates
- Followed by: A Mouthful of Dust

The Brides of High Hill is a 2024 fantasy novella by Nghi Vo. It is the fifth entry in her Singing Hills Cycle. It follows Cleric Chih as they accompany a young bride and her family to her wedding to an older lord. During the preparations for the wedding, Chih experiences ominous events and learns that there is more to the lord's estate than meets the eye.

The book received critical praise; it was a finalist for the 2025 Hugo Award for Best Novella and Locus Award for Best Novella.

== Plot ==
Prior to the beginning of the book, Cleric Chih was traveling without their talking hoopoe companion, Almost Brilliant. Chih met Pham Nhung and her parents on the road and was invited to accompany Nhung to her wedding to Lord Guo. They reach Doi Cao, Nhung's future home. Chih notes that the wealthy Lord Guo is much older than Nhung, whose family has fallen on hard times. While the Phams begin marriage negotiations, a mysterious young man appears. He tells Chih to ask Lord Guo how many wives he has previously had.

Lord Guo throws a celebratory banquet. It is interrupted by the mysterious young man, Lord Guo's son Guo Zhihao. Zhihao appears to be mad and is cared for by attendants, who take him away.

Chih and Nhung take an illicit nighttime tour of the estate. They find the library in disrepair, and Chih destroys magical wards which are disturbing to Nhung. They witness Zhihao sleepwalking; Nhung brings him to the nursery to recover.

The next morning, Lord Guo woos Nhung. Meanwhile, Chih interviews Zhihao. Zhihao begins behaving erratically, writing multiple pages, then attacks Chih. Zhihao is subdued by guards, and Chih returns to their room. They suspect that Zhihao is under the effects of a curse which binds his tongue. Chih finds a note which Zhihao tucked into their robe during the attack, which arranges a clandestine meeting later that night. Nhung and Chih meet Zhihao, who is unable to tell them his secrets. Zhihao directs them to open storage chests. They find the preserved body of Lord Guo’s first wife, wrapped in a fox skin.

Chih plans to help Nhung escape, but when they reach their guesthouse, she is summoned by Lord Guo. Chih realizes that they cannot remember how they came to be on the road to Doi Cao, and the Phams' shadows begin behaving oddly. That night, Lord Guo hosts another banquet. Chih realizes that the served food is all foul, but the guests eat and drink happily and it devolves into a raucous celebration. A servant tells Chih that Nhung and Lord Guo spoiled the estate's food stores, and everything served at the feast was supplied by the Pham family retainers. Chih warns the servant and attempts to leave quietly, but before they reach the door, the Phams and their retainers reveal themselves as fox spirits and begin to slaughter the other guests. Chih attempts to defend themself by throwing a teapot, which smashes on the floor and transforms back into Almost Brilliant. Chih escapes and meets Zhihao. They gather up as many staff as they can and hide in the decaying library, which is protected by magical wards. Almost Brilliant reveals that the Pham family enchanted Chih and transformed Almost Brilliant into a teapot.

The next morning, Chih and Zhihao speak with Nhung. Nhung claims that Doi Cai once belonged to her people and that it was stolen by humans. Chih negotiates for the safety of the survivors, which she is reluctant to guarantee. Zhihao exchanges his father's skull for the lives and safety of the surviving staff. There is a legend that says Nhung may be able to use it to revive her aunt, who was the fox skin wrapped around the body of Guo's first wife. The survivors walk away from Doi Cao. Chih suggests that Zhihao seek assistance at Singing Hills, where they may be able to find a way to lift the curse and allow him to tell his story.

== Reception and awards ==
Marlene Harris of Library Journal gave the book a starred review. Harris compared the book to Nothing But Blackened Teeth by Cassandra Khaw, noting that this is a "highly recommended" entry into the Singing Hills Cycle.

Publishers Weekly called the novella "evocative" and praised Vo's signature writing style. The review commented upon the ominous mood of the book. It concluded that "[this] eerie and intricate entry keeps the series going strong."

Writing for Locus, Gary K. Wolfe stated that the Singing Hills novellas allow Vo to explore different genres and different traditions of storytelling. The Brides of High Hill takes a darker turn than previous entries, with elements of classic fairy tales and Gothic fiction. Wolfe states that this entry in the series moves away from the "stories-about-stories conventions" of previous entries, expanding the possibilities for the future of the series. The reviewer compared Chih to the character of Father Brown, calling them "more engaging and vulnerable here than ever before."

Tina S. Zhu of Strange Horizons praised the novella's secondary characters. Zhu compared the character of Nhung to Luli Wei of Vo's novel Siren Queen, writing that both characters serve as examples of ambitious and charismatic women. Zhu also notes that the character of Guo Zhihao both embodies and subverts the trope of "madwoman-in-the-attic" prevalent in Gothic fiction. Zhu felt that the character of Chih is underdeveloped, which is partly as a consequence of the fact that the novellas can be read in any order. Chih often serves as an observer and recorder "without much introspection or reflection on their own part." Zhu concluded that the story is a satisfying Gothic mystery with sumptuous prose.

Bill Capossere of fantasyliterature.com gave the novella three and a half stars out of a possible five. The reviewer found the tale "a solid enough of a story if a bit slight". Capossere praised the pace, which starts off slow and allows for the reader to become comfortable before the horrific elements emerge. The reviewer noted that this is the only entry in the series that he has read, and felt that long-term series fans might experience a stronger connection to the work.

The book was a finalist for the 2025 Hugo Award for Best Novella and Locus Award for Best Novella.
