= A Mouthful of Dust =

2025 fantasy novella by Nghi Vo

- Author: Nghi Vo
- Illustrator: Alyssa Winans
- Language: English
- Series: Singing Hills Cycle
- Release number: 6
- Genre: Fantasy
- Publisher: Tordotcom
- Publication date: October 7, 2025
- Publication place: United States
- Pages: 112 (Hardcover)
- ISBN: 9781250386403
- Preceded by: The Brides of High Hill
- Followed by: A Long and Speaking Silence

A Mouthful of Dust is a 2025 fantasy novella by Nghi Vo. Like the other books in the Singing Hills Cycle, it follows Cleric Chih and their talking hoopoe companion, Almost Brilliant. The novella received critical attention; it was a finalist for the 2026 Locus Award for Best Novella and 2026 World Fantasy Award for Long Fiction.

== Plot ==
Cleric Chih and their talking hoopoe companion, Almost Brilliant, visit the town of Baolin. Chih hopes to record stories about a famine which occurred eighteen years ago. The town was haunted by a demon, the Great Houshun, which caused the famine.

Chih finds a human jawbone and resolve to give it a proper burial. They also rescue a stray white kitten. They visit a local tavern, where waiter Li Shui tells them the story of the only time a secret recipe was shared with outsiders. Shui's ancestors have lived in Baolin for generations; he comes from a line of chefs. During the third year of the famine, Shui's mother saw a group of demons in the woods. She offered the Great Houshun a recipe for Baolin pork, a local delicacy, thus ending the famine.

Chih is brought before Magistrate Liu. Liu hopes to hide the truth about the famine and keeps Chih under guard. Nevertheless, Chih interviews a guard and his family. Chih hears several stories, including an anecdote about villagers eating cookies made of dust.

Madame Liu hosts Chih for dinner. She tells them a story, which Chih recognizes as a lie. Madame Liu claims that the magistrate's household also suffered severely during the famine. Deiyi, the magistrate's second wife, lost her daughter Orchid to starvation. The other survivors cannibalized Orchid's corpse; Deiyi killed herself soon after. Since that time, the magistrate's household has never again served meat. That night, the magistrate searches for the white kitten, which Chih hides from him.

The next evening, Liu tells Chih about surviving a famine in the city of Zhan. Chih senses a haunting presence, and the magistrate continues to search for the kitten. Almost Brilliant is unable to find Deiyi's grave. Chih realizes that the jawbone belonged to Deiyi, who is now haunting the place where she died. Deiyi kills and eats the magistrate. Chih flees back to Shui's tavern.

Madame Liu summons Chih once again; she relates the following story. After Orchid's death, she overheard her husband discussing the famine with the Great Houshun itself. Liu sacrificed his daughter Orchid to the demon. He then killed Deiyi and cooked her whole, feeding her to the demon. Madame Liu reminisces about Orchid, remembering her as a child who played with a white kitten. During the middle of the famine, the family killed and ate the kitten. After the story, Madame Liu serves Chih a cookie made of dust. She states she will have pork for dinner.

Chih says farewell to Li Shui and returns to Singing Hills.

== Background and publication history ==
In an interview with Paul Semel, Vo stated that the novella was written shortly after The Empress of Salt and Fortune. It was temporarily set aside because Vo's agent felt that audiences in the year 2020 were not ready for a story with so much cannibalism. Vo went on to write When the Tiger Came Down the Mountain and returned to A Mouthful of Dust five years later. Some ideas in Dust were inspired by food shortages during the COVID-19 pandemic, as well as the hunger has been used as a "social control" throughout human history.

The Singing Hills novellas can be read in any order. Gary K. Wolfe noted that this novella takes place several decades after The Empress of Salt and Fortune. The author stated that it takes place shortly before The Brides of High Hill.

== Reception and awards ==
In a starred review for Booklist, Leah von Essen called A Mouthful of Dust a "particularly successful" entry into the Singing Hills Cycle. Von Essen noted that the stories introduced in this volume contain both truths and falsehoods, and the review stated that " both want to know and don't want to know the full truth..." The review concluded that the novella is a "shivery, dark addition to a superb series."

Gary K. Wolfe of Locus compared the book to The Brides of High Hill, noting that both entries in the series feature haunted houses and ghosts. A Mouthful of Dust focuses on the effects of famine, as well as the efforts of powerful people to tell their own versions of history. Wolfe praised the series, noting that this entry is "as masterful and ingenious as any in the Singing Hills series, which only seems to gain in richness and depth as it goes on."

The novella was a finalist for the 2026 Locus Award for Best Novella and the 2026 World Fantasy Award for Long Fiction.
