= Siren Queen =

2022 novel by Nghi Vo

- Author: Nghi Vo
- Publisher: Tordotcom
- Publication date: 2022

Siren Queen (2022) is a historical fantasy novel by Nghi Vo set in a magical 1930s Los Angeles. The story follows an aspiring actor known as Luli Wei, who hopes to achieve immortality through stardom. Hollywood provides obstacles in the form of racism, sexism, queerphobia, and dark magic. Luli rejects stereotypical roles on-screen and off, instead embracing the power of playing movie monsters. The book was Vo's first novel to be written, but the second to be published, preceded by The Chosen and the Beautiful (2021) in a similar magical universe. It received positive reviews in speculative fiction venues, and was a 2023 finalist for the World Fantasy Award, the Locus Award, and the Ignyte Award.

== Plot ==
A young Chinese-American girl, whose parents run a laundry in a magical Los Angeles, resolves to become a movie star. Achieving stardom, in this Hollywood, involves a literal apotheosis that grants immortality. After a series of bit parts for the director Jacko Dewalt, she blackmails him to meet the studio executive Oberlin Wolfe. To avoid revealing her real name (and thus making herself magically vulnerable), she takes her sister's name, Luli.

Luli joins Wolfe's studio system, on the condition that her roles will include "no maids, no funny talking, no fainting flowers." These conditions limit her career. She befriends her roommate in the studio dorms, a kidnapped Skogsrå named Greta. She also begins a romance with the more-established actress Emmaline Sauvignon. Greta falls in love with Wolfe's protégé Brandt Hiller, whom Wolfe intends to sacrifice in that year's ritualistic Wild Hunt, through which Wolfe feeds a dangerous ancient power. Eventually, Luli lands a major role as a siren. She befriends her famous co-star Harry Long, who reveals to her his secret relationship with a man. Luli's siren movie is a hit, as is its sequel. Greta (now pregnant) and Luli rescue Brandt during the Wild Hunt, and he and Greta escape to Sweden. Emmaline rejects Luli, angry that she drew Wolfe's negative attention.

Two years later, Luli's initial contract with Wolfe is nearly over. While filming the third siren movie, the set catches fire and Harry disappears; he is declared dead. Luli connects with the butch Tara Lubowski at a lesbian bar. Jacko is brought on to direct a hasty re-envisioning of the siren film without Harry in the lead. As Jacko's revenge on Luli for her long-ago blackmail, the film now ends with the siren begging pathetically for her life. Luli is initially angry that Tara (under a male pseudonym) has written this degrading ending, but after she and Tara get to know each other better, they begin a romance. Filming the climactic death scene of her siren, Luli achieves magical stardom. She re-signs with Wolfe from a position of power.

The epilogue is narrated from Luli's perspective as a celestial star in the present day, reflecting on the legacy of her long career and her romantic relationships.

== Development and inspiration ==
Vo initially wrote a draft of Siren Queen for a contest run by Angry Robot, which sought novels from writers who didn't yet have agents. It was the first novel she wrote, although her second novel The Chosen and the Beautiful (2021) would be published before it. She spent around three months writing. Despite being rejected in the contest, Vo began sending the draft to agents, and eventually gained representation from Diana Fox. At the time, it was her longest piece of writing. Vo described the length as a challenging departure from her early career in short stories, stating, “I work best with boundaries. I love speculative fiction as the genre without limits, but that can be deeply paralyzing sometimes.” Vo has characterized the first draft of Siren Queen as "three novellas in a trench coat" and credits Fox with guiding its revision into a more unified novel.

The movies starring Luli's siren are loosely inspired by 1930s horror films and the later Creature from the Black Lagoon (1954). Other influential movies include Morocco (1930), Shanghai Express (1932), Queen Christina (1933), and Design for Living (1933). The characters of Greta and Harry Long are inspired by Greta Garbo and Ramon Novarro. The Chinese-American star Anna May Wong is mostly reflected in a minor character in the novel, Su Tong Lin, though Wong shares some details of her background with the novel's protagonist Luli. Another minor character, Louisa Davis, echoes Hattie McDaniel. In general, these inspirations are loose, with no real films or specific biographical events being dramatized in the novel.

== Style ==
The novel is framed like a memoir, narrated by a future Luli who consciously navigates the differences between truth and memory. One effect of a retrospective first-person narration, according to Vo, is that it gives readers an implicit assurance that the protagonist will survive the dark events of the novel. Scenes from movies are also described like Luli's memories, weaving them in to the narrative. The fantasy elements are introduced without explanation, only gradually building into a distinctive world. A key narrative effect is a feeling of unreality, or the sense that metaphors are actually real. These ambiguities contribute to an overall environment of suspense, since the reader is never quite provided enough information to fully understand the dark magic that Luli navigates. The environment of uncertain, lurking danger has been compared stylistically to the horror writing of Shirley Jackson (1916–1965).

== Major themes ==
=== Hollywood's Fairyland rules ===
Vo's first ideas for the novel began with seeing similarities between the 1930s Hollywood studio system and folklore depictions of Fairyland. Specifically, she describes Hollywood as mirroring Fairyland through "its promises of immortality and beauty, its penchant for stealing names and faces, the prevalence of bets you can’t win unless you can and some really, really dark underpinnings." In Siren Queen, this connection is expressed through the fantasy worldbuilding of the setting, which has some elements of allegory. According to Gary K. Wolfe, Vo's setting builds on the literary convention of depicting Hollywood as "a kind of hallucinogenic inferno of ambition, lust, corruption, and betrayal." A central theme of the novel is that exploitative systems allow for few good choices, and even successful agreements can be akin to "monkey's-paw pacts" when negotiating with dangerous powers.

=== Outsider status and monstrosity ===
Wolfe describes Luli as "a multiple outsider in a rigged system", facing racism (especially Chinese exclusionism), sexism, and queerphobia. Others often perceive her as inherently monstrous or not-fully-human due to her marginalized identity. Commenting on Luli's main character traits, Vo has said that "like a lot of mean people out there, she is afraid all the time." Her pursuit of stardom is, in part, an attempt to avoid the limited social roles available to her in her ordinary life -- even though success in Hollywood requires navigating the equally limited fictional roles offered by those with the most power. A central question of the book is whether Luli desires stardom so much that she will sacrifice her authenticity by accepting racial stereotypes in her roles and keeping her queer relationships secret. Her embrace of her monstrous siren character accompanies an embrace of a non-assimilationist strategy: she claims power by setting her own terms and forcing others to accede to them, sometimes ruthlessly.

== Publication and reception ==
Siren Queen was published by Tordotcom in 2022, with hardcover and ebook editions. An audiobook narrated by Natalie Naudus was published by Macmillan Audio in June. A paperback edition was released in 2023.

The novel was reviewed positively by the speculative fiction magazines Locus, Strange Horizons, Reactor, and Lightspeed. It received a starred review in Publishers Weekly. Reviews praised the distinctive and memorable setting, characters, and prose style. Several reviewers commented that the novel continued the success of her earlier works, solidifying Vo's reputation as a speculative fiction writer. In 2023, Siren Queen was a finalist for the World Fantasy Award, the Locus Award, and the Ignyte Award.
