= Bogi Takács =

Hungarian writer (born 1983)

- Born: 25 December 1983 (age 42); Győr, Hungary
- Education: ELTE University of Budapest; University of Iowa; University of Kansas
- Occupations: Author; Linguist
- Spouse: R. B. Lemberg
- Writing career
- Genres: Science fiction, fantasy, poetry
- Notable awards: Hugo Award for Best Fan Writer; Lambda for Transgender Literature
- Website: www.prezzey.net

Bogi Takács (born 25 December 1983) is a Hungarian poet, writer, psycholinguist, editor, and translator. Takács is an intersex, agender, trans, Jewish writer who has written Torah-inspired Jewish-themed work, and uses e/em/eir/emself or they/them pronouns.

== Career ==
Takács, who is disabled, has worked with a number of other writers on projects such as Disabled People Destroy. They have been published in Strange Horizons, Uncanny, Lightspeed, Clarkesworld, Publishers Weekly and Apex. They completed an undergraduate degree, two master's degrees, an MSc in Experimental and Cognitive Psychology, and an MA in Theoretical Linguistics, all from ELTE University of Budapest. They moved to the United States to complete further post-graduate work at the University of Iowa. They completed their Ph.D. at the University of Kansas in 2022.

== Personal life ==
Takács currently resides in the United States. They are autistic, and so is their child.

== Projects ==
Takács writes a blog titled "Bogi Reads the World" dedicated to reviewing speculative fiction by marginalized authors. The site was launched in October 2016 and was most recently updated in May 2024.

== Awards and nominations ==
- Winner of the Lambda Literary Award for Transgender Fiction for Transcendent 2: The Year's Best Transgender Speculative Fiction
- Finalist for the Locus Award for Transcendent 2: The Year's Best Transgender Speculative Fiction
- Finalist for the 2018 and 2019 Hugo Award for Best Fan Writer
- Winner of the 2020 Hugo Award for Best Fan Writer
- Nominee for the 2020 and 2021 Elgin Awards for Algorithmic Shapeshifting
- Finalist for the 2020 Lambda Literary Award for Transgender Fiction for The Trans Space Octopus Congregation
- Finalist for the 2023 Ignyte Awards Critics Award
- Shortlisted for the 2023 Lambda Literary Award for Anthology for Rosalind's Siblings: Fiction and Poetry Celebrating Scientists of Marginalized Genders
- Finalist for the 2026 Locus Award for Best First Novel for the debut novel, Song of Spores

== Selected bibliography ==
=== Editor ===
- Rosalind's Siblings: Fiction and Poetry Celebrating Scientists of Marginalized Genders (Atthis Arts, 2023)
- Transcendent 4: The Year's Best Transgender Speculative Fiction 2018 (Lethe Press, 2019)
- Transcendent 3: The Year's Best Transgender Speculative Fiction 2017 (Lethe Press, 2018)
- Transcendent 2: The Year's Best Transgender Speculative Fiction 2016 (Lethe Press, 2017)
- Inkscrawl (2015–2016)
- Stone Telling Magazine (2015) with R. B. Lemberg and Shweta Narayan

=== Novels ===
- Song of Spores (Broken Eye), 2025

=== Novellas ===
- Power to Yield - Clarkesworld Magazine, July 2020

=== Novelettes ===
- "The 1st Interspecies Solidarity Fair and Parade" (first published in Rebuilding Tomorrow edited by Tsana Dolichva, published by Twelfth Planet Press, 2020)
- "Empathic Mirroring" (part 1 of The Song of Spores serial, first published in Eyedolon edited by Scott Gable, published by Broken Eye Books, 2018)
- "Defend Hearth Position" (part 2 of The Song of Spores serial, first published in Eyedolon #2, edited by Scott Gable, published by Broken Eye Books, 2018)
- "The Souls of Those Gone Astray from the Path" (first published in Dracula: Rise of the Beast edited by David Thomas Moore, published by Abaddon Books, 2018)
- "Standing on the Floodbanks" (first published in GigaNotoSaurus edited by Rashida J. Smith, 2016)
- "Three Partitions" (first published in GigaNotoSaurus, edited by Ann Leckie, 2014)

=== Short stories ===
- "Construction Sacrifice" (first published in Lightspeed Magazine edited by John Joseph Adams, published by Adamant Press, 2023)
- "Cyclic Amplification, Meaning Family" (first published in Life Beyond Us edited by Susan Forest, Lucas K Law, and Julia Novakova, published by Laska Media Groups Inc, 2023)
- "Four Glass Cubes (Item Description)" (first published in Baffling Magazine edited by Craig L Gidney and dave ring, published by Neon Hemlock Press, 2022)
- "Folded into Tendril and Leaf" (first published in Xenocultivars: Stories of Queer Growth edited by Isabela Oliveira and Jed Sabin, published by Speculatively Queer, 2022)
- "The Hidden Knowledge Society" (first published in Seasons Between Us: Tales of Identities and Memories edited by Susan Forest and Lucas K Law, published by Laksa Media, 2021)
- "A Technical Term, Like Privilege" (first published in Whether Change: The Revolution Will Be Weird edited by C. Dombrowski and Scott Gable, published by Broken Eye Books, 2021)
- "Veruska and the Lúdvérc" (first published in Eurasian Monsters edited by Margrét Helgadóttir, published by Fox Spirit Books, 2020)

=== Short story collection ===
- The Trans Space Octopus Congregation (Lethe Press, 2019) ISBN 9781590216934
- Power to Yield and Other Stories (Broken Eye Books, 2024) ISBN 9781940372662

=== Poetry collection ===
- Algorithmic Shapeshifting (Aqueduct Press, 2019)
