= Into the Riverlands =

2022 fantasy novella by Nghi Vo

- Author: Nghi Vo
- Language: English
- Series: Singing Hills Cycle #3
- Genre: Fantasy
- Publisher: Tordotcom
- Publication date: October 25, 2022
- Publication place: United States
- Media type: Print
- Pages: 112 pp.
- ISBN: 978-1-250-85142-0
- Preceded by: When the Tiger Came Down the Mountain
- Followed by: Mammoths at the Gates
- Website: https://nghivo.com/novellas/into-the-riverlands

Into the Riverlands is a 2022 fantasy novella by Nghi Vo. It is the third published entry in the Singing Hills Cycle. Each novella can serve as an entry point to the series or as a standalone tale.

The novella explores questions of authenticity, truth, and storytelling. It received critical acclaim, winning the 2023 Ignyte Award for Best Novella and earning nominations for the 2023 Hugo Award for Best Novella and Nebula Award for Best Novella.

== Plot ==
Cleric Chih journeys into the contested territory of the riverlands with their talking bird, Almost Brilliant. They travel with martial artist Wei Jintai; her sworn sister, Mac Sang; a middle-aged woman named Lao Bingyi; and Bingyi's husband Mac Khanh. Lao Bingyi and Mac Khanh are returning to their home town of Betony Docks, and the others are going the same direction.

As they walk, Wei Jintai tells stories about the riverlands and their history. The stories include tales of the Hollow Hand, a group of bandits which once controlled the area. They once attacked a young maiden of the Nie family by cutting her throat, and the infuriated martial artist the Shaking Earth Master then destroyed the Hollow Hand. Sang, a self-proclaimed “ugly woman”, tells stories about heroines who don't follow traditional standards of beauty. At their first campsite, the group discovers a hanging body with a white handprint on its chest, indicating that the Hollow Hand has returned. They bury the body and set a watch.

That night, Khanh tells Chih a story about Wild Pig Yi, a fearsome brawler. In this story, she and her companions, Gravewraith Chen and the Beautiful Nie, defeated the Hollow Hand. Chih and their companions leave their campsite the next morning and are attacked by bandits on the road. Lao Bingyi, Khanh, and Wei Jintai fight them off with extreme martial skill. They spend the night camping, once again setting watch. Lao Bingyi shares her poor opinion on a famous opera, The Cruel Wife of Master See.

They spend most of the following day traveling without interruption, and arrive at Betony Docks to find the town is being attacked. Lao Bingyi, Khanh, and Wei Jintai join the battle, while Chih shelters with the elderly and the town's children in a large building supported on pylons over the river. The bandits break down the door and confront the town's leader, Master Nie. He triggers a booby trap, collapsing part of the building into the river and killing the bandits. Master Nie recognizes Chih as a cleric of the Singing Hills, and asks them to enter him in their records as being 'beautiful'. Master Nie reunites with his partners Bingyi and Khanh, and the townspeople begin to care for the dead and injured and assess damage to the town. The following morning, Chih and Bingyi are bathing in the river. Chih notices that Bingyi has a large scar across her throat. The two travelers discuss the concept of telling stories; Bingyi states that her story is her own and she will not share it. Chih agrees to wait, knowing that the truth will be revealed in the future.

== Major themes ==
Ai Jiang of Strange Horizons writes that Into the Riverlands "highlights the duality of reality and stories, the ways in which stories are told, experienced, and consumed, their truths and falsehoods, and how they help piece together the past." The review further states that:

The difference between witnessing legends as they are created firsthand and simply passing them on as retold stories, recording them as heard from others, is further emphasized by Chih’s thoughts: “I’ll remember that I was terrified […] I’ll remember what it was like to see a battle between people who don’t fight like people, who are what legends come from” (p. 93). Again, Chih reflects further on this by saying, “‘Maybe you get told about it two or three times, and you just don’t know what you’re hearing’” (p. 105). There is a shift in the passing-on of stories and legends from the oral form to written when Chih decides to record by hand the stories they hear rather than have Almost Brilliant store them by memory, which brings us to contemplate the way we store, experience, and talk about memories now.

== Reception ==
Publishers Weekly gave the novella a starred review, calling it a "pitch-perfect series installment" and praising Vo's characterization, offering "a deeper understanding of Chih themself, a character who may have been left as a framing device in lesser hands." A review in Cyprus Mail praised the installment for its themes of authenticity and storytelling, writing that Vo explores "how far others have any right to one’s personal histories. Is it more important to preserve truth or privacy and personal integrity?" The review states that this is a "lesson worth learning, and a book worth reading." Gary K. Wolfe wrote in his review for Locus that "there seems to be a much larger narrative lurking just beneath the surface, as Chih’s world continues to unfold in often unexpected ways." Wolfe states that "Chih and Almost Brilliant are a delightfully engaging pair, and I’d be glad to revisit them anytime."

== Awards ==
| Year | Award | Category | Result | Ref. |
|---|---|---|---|---|
| 2023 | Hugo Award | Novella | Finalist | |
| 2023 | Ignyte Award | Novella | Won | |
| 2023 | Lambda Literary Awards | Speculative Fiction | Finalist | |
| 2023 | Locus Award | Novella | Finalist | |
