= R. B. Lemberg =

Ukrainian-American speculative fiction author (born 1976)

- Р. Б. Лемберґ
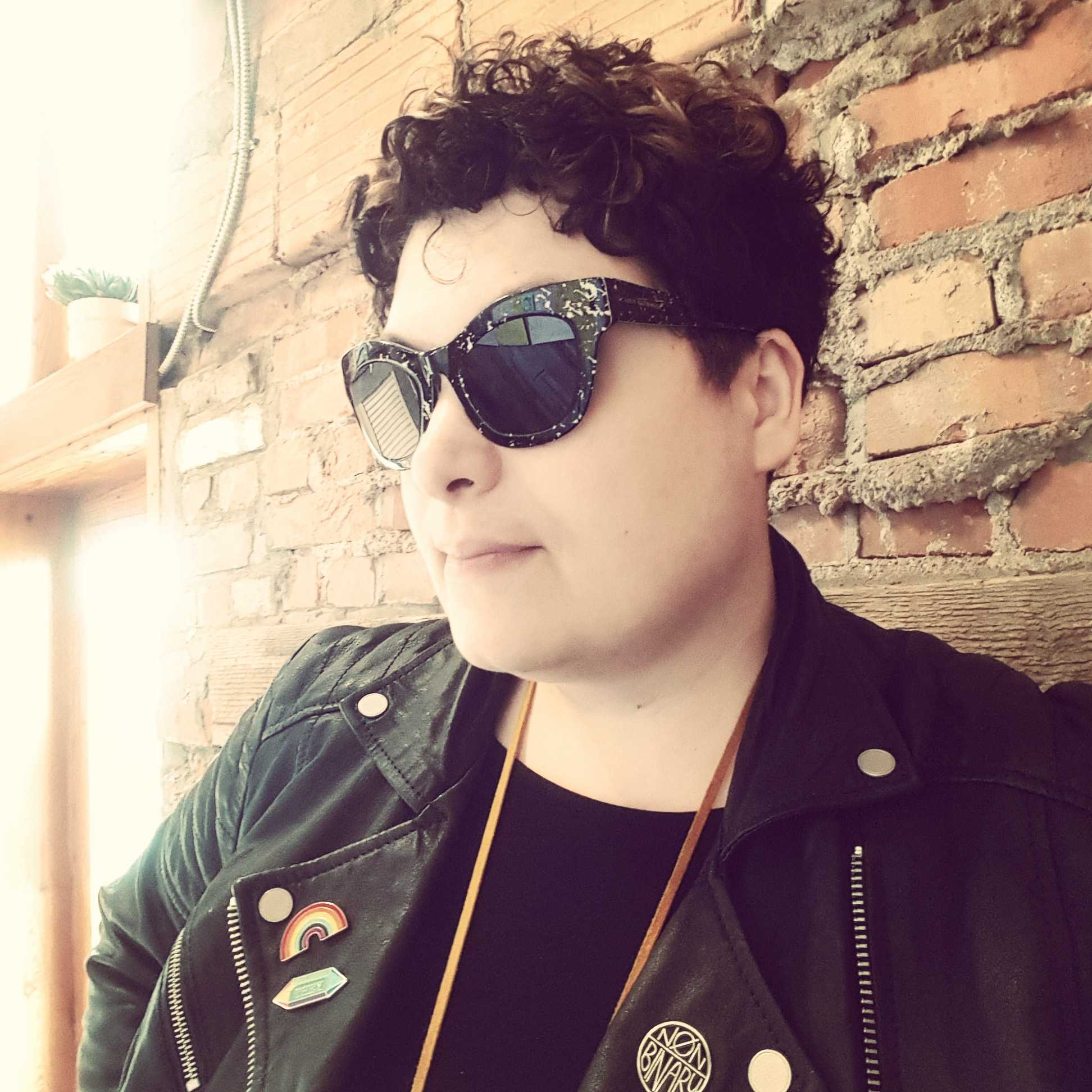
- Born: Rouz Lemberg; September 27, 1976 (age 49); Lviv, Ukrainian SSR, Soviet Union (now Ukraine)
- Education: University of California, Berkeley
- Occupations: Author; Professor of Sociolinguistics
- Spouse: Bogi Takács
- Writing career
- Genres: Science fiction; fantasy; poetry; essays
- Notable works: The Four Profound Weaves (2020); The Unbalancing (2022)
- Website: rblemberg.net

R. B. Lemberg (Note: Ukrainian: Р. Б. Лемберґ, romanized: R. B. Lemberg) (born Rose Lemberg, (Note: Ukrainian: Роуз Лемберґ, romanized: Rouz Lemberg) September 27, 1976) is an author, poet, and editor of speculative fiction. Their (Note: Lemberg's preferred pronoun is singular they, which this article uses.) work has been distributed in publications such as Lightspeed, Strange Horizons, Beneath Ceaseless Skies, and Uncanny Magazine, and stories have been featured in anthologies such as Sisters of the Revolution: A Feminist Speculative Fiction Anthology and Transcendent 3: The Year's Best Transgender Speculative Fiction 2017 .

Lemberg is queer, bigender, and autistic. Many of Lemberg's stories and poems are situated in Birdverse, an LGBTQIA+-focused secondary world. Their debut Birdverse novella The Four Profound Weaves was published by Tachyon in 2020 and was a finalist for the 2021 World Fantasy, Nebula, Locus, and Ignyte awards for Best Novella and was on the Honor List for the Otherwise Award. Their first Birdverse novel, The Unbalancing was published by Tachyon in 2022, was a finalist for the Locus Award. Their second novella, The Yoke of Stars, was published by Tachyon in 2024, and is a finalist for the 2025 World Fantasy Award. Lemberg's work has also been a finalist for the Nebula, Crawford, and other awards. Their Birdverse short fiction collection Geometries of Belonging: Stories & Poems From the Birdverse was published by Fairwood Press in late 2022, and include a previously unpublished story, "Where Your Quince Trees Grow".

== Biography ==
Lemberg was born in L'viv, Ukraine on September 27, 1976. They lived in Russia and Israel before emigrating to the United States for graduate school at University of California, Berkeley.

In their academic life, Lemberg is a professor of sociolinguistics working on immigrant discourse, identity, and gender.

Lemberg lives in Lawrence, Kansas, with their spouse, Bogi Takács (who is also queer, transgender, and Eastern European Jewish) and their child.

== Career ==
Lemberg is the founding editor of Stone Telling, a magazine of speculative poetry that debuted in 2010 and was named for the main characters in Ursula K. Le Guin's novel Always Coming Home. In 2012, they collected and edited Here, We Cross (An Anthology of Queer and Genderfluid Poetry from Stone Telling 1–7) from the works published in the early issues of Stone Telling, and edited The Moment of Change: An Anthology of Feminist Speculative Poetry. In 2016, they edited the short fiction anthology An Alphabet of Embers: An Anthology of Unclassifiables, which focused on short fiction works that defied classification by genre. In 2021, as a tribute following the passing of Ursula K. Le Guin in 2018, Lemberg, and co-editor Lisa Bradley, edited Climbing Lightly Through Forests: A Poetry Anthology Honoring Ursula K. Le Guin.

Lemberg's poetry has been published in Strange Horizons, Goblin Fruit, Uncanny Magazine, Fireside Magazine, Apex Magazine and many others. Their poetry has won the Strange Horizons Readers' Poll multiple times: "In the Third Cycle" in 2011, "Between the Mountain and the Moon" in 2012, and "Ranra's Unbalancing" in 2015. Their poem, "I will show you a single treasure from the treasures of Shah Niya", came in third place for the 2014 Rhysling Award in the Long Poem category. Their debut poetry collection, Marginalia to Stone Bird was shortlisted for the 2017 Crawford Award and was a finalist for the 2017 and 2018 Elgin Awards. Their poetry memoir, Everything Thaws, which recalls Lemberg's early life in the Soviet Union and their migrations to Israel and the United States, was published in 2023 by Ben Yehuda Press.

Lemberg was awarded the 2020 Le Guin Feminist Science Fiction Fellowship, sponsored by the University of Oregon Libraries Special Collections and University Archives, which gave them access to many of Le Guin's archives. On Lemberg's website, they revealed that their project for the Fellowship, for which the archival research was delayed by the COVID-19 pandemic, was primarily focused on Le Guin's poetry, which they previously discussed in their essay “The Poetry of Ursula K. Le Guin: A Retrospective” and appeared in Climbing Lightly Through Forests: A Poetry Anthology Honoring Ursula K. Le Guin.

During the 2022 Russian invasion of Ukraine, Lemberg translated works by Ukrainian poets for Chytomo, Springhouse Journal, and National Translation Month's Ukrainian Poetry in Translation Special Feature - Part II.

Lemberg's short fiction has been published in Lightspeed, Strange Horizons, Beneath Ceaseless Skies, Sisters of the Revolution: A Feminist Speculative Fiction Anthology, Uncanny Magazine, Daily Science Fiction, Transcendent 3: The Year's Best Transgender Speculative Fiction 2017, and others. Many of these stories are situated in their LGBTQIA+-focused secondary world, Birdverse. Their Birdverse novelette, "Grandmother-nai-Laylit's Cloth of Winds", was a finalist for the 2015 Nebula Award Finalist for Best Novelette and on the long list for the 2015 Tiptree Award. In 2020, their Birdverse novella, The Four Profound Weaves, was published by Tachyon to critical and reader acclaim, including a starred review and selection as a weekly pick by Publishers Weekly and a starred review from Library Journal. The Four Profound Weaves was a finalist for the 2021 World Fantasy Award, Nebula Award, Locus Award, and Ignyte Award for Best Novella, and was on the Honor List for the Otherwise Award.

Lemberg's debut Birdverse novel, The Unbalancing, an expansion of the story of their poem "Ranra's Unbalancing", was published by Tachyon in 2022 with positive reviews from Library Journal and Publishers Weekly. Their Birdverse collection, Geometries of Belonging: Stories & Poems from the Birdverse, received a starred review from Publishers Weekly ahead of its release from Fairwood Press in late 2022, and notes the inclusion of a new story in the collection, "Where Your Quince Trees Grow", which follows descendants of the main characters from The Unbalancing.

== Awards and nominations ==
Year	Work	Award	Category	Result	Ref
2011	"In the Third Cycle"	Strange Horizons Readers' Poll	—	Won	
2012	"Between the Mountain and the Moon"	Strange Horizons Readers' Poll	—	Won	
2013	"I Will Show You a Single Treasure from the Treasures of Shah Niya"	Rhysling Award	Long Poem	3rd place	
2013	"Ranra's Unbalancing"	Strange Horizons Readers' Poll	—	Won	
2015	"Grandmother-nai-Laylit's Cloth of Winds"	Nebula Award	Novelette	Shortlisted	
2016	Marginalia to Stone Bird	Crawford Award	—	Shortlisted	
2017	Marginalia to Stone Bird	Elgin Awards	—	Shortlisted	
2018	Marginalia to Stone Bird	Elgin Awards	—	Shortlisted	
2020	The Four Profound Weaves	Nebula Award	Novella	Shortlisted	
2021	The Four Profound Weaves	Ignyte Award	Novella	Shortlisted	
2021	The Four Profound Weaves	Locus Award	Novella	Finalist	
2021	The Four Profound Weaves	Otherwise Award	—	Honor List	
2021	The Four Profound Weaves	World Fantasy Award	Novella	Shortlisted	
2021	The Unbalancing	Locus Award	Novel	Finalist	
2022	Geometries of Belonging	Ursula K. Le Guin Prize	—	Shortlisted	
2025	Yoke of Stars	World Fantasy Award	Novella	Won	

== Selected bibliography ==
=== Novels ===
==== Birdverse ====
- —— (2020). The Four Profound Weaves. Tachyon.
- —— (2022). The Unbalancing. Tachyon.
- —— (2024). Yoke of Stars. Tachyon. ISBN 978-1-61696-418-4.

=== Short fiction ===
==== Collections ====
- —— (2022). Geometries of Belonging: Stories & Poems from the Birdverse. Fairwood Press.

==== Birdverse stories ====
Year	Title	Length	First published
2011	"Held Close in Syllables of Light"	Novelette	Beneath Ceaseless Skies #80
2015	"Grandmother-nai-Leylit's Cloth of Winds"	Novelette	Beneath Ceaseless Skies #175
2015	"Geometries of Belonging"	Novelette	Beneath Ceaseless Skies #183
2016	"The Desert Glassmaker and the Jeweler of Berevyar"	Short story	Uncanny Magazine #8
2016	"The Book of How to Live"	Novelette	Beneath Ceaseless Skies #209
2017	"A Splendid Goat Adventure"	Short story	R. B. Lemberg's Patreon
2017	A Portrait of the Desert in Personages of Power	Novella	Beneath Ceaseless Skies, issues 229 and 230 (in two parts)
2018	"The Book of Seed and the Abyss"	Short story	R. B. Lemberg's Patreon
2020	The Four Profound Weaves	Novella	Tachyon
2022	"Where Your Quince Trees Grow"	unknown	Geometries of Belonging: Stories & Poems from the Birdverse, Fairwood Press
2024	Yoke of Stars	Novella	Tachyon

==== Other short fiction ====
Title	Year	Length	First published
"To Balance the Weight of Khalem"	2020	Novelette	Beneath Ceaseless Skies #300
"Luriberg-That-Was"	2019	Short story	Nowhereville: Weird Is Other People, ed. C. Dombrowski and Scott Gable, Broken Eye Books
"These Are the Attributes by Which You Shall Know God"	2018	Short story	GlitterShip, summer 2018
"Retrying"	2017	Short story	Daily Science Fiction
"The Shapes of Us, Translucent to Your Eye"	2015	Short story	The Journal of Unlikely Academia
"How to Remember to Forget to Remember the Old War"	2015	Short story	Lightspeed #61
"Stalemate"	2014	Short story	Lackington's #4
"No Longer Lacking an Onion"	2014	Short story	Goldfish Grimm's Spicy Fiction Sushi, #19
"A City on Its Tentacles"	2014	Short story	Lackington's #1
"Theories of Pain"	2013	Short story	Daily Science Fiction
"Teffeu: A Book From the Library at Taarona"	2013	Short story	Strange Horizons
"Seven Losses of Na Re"	2012	Short story	Daily Science Fiction
"Giant"	2011	unknown	Not One of Us
"Kifli"	2010	Short story	Strange Horizons
"Geddarien"	2008	Short story	Fantasy Magazine, December 2008
"To Find Home Again"	2008	unknown	Warrior Wisewoman, ed. Roby James, Norilana Books

=== Poetry ===
==== Collections ====
- Everything Thaws - Ben Yehuda Press, 2023
- Marginalia to Stone Bird – Aqueduct Press, 2016

==== Birdverse poems ====
Title	Year	First published
"Mirrored Mappings"	2016	Through the Gate
"Ranra's Unbalancing"	2015	Strange Horizons
"Three Principles of Strong Building"	2015	Strange Horizons
"I will show you a single treasure from the treasures of Shah Niyaz"	2013	Goblin Fruit, summer 2013

=== Editor ===
- Climbing Lightly Through Forests: A Poetry Anthology Honoring Ursula K. Le Guin (with Lisa Bradley) - Aqueduct Press, 2021.
- An Alphabet of Embers: An Anthology of Unclassifiables – Stone Bird Press, 2016
- Here, We Cross (An Anthology of Queer and Genderfluid Poetry from Stone Telling 1–7) – Stone Bird Press, 2012.
- The Moment of Change: An Anthology of Feminist Speculative Poetry - Aqueduct Press, 2012.
- Stone Telling magazine, 2010–2016

=== Non-fiction ===
- "Sergeant Bothari and Disability Representation in the Early Vorkosiverse", Strange Horizons, 2018
- "The Uses and Limitations of the Folklorist's Toolkit for Fiction", Strange Horizons, 2015
- "Encouraging Diversity: An Editor's Perspective", Strange Horizons, 2015
- "Not Only a Hero's Journey", with Shweta Narayan, Stone Telling, 2011
- "Silence to Speech", Stone Telling, 2010

== See also ==
- List of fantasy authors
- List of LGBT writers
