= Ignyte Award for Outstanding Novella =

Annual literary award for speculative fiction

- Awarded for: Works between 17,500 - 39,999 words
- Country: United States
- Presented by: FIYAH Literary Magazine
- First award: 2020; 6 years ago
- Most recent winner: Amal El-Mohtar (The River Has Roots)
- Website: ignyteawards.fiyahlitmag.com

The Ignyte Award for Outstanding Novella is a literary award given annually as part of the Ignyte Awards.

== Winners and finalists ==
* Winners

Year	Author	Work	Ref.
2020	Max Gladstone*	This is How You Lose the Time War	
2020	Amal El-Mohtar*	This is How You Lose the Time War	
2020	P. Djèlí Clark	The Haunting of Tram Car 015	
2020	Saad Z. Hossain	The Gurkha and the Lord of Tuesday	
2020	Rivers Solomon	The Deep	
2020	Daveed Diggs	The Deep	
2020	William Hutson	The Deep	
2020	Jonathan Snipes	The Deep	
2020	Tade Thompson	The Survival of Molly Southbourne	
2021	Tochi Onyebuchi*	Riot Baby	
2021	P. Djèlí Clark	Ring Shout	
2021	Eboni Dunbar	Stone and Steel	
2021	R. B. Lemberg	The Four Profound Weaves	
2021	Nghi Vo	The Empress of Salt and Fortune	
2022	Shingai Njeri Kagunda*	And This Is How to Stay Alive	
2022	Aliette de Bodard	Fireheart Tiger	
2022	R. S. A. Garcia	"Philia, Eros, Storge, Agápe, Pragma"	
2022	Cassandra Khaw	Nothing But Blackened Teeth	
2022	Zin E. Rocklyn	Flowers for the Sea	
2023	Nghi Vo*	Into the Riverlands	
2023	Bendi Barrett	Empire of the Feast	
2023	R. S. A. Garcia	"Bishop's Opening"	
2023	C. L. Polk	Even Though I Knew the End	
2023	Naben Ruthnum	Helpmeet	
2024	Moses Ose Utomi*	The Lies of the Ajungo	
2024	E. G. Condé	Sordidez	
2024	A. Z. Louise	Off-Time Jive	
2024	Tiffany Morris	Green Fuse Burning	
2024	Malka Older	The Mimicking of Known Successes	
2025	Suyi Davies Okungbowa*	Lost Ark Dreaming	
2025	Premee Mohamed	The Butcher of the Forest	
2025	Arula Ratnakar	"Fractal Karma"	
2025	Sofia Samatar	The Practice, the Horizon, and the Chain	
2025	A. D. Sui	The Dragonfly Gambit	
2026	Amal El-Mohtar*	The River Has Roots	
2026	Sharang Biswas	The Iron Below Remembers	
2026	Martin Cahill	Audition for the Fox	
2026	Eden Royce	Psychopomp & Circumstance	
2026	Wole Talabi	Descent	
