= Shiokawa =

Shiokawa (Japanese: (塩川) is a Japanese surname.

== People ==
Notable people with the name include:

- Masajuro Shiokawa (塩川 正十郎, 1921–2015), a Japanese politician
- Yūko Shiokawa (塩川 悠子, born 1946), a Japanese violinist
- Michiko Shiokawa (塩川 美知子, born 1951), a Japanese volleyball player
- Tetsuya Shiokawa (塩川 鉄也, born 1961), a Japanese politician
- Taketo Shiokawa (塩川 岳人, born 1977), a Japanese footballer
- Tatsuya Shiokawa (塩川 達也, born 1983), a Japanese baseball player

== Other uses ==
- Shiokawa, Japan, is the fictitious town where the 2023 videogame World of Horror is set
