= The Unbalancing =

2020 fantasy novel by R. B. Lemberg

- Cover art for The Unbalancing
- Author: R. B. Lemberg
- Cover artist: Elizabeth Story
- Language: English
- Series: Birdverse
- Genre: Fantasy; Speculative fiction
- Publisher: Tachyon
- Publication date: 20 September 2022
- Pages: 256
- ISBN: 9781616963804
- OCLC: 1319214679

The Unbalancing is a 2022 LGBT+ fantasy novel by R. B. Lemberg, set in their secondary world, Birdverse. It covers the attempts to save, and ultimate destruction of, the islands of Gelle-Geu due to the increasing instability of the magical Star of the Tides, which resides beneath the waves just off the coast of the archipelago. It includes discussion of gender and sexuality, grief, community, and consent, as well as drawing parallels between inaction surrounding the increasing instability of the Star and inaction on climate change here on Earth. Comparisons have also been drawn between the fall of Gelle-Geu and the fall of Atlantis or the destruction of Pompei. The novel is an expansion of the story originally referenced in the poem "Ranra's Unbalancing", first published in Strange Horizons magazine. The novel was well received by critics and was included on a list of science fiction and fantasy novels by trans and non-binary authors on BuzzFeed.

== Plot ==
The novel is set in Lemberg's secondary world Birdverse, about a thousand years prior to the events of The Four Profound Weaves, on the archipelago Gelle-Geu, and alternates its viewpoint between the two primary characters, Erígra Lilún and Ranra Kekeri. At the start of the novel, the current Starkeeper of the Star of the Tides, a star made up of magical deepnames that resides beneath the waves off the shore of Gelle-Geu, is dying. The Star, also known as the Unquiet Sleeper and the Sputtering Star, has always been fretful and possibly the cause of earthquakes on the islands. Erígra Lilún is autistic and an ichidi, or non-binary person, who has yet to discover their ichidi variation, which is explored throughout the novel. They write poetry, tend an old quince grove, and prefer a quiet life, but the ghost of their ancestor, Semberí, the first Starkeeper of the Star of the Tides, pressures them to connect to the Star and become the next Starkeeper. Semberí tells them the story of the Birdcoming, when the goddess Bird came from beyond the sky and brought the twelve Stars to the world, dancing in the sky above the great Burri desert until the Stars fell from her tail to the first Starkeepers waiting below. Lilún does not wish to become Starkeeper and resists Semberí's pressure so that when the current Starkeeper passes, another is chosen as the new Keeper, Ranra Kekeri. Lilún attends the ascension party for the new Starkeeper and meets Ranra for the first time, a woman with a much bolder personality than Lilún, and who captivates them from their first meeting. Lilún and Ranra discuss the increasingly unstable nature of the Star and the growing hazard the situation presents to the islands, but have differing opinions of how it should be handled.

Lilún and Ranra's attraction to one another grows into a romance that is often challenged and interrupted by the increasing instability of the Star, which causes earthquakes of increasing frequency that rattle the islands, and they must combine their efforts to find a way to calm the Star. During one such earthquake, they discover a way to link their deepnames and increase their available power to try and stabilize the land and protect the lives of those around them. Lilún continues to visit the quince grove and learn more of the story of the Birdcoming, learning more about the Star of the Tides each time. As the stability of the islands worsens, Ranra has her advisor, Ulár, chart a way to connect many people with magical deepnames to build enough power to calm the Star. Meanwhile, Dorod, a deepname strong and friend of Lilún, explains they have a backup plan in case the islands fall. They have built large trade ships that can be used to evacuate some of the people from the islands if necessary, but they are not large enough for all. Lilún continues to advocate for healing the Star, and they research ways to go about this with Ranra, but as the situation grows increasingly desperate and the Mother Mountain begins to erupt, the connection of peoples' deepnames is determined to be the best hope. When Ranra attempts to use the power given to her by this connection, she learns the true nature of the Star, and her efforts are unable to heal it before disaster strikes.

== Major themes ==
The novel includes a meditation on gender, particularly on the various ways one can consider non-binary identities, as Lilún explores and considers their own ichidi variation. In the culture of Gelle-Geu, ichidi display that they are such by wearing five braids in their hair, but there are several variations of ichidi, which can be indicated by weaving tokens into the hairstyle. These variations include: ichar, symbolized by a deer for "I leap sideways-to signal that one was neither a man nor a woman, but traveling sideways on one's own path"; arír, symbolized by a fish for "I frolic in a stream" or "moving gracefully between the different gendered states"; rugár, symbolized by a bear for "I am both bears" or "strength and groundedness in the worlds of women and men, belonging to neither"; and zúr, symbolized by a turtle for "when others rush to divide and declare, I carry my world" or "the distinctions between women, ichidi, and men [do] not make sense".

The novel also draws a parallel between the impending destruction of the islands with the hazards of climate change. The prior Starkeeper to Ranra, Terein, tried to sound the alarm about the state of the Star but was rebuffed and mocked so strongly, he withdrew completely and gave up any hope of intervention. Even in the face of the eruption of Mother Mountain, there are those on the islands who refuse to believe the situation is serious, saying that the mountain has erupted before and that people are just exaggerating the seriousness of the situation. The destruction of the island has also led some to compare it to the story of the fall of Atlantis.

The novel also explores grief, community, and consent. In an interview with The Fantasy Hive, Lemberg spoke about how Birdverse is inspired by their "fascination with historical linguistics, ancient and medieval trade routes, medieval and early modern Jewish history, and literally anything associated with the linguistics of gender" and several themes from Judaism have been noted by readers of the novel, including both symbolism and specific items referenced in the novel, such as a shofar.

== Development history ==
Lemberg's poem, "Ranra's Unbalancing", was published in Strange Horizons in 2015 which tells the tale of Ranra's grief at being unable to save her land and the lengths to which she went to try, as she and the survivors sailed away in hopes of starting again. In the acknowledgements at the back of The Unbalancing, Lemberg talks about how the characters in the poem stayed with them and how the COVID-19 pandemic and the sudden, tragic loss of their close friend, Corey Alexander, pushed them to finally expand the story of the poem into a novel.

== Reception ==
Publishers Weekly called it "bittersweet and lovely" and noted that "brisk action balances the meditations on gender and glimpses of the complex magic system". Kristi Chadwick of Library Journal said it "showcases elegant and lyrical prose to create an immersive romantic fantasy". A review from Booklist praised the "dreamlike" prose and character arcs, concluding that the book was "lovingly crafted with a deep and rewarding world full of complex characters who are often LGBTQIA+ and/or neurodiverse". It was also included on a list of "26 Science Fiction and Fantasy Novels by Trans and Nonbinary Authors" at BuzzFeed during Pride Month in 2022 ahead of its publication, noting that "[i]n all their fiction from the fascinating Birdverse world, Lemberg centers marginalized identities: queer, trans, neurodiverse, elderly, and more".
