= Nghi Vo =

American author (born 1981)

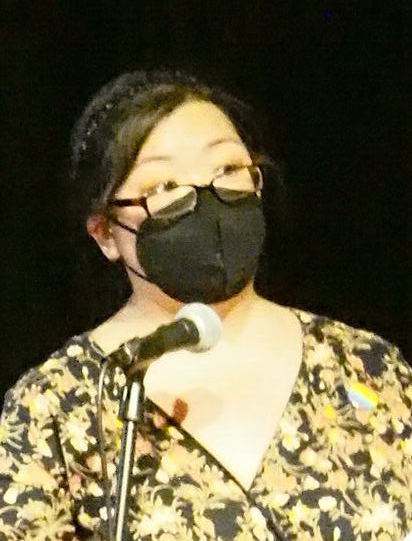
- Nghi Vo in 2025
- Born: December 4, 1981 (age 44); Peoria, Illinois, U.S.
- Writing career
- Language: English
- Years active: 2007–present
- Genres: Fantasy; LGBT
- Notable awards: Hugo Award for Best Novella (2020); Crawford Award (2021); Hugo Award for Best Short Story (2025)
- Website: nghivo.com

Nghi Vo (born December 4, 1981) is an American author of short stories, novellas, and novels. Vo's fantasy novella The Empress of Salt and Fortune has received acclaim and won the Hugo Award for Best Novella and the IAFA Crawford Award.

== Biography ==
Vo was born in Peoria, Illinois, where she lived until attending college at the University of Illinois Urbana–Champaign. In 2007 she moved to Milwaukee, Wisconsin on the shores of Lake Michigan. She identifies as bisexual and queer.

Vo's first published short story was "Gift of Flight" in 2007, after which she published a number of short stories in various media. In 2020 Vo published the novella The Empress of Salt and Fortune, which won the Hugo Award for Best Novella and the 2021 IAFA Crawford Award. The book was also a finalist for the Locus and the Ignyte Award. This novella was the first entry in the Singing Hills Cycle, which comprises seven works as of 2026.

Her debut novel, The Chosen and the Beautiful, was published in 2021. The novel is a queer fantasy adaptation of The Great Gatsby. It reimagines the character of Jordan Baker as a woman of Vietnamese descent who was taken to Louisville as a young child and raised by a wealthy, white American family. In April 2025, she published Don't Sleep with the Dead, a companion novella more focused on Nick Carraway.

Vo's second novel, Siren Queen, an urban fantasy set in pre-Code Hollywood, was released in May 2022.

== Awards ==
Year	Work	Award	Category	Result	Ref.
2015	"Neither Witch nor Fairy"	James Tiptree Jr. Award	—	Honor List	
2020	The Empress of Salt and Fortune	Goodreads Choice Awards	Fantasy	Finalist	
2021	The Empress of Salt and Fortune	Crawford Award	—	Won	
2021	The Empress of Salt and Fortune	Hugo Award	Novella	Won	
2021	The Empress of Salt and Fortune	Ignyte Awards	Novella	Finalist	
2021	The Empress of Salt and Fortune	Locus Award	Novella	Finalist	
2022	The Chosen and the Beautiful	Locus Award	First Novel	Finalist	
2022	"What the Dead Know"	Shirley Jackson Award	Novelette	Won	
2022	When the Tiger Came Down the Mountain	RUSA CODES Reading List	Fantasy	Shortlisted	
2023	Into the Riverlands	Hugo Award	Novella	Finalist	
2023	Into the Riverlands	Ignyte Awards	Novella	Won	
2023	Into the Riverlands	Lambda Literary Awards	Speculative Fiction	Finalist	
2023	Into the Riverlands	Locus Award	Novella	Finalist	
2023	Mammoths at the Gates	Nebula Award	Novella	Finalist	
2023	Siren Queen	Ignyte Award	Adult Novel	Finalist	
2023	Siren Queen	Locus Award	Fantasy Novel	Finalist	
2023	Siren Queen	World Fantasy Award	Novel	Finalist	
2024	Mammoths at the Gates	Hugo Award	Novella	Finalist	
2024	Mammoths at the Gates	Locus Award	Novella	Finalist	
2024	Mammoths at the Gates	Ursula K. Le Guin Prize	—	Shortlisted	
2024	Mammoths at the Gates	World Fantasy Award	Novella	Finalist	
2024	"On the Fox Roads"	Hugo Award	Novelette	Finalist	
2024	"On the Fox Roads"	Locus Award	Novelette	Finalist	
2024	"Silk and Cotton and Linen and Blood"	World Fantasy Award	Short Fiction	Finalist	
2024	The City in Glass	Los Angeles Times Book Prize	Science Fiction, Fantasy, and Speculative Fiction	Finalist	
2025	The City in Glass	Locus Award	Fantasy Novel	Finalist	
2025	The City in Glass	Mythopoeic Award	Adult Literature	Finalist	
2025	The City in Glass	Ursula K. Le Guin Prize	—	Shortlisted	
2025	The Brides of High Hill	Hugo Award	Novella	Finalist	
2025	The Brides of High Hill	Locus Award	Novella	Finalist	
2025	"Stitched to Skin Like Family Is"	Hugo Award	Short Story	Won	
2025	"Stitched to Skin Like Family Is"	Locus Award	Short Story	Finalist	
2026	A Mouthful of Dust	Locus Award	Novella	Finalist	
2026	A Mouthful of Dust	World Fantasy Award	Long Fiction	Shortlisted	

== Bibliography ==
=== Singing Hills Cycle novellas ===
1. — (24 Mar 2020). The Empress of Salt and Fortune. Tordotcom. ISBN 9781250750303.
2. — (8 Dec 2020). When the Tiger Came Down the Mountain. Tordotcom. ISBN 9781250786135.
3. — (25 Oct 2022). Into the Riverlands. Tordotcom. ISBN 9781250851420.
4. — (12 Sep 2023). Mammoths at the Gates. Tordotcom. ISBN 9781250851437.
5. — (7 May 2024). The Brides of High Hill. Tordotcom. ISBN 9781250851444.
6. — (7 Oct 2025). A Mouthful of Dust. Tordotcom. ISBN 9781250386403.
7. — (5 May 2026). A Long and Speaking Silence. Tordotcom. ISBN 9781250386427.
8. — (4 May 2027). The Judgment of Needles. Tordotcom. ISBN 9781250386441.

=== The Chosen and the Beautiful ===
- — (1 Jun 2021). The Chosen and the Beautiful. Tor Books. ISBN 9781250784780.
- — (8 Apr 2025). Don't Sleep with the Dead. Tordotcom. ISBN 9781250362612.

=== Standalone novels ===
- — (10 May 2022). Siren Queen. Tor Books. ISBN 9781250788832.
- — (1 Oct 2024). The City in Glass. Tordotcom. ISBN 9781250348272.
- — (6 Oct 2026). The Scarlet Ball. Tor Books. ISBN 9781250904966.

=== Short fiction ===
- — (11 Jun 2007). "Gift of Flight". Strange Horizons.
- — (21 May 2012). "Tiger Stripes". Strange Horizons.
- — (15 Oct 2012). "Dinner at Majak's". Innsmouth Free Press. No. 11.
- — (Feb 2013). "In Shadows Cast by Moonlight". Crossed Genres Magazine. No. 2.
- — (Nov 2013). "Pompilid". The Journey of Unlikely Entomology. No. 7. Illustrated by Pauline De Hoe. Unlikely Story.
- — (30 Jan 2014). "Neither Witch Nor Fairy". In Fox, Rose; Older, Daniel José (eds.). Long Hidden: Speculative Fiction from the Margins of History. Crossed Genres Publications. ISBN 9780991392100.
- — (20 Mar 2014). "A Memory of White Flowers". In Andrew, Jason; Empson, Mae (eds.). The Future Embodied: Evolution of the Human Body. Simian Publishing. ISBN 9780979422119.
- — (1 Aug 2014). "Ghosts of Emerhad". In Berman, Steve (ed.). Wilde Stories 2014: The Year's Best Gay Speculative Fiction. Lethe Press. ISBN 9781590215036.
- — (30 Mar 2015). "In Chains Lighter Than Air". In Zaglanis, Charles P. (ed.). Airships & Automatons. White Cat Publications. ISBN 9780988244634.
- — (5 Jan 2016). "Lotus Face and the Fox". Uncanny Magazine. No. 8.
- — (Apr 2016). "Dragon Brides". Lightspeed. No. 71. Art by Sam Schechter.
- — (20 Sep 2016). "The Ghost Years". PodCastle (Podcast). No. 434. Audio produced by Pria Wood. Hosted by Graeme Dunlop. Narrated by Tatiana Gomberg.
- — (4 Sep 2017). "Twelve Pictures from a Second World War". Strange Horizons.
- — (11 Apr 2019). "Boiled Bones and Black Eggs". Beneath Ceaseless Skies. No. 275.
- — (Jun 2019). Rios, Julia; Parker, Chelle (eds.). "Five Stories in the Monsoon Night". Fireside Magazine. Illustrated by Ora Xu.
- — (14 Mar 2023). "Silk and Cotton and Linen and Blood". In Shawl, Nisi (ed.). New Suns 2: Original Speculative Fiction by People of Color. Solaris Books. ISBN 9781786188588.
- — (5 Mar 2024). "Stitched to Skin like Family Is". Uncanny Magazine. No. 57.
