= Ignyte Award for Outstanding Speculative Poetry =

Annual literary award for speculative fiction

- Awarded for: Single poems which are speculative in genre
- Country: United States
- Presented by: FIYAH Literary Magazine
- First award: 2020; 6 years ago
- Most recent winner: Angela Liu ("The Language of Fireflies")
- Website: ignyteawards.fiyahlitmag.com

The Ignyte Award for Outstanding Speculative Poetry is a literary award given annually as part of the Ignyte Awards.

== Winners and finalists ==
* Winners

| Year | Author | Work | Publisher | Ref. |
|---|---|---|---|---|
| 2020 | Woody Dismukes* | "A Conversation Between the Embalmed Heads of Lampião and Maria Bonita on Public Display at the Baiano State Forensic Institute, Circa Mid-20th Century" | Strange Horizons, September 2019 | |
| 2020 | Davian Aw | "Those Who Tell the Stories" | Strange Horizons, October 2019 | |
| 2020 | Tamara Jerée | "goddess in forced repose" | Uncanny Magazine, September-October 2019 | |
| 2020 | Brandon O'Brien | "Elegy for the Self as Villeneuve's Beast" | Uncanny Magazine, May-June 2019 | |
| 2020 | Ruben Reyes Jr. | "Heaven Is Expensive" | Strange Horizons, September 2019 | |
| 2021 | Gabriel Ascencio Morales* (author) | "The Harrowing | Desgarrador" | Strange Horizons, November 2020 | |
| 2021 | Juan Martínez* (translator) | "The Harrowing | Desgarrador" | Strange Horizons, November 2020 | |
| 2021 | Renoir Gaither | "The Alt-history of King Kong" | Speculative City, Fall 2020 | |
| 2021 | Terese Mason Pierre | "Fin" | Uncanny Magazine, September-October 2020 | |
| 2021 | Millie Ho | "Hungry Ghost" | Uncanny Magazine, March-April 2020 | |
| 2021 | Raúl Gallardo Flores (author) | "Tequila Mockingbird | Matar un Ruiseñor" | Strange Horizons, November 2020 | |
| 2021 | Juan Martínez (translator) | "Tequila Mockingbird | Matar un Ruiseñor" | Strange Horizons, November 2020 | |
| 2022 | Abu Bakr Sadiq* | "Post Massacre Psyche Evaluation" | Uncanny Magazine, November-December 2021 | |
| 2022 | Priya Chand | "Dragonslayer" | Fantasy, March 2021 | |
| 2022 | Arden Eli Hill | "None of the Star Trek Ships Are Named After Confederate Generals" | Strange Horizons, May 2021 | |
| 2022 | Jack Kin Lim | "Kuala Lumpur Urban Legends" | Strange Horizons, August 2021 | |
| 2022 | Terese Mason Pierre | "Appeal to the Doppelgänger" | Fantasy, April 2021 | |
| 2023 | Ai Jiang* | "We Smoke Pollution" | STAR*LINE, Winter 2022 | |
| 2023 | jason b. crawford | Year of the Unicorn Kidz | Sundress Publications | |
| 2023 | Monique Collins | "The Recipe for Time Travel" | FIYAH, June 2022 | |
| 2023 | Beatrice Winifred Iker | "I Shall Not Surrender" | Anathema, August 2022 | |
| 2023 | Terese Mason Pierre | "In Stock Images of the Future, Everything is White" | Uncanny Magazine, May-June 2022 | |
| 2024 | Akua Lezli Hope* | "My Mother, she ate me" | FIYAH, Winter 2023 | |
| 2024 | Rasha Abdulhadi | "Helen after Helen" | Apparition Lit, April 2023 | |
| 2024 | Nwuguru Chidiebere Sullivan | "Alternate Rooms" | Nightmare Magazine, March 2023 | |
| 2024 | Nwuguru Chidiebere Sullivan | "Imported Entry into an Android Cosmos" | FIYAH, Fall 2023 | |
| 2024 | Claudia Vaca (author) | "Aborteras del Viejo Mundo | Aborting the Old World" | Samovar, February 2023 | |
| 2024 | Brittany Hause (translator) | "Aborteras del Viejo Mundo | Aborting the Old World" | Samovar, February 2023 | |
| 2025 | Fasasi Ridwan* | "reliving: post trauma of the lekki tollgate massacre." | Strange Horizons, December 2024 | |
| 2025 | leena aboutaleb | "Hijacked Interiors" | Strange Horizons, January 2024 | |
| 2025 | Sourav Roy (author) | "I Said | मैंने कहा" | Samovar, July 2024 | |
| 2025 | Carol D’Souza (translator) | "I Said | मैंने कहा" | Samovar, July 2024 | |
| 2025 | P. H. Low | "After they blasted your home planet to shrapnel" | Haven Spec, March 2025 | |
| 2025 | Bogi Takács | "The Person Who Reminds the Other Person to Cast a Spell" | Strange Horizons, December 2024 | |
| 2026 | Angela Liu* | "The Language of Fireflies" | The Deadlands, February 2025 | |
| 2026 | Ryu Ando 安堵 龍 | "The oblique light at Kakushima (a memory of persimmons)" | Strange Horizons, February 2025 | |
| 2026 | Nova Cypress Black | "Set It Off (1996) – Fans’ Cut" | Strange Horizons, June 2025 | |
| 2026 | Karan Kapoor | "In an attempt to seduce Death my sister starts calling him Love" | Strange Horizons, February 2025 | |
| 2026 | Ishita Basu Mallik | "After the Storm" | The Deadlands, May 2025 | |
