= Cassandra Khaw =

Malaysian author (born 1984)

- Born: Zoe Khor-Thu Ee; August 31, 1984 (age 42); Malaysia

Cassandra Khaw (born 31 August 1984) is a Malaysian writer of horror and science fiction. They also create video games and tabletop games, and formerly wrote about them as a games and tech journalist.

== Biography ==
Cassandra Khaw was born in Malaysia on 31 August 1984 as Zoe Khor-Thu Ee. They work as a horror and science fiction writer for video games, tabletop RPGs, short stories, and novels. Their articles and stories have been published in such magazines as Tor.com, Clarkesworld, Fireside Fiction, Uncanny Magazine, and Nature. Their video game writing appears in Eurogamer, Ars Technica, The Verge, and Engadget. Khaw has stated they use they/them pronouns.

== Awards and nominations ==
Year	Work	Award	Category	Result	Ref.
2017	Hammers on Bone	British Fantasy Award	Best Novella	Shortlisted	
2017	Hammers on Bone	Locus Award	Best Novella	Finalist	
2018	Food of the Gods	Locus Award	Best Horror Novel	Finalist	
2021	Nothing but Blackened Teeth	Bram Stoker Award	Best Long Fiction	Nominated	
2021	Nothing but Blackened Teeth	Shirley Jackson Award	Best Novel	Finalist	
2022	Nothing but Blackened Teeth	British Fantasy Award	Best Horror Novel (August Derleth Award)	Shortlisted	
2022	Nothing but Blackened Teeth	Ignyte Award	Best Novella	Finalist	
2022	Nothing but Blackened Teeth	RUSA CODES Reading List	Horror	Won	
2022	Nothing but Blackened Teeth	World Fantasy Award	Best Novella	Nominated	
2022	The All-Consuming World	Locus Award	Best First Novel	Finalist	
2022	Breakable Things	Bram Stoker Award	Best Fiction Collection	Won	
2022	Breakable Things	Shirley Jackson Award	Best Single-Author Collection	Nominated	
2023	Breakable Things	British Fantasy Award	Best Collection	Shortlisted	
2023	Breakable Things	Locus Award	Best Collection	Finalist	
2023	Breakable Things	World Fantasy Award	Best Collection	Nominated	
2023	The Salt Grows Heavy	Bram Stoker Award	Best Long Fiction	Nominated	
2023	The Salt Grows Heavy	Shirley Jackson Award	Best Novella	Nominated	
2024	The Salt Grows Heavy	Locus Award	Best Novella	Finalist	
2024	The Dead Take the A Train	Dragon Award	Best Horror Novel	Nominated	
2026	The Library at Hellebore	Locus Award	Horror Novel	Finalist	

== Bibliography ==
=== Novels ===
- The All-Consuming World (2021)
- The Dead Take the A Train (with Richard Kadrey) (2023)
- Critical Role: Bells Hells–What Doesn't Break (2024)
- The Library at Hellebore (2025)

==== Gods & Monsters: Rupert Wong ====
- Rupert Wong, Cannibal Chef (2015)
- Rupert Wong and the Ends of the Earth (2017)
- The Last Supper Before Ragnarok (2019)
- Food of the Gods (2017)

=== Novellas ===
- Nothing But Blackened Teeth (2021)
- The Salt Grows Heavy (2023)
- Find Me Where It Ends (2026)

=== Anthologies ===
- Southeast Asian Urban Anthologies
- Flesh: A Southeast Asian Urban Anthology (2016) with Angeline Woon
- A Darker Shade: New Stories of Body Horror from Women Writers (2023)
- The Big Book of Cyberpunk. Vintage Books. 2023.

=== Chapbooks ===
- Bearly a Lady (2017)

==== Born to the Blade ====
- Baby Shower (2018)
- Dreadnought (2018)

==== Persons Non Grata ====
- Hammers on Bone (2016)
- A Song for Quiet (2017)

=== Collections ===
- Breakable Things (2022)

=== Short fiction ===
- "Disconnect" (2014)
- "What the Highway Prefers" (2015)
- "Red String" (2015)
- "An Ocean of Eyes" (2015)
- "In the Rustle of Pages" (2015)
- "Her Pound of Flesh" (2015)
- "The Man Who Buys Giggles" (2015)
- "When We Die on Mars" (2015)
- "Clown Shoes" (2016)
- "Every Instance of You" (2016)
- "The Games We Play" (2016)
- "Breathe" (2016)
- "Some Breakable Things" (2016)
- "Speak" (2016)
- "The Price of Small Joys" (2016)
- "Degrees of Beauty" (2016)
- "And in Our Daughters, We Find a Voice" (2016)
- "For the Things We Never Said" (2016)
- "Hungry Ghosts" (2016)
- "What to Do When It's Nothing but Static" (2017)
- "Goddess, Worm" (2017)
- "The Ghost Stories We Tell Around Photon Fires" (2017)
- "Radio Werewolf" (2017)
- "The Day They Found the Train" (2017)
- "Saudade" (2017)
- "Bearly a Lady" (2017)
- "Custom-Made" (2017)
- "I Built This City for You" (2017)
- "Masterclass" (2017)
- "These Deathless Bones" (2017)
- "The Truth That Lies Under Skin and Meat" (2017)
- "Degrees of Ellision" (2017)
- "Don't Turn on the Lights" (2017)
- "Kiss, Don't Tell" (2017)
- "A Secret of Devils" (2017)
- "Landmark" (2017)
- "The Quiet Like a Homecoming" (2018)
- "A Priest of Vast and Distant Places" (2018)
- "You Do Nothing but Freefall" (2018) with A. Maus
- "She Who Hungers, She Who Waits" (2018)
- "How the Spider Got Her Legs" (2018)
- "Four Revelations from the Rusalka Ball" (2018)
- "Recite Her the Names of Pain" (2018)
- "And Was Jerusalem Builded Here?" (2018)
- "Shooting Iron" (2018) with Jonathan L. Howard
- "Bargains by the Slant-Light" (2018)
- "Monologue by an unnamed mage, recorded at the brink of the end" (2018)
- "Unbowed" (2018)
- "Nepenthe" (2019)
- "What We Have Chosen to Love" (2019)
- "Mighty Are the Meek and the Myriad" (2019)
- "Cinders" (2023)
- "Fortune Favors Grief" (2024)

=== Poems ===
- Protestations Against the Idea of Anglicization (2017)
- My Mama (2017)
- Apathetic Goblin Nightmare Woman (2017)
- Found Discarded: A Love Poem, Questionably Addressed. (2018)
- Octavia's Letter to Marcus Anthony on the Discovery of His Faithlessness (2018)
- A Letter from One Woman to Another (2019)
- Instructions for When You've Endured as Much as You Can (2019)
- Exorcism (2025)

=== Tabletop games ===
- Van Richten's Guide to Ravenloft (writer, Wizards of the Coast, 2021)
- Critical Role: Call of the Netherdeep (writer, Wizards of the Coast, 2022)

=== Video games ===
- She Remembered Caterpillars (2017)
- Where the Water Tastes Like Wine (2018)
- Sunless Skies (2019)
- Falcon Age (2019)
- Hyper Scape (2020)
- Wasteland 3 (2020)
- Gotham Knights (2022)
- World of Horror (co-writer, 2023)
