= The Library at Hellebore =

2025 horror novel by Cassandra Khaw

- Author: Cassandra Khaw
- Language: English
- Genre: Horror; dark academia
- Published: July 22, 2025
- Publisher: Tor Nightfire
- Pages: 288 (Hardcover)
- ISBN: 9781250877819

The Library at Hellebore is a 2025 horror novel by Cassandra Khaw. It has been described as dark academia. The novel tells the story of a group of students with dangerous powers who are sent to Hellebore Institute. The faculty attacks the students, who seek shelter in the school's library in a bid for survival.

== Plot ==
The story is presented non-chronologically; it is summarized here in chronological order for clarity.

In the modern era, magic has gradually returned to the world. Students who have dangerous magical abilities are sent to the Hellebore Institute, where their powers can be contained for society's safety.

Alessa Li wakes in an unfamiliar bedroom at Hellebore and realizes she has been enrolled against her will. She has the ability to eviscerate people with a touch; the men she has killed include her sexually abusive stepfather. During her time at Hellebore, Alessa has a contentious relationship with her roommate Johanna. She meets several other denizens of the school, including class clown Rowan and teaching assistant Portia.

During botany class, Rowan reveals that he is a deathworker when he kills plants with a touch. During the commotion, Alessa tries to escape. She is caught by the headmistress and returned to campus.

Alessa agrees to distract the Librarian while Rowan retrieves a book from the library. The Librarian, an immortal humanoid centipede, longs for death. It attempts to eat Rowan, hoping that his deathworker magic will kill it. Alessa and Rowan escape the library with the aid of other students.

On the night before graduation, Johanna tells Alessa that she is cursed. She is being hunted by a creature called the Skinless Wolf, which plans to feed on her and use her body to perpetuate its own power. Johanna asks Alessa to kill her instead. Alessa eviscerates Johanna, granting her a painless death. Rowan and Stefania arrive, accusing Alessa of murder. They are interrupted by the headmistress, who calls them to graduation.

At the graduation ceremony, the school's faculty combines into a gelatinous monstrosity and begins eating students. The survivors barricade themselves in the school library. Including Alessa, there are eight survivors. These include Portia, who can shift into a spider; Adam, a son of Satan; Rowan, the deathworker; Eoan, who has a portal inside him; Minji, a girl possessed by a hive mind; Ford, who can read his own entrails; and Gracelynn, whose voice can control others.

The headmistress slides a note under the library door. The note claims that the remaining students must fight to the death; the last surviving student will be allowed to leave Hellebore. Ford prophesies that “half live if Rowan dies”.

Portia transforms into a spider. Together, she and Adam kill Eoan. The Librarian begins to hunt the students. Gracelynn is taken by the Librarian, buying time for Alessa and Rowan to escape. Minji vivisects Ford before leaving to join the faculty.

Adam attacks Rowan and severely injures him. Alessa kisses Rowan, becoming infected by his death magic. The Librarian, longing for death, eats Rowan and then begins to die. Adam kills Gracelynn and Portia. Alessa kisses Adam, infecting him with the death curse as well.

As Adam and Alessa both begin dying, she opens the doors to the library and drags him to face the faculty. The faculty begins to eat Alessa, and also dies as a result of the death magic. A dying, dreaming Alessa contemplates revenge and the meaning of the lessons she learned at Hellebore.

== Style ==
Alessa Li narrates the novel in first person. The story alternates between two timelines. Some chapters are labeled "Before" and are set after Alessa first arrives at Hellebore. Others take place in the story's present, after the teachers have revealed themselves to be monsters.

== Reception and awards ==
Writing for the New York Times, author and critic Gabino Iglesias stated that "Khaw’s style is a peculiar mix of lyricism and brutality." Iglesias opined that "Khaw keeps readers hooked ... with the tension that at any moment, a student could be devoured. This is a story where there is never any solid ground, and that purposeful confusion deliciously intensifies the novel’s anxiety-inducing atmosphere." John Mauro of Grimdark Magazine wrote that the novel "packs a surprising amount of nuance for a body horror" and praised the use of unreliable narration. Mauro concluded that "Cassandra Khaw blurs the line between the monstrous and the humane, while delivering a gut punch of a story."

Matthew Jackson of Paste called Cassandra Khaw "one of the finest prose stylists the genre has to offer right now" and praised "their style of textured, dread-laced storytelling." The review praised the exploration of power dynamics in the novel, writing that the book "becomes a study of power and who gets to wield it. If you were told your entire life that you’re a monster, then you were pitted against something more monstrous that wants to eat you alive, what would you do?" Jackson concluded that The Library at Hellebore is possibly Khaw's best work to date, and "one of the 2025 horror novels you won’t want to miss."

Martin Cahill of Reactor praised the characters, stating that "Khaw has crafted an engaging, bittersweet collection of outsiders, whose otherness is literalized by their enrollment in Hellebore." Cahill particularly praised the protagonist Alessa, including her "sharp, incisive point of view ... her dry and wry observations, her tactical and dextrous perspective when her back is against the wall." The same review states that the character of Alessa shows the reader "that when you’ve been on the outside your whole life, when the world wants to eat you, it’s always worth standing up and trying to survive."

Avis Downs of the Yakima Herald-Republic wrote that "For all Harry Potter fans that grew up wanting to be whisked away to Hogwarts, Hellebore is your grown-up, visceral substitute." Downs felt positively about the book, stating that it is "a truly mind-crippling cocktail of body horror and ambrosial prose, this tale will pluck out your heart and hold it hostage until the last page." Kirkus Reviews made a similar comparison to the famous fictional school, wroting that "the Hellebore Technical Institute for the Ambitiously Gifted is less an homage to Hogwarts than a gory rebuttal dressed in wizard’s robes." The review was more mixed in its evaluation, stating that "Whether the deadpan violence and body horror is excessive is a matter of personal taste" and advised readers to proceed with caution.

Publishers Weekly gave the book a critical review, calling it "a shockingly gory and not entirely successful take on dark academia." The review wrote that the shifting timelines made the "stakes uncertain" and critiqued the relationship between Alessa and her classmates, concluding that "the result is messy, both literally and figuratively."

The novel was a finalist for the 2026 Locus Award for Best Horror Novel.
