= Tonya R. Moore =

Jamaican-born American speculative-fiction author, editor and poet

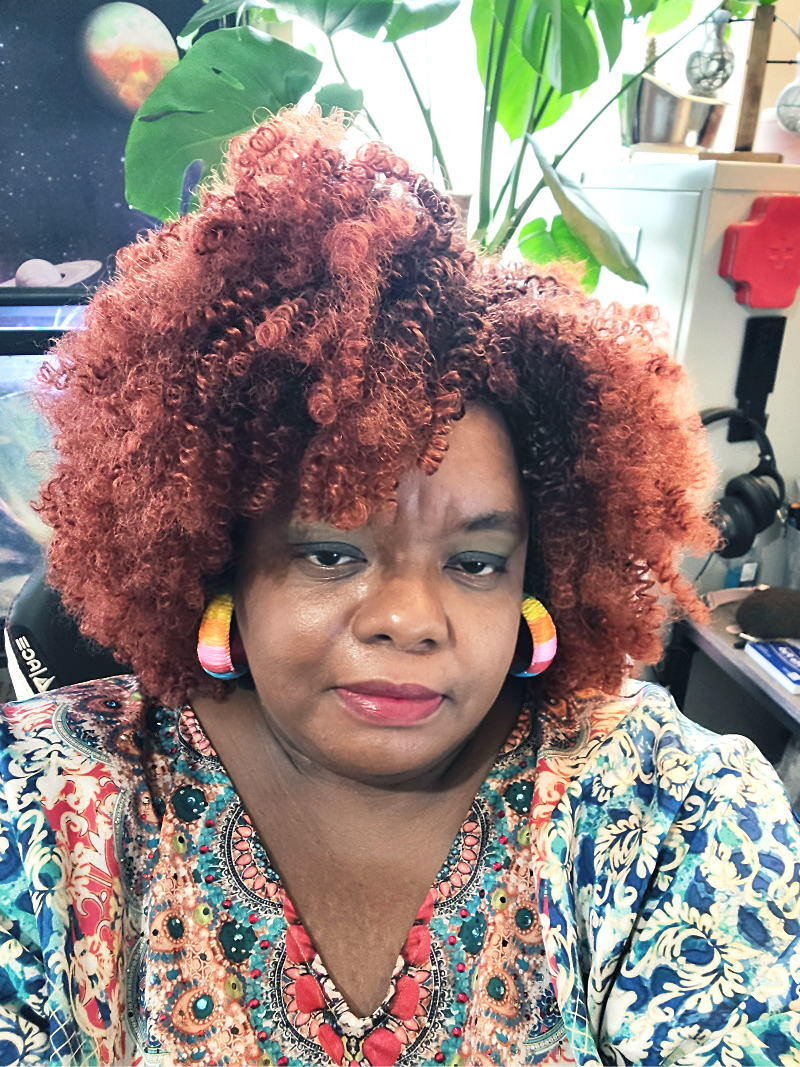
- Born: Jamaica
- Occupation: Writer, editor, poet
- Genre: science fiction

Website
- www.tonyamoore.com

Tonya R. Moore is an award-nominated speculative fiction author, editor, and poet. She was born in Jamaica and currently lives in Florida.

== Writing career ==
In 2020, Moore became Poetry Acquiring Editor at FIYAH Literary Magazine; she also published her omnibus of science fiction, fantasy, and horror stories: Odes to the Multiverse. In 2022, Moore was nominated for the Hugo Award in the Best Semi-Prozine category for her work with FIYAH. The same year, she was one of three finalists for the Analog Award for Emerging Black Voices and she was named a Voodoonauts Fellow.

Her latest project is Speculative Fiction Multiverse, "a quarterly Online Magazine and social network created for science fiction, fantasy, horror fans, creators, and industry professionals," for which she is Founder/Editor in Chief.

== Personal life ==
Moore was born in Jamaica, and she currently resides in Sebring, Florida.

== Awards ==
- Hugo Award Finalist, Semi-Prozine category, 2022
- Analog Award for Emerging Black Voices, 2022, Finalist
