= The Four Profound Weaves =

2020 fantasy novella by R. B. Lemberg

- Cover art for "The Four Profound Weaves"
- Author: R. B. Lemberg
- Language: English
- Series: Birdverse
- Publisher: Tachyon Publications
- Publication date: 1 Sep 2020
- Pages: 192 (Paperback)
- ISBN: 1616963344

The Four Profound Weaves is a 2020 LGBT+ fantasy novella by R. B. Lemberg. The novella received critical acclaim, including an honorable mention for the 2020 Otherwise Award, as well as being a finalist for the Nebula Award,, Ignyte Award,, Locus Award,, and World Fantasy Award.

== Plot ==
A nameless man returns to the desert settlement of his old friend Uiziya in the hopes that she can give him a name and identity. He has transitioned from female to male and is struggling with his place in his strictly gender-segregated tribe. Uiziya is a weaver awaiting the return of her aunt Benesret, who has promised to teach her the art of magical weaving and the Four Profound Weaves. The two journey into the desert to search for Benesret. Uiziya is injured by both an assassin and Benesret, and the nameless man takes her to his home city of Iyar. They attract the attention of The Collector, who kidnaps Uiziya so she can weave from Death for him. The two defeat The Collector. The nameless man claims a new name, Kaveh-nen-Kimri; he and Uiziya promise to explore the desert further together.

== Major themes ==
The novella discusses the relationship between transgender identity and death. Uiziya learns to weave cloth from Death itself, and the nameless man learns that he is "dead inside" throughout his journey. Some transgender people feel that their pre-transition lives are a type of "waking death", and transgender people are victims of murder at higher rates than cisgender people. The story also discusses the intersectionality between discrimination based on gender identity and age.

== Background ==
Lemberg has published short stories and poems in the Birdverse before, most frequently in the literary magazine Beneath Ceaseless Skies. The Four Profound Weaves is their first full-length work set in this shared universe.

== Reception ==
The novella has received widespread praise from many critics and readers.

Reviews have praised the novella for its lyrical writing, and inclusion of two elderly transgender narrators in an accurate discussion of aging. A review from Locus praised the succinct prose and worldbuilding, calling it "one of the most beautifully written fantasies of the year". In a starred review, Publishers Weekly called it an "outstanding debut novel" and praised its "deeply considered, evocative" characterization. New York Journal of Books called it "a beautifully articulated exploration of queer identity and transformation" and called Lemberg's prose "rhythmic and haunting". Ms. Magazine called it "a wonder of identity, evolution and bravery in a time when we need it most".

== Awards and nominations ==
Year	Award	Category	Result	Ref.
2020	Nebula Award	Novella	Nominated	
2020	Otherwise Award	—	Honor List	
2021	Ignyte Award	Novella	Finalist	
2021	Locus Award	Novella	Finalist	
2021	World Fantasy Award	Novella	Finalist	
