= The City in Glass =

2024 fantasy novel by Nghi Vo

- Author: Nghi Vo
- Language: English
- Genre: Fantasy
- Publisher: Tordotcom
- Publication date: October 2024
- Publication place: United States
- Pages: 213
- ISBN: 9781250348272

The City in Glass is a 2024 fantasy novel by Nghi Vo. The novel spans several centuries and tells the story of a demon, an angel, and their relationship with the fictional city of Azril. The novel received critical acclaim and was named one of the best speculative fiction novels of 2024 by Publishers Weekly.

== Plot ==
For hundreds of years, the demon Vitrine lives in the city of Azril, watching its people and guiding its development. In her heart, she keeps a book which contains memories of the city’s history and citizens. Throughout the story, Vitrine’s interactions with the people in her book are revealed through a series of flashbacks.

One night, a group of angels arrives to destroy the city. Every human in Azril is killed, and the city is burned. Vitrine curses the leader of the angels, and a piece of her becomes lodged within him. The angel is trapped in the ruins of the city with her; his fellow angels will not allow him to return while he is tainted with Vitrine’s essence.

Vitrine promises to rebuild her beloved city. During the first years, she and the angel have several confrontations. This culminates in a fight in which Vitrine asks the angel to leave for fifty years. Decades later, the angel returns, leading a group of refugees. He asks Vitrine to allow them to stay in Azril. She agrees, on the condition that the angel gives her his wings. She stores them inside her heart with her book. The first child of the refugees, a girl named Jinan, is born near the ruins of Azril. Vitrine eventually grows to accept the refugees as her new people. Vitrine follows the lives of Jinan, her son Alex, and several generations of their descendants. The city eventually exceeds its former glory, and Vitrine grows to love the new architecture, particularly the city’s world-renowned library.

Azril is besieged by an invading army. Vitrine is traumatized by war and unable to assist while her city suffers. In the fighting, much of the city is damaged. The angel saves the city by destroying many of the invaders. The angel and Vitrine realize that they love each other and the city. Vitrine transforms the angel into a new library and places her book on its shelf.

== Major themes ==
Jake Casella Brookins of Locus wrote that the novel explores the use of violence against innocents, comparing the destruction of Azril and its citizens to the use of atomic warfare. Casella Brookins writes that "[Vitrine] spends years clearing the city of human remains, remembering each by name. This atrocity sits, unforgiven, in Vitrine and in the novel." Casella Brookins praised the way in which the novel avoided becoming a "pat story of healing and moving on." Liz Bourke, also writing for Locus, felt that the novel could be read as "an argument about living with ... the inimical decisions of destructive powers: untouchable powers that are far away until suddenly, unexpectedly, they’re right up close and killing your neighbours." Bourke further stated the following:

Vitrine comes to Azril first as a refugee from the war that destroyed her previous home and all its inhabitants, save those who fled. The angels’ devastation of Azril strikes with the suddenness of a tidal wave or a nuclear blast, as fatally unreasonable to the inhabitants as a missile strike on a children’s hospital or a refugee encampment. The war that comes to a rebuilt Azril in The City in Glass’s closing pages comes with no more reason than war ever comes, and brings yet more pointless destruction in its wake: the wreckage of an observatory, the ruin of a library, the death of children. In as much as it is a love story, it’s a story about destruction and endurance, and it feels like a commentary on the nature of survival, resilience, grief and love.

== Reception ==
Publishers Weekly named The City in Glass as one of the best science fiction, fantasy, and horror books of 2024. In a starred review, Publishers Weekly called the book "an astonishing standalone novel of grief, retribution, and love that evokes the best of Italo Calvino and Ursula K. Le Guin." The review praised Vo's "beautiful and evocative" prose, writing that it may be her best novel to date.

Marlene Harris of Library Journal praised the relationship between Vitrine and the nameless angel, comparing it to the "push-pull duality" of the characters from This is How You Lose the Time War by Max Gladstone and Amal El-Mohtar. She also compared the angel and demon relationship to the characters from Good Omens by Neil Gaiman and Terry Pratchett, writing that the novel "[tells] a romantic story about two beings on opposite sides of an eternal conflict who find common ground but never peace." Alex Brown of Reactor praised Vo's beautiful and poetic prose, as well as the characterization of the inhabitants of Azril. Brown stated that "human characters come and go, sometimes making only brief appearances and sometimes living their whole lives in a few pages, but no matter what, they all feel fully realized and realistically complicated." Brown found the story to be "wholly itself," but also compared it positively to This is How You Lose the Time War, Tread of Angels, and The Dead Cat Tail Assassins. Nileena Sunil of Strange Horizons felt that the worldbuilding had a "dreamlike quality" punctuated by "strong, sharp imagery." Sunil found the book to have an unconventional romance, as Vitrine and the angel "are shown to be otherworldly beings and don’t need to love like humans do."

Writing for Locus, Gary K. Wolfe praised Vo's "restrained mastery of the novella form." Wolfe wrote that "The City in Glass features some of Vo's most elegant and haunting prose" and praised the "complex and fascinating" character of Vitrine. Jake Casella Brookins, also writing for Locus, praised the way in which the story handles time, with chapters that "move organically back and forth between Azril-before, its long centuries of development and intrigue, and Azril-after, the new thing that grows after the apocalypse." In a third review for Locus, Liz Bourke called the novel "less a story in the classic mode than an emotional journey told in crisply beautiful prose."

Awards
Year	Award	Category	Result	Ref.
2024	Los Angeles Times Book Prize	Science Fiction, Fantasy, and Speculative Fiction	Finalist	
2025	Locus Award	Best Fantasy Novel	Finalist	
2025	Mythopoeic Award	Adult Literature	Finalist	
2025	Ursula K. Le Guin Prize	—	Shortlisted	
