= The Lies of the Ajungo =

2023 novella by Moses Ose Utomi

- Author: Moses Ose Utomi
- Language: English
- Series: The Forever Desert
- Release number: 1
- Genre: Fantasy
- Publisher: Tordotcom
- Publication date: 21 Mar 2023
- Publication place: United States
- Pages: 87 (hardcover)
- Awards: 2024 Ignyte Award for Outstanding Novella
- ISBN: 9781250849069
- Followed by: The Truth of the Aleke

The Lies of the Ajungo is a 2023 novella by Moses Ose Utomi. It is the first entry in the Forever Desert series and is the author's debut novella. It won the 2024 Ignyte Award for Outstanding Novella.

== Plot ==
In the City of Lies, citizens have their tongues cut out on their thirteenth birthday. In exchange, the Ajungo Empire sends them water. Despite this, citizens live in a constant state of drought, and many die of thirst.

Shortly before his thirteenth birthday, Tutu sees that his mother is dying of dehydration. He visits Oba Ijefi, the city's ruler. Tutu promises to leave the city and find water in the Forever Desert. Many have attempted this quest before, and none have returned. Despite this, the Oba gives her blessing to Tutu. Tutu promises to return to his mother after finding water; he journeys into the desert.

In the desert, he finds the desiccated corpses of many children. He encounters a party of three camel riders: Asilah, Funme, and Lami. Lami is a Seer, who uses a bracelet of God’s Eye stones to wield magical powers. The women are also from a city subjugated by the Ajungo. Their city, also called the City of Lies, needs iron. In exchange, the Ajungo Empire takes the citizens' ears.

Tutu and his new companions travel together for six months, failing to find a water supply large enough for his city. Envoys from Tutu's city reach him, claiming that water has been found. They ask Tutu to return home with them. Tutu wants to join them, but the women warn him that something is amiss. The soldiers attack Tutu and his companions. Lami is killed. Tutu takes her bracelet, gaining her powers as a Seer. Tutu kills the enemy commander.

Tutu, Asilah, and Funme meet a blind man, Ogoro. Ogoro tells them that he lives in a city that sits near three rivers; his city is once again known as the City of Lies. In exchange for God's Eyes to prevent flooding, the Ajungo take the eyes from citizens in Ogoro's city. Their group decides to confront the Ajungo directly.

Tutu’s group attacks an Ajungo wagon train, killing the driver and guards. Asilah dies from injuries suffered during the fight. In the back of the wagon, they find a container of severed tongues, ears, and eyeballs. Tutu uses water, iron, and a God's Eye to open a box which contains a sealed letter. He learns that the Obas of each city have been working together to oppress their people; in truth, the Ajungo do not exist.

Tutu returns to his City of Lies, finding that his mother has been killed. He confronts Oba Ijefe. He uses his new powers to show that the city sits atop a reservoir of fresh water; the drought has been manufactured in order for Ijefe to consolidate her own power. Tutu kills Ijefe and releases the water, beginning a process that will heal the city. Tutu is stabbed in the back by one of Ijefe's guards. As he dies, he thinks that he has fulfilled his promises to his mother: he has brought water to the city, and he will see her soon.

== Major themes ==
Arley Sorg noted that relationships are a central theme of the novella. The story explores Tutu's relationships with his mother, fellow travelers in the desert, and political institutions. The novella also portrays the way in which citizens of several cities relate with each other. Sorg comments on the theme of power, stating that the book explores "the ways in which we define ourselves according to the dictates of the powerful—often without reflection or even realizing it."

== Reception and awards ==
Marlene Harris of Library Journal gave the novella a starred review, writing that the story combines elements of fable and fantasy. Harris concluded that the book is a "short but deeply affecting parable." Bill Capossere of fantasyliterature.com gave the book five stars out of a possible five. Capossere stated that the tale is "as close to perfect a modern parable as I've read in some time, with prose as sparse as its desert setting and lessons just as unforgiving." The review praised the spare prose, noting that it fits well with the desert setting and the fable-like tone of the novella.

Michael Dodd of Grimdark Magazine praised the contrast between the novella's heartwarming coming-of-age narrative and the heartbreaking nature of the lies revealed by the narrative. Dodd praised the "character-first approach" to the storytelling, which allows the novella to deliver emotional resonance despite its short length.

Writing for The Escapist, Damien Lawardon called the book "a sharp, striking work of Afrofantasy" and praised the sparse style. Lawardon commented on the nature of the knowledge that Tutu discovers throughout his journey, stating that the book "speaks to issues of fake news and post-truth realities in the real world."

Arley Sorg of Lightspeed praised the novella's worldbuilding. Sorg noted that some readers might find it to be underdeveloped, but the reviewer felt that it was "controlled and focused," lending a fairy tale sensibility to the book. Sorg praised the climax as brilliant, concluding that "Utomi has a knack for storytelling."

Alex Brown of Reactor wrote that the novella format balanced "brevity with lushness," calling the book "an epic fantasy in novella format." Brown praised Utomi's prose, as well as the worldbuilding of the desert setting.

The book won the 2024 Ignyte Award for Outstanding Novella. It was shortlisted for the 2024 Nommo Award for Best Novella.
