= The All-Consuming World =

Book by Cassandra Khaw

The All-Consuming World is a book by Cassandra Khaw. Jessica P. Wick of NPR described it as a unique take on a common genre of story. The Washington Post listed it among the best science fiction, fantasy and horror of 2021.

The book is a science fiction crime fiction, which follows a group of cyborg clone criminals opposing the Minds, powerful AI intelligences.
