= Nothing but Blackened Teeth =

2021 horror novella by Cassandra Khaw

- Author: Cassandra Khaw
- Language: English
- Genre: Horror; Japanese horror
- Set in: Japan
- Publisher: Tor Nightfire
- Publication date: 19 Oct 2021
- Pages: 128 (Hardcover)
- ISBN: 9781250759412

Nothing but Blackened Teeth is a 2021 horror novella by Cassandra Khaw. The book tells the story of a group of five friends who encounter supernatural beings at a haunted mansion in Japan. The novella received praise for the complex relationships between its central characters.

== Plot ==
A group of five friends goes on a trip to Japan for a destination wedding. Cat, the narrator, is the best friend of Faiz. Faiz and Talia (Note: In some versions of the book, this character is called Nadia. The article will use Talia for consistency.) plan to get married in a haunted house. Phillip, the only son of a wealthy family, rents a Heian-era mansion as the venue. Lin, the fifth member of the group, is closer to Cat than with the others. The group has dealt with several complicated relationships in the past. Cat has recently spent time in an inpatient facility due to suicidal ideation. Several members have dated each other and broken up. Talia and Faiz previously had relationship problems. Cat had suggested that they break up, leading Talia to dislike her.

The Heian mansion was once the site of a wedding. However, the groom died and the wedding never took place. The bride, assuming that she was jilted, asked the wedding guests to bury her alive in the foundation of the house. Each year after that, a new girl was buried in the mansion's walls.

Old conflicts immediately come to the surface. Lin instigates a fight with Phillip over the latter's infatuation with Talia. Cat begins hearing voices. She sees the ghost of the dead bride in a mirror. The bride appears to have no face, with a red mouth full of black teeth. Talia interrupts the vision to ask if Cat is ok. The two immediate begin fighting, each wishing that the other were not present.

Talia invites everyone to play Hyakumonogatari Kaidankai. Cat drunkenly tells a metafictional story about a group of friends who visit a haunted house and encounter a spirit. The lights go out. Talia runs to explore the mansion. She returns to ask the others to follow her, claiming to have found something amazing. She enters through a fusuma. Cat claims that the screen was previously a solid wall and begs the others not to follow Talia. Faiz and Phillip go with Talia anyway. Lin and Cat hesitate but eventually follow.

Despite starting on the second floor, they pass through the doorway into a ground-floor area. They find Talia and Faiz dressed in wedding clothes, with Phillip serving as their officiant. Cat and Lin try to convince the others that something is wrong. Talia tells them both to leave. Lin rips off Talia's wedding veil, showing that she has no face. The creature, called an ohaguro-bettari, begins to laugh and vanishes. The yōkai on the shoji screens come to life and begin following the remaining group members.

Faiz claims that they can save Talia by finding information in the library. Lin wants to leave, but Cat states that they will die if the group splits up. In the library, Faiz claims that an occult ritual will save Talia; however, Phillip states that the book's pages are blank. The ohaguro-bettari reappears to watch the group. Faiz promises to kill himself to complete the ritual, which requires a human sacrifice. Phillip punches him; Faiz pulls a knife and disembowels Phillip. As Phillip lies dying, Cat suggests using him as the sacrifice. They complete the ritual, and the manor returns Talia unharmed.

The survivors flee, burning down the manor and claiming the Phillip died in the fire. After Phillip's memorial, the survivors drift apart. Cat returns to college. She wonders if the ohaguro-bettari followed them from the manor. Whenever she sees her own reflection in the mirror, the features appear smudged, and her mouth seems to be full of blackened teeth.

== Style ==
A review for The Nerd Daily called the book "a fascinatingly illustrative dive into the Japanese literary tradition of the kaidan." Various elements of Japanese culture and mythology are presented with minimal exposition for a Western audience. The review notes that this creates an "oppressing, sinister atmosphere."

The same review notes that characters make meta references to various tropes of the horror genre. These often serve as red herrings for the reader. The climax of the story allows Khaw to subvert one of the most common tropes of the genre, denouncing "the mistreatment of non-white characters in horror."

== Reception and awards ==
Becky Stratford of Library Journal called the book "engrossing and methodically paced." Spratford praised the complicated relationships between the characters, concluding that the book would be enjoyable to fans of Mexican Gothic by Silvia Moreno-Garcia and Slade House by David Mitchell. Jessica P. Wick of NPR wrote that the characters are bound together more by shared history than because they would be friends in the present, which works well for the narrative. Wick concluded that the novella is "one of the most beautifully written haunted stories I've ever read." Ankara C of The Nerd Daily wrote that the book is a "feast for the senses" and a "definite must-read."

Writing for Reactor, Lee Mandelo praised the way in which the humans characters provided the impetus for the conflict. Despite Talia's disappearance, none of the supernatural creatures in the tale physically harm the characters. Instead, they "provide them an impetus to act on their bubbling years-long conflicts with one another." Mandelo concluded that there is "intense emotional realism underlying the blood-soaked, claustrophobic horror" and highly recommended the book.

Jodie Crump of Grimdark Magazine found the story of the buried-alive bride to be the weakest part of the narrative. Crump praised the group dynamics, writing that initially they appeared to be slasher film tropes. However, Khaw developed the characters well, using the tropes as "jumping-off points for complex, multi-faceted characters, each with their own flaws and fears." Crump compared the book to a gorier version of a Shirley Jackson story, concluding that it is "a riveting book, perfect for fans of creepy tales with a little extra bite."

Year	Award	Category	Result	Ref.
2021	Bram Stoker Award	Long Fiction	Nominated	
2021	Shirley Jackson Award	Novel	Nominated	
2022	British Fantasy Award	Horror Novel (August Derleth Award)	Shortlisted	
2022	Ignyte Award	Novella	Finalist	
2022	RUSA CODES Reading List	Horror	Won	
2022	World Fantasy Award	Novella	Nominated	
