= A Long and Speaking Silence =

2026 fantasy novella by Nghi Vo

- Author: Nghi Vo
- Illustrator: Alyssa Winans
- Language: English
- Series: Singing Hills Cycle
- Release number: 7
- Genre: Fantasy
- Publisher: Tordotcom
- Publication date: May 5, 2026
- Publication place: United States
- Pages: 144 (Hardcover)
- ISBN: 9781250386427
- Preceded by: A Mouthful of Dust
- Followed by: The Judgment of Needles

A Long and Speaking Silence is a 2026 fantasy novella by Nghi Vo. The seventh book in her Singing Hills Cycle, it tells the story of Chih, who has recently become a cleric of the Singing Hills Abbey. Along with their talking hoopoe Almost Brilliant, Chih visits a town experiencing an influx of refugees and collects stories there.

== Plot ==
Cleric Chih, a new initiate of the Singing Hills Monastery, visits the city of Luntien. Chih travels with their talking hoopoe, Almost Brilliant. Chih's purse is stolen, so they find themself serving as waitstaff at a local restaurant, Certain Compassion. Chih records stories from proprietress Savonn, her husband Phiran, and their relatives.

Refugees from Muyi (Note: Citizens of Luntien refer to the refugees as Verdant Islanders, but the refugees call themselves Muyese.) arrive, leading to conflict with the townspeople. At the same time, crowds in Luntien prepare for a local festival. Chih witnesses a scuffle between refugees and locals. Their fellow server, Bich, gives them leftovers to take to the refugees. Bich's family immigrated to Luntien many years ago, but she has conflicted feelings about the Muyese.

Chih visits the Temple of the Lady of the Thousand Hands, which is serving as a shelter for refugees. Vang Kao, a Muyese man, asks Chih to bring news of this group of survivors to Muyese refugees in other cities.

A teenage refugee named Ha Beili uses a bucket without permission, almost sparking a fight. Chih diffuses the situation. Ha Beili tells Chih about Muyi and its eponymous goddess. The lonely goddess swam into the ocean, watched by the moon. When the new moon turned away from Muyi, she crushed a ship in her despair. Muyi turned herself into an island, and the survivors of the shipwreck became Ha Beili's ancestors. They lived on the island, promising that Muyi would never again be lonely. Ha Beili wonders what will happen to the lonely goddess now that all of her people have fled. Later, Chih accidentally offends a Muyese elder; the elder's refusal to speak with Chih leaves gaps in the historical record which the cleric is recording.

The next night, Chih witnesses Ha Beili's father striking her. The girl flees. During the festival, Chih encounters Ha Beili. Local men chase the girl, accusing her of theft. A sudden hailstorm allows Chih and Ha Beili to escape. They flee to the safety of Bich's house, where Chih hears more stories. They witness a Muyese dance and record the celebration.

Meanwhile, Chih searches for records of Mo, the precious owner of the Certain Compassion restaurant. Based on stories that Chih has heard, they suspect that Mo was tied to Singing Hills. They learn that Mo was once cleric Lunmo, who had fled the Anh Empire during a time of political instability. Chih discovers the body of Lunmo's hoopoe companion, likely named Certain Compassion. Chih and Almost Brilliant promise to return the body to Singing Hills.

== Reception and awards ==
Publishers Weekly gave the novella a starred review. The review praised the book's "passion and grace", while also noting the depth of the characterization. The review praised the "moving, nuanced" portrayal of a refugee crisis. The thematic content explores "which stories are committed to history and which are lost", which makes this novella a high point in the series.

Kristi Chadwick of Library Journal commented on the way that the citizens of Luntien perceive refugees, stating that "many assume they are lazy, ignorant, or violent..." Chadwick also commented on the "anger and distrust" that fills the stories collected by Chih. The reviewer concluded that the book is an "enchanting" entry into the story of Chih and Almost Brilliant.

Writing for Locus, Gary K. Wolfe praised the variety of stories collected by Chih; these range from creation myths to family legends. These stories serve as a microcosm of the Singing Hills novellas, which focus on "the nature of stories and storytelling." As Vo has written more entries in the series, they have become increasingly focused on social issues; this novella focuses on refugees. Wolfe praised the depth of the characterization for both Chih and the side characters, finding that the novella format does not shortchange the minor characters. Wolfe concluded that the series "continues to be the most rewarding cycle of novellas I’ve seen in recent years."
