= List of science fiction magazines =

This is a list of science fiction and science fiction-related magazines. The primary focus of the magazines in this list is or was writing about science fiction and/or contained science fiction for at least part of their run.

Name	Founded	Defunct	Country	Publisher	Topics	Format	Citations
Amazing Stories	1926		United States	Experimenter Publishing Company	American science fiction magazine	Printed	
Analog Science Fiction and Fact	1930		United States	Crosstown Publications	American science fiction and popular science magazine	Printed	
Apex Magazine	2005		United States	Apex Book Company	American horror and science fiction magazine.	Online	
Asimov's Science Fiction	1977		United States	Penny Publications, LLC	American magazine which publishes science fiction and fantasy and perpetuates the name of Isaac Asimov.	Printed	
Clarkesworld Magazine	2006		United States	Wyrm Publishing	American magazine which publishes science fiction.	Online	
FIYAH Literary Magazine	2017		United States		Quarterly magazine of Black science fiction and fantasy.	Online	
Galaktika	1972	1995–2004	Hungary	Metropolis Media	Printed sci-fi and fantasy magazine with mainstream influence in Hungarian literature; despite the relatively small language market, at its peak was one of the top-selling SF magazines worldwide.	Printed	
Galaxy Science Fiction	1951	1980–1995	United States	H.P. Gold and World Editions	Printed sci-fi and fantasy magazine, available on PDF in Internet Archive	Printed (online when available on PDF)	
Interzone	1982		United Kingdom	TTA Press	Britain's longest running science fiction and fantasy magazine.	Online (printed until September 2023)	
Kalpabiswa	2016		India	Kalpabiswa Collective	Online magazine covering science fiction, fantasy, horror related subjects.	Online	
Lightspeed	2010		United States	John Joseph Adams	Online fantasy and science fiction magazine.	Online	
Locus	1968		United States	Locus	A news and review magazine of the science fiction, fantasy and horror publishing fields.	Printed	
The Magazine of Fantasy & Science Fiction	1949		United States	Fantasy & Science Fiction	The original publisher of various science fiction and fantasy classics like Stephen King's Dark Tower and many others.	Printed	
Mithila Review	2015		India	Salik Shah	Online magazine of science fiction, fantasy, art, poetry, reviews and interviews.	Online	
Nowa Fantastyka	1982		Poland		Polish science fiction and fantasy	Printed	
Permanent Flux	2026		United States	Permanent Flux	Magazine featuring contemporary works and public domain stories	Printed	
Reactor (formerly Tor.com)	2008		United States	Tor Books	Online magazine covering science fiction, fantasy, the universe and related subjects. Also publishes original short science fiction.	Online	
Science Fantasy	1950	1967	United Kingdom	Science Fantasy		Printed	
SciFi.bg	2010		Bulgaria	The Bulgarian SciFi Magazine	Online magazine about science fiction, fantasy and paranormal. Reviews about Books, TV-Shows, Games and everything else about the subject.	Online	
SciFiNow	2007		United Kingdom	Imagine Publishing	Magazine about all areas of sci-fi (film, TV, literature) also writing about fantasy and horror.	Printed through 2020, then online-only	
Sci Phi Journal	2014		Belgium	Sci Phi Journal	Quarterly journal dedicated to speculative fiction addressing philosophy, theology and related fields, with a particular focus on fictional non-fiction.	Online	
SFX	1995		United Kingdom	Future plc	Magazine covering topics in the genres of popular science fiction, fantasy and horror.	Printed	
Space and Time Magazine	1966		United States	Yuriko Publishing	American science fiction, fantasy and horror magazine.	Printed	
Strange Horizons	2000		United States	Strange Horizons	Online magazine of science fiction, science fact, fantasy, opinion, art and reviews.	Online	
