= The Empress of Salt and Fortune =

2020 fantasy novella by Nghi Vo

- Author: Nghi Vo
- Language: English
- Series: Singing Hills Cycle #1
- Published: March 24, 2020
- Publisher: Tordotcom
- Pages: 121 pp (paperback)
- ISBN: 9781250750303
- Followed by: When the Tiger Came Down the Mountain

The Empress of Salt and Fortune is a 2020 fantasy novella by American writer Nghi Vo. The plot focuses on a cleric who listens to stories about the recently deceased empress. It was well-received by literary magazines and critics and won the 2021 Hugo Award for Best Novella and the Crawford Award. It was also a finalist for the 2021 Locus Award for Best Novella and a Goodreads Choice Award.

It is the first book of the Singing Hills Cycle and was followed by a sequel, When the Tiger Came Down the Mountain, later that same year.

== Plot ==
Cleric Chih of the Singing Hills Monastery visits an abandoned palace, Thriving Fortune, after the death of In-yo, the Empress of Salt and Fortune. They are accompanied by a talking hoopoe named Almost Brilliant. On arrival they meet Rabbit, an elderly woman who was once the Empress’s servant. She tells Chih about Empress In-yo’s life as they catalogue the contents of the palace.

In-yo was a northern princess married to the Emperor of Pine and Steel as the empire solidified its control of the north. After she gives birth to his heir, the emperor has her sterilized and exiled to Thriving Fortune, a remote country palace. At Thriving Fortune, Empress In-yo is isolated and under observation by her attendants, but she is eventually able to build a small communication network. In-yo secretly corresponds with her kin and allies in the north, hoping to overthrow the Emperor. Rabbit becomes lovers with Sukai, one of In-yo's fortune teller spies. In-yo stages a pilgrimage, an excuse for leaving her exile in Thriving Fortune. She effects the replacement of her original caravan of servants and staff with northern warriors, allowing her to throw off Empire custody. A palace official executes Sukai, and his head is delivered to In-yo while on the pilgrimage. After their return to Thriving Fortune, Rabbit gives birth to Sukai’s daughter; In-yo presents the child as her own miraculous birth. She leads an army to the capital, the Emperor is killed, and In-yo takes the throne. She has recently died and has been succeeded by her heir, secretly Rabbit's daughter. Chih honors Rabbit as the mother of the new Empress. Rabbit disappears in the night, and Chih leaves Thriving Fortune for the capital and the Empress's coronation.

== Major themes ==
Strange Horizons noted that the novel subverts the reader's expectations regarding the importance of "side characters" and the "protagonist". Although In-yo might be considered the protagonist because her actions move the plot forward, Rabbit's life story is given equal prominence. Though she is a peasant girl, her relationship with the empress provides an emotional core to the novella. The novella also explores disenfranchisement, oppression, and classism. Rabbit never shares her given name, and much of her background remains a mystery. Additionally, her relationship with In-yo is complicated by their disparate wealth and social status. Chih records others' stories but not their own.

== Style ==
The story of In-yo is relayed to Chih by Rabbit, an unreliable narrator. Because Rabbit has her own motivations which are revealed through the story, the reader must determine if she is leaving anything out.

The worldbuilding of the story meshes elements from various real-life Asian cultures and languages, including China and Vietnam.

== Reception ==
Publishers Weekly gave the novella a starred review, calling it a "masterfully told story... sure to impress". An NPR review called it "a remarkable accomplishment of storytelling", praising the way in which it amplifies the voices of women as well as queer characters, including the non-binary cleric Chih. The novella also received praise for its layered narrative structure, in which Chih, Rabbit, and In-yo all dole out different pieces of the story. Reviewers have lauded the novel's female characters, the way in which women fight against their patriarchal society, and the "lyrical" and "haunting" prose.

A reviewer from DVAN praised Vo for her evocative writing style and strong characterization, but felt that the worldbuilding and magic system were weak.

== Awards ==
Year	Award	Category	Result	Ref.
2020	Goodreads Choice Awards	Fantasy	Nominated–15th	
2021	Crawford Award	—	Won	
2021	Hugo Award	Novella	Won	
2021	Ignyte Award	Novella	Finalist	
2021	Locus Award	Novella	Finalist	
