= Mammoths at the Gates =

2023 fantasy novella by Nghi Vo

- Author: Nghi Vo
- Language: English
- Series: Singing Hills Cycle #4
- Genre: Fantasy
- Publisher: Tordotcom
- Publication date: September 12, 2023
- Publication place: United States
- Media type: Print
- Pages: 128 pp
- ISBN: 9781250851437 (hardcover 1st ed.)
- OCLC: 1392290840
- Dewey Decimal: 813/.6
- Preceded by: Into the Riverlands
- Followed by: The Brides of High Hill

Mammoths at the Gates is a 2023 fantasy novella by Nghi Vo. It is the fourth novella in the Singing Hills Cycle, serving as a standalone sequel to the others.

== Plot ==
Cleric Chih returns to the Singing Hills Abbey for the first time in years. Chih learns that their mentor, Cleric Thien, has died in their absence. Thien’s granddaughters, Corporal Vi In Yee and Tui In Hao, have arrived at the abbey on the backs of mammoths. They have laid siege to the abbey's gates, demanding the body of their grandfather.

Chih reunites with their old friend Ru, who serves as the acting divine since Thien's death. Chih and Ru visit the aviary, where the abbey hosts a colony of neixin. Myriad Virtues, the companion to Thien, has clipped her own flight feathers as a grieving ritual. Chih reunites with their own neixin, Almost Brilliant. They also meet Almost Brilliant's newly-hatched daughter, Chiep.

In order to calm the angry granddaughters, Chih invites them inside to learn about Thien's work with the abbey. This angers Ru. After the dinner, Ru and Chih discuss their friendship and beliefs about the abbey. The abbey hosts a talking ceremony for Cleric Thien; Vi In Yee and Tui In Hao are both invited to attend. Myriad Virtues requests a speaking role, which is unusual for a neixin. Chih offers her their own seat, giving up a chance to speak for Thien.

Ru tells a story about their childhood as an orphan at the monastery. They ran away, not realizing that their previous home was gone. Thien and Myriad Virtues walked with Ru for three days. They returned to Ru's empty village, which had been decimated by a plague. Thien gave Ru a figurine of a stone pig which was found in the empty village, comforting them and educating them about the power of memory.

Tui In Hao tells a story about Thien's career as a judge, prior to their joining Singing Hills. Thien defended a young man accused of poaching, angering a powerful family in the pursuit of justice. Vi In Yee tells a story from her deceased grandmother, once the wife of Thien. Thien once pushed her down the stairs in a fight over money, breaking her leg and leading to a lifelong disability. Tui In Hao asks for the story to be struck from the record. Since neixin have perfect memories, this is impossible. Tui In Hao storms out, dragging her sister behind her. The clerics rush out to bar the doors, fearing an imminent attack.

Chih, Almost Brilliant, and Myriad Virtues are left alone. Myriad Virtues begins to recount her story of Thien's life. During their travels, Myriad Virtues once saw a caged bird. Even though it was not a neixin, this distressed her. Thien bought the bird and released it. They asked Myriad Virtues about the origin of the neixin, and she told them several creation myths.

The mammoths attack, breaking down the gates of the abbey. They are interrupted by a figure who appears to be Thien. In her grief, Myriad Virtues has taken on a human form in order to preserve the memory of her human companion. Myriad Virtues agrees to return home with Thien's family.

Chih reflects on the reality of change, homecoming, and their life at Singing Hills.

== Reception ==
Writing for the Ancillary Review of Books, Bronte Crawford praised the inclusion of Singing Hills Abbey as a setting for the novella. It does not appear physically in the first three novellas. Its inclusion in Mammoths at the Gates shows that the institution is "an embodiment of the ethos driving the Cycle itself." Crawford praised Vo's worldbuilding, writing that the author uses small objects and food to evoke the sense of a larger world beyond the abbey's borders. The review concludes by commenting on the themes of storytelling, including whose stories get to be heard and which versions of them are remembered. Because the Singing Hills books can be read in any order, the reader can participate in this thematic content: "in allowing us to enter the series at any point she allows us to shape her story as our own, allowing the reader’s experience as much agency as her authorship."

Maya Gittelman of Reactor praised the novella, calling it her favorite of the series so far. Gittelman commented on the cycle's themes of storytelling and preservation, noting that "Chih has been protagonist and archivist at once: our entrypoint into their world, and intentionally as much of a blank slate as possible. They are the story, but they are also the frame and the narrator." In Mammoths at the Gates, Chih becomes an integral part of the story. The review stated that the book is "clever and tender, textured with warm humor and quiet queer joy." Nonetheless, it is a thoughtful exploration of grief, "more personal and uncomfortable than before", which marks a tonal shift from previous entries in the series.

Writing for Locus, Gary K. Wolfe contrasted the novella with Into the Riverlands. While the former is fast-paced and action-packed, Mammoths at the Gates is "more quiet and ruminative." Wolfe wrote that the novella explored themes of change and succession, and Ru took over leadership from Thien and as Almost Brilliant hatches Chiep. Wolfe praised the character development for both Chih and Almost Brilliant, as well as Vo's worldbuilding in revealing more details about the empire in which the stories take place.

== Awards ==
Year	Award	Category	Result	Ref.
2023	Nebula Award	Novella	Shortlisted	
2024	Hugo Award	Novella	Finalist	
2024	Locus Award	Novella	Finalist	
2024	Ursula K. Le Guin Prize	—	Shortlisted	
2024	World Fantasy Award	Novella	Shortlisted	
