= The Trans Space Octopus Congregation =

2019 book by Bogi Takács

- Author: Bogi Takács
- Language: English
- Genre: Science fiction, fantasy, and LGBTQ+ fiction
- Publisher: Lethe Press
- Publication date: October 5, 2019
- Publication place: United States
- Pages: 315
- ISBN: 9781590216934

The Trans Space Octopus Congregation: Stories, more commonly known as The Trans Space Octopus Congregation, is a 2019 science fiction and fantasy work, composed of 23 short stories written by Bogi Takács.

== Content ==
The work contains a total of 23 different science fiction stories, most of them including fantasy elements. Many of these stories are also led by non-binary or gender-neutral characters. The stories show more submissive or accommodating characters in leadership positions, while receiving respect from those closest to them, while the characters who try to take advantage of submission to exert oppression are shown as antagonistic. Takács was originally going to include research papers which were references for The Trans Space Octopus Congregation, but was talked out of it.

The Trans Space Octopus Congregation takes advantage of the fictional contexts of fantasy and science fiction to explore BDSM relationships or power hierarchies, showing in many cases the submissive characters as those capable of accessing magic, which plays an important role in the stories.

=== Stories ===
It is composed of the following short stories:

- “This Shall Serve as a Demarcation”
- “Some Remarks on the Reproductive Strategy of the Common Octopus”
- “A Superordinate Set of Principles”
- “Forestspirit, Forestspirit”
- “Given Sufficient Desperation”
- “Changing Body Templates”
- “For Your Optimal Hookboarding Experience”
- “Increasing Police Visibility”
- “Good People in a Small Space”
- “Recordings of a More Personal Nature”
- “This Secular Technology”
- “Three Partitions”
- “Unifications”
- “The Size of a Barleycorn, Encased in Lead”
- “To Rebalance the Body”
- “Shovelware”
- “The Oracle of DARPA”
- “Toward the Luminous Towers”
- “Wind-Lashed Vehicles of Bone”
- “The Need for Overwhelming Sensation”
- “Spirit Forms of the Sea”
- “All Talk of Common Sense”
- “Standing on the Floodbanks”

== Reception and awards ==
In 2021, Alyssa Shotwell, writing for The Mary Sue, included The Trans Space Octopus Congregation on her list of the best trans fantasy and sci-fi works to read, also including works such as Cemetery Boys by Aiden Thomas.

In 2022, The Trans Space Octopus Congregation was a finalist for the Lambda Literary Award in the trans fiction category.
