= World of Horror =

2023 video game

- Developer: Paweł Koźmiński
- Publishers: WW: Ysbryd Games; JP: Playism
- Composers: Sebastian Zybowski; Joseph Bailey
- Engine: GameMaker Studio 2
- Platforms: macOS; Windows; Nintendo Switch; PlayStation 4; PlayStation 5
- Release: macOS, Windows; 19 October 2023; Nintendo Switch, PlayStation 4, PlayStation 5; 26 October 2023
- Genres: Role-playing, horror
- Mode: Single-player

World of Horror (Note: Also known by its Japanese title Kyōfu no Sekai (Japanese: 恐怖の世界)) is a 2023 role-playing video game developed by Paweł Koźmiński and published by Ysbryd Games. It takes place in the year "198X" in the fictional town of Shiokawa, Japan. The player explores various locations and fights otherworldly creatures in order to halt a looming apocalypse.

Initially conceived as a card board game, Koźmiński later reimagined the project as a video game, inspired by the works of H. P. Lovecraft and Junji Ito, among others. The game's art design has a 1-bit pixel art, created by Koźmiński in Microsoft Paint. Cassandra Khaw provided additional writing, while Sebastian Zybowski and Joseph Bailey composed the soundtrack. Koźmiński released several World of Horror demos on itch.io before launching the game in early access in February 2020. After several delays, the full game was released on 19 October 2023 for macOS and Windows. Versions for Nintendo Switch, PlayStation 4, and PlayStation 5 were released on 26 October. It received generally favorable reviews, with praise for its narrative and visuals, though some criticism was directed at its gameplay, particularly the combat.

== Gameplay ==
Screenshot of enemy encounter

World of Horror is a roguelite role-playing game, built around individual self-contained playthroughs consisting of five different "mysteries" that must be solved, each corresponding to one of five keys that are used at the end of the playthrough to enter a locked lighthouse, in order to defeat one of several possible Old Gods that is threatening the town. The player must do this before the game's "DOOM" meter reaches 100%, which marks the point at which the entity is summoned. DOOM increases each time the player takes an action, and can increase further as a result of certain events. Each of the various Old Gods apply various unique effects or limitations on gameplay.

The game features turn-based combat where the player queues up actions and attacks to be used against hostile creatures, many of which are based on creatures from Japanese horror manga or urban legends, such as Kuchisake-onna. The game also incorporates adventure game and roguelike elements through its exploration and puzzle-solving mechanics.

== Development and release ==
World of Horror is the debut project of Polish developer Paweł Koźmiński, also known as Panstasz. Initially conceived as a card board game, it draws inspiration from the works of H. P. Lovecraft and Junji Ito, 1970s and 1980s Japanese horror, direct-to-video films, as well as The Thing (1982) and The Fly (1986). Finding the card board game format too time-consuming, Koźmiński later reimagined the project as a video game, developing it during his spare time while working as a dentist. A publishing deal with Ysbryd Games eventually allowed him to pursue World of Horror full-time.

Cassandra Khaw, known for her work on Sunless Skies (2019) and Wasteland 3 (2020), provided additional writing. The Old Gods, who serve as antagonists in World of Horror, were partly inspired by the deities in Lovecraft's Cthulhu Mythos. For the art design, Koźmiński created thousands of images using Microsoft Paint. He found the limitations of the editor "actually really inspiring and somehow relaxing", noting that it "really force[s] you to get creative with it, which is a huge thing". He opted for a 1-bit pixel art style to emulate Ito's manga and to evoke the aesthetic of early computer interfaces, such as those of the PC-8800, PC-9801, and Macintosh II. The game was developed using the GameMaker Studio 2 engine.

Between 2016 and 2019, Koźmiński released several World of Horror demos on itch.io. He announced the game in July 2018 with a teaser trailer on YouTube and showcased the project at various events, including PAX. It was launched in early access in February 2020, followed by numerous updates based on player feedback to expand both story and gameplay elements. (Note: Attributed to multiple references:) The full game was released on 19 October 2023 for macOS and Windows, after several delays—initially from its original 2019 release date to late 2020, then to summer 2023, and finally to its October date. The soundtrack, composed by Sebastian Zybowski and Joseph Bailey, was released on 24 October. Nintendo Switch and PlayStation 4 versions followed on 26 October, with the physical Switch edition including an instruction manual and the Old Gods art card set. Fangamer also launched a line of World of Horror merchandise, featuring items such as clothing.

== Reception ==
=== Critical response ===
Reception

Aggregate scores
Aggregator	Score
Metacritic	NS: 81/100; PS4: 76/100; Win: 77/100
OpenCritic	79% recommend

Review scores
Publication	Score
Destructoid	8/10
Edge	7/10
Eurogamer	3/5
Famitsu	29/40
Gamezebo	80/100
Nintendo Life	8/10
PC Gamer (US)	85/100
Play	7/10
RPGamer	4/5
TechRadar	4/5
TouchArcade	4/5

World of Horror received "generally favorable" reviews from critics, according to review aggregator Metacritic. OpenCritic determined that 79% of critics recommended the game. In Japan, four critics from Famitsu gave the game a total score of 29 out of 40. It was praised for its narrative and visuals, with some criticisms directed at its gameplay, particularly the combat. Kerry Brunskill of PC Gamer deemed World of Horror a "superb horror adventure" and one of 2023's best horror games, commending its creativity. Alice Bell of Rock Paper Shotgun (RPS) called it a "remarkable horror game", while Shaun Musgrave of TouchArcade considered it a horror masterpiece and a must-play for genre fans. Mitch Vogel of Nintendo Life described the game as "one of the most unique roguelites" for Switch, while TechRadar's Alexander Chatziioannou praised it as "constantly surprising, genuinely unsettling, and truly unlike anything you've played". Zoey Handley of Destructoid acknowledged the game's strong Junji Ito influences but felt that it still maintained a distinct creative vision and "seems to hit all its goals". Matt Wales of Eurogamer found the game captivating and atmospheric, despite "fleet, flimsy, and forgettable" moments. Kotaku's Ashley Bardhan praised the game as "well-oiled" and commended its avoidance of horror clichés. While several reviewers applauded World of Horror's blend of narrative and gameplay elements, Bardhan found the game "too stuffed", feeling overwhelmed by its abundance of content.

Sho Roberts of Gamezebo described the game's narrative as "incredibly immersive", a sentiment echoed by TechRadar's Chatziioannou, who felt that it "brilliantly channels the confusion and uncertainty of a hapless teenager faced with unfathomable entities of limitless power". Brunskill of PC Gamer praised the narrative for evoking "an unsettling feeling of being lost or hunted" and highlighted the fragmented storytelling as one of the game's strengths. Wales of Eurogamer called the "deliciously varied" mysteries as the game's "bloody, mangled heart", though he noted that they "lose their lustre" during playthroughs. While Wales criticized the narrative choices as "perfunctory", Nintendo Life's Vogel found them "impactful".

Vogel of Nintendo Life lauded the role-playing elements and overall gameplay design. Wales of Eurogamer praised the modding support and the "pleasingly flexible" combat, though he noted that the enemies were "dim as a bucket", as their predictable behavior led to repetitive tactics. Engadget's Cheyenne Macdonald found the combat "engaging enough", though occasionally "a bit frustrating". Bell of RPS and Oscar Taylor-Kent of Play criticized the combat, with Bell describing it as repetitive and Taylor-Kent deeming it "maybe [World of Horror]'s biggest flaw". Gamezebo's Roberts appreciated the custom story feature but was frustrated by a save bug that reset the progress a few times.

Chatziioannou of TechRadar praised the game's investigation mechanic as its "most ingenious" feature, highlighting its integration with other gameplay elements. However, he found the alternate endings underwhelming and described the differences between playable characters as "mostly trivial". Brunskill of PC Gamer lauded the replay system as a "practical, patience-saving alternative to the usual roguelike setup". She also described World of Horror as "enjoyably unpredictable", adding that, despite its short playthroughs, it is "a very easy game to play all night long". Edge likened the game's replayability to revisiting a favorite horror novel or film but noted that the "fear factor dissipates over successive runs". The publication also criticized the roguelike elements as a "slightly awkward fit". Both TouchArcade's Musgrave and Nintendo Life's Vogel expressed disappointment over the lack of touchscreen support on Switch and Steam Deck.

Bardhan of Kotaku and Macdonald of Engadget lauded the game's visual design, highlighting its emulation of Ito's style. Macdonald further noted that the game "truly excels [...] in its attention to horrifying detail". Vogel of Nintendo Life described the visuals as a "fantastic companion" to the text, enhancing the game's bleak tone. Gamezebo's Roberts commended the "bold graphical choices", emphasizing that while World of Horror appear as "another pixel game", it is "much more than that". Chatziioannou of TechRadar found the presentation "striking" and "delightfully eerie", with emphasis on how it captured contemporary anxieties. Roberts and Destructoid's Handley both praised the music, with Handley noting that it "does a lot to fit the mysteries" and calling it "well executed". Conversely, Edge argued that the music was "too grating" at times.

=== Accolades ===
World of Horror was selected as the Best of Show at the Media Indie Exchange showcase during PAX West 2018. At IndieCade 2023, it was nominated for both the Audio Design Spotlight Award and the Visual Design Spotlight Award, winning the latter. World of Horror appeared on several Best Horror Games of 2023 lists, including those by Fangoria, IGN, and Screen Rant. It was also named one of the Best Games, Best Turn-Based RPGs, and Best PC Games of 2023 by NPR, TheGamer, and The Verge, respectively.

Award	Date	Category	Result	Ref.
IndieCade	5 November 2023	Audio Design Spotlight Award	Nominated	
IndieCade	5 November 2023	Visual Design Spotlight Award	Won	

== See also ==
- Ditherpunk
