= The Chosen and the Beautiful =

2021 novel by Nghi Vo

- Author: Nghi Vo
- Language: English
- Publisher: Tordotcom
- Publication date: June 1, 2021
- Pages: 288
- ISBN: 9781250784780

The Chosen and the Beautiful is Nghi Vo's debut novel, published in 2021. The story is a fantasy retelling of the classic American novel The Great Gatsby. It is narrated by Jordan Baker, a minor character in the original novel, re-imagined as a Vietnamese immigrant with suppressed magical powers. It was nominated for the Locus Award for Best First Novel. It was also nominated for Goodreads Choice Award Nominee for Fantasy in 2021. In 2022, it was in the 15 top rated books by LGBTQ+ authors and 20 top rated books by Asian-American Pacific Islander on Goodreads.
