= When the Tiger Came Down the Mountain =

2020 fantasy novella by Nghi Vo

- Author: Nghi Vo
- Language: English
- Series: Singing Hills Cycle #2
- Genre: Fantasy
- Publisher: Tordotcom
- Publication date: December 8, 2020
- Publication place: United States
- Media type: Print
- Pages: 128 pp
- ISBN: 9781250786135 (1st paperback)
- OCLC: 1153000530
- Dewey Decimal: 813/.6
- LC Class: PS3622.O23 W54 2020
- Preceded by: The Empress of Salt and Fortune
- Followed by: Into the Riverlands

When the Tiger Came Down the Mountain is a 2020 fantasy novella by Nghi Vo. It is the second novella in the Singing Hills Cycle, serving as a standalone sequel to The Empress of Salt and Fortune (2020).

== Plot ==
Cleric Chih and their guide Si-yu ride a mammoth to a way station. Along the way they are attacked by three wild tigers. Chih and Si-yu flee into a barn. The tigers’ leader, Ho Sinh Loan, shape-shifts into a human woman. To prevent the tigers from eating them, Chih tells them a story.

Chih narrates the tale of Dieu, a young scholar, and her wife Ho Thi Thao, a shapeshifting tiger. The tigers frequently interrupt with their own version, which sometimes disagrees with the human version of the story. They agree on the basic shape of the story. Dieu travels to the city of Ahnfi to take an imperial examination. Along the way she meets the tiger Ho Thi Thao. They are married according to tiger law. When they reach the city, Dieu betrays Thao but regrets her choice. They reunite and leave the city together.

When Chih's story is over, the tigers attack. Chih and Si-yu are rescued by a group of mammoth herders.

== Major themes ==
The Chicago Review of Books stated that the novel "is particularly rich in the polysemy of feeding: as a clear metaphor for sex, as a simple fulfilmment of need, and as violence." The same review comments that it is similar to vampire and werewolf stories in that it evokes "the intersection of violence and queer desire". Despite this, there is "room for sweetness here, and complexity".

According to Alex Brown, the novella explores the nature of truth and storytelling. The human version of the tale centers Dieu and casts Ho Thi Thao as a villain; the tigers' version focuses on Ho Thi Thao's side of the story. Even among the tiger sisters, there are disagreements as to the proper telling of the story.

Brown writes that "Ultimately, there is no “truth” and there is no “fiction;” there is only truth as fiction and fiction as truth." Brown also writes that the novella actively pushes against Eurocentric constraints in its portrayal of queerness.

== Style ==
Chih's tale serves as a frame story for the tale of Dieu and Ho Thi Thao. According to a review for the Chicago Review of Books, the novella's structure echoes One Thousand and One Nights. Chih takes the role of storyteller in order to stave off death. The reviewer points out that Chih's story and "The Marriage of the Tiger and the Scholar" are portrayed differently by the text. Dieu's story is "treated somewhat like a folk tale ... the novella never jumps “all the way in” to give us what Ho Thi Tao or Dieu “really” experienced."

== Reception ==
The Chicago Review of Books called the novella "an incredibly, quietly skilled and entertaining accomplishment", praising its worldbuilding, characterization, and subversion of gender norms. Publishers Weekly gave the novella a starred review, praising Vo's use of the frame story and calling it a "lush, sophisticated story of queer love and survival". Alex Brown of Tor.com called the work "a nearly perfect example of a novella done well".

Anuska G of The Nerd Daily praised the novel's "achingly beautiful" exploration of queer love and the "lush and detailed worldbuilding". The same reviewer noted that the novel "didn't resonate with me" as much as the prequel.

== Awards ==
Year	Award	Category	Result	Ref.
2022	RUSA CODES Reading List	Fantasy	Shortlisted	
