= FIYAH Literary Magazine =

American-based magazine

- Executive Editor: DaVaun Sanders
- Former editors: Justina Ireland
- Publisher: Troy L. Wiggins
- Founded: September 2016
- Country: United States
- Language: English
- Website: fiyahlitmag.com

FIYAH Magazine of Black Speculative Fiction, or simply FIYAH, is an American-based quarterly electronic magazine of Black speculative fiction. The magazine was announced in September 2016, inspired by the 1920s experimental periodical FIRE! created by Wallace Thurman. It was developed by a group of writers led by Troy L. Wiggins, L.D. Lewis, and Justina Ireland. The first edition of the magazine was published in 2017. FIYAH has been nominated for the Hugo Award for Best Semiprozine seven times, most recently in 2025, and it won the Hugo Award for Best Semi-Prozine in 2021.

== Publication history ==
Announced in 2016, FIYAH Literary Magazine was inspired by Fire!!, an African-American literary magazine created by Wallace Thurman in the 1920s. The expressed goal of FIYAH was to create a publishing space for Black science fiction and fantasy (SFF) writers, who had been marginalized out of the mainstream SFF market. Seeking work by both native and diasporic Africans "that reject[s] regressive ideas of blackness, respectability politics, and stereotype," FIYAH was developed by a group of writers led by Troy L. Wiggins and L.D. Lewis, as well as Justina Ireland, the magazine's first editor. The first edition of the magazine was published in 2017.

Produced quarterly, 25 issues had been released as of February 2023. Items published include prose stories, essays and poetry, and many of the issues are themed (e.g. "Hair", "Chains", "Haunting and Horrors", "Food and Cuisine", and "Palestinian Solidarity"). While the magazine originally compensated authors with flat rates, in 2020 FIYAH began paying $.08 per word, considered a "professional" rate by the Science Fiction and Fantasy Writers Association.

2020 was also the year FIYAH saw a dramatic increase in readership: subscriptions rose from 204 in 2019 to 1,769, continuing to rise through 2021 with 2,122 subscribers. The trend reversed, however, in 2022 with subscriptions plummeting to 1,115 subscribers, in part reflecting a genre-wide recession.

== Reception ==
By 2018, FIYAH had already distinguished itself as a magazine of notable quality: six of the 17 stories published that year were on Locus Magazine's recommended reading list, one of the highest ratios of any SFF magazine, professional or otherwise. FIYAH has maintained this record throughout its publication, with seven of 24 stories making the recommended list in 2021, and five of 19 getting recommended in 2022. Tade Thompson's "Yard Dog", which appeared in the Summer 2018 issue, was anthologized in The Best Science Fiction & Fantasy of the Year: Volume Thirteen in 2019.

== Projects ==
In 2017, the magazine launched its Presence of Blackness Score Project to track the progress of short SFF markets in improving their accessibility to and publication of Black authors.

In 2020, FIYAH produced the inaugural FIYAHCON, a virtual convention held 17–18 October to "celebrate the perspectives and contributions of BIPOC in speculative fiction". FIYAH also created the Ignyte Awards to celebrate efforts towards inclusion and diversity within speculative fiction, the first 15 of which were awarded at FIYAHCON. A second virtual FIYAHCON was held 18–19 September 2021, at which a second round of Ignyte Award winners was announced. In 2022, the third round of Ignyte Awards were given at a dedicated ceremony hosted by Brett Lambert on 17 September.

In August 2020, Tor.com announced the production of an SFF flash fiction anthology by Black authors in collaboration with FIYAH. Called Breathe FIYAH, it was co-edited by Lambert and DaVaun Sanders and released for free on the Tor.com website in October 2020.

In 2022, FIYAH, Tor.com, and the LeVar Burton Reads podcast collaborated in producing an "Origins and Encounters"-themed SFF contest. Three finalist short stories were selected for publication on the Tor.com site.

== Awards ==
The 2018 World Fantasy Special Award—Non-professional was awarded to Ireland and Wiggins for their work on the FIYAH. The same year, Issue No. 1 cover artist Geneva Barton won the Hugo Award for Best Fan Artist.

Since 2019, the magazine has received six consecutive nominations for the Hugo Award for Best Semiprozine, winning in 2021.

In 2022, the following staff were listed as co-finalists:

- Publisher Troy L Wiggins
- Executive editor DaVaun Sanders
- Managing editor Eboni Dunbar
- Poetry editor B. Sharise Moore
- Reviews editor and social media manager Brent Lambert
- Art director L. D. Lewis
- Web editor Chavonne Brown
- Non-fiction editor Margeaux Weston
- Guest editors Summer Farah and Nadia Shammas
- Acquiring editors Kaleb Russell, Rebecca McGee, Kerine Wint, Joshua Morley, Emmalia Harrington, Genine Tyson, Tonya R. Moore, Danny Lore
- Technical assistant Nelson Rolon

In 2021 Troy L. Wiggins was awarded the Kate Wilhelm Solstice Award by the SWFA, citing his work as publisher and former co-editor of the managzine.

== See also ==
- List of science fiction magazines
- List of literary magazines
