= Ignyte Awards =

Annual literary award

Ignyte Award
- Awarded for: Best science fiction, fantasy and horror works of the previous year.
- Country: United States
- Presented by: FIYAH Literary Magazine
- First award: 2020; 6 years ago
- Website: ignyteawards.fiyahlitmag.com

The Ignyte Awards are an annual literary award for the best science fiction, fantasy, and horror works and achievements of the previous year. Established in 2020 by writers L. D. Lewis and Suzan Palumbo as an off-shoot of FIYAH Literary Magazine, the awards aim to celebrate diversity and inclusion in the speculative fiction genre, and are presented in 15 categories spanning fiction, non-fiction and community service. Trophies are awarded to winners at FIYAHCON, an annual speculative fiction convention focused on black, indigenous and people-of-color perspectives in the genre.

== Process ==
The Ignyte Awards are part-juried and part-public vote: finalists are selected by the convention committee, and winners are then determined in an online ballot.

== Reception ==
In 2024, Doris V. Sutherland of WWAC noted that the Ignyte Awards are relatively new, but "stand out from the crowd" in part by including categories not recognized by other awards. These include the award for Outstanding Speculative Poetry and Outstanding Creative Nonfiction.

In 2025, the Ignyte Awards were themselves awarded a Special Locus Award, the citation being for "Celebrating Excellence in Genre". In a speech at the 2025 awards ceremony, senior editor Arley Sorg stated that the Ignyte Awards "attempt to correct representative gaps in traditional spec lit awards and have grown into a coveted and cherished addition to the awards landscape."

== Categories ==
Active Categories
Category	Description
Ignyte Award for Outstanding Novel – Adult	Awarded for works over 40,000 words for an adult audience, written by up to 2 authors
Ignyte Award for Outstanding Novel – Young Adult	Awarded for works over 40,000 words for a young adult audience, written by up to 2 authors
Ignyte Award for Outstanding Middle Grade	Awarded for longform works for the middle grade market
Ignyte Award for Outstanding Novella	Awarded for works between 17,500 - 39,999 words
Ignyte Award for Outstanding Novelette	Awarded for works between 7,500 - 17.499 words
Ignyte Award for Outstanding Short Story	Awarded for works between 2,000 - 7,499 words
Ignyte Award for Outstanding Speculative Poetry	Awarded for single poems which are speculative in genre
Ignyte Award – Critics Award	Awarded for critical analysis of speculative fiction works, at either a professional or fan level
Ignyte Award for Outstanding Fiction Podcast	Awarded for podcasts which produce, host, or perform original fiction as at least 75% of their annual output
Ignyte Award for Outstanding Anthology/Collected Works	Awarded for either an anthology (featuring multiple authors) or a collection (featuring works by a single author)
Ignyte Award for Outstanding Creative Nonfiction	Awarded for essays or nonfiction academic works related to the field of speculative fiction
Ember Award	Recognizes individuals for their extended bodies of work which have not historically been recognized by awards entities
Ignyte Award — Community Award	Awarded to an individual, team, or organization whose focus has aided in diversifying and making healthier the field of speculative fiction by emphasizing inclusion.

Former Categories
Category	Dates	Description
Ignyte Award for Outstanding Artist	2020-2025	Recognizes a single artist for their professional output. An artist's entire portfolio may be considered, but must have at least 1 commissioned piece in the nominated year.
Ignyte Award for Outstanding Comics Team	2020-2025	Awarded to teams, including writers, artists, and letters, which work to produce an eligible comic volume.
