= The House of Rust =

2021 novel by Khadija Abdalla Bajaber

- Author: Khadija Abdalla Bajaber
- Language: English
- Genre: Magical realism; fantasy
- Published: 19 October 2021
- Publisher: Graywolf Press
- Publication place: Kenya
- Pages: 272 (Paperback)
- Awards: 2022 Ursula K. Le Guin Prize
- ISBN: 9781644450680

The House of Rust is a 2021 novel, the debut novel by Khadija Abdalla Bajaber. It tells the story of Aisha, a young girl who rescues her missing father and later searches for the titular House of Rust. It won the 2022 Ursula K. Le Guin Prize for fiction.

== Plot ==
Aisha lives with her father Ali, a fisherman, and her grandmother, Hababa Swafiya. Two crows named Whitebreast and Gololi observe her life, commenting on Aisha and her interactions with other citizens of Mombasa. One day, Ali fails to return from a fishing trip. Hababa Swafiya believes that he has died; she plans to declare him dead after five days.

Hamza, a talking cat, offers to help Aisha find her father. Hamza sings to the ocean, summoning a ship made of bones. They set sail and a sea serpent who was once Ali's fishing companion. The serpent discusses its friendship and sometimes-contentious relationship with Ali. Next, they meet the Sunken King, a creature made from sunken ships who speaks with the voices of those drowned at sea. Finally, they encounter Baba wa Papa, the monstrous father of sharks.

Baba wa Papa taunts Aisha. She cuts him with a piece of her bone ship, and the blood in the water causes his own shark children to turn and attack him. Aisha finds a fishing net; inside is an unconscious Ali. She and Hamza sail back past the Sunken King and the sea serpent. They are attacked by sea creatures including disembodied eyeballs, but Aisha fights them off. They return to Mombasa.

As they return to shore, Hamza asks Aisha to leave her father and accompany him to the House of Rust. He declares that he will never ask again; this is her only chance to accept his offer. Aisha declines, preferring to stay with her father.

Aisha and Ali are found by a local shark hunter named Zubair. Zubair offers to save Ali by cutting open his heart and removing his love for the sea. Aisha agrees. When Zubair cuts open Ali's heart, he releases a school of feathered fish. Ali recovers, becoming a carpenter. Zubair and Hababa Swafiya marry. Aisha keeps a feathered fish and a disembodied eyeball under her bed. She determines to track down Hamza and find the House of Rust.

Aisha rejects a marriage proposal from a local boy, angering her grandmother. Meanwhile, local animals become concerned about the cursed eyeball kept by Aisha. They determine to awaken Almassi, a snake demon, to neutralize the threat. Crows break into Aisha's bedroom, releasing the trapped eyeball. The eyeball kills Gololi. Whitebreast eats it and is severely injured. He is rescued by Almassi.

Aisha and Almassi engage in a contest of riddles, which she fails. Almassi separates Aisha from her shadow. The shadow behaves perfectly, fooling Hababa Swafiya into believing that it is the real Aisha. Aisha plans to leave Mombasa to search for the House of Rust. Hababa Swafiya realizes that the shadow is not truly her granddaughter. She puts aside her disapproval of Aisha's plans and wishes her a safe journey. Aisha's shadow reattaches itself. Almassi gives Whitebreast to Aisha as a companion for her journey. They sail off to search for the House of Rust.

== Background and publication history ==
The story began during the night of a power outage, when Bajaber's mother asked her to tell the family a story. Bajaber began Aisha's story as an oral narrative and soon decided to begin writing it down. An early draft of the novel ended at the halfway point, after Aisha rescues her father from the sea.

In 2018, Bajaber was selected as the winner of the inaugural Graywolf Press Africa Prize. This prize is awarded to a first novel manuscript, written by an African author primarily residing in Africa.

The manuscript for The House of Rust was chosen from nearly 200 submissions by judge A. Igoni Barrett, author of Blackass, in conjunction with the Graywolf editors. Bajaber received a $12,000 advance. In addition, 66th&2nd agreed to publish The House of Rust in Italy.

== Reception and awards ==
Laura Sackton of BookPage wrote that the book is "enchanting and sometimes delightfully odd." Sackton noted that the book might be disorienting at first, given the "many names, overlapping stories and shifts in perspective." The review found that the book's structure was a strength, as it paralleled the disorientation experienced by Aisha as she navigated the mundane and magical realities of the book. Sackton praised the novel's duality, concluding that it is "both a realistic drama about familial expectation, lineage and grief, as well as a darkly whimsical adventure about monsters who hold grudges and the courage it takes to face your fears head-on."

Carey Baraka of The Johannesburg Review of Books called the book a feminist novel, comparing it to Parched Earth by Elieshi Lema. Both books feature a young protagonist "in a conservative East African community with a disdain for tradition for tradition’s sake." Baraka also wrote extensively of the ways in which the novel reflects the city of Mombasa, incorporating local beliefs about cats, crows, and djinn. Samir Jeraj of The London Magazine also commented on the combination of supernatural and realistic elements, as well as the ways in which the book reflected elements of Mombasan culture. In an interview with Jeraj, the author stated "The supernatural is something that’s not all that separate in terms of culture and religion and belief ... I love fairy tales and folk stories the most; anything that brings in the extraordinary and makes it believable."

John Gail of The New York Times praised the character of Aisha, calling her "everything you want in a heroine: cunning and headstrong, but also fallible." Gail also praised the novel's prose, noting that "[e]very sentence of this novel could be a verse" and calling Bajaber a "born storyteller."

Kirkus Reviews called the book "magical realism, Kenya-style." The review recommended the novel to readers even if they are not fans of the magical realism genre, stating that "this window into Hadrami culture should at least stoke your curiosity."

The novel won the inaugural Ursula K. Le Guin Prize in 2022.
