= Khadija Abdalla Bajaber =

Kenyan writer

- Born: Mombasa, Kenya
- Occupations: Poet; Novelist
- Writing career
- Language: English
- Notable work: The House of Rust
- Notable awards: 2022 Ursula K. Le Guin Prize

Khadija Abdullah Bajaber is a Mombasa-born poet and novelist. She is best known for her 2021 novel The House of Rust, for which she was awarded the 2018 Graywolf Press Africa Prize. The novel later won the 2022 Ursula K. Le Guin Prize.

== Early life and education ==
Bajaber is a Kenyan of Hadhrami descent. She writes about the ill-documented history of the Hadhrami diaspora. Her work has been published in Brainstorm Kenya and Enkare Review. She lives in Mombasa, Kenya and holds a degree in journalism.

== Career ==
In 2018, Bajaber was selected as the winner of the inaugural Graywolf Press Africa Prize. This prize is awarded to a first novel manuscript, written by an African author primarily residing in Africa. At the time, she was the assistant poetry editor for the East African issue of Panorama Travel Journal.

The manuscript for The House of Rust was chosen from nearly 200 submissions by judge A. Igoni Barrett, author of Blackass, in conjunction with the Graywolf editors. Bajaber received a $12,000 advance. In addition, 66th&2nd agreed to publish The House of Rust in Italy, a partnership that was planned continue with the Graywolf Press Africa Prize going forward.

Judge A. Igoni Barrett said: "The House of Rust is an exhilarating journey into the imagination of an author for whom the fantastic is not only written about, it is performed on the page. Khadija Abdalla Bajaber has infused new life into the age-old story of adventure on the high seas—with this heroic first novel she has struck deep into that mythic realm explored by everyone from Homer to Hemingway."

In October 2022, The House of Rust won the inaugural Ursula K. Le Guin Prize for Fiction. The jury for the award "praised Bajaber’s transcendent writing and innovative, transporting story, saying: 'Scene after scene is gleaming, textured, utterly devoid of cliché and arresting in its wisdom. The novel's structure is audacious and its use of language is to die for.'"

In 2024, Bajaber participated in Macondo Literary Festival. She led a session "that explored the concept of using the familiar to write the strange — the concept of grounding unusual or fantastical elements in relatable experiences or settings."

As of 2025, Bajaber is the assistant fiction editor for Panorama: The Journal of Intelligent Travel.

== Works ==
Novels

- The House of Rust. Graywolf Press. 19 October 2021. ISBN 9781644450680.

Poetry

- — (2021). "With(out)". In Nadra Mabrouk; K. Eltinaé (eds.). 20.35 Africa: An Anthology of Contemporary Poetry (PDF). Vol. 4. 20.35 Africa.
- — (2025). "the tiger's bride". Lolwe.

Short fiction

- — (9 Dec 2019). "Kiziwi". Down River Road. No. 2.
- — (31 Aug 2020). "Gujama". A Long House.
