= Ursula K. Le Guin Prize =

English-language literary award

- Official awards logo
- Awarded for: A work of fiction. The award is intended to recognize "realists of a larger reality, who can imagine real grounds for hope and see alternatives to how we live now."
- Reward: $25,000.00
- Established: 2022; 4 years ago
- Website: ursulakleguin.com/book-prize-1

The Ursula K. Le Guin Prize, established in 2022, is an annual, English-language literary award presented in honor of Ursula K. Le Guin. The $25,000 prize is awarded to an author for a single work of "imaginative fiction". The award is meant to honor authors who "can imagine real grounds for hope and see alternatives to how we live now".

== Eligibility ==
Books may be nominated for the prize by anyone and will be judged based on how well the work "reflects the concepts and ideas that were central to Ursula's own work, including but not limited to: hope, equity, and freedom; non-violence and alternatives to conflict; and a holistic view of humanity's place in the natural world".

To be eligible, a book must be a "book-length work of imaginative fiction written by a single author", "[p]ublished in the U.S. in English or in translation to English", and "[p]ublished in the specific window for each year's prize". After a writer wins the award once, they cannot be nominated for the prize again.

Additionally, the award "give[s] weight to writers whose access to resources may be limited due to race, gender, age, class or other factors; who are working outside of institutional frameworks like MFA programs; who live outside of cultural centers such as New York; and who have not yet been widely recognized for their work".

== Recipients ==
^{*} Winner · ^{†} Finalist · Shortlist

Ursula K. Le Guin Prize winners and finalists
Year	Author	Title	Ref.
2022	Khadija Abdalla Bajaber*	The House of Rust	
2022	Sequoia Nagamatsu^{†}	How High We Go in the Dark	
2022	Catherynne M. Valente^{†}	The Past Is Red	
2022	Cynthia Zhang	After the Dragons	
2022	Matt Bell	Appleseed	
2022	Adrian Tchaikovsky	Elder Race	
2022	Olga Ravn, trans. by Martin Aitken	The Employees	
2022	Darcie Little Badger	A Snake Falls to Earth	
2022	Michelle Ruiz Keil	Summer in the City of Roses	
2023	Rebecca Campbell*	Arboreality	
2023	Christiane M. Andrews	Wolfish	
2023	Nicola Griffith	Spear	
2023	Yuri Herrera	Ten Planets	
2023	Simon Jimenez	The Spear Cuts Through Water	
2023	Zain Khalid	Brother Alive	
2023	Akil Kumarasamy	Meet Us by the Roaring Sea	
2023	R. B. Lemberg	Geometries of Belonging	
2023	Yvette Lisa Ndlovu	Drinking from Graveyard Wells	
2024	Anne de Marcken*	It Lasts Forever and Then It's Over	
2024	Vajra Chandrasekera	The Saint of Bright Doors	
2024	Sarah Cypher	The Skin and Its Girl	
2024	Samantha Harvey	Orbital	
2024	Alissa Hattman	Sift	
2024	Alaya Dawn Johnson	The Library of Broken Worlds	
2024	Micaiah Johnson	Those Beyond the Wall	
2024	Premee Mohamed	The Siege of Burning Grass	
2024	Emily Tesh	Some Desperate Glory	
2024	Nghi Vo	Mammoths at the Gates	
2025	Vajra Chandrasekera*	Rakesfall	
2025	Andrea Hairston	Archangels of Funk	
2025	Nalo Hopkinson	Blackheart Man	
2025	Margaret Killjoy	The Sapling Cage	
2025	Jared Pechaček	The West Passage	
2025	Eden Robins	Remember You Will Die	
2025	Nghi Vo	The City in Glass	
2025	Ursula Whitcher	North Continent Ribbon	
2026	Pip Adam	Audition	
2026	William Alexander	Sunward	
2026	Christopher Caldwell	Call and Response	
2026	Bora Chung, trans. by Anton Hur	Midnight Timetable	
2026	Hiron Ennes	The Works of Vermin	
2026	Isaac Fellman	Notes from a Regicide	
2026	Tashan Mehta	Mad Sisters of Esi	
2026	Premee Mohamed	One Message Remains	
2026	Claire North	Slow Gods	
