= Akil Kumarasamy =

American author and professor

- Education: Barnard College; University of Michigan (MFA)
- Occupations: Author, assistant professor
- Writing career
- Years active: 2010s – present
- Notable works: Half Gods; Meet Us By The Roaring Sea
- Notable awards: 2018 The Story Prize Spotlight Award; 2021–2022 Annual Bard Fiction Prize
- Website: akilk.com

Akil Kumarasamy is an American author and an assistant professor in the Masters of Fine Arts Program in Creative Writing at Rutgers School of Arts and Sciences-Newark. Her collection of short stories Half Gods won The Story Prize Spotlight Award and the 2021–2022 Annual Bard Fiction Prize. Her novel Meet Us by the Roaring Sea was released in August 2022.

== Early life and education ==
Kumarasamy grew up in Dismal Swamp, New Jersey, in a largely South Asian community. She had no pets and no direct access to wildlife as a child, but initially wanted to be a zoologist. Bhavye Doye writes for Open Magazine that Kumarasamy "grew up among migrants and refugees who had packed their belongings and sorrows when they were cleaved from their homelands, and embodied within themselves a subcontinent of unarticulated experiences."

She graduated from Barnard College in 2010 and completed her Masters of Fine Arts in creative writing at the University of Michigan.

== Career ==
In fall 2020, Kumarasamy became an assistant professor in the MFA program in creative writing at Rutgers School of Arts and Sciences-Newark. Her past teaching experience includes the Helen Zell Writers' Program at the University of Michigan. Her fellowships include the University of East Anglia, the Provincetown Fine Arts Work Center, Yaddo, and the Schomburg Center for Research in Black Culture. She was awarded the Annual Bard Fiction Prize for her collection of short stories Half Gods, which includes an appointment as a writer in residence at Bard College for a semester during the 2021–2022 academic year.

After an interview with Kumarasamy, Zena Agha writes for the Asian American Writers' Workshop Magazine, "Hearing about her literary journey confirmed to me that success for women writers is not a finite thing. Kumarasamy, like those who came before and those who will come after, is engaged in the radical act of speaking poetic truths to people who are unaccustomed to listening to them." Kumarasamy discussed the impact of her childhood experience on her writing with Urvashi Bahuguna of Scroll.in, stating, "I think that gave me a more nuanced take on brownness. Instead of seeing it in the margins, I was able to view it from a place of centrality."

In addition to Half Gods, she wrote a novel, titled Meet Us by the Roaring Sea, that was published by Farrar, Straus and Giroux in August 2022.

== Critical reception ==
=== Half Gods ===
Half Gods was named in the "Best of 2018: Short story collections" by Scroll.in, one of "6 Summer Books That Explore the Immigrant Experience" by The Village Voice, and an Editor's Choice by The New York Times, as well as featured on the "Lest We Forget: A Reading List" by PEN America, "Four terrific fiction debuts by Asian-American women not to miss" by USA Today, and "Short Story Collections That Should Be on Your Must-Read List" by Redbook.

In a review for The New York Times, Tania James writes, "As Akil Kumarasamy pointed out in a 2017 interview, the Tamil equivalent of goodbye is poyittu varen, meaning “I’ll go and return." These are parting words especially suited to the refugee: ever running away, ever looking back. Kumarasamy poignantly illustrates this tension in her debut story collection". In a review for the Hindustan Times, Sonali Mujumdar writes that the novel "has its primordial roots in that tumultuous time, but the larger canvas is about exile, adopted cultures, about families and people that have crossed continents to make new lives, colliding awkwardly with each other in their chosen lands," and "Kumarasamy rips open wounds, lays them bare, washes and wipes, and secures her creations; disjointed pieces of trauma and treasures, that come together to piece an irregular whole. Here the mortals too have feet of clay in a world full of poetic injustice."

Katy Waldman writes for The New Yorker, "The book doubles as a chilling history lesson for readers unfamiliar with the bloody conflict between Sri Lanka’s Tamils, a northern minority, and its Sinhalese majority," and "More than a hundred thousand people were slain in the Sri Lankan civil war, between 1983 and 2009." Michael Patrick Brady writes for The Millions, "More than 800,000 people were displaced, with many fleeing the country as refugees to India, the United Kingdom, and the United States," and "Kumarasamy explores what it means to be made to feel like a foreigner in one’s own country, a theme made all the more affecting by recent events."

Publishers Weekly states, "Kumarasamy’s prose is gorgeous and assured, capable of rendering both major tragedy (war, the dissolution of a marriage, the loss of a child) and minor tragedy (a botched effort at matchmaking, a pitying Christmas invitation) with care and precision. Though the stories can sometimes blend together, the writing is strong throughout, resulting in a wonderful, auspicious debut." Aditya Sudarshan writes in a review for The Hindu, "Half Gods is certainly an extraordinary achievement, even an epochal one. Perhaps never before in history could such a work have been created, a humanly conceived book-as-machine, properly intimidating in its refusal to explain itself, and feigning to satisfy a profound human desire, by making the stuff of our little lives into something rich and dense."

Kalyan Nadiminti writes for the Los Angeles Review of Books, "Notwithstanding its allusive opacity and predictable prose, Kumarasamy's debut moves in the right direction, provoking serious questions about the writing of human rights and the ways in which literature bears the burden of representing unsolvable political problems." Kirkus Reviews writes, "While the book is moving and the writing elegant and clear, the collection begins to feel almost like a writing exercise, moving from third-person to first-person and back; when it finally comes to the rarely used second person [...], the effect isn't nearly as surprising as it might otherwise have been. It might be that Kumarasamy's control on the stories is too tight. One wonders what might happen if she were to loosen her grip."

=== Meet Us by the Roaring Sea ===
A Publishers Weekly review states, "Kumarasamy's dazzling if sometimes unwieldy debut novel [...] follows a young woman as she tries to unpack the past amid an unforgiving near future", and "Kumarasamy's gorgeous prose and quiet meditations on memory will enthrall readers." In the Kenyon Review, Elinam Agbo describes the novel as "a lyrical, speculative novel set in a near future where violence is as unrelenting a reality as it is in our present moment."

Melissa Chadburn writes for The New York Times that the book "alternates between the near-future, second-person perspective of Aya, a 26-year-old A.I. trainer in Queens, and passages from a manuscript she is translating from Tamil into English", and "Kumarasamy’s quirky language and wit are dazzling." In a review for the Los Angeles Times, Ilana Masad writes that the book, "is under 300 pages, and there is certainly a lot going on, but it all feels beautifully balanced — chapters threaded together nimbly, the translated manuscript and the protagonist’s life echoing each other."

Jonathan Russell Clark describes the novel in a review for the Star Tribune as "a brazenly complex, labyrinthinely structured, deeply philosophical, thematically ambitious novel, and although it may not be the breeziest read, it is also a masterpiece that more than confirms the promise of "Half Gods."" In the Chicago Review of Books, Malavika Praseed writes, "this is a book that commands a greater focus and closer attention than I anticipated as a reader. And while individual passages shimmer and terrify, the book as a whole leaves dangling threads that go beyond the unanswered questions of thought-provoking narrative. We never truly comprehend our protagonist, just as our protagonist rarely seems to comprehend the world around her."

Meet Us by the Roaring Sea is on the shortlist for the 2023 Ursula K. Le Guin Prize.

== Works ==
- Kumarasamy, Akil (April 21, 2015). "At the Birthplace of Sound". Boston Review.
- Kumarasamy, Akil (Summer 2017). "The Butcher". American Short Fiction. 20 (65).
- Kumarasamy, Akil (August 2017). "New World". Harper's Magazine.
- Kumarasamy, Akil (July 5, 2018). "The Office of Missing Persons". Literary Hub.
- Kumarasamy, Akil (2018). Half Gods. Farrar, Straus and Giroux. ISBN 978-0374167677
- Kumarasamy, Akil (2022). Meet Us by the Roaring Sea. Farrar, Straus and Giroux. ISBN 978-0-374-17770-6

== Honors and awards ==
- 2018 The Story Prize Spotlight Award (Half Gods)
- 2019 finalist for the PEN/Robert W Bingham Prize for Debut Short Story Collection (Half Gods)
- 2021–2022 Annual Bard Fiction Prize (Half Gods)
- 2023 Ursula K. Le Guin Prize Shortlist (Meet Us by the Roaring Sea)
