= Some Desperate Glory (novel) =

Science fiction by Emily Tesh

- Author: Emily Tesh
- Language: English
- Genre: Science fiction
- Publisher: Tordotcom
- Publication date: April 2023
- Media type: Print
- Pages: 448
- Awards: Hugo Award for Best Novel 2024
- ISBN: 9781250834980
- OCLC: 1354772707
- Dewey Decimal: 823/.92
- LC Class: PR6120.E84 S66 2023

Some Desperate Glory is a 2023 science fiction novel by Emily Tesh. It is the author's first full-length novel, following her Greenhollow Duology series of novellas. It follows Kyr, an elite human soldier who was raised in a human outpost, set on avenging a destroyed Earth, and her discovery that the truth behind Earth’s destruction is very different from the one she was indoctrinated to believe.

The novel received critical acclaim; it won the 2024 Hugo Award for Best Novel. It was also a finalist for the 2024 Locus Award for Best First Novel, and it was shortlisted for the Arthur C. Clarke Award and Ursula K. Le Guin Prize.

== Plot summary ==
Decades ago, Earth was destroyed and fourteen billion humans died during the Majo War. The majo are a group of several alien species. Most surviving humans integrate into majo society, but a few humans survive on the separatist Gaea Station.

Valkyr “Kyr” is a human living on Gaea, which is ruled by Commander Aulus Jole. Adults on Gaea are assigned to either combat, workforce, or breeding roles. Despite her top scores in combat, Kyr is assigned to Nursery, where she is expected to produce future warriors. Her twin brother Magnus is assigned to combat, but he refuses his assignment and leaves the station. She and Magnus’s friend Avi hack into Command’s files. They find that Magnus has actually been assigned a secret suicide mission.

The majo are led by a supercomputer known as the Wisdom. The Wisdom decides what is in the best interests of the majo, directing their society. It is so powerful that it can warp reality itself. The planet Chrysothemis will soon activate its Wisdom Node, integrating it into the Wisdom network. Magnus has been assigned to attack Chrysothemis during this event. Kyr, Avi, and a majo prisoner named Yiso escape Gaea and reach Chrysothemis. She reunites with her older sister Ursa, who fled Gaea after being raped and impregnated by Jole. Ursa tries to convince Kyr to enter a de-radicalization program, but Kyr runs away, planning to destroy the Wisdom Node herself.

She reaches the node and is met by Avi, Magnus, and Yiso. Avi decides that instead of destroying the Wisdom Node, they will use its powers to win the war for humanity. Avi takes control of the Wisdom and uses it to destroy millions of planets as revenge for the destruction of Earth. Kyr tries to stop him, but fails. Magnus commits suicide. Distraught, Kyr kills Avi.

The Wisdom speaks to Kyr and sends her back in time to Doomsday, when the majo destroyed Earth. Kyr saves Earth and causes humans to win the Majo War.

In this new reality, a woman named Val has a brother named Max. Val is a member of the Terran Expeditionary Force, while her brother is working with a pro-majo insurgency. In this reality, Yiso finds Val and uses the Wisdom to share Kyr’s memories with her. The combined Val-Kyr personality then has the memories from both lives. Yiso tells Valkyr that in this new reality, Jole personally took control of the Wisdom after the Majo War. Valkyr, Max, and Yiso decide to confront Jole and destroy the Wisdom. Yiso sets the Wisdom to destroy itself. Enraged, Jole uses the power of the dying Wisdom to destroy thousands of majo-inhabited worlds. The Wisdom speaks to Valkyr and sends her back to the original timeline once again.

Kyr arrives in the original timeline just before she would have been assigned to Nursery. The Wisdom destroys itself, rocking the majo civilization and upending Jole’s plans. Jole assigns Kyr to Command and begins preparing to invade Chrysothemis. Kyr and a group of conspirators including Magnus, Avi, and Yiso plan to steal a dreadnought and free all of Gaea’s women and children.

Jole grooms Kyr to replace Ursa. He attempts to kiss her, but she rejects him. Kyr and the remaining conspirators fake an attack on Gaea station. They usher all of Gaea’s women and children to safety and take control of Jole’s ship. Jole takes Yiso and flees. Avi rigs the entire station to explode; he urges Kyr to abandon Yiso and Gaea’s adult soldiers in order to escape. Kyr manages to rescue Yiso and kill Jole before the station explodes. Kyr and Yiso escape on Yiso’s ship, watching the destruction of Gaea Station together.

== Reception ==
According to Lisa Tuttle, writing for The Guardian: "The well-told story combines thrilling action with more thoughtful content, touching on such hot topics as AI, fascism and gender politics, and looks like another award winner." A starred review in Publishers Weekly concluded: "The political theme of breaking away from fascist ideology pairs beautifully with smart sci-fi worldbuilding ... and queer coming of age."

In the Washington Post, Charlie Jane Anders wrote, "the story blends thrilling action with a mind-bending course in cosmic metaphysics, which keep shifting your sense of what this book is about." Leah von Essen of Booklist compared the themes surrounding the main character Kyr to those of the television show She-Ra and the Princesses of Power. Of Kyr, she wrote: "Her growth is what powers this expansive story with an action-packed pace full of exciting battles and gut-wrenching twists." For Tor.com, Maya Gittelman called the book "an impressively mature and nuanced novel, a breathtaking puzzle box that hits hard and pulls no punches."

Year	Award	Category	Result	Ref
2024	Arthur C. Clarke Award	—	Shortlisted	
2024	Hugo Award	Novel	Won	
2024	Locus Award	First Novel	Finalist	
2024	Ursula K. Le Guin Prize	—	Shortlisted	
2026	Seiun Award	Translated Novel	Finalist	
