= How High We Go in the Dark =

2022 novel by Sequoia Nagamatsu

- Author: Sequoia Nagamatsu
- Language: English
- Genre: Literary fiction; science fiction
- Published: January 18, 2022
- Publisher: William Morrow and Company
- Publication place: United States
- Pages: 304 (Hardcover)
- ISBN: 9780063072640

How High We Go in the Dark by Sequoia Nagamatsu is a literary science fiction-fantasy novel published on January 18, 2022 by William Morrow. Bloomsbury acquired UK and Commonwealth foreign rights. The novel is told in a series of interlinked stories which take place after a pandemic massively reshapes life on earth, often focusing on grief and its intersection with technology.

== Plot summary ==
The book's plot focuses on the effects on environmental catastrophe and the sudden release of a novel virus on Planet Earth. The novel virus, which is called the Arctic Plague, reaches San Francisco on July 4, 2031. The plague is so prevalent that funerary cryptocurrency has become the common currency. The funeral industry becomes dominant and eclipses the banking industry. In the 2024s, humanity recovers extraterrestrial technology from a crash, and later, at Area 51, a human-built starship is built and powered by a stable micro black hole. Around 2039, a cure to the Arctic plague is found, and "a nationwide climate campaign to phase out gas vehicles" happens. After 30 years of the Great Transition of 2070, the City of Tokyo is an inhabited archipelago. By 2110, funerary towers, which are repurposed skyscrapers to hold and honor the dead, dominate the skyline of major cities. Around 8037, the starship crew starts to settle an exoplanet. The last message from Earth was in 7037 "when humanity constructed a Dyson sphere around the sun, fueling metropolis on Mars, Luna, and Titan".

== Reception and awards ==
Prior to publication, the book was named on "most anticipated" lists from Bustle, The Chicago Review of Books, The Guardian, The Philadelphia Inquirer, Star Tribune, and Tor.com.

Luke Gorham of Library Journal gave the novel a starred review, writing that the format "reflects the best of what short fiction can accomplish" while praising the author's ability to link the stories into a broader narrative. Gorham wrote that the novel is undeniably bleak, but that the author "resists nihilism, consistently finding beauty and meaning in the darkness, even at the end of the world." The review concluded by calling the book "essential", noting that it is a "frightening, moving work about what it means to be human while staring down our own extinction." In another starred review, Kristine Huntley of Booklist called the novel "both epic and deeply intimate ... science fiction at its finest." Huntley also praised the "gorgeous, evocative prose."

Chris Kluwe of Lightspeed called the book "innately, essentially human in a way few writers manage to capture." Kluwe praised the scientific background of the novel, praising the way that Nagamatsu dealt with climate change and the ways in which society adapts to environmental changes. Kluwe noted that Nagamatsu's worldbuilding is subtle, calling it "a natural part of the world that the characters live in, accepted because they are not titans of industry or political masters, but simply people trying to survive and grab some happiness amidst the sorrow."

Amy Brady with the Scientific American stated that "this polyphonic novel reflects our human desire to find meaning within tragedy. To feel our innate interconnection with all things, to care for one another—strangers, even—during times of immense loss, to learn how to say goodbye, to make things of beauty, and, most essentially, to inhabit and tend a livable planet for all."

A review in Publishers Weekly called the book an "ambitious, mournful debut", commenting upon the mosaic nature of the novel and the mixture of literary and science fiction elements. The review stated that "Nagamatsu can clearly write, but this exploration of global trauma makes for particularly bleak reading: the novel offers no resolutions, or even much hope, just snapshots of grief and loss... Readers willing to speculate about a global crisis not too far off from reality will find plenty to think about in this deeply sad but well-rendered vision of an apocalyptic future."

Kirkus criticized the loosely connected stories, finding some aspects repetitive and writing that "[c]obbling these stories together makes a novel-length book, but it doesn’t necessarily make a satisfying novel." The review concluded that the book was "[a]mbitious, bleak, and not fully realized."

Since publication, the novel has been cited as a New York Times Editors' Choice and has consistently been listed in "best of 2022 thus far" lists in several media outlets including Esquire, Business Insider, and Polygon, among others. The author and cultural critic, Roxane Gay, selected the novel for her Audacious Literati Book Club in March 2022. Gay said of the novel: “How High We Go in the Dark” is ambitious and intricately plotted. It is a beautiful meditation on the way everything in this world—no, in this universe—is intimately connected."

Year	Award	Category	Result	Ref.
2022	Barnes & Noble Discover Prize	—	Shortlisted	
2022	Ursula K. Le Guin Prize	—	Finalist - Top 3	
2022	Waterstones Debut Fiction Prize	—	Shortlisted	
2023	Andrew Carnegie Medal	Fiction	Longlisted	
2023	Locus Award	First Novel	Finalist	
2023	PEN Awards	PEN/Hemingway Award for Debut Novel	Longlisted	
2025	Kelvin 505 Award	Best Translated Novel (Spanish)	Won	
2025	42 Award	Best Translated Work (Spanish)	Won	
