= It Lasts Forever and Then It's Over =

2024 book by Anne de Marcken

- Cover art for the American edition published by New Directions
- Author: Anne de Marcken
- Language: English
- Publisher: New Directions Publishing (USA); Fitzcarraldo Editions (UK); Giramondo Publishing (Australia)
- Publication date: 5 March 2024
- Publication place: United States
- Awards: 2024 Ursula K. Le Guin Prize
- ISBN: 9781804270745

It Lasts Forever and Then It's Over is a 2024 book (Note: Reviewers have variously described the book as a short novel and a novella.) by Anna de Marcken. The book combines elements of literary fiction, post-apocalyptic fiction, and experimental literature. It tells the story of an unnamed zombie narrator who has lost most of her memories. The book received critical praise for its thematic exploration of identity, memory, grief, and hunger.

It Lasts Forever and Then It's Over won the 2024 Ursula K. Le Guin Prize.

== Plot ==
The novel's narrator is a zombie living in a hotel after the apocalypse. She can remember some of her life, but not her name. (Note: She occasionally uses the name Genevieve to refer to herself, which is a name that she once gave herself during French class. However, she is certain that Genevieve is not her original name.) She is slowly disintegrating; at the start of the novel, her left arm falls off. The narrator tells her story to an unspecified "you", a lover whose name she has also forgotten.

Other hotel guests suffer similar maladies. They often sit together and discuss their remaining memories. The narrator kills and eats a man. On the way back to the hotel, she finds a dead crow in the street and takes it with her. She carves a space beneath her ribs and places the crow inside her chest cavity.

A zombie named Mitchem begins preaching and starts a new religious movement. The narrator attends a meeting, but she is skeptical of his claims. The narrator discusses with her friend Marguerite, who consistently states that "none of this is real" or that "some of this is real."

The narrator stalks and kills a teenager. The crow in her chest begins to speak to her. The crow speaks only in disjointed words, often in groups of three. Marguerite builds a pyre on the roof of the hotel. An indescribable disaster occurs, destroying the hotel. The narrator escapes.

She begins to travel west through decaying and abandoned towns. She encounters Carlos, another zombie who survived the events at the hotel. They visit a grove of poplars, a location that the narrator recalls from her life. Several other survivors congregate there; they wear Pirates jerseys and have adopted new identities based on their jersey numbers. Inside a gazebo, the narrator finds a deep hole. She drops all of her clothing in, piece by piece. She removes the crow from her chest cavity and drops it into the hole as well.

She recalls picking blueberries with her lover. Afterwards, they went to the beach and observed the migration of birds. She vomits profusely; after this, her hunger vanishes. She meets Marguerite, who gives her a new set of clothing. Marguerite also gives her a quartz stone, the same stone that was one given to her by her lover on the day of the beach trip. The narrator places the stone in her cheek.

The narrator walks toward the beach. On her journey, she sees an old woman with one arm. The woman speaks to a child who is confined within a shack. The woman allows the child to eat part of her arm. The narrator runs away.

She comes upon a settlement of the living. The humans ensnare the narrator in a large net. The survivors have nailed dozens of decapitated bodies to crosses. Some of the bodies are zombies, but some are lifeless. The narrator wonders if they are dead humans or zombies who have lost the quality of being undead. The survivors decapitate the narrator and hang her on a cross.

Time passes; the narrator becomes accustomed to her new state of existence. The one-armed woman approaches the settlement and speaks to one of the crucified zombies. The narrator warns the woman that humans are approaching, helping her to escape unnoticed. Many days later, the old woman returns to speak to the narrator. The narrator states that she is trying to get to the ocean. The old woman rescues the narrator and they leave together. The old woman tells the narrator that the zombie child in the shed is her grandson. The narrator tells the old woman about the poplar grove and the other zombies there. They part ways, with the narrator carrying her own head on a walking stick.

The narrator eventually reaches the sea. She leaves her head staked on the sand. Her body walks into the ocean and floats away. Weeks later, a crow appears. She offers it the quartz stone. The crow flies away with the stone. The narrator, separated into two halves, concludes that the space between herself is "you."

== Major themes ==
Literary criticism and the nature of being

Dan Hartland wrote for Ancillary Review of Books about the concept of literary value, which is inherently subjective. Hartland wrote that literary awards may get the concept of success wrong, but that they often look past commercial success to speak to something deeper about a work.

Hartland specifically commented on the purpose of the Ursula K. Le Guin Prize, which seeks to honor "realists of a larger reality, who can imagine real grounds for hope and see alternatives to how we live now." A surface-level examination of It Lasts Forever... makes it difficult to perceive the novel is hopeful. The narrator has lost everything, including her name. When the narrator places a crow in her chest, the novel shows that previously impossible events are now possible; in other words, it expands the meaning of possibility. The novel becomes interested "in ways of being amid radically different—even unimaginably awful—circumstances." Eventually, the nature of "being" becomes a central theme of the novel. Hartland goes on to describe the book as an existential novel. By the end of the novel, the narrator has been beheaded and separated from her body. Despite this, "she also achieves a broader perspective on existence writ large." Thus, the novel fulfills the Le Guin Prize's criteria for a good novel.

Hartland also discusses the merit of literary criticism which is often seen as even more subjective than literary awards. Hartland believes that we are in "dire need of more critical reading." He examines the book Criticism and Truth by John Kramnick, in which Kramnick argues that criticism is able to offer objective analysis of a work's quality, not mere subjective opinion. Hartland uses Kramnick's ideas regarding close reading to examine It Lasts Forever... Hartland notes that the novel initially resists the use of metaphorical language, before expanding to a novel in which zombies serve as a stand-in for grief and loss. Hartland concludes that literary critical techniques prove that the novel is a quality work of art: "a grapple with the thisness of things—and an unusually limpid, balanced, plangent one at that."

Grief and hunger

In an interview with Cameron Saltsman of BOMB, the author discussed the novel's thematic content. De Marcken believes that our preoccupation with zombies reflects a particular cultural reflection of grief. The author commented on her time working at a bird sanctuary, in which she helped to heal birds which eventually returned to the wild. This influenced her own experiences with loss and is reflected in the crow within the novel.

In an interview with Christina Orlando of Reactor, de Marcken further elaborated on the connection between zombies, hunger, and grief. The author became preoccupied with the question of why an undead creature, which does not truly need to eat, would be motivated by hunger. Hunger, to the author, seemed to be an expression of rage. She was inspired by the works of Judith Butler and Anne Carson. In part, Carson wrote that one may be full of rage as a result of being full of grief.

Names and identity

The zombie characters have lost their names. Early in the book, the narrator adopts the name Genevieve, but admits that it is "the kind of name you pick for French class." Other characters adopt names as "little prayers", while the character Mitchem uses religious language to try to find words to describe their new world.

Nina Culley of Sydney Review of Books wrote that traditional literary narrators, who relate their tales with the first-person pronoun "I", are meant to be tied to specific identities. De Marcken explores what happens when a narrator is intentionally severed from "their body, their past, their self". Despite the fact that the first sentence contains the word "I", the narrator quickly reveals that she lacks "key markers of identity" such as a name.

In an interview with Cameron Saltsman, de Marcken stated that "On the one hand, names are a ridiculous form of ersatz identity. On the other hand, they have tender significance." Because the narrator does not want to misremember her dead lover's name, she addresses her as "you." This second-person address brings the reader into the position of the lover, granting the reader a place within the story.

American fiction

John Domini categorized the book as an example of American fiction, noting that it "relies so constantly, so creatively, on TV and the movies." The narrator and her lover embody a fear and loathing that relate to other examples within American fiction. Domini called them "unsettled outsiders" which "embody an American Dream tumbling into nightmare." Later in the novel, the narrator confronts a group of human survivors. This scene evokes a standoff from a Spaghetti Western film.

== Style ==
The book is written in present tense. It utilizes second person narration, addressing the readers as "indeterminate figures ... filled with the memories of someone else". The paragraphs are separated by empty spaces of varying sizes.

It is divided into seven parts, each beginning with an epigraph. The epigraphs are selected from writers including Hélène Cixous and Charles Simic. The novel also contains three illustrations: "a dashed line, an 'unruly' spiral, and an axonometric cube". These drawings were created by the author to help "conceptualise the novel's shape."

John Domini wrote that the novel's opening line intentionally echoes the opening of L'Etranger ("The Stranger") by Albert Camus. The Stranger bluntly opens by stating that "Aujourd'hui, maman est mort." ("Mother died today.") The first words of de Marcken's novel are: "I lost my left arm today."

== Reception and awards ==
Kate Simpson of The Daily Telegraph gave the novel five stars, calling it "darkly comic and metaphysical." Simpson noted that our culture is obsessed with neat endings in stories, despite the fact that the real world does not have simple conclusions. It Lasts Forever and Then It's Over reflects the real world by resisting the trope of the happy ending.

Elaine Chennatt of Aniko Press praised the novel for its unique take on the trope of zombies. Chennatt felt that the novel was one of her favorite reads of the year, writing that the author "transcends the confines of traditional storytelling". The reviewer wrote that one of the novel's greatest strengths is its exploration of the theme of connection. Chennatt concluded that the novel "is a gorgeous, masterful meditation on the passage of time, the enduring power of memory and the fundamental questions of human existence..."

Writing for The Brooklyn Rail, John Domini praised the book's literary bona fides, stating that "it's hard to imagine a more erudite zombie story." Domini wrote that de Marcken triumphs by taking zombie novel tropes and transforming them into a "philosophical odyssey." The review criticized some of the novel's dialogue. Initially, the reviewer felt the same way about the talking crow, but concluded that it eventually struck "a fine balance between Disney's Song of the South and Carl Orff's 'O Fortuna.'"

The novel received the 2024 Ursula K. Le Guin Prize for Fiction. It also received a 2025 Pacific Northwest Book Award and won the 2025 VCU Cabell First Novelist Award. In 2022, it was co-winner of The Novel Prize with Jonathan Buckley's Tell.
