= Simon Jimenez =

Filipino-American author of speculative fiction novels

- Born: 1989 (age 36–37)
- Education: Emerson College (MFA)
- Occupation: Author
- Writing career
- Language: English
- Genre: Speculative fiction
- Notable awards: Crawford Award (2023)
- Website: www.simonjimenezwriter.com

Simon Emmanuel Jimenez is a Filipino-American writer of speculative fiction. His novels include The Vanished Birds and The Spear Cuts Through Water. Jimenez's works have received critical praise. The Vanished Birds was a finalist for the 2021 Locus Award for Best First Novel and the 2021 Arthur C. Clarke Award.

Jimenez was nominated for the 2021 Astounding Award for Best New Writer.

== Early life and education ==
Jimenez spent time in Canada and the Philippines growing up. He attended Emerson College, where he earned an MFA in Creative Writing. Jimenez played the piano, and describes it as a "love/hate relationship".

== Career ==
In an interview with Kirkus, Jimenez described himself as a "lifelong science fiction fan". Among his influences are the science fiction works Hyperion Cantos by Dan Simmons, as well as the works of David Mitchell, Gabriel García Marquez, and Jennifer Egan.

During his time at Emerson College, he began working on his first novel. His debut novel, The Vanished Birds, was published in 2020 from Titan Books. In 2021, Jimenez was nominated for the Astounding Award for Best New Writer.

His second novel, The Spear Cuts Through Water, was published by Del Rey Books in 2022. The book received a starred review from Kirkus Reviews. It won a 2023 British Fantasy Award and 2023 Crawford Award.

"It’s both like nothing and everything you’ve ever read: a tale made from the threads that weave the world, and all of us, together. Lyrical, evocative, part poem, part prose—not to be missed by anyone, especially fans of historical fantasy and folktale." — Kirkus Reviews, starred review of The Spear Cuts Through Water

== Personal life ==
Jimenez is gay and multiracial, being half Filipino. He currently lives in Philadelphia, Pennsylvania, in the United States.

== Awards and honors ==
In 2022, Kirkus Reviews named The Spear Cuts Through Water one of the best science fiction and fantasy books of the year.

Year	Work	Award	Category	Result	Ref
2020	The Vanished Birds	Goodreads Choice Awards	Science Fiction	Finalist	
2021	The Vanished Birds	Arthur C. Clarke Award	—	Shortlisted	
2021	The Vanished Birds	British Fantasy Award	Best Newcomer (Sydney J. Bounds Award)	Shortlisted	
2021	The Vanished Birds	Locus Award	First Novel	Finalist	
2021	—	Astounding Award	—	Finalist	
2023	The Spear Cuts Through Water	British Fantasy Award	Fantasy Novel (Robert Holdstock Award)	Won	
2023	The Spear Cuts Through Water	Crawford Award	—	Won	
2023	The Spear Cuts Through Water	Ignyte Award	Adult Novel	Finalist	
2023	The Spear Cuts Through Water	Ursula K. Le Guin Prize	—	Shortlisted	
2024	The Spear Cuts Through Water	Grand prix de l'Imaginaire	Roman étranger	Shortlisted	
2024	The Spear Cuts Through Water	Prix Imaginales	Meilleur roman étranger	Shortlisted	

== Bibliography ==
- —— (2020). The Vanished Birds. Titan Books. ISBN 9780593128985.
- —— (2022). The Spear Cuts Through Water. Del Rey Books. ISBN 9780593156599.
