= The Saint of Bright Doors =

2023 fantasy novel by Vajra Chandrasekera

- Author: Vajra Chandrasekera
- Language: English
- Genres: Fantasy
- Publisher: Tor Books
- Publication date: 11 July 2023
- Publication place: Sri Lanka
- ISBN: 9781250847386

The Saint of Bright Doors is the 2023 debut fantasy novel by Sri Lankan author Vajra Chandrasekera. The novel follows the story of a man trained from a young age to assassinate a prominent spiritual leader, in a fictional city with supernatural "bright doors".

The novel won the 2023 Nebula Award for Best Novel, 2024 Crawford Award, 2024 Ignyte Award for Best Adult Novel, and 2024 Locus Award for Best First Novel. It was a finalist for several other literary prizes, including the Hugo Award for Best Novel. It was listed as a New York Times Notable Book, Editors’ Pick, and Best Fantasy of 2023.

== Plot ==
In a world where modern technology coexists with supernatural forces, Fetter is the son of a zealot known as Mother-of-Glory and an absent, godlike figure called the Perfect and Kind. The Perfect and Kind is a messianic figure and cult leader who abandoned Fetter before birth. Fetter, uniquely able to see invisible creatures called “devils,” is raised in the village of Acusdab and is trained by his mother in magic and assassination. During his childhood, Mother-of-Glory cuts away Fetter's shadow in order to give him the power of flight and make him a better killer. Her goal is for Fetter to one day kill his father and dismantle the Paths, which are his father's organized religious followers.

As an adult, Fetter rejects his upbringing and flees to the city of Luriat, a metropolis filled with inexplicable, vividly painted doors that only exist on one side and cannot be opened. He joins a support group for survivors of religious cults led by the fierce and pragmatic Koel. He also begins dating a man named Hej and works as a guide for newly arrived refugees. He meets Caduv, a man whose voice carries magical power, and brings him to Koel's support group.

Koel recruits Fetter and Caduv into her anti-government activist group. Fetter is given the false identity of Peroe, a middle-caste student. Fetter infiltrates the bureaucracies that guard the bright doors. He begins working with Pipra, a government scientist studying how new bright doors appear.

Meanwhile, Fetter’s dying mother reaches out to him. She recounts her childhood on an island where magic flowed freely and devils lived openly among humans. That life was erased when a charismatic pirate, who would become the Perfect and Kind, learned her people’s magic. The Perfect and Kind used his newly learned magic to reshape the past. This “cataclysm” caused the island to vanish from memory, devils to become invisible, and the city of Luriat to come into being.

Fetter witnesses a devil emerge from one of the bright doors and realizes they are not truly sealed. Devils can travel through the bright doors to enter the physical world. As his investigation deepens, he uncovers the existence of an object called Relic a. This relic could be used to kill the Perfect and Kind if it enters close proximity to him. Fetter steals the relic from Pipra and heads south to Acusdab. He hopes to intercept his father as the Perfect and Kind journeys to Luriat for religious purposes.

Fetter visits Mother-of-Glory, who is dying of cancer. He believes that he has gotten close enough to kill the Perfect and Kind. Before she dies, Mother-of-Glory reveals that the Perfect and Kind has altered reality to ensure his own survival. With his plan foiled, Fetter returns to Luriat. He is placed in a prison camp, where he becomes trapped in its layers of bureaucracy. Eventually, he reinvents himself as a prison witch-doctor and exorcises a devil from another inmate.

Fetter is brought back to Luriat by the Perfect and Kind. His father offers him the title “Saint of Bright Doors” and a role in the Paths. The Perfect and Kind reveals some of the secrets of the bright doors. When the Perfect and Kind overwrites the past to change reality, the people from those overwritten realities become devils and can re-enter reality through the bright doors. Fetter declines his father's offer. Meanwhile, Luriat descends into chaos: pogroms break out, a plague spreads, and many citizens die. Fetter reunites with Koel and Caduv; he kills one of his father's Saints. Fetter also meets Ordinary, the Acusdabi ambassador and his mother’s former lover. When the Perfect and Kind’s agent arrives to arrest Fetter, Ordinary slams shut the Embassy door, creating a new bright door. A past version of Mother-of-Glory emerges, kills the agent, and escapes with Ordinary through the door.

At last, the Perfect and Kind confronts Fetter directly. He brings him to a park and claims the burned corpses of Hej, Pipra, Caduv, and Koel lie before them. (They are not truly dead.) The narrative shifts to Fetter’s shadow, the Unfettered, who has served as a hidden first-person narrator throughout the story. The Perfect and Kind brings Fetter outside of time, unintentionally severing the connection between Fetter and his shadow. The Unfettered secretly possesses one of the Perfect and Kind’s followers, then transfers into the Perfect and Kind himself, killing him. In the aftermath, the Unfettered watches as Fetter, Koel, and Caduv continue their revolution before quietly leaving them behind.

== Themes ==
Aigner Loren Wilson at Lightspeed identified themes of "generational, religious, and political trauma" in the novel. Sally Adee at New Scientist described the "deepest theme" of the novel as "the nature of memory and how it can be abused."

In a Literary Hub podcast, Chandrasekera described the novel as "very much a book about history and the way histories are formed, structured, organized, and recorded," adding that there was a "blurring of history and mythology" which can be "highly politically significant depending on whose mythology is being forced onto who."

== Reception and awards ==
Amal El-Mohtar for The New York Times called the novel "the best book I’ve read all year," saying that it was a "casual challenge to what a fantasy novel could be" and "manages to pinpoint the peculiar insanity of our modernity." Jake Casella Brookins at Locus said that the book was "a hard book to talk about... There is so much going on here, and yet it all fits together perfectly – book of the year material, no question," adding that it "deploys some truly huge ideas in how it plays with the writing and rewriting of history and culture" and that had a striking "commitment to the revolutionary impulse and societal critique."

Aigner Loren Wilson at Lightspeed described the book as "a slow beautiful burn of wonderful city descriptions and magical mysteries" that wasn't "as dark as I was expecting." Publishers Weekly called it "a lyrical but sluggish fantasy," saying that it was a "meandering meditation on mind-body duality, fanaticism, and eschatology that will appeal only to fans of the most cerebral fantasies."

Year	Award	Category	Result	Ref.
2023	BSFA Award	Novel	Longlisted	
2023	Nebula Award	Novel	Won	
2024	British Fantasy Awards	Sydney J. Bounds Award for Best Newcomer	Shortlisted	
2024	Crawford Award	—	Won	
2024	Dragon Award	Science Fiction Novel	Nominee	
2024	Hugo Award	Novel	Finalist	
2024	Ignyte Award	Adult Novel	Won	
2024	Lambda Literary Award	Speculative Fiction	Finalist	
2024	Locus Award	First Novel	Won	
2024	Ursula K. Le Guin Prize	—	Shortlisted	
