= Sequoia Nagamatsu =

American writer

- Education: Pinewood School, Los Altos; Grinnell College (BA); Southern Illinois University-Carbondale (MFA)
- Occupations: Novelist; short story writer; professor
- Spouse: Cole Nagamatsu
- Writing career
- Genre: speculative fiction
- Notable work: How High We Go in the Dark (2022)
- Website: www.sequoianagamatsu.com

Sequoia Nagamatsu is an American novelist, short story writer, and professor. He is the author of the novel How High We Go in the Dark and the award-winning short story collection Where We Go When All We Were Is Gone.

== Early life and education ==
Nagamatsu is originally from Oahu, Hawaii and the San Francisco Bay Area. He attended Pinewood School, a private high school in Los Altos Hills, where he began his love of creative writing. He received a Bachelor of Arts in Anthropology from Grinnell College in 2004. He later received a Master of Fine Arts in Creative Writing from Southern Illinois University-Carbondale.

== Career ==
Nagamatsu was formerly the managing editor of Psychopomp Magazine alongside his wife, Cole Nagamatsu.

His work has appeared in such publications as Conjunctions, The Southern Review, ZYZZYVA, The Bellevue Literary Review, Black Warrior Review, The Fairy Tale Review, The Iowa Review, Lightspeed Magazine, and Tin House.

He previously taught at the College of Idaho, Southern Illinois University, and the Martha's Vineyard Institute of Creative Writing. Nagamatsu is currently an associate professor of English at St. Olaf College, where he teaches first-year writing and creative writing courses. He also teaches for the Rainier Writers Workshop Low-Residency MFA Program at Pacific Lutheran University located in Tacoma, Washington.

His short story collection, Where We Go When All We Were Is Gone, was published by Black Lawrence Press in May 2016. The collection received positive reviews from Booklist, BuzzFeed, Strange Horizons, The Rumpus, and Green Mountains Review.

The collection received the following accolades:

- Foreword Reviews Indie Book of the Year Silver Medal winner: Short Stories (Adult Fiction) (2016)
- Foreword Reviews Indie Book of the Year finalist: Multicultural (Adult Fiction) (2016)
- Entropy Magazine Best Books of 2016

Nagamatsu's debut novel, How High We Go in the Dark, was published in 2022 by William Morrow. The novel became a National Bestseller and a New York Times Editors’ Choice. It was longlisted for the 2023 Andrew Carnegie Medal, and was a finalist for the 2022 Ursula K. Le Guin Prize and the 2023 Locus Award for First Novel.

== Personal life ==
He currently lives in Minneapolis, Minnesota with his wife, Cole Nagamatsu, their cat, Kalahira, a dog Fenris, and a Sony Aibo robotic dog named Calvino.

Nagamatsu has Japanese roots and lived in Niigata City, Japan for about two years prior to attending graduate school.

== Publications ==
=== Collections ===
- Where We Go When All We Were Is Gone. Black Lawrence Press. 2016. ISBN 9781625571366.

=== Novels ===
- How High We Go in the Dark. William Morrow. 2022. ISBN 9780063072640.

=== Selected short stories ===
- "Grave Friends," published Fall 2020 in The Iowa Review
- "Elegy Hotel," published Spring 2020 in The Southern Review
- "The Songs of Your Decay," published April 27, 2016 by Day One
- "Where We Go When All We Were is Gone," published May 15, 2015 in Green Mountain Reviews
- "The Return to Monsterland," published in Conjunctions, then reprinted September 3, 2015 in Joyland
- "Headwater LLC," published December 31st 2014 in Lightspeed, then republished July 26, 2016 in The Museum of All Things Awesome and that Go Boom
- "Placentophagy," published November 21, 2014 in Tin House
- "Melancholy Nights in a Tokyo Cyber Cafe," published May 1, 2009 in One World: A Global Anthology of Short Stories
