= Hiron Ennes =

American science fiction and horror writer

- Occupations: novelist; short story writer; musician; pathologist
- Writing career
- Language: English
- Period: 2022–present
- Genres: gothic fiction; science fiction; horror fiction; post-apocalyptic fiction
- Notable works: Leech (2022); The Works of Vermin (2025)
- Notable awards: British Fantasy Award (2023)
- Website: hironennes.com

Hiron Ennes is an American writer, musician, and pathologist.

== Early life and education ==
Ennes wrote constantly as a child, writing Dune fanfiction then later dystopias in high school and poetry in college. "All through childhood I’d fill my school notebooks with fantasy inspired by Diana Wynne Jones. When I was 10 or 11, my grandfather gave me his old office typewriter, on which I clicked away nonstop…"

Ennes studied physics for their undergraduate degree. Between college and medical school, they lived in the basement of a Virginia Woolf professor who encouraged them to take a creative writing course. In a 2024 interview with Vox Vomitus podcast, Ennes confirmed that they had completed their medical degree and work as a pathologist.

== Career ==
=== Writing career ===
Ennes began their first novel, Leech, in an online novel-writing course. It was published in 2022 by Tor Books as part of a two-book deal. In a starred review from Publishers Weekly, Leech was described as "Emotionally complex, wildly inventive, and full of squirming terror". The novel won the 2023 British Fantasy Award for Best Newcomer.

Their second novel, The Works of Vermin, was published by Tor in 2025. It was shortlisted for the 2026 Ursula K. Le Guin Prize. Tobias Carroll at Reactor wrote that the novel "rarely goes where you’d expect. I went in expecting strange creatures and thrilling adventure, and I got both. But Ennes’s book also contains moving scenes of interpersonal interaction and an unsettling lesson in the abuses of power. It’s a haunting read, but not necessarily for the reasons you’d expect."

=== Pathologist career ===
Ennes's areas of medical interest include infectious disease, pathology, and anti-capitalist healthcare reform. As of December 2025, Ennes works as a pathologist and plans to move into forensic pathology.

== Writing style and influences ==
Leech has been described as "a combination of Gothic horror and science fiction" and by Ennes themselves as "post-post-apocalyptic soft-sci-fi gothic body horror". Ennes's literary influences include Diana Wynne Jones and Dune from childhood; the horror settings of Gormenghast, Dracula, Frankenstein, and The Phantom of the Opera; novelists Samuel R. Delany, China Miéville, Sofia Samatar, and José Donoso; and the French-language writers Blaise Cendrars, Comte de Lautréamont, and Henri Barbusse.

== Personal life ==
Ennes plays the harp and is very fond of dogs. They consider themself to be "queer in every sense of the word" and use they/them pronouns.

== Awards ==
Work	Year & Award	Category	Result	Ref.
Leech	2023 British Fantasy Award	Newcomer	Won	
Leech	2023 Endeavour Award	Distinguished Novel or Collection	Finalist	
"Our Best Selves"	2025 World Fantasy Award	Short Fiction	Nominated	
The Works of Vermin	2026 Aldiss Award	—	Longlisted	
The Works of Vermin	2026 Sunburst Award	—	Finalist	
The Works of Vermin	2026 Ursula K. Le Guin Prize	—	Finalist	

== Partial bibliography ==
=== Novels ===
- Leech (Tor, 2022)
- The Works of Vermin (Tor, 2025)

=== Short stories ===
- "Our Best Selves", Weird Horror, 2024
- "The Breath of Kannask", Northern Nights, 2024
- "Lyra, from Many Angles", Escape Pod, 2025
