= Emily Tesh =

British science fiction and fantasy author

- Occupation: Author
- Writing career
- Language: English
- Genres: Science fiction; Fantasy
- Notable work: Some Desperate Glory
- Notable awards: Astounding Award for Best New Writer (2021); Hugo Award for Best Novel (2024)

Emily Tesh is a science fiction and fantasy author. She won the 2024 Hugo Award for Best Novel for her first novel, Some Desperate Glory. She won the World Fantasy Award in the novella category in 2020, and the Astounding Award for Best New Writer in 2021.

== Biography ==
Emily Tesh grew up in London. Tesh has stated that she has written stories since she was a child.

Tesh attended Trinity College, Cambridge and the University of Chicago. She lives in Hertfordshire and is a school classics teacher.

=== Writing career ===
Tesh's first published works were the novellas Silver in the Wood and Drowned Country, in the Greenhollow Duology. Silver in the Wood is an adaptation of the Green Man English tale. Author Katharine Coldiron described it as an "utterly enchanting" tale centering queer romance and nature writing. The story won the 2020 World Fantasy Award for Best Novella.

Tesh's first novel, Some Desperate Glory, earned praise from critics and the 2024 Hugo Award for Best Novel. It is a science-fiction novel focusing on the choices that the protagonist, Kyr, must make during a devastating war after having been raised in a fascist, militaristic society. It is a queer story and subverts classic tropes from the space opera and bildungsroman genres.

Tesh's next novel, The Incandescent, was released in May 2025. It is a fantasy novel following Dr. Walden, who is Director of Magic at a British boarding school. In handling the demonic mistakes of her students and her own missteps, Dr. Walden is forced to question and confront her own self-image. Publishers Weekly gave it a starred review, describing it as a "thoughtful exploration of privilege, power, and private school education." Critic Liz Bourke described it as a brilliant novel, "that marries the energy and verve and peril of the best of the fantasy genre with the understated, literary examination of interior and professional lives".

== Awards and honors ==
Awards and honors
Year	Work	Award	Category	Result	Ref.
2020	Silver in the Wood	Astounding Award for Best New Writer	—	Finalist	
2020	Silver in the Wood	Crawford Award	—	Shortlisted	
2020	Silver in the Wood	World Fantasy Award	Novella	Won	
2021	Silver in the Wood	Astounding Award for Best New Writer	—	Won	
2024	Some Desperate Glory	Arthur C. Clarke Award	—	Shortlisted	
2024	Some Desperate Glory	Hugo Award	Novel	Won	
2024	Some Desperate Glory	Locus Award	First Novel	Finalist	
2024	Some Desperate Glory	Ursula K. Le Guin Prize	—	Shortlisted	
2025	The Incandescent	Nebula Award	Novel	Finalist	
2026	The Incandescent	Hugo Award	Novel	Finalist	
2026	The Incandescent	Locus Award	Fantasy Novel	Finalist	
2026	The Incandescent	Mythopoeic Award	Adult Literature	Finalist	
2026	Some Desperate Glory	Seiun Award	Translated Novel	Finalist	

== Selected publications ==
- Greenhollow Duology
  - Silver in the Wood, (2019, Tor: ISBN 9781250229793)
  - Drowned Country, (2020, Tor: ISBN 9781250756602)
- Some Desperate Glory, (2023, Orbit: ISBN 9780356517179)
- The Incandescent, (2025, Tor: ISBN 9781250835017)
