= Olga Ravn =

Danish poet and novelist (born 1986)

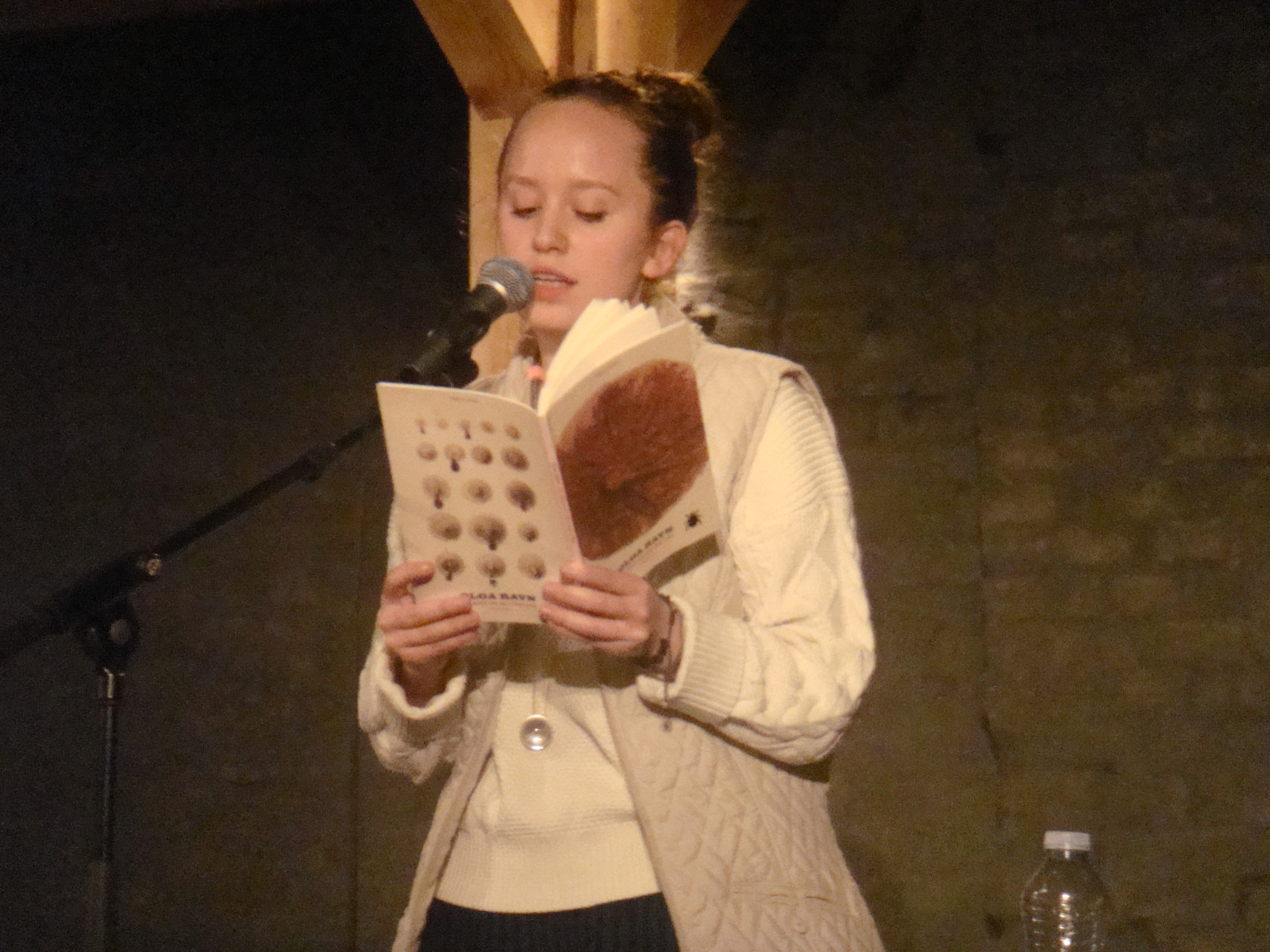
- Ravn in 2012
- Born: Olga Ravn; 27 September 1986 (age 40); Copenhagen, Denmark
- Education: Forfatterskolen
- Occupations: Poet, novelist
- Writing career
- Language: Danish
- Years active: 2008 – present
- Genres: Literary fiction; science fiction
- Website: olga-ravn.blogspot.dk

Olga Sofia Ravn (born 27 September 1986) is a Danish poet and novelist. She won Denmark's Beatrice Prize in 2019. Her novel The Employees was shortlisted for the 2021 International Booker Prize and the Ursula K. Le Guin Prize and longlisted for the International Dublin Literary Award and the translated literature category of the US National Book Award. Her novel The Wax Child was longlisted for the 2026 International Booker Prize.

She is also a translator and has worked as a literary critic for Politiken and several other Danish publications.

== Early life and education ==
Olga Ravn was born and raised in Copenhagen, the daughter of singer Anne Dorte Michelsen and visual artist and designer Peter Ravn. In 2010 she graduated from the Danish School of Authors, Forfatterskolen, in that city.

== Work ==
Praised for her playfulness, she turns words and meanings inside out. She plays around with repetitions, colours, grotesqueries and tiers this with everyday words and phrases, creating a rhythmic and pulsating reading experience which is almost physical and visceral.

— Stockholm International Poetry Festival 2015 review

Ravn published her first poem in the Copenhagen literary magazine Hvedekorn in 2008. Since then, her poetry has appeared in Konvolut 28/6, Trappe Tusind, Verbale Pupiller, Antologi 2010 and Forfatterskolens Afgangsantologi 2010. Her early poetry, described as "rhythmic, playful, sensual and image-rich", earned positive critical reception.

In 2012 Ravn published her first collection of poetry, Jeg æder mig selv som lyng (I Eat Myself Like Heather). The collection explores how young women's bodies react to friendship, sex, and love. In 2013 the collection was translated into Swedish.

In 2014 Ravn published a chapbook of poetry titled Mean Girl, consisting of coloured sheets of paper and glimmering scraps. Only 250 copies were released, each prepared with individual attention so that none were identical. Mean Girl (et utdrag), a selection of Mean Girl translated to Norwegian, was published by Flamme Forlag in 2015.

Ravn was editor on the 2015 book of Tove Ditlevsen works Jeg ville være enke, og jeg ville være digter: Glemte tekster af Tove Ditlevsen (I Wanted to Be a Widow, and I Wanted to Be a Poet: Forgotten Texts by Tove Ditlevsen).

In 2015 she published her first novel, Celestine, about a boarding school teacher's obsession with a ghost who has much in common with her. The main difference between the two, the teacher points out, is that she is not yet dead.

In 2021, Ravn published The Employees: A workplace novel of the 22nd century. The novel is set aboard a spaceship on which a number of alien objects have been brought for research. The book is made up of reports by human and android crew members about these objects and their daily lives on the ship. This novel was shortlisted for the 2021 International Booker Prize and in 2022 for the inaugural Ursula K. Le Guin Prize.

Her fourth novel, The Wax Child, was published in Danish in 2023. The English translation, by Martin Aitken, was published in 2025. Narrated by a wax doll from the seventeenth century, the novel tells the story of the doll's creator, the historical Christence Kruckow, who was executed for witchcraft in 1621. The novel was a finalist for the 2026 Locus Award for Best Translated Novel.

== Critical reception ==
In 2011, Danish Literary Magazine described Ravn's upcoming poetry collection, Jeg æder myself som lyng, as "a passionate, lyrical collection that deals with freeing oneself from the role of young girl". The book received other positive reviews from Danish critics who described it as "bursting with talent" and "ambitious and well-wrought".

On Celestine, Søren Kassebeer of Berlingske complimented the author on her use of language: "She can achieve so incredibly much with words... There seem to be no limits to her ability to create images." Nevertheless, although he found Celestine readable, he did not regard it a complete success, commenting that it constantly dwells on feelings expressed either by the narrator or the ghost, rather than simply saying what needs to be said. Lilian Munk Rösing of Politiken was particularly impressed with Ravn's use of images and metaphors, and her command of powerful, at times humorous language. Victor Malm writing in Sydsvenskan said: "The novel [resembles] Marguerite Duras and Clarice Lispector. Through an intensive rinsing stream of scenes, images and memories an empty feeling of life ahead is evoked."

In 2019, Ravn was awarded the Beatrice Prize, which recognises the quality of an author's already published work and their potential for further development.

In 2021, Ravn's novel The Employees, translated into English by Martin Aitken, was shortlisted for the International Booker Prize. The Guardian called The Employees brilliantly unusual, and said that this "clever, endlessly thought-provoking novel catches something of our recursive search for the nature of consciousness". The New York Review of Books called it a "weird, beautiful, and occasionally disgusting novel" and found that "what The Employees captures best is humanity’s ambivalence about life itself, its sticky messes and unappealing functions".

In 2026, her novel The Wax Child, translated into English by Martin Aitken, was longlisted for the 2026 International Booker Prize. The Times Literary Supplement called The Wax Child "gorgeously mercurial: fragmented, slippery, unresolved". The Chicago Review of Books noted that the treatment of witchcraft was not original, but found the novel "deeply immersive and immensely pleasurable to read", and praised "the classic, elegant gripping prose".

== Awards ==
Year	Work	Award	Category	Result	Ref
2018	The Employees	Niels Klim prisen	Kortroman	Won	
2019	—	Beatrice Prize	—	Won	
2021	The Employees	International Booker Prize	—	Shortlisted	
2021	The Employees	Warwick Prize for Women in Translation	—	Longlisted	
2021	My Work	Læsernes Bogpris	—	Nominated	
2022	The Employees	National Book Award	Translated Literature	Longlisted	
2022	The Employees	International Dublin Literary Award	—	Longlisted	
2022	The Employees	Ursula K. Le Guin Prize	—	Shortlisted	
2023	My Work	Cercador Prize for Literature in Translation	—	Finalist	
2026	The Wax Child	International Booker Prize	—	Longlisted	
2026	The Wax Child	Locus Award	Translated Novel	Finalist	

== Other activities ==
Ravn is a writing instructor at Testrup Højskole, a literary critic for Politiken, and an editor at Gyldendal.

She regularly posts short writings, videos and pictures on her blog and Tumblr account.

== Bibliography ==
=== Poetry ===
- —— (2012). Jeg æder mig selv som lyng: pigesind [I Eat Myself Like Heather] (in Danish). Gyldendal. ISBN 978-87-02-11836-0.
- —— (2014). Mean Girl (in Danish). Private.
- —— (2016). Den hvide rose (in Danish). Gyldendal.

=== Novels ===
- —— (2015). Celestine (in Danish). Gyldendal. ISBN 978-87-02-16699-6.
- De ansatte (Gyldendal, 2018). The Employees, trans. Martin Aitken (2022)
- Mit arbejde (Gyldendal, 2020). My Work, trans. Sophia Hersi Smith and Jennifer Russell (2023)
- Voksbarnet (Gyldendal, 2023). The Wax Child, trans. Martin Aitken (2025)

=== Edited work ===
- Ditlevsen, Tove (2015). Ravn, Olga (ed.). Jeg ville være enke, og jeg ville være digter: Glemte tekster af Tove Ditlevsen [I Wanted to Be a Widow, and I Wanted to Be a Poet: Forgotten Texts by Tove Ditlevsen] (in Danish). Gyldendal. ISBN 978-87-02-17283-6.

=== Selected articles ===
- "Olga Ravn: Tove, pengene og skriften" [Olga Ravn: Tove, Money and Writing]. Politiken (in Danish). 9 March 2015.
- "Sorry Mallarmé" (in Danish). Information.dk. 27 February 2014.
- "Olga Ravn: At skrive er en måde at tænke på" [Olga Ravn: Writing is a Way of Thinking]. Politiken (in Danish). 4 February 2014.
- "Nomineret: Ida Jessen" [Nominated: Ida Jessen] (in Danish). Information.dk. 14 November 2013.
- "Nomineret: Yahya Hassan" [Nominated: Yahya Hassan] (in Danish). Information.dk. 14 November 2013.
- "Jeg var Vita Andersens sætning" [I Was the Sentence of Vita Andersen] (in Danish). Information.dk. 8 November 2013.
- "Med kærlige hilsner" [Yours sincerely] (in Danish). Information.dk. 16 May 2012.
- "Om spøgelser i april" [On Ghosts in April] (in Danish). Information.dk. 13 April 2012.
- "En død mands damer" [A Dead Man's Ladies] (in Danish). Information.dk. 16 February 2012.
- "Ikke til oversættelse" [Not for Translation] (in Danish). Information.dk. 6 January 2012.
- "Jeg skriver til dem fra kysten ..." [I Write to Those from the Shore ...] (in Danish). Information.dk. 24 November 2011.

== See also ==
- List of Danish women writers
