= The Vanished Birds =

2020 space opera novel by Simon Jimenez

- Author: Simon Jimenez
- Language: English
- Genre: Space opera
- Published: 14 Jan 2020
- Publisher: Del Rey Books, Titan Books
- Pages: 391 (Hardcover)
- ISBN: 9780593128985

The Vanished Birds is a 2020 space opera novel, the debut work by Simon Jimenez. In a plot that spans millennia, the story focuses on the interconnected lives of several characters, including a boy whose special ability may hold the key to unlocking the secrets of the universe. The novel received critical acclaim. It was a finalist for the 2021 Locus Award for Best First Novel and was shortlisted for both the 2021 Arthur C. Clarke Award and the British Fantasy Award for Newcomer.

== Plot ==
About one thousand years before the main events of the story, Earth's ecology collapses. Fumiko Nakajima is a scientist who designs space stations for a massive business conglomerate called Umbai. She chooses to leave her lover Dana behind as a privileged group of humans escapes Earth.

On the resource world Umbai-V, a young boy named Kaeda meets Captain Nia Imani. Every fifteen years, her ship visits his planet. Because of time dilation, each fifteen-year period takes only a few months for Nia. Over the course of Kaeda's life, they meet sporadically. When Kaeda is an old man, a young boy appears from nowhere, surrounded by the wreckage of a ship. Months later, Kaeda passes custody of the boy to Nia. He gives the boy a flute which was originally gifted to him by Nia.

Fumiko, having lived almost a millennium with the assistance of cryogenic sleep, hires Nia to care for the child. Fumiko believes he possesses the ability to Jaunt, meaning to travel through space instantaneously and without time dilation. Nia and her crew agree to raise the boy for fifteen years outside of the knowledge of Umbai, waiting to see if his powers will manifest. Initially the boy appears mute, but he and Nia bond through music. The boy reveals that his name is Ahro. He was a slave on a generation ship crewed by musicians before a kind crew member helped him escape. Nia raises Ahro for the next four years. He eventually learns to Jaunt, returning to Umbai-V among other worlds. Fumiko's Umbai contract prohibits her from working outside the company. When her secret research base is discovered, the company murders her workers, stranding her alone and without power.

Vaila is both a pilot on Nia's ship and one of Fumiko's former lovers. She kidnaps Ahro and betrays the crew to Umbai. Ahro is tortured by Umbai scientists as they experiment on him, trying to decipher the source of his power. He is placed in a coma so he cannot Jaunt and escape from them. Eventually, they use his blood to manufacture fast travel (FT) drives.

Fumiko rigs a makeshift power source on her research base and uses it to contact Vaila. Vaila arrives at Fumiko's base expecting a reconciliation, but Fumiko murders her and steals her ship. After FT drives become commonplace, Nia brings out Ahro's flute and plays it. The music allows them to forge a psychic connection. For fifteen years, Nia travels the universe and plays her music for Ahro, but he does not wake from his coma. Eventually, she travels back to Umbai-V. As she plays a final song for Ahro, Fumiko suicidally bombs the station where Ahro is hidden. He awakens from his coma and, sensing danger, Jaunts to Umbai-V. He and Nia finally reunite.

== Major themes ==
The A.V. Club describes the book as "aggressively anti-capitalist". The book contains many examples of the rich and powerful exploiting both humanity and natural resources. A review in Strange Horizons describes the Umbai corporation as neocolonialist; it profits from the natural resources of worlds such as Umbai-V, yet prevents their inhabitants from participating fully in interstellar society. Centuries later, Umbai-V's economy and social structures are upended because of tourism. In what the A.V. Club noted was a "blunt metaphor", the Umbai company powers their FT drive with Ahro's blood.

Though Captain Imani's ship is irrelevant to the plot by the end of the novel, the ship's presence in the story is used to explore social inequality, classism, and freedom. Captain Imani's crew is free to travel the galaxy, unlike the inhabitants of Umbai-V, but they are still subject to outside demands and so are not truly "free". The restrictive nature of the space freighter gives an "on the ground" view of life in the galaxy, unlike the more expansive perspectives taken by some other space operas. The spaceship also provides an enclosed space in which the author can develop the novel's found family relationships.

Personal identity is explored in the novel, reflecting the author's identity as a gay, mixed-race man. Jimenez has stated that the feeling of being "caught between two worlds" was a direct emotional inspiration for the novel.

== Style ==
The novel has been described as musical in tone. The pacing varies dramatically from one section of the book to the next; sometimes months or years pass by, while at other times the pace slows down and several hours are explored over many pages.

The novel is divided into three sections. The first section of the novel is divided into chapters with different protagonists; they could be viewed as a work of related short stories. In the second part of the novel, the seemingly unrelated fragments are linked together by the lives of Nia Imani, Ahro, and Fumiko Nakajima. There are still changes in focus between characters; however, all of the events take place during the same timeline, unlike the events of part one. In the third and final section, the novel follows a single unified plot line.

== Publication history ==
The first chapter of the novel was originally published as a short story before being incorporated into The Vanished Birds.

== Reception ==
The novel received critical praise. Writing for Locus, Paul Di Filippo called it "not only the best debut novel I’ve read in ages, but simply one of the best SF novels in recent memory." Di Filippo praised the evocative worldbuilding and lush prose, comparing it positively to the works of Samuel R. Delany and Ursula K. Le Guin. In another review for Locus, Gary K. Wolfe called it "the most impressive debut of 2020". Kirkus Reviews called the novel "the best of what science fiction can be" and "a gorgeous debut". The review praised its exploration of human connection as well as the well-written characters. In a starred review, Publishers Weekly wrote that the book is an "extraordinary science fiction epic... perfect for fans of big ideas and intimate reflections." A writer for Tor.com said "The Vanished Birds may be one of the best debuts of 2020" and praised the way in which the plot developed and showcased the interconnected lives of the characters. A Lambda Literary review praised the novel's exploration of human cruelty, the need for family, and its realistic depictions of the ways in which technology might affect human civilization in the future. A reviewer for The A.V. Club called the novel "impressively ambitious" and felt that the strongest sections of the novel were devoted to the characters' interpersonal relationships, both romantic and platonic. The same reviewer found the quality of the various interludes to be somewhat uneven. A review in The Nerd Daily praised the introductory section but felt that the final part of the novel did not live up to the promise of the first, stating that the plot structure is "the main flaw of this otherwise flawless debut novel".

Year	Award	Category	Result	Ref
2020	Goodreads Choice Awards	Science Fiction	Finalist	
2021	Arthur C. Clarke Award	—	Shortlisted	
2021	British Fantasy Award	Best Newcomer (Sydney J. Bounds Award)	Shortlisted	
2021	Locus Award	First Novel	Finalist	
