= Brother Alive =

2022 novel by Zain Khalid

- Author: Zain Khalid
- Language: English
- Publisher: Grove Atlantic
- Publication date: July 12, 2022
- Publication place: United States
- ISBN: 9780802159762

Brother Alive is American writer Zain Khalid's debut novel. It received the New York Public Library Young Lions Fiction Award and was a finalist for the National Book Critics Circle John Leonard Prize for best first book in any genre. It was also awarded the CLMP Firecracker Award for Fiction, and was shortlisted for the Ursula K. Le Guin Prize. Khalid was named the recipient of the 2024 Bard Fiction Prize, and was awarded the National Book Foundation's 5 Under 35 prize.

== Reception ==
Brother Alive received favorable reviews from critics and went on to win multiple awards. The New York Times named Khalid a Writer to Watch.

Pete Tosiello, writing for The New York Times Book Review, called the novel "beguiling", noting that the "epistolary structure lend[s] a confessional tone". He further praised the writing style, noting, "Khalid is such a gifted commentator that his methods bear close examination [...] Brother Alive is neither a press bulletin nor a position paper. Khalid’s sentences abound with florid, poetic metaphors while maintaining the clipped, declarative tempo of Scripture."

Library Journal's Luke Gorham said the book is " One the most exciting debuts in recent years.” and that it is "blisteringly intelligent, bursting with profound feeling, and host to some of the most complex, necessary characters in recent memory." He referred to the novel as "genre-defying", noting that "Khalid’s vision can be bleak, even cynical, but it’s also remarkably cogent and underscored with a profound tenderness".

Publishers Weekly highlighted how "Khalid brilliantly reveals new shades of truth from each character’s point of view, and perfectly integrates the many ideas about capitalism and religious extremism into an enthralling narrative".

The judges for the Community of Literary Magazines and Presses Firecracker Award for Fiction described the book as "...surreal, complex, puzzling, mind-expanding, imaginative, original, and presciently relevant to our times."

On behalf of the Cleveland Review of Books, Jonah Howell referred to it as "a smooth interleaving of science-fiction with high-resolution realism and hallucinatory phantasmagoria" and noted " that it’s one of those books that appear only seldomly and bellow, from the first page, from the first line, that they require, beyond the valence-judgements expected of a review, earnest, laborious exploration."

UK publication Buzz called the novel "An impressive feat of literary ambition".

The Atlantic's Jonah Bromwich said, "The cynicism of Brother Alive is countered by the incredible warmth with which Khalid writes about his city". He also noted that the novel "feels like the first since the onset of the coronavirus pandemic that captures the mood of New York right now, describing a wounded city where, rather than holding on to what’s gone, residents are eager to rid themselves of the recent past". Bromwich noted, however, that "when the book leaves the city, it tumbles off its axis [...] without the backdrop of New York, the abstractions pile up and the churning plot ceases to satisfy".

On a similar note, Booklist's Terry Hong said the novel is "riotous with erudition" and that the "multilayered, nonlinear narrative turns unwieldy and ultimately disappointing as an exercise in sly cleverness rather than rewarding storytelling."

Kirkus Reviews called the novel "bulky" and "ambitious", noting that "Khalid has plenty to say about art, relationships, religion, and family [...] But the novel creaks from its overabundance of ambition [...] Whatever power Brother might have as a symbol for hidden lives and alternate existences is sapped by the busy plotting. Khalid has an admirably encyclopedist instinct, but he’s set an almost impossibly high bar for storytelling".

The novel has been translated to German.

== Awards ==
Awards for Brother Alive
| Year | Award | | Result | Ref |
|---|---|---|---|---|
| 2022 | National Book Critics Circle Award | John Leonard Prize | Shortlisted | |
| 2023 | Community of Literary Magazines and Presses | Firecracker Award for Fiction | Won | |
| 2023 | Ursula K. Le Guin Prize | — | Shortlisted | |
| 2023 | Ferro-Grumley Award | LGBTQ Fiction | Shortlisted | |
| 2023 | Young Lions Fiction Award | — | Won | |
| 2024 | Bard Fiction Prize | — | Won | |
