= Greenhollow Duology =

Series of fantasy romance novellas by Emily Tesh

- Cover art for Silver in the Wood, first novella in the Greenhollow Duology
- Silver in the Wood (2019); Drowned Country (2020)
- Author: Emily Tesh
- Country: United Kingdom
- Language: English
- Genre: Fantasy, romance
- Publisher: Tor.com
- Published: 18 June 2019; 18 August 2020
- No. of books: 2

The Greenhollow Duology is a series of two fantasy romance novellas by British writer Emily Tesh. The first entry in the series, Silver in the Wood, won the 2020 World Fantasy Award for Best Novella.

== Plot ==
=== Silver in the Wood ===
Tobias Finch has served as the Wild Man of Greenhollow Wood for centuries. He protects nearby villagers from magical creatures in the wood, along with his dryads and cat. He meets Henry Silver, a folklore scholar and the new landlord of Greenhollow Hall. When Tobias is shot by a villager as he fights off a creature, he recuperates at Greenhollow Hall. Finch and Silver forge a romantic connection. Silver is then captured by the Lord of Summer, Fabian Rafaela, a lich and former friend of Tobias. With Silver's mother Adela, Tobias confronts Fabian and kills him. During this conflict, he loses his powers, and Silver disappears. Months later, Tobias discovers Silver in the wood; Silver has gained Tobias's powers as the new Wild Man of the Wood.

=== Drowned Country ===
Two years after the events of the first story, Silver has become the new Wild Man of the Woods, and Tobias has ended their romantic relationship. Tobias now works for Mrs. Silver. One day, Henry receives a letter from his mother; she is investigating the disappearance of Maud Lindherst, who has been kidnapped by a vampire. Silver agrees to help.

Tobias and Silver search for Maud, finding that she has already killed the vampire in question. Maud is also a scholar of folklore; she is interested in finding Fairyland. Silver uses his powers to open a door to Fairyland, which is empty. Most of the fairies have died out in the preceding centuries; only a servant and the Fairy Queen remain. The Queen attempts to possess Maud, but she is defeated by Silver's magic. Silver, Tobias, and Maud return to their world. Maud begins to work for Mrs. Silver. The fairy servant becomes the new Lord of Greenhollow Wood, allowing Silver to become mortal once again and to rekindle his relationship with Tobias.

== Themes ==
The character of Maud Lindhurst has been praised and has been compared to the character of Mina Harker from Bram Stoker's Dracula. In contrast to many female characters of the Victorian era, Maud is often bold and reckless. While Henry Silver's actions are praised, Maud's similar pursuits are not considered to be socially desirable for a woman of her era. Nonetheless, the author never criticizes Maud for her desire for freedom.

== Reception ==
A reviewer for Locus called Silver in the Wood "a splendid piece of work", praising its evocative prose. Publishers Weekly called it an "exhilarating debut" and a "queer spin on the Green Man myth". Publishers Weekly also gave a starred review to Drowned Country, praising the horror elements of Fairyland as well as the romance between Tobias and Silver. A review from Book Riot praised the way in which Drowned Country expands on the mythology of its predecessor, as well as the "strong ensemble of characters".

! Year	Work	Award	Result	Ref.
2020	Silver in the Wood	World Fantasy Award for Best Novella	Won	
2020	Silver in the Wood	Crawford Award	Shortlisted	

== See also ==
- Some Desperate Glory, a novel also by Tesh
