= Vajra Chandrasekera =

Sri Lankan fantasy author

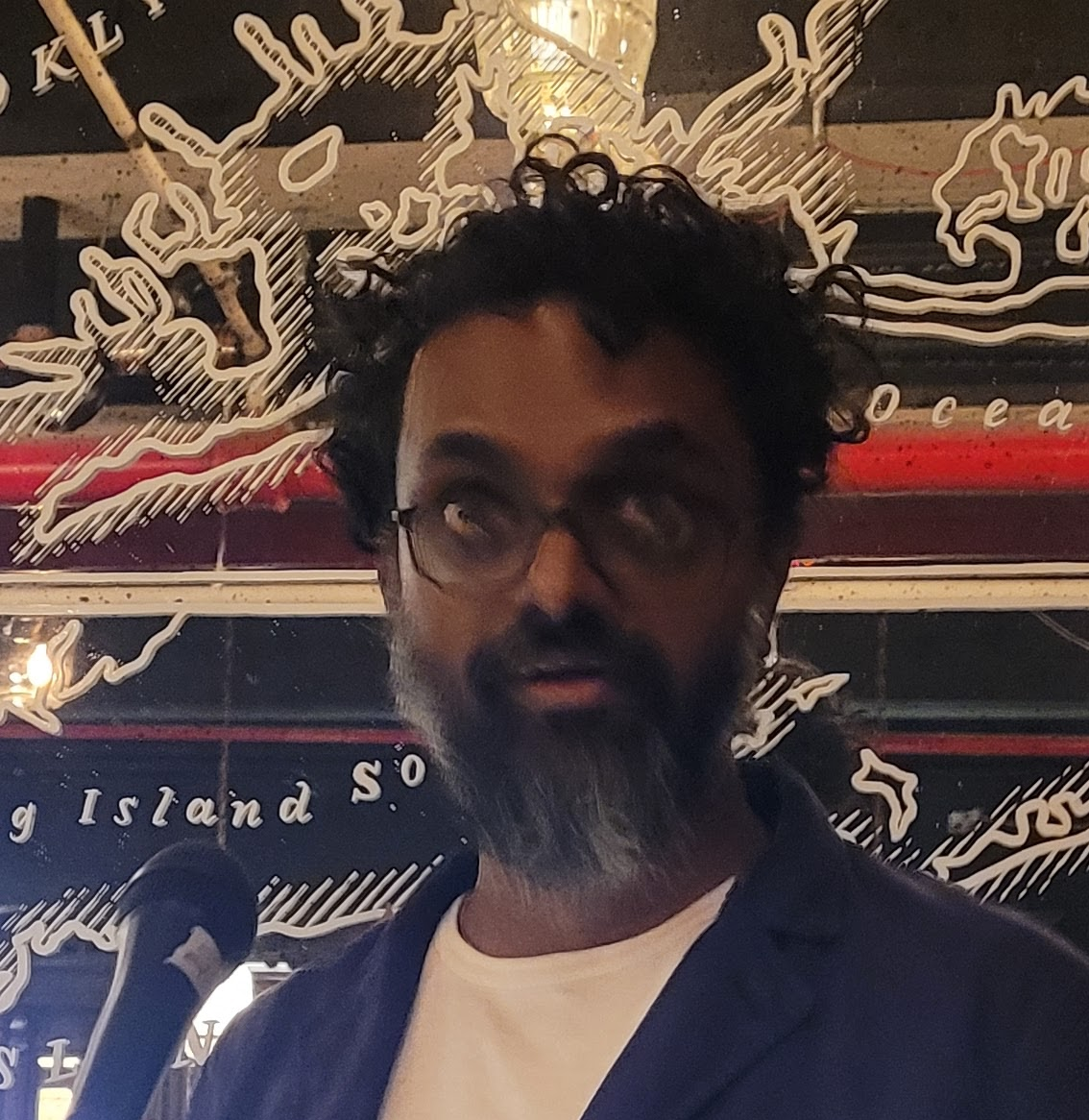
- Chandrasekera, 2023
- Born: August 17, 1979 (age 47); Colombo, Sri Lanka
- Occupation: Writer
- Spouse: Nandini Ramachandran
- Writing career
- Language: English
- Genres: fantasy, science fiction
- Notable awards: Nebula Award for Best Novel (2023); Locus Award for Best First Novel (2024); Crawford Award (2024); Ursula K. Le Guin Prize (2025)
- Website: vajra.me

Vajra Chandrasekera is a Sri Lankan author known for his fantasy and science fiction novels and short stories. His debut novel, The Saint of Bright Doors, won the 2023 Nebula Award for Best Novel and the 2024 Locus Award for Best First Novel.

== Early life and background ==
Chandrasekera was born and raised in Colombo, Sri Lanka. His father was a writer and civil servant. Chandrasekera wrote his first short story at nine years old and had his first publication with a Sri Lankan newspaper when he was twelve. His first job at the age of eighteen was "writing fake product reviews of computer hardware." He later became a non-fiction editor in Sri Lanka.

== Career ==
In 2012, he published the poem "Jörmungandr" in Ideomancer. He followed this with the 2013 short stories "Pockets Full of Stones" in Clarkesworld Magazine and "The Jackal's Wedding" for Apex Magazine. His short story "The Translator, at Low Tide" was a finalist for the 2021 Theodore Sturgeon Memorial Award.

In 2023, Chandrasekera published his first novel, The Saint of Bright Doors. In a review for The New York Times, Amal El-Mohtar described the novel as the best book of the year. Jake Casella Brookins, for Locus, described the book as "truly superb" with rich cityscape details and deep investigations of the writing of history and the desire for revolution. Both reviewers noted the novel's stretching of the fantasy genre. Publishers Weekly described the book as "lyrical but sluggish."

The Saint of Bright Doors, won the 2023 Nebula Award, 2024 Locus Award, 2024 Crawford Award, and 2024 Ignyte Award. The book was shortlisted for the 2024 Ursula K. Le Guin Prize and several others. It was listed as a New York Times Notable Book, Editors’ Pick, and Best Fantasy of 2023.

In 2024, Chandrasekera published his second novel, Rakesfall. It focuses on the reincarnations of Annelid and Leveret through a set of tales in a mixture of perspectives, genres, and plotlines. The book begins with the friends' youth during the fallout of the Sri Lankan civil war. Madeline Schultz, for the Chicago Review of Books, praised the book's unique exploration of colonialism and imperialism, but critiqued the descriptions and disorientation between episodes. New York Times and Publishers Weekly reviews noted the book's challenge and payoff, with Publishers Weekly praising the book's lyricism. Ian Mond, for Locus, said the book's many sections could leave a reader "bewildered," but the ideas and exploration of Sri Lankan colonial history compelled readers forward. Helena Ramsaroop, for Strange Horizons, wrote that Rakesfall compellingly shows grief and hope in the pursuit of liberation. Rakesfall won the 2024 Otherwise Award and 2025 Ursula K. Le Guin Prize. It was also nominated for the 2024 Nebula Award and 2025 Locus Award. The book was a New York Times Notable Book of 2024. It was featured on "The Best Sci-Fi Books of 2024" by Esquire and "The Best Books of 2024" by NPR.

Chandrasekera has placed himself in the New Wave, New Weird, and slipstream literary movements, as well as the blended-genre term science fantasy. He is the author of more than 50 short stories, as well as numerous essays and reviews.

He was one of the 2025-2026 Cullman Center Fellows at the New York Public Library, where he spent his time working on a novel.

His third novel, Hero Come Home, is set to be published on July 7, 2027 from Tor Books.

== Awards and reception ==
Chandrasekera was an editor for the speculative fiction magazine Strange Horizons during the six consecutive years that it was a finalist for the Hugo Award for Best Semiprozine.

Year	Title	Award	Category	Result	Ref
2021	"The Translator, at Low Tide"	Theodore Sturgeon Award	—	Finalist	
2023	The Saint of Bright Doors	BSFA Award	Novel	Longlisted	
2023	The Saint of Bright Doors	Nebula Award	Novel	Won	
2024	The Saint of Bright Doors	British Fantasy Awards	Best Newcomer	Shortlisted	
2024	The Saint of Bright Doors	Crawford Award	—	Won	
2024	The Saint of Bright Doors	Dragon Award	Science Fiction Novel	Nominee	
2024	The Saint of Bright Doors	Hugo Award	Novel	Finalist	
2024	The Saint of Bright Doors	Ignyte Award	Novel – Adult	Won	
2024	The Saint of Bright Doors	Lambda Literary Award	Speculative Fiction	Finalist	
2024	The Saint of Bright Doors	Locus Award	First Novel	Won	
2024	The Saint of Bright Doors	Ursula K. Le Guin Prize	—	Finalist	
2024	Rakesfall	Nebula Award	Novel	Finalist	
2024	Rakesfall	Otherwise Award	—	Won	
2025	Rakesfall	Locus Award	Science Fiction Novel	Finalist	
2025	Rakesfall	Ursula K. Le Guin Prize	—	Won	

== Bibliography ==
=== Novels ===
- The Saint of Bright Doors. Tor Books. 2023. ISBN 9781250847386.
- Rakesfall. Tor Books. 2024. ISBN 9781250847683.
- Hero Come Home. Tor Books. 2027. ISBN 9781250847720.

=== Short fiction ===
- "Pockets Full of Stones", Clarkesworld Magazine (July 2013)
- "The Jackal's Wedding", Apex Magazine (November 2013)
- "On Being Undone by a Light Breeze", Lackington’s Magazine (May 2014)
- "Documentary", Lightspeed Magazine (March 2015)
- "Sweet Marrow", Strange Horizons (July 2016)
- "Applied Cenotaphics in the Long, Long Longitudes", Strange Horizons (September 2016)
- “Apologia“, The Digital Aesthete (September 2019)
- "The Translator, at Low Tide", Clarkesworld Magazine (May 2020)
- “Peristalsis“, Deadlands #1 (May 2021)
- “Theses on the Scientific Management of Goetic Labour“, Uncanny Magazine (July 2023)
- "The Mercer Seat", The Digital Aesthete (December 2023)
- "Death and Liquidity Under the New Moon", Sunday Morning Transport (July 2025)
- "The Age of Cancer", Lightspeed Magazine (August 2026)

=== Anthology appearances ===
- Keffy R.M. Kehrli, ed. (August 2017). "Ulder". GlitterShip Year One. CreateSpace. ISBN 9781973799535.
- Bogi Takács, ed. (October 2017). "Rhizomatic Diplomacy". Transcendent 2: The Year's Best Transgender Speculative Fiction. Lethe Press. ISBN 9781590216620.
- Nicole B. Jacobson, ed. (November 2018). "The Dreaded Name: Thirty-Nine Crowdsourced Annotations on an Anonymous Manifesto Promoting Tactical Human Extinction". The Internet Is Where the Robots Live Now. Paper Dog Books. ISBN 9781732863705.
- Angie Dell; Joey Eschrich, eds. (January 2019). "Half-Eaten Cities". Everything Change: An Anthology of Climate Fiction, Volume II. Center for Science and the Imagination, Arizona State University. ISBN 9780999590270.
- Lincoln Michel; Nadxieli Nieto, eds. (October 2020). "Joy, and Other Poisons". Tiny Nightmares: Very Short Stories of Horror. Catapult. ISBN 9781948226622.
- Tarun K. Saint, ed. (September 2021). "The Maker of Memorials". The Gollancz Book of South Asian Science Fiction: Volume 2. Hachette India. ISBN 9789391028626.
- Neil Clarke, ed. (January 2022). "The Translator, at Low Tide". The Best Science Fiction of the Year - Volume 6. Night Shade Books. ISBN 9781949102536.
- Tarun K. Saint; Francesco Verso, eds. (January 2024). "Half-Eaten Cities". Ecoceanic: Southern Flows. Future Fiction. ISBN 9788832077919.
- Indrapramit Das, ed. (October 2024). "The Limner Wrings His Hands". Deep Dream Science Fiction Exploring the Future of Art. MIT Press. ISBN 9780262549080.

=== Anthology (as editor) ===
- Afterlives: The Year's Best Death Fiction 2023. Psychopomp. 2024. ISBN 9798891160064.
