= The Works of Vermin =

2025 book

- Author: Hiron Ennes
- Language: English
- Publisher: Tor Books
- Publication date: October 14, 2025
- Publication place: United States
- Pages: 432
- ISBN: 978-1250811219

The Works of Vermin is a 2025 novel by Hiron Ennes.

It was a finalist for both the Sunburst Award and Ursula K. Le Guin Prize.

== Plot summary ==
In the city of Tiliard, a deadly metropolis carved into the stump of an ancient tree, an exterminator named Guy Moulène takes on the task to hunt a venomous centipede the size of a dragon.

== Critical reception ==
Ed Crocker of Grimdark Magazine gave the novel a positive review, saying that, "filled with some of the most twisted, inventive worldbuilding you’ll ever see and a perfectly poised balance of ruthless mockery of the decadent and corrupt with a well of deep humanity for those beneath them, The Works of Vermin is not just a landmark novel of dystopian satire but one of the great speculative works of the twenty-first century." Zachary Gillan of The Ancillary Review of Books praised the book as "exceptional," saying that it was "a triumph: a must-read for those of us who like our fantasy weird and unsettling and dismissive of boundaries—those of us, in other words, who love the New Weird." Paul Di Filippo of Locus praised the novel as "nothing like anything you’ll read this year. It’s outrageously inventive and gaudy; funny yet chilling; humanistic yet cynical."

Writing in The Los Angeles Review of Books, John Knych of the IÉSEG School of Management gave the book a mixed review, praising it that its "atmosphere is thrilling and the story is propelled by intimacies and shocking and profound revelations," but criticising the characters for being overly two-dimensional and saying that "the sheer quantity of art references is excessive and sometimes tedious." Niall Harrison of Locus wrote that the novel "is so good at what it does that I enjoyed it an enormous amount despite the fact that I’m not sure, in the end, that all of what it does is good for me," saying that "the problem, if it is a problem, is in what it all means, and that in turn depends on how fervently you believe in The Power Of Art."

== Awards ==
Year	Award	Category	Result	Ref.
2026	Aldiss Award	—	Longlisted	
2026	Sunburst Award	—	Finalist	
2026	Ursula K. Le Guin Prize	—	Finalist	
