= The Spear Cuts Through Water =

2022 fantasy novel by Simon Jimenez

- Author: Simon Jimenez
- Language: English
- Genre: Fantasy
- Publisher: Del Rey Books
- Publication date: 30 Aug 2022
- Pages: 518 (hardback)
- Awards: British Fantasy Award (2023); Crawford Award (2023)
- ISBN: 9780593156599

The Spear Cuts Through Water is a 2022 fantasy novel by Filipino-American writer Simon Jimenez. The novel contains a frame story about a grandchild listening to stories of the Old Country; it also tells the story of two men who journey across the Old Country with a dying goddess. It is Jimenez's second novel. The novel received critical acclaim, winning the 2023 British Fantasy Award for Best Novel as well as the Crawford Award. It was shortlisted for the 2023 Ignyte Award and Ursula K. Le Guin Prize.

== Plot ==
In a frame story, a grandmother (“lola”) tells stories of the Old Country to her grandchild. She tells a story about how the Moon and the Water were in love, and together they created the Inverted Theater. The grandchild visits the Inverted Theater in a dream. They are carrying a spear which is their family heirloom. This moonlit body, a child of the Water and the Moon, performs the following story for the grandchild and other visitors to the Theater.

The people of the Old Country suffer under the rule of Moon Emperor Magaam Ossa and his sons, the Three Terrors. The emperor enforces his control over the population with the help of a network of psychic tortoises, who can transmit information instantaneously. Saam Ossa, the First Terror, leads the Red Peacock Brigade. The Red Peacocks are all sons of the First Terror, and they regularly torment the population. The emperor keeps the Moon goddess, his empress, imprisoned under the palace. The First Terror's favorite son Jun is assigned to guard the goddess. With Jun's help, the Moon goddess kills the emperor and escapes.

Commander Uhi Araya works at Tiger Gate. Araya enlists the help of Keema, a one-armed man who works for her. She asks him to deliver a spear to a woman named Shan. Jun and Keema escape Tiger Gate with the goddess and the spear. Araya and the other guards are killed by the First Terror and the Peacocks. Keema and Jun travel with the goddess, who is ancient and close to death, as well as the Defect, a disabled tortoise. Inside the empress's wagon, Keema finds that one of the emperor's prized birds has been tied up. He frees the bird, which follows them and assists them for the remainder of their journey. They are pursued by the First Terror.

Luubu Ossa, the Second Terror, has killed and eaten the tortoise god, allowing him to take its powers. Luubu captures the party and begins eating the empress. The Defect is killed; Araya's spear falls into a lake and is lost. Luubu forces the First Terror to kill all of the Peacocks except Jun. The goddess escapes, killing both Terrors. She asks Jun and Keema to eat her body and kill the Third Terror. Having used the last of her energy, she dies. At this point, the story in the Inverted Theater reaches its intermission.

As a result of consuming the goddess's corpse, Keema and Jun gain some of her powers. In a dream, they enter the Inverted Theater, where the grandchild sees them. This moonlit body tells Jun and Keema that the Water will destroy the Old Country in order to retrieve the bones of its lover, the Moon goddess. They have the power to stop the Water, but they will die in the process. This moonlit body reveals that the grandchild is Uhi Araya's descendant, and that the spear they are carrying is the same one from the tale. The grandchild gives their spear to Keema.

Keema and Jun return to their world, to the Divine City where the Third Terror lives. Keema and Jun meet Shan, Uhi Araya's daughter, and give her the spear. The emperor's bird appears and reveals that it is really the Third Terror, a shapeshifter. The Third Terror has fallen in love with Keema, but Keema rejects him. Jun and Keema lead the Terror away from the Divine City as a tsunami approaches the area. Keema challenges the Terror to a duel. The Terror wins, but allows Keema to live. Keema and Jun dance together. The Water crashes over Keema, Jun, and the Third Terror. It retrieves the bones of the Moon Goddess and spares the city.

Shan recovers the spear, which is passed through many generations of her descendants until it reaches the grandchild in the Inverted Theater. The grandchild questions the performer about whether or not the story was truly a love story, as their lola had said. This moonlit body asks the Water to show mercy. As a new Moon hangs in the sky, Shan finds Keema and Jun alive. Jun leaves the city, afraid that he will suffer for his past war crimes as a Peacock and unwilling to ask Keema to suffer with him. Keema catches up to him; they make love in the forest and decide to journey together into their future.

== Major themes ==
According to Jake Casella Brookins of the Chicago Review of Books, a major theme of the novel is storytelling. The novel itself is a story about storytelling. Many of the characters, including Keema and Jun, are "attempting to revise, obscure, or restart their own stories, to figure out how to make sense of—and peace with—how their lives compare to the stories they thought they knew." Casella Brookins also writes that the novel explores the themes of violence and trauma in a way that is different from many fantasy novels, which often gloss over the deaths of "faceless" minor characters. By "head-hopping" between characters, Jimenez "refuses to dismiss the cost of violence."

== Style ==
The story alternates between first, second, and third person narration. In the second-person sections, the reader is cast as Araya's descendant and current keeper of the spear.

According to Chicago Review of Books, there are three layers to the story. The story of Keema and Jun serves as the novel's core and is a fantasy adventure. This story is explicitly told to "you", observing the story in the Inverted Theater. In the Inverted Theater, the story is told through dance, and parts are heard from ghosts or spirits. Interjections feel like "stage directions, or exclamations, or internal monologue." Additionally, the narrative often expands from the primary narrator of each section to allow other characters to speak directly, much like a Greek chorus.

== Reception ==
The novel received critical acclaim. Kirkus Reviews gave the novel a starred review, calling it "part poem, part prose—not to be missed by anyone." Kirkus later named the novel one of the best science fiction and fantasy books of the year. Publishers Weekly also wrote a positive review, stating that the difficult style made a "steep barrier to entry" but praising the "beautiful prose and inventive worldbuilding."

Writing for Locus, Paul Di Filippo wrote that "some works of SF [are] so unique that they don’t really inspire any scions, homages or imitations." In this category he included works such as The Stars My Destination, Lord of Light, and The Spear Cuts Through Water. De Filippo wrote that Jimenez's work is unique but compared it favorably to the works of Roger Zelazny. In a review for Book Page, Noah Fram praised the novel's prose, calling it "dense and poetic." Fram also wrote that the story "never forgets the pair of humans" at the center of its plot, despite being a tale of "gods and demons."

Year	Award	Category	Result	Ref.
2022	Kirkus Reviews Best of 2022	SF & Fantasy	Listed	
2023	British Fantasy Award	Fantasy Novel	Won	
2023	Crawford Award	—	Won	
2023	Ignyte Award	Adult Novel	Finalist	
2023	Ursula K. Le Guin Prize	—	Shortlisted	
