= Urvashi Bahuguna =

Indian poet and essayist

- Born: Cuttack, India
- Education: University of East Anglia (MA)
- Occupations: Poet; essayist
- Website: Official website

Urvashi Bahuguna is an Indian poet and essayist.

== Life and career ==
Born in Cuttack, Bahuguna grew up in Goa, and moved to Delhi during her high school years. She attended Delhi University for her undergraduate degree, and graduated from the University of East Anglia with a master's degree in creative writing (poetry) in 2014. As of 2017 she lived in Delhi.

In 2017 she was awarded the Emerging Poet's Prize by the (Great) Indian Poetry Collective for her debut collection of poems, Terrarium. She was selected for the award by Aimee Nezhukumatathil. The collection was described by the HuffPost as "the poetry of our planet [...] terrestrial, atmospheric, oceanic", and a review by The Hindu said that Bahuguna's poetry "will draw your attention to our fragile planet, making you fall in love with it". She has also received the Charles Wallace India Trust Fellowship, a Sangam House fellowship, an Eclectica Spotlight Author Prize, and a TOTO Award for Creative Writing.

In 2021 she published a collection of essays titled No Straight Thing Was Ever Made: Essays on Mental Health. The Hindu said that the collection "comforts, confronts and challenges" readers. In 2022, her poetry was included in The Penguin Book of Indian Poets, edited by Jeet Thayil; she is one of the youngest writers included in the anthology.

== Selected works ==
- Terrarium (The (Great) Indian Poetry Collective, 2019)
- No Straight Thing Was Ever Made: Essays on Mental Health (Penguin Random House, 2021)
