= The Employees =

2020 novel by Danish writer Olga Ravn

- First edition (Danish)
- Author: Olga Ravn
- Original title: De Ansatte
- Language: Danish
- Publisher: Lolli Editions (United Kingdom); New Directions Press (United States)
- Publication place: Denmark

The Employees is a novel by Danish writer Olga Ravn published May 24 2018. An English translation by Martin Aitken was published October 1 2020. The novel details the interactions between human and android crew members aboard a futuristic spacecraft as they encounter and react to a series of mysterious alien objects.

== Plot ==
=== Summary ===
Sometime in the future, a mixed group of humans and human-like androids are sent to research a succession of alien objects that they obtain from the planet “New Discovery”, which is located very far from Earth. Their ship (The Six Thousand Ship) orbits above the planet's surface. The corporation in charge of the ship sends a group of impartial mediators to conduct an 18 month long interview of the ship's workers to see the impact these objects have on the crew. Tensions rise between the crew's two factions as the objects begin to inspire profound emotional reactions. The objects are all rich sensory articles, which sharply contrast to the insipid, antiseptic lifestyle aboard the ship. The crew members begin to question the meanings of their lives beyond work. Following the final collection of the crew members' statements, the authoritative committee which employs them disintegrates the biological material aboard the ship, including both the humans and the humanoids, citing the effects the strange objects had on the crew.

=== Structure ===
The book consists of a series of reports collected from the crew members of the ship by mediators from the corporation in charge of the ship. The messages are non-consecutive, and relayed to a nameless administration. The crew complains about their daily tasks in these memos and reports. Some excerpts from these interviews are missing entirely, others have sections redacted. The messages are out of order, perhaps due to the committee compiling the investigation jumbling the papers together in a pile. These partisan statements expose the visceral reactions experienced by each character and illustrate the gradual changes they experience within themselves.

== Characters ==
The crew consists of a mostly-unnamed mixed group of humans and humanoids. At times it is difficult to separate the born from the manufactured characters. Each class expresses their own internal conflicts: many of the humans experience longing for their lives back on Earth as a result of their isolation on the spaceship, while the humanoids begin to exhibit complex emotions and cognitions that seem to exceed the limitations of their coding. An unnamed committee is responsible for compiling interviews with the crew into the reports that make up the book. The committee's purpose for the interviews is to learn more about the effects of the objects taken aboard the ship. One of the few characters given a name is Dr. Lund. He is credited with the invention of the humanoid crew members and is the director of the Six Thousand Ship.

== Setting ==
=== The Six-Thousand Ship ===
The Six-Thousand Ship is organized and self-sufficient, with crew members working in areas to meet every potential need. However, the ship is also described as sterile and barren. Once aboard, the characters are separated from nature and inescapably contained. The ship houses strange objects collected from the distant planet "New Discovery", which the ship perpetually orbits. The exhibition room that contains these objects has white walls, impassive spaces, and corridors between installations.

=== Technology ===
Ravn imagines futuristic technologies with which the crew interacts. These technologies tend to blur the lines between the biological and the mechanical. The humanoid crew members receive occasional updates to their programming and can even have their memories uploaded to a database, granting them a form of immortality. There are also mentions of holograms resembling the children of the crew members, and add-ons that can be attached to the human members of the crew.

== Allegory and themes ==
=== Criticism of the workplace ===
The structure of The Employees implies an allegory of the modern workplace, as a corporate entity conducts a series of interviews of the ship's crew, aimed towards performance review. There exists a hierarchy between the human crew members and the humanoids, though it is ambiguous who is above the other, with either group envying the other at points in the novel. Though divided, both the humans and humanoids are controlled by a distant, anonymous corporation. Some humanoids cannot imagine life outside of their work, while others dream of escape from the ship's monotony.

=== Transhumanism ===
Ravn explores a theme of transhumanism in The Employees, with some humans describing a mysterious "add-on" connected to their bodies. There is also a rift between the humans, or mortal, and the humanoids, who can be continuously reuploaded. There is also a sense that the mysterious objects are in some way connecting to the ship's crew.

=== Senses ===
Ravn contrasts the senses of the humans and the humanoids. The humans have worn out senses and relate to objects via nostalgia, while the humanoids have childlike senses, often wanting to use their mouth as a sensory tool. There is a focus on the different rooms of The Employees stimulating all of the senses. Ravn also describes egg clusters, open pores, dotted flesh in a manner evocative of trypophobia. A section of The Employees focuses entirely on skin doing unusual things, adding to the author's intention of giving an off-putting feeling to the reader.

=== Eggs and parenting ===
One of the objects, a sack of eggs, is meant to emphasize collectivist themes, as well as the "born-vs-made" dynamic aboard the ship. One egg symbolizes the individual, but since The Employees gives the perspectives of many, a sack of them represents the crew. In addition, half of The Employees' characters were created artificially, so the author uses eggs to show the importance of flesh in the story. Eggs also allude to child-rearing, with examples of carrying, caring for things, and production found frequently in The Employees. Furthermore, before some humans go to sleep in their bunks, they communicate with holograms resembling their children.

== Inspiration ==
Ravn credits artist Lea Guldditte Hestelund for inspiring the objects that the crew interacts with. The objects were modeled after sculptures included in the Danish artist's exhibition titled Consumed Future Spewed Up as Present, which was displayed at Copenhagen's Overgaden art institute. Ravn decided to write the book after Hestelund reached out to her requesting a written accompaniment for her upcoming art show. Ravn shared that while working with Hestelund she drew inspiration from other sources as well: the futuristic setting in space was inspired by clips from NASA which Ravn had recently viewed, and the commentary on the workplace emanated from Ravn's own dissatisfaction with her office job. A copy of the book, bound in leather, was eventually included at the Overgaden exhibition.

Additionally, Ravn notes how American science fiction writer Ursula K. Le Guin inspired the episodic and intermittent structure of the book as well as some of its themes, namely the frequent occurrence of egg-like objects throughout the book. Also notable is Ravn's inclusion of a paraphrasing of the quote by Barbara Kruger: "It's a small world, but not if you have to clean it."

== Reception ==
=== Critical reception ===
The Employees was positively reviewed by critics, many of whom praised the novel for its investigation into what it means to be human. Critics also appreciated the novel's critique of the modern workplace and reflections on transhumanism. Justine Jordan of The Guardian summarized the thoughts of many critics, calling The Employees a "an audacious satire of corporate language and the late-capitalist workplace, and a winningly abstracted investigation into what it means to be human."

The Employees drew comparison from critics to many popular science fiction stories. Brian Dillion of 4Columns compares the "near-humanoid slaves" of The Employees to the replicants in the 1982 film Blade Runner. Justine Jordan of The Guardian compares the strange objects on the ship to the trope of alien artifacts in science fiction, such as the ship from Arrival and the monoliths from 2001: A Space Odyssey.

=== Accolades ===
The Employees was shortlisted for the 2021 International Booker Prize. Judges called it a "beautiful and moving novel," and praised it for its experimental structure and exploration of human nature and happiness.
