= A. Igoni Barrett =

Nigerian writer (born 1979)

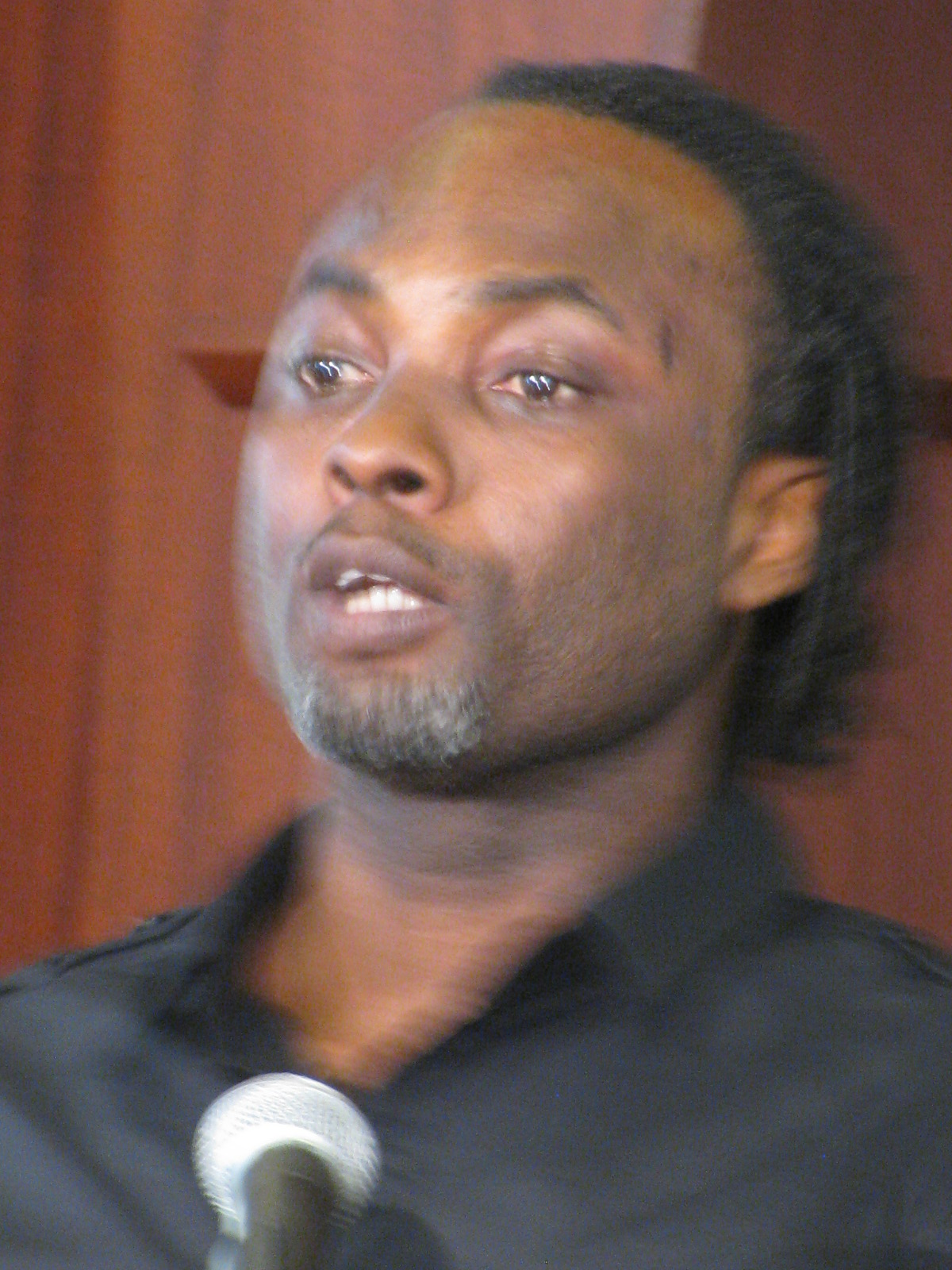
- Born: 26 March 1979 (age 47); Port Harcourt, Nigeria
- Occupation: Writer
- Spouse: Femke van Zeijl
- Parent: Lindsay Barrett (father)
- Writing career
- Language: English
- Genres: Short stories, novels
- Notable work: Blackass (2016)
- Notable awards: Chinua Achebe Center Fellowship

Adrian Igonibo Barrett (born 26 March 1979) is a Nigerian writer of short stories and novels. In 2014, he was named on the Africa39 list of writers aged under 40 with potential and talent to define future trends in African literature. Following his two collections of short stories – From Caves of Rotten Teeth (2005) and Love Is Power, or Something Like That (2013) – his first novel, Blackass, was published in 2015, described by the Chicago Review of Books as "Kafka with a wink".

== Career ==
Born in Port Harcourt, Nigeria, to a Nigerian mother and the Jamaican novelist and poet Lindsay Barrett, A. Igoni Barrett studied agriculture at the University of Ibadan, although one year before graduating he decided that he wanted to be a writer. He has said: "My father was the first person to support me as a writer. I felt I had to prove to myself that I was serious about writing, so I gave the ultimate sacrifice – I gave up my university education for a self-education in writing." In 2007, Barrett moved to Lagos.

His first book, a collection of short stories entitled From Caves of Rotten Teeth, was published in 2005 and reissued in 2008. A story from the collection, "The Phoenix", won the 2005 BBC World Service short story competition.

His second collection of stories, Love Is Power, or Something Like That, was published by Graywolf Press in 2013; according to The Boston Globe, the collection "pulses with an indomitable life force that is, by turns, tender and fierce". Time Out New York commented: "These rich pieces are also brilliantly sequenced.... Shifts in mood happen throughout the book.... Unlikely moments of empathy occur again and again amid wrenching drama and subtle comedy; the resulting collection satisfies on numerous levels." Love is Power, or Something Like That was chosen as a "best book of 2013" by NPR and Flavorwire.

His debut novel, entitled Blackass, was published in 2015. Reviewing it in The Financial Times, Jon Day wrote: "From the first sentence, Kafka’s The Metamorphosis confronts you with the inherent strangeness of the pact you make when you read fiction. Gregor Samsa has become an insect, Kafka says. Suspend your disbelief. Take it or leave it. A Igoni Barrett’s first novel — his third book — demands a similar response....to read him only as a Nigerian writer would be to do him a disservice. For Blackass is a strange, compelling novel, and Barrett has something to tell us all." Writing in The Guardian, Helon Habila said: "Igoni Barrett's greatest asset is his ability to satirise the ridiculous extents people, especially Lagosians, go to in order to appear important." Claire Fallon for the Huffington Post concluded: "Blackass is a blunt, transparently written novel — the kind that makes the reader feel as though they’re standing inside the skin of the character, going about his day with him — and though the topic could easily be that of a polemic, it’s also a subtle, circumspect novel about the intersecting, sometimes mutually exclusive needs humans have for family and connection, and for status and power." Aaron Bady of OkayAfrica calls it "the most unapologetically Nigerian book that American publishers have published in a long time, and as the 'Afropolitan' has become an increasingly omnipresent strand of contemporary African literature, there has been a steady backlash, both against the Afropolitan as such, and against the entire category of African immigrant literature.

Invited as a participant to various literary festivals, Barrett was a guest reader on the opening night of the PEN World Voices Festival in 2013, and a guest writer at the Serpentine Galleries' Miracle Marathon in 2016 and the 2018 edition of Festivaletteratura. He was the founding organizer of the BookJam reading series in Lagos, which featured the writers Jude Dibia, Michela Wrong, Chimamanda Ngozi Adichie, Binyavanga Wainaina, Helon Habila and Tsitsi Dangarembga, among others.

Barrett's work has appeared in several publications, including Al Jazeera English and The Guardian.

== Awards and accolades ==
A. Igoni Barrett was a winner of the BBC World Service short story competition for 2005 with a story entitled "The Phoenix", which was broadcast on 2 January 2006.

In 2010, he was awarded a Chinua Achebe Center Fellowship. In 2011, he was awarded a Norman Mailer Center Fellowship and a Bellagio Center Residency.

Barrett was named as one of 39 sub-Saharan African writers aged under 40 in the Hay Festival and Rainbow Book Club Africa39 project celebrating Port Harcourt UNESCO World Book Capital 2014, the judges being Margaret Busby, Osonye Tess Onwueme and Elechi Amadi, who selected from submissions researched by Binyavanga Wainaina.

Barrett's debut novel Blackass won the People's Literature Publishing House and the Chinese Foreign Literature Society's 21st Century Best Foreign Novel Award.

He was a Civitella Ranieri Foundation Fellow in 2018.

Igoni Barrett was a Charles Dickens Award laureate at the 2021 edition of the International London Literary Award.

== Works ==
- From Caves of Rotten Teeth: A Collection of Short Stories, Daylight Media Services, 2005, ISBN 9789780193591
- Love Is Power, Or Something Like That: Stories, Minneapolis: Graywolf Press, 2013, ISBN 9781555976408
- Blackass, London: Chatto & Windus, 2015, ISBN 9780701188566; Minneapolis: Graywolf Press, 2016, ISBN 978-1-55597-733-7. (Note: Blackass at Graywolf Press.) (Note: Briefly reviewed in the April 25, 2016 issue of The New Yorker, p.95.)

———————
