= Blackass =

2015 novel by Nigerian author A. Igoni Barrett

- First edition
- Author: A. Igoni Barrett
- Publisher: Chatto & Windus
- Publication place: Nigeria
- Media type: Print (Hardcover)

Blackass is a novel by Nigerian author A. Igoni Barrett. It was released in the United Kingdom and Nigeria in 2015, and 2016 in the United States. It received mixed reviews.

== Plot summary ==
Blackass is a story about a young Nigerian Furo Wariboko, who wakes up on the eve of a job interview to discover that he has transformed into a white guy overnight. As he adjusts to his new appearance, he meets Arinze, who offers Furo a far more lucrative job than he expected.

== Reception ==
The Financial Times called Blackass "strange (and) compelling, (...with) something to tell us all", and explicitly compared it to Kafka's The Metamorphosis. Writing in The Guardian, Helon Habila lauded Barrett for "his ability to satirise the ridiculous extents people, especially Lagosians, go to in order to appear important." Claire Fallon for the Huffington Post found the novel to be "blunt (and) transparently written", but also "subtle (and) circumspect." Aaron Bady of Okayafrica stated that it is "the most unapologetically Nigerian book that American publishers have published in a long time".

In 2016, Blackass won the People's Literature Publishing House and the Chinese Foreign Literature Society's 21st Century Best Foreign Novel Award. It was nominated for the inaugural FT/OppenheimerFunds Emerging Voices Awards, the 2017 PEN Open Book Award, the 2015 Kitschies Golden Tentacle Award, and the inaugural Nommo Award for Best Novel. In 2017, Blackass was nominated for a Hurston/Wright Legacy Award in the debut fiction category.
