= The Last Banquet of Temporal Confections =

"The Last Banquet of Temporal Confections" is a fantasy story by Tina Connolly. It was first published on Tor.com, in 2018.

== Synopsis ==
Saffron is a food taster for the cruel Duke Michal, forced to sample the magically psychoactive confections prepared by the Head Pastry Chef — her imprisoned husband, who can only communicate with her via the specific memories and emotions that the pastries evoke.

== Reception ==
"The Last Banquet of Temporal Confections" was a finalist for the 2019 Hugo Award for Best Novelette and the Nebula Award for Best Novelette of 2018.

Tangent Online called it "enchanting" and "clever and well written". Locus observed that the majority of the story is composed of memories of Saffron's life that are evoked by the pastries, with the banquet forming "a great frame narrative that builds tension perfectly." Rocket Stack Rank, however, faulted the conclusion for going against the rules established earlier in the story, with insufficient foreshadowing to indicate that this was possible.
