= Nebula Award for Best Novelette =

Science fiction and fantasy literary award

- Awarded for: The best science fiction or fantasy story of between 7,500 and 17,500 words published in the prior calendar year
- Presented by: Science Fiction and Fantasy Writers Association
- First award: 1966
- Most recent winner: Thomas Ha (Uncertain Sons)
- Website: nebulas.sfwa.org/

The Nebula Award for Best Novelette is given each year by the Science Fiction and Fantasy Writers Association (SFWA) to a science fiction or fantasy novelette. A work of fiction is defined by the organization as a novelette if it is between 7,500 and 17,500 words; awards are also given out for pieces of longer lengths in the Novel and Novella categories, and for shorter lengths in the Short Story category. To be eligible for Nebula Award consideration a novelette must be published in English in the United States. Works published in English elsewhere in the world are also eligible provided they are released on either a website or in an electronic edition. The Nebula Award for Best Novelette has been awarded annually since 1966. The Nebula Awards have been described as one of "the most important of the American science fiction awards" and "the science-fiction and fantasy equivalent" of the Emmy Awards.

Nebula Award nominees and winners are chosen by members of SFWA, though the authors of the nominees do not need to be members. Works are nominated each year by members in a period around December 15 through January 31, and the six works that receive the most nominations then form the final ballot, with additional nominees possible in the case of ties. Soon after, members are given a month to vote on the ballot, and the final results are presented at the Nebula Awards ceremony in May. Authors are not permitted to nominate their own works, and ties in the final vote are broken, if possible, by the number of nominations the works received. The rules were changed to their current format in 2009. Previously, the eligibility period for nominations was defined as one year after the publication date of the work, which allowed the possibility for works to be nominated in the calendar year after their publication and then be awarded in the calendar year after that. Works were added to a preliminary list for the year if they had ten or more nominations, which were then voted on to create a final ballot, to which the SFWA organizing panel was also allowed to add an additional work.

During the 61 nomination years, 245 authors have had works nominated; 53 of these have won, including co-authors and ties. Ted Chiang has won three times out of three nominations, and Poul Anderson, Kelly Link, George R. R. Martin, Sarah Pinsker, and Connie Willis have each won twice out of five, two, four, six, and five nominations, respectively. One of Anderson's nominations was under the pseudonym Michael Karageorge. Ursula K. Le Guin has the most nominations of any author with seven, including one win and not including one withdrawn nomination. James Patrick Kelly and Richard Bowes are tied for the most nominations without winning at six.

== Winners and nominees ==
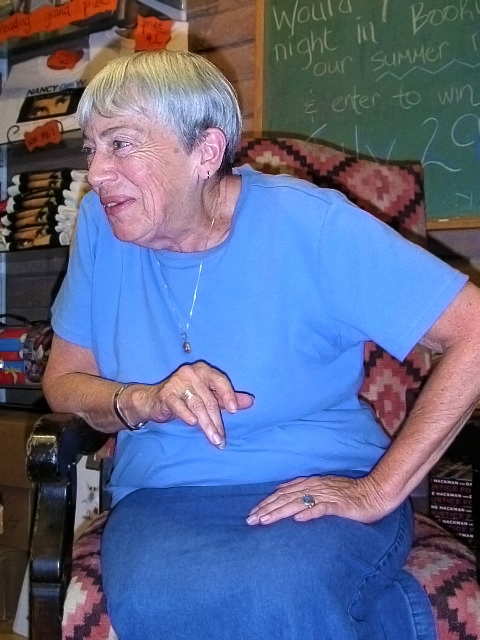
Ursula K. Le Guin has been nominated for the Nebula Award for Best Novelette more times than any other author.

SFWA currently identifies the awards by the year of publication, that is, the year prior to the year in which the award is given. Entries with a yellow background and an asterisk (*) next to the writer's name have won the award; the other entries are the other nominees on the shortlist.

* Winners and joint winners

Winners and nominees
Year	Author(s)	Novelette	Publisher or publication	Ref.
1965	Roger Zelazny*	"The Doors of His Face, the Lamps of His Mouth"	The Magazine of Fantasy & Science Fiction	
1965	James Blish	"The Shipwrecked Hotel"	Galaxy Science Fiction	
1965	Norman L. Knight	"The Shipwrecked Hotel"	Galaxy Science Fiction	
1965	Jonathan Brand	"Vanishing Point"	If	
1965	Thomas M. Disch	"102 H-Bombs"	Fantastic	
1965	R. C. Fitzpatrick	"Half a Loaf"	Analog Science Fact & Fiction	
1965	Joseph Green	"The Decision Makers"	Galaxy Science Fiction	
1965	Norman Kagan	"At the Institute"	Worlds of Tomorrow	
1965	Norman Kagan	"The Earth Merchants"	The Magazine of Fantasy & Science Fiction	
1965	Norman Kagan	"Laugh Along with Franz"	Galaxy Science Fiction	
1965	Michael Karageorge	"The Life of Your Time"	Analog Science Fact & Fiction	
1965	Fritz Leiber	"Four Ghosts In Hamlet"	The Magazine of Fantasy & Science Fiction	
1965	E. Clayton McCarty	"Small One"	If	
1965	Mack Reynolds	"The Adventure of the Extraterrestrial"	Analog Science Fact & Fiction	
1965	Fred Saberhagen	"Masque of the Red Shift"	If	
1965	James H. Schmitz	"Goblin Night"	Analog Science Fact & Fiction	
1965	James H. Schmitz	"Planet of Forgetting"	Galaxy Science Fiction	
1965	J. W. Schutz	"Maiden Voyage"	The Magazine of Fantasy & Science Fiction	
1965	Robert Sheckley	"Shall We Have a Little Talk?"	Galaxy Science Fiction	
1965	William Tenn	"The Masculinist Revolt"	The Magazine of Fantasy & Science Fiction	
1966	Gordon R. Dickson*	"Call Him Lord"	Analog Science Fact & Fiction	
1966	Robert M. Green, Jr.	"Apology to Inky"	The Magazine of Fantasy & Science Fiction	
1966	Charles L. Harness	"An Ornament to His Profession"	Analog Science Fact & Fiction	
1966	Hayden Howard	"The Eskimo Invasion"	Galaxy Science Fiction	
1966	Roger Zelazny	"This Moment of the Storm"	The Magazine of Fantasy & Science Fiction	
1967	Fritz Leiber*	"Gonna Roll the Bones"	Dangerous Visions	
1967	Harlan Ellison	"Pretty Maggie Moneyeyes"	Knight	
1967	Larry Niven	"Flatlander"	If	
1967	Roger Zelazny	"The Keys to December"	New Worlds	
1967	Roger Zelazny	"This Mortal Mountain"	If	
1968	Richard Wilson*	"Mother to the World"	Orbit 3 (G. P. Putnam's Sons)	
1968	Brian W. Aldiss	"Total Environment"	Galaxy Science Fiction	
1968	Poul Anderson	"The Sharing of Flesh"	Galaxy Science Fiction	
1968	James Gunn	"The Listeners"	Galaxy Science Fiction	
1968	H. H. Hollis	"The Guerrilla Trees"	If	
1968	Keith Laumer	"Once There Was a Giant"	The Magazine of Fantasy & Science Fiction	
1968	Barry N. Malzberg	"Final War"	The Magazine of Fantasy & Science Fiction	
1969	Samuel R. Delany*	"Time Considered as a Helix of Semi-Precious Stones"	New Worlds	
1969	Gregory Benford	"Deeper than the Darkness"	The Magazine of Fantasy & Science Fiction	
1969	Ursula K. Le Guin	"Nine Lives"	Playboy	
1969	Norman Spinrad	"The Big Flash"	Orbit 5 (G. P. Putnam's Sons)	
1970	Theodore Sturgeon*	"Slow Sculpture"	Galaxy Science Fiction	
1970	Thomas M. Disch	"The Asian Shore"	Orbit 6 (G. P. Putnam's Sons)	
1970	Gordon Eklund	"Dear Aunt Annie"	Fantastic	
1970	Gerald Jonas	"The Shaker Revival"	Galaxy Science Fiction	
1970	R. A. Lafferty	"Continued on Next Rock"	Orbit 7 (G. P. Putnam's Sons)	
1970	Joanna Russ	"The Second Inquisition"	Orbit 6 (G. P. Putnam's Sons)	
1971	Poul Anderson*	"The Queen of Air and Darkness"	The Magazine of Fantasy & Science Fiction	
1971	Gardner Dozois	"A Special Kind of Morning"	New Dimensions 1 (Doubleday)	
1971	Edgar Pangborn	"Mount Charity"	Universe 1 (Ace Books)	
1971	Joanna Russ	"Poor Man, Beggar Man"	Universe 1 (Ace Books)	
1971	Kate Wilhelm	"The Encounter"	Orbit 8 (G. P. Putnam's Sons)	
1972	Poul Anderson*	"Goat Song"	The Magazine of Fantasy & Science Fiction	
1972	Alfred Bester	"The Animal Fair"	The Magazine of Fantasy & Science Fiction	
1972	Gardner Dozois	"A Kingdom by the Sea"	Orbit 10 (G. P. Putnam's Sons)	
1972	Harlan Ellison	"Basilisk"	The Magazine of Fantasy & Science Fiction	
1972	David Gerrold	"In the Deadlands"	With a Finger In My I (Ballantine Books)	
1972	William Rotsler	"Patron of the Arts"	Universe 2 (Ace Books)	
1972	Kate Wilhelm	"The Funeral"	Again, Dangerous Visions (Doubleday)	
1973	Vonda N. McIntyre*	"Of Mist, and Grass, and Sand"	Analog Science Fact & Fiction	
1973	Harlan Ellison	"The Deathbird"	The Magazine of Fantasy & Science Fiction	
1973	Theodore Sturgeon	"Case and the Dreamer"	Galaxy Science Fiction	
1973	James Tiptree, Jr.	"The Girl Who Was Plugged In"	New Dimensions 3 (Doubleday)	
1974	Gordon Eklund*	"If the Stars Are Gods"	Universe 4 (Random House)	
1974	Gregory Benford*	"If the Stars Are Gods"	Universe 4 (Random House)	
1974	Charles L. Grant	"The Rest Is Silence"	The Magazine of Fantasy & Science Fiction	
1974	Tom Reamy	"Twilla"	The Magazine of Fantasy & Science Fiction	
1975	Tom Reamy*	"San Diego Lightfoot Sue"	The Magazine of Fantasy & Science Fiction	
1975	Eleanor Arnason	"The Warlord of Saturn's Moons"	New Worlds 6 (Sphere Books)	
1975	Michael Bishop	"Blooded on Arachne"	Epoch (Berkley Books)	
1975	Richard Cowper	"The Custodians"	The Magazine of Fantasy & Science Fiction	
1975	Jack Dann	"The Dybbuk Dolls"	New Dimensions 5 (Harper & Row)	
1975	Avram Davidson	"Polly Charms, the Sleeping Woman"	The Magazine of Fantasy & Science Fiction	
1975	Randall Garrett	"The Final Fighting of Fion Mac Cumhail"	The Magazine of Fantasy & Science Fiction	
1975	Ursula K. Le Guin	"The New Atlantis"	The New Atlantis (Hawthorn Books)	
1975	Barry N. Malzberg	"A Galaxy Called Rome"	The Magazine of Fantasy & Science Fiction	
1975	Craig Strete	"The Bleeding Man"	Galaxy Science Fiction	
1975	John Varley	"Retrograde Summer"	The Magazine of Fantasy & Science Fiction	
1976 (Note: "The Diary of the Rose" by Ursula K. Le Guin was initially nominated for Best Novelette in 1977, but was withdrawn by the author before the winner was announced in protest of the revocation of Stanisław Lem's honorary membership in the Science Fiction and Fantasy Writers of America. According to Le Guin, SFWA told her that the work was to be the winner if she did not withdraw it.)	Isaac Asimov*	"The Bicentennial Man"	Stellar 2 (Ballantine Books)	
1976	Grant Carrington	"His Hour Upon the Stage"	Amazing Stories	
1976	Steven Utley	"Custer's Last Jump"	Universe 6 (Doubleday)	
1976	Howard Waldrop	"Custer's Last Jump"	Universe 6 (Doubleday)	
1976	John Varley	"In the Bowl"	The Magazine of Fantasy & Science Fiction	
1977	Alice Sheldon*	"The Screwfly Solution"	Analog Science Fact & Fiction	
1977	Edward Bryant	"Particle Theory"	Analog Science Fact & Fiction	
1977	Fritz Leiber	"A Rite of Spring"	Universe 7 (Doubleday)	
1977	George R. R. Martin	"The Stone City"	New Voices in Science Fiction (Macmillan Publishers)	
1977	Carter Scholz	"The Ninth Symphony of Ludwig van Beethoven and Other Lost Songs"	Universe 7 (Ace Books)	
1978	Charles L. Grant*	"A Glow of Candles, a Unicorn's Eye"	Graven Images (Thomas Nelson)	
1978	Orson Scott Card	"Mikal's Songbird"	Analog Science Fact & Fiction	
1978	Dean Ing	"Devil You Don't Know"	Analog Science Fact & Fiction	
1979	George R. R. Martin*	"Sandkings"	Omni	
1979	Poul Anderson	"The Ways of Love"	Destinies	
1979	Jack Dann	"Camps"	The Magazine of Fantasy & Science Fiction	
1979	Ursula K. Le Guin	"The Pathways of Desire"	New Dimensions 9 (Harper & Row)	
1979	Michael Shea	"The Angel of Death"	The Magazine of Fantasy & Science Fiction	
1979	John Varley	"Options"	Universe 9 (Doubleday)	
1980	Howard Waldrop*	"The Ugly Chickens"	Universe 10 (Doubleday)	
1980	Edward Bryant	"Strata"	The Magazine of Fantasy & Science Fiction	
1980	Stephen King	"The Way Station"	The Magazine of Fantasy & Science Fiction	
1980	Michael Swanwick	"The Feast of Saint Janis"	New Dimensions 11 (Pocket Books)	
1980	Michael Swanwick	"Ginungagap"	TriQuarterly	
1980	John Varley	"Beatnik Bayou"	New Voices 3 (Berkley Books)	
1981	Michael Bishop*	"The Quickening"	Universe 11 (Doubleday)	
1981	Mildred Downey Broxon	"Sea Changeling"	Asimov's Science Fiction	
1981	Edward Bryant	"The Thermals of August"	The Magazine of Fantasy & Science Fiction	
1981	Parke Godwin	"The Fire When It Comes"	The Magazine of Fantasy & Science Fiction	
1981	Michael Swanwick	"Mummer Kiss"	Universe 11 (Doubleday)	
1981	James Tiptree, Jr.	"Lirios: A Tale of the Quintana Roo"	Asimov's Science Fiction	
1982	Connie Willis*	"Fire Watch"	Asimov's Science Fiction	
1982	J. G. Ballard	"Myths of the Near Future"	The Magazine of Fantasy & Science Fiction	
1982	Thomas M. Disch	"Understanding Human Behavior"	The Magazine of Fantasy & Science Fiction	
1982	William Gibson	"Burning Chrome"	Omni	
1982	Joanna Russ	"The Mystery of the Young Gentleman"	Speculations (Houghton Mifflin)	
1982	Bruce Sterling	"Swarm"	The Magazine of Fantasy & Science Fiction	
1983	Greg Bear*	"Blood Music"	Analog Science Fact & Fiction	
1983	Jack Dann	"Blind Shemmy"	Omni	
1983	George R. R. Martin	"The Monkey Treatment"	The Magazine of Fantasy & Science Fiction	
1983	Kim Stanley Robinson	"Black Air"	The Magazine of Fantasy & Science Fiction	
1983	Bruce Sterling	"Cicada Queen"	Universe 13 (Doubleday)	
1983	Ian Watson	"Slow Birds"	The Magazine of Fantasy & Science Fiction	
1983	Connie Willis	"The Sidon in the Mirror"	Asimov's Science Fiction	
1984	Octavia E. Butler*	"Bloodchild"	Asimov's Science Fiction	
1984	Jack Dann	"Bad Medicine"	Asimov's Science Fiction	
1984	James Patrick Kelly	"Saint Theresa of the Aliens"	Asimov's Science Fiction	
1984	Kim Stanley Robinson	"The Lucky Strike"	Universe 14 (Doubleday)	
1984	Lucius Shepard	"The Man Who Painted the Dragon Griaule"	The Magazine of Fantasy & Science Fiction	
1984	Michael Swanwick	"Trojan Horse"	Omni	
1985	George R. R. Martin*	"Portraits of His Children"	Asimov's Science Fiction	
1985	Michael Bishop	"A Gift from the GrayLanders"	Asimov's Science Fiction	
1985	Orson Scott Card	"The Fringe"	The Magazine of Fantasy & Science Fiction	
1985	Harlan Ellison	"Paladin of the Lost Hour"	Universe 15 (Doubleday)	
1985	Michael Swanwick	"Dogfight"	Omni	
1985	William Gibson	"Dogfight"	Omni	
1985	Lucius Shepard	"The Jaguar Hunter"	The Magazine of Fantasy & Science Fiction	
1985	S. C. Sykes	"Rockabye Baby"	Analog Science Fact & Fiction	
1986	Kate Wilhelm*	"The Girl Who Fell into the Sky"	Asimov's Science Fiction	
1986	Orson Scott Card	"Hatrack River"	Asimov's Science Fiction	
1986	Suzy McKee Charnas	"Listening to Brahms"	Omni	
1986	William Gibson	"The Winter Market"	Stardate	
1986	Judith Moffett	"Surviving"	The Magazine of Fantasy & Science Fiction	
1986	Lucius Shepard	"Aymara"	Asimov's Science Fiction	
1986	Roger Zelazny	"Permafrost"	Omni	
1987	Pat Murphy*	"Rachel in Love"	Asimov's Science Fiction	
1987	Octavia E. Butler	"The Evening and the Morning and the Night"	Omni	
1987	Ursula K. Le Guin	"Buffalo Gals, Won't You Come Out Tonight"	Fantasy & Science Fiction	
1987	Bruce McAllister	"Dream Baby"	Asimov's Science Fiction	
1987	Bruce Sterling	"Flowers of Edo"	Asimov's Science Fiction	
1987	Connie Willis	"Schwarzschild Radius"	The Universe (Bantam Spectra)	
1988	George Alec Effinger*	"Schrödinger's Kitten"	Omni	
1988	Neal Barrett, Jr.	"Ginny Sweethips' Flying Circus"	Asimov's Science Fiction	
1988	Steven Gould	"Peaches for Mad Molly"	Analog Science Fact & Fiction	
1988	Ian McDonald	"Unfinished Portrait of the King of Pain by Van Gogh"	Empire Dreams (Bantam Spectra)	
1988	Judith Moffett	"The Hob"	Asimov's Science Fiction	
1988	Mike Resnick	"Kirinyaga"	Fantasy & Science Fiction	
1988	Howard Waldrop	"Do Ya, Do Ya, Wanna Dance?"	Asimov's Science Fiction	
1989	Connie Willis*	"At the Rialto"	Omni	
1989	Greg Bear	"Sisters"	Tangents (Warner Books)	
1989	Megan Lindholm	"Silver Lady and the Fortyish Man"	Asimov's Science Fiction	
1989	Mike Resnick	"For I Have Touched the Sky"	Fantasy & Science Fiction	
1989	Kristine Kathryn Rusch	"Fast Cars"	Asimov's Science Fiction	
1989	Robert Silverberg	"Enter a Soldier. Later: Enter Another"	Asimov's Science Fiction	
1990	Ted Chiang*	"Tower of Babylon"	Omni	
1990	Dafydd ab Hugh	"The Coon Rolled Down and Ruptured His Larinks, A Squeezed Novel by Mr. Skunk"	Asimov's Science Fiction	
1990	Ursula K. Le Guin	"The Shobies' Story"	Universe 1 (Doubleday)	
1990	Ian R. MacLeod	"1/72nd Scale"	Weird Tales	
1990	Mike Resnick	"The Manamouki"	Asimov's Science Fiction	
1990	Kristine Kathryn Rusch	"A Time for Every Purpose"	Amazing Stories	
1990	Susan Shwartz	"Loose Cannon"	What Might Have Been? Vol. 2: Alternate Heroes (Bantam Spectra)	
1990	Martha Soukup	"Over the Long Haul"	Amazing Stories	
1991	Michael Conner*	"Guide Dog"	Fantasy & Science Fiction	
1991	Ray Aldridge	"Gate of Faces"	Fantasy & Science Fiction	
1991	Karen Joy Fowler	"Black Glass"	Full Spectrum 3 (Doubleday)	
1991	Lucius Shepard	"The All-Consuming"	Playboy	
1991	Robert Frazier	"The All-Consuming"	Playboy	
1991	James Patrick Kelly	"Standing In Line with Mister Jimmy"	Asimov's Science Fiction	
1991	Jonathan Lethem	"The Happy Man"	Asimov's Science Fiction	
1991	Susan Shwartz	"Getting Real"	Newer York (New American Library)	
1992	Pamela Sargent*	"Danny Goes to Mars"	Asimov's Science Fiction	
1992	Gregory Benford	"Matter's End"	Full Spectrum 3 (Doubleday)	
1992	S. N. Dyer	"The July Ward"	Asimov's Science Fiction	
1992	Carolyn Ives Gilman	"The Honeycrafters"	Fantasy & Science Fiction	
1992	Susan Shwartz	"Suppose They Gave a Peace..."	Alternate Presidents (Tor Books)	
1992	Walter Jon Williams	"Prayers on the Wind"	When the Music's Over (Bantam Spectra)	
1993	Charles Sheffield*	"Georgia on My Mind"	Analog Science Fiction and Fact	
1993	Terry Bisson	"England Underway"	Omni	
1993	Janet Kagan	"The Nutcracker Coup"	Asimov's Science Fiction	
1993	John Kessel	"The Franchise"	Asimov's Science Fiction	
1993	Martha Soukup	"Things Not Seen"	Analog Science Fiction and Fact	
1993	Connie Willis	"Death on the Nile"	Asimov's Science Fiction	
1994	David Gerrold*	"The Martian Child"	Fantasy & Science Fiction	
1994	Terry Bisson	"Necronauts"	Playboy	
1994	Nina Kiriki Hoffman	"The Skeleton Key"	Fantasy & Science Fiction	
1994	Geoffrey A. Landis	"The Singular Habits of Wasps"	Analog Science Fiction and Fact	
1994	Ursula K. Le Guin	"The Matter of Seggri"	Crank!	
1994	Maureen F. McHugh	"Nekropolis"	Asimov's Science Fiction	
1995	Ursula K. Le Guin*	"Solitude"	Fantasy & Science Fiction	
1995	Dale Bailey	"The Resurrection Man's Legacy"	Fantasy & Science Fiction	
1995	Michael G. Coney	"Tea and Hamsters"	Fantasy & Science Fiction	
1995	Esther M. Friesner	"Jesus at the Bat"	Fantasy & Science Fiction	
1995	Nina Kiriki Hoffman	"Home for Christmas"	Fantasy & Science Fiction	
1995	James Patrick Kelly	"Think Like a Dinosaur"	Asimov's Science Fiction	
1995	Mike Resnick	"When the Old Gods Die"	Asimov's Science Fiction	
1996	Bruce Holland Rogers*	"Lifeboat on a Burning Sea"	Fantasy & Science Fiction	
1996	John M. Ford	"Erase/Record/Play"	Starlight 1 (Tor Books)	
1996	George Guthridge	"Mirror of Lop Nor"	Peter S. Beagle's Immortal Unicorn (HarperPrism)	
1996	Paul Levinson	"The Chronology Protection Case"	Analog Science Fiction and Fact	
1996	Harry Turtledove	"Must and Shall"	Asimov's Science Fiction	
1996	Robert Charles Wilson	"The Perseids"	Realms of Fantasy	
1996	Dave Wolverton	"After a Lean Winter"	Fantasy & Science Fiction	
1997	Nancy Kress*	"The Flowers of Aulit Prison"	Asimov's Science Fiction	
1997	Eleanor Arnason	"The Dog's Story"	Asimov's Science Fiction	
1997	James Alan Gardner	"Three Hearings on the Existence of Snakes in the Human Bloodstream"	Asimov's Science Fiction	
1997	Bill Johnson	"We Will Drink a Fish Together..."	Asimov's Science Fiction	
1997	John Kessel	"The Miracle of Ivar Avenue"	Asimov's Science Fiction	
1997	Paul Levinson	"The Copyright Notice Case"	Analog Science Fiction and Fact	
1997	William Sanders	"The Undiscovered"	Asimov's Science Fiction	
1998	Jane Yolen*	"Lost Girls"	Realms of Fantasy	
1998	Gregory Feeley	"The Truest Chill"	Science Fiction Age	
1998	Ellen Klages	"Time Gypsy"	Bending the Landscape: Science Fiction (The Overlook Press)	
1998	Mark J. McGarry	"The Mercy Gate"	Fantasy & Science Fiction	
1998	Kristine Kathryn Rusch	"Echea"	Asimov's Science Fiction	
1998	Walter Jon Williams	"Lethe"	Asimov's Science Fiction	
1999	Mary A. Turzillo*	"Mars Is No Place for Children"	Science Fiction Age	
1999	Phyllis Eisenstein	"The Island in the Lake"	Fantasy & Science Fiction	
1999	Esther M. Friesner	"How to Make Unicorn Pie"	Fantasy & Science Fiction	
1999	Brian A. Hopkins	"Five Days in April"	Chiaroscuro	
1999	Stanley Schmidt	"Good Intentions"	Fantasy & Science Fiction	
1999	Jack McDevitt	"Good Intentions"	Fantasy & Science Fiction	
1999	Bruce Sterling	"Taklamakan"	Asimov's Science Fiction	
2000	Walter Jon Williams*	"Daddy's World"	Not of Woman Born (New American Library)	
2000	Eleanor Arnason	"Stellar Harvest"	Asimov's Science Fiction	
2000	Gardner Dozois	"A Knight of Ghosts and Shadows"	Asimov's Science Fiction	
2000	Greer Ilene Gilman	"Jack Daw's Pack"	Century	
2000	Mike Moscoe	"A Day's Work on the Moon"	Analog Science Fiction and Fact	
2000	Bruce Holland Rogers	"How the Highland People Came to Be"	Realms of Fantasy	
2000	Stanley Schmidt	"Generation Gap"	Artemis	
2001	Kelly Link*	"Louise's Ghost"	Stranger Things Happen (Small Beer Press)	
2001	Amy Sterling Casil	"To Kiss the Star"	Fantasy & Science Fiction	
2001	Andy Duncan	"The Pottawatomie Giant"	Sci Fiction	
2001	James Patrick Kelly	"Undone"	Asimov's Science Fiction	
2001	James Morrow	"Auspicious Eggs"	Fantasy & Science Fiction	
2001	William Shunn	"Dance of the Yellow-Breasted Luddites"	Vanishing Acts (Tor Books)	
2002	Ted Chiang*	"Hell Is the Absence of God"	Starlight 3 (Tor Books)	
2002	M. Shayne Bell	"The Pagodas of Ciboure"	The Green Man: Tales From the Mythic Forest (Viking Press)	
2002	Richard Bowes	"The Ferryman's Wife"	Fantasy & Science Fiction	
2002	Gregory Frost	"Madonna of the Maquiladora"	Asimov's Science Fiction	
2002	Allen Steele	"The Days Between"	Asimov's Science Fiction	
2002	Charles Stross	"Lobsters"	Asimov's Science Fiction	
2003	Jeffrey Ford*	"The Empire of Ice Cream"	Sci Fiction	
2003	Richard Bowes	"The Mask of the Rex"	Fantasy & Science Fiction	
2003	Adam-Troy Castro	"Of a Sweet Slow Dance in the Wake of Temporary Dogs"	Imaginings: An Anthology of Long Short Fiction (Pocket Books)	
2003	Cory Doctorow	"0wnz0red"	Salon	
2003	Ray Vukcevich	"The Wages of Syntax"	Sci Fiction	
2004	Ellen Klages*	"Basement Magic"	Fantasy & Science Fiction	
2004	Andy Duncan	"Zora and the Zombie"	Sci Fiction	
2004	Christopher Rowe	"The Voluntary State"	Sci Fiction	
2004	William Sanders	"Dry Bones"	Asimov's Science Fiction	
2004	Lois Tilton	"The Gladiator's War: A Dialogue"	Asimov's Science Fiction	
2005	Kelly Link*	"The Faery Handbag"	The Faery Reel: Tales from the Twilight Realm (Viking Press)	
2005	Daniel Abraham	"Flat Diane"	Fantasy & Science Fiction	
2005	James Patrick Kelly	"Men Are Trouble"	Asimov's Science Fiction	
2005	Eileen Gunn	"Nirvana High"	Stable Strategies and Others (Tachyon Publications)	
2005	Leslie What	"Nirvana High"	Stable Strategies and Others (Tachyon Publications)	
2005	Paolo Bacigalupi	"The People of Sand and Slag"	Fantasy & Science Fiction	
2006	Peter S. Beagle*	"Two Hearts"	Fantasy & Science Fiction	
2006	Christopher Barzak	"The Language of Moths"	Realms of Fantasy	
2006	Delia Sherman	"Walpurgis Afternoon"	Fantasy & Science Fiction	
2006	M. Rickert	"Journey into the Kingdom"	Fantasy & Science Fiction	
2006	Vonda N. McIntyre	"Little Faces"	Sci Fiction	
2007	Ted Chiang*	"The Merchant and the Alchemist's Gate"	Fantasy & Science Fiction	
2007	Robin Wayne Bailey	"The Children's Crusade"	Heroes in Training (DAW Books)	
2007	Terry Bramlett	"Child, Maiden, Woman, Crone"	Jim Baen's Universe	
2007	Kij Johnson	"The Evolution of Trickster Stories Among the Dogs of North Park After the Change"	The Coyote Road: Trickster Tales (Viking Press)	
2007	Nancy Kress	"Safeguard"	Asimov's Science Fiction	
2007	Delia Sherman	"The Fiddler of Bayou Teche"	The Coyote Road: Trickster Tales (Viking Press)	
2007	Geoff Ryman	"Pol Pot's Beautiful Daughter (Fantasy)"	Fantasy & Science Fiction	
2008	John Kessel*	"Pride and Prometheus"	Fantasy & Science Fiction	
2008	Richard Bowes	"If Angels Fight"	Fantasy & Science Fiction	
2008	James Alan Gardner	"The Ray-Gun: A Love Story"	Asimov's Science Fiction	
2008	Lisa Goldstein	"Dark Rooms"	Asimov's Science Fiction	
2008	Mary Rosenblum	"Night Wind"	Lace and Blade (Leda)	
2008	Johanna Sinisalo	"Baby Doll"	The SFWA European Hall of Fame (Tor Books)	
2008	K. D. Wentworth	"Kaleidoscope"	Fantasy & Science Fiction	
2009	Eugie Foster*	"Sinner, Baker, Fabulist, Priest; Red Mask, Black Mask, Gentleman, Beast"	Interzone	
2009	Paolo Bacigalupi	"The Gambler"	Fast Forward 2 (Pyr)	
2009	Michael Bishop	"Vinegar Peace, or the Wrong-Way Used-Adult Orphanage"	Asimov's Science Fiction	
2009	Richard Bowes	"I Needs Must Part, the Policeman Said"	Fantasy & Science Fiction	
2009	Ted Kosmatka	"Divining Light"	Asimov's Science Fiction	
2009	Rachel Swirsky	"A Memory of Wind"	Tor.com	
2010	Eric James Stone*	"That Leviathan, Whom Thou Hast Made"	Analog Science Fiction and Fact	
2010	Christopher Barzak	"Map of Seventeen"	The Beastly Bride (Viking Press)	
2010	Aliette de Bodard	"The Jaguar House, in Shadow"	Asimov's Science Fiction	
2010	Christopher Kastensmidt	"The Fortuitous Meeting of Gerard van Oost and Oludara"	Realms of Fantasy	
2010	James Patrick Kelly	"Plus or Minus"	Asimov's Science Fiction	
2010	Shweta Narayan	"Pishaach"	The Beastly Bride (Viking Press)	
2010	Caroline M. Yoachim	"Stone Wall Truth"	Asimov's Science Fiction	
2011	Geoff Ryman*	"What We Found"	Fantasy & Science Fiction	
2011	Rachel Swirsky	"Fields of Gold"	Eclipse 4 (Night Shade Books)	
2011	Brad R. Torgersen	"Ray of Light"	Analog Science Fiction and Fact	
2011	Ferrett Steinmetz	"Sauerkraut Station"	Giganotosaurus	
2011	Charlie Jane Anders	"Six Months, Three Days"	Tor.com	
2011	Katherine Sparrow	"The Migratory Pattern of Dancers"	Giganotosaurus	
2011	Jake Kerr	"The Old Equations"	Lightspeed	
2012	Andy Duncan*	"Close Encounters"	The Pottawatomie Giant & Other Stories (PS Publishing)	
2012	Catherine Asaro	"The Pyre of New Day"	The Mammoth Books of SF Wars (Robinson)	
2012	Ken Liu	"The Waves"	Asimov's Science Fiction	
2012	Lee Mandelo	"The Finite Canvas"	Tor.com	
2012	Meghan McCarron	"Swift, Brutal Retaliation"	Tor.com	
2012	Rachel Swirsky	"Portrait of Lisane da Patagnia"	Tor.com	
2012	Catherynne M. Valente	"Fade to White"	Clarkesworld Magazine	
2013	Aliette de Bodard*	"The Waiting Stars"	The Other Half of the Sky (Candlemark & Gleam)	
2013	Christopher Barzak	"Paranormal Romance"	Lightspeed	
2013	Alaya Dawn Johnson	"They Shall Salt the Earth with Seeds of Glass"	Asimov's Science Fiction	
2013	Henry Lien	"Pearl Rehabilitative Colony for Ungrateful Daughters"	Asimov's Science Fiction	
2013	Ken Liu	"The Litigation Master and the Monkey King"	Lightspeed	
2013	Sarah Pinsker	"In Joy, Knowing the Abyss Behind"	Strange Horizons	
2014	Alaya Dawn Johnson*	"A Guide to the Fruits of Hawai'i"	Fantasy & Science Fiction	
2014	Richard Bowes	"Sleep Walking Now and Then"	Tor.com	
2014	Tom Crosshill	"The Magician and Laplace's Demon"	Clarkesworld Magazine	
2014	Carmen Maria Machado	"The Husband Stitch"	Granta	
2014	Sam J. Miller	"We Are the Cloud"	Lightspeed	
2014	Kai Ashante Wilson	"The Devil in America"	Tor.com	
2015	Sarah Pinsker*	"Our Lady of the Open Road"	Asimov's Science Fiction	
2015	Brooke Bolander	"And You Shall Know Her by the Trail of Dead"	Lightspeed	
2015	Tamsyn Muir	"The Deepwater Bride"	Fantasy & Science Fiction	
2015	Rose Lemberg	"Grandmother-nai-Laylit's Cloth of Winds"	Beneath Ceaseless Skies	
2015	Henry Lien	"The Ladies' Aquatic Gardening Society"	Asimov's Science Fiction	
2015	Michael Bishop	"Rattlesnakes and Men"	Asimov's Science Fiction	
2016	William Ledbetter*	"The Long Fall Up"	Fantasy & Science Fiction	
2016	Sarah Pinsker	"Sooner or Later Everything Falls into the Sea"	Lightspeed	
2016	Jason Sanford	"Blood Grains Speak Through Memories"	Beneath Ceaseless Skies	
2016	Bonnie Jo Stufflebeam	"The Orangery"	Beneath Ceaseless Skies	
2016	Fran Wilde	The Jewel and Her Lapidary	Tor.com Publishing	
2016	Alyssa Wong	"You'll Surely Drown Here If You Stay"	Uncanny Magazine	
2017	Kelly Robson*	"A Human Stain"	Tor.com	
2017	Richard Bowes	"Dirty Old Town"	Fantasy & Science Fiction	
2017	Jonathan P. Brazee	"Weaponized Math"	The Expanding Universe, Volume 3 (LMBPN Publishing)	
2017	Sarah Pinsker	"Wind Will Rove"	Asimov's Science Fiction	
2017	Vina Jie-Min Prasad	"A Series of Steaks"	Clarkesworld Magazine	
2017	K. M. Szpara	"Small Changes Over Long Periods of Time"	Uncanny Magazine	
2018	Brooke Bolander*	The Only Harmless Great Thing	Tor.com Publishing	
2018	Andy Duncan	"An Agent of Utopia"	An Agent of Utopia (Small Beer Press)	
2018	Tina Connolly	"The Last Banquet of Temporal Confections"	Tor.com	
2018	Yudhanjaya Wijeratne	"Messenger"	The Expanding Universe, Volume 4 (LMBPN Publishing)	
2018	R.R. Virdi	"Messenger"	The Expanding Universe, Volume 4 (LMBPN Publishing)	
2018	Lawrence M. Schoen	"The Rule of Three"	Future Science Fiction Digest	
2018	José Pablo Iriarte	"The Substance of My Lives, the Accidents of Our Births"	Lightspeed	
2019	Cat Rambo*	Carpe Glitter	Meerkat Press	
2019	G. V. Anderson	"A Strange Uncertain Light"	Fantasy & Science Fiction	
2019	Siobhan Carroll	"For He Can Creep"	Tor.com	
2019	Mimi Mondal	"His Footsteps, Through Darkness and Light"	Tor.com	
2019	Sarah Pinsker	"The Blur in the Corner of Your Eye"	Uncanny Magazine	
2019	Caroline M. Yoachim	"The Archronology of Love"	Lightspeed	
2020	Sarah Pinsker*	"Two Truths and a Lie"	Tor.com	
2020	Leah Cypess	"Stepsister"	Fantasy & Science Fiction	
2020	Meg Elison	"The Pill"	Big Girl (PM Press)	
2020	A. T. Greenblatt	"Burn or the Episodic Life of Sam Wells as a Super"	Uncanny Magazine	
2020	Bonnie Jo Stufflebeam	"Where You Linger"	Uncanny Magazine	
2020	Caroline M. Yoachim	"Shadow Prisons"	Broad Reach Publishing	
2021	Oghenechovwe Donald Ekpeki*	"O2 Arena"	Galaxy's Edge	
2021	PH Lee	"Just Enough Rain"	GigaNotoSaurus	
2021	Lauren Ring	"(emet)"	Fantasy & Science Fiction	
2021	John Wiswell	"That Story Isn't the Story"	Uncanny Magazine	
2021	Caroline M. Yoachim	"Colors of the Immortal Palette"	Uncanny Magazine	
2022	John Chu*	"If You Find Yourself Speaking to God, Address God with the Informal You"	Uncanny Magazine	
2022	Wole Talabi	"A Dream of Electric Mothers"	Africa Risen (Tor Books)	
2022	S. L. Huang	"Murder by Pixel: Crime and Responsibility in the Digital Darkness"	Clarkesworld Magazine	
2022	Natalia Theodoridou	"The Prince of Salt and the Ocean's Bargain"	Uncanny Magazine	
2022	S. B. Divya	"Two Hands, Wrapped in Gold"	Uncanny Magazine	
2022	Marie Vibbert	"We Built This City"	Clarkesworld Magazine	
2023	Naomi Kritzer*	"The Year Without Sunshine"	Uncanny Magazine	
2023	Renan Bernardo	"A Short Biography of a Conscious Chair"	Samovar	
2023	Ai Jiang	I Am AI	Shortwave Publishing	
2023	Angela Liu	"Imagine: Purple-Haired Girl Shooting Down the Moon"	Clarkesworld Magazine	
2023	Wole Talabi	"Saturday's Song"	Lightspeed	
2023	Eugenia Triantafyllou	"Six Versions of My Brother Found Under the Bridge"	Uncanny Magazine	
2024	A. W. Prihandita*	"Negative Scholarship on the Fifth State of Being"	Clarkesworld Magazine	
2024	Angela Liu	"Another Girl Under the Iron Bell"	Uncanny Magazine	
2024	Thomas Ha	"The Brotherhood of Montague St. Video"	Clarkesworld Magazine	
2024	Eugenia Triantafyllou	"Joanna's Bodies"	Psychopomp	
2024	Christine Hanolsy	"Katya Vasilievna and the Second Drowning of Baba Rechka"	Beneath Ceaseless Skies	
2024	Eugenia Triantafyllou	"Loneliness Universe"	Uncanny Magazine	
2024	Aimee Ogden	"What Any Dead Thing Wants"	Psychopomp	
2025	Thomas Ha*	"Uncertain Sons"	Uncertain Sons and Other Stories (Undertow Publications)	
2025	Marie Croke	"Our Echoes Drifting Through the Marsh"	Beneath Ceaseless Skies	
2025	Somto Ihezue	"We Begin Where Infinity Ends"	Clarkesworld Magazine	
2025	Wen-Yi Lee	The Name Ziya	Tor Books	
2025	H. H. Pak	"Never Eaten Vegetables"	Clarkesworld Magazine	
2025	Eugenia Triantafyllou	"The Life and Times of Alavira the Great as Written by Titos Pavlou and Reviewed by Two Lifelong Friends"	Uncanny Magazine	

== See also ==
- Hugo Award for Best Novelette
