= Hugo Award for Best Novelette =

Annual award for science fiction or fantasy stories

- Awarded for: The best science fiction or fantasy story of between 7,500 and 17,500 words published in the prior calendar year
- Presented by: World Science Fiction Society
- First award: 1955
- Most recent winner: H.H. Pak ("Never Eaten Vegetables")
- Website: thehugoawards.org

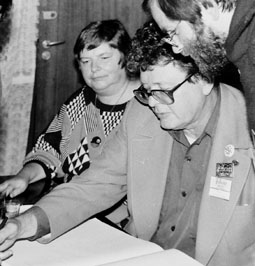
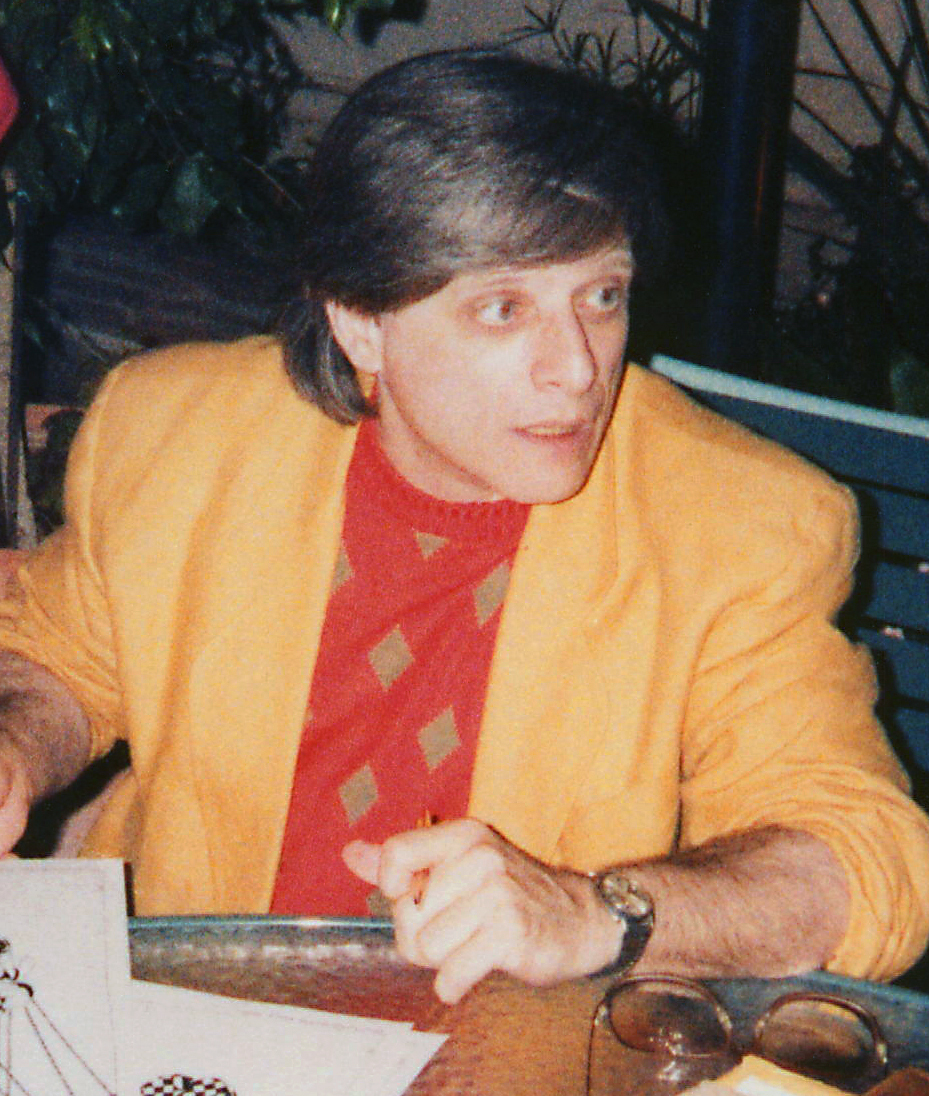
Poul Anderson (left, pictured in 1985) and Harlan Ellison (right, pictured in 1986) each won the award three times.

The Hugo Award for Best Novelette is one of the Hugo Awards given each year for science fiction or fantasy stories published or translated into English during the previous calendar year. The novelette award is available for works of fiction of between 7,500 and 17,500 words; awards are also given out in the short story, novella and novel categories. The Hugo Awards have been described as "a fine showcase for speculative fiction" and "the best known literary award for science fiction writing".

The Hugo Award for Best Novelette was first awarded in 1955, and was subsequently awarded in 1956 and 1959, lapsing in 1960. (Note: In the 1958 awards, a category was called "Best Novel or Novelette", with the winner as the novel The Big Time. No novella category was presented that year.) The category was reinstated for 1967 through 1969, before lapsing again in 1970; after returning in 1973, it has remained to date. In addition to the regular Hugo awards, between 1996 and 2025 Retrospective Hugo Awards or "Retro-Hugos" were available for works published 50, 75, or 100 years prior. Retro-Hugos could only be awarded for years after 1939 in which no awards were originally given. Retro-Hugos were given for novelettes for 1939, 1941, 1943–1946, 1951, and 1954.

Hugo Award nominees and winners are chosen by supporting or attending members of the annual World Science Fiction Convention, or Worldcon, and the award presentation constitutes its central event. The selection process is defined in the World Science Fiction Society Constitution as instant-runoff voting with six finalists, except in the case of a tie. The novelettes on the ballot are the six most-nominated by members that year, with no limit on the number of stories that can be nominated. Initial nominations are made by members in January through March, while voting on the ballot of six finalists is performed roughly in April through July, subject to change depending on when that year's Worldcon is held. Prior to 2017, the final ballot was five works; it was changed that year to six, with each initial nominator limited to five nominations. Worldcons are generally held near the start of September, and are held in a different city around the world each year.

During the 68 nomination years, 219 authors have had works as finalists; 53 of these have won, including coauthors and Retro Hugos. Three translators have been noted along with the author of a novelette written in a language other than English: Lia Belt for a translation from Dutch in 2015, Ken Liu for a translation from Chinese in 2016, and Emily Jen for a translation from Chinese in 2024. Poul Anderson, Isaac Asimov, and Harlan Ellison each have received the most Hugos for Best Novelette at three, with Ellison having been a finalist a total of six times, while seven other authors have won twice. Mike Resnick has had the most final ballot nominations at eight, and Ursula K. Le Guin and Greg Egan have been nominated seven times each. Sixteen other authors have been nominated at least four times, while Egan has the most nominations without winning.

== Winners and finalists ==
In the following table, the years correspond to the date of the ceremony, rather than when the novelette was first published. Each year links to the corresponding "year in literature". Entries with a yellow background have won the award; those with a grey background are the finalists on the short-list. If the novelette was originally published in a book with other stories rather than by itself or in a magazine, the publisher's name is included after the book title.

* Winners and joint winners

Winners and finalists
Year	Author(s)	Novelette	Publisher or publication	Ref.
1955	Walter M. Miller, Jr.*	"The Darfsteller"	Astounding Science-Fiction	
1956	Murray Leinster*	"Exploration Team"	Astounding Science-Fiction	
1956	L. Sprague de Camp	"A Gun for Dinosaur"	Galaxy Science Fiction	
1956	Alan Nourse	"Brightside Crossing"	Galaxy Science Fiction	
1956	Henry Kuttner	"Home There's No Returning"	No Boundaries (Ballantine Books)	
1956	C. L. Moore	"Home There's No Returning"	No Boundaries (Ballantine Books)	
1956	Eric Frank Russell	"Legwork"	Astounding Science-Fiction	
1956	F. L. Wallace	"The Assistant Self"	Fantastic Universe	
1956	Algis Budrys	"The End of Summer"	Astounding Science-Fiction	
1956	Theodore Sturgeon	"Who?"	Galaxy Science Fiction	
1959	Clifford D. Simak*	"The Big Front Yard"	Astounding Science-Fiction	
1959	Pauline Ashwell	"Unwillingly to School"	Astounding Science-Fiction	
1959	Zenna Henderson	"Captivity"	The Magazine of Fantasy & Science Fiction	
1959	C.M. Kornbluth	"Reap the Dark Tide" (aka: "Shark Ship")	Vanguard	
1959	Fritz Leiber	"A Deskful of Girls"	The Magazine of Fantasy & Science Fiction	
1959	Katherine MacLean and Charles V. De Vet	"Second Game"	Astounding Science-Fiction	
1959	Rog Phillips	"Rat in the Skull"	If	
1959	Jack Vance	"The Miracle-Workers"	Astounding Science-Fiction	
1967	Jack Vance*	"The Last Castle"	Galaxy Science Fiction	
1967	Gordon R. Dickson	"Call Him Lord"	Analog Science Fact & Fiction	
1967	Robert M. Green, Jr.	"Apology to Inky"	The Magazine of Fantasy & Science Fiction	
1967	Charles L. Harness	"The Alchemist"	Analog Science Fact & Fiction	
1967	Charles L. Harness	"An Ornament to His Profession"	Analog Science Fact & Fiction	
1967	Hayden Howard	"The Eskimo Invasion"	Galaxy Science Fiction	
1967	Thomas Burnett Swann	"The Manor of Roses"	The Magazine of Fantasy & Science Fiction	
1967	Roger Zelazny	"For a Breath I Tarry"	Fantastic	
1967	Roger Zelazny	"This Moment of the Storm"	The Magazine of Fantasy & Science Fiction	
1968	Fritz Leiber*	"Gonna Roll the Bones"	Dangerous Visions (Doubleday)	
1968	Andre Norton	"Wizard's World"	If	
1968	Philip K. Dick	"Faith of Our Fathers"	Dangerous Visions (Doubleday)	
1968	Harlan Ellison	"Pretty Maggie Moneyeyes"	Knight	
1969	Poul Anderson*	"The Sharing of Flesh"	Galaxy Science Fiction	
1969	Brian Aldiss	"Total Environment"	Galaxy Science Fiction	
1969	Piers Anthony	"Getting Through University"	If	
1969	Richard Wilson	"Mother to the World"	Orbit #3 (G. P. Putnam's Sons)	
1973	Poul Anderson*	"Goat Song"	The Magazine of Fantasy & Science Fiction	
1973	William Rotsler	"Patron of the Arts"	Universe #2 (Bantam Spectra)	
1973	Harlan Ellison	"Basilisk"	The Magazine of Fantasy & Science Fiction	
1973	Gardner Dozois	"A Kingdom by the Sea"	Orbit #10 (G. P. Putnam's Sons)	
1973	James Tiptree, Jr.	"Painwise"	The Magazine of Fantasy & Science Fiction	
1974	Harlan Ellison*	"The Deathbird"	The Magazine of Fantasy & Science Fiction	
1974	Vonda N. McIntyre	"Of Mist, and Grass, and Sand"	Analog Science Fact & Fiction	
1974	James Tiptree, Jr.	"Love Is the Plan the Plan Is Death"	The Alien Condition (Ballantine Books)	
1974	George Alec Effinger	"The City on the Sand"	The Magazine of Fantasy & Science Fiction	
1974	Jerry Pournelle	"He Fell into a Dark Hole"	Analog Science Fact & Fiction	
1975	Harlan Ellison*	"Adrift Just Off the Islets of Langerhans: Latitude 38° 54' N, Longitude 77° 00' 13" W"	The Magazine of Fantasy & Science Fiction	
1975	Isaac Asimov	"—That Thou art Mindful of Him"	The Magazine of Fantasy & Science Fiction	
1975	Fritz Leiber	"Midnight by the Morphy Watch"	If	
1975	Richard A. Lupoff	"After the Dreamtime"	New Dimensions #4 (Doubleday)	
1975	Jerry Pournelle	"Extreme Prejudice"	Analog Science Fact & Fiction	
1975	William Walling	"Nix Olympica"	Analog Science Fact & Fiction	
1975	Kate Wilhelm	"A Brother to Dragons, a Companion of Owls"	Orbit #14 (G. P. Putnam's Sons)	
1976	Larry Niven*	"The Borderland of Sol"	Analog Science Fact & Fiction	
1976	Ursula K. Le Guin	"The New Atlantis"	The New Atlantis (Warner Books)	
1976	George R. R. Martin	"And Seven Times Never Kill Man"	Analog Science Fact & Fiction	
1976	Tom Reamy	"San Diego Lightfoot Sue"	The Magazine of Fantasy & Science Fiction	
1976	Jerry Pournelle	"Tinker"	Galaxy Science Fiction	
1977	Isaac Asimov*	"The Bicentennial Man"	Stellar #2 (Ballantine Books)	
1977	Ursula K. Le Guin	"The Diary of the Rose"	Future Power (Random House)	
1977	John Varley	"Gotta Sing, Gotta Dance"	Galaxy Science Fiction	
1977	John Varley	"The Phantom of Kansas"	Galaxy Science Fiction	
1978	Joan D. Vinge*	"Eyes of Amber"	Analog Science Fact & Fiction	
1978	Orson Scott Card	"Ender's Game"	Analog Science Fact & Fiction	
1978	James Tiptree, Jr.	"The Screwfly Solution"	Analog Science Fact & Fiction	
1978	Samuel R. Delany	"Prismatica"	The Magazine of Fantasy & Science Fiction	
1978	Carter Scholz	"The Ninth Symphony of Ludwig van Beethoven and Other Lost Songs"	Universe #7 (Bantam Spectra)	
1979	Poul Anderson*	"Hunter's Moon"	Analog Science Fact & Fiction	
1979	Orson Scott Card	"Mikal's Songbird"	Analog Science Fact & Fiction	
1979	Thomas Disch	"The Man Who Had No Idea"	The Magazine of Fantasy & Science Fiction	
1979	Dean Ing	"Devil You Don't Know"	Analog Science Fact & Fiction	
1979	John Varley	"The Barbie Murders"	Asimov's Science Fiction	
1980	George R. R. Martin*	"Sandkings"	Omni	
1980	Barry B. Longyear	"Homecoming"	Asimov's Science Fiction	
1980	Larry Niven	"The Locusts"	Analog Science Fact & Fiction	
1980	Vonda N. McIntyre	"Fireflood"	The Magazine of Fantasy & Science Fiction	
1980	John Varley	"Options"	Universe #9 (Bantam Spectra)	
1980	Christopher Priest	"Palely Loitering"	The Magazine of Fantasy & Science Fiction	
1981	Gordon R. Dickson*	"The Cloak and the Staff"	Analog Science Fact & Fiction	
1981	Barry B. Longyear	"Savage Planet"	Analog Science Fact & Fiction	
1981	John Varley	"Beatnik Bayou"	New Voices #3: The Campbell Award Nominees (Berkley Books)	
1981	Keith Roberts	"The Lordly Ones"	The Magazine of Fantasy & Science Fiction	
1981	Michael Shea	"The Autopsy"	The Magazine of Fantasy & Science Fiction	
1981	Howard Waldrop	"The Ugly Chickens"	Universe #10 (Bantam Spectra)	
1982	Roger Zelazny*	"Unicorn Variation"	Asimov's Science Fiction	
1982	George R. R. Martin	"Guardians"	Analog Science Fact & Fiction	
1982	Edward Bryant	"The Thermals of August"	The Magazine of Fantasy & Science Fiction	
1982	Parke Godwin	"The Fire When It Comes"	The Magazine of Fantasy & Science Fiction	
1982	Michael Bishop	"The Quickening"	Universe #11 (Bantam Spectra)	
1983	Connie Willis*	"Fire Watch"	Asimov's Science Fiction	
1983	Phyllis Eisenstein	"Nightlife"	The Magazine of Fantasy & Science Fiction	
1983	Timothy Zahn	"Pawn's Gambit"	Analog Science Fact & Fiction	
1983	S. P. Somtow	"Aquila"	Asimov's Science Fiction	
1983	Bruce Sterling	"Swarm"	The Magazine of Fantasy & Science Fiction	
1984	Greg Bear*	"Blood Music"	Analog Science Fact & Fiction	
1984	George R. R. Martin	"The Monkey Treatment"	The Magazine of Fantasy & Science Fiction	
1984	Connie Willis	"The Sidon in the Mirror"	Asimov's Science Fiction	
1984	Ian Watson	"Slow Birds"	The Magazine of Fantasy & Science Fiction	
1984	Kim Stanley Robinson	"Black Air"	The Magazine of Fantasy & Science Fiction	
1985	Octavia E. Butler*	"Bloodchild"	Asimov's Science Fiction	
1985	Lucius Shepard	"The Man Who Painted the Dragon Griaule"	The Magazine of Fantasy & Science Fiction	
1985	Timothy Zahn	"Return to the Fold"	Analog Science Fact & Fiction	
1985	Connie Willis	"Blued Moon"	Asimov's Science Fiction	
1985	Hilbert Schenck	"Silicon Muse"	Analog Science Fact & Fiction	
1985	Eric Vinicoff	"The Weigher"	Analog Science Fact & Fiction	
1985	Kim Stanley Robinson	"The Lucky Strike"	Universe #14 (Bantam Spectra)	
1986	Harlan Ellison*	"Paladin of the Lost Hour"	Universe #15 (Bantam Spectra)	
1986	George R. R. Martin	"Portraits of His Children"	Asimov's Science Fiction	
1986	Orson Scott Card	"The Fringe"	The Magazine of Fantasy & Science Fiction	
1986	Michael Bishop	"A Gift from the GrayLanders"	Asimov's Science Fiction	
1986	Michael Swanwick	"Dogfight"	Omni	
1986	William Gibson	"Dogfight"	Omni	
1987	Roger Zelazny*	"Permafrost"	Omni	
1987	David Brin	"Thor Meets Captain America"	The Magazine of Fantasy & Science Fiction	
1987	William Gibson	"The Winter Market"	Stardate	
1987	Orson Scott Card	"Hatrack River"	Asimov's Science Fiction	
1987	Vernor Vinge	"The Barbarian Princess"	Analog Science Fact & Fiction	
1988	Ursula K. Le Guin*	"Buffalo Gals, Won't You Come Out Tonight"	Fantasy & Science Fiction	
1988	Pat Murphy	"Rachel in Love"	Asimov's Science Fiction	
1988	Walter Jon Williams	"Dinosaurs"	Asimov's Science Fiction	
1988	Bruce Sterling	"Flowers of Edo"	Asimov's Science Fiction	
1988	Bruce McAllister	"Dream Baby"	Asimov's Science Fiction	
1989	George Alec Effinger*	"Schrödinger's Kitten"	Omni	
1989	Steven Gould	"Peaches for Mad Molly"	Analog Science Fact & Fiction	
1989	Howard Waldrop	"Do Ya, Do Ya, Wanna Dance?"	Asimov's Science Fiction	
1989	Harlan Ellison	"The Function of Dream Sleep"	Midnight Graffiti	
1989	Neal Barrett, Jr.	"Ginny Sweethips' Flying Circus"	Asimov's Science Fiction	
1990	Robert Silverberg*	"Enter a Soldier. Later: Enter Another"	Asimov's Science Fiction	
1990	Mike Resnick	"For I Have Touched the Sky"	Fantasy & Science Fiction	
1990	George Alec Effinger	"Everything But Honor"	Asimov's Science Fiction	
1990	Connie Willis	"At the Rialto"	Omni	
1990	Nancy Kress	"The Price of Oranges"	Asimov's Science Fiction	
1990	Orson Scott Card	"Dogwalker"	Asimov's Science Fiction	
1991	Mike Resnick*	"The Manamouki"	Asimov's Science Fiction	
1991	Charles Sheffield	"A Braver Thing"	Asimov's Science Fiction	
1991	Ted Chiang	"Tower of Babylon"	Omni	
1991	Dafydd ab Hugh	"The Coon Rolled Down and Ruptured His Larinks, A Squeezed Novel by Mr. Skunk"	Asimov's Science Fiction	
1991	Martha Soukup	"Over the Long Haul"	Amazing Stories	
1992	Isaac Asimov*	"Gold"	Analog Science Fact & Fiction	
1992	Pat Cadigan	"Dispatches from the Revolution"	Asimov's Science Fiction	
1992	Connie Willis	"Miracle"	Asimov's Science Fiction	
1992	Howard Waldrop	"Fin de Cyclé"	Night of the Cooters: More Neat Stories (Mark V. Ziesing)	
1992	Ted Chiang	"Understand"	Asimov's Science Fiction	
1993	Janet Kagan*	"The Nutcracker Coup"	Asimov's Science Fiction	
1993	Pamela Sargent	"Danny Goes to Mars"	Asimov's Science Fiction	
1993	Pat Cadigan	"True Faces"	Fantasy & Science Fiction	
1993	Susan Shwartz	"Suppose They Gave a Peace..."	Alternate Presidents (Tor Books)	
1993	Barry N. Malzberg	"In the Stone House"	Alternate Kennedys (Tor Books)	
1994	Charles Sheffield*	"Georgia on My Mind"	Analog Science Fiction and Fact	
1994	Nancy Kress	"Dancing on Air"	Asimov's Science Fiction	
1994	Terry Bisson	"The Shadow Knows"	Asimov's Science Fiction	
1994	Bruce Sterling	"Deep Eddy"	Asimov's Science Fiction	
1994	John Kessel	"The Franchise"	Asimov's Science Fiction	
1995	David Gerrold*	"The Martian Child"	Fantasy & Science Fiction	
1995	Greg Egan	"Cocoon"	Asimov's Science Fiction	
1995	Mike Resnick	"A Little Knowledge"	Asimov's Science Fiction	
1995	Ursula K. Le Guin	"Solitude"	Fantasy & Science Fiction	
1995	Geoffrey A. Landis	"The Singular Habits of Wasps"	Analog Science Fiction and Fact	
1995	Ursula K. Le Guin	"The Matter of Seggri"	Crank	
1996	James Patrick Kelly*	"Think Like a Dinosaur"	Asimov's Science Fiction	
1996	Mike Resnick	"When the Old Gods Die"	Asimov's Science Fiction	
1996	Allen Steele	"The Good Rat"	Analog Science Fiction and Fact	
1996	Harry Turtledove	"Must and Shall"	Asimov's Science Fiction	
1996	Greg Egan	"Luminous"	Asimov's Science Fiction	
1996	Greg Egan	"TAP"	Asimov's Science Fiction	
1997	Bruce Sterling*	"Bicycle Repairman"	Intersections (Tor Books)	
1997	Mike Resnick	"The Land of Nod"	Asimov's Science Fiction	
1997	Ursula K. Le Guin	"Mountain Ways"	Asimov's Science Fiction	
1997	Suzy McKee Charnas	"Beauty and the Opéra or The Phantom Beast"	Asimov's Science Fiction	
1997	William Barton	"Age of Aquarius"	Asimov's Science Fiction	
1998	Bill Johnson*	"We Will Drink a Fish Together..."	Asimov's Science Fiction	
1998	James Alan Gardner	"Three Hearings on the Existence of Snakes in the Human Bloodstream"	Asimov's Science Fiction	
1998	Stephen Baxter	"Moon Six"	SF Age	
1998	Michael A. Burstein	"Broken Symmetry"	Analog Science Fiction and Fact	
1998	William Sanders	"The Undiscovered"	Asimov's Science Fiction	
1999	Bruce Sterling*	"Taklamakan"	Asimov's Science Fiction	
1999	Kristine Kathryn Rusch	"Echea"	Asimov's Science Fiction	
1999	Allen Steele	"Zwarte Piet's Tale"	Analog Science Fiction and Fact	
1999	Nancy Kress	"Steamship Soldier on the Information Front"	Future Histories (Horizon House)	
1999	Greg Egan	"The Planck Dive"	Asimov's Science Fiction	
1999	Ellen Klages	"Time Gypsy"	Bending the Landscape: Science Fiction (The Overlook Press)	
1999	Robert Charles Wilson	"Divided by Infinity"	Starlight #2 (Tor Books)	
2000	James Patrick Kelly*	"10^{16} to 1"	Asimov's Science Fiction	
2000	Eleanor Arnason	"Stellar Harvest"	Asimov's Science Fiction	
2000	Greg Egan	"Border Guards"	Interzone	
2000	Jan Jensen	"The Secret History of the Ornithopter"	Fantasy & Science Fiction	
2000	Tom Purdom	"Fossil Games"	Asimov's Science Fiction	
2000	Ian R. MacLeod	"The Chop Girl"	Asimov's Science Fiction	
2001	Kristine Kathryn Rusch*	"Millennium Babies"	Asimov's Science Fiction	
2001	Stephen Baxter	"On the Orion Line"	Asimov's Science Fiction	
2001	Allen Steele	"Agape Among the Robots"	Analog Science Fiction and Fact	
2001	Stanley Schmidt	"Generation Gap"	Artemis	
2001	Mike Resnick	"Redchapel"	Asimov's Science Fiction	
2002	Ted Chiang*	"Hell Is the Absence of God"	Starlight #3 (Tor Books)	
2002	Allen Steele	"The Days Between"	Asimov's Science Fiction	
2002	James Patrick Kelly	"Undone"	Asimov's Science Fiction	
2002	Charles Stross	"Lobsters"	Asimov's Science Fiction	
2002	Shane Tourtellotte	"The Return of Spring"	Analog Science Fiction and Fact	
2003	Michael Swanwick*	"Slow Life"	Analog Science Fiction and Fact	
2003	Ursula K. Le Guin	"The Wild Girls"	Asimov's Science Fiction	
2003	Charles Stross	"Halo"	Asimov's Science Fiction	
2003	Maureen F. McHugh	"Presence"	Fantasy & Science Fiction	
2003	Gregory Frost	"Madonna of the Maquiladora"	Asimov's Science Fiction	
2004	Michael Swanwick*	"Legions in Time"	Asimov's Science Fiction	
2004	Jeffrey Ford	"The Empire of Ice Cream"	Scifi.com	
2004	Charles Stross	"Nightfall"	Asimov's Science Fiction	
2004	Jay Lake	"Into the Gardens of Sweet Night"	Writers of the Future #19 (Galaxy Press)	
2004	James Patrick Kelly	"Bernardo's House"	Asimov's Science Fiction	
2004	Robert Reed	"Hexagons"	Asimov's Science Fiction	
2005	Kelly Link*	"The Faery Handbag"	The Faery Reel (Viking Publishers)	
2005	Michael F. Flynn	"The Clapping Hands of God"	Analog Science Fiction and Fact	
2005	Paolo Bacigalupi	"The People of Sand and Slag"	Fantasy & Science Fiction	
2005	Benjamin Rosenbaum	"Biographical Notes to 'A Discourse on the Nature of Causality, with Airplanes', by Benjamin Rosenbaum"	All-Star Zeppelin Adventure Stories (Wheatland Press)	
2005	Christopher Rowe	"The Voluntary State"	Scifi.com	
2006	Peter S. Beagle*	"Two Hearts"	Fantasy & Science Fiction	
2006	Paolo Bacigalupi	"The Calorie Man"	Fantasy & Science Fiction	
2006	Michael A. Burstein	"TelePresence"	Analog Science Fiction and Fact	
2006	Cory Doctorow	"I, Robot"	The Infinite Matrix	
2006	Howard Waldrop	"The King of Where-I-Go"	Scifi.com	
2007	Ian McDonald*	"The Djinn's Wife"	Asimov's Science Fiction	
2007	Geoff Ryman	"Pol Pot's Beautiful Daughter"	Fantasy & Science Fiction	
2007	Michael F. Flynn	"Dawn, and Sunset, and the Colours of the Earth"	Asimov's Science Fiction	
2007	Mike Resnick	"All the Things You Are"	Jim Baen's Universe	
2007	Paolo Bacigalupi	"Yellow Card Man"	Asimov's Science Fiction	
2008	Ted Chiang*	"The Merchant and the Alchemist's Gate"	Fantasy & Science Fiction	
2008	Daniel Abraham	"The Cambist and Lord Iron: a Fairytale of Economics"	Logorrhea (Bantam Books)	
2008	Greg Egan	"Dark Integers"	Asimov's Science Fiction	
2008	Greg Egan	"Glory"	The New Space Opera (Eos)	
2008	David Moles	"Finisterra"	Fantasy & Science Fiction	
2009	Elizabeth Bear*	"Shoggoths in Bloom"	Asimov's Science Fiction	
2009	John Kessel	"Pride and Prometheus"	Fantasy & Science Fiction	
2009	James Alan Gardner	"The Ray-Gun: A Love Story"	Asimov's Science Fiction	
2009	Paolo Bacigalupi	"The Gambler"	Fast Forward 2 (Pyr)	
2009	Mike Resnick	"Alastair Baffle's Emporium of Wonders"	Asimov's Science Fiction	
2010	Peter Watts*	"The Island"	The New Space Opera #2 (Eos)	
2010	Rachel Swirsky	"Eros, Philia, Agape"	Tor.com	
2010	Nicola Griffith	"It Takes Two"	Eclipse #3 (Night Shade Books)	
2010	Paul Cornell	"One of Our Bastards is Missing"	The Solaris Book of New Science Fiction #3 (Solaris Books)	
2010	Charles Stross	"Overtime"	Tor.com	
2010	Eugie Foster	"Sinner, Baker, Fabulist, Priest; Red Mask, Black Mask, Gentleman, Beast"	Interzone	
2011	Allen Steele*	"The Emperor of Mars"	Asimov's Science Fiction	
2011	Sean McMullen	"Eight Miles"	Analog Science Fiction and Fact	
2011	Aliette de Bodard	"The Jaguar House, in Shadow"	Asimov's Science Fiction	
2011	Eric James Stone	"That Leviathan, Whom Thou Hast Made"	Analog Science Fiction and Fact	
2011	James Patrick Kelly	"Plus or Minus"	Asimov's Science Fiction	
2012	Charlie Jane Anders*	"Six Months, Three Days"	Tor.com	
2012	Paul Cornell	"The Copenhagen Interpretation"	Asimov's Science Fiction	
2012	Rachel Swirsky	"Fields of Gold"	Eclipse #4 (Night Shade Books)	
2012	Brad R. Torgersen	"Ray of Light"	Analog Science Fiction and Fact	
2012	Geoff Ryman	"What We Found"	Fantasy & Science Fiction	
2013	Pat Cadigan*	"The Girl-Thing Who Went Out for Sushi"	Edge of Infinity (Solaris Books)	
2013	Thomas Olde Heuvelt	"The Boy Who Cast No Shadow"	Postscripts: Unfit For Eden (PS Publishing)	
2013	Catherynne M. Valente	"Fade to White"	Clarkesworld Magazine	
2013	Seanan McGuire	"In Sea-Salt Tears"	Self-published	
2013	Seanan McGuire	"Rat-Catcher"	A Fantasy Medley 2 (Subterranean Press)	
2014	Mary Robinette Kowal*	"The Lady Astronaut of Mars"	Tor.com	
2014	Vox Day	"Opera Vita Aeterna"	The Last Witchking (Marcher Lord Hinterlands)	
2014	Brad R. Torgersen	"The Exchange Officers"	Analog Science Fiction and Fact	
2014	Ted Chiang	"The Truth of Fact, the Truth of Feeling"	Subterranean Magazine	
2014	Aliette de Bodard	"The Waiting Stars"	The Other Half of the Sky (Candlemark & Gleam)	
2015	Thomas Olde Heuvelt (Dutch)* (Note: Thomas Olde Heuvelt's 2015 winner "The Day the World Turned Upside Down" and Hao Jingfang's 2016 winner "Folding Beijing" are the only translated works to win the "Best Novelette" Hugo. Hugos were awarded to both the author and the translator.)	"The Day The World Turned Upside Down"	Lightspeed	
2015	Lia Belt (translator)*	"The Day The World Turned Upside Down"	Lightspeed	
2015	Michael F. Flynn	"The Journeyman: In the Stone House"	Analog Science Fiction and Fact	
2015	Edward M. Lerner	"Championship B’tok"	Analog Science Fiction and Fact	
2015	Gray Rinehart	"Ashes to Ashes, Dust to Dust, Earth to Alluvium"	Orson Scott Card's InterGalactic Medicine Show	
2015	Rajnar Vajra	"The Triple Sun: A Golden Age Tale"	Analog Science Fiction and Fact	
2016	Hao Jingfang (Chinese)*	"Folding Beijing"*	Uncanny Magazine	
2016	Ken Liu (translator)*	"Folding Beijing"*	Uncanny Magazine	
2016	Brooke Bolander	"And You Shall Know Her by the Trail of Dead"	Lightspeed	
2016	Cheah Kai Wai	"Flashpoint: Titan"	There Will Be War Volume X (Castalia House)	
2016	Stephen King	"Obits"	The Bazaar of Bad Dreams (Charles Scribner's Sons)	
2016	David VanDyke	"What Price Humanity?"	There Will Be War Volume X (Castalia House)	
2017	Ursula Vernon*	"The Tomato Thief"	Apex Magazine	
2017	Stix Hiscock	Alien Stripper Boned from Behind by the T-Rex	Self-published	
2017	Nina Allan	"The Art of Space Travel"	Tor.com	
2017	Fran Wilde	"The Jewel and Her Lapidary"	Tor.com	
2017	Carolyn Ives Gilman	"Touring with the Alien"	Clarkesworld Magazine	
2017	Alyssa Wong	"You'll Surely Drown Here If You Stay"	Uncanny Magazine	
2018	Suzanne Palmer*	"The Secret Life of Bots"	Clarkesworld Magazine	
2018	Aliette de Bodard	"Children of Thorns, Children of Water"	Uncanny Magazine	
2018	Yoon Ha Lee	"Extracurricular Activities"	Tor.com	
2018	Vina Jie-Min Prasad	"A Series of Steaks"	Clarkesworld Magazine	
2018	K. M. Szpara	"Small Changes Over Long Periods of Time"	Uncanny Magazine	
2018	Sarah Pinsker	"Wind Will Rove"	Asimov's Science Fiction	
2019	Zen Cho*	"If at First You Don't Succeed, Try, Try Again"	B&N Sci-Fi and Fantasy Blog	
2019	Tina Connolly	"The Last Banquet of Temporal Confections"	Tor.com	
2019	Daryl Gregory	"Nine Last Days on Planet Earth"	Tor.com	
2019	Brooke Bolander	"The Only Harmless Great Thing"	Tor.com Publishing	
2019	Naomi Kritzer	"The Thing About Ghost Stories"	Uncanny Magazine	
2019	Simone Heller	"When We Were Starless"	Clarkesworld Magazine	
2020	N. K. Jemisin*	Emergency Skin	Amazon.com	
2020	Caroline M. Yoachim	"The Archronology of Love"	Lightspeed Magazine	
2020	Sarah Gailey	"Away With the Wolves"	Uncanny Magazine	
2020	Sarah Pinsker	"The Blur in the Corner of Your Eye"	Uncanny Magazine	
2020	Siobhan Carroll	"For He Can Creep"	Tor.com	
2020	Ted Chiang	"Omphalos"	Exhalation: Stories (Alfred A. Knopf)	
2021	Sarah Pinsker*	Two Truths and a Lie	Tor.com	
2021	A. T. Greenblatt	"Burn, or the Episodic Life of Sam Wells as a Super"	Uncanny Magazine	
2021	Isabel Fall	"Helicopter Story"	Clarkesworld Magazine	
2021	Aliette de Bodard	"The Inaccessibility of Heaven"	Uncanny Magazine	
2021	Naomi Kritzer	"Monster"	Clarkesworld Magazine	
2021	Meg Elison	"The Pill"	Big Girl (PM Press)	
2022	Suzanne Palmer*	"Bots of the Lost Ark"	Clarkesworld Magazine	
2022	Caroline M. Yoachim	"Colors of the Immortal Palette"	Uncanny Magazine	
2022	Catherynne M. Valente	"L'Esprit de L'Escalier"	Tor.com	
2022	Oghenechovwe Donald Ekpeki	"O2 Arena"	Galaxy's Edge	
2022	John Wiswell	"That Story Isn't the Story"	Uncanny Magazine	
2022	Fran Wilde	"Unseelie Brothers, Ltd."	Uncanny Magazine	
2023	Hai Ya*	"The Space-Time Painter"	Galaxy's Edge	
2023	Catherynne M. Valente	"The Difference Between Love and Time"	Someone in Time: Tales of Time-Crossed Romance (Solaris Books)	
2023	Wole Talabi	"A Dream of Electric Mothers"	Africa Risen: A New Era of Speculative Fiction (Tordotcom)	
2023	John Chu	"If You Find Yourself Speaking to God, Address God with the Informal You"	Uncanny Magazine	
2023	S. L. Huang	"Murder By Pixel: Crime and Responsibility in the Digital Darkness"	Clarkesworld Magazine	
2023	Marie Vibbert	"We Built This City"	Clarkesworld Magazine	
2024	Naomi Kritzer*	"The Year Without Sunshine"	Uncanny Magazine	
2024	Ai Jiang	I AM AI	Shortwave Publishing	
2024	Gu Shi (Chinese)	"Introduction to 2181 Overture, Second Edition"	Clarkesworld Magazine	
2024	Emily Jen (translator)	"Introduction to 2181 Overture, Second Edition"	Clarkesworld Magazine	
2024	C. L. Polk	"Ivy, Angelica, Bay"	Tor.com	
2024	Nghi Vo	"On the Fox Roads"	Tor.com	
2024	Sarah Pinsker	"One Man's Treasure"	Uncanny Magazine	
2025	Naomi Kritzer*	"The Four Sisters Overlooking the Sea"	Asimov's Science Fiction	
2025	Thomas Ha	"The Brotherhood of Montague St. Video"	Clarkesworld Magazine	
2025	Premee Mohamed	"By Salt, By Sea, By Light of Stars"	Strange Horizons	
2025	Ann Leckie	"Lake of Souls"	Lake of Souls (Orbit Books)	
2025	Eugenia Triantafyllou	"Loneliness Universe"	Uncanny Magazine	
2025	Sarah Pinsker	"Signs of Life"	Uncanny Magazine	
2026	H.H. Pak*	"Never Eaten Vegetables"	Clarkesworld Magazine	
2026	Scott Lynch	"Kaiju Agonistes"	Uncanny Magazine	
2026	Martha Wells	"Rapport: Friendship, Solidarity, Communion, Empathy"	Reactor	
2026	Cameron Reed	"The Girl That My Mother Is Leaving Me For"	Reactor	
2026	Sarah Pinsker	"The Millay Illusion"	Uncanny Magazine	
2026	Catherynne M. Valente	"When He Calls Your Name"	Uncanny Magazine	

=== Retro Hugos ===
Between the 1996 Worldcon and 2025 Worldcon, the World Science Fiction Society had the concept of "Retro-Hugos", in which the Hugo award could be retroactively awarded for 50, 75, or 100 years prior. Retro-Hugos could only be awarded for years after 1939 (the year of the first Worldcon) in which no Hugos were originally awarded. Retro-Hugos were awarded eight times, for 1939, 1941, 1943–1946, 1951, and 1954.

Retro Hugo winners and nominees
Year	Year awarded	Author(s)	Novelette	Publisher or publication	Ref.
1939	2014	Clifford D. Simak*	"Rule 18"	Astounding Science-Fiction	
1939	2014	John W. Campbell	"Dead Knowledge"	Astounding Stories	
1939	2014	Henry Kuttner	"Hollywood on the Moon"	Thrilling Wonder Stories	
1939	2014	Robert E. Howard	"Pigeons from Hell"	Weird Tales	
1939	2014	C. L. Moore	"Werewoman"	Leaves	
1941	2016	Robert A. Heinlein*	"The Roads Must Roll"	Astounding Science Fiction	
1941	2016	Robert A. Heinlein	"Blowups Happen"	Astounding Science Fiction	
1941	2016	Jack Williamson	"Darker Than You Think"	Unknown	
1941	2016	Harry Bates	"Farewell to the Master"	Astounding Science Fiction	
1941	2016	Theodore Sturgeon	"It!"	Unknown	
1943	2018	Isaac Asimov*	"Foundation" (aka "The Encyclopedists")	Astounding Science Fiction	
1943	2018	Isaac Asimov	"Bridle and Saddle" (aka "The Mayors")	Astounding Science Fiction	
1943	2018	Robert A. Heinlein (as Anson MacDonald)	"Goldfish Bowl"	Astounding Science Fiction	
1943	2018	Fredric Brown	"The Star Mouse"	Planet Stories	
1943	2018	C. L. Moore	"There Shall Be Darkness"	Astounding Science Fiction	
1943	2018	A. E. van Vogt	"The Weapon Shop"	Astounding Science Fiction	
1944	2019	C. L. Moore* (as Lewis Padgett)	"Mimsy Were the Borogoves"	Astounding Science-Fiction	
1944	2019	Henry Kuttner* (as Lewis Padgett)	"Mimsy Were the Borogoves"	Astounding Science-Fiction	
1944	2019	Leigh Brackett	"Citadel of Lost Ships"	Planet Stories	
1944	2019	Leigh Brackett	"The Halfling"	Astonishing Stories	
1944	2019	Henry Kuttner (as Lewis Padgett)	"The Proud Robot"	Astounding Science-Fiction	
1944	2019	Eric Frank Russell	"Symbiotica"	Astounding Science-Fiction	
1944	2019	Fritz Leiber	"Thieves' House"	Unknown Worlds	
1945	2020	Clifford D. Simak*	"City"	Astounding Science-Fiction	
1945	2020	Fredric Brown	"Arena"	Astounding Science-Fiction	
1945	2020	Isaac Asimov	"The Big and the Little" ("The Merchant Princes")	Astounding Science-Fiction	
1945	2020	C. L. Moore (as Lawrence O'Donnell)	"The Children's Hour"	Astounding Science-Fiction	
1945	2020	Henry Kuttner (as Lawrence O'Donnell)	"The Children's Hour"	Astounding Science-Fiction	
1945	2020	C. L. Moore	"No Woman Born"	Astounding Science-Fiction	
1945	2020	C. L. Moore (as Lewis Padgett)	"When the Bough Breaks"	Astounding Science-Fiction	
1945	2020	Henry Kuttner (as Lewis Padgett)	"When the Bough Breaks"	Astounding Science-Fiction	
1946	1996	Murray Leinster*	"First Contact"	Astounding Science-Fiction	
1946	1996	Fredric Brown	"Pi in the Sky"	Thrilling Wonder Stories	
1946	1996	Lester del Rey	"Into Thy Hands"	Astounding Science-Fiction	
1946	1996	A. E. van Vogt	"The Mixed Men"	Astounding Science-Fiction	
1946	1996	Lewis Padgett	"The Piper's Son"	Astounding Science-Fiction	
1951	2001	Cyril M. Kornbluth*	"The Little Black Bag"	Astounding Science-Fiction	
1951	2001	Cordwainer Smith	"Scanners Live in Vain"	Fantasy Book	
1951	2001	Poul Anderson	"The Helping Hand"	Astounding Science-Fiction	
1951	2001	James Blish	"Okie"	Astounding Science-Fiction	
1951	2001	Eric Frank Russell	"Dear Devil"	Other Worlds	
1954	2004	James Blish*	"Earthman, Come Home"	Astounding Science-Fiction	
1954	2004	Philip K. Dick	"Second Variety"	Space Science Fiction	
1954	2004	Poul Anderson	"The Adventure of the Misplaced Hound"	Universe	
1954	2004	Poul Anderson	"Sam Hall"	Astounding Science-Fiction	
1954	2004	Theodore Cogswell	"The Wall Around the World"	Beyond Fantasy Fiction	

== See also ==
- Nebula Award for Best Novelette
- List of joint winners of the Hugo and Nebula awards
