= A. W. Prihandita =

Indonesian author

- Born: Indonesia
- Occupations: Author, scholar
- Writing career
- Language: English
- Period: 2023–present
- Genre: Speculative fiction
- Notable awards: 2025 Nebula Award for Best Novelette
- Website: awprihandita.com

Anselma Widha Prihandita is an Indonesian teacher and an author of speculative fiction active in the field since 2023. She writes as A. W. Prihandita.

== Biography ==
Prihandita was raised in Indonesia, which is still her home. She holds a Ph.D. in Language and Rhetoric from the University of Washington, and is a scholar and teacher of rhetoric and composition. She presently teaches and studies on the west coast of the United States. Her fields of research include decolonial theories, transnational writing, and translation studies, among others.

== Writing career ==
Prihandita attended the Odyssey Workshop on its Fresh Voices Scholarship in 2023, and the Clarion Workshop as its Octavia Butler Scholar in 2024.

Her first published short story was "The Kindest, Most Caring Library You've Ever Known" (Writers' Playground, July 2023). Her work has appeared in Cast of Wonders, Clarkesworld, The Dark, Fusion Fragment, Ghoulish Tales, Haven Speculative, Khōréō, Mysterion Online, Nebula Awards Showcase 60, Uncanny Magazine, and Writers' Playground.

Her novelette "Negative Scholarship on the Fifth State of Being" won the 2024 Nebula Award for Best Novelette, was nominated for the 2025 Hugo Award for Best Novelette and 2025 Ignyte Award for Outstanding Novelette, and was a finalist for the 2025 Eugie Award.

== Bibliography ==
=== Short fiction ===
- "The Kindest, Most Caring Library You've Ever Known" (2023)
- "The Cursing of Herman Willem Daendels" (2023)
- "To Fall in Love with a Dying Sun" (2023)
- "The God Who Never Sleeps Dwells Under an Inky Sea" (2024)
- "My Mother's Voice and the Shadow" (2024)
- "Negative Scholarship on the Fifth State of Being" (2024)
- "The Window at My Mother's Back, the Door in My Belly" (2024)
- "In (Future) Memory of an Absent Father" (2024)
- "The Best Way to Survive a Tiger Attack" (2025)
- "The Desolate Order of the Head in the Water" (2026)
- "The Memory Hounds of Bak-Ankham" (2026)
