= That Leviathan, Whom Thou Hast Made =

2010 novelette by Eric James Stone

"That Leviathan, Who Thou Hast Made" is a 2010 science fiction novelette by Eric James Stone. It was first published in Analog Science Fiction.

== Synopsis ==
Harry Malan is the President of a small Mormon ward on a space station at the center of the sun, where the parishioners are all "swales": giant trisexual whale-like aliens made of plasma.

When he learns that swales habitually force smaller swales into sexual activity, and that one of his parishioners is concerned that taking pleasure in being forced was a sin, this leads to conflicts both with Leviathan — the oldest, largest, and most powerful of the swales, who most of the others worship as a god — and with Malan's non-Mormon colleague Juanita Merced, who says that his missionary work is contaminating swale culture.

== Reception ==
"That Leviathan, Whom Thou Hast Made" won the Nebula Award for Best Novelette in 2010, and was a finalist for the 2011 Hugo Award for Best Novelette.

Writing at Tangent Online, Carl Slaughter described the story as "a mixture of very impressive and very unimpressive, very original and very unoriginal", and observed that it lacked "legitimate and essential integration of the alien's nature and activities into the plot", but praised the tension resulting from Leviathan's confrontation with Malan, as well as the use of the tenets of Mormonism in the story's outcome. Writing at Locus, Lois Tilton stated that, although she was disappointed by the story's opening in which Merced "harangues Malan on the sins of interference", she was pleased that Malan and Merced were "reasonable and well-rounded human beings, despite their conflicting viewpoints, who even managed to work together"; as well, she noted that Malan's "sincere faith" succeeded in "mak[ing] [her] sympathize with his religious mission".

James Nicoll found the story to be "dreadful", with "stupendously banal piety" and "many intriguing details a better author would have expanded upon", including that "swale theology and the fact their god is someone with whom one can converse (...) should have provoked more reaction from Malan." Ultimately, Nicoll concluded that it is "very nearly the Platonic ideal of a particular sort of entirely forgettable Analog story: the premise is a bit stupid [and] the execution [is] spared from tedium only by brevity," and posited that its Nebula win may be connected to the fact that Nebula voting uses a first past the post system.

Abigail Nussbaum castigated it as "very, very bad", with "indifferent prose", "dodgy politics", and "cardboard-thin characters" who "seem to have been created either to spout talking points (...) or act as straw men". Nussbaum suggested that the story was effectively a thought experiment about "a situation in which none of the negative associations of Christian missionary work are applicable", such that "it's totally OK to impose Christian values on aliens".

== Origins ==
Stone has described the story as the result of a writing workshop taught by Kristine Kathryn Rusch, Dean Wesley Smith, and Sheila Williams, in which he was challenged to write a story whose protagonist was based on himself, set in the center of the sun, where the problem was "can't get a date".

== Publication history ==
- Analog Science Fiction & Fact, September 2010
- Monsters & Mormons, 2011, Peculiar Pages, October 2011
- Nebula Awards Showcase 2012, Pyre Books, May 2012
- Science Fiction World Translations, January 2012 (Chinese translation)
- ESLI, August 2011 (Russian translation)
- Robot, Summer 2011 (Italian translation)
- StarShipSofa, 21 June 2011 (audio edition)
- Spin, 2012 (Finnish translation)
- Antologia Nebula 2012, Editura Trei, 2013 (Romanian translation)
