= The Djinn's Wife =

"The Djinn's Wife" is a 2006 science fiction short story by British writer Ian McDonald. It was first published in Asimov's Science Fiction.

== Synopsis ==
Esha is a dancer and A.J. Rao is an artificial intelligence embodied in a swarm of nanobots. They get married, but their relationship quickly turns sour.

== Reception ==
"The Djinn's Wife" won the 2007 Hugo Award for Best Novelette and the 2007 BSFA Award for Best Short Fiction.

At Tangent Online, Carole Ann Moleti called it "sumptuous" and "ethereal", noting that it met all the criteria to be considered an example of paranormal romance. At SF Signal, however, John DeNardo considered it a "lackluster reading experience".
