= Hexagons (story) =

"Hexagons" is a 2003 alternate history short story by American writer Robert Reed. It was first published in the magazine Asimov's Science Fiction.

== Synopsis ==
In 1933 in a world where the Roman Empire never fell but converted to Christianity, and India, China, and the Aztec Republic became the world's dominant technological powers, twelve-year-old Samuel Dunlop watches as his father tries to run for office.

== Reception ==
"Hexagons" was a finalist for the 2004 Hugo Award for Best Novelette.

Io9 has noted that, unlike many stories in which the Roman Empire did not fall, "Hexagons" is not "explicitly dystopian".

Tangent Online's Chris Markwyn considered it to be a "compelling" story that is "well-told but fairly conventional", and observed that the contraband history-simulator owned by Samuel's friend's grandfather "undercut" the story's ability to "assert its own reality"; Markwyn further noted that Reed's choice of villain — a "blue-eyed, small-mustached, table-pounding ultra-nationalist who blames his country's problems on the Jews", who is "obviously an analogue of a historical figure" — results in an emphasis on the "artificial, game-like nature of [Reed's] scenario", ultimately detracting from readers' suspension of disbelief.
