= Eugenia Triantafyllou =

Speculative fiction author

- Occupations: Author, artist
- Writing career
- Genre: Speculative fiction
- Website: eugeniatriantafyllou.com

Eugenia Triantafyllou is a Greek speculative fiction author and artist. She writes as Eugenia Triantafyllou, with the exception of a few early works written as Eugenia M. Triantafyllou

== Personal life ==
Triantafyllou has lived in Sweden and in Athens "with a boy and a dog."

== Career ==
Triantafyllou enjoyed drawing as a child, which "led to me joining a small comic artist community in my early 20s and to drawing my own little comics." At twenty-six, feeling a need to develop her storytelling skills, she decided to become a writer. Triantafyllou started writing in English in the 2010s. She is a graduate of Clarion West Writers Workshop. She was co-editor with Nelly Geraldine García-Rosas of the January 2023 issue of Apparition Literary Magazine. Her work has appeared in Apex, Reactor, Strange Horizons, and Uncanny, among other publications.

== Works ==
=== Short fiction ===
- "The Heart Is a Lonesome Hunter" (2017) (as Eugenia M. Triantafyllou)
- "What We Are Moulded After" (2017) (as Eugenia M. Triantafyllou)
- "Cherry Wood Coffin" (2018) (as Eugenia M. Triantafyllou)
- "Worm-Mothers" (?)
- "Ghost Mapping" (2018)
- "We Are Here to Be Held" (2019)
- "April Teeth" (2019)
- "What Cannot Follow" (2019)
- "My Country Is a Ghost" (2020)
- "Those We Serve" (2020)
- "How the Girls Came Home" (2021)
- "The Giants of the Violet Sea" (2021)
- "Tomatoes" (2021)
- "Fish Tale" (2021)
- "This Village" (2022)
- "Bonesoup" (2022)
- "Of the Body" (2022)
- "Harvest of Bones" (2022)
- "Flower, Daughter, Soil, Seed" (2023)
- "Salt Water" (2023)
- "Undog" (2023)
- "Always Be Returning" (2023)
- "Six Versions of My Brother Found Under the Bridge" (2023)
- "Loneliness Universe" (2024)
- "Skinless" (2024)
- "Joanna's Bodies" (2024)
- "Some to Cradle, Some to Eat" (2025)
- "The Bathers" (2025)
- "The Life and Times of Alavira the Great As Written by Titos Pavlou and Reviewed by Two Lifelong Friends" (2025)

== Awards and recognition ==
The author's work has won the British Fantasy and the Shirley Jackson Awards and has been nominated for the British Science Fiction, Hugo, Ignyte, Locus, Nebula, and World Fantasy Awards.

"My Country Is a Ghost" was nominated for the 2021 World Fantasy Award for Best Short Fiction, the 2021 Nebula Award for Best Short Story, and the 2021 Hugo Award for Best Short Story (below the cutoff); it also placed eleventh in the 2021 Locus Award for Best Short Story and was a finalist for the 2021 Ignyte Award for Outstanding Short Story.

"How the Girls Came Home: placed 42nd in the 2022 Locus Award for Best Short Story.

"The Giants of the Violet Sea" was nominated for the 2022 Nebula Award for Best Novella and placed 26th in the 2022 Locus Award for Best Novella.

"Always Be Returning" placed 41st in the 2024 Locus Award for Best Short Story.

"Flower, Daughter, Soil, Seed" placed 32nd in the 2024 Locus Award for Best Short Story.

"Salt Water" placed 29th in the 2024 Locus Award for Best Short Story.

"Six Versions of My Brother Found Under the Bridge" won the 2024 Shirley Jackson Award for Best Novelette, was nominated for the 2024 Nebula Award for Best Novelette and the 2024 Hugo Award for Best Novelette (below the cutoff), and placed tenth in the 2024 Locus Award for Best Novelette.

"Undog" placed thirtieth in the 2024 Locus Award for Best Short Story.

"Joanna's Bodies" was nominated for the 2025 Nebula Award for Best Novelette, the 2025 Ignyte Award for Outstanding Novelette, and the 2025 Hugo Award for Best Novelette (below the cutoff), and placed tenth in the 2025 Locus Award for Best Novelette.

"Loneliness Universe" was nominated for the 2025 Nebula Award for Best Novelette and the 2025 Hugo Award for Best Novelette, and placed fifth in the 2025 Locus Award for Best Novelette.

"The Life and Times of Alavira the Great As Written by Titos Pavlou and Reviewed by Two Lifelong Friends" was nominated for the 2025 BSFA Award for Best Short Fiction and the 2026 Nebula Award for Best Novelette.
