= Negative Scholarship on the Fifth State of Being =

"Negative Scholarship on the Fifth State of Being" is a 2024 science fiction short story by A. W. Prihandita. It was first published in Clarkesworld.

== Synopsis ==
A physician's attempts to treat an alien being are thwarted by medical bureaucracy and inadequate translation.

== Reception ==
"Negative Scholarship on the Fifth State of Being" won the 2024 Nebula Award for Best Novelette and was a finalist for the 2025 Ignyte Award for Best Novelette.

In Locus, A. C. Wise stated that the story "provides a lovely reflection on seeing others for who they are, letting go of preconceptions, and being truly known".
