= Devil You Don't Know =

1978 science fiction short story by Dean Ing

"Devil You Don't Know" is a 1978 science fiction short story by American writer Dean Ing. It was first published in Analog Science Fiction.

== Plot summary ==
Val Clarke looks profoundly retarded, but is actually of normal intelligence, and so she infiltrates psychiatric hospitals in order to expose their abuses with her hidden transmitter and remote partner Christopher Maffei. However, the situation at the latest hospital is far stranger than anyone could have imagined.

== Reception ==
"Devil You Don't Know" was a finalist for the 1978 Nebula Award for Best Novelette, and the 1979 Hugo Award for Best Novelette.

The Science Fiction Research Association noted its merits in terms of "sensitivity to diversity in looks (and) lifestyle".
