= The Wages of Syntax =

- Short story by Ray Vukcevich
- Country: United States
- Language: English

Publication
- Published in: Sci Fiction
- Media type: Online
- Publication date: 2003

"The Wages of Syntax" is a 2003 science fiction short story by Ray Vukcevich. It was first published in Sci Fiction.

== Synopsis ==
Nick Sherwood wants to disprove the "Spontaneous Competence" hypothesis that quantum effects will prevent Henry Wolfe from being killed until he learns Italian.

== Reception ==
"The Wages of Syntax" was a finalist for the 2003 Nebula Award for Best Novelette.

Jay Lake — writing in the Internet Review of Science Fiction — praised the "astonishing transparency" with which Vukcevich presented "changes in tense, person and point of view" (Henry, Nick, and Henry's old lover Sydney), and noted the parallels between "Spontaneous Competence" and Sydney's arrival from Italy to attend a funeral.
