= Fields of Gold (novelette) =

2011 novelette by Rachel Swirsky

"Fields of Gold" is a 2011 fantasy novelette by Rachel Swirsky. It was first published in the Jonathan Strahan-edited anthology "Eclipse Four", and was reprinted in Year's Best Science Fiction and Fantasy: 2012.

== Synopsis ==
Dennis dies and arrives in heaven, where he discovers that what he thought would make him happy may be very different from what will keep him happy in the long term.

== Reception ==
"Fields" was a finalist for the 2012 Hugo Award for Best Novelette, and the Nebula Award for Best Novelette of 2011.

Strange Horizons noted that despite "ostensibly representing the present", the story is "absorbed with the past and the future that awaits us all".
