= The Man of Maybe Half-a-Dozen Faces =

2000 detective novel by Ray Vukcevich

The Man of Maybe Half-a-Dozen Faces is a 2000 detective novel by Ray Vukcevich. It was first published by Thomas Dunne Books.

== Synopsis ==
Skylight Howells is a private investigator with multiple identities and an addiction to tap dancing, both of which are necessary to investigate the disappearance of a man who may have killed several writers of software manuals — or who may be the real killer's next target.

== Reception ==
The SF Site compared the novel to the works of Jonathan Lethem, Robert Anton Wilson, and Philip K. Dick, and praised its mystery aspect, its pacing, and its overall absurdity and silliness. The Pittsburgh Post-Gazette similarly praised the mystery as "well-plotted (...) once you accept the givens about [Howells]", and noted that the novel was "zany, bizarre and very original".

Publishers Weekly considered Howells to be "a clever gimmick", but overall found the book "uneven" and "less than scintillating". Kirkus Reviews judged that although "Vukcevich does have storytelling skills", the novel is "for computer savants only" — and that even then, it may be too bizarre.
