= The Nutcracker Coup =

1992 novelette by Janet Kagan

"The Nutcracker Coup" is a 1992 science fiction short story by Janet Kagan. It was first published in Asimov's Science Fiction.

== Synopsis ==
Human diplomats stationed on the planet Rejoicing teach the porcupine-like natives to revolt against their tyrannical emperor.

== Reception ==
"The Nutcracker Coup" won the 1993 Hugo Award for Best Novelette, and was nominated for the 1993 Nebula Award for Best Novelette.

Ben Jeapes has cited the story as the inspiration for the design of the alien species in his 1998 novel His Majesty's Starship, while observing that its plot is predicated on "upholding the right of all decent Americans to interfere in the affairs of less developed planets if they find the culture un-American or even if they are just plain bored".
