= Fade to White =

- Short story by Catherynne M. Valente
- Language: English
- Genres: Dystopian fiction, science fiction

Publication
- Published in: Clarkesworld Magazine
- Media type: Novelette
- Publication date: August 2012

"Fade to White" is a 2012 dystopian fiction 10,750-word novelette by Catherynne M. Valente. It was originally published in Clarkesworld Magazine issue #71, and reprinted in Valente's 2013 anthology The Melancholy of Mechagirl.

== Synopsis ==
A nuclear war between the United States and the Soviet Union (preceded by an alternate outcome of World War II) has turned huge swathes of the US into irradiated wasteland. The Soviets occupy the western part of the country.

In American society, great effort is taken to maintain a superficially 1950s-style culture despite the struggles to survive. Due to nuclear fallout, agriculture is difficult and many people are infertile, more men than women. At age 15, children take aptitude and fertility tests. Fertile ones are arranged to be married at 19. Each man marries four women, rotates between living with each and maintains a polite fiction of monogamy. The couples are paid stipends and can do make-work. Non-white men and the infertile cannot marry. They are either conscripted as soldiers, or dosed with libido-suppressing drugs and assigned jobs by the government. Homosexuality is tacitly accepted so long as people participate in the system. Some women prefer the new system due to having more independence and job opportunities than before the war.

The story follows two children, Martin and Sylvie. Martin dreams of becoming a father, but fails his fertility test; his fate is left a mystery. Sylvie resents the system and is in love with a black boy, Clark. She also lives in fear of being discovered as quarter-Japanese (her mother is half-Japanese and passing for white) and being deported to Utah. (Note: It's unclear whether Utah is the site of an internment camp, a colony of the Empire of Japan, or simply an area to which Japanese-Americans are exiled.) She gets a high mark on her fertility test, meets Clark one last time and tries to accept her fate.

== Awards ==
Year	Award	Category	Result	Ref.
2012	Nebula Award	Novelette	Finalist	
2012	Sidewise Award	Short Form	Finalist	
2013	Hugo Award	Novelette	Finalist	
