= The Singular Habits of Wasps =

1994 short story by Geoffrey A. Landis

"The Singular Habits of Wasps" is a science fiction/horror story by Geoffrey A. Landis, about Sherlock Holmes. It was first published in Analog Science Fiction, in April 1994.

== Synopsis ==
Sherlock Holmes is mutilating corpses in Whitechapel... but for a reason no one could have suspected.

== Reception ==
"The Singular Habits of Wasps" was a finalist for the Nebula Award for Best Novelette of 1994 and the 1995 Hugo Award for Best Novelette.

Publishers Weekly called it a "stunner". Writing in Locus Online, however, Nick Gevers faulted it as "polished but pointless", and a "curious violation of the spirit of its enterprise". When interviewing Landis for Infinity Plus, Gevers further described it as "pretty improbable [for a Sherlock Holmes pastiche] and thus subversive"; Landis specified that he was "horrified" by the idea that the story could be seen as "contemptuous of Holmes".

== Plagiarism ==
In 2000, the story was published in the magazine Leading Edge, credited to Phillip S. Barcia; Barcia was subsequently identified as a Florida prisoner who had plagiarized at least two other published stories. Leading Edge formally apologized to Landis, paid him standard reprint fees, and physically modified all the printed copies of Leading Edge so as to correctly credit him.
