= The Undiscovered =

1997 short story by William Sanders

"The Undiscovered" is an alternate history short story by William Sanders that won the Sidewise Award for Alternate History. It was originally published in the March 1997 issue of Asimov's and, in addition to its Sidewise Award nomination, was nominated for the Hugo Award, the Nebula Award, and the Theodore Sturgeon Award. It was subsequently reprinted in The Year's Best Science Fiction: Fifteenth Annual Collection, The Best Alternate History Stories of the 20th Century, and Best of the Best: 20 Years of the Year's Best Science Fiction.

== Plot ==
The story is narrated by a Cherokee man in the late 16th century. An English immigrant called Spear-Shaker has been captured by the narrator's tribe, and is essentially adopted by them. Spear-Shaker tries to introduce the concept of stage play to the tribe by producing a version of Hamlet for them, but mutual cultural misunderstandings make this very difficult.
