= Never Eaten Vegetables =

2025 science fiction novelette by H. H. Pak

"Never Eaten Vegetables" is a 2025 science fiction novelette by H. H. Pak. It was first published in Clarkesworld.

== Synopsis ==
NEV-46 is a Natal Embryonic Vessel — a sapient spaceship carrying 10,000 frozen human embryos to a colony planet — which has renamed itself Never Eaten Vegetables. When something goes wrong and 500 of the embryos begin gestating prematurely, Never Eaten Vegetables must choose between 500 babies that it does not fully have the resources to care for, or 9500 embryos. A parallel narrative thread follows Luwa, a politician on the colony planet, as she investigates what happened to Never Eaten Vegetables and why.

== Reception ==
Writing in Locus, A. C. Wise called it "heartbreaking and beautifully written", and drew parallels with Tom Godwin's 1958 story "The Cold Equations".

Year	Award	Category	Result	Ref.
2025	Nebula Award	Novelette	Nominated	
2026	Hugo Award	Novelette	Won	
2026	Ignyte Award	Novelette	Finalist	
