= Pol Pot's Beautiful Daughter =

2006 fantasy story by Geoff Ryman

"Pol Pot's Beautiful Daughter", also known as "Pol Pot's Beautiful Daughter (Fantasy)", is a 2006 fantasy story by Geoff Ryman. It was first published in The Magazine of Fantasy and Science Fiction.

== Synopsis ==
When Pol Pot's 18-year-old daughter Sith returns to Cambodia in 2004, she finds that everything computerized around her is haunted by the ghosts of the victims of the Cambodian genocide — and that this is making it impossible for her to have a relationship.

== Reception ==
Pol Pot's Beautiful Daughter was a finalist for the 2007 Hugo Award for Best Novelette, the 2007 World Fantasy Award—Short Fiction, and the Nebula Award for Best Novelette in 2006.

In the Internet Review of Science Fiction, Lois Tilton expressed unease at the fact that Pol Pot genuinely did have a daughter of that name and age, who "[did] not seem to have lived the sort of self-indulgent, moneyed life" described in Ryman's story; ultimately, Tilton "wonder[ed] what the real Sitha would think of this (...) unauthorized use of her life in a story that is not true to it." Strange Horizons' Matthew Cheney found that "a story about Pol Pot written in what felt like the diction of a fairy tale was too much" for him to tolerate, and noted that he "tried to forget the story's existence altogether" until it began to be discussed online in greater detail.
