= Permafrost (story) =

Novelette by Roger Zelazny

- Short story by Roger Zelazny
- Genre: Science fiction

Publication
- Publisher: Omni
- Publication date: April 1986

"Permafrost" is a science fiction novelette by American writer Roger Zelazny, published in 1986.

== Plot summary ==
On Balfrost, a planet that experiences decades-long seasons, the Playpoint resort attracts tourists during the warm seasons. In winter it is maintained by an artificial intelligence who was once a man, Andrew Aldon, and a pair of custodians, a man and a woman, who are in suspended animation except for a few days each year when they awake to inspect and maintain the resort. The resort has powerful weapons to keep encroaching ice at bay.

Paul Plaige, a former custodian who left under suspicious circumstances, returns in winter with his latest paramour, a woman named Dorothy. His real reason for returning is to retrieve some precious stones lost in a cave-in that claimed his partner, a woman named Glenda.

In the years since Paul's departure, Andrew Aldon has noticed a change in the weather patterns. He believes that the planet is somehow intelligent, as in the Gaia hypothesis. Paul sets out to find the stones, with the weather curiously helping him by maintaining a calm area around him. Later, Dorothy tries to follow with help from Andrew Aldon. Paul comes upon a cave containing Glenda's corpse, somehow preserved. In fact Glenda is still alive, having merged with a biological network present across the planet, and has been controlling the weather. In the confrontation that follows, Dorothy sees Paul with Glenda's re-animated body. Andrew, in touch through Dorothy's wrist communicator, tries to prevent a conflict, but instead Glenda causes his personality to switch places with Paul's.

Andrew and Dorothy leave the planet, while Paul and Glenda act out their hatred for each other with the weapons of Playpoint and the planet's weather.

== References to other works ==
The story opens with a mention of the "frozen carcass of a leopard" on the slopes of Mount Kilimanjaro. This is a reference to the carcass in the story "The Snows of Kilimanjaro" by Ernest Hemingway.

== Reception ==
"Permafrost" won the 1987 Hugo Award for Best Novelette in 1987, and was nominated for the 1986 Nebula Award for Best Novelette.

Mike Ashley has described it as a "complex tale of confrontation".
