= The Ray-Gun: A Love Story =

- Short story by James Alan Gardner
- Language: English
- Genre(s): Science fiction

Publication
- Published in: Asimov's Science Fiction
- Publication type: Magazine
- Publication date: February 2008

"The Ray-Gun: A Love Story" is a science fiction novelette by Canadian writer James Alan Gardner, published in 2008. It won the 2009 Theodore Sturgeon Award. It was nominated for the 2009 Hugo Award for Best Novelette as well as the 2009 Nebula Award for Best Novelette.

== Plot summary ==
The story is about an unpopular teenage boy who finds an alien ray gun in the forest. Although he does not do much with the gun, contemplating its design or use and handling the ray-gun when alone gives his life more direction and purpose. The story has some elements of "coming of age" stories in that it follows an adolescent becoming an adult, PhD student, and ultimately finding love. The ray-gun played a role in the direction of his life in all these things. However, in the end the ray-gun itself is abandoned as too dangerous or no longer needed.
