= Lord of the Fantastic =

1998 anthology edited by Martin H. Greenberg

- First edition
- Author: Edited by Martin H. Greenberg
- Language: English
- Genre: Science fiction/Fantasy anthology
- Publisher: Avon Eos
- Publication date: 1998
- Publication place: United States
- Media type: Print (Paperback)
- ISBN: 978-0-380-80886-1
- OCLC: 43028614

Lord of the Fantastic is a 1998 anthology honoring the work of science fiction writer Roger Zelazny. The title is both a play on his novel Lord of Light and an homage to Zelazny. Many authors and friends of Zelazny's came together to write this book; it includes personal comments by many of the contributors. The book was edited by Martin H. Greenberg.

== Contents ==
- "Introduction" by Fred Saberhagen
- "Lethe" by Walter Jon Williams
- "The Story Roger Never Told" by Jack Williamson
- "The Somehow Not Yet Dead" by Nina Kiriki Hoffman
- "Calling Pittsburgh" by Steven Brust
- "If I Take the Wings of Morning" by Katharine Eliska Kimbriel
- "Ki'rin and the Blue and White Tiger" by Jane Lindskold
- "The Eryx" by Robert Sheckley
- "Southern Discomfort" by Jack C. Haldeman II
- "Suicide Kings" by John J. Miller
- "Changing of the Guard" by Robert Wayne McCoy and Thomas F. Monteleone
- "The Flying Dutchman" by John Varley
- "Ninekiller and the Neterw" by William Sanders
- "Call Me Titan" by Robert Silverberg
- "The Outling" by Andre Norton
- "Arroyo de Oro" by Pati Nagle
- "Back in 'the Real World'" by Bradley H. Sinor
- "Mad Jack" by Jennifer Roberson
- "Movers and Shakers" by Paul Dellinger
- "The Halfway House at the Heart of Darkness" by William Browning Spencer
- "Only the End of the World Again" by Neil Gaiman
- "Slow Symphonies of Mass and Time" by Gregory Benford
- "Asgard Unlimited" by Michael A. Stackpole
- "Wherefore the Rest is Silence" by Gerald Hausman
