= Ray Vukcevich =

American novelist

Ray Vukcevich (born 1946) is an American writer of fantasy and literary fiction. His stories have been compared to the works of R. A. Lafferty, George Saunders, and David Sedaris. Some seventy-five stories, with titles such as "White Guys in Space", have appeared in science fiction and literary magazines. His online novelette "The Wages of Syntax" was a finalist for the 2004 Nebula Award for Best Novelette.

Vukcevich's novel The Man of Maybe Half a Dozen Faces was published by Minotaur Books in 2000. A collection of short stories — Meet Me in the Moon Room — was published in 2001 by Small Beer Press.

Originally from New Mexico, as of 2014 he lives in Eugene, Oregon. He is a member of the Wordos writers' group.

== Bibliography ==
- *The Man of Maybe Half-a-Dozen Faces (2000, novel)
- Meet Me in the Moon Room (2001, collection of short stories)
