= Enter a Soldier. Later: Enter Another =

1989 science fiction story

"Enter a Soldier. Later: Enter Another" is a 1989 science fiction story by Robert Silverberg. It was first published in Asimov's Science Fiction.

== Synopsis ==
When AI researchers attempt to replicate the minds of historical figures, their first success is Francisco Pizarro... who they then introduce to their second success, Socrates.

== Reception ==
"Enter a Soldier. Later: Enter Another" won the 1990 Hugo Award for Best Novelette, and was a finalist for the Nebula Award for Best Novelette in 1990.

The Spanish translation won the 2001 Premio Ignotus for Best Foreign Short Story.

Steven H Silver noted that the story has "little action", but nonetheless raises questions about the philosophical issues discussed not only by Pizarro and Socrates, but also by the researchers.

== Sequels ==
"Enter a Soldier. Later: Enter Another" served as the basis for Time Gate, an anthology of stories by other authors using Silverberg's setting.
