= Midnight by the Morphy Watch =

1974 horror fiction story by Fritz Leiber

"Midnight by the Morphy Watch" is a horror fiction story about chess, written by American author Fritz Leiber. It was first published in If, in July 1974.

The story is one of a series of works by Leiber whose settings are places that he inhabited, and whose protagonists are based on himself.

== Synopsis ==
When amateur chessplayer Stirf Ritter-Rebil (a "quasi-anagrammatic" version of "Fritz Reuter Leiber") purchases the custom-made pocket watch which once belonged to Paul Morphy, his own chess skills are supernaturally boosted — but he also begins to experience side effects.

== Reception ==
"Midnight by the Morphy Watch" was a finalist for the 1975 Hugo Award for Best Novelette, and was ranked ninth in the 1975 Locus Award for Best Short Story. Mike Ashley called it "chilling".
