= Marie Vibbert =

American science fiction author (born 1974)

Marie Lilian Vibbert
- Vibbert at Dragon Con in 2026
- Born: 1974 (age 51–52); East Cleveland, Ohio, U.S.
- Education: Case Western Reserve University (BS)
- Occupations: Novelist; short story author
- Writing career
- Genre: Science fiction
- Website: www.marievibbert.com

Marie Lilian Vibbert (born 1974) is an American science fiction author.

== Background ==
Vibbert was born in East Cleveland, Ohio in 1974, the daughter of a construction worker who was also a professional sculptor and painter. She has a twin sister named Grace.

She received a bachelor's degree in Geology and English from Case Western Reserve University in 1998. She played as a lineman in professional women's football for the Cleveland Fusion team. She works as a programmer at the Freedman Center for Digital Scholarship through University Technology.

Vibbert attended the Clarion Workshop in 2013. and is a member of the Cleveland-based Cajun Sushi Hamsters writing workshop, and an organizer for the Cleveland Game Developers group. She lives with her husband Brian Crick in Cleveland Heights, Ohio.

She, and her twin, are both long-time active members in the Society for Creative Anachronism's Middle Kingdom where Marie Vibbert is known as Lyonnete Vibert. She researches and teaches on topics of the arts, customs and culture of the Middle Ages.

== Writing ==
=== Fiction ===
While she published an early short story, "Brain Trust" in the online magazine Reflection's Edge in February 2006, her significant body of short fiction started to appear after 2013. Her work has appeared in science fiction magazines including Analog Science Fiction, The Magazine of Fantasy and Science Fiction, Daily Science Fiction, and Clarkesworld, and has been reprinted in several anthologies. Her work has been called "the embodiment of what science fiction should be in 2016" by The Oxford Culture Review.

Her debut science fiction novel, Galactic Hellcats appeared in 2021, and was longlisted for the BSFA Award for 2021. Reviews of the book called it "Tongue-in-cheek humor, delightfully absurd (if sometimes over the top) action, and heartening themes of found family keep the pages turning" (Publishers Weekly) and "An interplanetary biker-squad romp that’s less cheesy than the Russ Meyer–esque premise suggests" (Kirkus Reviews). A sequel, Andrei and the Hellcats, appeared from Lethe Press in 2025.

A fantasy novel The Gods Awoke appeared in August, 2022. She also co-authored a thriller MegaDeath with Tory Quinn, appearing in 2022.

Her most recent novel, Multitude, came out from Apex Books in May, 2026.

=== Poetry ===
Vibbert's poetry has appeared in multiple publications, including Asimov's Science Fiction, Illumen, Star*Line, Utopia Science Fiction, Eye to the Telescope, Abyss & Apex, Dreams & Nightmares, Gathering Storm, and Kaleidotrope. Her poems have been nominees for the Rhysling award for science fiction poetry in 2016, 2021, and 2022.

=== Scholarship ===
Vibbert has presented scholarly research on the subjects of women's headgear of the late Middle Ages, (within the Society for Creative Anachronism), on class issues in science fiction, and on the statistical analysis of female writers of science fiction short stories.

== Awards ==
- "Keep Talking" won the 2014 Apex Magazine Story of the Year.
- "The Willing Body, the Reluctant Heart" placed second in the Analog Reader's Poll in 2018.
- "The Unlikely Heroines of Callisto Station" placed second in the Analog Reader's Poll in 2021.
- "We Built This City" won the Clarkesworld Reader's Poll for Best Novelette/Novella in 2022 and was a finalist for the 2022 Nebula Award for Best Novelette and the 2023 Hugo Award for Best Novelette.

== Bibliography ==
=== Novels ===
- Galactic Hellcats (2021)
- The Gods Awoke (2022)
- MegaDeath (2022), with Tory Quinn
- Andrei and the Hellcats (2024)
- Multitude (2026)

=== Poetry ===
List of poems

Title	Year	First published	Reprinted/collected
“Appartment on Hessler”	2006	Deep Cleveland	
"Pancho's Email"	2007	Abyss and Apex	
“Forearm Bones”	2008	Science Fiction & Fantasy Poetry Association's Online Halloween Poetry Reading	
“Found Poems”	2009	Death In Common: Poems From Unlikely Victims	
“What do you want for lunch?”	2013	Sanitarium Magazine, Issue 9	
“At the Tip Top”	2013	Eye to the Telescope, Issue 9	
“Two Body Problem”	2013	Eye to the Telescope, Issue 9	
“The Mermaids of Lake Erie”	2013	The Hessler Street Fair Poetry Contest, Second Prize	
“The Slaves in my Basement”	2014	Songs of Eretz	
“Shelter”	2014	Vending Machine: Poetry for Change	
“An Unrequited Process Loops”	2015	Asimov's Science Fiction, February 2015.	2016 Rhysling Award Anthology. The Poetry Planet podcast for Starship Sofa.
“How to Talk to Boys”	2016	The Ghazal Page, August 2016.	
“Little Monsters”	2017	Science Fiction & Fantasy Poetry Association's Online Halloween Poetry Reading.	
“The Magic Mirror Confesses”	2017	Illumen, Fall 2017.	
“Calling it a Day”	2018	Spaceports and Spidersilk, January 2018.	
“To the Knight’s Lady”	2018	Eye to the Telescope, January 2018.	
“Hazel”	2018	Liquid Imagination	
"To Current Occupant"	2018	Strange Horizons, March 2018	
"Spaceship Office Building"	2018	Grievous Angel, July, 2018	
"The Last Typewriter"	2018	Riddled With Arrows, November 2018	
“We Carry”	2019	Analog Science Fiction & Fact, March 2019	
“To Klaatu”	2019	Geek Out! Queer Pop Lit Art & Ideas	
“My Killer Robot”	2019	Illumen, April 2019	
“On the Blackrock Road”	2019	Dreams & Nightmares, May 2019	
"Choose You Own Advent"	2019	Lite Lit One	
"Puzzle Box"	2019	Lite Lit One	
"St. Sebastian"	2019	Lite Lit One	
"Life in Front of Counters"	2019	Lite Lit One	
“Football on Mars”	2019	Illumen, Autumn 2019	
“Unlooping, a Time Travel Rondel	2020	Asimov's Science Fiction, January 2020.	2021 Rhysling Award Anthology.
"The Hot One"	2020	Kaleidotrope, January 2020.	
“Homeland Offense”	2020	Dreams & Nightmares, January 2020.	
“Arab Law Student Shot by Police”	2020	Cleveland Humanities Festival 2020. (Performed by Hillary Wheelock.)	
“Altar Stone”		The Red House Anthology	
“Princess Cat Robot”	2021	Utopia Science Fiction Magazine, February 2021.	
“Over the Moon”	2021	Utopia Science Fiction Magazine, February 2021.	
“Skynet Demurs”	2021	Utopia Science Fiction Magazine, February 2021.	
"Window is Born"	2021	TERSE, May 2021.	
“Infernocrusher”	2022	Simultaneous Times Newsletter, December 2021.	
“Dragonrider”	2022	Simultaneous Times Newsletter, December 2021.	
"Return to the Cities"	2022	The Future Fire, Issue 60.	
“Alternate Realities”	2022	Illumen, Winter 2022.	
“Eyeliner Boy”	2022	Riddled With Arrows, February 2022.	
“If I Were Human”	2022	Star*Line, Volume 45, Issue 2.	
“Positronic Effigy”	2023	Abyss & Apex, September 2023.	
