= Dave Truesdale =

American editor and literary critic (born 1950)

- Born: David A. Truesdale; October 1950 (age 75–76)
- Occupations: Editor; critic

David A. Truesdale is an American science fiction editor and literary critic.

== Early life ==
Truesdale graduated from the University of Wisconsin–Oshkosh with a double major in English and philosophy.

== Editorial career ==
Truesdale founded his science fiction fanzine Tangent in 1975 while living in Oshkosh, Wisconsin. The magazine ceased publication in 1977, but Truesdale revived it in 1993 and moved it online in 1997. Tangent Online currently features articles, interviews, editorials and reviews of fiction published in professional science fiction and fantasy magazines. It has been a finalist six times for a Hugo Award. In 2004 Tangent Online was a finalist for a World Fantasy Award in the Special Award, Non-Professional category. In 2002 the magazine was awarded sixth place in the Locus Award for Best Website category.

Truesdale served as editor for the SFWA Bulletin from 1999-2002 and as a columnist for F&SF from 2005-2009. He also served as a judge for the World Fantasy Award in 1998.

== Controversies ==
=== 2010 email petition ===
In 2010 Truesdale circulated a petition to oppose creation of a SFWA advisory board which was meant to peer-review the SFWA Bulletin as a guard against possibly harmful elements. The petition was perceived as opposing efforts within the SFWA to reduce sexism. It read, in part: “It is our hope others will add their names to this call for SFWA President Steven Gould to kill any proposed advisory board or any other method designed to censor or infringe on any SFWA member their First Amendment right to freedom of speech in the pages of the SFWA Bulletin".

=== 2016 MidAmeriCon II expulsion ===
In 2016 Truesdale served as moderator for the State of Short Fiction panel at MidAmeriCon II in Kansas City, Missouri, which administered the Hugo Awards. Truesdale began the session with a long monologue asserting his opinions. His comments were considered inflammatory, and it was reported that some people walked out of the panel discussion, while others on the panel eventually interrupted in order to continue the discussion. Afterward, Truesdale was expelled from the convention even though he was a 2016 finalist for a Hugo Award. According to a statement from MidAmeriCon II: "Dave Truesdale's membership was revoked because he violated MidAmeriCon II's Code of Conduct. Specifically, he caused 'significant interference with event operations and caused excessive discomfort to others'."
