= Slow Sculpture =

Short story by Theodore Sturgeon

"Slow Sculpture" is a science fiction short story by American writer Theodore Sturgeon. First published in the Galaxy Science Fiction issue of February 1970, it won the 1970 Nebula Award for Best Novelette and the 1971 Hugo Award for Best Short Story.

== Synopsis ==
A young woman comes across a lonely older man performing scientific experiments in his orchard. She has arrived there by chance after finding a lump in her breast and, panicking, taking an aimless walk. He tells her that he can fix her and she follows him to his house, passing a large bonsai tree. She asks about it and the man is pleasantly surprised by the courteous nature of her query, while the woman observes that some of the strongest and most interesting bonsais are those that have gone overlooked because they were oddly shaped or suffered other problems.

On reaching his laboratory, the man explains his theory that electrical imbalances in individual cells can cause these to function improperly, leading to cancer. He has developed a substance which distributes the excess electrical charge between many cells so that each has only a slight imbalance and can function normally. One side effect is that the subject builds up a large static charge. He administers the substance and stands the woman on a glass bowl to insulate her from surroundings as she builds up a charge of 80,000 volts. The man identifies the presence of a malignant tumor and the woman, unable to deal with this confirmation of her worst fears, faints. The man catches her to keep her from injury but suffers burns to his arms as she discharges into him.

When the woman regains consciousness, the man tells her that she has been cured of her cancer. She begins to thank him, but he suddenly becomes angry saying that he does not want to hear speeches about how he owes it to the world to share his cure and warns her against telling anyone or he will take legal action to save himself from accusations of medical malpractice. He asks the woman to leave without either of them knowing the other's name. The next morning, she appears to have left and the man goes to tend his bonsai. He understands the tree and that it cannot be ordered to grow in a particular way but can only be given gentle guidance as part of a long, slow sculpturing process which could sculpt the man as much as the tree.

The woman, who has been observing the man in secret, accuses him of being angry and frightened. He explains that years earlier he had developed a new car exhaust which reduced pollution and increased mileage. He had become wealthy as a result, not because of the success of his idea but because car manufacturers and oil refining companies paid him to bury it. He is angry that society is unwilling to accept this and many other solutions he has developed to the world's problems. He also admits to being frightened of close relationships. The woman suggests that he should treat humanity like a bonsai, guiding them towards his ideas rather than ordering them to accept them, and that relationships should be treated similarly if they are to be made to work. The story ends with the man asking the woman her name.

== Themes ==
A common theme throughout Sturgeon's work is an individual's ability or inability to communicate with others. Lahna Diskin wrote in her biography of Sturgeon that this theme rings out in "Slow Sculpture" where the young woman compares making a relationship work with handling a living thing, such as a bonsai. While it is a story about the power of love, it also suggests that industrialists and politicians will suppress technological advances if it serves their own interests by maintaining the status quo.

== Awards and nominations ==
"Slow Sculpture" won the 1970 Nebula Award for Best Novelette and the 1971 Hugo Award for Best Short Story. It was also nominated for the 1970 Locus Award for Best Short Fiction, ultimately finishing sixth.

== Sources ==
- Diskin, Lahna F. (1981). Theodore Sturgeon. Wildside Press. ISBN 0-916732-18-5.
