= Danny Goes to Mars =

"Danny Goes to Mars" is a science fiction short story by American writer Pamela Sargent. It was first published in Isaac Asimov's Science Fiction Magazine, in October 1992.

== Plot summary ==
After new developments in rocket propulsion enable a trip to Mars to be completed in weeks instead of months, Vice-President Dan Quayle is persuaded to join the crew of the first mission — and becomes its sole survivor.

== Reception ==
"Danny Goes to Mars" won the Nebula Award for Best Novelette of 1992, and was a finalist for the 1993 Hugo Award for Best Novelette.

Paul Di Filippo described it as "wicked satire". The Sun-Sentinel considered it to be "affectionate", noting that although "Sargent gently mocks Quayle's intellectual and spiritual limitations", she also portrays him as having genuine courage; similarly, Mark Pitcavage considered Quayle "a likeable and earnest dimbulb". Geoffrey Landis, writing in 1993, described it as "amusing (but) outdated".
