= Small Changes Over Long Periods of Time =

2017 novelette by K. M. Szpara

"Small Changes Over Long Periods of Time" is a 2017 horror fiction novelette by K.M. Szpara. It was first published in Uncanny Magazine.

== Synopsis ==
A trans man discovers that becoming a vampire has more consequences than he had expected.

== Reception ==
"Small Changes Over Long Periods of Time" was a finalist for the Nebula Award for Best Novelette of 2017, and the 2018 Hugo Award for Best Novelette. Apex Magazine noted that it was "threaded with anger, hunger, and longing", and commended Szpara's "use of the vampire trope to explore isolation".

== Sequel ==
In 2020, Szpara announced that he was working on a "novel that expands (the) story."
