= Ignyte Award for Outstanding Novelette =

Annual literary award for speculative fiction

- Awarded for: Works between 7,500 - 17,499 words
- Country: United States
- Presented by: FIYAH Literary Magazine
- First award: 2020; 6 years ago
- Most recent winner: Somto Ihezue ("We Begin Where Infinity Ends")
- Website: ignyteawards.fiyahlitmag.com

The Ignyte Award for Outstanding Novelette is a literary award given annually as part of the Ignyte Awards.

== Winners and finalists ==
* Winners

Year	Author	Work	Publisher	Ref.
2020	N. K. Jemisin*	"Emergency Skin"	Amazon Forward Collection	
2020	Jen Brown	"While Dragons Claim the Sky"	FIYAH, Spring 2019	
2020	Ted Chiang	"Omphalos"	Exhalation: Stories	
2020	Neon Yang	"Circus Girl, The Hunter, and Mirror Boy"	Tor.com, January 2019	
2020	Caroline M. Yoachim	"The Archronology of Love"	Lightspeed, April 2019	
2021	Aliette de Bodard*	"The Inaccessibility of Heaven"	Uncanny Magazine, July-August 2020	
2021	Ozzie M. Gartrell	"The Transition of Osoosi"	FIYAH, Winter 2020	
2021	Justin C. Key	"One Hand in the Coffin"	Strange Horizons, January 2020	
2021	Zin E. Rocklyn	"The Night Sun"	Tor.com, March 2020	
2021	Sheree Renée Thomas	"Love Hangover"	SLAY: Stories of the Vampire Noire	
2022	Peng Shepherd*	"The Future Library"	Tor.com, August 2021	
2022	Malka Older	"The Badger's Digestion; or The First First-Hand Description… of Deneskan Beastcraft by an Aouwan Researcher"	Constelación, April 2021	
2022	An Owomoyela	"The Equations of the Dead"	Lightspeed, April 2021	
2022	C. L. Polk	"Music of the Siphorophenes"	F&SF, March-April 2021	
2022	Caroline M. Yoachim	"Colors of the Immortal Palette"	Uncanny Magazine, March-April 2021	
2023	John Chu*	"If You Find Yourself Speaking to God, Address God With the Informal You"	Uncanny Magazine, July-August 2022	
2023	S. L. Huang	"Murder by Pixel: Crime and Responsibility in the Digital Darkness"	Clarkesworld, December 2022	
2023	Stephen Graham Jones	"Men, Women, and Chainsaws"	Tor.com, April 2022	
2023	Tobi Ogundiran	"The Epic of Qu-Shittu"	F&SF, March-April 2022	
2023	Aigner Loren Wilson	"To Carve Home In Your Bones"	F&SF, November-December 2022	
2024	Eboni J. Dunbar*	"Spell For Grief and Longing"	FIYAH, Spring 2023	
2024	Renan Bernardo	"A Short Biography of a Conscious Chair"	Samovar, February 2023	
2024	C. L. Polk	"Ivy, Angelica, Bay"	Tor.com, December 2023	
2024	Angela Liu	"Imagine: Purple-Haired Girl Shooting Down the Moon"	Clarkesworld, June 2023	
2024	Cao Baiyu (author)	"Zhuangzi’s Dream"	Clarkesworld, January 2023	
2024	Stella Jiayue Zhu (translator)	"Zhuangzi’s Dream"	Clarkesworld, January 2023	
2025	Shingai Njeri Kagunda*	"We Who Will Not Die"	Psychopomp, September 2024	
2025	Tananarive Due	"A Stranger Knocks"	Uncanny Magazine, September-October 2024	
2025	M. M. Olivas	"¡Sangronas! Un Lista de Terror"	Uncanny Magazine, September-October 2024	
2025	A. W. Prihandita	"Negative Scholarship on the Fifth State of Being"	Clarkesworld, November 2024	
2025	Eugenia Triantafyllou	"Joanna's Bodies"	Psychopomp, July 2024	
2026	Somto Ihezue*	"We Begin Where Infinity Ends"	Clarkesworld, February 2025	
2026	Thomas Ha	"Uncertain Sons"	Uncertain Sons	
2026	Alaya Dawn Johnson	"What I Saw Before the War"	Reactor, January 2025	
2026	Isabel J. Kim	"Human Voices"	Lightspeed, September 2025	
2026	H.H. Pak	"Never Eaten Vegetables"	Clarkesworld, January 2025	
