= Hayden Howard =

American novelist

John Hayden Howard
- Born: December 19, 1925; Santa Barbara, California, USA
- Died: October 23, 2014 (aged 88); Santa Barbara, California, USA
- Occupations: Educator; poet; author
- Writing career
- Pen name: Hayden Howard
- Genre: science fiction

John Hayden Howard (1925–2014) was an American educator, poet and science fiction author. He used the pen name Hayden Howard.

== Biography ==
Howard was born in Cottage Hospital, Santa Barbara, California, the son of John Macdougall Howard and Mary Kathryn (Hayden) Howard. He was educated at Santa Barbara High School, the University of California, Los Angeles, and the University of California, Santa Barbara. He taught sixth grade at Jefferson Elementary School in Santa Barbara until it closed in 1972.

Howard died in Santa Barbara, survived by his wife Jillian Pearce Winslow, four children, six grandchildren, a sister and two nephews.

== Literary career ==
In a career extending from 1952 to 1971, Howard wrote a scattering of short stories for various science fiction magazines, his work appearing in Analog Science Fiction/Science Fact, Galaxy Magazine, If, The Magazine of Fantasy and Science Fiction, Planet Stories, and Worlds of If. His most extended series comprises seven tales exploring overpopulation, featuring "a group of indigenous Canadian Inuit (referred to as Eskimos, a term not then deprecated) ... transformed by an Alien presence into an apparently benign, fast-breeding new species called Esks, which duly become an Esk Problem." These were afterwards combined into his only novel, The Eskimo Invasion.

== Works ==
=== Esks series ===
- "Death and Birth of the Angakok" (1965)
- "The Eskimo Invasion" (1966)
- "Who Is Human?" (1966)
- "Too Many Esks" (1966)
- "The Modern Penitentiary" (1966)
- "Our Man in Peking" (1967)
- "The Purpose of Life" (1967)
- The Eskimo Invasion (1967) Nominated for 1967 Nebula Award for Best Novel

=== Kendy series ===
- "Kendy's World" (1969)
- "Tomorrow Cum Laude" (1969)

=== Other short fiction ===
- "It (1952)
- "The Luminous Blonde (1952)
- "The Ethic of the Assassin (1953)
- "The Un-Reconstructed Woman (1953)
- "Murder Beneath the Polar Ice (1960)
- "Gremmie's Reef (1964)
- "Beyond Words (1968)
- "The Biggest Oil Disaster (1970)
- "Oil-Mad Bug-Eyed Monsters (1970)
- "To Grab Power (1971)

== Awards ==
The short story "The Eskimo Invasion" was nominated for the 1967 Hugo Award for Best Novelette and the 1967 Nebula Award for Best Novelette; the novel The Eskimo Invasion was nominated for the 1968 Nebula Award for Best Novel.
