= Eric James Stone =

American novelist

- Stone at CONduit 17 in 2007.
- Born: 1967 (age 58–59); United States
- Occupations: Author, editor
- Writing career
- Genres: Science fiction, fantasy, horror
- Notable work: "That Leviathan, Whom Thou Hast Made"
- Notable awards: Nebula Award for Best Novelette (2010)
- Website: ericjamesstone.com

Eric James Stone (born 1967) is an American science fiction, fantasy, and horror author. He won the 2004 Writers of the Future contest, and has published in Analog Science Fiction and Fact, InterGalactic Medicine Show, and Jim Baen's Universe. His 2010 novelette, "That Leviathan, Whom Thou Hast Made", won the Nebula Award for Best Novelette and was a finalist for the Hugo Award.

He became the assistant editor for Orson Scott Card's InterGalactic Medicine Show in 2009, and served as web-host for Tangent Online. He received a degree in political science at Brigham Young University and went on to graduate from Baylor Law School. Stone lives in Eagle Mountain, Utah.

== Personal life ==
On November 21, 2012, Stone announced his engagement to Darci Rhoades.

== Bibliography ==
=== Novels ===
- Unforgettable (2011, self-published, picked up by Baen Books, ISBN 978-1-4767-8108-2, January 2016)

=== Collections ===
- Rejiggering the Thingamajig and Other Stories (Paper Golem, ISBN 978-0-9795349-9-7, August 2011)

=== Short fiction ===
Date	Title	Publication	Publisher	ISBN
August 2004	"In Memory"	L. Ron Hubbard Presents Writers of the Future, Volume XX	Galaxy Press	ISBN 1-59212-177-2
September 2004	"The Man Who Moved the Moon"	All the Rage This Year: The Phobos Science Fiction Anthology 3	Phobos Books	ISBN 0-9720026-5-0
August 2005	"Betrayer of Trees"	L. Ron Hubbard Presents Writers of the Future, Volume XXI	Galaxy Press	ISBN 1-59212-217-5
September 2005	"Resonance"	Analog Science Fiction and Fact		
October 2005	"Taint of Treason"	Orson Scott Card’s Intergalactic Medicine Show		
March 2006	"Salt of Judas"	Orson Scott Card’s Intergalactic Medicine Show		
May 2006	"Loophole"	Warp & Weave		
December 2006	"Upgrade"	Analog Science Fiction and Fact		
February 2007	"Tabloid Reporter to the Stars"	Orson Scott Card’s Intergalactic Medicine Show		
February 2008	"Premature Emergence"	Jim Baen's Universe		
April 2008	"Accounting for Dragons"	Orson Scott Card’s Intergalactic Medicine Show		
May 2008	"The Ashes of His Fathers"	Analog Science Fiction and Fact		
June 2008	"The Six Billion Dollar Colon"	Jay Lake: Intelligently Redesigned	Digital Alchemy Press	
October 2008	"P.R. Problems"	Blood Lite	Pocket Books	ISBN 978-1-4165-6783-7
December 2008	"The Robot Sorcerer"	Orson Scott Card’s Intergalactic Medicine Show		
April 2009	"The Final Element"	Analog Science Fiction and Fact		
July 2009	"Like Diamond Tears From Emerald Eyes"	Orson Scott Card’s Intergalactic Medicine Show		
September 2009	"Attitude Adjustment"	Analog Science Fiction and Fact		
January 2010	"Rejiggering the Thingamajig"	Analog Science Fiction and Fact		
June 2010	"An Early Ford Mustang"	Orson Scott Card’s Intergalactic Medicine Show		
September 2010	"American Banshee"	Blood Lite 2: Overbite	Gallery Books	ISBN 978-1-4391-8765-4
September 2010	"Bird-Dropping and Sunday"	The Immersion Book of Science Fiction	Immersion Press	ISBN 978-0-9563924-1-1
September 2010	"That Leviathan, Whom Thou Hast Made"	Analog Science Fiction and Fact		
October 28, 2010	"The Greatest Science Fiction Story Ever Written"	Nature		
December 14, 2010	"Buy You a Mockingbird"	Daily Science Fiction		
January 6, 2011	"Waiting for Raymond"	Daily Science Fiction		
March 24, 2011	"Girl Who Asks Too Much"	Daily Science Fiction		
May 19, 2011	"They Do It with Robots"	Daily Science Fiction		
June 28, 2011	"Freefall"	Daily Science Fiction		
June 2011	"Into the West "	Orson Scott Card’s Intergalactic Medicine Show		
August 2011	"The Day the Music Died "	Rejiggering the Thingamajig and Other Stories	Paper Golem	ISBN 978-0-9795349-9-7
November 8, 2011	"A Great Destiny"	Daily Science Fiction		
November 2011	"A Lincoln in Time"	Heir Apparent: Digital Science Fiction Anthology 4	Digital Science Fiction	
February 9, 2012	"The Steel Throne"	Daily Science Fiction		
May 2012	"Lobstersaurus"	Analog Science Fiction and Fact		
June 20, 2012	"Dark Roads for the Eternal Ruler"	Daily Science Fiction		
June 2012	"Nine-Tenths of the Law"	Blood Lite III: Aftertaste	Pocket Books	ISBN 978-1-4516-3624-6
September 2012	"Write What You Want"	Orson Scott Card’s Intergalactic Medicine Show		
June 2013	"Cui Bono"	The Urban Green Man	Edge Science Fiction and Fantasy Publishing	ISBN 978-1-77053-038-6
July 26, 2013	"By the Hands of Juan Perón"	Daily Science Fiction		
August 28, 2013	"Love Is Orange, Love Is Red"	Daily Science Fiction		
September 2013	"A Crash Course in Fate"	What Fates Impose	Alliteration Ink	ISBN 978-1-939840-05-9
November 2013	"The Humans in the Walls"	Space Eldritch II: The Haunted Stars	Cold Fusion Media	ISBN 978-0-615-91859-4
July 2014	"A Sufficiently Advanced Christmas"	A Fantastic Holiday Season: The Gift of Stories	WordFire Press	ISBN 978-1-61475-202-8
October 13, 2014	"Motivational Story"	Daily Science Fiction		
March 2015	"An Immense Darkness"	Analog Science Fiction and Fact		
September 2015	"Unforgettable "	Heroic: Tales of the Extraordinary	Dan Farr Productions	ISBN 978-1-5173-2827-6
December 2016	"Crowdfinding"	Analog Science Fiction and Fact		
December 2016	"A Special Extra Christmas"	Orson Scott Card’s Intergalactic Medicine Show		

== Awards ==
Year	Organization	Award title, Category	Work	Result	Ref.
2010	Readers of Analog Science Fiction and Fact	AnLab Awards, Best Short Story	"Rejiggering the Thingamajig"	Nominated	
2011	World Science Fiction Convention	Hugo Award, Best Novelette	"That Leviathan, Whom Thou Hast Made"	Nominated	
2011	SFWA	Nebula Award, Novelette	"That Leviathan, Whom Thou Hast Made"	Won	
