= William Sanders (writer) =

American novelist

- Born: April 28, 1942; Arkansas, U.S.
- Died: June 29, 2017 (aged 75); Tahlequah, Oklahoma
- Education: University of Arkansas at Monticello
- Occupation: Writer
- Spouse: Phyllis
- Writing career
- Genre: Speculative fiction

William Sanders (April 28, 1942 – June 29, 2017) was an American speculative fiction writer, primarily noted for his alternate history short fiction, and was the senior editor of the online science fiction magazine Helix SF. He twice won the Sidewise Award for Alternate History and was a finalist for other honors including the Nebula Award.

== Life ==
Sanders was born in 1942 in Arkansas, the son of Cordell and William N. Sanders. Sanders graduated from the University of Arkansas at Monticello. He served in the U.S. Army from 1963 to 1966 and was a Vietnam War veteran.

Sanders and his wife Phyllis lived in Tahlequah, Oklahoma. Sanders died after a prolonged illness on June 29, 2017.

== Writing ==
Sanders started his literary career in 1973 by writing books and magazine columns focused on sports and outdoor subjects. Among his later speculative novels are Journey to Fusang (1988), The Wild Blue and the Gray (1991, revised edition 2002) and The Ballad of Billy Badass & the Rose of Turkestan (1999). The first two are alternate histories with a humorous bent while the last is a fantasy novel.

He also wrote a number of mystery novels, including a series featuring Western writer Taggart Roper beginning with The Next Victim (St. Martin's Press 1993), as well as novels marketed by the publisher as Action/Adventure, beginning with Hardball (Berkley Jove 1992). In an author's afterword to his short story "Ninekiller and the Neterw", included in the Roger Zelazny tribute collection "Lord of the Fantastic", Sanders credits Roger Zelazny for talking Sanders into returning to writing SF/F stories with American Indian themes.

Sanders, a former powwow dancer, is best known for his use of American Indian themes and his dry, often cynical sense of humor. His most-anthologized and perhaps best known work is "The Undiscovered", an alternate history in which Shakespeare is transported to Virginia and writes "Hamlet" for the Cherokee tribe. The story won the Sidewise Award for Alternate History in 1997. Sanders won a second Sidewise Award for his story Empire in 2002. Sanders said that he considers his best story to be Dry Bones.

A stickler for detail and accuracy, Sanders studied history, which led to the publication in 2003 of Conquest: Hernando de Soto and the Indians, 1539-1543, a book begun some two decades earlier and researched by travelling extensively in the southeastern quarter of the US, by motorcycle and small boat and on foot, retracing de Soto's probable routes.

As a non-fiction writer, he wrote numerous books on bicycle racing, kayaking, and backpacking. As Sundown Slim he wrote a humor column for "Competitive Cycling", a bike racing magazine in the mid-1970s. He also contributed to Bike World Magazine in the same period.

== Helix SF magazine ==
From 2006 until the final issue in 2008, Sanders was the editor and publisher of the online quarterly magazine Helix SF. According to The Encyclopedia of Science Fiction, Helix SF was "generally praised for the quality of its fiction and poetry." The magazine was also noted for having almost half the published stories written by women, perhaps the only genre magazine of the time to do this.

In 2008, Sanders wrote a rejection letter in which he called Muslims "sheet heads", "worm brained" and "incapable of honesty." Sanders would later deny that he was referring to Muslims as a whole. However, the controversy ultimately resulted in several authors asking to pull their stories from the Helix archives after they found out Sanders had offered that option to N.K. Jemisin. As a result of the controversy, Sanders shut down the magazine and deleted its website, preventing any of the magazine's archives from being read.

== Bibliography ==
- The Bicycle Racing Book. Domus Books, 1979. ISBN 9780891960584 (non-fiction)
- Guide to Inflatable Canoes and Kayaks. World Publications, 1979. ISBN 9780890372098 (non-fiction)
- Backcountry Bikepacking. Stackpole Books, 1982. ISBN 9780811722582 (non-fiction)
- Kayak Touring. Stackpole Books, 1984. ISBN 9780811721936 (non-fiction)
- Journey to Fusang. Warner Books, 1988. ISBN 9780445207653 (comic alternative history)
- Pockets of Resistance. Warner Books, 1990. ISBN 9780445210240 written under Will Sundown pseudonym (speculative fiction)
- The Hellbound Train. Popular Library, 1991. ISBN 9780445210257 written under Will Sundown pseudonym (speculative fiction)
- The Wild Blue and the Gray. Warner Books, 1991. ISBN 9780446361422 (alternative history)
- Steel Wings. Jove Books, 1991. ISBN 9780515105537 (mystery)
- Hardball. Diamond Books, 1992. ISBN 9781557736451 Hardball series (action/adventure)
- Aryan Legion. Diamond Books, 1992. ISBN 9781557737236 Hardball series (action/adventure)
- Skorpion. Diamond Books, 1992. ISBN 9781557738288 Hardball series (action/adventure)
- The Next Victim. St. Martin's Press, 1993. ISBN 9780312088613 Taggart Roper series (mystery)
- A Death on 66. St. Martin's Press, 1994. ISBN 9780312104528 Taggart Roper series (mystery)
- Blood Autumn. St. Martin's Press, 1995. ISBN 9780312117559 Taggart Roper series (mystery)
- Billy Mitchell's Overt Act. Baen Books, 1998 (short story), (collected in Harry Turtledove's anthology Alternate Generals)
- The Ballad of Billy Badass and the Rose of Turkestan. Yandro House, 1999. ISBN 9780738803098 (modern fantasy)
- The Bernadette Operation. Xlibris Corporation, 2000. ISBN 9780738854236 (thriller)
- J. iPublish.com, 2001. ISBN 9780759550124 (speculative fiction)
- Smoke. Wildside Press, 2002. ISBN 9781592241460 (mystery)
- Are We Having Fun Yet? American Indian Fantasy Stories. Wildside Press, 2002. ISBN 9781587157097 (short story collection)
- Empire. Baen Books, 2002 (short story), (collected in Harry Turtledove's anthology Alternate Generals II)
- Conquest: Hernando de Soto and the Indians, 1539-1543. Wilside Press, 2003. ISBN 9780809500994 (non-fiction)
- Is It Now Yet? Wildside Press, 2005. ISBN 9780809556175 (short story collection)
- Not Fade Away. Baen Books, 2005 (short story), (collected in Harry Turtledove's anthology Alternate Generals III)
- East of the Sun and West of Fort Smith. Noeilana Books, 2008. ISBN 9781934648650 (short story collection)
