= Tina Connolly =

American novelist

- Connolly at World Fantasy Convention 2026
- Born: St. Louis, Missouri, U.S.
- Occupation: Writer
- Writing career
- Period: 2004–present
- Genres: Science fiction, fantasy
- Website: tinaconnolly.com

Tina Connolly is an American science fiction and fantasy writer and poet. Her 2012 debut novel Ironskin was nominated for the Nebula Award for Best Novel. Her flash fiction podcast "Toasted Cake" won the Parsec Award for Best New Speculative Fiction Podcaster/Team.

Her novelette "The Last Banquet of Temporal Confections", published by Tor.com, was a finalist for the Hugo Award for Best Novelette.

== Bibliography ==
=== Novels ===
- Ironskin (Tor, 2012)
- Copperhead (Tor, 2013)
- Silverblind (Tor, 2014)
- Seriously Wicked (Tor, 2015)
- Seriously Shifted (Tor, 2016)
- Seriously Hexed (Tor, 2017)
- Glitterpony Farm (ChooseCo Publishing, 2023)
- Fairy House Disaster (ChooseCo Publishing, 2024)

=== Short fiction ===
Collections

- On the Eyeball Floor and Other Stories (Fairwood Press, 2016)

Stories (Note: Short stories unless otherwise noted.)

Title	Year	First published	Reprinted/collected	Notes
We will wake among the gods, among the stars	2016	Yoachim, Caroline M. & Tina Connolly (January–February 2016). "We will wake among the gods, among the stars". Analog Science Fiction and Fact. 136 (1&2): 52–69.		Novelette
Pipecleaner Sculptures and Other Necessary Work	2017	Connolly, Tina. “Pipecleaner Sculptures and Other Necessary Work.” Uncanny Magazine, 7 November 2017, https://www.uncannymagazine.com/article/pipecleaner-sculptures-necessary-work/.		Flash
The Last Banquet of Temporal Confections	2018	Connolly, Tina. “The Last Banquet of Temporal Confections.” Reactor, 11 July 2018, reactormag.com/the-last-banquet-of-temporal-confections-tina-connolly/.		Novelette
A Sharp Breath of Birds	2019	Connolly, Tina. “A Sharp Breath of Birds.” Uncanny Magazine, 5 March 2019, https://www.uncannymagazine.com/article/a-sharp-breath-of-birds/.		Flash
Once More Unto the Breach (But Don’t Worry, the Inflatable Swords Are Latex-Free)	2020	Connolly, Tina. “Once More Unto the Breach (But Don’t Worry, the Inflatable Swords Are Latex-Free).” Uncanny Magazine, 7 July 2020, https://www.uncannymagazine.com/article/once-more-unto-the-breach-but-dont-worry-the-inflatable-swords-are-latex-free/.		Flash
How to Safely Store Your Magical Artifacts After Saving the World	2022	Connolly, Tina. “How to Safely Store Your Magical Artifacts After Saving the World.” Uncanny Magazine, 4 January 2022, https://www.uncannymagazine.com/article/how-to-safely-store-your-magical-artifacts-after-saving-the-world/.		Flash

———————

== Awards ==
- 2017 World Fantasy Award for Best Collection for On the Eyeball Floor and Other Stories (nominee)
