= Tangent Online =

Online magazine specialized in reviewing fiction

- Website type: Online Magazine
- Website: Tangent Online
- Commercial: No
- Launched: 1997
- Current status: Ongoing

Tangent Online is an online magazine launched in its online incarnation in 1997, though it began as a print magazine in 1993. Tangent Online is edited by Dave Truesdale, with web-hoster Eric James Stone. The magazine covers reviews of science fiction and fantasy short fiction as well as providing classic interviews, articles, and editorials. According to Sam Moskowitz, Tangent was the first of its kind in the history of the SF field (going back to its official inception in 1926) to review short science fiction and fantasy exclusively.

== Reception ==
Paul Di Filippo of Sci Fi Weekly reviewed the site as "a one-stop clearinghouse for information on the good, the bad and the ugly in the short-story jungle."

== Awards ==
From 1997 through 1999, Tangent was nominated each year for the Hugo Award for Best Fanzine. In 2002, Tangent Online received sixth place for the Locus Award for Best Website and nominated for the Hugo Award for Best Website. In 2004 Tangent Online was nominated for a World Fantasy Award in the Special Award, Non-Professional category.
