= Astounding Award for Best New Writer =

Annual awards for science fiction or fantasy

The Astounding Award for Best New Writer
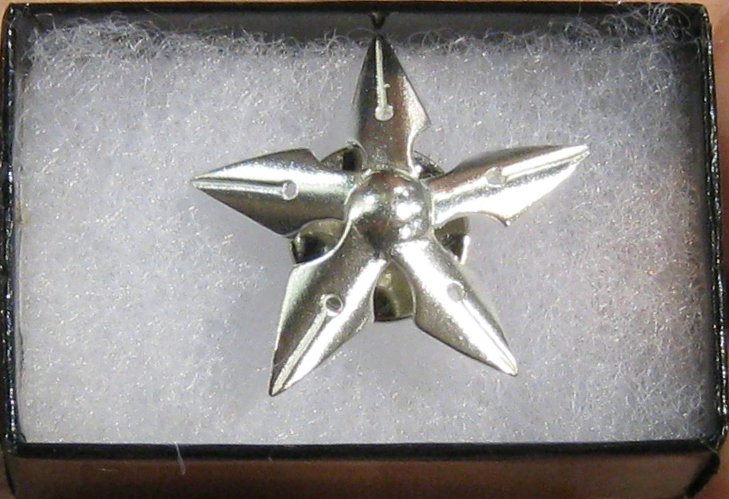
- Pin given to all winners and finalists
- Awarded for: The best new writer whose first professional work of science fiction or fantasy was published within the two previous calendar years.
- Presented by: World Science Fiction Society
- First award: 1973
- Most recent winner: Antonia Hodgson

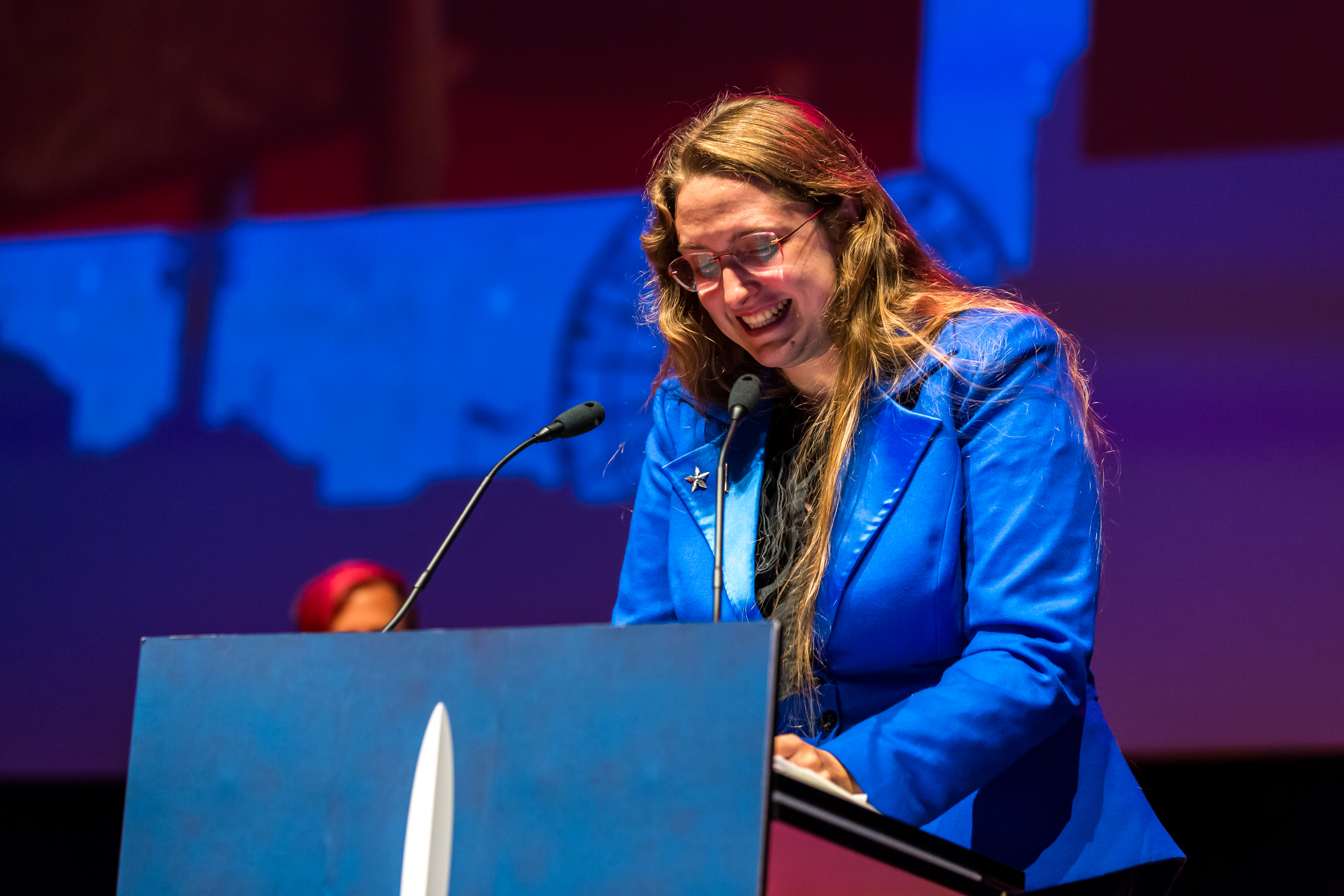
Ada Palmer accepting the 2017 award

The Astounding Award for Best New Writer (formerly the John W. Campbell Award for Best New Writer) is given annually to the best new writer whose first professional work of science fiction or fantasy was published within the two previous calendar years. It is named after Astounding Science Fiction (now Analog Science Fiction and Fact), a foundational science fiction magazine. The award is sponsored by Dell Magazines, which publishes Analog.

Between its founding in 1973 and 2019, the award was named after Astounding's long-time editor John W. Campbell, one of the most influential figures in the early history of science fiction. In the aftermath of 2019 winner Jeannette Ng's acceptance speech, in which she described Campbell as a fascist, the science fiction fandom community discussed whether it was appropriate to continue honoring Campbell in this way; the editor of Analog subsequently announced that the award had been renamed.

The nomination and selection process is administered by the World Science Fiction Society (WSFS), represented by the current Worldcon committee, and the award is presented at the Hugo Award ceremony at the Worldcon, although it is not itself a Hugo Award. All finalists receive a pin, while the winner receives a plaque. Beginning in 2005, the award has also included a tiara; created at the behest of 2004 winner Jay Lake and 2005 winner Elizabeth Bear, the tiara is passed from each year's winner to the next.

== Eligibility and voting ==
Writers are eligible for the Astounding Award for two years, and become eligible once they have a work of science fiction or fantasy published in a professional publication. Final decisions on eligibility are decided by the Hugo Administrators while qualification criteria are set by the sponsor, Dell Magazine. The eligibility criteria for what counts as a professional publication are roughly similar to those of the Science Fiction and Fantasy Writers Association (SFWA). As of 2023, qualifying publications must meet at least one of the following criteria: be accepted by SFWA; have at least 10,000 readers; pay the writer at least 8 cents a word and a total of at least US$80; or be self-published or published through a small press, with earnings for the author of at least US$3,000 in one year.

Members of the current and previous Worldcon are eligible to nominate new writers under the same procedures as the Hugo Awards. Initial nominations are made by members in January through March, at which point a shortlist is made of the six most-nominated writers—five prior to 2017—with additional finalists possible in the case of ties. Voting on the ballot of six finalists is performed roughly in April through July, subject to change depending on when that year's Worldcon is held.

Between 1977 and 1984, works by winners and finalists of the award were collected in the New Voices series of anthologies, edited by George R. R. Martin, in five volumes covering the awards from 1973 through 1977. Michael A. Burstein, who was a finalist in 1996 and won in 1997, commented that the largest effect of winning or being a finalist is not on sales but instead that it gives credibility with established authors and publishers. Criticism has been raised about the award that due to the eligibility requirements it honors writers who become well-known quickly, rather than necessarily the best or most influential authors from a historical perspective.

Over the 54 years the award has been active, 226 writers have been finalists. Of these, 55 authors have won, including one tie. There have been 63 writers who were finalists twice, 22 of whom won the award in their second year.

== Winners and finalists ==
Jerry Pournelle with the first award at the 1973 Hugo Awards Banquet

In the following table, the years correspond to the date of the ceremony, rather than the year when the writer's eligible work was first published. Each year links to the corresponding "year in literature". Although the award is not given explicitly for any particular work, and such works are not recorded by the World Science Fiction Society or Dell Magazines, a selection of works that the writer in question published in the eligibility period are listed. This list includes novels and short stories, and is not intended to be comprehensive. Entries with a yellow background and an asterisk (*) next to the writer's name have won the award; those with a gray background are the other finalists on the shortlist.

* Winners and joint winners

Winners and finalists
Year	Writer	Work(s)	Ref
1973	Jerry Pournelle*	"Peace with Honor", A Spaceship for the King	
1973	George Alec Effinger	"The Eight Thirty to Nine Slot", What Entropy Means to Me	
1973	Ruth Berman	"Stretch of Time"	
1973	George R. R. Martin	"The Hero"	
1973	Robert Thurston	"Stop Me Before I Tell More"	
1973	Lisa Tuttle	"Stranger in the House"	
1974	Spider Robinson*	"The Guy with the Eyes"	
1974	Lisa Tuttle*	"Stranger in the House"	
1974	Jesse Miller	"Pigeon City"	
1974	Thomas F. Monteleone	"Wendigo's Child"	
1974	Guy Snyder	Testament XXI	
1975	P. J. Plauger*	"Epicycle"	
1975	Alan Brennert	"Nostalgia Tripping"	
1975	Suzy McKee Charnas	Walk to the End of the World	
1975	Felix C. Gotschalk	"Outer Concentric", "The Examination"	
1975	Brenda Pearce	"Hot Spot"	
1975	John Varley	"Picnic on Nearside"	
1976	Tom Reamy*	"Twilla", "San Diego Lightfoot Sue"	
1976	John Varley	"Picnic on Nearside"	
1976	Arsen Darnay	"The Splendid Freedom", "Helium"	
1976	Joan D. Vinge	Tin Soldier	
1976	M. A. Foster	The Warriors of Dawn	
1977	C. J. Cherryh*	Gate of Ivrel	
1977	Jack L. Chalker	A Jungle of Stars	
1977	M. A. Foster	The Warriors of Dawn	
1977	Carter Scholz	"Closed Circuit"	
1978	Orson Scott Card*	"Ender's Game"	
1978	Stephen R. Donaldson	Lord Foul's Bane	
1978	Jack L. Chalker	A Jungle of Stars	
1978	Elizabeth A. Lynn	"We All Have to Go"	
1978	Bruce Sterling	"Man-Made Self", Involution Ocean	
1979	Stephen R. Donaldson*	Lord Foul's Bane	
1979	James P. Hogan	Inherit the Stars	
1979	Elizabeth A. Lynn	"We All Have to Go"	
1979	Cynthia Felice	"Longshanks", Godsfire	
1979	Barry B. Longyear	"The Tryouts"	
1979	Charles Sheffield	"What Song the Sirens Sang"	
1980	Barry B. Longyear*	"The Tryouts", Enemy Mine	
1980	Somtow Sucharitkul	"Sunsteps"	
1980	Diane Duane	The Door into Fire	
1980	Lynn Abbey	Daughter of the Bright Moon	
1980	Karen G. Jollie	"The Works of His Hand, Made Manifest"	
1980	Alan Ryan	"Dragon Story"	
1981	Somtow Sucharitkul*	"Sunsteps"	
1981	Robert L. Forward	"The Singing Diamond", Dragon's Egg	
1981	Susan C. Petrey	"Spareen Among the Tartars"	
1981	Diane Duane	The Door into Fire	
1981	Robert Stallman	The Orphan	
1981	Kevin Christensen	"A Dragon in the Man"	
1982	Alexis A. Gilliland*	The Revolution from Rosinante, Long Shot for Rosinante	
1982	Robert Stallman	The Orphan	
1982	David Brin	Sundiver	
1982	Paul O. Williams	The Breaking of Northwall, The Ends of the Circle	
1982	Michael Swanwick	"The Feast of St Janis", "Ginungagap"	
1983	Paul O. Williams*	The Breaking of Northwall, The Ends of the Circle	
1983	Lisa Goldstein	The Red Magician	
1983	David R. Palmer	"Emergence"	
1983	Joseph H. Delaney	"Brainchild"	
1983	Sandra Miesel	Dreamrider	
1983	Warren Norwood	An Image of Voices	
1984	R. A. MacAvoy*	Tea with the Black Dragon	
1984	Joseph H. Delaney	"Brainchild", "In the Face of My Enemy"	
1984	Lisa Goldstein	The Red Magician	
1984	Warren Norwood	An Image of Voices, Flexing the Warp	
1984	Sheri S. Tepper	King's Blood Four	
1984	Joel Rosenberg	The Sleeping Dragon	
1985	Lucius Shepard*	"The Taylorsville Reconstruction"	
1985	Melissa Scott	The Game Beyond	
1985	Geoffrey A. Landis	"Elemental"	
1985	Elissa Malcohn	"Lazuli"	
1985	Bradley Denton	"Music of the Spheres"	
1985	Ian McDonald	"The Islands of the Dead"	
1986	Melissa Scott*	The Game Beyond	
1986	Guy Gavriel Kay	The Summer Tree	
1986	Carl Sagan	Contact	
1986	Karen Joy Fowler	"Recalling Cinderella"	
1986	Tad Williams	Tailchaser's Song	
1986	David Zindell	"Shanidar"	
1987	Karen Joy Fowler*	"Recalling Cinderella", "Face Value"	
1987	Lois McMaster Bujold	Shards of Honor	
1987	Katharine Eliska Kimbriel	Fire Sanctuary	
1987	Rebecca Ore	"Projectile Weapons and Wild Alien Water"	
1987	Leo Frankowski	The Cross-Time Engineer	
1987	Robert Reed	"Mudpuppies"	
1988	Judith Moffett*	"Surviving", Pennterra	
1988	Rebecca Ore	"Projectile Weapons and Wild Alien Water"	
1988	Martha Soukup	"Dress Rehearsal"	
1988	C. S. Friedman	In Conquest Born	
1988	Loren J. MacGregor	The Net	
1989	Michaela Roessner*	Walkabout Woman	
1989	Delia Sherman	Through a Brazen Mirror	
1989	Christopher Hinz	Liege-Killer	
1989	Kristine Kathryn Rusch	"Sing"	
1989	Melanie Rawn	Dragon Prince	
1989	P. J. Beese	The Guardsman	
1989	Todd Cameron Hamilton	The Guardsman	
1989	William Sanders	Journey to Fusang	
1990	Kristine Kathryn Rusch*	"Sing"	
1990	Allen Steele	"Live from the Mars Hotel", Orbital Decay	
1990	Nancy A. Collins	Sunglasses After Dark	
1990	John G. Cramer	Twistor	
1990	Katherine Neville	The Eight	
1991	Julia Ecklar*	"The Music Box", The Kobayashi Maru	
1991	Nancy A. Collins	Sunglasses After Dark	
1991	John G. Cramer	Twistor	
1991	Michael Kandel	Strange Invasion, In Between Dragons	
1991	Scott Cupp	"Thirteen Days of Glory"	
1992	Ted Chiang*	"Tower of Babylon", "Understand"	
1992	Laura Resnick	"No Room for the Unicorn"	
1992	Barbara Delaplace	"Wings"	
1992	Michelle Sagara	Into the Dark Lands	
1992	Greer Ilene Gilman	Moonwise	
1993	Laura Resnick*	"No Room for the Unicorn"	
1993	Nicholas A. DiChario	"The Winterberry"	
1993	Barbara Delaplace	"Wings"	
1993	Michelle Sagara	Into the Dark Lands	
1993	Holly Lisle	Fire in the Mist	
1993	Carrie Richerson	"Apotheosis"	
1994	Amy Thomson*	Virtual Girl	
1994	Holly Lisle	Fire in the Mist	
1994	Carrie Richerson	"Apotheosis"	
1994	Elizabeth Willey	The Well-Favored Man	
1994	Jack Nimersheim	"A Fireside Chat"	
1995	Jeff Noon*	Vurt	
1995	Felicity Savage	"Ash Minette"	
1995	Linda J. Dunn	"Sibling Rivalry"	
1995	David Feintuch	Midshipman's Hope	
1995	Daniel Marcus	"Heart of Molten Stone"	
1996	David Feintuch*	Midshipman's Hope, Challenger's Hope	
1996	Felicity Savage	"Ash Minette"	
1996	Michael A. Burstein	"TeleAbsence"	
1996	Sharon Shinn	The Shape-Changer's Wife	
1996	Tricia Sullivan	Lethe	
1997	Michael A. Burstein*	"TeleAbsence"	
1997	Sharon Shinn	The Shape-Changer's Wife	
1997	Richard Garfinkle	Celestial Matters	
1997	Raphael Carter	The Fortunate Fall	
1997	Katya Reimann	Wind From a Foreign Sky	
1998	Mary Doria Russell*	The Sparrow	
1998	Susan R. Matthews	An Exchange of Hostages	
1998	Andy Duncan	"Beluthahatchie"	
1998	Richard Garfinkle	Celestial Matters	
1998	Raphael Carter	The Fortunate Fall	
1999	Nalo Hopkinson*	Brown Girl in the Ring	
1999	Kage Baker	In the Garden of Iden	
1999	Julie E. Czerneda	"First Contact"	
1999	Susan R. Matthews	An Exchange of Hostages	
1999	James Van Pelt	"The Big One"	
2000	Cory Doctorow*	"Craphound"	
2000	Ellen Klages	"Time Gypsy"	
2000	Shane Tourtellotte	"I Don't Know and I Don't Care"	
2000	Kristine Smith	Code of Conduct	
2000	Thomas Harlan	The Shadow of Ararat	
2001	Kristine Smith*	Code of Conduct	
2001	Jo Walton	The King's Peace	
2001	Thomas Harlan	The Shadow of Ararat	
2001	Douglas Smith	"State of Disorder"	
2001	James L. Cambias	"A Diagram of Rapture"	
2002	Jo Walton*	The King's Peace	
2002	Alexander C. Irvine	"Rossetti Song"	
2002	Ken Wharton	Divine Intervention	
2002	Wen Spencer	Alien Taste	
2002	Tobias S. Buckell	"Fish Merchant"	
2003	Wen Spencer*	Alien Taste	
2003	Charles Coleman Finlay	"The Political Officer"	
2003	Ken Wharton	Divine Intervention	
2003	Karin Lowachee	Warchild	
2003	David D. Levine	"Nucleon"	
2004	Jay Lake*	"Into the Gardens of Sweet Night"	
2004	David D. Levine	"Nucleon"	
2004	Karin Lowachee	Warchild	
2004	Tim Pratt	"Little Gods"	
2004	Chris Moriarty	Spin State	
2005	Elizabeth Bear*	Hammered	
2005	Steph Swainston	The Year of Our War	
2005	K. J. Bishop	The Etched City	
2005	Chris Roberson	"O One"	
2005	David Moles	"The Third Party"	
2006	John Scalzi*	Old Man's War	
2006	K. J. Bishop	The Etched City	
2006	Sarah Monette	Mélusine	
2006	Chris Roberson	"O One", Here, There & Everywhere	
2006	Brandon Sanderson	Elantris	
2006	Steph Swainston	The Year of Our War	
2007	Naomi Novik*	His Majesty's Dragon	
2007	Scott Lynch	The Lies of Locke Lamora	
2007	Sarah Monette	Mélusine	
2007	Brandon Sanderson	Elantris, Mistborn: The Final Empire	
2007	Lawrence M. Schoen	The Sky's the Limit	
2008	Mary Robinette Kowal*	"Portrait of Ari"	
2008	Scott Lynch	The Lies of Locke Lamora	
2008	David Louis Edelman	Infoquake	
2008	Joe Abercrombie	The Blade Itself	
2008	Jon Armstrong	Grey	
2008	David Anthony Durham	Acacia: The War with the Mein	
2009	David Anthony Durham*	Acacia: The War with the Mein	
2009	Aliette de Bodard	"Butterfly, Falling At Dawn"	
2009	Felix Gilman	Thunderer	
2009	Tony Pi	"Metamorphoses in Amber"	
2009	Gord Sellar	"Lester Young and the Jupiter's Moons' Blues"	
2010	Seanan McGuire*	Rosemary and Rue	
2010	Felix Gilman	Thunderer	
2010	Gail Carriger	Soulless	
2010	Lezli Robyn	"Soulmates"	
2010	Saladin Ahmed	"Hooves and the Hovel of Abdel Jameela"	
2011	Lev Grossman*	The Magicians	
2011	Saladin Ahmed	"Hooves and the Hovel of Abdel Jameela"	
2011	Lauren Beukes	Zoo City	
2011	Larry Correia	Monster Hunter International	
2011	Dan Wells	I Am Not a Serial Killer	
2012	E. Lily Yu*	"The Cartographer Wasps and the Anarchist Bees"	
2012	Mur Lafferty	"1963: The Argument Against Louis Pasteur"	
2012	Stina Leicht	Of Blood and Honey	
2012	Karen Lord	Redemption in Indigo	
2012	Brad R. Torgersen	"Ray of Light"	
2013	Mur Lafferty*	"1963: The Argument Against Louis Pasteur"	
2013	Zen Cho	The Perilous Life of Jade Yeo	
2013	Max Gladstone	Three Parts Dead	
2013	Stina Leicht	Of Blood and Honey, And Blue Skies From Pain	
2013	Chuck Wendig	Blackbirds	
2014	Sofia Samatar*	A Stranger in Olondria	
2014	Wesley Chu	The Lives of Tao	
2014	Max Gladstone	Three Parts Dead	
2014	Ramez Naam	Nexus	
2014	Benjanun Sriduangkaew	Chang'e Dashes from the Moon	
2015	Wesley Chu*	The Lives of Tao	
2015	Jason Cordova	Kaiju Apocalypse	
2015	Kary English	"Totaled"	
2015	Rolf Nelson	"Shakedown Cruise"	
2015	Eric S. Raymond	"Sucker Punch"	
2016	Andy Weir*	The Martian	
2016	Pierce Brown	Red Rising	
2016	Sebastien de Castell	Traitor's Blade	
2016	Brian Niemeier	Nethereal	
2016	Alyssa Wong	"The Fisher Queen", "Hungry Daughters of Starving Mothers"	
2017	Ada Palmer*	Too Like the Lightning	
2017	Sarah Gailey	"Haunted", "Of Blood and Bronze"	
2017	J. Mulrooney	An Equation of Almost Infinite Complexity	
2017	Malka Older	Infomocracy	
2017	Laurie Penny	Everything Belongs to the Future	
2017	Kelly Robson	"Waters of Versailles", "Two-Year Man", "The Three Resurrections of Jessica Churchill"	
2018	Rebecca Roanhorse*	"Welcome to Your Authentic Indian Experience™"	
2018	Katherine Arden	The Bear and the Nightingale	
2018	Sarah Kuhn	Heroine Complex	
2018	Jeannette Ng	Under the Pendulum Sun	
2018	Vina Jie-Min Prasad	"A Series of Steaks", "Fandom for Robots"	
2018	Rivers Solomon	An Unkindness of Ghosts	
2019	Jeannette Ng*	Under the Pendulum Sun	
2019	Katherine Arden	The Bear and the Nightingale	
2019	S. A. Chakraborty	The City of Brass	
2019	R. F. Kuang	The Poppy War	
2019	Vina Jie-Min Prasad	"A Series of Steaks", "Fandom for Robots"	
2019	Rivers Solomon	An Unkindness of Ghosts	
2020	R. F. Kuang*	The Poppy War	
2020	Sam Hawke	City of Lies	
2020	Jenn Lyons	The Ruin of Kings	
2020	Nibedita Sen	"Advice for Your First Time at the Faerie Market"	
2020	Tasha Suri	Empire of Sand	
2020	Emily Tesh	Silver in the Wood	
2021	Emily Tesh*	Silver in the Wood	
2021	Lindsay Ellis	Axiom's End	
2021	Simon Jimenez	The Vanished Birds	
2021	Micaiah Johnson	The Space Between Worlds	
2021	A. K. Larkwood	The Unspoken Name	
2021	Jenn Lyons	The Ruin of Kings	
2022	Shelley Parker-Chan*	She Who Became the Sun	
2022	Tracy Deonn	Legendborn	
2022	Micaiah Johnson	The Space Between Worlds	
2022	A. K. Larkwood	The Unspoken Name	
2022	Everina Maxwell	Winter's Orbit	
2022	Xiran Jay Zhao	Iron Widow	
2023	Travis Baldree*	Legends & Lattes	
2023	Naseem Jamnia	The Bruising of Qilwa	
2023	Isabel J. Kim	"Christopher Mills, Return to Sender"	
2023	Maijia Liu	Comes Slowly	
2023	Everina Maxwell	Ocean's Echo	
2023	Weimu Xin		
2024	Xiran Jay Zhao* (Note: Zhao's eligibility period was extended one year per request by Dell Magazines after Zhao was incorrectly ruled ineligible in their second year.)	Iron Widow	
2024	Moniquill Blackgoose	To Shape a Dragon's Breath	
2024	Sunyi Dean	The Book Eaters	
2024	Ai Jiang	"I AM AI"	
2024	Hannah Kaner	Godkiller	
2024	Em X. Liu	The Death I Gave Him	
2025	Moniquill Blackgoose*	To Shape a Dragon's Breath	
2025	Bethany Jacobs	These Burning Stars	
2025	Hannah Kaner	Godkiller	
2025	Angela Liu	"Contract of Ink and Skin"	
2025	Jared Pechaček	The West Passage	
2025	Tia Tashiro	"Mirage in Double Vision"	
2026	Antonia Hodgson*	The Raven Scholar	
2026	Sophie Burnham	Sargassa	
2026	Kamilah Cole	So Let Them Burn	
2026	Molly O'Neill	Greenteeth	
2026	H.H. Pak	"Scalp"	
2026	Jared Pechaček	The West Passage	

== Cited references ==
- Clute, John; Langford, David; Nicholls, Peter, ed. (2011). The Encyclopedia of Science Fiction (3rd ed.;). ESF Ltd.
