= Nebula Awards Showcase 2019 =

- Cover of first edition
- Editor: Silvia Moreno-Garcia
- Cover artist: Tiffany Dae
- Language: English
- Series: Nebula Awards Showcase
- Genre: Science fiction and fantasy
- Publisher: Parvus Press
- Publication date: 2019
- Publication place: United States
- Media type: Print (paperback), ebook
- Pages: 414
- ISBN: 978-1-73381-197-2
- OCLC: 1048430378
- Preceded by: Nebula Awards Showcase 2018
- Followed by: Nebula Awards Showcase 54

Nebula Awards Showcase 2019 is an anthology of science fiction and fantasy short works edited by Mexican-Canadian writer Silvia Moreno-Garcia, first published in trade paperback and ebook by Parvus Press in October 2019.

== Summary ==
The book collects pieces that won or were nominated for the Nebula Awards novella, novelette and short story for the year 2018 (presented in 2019), together with an introduction by the editor. Some non-winning stories nominated for the awards are omitted.

== Contents ==
- "Introduction" (Silvia Moreno-Garcia)
- "The 2018 Nebula Award Finalists"
- "Welcome to Your Authentic Indian Experience™" [Best short story winner, 2018] (Rebecca Roanhorse)
- "A Series of Steaks" [Best novelette nominee, 2018] (Vina Jie-Min Prasad)
- "Weaponized Math" [Best novelette nominee, 2018] (Jonathan P. Brazee)
- "Utopia, LOL?" [Best short story nominee, 2018] (Jamie Wahls)
- "Fandom for Robots" [Best short story nominee, 2018] (Vina Jie-Min Prasad)
- "All Systems Red" [Best novella winner, 2018] (Martha Wells)
- "Wind Will Rove" [Best novelette nominee, 2018] (Sarah Pinsker)
- "Dirty Old Town" [Best short story nominee, 2018] (Richard Bowes)
- "The Last Novelist (or A Dead Lizard in the Yard)" [Best short story nominee, 2018] (Matthew Kressel)
- "Carnival Nine" [Best short story nominee, 2018] (Caroline M. Yoachim)
- "Small Changes Over Long Periods of Time" [Best novelette nominee, 2018] (K. M. Szpara)
- "Clearly Lettered in a Mostly Steady Hand" [Best short story nominee, 2018] (Fran Wilde)
- "A Human Stain" [Best novelette winner, 2018] (Kelly Robson)
- "Biographies"
- "About the Science Fiction and Fantasy Writers of America (SFWA)"
- "About the Nebula Awards"
- "A Word from Parvus Press"

== Reception ==
John ONeill on blackgate.com writes "Silvia Moreno-Garcia's introduction is one of the most powerful non-fiction pieces I've read in a Nebula anthology in a long time, both a celebration of the increasing diversity in our field, and a bald statement about why it's so vitally important." He notes that "[t]his year's volume contains some magnificent material," highlighting the pieces by Roanhorse, Robson and Wells.
