= Murder By Magic =

2004 anthology edited by Rosemary Edghill

First edition

Murder by Magic is an anthology of short fantasy style stories made to be mysteries. It was published in 2004 by Aspect, a division of Warner Books, and was edited by Rosemary Edghill. It has a total of twenty stories, with the book broken down in five sections. Each story has a small bit of information on the author before the story itself.

== Part 1: Murder Most Modern ==
Piece of Mind by Jennifer Roberson: A divorced cop turned private detective gets a new neighbor with some dogs. He learns that she has the power to communicate with animals and asks her to help him on the case that he had been obsessed with that led to his divorce and leaving the police force.

Special Surprise Guest Appearance By... from Carole Nelson Douglas: When a former assistant shows up as a new stage magician named Majicka, a Las Vegas magician wonders about her newest trick. He offers to pay the sum of one million dollars to see how it worked. Enough money to have saved her son if he were still alive from the disease. Turns out the trick is not ALL mirrors.

Dopplegangster by Laura Resnik: Mobsters are being killed and turning up dead in strange ways. Shot in the chest through bulletproof vest and in rooms with one entrance that no one passed through. The strangest part of all, each of the victims see themselves shortly before they're killed.

Mixed Marriages Can Be Murder by Will Graham: Mr. and Mrs. Steele are a pair of private investigators hired to prevent a new program from being stolen before it can reach production. If someone is not careful, they may just find out that the loving couple are not always as sweet and charming as they always seem.

The Case of The Headless Corpse by Josepha Sherman: When the Randolph Dexter, head of Dexter Arcane Industries, is found dead with his head missing, it is up to agents Wren and Coyote of the Magical Bureau of Investigation to solve the case. When the killer turns out to be a monster from another dimension that is unaffected by magic, it's up to the agents to figure out how to send it home before it kills again.

== Part 2: Murder Unclassifiable ==
A Death in the Working by Debra Doyle: Set in an alternate reality and written as though it were a historical story from that realm. Inquestor-Principal Jerre syn-Casleyin is assigned to investigate the death of a mage whose brother believes did not die of natural causes as claimed, but was murdered for his money. (Additional note: Debra Doyle helped Rosemary Edghill come up with the idea for the book)

Cold Case by Diane Duane: Detective Sergeant Rob DeFalco has the ability to speak to ghosts and works on cases for the police where he speaks to the victims of the murder to solve the cases which have been put on hold for a while. He is assigned to discover the killer of Tamara Eldridge, but there's another death to be figured out.

Snake in the Grass by Susan R. Matthews: When Austin is killed by a Kinsey snake supposedly when performing the Taber rite, Galen is asked to catch the snake responsible. The god known as King Snake, however, wants Galen back, and hints that Austin was not responsible as it seemed.

Double Jeopardy by M.J. Hamilton: When Isadore is killed, and her amulet is stolen, it is up to her sister Lillith to keep reclaim the lost amulet so it's with her own, keep both of them from her cousin Morgan, and take the two amulets to a new set of twins so as to keep balance and harmony in the universe.

Witch Sight by Roberta Gellis: A young girl named Brenda is the only witch in town and in a school for girls. When the only girl who was her friend is killed, everyone is ready to blame her. Brenda has to convince the officers she is innocent and help figure out who is responsible for the murder.

Overrush by Laura Ann Gilman: An investigation of an insurance scam takes an unfortunate turn when a dead body is found. The body is of a wizard who is supposed to have gone insane. Stranger still is that the cause of death seems to be that he could not release the magic. The situation is made worse when another shows up with the same problem, unfortunately, he was not dead at the time.

== Part 3: Murder Most Genteel ==
Captured in Silver by Teresa Edgerton: First Minister Prosper de Rouille is killed and Lord High Constable Gabriel-Louis-Constant Jauscourt is sent to investigate. The problem, who was someone able to get into a locked room and kill the Minister without anyone see them come in or go out?

A Night at the Opera by Sharon Lee and Steve Miller: When a man by the name of Wolheim is found dead, Lord Nicholas Charles is asked to investigate. Lord Charles finds that someone has managed to cast a transformation spell on Wolheim a total of Eighty-five times. The strangest detail of all is that as he analyzes the spell, he finds nothing that gives a hint of who cast it on him.

A Tremble in the Air by James D. Macdonald: Mrs. Roger Collins believes she has seen a ghost. Mr. Orville Nesbit is sent for to investigate and help find out about the ghost. Unfortunately, no one believes Mrs. Collins since she has been sick. Things are made harder by Mr. Roger Collins who adamantly does not like Nesbit and wants him gone as soon as possible.

Murder Entailed by Susan Krinard: When Lord Roderick Featherstonehaugh is murdered during a party thrown by Lady Olivia Dowling. Olivia does not want to get the police involved and does not know why anyone would want to kill Lord Featherstonehaugh. It turns out though, that the lord was not as good as he seemed. Also, there's still the question of who did it and how they suffocated him.

== Part 4: Murder Fantastical ==
Dropping Hints by Lawrence Watt-Evans: When an unexpected event leads to a new Duke of Croy who was not ready for it, he decides to go to the wizard Rasec who is his neighbor and tries to make sure things will stay peaceful between them. While there, the wizard is killed by a homunculus, that happens to be one of five. The problem is that all five of them look exactly alike.

Au Purr by Esther Friesner: Alisande gets a note saying her sister Magda is dead. When she tells this to her demon servant Scalini, he vows on the left hoof of Vadryn the Venomous to take revenge. The problem is, he declares revenge on Magda's husband and kids. Alisande goes to visit her niece and nephew, then disguises herself as a cat to try to stop Scalini and discover the real killer.

Getting the Chair by Keith R.A. DeCandido: Lieutenant Torin ban Wyvald and Danthres Tresyllione are called to Unicorn Precinct to investigate a death. The case turns out to be the murder of a wizard. the magic test proves ineffective, but there are three witnesses. The strange thing is one is a lamp, one a chair and one a couch, all of which have been enchanted to talk. (Note: This story is set just before Dragon Precinct with the same characters)

== Part 5: Murder Most Modern ==
The Necromancer's Apprentice by Lillian Stewart Carl: When Amy Robsart Dudley dies, rumor spreads that her husband, Robert Dudley Master of the Queen's Horses, killed her, causing him to be banished from the Queen Elizabeth's court. Robert is forced to have Erasmus Pilbeam attempt to conjure Amy's spirit and help prove who is truly responsible. Things go awry, however, when Erasmus's apprentice breaks the circle and lets the ghost escape before she could be put to rest.

Grey Eminence by Mercedes Lackey: Nan Killian and Sarah Jane are both students at a girl's boarding school in England. Both of the girls have magical abilities with Sarah owning a pet African Grey parrot. The two are occasionally sent out to help in certain things where their special abilities would be of use. Nan manages to get a Raven on the way, but cannot communicate with it as well. One night they are summoned, but something is after them, that is quite dangerous.
