= Guy Snyder =

Guy Snyder may refer to:

- Guy Snyder (businessman) (1951–1999), American businessman
- Guy Snyder (writer) (born 1951), American science fiction writer
