= Jesse Miller =

Jesse Miller may refer to:

- Jesse Miller (musician) (1921–1950), American musician
- Jesse Miller (politician) (1800–1850), American politician
- Jesse Miller (writer), American writer
- Jesse S. Miller (1940–2006), American psychologist
- Jesse S. Miller (politician) (1865–1935), American politician from Ohio
- Jessie Miller, Australian aviator
