= Bonnie Jo Stufflebeam =

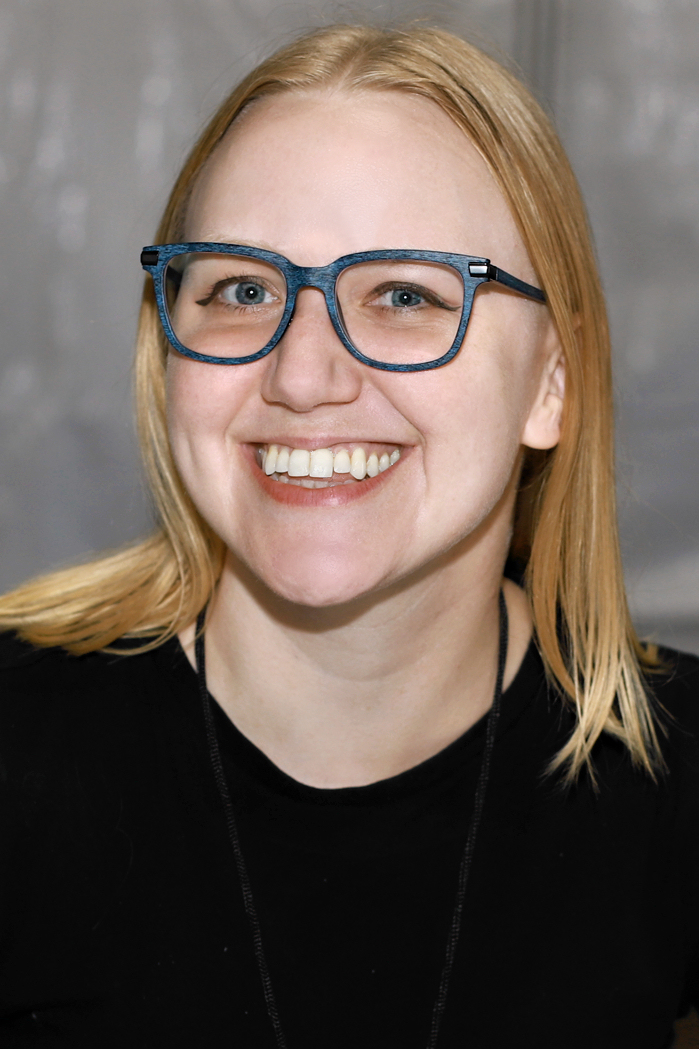
- Stufflebeam at the 2022 Texas Book Festival.
- Born: Texas
- Occupation: Author
- Writing career
- Genre: fantasy
- Website: bonniejostufflebeam.com

Bonnie Jo Stufflebeam is an American author of fantasy and horror fiction active since 2012.

== Biography ==
Stufflebeam is a native of Texas, where she currently resides after two years in Oregon. She received an MFA in creative writing from the University of Southern Maine in July 2013.

Stufflebeam has published over 90 short stories in various periodicals and anthologies, including Beneath Ceaseless Skies, Clarkesworld Magazine, Hobart, Lightspeed, The Masters Review, Monster Verse, Nebula Awards Showcase 2018, and The Toast. Her debut novel, Grim Root, was released in 2024.

== Bibliography ==
=== Novels ===
- Grim Root (2024)

=== Short fiction ===
- "They Come In Through the Walls" (2012)
- "The Wanderers" (2013)
- "The Siren" (2013)
- "An Exodus of Wings" (2013)
- "The Integrity of Broken Buildings" (2013)
- "Mrs. Stiltskin" (2013)
- "The Mammoth" (2013)
- "Spiders" (2013)
- "Old Boys" (2014)
- "The Damaged" (2014)
- "Killing Time" (2014)
- "Sleepers" (2014)
- "The Flight of the Red Monsters" (2014)
- "Scars" (2014)
- "The Foster Child" (2014)
- "Hero" (2014)
- "Skeletons" (2014)
- "Tea with the Titans" (2014)
- "They Come with the Carnival" (2014)
- "The Centaur's Daughter" (2015)
- "He Came from a Place of Openness and Truth" (2015)
- "Nostalgia" (2015)
- "Everything Beneath You" (2015)
- "Blight" (2015)
- "Six Ways to Break Her" (2015)
- "Doors" (2015)
- "Trickier with Each Translation" (2015)
- "The Girl with Golden Hair" (2015)
- "The Devil's Hands" (2015)
- "Sisters" (2015)
- "Sleeping with Spirits" (2015)
- "A Careful Fire" (2015)
- "Something Deadly, Something Dark" (2016)
- "The Orangery" (2016)
- "The Maneaters" (2017)
- "Needle Mouth" (2017)
- "Secret Keeper" (2017)
- "Ghost Town" (2017)
- "The Black Thumb" (2017)
- "The Greatest Discovery of Dr. Madeline Lightfoot" (2017)
- "Angry Kings" (2018)
- "So Easy" (2018)
- "The Men Who Come from Flowers" (2018)
- "The Crow Knight" (2018)

=== Poetry ===
- "The Werewolf" (2013)
- "Strange Monster" (2013)
- "Kites" (2014)
- "The Santa Monica Prophecies: A Collaborative Triptych" (with Layla Al-Bedawi, Holly Lyn Walrath, 2017)

=== Nonfiction ===
- "Stepping Through a Portal" (2014)
- "A World of Queer Imagination" (2015)
- "Best Short Fiction of 2014" (2015)
- "Editorial: Braving the Post-Apocalyptic Landscape" (Interzone no. 276, 2018)

== Awards ==
"Everything Beneath Your" received an honorable mention for the 2015 James Tiptree Jr. Award. "The Orangery" was nominated for the 2017 Nebula Award for Best Novelette. She has also placed or been short- or long-listed for the 2016 Selected Shorts/Electric Lit Stella Kupferberg Memorial Short Story Prize, the 2015 British Science Fiction Association Awards, the 2016 Texas Observer Short Story Contest, and the 2015 Doctor T. J. Eckleburg Review's Gertrude Stein Award in Fiction.
