= Nebula Awards Showcase 2018 =

- Cover of first edition
- Editor: Jane Yolen
- Cover artist: Galen Dara
- Language: English
- Series: Nebula Awards Showcase
- Genre: Science fiction and fantasy
- Publisher: Pyr
- Publication date: 2018
- Publication place: United States
- Media type: Print (paperback), ebook
- Pages: 320
- ISBN: 978-1-63388-504-2
- OCLC: 1011625458
- Preceded by: Nebula Awards Showcase 2017
- Followed by: Nebula Awards Showcase 2019

Nebula Awards Showcase 2018 is an anthology of science fiction and fantasy short works edited by American writer Jane Yolen. It was first published in trade paperback and ebook by Pyr in August 2018.

== Summary ==
The book collects pieces that won or were nominated for the Nebula Awards for best novel, novella, novelette and short story for the year 2016 (presented in 2017), as well as the novel that won the Andre Norton Award for that year and nonfiction pieces related to the awards, together with an introduction by the editor. The novels, the winning novella, and one of the novelette nominees are represented by excerpts; the non-winning pieces nominated for the Best Novel, Andre Norton Award and Best Novella are omitted.

== Contents ==
- "Introduction" (Jane Yolen)
- "About the Science Fiction and Fantasy Writers of America"
- "About the Nebula Awards"
- "2016 Nebula Awards Ballot"
- Nebula Award Nominees: Best Short Story
  - "A Fist of Permutations in Lightning and Wildflowers" (Alyssa Wong)
  - "Sabbath Wine" (Barbara Krasnoff)
  - "Things with Beards" (Sam J. Miller)
  - "Welcome to the Medical Clinic at the Interplanetary Relay Station / Hours Since the Last Patient Death: 0" (Caroline M. Yoachim)
  - "This Is Not a Wardrobe Door" (A. Merc Rustad)
  - "Our Talons Can Crush Galaxies" (Brooke Bolander)
- Nebula Award Winner: Best Short Story
  - "Seasons of Glass and Iron" (Amal El-Mohtar)
- Nebula Award Nominees: Best Novelette
  - "Excerpt from The Jewel and Her Lapidary" (Fran Wilde)
  - "Blood Grains Speak Through Memories" (Jason Sanford)
  - "Sooner or Later Everything Falls into the Sea" (Sarah Pinsker)
  - "The Orangery" (Bonnie Jo Stufflebeam)
  - "You'll Surely Drown Here If You Stay" (Alyssa Wong)
- Nebula Award Winner: Best Novelette
  - "The Long Fall Up" (William Ledbetter)
- Nebula Award Winner: Best Novella
  - "Excerpt from Every Heart a Doorway" (Seanan McGuire)
- Nebula Award Winner: Best Novel
  - "Excerpt from All the Birds in the Sky" (Charlie Jane Anders)
- "About the Andre Norton Award"
- Andre Norton Award for Young Adult Science Fiction and Fantasy
  - "Excerpt from Arabella of Mars" (David D. Levine)
- "Past Nebula Award Winners"
- "About the Editor"
- "About the Cover Artist"

== Reception ==
Lucy Lockley in Booklist, while observing that the editor calls 2016 "an odd year for the Nebulas," writes "Readers will enjoy this 'odd' variety of excellence." She notes "The entries embrace a spectrum of themes, including disastrous, apocalyptic, and dystopian events; spins on mythology and folk and fairy tales; and poignant stories about family." Singled out for particular comment are the contributions by Yoachim, Krasnoff, Sandford, and Stufflebeam.

The Bookwatch calls the anthology "an outstanding gathering of the finest new, upcoming sci-fi and fantasy writers" in a series "always ... highly recommended ... because it, quite simply, represents the creme de la creme of the genre's Nebula winners." The reviewer considers "[e]ach story ... outstanding and the diversity of the gathering as a whole introduces names readers may not be familiar with, from Alyssa Wong and A. Merc Rustad to Bonnie Jo Stufflebeam."

The anthology was also reviewed by Ian Hunter in Interzone no. 276, July/August 2018, and Norman Spinrad in Asimov's Science Fiction v. 43, no. 11/12, November/December 2019.
