= Everina Maxwell =

British writer of science fiction

- Born: 1988 (age 37–38); Brighton, England
- Occupation: Author
- Writing career
- Years active: 2016–present
- Genres: Science fiction; Space opera; LGBTQ romance; Fantasy; Romantasy
- Notable work: Winter's Orbit
- Notable awards: Alex Award (2022)
- Website: everinamaxwell.com

Everina Maxwell (born 1988) is an English author. Her debut science fiction novel Winter's Orbit (2021) received a Alex Award among other accolades. This was followed by Ocean's Echo (2022).

== Early life ==
Maxwell is from Brighton, Sussex. She spent her childhood reading science-fiction and fantasy books from a local library. In 2004 around age 16, Maxwell attempted to write her first book when she took part in NaNoWriMo. She was a member of a local Brighton theatre company as Everina Loane.

== Career ==
Under the username Avoliot, Maxwell began writing Livejournal segments of what would become her first novel in 2016 and uploaded them collectively into an original science fiction romance story titled The Course of Honour to the website Archive of Our Own (AO3) in 2017. She was then scouted by a literary agent, who helped her re-write it. Via a three-way auction and a book deal, Orbit Books in the UK and Tor Publishing Group in the U.S. acquired the rights to publish the story as Maxwell's debut novel Winter's Orbit in 2021. Described as queer romantic space opera, the novel follows Prince Kiem and Jainan. Where The Course of Honour focused on the romance, Winter's Orbit expanded on the science fiction elements. Winter's Orbit won an Alex Award and was shortlisted for a Bisexual Book Award, the Golden Tentacle at the Kitschies, and the Astounding Award for Best New Writer.

Maxwell's second science fiction romance novel Ocean's Echo followed in November 2022. The novel takes place in the same universe as Winter's Orbit and is not a direct sequel, following new characters Tennal and Surit. Ocean's Echo was shortlisted for a Romantic Novel Award in the Fantasy category as well as another Astounding Award.

Maxwell's third novel and first in the romantasy genre Call Me Traitor is set for a December 2026 release. She described it as a "sapphic Winter Soldier book".

== Personal life ==
Maxwell is queer. She lives in Yorkshire.

== Bibliography ==
- Winter's Orbit (2021)
- Ocean's Echo (2022)
- Call Me Traitor (2026)

== Accolades ==
Year	Award	Category	Title	Result	Ref.
2021	Bisexual Book Awards	Speculative Fiction	Winter's Orbit	Shortlisted	
2022	Alex Award		Winter's Orbit	Won	
2022	Kitschies	Golden Tentacle (Best New Novel)	Winter's Orbit	Shortlisted	
2022	Astounding Award for Best New Writer		Winter's Orbit	Shortlisted	
2023	Romantic Novel Awards	Fantasy	Ocean's Echo	Shortlisted	
2023	Astounding Award for Best New Writer		Ocean's Echo	Shortlisted	
