= Kristine Smith =

American science fiction and fantasy author

- Occupations: Novelist, short story author
- Writing career
- Pen name: Alex Gordon
- Genres: Science fiction, thriller
- Notable works: Jani Killian series, Gideon
- Website: www.kristine-smith.com www.alexgordon.net

Kristine Smith is an American science fiction and fantasy author. In 2001, she won the John W. Campbell Award for Best New Writer. She lives in northern Illinois.

In 2009, she donated her archive to the department of Rare Books and Special Collections at Northern Illinois University.

Since 2015, Smith has been publishing thrillers using the pseudonym "Alex Gordon."

== Novels ==
=== As Kristine Smith ===
- Code of Conduct (1999)
- Rules of Conflict (2000)
- Law of Survival (2001)
- Contact Imminent (2003)
- Endgame (2007)

=== As Alex Gordon ===
- Gideon (2015)
- Jericho (2016)
