= Laura Resnick =

American fantasy writer (born 1962)

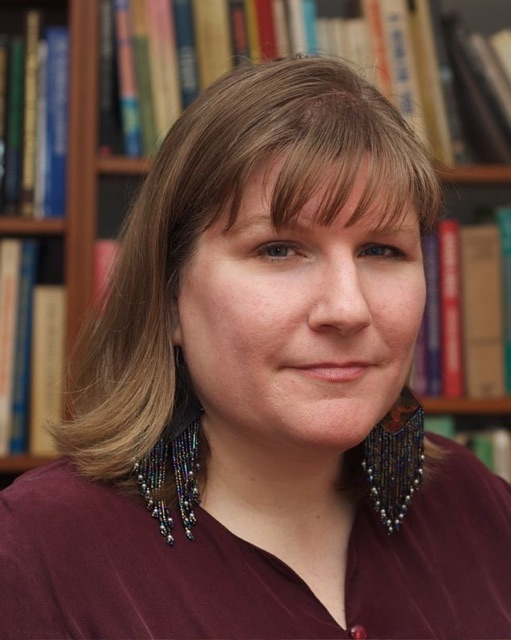
- Born: August 17, 1962 (age 64); Chicago, Illinois, U.S.
- Education: Georgetown University
- Occupation: Novelist
- Father: Mike Resnick
- Writing career
- Pen name: Laura Leone
- Genres: Fantasy; Romance
- Notable works: Esther Diamond Series; Chronicles of Siraka
- Website: lauraresnick.com

Laura Resnick (born August 17, 1962) is an American fantasy writer. She was the winner of the John W. Campbell Award for Best New Writer in Science Fiction for 1993. The daughter of science fiction author Mike Resnick, she formerly wrote romance novels under the pseudonym Laura Leone.

== Early life and education ==
Resnick was born in Chicago to Carol and Mike Resnick. The family moved to Cincinnati when she was young. She graduated from Georgetown and studied acting at the Webber Douglas Academy of Dramatic Art.

== Career ==
Resnick wrote romance novels for Harlequin for several years before switching to writing fantasy. Her first fantasy series, a trilogy titled The Chronicles of Sirkara, were reviewed by Publishers Weekly, the final two books with starred reviews.

== Awards ==
- Romantic Times Magazine Award 1989
- Romantic Times Magazine Award 1993
- John W. Campbell Award 1993
- Rita Award finalist, 2004
- Romantic Times Magazine Award 2004

== Selected Bibliography ==
=== Novels ===
The Esther Diamond Series

- Disappearing Nightly (Luna Books, 2005; reissued DAW Books, 2012)
- Doppelgangster (DAW Books, 2010)
- Unsympathetic Magic (DAW Books, 2010)
- Vamparazzi (DAW Books, 2011)
- Polterheist (DAW Books, 2012)
- The Misfortune Cookie (DAW Books, 2013)
- Abracadaver (DAW Books, Nov 2014)
- Goldzilla (DAW Books, TBA)

The Chronicles of Sirkara

"The Silerian Trilogy"

- In Legend Born (Tor Books, 1998)
- The White Dragon (Tor Books, 2003)
- The Destroyer Goddess (Tor Books, 2003)

Media Tie-In

- The Purifying Fire (A Magic: The Gathering based novel, Wizards of the Coast, July 2009)

Romance novels (written as Laura Leone)

- One Sultry Summer (Silhouette Books, 1989)
- A Wilder Name (Silhouette Books, 1989)
- Ulterior Motives (Silhouette Books, 1989)
- Guilty Secrets (Silhouette Books, 1990)
- A Woman's Work (Silhouette Books, 1990)
- Upon A Midnight Clear (Silhouette Books, 1990)
- The Black Sheep (Silhouette Books, 1991)
- Celestial Bodies (Silhouette Books, 1991)
- The Bandit King (Silhouette Books, 1991)
- Untouched By Man (Silhouette Books, 1992)
- Under The Voodoo Moon (Silhouette Books, 1993)
- Sleight of Hand (Meteor/Kismet, 1993)
- Fever Dreams (Kensington Books, 1997)
- Nights of Fire (Ellora's Cave, 2004)
- Fallen From Grace (Five Star, 2003)

=== Non-fiction ===
Books

- A Blonde in Africa (Alexander Books, 1997)
- Rejection, Romance, and Royalties: The Wacky World of a Working Writer (Jefferson Press, 2007)
