= Persephone Station =

Novel by Stina Leicht

- First edition
- Author: Stina Leicht
- Language: English
- Genre: Science fiction
- Publisher: Saga Press
- Publication place: United States

Persephone Station is a 2021 science fiction novel by Stina Leicht.

== Themes ==
The novel has been noted for its almost entirely female or non-binary cast, as well as featuring multiple queer characters. Leicht has stated that she was inspired to write the book after being disappointed by the lack of diversity in the 2016 The Magnificent Seven.

== Reception ==
Several reviewers commented on the pacing of the book, with Jason Sheehan of NPR stating that "after the thumping shocks of the opening, the middlegame happens in a kind of vacuum without propulsion and without stakes." However, those reviewers also often highlighted the characters as one of the strengths of the novel, with Ralph Harris of BookPage stating that "After crafting such heartfelt attachment to its characters, Persephone Station gifts the reader with a positive, entertaining story of grit and determination in which the will to do good prevails despite great cost."

The Chicago Review of Books stated that the novel "feels important now, as exploitation and violence continue on our planet."
