= Susan C. Petrey =

American fantasy writer (1945–1980)

Susan Candace Petrey (7 April 1945 – 5 December 1980) was an American writer of fantasy short fiction.

== Biography ==
Born in Seattle, Petrey worked as a medical technologist at Oregon State University, after obtaining a degree in microbiology. Described as an "intensely private person," Petrey was married to a fellow academic in 1967, and divorced in 1970. She rarely shared details of her personal life with peers.

Most of her writing took place in a setting involving "gentle healing vampires", the Varkela. Only three of her stories were professionally published during her lifetime. More of her work appeared in the posthumous collection Gifts of Blood in 1990. In 1981, she was nominated, also posthumously, for the John W. Campbell Award for Best New Writer, and her story "Spidersong" was nominated for the Hugo Award.

Petrey was active in the Portland, Oregon science fiction fandom. A group of her friends established the Susan C. Petrey Clarion Scholarship Fund in her memory. The fund annually raised money to send aspiring writers to the Clarion Workshop, until the fund was ended in 2023. Some of the writers it supported in the forty-three years it ran include Ted Chiang, Corey Doctorow, Samuel R. Delany, Carmen Maria Machado and Karen Joy Fowler.
