= Alexis A. Gilliland =

American novelist

Alexis Arnaldus Gilliland (born August 10, 1931, in Bangor, Maine) is an American science fiction writer and cartoonist. He resides in Arlington, Virginia.

Gilliland won the John W. Campbell Award for Best New Writer in 1982, notably beating David Brin and Michael Swanwick for the honor. Gilliland also won four Hugo Awards for Best Fan Artist (1980, 1983, 1984, 1985), the Rotsler Award (Lifetime Achievement in Fan Cartooning) in 2006, and the Tucker Award (for Excellence in Partying) in 1988.

He (together with his first wife Dolly until she died in 1991) hosted meetings of science fiction fans in his home approximately once a month from November 1967 until July 2006, and twice monthly after. In 1993 he married Lee Uba (née Elisabeth Swanson).

== Bibliography ==
=== Novels ===
- Rosinante
  - Revolution from Rosinante (1981)
  - Long Shot for Rosinante (1981)
  - The Pirates of Rosinante (1982)
- The End of the Empire (1983)
- Wizenbeak (a fantasy trilogy)
  - Wizenbeak (1986)
  - The Shadow Shaia (1990)
  - The Lord of the Troll-Bats (1992)

=== Short-stories ===
- Demarche to Iran (1992) (collected in Mike Resnick's alternate history anthology Alternate Presidents)
