= Robert Lester Stallman =

American novelist

- Born: January 6, 1930; Kankakee, Illinois, USA
- Died: August 6, 1980 (aged 50); Kalamazoo, Michigan, USA
- Occupations: Author; educator; critic
- Writing career
- Genre: speculative fiction

Robert Lester Stallman (6 January 1930 – 1 August 1980) was an American literary critic, professor of English, and author of The Book of the Beast science-fiction trilogy. He wrote under the name of Robert L. Stallman in his academic writings, and Robert Stallman for his fiction.

== Early life and education ==
Stallman was born in Kankakee, Illinois, the son of Otto John Melvin Stallman and Martha Elizabeth (Lester) Stallman. Stallman was raised in the vicinity of Kankakee, where his father worked as a grainer in a bed factory. Following graduation from high school, Stallman served in the US Army for two years, from 16 September 1952 to 7 September 1954.

Following his military service, Stallman enrolled in the English program at University of Chicago, where he received a bachelor's degree in English in 1957. He enrolled in further studies at University of New Mexico, where he earned an M.S. in 1961, basing his thesis on D.H. Lawrence. He then moved to University of Oregon, where he earned his Ph.D. in 1966. His dissertation was titled The Quest of William Morris.

== Teaching career ==
Following graduation, Stallman was hired as assistant professor of English at Western Michigan University in Kalamazoo, Michigan, Stallman was an authority on William Morris, as per his doctoral thesis The Quest of William Morris (Eugene, Oregon: University of Oregon Press, 1966). and various articles published in professional journals.

== Literary career ==
In his spare time, Stallman wrote a long science fiction novel that he titled The Book of the Beast. In 1980, he signed a deal with the science-fiction division of Pocket Books, which would see his novel published as a series of three books. Shortly afterwards, Stallman died, and The Book of the Beast trilogy was released posthumously.

== Reception ==
According to Peter Nicholls, Stallman's trilogy was "an engrossing series" of "complex, sensitively written Fabulations, fitting between the generic borders of sf and Horror, and update the myth of the Werewolf with [an] sf premise." However, Nicholls found the final volume "awkwardly structured," judging that it "needed a auctorial revision which it could not be given" due to Stallman's premature death.

In Issue 21 of Abyss, Dave Nalle also found the final book of the trilogy "really doesn't stand well on its own", but overall, found that in the trilogy, "Stallman's greatest achievements are in characterization and the expression of the emotions of the personas which the beast creates as it lives among humans. His background characters are amazingly well drawn, and he goes so far with the beast that its personality is complex almost beyond assimilation. It is a joy to read about these people, because they are real." Nalle concluded, "This series is phenomenal."

== Awards ==
=== 1981 ===
- Stallman was nominated for the John W. Campbell Award for Best New Writer, placing fifth.
- Stallman's first novel The Orphan
  - was nominated for the Nebula Award for Best Novel.
  - was nominated for the Balrog Award for Best Novel
  - placed second in the Locus Poll Award for Best First Novel
  - placed seventeenth in the Locus Poll Award for Best Fantasy Novel

=== 1982 ===
- Stallman's second novel, The Captive, placed fifth in the Locus Poll Award for Best Fantasy Novel.

== Bibliography ==
=== Book of the Beast trilogy ===
- The Orphan (1980)
- The Captive (1981)
- The Beast (1982)

=== Nonfiction ===
- The Quest of William Morris (Eugene, Oregon: University of Oregon Press, 1966).
- "On Not Talking: An Experience in Teaching Poetry" in College English v. 36, no. 1 (Sep. 1974), pp. 32–39.
- "The Lovers' Progress: An Investigation of William Morris' 'The Defence of Guenevere' and 'King Arthur's Tomb'" in SEL: Studies in English Literature 1500–1900 v. 15, no. 4 (Autumn 1975), pp. 657–70.
- "Poetry without Fear" in The Journal of Aesthetic Education v. 12, no. 3 (July 1978), pp. 23–32.
- "Rapunzel Unravelled" in Victorian Poetry v. 7, no. 3 (Autumn 1979), pp. 221–32.
