= Michaela Roessner =

American visual artist and science fiction author

Michaela-Marie Roessner-Hermann
- Born: January 27, 1950 (age 75); San Francisco, US

Michaela-Marie Roessner-Hermann (born January 27, 1950) is an American science-fiction writer publishing under the name Michaela Roessner.

== Biography ==
Born in San Francisco, she was raised in California, New York, Pennsylvania, Thailand, and Oregon. Trained as a visual artist, she holds a BFA in Ceramics from the California College of Arts and Crafts and an MFA in Painting from Lone Mountain College, and exhibits under the name M. M. Roessner-Herman. In 1989, she won the John W. Campbell Award for Best New Writer.

Her first novel, Walkabout Woman, was a 1989 nominee for the Mythopoeic Award, and won the Crawford Award. She has also published the science fiction novel Vanishing Point and number of short stories, published in Asimov's Science Fiction Magazine, SciFiction, Omni Online, Strange Plasma, Fantasy & Science Fiction, and elsewhere. She is also the author of two historical novels, The Stars Dispose (1997) and The Stars Compel (1999), about Catherine de Medici. She lives in southern California.

She has taught at the Clarion Workshop at Michigan State University and the Gotham Writers' Workshop.

== Awards ==
- 1989, John W. Campbell Award for Best New Writer

== Bibliography ==
- Walkabout Woman (1988)
- Vanishing Point (1993)
- The Stars Dispose (1997)
- The Stars Compel (1999)
