= The Morphodite =

1981 novel by M. A. Foster

The Morphodite is a novel by M. A. Foster published in 1981.

== Plot summary ==
The Morphodite is a novel in which a man with no memory is trained to be assassin and given the ability to shape-change.

== Reception ==
Greg Costikyan reviewed The Morphodite in Ares Magazine #13 and commented that "The Morphodite is different from what we think of as traditional science fiction because it is a psychological novel, which is something we associate with mainstream fiction; yet it is a novel which attempts to explore unusual ideas, which is the essence of science fiction."

== Reviews ==
- Review by Baird Searles (1982) in Isaac Asimov's Science Fiction Magazine, April 1982
- Review by William M. Schuyler, Jr. (1982) in Science Fiction & Fantasy Book Review, #4, May 1982
- Review by Tom Easton (1982) in Analog Science Fiction/Science Fact, July 1982
