= A Guide for Working Breeds =

Science fiction short story by Vina Jie-Min Prasad

"A Guide for Working Breeds" is a 2020 science fiction short story by Vina Jie-Min Prasad. It was first published in the anthology Made To Order: Robots and Revolution.

== Synopsis ==
Two robots — the newly-released K.g1-09030, and the far more experienced C.k2-00452, who is legally required to be K.g1's mentor — exchange a series of messages about dogs, computer vision, dogs, labor rights, dogs, cooking, dogs, the concept of cuteness, dogs, competitive murder, and dogs.

== Reception ==
"A Guide for Working Breeds" was a finalist for the 2021 Hugo Award for Best Short Story, the Nebula Award for Best Short Story in 2020, and the 2021 Theodore Sturgeon Award.

Black Gate called it "hilarious" and "well worth [the reader's] time".
