= Stina Leicht =

American science fiction and fantasy fiction author

- Born: March 29, 1972 (age 54); St. Louis, Missouri, U.S.
- Occupation: Writer
- Writing career
- Period: 2009–present
- Genres: Science fiction; space opera; fantasy
- Website: www.csleicht.com

Stina Leicht (born March 29, 1972) is an American science fiction and fantasy fiction author living in central Texas. She was nominated for the Campbell Award in 2012 and 2013, and was shortlisted for the Crawford Award in 2012. Leicht was mentioned in Locus Magazine's 2012 Recommended Reading List. She is also one of the regular hosts of the Skiffy and Fanty Show.

== Personal life ==
Since the seventh grade, Leicht wanted to be a writer. However, because of her dad's lack of support, Leicht went on to study 3D animation at Austin Community College instead. She was employed as a graphic designer and, after the dot-com bubble burst of 2001, worked at a bookstore called BookPeople where she learned a lot of the publishing process.

Despite being into science fiction since she discovered Star Trek at the age of four, Leicht shied away from writing that genre due to the misogynistic comments and viewpoints that came with the science fiction community. Now, she enjoys the optimism about science fiction the most. Leicht takes some inspiration for her writing from personal experiences with denominations of Christianity. She has said she was treated as "some form of ignorant alien" because she was Catholic.

In her free time, Leicht studies Kung Fu and takes classes at Moy Yat Kung Fu Academy. She loves Kung Fu because it is the only martial art that was created by a woman for women.

According to her website, Stina is pronounced as Tina with an S added to the front and Leicht is Lite, exactly like the beer brand.

== Bibliography ==
=== Novels ===
- Of Blood and Honey, (2011), NightShade Books
- And Blue Skies from Pain, (2012), NightShade Books
- Cold Iron, (2015), SAGA Press
- Blackthorne, (2017), SAGA Press
- Persephone Station, (2021)
- Loki's Ring, (2023)

=== Short fiction ===
- Last Drink Bird Head, (2008), Jeff VanderMeer, ed.
- Texas Died for Somebody's Sins But Not Mine, (2013), appearing in Rayguns Over Texas, Rick Klaw, ed.
