= Sophie Burnham =

American novelist

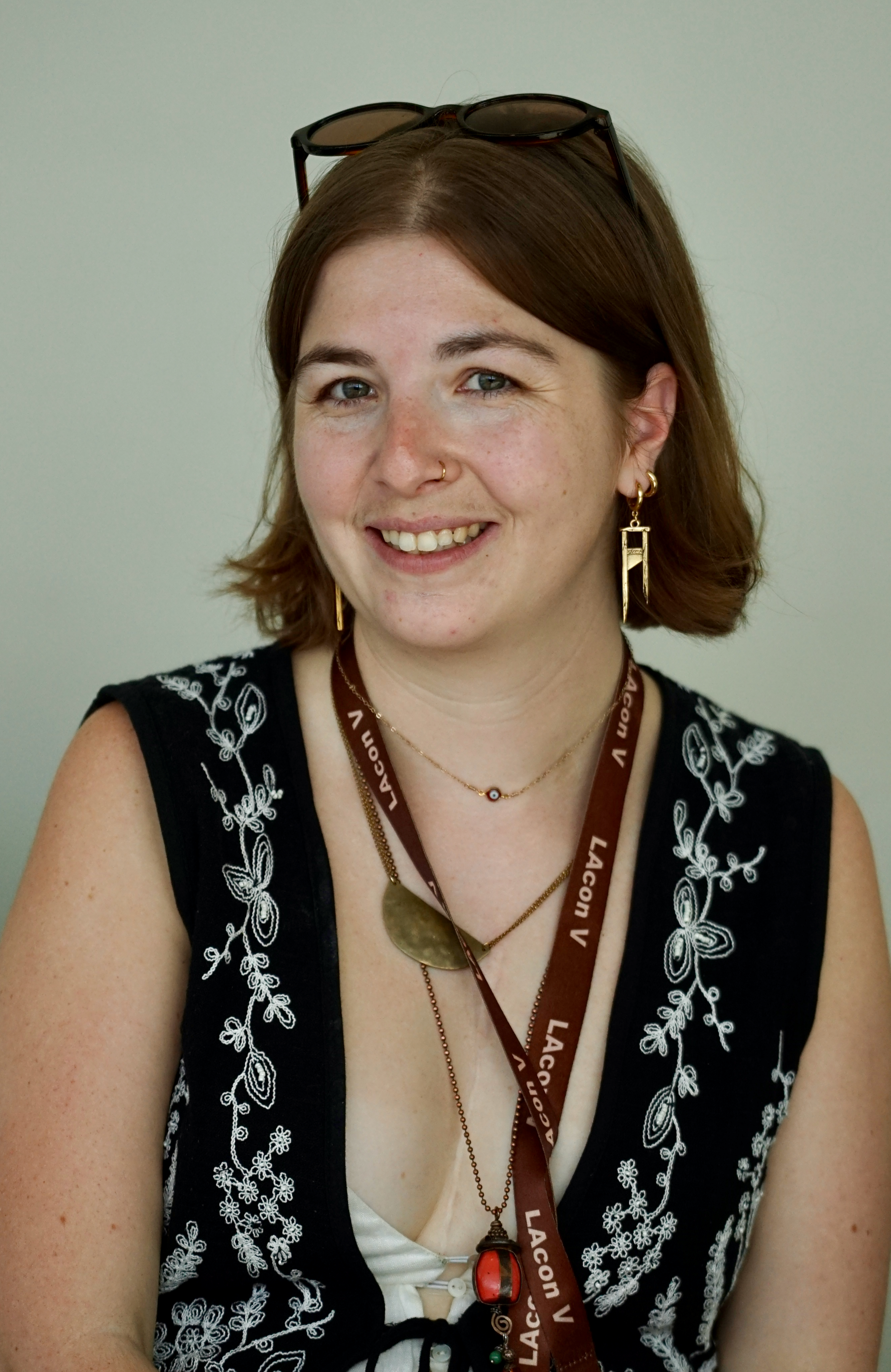
- Burnham at Worldcon 2026
- Born: February 19, 1993 (age 33); Providence, Rhode Island, USA
- Education: Syracuse University (BFA)
- Occupation: Writer
- Relatives: Bob Balaban (cousin); Leonard "Red" Balaban (Grandfather); Barney Balaban (Great-grandfather)
- Writing career
- Period: 2017 – Present
- Website: www.sophieburnham.com

Sophie Burnham (born 1993) is an American science fiction and fantasy novelist. Their debut novel, Sargassa (2024), the first in the Ex Romana trilogy, won the Sidewise Award for Alternate History.

Burnham is non-binary and currently lives in Edinburgh, where they are pursuing an MSc in Narrative Futures at the University of Edinburgh.

== Early life and education ==
Burnham is from Rhode Island and attended the Moses Brown School in Providence. They graduated with a BFA in Acting from Syracuse University in 2016.

== Career ==
From 2017 to 2021, Burnham lived and worked in the Los Angeles. They were a founding member of feminist theater collective We the Women and worked in film development at Amazon Studios and AGC Studios. They went on to become a script doctor and screenwriter for various projects at AGC and Lionsgate, as well as working briefly as Lucy Tcherniak’s director’s assistant.

In 2023, DAW Books acquired the rights to publish Burnham’s debut speculative fiction trilogy Ex Romana. The first book in the series, Sargassa, was published in 2024 to high critical acclaim. The novel won the 2024 Sidewise Award for Alternate History — Longform, as well as being shortlisted for the 2025 Locus Award for Best First Novel.

Burnham was also longlisted for the Astounding Award for Best New Writer in 2025.

Bayard Presse acquired the rights to publish the Ex Romana trilogy in French, with the first book released in April 2026.

Sargassa was followed by Bloodtide in 2025. The third and final installment in the trilogy is expected in 2027.

Burnham was a finalist for the Astounding Award for Best New Writer in 2026.

== Bibliography ==
- Ex Romana Trilogy
  - Sargassa (2024)
  - Bloodtide (2025)
  - Dawnlands (expected 2027)

== Awards & Accolades ==
Year	Work	Award	Result	Ref
2024	Sargassa	Sidewise Award for Alternate History - Longform	Won	
2025	Sargassa	Locus Awards - Best First Novel	Shortlisted	
2025	—	Astounding Award for Best New Writer	Nominated (14th)	
2026	—	Astounding Award for Best New Writer	Finalist	
