= Antonia Hodgson =

British writer and publisher

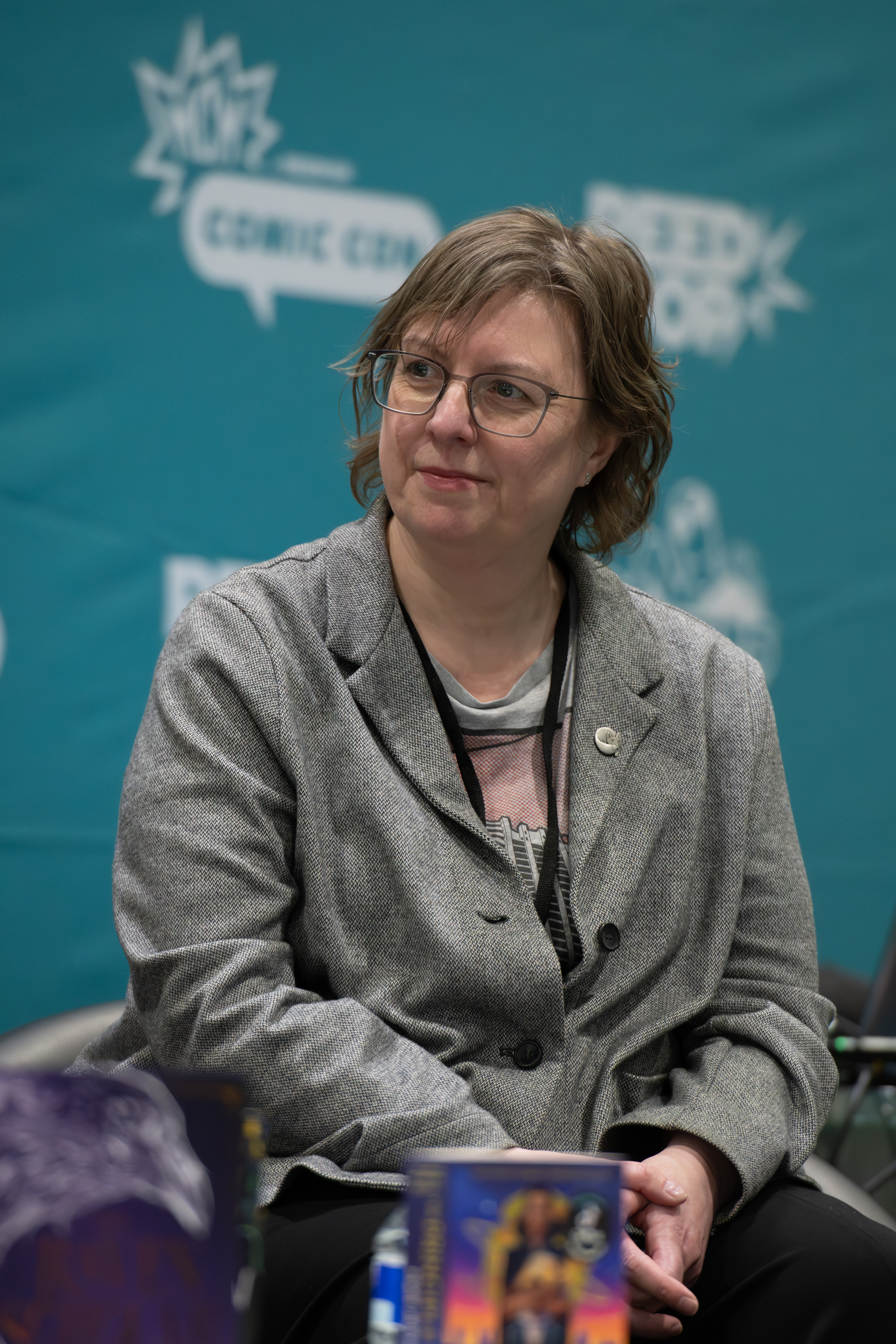
- Hodgson at MCM London Comic Con, May 2025
- Born: 1971 (age 54–55); Derby, Derbyshire, England
- Education: Littleover Community School and Leeds University
- Occupations: Publisher and writer
- Notable work: A Devil in the Marshalsea; The Raven Scholar

Antonia Hodgson (born 1971) is a British writer and publisher. She is the author of four acclaimed historical crime novels and one fantasy novel. In 2026, she was awarded the Astounding Award for Best New Writer.

== Early life and education ==
Hodgson was born in Derby in 1971. She attended Littleover Community School. She graduated with a degree in English Literature from Leeds University in 1994 and she went to work for Harcourt, Brace.

== Career ==
Hodgson spent nearly twenty years in the publishing business rising to editor-in-chief at Little, Brown before she published her own first novel.

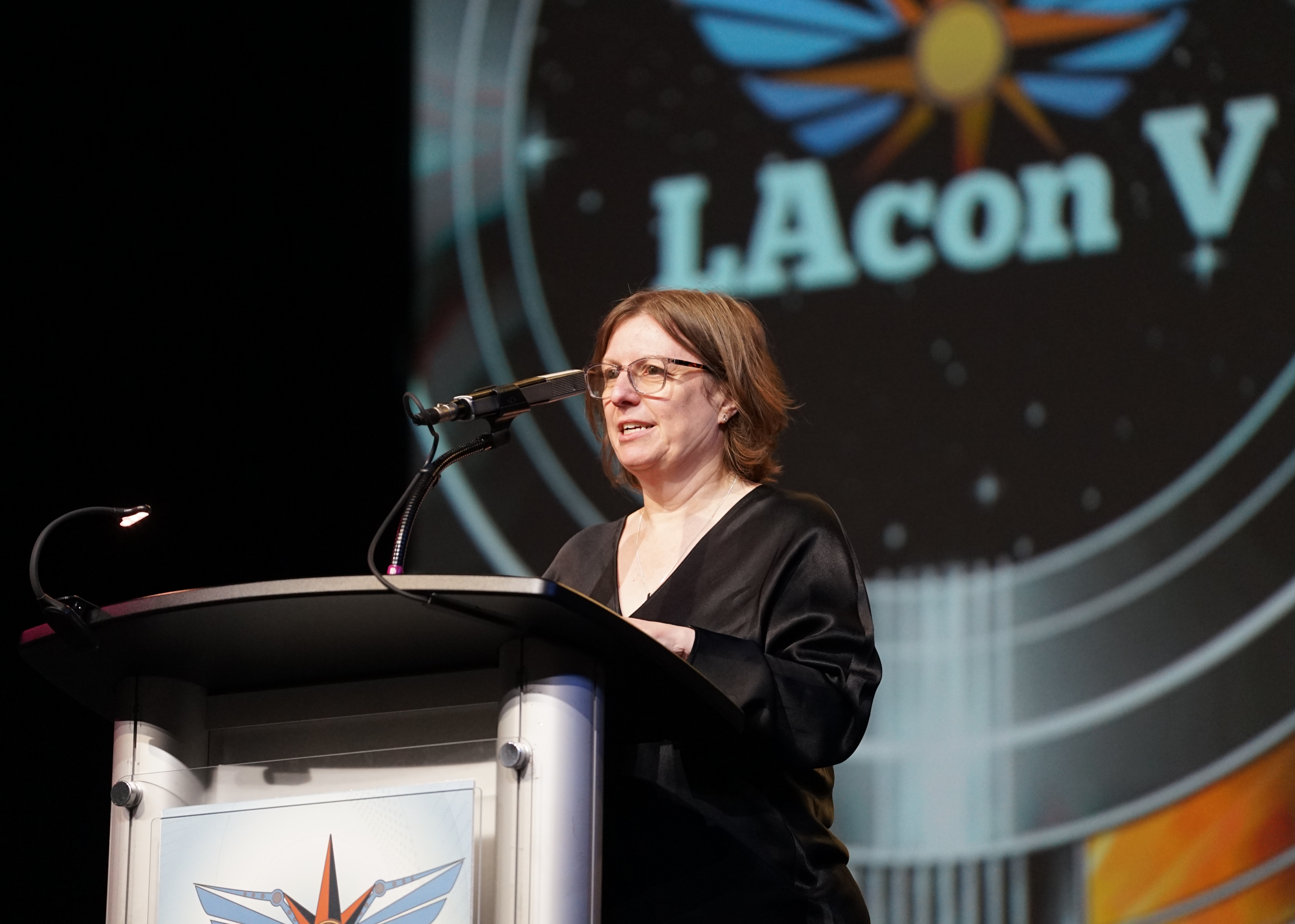
Hodgson accepting the 2026 Astounding Award for Best New Writer.

Hodgson's first novel, A Devil in the Marshalsea, published in 2014, is the first in a series about a character named Tom Hawkins. The novel is set in the time of the early Georgians, William Hogarth and the Southwark prison the Marshalsea. Hodgson believes that the Georgian period was more intriguing than the Victorian era which is usually considered to be more culturally important. The book was submitted anonymously to the publishers, Hodder & Stoughton, because she was known in the publishing industry. The book won the 2014 Crime Writers' Association's Historical Dagger Award and was shortlisted for the CWA New Blood Dagger Award. It was also shortlisted for the 2015 Theakston Old Peculier Crime Novel of the Year Award.

Hodgson's second novel, The Last Confession of Thomas Hawkins, received a starred review from Kirkus Reviews. The fourth novel in the series, The Silver Collar, was shortlisted for the Historical Writers' Association 2021 HWA Gold Crown.

Hodgson's fifth book and first fantasy novel, The Raven Scholar, was published in 2025 by Orbit Books. It was a finalist for the 2026 Hugo Award for Best Novel. It is the first book in a fantasy trilogy called The Eternal Path. The trilogy's second book, The Fox in Winter, is set to be released October 5, 2027.

== Bibliography ==
- Thomas Hawkins Series
  - The Devil in the Marshalsea. Hodder & Stoughton. 2014. ISBN 9781444775440.
  - The Last Confession of Thomas Hawkins. Hodder & Stoughton. 2015. ISBN 9781444775457.
  - A Death at Fountains Abbey. Hodder & Stoughton. 2016. ISBN 9781473615090.
  - The Silver Collar. Hodder & Stoughton. 2020. ISBN 9781473615137.
- The Eternal Path Trilogy
  - The Raven Scholar. Orbit Books/Hodderscape. 2025. ISBN 9781529339901.
  - The Fox in Winter. Orbit Books/Hodderscape. 2027. ISBN 9781529339925.

== Awards and nominations ==
Year	Work	Award	Category	Result	Ref.
2014	A Devil in the Marshalsea	Crime Writers' Association	Historical Dagger	Won	
2014	A Devil in the Marshalsea	Crime Writers' Association	New Blood Dagger	Shortlisted	
2015	A Devil in the Marshalsea	Theakston Old Peculier Crime Novel of the Year	—	Shortlisted	
2021	The Silver Collar	Historical Writers' Association Crown Awards	HWA Gold Crown	Shortlisted	
2026	—	Astounding Award for Best New Writer	—	Won	
2026	The Raven Scholar	Compton Crook Award	—	Finalist	
2026	The Raven Scholar	Hugo Award	Novel	Finalist	
