= David Feintuch =

American novelist (1944–2006)

- Born: July 21, 1944; New York City, U.S.
- Died: March 16, 2006 (aged 61); Mason, Michigan, U.S.
- Education: Earlham College; Harvard Law School
- Occupations: Attorney, author
- Writing career
- Notable awards: John W. Campbell Award for Best New Writer in Science Fiction; 1996

David Feintuch (July 21, 1944 – March 16, 2006) was a science fiction and fantasy author and attorney.

== Life and career ==
Feintuch was the 1996 winner of the John W. Campbell Award for Best New Writer in Science Fiction. He wrote one major science fiction series, the Seafort Saga, and a fantasy series, Rodrigo of Caledon. Feintuch's literary works have been recognized and highlighted at Michigan State University in their Michigan Writers Series.

The Seafort Saga is a military space opera series revolving around the character Nicholas Seafort, an officer in the UNNS. The books are set in a future human society that is largely dominated by unified Christianity. The main protagonist is a naval officer who strives always to do his duty, both to the navy and to his God, at great personal cost. The series and main character are inspired by C. S. Forester's novels about Horatio Hornblower. Shortly before his death, the author announced on his website that an eighth book, Galahad's Hope, had been completed and was in the publication stage; its current status is unknown. Books in the Seafort Saga have been translated into Russian, German, Japanese, Spanish and Czech (published by Talpress).

== Published works ==
=== Seafort Saga ===
1. Midshipman's Hope (1994)
2. Challenger's Hope (1995)
3. Prisoner's Hope (1995)
4. Fisherman's Hope (1996)
5. Voices of Hope (1996)
6. Patriarch's Hope (1999)
7. Children of Hope (2001)

=== Rodrigo of Caledon ===
1. The Still (1997) ISBN 0-446-67285-8 (Time Warner trade paperback) ISBN 0-446-60551-4 (1998 Aspect paperback) ISBN 1-85723-597-5 (Orbit paperback)
2. The King (2002) ISBN 0-441-00902-6 (Ace hardcover) ISBN 0-441-01037-7 (2003 Ace paperback)
