= Blackbirds (Wendig novel) =

2012 novel by Chuck Wendig

- Author: Chuck Wendig
- Cover artist: Joey Hi-Fi
- Language: English
- Genre: noir/urban fantasy
- Publisher: Angry Robot
- Publication date: 2012

Blackbirds is a 2012 noir/urban fantasy novel by Chuck Wendig. It was first published by Angry Robot.

== Synopsis ==
Whenever Miriam Black makes skin contact with someone for the first time, she sees how and when they will die. As a result, she is unable to function in society, and has become a drifter. When a man picks her up while hitchhiking, and she sees that she will be present at the time of his violent death 30 days later, she begins trying to change the future.

== Reception ==
Kirkus Reviews considered Blackbirds to be "delightfully vicious and bloody" with "an engaging blend of occult surrealism, nihilism, and startling violence", but conceded that the book's "pyrotechnic profanity, bloody ultraviolence, and lack of romance", as well as its "Tarantino-esque" multiple viewpoints, may not appeal to all readers. Publishers Weekly called it "[v]isceral and often brutal", noting its "emotional rawness".

Tor.com praised it as "consistently captivating and a pure, dark delight" and "immensely entertaining", but emphasized that Miriam is "an opportunistic, bitter, abrasive loner who takes advantage of people who are about to die", and that the book may not be enjoyed by people who "prefer likeable characters". In The Guardian, Keith Brooke lauded it as "fast-paced" with a "clever interweaving of viewpoints and flashback", which was, however, "occasionally rough round the edges".

== Adaptation ==
In 2014, Starz planned an adaptation of Blackbirds, to be produced by John Shiban; however, in 2015, Wendig announced that the adaptation would not proceed.
