= Susan R. Matthews =

American science fiction writer (born 1952)

- Born: July 1952 (age 74); Fort Benning, Georgia, U.S.
- Education: Seattle University (MBA)
- Occupation: Writer
- Writing career
- Genre: Science fiction
- Website: www.susanrmatthews.com

Susan R. Matthews (born July 1952) is an American science fiction writer.

Matthews was born in Fort Benning, Georgia. She lives in Seattle. She served in the US Army as operations and security officer of a Combat Support Hospital, later worked as an auditor for Boeing and graduated from Seattle University with an MBA in accounting.

Her debut novel, An Exchange of Hostages, was published by Avon Books in 1997. It was nominated for the 1997 Philip K. Dick Award and for the 1998 John W. Campbell Award for Best New Writer; it also obtained fourth place in the poll for the 1998 Locus Award for Best First Novel. Like its sequels, An Exchange of Hostages is set in a dystopic space opera future ruled by an autocratic judiciary. The novel and most of its sequels follow Andrej Koscuisko, a ship's surgeon and state torturer, and are primarily concerned with his reactions to the violence he is called on to commit in the name of the state. The Under Jurisdiction series continued in 2017 with Blood Enemies and 2019 with Crimes Against Humanity.

== Publications ==
Under Jurisdiction series

1. An Exchange of Hostages (1997), ISBN 0-380-78913-2 (number 1 in series chronology)
2. Prisoner of Conscience (1998), ISBN 0-380-78914-0 (number 2 in series chronology)
3. Hour of Judgment (1999), ISBN 0-380-80314-3 (number 4 in series chronology)
4. Angel of Destruction (2001), ISBN 0-451-45849-4 (number 3 in series chronology)
5. The Devil and Deep Space (2002), ISBN 0-451-45901-6 (number 5 in series chronology)
6. Warring States (2006), ISBN 1-59222-094-0 (number 6 in series chronology)
7. Blood Enemies (2017), ISBN 978-1-4767-8216-4 (number 7 in series chronology)
8. Crimes Against Humanity (2019), ISBN 978-1-4814-8371-1

Under Jurisdiction Baen Omnibus series

1. Fleet Inquisitor (2016), ISBN 978-1-4767-8194-5
  1. An Exchange of Hostages (number 1 in series chronology)
  2. Prisoner of Conscience (number 2 in series chronology)
  3. Angel of Destruction (number 3 in series chronology)
2. Fleet Renegade (2017), ISBN 978-1-4767-8209-6
  4. Hour of Judgment (number 4 in series chronology)
  5. The Devil and Deep Space (number 5 in series chronology)
  6. Warring States (number 6 in series chronology)
3. Fleet Insurgent (2017), ISBN 978-1-4814-8286-8 (collection of novellas, novelettes, and short stories)

The High Pamir series (as Zarabeth Abbey)

1. The Wild High Places (2020), ISBN 978-1-9512-9316-1
2. The Ley Lines of Kashgar (2021)

Other novels

- Avalanche Soldier (1999), ISBN 0-380-80315-1
- Colony Fleet (2000), ISBN 0-380-80316-X

== Recurring Judiciary characters ==
- Andrej Koscuisko: He is a ship's surgeon and Inquisitor licensed to use torture, which is very troubling for him. He is the oldest son of wealthy Prince Alexie Ilmyanitch and will eventually inherit the Koscuisko family corporation, the Dolgorukij Combine. He is from the Anzary homeworld. He is blond and muscular.
- Mergau Noycannir: an ambitious Clerk of Court and a member of First Secretary Verlaine’s personal staff. She was a fellow student with Andrej Koscuisko in the Jurisdiction training program.
- Garol Vogel: A Bench Intelligence Specialist, he is one of the few empowered to uphold the rule of Law by any means, including assassination. He only has to answer to a Judge Presiding.
- Jils Ivers: A Bench Intelligence Specialist for Chilleau Judiciary.
- Captain Griers Verigson Lowden: The corrupt Captain of the experimental spaceship Ragnarok, who is known for his sadistic behavior.
