= Guy Snyder (writer) =

American science fiction writer

Guy Eugene Snyder Jr. (born May 3, 1951, in Columbus, Ohio) is an American science fiction writer.

In 1974, he was a finalist for the second ever John W. Campbell Award for Best New Writer, for his 1973 novel Testament XXI.

In 1979, Orson Scott Card wrote in Science Fiction Review that "Lady of Ice" by Guy Snyder was a "pure science fiction adventure story".
