= K. J. Bishop =

Australian writer and artist

- Born: Kirsten J. Bishop Melbourne, Australia
- Occupation: Novelist, artist
- Genre: Fantasy, science fiction

Kirsten Jane Bishop is an Australian writer and artist. In 2004, her first book, The Etched City, was nominated for a World Fantasy Award for Best Novel. She is a recipient of the Aurealis Award for best collection.

== Bibliography ==
=== Novels ===
- The Etched City (2003)

=== Collections ===
- That Book Your Mad Ancestor Wrote (e-book publication in 2012)

=== Short fiction ===
- "The Art of Dying" (1997)
- "The Love of Beauty" (1999)
- "The Memorial Page" (2002)
- "On the Origins of the Fragrant Hill" (2002)
- "Beach Rubble" (2003)
- "Maldoror Abroad" (2003)
- "Reminiscence" (The Thackery T Lambshead Pocket Guide to Eccentric & Discredited Diseases, 2003)
- "Alsiso" (The Alsiso Project, 2004)
- "We the Enclosed" (2004)
- "Vision Splendid", in Baggage (published by Eneit Press run by Sharyn Lilley)(2010)

== Awards ==
- 2004 William L. Crawford Award for Best First Novel
- 2004 Ditmar Award for Best Novel
- 2004 Ditmar Award for Best New Talent
