= The Unspoken Name =

2020 fantasy novel by A.K. Larkwood

- Official cover art for The Unspoken Name
- Author: A.K. Larkwood
- Language: English
- Series: The Serpent Gates
- Release number: 1
- Genre: Fantasy, Science fiction
- Published: 11 Feb 2020
- Publisher: Tor Books
- Pages: 464 (hardcover)
- ISBN: 1250238900
- Website: https://aklarkwood.com/unspoken

The Unspoken Name is a 2020 fantasy novel, the debut novel by A.K. Larkwood. Csorwe, an Oshaaru, is pledged to be sacrificed to the Unspoken God before she is rescued by the wizard Sethennai. She becomes his assassin and spy, dedicating her life to the search for a missing artifact. An unexpected encounter with a young mage calls Csorwe's loyalties into question. The Unspoken Name is the first in the planned Serpent Gates series.

== Plot ==
Thirteen-year-old Csorwe is an Oshaaru living in a temple called the House of Silence, where she is pledged to be the Chosen Bride of the Unspoken God. On her fourteenth birthday, she is destined to be sacrificed to the god. On the day of the ritual, a traveling Tlaanthothe wizard named Belthandros Sethennai convinces her to abandon her vows and become his apprentice. Oranna, a necromancer from the House of Silence, becomes jealous that Sethennai did not rescue her from the temple and vows revenge.

Csorwe trains under Sethennai, gaining skills as a spy and assassin. She helps him to regain his position as the Chancellor of the city of Tlaanthothe. Sethennai takes the nephew of the previous Chancellor, Tal Charossa, as another pupil. Tal and Csorwe despise one another, and their mutual hatred drives many of their actions. They both pledge to help Sethennai recover the Reliquary of Pentravasse.

In their search for the Reliquary, Csorwe meets young mage Adept Shuthmili. Shuthmili has been exploring the ruined monument that holds the Reliquary. Oranna arrives and seizes the Reliquary; Csorwe chooses to save Shuthmili rather than pursue Oranna. Shuthmili is destined to become part of a hive mind of mages designed to protect the Qarzashi Empire; Csorwe convinces her to abandon this duty and escape with her.

Csorwe retrieves the Reliquary from Oranna, who is then imprisoned by Sethennai. In the struggle, Shuthmili is captured and returned to the Empire. Csorwe frees Oranna, and they work together to rescue Shuthmili. Csorwe and Shuthmili begin a romantic relationship. A series of rescue attempts ends when Shuthmili kills an Empire Inquisitor and is arrested for treason. Shuthmili and Tal steal the Reliquary from Sethennai. Csorwe rescues Shuthmili from the Empire for a final time. She learns that the Reliquary holds Sethennai's heart, granting him immortality. She and Tal both abandon Sethennai, feeling that they have been used. Csorwe and Shuthmili trade the Reliquary to Sethennai in exchange for escape on an Empire ship.

== Background ==
Larkwood calls The Tombs of Atuan by Ursula K. Le Guin her favorite novel. In this novel, a young woman escapes from the cult of a strange god with the help of a kind and considerate wizard. Her character of Belthandros Sethennai was inspired by imagining a wizard who was the opposite in terms of personality.

Larkwood began the novel by developing her magic system, believing that tying it to religion made it feel less artificial. She was inspired by Throne of the Crescent Moon by Saladin Ahmed with regards to magic and divine power. Larkwood had previously worked on stories in a "vaguely Medieval European" setting and was concerned with anachronism. She rejected this idea for The Unspoken Name, preferring instead to focus on the characters and plot rather than "a defined 'tech level' and a little snowglobe of geopolitics". This philosophy also contributed to the lack of homophobia in the novel.

== Reception ==
The work received moderately positive reviews from critics. Publishers Weekly gave the novel a starred review, praising the "lyrical, immersive prose" and complex worldbuilding. Kirkus Reviews called the book "imaginative but never fully convincing", praising the "crisp, vivid prose" but decrying the meandering plot.

Writing for Tor.com, Linda H. Codega praised the author's queer representation, as well as the "sharply polished" and "multifaceted" characters.
