= The Raven Scholar =

2025 novel by Antonia Hodgson

- Author: Antonia Hodgson
- Audio read by: Daphne Kouma
- Language: English
- Series: Eternal Path Trilogy
- Genre: Fantasy
- Published: April 17, 2025
- Publisher: Orbit
- Publication place: United Kingdom
- Pages: 673
- ISBN: 978-1529339901
- Followed by: The Fox in Winter

The Raven Scholar is a 2025 fantasy novel by Antonia Hodgson. It is the first book of the planned Eternal Path trilogy. The novel was a finalist the 2026 Hugo Award for Best Novel and Compton Crook Award. A sequel, The Fox in Winter, has been announced for release on 5 October 2027.

== Plot and setting ==
Neema Kraa is a scholarly young woman of humble background, who chose the path of the Raven, one of eight caste-like groups in the empire of Orrun. Her on-and-off best friend is Cain Ballari, a Fox of even lower beginnings.

The eight paths are customarily named and numbered in the order Fox, Raven, Tiger, Ox, Bear, Monkey, Hound, and Dragon, collectively known as the Eight. Most people join one of the eight monasteries for training, either by their own choice or by a monastery's selection. Belief in the Eight ranges from cultural mythology to devout dedication and even claims of encounters with their patrons.

Years earlier, Emperor Bersun, a Bear, had alienated the aristocracy with reforms that ordered all eight parts to be open to people of any social class. The Tiger Andren Valit tried to overthrow Bersun, who barely survived. Andren was condemned, but his family were judge uninvolved, and merely banished from the capitol. But later, Bersun summons Andren's surviving family, including twin children Yanara and Ruko, back to the capitol.

In spite of general recognition of her brilliance, Neema is repeatedly denied professional advancement, due to her commoner background. But a conflict between Yana and Ruko results in exile for Yana, and Bersun commands Neema to scribe the order of exile. Her agreement results in her elevation to a high scholarly position in Bersun's court.

When the expiration of Bersun's 24 year term as emperor approaches, the replacement ceremony is scheduled. The monasteries, except for Dragon, send contenders to compete to be the next emperor, through fights and tests of skills designed by the monasteries.

The favored contender is the Tiger Ruko. The Fox Cain is regarded as a longshot. The competition is thrown into disarray by the murder of the Raven contender Gaida, apparently by means of a cursed blade. The murder is a huge surprise, both because she is widely popular and because murder of a contender is such a serious crime. Neema is ordered to investigate the murder, an uncomfortable task because of their professional rivalry. Neema also becomes the emergency replacement as Raven contender, with the cooperation of the Hound Sergeant Worthy, who has the limited mind-reading talent of Houndsight.

Neema quickly unravels some aspects of the murder. The stabbing with the cursed blade took place only after Gaida was dead of poison. And Bersun may have died in the usurpation fight, secretly replaced by his younger brother Gedrun.

All of the contenders hope Ruko is defeated; he's viewed as dangerous and untrustworthy. But as the strongest contender, he holds the lead. After seven rounds of competition, he and Cain are tied, and surprisingly Neema is a close third. They advance to the dreaded tiebreaker, the Dragon trial, which is rarely needed, and feared because many fail to survive, many end up mad, and all are changed.

== Publication ==
The Raven Scholar was first published by Orbit Books in April 2025. An audiobook was released by Hachette Audio that same month, narrated by Daphne Kouma.

== Reception and awards ==
Chris Kluwe at Lightspeed Magazine called The Raven Scholar "a fascinating book on multiple levels, the first of which was Hodgson’s command of description and tone. The writing in this book is like sinking into a dream world, drawn in evocative phrases that never overstay their welcome." Kirkus Reviews called the book "a richly imagined novel" full of "lush world-building".

Publishers Weekly gave the novel a starred review, noting: "Hodgson’s attention to detail makes the worldbuilding vivid; and her subtle, playful prose enriches the ingeniously constructed narrative. This impressive display of versatility marks Hodgson as an exciting new voice in fantasy."

Molly Templeton at Reactor described it as, "Propulsive, compelling, engrossing, cleverly plotted, devastating, and also, yes, quite fun." She noted "Hogdson weaves her fantastical history tightly; there’s hardly a wall or a walkway on the emperor’s nameless island that Yara doesn’t recognize for its role in the creation of this land and this world. The density is rich but never overwhelming, beautifully sketched but not overly detailed."

Year	Award	Category	Result	Ref.
2026	Compton Crook Award	—	Finalist	
2026	Hugo Award	Novel	Finalist	
