= Warren Norwood =

American novelist

Warren Carl Norwood
- Born: August 21, 1945
- Died: June 3, 2005 (aged 59); Weatherford, Texas, U.S.
- Occupations: Science fiction writer; soldier; teacher
- Spouse: Gigi Sherrell Norwood
- Writing career
- Genre: Science fiction
- Military career
- Allegiance: United States of America
- Branch: United States Army
- Conflicts: Vietnam War
- Awards: Purple Heart; Bronze Star; Army Commendation Medal

Warren Carl Norwood (August 21, 1945 – June 3, 2005) was an American science-fiction novelist, teacher, and musician. Norwood was a member of Science Fiction and Fantasy Writers of America and was the author of 14 science-fiction novels, most of them written during the 1980s. When not writing, he was a longtime employee of Craig's Music in Weatherford, Texas. Norwood also taught writing at Weatherford College and Tarrant County College.

== Military service and citations ==
A veteran of the Vietnam War, Warren received the Purple Heart, Bronze Star, and Army Commendation Medal.

== Legacy ==
Upon his death, his manuscripts and papers, consisting of 53 boxes of material, were transferred to the University of North Texas Special Collections department in Denton.

== Death ==
Norwood died of liver disease and kidney failure in Weatherford, Texas, on Friday, June 3, 2005, at the age of 59. He was survived by his wife, Gigi Sherrell Norwood.

== Bibliography ==
- 1982 An Image of Voices
- 1983 Fize of the Gabriel Ratchets
- 1983 Flexing the Warp
- 1983 The Seren Cenacles (with Ralph Mylius)
- 1984 Midway Between
- 1984 Planet of Flowers
- 1985 Polar Fleet
- 1986 Final Command
- 1987 Shudderchild
- 1988 Trapped
- 1988 True Jaguar
- 1988 Vanished
- 1989 Stranded
- 1989 Refugee (unpublished; an unedited draft of this novel is at University of North Texas in Special Collections)

== Series ==
=== The Double-Spiral War ===
- Midway Between
- Polar Fleet
- Final Command

=== Time Police ===
- Vanished
- Trapped
- Stranded
- Refugee

=== The Windhover Tapes ===
- An Image of Voices
- Flexing the Warp
- Fize of the Gabriel Ratchets
- Planet of Flowers
