= Daniel Marcus =

American novelist

- Education: Clarion West Writers Workshop; University of California, Berkeley (PhD)
- Occupation: Author
- Writing career
- Genre: Science fiction

Daniel Marcus is an American science fiction author from Berkeley, California. He has written numerous short stories that have appeared in Witness, Asimov's Science Fiction, Realms of Fantasy, The Magazine of Fantasy & Science Fiction, and other publications. Binding Energy, a collection of his short stories, was published in 2008 to positive reviews. He has authored two novels and is currently an instructor at Gotham Writers Workshop. Daniel Marcus is a graduate of Clarion West Writers Workshop and holds a Ph.D. in mechanical engineering from UC Berkeley.
