= Long Shot for Rosinante =

1981 novel by Alexis Gilliland

Long Shot for Rosinante is a novel by Alexis Gilliland published in 1981.

== Plot summary ==
Long Shot for Rosinante is a novel in which the colony Rosinante declares independence from the state of Texas.

== Reception ==
Greg Costikyan reviewed Long Shot for Rosinante in Ares Magazine #12 and commented that "For a novel which centers around political conflict [...] Long Shot seems sparse in its attempt to investigate political problems. Long Shot is a readable book, but does little more than recapitulate most of the themes stated in Rosinante."

== Reviews ==
- Review by Tom Easton (1982) in Analog Science Fiction/Science Fact, July 1982
