= Holly Lisle =

American writer (1960–2024)

Holly Lisle (October 8, 1960 – August 27, 2024) was an American writer of fantasy, science fiction, paranormal romance and romantic suspense novels. She was also known for her work in educating writers, including her e-book Mugging the Muse: Writing Fiction for Love And Money, starting the Forward Motion Writers' Community web site, and her novel-writing and revision courses How to Think Sideways.

== Bibliography ==
Unless otherwise noted, books on this list are fantasy.

=== Series ===
==== Arhel ====
- 1992 Fire in the Mist (Compton Crook Award winner)
- 1993 Bones of the Past
- 1995 Mind of the Magic

==== Glenraven ====
Co-authored with Marion Zimmer Bradley

- 1996 Glenraven
- 1998 In the Rift – Glenraven II

==== Devil's Point ====
- 1996 Sympathy for the Devil
- 1996 The Devil and Dan Cooley (with Walter Spence)
- 1997 Hell on High (with Ted Nolan)

==== Bard's Tale ====
- 1996 Thunder of the Captains (with Aaron Allston)
- 1997 Wrath of the Princes (with Aaron Allston)
- 1998 Curse of the Black Heron

==== The Secret Texts ====
- 2002 Vincalis the Agitator (a prequel to the other three books which form a trilogy)
- 1998 Diplomacy of Wolves
- 1999 Vengeance of Dragons
- 2000 Courage of Falcons

==== World Gates ====
- 2002 Memory of Fire
- 2003 The Wreck of Heaven
- 2004 Gods Old and Dark

==== Korre ====
- 2005 Talyn
- 2008 Hawkspar
- Yet to be Published: Redbird

==== Moon and Sun ====
- 2008 The Ruby Key, new edition (including eBook) 2026
- 2009 The Silver Door, new edition (including eBook) 2026
- coming soon The Emerald Sun and The Golden Horse by her student Katharina Gerlach

Cadence Drake (Science Fiction)

- 1997 Hunting the Corrigan's Blood
- 2012 Warpaint

Tales from the Longview (set in the same universe as the Cadence Drake series) (Science Fiction)

- 2017 Born From Fire (originally published as "Enter The Death Circus" in 2014)
- 2017 The Selling of Suzee Delight
- 2017 The Philosopher Gambit
- 2017 Gunslinger Moon
- 2018 Vipers’ Nest
- 2018 The Owner's Tale

Short Fiction

- Armor-ella
- Bad Bottle

=== Other fiction ===
- 1992 When the Bough Breaks (with Mercedes Lackey, set in the SERRAted Edge series)
- 1993 Minerva Wakes
- 1994 The Rose Sea (with S.M. Stirling)
- 1995 Mall, Mayhem and Magic (with Chris Guin)
- 2004 Midnight Rain (paranormal romantic suspense)
- 2005 Last Girl Dancing (paranormal romantic suspense)
- 2006 I See You (paranormal romantic suspense)
- 2007 Night Echoes (paranormal romantic suspense)

=== Books for writers (non-fiction) ===
- 2000 Mugging the Muse: Writing Fiction for Love and Money (non-fiction) (e-book)
- 2006 Create a Character Clinic (non-fiction) (e-book, available via the author's web shop)
- 2006 Create a Language Clinic (non-fiction) (e-book)
- 2006 Create a Culture Clinic (non-fiction) (e-book)
- 2007 Create a Plot Clinic (non-fiction) (e-book)
- 2008 How to write page-turning scenes (non-fiction) (e-book)
- 2014: Create a World Clinic (non-fiction) (e-book)
