= Vina Jie-Min Prasad =

Singaporean writer

- Born: Singapore
- Occupation: Author
- Writing career
- Genres: Science fiction, fantasy
- Website: vinaprasad.com

Vina Jie-Min Prasad (维娜·杰敏·普拉萨德) is a Singaporean writer of science fiction and fantasy. She is a three-time finalist for both the Nebula Award and the Hugo Award, and has also been a finalist for other speculative fiction awards.

== Writing career ==
Prasad has been active in speculative fiction since 2016. She is a graduate of the Clarion West Writers Workshop.

== Recognition ==
Prasad's short stories "Fandom for Robots" and "A Series of Steaks", both published in 2017, were nominated for the Nebula Award, the Hugo Award and the Theodore Sturgeon Award. Her short story "A Guide for Working Breeds" was a finalist for the Nebula Award for Best Short Story of 2020, and for the 2021 Hugo Award for Best Short Story.

She was a finalist for the 2018 John W. Campbell Award for Best New Writer, and came second.

== Bibliography ==
=== Short fiction ===
- "Different Ways to Burn" (HEAT: A Southeast Asian Urban Anthology, Apr. 2016)
- "The Spy Who Loved Wanton Mee" (Queer Southeast Asia: A Literary Journal of Transgressive Art, Oct. 2016)
- "A Series of Steaks" (Clarkesworld 124, Jan. 2017)
- "Fandom for Robots" (Uncanny Magazine 18, Sep./Oct. 2017)
- "Portrait of Skull with Man" (Fireside Fiction 49, Nov. 2017)
- "Pistol Grip" (Uncanny Magazine 21, Mar./Apr. 2018)
- "Black Flowers Blossom" (Uncanny Magazine 31, Nov./Dec. 2019)
- "A Guide for Working Breeds" (Made To Order: Robots and Revolution, Mar. 2020)

=== Interviews ===
- "Interview: Vina Jie-Min Prasad" (Uncanny Magazine 21, Mar./Apr. 2018) (Caroline M. Yoachim)
