= Winter's Orbit =

2021 space opera novel by Everina Maxwell

- Cover art for the American first edition of the novel
- Author: Everina Maxwell
- Language: English
- Genre: Space opera; science fiction
- Publisher: Tor Books (US); Orbit Books (UK)
- Publication date: 2 Feb 2021
- Publication place: United Kingdom
- Pages: 430 (Hardback)
- ISBN: 9781250758835

Winter's Orbit is a 2021 LGBT space opera novel, the debut novel by Everina Maxwell. After Prince Taam of Iskat dies mysteriously, his cousin Kiem is forced to marry Taam's widower. The fate of their solar system may hinge on their marriage.

== Plot ==
Iskat is the leader of an empire comprising seven planets. Each solar system must sign a Resolution treaty and be approved by Auditors in order to secure the right to communicate with the wider galaxy. Without a valid Resolution treaty, the Iskat Empire would be immediately conquered by stronger civilizations.

Prince Taam of Iskat is married to Count Jainan of Thea, a planet under Iskat's rule. Taam works on a secret government mining project, operation Kingfisher. He is killed in a flight accident. The Emperor orders Prince Kiem to marry Jainan. Kiem is the Emperor's least favorite grandchild, as well as Taam's cousin.

After an awkward wedding, Kiem and Jainan are interviewed by the Auditor. The Auditor refuses to confirm the pair as Resolution treaty representatives, claiming that Taam was murdered. Kiem and Jainan are uncomfortable around each other, each allowing his own misconceptions and self-doubt to prevent them from making any real connection. Jainan finds documentation that Taam's final flight log was doctored, and the pair learns that Jainan is being investigated for the murder. They initially suspect Professor Audel, a former military scientist now working at the University. With help from Aren Saffer, a military officer and Taam's friend, they find evidence that Taam was embezzling military funds. They are ordered to stop investigating and fly back to the Imperial Palace to be interviewed, but their flybug crashes. In the trek back to civilization, Kiem and Jainan begin a true romantic relationship.

Kiem finds that the Iskat military was blackmailing Taam with a video of Taam hitting Jainan. Jainan is arrested by the military and is taken to the Kingfisher refinery, where Saffer tortures him. Saffer and the military have used the embezzled money to illegally purchase a weapons cache, and are planning to conquer Iskat's subordinate planets, break from the Resolution treaty, and seize power from the Emperor. Saffer confirms that he killed Taam to cover up his own embezzlement, and hopes to implant false memories into Jainan and convince him to take the fall. Kiem and his allies break into Kingfisher and rescue Jainan, though he and Saffer are both arrested and Jainan is hospitalized. Jainan gives an interview revealing Taam's abuse, resulting in a groundswell of support for renewing the Resolution treaty and renewed bargaining power for Thea. As a result, the Emperor reluctantly agrees to new terms proposed by Jainan and Kiem - the Empire is to be converted into an equal partnership between all seven planets.

As the dust settles, Jainan and Kiem declare their love for one another and look forward to a future together. Jainan is offered the position of taking the lead on operation Kingfisher, and Kiem as a diplomatic liaison to Thea.

== Major themes ==
Gender and gender expression play a unique role in Iskat society. Characters from Iskat show their gender to others by wearing ornaments made of flint (for female), wood (for male), or glass (for non-binary). This explores the idea that gender is performance rather than an innate characteristic. Additionally, because the Iskat Empire imposes its views of gender performance onto its subject planets, the characters' gender performance is used to explore imperialism.

== Publication history ==
The work was originally published in 2017 under the title Course of Honor on the fan website Archive of Our Own. Course of Honor was not fan fiction, but adhered to certain genre conventions which remain present in Winter's Orbit. The novel was later acquired by Tor Books and further developed before being traditionally published.

== Reception ==
The novel received positive critical reviews. Author Amal El-Mohtar, writing for The New York Times, praised the development of Jainan's and Kiem's relationship, calling it "a powerfully simple pleasure". Writing for Locus, reviewer Liz Bourke praised the novel, calling it "a promising debut... well-paced and deftly written". The novel also received praise for its positive portrayal of queer romance and its exploration of gender roles. Publishers Weekly gave the novel a positive review, comparing it to the works of Lois McMaster Bujold. The review wrote that Maxwell "elegantly combines clan politics, galactic power struggles, and marriage dynamics" despite a "soapy conclusion". A reviewer for NPR found the romance to be promising, while feeling that the space opera elements of the story were underdeveloped.
