= Seafort Saga =

Series of science fiction novels by David Feintuch

The Seafort Saga
- Novels: Midshipman's Hope (1994); Challenger's Hope (1995); Prisoner's Hope (1995); Fisherman's Hope (1996); Voices of Hope (1996); Patriarch's Hope (1999); Children of Hope (2001); Galahad's Hope (unpublished)
- Author: David Feintuch
- Country: United States
- Language: English
- Genre: science fiction
- Publisher: various
- Published: 1994-2001
- No. of books: 7 published, 1 not

The Seafort Saga is a series of science fiction novels written by American author David Feintuch. The novels are set from the late 22nd century to the mid-23rd century and relate the adventures of Nicholas Seafort, an officer in the (fictional) UNNS| United Nations Naval Service. The series is a collection of personal accounts, usually from the perspective of Nicholas Seafort, describing Seafort's adventures, beginning as a lowly midshipman, to the elected leader of earth, and finally to the captain of the UNNS flagship Olympiad. Although most books in the series are told from a single perspective, usually Seafort's, Voices of Hope is a collection of accounts from several sources: Seafort's son, PT, the son of a friend of Seafort's, and a transient boy named Pook. Additionally, Children of Hope is narrated by Randy Carr, the son of a close friend of Seafort.

== Reception ==
The main character has been described as an anti-hero.

Gwyneth Jones criticized the series as "repetitive and formulaic", with "some of the least scientific science fiction, and the least convincing alien monsters (giant spacefaring goldfish), of modern times", noting that nonetheless the series "rolls on, from one dreadful humiliation to the next, with occasional bursts of brilliant action, to the guilty satisfaction of many readers".

== Characters ==
- Nicholas Seafort
- Vax Holser
- Alexi Tamarov
- Derek Anthony Carr
- Edgar Tolliver
- Philip Tyre "PT" Seafort
- Robert Boland
- Randolph "Randy" Carr

== Midshipman's Hope ==
Midshipman's Hope was published in 1994 as the first book in the saga. It depicts the first voyage of UNNS officer Nicholas Seafort.

=== Plot ===
Nicholas Seafort is a seventeen-year-old midshipman who boards the UNS Hibernia on his first space assignment, a three-year interstellar voyage to the colonies of Hope Nation and Detour. He beats back a challenge to his authority as senior midshipman by Vax Holser, the next most senior. During the trip, he strikes up friendships with Third Lieutenant Harv Malstrom and an attractive passenger, Amanda Frowel.

A disastrous rescue of a passenger injured while sightseeing on the wreck of another ship results in the deaths of Captain Haag and his two senior lieutenants, elevating Malstrom to the captaincy and Seafort to second-in-command of Hibernia. When Maelstrom falls ill with a quick-acting cancer, Seafort, believing himself to be unqualified to command, begs him to promote Holser to lieutenant, but Maelstrom dies without doing so.

The other surviving officers (outside the chain of command) share Seafort's opinion of his leadership abilities and try to get him to relieve himself, but he cannot find any regulations that permit it. They back down when Seafort points out the penalty for mutiny.

Seafort is immediately faced with a difficult decision. Malstrom had condemned three crewmen to death for assaulting the sergeant-at-arms in an attempt to conceal their drug-making operation. Their punishment was extremely unpopular with the rest of the crew. However, despite the danger of a revolt, Seafort has two of the men hanged; the third's sentence is commuted to several months' confinement. His resolute handling of the situation quells the unruly crewmen. This action estranges him from Amanda, who feels the executions to be barbaric.

Other dangers follow. By thoroughness and sheer stubbornness, Seafort discovers that the ship's sentient computer, Darla, has been corrupted by careless naval programmers and would have sent the ship hopelessly off-course on the next leg of their journey. Darla was also responsible for the explosion that killed Captain Haag. To fix the problem, Seafort has a backup restored.

When the ship arrives at its next stop, Miningcamp, a small mining colony in an otherwise uninhabitable system, mutineers from the space station try to take over the ship. Seafort single-handedly holds them off until the crew can regroup and deal with the intruders. Eventually, Seafort ends the rebellion and finds out the cause. An ore barge and the starship Telstar are long overdue, which resulted in the panic that led to the trouble.

When the Hibernia reaches Hope Nation, Seafort expects to be relieved, but discovers that not only has the admiral in command of the naval garrison died in a strange viral epidemic, but a captain has deserted, leaving a Hope Nation commanding officer who is junior to Seafort. Seafort finds himself in charge of all naval forces in the system. During a tour of the planet, Seafort, Amanda (with whom he has reconciled) and one of his officers run into the captain who had deserted. He is hiding in the mountains with his wife because he believes he saw meteors spraying something in the sky shortly before the epidemic broke out. Believing the man to be mad, Seafort dismisses his story as fantasy, but does not force the couple to return to civilization.

Seafort recruits several officers from the local personnel, then continues on to the next stop, Detour. He finds that two of the new men are poor officers, dumped on him by their former commanders. However, he manages to deal with the situation.

Then Hibernia's sensors detect Telstar, adrift in space with massive rents in her hull. Seafort leads a boarding party to investigate and, to his horror, encounters a strange alien life form resembling an amoeba in the ship's corridor. When it attacks, it becomes clear that it was responsible for the disabling of Telstar and the death of its crew. Fortunately, Seafort is able to escape unharmed. After a stop at Hope Nation to warn the residents, Seafort takes Hibernia back to Earth to report the news.

=== Feature film ===
In 2015, Clover Red LLC obtained the rights for the film adaptation of Midshipman's Hope. In May 2015 Clover Red LLC started a crowdfunding campaign on the Kickstarter platform to fund development of the screenplay; the crowdfund fell short of the funding goal on June 12, 2015.

== Challenger's Hope ==
Challenger's Hope was published in 1995 as the second book in the saga.

=== Plot ===
Nicholas Seafort, newly assigned commander of UNS Challenger and part of Admiral Geoffrey Tremaine's task force, has his ship taken from him when Tremaine decides to make Challenger his flagship, under the command of Captain Hasselbrad. Seafort is given command of the admiral's far smaller original flagship, UNS Portia. Tremaine's task force has the task of reaching Hope Nation and eliminating any of the hostile aliens (nicknamed "Fish") if found on the way.

Portia is given the task of transporting a group of Lower New York 'transpops'—uneducated and often violent street children—to the colony of Detour beyond Hope Nation. Seafort initially sees the transpops as simply a danger to his ship (drugging or imprisoning them were considered as solutions). The squadron is attacked by Fish that board Portia, releasing their lethal virus into the ship and killing dozens of her crew and passengers, including Seafort's baby son. Amanda Seafort, driven insane by grief, commits suicide, and Nicholas suffers a temporary breakdown as a result.

After his recovery, Portia encounters Challenger, crippled by a Fish attack. Seafort is transferred to the ship and is left alone, save for passengers and crew that Tremaine hates, including the transpops, and abandoned in space. After overcoming a mutiny, Seafort sets about preparing Challenger for an eighty-year voyage back to Earth, conscripting passengers into the Naval Service and scavenging from the wrecked sections of the ship. Barely weeks into the trip, radiation from the ship's damaged propulsion systems attracts the aliens, leading to a series of desperate battles in which Challenger is further damaged, and more of her already tiny crew killed. Ultimately, Seafort uses his dying ship to ram an alien, only for it to Fuse (accelerate to faster-than-light speed), taking Challenger with it. For sixty days, Challenger remains lodged in the alien, her crew dying of malnutrition until, almost miraculously, the dying Fish Defuses in Earth's solar system.

In the aftermath of the voyage, Seafort meets his father at a naval base on the moon, and is given command of his old ship, Hibernia, to return to Hope Nation.

== Prisoner's Hope ==
Prisoner's Hope was published in 1995 as the third book in the saga.

=== Plot ===
Captain Nicholas Seafort is planetside on Hope Nation while recuperating from injuries, some of which were sustained from a duel with Admiral Tremaine. The injuries include a lung which must be replaced, as well as psychological trauma accumulated due to the many traumatic experiences he has been through. Among the injuries Seafort has sustained is the ruined friendship with his former shipmate, Vax Holser. Vax resents Seafort sending him away from Challenger, wanting to remain with his captain no matter what.

The admiral in charge of the United Nations fleet in the sector makes a bargain with Seafort: due to his supposed good relations with some of the planters, he can meet with and report on what their grievances are and attempt to allay them. This appointment does not sit well with him, as he would much prefer to be assigned a captaincy. However, the UN space fleet retreats Earthward after tangling with the space threat discovered by Seafort in his first voyage on Hibernia. This leaves Seafort the sole United Nations authority on the planet, which makes him a target.

Some of the planters, disaffected by the long history of unfulfilled promises and seeking greater autonomy in their future, mount a rebellion. The initial casualties include Alexi Tamarov, who is injured in an explosion meant to kill Seafort, but which instead leaves him in a coma. Coming out of the coma, Alexi has suffered amnesia, not knowing his old friend or anything about his naval responsibilities. Additionally, Seafort marries the former transient Annie Wells, but is left feeling betrayed when she has what she considers a meaningless sexual encounter with an old friend.

Seafort must avert the rebellion while dealing with his wounds, both mental and physical, and lead the colonists against the space invaders, who have begun to attack not just the fleets in orbit but also the planet. To do so, he must turn his back on his oath to the UN Navy and commit high treason.

Reaching the station in orbit above Hope Nation, Seafort manages to transmit skewed N-Waves which attract the "fish", and uses the automated weapons on board the station to kill thousands of them. He also arranges for the stations fusion reactor to detonate, which is tantamount to a nuclear explosion. Such an act is punishable by death, but Seafort no longer cares about his life. In the process of conducting this exercise, Vax Holser arrives at the last minute with a ship and arranges to come aboard the station. While there, he incapacitates Seafort, and sends him back on his launch, remaining in his place. This results in Vax's death.

Seafort must assume command of Vax's old ship, with a crew who do not trust him (blaming him for their captain's death), passengers who do not like him (including Annie, who has been driven insane after an attempted rape by criminals on Hope Nation; Alexi with his amnesia; and Jarence Branstead, who is a potential goofjuice addict) as well as wrestling with his own sense of justice, which he feels demands his death for his failures.

Reaching Earth, Seafort finds that the ban on nuclear weapons has been lifted due to repeated attacks by the Fish, and his actions are deemed laudable by the navy. Feeling unworthy, Seafort seeks to resign. Instead, he is persuaded to take over the command of the naval academy, training the next generation of cadets.

== Fisherman's Hope ==
Fisherman's Hope was published in 1996 as the fourth book in the saga.

=== Plot ===
Captain Seafort has been made commandant of the naval academy, a promotion which does not sit well with him. Having no tolerance for the political machinations which he must deal with, he struggles to accomplish anything he feels is worthwhile.

Additionally his wife, Annie Wells, is still suffering mental trauma from her rape while on Hope Nation. While receiving treatment, she runs away from her clinic and takes to the streets of Old New York City. Captain Seafort must turn to an old acquaintance, Eddie Boss, in an effort to try and find her. In the process, he must also risk his own life while braving the transient-controlled streets.

Back at the academy, Seafort is helpless to do anything when the Fish attack the home system. He comes up with a desperate plan which may save the home system, but would also mean his certain death, as well as the deaths of cadets who have placed their trust in him.

Somehow surviving the attack, but now firmly scarred mentally and emotionally from what the survival of home system has cost him, Seafort finally resigns his commission.

In an epilogue, it is revealed that Captain Seafort finds comfort in the seclusion of a monastery. As part of his penance and treatment, the head of the monastery encourages him to write down his life story to try to help purge him of his feelings of guilt.

After several years of seclusion, he is persuaded to enter politics, using his support to help strengthen the navy to the best of his ability. He divorces Annie and marries an old academy classmate, Arlene Sanders. His unswerving devotion to honesty in all things leads to his government being voted out of office, but allows him to preserve his integrity and his honor.

== Voices of Hope ==
Voices of Hope was published in 1997 as the fifth book in the saga. The style of this book differs from the previous ones as it encompasses not merely Captain Seafort's perspective on the events contained within, but also certain other characters.

=== Plot ===
Years after retiring from politics, Captain Seafort lives in a private compound with his wife Arlene, his son Philip Tyre, his aide Adam Tenere, and Adam's son Jared. Adam's wife died when Jared was very young, and her loss has caused Adam to be very lax with disciplining his child. As a result Jared has grown up to be a rebellious teenager with a lack of respect for authority.

In contrast, Nick and Arlene have raised their son to military standards of hygiene, morality, and behavior, although not encouraging him to follow them into the Navy.

Philip has grown into a very intelligent adolescent, with deep respect for his parents and what they expect of him. This contrasts with Jared who spends his days resenting his father, resenting captain Seafort, and finding pride in his computer hacking abilities and idolizing those cause internet mischief.

Captain Seafort regularly makes return visits to the monastery where he found necessary seclusion which enabled him to restore his soul. During the course of preparing for one of these excursions, Captain Seafort discovers Jared spying on a private conversation that a visitor is having, in the hopes of selling the information to a newspaper. The visitor in question is former Cadet Boland, now Assemblyman Boland.

The conversation that was overheard was between the Assemblyman and his father, about how they could potentially discredit Captain Seafort's reputation. Neither of them enjoy the prospect, but they feel it may become a political necessity.

With both his father, captain seafort, and Philip (referred to as PT) mad at him, Jared hacks his father's Bank accounts, steals money, and sneaks off to New York in the hopes of selling what information he has on the attempts of the Bolands to discredit Captain Seafort. He hopes he can use the story to make enough money, to live his own life where he can do what he pleases.

Well this is going on, senator Boland is making plans to continue revamping New York city. In the process, the demolition and construction projects are destroying the territories that belong to the various tranny tribes. The most notable impact is the lack of clean water, which is being diverted from the old pipes. This is causing all the various gangs to be more on edge than normal, even attacking one anothers territory in an attempt to get better water supplies.

Eddie boss, hearing about this from his former tribe mates, reaches out to Pedro Chang for help. Chang, who has recently started taking a young rebellious tranny named pook under his wing, decides to try and visit Captain Seafort to rally support.

Unfortunately the captain is not there, and he is ignored. Pedro decides to attempt to visit the monastery to reach the captain. While this is going on, PT, who feels guilty over what he perceives is his own blame in causing Jared to run away, decides to run away to look for him.

Jared's attempt to sell the information fails. And he is captured by trannies when he goes on the run in New York. Pedro Chang, acting as mediator, arranges for various tranny tribes to try to work together to fight the UN government from pushing them out of their territory.

Before they can unite against the UN, the sub tribe makes an effort to clear out the parka tribe (located in Central Park), and pressure Captain Seafort to assist them. Captain Seafort, who had sought out the Subs needing their help to find his son, and Jared, reluctantly agrees when Pedro Chang informs him that the Parka tribe are viewed as almost sub-human by most other tranny groups, due to cannibalism.

While aiding in the battle, the Subs are attacked by UN troops and local police. The attack comes about due to pressure that Arlene Seafort and Assemblyman Boland had brought to bear earlier. Using Captain Seafort's influence, they persuaded the armed forces to attack the tranny's, hoping it would allow for finding PT.

Instead it has the opposite effect, causing the subs to distrust the Captain, and results in an all-out war between the tranny gangs and the UN soldiers. In the process of this war, the UN government uses poison gas, and attempts to use the space laser cannons that were put in place to destroy asteroids and fish, to destroy parts of New York to kill the gangs.

While the gangs are fighting the government, Jared manages to convince them to let him help. He enlists other fellow hackers in an effort to bring down the global economy. PT somehow manages to avoid serious injury while looking for Jared, but in the attacks Jared's father Adam is killed.

Captain Seafort, reunited with his son, takes a stand against the United Nations government's attempt to kill those of its own people that have used as valueless. In the process, he and his son are nearly killed when they place themselves in a spacecraft, and allow themselves to drift into the line of fire of the orbital laser batteries.

Returning to earth, and realizing that he can no longer stay silent or inactive, Captain Seafort returns to political life and is elected secretary-general of the United Nations.

== Patriarch's Hope ==
Patriarch's Hope was published in 1999 as the sixth book in the saga. The book is set approximately 10 years after the events of Voices of Hope

=== Plot ===
Decades after what has since become known as the trans-pop rebellion, Seafort remains unhappy with his position as Secretary-General of the United Nations, despite the fact that he feels he can trust no one else to do what he must.

Assisted by Jarence Branstead, he has attempted to galvanize Earth's industries into completely restoring the Navy to its pre-Fish capabilities. Also attempting to respect the rights of the trans-pop community, and also serve as a moral and religious example. Unfortunately the massive industrial boom has led to an increased erosion of the Earth's habitability.

This has led to an upsurge in protests and demonstrations by eco-friendly parties, which Seafort regards with derision. His strict moralistic interpretation of the Bible causes him to regard Earth as man's property. Therefore, it is their privilege to do what they will with it, as blessed by Lord God.

During an inspection of naval facilities at Devon, several cadets are killed in what appears to be a training accident. But an investigation reveals they have been poisoned, and an Earth First terrorist organization takes credit for the attack. This galvanizes Seafort into taking an even harder stance on any supposed weakening of his policies towards the environment.

While accepting an award for his supposed moral excellence, Seafort has a bout of conscience which moves him to deny the award, citing his moral fallibility in the political revenge he has enjoyed inflicting on his enemies and adversaries. This reluctantly has the opposite effect that he intends, and instead causes the public to revere him even more.

While accepting this award Seafort has been enjoying the company of his old friend Derek Carr, now head of the government of Hope Nation, who has returned to Earth to negotiate trade deals, and enjoying the company of his old friend Alexi Tamarov, who has now been appointed as captain of the ship Melbourne.

Secretary-General Seafort, accompanied by Alexi and his wife Arlene, tours the new super ship "Galactic". The ship has been built as a massive undertaking, in an effort to demonstrate the power and superiority of the Navy and also intended to help promote colonization efforts throughout the Galaxy. The touring of the ship demonstrates to Captain Seafort just how much the Navy has shifted from when he was a boy, with the ship's design being much more relaxed, including luxury cabins, and first and second class dining and accommodations.

Whilst engaged in attempting to balance production and placate the navy, Captain Seafort becomes aware of political machinations within the navy. Some are unhappy with the Secretary-General's supposed lack of desire to use the Navy as a cudgel to beat the colonies into submission, which goes against Nick's conscience.

At the same time, Seafort comes under pressure from the head of the Earth's religious bodies, known as the Patriarchs. They feel the captain needs to crack down on the independence of the colonies, to ensure that Earth remains paramount in the universe, and that the Patriarchs do not lose any income. As he regards the Patriarchs as the voice of God on Earth this troubles the captain's conscience.

During a second meeting in New York with the Patriarchs, Seafort is injured in a terrorist attack. A bomb explodes which causes him severe injury and kills Alexi Tamarov.

The explosion causes paralysis of Seafort's lower body confining him to a wheelchair. Resenting his immobility, the Secretary-General becomes irritable and depressed.

Returning to his home compound outside DC, Seafort reluctantly accepts a cadet aide, Bevin, whom he had met earlier. Using the young cadet as a verbal punching bag for his frustration with the eco-terrorist who have claimed credit for the explosion, Seafort is additionally frustrated when Alexi Tamarov's wife brings their two children to stay with him and Arlene at the compound.

During this period of time, his son Philip Tyre attempts to reconcile their relationship. It has been strained for years, following Philip's theft of his father's personal property. Philip has grown to manhood and is in a semi-committed relationship with Jared Tenere, who has achieved mental stability thanks to hormone treatments and the parenting of Robbie Boland.

Using a combination of discipline and reward, Seafort is able to help bring Mikhail Tamarov out of his shell, assisted by Derek Carr who has come to visit at Seafort's request. Derek and Nick tell stories of Alexi to Mikhail, to help him understand his father better.

Philip manages to persuade his father to go along with him on an unscheduled tour. Philip does not tell his father where they are going, but manages to get the father to agree to go. Taking him to various spots on the globe, Philip demonstrates to the Secretary general just how uninhabitable the Earth has gotten. It culminates in a visit to Nick's boyhood home in Cardiff. Thanks to pollutants both from the local factory and from Europe, his boyhood home is uninhabitable.

This wake up call galvanizes Seafort into altering his political agenda, to help try and cut back on industry to save the world's ecosystems. Unfortunately, this also draws him negative feedback from the Navy who don't want the proposed construction of ships to be slowed down, and the patriarchs who want the Navy to remain powerful so they can enforce their vision of God's will.

Surviving another terrorist attack at his own home, from a mole that has been planted among his security, Seafort finds that he is no longer safe even in his own house. Having earlier agreed to an experimental medical procedure, that can only take place on the moon, Seafort is smuggled out of his compound and into space.

The procedure is somewhat of a success and he can begin to have feeling in his lower body and move his toes. During the recovery his home compound is bombed and he is presumed dead. Additionally the Navy announces that they have assumed control, and demand that Seafort's political agenda of eco-friendly policies be reversed.

Finding himself with no other options, Seafort declares martial law. Calling the captain of the Galactic, he demands his surrender. Captain Stanger refuses, but insists that Seafort come to see him so that they can settle things as peaceably as possible.

With the assistance of the midshipman and cadet who accompanied him into space, Mikhail Tamarov who refused to be left behind, Arlene and Derek who agreed to be reenlisted as lieutenants, his son Philip and Jared who had come to visit him in hospital, Seafort smuggles his way onto the Galactic. Using his authority as Secretary-General, he promotes himself Admiral and assigns himself command of the Galactic.

Unfortunately his subterfuge is discovered sooner than he anticipates, and his initial attempt to take over of the ship fails. Seafort is ultimately successful in killing Captain Stanger, but the casualties include cadet Bevin, and Jared Tenere.

As captain of the Galactic, Seafort fuses his ship away into the outer system, coming in contact with the Melbourne who has been on a pleasure cruise. Using the Melbourne as a smoke screen, he is able to smuggle himself into Earth's spaceport in an attempt to recapture it and persuade the men in charge to surrender.

Well this is happening, Jeffrey Thorne and Edgar Tolliver have agreed to assist Seafort in attempting to recapture the massive laser installation at Lunapolis. Using cadets as shock troopers, they attack the laser emplacements while Seafort is sneaking his way into the space station.

When the Galactic fuses back into Earth orbit in a bluff to keep the lasers from firing on the planet and to hopefully shock the commanding generals into surrendering, the general in charge of the laser emplacements orders them to fire on the Galactic instead.

Suffering drastic damage, the Galactic is ultimately destroyed. As a result of the destruction, Derek Carr and Arlene Seafort are killed. Watching both his wife and one of his oldest and dearest friends die in front of him scars Seafort's soul.

Finding himself unable to ever return to Earth again because of the drastic damage his spine has suffered, Seafort languishes until he agrees to take command of the Olympiad, Galactic's sister ship. He reluctantly agrees because he realizes that even if he retires from politics, his mere existence in home system will forever place him at the forefront of every decision that is made, granting him no peace.

Mikhail Tamarov adopts Seafort as a surrogate father, deciding to come along on the journey. Additionally his wife Arlene had frozen eggs before she died, and Seafort intends to keep the promise he made to her he will have another child, using a host mother.

With a sense of purpose as a father and a captain, Seafort says goodbye to his home planet in the knowledge that he will never return.

== Children of Hope ==
Children of Hope was published in 2001 as the seventh book in the saga. It is set several years after the events of Patriarch's Hope. It was the last in the series to be published before the death of author David Feintuch.

=== Plot ===
Derek Carr had a son, Randolph "Randy" Carr, who is the narrator of this book. Randy at 14-years-old is a mess: impulsive, angsty, with a talent for seeing the truth and sharing it bluntly. Randy still blames Nicholas Seafort for his father’s disappearance years earlier and tries to kill Seafort but fails. Seafort takes him under his wing and Randy eventually becomes Seafort's adoptive son, both ending up aboard the colossal spaceship "Olympiad". Like his adoptive father, Randy takes himself very seriously.

Meanwhile, humanity is trying to cope with the aftermath of the war with the Fish and the great secular authority of the Church. On the planet Hope humans are struggling for control. On the planet Earth the religious group called the "Patriarchs" are fighting to gain political control of Earth. Then the Fish reappear and claim peaceful intentions.

Though most hate and fear the Fish, Seafort is relieved that he does not have genocide on his conscience and he sees this as a second chance. He manages to communicate with the Fish and together they travel to Earth to avert a new war that could kill millions. They both face mutiny and excommunication, and Seafort must once again sacrifice for the good of all.

== Galahad's Hope ==
Galahad's Hope was the working title of the eighth and final book in the Seafort Saga of science fiction novels, and the sequel to Children of Hope. It has never been published.

The manuscript was reported to be completed before the death of author David Feintuch; however, Orbit UK has no current plans to publish this book. In 2013, the David Feintuch Facebook page maintained by Open Road Media stated that discussions were underway about the last book, but no further updates were given.

Conn Iggulden's forthcoming 2026 book, Nero, has a acknowledgement "To Jetti Feintuch, who let me read her father's last, unpublished book".
