= M. A. Foster =

American novelist (1939–2020)

Michael Anthony Foster
- Born: July 2, 1939
- Died: November 14, 2020 (aged 81)
- Known for: science fiction writer

Michael Anthony Foster (July 2, 1939 – November 14, 2020) was an American science fiction writer from Greensboro, North Carolina. He spent over sixteen years as a captain and Russian linguist in the United States Air Force.

== "Ler" books ==
Foster wrote a loosely connected trilogy about an offshoot of humanity called the Ler: The Warriors of Dawn (1975), The Gameplayers of Zan (1977), and The Day of The Klesh (1979). The Gameplayers of Zan takes place much earlier than the others, on Earth, and details the Ler's departure from Earth; the other two books cover two separate human-Ler encounters on other planets. The "game" from the title of The Gameplayers of Zan is based on cellular automata, a more intricate version of Conway's Game of Life.

The Warriors of Dawn mostly concerns the relationship between a human man and a ler woman, and The Day of The Klesh represents the ler as a mostly inscrutable humanoid race. The Gameplayers of Zan, on the other hand, discusses the origins of the Ler as an engineered offshoot of humanity, and is as much about ler culture as their interactions with humanity. Most of the action in this book takes place in Unwharrie National Forest, North Carolina.

Ler reproduce infrequently, only becoming fertile at age thirty after a long adolescence: they experience two fertility periods, five years apart. Hence most ler females have only two children, but occasionally they have a third, and twins are not unknown.

Ler family structure is organized around a "braid," which they have designed to preserve maximum genetic diversity to offset their low initial population and small birth rate. A braid starts with two "fore-parents". They mate and produce the "elder outsibling". Then each of the fore-parents goes forth and brings back another ler of the appropriate gender, the "after-parents". The fore-parents each mate with an after-parent and produce the "insiblings", five years younger than the elder outsibling. Then the after-parents mate and produce the "younger outsibling", five years younger than the insiblings. The insiblings remain in the braid and become the fore-parents to the next generation; the outsiblings will leave to join other braids as after-parents. The rare surplus children tend to be given the responsibility of beginning completely new braids together. Alternation in the gender of children is enforced with pheromones. In rare cases, sometimes on purpose, two same-sex insiblings are born; the braid line ends there, as all four children must weave into other braids as after-parents.

Ler communicate mainly using a verbal language called Singlespeech. Each ler has a name consisting of three syllables, e.g. "Maellenkleth", though their intimates sometimes use shortened versions of the name. Various categories of objects always have names with the same numbers of syllables, e.g. stars have four-syllable names. As in the Chinese language, each Singlespeech syllable has four possible meanings, but unlike Chinese, Singlespeech is not a tonal language. Instead, each Singlespeech word has four "modes" corresponding to the four classical Greek elements (Earth, Air, Fire, Water), with each mode having a symbolic meaning borrowed from the Divinatory tarot, and complex grammatical rules govern the allowed transitions from mode to mode. The meanings of Singlespeech words are therefore highly context-dependent, and careful attention must be paid to mode transitions during a conversation.

Elemental symbolism extends also to the meanings of ler personal names, but each individual keeps their "governing element" a secret; this latter custom complicates ler marriage negotiations, since each foreparent must choose the other foreparents' second (afterparent) mate, and the governing elements of each foreparent/afterparent mating must be complementary: Earth with Air, and Fire with Water.

There is also a less frequently used mode of communication called Multispeech, which uses all the available communication channels, verbal and nonverbal, to convey information in a much more detailed fashion than Singlespeech ever could.

After the completion of the Ler trilogy, Foster continued to work on the development and explication of Singlespeech, which he renamed Layaklan (which name back-translates to 'Understanding' in English). A substantial Layaklan-to-English lexicon and an outline of a corresponding English-to-Layaklan lexicon (both of which were written by Foster), accompanied by supporting articles concerning Layaklan, were available online but were subsequently lost.

== The Morphodite Trilogy ==
This series consists of: The Morphodite (1981), Transformer (1983), and Preserver (1985). The title character is a reluctant assassin who can change forms, invariably alternating sex and decreasing in age as he/she does so. The stories themselves are centered on either a different planet or in space, with short segues that lead the reader from place to place.

In The Morphodite, we discover the initial character, Rael, as a fearsome assassin who has never been unleashed upon the world. He (as he/she then is) is caged in "The Mask Factory", and his captors fear him much more than any of their other creations. Rael is not a bioengineered assassin: he/she instead initiates Change through a form of meditation. The process of Change is similar to a small death without the "ever after" aspects of it, and is quite painful—not something Rael does lightly. Additionally, Change involves a forced decrease in age of 10 to 20 years, limiting the number of Changes possible in a short period of time. We discover why Rael is so feared shortly after "his" introduction--"he" has evolved a scientific method of predicting or divining the future. Most particularly, this art can identify the single person whose death would precipitate a societal change. That art is elaborated in Transformer, but in brief it is likened to a version of the I Ching that is both scientifically rigorous and orders of magnitude more complex. This divination tool is referred to as "the art" through the books. The Morphodite depicts Rael's unleashing on the unchanging world of Oerlikon and the changes he/she thereby unleashes upon it.

Oerlikon is an out-of-the way world that has gathered a group of people who desire to suppress change. In order to do so, they have a highly regimented society and the equivalent of a police state. This unchanging state is artificially enabled by an outside party that has stationed researchers throughout Oerlikon. Rael changes Oelikon by killing one of the observers using his/her assassin skills and his divination art. As the first domino begins to tumble, the observed suddenly become aware of the observers, and interrogations of captured observers lead society into a spiral of self-destruction. Rael then initiates Change and becomes Damistofina, a younger, female version of his then-current self. But Damistofina is eventually identified as the Morphodite and pursued, leading her to kill her pursuer and Change yet again, this time to Phaedrus, a yet-younger male. Eventually the upheaval grinds to a halt and Phaedrus gathers small groups of refugees to himself, becoming a sort of mind-healer. He does not go on to be king or gain immense power; instead, he is at peace.

In The Transformer, we resume where Phaedrus left off, content with his life, a few adopted children and a gather-woman. He is recognized as an adviser to the local ruler because of his efforts at providing peace. Unfortunately, there is more to the researchers than we originally supposed. Before Phaedrus was Rael, he was a woman named Jedily Tulily. Jedily was originally an observer who somehow displeased the Regents of Heliarctos and was dumped into The Mask Factory to be used up as a test subject. Upon discovering that Phaedrus still exists, they dispatch assassins to destroy him. Through a convenient quirk of fate, Phaedrus is summoned to the local ruler when the attempt occurs. His lover and adopted children are not so lucky. Initiating Change again, Phaedrus becomes Nazarine, a young woman who is barely out of her teens. Nazarine realizes both that she cannot Change again without becoming an infant and that the Regents (unknown to her at this point) won't stop trying to kill her.

Following back through her past, she recovers some of the documents from The Mask Factory that lets her determine that Jedily was an off-world observer. After making that connection, Nazarine travels to the only spaceport, intent on traveling off-planet. She purchases a ticket on a ship while the Regents' assassins follow closely behind. One of her companions is killed by an assassin but gives up her new name in the process. Faren Kiricky, a ship tech, and Dorje, a ship security officer, befriend Nazarine and help her to identify the assassins. After using her art of divination, Nazarine confronts the data processor of the assassin pair and convinces her that Nazarine already knows how to win. In despair, the data processor commits suicide. The killer of the assassin pair evades capture by entering the bowels of the ship. Nazarine and Faren track and finally confront him. Nazarine tells him that no matter what he does, his actions will actually destroy the Regents - and then she lets him go. Nazarine discloses what she is to Faren and asks Faren to take care of her. Faren agrees, and Nazarine initiates Change resulting in a male infant.

== Others ==
Foster also wrote the standalone novel Waves (1980), and four novelettes collected in Owl Time (1985).

Foster wrote an occasional column for Acme Comics called Eyeless In Gaza.

== Death ==
M. A. Foster died on November 14, 2020, at the age of 81.

== Bibliography ==
=== Ler ===
1. The Warriors of Dawn (1975)
2. The Gameplayers of Zan (1977)
3. The Day of the Klesh (1979)

The Book of the Ler (2006) collects the Ler trilogy

=== Transformer ===
1. The Morphodite (1981)
2. Transformer (1983)
3. Preserver (1985)

The Transformer Trilogy (2006) collects the Transformer trilogy

=== Stand-alone novels ===
- Waves (1980)

=== Collections ===
- Owl Time (1985)
