= The Etched City =

2003 novel by K. J. Bishop

The Etched City is the first novel (and the only one published to date) of the Australian science-fiction writer K. J. Bishop. It was published for the first time by Prime Books in 2003 (cover art done by Bishop herself), then by Tor/Pan Macmillan (in 2004 and 2005) and by Bantam Spectra (in 2004). Translations into Italian, Polish, Spanish, Croatian, Serbian, Dutch, Romanian, French, Traditional Chinese, German and Czech have appeared.

== Analysis ==
The Etched City is a fantasy about love, unexplainable magics, and exile.

The novel has a style often described as New Weird, similar to the works of China Miéville. It is set in a society with a vaguely Victorian technology level. We read about two old friends, Raule, a healer, and Gwynn, a bounty hunter, running from their homeland of Copper Country, chased by the winning side of the civil war they fought in. They reach the city of Ashamoil to start a new life, but they face unexpected and surreal trials.

The first few chapters show the pair moving together through Copper Country, a region with a part-Wild West, part-Arabian feel. They arrive and part ways in Ashamoil, a city which initially seems to be an alternate early 19th-century city with a colonial twist. But, as the fantasy elements of the novel slowly show themselves as the story progresses, we discover that it is a difficult city to pin down. Raule finds work in a slum hospital staffed by nuns, spending her time attempting to understand why so many deformed babies are born in her ward, in between stitching up local teenagers participating in skilled territorial knife fights. Gwynn is employed by a powerful criminal "family" dealing in slaves, along with his old friend from his homeland in the icy north. When not running errands for the ruthless master of this syndicate, Gwynn pursues an otherworldly woman who used him as inspiration for an art piece.

The story covers various themes including; characters speaking in poetic tones about religion, karma, and death. The story also covers the topic of personal vendettas being carried out by characters.

== Publications ==
=== English ===
- 2003 (February), publisher Prime Books, cover art by K. J. Bishop
- 2004, publisher Tor / Pan Macmillan UK
- 2004 (December), publisher Bantam Spectra, cover art by Paul You'll
- 2005 (February), publisher Tor / Pan Macmillan UK

== Reviews ==
- William Thompson (2003) in Interzone, #190, July-August 2003
- Faren Miller (2003) in The New York Review of Science Fiction, July 2003
- James Sallis (2003) in The Magazine of Fantasy & Science Fiction, August 2003
- Gahan Wilson (2003) in Realms of Fantasy, October 2003
- Greg Beatty (2003) in The New York Review of Science Fiction, December 2003
- Michael Moorcock (2004) in The Guardian, January 2004
- Sue Thomason (2004) in Vector 235
- John C. Bunnell (2004) in Amazing Stories, December 2004
- Vector 241

== Awards ==
- 2003 - Nomination for the Aurealis Award, Fantasy Novel
- 2004 - Place 3 Locus Poll Award, Best First Novel
- 2004 - Nomination for the World Fantasy Award, Best Novel
