= Utopia, LOL? =

"Utopia, LOL" is a 2017 science fiction short story by Jamie Wahls. It was first published in Strange Horizons.

== Synopsis ==
After Charlie is revived from suspended animation, Kit/dinaround is his guide to the distant future.

== Reception ==
"Utopia, LOL" was a finalist for the Nebula Award for Best Short Story of 2017.

Tangent Online observed that despite Kit's essentially "scatterbrained" nature, the story ends on a "serious, and even inspiring" note. Locus considered it to be "very nice", with a "resolution that snaps home beautifully", but criticized Wahls' portrayal of Kit as having a "somewhat anachronistic contemporary voice (text-speak, essentially)" (while conceding that this could most likely be explained away as a translation).
