= Jesse Miller (writer) =

American science fiction author

Jesse Miller is an American science fiction author. His writing career began in 1972, shortly after he left the United States Air Force.

In 1974, he was a finalist for the second ever John W. Campbell Award for Best New Writer, for his story "Pigeon City".

He served in the Air Force for four years until he was 21.

He subsequently described his career as "After getting out of the service, I wrote three stories and sold three stories. I had never tried to sell my writing before that time. I was batting 1000 in an arena where some may spend a life time and never get a hit. I knew no different."
