= A Series of Steaks =

2017 short story by Vina Jie-Min Prasad

"A Series of Steaks" is a science fiction story by Singaporean writer Vina Jie-Min Prasad. It was first published in Clarkesworld, in January 2017.

== Plot summary ==
Helena uses bioprinting to forge expensive cuts of beef... until she is blackmailed by a client with a particularly difficult request.

== Reception ==
A Series of Steaks was a finalist for the Nebula Award for Best Novelette of 2017, the 2018 Hugo Award for Best Novelette, and the 2018 Theodore Sturgeon Award. Tangent Online commended Prasad's portrayal of Helena, and the overall "flow" of the story, but felt that it "drag(ged) a little in the middle."
