= Fandom for Robots =

2017 short story by Vina Jie-Min Prasad

"Fandom for Robots" is a 2017 science fiction short story by Vina Jie-Min Prasad. It was first published in Uncanny Magazine.

== Synopsis ==
Computron — the world's first and only sentient robot — discovers anime, online fandom, and fan fiction.

== Reception ==
"Fandom for Robots" was a finalist for the Nebula Award for Best Short Story in 2017 and the 2018 Hugo Award for Best Short Story. Tangent Online considered it to be "a feel-good tale with good humor and heart".
