= Codex Writers Group =

Speculative Fiction Writing Circle

The Codex Writers' Group, also known as Codex, is an online community of active speculative fiction writers. Codex was created in January 2004 and won the 2022 Locus Special Award.

== History and membership requirements ==
Codex was created in January 2004 by Quinn Reid, a member of Orson Scott Card's 2001 Literary Boot Camp. The focus of the group is on writers in the early stages of their careers.

The workshop previously used the phrase 'neo-pro' to identify members, but now describes itself as bringing together "pro-level speculative fiction writers at all stages of their careers who are actively writing". Members are referred to as Codexians.

== Notable members ==
A number of current or former members of Codex have won or been nominated for major awards, including the Nebula Award, Hugo Award, and Locus Award:

- Aliette de Bodard, author of the Obsidian and Blood books, Nebula and Locus Award winner
- Nancy Fulda, author of the Nebula- and Hugo-nominated short story "Movement"
- A. T. Greenblatt, author of the Hugo-winning novelette "Burn or the Episodic Life of Sam Wells as Super" and the Nebula-winning short story "Give the Family My Love"
- José Pablo Iriarte, author of Nebula Award-nominated short story "Proof by Induction" and Nebula Award- and James Tiptree Award-nominated novelette "The Substance of My Lives, the Accidents of Our Births"
- Ken Liu, author of "The Paper Menagerie", which won the Nebula, the Hugo and the World Fantasy Awards, and The Grace of Kings and translator of The Three-Body Problem
- Sarah Pinsker, Nebula award-winning author of A Song for a New Day and the Nebula- and Hugo-winning "Two Truths and a Lie", among other award-nominated and -winning novelettes, novellas, and short stories
- Lawrence M. Schoen, author of several Nebula-nominated novellas, and founder of the Klingon Language Institute
- Elsa Sjunneson, editor of Disabled People Destroy Science Fiction, issue #24 of Uncanny Magazine, which won the 2019 Hugo Award for Best Semiprozine and the 2019 Aurora Award for Best Related Work and nominee for the 2019 Nebula Award for Best Game Writing for the Fate Accessibility Toolkit
- Merc Fenn Wolfmoor, author of multiple award-nominated works, including "This is Not a Wardrobe Door" and "How to Become a Robot in 12 Easy Steps"
- Caroline M. Yoachim, author of multiple award-nominated works, including works nominated for the Nebula
