= Greg Norman (disambiguation) =

Greg Norman (born 1955) is an Australian entrepreneur and retired professional golfer.

Greg Norman may also refer to:

== Golf related ==
- Greg Norman Holden International, a golf tournament held annually from 1993 to 2001
- Greg Norman Medal, an Australian golf award established in 2015
- Greg Norman's Golf Power, a golf-simulation video game published in 1992

== People ==
- Gregory Norman Bossert (born 1962), American writer and filmmaker
- Gregory Norman Ham (1953–2012), Australian musician, songwriter, and actor
- Gregory Norman Mahle (born 1993), American professional baseball pitcher

== Other ==
- 16046 Gregnorman, a minor planet discovered in 1999

== See also ==
- Greg Gorman (born 1949), American portrait photographer of Hollywood celebrities
- Norman Gregg (1892–1966), Australian ophthalmologist and discoverer of congenital rubella syndrome
- Greg Orman (born 1968), American politician, businessman, and entrepreneur
