= The Architecture of Fear =

- Editors: Peter D. Pautz, Kathryn Cramer
- Cover artist: J. K. Potter
- Language: English
- Genre: Fantasy, Horror
- Publisher: Arbor House
- Publication date: 1987
- Publication place: United States
- Media type: Print (hardback)
- Pages: xii, 304
- ISBN: 0-87795-921-8
- OCLC: 15591594

The Architecture of Fear is an anthology of horror stories edited by Peter D. Pautz and Kathryn Cramer. It was published by Arbor House in October 1987. The anthology contains, among several other stories, the Gene Wolfe short story "In the House of Gingerbread", which was original to the anthology and was nominated for a World Fantasy Award for Best Short Story. The anthology itself won the 1988 World Fantasy Award for Best Anthology.

== Contents ==
- Introduction (The Architecture of Fear), by Peter D. Pautz
- "In the House of Gingerbread", by Gene Wolfe
- "Where the Heart Is", by Ramsey Campbell
- "Ellen, in Her Time", by Charles L. Grant
- "Nesting Instinct", by Scott Baker
- "Endless Night", by Karl Edward Wagner
- "Trust Me", by Joseph Lyons
- "The Fetch", by Robert Aickman
- "Visitors", by Jack Dann
- "Gentlemen", by Craig Spector and John Skipp
- "Down in the Darkness", by Dean R. Koontz
- "Haunted", by Joyce Carol Oates
- "In the Memory Room", by Michael Bishop
- "Tales from the Original Gothic", by John M. Ford
- "The House That Knew No Hate", by Jessica Amanda Salmonson
- Afterword: Houses of the Mind (The Architecture of Fear), by Kathryn Cramer
- A Guide to Significant Works of Architectural Horror, by uncredited

== Reprints ==
- Avon, January 1989.
