= Ignyte Award for Outstanding Short Story =

Annual literary award for speculative fiction

- Awarded for: Works between 2,000 and 7,499 words
- Country: United States
- Presented by: FIYAH Literary Magazine
- First award: 2020; 6 years ago
- Most recent winner: Albert Nkereuwem ("Commensalism, Or the Labyrinth's Vessels")
- Website: ignyteawards.fiyahlitmag.com

The Ignyte Award for Outstanding Short Story is a literary award given annually as part of the Ignyte Awards.

== Winners and finalists ==
* Winners

Year	Author	Work	Publisher	Ref.
2020	Rebecca Roanhorse*	"A Brief Lesson in Native American Astronomy"	The Mythic Dream	
2020	Christopher Caldwell	"Canst Thou Draw Out the Leviathan"	Uncanny Magazine, May–June 2019	
2020	Suyi Davies Okungbowa	"Dune Song"	Apex, May 2019	
2020	Shiv Ramdas	"And Now His Lordship Is Laughing"	Strange Horizons, September 2019	
2020	Nibedita Sen	"Ten Excerpts from an Annotated Bibliography on the Cannibal Women of Ratnabar Island"	Nightmare Magazine, May 2019	
2021	C. L. Clark*	"You Perfect, Broken Thing"	Uncanny Magazine, January–February 2020	
2021	Congyun 'Mu Ming' Gu (author)	"Express to Beijing West Railway Station | 开往西站的特别列车"	Samovar, October 2020	
2021	Kiera Johnson (translator)	"Express to Beijing West Railway Station | 开往西站的特别列车"	Samovar, October 2020	
2021	Innocent Chizaram Ilo	"Rat and Finch Are Friends"	Strange Horizons, March 2020	
2021	Nicasio Andres Reed	"Body, Remember"	Fireside, November 2020	
2021	Eugenia Triantafyllou	"My Country is a Ghost"	Uncanny Magazine, January–February 2020	
2022	P. Djèlí Clark*	"If the Martians Have Magic"	Uncanny Magazine	
2022	Martin Cahill	"The Fifth Horseman"	Fireside, October 2021	
2022	Kel Coleman	"Delete Your Memory for Free"	FIYAH, Winter 2021	
2022	Tobi Ogundiran	"The Tale of Jaja and Canti"	Lightspeed, August 2021	
2022	Nadia Shammas	"The Center of the Universe"	Strange Horizons, March 2021	
2023	Tobi Ogundiran*	"The Lady of the Yellow Painted Library"	Africa Risen	
2023	Fawaz Al-Matrouk	"The Voice of a Thousand Years"	F&SF, May–June 2022	
2023	Grace Fong	"Girl Oil"	Tor.com. February 2022	
2023	LP Kindred	"Wanderlust"	Anathema, August 2022	
2023	Malka Older	"The Locked Pod"	The Sunday Morning Transport, September 2022	
2024	Oluwatomiwa Ajeigbe*	"A Witch's Transition in the City of Ghosts"	Beneath Ceaseless Skies	
2024	R. S. A. Garcia	"Tantie Merle and the Farmhand 4200"	Uncanny Magazine, July 2023	
2024	Kemi Ashing-Giwa	"Thin Ice"	Clarkesworld Magazine, November 2023	
2024	Cynthia Gómez	"Lips Like Sugar"	Luna Station Quarterly, September 2023	
2024	Thomas Ha	"Window Boy"	Clarkesworld Magazine, August 2023	
2025	Caroline M. Yoachim*	"We Will Teach You How to Read | We Will Teach You How To Read"	Lightspeed Magazine	
2025	J. L. Akagi	"Whale Fall"	Strange Horizons, September 2024	
2025	Stephen Graham Jones	"Parthenogenesis"	Reactor, October 2024	
2025	B. Pladek	"The Spindle of Necessity"	Strange Horizons, May 2024	
2025	Nibedita Sen	"Agni"	The Sunday Morning Transport, January 2024	
2026	Albert Nkereuwem*	"Commensalism, Or the Labyrinth's Vessels"	Will This Be a Problem? Issue V	
2026	M.L. Krishnan	"Ichthyosis"	Fantasy, January 2025	
2026	Aimee Ogden	"Because I Held His Name Like a Key"	Strange Horizons, June 2025	
2026	Champ Wongsatayanont	"Autogas Ferryman"	Nightmare, September 2025	
2026	Hannah Yang	"The Octopus Dreams of Personhood"	Diabolical Plots, April 2025	
