= World Fantasy Award—Short Fiction =

Literary award for science fiction or fantasy short fiction in English

- Awarded for: The best fantasy story of 10,000 words or less published in English in the prior calendar year
- Presented by: World Fantasy Convention
- First award: 1975
- Most recent winner: Renan Bernardo ("The Hungry Mouth at the Edge of Space and the Goddess Knitting at Home")
- Website: worldfantasy.org/awards/

The World Fantasy Awards are given each year by the World Fantasy Convention for the best fantasy fiction published in English during the previous calendar year. The awards have been described by book critics such as The Guardian as a "prestigious fantasy prize", and one of the three most prestigious speculative fiction awards, along with the Hugo and Nebula Awards (which cover both fantasy and science fiction). The World Fantasy Award—Short Fiction is given each year for fantasy short stories published in English. A work of fiction is defined by the organization as short fiction if it is 10,000 words or less in length; awards are also given out for longer pieces in the Novel and Long Fiction categories. The Short Fiction category has been awarded annually since 1975, though before 1982—when the category was instated—it was named "Best Short Fiction" and covered works of up to 40,000 words. It was then renamed "Best Short Story" until 2016, when it was renamed to the "Short Fiction" category.

World Fantasy Award nominees and winners are decided by attendees and judges at the annual World Fantasy Convention. A ballot is posted in June for attendees of the current and previous two conferences to determine two of the finalists, and a panel of five judges adds three or more nominees before voting on the overall winner. The panel of judges is typically made up of fantasy authors and is chosen each year by the World Fantasy Awards Administration, which has the power to break ties. The final results are presented at the World Fantasy Convention at the end of October. Winners were presented with a statue in the form of a bust of H. P. Lovecraft through the 2015 awards; more recent winners receive a statuette of a tree.

During the 52 nomination years, 193 authors have had works nominated; 53 of them have won, including ties and co-authors. Only five authors have won more than once: Ramsey Campbell and James Blaylock with two wins out of four nominations each, Stephen King won two out of three, and Tanith Lee and Fred Chappell won both times they were nominated. Of authors who have won at least once, Jeffrey Ford and Kelly Link have the most nominations at five, followed by Dennis Etchison and Avram Davidson, who along with Campbell and Blaylock received four nominations. Charles de Lint has the most nominations without winning at five; he is followed by Michael Swanwick, who has had four nominations without winning.

== Winners and nominees ==
In the following table, the years correspond to the date of the ceremony, rather than when the work was first published. Each year links to the corresponding "year in literature". Entries with a yellow background and an asterisk (*) next to the writer's name have won the award; the other entries are the other nominees on the shortlist.

* Winners

Winners and nominees
Year	Author	Work	Publisher/publication	Ref.
1975	Robert Aickman*	"Pages from a Young Girl's Journal"	The Magazine of Fantasy & Science Fiction	
1975	T. E. D. Klein	"The Events at Poroth Farm"	The Year's Best Horror Stories: Series II (DAW Books)	
1975	Sterling E. Lanier	"A Father's Tale"	The Magazine of Fantasy & Science Fiction	
1975	Karl Edward Wagner	"Sticks"	Whispers	
1976	Fritz Leiber*	"Belsen Express"	The Second Book of Fritz Leiber (DAW Books)	
1976	David Drake	"The Barrow Troll"	Whispers	
1976	Brian Lumley	"Born of the Winds"	The Magazine of Fantasy & Science Fiction	
1976	Manly Wade Wellman	"The Ghastly Priest Doth Reign"	The Magazine of Fantasy & Science Fiction	
1977	Russell Kirk*	"There's a Long, Long Trail A-Winding"	Frights (St. Martin's Press)	
1977	Ramsey Campbell	"The Companion"	Frights (St. Martin's Press)	
1977	Fritz Leiber	"Dark Wings"	Superhorror (W. H. Allen)	
1977	Dennis Etchison	"It Only Comes Out at Night"	Frights (St. Martin's Press)	
1977	Karl Edward Wagner	"Two Suns Setting"	Fantastic	
1977	Robert Sheckley	"What Is Life?"	Playboy	
1978	Ramsey Campbell*	"The Chimney"	Whispers (Doubleday)	
1978	Jack Vance	"The Bagful of Dreams"	Flashing Swords! 4: Barbarians and Black Magicians (Doubleday)	
1978	Harlan Ellison	"Jeffty Is Five"	The Magazine of Fantasy & Science Fiction	
1978	Ramsey Campbell	"Loveman's Comeback"	More Devil's Kisses (Corgi)	
1978	Avram Davidson	"Manatee Gal Ain't You Coming Out Tonight"	The Magazine of Fantasy & Science Fiction	
1978	Charles L. Grant	"When All the Children Call My Name"	The Year's Best Horror Stories: Series V (DAW Books)	
1979	Avram Davidson*	"Naples"	Shadows (Doubleday)	
1979	Avram Davidson	"A Good Night's Sleep"	The Magazine of Fantasy & Science Fiction	
1979	Charles L. Grant	"Hear Me Now, My Sweet Abbey Rose"	The Magazine of Fantasy & Science Fiction	
1979	Larry Niven	The Magic Goes Away	Ace Books	
1979	Michael Bishop	"Within the Walls of Tyre"	Weirdbook	
1980	Ramsey Campbell*	"Mackintosh Willy"	Shadows 2 (Doubleday)	
1980	Elizabeth A. Lynn*	"The Woman Who Loved the Moon"	Amazons! (DAW Books)	
1980	Fritz Leiber	"The Button Molder"	Whispers	
1980	T. E. D. Klein	"Petey"	Shadows 2 (Doubleday)	
1980	William F. Nolan	"Saturday's Shadow"	Shadows 2 (Doubleday)	
1981	Howard Waldrop*	"The Ugly Chickens"	Universe 10 (Doubleday)	
1981	Chelsea Quinn Yarbro	"Cabin 33"	Shadows 3 (Doubleday)	
1981	T. E. D. Klein	"Children of the Kingdom"	Dark Forces (Viking Press)	
1981	Suzy McKee Charnas	"Unicorn Tapestry"	New Dimensions 11 (Pocket Books)	
1982	Dennis Etchison*	"The Dark Country"	Fantasy Tales	
1982	Stephen King*	"Do the Dead Sing?"	Yankee	
1982	Charles L. Grant	"Coin of the Realm"	Tales from the Nightside (Arkham House)	
1982	Jack Dann	"Fairy Tale"	The Berkley Showcase Vol. 4 (Berkley Books)	
1983	Tanith Lee*	"The Gorgon"	Shadows 5 (Doubleday)	
1983	Dennis Etchison	"Deathtracks"	Death (Playboy Paperbacks)	
1983	Steve Rasnic Tem	"Firestorm"	Perpetual Light (Warner Books)	
1983	Michael Swanwick	"The Man Who Met Picasso"	Omni	
1983	Greg Bear	"Petra"	Omni	
1984	Tanith Lee*	"Elle Est Trois, (La Mort)"	Whispers IV (Doubleday)	
1984	David Morrell	The Hundred-Year Christmas	Donald M. Grant	
1984	Karl Edward Wagner	"Into Whose Hands"	Whispers IV (Doubleday)	
1984	Leigh Kennedy	"The Silent Cradle"	Shadows 6 (Doubleday)	
1984	Lucius Shepard	"Solitario's Eyes"	The Magazine of Fantasy & Science Fiction	
1984	William F. Wu	"Wong's Lost and Found Emporium"	Amazing Stories	
1985	Alan Ryan*	"The Bones Wizard"	Whispers	
1985	Scott Baker*	"Still Life with Scorpion"	Asimov's Science Fiction	
1985	Jack Dann	"Bad Medicine"	Asimov's Science Fiction	
1985	Robert R. McCammon	"Nightcrawlers"	Masques (Maclay & Associates)	
1986	James Blaylock*	"Paper Dragons"	Imaginary Lands (Ace Books)	
1986	Lucius Shepard	"The Jaguar Hunter"	The Magazine of Fantasy & Science Fiction	
1986	Sharon N. Farber	"Return of the Dust Vampires"	Whispers V (Doubleday)	
1986	Avram Davidson	"The Slovo Stove"	Universe 15 (Doubleday)	
1987	David Schow*	"Red Light"	The Twilight Zone Magazine	
1987	Nancy Springer	"The Boy Who Plaited Manes"	The Magazine of Fantasy & Science Fiction	
1987	Michael Blumlein	"The Brains of Rats"	Interzone	
1987	Stephen King	"The End of the Whole Mess"	Omni	
1987	Whitley Strieber	"Pain"	Cutting Edge (Doubleday)	
1987	Amyas Naegele	"The Rise and Fall of Father Alex"	The Magazine of Fantasy & Science Fiction	
1987	Les Daniels	"They're Coming for You"	Cutting Edge (Doubleday)	
1987	Joe R. Lansdale	"Tight Little Stitches in a Dead Man's Back"	Nukes: Four Horror Writers on the Ultimate Horror (Maclay & Associates)	
1988	Jonathan Carroll*	"Friend's Best Man"	Fantasy & Science Fiction	
1988	Pat Cadigan	"Angel"	Asimov's Science Fiction	
1988	Garry Kilworth	"Hogfoot Right and Bird-hands"	Other Edens (Allen & Unwin)	
1988	Gene Wolfe	"In the House of Gingerbread"	The Architecture of Fear (Arbor House)	
1988	David Schow	"Pamela's Get"	The Twilight Zone Magazine	
1988	Douglas E. Winter	"Splatter: A Cautionary Tale"	Masques II (Maclay & Associates)	
1989	John M. Ford*	"Winter Solstice, Camelot Station"	Invitation to Camelot (Ace Books)	
1989	Lucius Shepard	"Life of Buddha"	Omni	
1989	Dan Simmons	"Metastasis"	Night Visions 5 (Orion Publishing Group)	
1989	Joe R. Lansdale	"Night They Missed the Horror Show"	Silver Scream (Dark Harvest)	
1990	Steven Millhauser*	"The Illusionist"	Esquire	
1990	Michael Swanwick	"The Edge of the World"	Full Spectrum 2 (Doubleday)	
1990	Jonathan Carroll	"Mr. Fiddlehead"	Omni	
1990	Edward Bryant	"A Sad Last Love at the Diner of the Damned"	Book of the Dead (Bantam Books)	
1990	Scott Baker	"Varicose Worms"	Blood Is Not Enough (William Morrow and Company)	
1990	Chet Williamson	"Yore Skin's Jes's Soft 'n Purty...He Said."	Razored Saddles (Dark Harvest)	
1991	Neil Gaiman*	"A Midsummer Night's Dream"	The Sandman #19 (DC Comics)	
1991	Charles Vess*	"A Midsummer Night's Dream"	The Sandman #19 (DC Comics)	
1991	Terry Bisson	"Bears Discover Fire"	Asimov's Science Fiction	
1991	Thomas Ligotti	"The Last Feast of Harlequin"	Fantasy & Science Fiction	
1991	Elizabeth Massie	"Stephen"	Borderlands (Maclay & Associates)	
1992	Fred Chappell*	"The Somewhere Doors"	More Shapes Than One (St. Martin's Press)	
1992	James Blaylock	"The Better Boy"	Asimov's Science Fiction	
1992	Tim Powers	"The Better Boy"	Asimov's Science Fiction	
1992	Charles de Lint	"The Conjure Man"	After the King: Stories in Honor of J.R.R. Tolkien (Tor Books)	
1992	Charles de Lint	"Pity the Monsters"	The Ultimate Frankenstein (Dell Publishing)	
1993	Joe Haldeman*	"Graves"	Fantasy & Science Fiction	
1993	Dan Simmons*	"This Year's Class Picture"	Still Dead (Mark V. Ziesing)	
1993	Lisa Goldstein	"Alfred"	Asimov's Science Fiction	
1993	Martha Soukup	"The Arbitrary Placement of Walls"	Asimov's Science Fiction	
1993	Charles de Lint	"Bridges"	Fantasy & Science Fiction	
1993	Poppy Z. Brite	"Calcutta, Lord of Nerves"	Still Dead (Mark V. Ziesing)	
1993	Nicholas A. DiChario	"The Winterberry"	Alternate Kennedys (Tor Books)	
1994	Fred Chappell*	The Lodger	Necronomicon Press	
1994	Dan Simmons	"Death in Bangkok"	Playboy	
1994	Terry Bisson	"England Underway"	Omni	
1994	Les Daniels	"The Little Green Ones"	After the Darkness (Maclay & Associates)	
1994	Charles de Lint	"The Moon Is Drowning While I Sleep"	Snow White, Blood Red (William Morrow and Company)	
1994	Ian McDonald	"Some Strange Desire"	Omni Best Science Fiction Three (Omni Books)	
1994	Terry Lamsley	"Something Worse"	Under the Crust (Wendigo)	
1994	Neil Gaiman	"Troll Bridge"	Snow White, Blood Red (William Morrow and Company)	
1995	Stephen King*	"The Man in the Black Suit"	The New Yorker	
1995	Michael Swanwick	"The Changeling's Tale"	Asimov's Science Fiction	
1995	Nicholas Royle	"The Homecoming"	Shadows Over Innsmouth (Fedogan & Bremer)	
1995	Steven Millhauser	"The Sisterhood of Night"	Harper's Magazine	
1995	Michael Marshall Smith	"To Receive Is Better"	The Mammoth Book of Frankenstein (Carroll & Graf Publishers)	
1996	Gwyneth Jones*	"The Grass Princess"	Seven Tales and a Fable (Edgewood Press)	
1996	Petrina Smith	"Angel Thing"	She's Fantastical (Sybylla Feminist Press)	
1996	S. P. Somtow	"Dragon's Fin Soup"	The Ultimate Dragon (Dell Publishing)	
1996	Douglas E. Winter	"Loop"	Dark Love (Roc Books)	
1996	Robert Charles Wilson	"The Perseids"	Northern Frights 3 (Mosaic Press)	
1996	Kit Reed	"The Singing Marine"	Fantasy & Science Fiction	
1997	James Blaylock*	"Thirteen Phantasms"	Omni Online	
1997	Dennis Etchison	"The Dead Cop"	Dark Terrors 2 (Victor Gollancz Ltd)	
1997	Graham Masterton	"Underbed"	Dark Terrors 2 (Victor Gollancz Ltd)	
1998	P. D. Cacek*	"Dust Motes"	Gothic Ghosts (Tor Books)	
1998	Jack Womack	"Audience"	The Horns of Elfland (Roc Books)	
1998	Lisa Goldstein	"Fortune and Misfortune"	Asimov's Science Fiction	
1998	Paul Park	"Get a Grip"	Omni Online	
1998	Robert Charles Wilson	"The Inner Inner City"	Northern Frights 4 (Mosaic Press)	
1999	Kelly Link*	"The Specialist's Hat"	Event Horizon	
1999	Ellen Kushner	"The Death of the Duke"	Starlight 2 (Tor Books)	
1999	John Kessel	"Every Angel is Terrifying"	Fantasy & Science Fiction	
1999	Neil Gaiman	"Shoggoth's Old Peculiar"	Smoke and Mirrors (Avon Publications)	
1999	Kelly Link	"Travels with the Snow Queen"	Lady Churchill's Rosebud Wristlet	
2000	Ian R. MacLeod*	"The Chop Girl"	Asimov's Science Fiction	
2000	Kim Newman	"Amerikanski Dead at the Moscow Morgue"	999: New Stories of Horror and Suspense (Avon Books)	
2000	Howard Waldrop	"The Dynasters Vol. 1: On the Downs"	Fantasy & Science Fiction	
2000	Eleanor Arnason	"The Grammarian's Five Daughters"	Realms of Fantasy	
2000	Robert Reed	"Human Bay"	Asimov's Science Fiction	
2000	Paul J. McAuley	"Naming the Dead"	Interzone	
2000	Delia Sherman	"The Parwat Ruby"	Fantasy & Science Fiction	
2001	Andy Duncan*	"The Pottawatomie Giant"	Sci Fiction	
2001	Tia V. Travis	"Down Here in the Garden"	Horror Garage	
2001	Kim Newman	"Is There Anybody There?"	The New English Library Book of Internet Stories (New English Library)	
2001	Andy Duncan	"Lincoln in Frogmore"	Beluthahatchie and Other Stories (Golden Gryphon Press)	
2001	Michael Swanwick	"The Raggle Taggle Gypsy-O"	Tales of Old Earth (North Atlantic Books)	
2001	Terry Dowling	"The Saltimbanques"	Blackwater Days (Eidolon Publications)	
2001	Kelly Link	"Shoe and Marriage"	4 Stories (Small Beer Press)	
2002	Albert E. Cowdrey*	"Queen for a Day"	Fantasy & Science Fiction	
2002	James Blaylock	"His Own Back Yard"	Sci Fiction	
2002	Jeffrey Ford	"The Honeyed Knot"	Fantasy & Science Fiction	
2002	Jack O'Connell	"Legerdemain"	Fantasy & Science Fiction	
2002	Nalo Hopkinson	"Something to Hitch Meat To"	Skin Folk (Warner Aspect)	
2003	Jeffrey Ford*	"Creation"	Fantasy & Science Fiction	
2003	William Browning Spencer	"The Essayist in the Wilderness"	Fantasy & Science Fiction	
2003	Stephen Gallagher	"Little Dead Girl Singing"	Weird Tales	
2003	Neil Gaiman	"October in the Chair"	Conjunctions 39: The New Wave Fabulists (Bard College)	
2003	Jeffrey Ford	"The Weight of Words"	Leviathan 3 (The Ministry of Whimsy Press)	
2004	Bruce Holland Rogers*	"Don Ysidro"	Polyphony: Volume 3 (Wheatland Press)	
2004	Maureen F. McHugh	"Ancestor Money"	Sci Fiction	
2004	Charles de Lint	Circle of Cats	Viking Press	
2004	Alexander C. Irvine	"Gus Dreams of Biting the Mailman"	Trampoline (Small Beer Press)	
2004	Chris Roberson	"O One"	Live Without a Net (Roc Books)	
2005	Margo Lanagan*	"Singing My Sister Down"	Black Juice (Allen & Unwin)	
2005	Kelly Link	"The Faery Handbag"	The Faery Reel: Tales from the Twilight Realm (Viking Press)	
2005	Barbara Roden	"Northwest Passage"	Acquainted with the Night (Ash-Tree Press)	
2005	China Miéville	"Reports of Certain Events in London"	McSweeney's Enchanted Chamber of Astonishing Stories (Vintage Books)	
2005	Theodora Goss	"The Wings of Meister Wilhelm"	Polyphony: Volume 4 (Wheatland Press)	
2006	George Saunders*	"CommComm"	The New Yorker	
2006	Joe Hill	"Best New Horror"	Postscripts	
2006	Holly Phillips	"The Other Grace"	In the Palace of Repose (Prime Books)	
2006	Caitlín R. Kiernan	"La Peau Verte"	To Charles Fort, with Love (Subterranean Press)	
2006	Peter S. Beagle	"Two Hearts"	Fantasy & Science Fiction	
2007	M. Rickert*	"Journey Into the Kingdom"	Fantasy & Science Fiction	
2007	Christopher Rowe	"Another Word for Map is Faith"	Fantasy & Science Fiction	
2007	Geoff Ryman	"Pol Pot's Beautiful Daughter (Fantasy)"	Fantasy & Science Fiction	
2007	Benjamin Rosenbaum	"A Siege of Cranes"	Twenty Epics (All-Star Stories)	
2007	Jeffrey Ford	"The Way He Does It"	Electric Velocipede	
2008	Theodora Goss*	"Singing of Mount Abora"	Logorrhea: Good Words Make Good Stories (Bantam Books)	
2008	Daniel Abraham	"The Cambist and Lord Iron: A Fairy Tale of Economics"	Logorrhea: Good Words Make Good Stories (Bantam Books)	
2008	Simon Kurt Unsworth	"The Church on the Island"	At Ease with the Dead (Ash-Tree Press)	
2008	Robert Shearman	"Damned If You Don't"	Tiny Deaths (Comma Press)	
2008	Kij Johnson	"The Evolution of Trickster Stories Among the Dogs of North Park After the Change"	The Coyote Road: Trickster Tales (Viking Press)	
2009	Kij Johnson*	"26 Monkeys, Also the Abyss"	Asimov's Science Fiction	
2009	Catherynne M. Valente	"A Buyer's Guide to Maps of Antarctica"	Clarkesworld Magazine	
2009	Kage Baker	"Caverns of Mystery"	Subterranean: Tales of Dark Fantasy (Subterranean Press)	
2009	Sarah Pinborough	"Our Man in the Sudan"	The Second Humdrumming Book of Horror Stories (Humdrumming)	
2009	John Kessel	"Pride and Prometheus"	Fantasy & Science Fiction	
2010	Karen Joy Fowler*	"The Pelican Bar"	Eclipse Three (Night Shade Books)	
2010	R. B. Russell	"In Hiding"	Putting the Pieces in Place (Ex Occidente Press)	
2010	Helen Keeble	"A Journal of Certain Events of Scientific Interest from the First Survey Voyage of the Southern Waters by HMS Ocelot, As Observed by Professor Thaddeus Boswell, DPhil, MSc, or, A Lullaby"	Strange Horizons	
2010	Genevieve Valentine	"Light on the Water"	Fantasy Magazine	
2010	Paul Park	"The Persistence of Memory, or This Space for Sale"	Postscripts	
2010	Ellen Klages	"Singing on a Star"	Firebirds Soaring (Firebird Books)	
2011	Joyce Carol Oates*	"Fossil-Figures"	Stories: All-New Tales (William Morrow and Company)	
2011	Christopher Fowler	"Beautiful Men"	Visitants: Stories of Fallen Angels and Heavenly Hosts (Ulysses Press)	
2011	Karen Joy Fowler	"Booth's Ghost"	What I Didn't See and Other Stories (Small Beer Press)	
2011	Kij Johnson	"Ponies"	Tor.com	
2011	Mercurio D. Rivera	"Tu Sufrimiento Shall Protect Us"	Black Static	
2012	Ken Liu*	"The Paper Menagerie"	Fantasy & Science Fiction	
2012	Steve Duffy	"X for Demetrious"	Blood and Other Cravings (Tor Books)	
2012	Karen Joy Fowler	"Younger Women"	Subterranean Magazine	
2012	Tim Powers	"A Journey of Only Two Paces"	The Bible Repairman and Other Stories (Tachyon Publications)	
2012	E. Lily Yu	"The Cartographer Wasps and the Anarchist Bees"	Clarkesworld Magazine	
2013	Gregory Norman Bossert*	"The Telling"	Beneath Ceaseless Skies	
2013	Jeffrey Ford	"A Natural History of Autumn"	Fantasy & Science Fiction	
2013	Emily Gilman	"The Castle That Jack Built"	Beneath Ceaseless Skies	
2013	Kat Howard	"Breaking the Frame"	Lightspeed	
2013	Meghan McCarron	"Swift, Brutal Retaliation"	Tor.com	
2014	Caitlín R. Kiernan*	"The Prayer of Ninety Cats"	Subterranean Magazine	
2014	Thomas Olde Heuvelt	"The Ink Readers of Doi Saket"	Tor.com	
2014	Yoon Ha Lee	"Effigy Nights"	Clarkesworld Magazine	
2014	Sofia Samatar	"Selkie Stories Are for Losers"	Strange Horizons	
2014	Rachel Swirsky	"If You Were a Dinosaur, My Love"	Apex Magazine	
2015	Scott Nicolay*	Do You Like to Look at Monsters?	Fedogan & Bremer	
2015	Kaaron Warren	"Death's Door Café"	Shadows & Tall Trees (Undertow Publications)	
2015	Alyssa Wong	"The Fisher Queen"	Fantasy & Science Fiction	
2015	Kelly Link	"I Can See Right Through You"	Timothy McSweeney's Quarterly Concern	
2015	Ursula Vernon	"Jackalope Wives"	Apex Magazine	
2016	Alyssa Wong*	"Hungry Daughters of Starving Mothers"	Nightmare	
2016	Tamsyn Muir	"The Deepwater Bride"	Fantasy & Science Fiction	
2016	Sam J. Miller	"The Heat of Us: Notes Toward an Oral History"	Uncanny Magazine	
2016	Selena Chambers	"The Neurastheniac"	Cassilda's Song (Chaosium)	
2016	Amal El-Mohtar	"Pockets"	Uncanny Magazine	
2017	G. V. Anderson*	"Das Steingeschöpf"	Strange Horizons	
2017	Rachael K. Jones	"The Fall Shall Further the Flight in Me"	Clockwork Phoenix 5 (Mythic Delirium)	
2017	Maria Dahvana Headley	"Little Widow"	Nightmare	
2017	Brooke Bolander	"Our Talons Can Crush Galaxies"	Uncanny Magazine	
2017	Amal El-Mohtar	"Seasons of Glass and Iron"	The Starlit Wood (Saga Press)	
2018	Natalia Theodoridou*	"The Birding: A Fairy Tale"	Strange Horizons	
2018	Fonda Lee	"Old Souls"	Where the Stars Rise: Asian Science Fiction and Fantasy (Laksa Media Groups)	
2018	Rebecca Roanhorse	"Welcome to Your Authentic Indian Experience™"	Apex Magazine	
2018	Fran Wilde	"Clearly Lettered in a Mostly Steady Hand"	Uncanny Magazine	
2018	Caroline M. Yoachim	"Carnival Nine"	Beneath Ceaseless Skies	
2019	Emma Törzs*	"Like a River Loves the Sky"	Uncanny Magazine	
2019	Mel Kassel*	"Ten Deals with the Indigo Snake"	Lightspeed	
2019	Sarah Pinsker	"The Court Magician"	Lightspeed	
2019	Adam-Troy Castro	"The Ten Things She Said While Dying: An Annotation"	Nightmare	
2019	Alix E. Harrow	"A Witch's Guide to Escape: A Practical Compendium of Portal Fantasties"	Apex Magazine	
2020	Maria Dahvana Headley*	"Read After Burning"	A People's Future of the United States (One World)	
2020	Rivers Solomon	"Blood Is Another Word for Hunger"	Tor.com	
2020	Sarah Pinsker	"The Blur in the Corner of Your Eye"	Uncanny Magazine	
2020	Genevieve Valentine	"Everyone Knows That They're Dead. Do You?"	The Outcast Hours (Solaris Books)	
2020	Siobhan Carroll	"For He Can Creep"	Tor.com	
2020	Jerome Stueart	"Postlude to the Afternoon of a Faun"	Fantasy & Science Fiction	
2021	Celeste Rita Baker*	"Glass Bottle Dancer"	Lightspeed	
2021	Eugenia Triantafyllou	"My Country Is a Ghost"	Uncanny Magazine	
2021	Jordan Taylor	"The Nine Scents of Sorrow"	Uncanny Magazine	
2021	John Wiswell	"Open House on Haunted Hill"	Diabolical Plots	
2021	Kay Chronister	"The Women Who Sing for Sklep"	Thin Places (Undertow Publications)	
2022	Lauren Ring*	"(emet)"	Fantasy & Science Fiction	
2022	Usman T. Malik	"#Spring Love, #Pichal Pairi"	Tor.com	
2022	Varsha Dinesh	"The Demon Sage's Daughter"	Strange Horizons	
2022	Eugen Bacon	"The Failing Name"	Fantasy Magazine	
2022	Seb Doubinsky	"The Failing Name"	Fantasy Magazine	
2022	P. Djèlí Clark	"If the Martians Have Magic"	Uncanny Magazine	
2022	Sarah Pinsker	"Where Oaken Hearts Do Gather"	Uncanny Magazine	
2023	Tananarive Due*	"Incident at Bear Creek Lodge"	Other Terrors: An Inclusive Anthology (William Morrow Paperbacks)	
2023	Eugen Bacon	"The Devil Don't Come with Horns"	Other Terrors: An Inclusive Anthology (William Morrow Paperbacks)	
2023	Suzan Palumbo	"Douen"	The Dark	
2023	Kate Heartfield	"The Morning House"	PodCastle	
2023	Kat Howard	"Telling the Bees"	Sunday Morning Transport	
2024	Nghi Vo*	"Silk and Cotton and Linen and Blood"	New Suns 2 (Solaris Books)	
2024	P. Djèlí Clark	"How to Raise a Kraken in Your Bathtub"	Uncanny Magazine	
2024	Amal El-Mohtar	"John Hollowback and the Witch"	The Book of Witches (Harper Voyager)	
2024	P. A. Cornell	"Once Upon a Time at The Oakmont"	Fantasy Magazine	
2024	Rachael K. Jones	"The Sound of Children Screaming"	Nightmare	
2024	A. T. Greenblatt	"Waystation City"	Uncanny Magazine	
2025	Maura McHugh*	"Raptor"	Heartwood: A Mythago Wood Anthology	
2025	Hiron Ennes	"Our Best Selves"	Weird Horror	
2025	CL Hellisen	"Godskin"	Strange Horizons	
2025	PH Lee	"The V*mpire"	Reactor	
2025	Hannah Yang	"Everything in the Garden is Lovely"	Apex Magazine	
2026	Renan Bernardo*	"The Hungry Mouth at the Edge of Space and the Goddess Knitting at Home"	Reactor	
2026	Thomas Ha	"In My Country"	Clarkesworld Magazine	
2026	Samantha Mills	"10 Visions of the Future; or, Self-Care for the End of Days"	Uncanny Magazine	
2026	Jocelyn Szczepaniak-Gillece	"St. Dymphna's School for Borderland Girls"	Weird Horror	
2026	Caroline M. Yoachim	"Unfinished Architectures of the Human-Fae War"	Uncanny Magazine	
