= The Sound of Children Screaming =

2023 short story by Rachael K. Jones

"The Sound of Children Screaming" is a 2023 fantasy/horror short story by Rachael K. Jones. It was first published in Nightmare.

== Synopsis ==
During a school shooting, fourth-grade teacher Michelle Dalton and eight of her students find themselves in a magical world — which may be more dangerous than the one they just fled.

== Reception ==
"The Sound of Children Screaming" was a finalist for the Nebula Award for Best Short Story in 2023, the 2024 Hugo Award for Best Short Story, the 2024 World Fantasy Award—Short Fiction, and the 2023 Bram Stoker Award for Short Fiction. It was included on Locus's recommended reading list for 2023.

Tangent Online called it "scary and thought-provoking" and "definitely worth reading". A. C. Wise considered it to be one of the top ten stories of 2023.
