= Rachael K. Jones =

American author

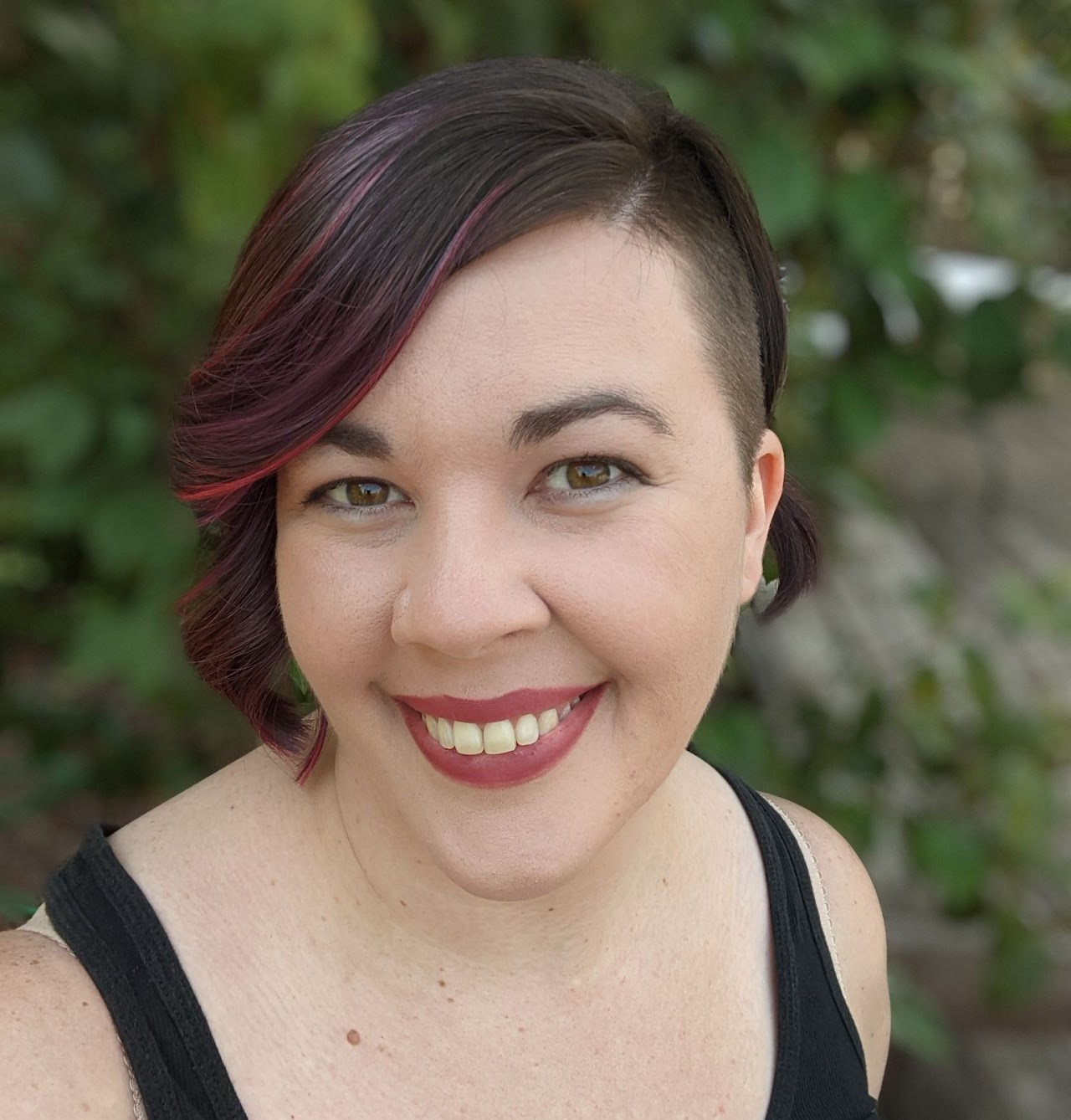
- Jones in 2020
- Occupation: Writer/Speech language pathologist
- Writing career
- Period: 2013-present
- Genre: Speculative fiction
- Website: www.rachaelkjones.com

Rachael K. Jones is an American writer and editor of speculative fiction. Several of her stories have been nominated for the genre's highest awards.

== Biography ==
Jones currently works as a speech-language pathologist, working with special education children with communication disorders. She has degrees in English and Speech-Language Pathology. A former resident of Athens, Georgia, along with her husband Jason, she currently lives in Beaverton, Oregon.

== Writing career ==
First published in 2013, Jones has written dozens of speculative fiction short stories. In one of her 2015 short stories, "Traveling Mercies", a traveler is invited into the homes of his friends while on a journey from home. The traveler is left ambiguous but is inspired by themes from folktales. Another 2015 short story, "The Law of the Conservation of Hair", was written as a series of resolutions and told of First Contact and partnership in relationship.

Jones edited (with Graeme Dunlop) PodCastle - The Fantasy Fiction Podcast from April 2015 to April 2016. She was also the submissions editor for Escape Pod.

In 2018, Jones released her debut novella, Every River Runs to Salt. It follows Quietly, a college student in Athens, Georgia, after her roommate and crush, Imani, has stolen the Pacific Ocean and hidden it belowground in the Under-Ath. Visited and cursed by the personifications of Washington, Oregon, and California, Imani eventually collapses. Quietly journeys to help her. Amal El-Mohtar, reviewing for The New York Times, praised it as "a beautiful story of friendship, love and katabasis" noting its sense of place, quality of prose, strong characterization, and busy ending. Molly Katz, for Strange Horizons, called it a "uniquely and beautifully told story" and appreciated its dry humor, attention to place, and themes while wishing for a fuller characterization of the world.

Jones' Eugie Award-winning story, "The Sound of Children Screaming", published in the October 2023 issue of Nightmare, drew inspiration from a lockdown event that happened after hours at her school. The title is derived from a caption accompanying a news video of the Uvalde school shooting reading, "the sound of children screaming has been removed." The story follows a group of children escaping a school shooting via a magical exit that contains its own dangers. Paula Guran, reviewing for Locus, said that the story was thought-provoking: the topic was difficult and "Jones uses considerable imagination" in tackling it.

In another 2023 short story, "Seven Ways to Find Yourself at the Transdimensional Multifandom Convention", Chris-P and You meet at an annual convention and trade stories of how the other might have lived. Charles Payseur, reviewing for Locus, labeled it a "moving and bittersweet" story about alternate versions of a life. In another short story, "How My Sister Talked Me Into Necromancy During Quarantine", Becca and Lila tackle pandemic-induced boredom by summoning the undead for chores. Reactor recommended the piece as a funny work of speculative fiction.

In January 2024, Jones published "Five Views of the Planet Tartarus" in Lightspeed. According to Jones, it began as a piece she wrote years earlier as part of a flash fiction challenge. Upon rediscovering the draft, she was able to reformat the story and compose an ending. "Five Views of the Planet Tartarus" was nominated for the Hugo, Nebula, and Locus awards for short story.

== Bibliography (long form) ==
- Every River Runs to Salt (Fireside Fiction Company, 2018)

== Awards ==
| Year | Title | Award | Category | Result | Ref |
|---|---|---|---|---|---|
| 2016 | "Dinosaur Dreams in Infinite Measure" | Writers Of The Future | 1st Quarter | 2nd place | |
| 2017 | "The Fall Shall Further the Flight in Me" | World Fantasy Award | World Fantasy Award—Short Fiction | Shortlisted | |
| 2017 | "The Night Bazaar for Women Becoming Reptiles" | Otherwise Award | Honor list | Nominated | |
| 2019 | Sword and Sonnet (with Aidan Doyle and E. Catherine Tobler) | World Fantasy Award | World Fantasy Award—Anthology | Nominated | |
| 2023 | "The Sound of Children Screaming" | Bram Stoker Award | Best Short Fiction | Shortlisted | |
| 2023 | "The Sound of Children Screaming" | Eugie Award | | Won | |
| 2023 | "The Sound of Children Screaming" | Hugo Award | Best Short Story | Shortlisted | |
| 2023 | "The Sound of Children Screaming" | Nebula Award | Best Short Story | Shortlisted | |
| 2024 | "The Sound of Children Screaming" | Locus Award | Best Short Story | Shortlisted | |
| 2024 | "Five Views of the Planet Tartarus" | Hugo Award | Best Short Story | Shortlisted | |
| 2024 | "Five Views of the Planet Tartarus" | Nebula Award | Best Short Story | Shortlisted | |
| 2025 | "Five Views of the Planet Tartarus" | Locus Award | Best Short Story | Shortlisted | |
