= Aimee Ogden =

American author

- Born: June 1983 (age 43); Michigan, U.S.
- Occupations: Author, editor, poet
- Writing career
- Language: English
- Period: 2014–present
- Genre: Speculative fiction
- Notable awards: Jim Baen Memorial Short Story Award (2016)
- Website: aimeeogdenwrites.com

Aimee Ogden (born June 1983) is an American author of speculative fiction, editor, and poet. active in the field since 2014. She writes as Aimee Ogden, except in two instances when she was erroneously bylined as Aimee Odgen.

== Early life and education ==
Aimee Ogden was born Aimee Beth Sutherland in a suburb north of Detroit, Michigan, where she was also raised. She attended Michigan State University, earning a BS in zoology. Ogden later enrolled in a PhD program in cell biology at the University of Wisconsin-Madison, which she left before completing. Afterwards, she earned a teaching certificate and worked as a high school science teacher in rural parts of Wisconsin.

== Career ==
She co-founded and co-publishes, and formerly co-edited the semiprofessional speculative fiction magazine Translunar Travelers Lounge, which she edited with Bennett North from 2019-2024. Just prior to the COVID epidemic she also worked briefly as a trainer at the YMCA. She also worked at various times as a software tester and a laboratory assistant.

Ogden read some work by Neil Gaiman and Ray Bradbury early in life, but only took a serious interest in speculative fiction when she participated in the MSU chapter of the Genre Evolution Project, studying trends in SFF short fiction. It exposed her to the works of Connie Willis, Harlan Ellison, Ursula K. Le Guin, and Ted Chiang, among other authors. Current authors whose work Ogden finds intriguing or inspirational include Amal Singh, B. Pladek, Ben Hatke, Nghi Vo, Yoon Ha Lee, Louis Evans, Vanessa Fogg, Kelly Barnhill, and C. L. Polk.

She attributes her ability to write and publish as much as she has to her spouse providing most of her family's financial support, as well as a stubborn persistence in submitting her work to publishers. She has published a large body of short fiction and verse in numerous publications, including the periodicals Analog Science Fiction and Fact, Apex Magazine, Apparition Literary Magazine, Asimov's Science Fiction, Augur, Baffling Magazine, Beneath Ceaseless Skies, Cast of Wonders, Clarkesworld, The Colored Lens, Cossmass Infinities, Daily Science Fiction, The Dark, Deep Magic, Diabolical Plots, The Dread Machine, Escape Pod, Factor Four Magazine, Fantasy Magazine, Fantasy Podcast, Fireside Quarterly, Fireside Magazine, Flash Fiction Online, The Future Fire, Futures, Giganotosaurus, GlitterShip, Helios Quarterly, Kaleidotrope, Lightspeed, Luna Station Quarterly, The Magazine of Fantasy & Science Fiction, Nightmare Magazine, Orion's Belt, PodCastle, Psychopomp, Shimmer, Syntax & Salt, Small Wonders, The Sockdolager, Star*Line, StarShipSofa, Strange Horizons, Toasted Cake, Translunar Travelers Lounge, Trollbreath Magazine, Weird Horror, and Zooscape, and the anthologies Baen Books: Free Stories 2016, Behind the Mask: An Anthology of Heroic Proportions, The Best American Science Fiction and Fantasy 2022, The Best of Deep Magic: Anthology One, Broad Knowledge: 35 Women Up to No Good, Climbing Lightly Through Forests: A Poetry Anthology Honoring Ursula K. Le Guin, Deep Magic: Volume I, Diabolical Plots: Year Three, Diabolical Plots: Year Four, Epic Fantasy Short Stories, Event Horizon 2017, Event Horizon 2018, Fell Beasts and Fair, Frozen Fairy Tales, GlitterShip Year Two, Hidden Menagerie: A Cryptid Anthology: Vol. 2, Hidden Realms Short Stories, If There's Anyone Left: Volume 1, If There's Anyone Left: Volume 2, If This Goes On, The Internet Is Where the Robots Live Now, It Gets Even Better: Stories of Queer Possibility, The Jim Baen Memorial Award: The First Decade, The Long List Anthology: Volume 6, The Long List Anthology: Volume 8, Nebula Awards Showcase 60, Orion's Belt Year-End Anthology 2023, Orson Scott Card's Intergalactic Medicine Show, Pioneers & Pathfinders, The Reinvented Heart, Shimmer 2017: The Collected Stories, Stories for the Thoughtful Young, The 2015 Rhysling Anthology, 2021 Debut Sampler, 2024 Hugo Voter Packet, The Year's Best Dark Fantasy and Horror: Volume 1, and Zooscape: Volume 4: Issues 11-13.

== Personal life ==
She married Andrew Graham Ogden in 2006. She left the workforce after giving birth to twins.

In the early 2020s, Ogden's family moved to the Netherlands for her spouse's work; as of 2023 they resided near Randstad. Ogden's hobbies include cross-stitching, cooking, baking, weight lifting, running, and ultimate frisbee.

== Awards and nominations ==
Ogden's works have won or been considered for a number of literary awards.

- "Morning Sickness" was a preliminary nominee for the 2015 Rhysling Award for Short Poem.
- "Dear Ammi" won the 2016 Jim Baen Memorial Short Story Award.
- "Blood, Bone, Seed, Spark" was a nominee for the 2020 Hugo Award for Best Novelette, and "The Cold Calculations" was a nominee for the 2022 Hugo Award for Best Short Story.
- "Never a Butterfly, Nor a Moth with Moon-Painted Wings" placed 36th for the 2021 Locus Award for Best Short Story, and "Nothing of Value" placed 30th for the 2025 Locus Award in the same category.
- "A Flower Cannot Love the Hand" was nominated for the 2022 Eugie Foster Memorial Award for Short Fiction.
- Sun-Daughters, Sea-Daughters was nominated for the 2022 Nebula Award for Best Novella, and "What Any Dead Thing Wants" was nominated for the 2024 Nebula Award for Best Novelette.
- "Because I Held His Name Like a Key" was a finalist for the 2026 Ignyte Award for Outstanding Short Story.

== Bibliography ==
=== Novellas ===
- Sun-Daughters, Sea-Daughters, Interstellar Flight Press, (2021)
- Local Star, Tor.com, (2021)
- A Half-Remembered World, Fantasy & Science Fiction, (July 2023)
- Emergent Properties, Tor.com (2023)
- Starstruck, Psychopomp (2025)

=== Short fiction ===
- "The Light of the Moon, the Strength of the Storm, the Warmth of the Sun" (2015)
- "Dear Ammi" (2016)
- "Tomorrow's World" (2016)
- "A Way with Words" (2016)
- "Two Queens of the River" (2016)
- "To Touch the Sun Before It Fades" (2016)
- "Good Night Moon, Good Night Air, Good Night Noises Everywhere" (2017)
- "The Cold, Lonely Waters" (2017)
- "As I Fall Asleep" (2017)
- "Elena's Angel" (2017)
- "The Forty Gardens of Calliope Grey" (2017)
- "Fire Rode the Cold Wind" (2017)
- "What He Offered the River" (2017)
- "The Pond" (2017)
- "Seb Dreams of Reincarnation" (2017)
- "When One Door Shuts" (2017)
- "Three Cats at the End of the World" (2017)
- "Of All Stars, the Most Beautiful" (2018)
- "Time Piece and the Perfect Daughter" (2018)
- "Dances with Snoglafanians" (2018)
- "Six Rocketeers by Starlight" (2018)
- "Boirdeleau, WI (Population 3,017)" (2018)
- "A Cruelty That Cut Both Ways" (2018)
- "A World Without" (2018)
- "The Steam-Powered Princess" (2018)
- "The Nine Bajillion and One Names of God" (2018)
- "Heaven for Everyone" (2018)
- "Your Words There for the World to See" (2018)
- "Matched Set" (2018)
- "Lulu's Friends" (2019)
- "In September" (2019)
- "Blood, Bone, Seed, Spark" (2019)
- "Twelve Histories Scrawled in the Sky" (2019)
- "To Dine in the Court of Beasts and Birds" (2019)
- "His Heart Is the Haunted House" (2019)
- "Lights That Shine" (2019)
- "Shelter, Sustenance, Self" (2019)
- "A Song for the Leadwood Tree" (2019)
- "Venti Mocchaccino, No Whip, Double Shot of Magic" (2019)
- "Au Ciel Monte" (2019)
- "The Quarantine Nursery" (2019)
- "No Duty Farther Than Her Own Heartbeat" (2020)
- "Excerpt from the Collected Memoirs of Dr. Enid Farley-Wright: An Excursion to Cambridge Kinetozoological Park, June 12, 1914" (2020)
- "Never a Butterfly, Nor a Moth with Moon-Painted Wings"" (2020)
- "This City Of Spilt Marrow And Silence"" (2020) [only as by Aimee Odgen]
- "To Persist, However Changed" (2020)
- "First Morning on Mars" (2020)
- "Buttercream and Broken Wings" (2020)
- "Seven Letters" (2020)
- "A Skyful of Wings" (2020)
- "Psalms" (2020)
- "More Than Simple Steel" (2020)
- "The Goblin Knight" (2020)
- "Two Offerings in the Halls of Undying" (2020)
- "It Is a Beautiful Day on the Internet, and You Are a Horrible Bot" (2020)
- "Intentionalities" (2021)
- "One Last Broken Thing" (2021)
- "Thh*sh*thhh" (2021)
- "Deadlock" (2021)
- "Queen Minnie's Last Ride" (2021)
- "Sun-Daughters, Sea-Daughters" (excerpt) (2021)
- "Him Without Her and Her Within Him" (2021)
- "A Flower Cannot Love the Hand" (2021)
- "City-Above, City-Below" (2021)
- "The Songs Her Mother Used to Sing" (2021)
- "A Recipe for Trouble" (2021)
- "Like Blood for Ink" (2021)
- "Venti Mochaccino, No Whip, Double Shot of Magic" (2021)
- "A Luxury Like Hope" (2021)
- "Hundreds of Little Absences" (2021)
- "The Antithesis of Virtue" (2021)
- "The Cold Calculations" (2021)
- "Top Ten Things to See Before the World Burns" (2021)
- "A Gentlemen's Agreement" (2022)
- "Dissent: A Five-Course Meal (with Suggested Pairings)" (2022)
- "A Beginner's Guide to Jailbreaking Your myToast3000™" (2022)
- "The Lucky Ones" (2022)
- "No Pain but That of Memory" (2022)
- "Still No God of Mine" (2022)
- "The Universe Ends on a Tuesday" (2022)
- "The Mountains of Another World, Where Eagles May Fly Free" (2022)
- "Company Town" (2022)
- "The Mountain's Poison Is Sweetness, Too" (2022)
- "Everyone Then Who Hears These Words" (2022)
- "Stubbornness and Sisters and Spite" (2022)
- "Memories in the Kitchen" (2022)
- "Accountability, and Other Myths of Old Earth" (2022)
- "SOC 301: Apian Gender Studies (Cross-Listed with ZOL 301)" (2022)
- "A Map of What Comes Next" (2022)
- "Mad Honey" (2022)
- "A Love Letter Written at the Heat Death of the Universe" (2022)
- "Prix Fixe Menu" (2023)
- "Every Little Change" (2023)
- "Moments of Doubt" (2023)
- "Her Suffering, Pretty and Private" (2023)
- "Long Enough for a Cup of Tea" (2023)
- "A Half-Remembered World" (2023)
- "On the Day Mish Goes to Heaven" (2023)
- "But First It Is Sung" (2023)
- "Bread-Daughter, Beer-Daughter" (2023)
- "On the Day When She Can Run No More" (2023)
- "Patience Is the Virtue" (2024)
- "Night Desk Duty at the Infinite Paradox Hotel" (2024)
- "Nothing of Value" (2024)
- "What Any Dead Thing Wants" (2024)
- "More and Less and New" (2024)
- "A Series of Accounts Surrounding the Risen Lady of the Orun-Alai and Other Alleged Miracles in the *"Final Days of the Riverlands War" (2024)
- "Ingénue, Once" (2024)
- "The Oracular Manifestation of Human Consciousness Offers Three Provocative Verbs Separated by Commas" (2024)
- "Because I Held His Name Like a Key" (2025)
- "La Forêt de Fontainebleu, Les Chausseurs, Le Renard" (2025)
- "The Nature of Spells, the Nature of Children" (2025)
- "The Versions of Yourself That You're Better Off Without" (2025)
- "You Always Told Her You'd Give Her the World" (2025)
- "A Simulacrum of Self" (2026)
- "Hollow in the Hope" (2026)

=== Verse ===
- "Morning Sickness" (2014)
- "Newton's First Law" (2015)
- "The Cut Worm Forgives the Plow" (2016)
- "The Dragon" (2016)
- "On the Long Road Back" (2021)
- "The Ghosts of You Persist" (2024)
- "Entropy Brooks No Countercurrent" (2024)
