= Alyssa Wong =

American writer

- Born: Surprise, Arizona, U.S.
- Occupation: Author
- Writing career
- Genre: Speculative fiction
- Website: www.crashwong.net

Alyssa Wong is an American writer of speculative fiction, comics, poetry, and games. They are a recipient of the Nebula Award, World Fantasy Award, and Locus Award.

Wong studied fiction at North Carolina State University, graduating in 2017 with a Master of Fine Arts. In July 2018, they were hired by Blizzard Entertainment as a writer on Overwatch. Wong is the writer for Marvel Comics's Star Wars: Doctor Aphra comic series that began in 2020, the 2022 Deadpool and Iron Fist series, as well as the Alligator Loki webtoon series on Marvel Unlimited, and Psylocke (since 2024).

== Personal life ==
Wong is queer and non-binary and uses they/them pronouns.

== Bibliography ==
=== Novels ===
- The High Republic: Escape from Valo (2024)

=== Chapbooks ===
- A Fist of Permutations in Lightning and Wildflowers (2016)

=== Short fiction ===
- "The Fisher Queen" (2014)
- "Scarecrow" (2014)
- "Santos de Sampaguitas" (2014)
- "Hungry Daughters of Starving Mothers" (2015)
- "A Fist of Permutations in Lightning and Wildflowers" (2016)
- "You'll Surely Drown Here If You Stay" (2016)
- "Rabbit Heart" (2016)
- "Natural Skin" (2016)
- "The White Dragon" (2016)
- "Your Bones Will Not Be Unknown" (2016)
- "God Product" (2017)
- "A Clamor of Bones" (2017)
- "All the Time We've Left to Spend" (2018)
- "What My Mother Left Me" (2018)
- "Olivia's Table" (2018)
- "What You Left Behind" (2019)
- "Wolf Trap", From a Certain Point of View: Return of the Jedi, (Del Rey, August 2023)

=== Poems ===
- "For the Gardener's Daughter" (2015)

=== Essays ===
- "Here's How It Goes" (2015)
- "Buzzword" (2016)
- "The H Word: The Darkest, Truest Mirrors" (2016)
- "They Love Me Not: How Fictional Villains Saved My Life" (2016)

=== Comics ===
==== DC ====
- DC The Doomed and the Damned #1 (with Travis G. Moore, Saladin Ahmed, Marv Wolfman, John Arcudi, Kenny Porter, Amanda Deibert, Garth Ennis, Amedeo Turturro, and Brandon Thomas, 2020)
- Sensational Wonder Woman #6 (2021)
- Lazarus Planet: Dark Fate #1 (with Tim Seeley, Dennis Culver and A.L. Kaplan, 2022)
- Spirit World #1–6 (2023)

==== Marvel ====
- Aero #2-6 (2019)
- Alligator Loki #1–48 (with Bob Quinn, 2022–present)
- Captain Marvel (vol. 11) #1–10 (2023-2024)
- Carnage: Black, White & Blood #3 (with Karla Pacheco and Dan Slott, 2021)
- Deadpool (vol. 8) #1–10 (2022–2023)
- Future Fight Firsts:
  - White Fox one-shot (2019)
  - Luna Snow one-shot (2019)
  - Crescent and Io one-shot (2019)
- Iron Fist:
  - Iron Fist (vol. 6) #1–5 (2022)
  - A.X.E.: Iron Fist #1 (2022)
  - Iron Fist 50th Anniversary Special #1, "Iron Fisticuffs" (2024)
- Psylocke (vol. 2) #1–10 (2024–2025)
- Shang-Chi:
  - The Legend of Shang-Chi #1 (2021)
  - Shang-Chi Infinity Comic (with Nathan Stockman, 2021)
- Star Wars:
  - Star Wars: Doctor Aphra #1–40 (2020–2024)
  - Star Wars: War of the Bounty Hunters – Boushh #1 (2021)

== Awards ==
- 2014 Nebula Award for Best Short Story (finalist), 2014 Shirley Jackson Award (finalist), 2015 World Fantasy Award for Best Short Story (finalist), for "The Fisher Queen".
- 2015 Nebula Award for Best Short Story (winner), 2016 World Fantasy Award for Best Short Story (winner), 2015 Shirley Jackson Award (finalist), 2016 Locus Award for Best Short Story (finalist), 2015 Bram Stoker Award for Short Fiction, for "Hungry Daughters of Starving Mothers".
- 2016 John W. Campbell Award for Best New Writer (finalist) (As well, an analysis by Io9 indicated that, if not for the Sad Puppies ballot manipulation campaign, Wong would have also been a finalist for the 2015 award.)
- 2017 Locus Award for Best Novelette (winner), 2016 Nebula Award for Best Novelette (finalist), 2017 Hugo Award for Best Novelette (finalist) for "You'll Surely Drown Here If You Stay".
- 2017 Locus Award for Best Short Story (finalist), 2016 Nebula Award for Best Short Story (finalist), 2017 Hugo Award for Best Short Story (finalist) for "A Fist of Permutations in Lightning and Wildflowers".

Awards
Preceded by Scott Nicolay	World Fantasy Award—Short Fiction winner 2016	Succeeded by G. V. Anderson
