= Belsen Express =

1975 horror fiction short story by Fritz Leiber

"Belsen Express" is a 1975 horror fiction short story, by Fritz Leiber. It first appeared in his collection The Second Book of Fritz Leiber.

== Synopsis ==
George Simister is a racist bigot, but also has a fear of Nazis. As he commutes to work each day, he begins to notice that his journey is apparently recapitulating elements of the Holocaust, including a destination sign which he thinks says "Belsen". After traveling in an uncomfortably full bus permeated by exhaust fumes, he arrives at his office, where he dies of what one doctor believes to be carbon monoxide poisoning.

== Reception ==
"Belsen Express" won the 1976 World Fantasy Award—Short Fiction and the August Derleth Award for short fiction.

SF Signal called it "spooky stuff", rating it three stars out of five.
