= The Secret Lives of the Nine Negro Teeth of George Washington =

Short story by P. Djèlí Clark

"The Secret Lives of the Nine Negro Teeth of George Washington" is a fantasy short story by P. Djèlí Clark, about George Washington's teeth. It was first published in Fireside Fiction in 2018.

== Synopsis ==
Rather than being a single narrative, the story examines the lives of the nine enslaved people whose teeth were taken to produce dentures for George Washington — in a world where magic and sorcery are real.

== Reception ==
Locus noted that the story "defeats (the) idea that there might be 'one true' slave narrative, that slaves would have all been this way or that way", and observed that the story is "deeply inform(ed)" by Clark's training as a historian.

Year	Award	Category	Result	Ref.
2018	Nebula Award	Short Story	Won	
2019	Hugo Award	Short Story	Finalist	
2019	Locus Award	Short Story	Won	
2019	Theodore Sturgeon Award	—	Shortlisted	
