= Sooner or Later Everything Falls into the Sea =

Short story collection by Sarah Pinsker

- Author: Sarah Pinsker
- Language: English
- Genre: Speculative fiction
- Publisher: Small Beer Press
- Publication date: March 19, 2019
- Publication place: United States
- Pages: 304
- Award: Philip K. Dick Award
- ISBN: 978-1-61873-155-5

Sooner or Later Everything Falls into the Sea is a 2019 short story collection by Sarah Pinsker. It includes thirteen stories, each incorporating elements of speculative fiction, most notably science fiction and fantasy.

== Contents ==
- "A Stretch of Highway Two Lanes Wide"
- "And We Were Left Darkling" (originally published in Lightspeed, 2015)
- "Remembery Day"
- "Sooner or Later Everything Falls into the Sea" (originally published in Lightspeed, 2016)
- "The Low Hum of Her"
- "Talking with Dead People"
- "The Sewell Home for the Temporally Displaced"
- "In Joy, Knowing the Abyss Behind" (originally published in Strange Horizons, 2013)
- "No Lonely Seafarer" (originally published in Lightspeed, 2014)
- "Wind Will Rove"
- "Our Lady of the Open Road"
- "The Narwhal"
- "And Then There Were (N-One)" (originally published in Uncanny Magazine, 2017)

== Themes ==
Several critics noted the atmosphere of loss, nostalgia, music and reinvention throughout the collection. Gary K. Wolfe, in a review for Locus, wrote that memory "may be [Pinsker's] characteristic theme". Publishers Weekly wrote that "In all of Pinsker’s tales, humans grapple with their relationships to technology, the supernatural, and one another." Michelle Anne Schingler of Foreword Reviews observed that yearning was integral to many of the stories in the collection.

Many of the protagonists of the stories in some way rebel against or break the norms of their society. Many stories feature characters whose communities have been displaced in some way, and the impact of social and technological change on culture is a recurring theme. Kirkus Reviews wrote that "Pinsker’s characters are often loners dedicated to idiosyncratic artistic pursuits".

The collection also prominently features LGBT characters, and many of its themes tie into gender and sexuality. Alexander Carrigan of Lambda Literary noted that "Pinsker presents characters who are all over the LGBT+ spectrum, and in many cases, it allows for further reading and exploration of each story’s themes and characters."

== Reception ==
The collection received starred reviews in Publishers Weekly, Foreword Reviews, and Booklist.

The collection appeared on lists of the best books of 2019 by the Milwaukee Journal Sentinel, Fantasy & Science Fiction, and BuzzFeed.

Awards and Honors
Year	Award	Result	Ref.
2020	Philip K. Dick Award	Won	
2020	World Fantasy Award—Collection	Finalist	
