= Jim Baen Memorial Short Story Award =

Literary award for science fiction short stories

'The Jim Baen Memorial Short Story Award, established in 2007, is an annual literary award for science fiction short stories presented by the National Space Society and Baen Books. Recognizing "the role that science fiction plays in advancing real science", the award is presented to "original stories celebrating optimistic, near-future space exploration." In 2024, multi-time contest winner C. Stuart Hardwick took over the contest's directorship from William Ledbetter after 17 years at the helm.

The award honors American science fiction publisher and editor Jim Baen (1943–2006).

== Recipients ==
Jim Baen Memorial Short Story Award winners
Year	Author	Story	Result	Ref.
2007	Mjke Wood	"Better Sense of Direction"	1	
2007	Robert Billing	"Anniversary"	2	
2007	Michael A. McPherson	"Acclimatization"	3	
2008	David Walton	"Letting Go"	1	
2008	Darwin Garrison	"Skipping Stones"	2	
2008	Charlie Allery	"Self Defense"	3	
2009	Michael Barretta	"Cathedral"	1	
2009	Patrick Lundrigan	"Burst Mode"	2	
2009	Graham Storrs	"All The Way"	3	
2010	Patrick Lundrigan	"Space Hero"	1	
2010	David D. Levine	"Citizen-Astronaut"	2	
2010	Stuart D. Gibbon	"High Ground"	3	
2011	Nancy Fulda	"That Undiscovered Country"	1	
2011	Brad Torgersen	"Gemini XVII"	2	
2011	Michael Simon	"Natural Selection"	3	
2012	R. P. L. Johnson	"Taking the High Road"	1	
2012	Martin L. Shoemaker	"Scramble"	2	
2012	James Wymore	"One Cog"	3	
2013	Patrick O'Sullivan	"The Lamplighter Legacy"	1	
2013	Ronald D. Ferguson	"Intent to Occupy"	2	
2013	Sean Monaghan	"Improvising at Branson Six"	3	
2014	Sean Monaghan	"Low Arc"	1	
2014	Marina J. Lostetter	"Balance"	2	
2014	Angus McIntyre	"Wind Shear"	3	
2015	K. B. Rylander	"We Fly"	1	
2015	Jamie Lackey	"A Metal Box Floating Between the Stars"	2	
2015	Robert Dawson	"Boomerang Zone"	3	
2016	Aimee Ogden	"Dear Ammi"	1	
2016	Jennifer Brozek	"To Lose the Stars"	2	
2016	Ronald D. Ferguson	"Cylinders"	3	
2017	Philip A. Kramer	"Feldspar"	1	
2017	Stephen Lawson	"Bullet Catch"	2	
2017	M. T. Reiten	"An Economy of Air"	3	
2018	Stephen Lawson	"Homunculus"	1	
2018	C. Stuart Hardwick	"Dangerous Company"	2	
2018	Wendy Nikel	"Falling to the Moon"	3	
2019	Matt McHugh	"Burners"	1	
2019	Gustavo Bondoni	"Acid Test"	2	
2019	M. T. Reiten	"Dangerous Orbit"	3	
2020	M. T. Reiten	"Bagala Devi Objective"	1	
2020	Kate MacEachern	"Spinners"	2	
2020	C. Stuart Hardwick	"Sample Return"	3	
2021	Scott Huggins	"Salvage Judgement"	1	
2021	C. Stuart Hardwick	"Reaction Time"	2	
2021	Kurt Pankau	"Love On The Ganymede Trail"	3	
2021	Gustavo Bondoni	"Samba do Espaço"	3	
2022	Elaine Midcoh	"Man on the Moon"	1	
2022	Pierre-Alexandre Sicart	"A New Life"	2	
2022	Harry Lang	"The Rocketship of Her Dreams"	3	
2023	Brad Zeiger	"The Insomniac"	1	
2023	Avery Parks	"High Risk"	2	
2023	J. M. Eno	"Cronus"	3	
2024	Zack Be	"Locus of Control"	1	
2024	Trent Guillory	"Extraction"	2	
2024	William Paul Jones	"Saving Gallivander"	3	
