= The Haunting of Tram Car 015 =

2019 novella by P. Djèlí Clark

- Author: P. Djèlí Clark
- Language: English
- Series: Dead Djinn Universe
- Genre: Fantasy; steampunk
- Publisher: Tordotcom
- Publication date: 19 Feb 2019
- Publication place: United States
- Pages: 144
- ISBN: 9781250294807
- Preceded by: A Dead Djinn in Cairo
- Followed by: A Master of Djinn

The Haunting of Tram Car 015 is an alternate history science fantasy police procedural novella by American novelist P. Djèlí Clark. It was first published by Tor.com in 2019.

== Synopsis ==
In 1912, three decades after the resurgence of magic allowed Egypt to evict the European colonial powers, agents Hamed Nasr and Onsi Youssef of the Ministry of Alchemy, Enchantments, and Supernatural Entities are tasked with removing a malevolent supernatural entity from an aerial tram car; meanwhile, Egypt's women are demanding the right to vote.

== Reception ==
At NPR, Amal el-Mohtar extolled it as "a zippy, wonderful romp", lauding Clark's portrayal of "a successfully decolonized Middle-East and North Africa", and his use of "Arabic words where they should be in a sentence to denote emphasis without straying into empty exotic flourish".

In Locus, Liz Bourke considered it "deeply enjoyable" and "fast-paced, elegantly structured, and with an eye for the ridiculous", with Hamed being an "engaging and compelling" character; Bourke further commended Clark's worldbuilding, and emphasized that the Egyptian feminist movement "crosses class and religious divides".

At Strange Horizons, Foz Meadows described the story's theme as "social change: not just along a single axis, but many", and observed that Clark uses the misogyny inherent in the concept of the al "both for thematic resonance and to give greater depth to his worldbuilding, all while asking questions about real myths and stories".

Cheryl Morgan found it to be a "fun adventure" and a "fascinating glimpse of a sophisticated Egyptian society", and noted the presence of the "Mahdist Revolutionary People's Republic". James Nicoll stated that the plotting and characters were both "nicely done", and that there was "room in this [fictional] universe for full length novels", but expressed his ambivalence about "the notion that magic is the best corrective to colonialism".

Year	Award	Category	Result	Ref.
2019	Nebula Award	Novella	Finalist	
2020	Hugo Award	Novella	Finalist	
2020	Ignyte Award	Novella	Finalist	
2020	Locus Award	Novella	Finalist	
2020	Mythopoeic Award	Adult Literature	Finalist	
