= P. Djèlí Clark =

American writer (born 1971)

- Born: Dexter Gabriel; 1971 (age 54–55); Queens, New York, U.S.
- Education: Texas State University (BA, MA); Stony Brook University (Ph.D)
- Occupations: Writer, historian
- Writing career
- Pen name: Phenderson Djèlí Clark
- Years active: 2011–present
- Genres: Fantasy, Science Fiction
- Notable works: A Master of Djinn (2021); Ring Shout (2020)

Academic background
- Thesis: A West Indian Jubilee in America: British Emancipation and the American Abolition Movement (2016)
- Doctoral advisor: April Masten

Academic work
- Discipline: African American History
- Institutions: University of Connecticut
- Website: pdjeliclark.com

Dexter Gabriel (born 1971), better known by his pen name Phenderson Djèlí Clark, is an American speculative fiction writer and historian, who is an assistant professor in the department of history at the University of Connecticut. He uses a pen name to differentiate his literary work from his academic work, and has also published under the name A. Phenderson Clark. This pen name, "Djèlí", makes reference to the griots – traditional Western African storytellers, historians and poets.

In 2022, his fantasy novel A Master of Djinn won the Nebula and Locus Awards. He has also won awards for his short fiction, including the Nebula, Locus and British Fantasy Awards for the novella Ring Shout in 2021.

== Life and career ==
Dexter Gabriel was born in New York City in 1971, but spent most of his early years living in his parents' original home of Trinidad and Tobago. At age eight, he returned to the United States and lived in Staten Island and Brooklyn before moving to Houston, when he was 12. Gabriel went to college at Texas State University, San Marcos, earning a B.A. and then an M.A. in history. He then earned a doctorate in history from Stony Brook University. Gabriel is currently assistant professor in the department of history at the University of Connecticut.

In 2011, Gabriel began publishing short stories variously as P. Djèlí Clark, Djèlí A. Clark, Phenderson Djèlí Clark, and A. Phenderson Clark. Phenderson was his grandfather's name, while Clark was his mother's maiden name; Djèlí refers to West African storytellers, known in French as griots. He chose to use a pen name in order to separate his academic and literary work. In 2016, Clark sold his first major work, a novelette titled "A Dead Djinn in Cairo", to Tor.com.

Since then, he has published novellas, short stories, and a novel. Four of his works – "A Dead Djinn in Cairo", "The Angel of Khan el-Khalili", The Haunting of Tram Car 015 and A Master of Djinn – are set in the same world, an alternate-universe Egypt. They are collectively titled the Ministry of Alchemy series or the Dead Djinn Universe.

He has been announced as Guest of Honour at the 2027 Eastercon and was a Guest of Honor at Readercon 2025.

== Awards ==
Year	Work	Award	Category	Result	Ref.
2018	The Black God's Drums	Nebula Award	Novella	Nominated	
2018	"The Secret Lives of the Nine Negro Teeth of George Washington"	Nebula Award	Short Story	Won	
2019	The Black God's Drums	Alex Award	—	Won	
2019	The Black God's Drums	Crawford Award	—	Shortlisted	
2019	The Black God's Drums	Hugo Award	Novella	Finalist	
2019	The Black God's Drums	Locus Award	Novella	Finalist	
2019	The Black God's Drums	World Fantasy Award	Novella	Finalist	
2019	The Haunting of Tram Car 015	Nebula Award	Novella	Nominated	
2019	"The Secret Lives of the Nine Negro Teeth of George Washington"	Hugo Award	Short Story	Finalist	
2019	"The Secret Lives of the Nine Negro Teeth of George Washington"	Locus Award	Short Story	Won	
2019	"The Secret Lives of the Nine Negro Teeth of George Washington"	Theodore Sturgeon Award	—	Shortlisted	
2020	The Haunting of Tram Car 015	Hugo Award	Novella	Finalist	
2020	The Haunting of Tram Car 015	Ignyte Award	Novella	Finalist	
2020	The Haunting of Tram Car 015	Locus Award	Novella	Finalist	
2020	The Haunting of Tram Car 015	Mythopoeic Award	Adult Literature	Finalist	
2020	Ring Shout	Goodreads Choice Awards	Horror	Finalist—15th	
2020	Ring Shout	Nebula Award	Novella	Won	
2020	Ring Shout	Shirley Jackson Award	Novella	Nominated	
2021	A Master of Djinn	Dragon Award	Alternate History Novel	Nominated	
2021	A Master of Djinn	Goodreads Choice Awards	Fantasy	Finalist	
2021	A Master of Djinn	Nebula Award	Novel	Won	
2021	Ring Shout	British Fantasy Award	Novella	Won	
2021	Ring Shout	Hugo Award	Novella	Finalist	
2021	Ring Shout	Hurston/Wright Legacy Award	Fiction	Nominated	
2021	Ring Shout	Ignyte Award	Novella	Finalist	
2021	Ring Shout	Locus Award	Novella	Won	
2021	Ring Shout	RUSA Codes Reading List	Fantasy	Shortlisted	
2021	Ring Shout	World Fantasy Award	Novella	Nominated	
2022	A Master of Djinn	Compton Crook Award	—	Won	
2022	A Master of Djinn	Hugo Award	Novel	Finalist	
2022	A Master of Djinn	Ignyte Award	Adult Novel	Won	
2022	A Master of Djinn	Locus Award	First Novel	Won	
2022	A Master of Djinn	Mythopoeic Award	Adult Literature	Finalist	
2022	A Master of Djinn	RUSA CODES Reading List	Fantasy	Won	
2022	A Master of Djinn	World Fantasy Award	Novel	Finalist	
2022	If the Martians Have Magic	Ignyte Award	Short Story	Won	
2022	If the Martians Have Magic	Locus Award	Short Story	Finalist	
2022	If the Martians Have Magic	Theodore Sturgeon Award	—	Finalist	
2022	If the Martians Have Magic	World Fantasy Award	Short Fiction	Finalist	
2023	"How to Raise a Kraken in Your Bathtub"	BSFA Award	Short Fiction	Won	
2024	Abeni's Song	Lodestar Award for Best Young Adult Book	—	Finalist	
2024	Abeni's Song	Ignyte Award	Middle Grade Book	Won	
2024	"How to Raise a Kraken in Your Bathtub"	Hugo Award	Short Story	Finalist	
2024	"How to Raise a Kraken in Your Bathtub"	Locus Award	Short Story	Won	
2024	"How to Raise a Kraken in Your Bathtub"	World Fantasy Award	Short Fiction	Finalist	
2024	"What I Remember of Oresha Moon Dragon Devshrata"	Locus Award	Novelette	Finalist	
2025	The Dead Cat Tail Assassins	Locus Award	Novella	Finalist	
2025	A Master of Djinn	Seiun Award	Translated Novel	Finalist	

== Works ==
=== Dead Djinn Universe ===
- "A Dead Djinn in Cairo". Tor.com. May 18, 2016. ASIN B01DJ0NALI.
- "The Angel of Khan el-Khalili". Clockwork Cairo: Steampunk Tales of Egypt. Matthew Bright, ed. Twopenny Books. June 14, 2017. ASIN B071KGGS6M.
- The Haunting of Tram Car 015. Tordotcom. February 19, 2019. ISBN 9781250294807.
- A Master of Djinn. Tordotcom. May 11, 2021. ISBN 9781250267689.

=== For young readers ===
Abeni's Song

1. Abeni's Song. Starscape. July 25, 2023. ISBN 9781250825827.
2. Abeni and the Kingdom of Gold. Starscape. April 29, 2025. ISBN 9781250825858.
3. Abeni and the People Who Could Fly. Starscape. May 4, 2027. ISBN 9781250825889.

=== Standalone novellas ===
- The Black God's Drums. Tordotcom. August 21, 2018. ISBN 9781250294715.
- Ring Shout. Tordotcom. October 13, 2020. ISBN 9781250767028.
- The Dead Cat Tail Assassins. Tordotcom. August 6, 2024. ISBN 9781250767042.

=== Other works ===
- "The Secret Lives of the Nine Negro Teeth of George Washington". Fireside Fiction. February 2018
- "If the Martians Have Magic". Uncanny Magazine. No. 42. September 7, 2021.

== As Dexter Gabriel ==
- Jubilee’s Experiment: The British West Indies and American Abolitionism. Cambridge University Press, April 2023.
