= Hungry Daughters of Starving Mothers =

Short story by Alyssa Wong

"Hungry Daughters of Starving Mothers" is a 2015 urban fantasy/horror story by Alyssa Wong. It was first published in Nightmare magazine.

== Synopsis ==
Jenny is a magical being living in New York City, where she feeds on the negative emotions and thoughts of the people she meets on dating sites. When her latest date's negativity is much stronger than she had anticipated, she finds that lesser negativity no longer satisfies her, and she begins seeking out worse and worse situations.

== Reception ==
"Hungry Daughters of Starving Mothers" won the Nebula Award for Best Short Story of 2015 and the 2016 World Fantasy Award—Short Fiction, and was a finalist for the 2015 Bram Stoker Award for Short Fiction. Kirkus Reviews described it as "an innovative twist on the vampire mythos." Tangent Online commended the story's "premise and (...) narrative voice", as well as its prose, but overall faulted it for being "watered down" and "longer than (...) it needed to be."
