= And Then There Were (N-One) =

Science fiction novella by Sarah Pinsker

- Short story by Sarah Pinsker
- Language: English
- Genres: Science fiction, murder mystery

Publication
- Published in: Uncanny Magazine #15
- Publication date: March 7, 2017

"And Then There Were (N-One)" is a 2017 science fiction/murder mystery novella by Sarah Pinsker. It was first published in Uncanny Magazine. It was republished in the collection Sooner or Later Everything Falls Into the Sea.

== Synopsis ==
When physicist Sarah Pinsker is murdered at SarahCon — an interdimensional convention where everyone is Sarah Pinsker from a different alternate timeline — only insurance investigator Sarah Pinsker can solve the case.

== Reception ==
"And Then There Were (N-One)" was a finalist for the Nebula Award for Best Novella of 2017 and the 2018 Hugo Award for Best Novella. It was later republished in the 2019 collection Sooner or Later Everything Falls into the Sea by Small Beer Press.

Tor.com found it "gloriously high-concept", with "a sense of the minute as potentially revelatory", while Kirkus Reviews described it as "phenomenal". Tangent Online, however, considered it "a fairly straightforward murder mystery", and "rather self-absorbed, for obvious reasons".
