= Ring Shout =

Novella by P. Djeli Clark

- Editor: Tordotcom Publishing
- Author: P. Djèlí Clark
- Cover artist: Henry Sene Yee
- Language: English
- Genre: Dark fantasy, alternate history, historical fantasy
- Set in: Macon, Georgia in 1922
- Publisher: Tor.com Publishing
- Publication date: October 13, 2020
- Publication place: United States
- Media type: Print (hardcover); ebook; audiobook
- Pages: 192
- Awards: BFA—Novella (2021); Locus—Novella (2021); Nebula—Novella (2021)
- ISBN: 9781250767028 (1st ed hardcover)
- OCLC: 1198900102
- Dewey Decimal: 813/.6
- LC Class: PS3603.L36843 R56 2020

Ring Shout, or, Hunting Ku Kluxes in the End Times is a dark historical southern gothic fantasy novella written by American fiction writer P. Djèlí Clark. A hardcover of the novella was published by Tor.com Publishing on October 13, 2020. The story follows Maryse Boudreaux on her quest to hunt and destroy the demons summoned by the Ku Klux Klan known as "Ku Kluxes". She is joined by fellow hunters Sadie Watkins and Cordelia Lawrence, as a supernatural evil is rising in an alternate history of 1920s Macon, Georgia.

The novella, according to Clark, had been in development since 2015, and he pitched the work to his editor after establishing a contract with Tor Publishing in 2019. Clark was inspired by various aspects of his previous research experiences concerning ex-slave narratives from the Works Progress Administration, the music of the ring shout practice, the Gullah culture, and the controversial The Birth of a Nation (1915) film as he developed the novella. Clark also drew inspiration from Beyoncé's music video "Formation", his visits to Georgia, hip hop music from his hometown in Houston, Texas, and novels such as Toni Morrison's Beloved.

Clark has stated that while he had important themes in mind for the work during its drafting process, leading up to its release, he prefers for his audience to form their own interpretations of the novella and its relevance to recent movements and struggles.

== Synopsis ==
Set in an alternate historical world of Macon, Georgia in 1922, the story is told from the perspective of Maryse Boudreaux. At this time, Prohibition is occurring and the town of Macon is known for having Ku Klux Klan marches with many white men, women, and children.

Before the beginning of the story, the Second Klan came to be on November 25, 1915, on the day the trio refers to as "D-Day" or "Devil's Night", when an old witch summoned the "Ku Kluxes" at Stone Mountain in Atlanta. Despite the efforts of formerly enslaved persons such as Robert Smalls to disband the first Klan, they were not able to wipe out the monsters that feed off the hatred and killing of innocent African Americans in the United States. Due to the release of The Birth of a Nation, a product of dark magic, many white people were swayed into believing the narrative of the Ku Klux Klan as saviors and African Americans as evil.

Maryse and her companions, Sadie and Cordy, are a trio of hunters fighting against the demonic forces of the Ku Klux Klan and are gifted with "the sight" to witness the true forms of the hellish "Ku Kluxes". When the girls aren't hunting monsters, they operate the business of spreading "Mama's Water", provided by their leader, throughout Georgia to ward off the supernatural and human evils of the Klan and white people. Despite their unique skills fighting against the Ku Kluxes and the wisdom provided by their Gullah leader, Nana Jean, the Klan continues to threaten the lives of many with violence and dark magic.

== Inspiration ==
=== Ring shout ===
The ring shout is a religious tradition of West-Central African and West African origin with elements of Christianity, associated with African American slaves and within the sea islands of the Carolinas and Georgia. Considered to be a form of worship, a ring shout is conducted in a circle with participating singers and dancers repeating cooperative responses. Clark mentioned that the element of music is an integral element of the novella and the tradition. He emphasizes the importance of the practice from its African roots of slaves and its spiritual power influencing his writing of the novella.

In the book, ring shouts are heard in Nana Jean's barn, which allows the "Shouters" to dance, according to the spirit's will, until the spirit's influence ends. The ring shouts serve as a connection for Maryse to her sword due to her ability to hear the chants of the dead and its link to the old gods.

Notations in between the chapters translate the words of ex-slaves to describe different ring shouts and their specific purposes.

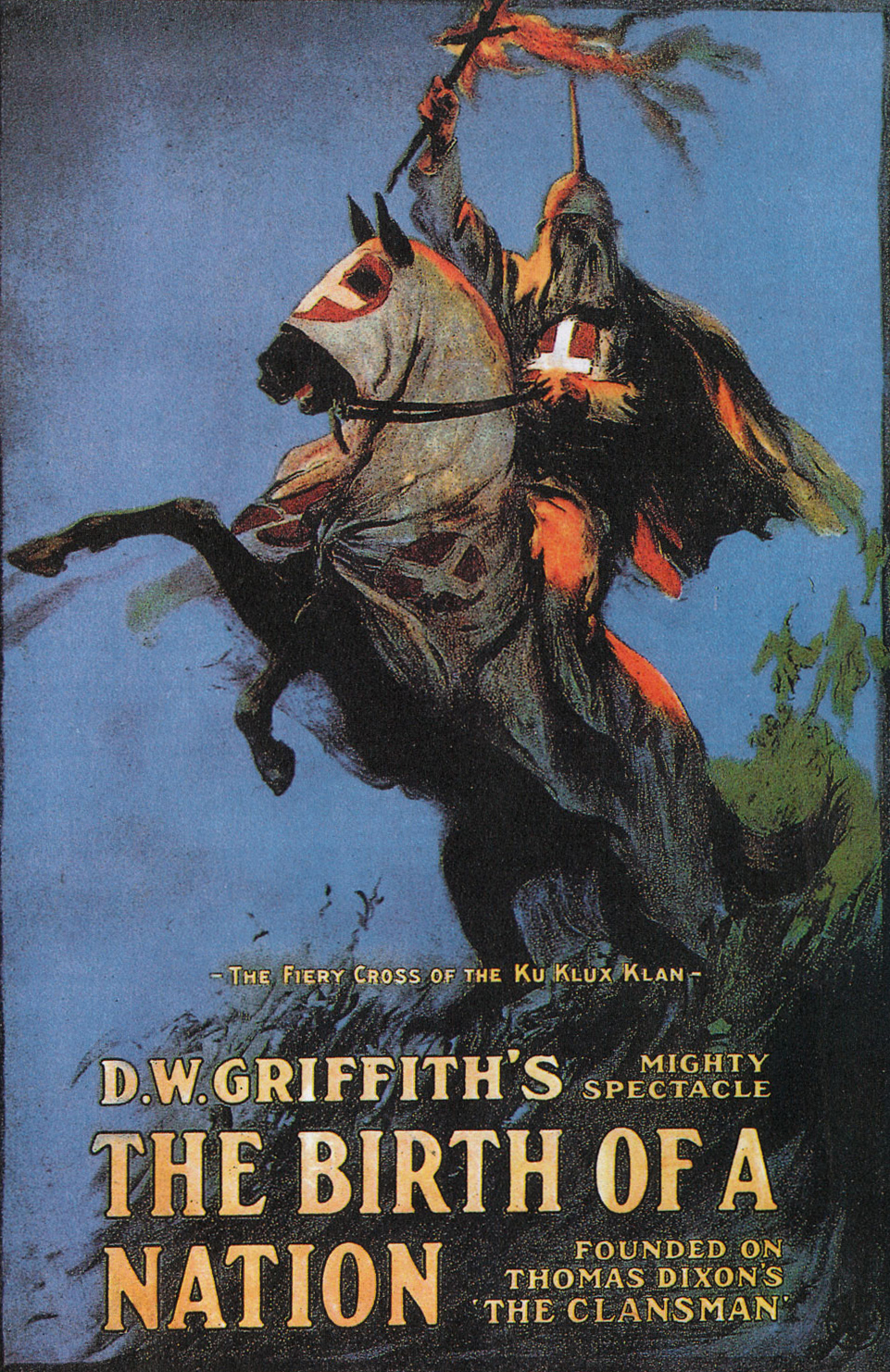
Birth of A Nation (1915) was the film that inspires the revival of the Ku Klux Klan and is a major element in the alternate history setting of Clark's Macon, Georgia.

=== The Birth of a Nation ===
This controversial film inspired the revival of the Ku Klux Klan and its increase in members after its theatrical release in 1915, due to its racist portrayal of African Americans as inferior and the white KKK members as heroes. During an interview with The Nerd Daily, Clark mentions being inspired by his time teaching a class relating to slavery in film, which included covering D. W. Griffith's 1915 film.

In the novella, the film is a form of sorcery from its source material. The books The Clansman and The Leopard's Spots are written by a fictionalized Thomas Dixon Jr. whose family practices dark sorcery. This sorcery leads to the collaboration between Griffith and Dixon to create the film to summon dark powers which bewitched white people in the United States to bend to the will and racist narrative, or magic, of the film.

=== Gullah culture ===
Gullah is a language primarily spoken in the U.S. states of South Carolina (the Gullah) and Georgia (the Geechee) by a subgroup of African Americans known as the Gullah-Geechee. The language originated from modifications of the diverse African languages of African slaves and the English language. In the novella, the Gullah culture is expressed through the ring shouts, the magical arts of Nana Jean, and the translations of the notations between certain chapters.

== Characters ==
=== Maryse Boudreaux ===
The narrator of this story, Maryse is a 25-year-old Ku Klux hunter with the gift of seeing the true forms of the Ku Kluxes based on their distinguishing demonic features. She is the ethical member of the trio, choosing to call out Sadie for her vulgar language and treatment of others. Maryse has the unique ability to summon a sword, originating from supernatural forces associated with ancient African gods, capable of attracting dead spirits only she can see. This blade lets her hear chants that motivate her to fight with more skill against the Ku Kluxes. Before answering the call of Nana Jean, Maryse was pursuing a vendetta against Ku Kluxes after experiencing a mysterious tragedy.

Clark stated that the core of the story is fantasy, and that he knew she would be wielding a sword even before naming her character.

=== Sadie Watkins ===
The 21-year-old, loud-mouthed companion of Maryse and Cordelia, Sadie hunts Ku Kluxes with her Winchester rifle. Sadie is the vulgar member of the party of three, choosing to use racial slurs despite Maryse's protests. However, when Maryse's life is on the line, Sadie doesn't hesitate to save her. Before hearing Nana Jean's call, Sadie was on a rampage in Alabama after her grandfather was killed by Ku Kluxes.

=== Cordelia "Cordy" "Chef" Lawrence ===
The 27-year-old Cordy hunts "Ku Kluxes" with Maryse and Sadie. She fought in World War I serving with the Black Rattlers. She serves as the muscle of the trio, and prevents fights between Sadie's vulgar nature and Maryse's ethical nature. Due to her expertise in crafting bombs to kill German soldiers, she was nicknamed "Chef". She is gifted with "the sight" of witnessing the true forms of the Ku Kluxes. Cordy was originally a Harlem Hellfighter before being called to the service of Nana Jean. Chef is a lesbian.

=== Nana Jean ===
Serving as the leader of the trio, Nana Jean has the strongest connection to the Gullah culture and the ring shouts in her barn. Despite Maryse's doubts about Jean's old ways, she continues to regard her with praise. Nana Jean operates the barn in Georgia and uses her skills to make "Mama's Water", a way to ward off evil, and spread it throughout the rest of Georgia. Nana Jean called to the trio from their lives to be recruited by her in Macon to fight against the Ku Kluxes.

=== Ku Kluxes ===
The demonic forces summoned by the Ku Klux Klan, Ku Kluxes are indistinguishable from human members of the Klan, except to those who have "the sight". They can walk on all fours, grow huge torsos, stand nine feet tall, and have sharp claws, contorted limbs, spiky teeth, long snouts, and more grotesque features. Ku Kluxes are notable for their weak eyes, but strong noses. When they die, they crumble to ash. After their death, people who don't have "the sight" will not be able to see their monstrous characteristics. These monstrosities were summoned by the Second Klan on Devil's Night at Stone Mountain.

=== Other characters ===
- Molly, a freedwoman who analyzes Ku Kluxes. Her family were slaves of the Choctaw.
- Emma Krauss, a German Jewish socialist revolutionary.
- Michael George, Maryse's beau
- Dr Antoine Bisset, a doctor from 1937 who serves the ghoulish Night Doctors
- Aunties Margaret, Ondine, and Jadine, 3 fox-like haints who provide aid and advice to Maryse

== Critical reception ==
NPR's Danny Lore describes the story as "a demonic horror twist on the Jim Crow South," praising "Clark's craft and thoughtfulness... in his use of history", and his "incredibly lively cast" of characters. Lore draws favorable comparisons between Clark's usage of Black history, and the role of that same history in Lovecraft Country (2020) and Watchmen (2019).

Year	Award	Category	Result	Ref.
2020	Goodreads Choice Awards	Horror	Finalist—15th	
2020	Nebula Award	Novella	Won	
2020	Shirley Jackson Award	Novella	Finalist	
2021	British Fantasy Award	Novella	Won	
2021	Hugo Award	Novella	Finalist	
2021	Hurston/Wright Legacy Award	Fiction	Nominated	
2021	Ignyte Award	Novella	Finalist	
2021	Locus Award	Best Novella	Won	
2021	RUSA Codes Reading List	Fantasy	Shortlisted	
2021	World Fantasy Award	Novella	Finalist	

== Adaptation ==
In December 2020 Skydance Television announced the acquisition of the rights to produce a television series based on Clark's novella, with Kasi Lemmons writing and directing as showrunner. Deadline reported that Kiki Layne is currently the only lead cast member of the project. That same month, Clark revealed on his blog, The Musings of a Disgruntled Haradrim..., his conversations with Lemmons, Layne, and producers, while sharing his excitement for the adaptation's development.
