= The Dead Cat Tail Assassins =

2024 novella by P. Djèlí Clark

- Author: P. Djèlí Clark
- Language: English
- Genre: Fantasy
- Publisher: Tordotcom
- Publication date: 6 Aug 2024
- Publication place: United States
- Pages: 224 (hardcover)
- ISBN: 9781250767042

The Dead Cat Tail Assassins is a 2024 novella by American author P. Djèlí Clark.

== Plot ==
Eveen is an undead member of the Dead Cat Tail Assassins in the city of Tal Abisi. While she was alive, she promised her afterlife to the goddess Aeril. Eveen has been resurrected and has lost all of the memories of her previous life.

Eveen is assigned a contract from an anonymous client. Her assignment is to kill a girl named Sky. When Eveen sees Sky, she remembers part of her past, which should be impossible. Eveen helps Sky escape instead of killing her; she learns that Sky is a time-traveling version of Eveen herself.

Eveen learns that her anonymous client is Pol Oranus, a patriarch of Tal Abisi. Eveen killed his son, and he is seeking revenge. Oranus hired Eveen to kill her past self as a way to avoid a prohibition against killing assassins.

As they journey together, Sky and Eveen realize that various versions of their city's history do not add up exactly. In particular, the story of the Clockwork King who once waged war against Tal Abisi has two different versions.

Eveen and Sky are pursued by other members of the Dead Cat Tails, who hope to kill them before Aeril punishes the entire guild for Eveen's failure. Eveen and Sky surrender to Pol Oranus. They summon Aeril herself as an arbiter. Eveen reveals that Sky is from an alternate universe, and therefore is not exactly the same as Eveen. Sky then summons a version of Aeril from her own universe. The two Aerils agree to void the assassination contract against Sky. Sky and Eveen kill Pol Oranus together.

== Major themes ==
Fabienne Schwizer wrote that "As with the rest of [Clark's] work, The Dead Cat Tail Assassins is in constant conversation with Black storytelling." Schwizer wrote that Clark's work as a historian informs his fiction writing, particularly noting that "a linguistic and stylistic shift" allows the divine element in the story to "[refer] back to the concept of ghostly ancestors."

Gary K. Wolfe of Locus discussed the role that amnesia plays in the story:

Like Chekhov’s famous gun, it seems to be an unstated principle among writers as diverse as Robert Ludlum and Octavia E. Butler that a character suffering from total amnesia in the first act is in for some world-shaking revelations by the third. The same is true of P. Djèlí Clark’s The Dead Cat Tail Assassins...

Wolfe also writes that the character draws from noir fiction tropes, stating that the protagonist Eveen "tends to stretch the rules, is quick with cynical wisecracks, and is a bit too blithe about violence". Wolfe also writes that the city of Tal Abisi serves as both the story's setting and "very nearly as a character in itself". Wolfe states that "the richness of detail that Clark provides gives the whole thing something of the flavor of a hardboiled mystery set in New Orleans during Mardi Gras."

== Background ==
In an interview for the Los Angeles Public Library, Clark described the pitch for novella as "John Wick meets Dungeons and Dragons." When asked about the origin of the name of the Dead Cat Tail Assassins, Clark states that he and his best friend often made up silly band names. Clark recalled that "I like to imagine that it gave me practice for thinking up memorable and ridiculous names."

== Reception ==
In a starred review in Library Journal, Marlene Harris called the novella "reminiscent of Max Gladstone's Craft Sequence. Harris praised the "wildly surprising caper fantasy", writing that it would "keep readers on the edge of their seats" and "appeal to all lovers of urban fantasy". A review in Kirkus Reviews praised the novella, calling it "well crafted, exciting, darkly comic, and just gory enough." The review also referenced the work of author Max Gladstone, writing that "there's still juice in [the] trope" of contract-based relationships between deities and mortals. Gary K. Wolfe of Locus praised the character of Eveen, the setting of Tal Abisi, and stated that "many readers might be hoping for more Tal Abisi in future stories." Publishers Weekly called the novella "pure entertainment", writing that "Clark’s plot moves at a breakneck clip with quick wit, offbeat characters, and plenty of intrigue." Alex Brown of Reactor wrote that Clark is "masterful at crafting vividly detailed worlds with characters that feel realistic and lived in. Not a detail is wasted or meaningless..." Brown concluded that the novella is "light and refreshing, yet also thoughtful and provoking."

In a review for Grimdark Magazine, Fabienne Schwizer called the novella "an interesting, and slightly jarring, reading experience" that marks a departure from Clark's preview work. Schwizer wrote that the novel was fun to read and thought-provoking, but felt that "the novella format didn’t quite fit this story. I think it would be a very strong concept for either a short story, or to expand in a full-length novel. As it is, the reader receives both too little information for true depth and too much information that seems to relate only tangentially to the story and worldbuilding."

Awmeo Azad of the Michigan Daily praised the pacing and the setting of Tal Abisi, stating that "Clark seamlessly blends inspiration from Swahili city-states, Renaissance Venice and Angkor Wat to create a bustling, popping landscape." Azad criticized the dialogue of the story, writing that it "robs Clark’s world of its creativity and shatters immersion. This corniness could possibly be excused in a kid’s novel, but the constant profanity indicates an older target audience." Azad felt that the novella was inferior to Clark's previous work, particularly the short story "The Angel of Khan el-Khalili".
