= A Master of Djinn =

2021 novel by P. Djèlí Clark

- 1st US edition
- Author: P. Djèlí Clark
- Cover artist: Stephan Martiniere
- Language: English
- Series: Dead Djinn Universe
- Genre: Steampunk; Fantasy
- Set in: Cairo
- Publisher: Tordotcom
- Publication date: May 11, 2021
- Publication place: United States
- Media type: Print (hardcover), ebook, kindle
- Pages: 392
- Awards: Compton Crook Award; Nebula—Novel; Ignyte Award; Locus—First Novel
- ISBN: 9781250267689 (1st ed US hardcover)
- Preceded by: The Haunting of Tram Car 015

A Master of Djinn is a 2021 fantasy steampunk novel by American writer P. Djèlí Clark, published by Tor.com. The book is part of Clark's the Dead Djinn Universe and follows the events of the novelette "A Dead Djinn in Cairo" and the novella The Haunting of Tram Car 015.

A Master of Djinn won the 2021 Nebula Award for Best Novel, the 2022 Ignyte Award for Best Novel, Locus Award for Best First Novel, and the Compton Crook Award for Best Novel. It was a finalist for several other literary awards.

== Plot ==
In 1912 Cairo, Fatma el-Sha'arawi serves as an agent for the Ministry of Alchemy, Enchantments, and Supernatural Entities. The Brotherhood of Al-Jahiz is a secret society of Englishmen who admire Al-Jahiz, a mystic who reintroduced magic to the world around forty years ago. Many members of the Brotherhood are murdered by a man in a golden mask who claims to be Al-Jahiz himself. Among the victims is the Brotherhood's founder, Alistair Worthington. Fatma visits the murder scene and meets Abigail Worthington, Alistair's daughter.

Fatma is assisted by her new Ministry partner, Hadia Abdel Hafez, and her lover, Siti. Siti is a follower of the old Egyptian religion, a devotee of Sekhmet. Through Siti, Fatma meets Ahmad, a priest of Sobek.

A man wearing a golden mask and calling himself Al-Jahiz begins appearing in the poor neighborhoods of Cairo. Fatma and the police attempt to arrest him for murder, but he escapes. Fatma and Hadia interview Alexander Worthington, the son of Alistair Worthington. Alexander is unhelpful, but his sister Abigail provides the agents with financial documents from the Brotherhood.

The Ministry is attacked by Al-Jahiz and an army of ghuls. During this fight, Al-Jahiz shows that he has the ability to control djinn, even those ostensibly loyal to the Ministry. Al-Jahiz steals documents from the Ministry's vault, which contain plans to build the Clock of Worlds. (Note: This machine also appears in the novelette “A Dead Djinn in Cairo.”) This Machine can open a portal to the Kaf, the world of the djinn.

Days later, Fatma and Hadia guard the royal palace, where the king of Egypt is preparing for a summit with other world powers. Al-Jahiz appears, accusing the king of corruption and stoking conflict between the world's leaders. Siti and Fatma attack him. Al-Jahiz takes control of Siti, revealing her to be half-djinn. Fatma steals Al-Jahiz's gold mask and sees that his face ripples. This reveals that he is using magic to disguise his face; he is not the original Al-Jahiz, but an imposter.

During the course of their investigation, Fatma and Hadia learn of the Seal of Sulayman. This relic takes the form of a ring that grants the wearer the power to control djinn. More clues implicate Alexander Worthington. Fatma confronts Alexander and Abigail at the Worthington mansion. Fatma reveals the truth: the real culprit is Abigail Worthington, who has been masquerading as Al-Jahiz. Abigail confesses. She plans to use the Seal of Sulayman to control djinn, take over Egypt, and restore the failing British Empire.

Abigail uses the Clock of Worlds to open a portal to another dimension. She summons the Nine Ifrit Lords, the most powerful of all djinn, and controls them. Ahmad, the priest of Sobek, bites the ring from Abigail's hand. The freed Ifrit Lords attempt to raise an army of djinn, but the djinn of Cairo reject them. The Ifrit Lords and the lesser djinn go to war; Abdeen Palace is destroyed. Fatma uses the ring to force the Ifrit Lords back into their own dimension. She returns the ring to Ahmad, who leaves Cairo. An Ifrit erases all of Abigail's memories before leaving the city.

== Reception ==
Publishers Weekly gave the novel a starred review, calling it "stunning" and a "fantastic feat of postcolonial imagination", lauding Clark's "colorful prose," "thorough worldbuilding," and "keen, critical eye toward gender, class, and imperialism."

Kristi Chadwick at Library Journal gave the novel a starred review, calling it "a richly detailed, action-packed novel" and praising Clark's "fantastical worldbuilding [that] highlights thematic issues of colonialism, spirituality, and race relations" as well as "issues of gender and class".

Booklist gave the book a starred review, and described it as a "delightful combination of mystery, fantasy, and romance."

Marisa Mercurio of Strange Horizons called the novel "smart", "enormously fun", "an adventure that grapples with a history of imperialism", and praised Clark's rendering of a diverse cast of women from a variety of backgrounds.

== Awards and nominations ==
Year	Award	Category	Result	Ref.
2021	Dragon Award	Best Alternate History Novel	Nominated	
2021	Goodreads Choice Awards	Fantasy	Finalist	
2021	Nebula Award	Best Novel	Won	
2022	Compton Crook Award	—	Won	
2022	Hugo Award	Best Novel	Finalist	
2022	Ignyte Award	Adult Novel	Won	
2022	Locus Award	Best First Novel	Won	
2022	Mythopoeic Award	Adult Literature	Finalist	
2022	RUSA CODES Reading List	Fantasy	Won	
2022	World Fantasy Award	Novel	Finalist	
2025	Seiun Award	Translated Novel	Finalist	
