= William Ledbetter =

- Ledbetter at Worldcon 2026
- Occupation: Writer
- Writing career
- Language: English
- Years active: 2000–present
- Genre: Science fiction
- Notable awards: Nebula Award for Best Novelette
- Website: www.williamledbetter.com

William Ledbetter (born 1961) is a science fiction writer whose short stories have been published in Fantasy & Science Fiction, Analog: Science Fiction & Fact, Jim Baen's Universe, Writers of the Future, Escape Pod, and other magazines. His novelette "The Long Fall Up" won the 2016 Nebula Award.

== Life ==
William Ledbetter was born in a small town in Indiana in 1961, the year humans first flew in space. After growing up in Indiana, he moved to Waco, Texas in 1995. He now lives in Prosper, Texas, north of Dallas.

As a child, Ledbetter watched the Apollo 11 Moon landing and dreamed of being an astronaut but was unable to pursue that career due to poor eyesight. Instead, Ledbetter began a thirty-year career as a mechanical designer in the aerospace industry, including work on the radiator system for the International Space Station.

== Writing career ==
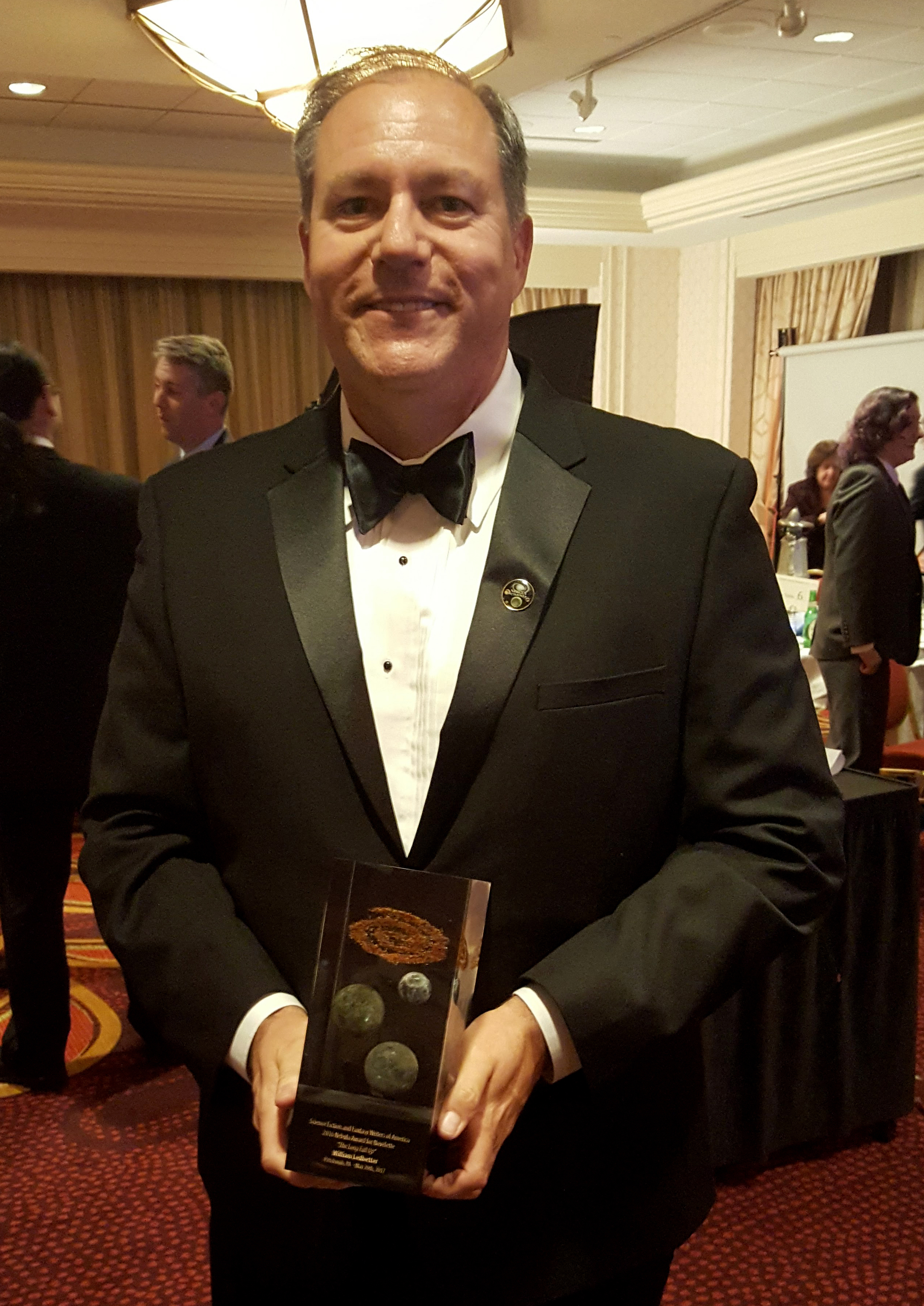
William Ledbetter holding the Nebula Award for his novelette "The Long Fall Up" (2017)

Ledbetter has published a number of science fiction short stories in magazines such as Fantasy & Science Fiction, Analog: Science Fiction & Fact, Jim Baen's Universe, Writers of the Future, Escape Pod, and others. Among the anthologies including his stories is The Year’s Best Military SF and Space Opera.

Ledbetter's novelette "The Long Fall Up," originally published in Fantasy & Science Fiction, won the 2016 Nebula Award. The science fiction story focuses on a future where children are not allowed to be born in zero gravity due to the risk of disfiguring mutations. His story "The Rings of Mars" was a winner in the Writers of the Future contest.

From 2007 to 2024, Ledbetter administered the Jim Baen Memorial Short Story Award contest for Baen Books and the National Space Society. He edited the anthology The Jim Baen Memorial Award: The First Decade, released by Simon & Schuster, and is a consulting editor at Heroic Fantasy Quarterly.
