= Star Wars: Escape from Valo =

American novel (2024)

- Author: Alyssa Wong; Daniel José Older
- Language: English
- Genre: Science fiction
- Publication date: January 30, 2024
- Media type: Novel

Star Wars: The High Republic: Escape from Valo is an American middle grade novel in the Star Wars universe, co-written by Alyssa Wong and Daniel José Older.

== Background ==
The novel was first officially announced in November 2023, as the first title in Phase III of the Star Wars: The High Republic multimedia project. It is book 6 in the Random House middle grade Star Wars: The High Republic series, intended for ages 8-12. The novel features four protagonists: Ram Jomaram, who had previously appeared in earlier titles, and three new characters making their debut: Gavi, Kildo, and Tep Tep.

== Development ==
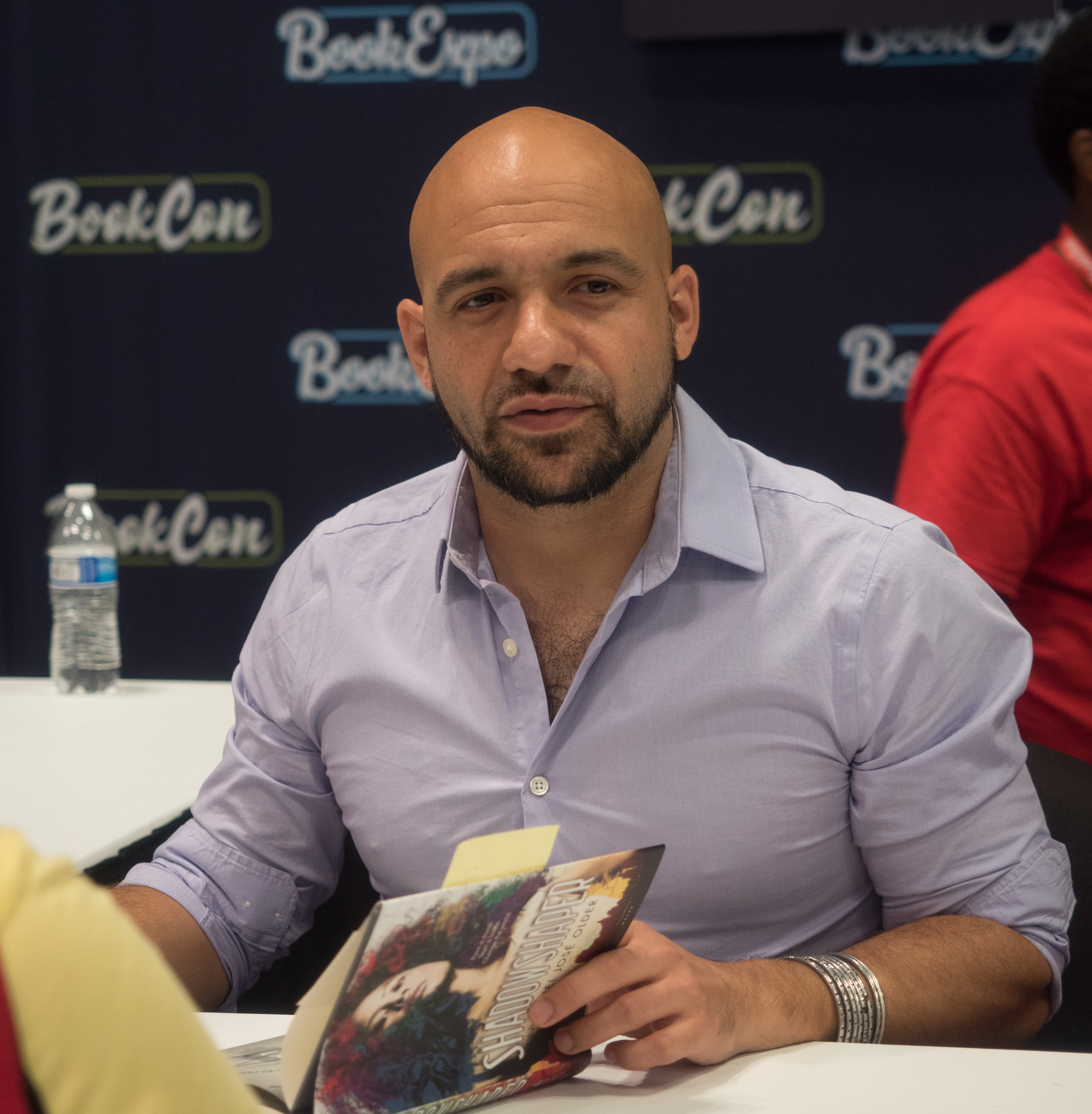
Daniel Jose Older, one of the two coauthors

The novel's authors are Alyssa Wong and Daniel José Older. It is illustrated by Petur Antonsson. Older noted in an interview that Wong dragged him out of retirement to write Escape from Valo, comparing himself to "an aging hitman in a cabin with a dog".

The antagonist Nihil alien race are featured in several other Star Wars: The High Republic novels, including Into The Dark by Claudia Gray, Path of Vengeance by Cavan Scott, and Light of the Jedi by Charles Soule.

== Plot ==
The Jedi attempt to liberate the Occlusion Zone, which is controlled by the evil Nihil. Among them is padawan Ram Jomaram, who tries to free his home planet, Valo. Ram, who hides his Jedi identity as a vigilante called the Scarlet Skull, encounters three young other Jedi, and becomes their leader.

=== Themes ===
The novel revolves around a coming-of-age storyline. Through the story, main characters explore themes of navigate duty, first crushes, belonging. As with other Star Wars media, there is a focus on the concept of attachments for the Jedi. Older noted in an interview for the official Star Wars website;

"Have you read Hans Christian Anderson? Fairytales are dark and that is a lot of where middle grade comes from. Because kids do go through horrible experiences and it's not fair to deprive the kids who have been through that of literature that speaks to them in order to protect the ones who haven't. The heart of so much children's literature is having fun, telling a good, fun adventure story and also doing it in a way that speaks to all the different truths that kids are living, including the really hard ones and not trying to shield them from it or pretend like everything is awesome."

== Reception ==
Tyler Bradshaw of Star Wars News Net praised the evolution of Ram Jomaram's character in the work, who is forced out of his comfort zone and into a new role as a leader and protector of less experienced young people. Brandshaw also highlighted the depth and moral conflict of Driggit's character, a former friend and ally of the protagonists who is forced to join the enemy faction, the Nihil, in order to protect her family and loved ones. Bradshaw concluded his review by calling the work a "tasteful treat from start to finish".

Author Alyssa Wong noted, "There's also a pretty big queer High Republic fandom contingent and seeing how supportive they have been of each other and how excited they are about the books makes me really happy."

Kirkus Reviews highlighted the novel's "racially diverse and casually queer cast of complex characters".

Eric Eilersen of Youtini praised the inclusion of trans and non-binary characters in the story, celebrating that trans children could see themselves reflected in main characters of the Star Wars universe.
