= Scott Baker (writer) =

American writer

Scott MacMartin Baker (born September 29, 1947, in Oak Park, Illinois) is an American science fiction, fantasy, and horror writer.

His first novel, Symbiote's Crown, is "a slyly intelligent though uneasily metaphysical Space Opera" according to The Encyclopedia of Science Fiction. The French edition won a Prix Apollo Award in 1982. In addition, he won the World Fantasy Award in 1984 for his short story "Still Life with Scorpion".

== Bibliography ==
=== Novels ===
- Symbiote's Crown (1978) [Prix Apollo Winner] ISBN 978-0425038390
- Nightchild (1979) ISBN 0671469312
- Dhampire (1982) ISBN 0671446665
- Drink the Fire from the Flames (1987) (Ashlu) ISBN 0812531477
- Firedance (1986) (Ashlu) ISBN 0812531450
- Webs (1989) ISBN 0812515587
- Ancestral Hungers (1996) ISBN 031285868X

=== Short story collections (in French only) ===
- Nouvelle recette pour canard au sang (1983)
- Fringales (1985)
- Aléas (1985)

=== Short stories (in English) ===
- Flatsquid Thrills (1982)
- The Path (1982)
- The Lurking Duck (1983) (World Fantasy nominee)
- Still Life with Scorpion (1984) (World Fantasy winner)
- Sea Change (1986) (Locus Awards nominee)
- Nesting Instinct (1987) (World Fantasy nominee)
- The Sins of the Fathers (1988)
- Varicose Worms (1989) (World Fantasy nominee, Locus Awards nominee)
- Alimentary Tract (1990)
- The Jamesburg Incubus (1990)
- Virus Dreams (1993)
- Prospero (1993)
- Full Fathom Deep (1995)
- Feral Frolics (2014)

=== Anthologies (in French only) ===
- Ombres portées (1990)
