= A Song for a New Day =

Novel by Sarah Pinsker

- Cover of first edition
- Author: Sarah Pinsker
- Cover artist: Jason Booher
- Language: English
- Genre: Science fiction
- Publisher: Berkley Books
- Publication date: September 10, 2019
- Publication place: United States
- Media type: Print (paperback), ebook
- Pages: 370
- ISBN: 978-1-984802-58-3

A Song for a New Day is a science fiction novel by American writer Sarah Pinsker, first published in trade paperback and ebook by Berkley Books in September 2019. The first British edition was issued in hardcover and ebook by Ad Astra/Head of Zeus in August 2020.

== Summary ==
The novel follows the life of a musician in a future where pandemics and terrorism make public events, such as concerts, illegal.

== Reception ==
Kirkus Reviews called A Song for a New Day "a gorgeous novel that celebrates what can happen when one person raises her voice," while Publishers Weekly gave the book a starred review and said "this tale of hope and passion is a remarkable achievement."

== Awards ==
A Song for a New Day won the 2019 Nebula Award for Best Novel, was a finalist for the 2020 Locus Award for Best Novel, and was nominated for the 2020 Compton Crook Award.
