= Gregory Norman Bossert =

American writer and filmmaker

- Bossert at the 2026 World Fantasy Convention
- Born: January 9, 1962 (age 64); Boston, Massachusetts, U.S.
- Occupations: Writer, Filmmaker
- Writing career
- Period: 1981–present
- Genres: Speculative fiction, science fiction, fantasy (genre), horror fiction
- Website: www.gregorynormanbossert.com

Gregory Norman Bossert (born January 9, 1962) is an American writer and filmmaker. He won the World Fantasy Award and was a finalist for the Sturgeon Award. He lives in Marin County, California, and works at Industrial Light & Magic.

== Writing ==
Bossert's first sale was to Asimov's Science Fiction in 2009. He attended the Clarion Workshop in 2010. His story "The Telling" from Beneath Ceaseless Skies #109, November 2012, won the World Fantasy Award for Best Short Story, and his story "Bloom" from Asimov's Science Fiction, December 2013, was a finalist for the 2014 Theodore Sturgeon Award. Both stories also appeared on Locus Online yearly recommended reading lists.

== Film ==
Bossert works in the feature film industry. He also creates short animated films, including the One Minute Weird Tales series for Weird Tales, and promotional videos for Abrams Books and Cheeky Frawg Books.

== Awards ==
- The Telling (2013) (World Fantasy Award for Best Short Story)
- "Bloom" (2014) (Finalist for the Theodore Sturgeon Award)

== Bibliography ==
=== Short fiction ===
Chapbooks

The Night Soil Salvagers 2020

Stories (Note: Short stories unless otherwise noted.)

Title	Year	First published	Reprinted/collected	Notes
The Union of Soil and Sky	2010	"The Union of Soil and Sky". Asimov's Science Fiction. 134 (4&5). April–May 2010.		Novella
The Telling	2012	"The Telling". Beneath Ceaseless Skies. 109. November 2012.		Winner, World Fantasy Award—Short Fiction, 2013
Lost Wax	2013	"Lost Wax". Asimov's Science Fiction. 37 (8): 56–70. August 2013.		Novelette
Bloom	2013	"Bloom". Asimov's Science Fiction. 37 (12): 57–69. December 2013.		Finalist, Theodore Sturgeon Award, 2014
Twelve and Tag	2015	"Twelve and Tag". Asimov's Science Fiction. 39 (3): 46–60. March 2015.		Novelette

———————
