= If the Martians Have Magic =

2021 Sci-fi short story

"If the Martians Have Magic" is a 2021 science fantasy short story by P. Djèlí Clark. It was first published in Uncanny Magazine.

== Synopsis ==
The first Martian invasion was repelled by biological contamination. The second was repelled by humans using salvaged Martian hardware. The third was repelled by magic. Decades later, while studying the surviving Martian prisoners, Minette Francis discovers that they too may be able to use magic.

== Reception ==
"If the Martians Have Magic" won the 2022 Ignyte Award for Best Short Story, and was a finalist for the 2022 World Fantasy Award for Best Short Story and the 2022 Theodore Sturgeon Award.

Strange Horizons called it "remarkable" and "difficult to classify", and lauded Clark for "seamlessly weav[ing] the two genres [of science fiction and fantasy] together". Locus praised it as "lovely stuff, a delirious melding of science fiction and otherworldly magic, not to mention politics and bureaucracy, [with] surprises at every turn," declaring it to be "truly marvelous" and "[o]ne of the stories of the year."
