= Where Oaken Hearts Do Gather =

2021 short story by Sarah Pinsker

"Where Oaken Hearts Do Gather" is a 2021 fantasy/horror short story by American writer Sarah Pinsker. It was first published in Uncanny Magazine.

== Synopsis ==
The story is told in the form of comments posted by several contributors on a crowdsourced website discussing the history and meaning of the (fictitious) folk song "Where Oaken Hearts Do Gather". The song tells the story of a woman who takes her lover's heart from his chest and replaces it with an acorn, after which the townspeople hang the young man and destroy the local oak trees. One of the commenters, HenryMartyn, is a student researching the song's origin. In the comments, he discusses the work of a professor who disappeared years earlier while researching the song, and his own work retracing the professor's steps to the English village of Gall, which he believed to be the source of the legend narrated in the song. He reports that Jenny, a local historian in Gall, has offered to show him an old oak tree in the woods; after that, no further comments from HenryMartyn appear.

== Reception ==
Locus considered that the story's "destination is clear enough (...) but the journey is good meaty fun." A. C. Wise felt it made "excellent use of form."

== Awards ==
"Where Oaken Hearts Do Gather" won the Nebula Award for Best Short Story of 2021, the 2022 Eugie Award, and the 2022 Hugo Award for Best Short Story.
