= Sarah Pinsker =

American science fiction author

- Occupation: Writer
- Writing career
- Language: English
- Years active: 2012–present
- Genres: Science fiction, fantasy
- Website: sarahpinsker.com

Sarah Pinsker is an American science fiction and fantasy author. She is a nine-time finalist for the Nebula Award, and her debut novel A Song for a New Day won the 2019 Nebula for Best Novel while her story "Our Lady of the Open Road" won the 2016 Nebula Award for Best Novelette. Her novelette "Two Truths and a Lie" received both the Nebula Award and the Hugo Award. Her fiction has also won the Philip K. Dick Award, the Theodore Sturgeon Award and been a finalist for the Hugo, World Fantasy, and Tiptree Awards.

== Life ==
Pinsker was born in New York and lived in several parts of the United States including Illinois and Texas. When she was 14, her family settled in Toronto, Canada. She returned to the US to attend Goucher College where she studied history.

In addition to writing fiction she is a singer-songwriter with the band Stalking Horses and has had multiple albums released through independent labels. She also volunteers as director at large for the Science Fiction & Fantasy Writers of America (SFWA) and hosts the Baltimore Science Fiction Society's Dangerous Voices Variety Hour reading series.

== Writing ==
Pinsker says her writing is heavily influenced by the science fiction and literary fiction which filled her parents' home, adding she is one of the rare authors who read "short stories as much as novels" when she was young. Among her early influences as an author were the works of Ursula K. Le Guin and Kate Wilhelm. Later influences on her fiction include Octavia Butler, Karen Joy Fowler, Kij Johnson, and Kelly Link.

Pinsker started out publishing her short fiction in magazines such as Asimov's Science Fiction, Fantasy & Science Fiction, Lightspeed, Strange Horizons, Daily Science Fiction, the Journal of Unlikely Cartography, and Fireside. Anthologies containing her stories include Long Hidden, How to Live on Other Planets, Queers Destroy Science Fiction, and Whose Future Is It?. Among the collections of the "year's best" stories which include her stories are The Best Science Fiction of the Year Volume 2, Year's Best Weird Fiction Vol 2, Year's Best Young Adult Speculative Fiction 2015, The Year's Best YA Speculative Fiction and The Year's Best Military and Adventure Fiction 2015.

In 2019, her debut novel A Song for a New Day was published. The novel follows the life of a musician in a future where pandemics and terrorism makes public events such as concerts illegal. In 2020, it won the Nebula Award for Best Novel of 2019.

Pinsker's fiction has been called "thoughtful, subtle", "creepy" and "dreamlike". Speaking of her fiction, Pinsker says "It is a good time to be someone who has something to say about a group or a personal experience that hasn't been touched on before. Science fiction looks at the world through a slightly different lens, so it's fun to put that lens onto new experiences."

== Awards ==
Year	Work	Award	Category	Result	Ref.
2013	"In Joy, Knowing the Abyss Behind"	Nebula Award	Novelette	Finalist	
2014	"In Joy, Knowing the Abyss Behind"	Theodore Sturgeon Award	—	Won	
2014	"A Stretch of Highway Two Lanes Wide"	Nebula Award	Short Story	Finalist	
2015	"Our Lady of the Open Road"	Nebula Award	Novelette	Won	
2016	"Our Lady of the Open Road"	Theodore Sturgeon Award	—	Finalist	
2016	"Sooner or Later Everything Falls into the Sea"	Nebula Award	Novelette	Finalist	
2017	And Then There Were (N-One)	Nebula Award	Novella	Finalist	
2017	"Wind Will Rove"	Nebula Award	Novelette	Finalist	
2018	And Then There Were (N-One)	Eugie Award	—	Finalist	
2018	And Then There Were (N-One)	Hugo Award	Novella	Finalist	
2018	And Then There Were (N-One)	Locus Award	Novella	Finalist	
2018	And Then There Were (N-One)	Theodore Sturgeon Award	—	Finalist	
2018	"The Court Magician"	Nebula Award	Short Story	Finalist	
2018	"Wind Will Rove"	Hugo Award	Novelette	Finalist	
2018	"Wind Will Rove"	Locus Award	Novelette	Finalist	
2019	"The Blur in the Corner of Your Eye"	Nebula Award	Novelette	Finalist	
2019	"The Court Magician"	Hugo Award	Short Story	Finalist	
2019	"The Court Magician"	Locus Award	Short Story	Finalist	
2019	"The Court Magician"	World Fantasy Award	Short Fiction	Finalist	
2019	A Song for a New Day	Nebula Award	Novel	Won	
2020	"The Blur in the Corner of Your Eye"	Hugo Award	Novelette	Finalist	
2020	"The Blur in the Corner of Your Eye"	Locus Award	Novelette	Finalist	
2020	"The Blur in the Corner of Your Eye"	World Fantasy Award	Short Fiction	Finalist	
2020	A Song for a New Day	Compton Crook Award	—	Finalist	
2020	A Song for a New Day	Locus Award	First Novel	Finalist	
2020	Sooner or Later Everything Falls into the Sea	Locus Award	Collection	Finalist	
2020	Sooner or Later Everything Falls into the Sea	Philip K. Dick Award	—	Won	
2020	Sooner or Later Everything Falls into the Sea	World Fantasy Award	Collection	Finalist	
2020	"Two Truths and a Lie"	Bram Stoker Award	Long Fiction	Finalist	
2020	"Two Truths and a Lie"	Nebula Award	Novelette	Won	
2021	"Two Truths and a Lie"	Hugo Award	Novelette	Won	
2021	"Two Truths and a Lie"	Locus Award	Novelette	Finalist	
2021	"Where Oaken Hearts Do Gather"	Nebula Award	Short Story	Won	
2022	We Are Satellites	Locus Award	Science Fiction Novel	Finalist	
2022	"Where Oaken Hearts Do Gather"	Eugie Award	—	Won	
2022	"Where Oaken Hearts Do Gather"	Hugo Award	Short Story	Won	
2022	"Where Oaken Hearts Do Gather"	Locus Award	Short Story	Won	
2022	"Where Oaken Hearts Do Gather"	World Fantasy Award	Short Fiction	Finalist	
2023	"Sooner or Later Everything Falls Into the Sea"	Seiun Award	Translated Short Story	Won	
2024	Lost Places	Locus Award	Collection	Finalist	
2024	"One Man's Treasure"	Hugo Award	Novelette	Finalist	
2024	"One Man's Treasure"	Locus Award	Novelette	Finalist	
2024	"There's a Door to the Land of the Dead in the Land of the Dead"	Locus Award	Short Story	Finalist	
2025	Haunt Sweet Home	Locus Award	Novella	Finalist	
2025	Signs of Life	Hugo Award	Novelette	Finalist	
2026	"The Millay Illusion"	Hugo Award	Novelette	Finalist	
2026	"The Millay Illusion"	Locus Award	Novelette	Finalist	
2026	"Two Truths and a Lie"	Seiun Award	Translated Short Story	Finalist	

== Bibliography ==
=== Novels ===
- Pinsker, Sarah (2019). A Song for a New Day. Berkley Books. ISBN 9781984802583.
- —— (2021). We Are Satellites (paperback 1st ed.). Berkley Books. ISBN 9781984802606.

=== Chapbooks ===
- Pinsker, Sarah (2020). Two Truths and a Lie (ebook ed.). Tor Books. ISBN 9781250759733.
- —— (2021). A Better Way of Saying (ebook ed.). Tor Books. ISBN 9781250834652.

=== Collections ===
- Pinsker, Sarah (2019). Sooner or Later Everything Falls into the Sea. Small Beer Press. ISBN 9781618731555.
- —— (2023). Lost Places: Stories (paperback ed.). Small Beer Press. ISBN 9781618731999.

=== Short fiction ===
Note: (Note: Short stories unless otherwise noted.)

Year	Title	First published	Reprinted/collected	Notes
2012	Queen for a Day	Pinsker, Sarah (2012). "Queen for a Day". City Paper.		
2012	Smashing Bottles	Pinsker, Sarah (2012). "Smashing Bottles". Emprise Review.		
2012	Broken Stones	Sarah, Pinsker (March 2012). "Broken Stones". Every Day Fiction.		
2012	Twenty Ways the Desert Could Kill You	Pinsker, Sarah (July 2012). "Twenty Ways the Desert Could Kill You". Daily Science Fiction: 20–22.		
2012	The Ants Go Marching	Pinsker, Sarah (November 2012). "The Ants Go Marching". Stupefying Stories. 2 (1).		
2013	A Beastly Game	Pinsker, Sarah (May 31, 2013). "A Beastly Game". Electric Spec. 8 (2).		
2013	In Joy, Knowing the Abyss Behind	Pinsker, Sarah (July 1–8, 2013). "In Joy, Knowing the Abyss Behind". Strange Horizons.		
2013	Join Our Team of Time Travel Professionals	Pinsker, Sarah (July 2013). "Join Our Team of Time Travel Professionals". Daily Science Fiction: 18.		
2013	Excerpted Electronic Archives from the Founding of the Demon Pitted Track Roller Derby Association	Pinsker, Sarah (December 2013). "Excerpted Electronic Archives from the Founding of the Demon Pitted Track Roller Derby Association". Every Day Fiction.		
2014	Monsters, Beneath the Bed and Otherwise	Pinsker, Sarah (January 2014). "Monsters, Beneath the Bed and Otherwise". Fierce Family: 153–165.		
2014	The Transdimensional Horsemaster Rabbis of Mpumalanga Province	Pinsker, Sarah (February 2014). "The Transdimensional Horsemaster Rabbis of Mpumalanga Province". Asimov's Science Fiction. 38 (2): 68–79.		
2014	They Sent Runners Out	Pinsker, Sarah (February 2014). "They Sent Runners Out". Fireside Magazine (10).		
2014	A Stretch of Highway Two Lanes Wide	Pinsker, Sarah (March–April 2014). "A Stretch of Highway Two Lanes Wide". F&SF. 126 (3&4): 110–120.		
2014	Headlong	Pinsker, Sarah (March 20, 2014). "Headlong". The Future Embodied: Evolution of the Human Body.		
2014	There Will Be One Vacant Chair	Pinsker, Sarah (May 2014). "There Will Be One Vacant Chair". Long Hidden: Speculative Fiction from the Margins of History: 259–267.		
2014	How a Map Works	Pinsker, Sarah (June 2014). "How a Map Works". The Journal of Unlikely Cartography (9): 5–13.		
2014	The Sewell Home for the Temporally Displaced	Pinsker, Sarah (June 2014). "The Sewell Home for the Temporally Displaced". Lightspeed (49).		
2014	The Low Hum of Her	Pinsker, Sarah (August 2014). "The low hum of her". Asimov's Science Fiction. 38 (8): 70–73.	Merriam, Joanne, ed. (2015). How to live on other planets : a handbook for aspiring aliens. Upper Rubber Boot Books.	
2014	No Lonely Seafarer	Pinsker, Sarah (September 2014). "No Lonely Seafarer". Lightspeed (52).		
2014	Notes to My Past and/or Alternate Selves	Pinsker, Sarah (November 2014). "Notes To My Past And/Or Alternate Selves". Unidentified Funny Objects 3.		
2015	Beauty & the Baby Beast	Pinsker, Sarah (January 2015). "Beauty & the Baby Beast". Daily Science Fiction: 9–11.		
2015	Songs in the Key of You	Pinsker, Sarah (January 2015). "Songs in the Key of You". Asimov's Science Fiction. 39 (1): 65–68.		
2015	When the Circus Lights Down	Pinsker, Sarah (March–April 2015). "When the Circus Lights Down". Uncanny Magazine (3).		
2015	Last Thursday at Supervillain Supply Depot	Pinsker, Sarah (April 2015). "Last Thursday at Supervillain Supply Depot". Daily Science Fiction: 10–12.		
2015	Remembery Day	Pinsker, Sarah (May 2015). "Remembery Day". Apex (72).		
2015	Today's Smarthouse in Love	Pinsker, Sarah (May–June 2015). "Today's Smarthouse in Love". F&SF. 128 (5&6): 49–54.		
2015	Our Lady of the Open Road	Pinsker, Sarah (June 2015). "Our Lady of the Open Road". Asimov's Science Fiction. 39 (6): 84–105.		Novelette
2015	In the Dawns Between Hours	Pinsker, Sarah (June 2015). "In the Dawns Between Hours". Lightspeed (61).		
2015	Pay Attention	Pinsker, Sarah (July 2015). "Pay Attention". Accessing the Future.		
2015	And We Were Left Darkling	Pinsker, Sarah (August 2015). "And We Were Left Darkling". Lightspeed (63).		
2015	What Wags the World	Pinsker, Sarah (November 2015). "What Wags the World". Daily Science Fiction: 16.		
2016	Sooner or Later Everything Falls into the Sea	Pinsker, Sarah (February 2016). "Sooner or Later Everything Falls into the Sea". Lightspeed (69).		
2016	The Mountains His Crown	Pinsker, Sarah (March 2016). "The Mountains His Crown". Beneath Ceaseless Skies (195).		
2016	Left the Century to Sit Unmoved	Pinsker, Sarah (May 16, 2016). "Left the Century to Sit Unmoved". Strange Horizons.		
2016	Clearance	Pinsker, Sarah (June 2016). "Clearance". Asimov's Science Fiction. 40 (6): 16–21.		
2016	Down Beneath the Bridge Yet Unbuilt	Pinsker, Sarah (August 2018). "Down Beneath the Bridge Yet Unbuilt". Shattered Prism (2).		
2016	Talking to Dead People	Pinsker, Sarah (September–October 2016). "Talking to Dead People". F&SF. 131 (3&4): 7–18.		
2016	Under One Roof	Pinsker, Sarah (September–October 2016). "Under One Roof". Uncanny Magazine (12).		
2016	A Song Transmuted	Pinsker, Sarah (November 2016). "A Song Transmuted". Cyber World. Hex Publishers.		
2017	The Ones Who Know Where They Are Going	Pinsker, Sarah (March 2017). "The Ones Who Know Where They Are Going". Asimov's Science Fiction. 41 (3&4): 67–69.		
2017	And Then There Were (N-One)	Pinsker, Sarah (March–April 2017). "And Then There Were (N-One)". Uncanny Magazine (15): 49–97.		
2017	The Smoke Means It's Working	Pinsker, Sarah (May 2017). "The Smoke Means It's Working". Behind the Mask: An Anthology of Heroic Proportions. Meerkat Press.		
2017	Wind Will Rove	Pinsker, Sarah (September–October 2017). "Wind will rove". Asimov's Science Fiction. 41 (9&10): 14–36.		Link
2017	Remember This for Me	Pinsker, Sarah (November 2017). "Remember This for Me". Catalysts, Explorers & Secret Keepers: Women of Science Fiction. Museum of Science Fiction.		
2018	The Court Magician	Pinsker, Sarah (January 2018). "The Court Magician". Lightspeed.		
2018	Do As I Do, Sing As I Sing	Pinsker, Sarah (March 2018). "Do As I Do, Sing As I Sing". Beneath Ceaseless Skies (246).		
2018	I Frequently Hear Music in the Very Heart of Noise	Pinsker, Sarah (March–April 2018). "I Frequently Hear Music in the Very Heart of Noise". Uncanny Magazine (21).		
2018	Escape from Caring Seasons	Pinsker, Sarah (May 2018). "Escape from Caring Seasons". Twelve Tomorrows: 157–180.		
2018	Lost and Found	Pinsker, Sarah (December 2018). "Lost and Found". Whose Future Is It?.		
2019	That Our Flag Was Still There	Pinsker, Sarah (March 2019). "That Our Flag Was Still There". If This Goes On. Parvus Press.		
2019	The Narwhal	Pinsker, Sarah (March 2019). "The Narwhal". Sooner or Later Everything Falls into the Sea.		
2019	Everything is Closed Today	Pinsker, Sarah (May 21, 2019). "Everything is Closed Today". Do Not Go Quietly.		
2019	The Blur in the Corner of Your Eye	Pinsker, Sarah (July–August 2019). "The Blur in the Corner of Your Eye". Uncanny Magazine (29).		
2020	La Mer Donne	Pinsker, Sarah (March 2020). "La Mer Donne". Avatars Inc.		
2020	Bigger Fish	Pinsker, Sarah (March 2020). "Bigger Fish". Made to Order.		
2020	Notice	Pinsker, Sarah (June 2020). "Notice". Us in Flux.		
2020	Two Truths and a Lie	Pinsker, Sarah (June 17, 2020). "Two Truths and a Lie". Tor.com.		
2020	Tru Luv	Pinsker, Sarah (December 2020). "Tru Love". Escape Pod (765).		
2021	Where Oaken Hearts Do Gather	Pinsker, Sarah (March–April 2021). "Where Oaken Hearts Do Gather". Uncanny Magazine (39).		
2021	A Better Way of Saying	Pinsker, Sarah (November 10, 2021). "A Better Way of Saying". Tor.com.		

———————

Bibliography notes
