= Das Steingeschöpf =

Work of fiction

- Short story by G.V. Anderson
- Country: United Kingdom
- Language: English
- Genre: Short Fiction

Publication
- Publisher: Strange Horizons
- Publication date: 12 December 2016

Das Steingeschöpf is a short fiction written by G. V. Anderson. It was her first professional short story and won the World Fantasy Award for Best Short Fiction in 2017. G. V. Anderson was born in 1990 and lives in Dorset, the south coast of England.

== Plot summary ==
The story is about Hertzel, a young stone restorationist, who just finished his apprenticeship and received his first job assignment from Frau Leitner, a German lady, to repair a stone statue.

He made the journey from Berlin to Bavaria by train and arrived Frau Leitner’s chalet very late at night. He found out that she was an older woman with a bad cough. He anxiously asked Frau Leitner to show him the Steingeschöpf that needed restoration and they went upstairs to the attic. Hertzel was astonished when he discovered that stone creature named "Ambroise" was carved in Queckstein by De Loynes, the Great French Master in the 17th century. He suddenly felt inadequate and was afraid he was not up to the task. There was also danger in working with the Queckstein as its dust could destroy the lungs. He tried to refuse the job but Frau Leitner talked him into it.

The story also shows the affection between Ambroise and Frau Leitner, and how little time they had left.
