= Nebula Awards Showcase 2012 =

2012 anthology edited by James Patrick Kelly and John Kessel

- Cover of first edition
- Editors: James Patrick Kelly, John Kessel
- Cover artist: Michael Whelan
- Language: English
- Series: Nebula Awards Showcase
- Genre: Science fiction
- Publisher: Pyr
- Publication date: 2012
- Publication place: United States
- Media type: Print (paperback)
- Pages: 335
- ISBN: 978-1-61614-619-1
- OCLC: 767564258
- Preceded by: The Nebula Awards Showcase 2011
- Followed by: Nebula Awards Showcase 2013

Nebula Awards Showcase 2012 is an anthology of science fiction short works edited by James Patrick Kelly and John Kessel. It was first published in trade paperback by Pyr in May 2012.

== Summary ==
The book collects pieces that won or were nominated for the Nebula Awards for best novel, novella, novelette and short story for the year 2011, as well as the novel that won the Andre Norton Award for that year, an early story by James Tiptree, Jr., nonfiction pieces related to the awards, and the three Rhysling Award and Dwarf Stars Award-winning poems for 2010, together with an introduction by the editors, short introductions to each piece by their authors, and "About the author" postscripts to each piece. The pieces winning the Best Novel and Andre Norton awards are represented by excerpts. Not all nominees for the various awards are included.

== Contents ==
- "In Which Your Editors Consider the Nebula Awards of Yesterday, Today, and Tomorrow" [introduction] (James Patrick Kelly and John Kessel)
- "Ponies" [Best Short Story co-winner, 2011] (Kij Johnson)
- "The Sultan of the Clouds" [Best Novella nominee, 2011] (Geoff Landis)
- "Map of Seventeen" [Best Novelette nominee, 2011] (Chris Barzak)
- "And I Awoke and Found Me Here on the Cold Hill's Side" [short story] (James Tiptree Jr.)
- "In the Astronaut Asylum" [Rhysling Award for Long Poem winner, 2010] (Samantha Henderson and Kendall Evans)
- "Pishaach" [Best Novelette nominee, 2011] (Shweta Narayan)
- "Excerpt from Blackout/All Clear [Best Novel winner, 2011] (Connie Willis)
- "Bumbershoot" [Dwarf Stars Award winner, 2010] (Howard Hendrix)
- "Arvies" [Best Short Story nominee, 2011] (Adam Troy-Castro)
- "How Interesting: A Tiny Man" [Best Short Story co-winner, 2011] (Harlan Ellison)
- "The Jaguar House, in Shadow" [Best Novelette nominee, 2011] (Aliette de Bodard)
- "The Green Book" [Best Short Story nominee, 2011] (Amal El-Mohtar)
- "That Leviathan, Whom Thou Hast Made" [Best Novelette winner, 2011] (Eric James Stone)
- "Excerpt from I Shall Wear Midnight [Andre Norton Award winner, 2011] (Terry Pratchett)
- "To Theia" [Rhysling Award for Short Poem winner, 2010] (Ann K. Schwader)
- "The Lady Who Plucked Red Flowers Beneath the Queen's Window" [Best Novella winner, 2011] (Rachel Swirsky)
- "2011 Nebula Awards Nominees and Honorees" [essay]
- "Past Nebula Winners" [essay]
- "About the Cover" [essay]
- "About the Editors" [essay]

== Reception ==
Publishers Weekly calls the book a "remarkable anthology ... filled with the very best of the SF and fantasy published in 2010," in which "all the inclusions are outstanding works of fiction." The reviewer notes that "Readers will savor the writing of such well-known authors as Connie Willis ... and Kij Johnson ... as well as relative newcomers like Amal El-Mohtar .. and Rachel Swirsky.

Kirkus Reviews judges the period represented "[n]ot a banner year, all things considered, with greatest likely appeal to the younger section of the audience." The pieces by Johnson, Ellison, Stone, Swirsky, Willis, Pratchett and Tiptree receive individual comment, but praise is limited to those of Johnson, Stone, and Tiptree. Swirsky's contribution is panned for "its staccato pacing and unfinished air." Overall the pieces are found "too often pallid, especially—perhaps unfairly—contrasted with a true heavyweight champion like Tiptree." The reviewer feels the book's "greatest likely appeal" would be "to the younger section of the audience."

Ryder Miller in the Portland Book Review thinks "[r]eaders may find the showcase varied or uneven," but "[d]espite the strange, challenging, experimental story or something else that one may not appreciate, upon finishing the collection, one is likely to experience a profound longing for more." While noting the presence of pieces "by some of the field's top luminaries [and] also many newer writers," he laments "the passing on of the old guard" and the lack of "articles and non-fiction commentary" featured "in years past."

The anthology was also reviewed by Jim Davis in SFRA Review no. 301, Summer 2012.
