= Sinner, Baker, Fabulist, Priest; Red Mask, Black Mask, Gentleman, Beast =

Novelette by Eugie Foster

"Sinner, Baker, Fabulist, Priest; Red Mask, Black Mask, Gentleman, Beast" is a 2009 science fiction novelette by American writer Eugie Foster. It was first published in Interzone, and has subsequently been republished in Apex Magazine, in The Nebula Awards Showcase 2011, and in The Mammoth Book of Nebula Awards SF; as well, it has been translated into Czech, French, Italian, Spanish, Romanian, and Hungarian, and an audio version was released on Escape Pod.

== Synopsis ==
In a world where people's roles, identities, and personalities all depend on which mask they wear on any given day, one man discovers the concept of rebellion.

== Reception ==
"Sinner, Baker" won the 2010 Nebula Award for Best Novelette, and was nominated for the 2009 BSFA Award for Best Short Fiction and the 2010 Hugo Award for Best Novelette.

Gardner Dozois considered it an "elegantly strange slipstreamish fantasy". Jason Sanford described it as "beautifully written and fast-paced", while Rachel Swirsky called it a "mix of high concept and colorful images". Tangent Online rated it three stars, while Black Gate commended Foster for producing an ending which goes counter to readers' expectations.
