= When It Ends, He Catches Her =

2014 short story by Eugie Foster

"When It Ends, He Catches Her" is a 2014 science fiction short story by Eugie Foster. It was first published on Daily Science Fiction, on September 26, 2014—the day before Foster's death. An audio version (read by Tina Connolly) was subsequently made available via Pseudopod, and the story was included in the 2015 Long List Anthology: More Stories from the Hugo Awards Nomination List and Nebula Awards Showcase 2016.

== Synopsis ==
Before civilization fell to a plague of zombies, Aisa was a ballet dancer. Now, she spends her time in an abandoned theater, dancing on an abandoned stage for an imaginary audience.

== Reception ==
"Catches" was nominated for the 2015 Theodore Sturgeon Award and the 2014 Nebula Award for Best Short Story; Ursula Vernon, who won that award instead, has stated that she had expected "Catches" would win. Jason Sanford called it "a beautiful elegy on life and death", and "both touching and disturbing."

As well, analysis of the nominations for the 2015 Hugo Awards has shown that, if it were not for the involvement of the Sad Puppies, "Catches" would have been a finalist for the Hugo Award for Best Short Story.
