= Nick Lowe (disambiguation) =

Nick Lowe (born 1949), is an English singer-songwriter, musician and producer.

Nick Lowe may also refer to:

- Nick Lowe (classicist) (born 1956), British classical scholar and film critic
- Nick Lowe (comics) (born 1979), American comics editor

== See also ==
- Nicholas Low (1739–1826), American merchant and developer
