= UWB =

UWB may refer to:

- Ultra-wideband, a very wide band radio technology
- University of Washington Bothell, Washington, United States
- University of West Bohemia, Czech Republic
