= Jason Sanford =

American science fiction author

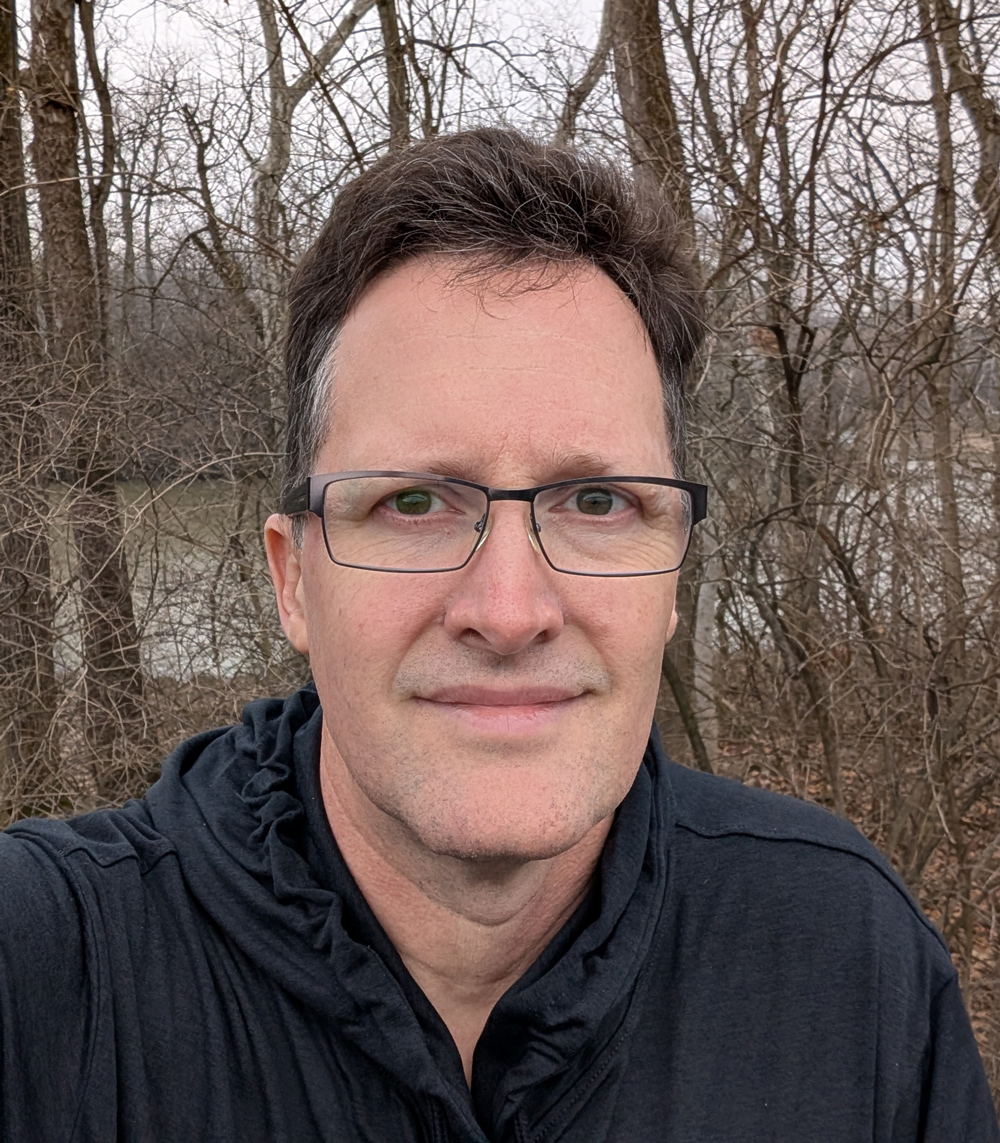
- Sanford in 2025
- Born: Alabama, United States
- Education: Auburn University
- Occupation: Writer
- Writing career
- Genre: Science fiction
- Website: www.jasonsanford.com

Jason Sanford is an American science fiction author whose 2022 novel Plague Birds was a finalist for the Nebula and Philip K. Dick Awards. He's also known for his short fiction, which has been published in Interzone, Asimov's Science Fiction, Analog Science Fiction and Fact, Year's Best SF 14, InterGalactic Medicine Show and other magazines and anthologies.

Sanford is a three-time winner of the Interzone Readers' Poll and a multiple finalist for the Nebula Award in the short fiction categories of novella, novelette, and short story. Interzone published a special issue on his fiction in 2010. He is also a multiple finalist for the Hugo Award for Best Fan Writer. His fiction has been reprinted into a number of languages, including Czech, French, Russian, and Chinese. He also founded the literary magazine storySouth and ran their annual Million Writers Award for best online short stories.

== Life ==
Sanford was born in Alabama and raised outside of Wetumpka. He attended Auburn University, where he studied anthropology and archaeology. After college Sanford served for two years as a Peace Corps Volunteer in Thailand, where he taught English in a junior high school. He also met his wife, a fellow Peace Corps Volunteer, while in Thailand. After the Peace Corps they moved to Minneapolis, where Sanford worked as an editor.

== Editing career ==
In 2001 Sanford, along with poet Jake Adam York, founded the literary magazine storySouth, which focuses on literature from the "New South." One of the early journals of the online literature movement, works published in storySouth have been reprinted in anthologies such as Best American Poetry 2008, Best of the Web 2008, and e2ink: The Best of the Online Journals, and have won a number of awards and honors. Sanford served as the fiction and nonfiction editor, while York served as poetry editor. Both editors were heavily involved in the debate around the alleged plagiarism of Southern author Brad Vice, with Sanford defending Vice's work and his essays on the affair being mentioned in the subsequent press coverage.

Sanford turned over publication of storySouth to Spring Garden Press in 2009 and now serves as Editor Emeritus for the journal. In 2004, Sanford started the storySouth Million Writers Award, which highlighted each year's best online short stories. In 2012 he edited two anthologies of stories from the Million Writers Award.

== Writing career ==
Sanford is best known as a science fiction author, although he also writes fantasy and has been published in other literary genres. His fiction has been described as "new weird SF", and compared to both the anime of Hayao Miyazaki and the early writings of Brian Aldiss. Sanford has described his writings and those of others as part of an emergent storytelling form called SciFi Strange, "which sets high literary standards, experiments with style, is infused with a sense of wonder, takes the idea of diverse sexuality for granted, focuses on human values and needs and explores the boundaries of reality and experience through philosophical speculation."

Sanford's science fiction and fantasy has been published in Interzone, Analog Science Fiction and Fact, Year's Best SF 14, InterGalactic Medicine Show, Tales of the Unanticipated, and other magazines and anthologies. His non-genre works have been published in The Mississippi Review, Diagram, Pindeldyboz, and other places. He is a three-time winner of the Interzone Readers' Poll and a three-time finalist for the Nebula Awards. He has also received a Minnesota State Arts Board Fellowship and been nominated for the BSFA Award, the British Fantasy Award, and the Pushcart Prize. SF critic and reviewer Patrick Wolohan named Sanford to his list of 25 authors worth watching in 2010 and beyond.

His critical essays and book reviews have been published in The New York Review of Science Fiction, The Pedestal Magazine, and The Fix Short Fiction Review. Among Sanford's more influential essays is "Who Wears Short Shorts? Micro Stories and MFA Disgust", which ripped both the claimed incestuous nature of Master of Fine Arts programs and flash fiction. The essay prompted a large amount of online discussion on the merits of Sanford's claims.

Apex Publications released Sanford's first novel Plague Birds in 2022. The novel was selected as a finalist for both the Nebula Award for Best Novel and Philip K. Dick Awards. Publishers Weekly called Plague Birds "something like The Wizard of Oz as retold by A.E. van Vogt." Maurice Broaddus called the novel "a perfect blend of sf and fantasy weaving memory, loss, technology, and family into a wholly unique tapestry that left me turning the pages just to see what he would do next."

== Bibliography ==
=== Novels ===
- Plague Birds, Apex Books, 2022.

=== Short fiction ===
==== Collections ====
- Never Never Stories - Short story collection, Spotlight Publishing, 2011.

==== Anthologies (edited) ====
- Million Writers Award: The Best Online Science Fiction and Fantasy - (edited), anthology of short fiction, Spotlight Publishing, 2012.
- Million Writers Award: The Best New Online Voices - (edited), anthology of short fiction, Spotlight Publishing, 2012.

==== List of stories ====
Title	Year	First published	Reprinted/collected	Notes
Monday's Monk	2013	Sanford, Jason (March 2013). "Monday's Monk". Asimov's Science Fiction. 37 (3): 54–67.		Novelette
What Is Sand But Earth Purified?	2014	Sanford, Jason (October–November 2014). "What Is Sand But Earth Purified?". Asimov's Science Fiction. 38 (10–11): 134–146.		

- "Sublimation Angels" (published in Interzone). Finalist, Nebula Award for Best Novella, 2009.
- "Blood Grains Speak Through Memories" (published by Beneath Ceaseless Skies). Finalist, Nebula Award for Best Novelette, 2016.
- "The Eight-Thousanders" (published in Asimov's Science Fiction). Finalist, Nebula Award for Best Short Story, 2020.
