= 2014 University of West Bohemia Rector election =

← 2010	19 November 2014	2018 →
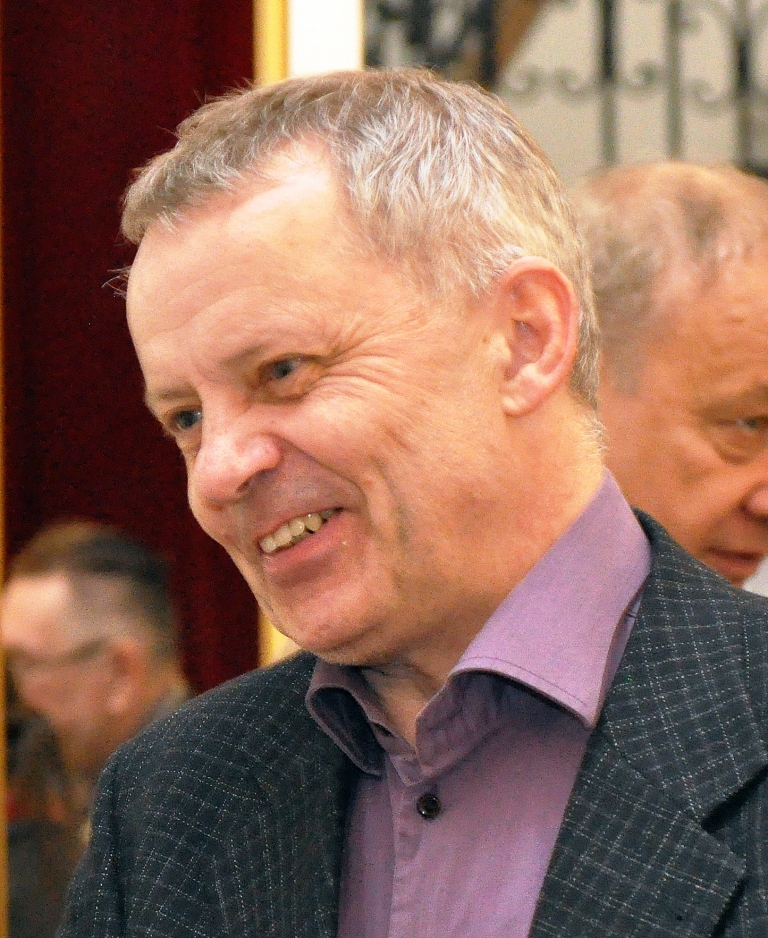

Candidate	Miroslav Holeček	Ilona Mauritzová
Electoral vote	32	26
Percentage	54.2%	44.1%
Rector before election
Ilona Mauritzová
Elected Rector
Miroslav Holeček

The University of West Bohemia Rector election, 2014 was held on 19 November 2014. The incumbent Rector Ilona Mauritzová sought reelection but was defeated by Chairman of the Research Center New Technologies Miroslav Holeček.

== Candidates ==
- Ladislav Čepička, Vice-dean at the Faculty of Education.
- Nikolaj Demjančuk, Chairman of Catedra of Philosophy at the Faculty Philosophy and Arts
- Miroslav Holeček, Chairman of Research Center NTC. He ran for the position in 2010 but was defeated by Mauritzová.
- Ilona Mauritzová, the incumbent Rector. She was previously Dean of The Faculty of Health Care Studies. She is the first female Rector of the University.

== Background ==
Candidates were allowed to register till 27 September 2014. Incumbent Rector Ilona Mauritzová decided to seek reelection. Her rival from previous election Miroslav Holeček also decided to run. Ladislav Čepička from faculty of Education and Nikolaj Demjančuk from the Faculty Philosophy and Arts also decided to stand.

The first debate was held on 22 October 2014. Holeček stated that vision is a key for the University. He believes that University should know its direction. He wants it to have a good name and use its inner diversity and cooperation of faculties to its benefit. Mauritzová stated that university should consolidate itself and should focus on its strategic goals in the new period. Demjančuk supported stronger autonomy of faculties. Čepička wanted the university step from average.

== Opinion Survey ==
Date	Poll	Holeček	Mauritzová	Čepička	Demjančuk
7 October - 19 November 2014	Dioné	35%	33%	23%	9%

== Voting ==
Candidate	1st Round		2nd Round	
Mauritzová	24	40.68%	26	44.07%
Holeček	21	35.59%	32	54.24%
Čepička	10	16.95%		
Demjančuk	0	0%		
Invalid	4	6.78%	1	1.69%

Voting was held on 19 November 2014. 59 members of academic senate voted. Candidate needed to win at least 30 votes to be elected. Mauritzová received highest number of votes in the first round. Holeček also advanced to the second round. Second round was held afterwards. Holeček defeated Mautzová when he received 32 votes.

== Aftermath ==
Czech president Miloš Zeman appointed Holeček on 5 February 2015. Holeček was inaugurated on 2 April 2015 and became the new Rector.

Mauritzová returned to the Faculty of Health Care Studies and became its dean.
