= Brad Vice =

American writer

- Born: November 14, 1973 (age 52); Tuscaloosa, AL, U.S.
- Education: University of Cincinnati (Ph.D., 2001); University of Tennessee (M.A., 1997)
- Occupation: English Language Professor
- Writing career
- Years active: 2001–2004
- Notable awards: Flannery O'Connor Award for Short Fiction *Rescinded for plagiarism

Brad Vice (born November 14, 1973) is an English language and composition professor at the University of West Bohemia. He grew up in Alabama. His short story collection, The Bear Bryant Funeral Train, won the Flannery O'Connor Award for Short Fiction from the University of Georgia Press, but the award was later rescinded and the book recalled after portions of the story were alleged to be plagiarized from an earlier work by Carl Carmer.

== Biography ==
Vice was born in Tuscaloosa, Alabama, in 1973, and raised in nearby Northport. Vice's father, Leon Vice, was a high school history teacher and a farmer while his mother Dorothy was a radiology technician.

He received his master's degree from the University of Tennessee and Ph.D. from The University of Cincinnati. During a brief stint working at Mississippi State University as a professor, Vice published his doctoral thesis as a standalone work. Shortly after it won the Flannery O'Connor Award for Short Fiction, a librarian at the Tuscaloosa Public Library noted that "plot, language and even the title of his first short story" had been lifted from a story by Carl Carmer titled "Stars Fell on Alabama". Vice lost his job at Mississippi State, as well as his award from the University of Georgia, and his Ph.D. from Cincinnati was called into question.

Vice is currently serving as an instructor at the University of West Bohemia in Plzeň in the Czech Republic.

== The Bear Bryant Funeral Train ==
In late 2004, Vice's short story collection, The Bear Bryant Funeral Train, won the Flannery O'Connor Short Fiction Award from the University of Georgia Press. The Press published the collection in late 2005. Kirkus Reviews, in a starred review, called it "distinguished and disturbing work, from a lavishly gifted new writer." Publishers Weekly agreed: "Vice has a gift for making the extraordinary plausible, for rendering complex motivations in spare but metaphoric language and searing details."

When the University of Georgia Press discovered that one of the stories in The Bear Bryant Funeral Train incorporated material from a short story by Carl Carmer, the Press accused Vice of plagiarism, revoked the Flannery O'Connor Short Fiction Award, and destroyed unsold copies of the book.

Science fiction author Jason Sanford defended Vice in the quarterly journal storySouth, describing the affair as a "literary lynching". A number of other writers and editors came to Vice's defense. Jake Adam York, a founding editor of storySouth, noted that Vice had allowed his short story and the four-page section of Carmer's original book to be published side by side in Thicket, a journal edited by York. To York, this action by Vice "implicitly acknowledges the relationship (and) allows the evidence to be made public." York added that doing this allowed the readers to enter the "intertextual space in which (Vice) has worked" and that what Vice was doing with his story was allusion, not plagiarism. York also stated that, according to his own analysis of Vice's story and Carmer's source material, Vice did not break copyright law.

After Vice's book was destroyed, remaining used copies on Amazon.com and other booksellers were selling for hundreds of dollars.

In late March 2007, a new edition of the collection was published by River City Publishing. According to a report in The Oxford American, "The revised version will more closely mirror Vice's 2001 dissertation from the University of Cincinnati, which contained many of the stories that ended up being published as The Bear Bryant Funeral Train. Unlike the UGA Press edition, it will be divided into two sections, the latter of which is set entirely in Tuscaloosa".

Vice previously published some of the short stories from The Bear Bryant Funeral Train in various fiction journals, and his story "Report from Junction" (published in The Atlantic Monthly in 2002) was selected by Katrina Kenison in her list of "Other Distinguished Stories" in The Best American Short Stories 2003. One of the stories previously published in Shenandoah in 2005 has been a subject of scholarly study.

== Qworty victim ==
In May 2013, Salon.com reporter Andrew Leonard revealed that Brad Vice had been the victim of a "ferocious assault" by Robert Clark Young, a writer who spent years anonymously attacking his literary enemies by inserting "revenge edits" into Wikipedia. Editing under the user name "Qworty", Young "devoted a significant amount of intellectual and emotional energy to attacking not only Vice, but the entire community of writers centered around the Sewanee Writers' Conference that had nurtured Vice."
