= Interzone: The 1st Anthology =

Anthology

First edition (publ. J. M. Dent)

Interzone: The 1st Anthology is an anthology published in 1985.

== Plot summary ==
Interzone: The 1st Anthology is a collection of fiction previously published in the British magazine Interzone.

== Reception ==
Dave Langford reviewed Interzone: the 1st Anthology for White Dwarf #65, and stated that "Interzone can also make hugely exciting and ambitious mistakes, but they too are vital. About the most powerful of these 13 stories (12 reprint, 1 new) was the most hated in a readership poll. If you haven't seen IZ, buy this - act without thinking - and use the subscription form provided within."

== Reviews ==
- Review by Faren Miller (1985) in Locus, #291 April 1985
- Review by Edward James (1985) in Vector 126
- Review by Brian Stableford (1985) in Foundation, #34 Autumn 1985
- Review by Michael M. Levy (1986) in Fantasy Review, May 1986
- Review by Algis Budrys (1987) in The Magazine of Fantasy & Science Fiction, January 1987
