= If You Were a Dinosaur, My Love =

- Short story by Rachel Swirsky
- Country: United States
- Language: English
- Genre(s): Speculative fiction

Publication
- Published in: Apex Magazine
- Published in English: 2013

"If You Were a Dinosaur, My Love" is a short story by American writer Rachel Swirsky. It was first published in Apex Magazine in 2013.

== Synopsis ==
As a paleontologist lies in a coma, his fiancée tells him how things would be different if he were a Tyrannosaurus rex.

== Reception ==
"If You Were a Dinosaur, My Love" won the 2013 Nebula Award for Best Short Story, and was nominated for the 2014 Hugo Award for Best Short Story. At Kirkus Reviews, critic Ana Grilo describes it as "beautiful", "powerful", and "intense", and "almost like a piece of poetry", but questions whether it can truly be considered speculative fiction.

The story was at the center of the Sad Puppies controversy; it was held up as an example of "message fiction" by its detractors, symptomatic of a clique of social justice ideologues who they said were controlling the awards. It was strongly criticized by Sad Puppies-involved authors such as John C. Wright and Sarah Hoyt.
