= Carl Carmer =

American writer (1893–1976)

- Born: Carl Lamson Carmer; October 16, 1893; Cortland, New York, U.S.
- Died: September 11, 1976 (aged 82); Bronxville, New York, U.S.
- Education: Albion High School
- Alma mater: Hamilton College (BA); Harvard (MA)
- Occupations: Author, teacher, and editor
- Spouse: Elizabeth Black (m. 1928)
- Writing career
- Notable works: Deep South; Stars Fell on Alabama; Listen for a Lonesome Drum

Carl Lamson Carmer (October 16, 1893 – September 11, 1976) was an American writer of nonfiction books, memoirs, and novels, many of which focused on American myths, folklore, and tales. His most famous book, Stars Fell on Alabama, was an autobiographical story of the time he spent living in Alabama. He was considered one of America's most popular writers during the 1940s and 1950s.

== Early life ==
Carmer was born in Cortland, New York. His father, Willis Griswold Carmer, was the principal of Dansville High School. His mother, Mary Lamson Carmer, grew up on a farm in Dryden, New York.

When he was five his father became principal of Albion High School in Albion, New York, which is in western New York. He graduated from Albion High School in 1910 and entered his father's alma mater, Hamilton College, where he earned his undergraduate degree. He subsequently received a master's degree from Harvard.

== Career ==
=== Teaching ===
Carmer taught briefly at Syracuse University before accepting a position at the University of Alabama in 1921, where he taught until 1927. He also became an assistant editor at Vanity Fair. In his later years, Carmer would work as a folklore consultant for Walt Disney Productions and produce a folklore radio series called "Your Neck o' the Woods." He also produced four albums of regional songs.

=== Writing ===
==== Stars Fell on Alabama ====
When Carmer arrived in Tuscaloosa, Alabama, one of his new colleagues warned him, "...if I knew you well enough to advise you, I'd say, 'For God's sake, get out of here before it's too late.'" This reference was evidently about the state of Alabama's racial relations at the time. Carmer, however, stayed at the University for six years, taking notes and writing what would become his most famous book, Stars Fell on Alabama.

In the book, Carmer recounted the time he spent traveling throughout the state. He wrote about the people, places, and events he witnessed, such as a Ku Klux Klan rally and interactions with ordinary Alabama men and women.

One example of the book's prose was this description of a Sacred Harp singing:

The church was full now. People stood along the walls and the doorway was packed. Crowds were huddled outside each window singing lustily...there were surely more than two thousand people...Hard blows of sound beat upon the walls and rafters with inexorable regularity. All in a moment the constant beat took hold. There was a swift crescendo. Muscles were tensing, eyes brightening.

Carmer also wrote about the myths, legends, and local superstitions of what he called "Conjure Country" (which was his nickname for southeast Alabama). He credited folklorist Ruby Pickens Tartt with providing some of the folklore and songs for this book, and he based the character Mary Louise on her.

First published in 1934, Stars Fell on Alabama hit the bestseller lists and established Carmer's reputation. Literary critic R. L. Duffus of The New York Times praised the book and said Carmer had a gift for "extracting from what he sees, hears and feels an essence which is fundamentally poetic." The book has been subsequently republished a number of times, most recently in 2000 with a new introduction by Howell Raines.

The title of the book referred to a spectacular occurrence of the Leonid meteor shower that was observed in Alabama on November 12–13, 1833. As reported by the Florence Gazette: "[There were] thousands of luminous bodies shooting across the firmament in every direction. There was little wind and not a trace of clouds, and the meteors succeeded each other in quick succession."

Sections of Carmer's book were adapted by Brad Vice in his short story "The Bear Bryant Funeral Train." His failure to acknowledge his debt to Carmer led the organizers of the Flannery O'Connor Award for Short Fiction to revoke the prize he was given in 2004.

==== Other writings and projects ====
After the success of Stars Fell on Alabama, Carmer returned to the upstate New York region he had grown up in. He documented the myths and stories of the region, including the Cardiff Giant hoax, and wrote a new book, Listen for a Lonesome Drum. He followed this up with a sequel in 1949, Dark Trees to the Wind.

In 1939 Carmer wrote a well-received volume in the Rivers of America Series, The Hudson River. In 1942 he became the Editor for the Rivers of America Series, edited The Songs of the Rivers of America (1942) and wrote The Susquehanna (1955). In all, Carmer wrote 37 books. He was considered one of America's most popular writers during the 1940s and 1950s.

== Personal life and death ==
Carmer married artist Elizabeth Black on December 24, 1928. He died on September 11, 1976, in Bronxville, New York.

== Bibliography ==
- College English Composition; A Handbook of Writing and Speech, Including Both the General Principles of Composition and the Essential Details of Good Usage (Richmond, Johnson Pub. Co., 1927) with Edwin Francis Shewmake
- French Town (New Orleans, Quarter's Book Shop, 1928)
- Deep South (New York, Farrar & Rinehart, 1930)
- Stars Fell on Alabama (New York, Farrar & Rinehart, 1934)
- Listen for a Lonesome Drum; A York State Chronicle (New York, Farrar & Rinehart, 1936)
- The Hurricane's Children: Tales from Your Neck o' the Woods (New York, Farrar & Rinehart, 1937)
- The Hudson (New York, Farrar & Rinehart, 1939)
- Genesee Fever (New York, Farrar & Rinehart, 1941) [Novel]
- America Sings [editor] (New York, Knopf, 1942)
- War Against God (New York, Henry Holt & Co., 1943)
- Taps Is Not Enough (New York, Henry Holt, 1945)
- Wildcat Furs to China: The Cruise of the Sloop Experiment (New York, Alfred A. Knopf, 1945) [Juvenile Fiction]
- The Jesse James of the Java Sea (New York, Farrar & Rinehart, 1945)
- American Scriptures (New York, Boni & Gaer, 1946) with Carl Van Doren
- For the Rights of Men (New York, Hinds, Hayden & Eldredge, 1947)
- Eagle in the Wind (New York, Aladdin, 1948) [Juvenile Fiction]
- Hurricane Luck (New York, Aladdin, 1949) [Juvenile Fiction]
- Too Many Cherries (New York, Viking, 1949) [Juvenile Fiction]
- Dark Trees to the Wind; A Cycle of York State Years (New York, William Sloane Associates, 1949)
- Windfall Fiddle (New York, Alfred A. Knopf, 1950) [Juvenile Fiction]
- The Susquehanna (New York, Rinehart & Company, 1955)
- The Screaming Ghost and Other Stories (New York, Alfred A. Knopf, 1956) [Juvenile Folklore]
- Pets at the White House (New York, E. P. Dutton, 1959) [Juvenile Non-fiction]
- Henry Hudson, Captain of Icebound Seas (Champaign, Ill., Garrard, 1960) [Juvenile Biography]
- Francis Marion, Swamp Fox of the Carolinas (Champaign, Ill., Garrard, 1962) with Elizabeth Carmer [Juvenile Biography]
- The Tavern Lamps Are Burning; Literary Journeys Through Six Regions and Four Centuries of New York State (New York, David McKay Company, 1964)
- Captain Abner and Henry Q. (Champaign, Ill., Garrard, 1965) with Elizabeth Carmer [Juvenile Fiction]
- Tony Beaver Griddle Skater (Champaign, Ill., Garrard, 1965) with Elizabeth Carmer [Juvenile Fiction]
- Mike Fink and the Big Turkey Shoot (Champaign, Ill., Garrard, 1965) with Elizabeth Carmer [Juvenile Fiction]
- My Kind of Country: Favorite Writings About New York (New York, David McKay Company, 1966)
- Pecos Bill and the Long Lasso (Champaign, Ill., Garrard, 1968) with Elizabeth Carmer [Juvenile Fiction]
- The Farm Boy and the Angel: The Mormon Vision and the Winning of the West (New York, Doubleday, 1970)
- The Boy Drummer of Vincennes (New York, Harvey House, 1972) [Juvenile Fiction]
- The Pirate Hero of New Orleans (New York, Harvey House, 1975) [Juvenile Fiction]
