= Jake Adam York =

American poet (1972–2012)

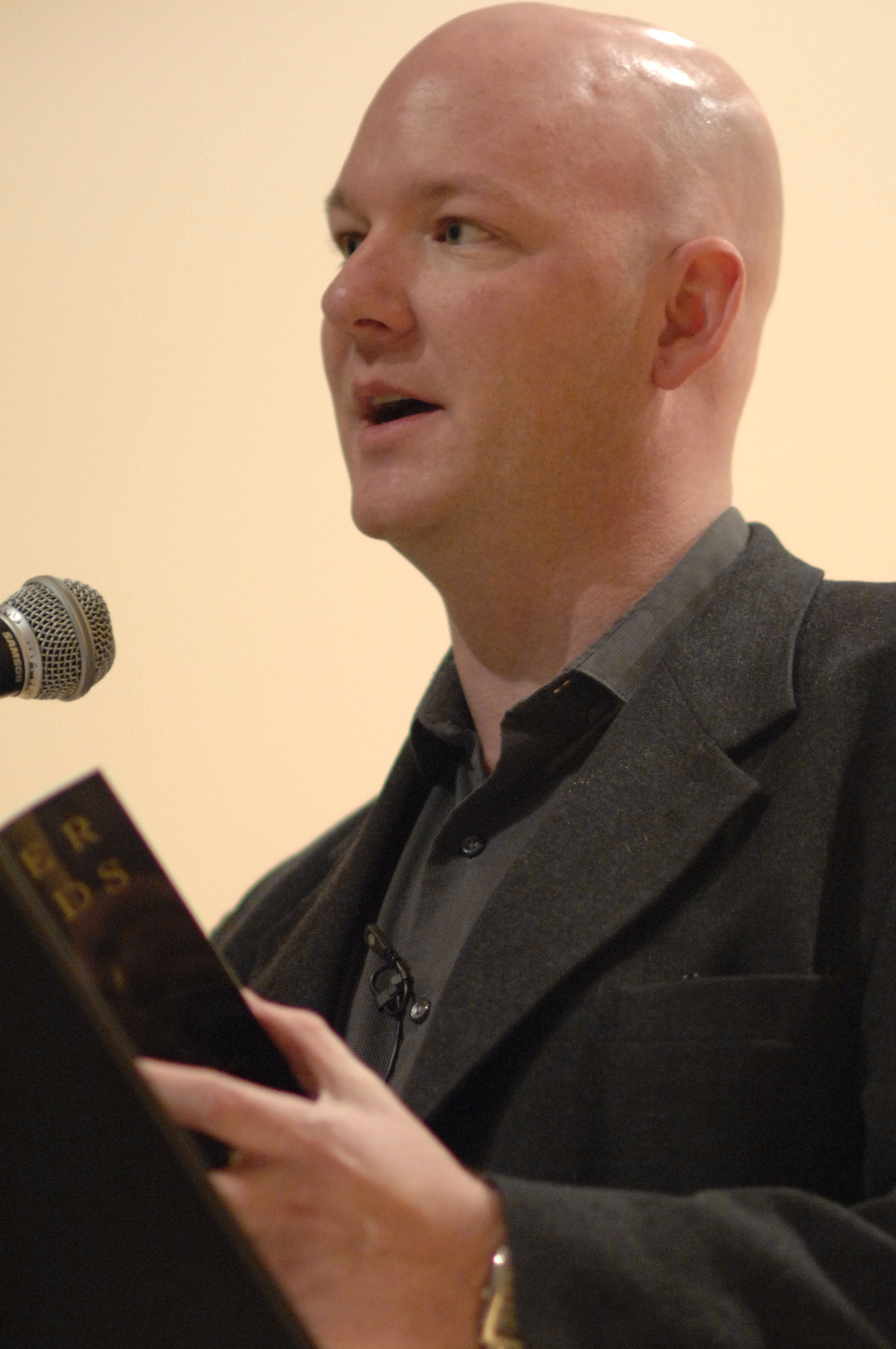
- York reading one of his poems in March 2007
- Born: August 10, 1972; West Palm Beach, Florida, U.S.
- Died: December 16, 2012 (aged 40); Denver, Colorado, U.S.
- Education: BA, Auburn University, MFA, Ph.D. Cornell University
- Occupations: Poet, professor, editor
- Spouse: Sarah Skeen
- Writing career
- Genre: Poetry
- Notable awards: Elixir Prize in Poetry; 2005; Crab Orchard Series in Poetry Open Competition Awards; 2007; Colorado Book Award; 2008; National Endowment for the Arts Creative Writing Fellowship; 2012; Witter Bynner Fellowship; 2014
- Website: jakeadamyork.com

Jake Adam York (August 10, 1972 – December 16, 2012) was an American poet. He published three books of poetry before his death: Murder Ballads, which won the 2005 Elixir Prize in Poetry; A Murmuration of Starlings, which won the 2008 Colorado Book Award in Poetry; and Persons Unknown, an editor's selection in the Crab Orchard Series in Poetry. A fourth book, Abide, was released posthumously, in 2014. That same year he was also named a posthumous recipient of the Witter Bynner Fellowship by the U.S. Poet Laureate.

== Life ==
York was born in West Palm Beach, Florida, in 1972 to David and Linda York, who worked respectively as a steelworker and history teacher. Shortly after York's birth, his parents moved with him back to Alabama, where five generations of their families had lived.

York grew up with his brother Joe in Gadsden, Alabama, where the family lived in a rural house. York was a big fan of rap music, including LL Cool J and Run DMC, and covered their joint bedroom in posters of his favorite rappers.

York graduated from Southside High School in Gadsden in 1990. That year he started at Auburn University. Initially an architecture student, he switched majors to English after attending a poetry reading with R. T. Smith, who was the university's Alumni Writer in Residence at the time. York eventually earned a B.A. in English. He received his M.F.A. and Ph.D. in creative writing and English literature from Cornell University.

== Career and editing ==
York worked as an associate professor at the University of Colorado Denver, where he was an editor for Copper Nickel, a nationally recognized student literary journal which he had helped found. In the spring of 2011, York was the Richard B. Thomas Visiting Professor of Creative Writing at Kenyon College. During the 2011–2012 academic year, he was a visiting faculty scholar at Emory University's James Weldon Johnson Institute for the Study of Race and Difference.

In addition, York served as a founding editor for storySouth and as a contributing editor for Shenandoah magazine. He also founded the online journal Thicket, which focused on Alabama literature.

In 2005, when fiction writer Brad Vice was accused of plagiarism in his short story collection The Bear Bryant Funeral Train, York took the lead in defending the author. Vice was accused of plagiarizing part of one story from the 1934 book Stars Fell on Alabama by Carl Carmer.

York noted that Vice had allowed the short story and the similar section from Carmer's original book to be published side by side in the literary journal Thicket. To York, Vice thus "implicitly acknowledges the relationship (and) allows the evidence to be made public". York added that doing this allowed the readers to enter the "intertextual space in which (Vice) has worked", and Vice was using allusion in his story, not plagiarism. York said that, according to his own analysis, Vice did not violate copyright law.

Vice's collection was republished two years later. York wrote one of the introductions to this new edition of The Bear Bryant Funeral Train.

== Poetry ==
York wrote what has been called "poetry of witness," in particular "to elegize and memorialize the martyrs of the Civil Rights movement. His poetry appeared in journals and magazines including The New York Times Magazine, The New Orleans Review, The Oxford American, Poetry Daily, Quarterly West, and The Southern Review.

York's first book of poems, Murder Ballads, won the 2005 Elixir Prize in Poetry. According to one reviewer, "Context matters, but good poetry is not bound by it. Jake Adam York's Murder Ballads — a collection of 35 poems in four parts, published by Elixir Press — is a book where context matters. But the finely crafted poems—what Shenandoah editor R.T. Smith rightly calls York's "demanding poetic"—are not bound by that context".

His sophomore book, A Murmuration of Starlings, won the 2008 Colorado Book Award in Poetry and was published through the Crab Orchard Series in Poetry. His third book, Persons Unknown, was published in 2010 as an editor's selection in the Crab Orchard Series in Poetry by Southern Illinois University Press. Both books chronicled and eulogized the martyrs of the Civil Rights Movement.

In 2009, York was the University of Mississippi's Summer Poet in Residence. On February 14, 2010, York was awarded the Third Coast Poetry Prize. He had already received a National Endowment for the Arts Creative Writing Fellowship in poetry.

His fourth book, Abide, was completed in 2012 shortly before his death and published by Southern Illinois University Press in 2014. Abide was named a finalist for the National Book Critics Circle Award for Poetry. In 2014 York was also posthumously named as the recipient of the Witter Bynner Fellowship by the U.S. Poet Laureate.

In honor of York's poetry and life, Copper Nickel and Milkweed Editions run the Jake Adam York Prize for a first or second poetry collection. The winning books are published by Milkweed Editions.

== Reception ==
Natasha Trethewey described A Murmuration of Starlings as

a fierce, beautiful, necessary book. Fearless in their reckoning, these poems resurrect contested histories and show us that the past—with its troubled beauty, its erasures, and its violence—weighs upon us all . . . a murmuration so that we don't forget, so that no one disappears into history.

According to Adam Palumbo in The Rumpus,

York's study into the Civil Rights Movement is not meant to be an indictment of the American consciousness; rather, he strives to present the stories of these persons unknown so that his reader cannot help but reflect on this murderous chapter in American history. He never sinks into oblique facts, but he does not forget them, either. He never ignores the simple truth that he is writing poetry, and crafts a collection that is moving and substantial. Persons Unknown is a necessary addition to the oeuvre of civil rights literature and the conversation it (still) invokes.

== Death ==
York died on December 16, 2012, from a stroke.

== Awards and honors ==
- 2014 National Book Critics Circle Award (Poetry) finalist for Abide
- 2014 Witter Bynner Fellowship
- 2012 National Endowment for the Arts Creative Writing Fellowship
- 2008 Colorado Book Award in Poetry

== Selected publications ==
- Abide (Southern Illinois Press, 2014)
- Persons Unknown (Southern Illinois Press, 2010)
- A Murmuration of Starlings (Southern Illinois University Press, 2008)
- Murder Ballads (Elixir Press, 2005)
- The Architecture of Address: The Monument and Public Speech in American Poetry (Routledge, 2005)
