= Interzone: The 2nd Anthology =

1987 anthology edited by John Clute, Simon Ounsley and David Pringle

First edition

Interzone: The 2nd Anthology is an anthology edited by John Clute, Simon Ounsley and David Pringle published in 1987 by Simon & Schuster in the UK and by St. Martin's Press in the US.

== Plot summary ==
Interzone: The 2nd Anthology is an anthology consisting of 15 stories previously published in Interzone magazine.

== Reception ==
Dave Langford reviewed Interzone: The 2nd Anthology for White Dwarf #94, and stated that "a good sampler if you're one of the pitiful outcasts who don't subscribe."

== Reviews ==
- Review by Faren Miller (1987) in Locus, #322 November 1987
- Review by Don D'Ammassa (1988) in Science Fiction Chronicle, #101 February 1988
- Review by Mike Moir (1988) in Vector 143
- Review by Stef Lewicki (1988) in Foundation, #42 Spring 1988
