= Rachel Swirsky =

American writer (born 1982)

- Born: April 14, 1982 (age 44); San Jose, California, U.S.
- Education: University of California, Santa Cruz; Iowa Writers' Workshop
- Occupation: Author
- Writing career
- Period: 2006–present
- Genres: Science fiction, fantasy
- Notable works: "The Lady Who Plucked Red Flowers Beneath the Queen's Window"; "If You Were a Dinosaur, My Love"
- Notable awards: Nebula Award (2010, 2013)
- Website: rachelswirsky.com

Rachel Swirsky (born April 14, 1982, in San Jose, California) is an American literary, speculative fiction and fantasy writer, poet, and editor living in Oregon. She was the founding editor of the PodCastle podcast and served as editor from 2008 to 2010. She served as vice president of the Science Fiction and Fantasy Writers of America in 2013.

She has been published in such literary publications as PANK, the Konundrum Engine Literary Review, and the New Haven Review. Her speculative fiction work has appeared in numerous markets including Tor.com, Subterranean Magazine, Beneath Ceaseless Skies, Fantasy Magazine, Interzone, Realms of Fantasy, and Weird Tales, and collected in a variety of year's best anthologies, including Gardner Dozois's The Year's Best Science Fiction, Rich Horton's The Year's Best Science Fiction & Fantasy, Jonathan Strahan's Year's Best Science Fiction and Fantasy of the Year, and Jeff & Ann VanderMeer's Best American Fantasy.

Her novella "The Lady Who Plucked Red Flowers Beneath the Queen’s Window" won the 2011 Nebula Award. and was also a nominee for a 2011 Hugo Award and for the 2011 World Fantasy Award.

Swirsky's short story "If You Were a Dinosaur, My Love" won the 2013 Nebula Award for Best Short Story, and was nominated for the Hugo award for best short story of 2013.

== Biography ==
Swirsky was born in 1982 in San Jose, California into a Jewish family. A graduate of the University of California, Santa Cruz and the Iowa Writers' Workshop, Swirsky taught undergraduate science fiction and fantasy writing while a teaching assistant at the University of Iowa. In 2005, she attended the Clarion West writers workshop.

In addition to her fiction, Swirsky writes critical essays, reviews, and other non-fiction.

Swirsky has donated her writing to a number of charity anthologies. Her story "Heat Engine" appeared in Last Bird, Drink Head, a flash fiction anthology supporting the ProLiteracy charity. In September 2010, she contributed a story to the online chapbook story collection Clash of the Geeks, presented by Subterranean Press supporting the Lupus Alliance of America.

Swirsky lives in Portland, Oregon. She has described herself as a person with disability.

== Awards and critical reception ==
In addition to winning the Nebula, Swirsky's work has been nominated for awards and received other critical attention. Her novella "A Memory of Wind" was a finalist for the 2009 Nebula Awards ballot. Her novelette "Eros, Philia, Agape" was nominated for the Hugo, the Theodore Sturgeon Award, the Locus Award, storySouth magazine's Million Writers Award, and the Tiptree Award. Her novelette "Portrait of Lisane da Patagnia" was a finalist for the 2012 Nebula Awards ballot. 2012 Hugo Award for Best Novelette, and the 2011 Nebula Award for Best Novelette. Her story "Fields of Gold" was nominated for the 2012 Hugo Award for Best Novelette, and the 2011 Nebula Award for Best Novelette. "If You Were a Dinosaur, My Love" won the 2013 Nebula Award for Best Short Story, and was nominated for the 2014 Hugo Award for Best Short Story.

Her poem "The Oracle on River Street" won third place for the Rhysling Award and was reprinted in the 2008 Rhysling anthology. Other work has also been long-listed for the storySouth Million Writers Award, the BSFA Award, and the Tiptree Award.

Her work has been listed on the annual Locus Magazine's Recommended Reading List.

== Bibliography ==
=== Novellas ===
- January Fifteenth (paperback 1st ed.). Tor.com. 2022. ISBN 9781250198945.

=== Collections ===
- How the World Became Quiet and Myths of the Past, Present, and Future (hardcover 1st ed.). Burton, MI: Subterranean Press. 2013. ISBN 9781596065505.
- Through the Drowsy Dark: Short Fiction & Poetry (paperback 1st ed.). Seattle: Aqueduct Press. 2010. ISBN 9781933500386.

=== Edited works ===
- People of the Book: A Decade of Jewish Science Fiction & Fantasy (hardcover 1st ed.). Prime Books. 2010. ISBN 9781607012382.

=== Selected short stories ===
- "Defiled Imagination". PANK Magazine, October 2010
- "The Monster's Million Faces". Tor.com, Sept 8, 2010
- "The Lady Who Plucked Red Flowers Beneath the Queen's Window". Subterranean Magazine, Summer 2010
- "A Memory of Wind". Tor.com, Nov 3 2009
- "Eros, Philia, Agape". Tor.com, Mar 3 2009 (reprinted in Jonathan Strahan's Year's Best Science Fiction and Fantasy of the Year, Vol. 4 and in Rich Horton's The Year's Best Science Fiction & Fantasy, 2010)
- "Marrying the Sun". Fantasy Magazine, June 30, 2008 (reprinted in Jonathan Strahan's The Best Science Fiction and Fantasy of the Year, Vol. 3)
- "How the World Became Quiet: A Post-Human Creation Myth". Electric Velocipede, issue 13 (reprinted in audio at Escape Pod, Sep 20 2008 and in Jeff & Ann VanderMeer's Best American Fantasy 2)
- "A Monkey Will Never Be Rid of Its Black Hands". Subterranean Magazine, Winter 2008
- "Dispersed by the Sun, Melting in the Wind". Subterranean Magazine, Spring 2007
- "The Debt of the Innocent". Glorifying Terrorism, 2007
- "Heartstrung". in Interzone 210 (reprinted in audio at Pseudopod, Mar 28 2008; reprinted in Rich Horton's Fantasy: The Best of the Year, 2008)
- "A Letter Never Sent". in Konundrum Engine Literary Review
- "Scene from a Dystopia". in Subterranean Magazine #4, 2006

=== Selected poetry ===
- "Mundane". Ideomancer, 2010
- "Evening in Pompeii". Ideomancer, 2010
- "String Theory". Ideomancer, September 2009
- "Remembering the World". Electric Velocipede #15-16, Winter 2008
- "The Passionate Oven". Helix #8 (reprinted in Transcriptase)
- "Pro-Life Patter". Diet Soap #2 (originally printed on Alas, a Blog)
- "Terrible Lizards". Diet Soap #1, online edition, February 2008
- "Invitation to Emerald". Lone Star Stories, December 2007
- "A Season with the Geese". Abyss&Apex, third quarter 2007 (reprinted in The Best of Abyss & Apex, Volume One)
- "The Oracle on River Street". Goblin Fruit, Summer 2007
