= Charles D'Amico High School =

Location
- 302 East Ave; Albion, New York 14411; United States; 43.2401°N 78.1833°W

Information
- Type: Public
- Established: 1876; 150 years ago (as high school department within the Albion Union Free School); 1972; 54 years ago (present-day building)
- School district: Albion Central School District
- NCES School ID: 360252000033
- Principal: Jennifer Ashbery
- Teaching staff: 43.93 (on an FTE basis)
- Grades: 9-12
- Gender: Co-ed
- Enrollment: 525 (2023-2024)
- Student to teacher ratio: 11.95
- Campus: Rural: Distant
- Colors: Purple, Gold, and White
- Mascot: Purple Eagles
- Accreditation: New York State Education Department
- USNWR ranking: 2494 (national); 197 (state)
- Yearbook: Chevron
- Website: www.albionk12.org/o/ahs

Charles D'Amico High School , also known as Albion High School , is a secondary school located in Albion, New York which educates students in grades nine through twelve. The school is named for longtime principal Charles C. D'Amico.

The high school operates under what is known as a "block schedule", where students schedule four courses every semester in 20 week blocks. Each blocked class is 85 minutes of instruction, and four minute "between class" breaks. Also, with classes such as band, chorus, yearbook, and newspaper journalism, meet every other day instead of every day. Students who decide to take college courses are able to choose between GCC (Genesee Community College) and SUNY Brockport to earn college credit. For students whom want to take AP classes, there are currently 7 classes available. Along with higher education courses, internships are also available to students who qualify. Niagara-Orleans BOCES is also jointed with the school offering students hands on courses in a trade of their choice.

As a requirement, students must complete 30 hours of community service and finish an MST (Math, Science, Technology) project to graduate. For AP students, a service-learning project is required for each class. This project involves the incorporation of the class and acquired skills in hope to better the community. These projects are popular with middle and high schools, and is becoming an important aspect of Albion's classes.

Clubs and sports are important aspects of student life at this public school. Two main clubs are the FFA and the National Honor Society. Some other clubs include drama, Marching band, Chess, masterminds, and youth court. Men's and Women's sports include football, cheerleading, volleyball, soccer, wrestling, basketball, swimming, baseball, track and softball have always been a driving part of Albion high as well. Many of the teams have been consistent league champions. Also, these teams are known to consistently earn high academic awards as well. The school is very well known for its football rivalry with Medina.

Principals
Name	Tenure
Carl I. Bergerson	1920 – 1935
Charles C. D'Amico	1935 – 1958
Theodore N. Anderson	1958 – 1968
Aldo O. Prosperi	1968 – January 1969
William Host	January 1969 – June 1969 (interim)
Edgar Clark	July 1969 –
John E. Stefano	– 1975
John Greene	– 1994
Gary Mix	1994 – 2002
Matthew Peterson	
Jennifer Ashbery	2019-
