= University of West Bohemia =

University in Plzeň, Czech Republic

University of West Bohemia in Pilsen
- Západočeská univerzita v Plzni
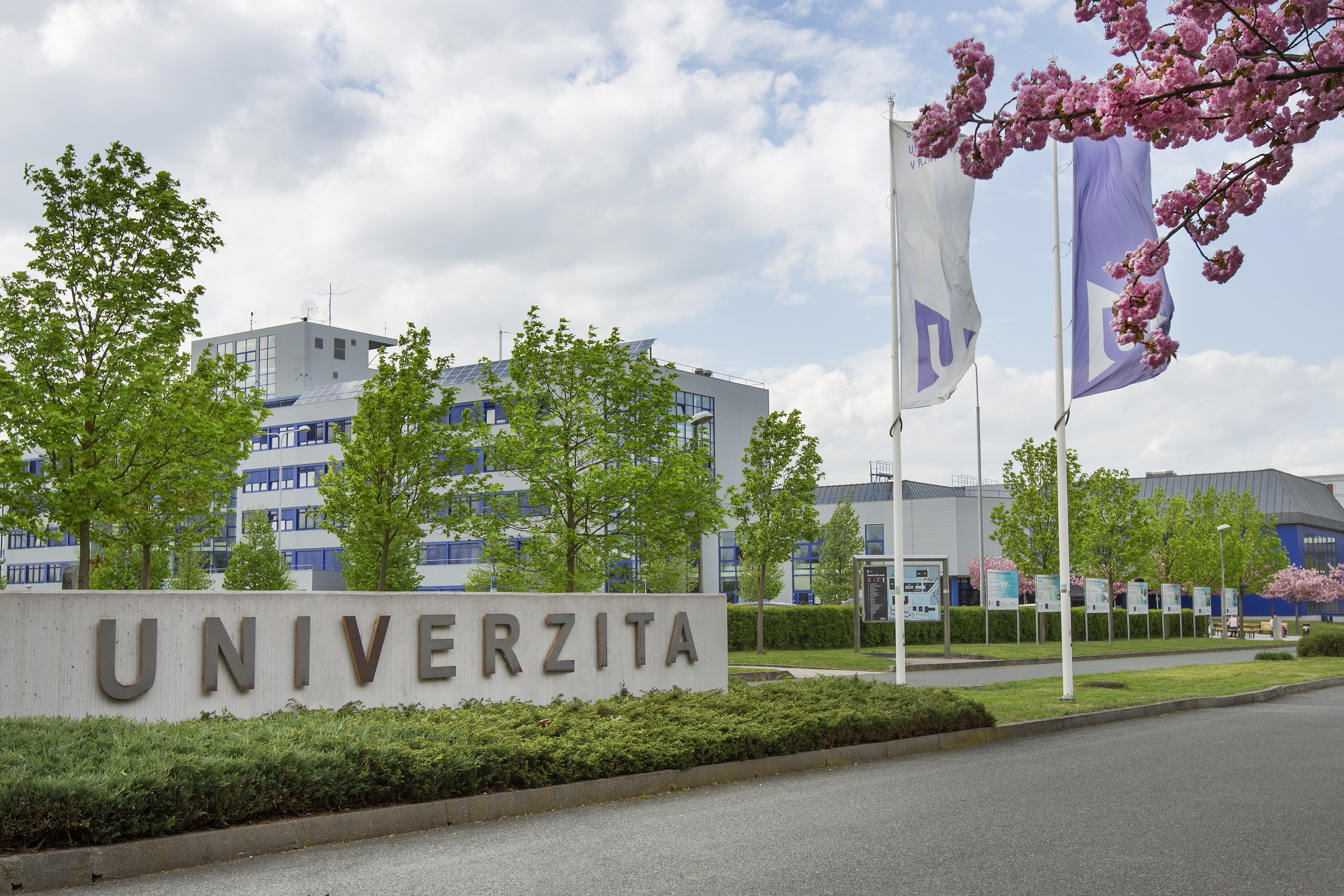
- Type: Public
- Established: 1991
- Rector: prof. RNDr. Miroslav Lávička, Ph.D.
- Academic staff: 954
- Administrative staff: 1,364
- Students: 11,026
- Doctoral students: 610
- Location: Plzeň, Czech Republic; 49°43′25.28″N 13°21′5.55″E
- Website: www.zcu.cz/en

University rankings

Regional – Overall
- QS Emerging Europe and Central Asia: 125 (2022)

The University of West Bohemia in Pilsen (Czech: Západočeská univerzita v Plzni, ZČU) is a university in Plzeň, Czech Republic. It was founded in 1991 and consists of nine faculties.

== History ==
The university was formed by the merger of the College of Mechanical and Electrical Engineering and the Faculty of Education in Plzeň. The College of Mechanical and Electrical Engineering was established in 1949 as a part of the Czech Technical University in Prague. It became an independent School in 1953. The Faculty of Electrical Engineering and the Faculty of Mechanical Engineering were formed in 1960. The Faculty of Applied Sciences and the Faculty of Economics were formed in 1990. The Faculty of Education was formed in 1948 as a Plzeň subsidiary of the Faculty of Education, Charles University in Prague. It became separate in 1953 as a College of Education and was later renamed as the Institute of Education. It became an independent Faculty of Education in 1964. Both Schools merged in 1991 as the University of West Bohemia.

The Faculty of Law was established in 1993, The Faculty of Philosophy and Art in 2001, The Faculty of Art and Design in 2013 and The Faculty of Health Care Studies in 2008 when Private College in Plzeň merged with the university.

== Organization ==
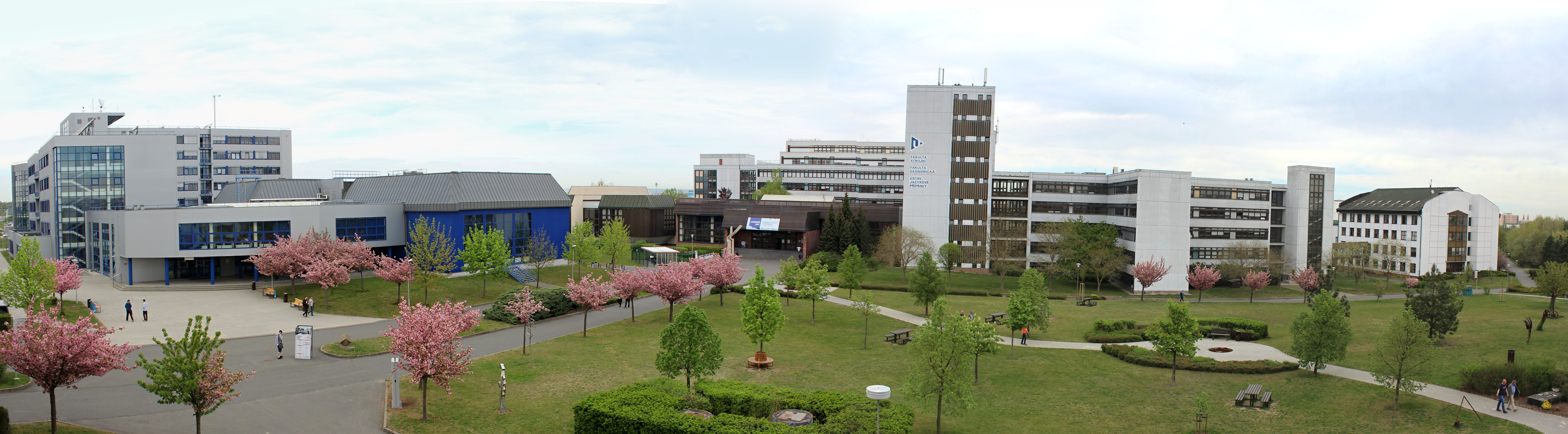
Campus Bory

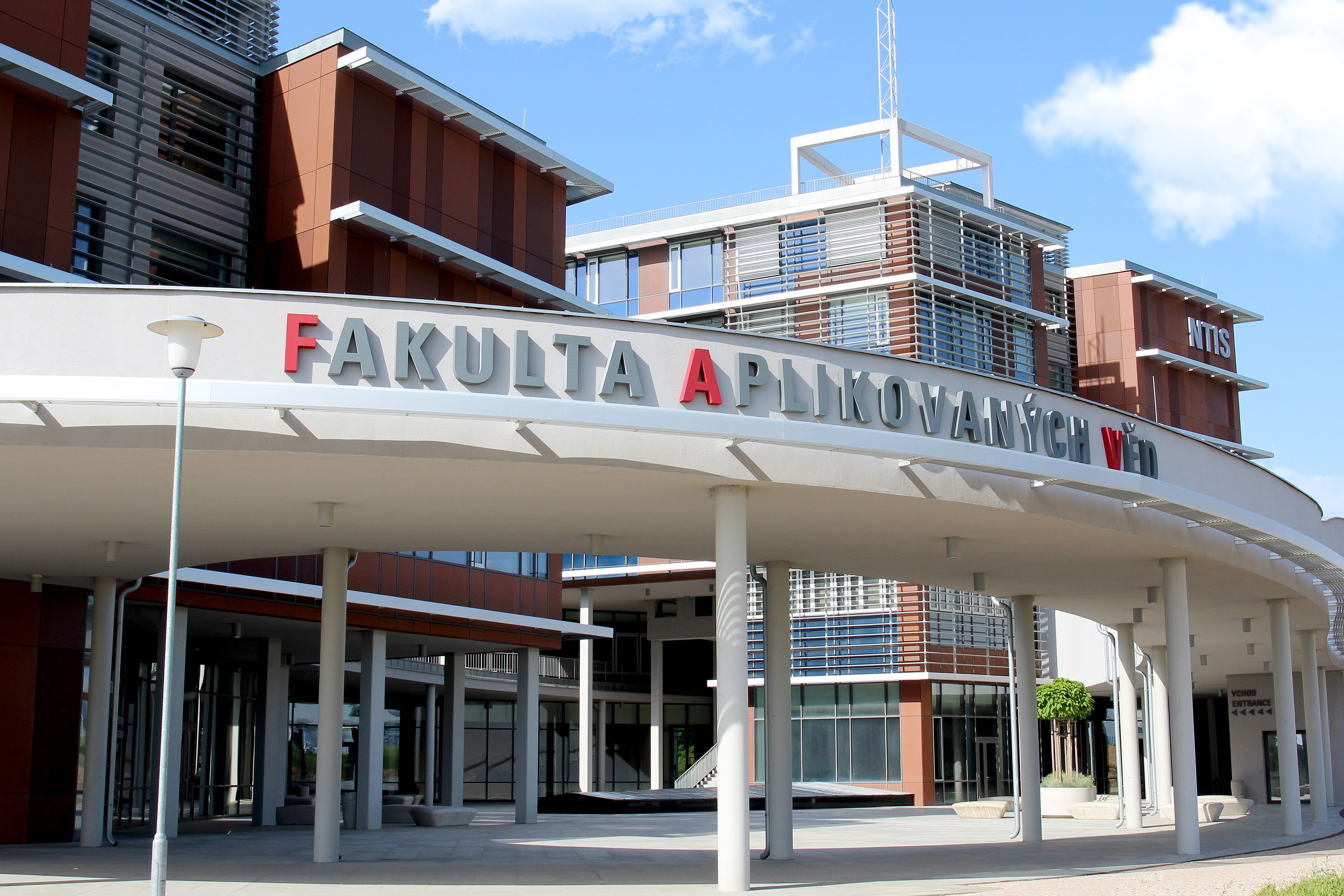
The Faculty of Applied Sciences

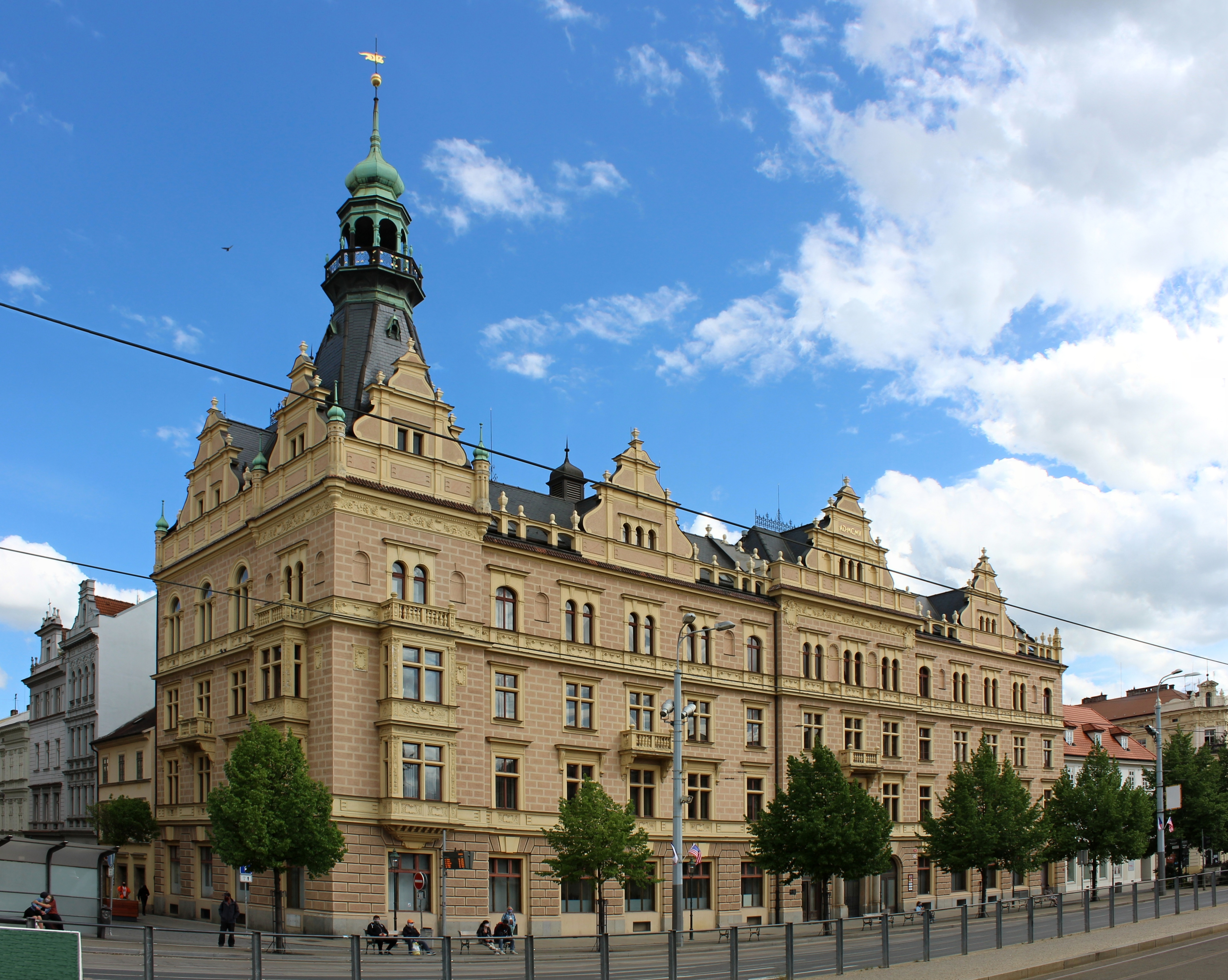
The Faculty of Law

The faculties are the basic units of the university. The units implement their own academic programs. Departments and institutes are responsible for the delivery of courses and for conducting research.

- The Faculty of Applied Sciences
- The Faculty of Economics
- The Faculty of Electrical Engineering
- The Faculty of Philosophy and Arts
- The Faculty of Education
- The Faculty of Law
- The Faculty of Mechanical Engineering
- Ladislav Sutnar Faculty of Design and Art
- The Faculty of Health Care Studies
- New Technologies - Research Centre in the West Bohemia region

== Rectors of ZČU ==
- doc. RNDr. Jiří Holenda, CSc. (1992–1998)
- prof. Ing. Zdeněk Vostracký, DrSc.(1998–2004)
- doc. Ing. Josef Průša, CSc. (2004–2011)
- doc. PaedDr. Ilona Mauritzová, Ph.D. (2011–2015)
- doc. Dr. RNDr. Miroslav Holeček (2015–2023)
- prof. RNDr. Miroslav Lávička, Ph.D. (since 2023)

== Notable faculty ==
- Justin Quinn, Irish
- Brad Vice, English
