= The Lady Who Plucked Red Flowers Beneath the Queen's Window =

2010 novella by Rachel Swirsky

- Author: Rachel Swirsky
- Language: English
- Genre: Fantasy fiction
- Publisher: Subterranean Magazine
- Publication date: 2010
- Publication place: United States
- Media type: Print, ebook

"The Lady Who Plucked Red Flowers Beneath the Queen's Window" is a fantasy novella by American writer Rachel Swirsky. It explores the conjunction of invocation, deep time, and culture shock. It was originally published in Subterranean Magazine, in the summer of 2010, and subsequently republished in The Year’s Best Science Fiction and Fantasy 2011 (from Prime Books) and "The Best Science Fiction and Fantasy of the Year, Vol. 5" (from Night Shade Books).

== Synopsis ==
Naeva—the Lady of the story's title—is a sorceress in a matriarchy. After being fatally injured, she is persuaded to allow her spirit to be bound, so that she can be summoned and thus continue to advise her queen. However, after the queen has herself died, Naeva continues to be summoned — first by the queen's successor, and then by people from civilizations later than hers. She grows into a legendary figure, part of a group of similarly bound souls called Insomniacs. Eventually the universe ends and a strange creature invites her and the other Insomniacs into a new one.

== Reception ==
"The Lady Who Plucked Red Flowers Beneath the Queen's Window" won the 2011 Nebula Award for Best Novella, and was a finalist for the 2011 Hugo Award for Best Novella and the 2011 World Fantasy Award for Best Novella It was included on Locus's 2010 "Recommended Reading" list, and on the "honorable mentions" list in The Year's Best Science Fiction: Twenty-Eighth Annual Collection.

The Washington City Paper compared it to the work of Vonda N. McIntyre and Suzy McKee Charnas, while Tor.com called it "gripping", with a "scope (that) is astounding" and "prose (that) is phenomenal". Kirkus Reviews, however, faulted it for its "staccato pacing and unfinished air".
