= Nick Lowe (classicist) =

British classical scholar and film critic

- Born: 1956 (age 69–70); Manchester, England
- Education: University of Cambridge
- Occupations: • Classical scholar • Film critic

Nick Lowe (/loʊ/; born 1956) is a British classical scholar and film critic.

He is a reader in classics in the Department of Classics and Philosophy at Royal Holloway, a constituent college of the University of London, with interests including narratology and reception of Greek antiquity in historical fiction.

Lowe is also a film reviewer for the science-fiction magazine Interzone, writing the column Mutant Popcorn since the mid-1980s; he won a British Science Fiction Association Award for the column in 2009. The 25th anniversary of his column was celebrated by a special issue of Interzone in 2010, including reprints of his first reviews and an interview with Lowe.

== Early life and education ==
He was born in Manchester, England, and raised in Glasgow, Scotland. He was educated at Fettes College, Edinburgh, before going on to read classics at Jesus College, Cambridge, where he received his Master of Arts and Doctor of Philosophy degrees. His doctoral advisor was Geoffrey Kirk.

== Career ==
He taught classics at three different colleges in the University of London before being appointed lecturer in Greek literature at Royal Holloway.

=== Books ===
- Theatre Ancient and Modern (2000), edited with Hardwick, L., Ireland, S. & Macintosh, F., Open University Press.
- The Classical Plot and the Invention of Western Narrative (2000), Cambridge: Cambridge University Press.
- Comedy (2008). Cambridge: Cambridge University Press. (Greece & Rome: New Surveys in the Classics).
- Erôs in Ancient Greece (2013), edited with Sanders, E., Thumiger, C. & Carey, C., Oxford University Press.

== See also ==
- List of film critics
- List of Glaswegians
- List of people from Manchester
- List of University of Cambridge members
- List of University of London people
