= Eugie Foster =

American writer and editor (1971–2014)

- Foster in 2010
- Born: December 30, 1971; Urbana, Illinois, U.S.
- Died: September 27, 2014 (aged 42); Atlanta, Georgia, U.S.
- Occupations: Writer; columnist; editor
- Writing career
- Genres: Science fiction, fantasy
- Notable works: "Sinner, Baker, Fabulist, Priest; Red Mask, Black Mask, Gentleman, Beast" "When It Ends, He Catches Her"
- Notable awards: Nebula–Novelette (2010)
- Website: www.eugiefoster.com

Eugie Foster (December 30, 1971 – September 27, 2014) was an American short story writer, columnist, and editor. Her stories were published in a number of magazines and book anthologies, including Fantasy Magazine, Realms of Fantasy, Orson Scott Card's InterGalactic Medicine Show, and Interzone. Her collection of short stories, Returning My Sister's Face and Other Far Eastern Tales of Whimsy and Malice, was published in 2009. She won the 2009 Nebula Award and was nominated for multiple other Nebula, BSFA, and Hugo Awards. The Eugie Foster Memorial Award for Short Fiction is given in her honour.

== Life and career ==
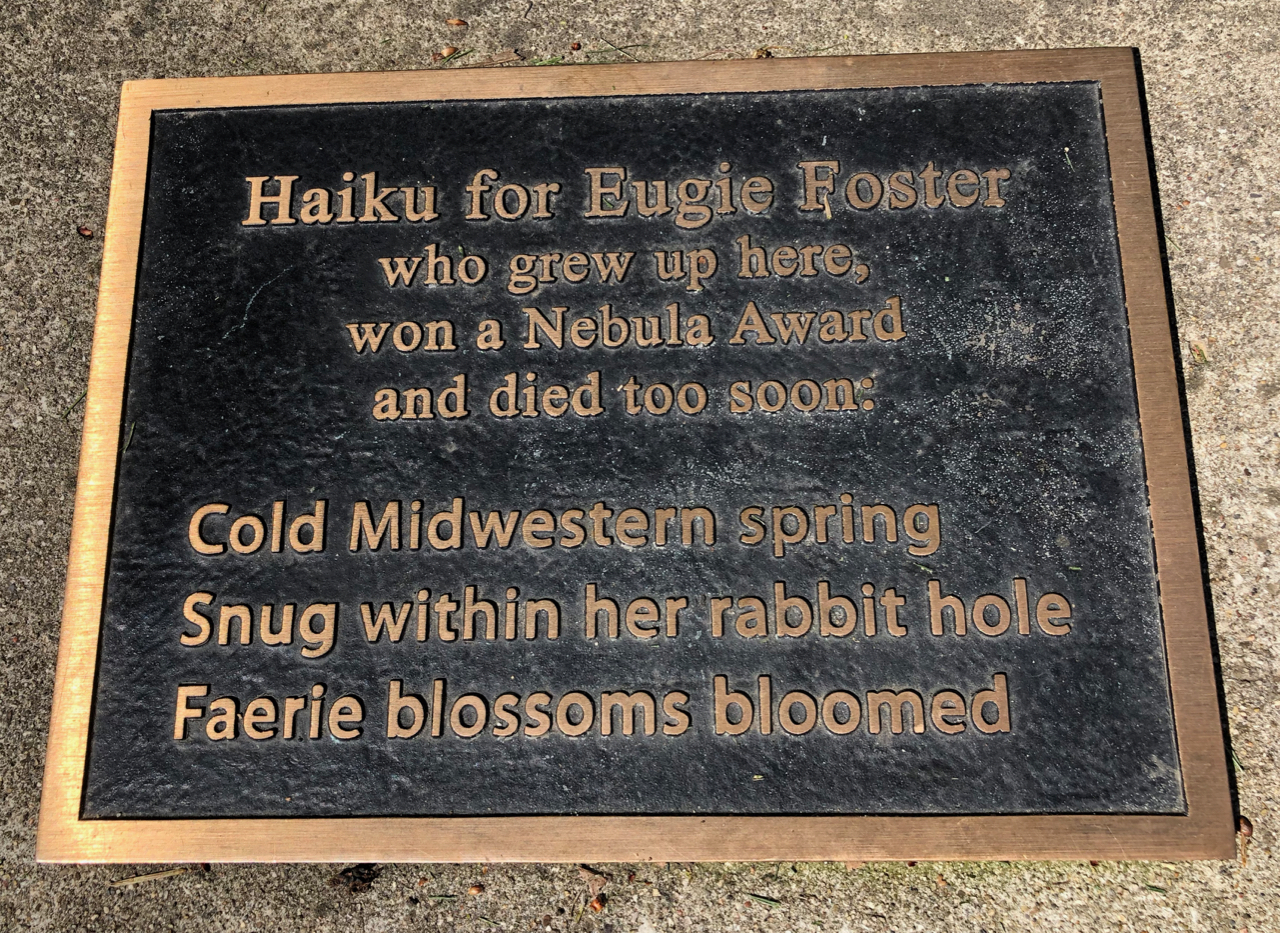
Memorial plaque for Foster in Hessel Park, Champaign, Illinois

Born December 30, 1971, in Urbana, Illinois, Foster lived in Atlanta, Georgia. She earned a master's degree in developmental psychology at Illinois State University and worked as an editor of legislation for the Georgia General Assembly. In 1992 she married Matthew M. Foster.

In the science fiction and fantasy field Foster worked as the managing editor for both Tangent Online and The Fix, two online short fiction review magazines. She was also a director for Dragon Con and edited their onsite newsletter, the Daily Dragon. Foster wrote "Writing for Young Readers," a monthly column for children's literature and young adult literature writers.

Foster died at Emory University Hospital on September 27, 2014 from respiratory failure, a complication of treatments for large B-cell lymphoma, with which she was diagnosed on October 15, 2013.

A plaque and bench in Foster's memory are located in Hessel Park in Champaign, Illinois.

== Short stories ==
Foster's short stories were published in a number of magazines and books, including Fantasy Magazine, Realms of Fantasy, Orson Scott Card's InterGalactic Medicine Show, Interzone, Best New Romantic Fantasy 2, and Apex Magazine. Her story "Sinner, Baker, Fabulist, Priest; Red Mask, Black Mask, Gentleman, Beast" won the 2009 Nebula Award and was also a finalist for the Hugo and BSFA Awards.

The day before Foster died, Daily Science Fiction published her last story, "When It Ends, He Catches Her." The story was named a finalist for the 2015 Nebula Awards.

In 2022, her story "The Art of Victory When the Game is All the World" was published posthumously in Fantasy & Science Fiction. She wrote the story while sick with cancer, but died before she could submit it for publication.

== Awards ==
Year	Title	Award	Category	Result	Ref.
2007	—	Astounding Award	—	Longlisted	
2009	"Sinner, Baker, Fabulist, Priest..."	BSFA Award	Short Fiction	Finalist	
2010	"Sinner, Baker, Fabulist, Priest..."	Interzone Readers Poll	(Interzone Stories)	Nominated–2nd	
2010	"Sinner, Baker, Fabulist, Priest..."	Hugo Award	Novelette	Finalist	
2010	"Sinner, Baker, Fabulist, Priest..."	Nebula Award	Novelette	Won	
2010	"Sinner, Baker, Fabulist, Priest..."	WSFA Small Press Award	—	Finalist	
2015	"When It Ends, He Catches Her"	Hugo Award	Short Story	Finalist	
2015	"When It Ends, He Catches Her"	Nebula Award	Short Story	Finalist	
2015	"When It Ends, He Catches Her"	Theodore Sturgeon Award	—	Finalist	
2016	—	Phoenix Award	—	Won	

== Published works ==
Foster's short fiction appeared in the following:

=== Anthologies ===
Year	Title	First Publication
2002	"The Adventures of Manny the Mailmobile"	—— (Jan–Feb 2002). "The Adventures of Manny the Mailmobile". Cicada.
2003	"All in My Mind"	—— (2003). "All in My Mind". Hitting the Skids in Pixeltown. Phobos Books.
2005	"The Bunny of Vengeance and the Bear of Death"	—— (2006). "The Bunny of Vengeance and the Bear of Death". Fantasy Magazine.
2006	"Returning My Sister's Face"	—— (2006). "Returning My Sister's Face". Best New Fantasy. Prime Books.
2006	"Nothing of Me"	—— (2006). "Nothing of Me". Aegri Somnia. Apex Publications.
2006	"A Patch of Jewels in the Sky"	—— (2006). "A Patch of Jewels in the Sky". Dragonfly Spirit.
2006	"Souls of Living Wood"	—— (2006). "Souls of Living Wood". Modern Magic: Dark Tales of Fantasy. Fantasist Enterprises.
2007	"Mistress Fortune Favors the Unlucky"	—— (2007). "Mistress Fortune Favors the Unlucky". Bash Down the Door and Slice Open the Badguy. Fantasist Enterprises.
2007	"The Wizard of Eternal Watch"	—— (2007). "The Wizard of Eternal Watch". Best New Romantic Fantasy 2. Juno Books.
2007	"Honor is a Game Mortals Play"	—— (2007). "Honor is a Game Mortals Play". Heroes in Training. DAW Books.
2007	"Year of the Fox"	—— (2007). "Year of the Fox". So Fey: Queer Faery Fiction. Haworth Press.
2008	"The Life and Times of Penguin"	—— (2008). "The Life and Times of Penguin". Triangulation: Taking Flight. Parsec Ink.
2008	"A Nose for Magic"	—— (2008). "A Nose for Magic". The Pagan Anthology of Short Fiction. Llewellyn Worldwide.
2008	"Princess Bufo Marinus, Also Known as Amy"	—— (2008). "Princess Bufo Marinus, Also Known as Amy". Magic in the Mirrorstone. Mirrorstone Books.
2009	"Sinner, Baker, Fabulist, Priest; Red Mask, Black Mask, Gentleman, Beast"	—— (Jan–Feb 2009). "Sinner, Baker, Fabulist, Priest; Red Mask, Black Mask, Gentleman, Beast". Interzone.
2010	"Mortal Clay, Stone Heart"	—— (2010). "Mortal Clay, Stone Heart". The Dragon and the Stars. DAW Books.
2011	"Black Swan, White Swan"	—— (2011). "Black Swan, White Swan". End of an Aeon. Fairwood Press.
2011	"The Wish of the Demon Achtromagk"	—— (2011). "The Wish of the Demon Achtromagk". The Drabblecast (214).
2011	"Beneath the Silent Bell, the Autumn Sky Turns to Spring"	—— (2011). "Beneath the Silent Bell, the Autumn Sky Turns to Spring". Human for a Day. DAW Books: 198–218.
2011	"The Princess and the Golden Fish"	—— (Jan–Apr 2011). "The Princess and the Golden Fish". Cricket.
2011	"Biba Jibun"	—— (Apr 2011). "Biba Jibun". Apex (23): 21–40.
2011	"Requiem Duet, Concerto for Flute and Voodoo"	—— (Sep 2011). "Requiem Duet, Concerto for Flute and Voodoo". Daily Science Fiction: 9–11.
2012	"The Red String"	—— (Feb 2012). "The Red String". Cricket.
2012	"Little Grace of the House of Death"	—— (2012). "Little Grace of the House of Death". The Drabblecast (266).
2013	"Whatever Skin You Wear"	—— (2013). "Whatever Skin You Wear". Solaris Rising 2. Solaris.
2013	"Trixie and the Pandas of Dread"	—— (Jan 2013). "Trixie and the Pandas of Dread". Apex (44): 26–28.
2013	"The Girl Who Drew Cats"	—— (Feb–Mar 2002). "The Girl Who Drew Cats". Cicada.
2014	"Tried As an Adult"	—— (2014). "Tried as an Adult". Strange Bedfellows. Bundoran Press.
2014	"When It Ends, He Catches Her"	—— (Sep 2014). "When It Ends, He Catches Her". Daily Science Fiction: 26–28.

=== Collections ===
- —— (2005). Inspirations End (paperback ed.). Scrybe Press. p. 23. ISBN 978-1933274065. Contents:
  - "Inspirations End"
  - "Still My Beating Heart"
- —— (2009). Returning My Sister's Face and Other Far Eastern Tales of Whimsy and Malice (hardcover ed.). Norilana Books. p. 208. ISBN 978-1607620105. Contents:
  - "Daughter of Bótù"
  - "The Tiger Fortune Princess"
  - "A Thread of Silk"
  - "The Snow Woman’s Daughter"
  - "The Tanuki-Kettle"
  - "Honor is a Game Mortals Play"
  - "The Raven's Brocade"
  - "Shim Chung the Lotus Queen"
  - "The Tears of My Mother, the Shell of My Father"
  - "Year of the Fox"
  - "The Archer of the Sun and the Lady of the Moon"
  - "Returning My Sister’s Face"
- —— (2011). Mortal Clay, Stone Heart and Other Stories in Shades of Black and White (ebook ed.). Norilana Books. p. 186. ISBN 978-1466165731. Contents:
  - "The Life and Times of Penguin"
  - "Running on Two Legs"
  - "Black Swan, White Swan"
  - "The Bunny of Vengeance and the Bear of Death"
  - "A Nose for Magic"
  - "The Center of the Universe"
  - "The Wizard of Eternal Watch"
  - "Mortal Clay, Stone Heart"
- —— (2013). The King of the Rabbits and Moon Lake and Other Tales of Magic and Mischief (ebook ed.). Smashwords. p. 176. ISBN 978-1310111204. Contents:
  - "The Girl Who Drew Cats"
  - "The Tax Collector's Cow"
  - "When Shakko Did Not Lie"
  - "The Princess and the Golden Fish"
  - "Li TIen and the Demon Nian"
  - "A Parade of Taylups"
  - "Cuhiya's Husband"
  - "The Dragon Breath's Seed"
  - "Kaawwa, Naagan, and the Queen's Diamond Necklace"
  - "The Adventures of Manny the Mailmobile"
  - "A Patch of Jewels in the Sky"
  - "Spring Arrives on a Hob's Tail"
  - "Second Daughter"
  - "Princess Bufo Marinus, Also Known as Amy"
  - "Razi and the Sunbird"
  - "The Red String"
  - "The Tortoise Bride"
  - "The King of the Rabbits and Moon Lake"
