= StorySouth =

Online literary magazine

storySouth
- Discipline: Literary journal
- Language: English
- Edited by: Terry Kennedy

Publication details
- History: 2001-present
- Publisher: Spring Garden Press (United States)
- Frequency: Quarterly

Standard abbreviations
- ISO 4: StorySouth

Indexing
- OCLC no.: 60679263

Links
- Journal homepage

storySouth is an online quarterly literary magazine that publishes fiction, poetry, criticism, essays, and visual artwork, with a focus on the Southern United States. The journal also runs the annual Million Writers Award to select the best short stories published each year in online magazines or journals. The journal is one of the most prominent online literary journals and has been the subject of feature profiles in books such as Novel & Short Story Writer's Market. Works published in storySouth have been reprinted in a number of anthologies including Best American Poetry and Best of the Web. The headquarters is in Greensboro, North Carolina.

== History and mission ==
storySouth was founded in the autumn of 2001 by fiction writer Jason Sanford and poet Jake Adam York. While storySouth focuses on the traditional genre of southern literature, the journal generally attempts to expose the newest generation of writers from the American South. Sanford and York turned over publication of storySouth to Spring Garden Press in 2009 and now serve as Editor Emeritus for the journal, but no longer handle day-to-day editorial responsibilities.

The journal has published pieces on such prominent authors such as Forrest Gander and Charles Wright, historical figures like George Wallace, and topics ranging from the trivial to the sociological. Works published in storySouth have been reprinted in anthologies such as Best American Poetry, multiple editions of Best of the Web, and e2ink: The Best of the Online Journals, and have won a number of awards and honors.

The journal is listed as a contributing press by the Pushcart Prize and is among the American literary journals listed in Best American Short Stories. StorySouth reaches on average a 1,000 individual readers every day. The journal has been included in lists of prominent literary journals.

== Million Writers Award ==
storySouth runs the annual Million Writers Award, started in 2003, which honors the best online short stories of the year. Past winners have included Adam-Troy Castro, Jenny Williams, Matt Bell, Catherynne M. Valente, Richard Bowes and Randa Jarrar. The award structure is egalitarian; it allows for anyone to nominate a short story, prize money is donated by readers and writers, and the winners are selected by public vote from a short list of entries selected by judges.

In 2012 Spotlight Publishing released two anthologies of stories from the Million Writers Award, with one focused on literary stories and the other on science fiction and fantasy stories.

== Influence ==
storySouth was one of the early journals of the online literature movement. Early on, storySouth's influence in the publishing world was evidenced by a feature interview with Jason Sanford in the 2005 Novel and Short Story Writer's Market in which the role of the Internet and the influence of the Million Writers Award was featured.

Part of the growing influence of storySouth has been the sometimes combative nature of its editors. An essay of Sanford's called "Who Wears Short Shorts? Micro Stories and MFA Disgust" sent repercussions through the online literary community, as it ripped into the claimed incestuous nature of Master of Fine Arts programs and creative writing workshops. The essay prompted a large amount of online discussion on the merits of Sanford's claims.

In addition, the journal's editors were heavily involved in the debate around the alleged plagiarism of Southern author Brad Vice. Both of storySouth's editors defended Vice's action and their essays on the affair were mentioned in the subsequent press coverage and on numerous blogs. StorySouth editor Jake Adam York is one of the critics whose epigraph was published in the reprint of Vice's book.

== Notable contributors ==
- Jacob M. Appel
- Kate Daniels
- Greg Downs
- Forrest Gander
- Honorée Fanonne Jeffers
- George Singleton
- Maryanne Stahl
- Lynn Strongin
- Natasha Trethewey
- Daniel Wallace
- Charles Wright

== See also ==
- List of literary magazines
