= Interzone (magazine) =

British fantasy and science fiction magazine

- First issue cover
- Categories: Science fiction magazine
- First issue: Spring 1982
- Country: United Kingdom
- Language: English
- Website: https://interzone.press

Interzone is a British fantasy and science fiction magazine. Published since 1982, Interzone is the eighth-longest-running English language science fiction magazine in history, and the longest-running British science fiction (SF) magazine. Stories published in Interzone have been finalists for the Hugo Awards and have won a Nebula Award and numerous British Science Fiction Awards.

== Publication history ==
In 1981 Malcolm Edwards, who was then a freelance writer, and David Pringle, who chaired that year's British Science Fiction Convention, independently became interested in starting a new science fiction (sf) magazine. Pringle had obtained permission from the convention committee to put that year's profit of £1,300 (equivalent to £5,000 in 2025) towards starting a magazine, and along with Simon Ounsley, Alan Dorey, and Graham James he created a proposal for a 112-page digest-sized magazine. Edwards' proposal was for a 32-page A4-sized magazine, to be funded by subscriptions; he interested John Clute, Colin Greenland, and Roz Kaveney in the idea and sent the proposal to the British Science Fiction Association (BSFA). Dorey was the chair of the BSFA at the time and put Edwards in touch with Pringle.

The two proposals differed in more than just the size and page count: Pringle had imagined a magazine that would publish non-fiction as well as a range of science fiction, whereas Edwards's proposal was for a more literary style of fiction. Despite the differences, planning went ahead; it proved difficult to agree on who should edit the magazine, and eventually it was decided that all eight people involved should edit as an unpaid collective, with all of them reading every submission and agreeing on all editorial decisions. Pringle suggested the title, which came from the city of Interzone described in William Burroughs' novel The Naked Lunch. Charles Platt agreed to act as the American agent for the new magazine. The first issue, in A4 format, was dated Spring 1982, and subscribers to the new magazine received a booklet edition of J. G. Ballard's story News from the Sun. Edwards and Greenland obtained a grant from the British Arts Council that helped support the magazine in its first few years, and it was also assisted by donations from Clive Sinclair and Arthur C. Clarke.

The unwieldy eight-person editorial collective did not last. Graham James was only credited as one of the editors for the first two issues, and Edwards lasted for only two more. Kaveney departed after the seventh issue, and Clute and Dorey after the ninth, though they remained as advisors. Colin Greenland left after the twelfth issue, leaving Ounsley and Pringle as co-editors. Three issues were produced in each of the first two years, after which the schedule settled down to a regular quarterly for five years before becoming bimonthly in late 1988 and obtaining newsagent distribution. Ounsley left for health reasons after the Summer 1988 issue, leaving Pringle in sole charge. Pringle's first issue, dated September 1988, began a short bimonthly stretch, and with the May 1990 issue it became monthly.

In 1991 Pringle made arrangements with Charles Ryan, the editor of the American magazine Aboriginal Science Fiction, to exchange the contents of the two magazines for a month as a way of promoting each magazine to the subscribers of the other. The May 1991 issue of Interzone accordingly including most of the contents of the May/June 1991 issue of Aboriginal, and the following month the exchange was reversed: the July/August 1991 Aboriginal printed most of the contents of the June 1991 Interzone. The result of the experiment disappointed Pringle; there was no increase in subscriptions, though there were a handful of positive comments from readers. Pringle had launched another literary magazine, Million, and merged it with Interzone in September 1991. In 1994 Interzone absorbed Nexus, a small-press science fiction magazine edited by Paul Brazier that had seen three issues, and Brazier joined the Interzone staff as the designer and typesetter.

Pringle was able to maintain the monthly schedule for over a decade, but in 2002 it became erratic, with ten issues that year. From May 2003 the magazine was bimonthly, though Pringle was still trying to keep it to a monthly schedule, but in November the change was made permanent. Only one more bimonthly issue appeared; the next, dated Spring 2004, was three months late, and was the last one edited by Pringle. For personal and financial reasons Pringle gave up the magazine, selling it that year to Andy Cox, who had been publishing another sf magazine, The Third Alternative, since 1994. Cox returned the magazine to a bimonthly schedule, starting with the September/October 2004 issue, and maintained it until the end of 2017. The January/February 2018 issue was skipped, as was the July/August 2020 issue. Cox looked into selling the magazine to PS Publishing, though he changed his mind on learning that they planned to produce only digital editions, and no print version; and also because PS told him they would not honour existing subscriptions. Cox published only one issue in 2021 and another in 2022, after which it was acquired by Gareth Jelley. Jelley published two more print issues, dated January and September 2023, and then converted it to a bimonthly electronic-only format, with no print version.

== Contents and reception ==
Issue data for 1982 to 2024
| | Spring | | | Summer | | | Autumn | | | Winter | | |
| | Jan | Feb | Mar | Apr | May | Jun | Jul | Aug | Sep | Oct | Nov | Dec |
|---|---|---|---|---|---|---|---|---|---|---|---|---|
| 1982 | 1/1 | | | 1/2 | | | 1/3 | | | | | |
| 1983 | 1/4 | | | | | | 5 | | | 6 | | |
| 1984 | 7 | | | 8 | | | 9 | | | 10 | | |
| 1985 | 11 | | | 12 | | | 13 | | | 14 | | |
| 1986 | 15 | | | 16 | | | 17 | | | 18 | | |
| 1987 | 19 | | | 20 | | | 21 | | | 22 | | |
| 1988 | 23 | | | 24 | | | | | 25 | | 26 | |
| 1989 | 27 | | 28 | | 29 | | 30 | | 31 | | 32 | |
| 1990 | 33 | | 34 | | 35 | 36 | 37 | 38 | 39 | 40 | 41 | 42 |
| 1991 | 43 | 44 | 45 | 46 | 47 | 48 | 49 | 50 | 51 | 52 | 53 | 54 |
| 1992 | 55 | 56 | 57 | 58 | 59 | 60 | 61 | 62 | 63 | 64 | 65 | 66 |
| 1993 | 67 | 68 | 69 | 70 | 71 | 72 | 73 | 74 | 75 | 76 | 77 | 78 |
| 1994 | 79 | 80 | 81 | 82 | 83 | 84 | 85 | 86 | 87 | 88 | 89 | 90 |
| 1995 | 91 | 92 | 93 | 94 | 95 | 96 | 97 | 98 | 99 | 100 | 101 | 102 |
| 1996 | 103 | 104 | 105 | 106 | 107 | 108 | 109 | 110 | 111 | 112 | 113 | 114 |
| 1997 | 115 | 116 | 117 | 118 | 119 | 120 | 121 | 122 | 123 | 124 | 125 | 126 |
| 1998 | 127 | 128 | 129 | 130 | 131 | 132 | 133 | 134 | 135 | 136 | 137 | 138 |
| 1999 | 139 | 140 | 141 | 142 | 143 | 144 | 145 | 146 | 147 | 148 | 149 | 150 |
| 2000 | 151 | 152 | 153 | 154 | 155 | 156 | 157 | 158 | 159 | 160 | 161 | 162 |
| 2001 | 163 | 164 | 165 | 166 | 167 | 168 | 169 | 170 | 171 | 172 | 173 | 174 |
| 2002 | 175 | 176 | 177 | 178 | 179 | 180 | | 181 | 182 | 183 | 184 | |
| 2003 | 185 | 186 | 187 | 188 | 189 | | 190 | | 191 | | 192 | |
| 2004 | 193 | | | | | | | | 194 | | 195 | |
| 2005 | 196 | | 197 | | 198 | | 199 | | 200 | | 201 | |
| 2006 | 202 | | 203 | | 204 | | 205 | | 206 | | 207 | |
| 2007 | 208 | | 209 | | 210 | | 211 | | 212 | | 213 | |
| 2008 | 214 | | 215 | | 216 | | 217 | | 218 | | 219 | |
| 2009 | 220 | | 221 | | 222 | | 223 | | 224 | | 225 | |
| 2010 | 226 | | 227 | | 228 | | 229 | | 230 | | 231 | |
| 2011 | 232 | | 233 | | 234 | | 235 | | 236 | | 237 | |
| 2012 | 238 | | 239 | | 240 | | 241 | | 242 | | 243 | |
| 2013 | 244 | | 245 | | 246 | | 247 | | 248 | | 249 | |
| 2014 | 250 | | 251 | | 252 | | 253 | | 254 | | 255 | |
| 2015 | 256 | | 257 | | 258 | | 259 | | 260 | | 261 | |
| 2016 | 262 | | 263 | | 264 | | 265 | | 266 | | 267 | |
| 2017 | 268 | | 269 | | 270 | | 271 | | 272 | | 273 | |
| 2018 | | | 274 | | 275 | | 276 | | 277 | | 278 | |
| 2019 | 279 | | 280 | | 281 | | 282 | | 283 | | 284 | |
| 2020 | 285 | | 286 | | 287 | | | | 288 | | 289 | |
| 2021 | | | | | 290/291 | | | | | | | |
| 2022 | | | | | | | 292/293 | | | | | |
| 2023 | 294 | | | | | | | | 295 | | 296 | |
| 2024 | 297 | | 298 | | 299 | | | 300 | | | | |
| 2025 | | 301 | | | | 302 | | | | | | |
Issues of Interzone, showing volume/issue number. Underlining indicates that an issue was titled as a quarterly (e.g. "Spring 2004") rather than as a monthly. Editorial collective Simon Ounsley & David Pringle David Pringle Andy Cox; Gareth Jelley

The first issue included an extract from The Brothel in Rosenstrasse by Michael Moorcock, and stories by Angela Carter, M. John Harrison, John Sladek, and Keith Roberts, whose "Kitemaster" subsequently won the BSFA short fiction award for 1982. The Encyclopedia of Science Fiction (SFE3) describes the early years of the magazine as "hoping rather too obviously to revive something of the feeling of Michael Moorcock's New Worlds and its New-Wave glories", but adds that by 1986 it had developed away from these beginnings. In 1984 and 1985 Pringle published editorials that challenged writers to submit science fiction that was "a more realistic forecast and melding of the social and human impact of technological developments", in SFE3's words. These editorials, along with the availability of Interzone as a fiction market, led to the emergence of a new generation of young British sf writers, including Stephen Baxter, Eric Brown, Nicola Griffith, Peter F. Hamilton, Paul McAuley, Ian McDonald, Alastair Reynolds, Charles Stross, and Liz Williams. Established British writers such as Gwyneth Jones, Brian M. Stableford and Garry Kilworth also became contributors, and Interzone attracted overseas submissions as well, from Eliot Fintushel, Greg Bear, Thomas M. Disch, Karen Joy Fowler, Geoffrey A. Landis, Pat Murphy and Michael Swanwick, among others. The Encyclopedia of Science Fiction (SFE) argues that Interzone was thus responsible for invigorating science fiction writing in the UK, after "long years of near-stagnation in the 1970s and early 1980s", and generating a sense of community among UK sf writers. The science fiction historian Mike Ashley regards Interzone as one of the success stories of the 1980s in science fiction. Having a collective editorial team gave the magazine additional resources in the early days, and its steady growth gave it stability over its first decade, until it was well-established. Dave Nalle, writing for an American audience, called the magazine "a little uneven and a little pretentious, but it seems to have a fairly constant level of quality, though it has some work to do to match the quality of content found in less talked about British magazines like Fantasy Tales and Fantasy Macabre."

Since Pringle was the publisher as well as the editor, he was able to print experimental fiction; this was not true of US magazines such as Analog, Asimov's Science FIction and The Magazine of Fantasy & Science Fiction. Pringle took advantage of this freedom, and the results were sometimes controversial. "Horse Meat", by Brian Aldiss, in the November 1992 issue, involved a rape scene between a stallion and a woman, and led Aldiss to reply to the letters of protest, arguing that it commented on brutal regimes around the world. "The Salt Box", by Gwyneth Jones, in the July 2001 issue, included a reference to underage sex and led to Pringle receiving a visit from the police, though they took no action.

Greg Egan was one of the most popular writers in Interzone during the 1990s, with many well-received stories. The SFE describes his "Learning to Be Me", in the July 1990 Interzone, as one of the best stories of its time, and his fiction frequently did well in Interzone's annual reader popularity polls. The 1990s also saw the debut of Chris Beckett, who published nearly twenty stories in Interzone over a decade before selling elsewhere. Beckett's short story "The Circle of Stones" in the February 1992 issue was expanded into Dark Eden, which won the Arthur C. Clarke Award in 1992. Nick Harkaway's first two sales were to Interzone, under his real name of Nick Cornwell.

Interzone in the 1980s and 1990s carried more non-fiction that the leading US science fiction magazines; only two-thirds of the magazine was fiction. Long-running non-fiction departments included "Mutant Popcorn", a film review column by Nick Lowe, and "Ansible Link", a science fiction news column by David Langford. The SFE describes Interzone's cover and interior art as "uneven" in the early years of the magazine, but singles out Simon M. Short (known as SMS) as a notable early contributor of covers, starting in 1991. When Paul Brazier became the graphic designer in 1994 he helped update the magazine's design, and according to SFE Interzone's appearance improved steadily over the next few years. Under Cox's editorship the nonfiction departments such as reviews were expanded, and new writers continued to appear, along with well-established names like Christopher Priest.

Gardner Dozois referred to Interzone in 2007 as the "handsomest SF magazine in the business". In 2006, the Science Fiction Writers of America removed the magazine from its list of professional markets due to low rates and small circulation. However, within the genre field the magazine is still ranked as a professional publication. As Dozois has stated, "By the definition of SFWA, Interzone doesn't really qualify as a 'professional magazine' because of its low rates and circulation, but as it's thoroughly professional in the caliber of writers that it attracts and in the quality of the fiction it produces, just about everyone considers it to be a professional magazine anyway." It pays semi-professional rates to writers.

=== Awards and recognition ===
Interzone won the Hugo Award for best semiprozine in 1995. In 2005 the Worldcon committee gave David Pringle a Special Committee Award for his work on the magazine which encouraged "fresh ideas and new voices". The magazine has also won the British Fantasy Award, in 2012 and 2022.

Each year, multiple stories published in Interzone are reprinted in the annual "year's best stories" anthologies, while other stories have been finalists for the Hugo and Nebula Awards. In 2010 the magazine became one of only eleven magazines to have a story win a Nebula Award. The winning story was the novelette "Sinner, Baker, Fabulist, Priest; Red Mask, Black Mask, Gentleman, Beast" by Eugie Foster. In addition, 16 stories originally published in Interzone have won the British Science Fiction Award for short fiction.

In 2009 Interzone became the longest-running British SF magazine, passing New Worlds's total with its 223rd issue.

=== Writers ===
Interzone features regular columns by David Langford (Ansible Link– News & Gossip, Obituaries), Tony Lee (Laser Fodder – DVD Reviews) and Nick Lowe (Mutant Popcorn – Film Reviews). In 2010, Lowe won a British Science Fiction Award for his Mutant Popcorn column.

In 2008 a Mundane SF issue was published, guest edited by Geoff Ryman, Julian Todd and Trent Walters.

Leeds-based artist Pete Lyon contributed many illustrations in the 1980s. He was nominated for the British SF Association Awards in 1987 for his cover work on the first Interzone magazine.

== Bibliographic details ==
The editorial succession at Interzone is as follows:

- Spring–Summer 1982. John Clute, Alan Dorey, Malcolm Edwards, Colin Greenland, Graham James, Roz Kaveney, Simon Ounsley, David Pringle.
- Autumn 1982 – Spring 1983. John Clute, Alan Dorey, Malcolm Edwards, Colin Greenland, Roz Kaveney, Simon Ounsley, David Pringle.
- Autumn 1983 – Spring 1984. John Clute, Alan Dorey, Colin Greenland, Roz Kaveney, Simon Ounsley, David Pringle.
- Summer 1984 – Autumn 1984. John Clute, Alan Dorey, Colin Greenland, Simon Ounsley, David Pringle.
- Winter 1984 – Summer 1985. Colin Greenland, Simon Ounsley, David Pringle.
- Autumn 1985 – Summer 1988. Simon Ounsley, David Pringle.
- September 1988 – Spring 2004. David Pringle.
- September/October 2004 – July 2022. Andy Cox.
- January 2023 – current as of August 2024. Gareth Jelley.

The October 1994 issue was guest-edited by Paul Brazier.

Interzone began as an A4 saddle-stapled magazine, and stayed in that format, with some slight size variations, until the September/October 2012 issue, which introduced a perfect-bound format measuring 6.75" by 9.5". For the final two print issues, under Gareth Jelley, the size was reduced again to approximately digest-sized. (Note: See the individual issues of the magazine.)

=== Anthologies ===
In the first years, several anthologies were published.

- John Clute, Colin Greenland and David Pringle: Interzone – The 1st Anthology, Everyman Fiction Limited, 1985
- John Clute, David Pringle and Simon Ounsley: Interzone – The 2nd Anthology, Simon & Schuster Limited, 1987
- John Clute, David Pringle and Simon Ounsley: Interzone – The 3rd Anthology, Simon & Schuster Limited, 1988
- John Clute, David Pringle and Simon Ounsley: Interzone – The 4th Anthology, Simon & Schuster Limited, 1989
- John Clute, David Pringle and Simon Ounsley: Interzone – The 5th Anthology, New English Library Paperbacks, 1991
- David Pringle: The Best of Interzone, Voyager, 1996

The second through fourth anthologies were reissued by New English Library.

== Sources ==
- Ashley, Mike (2016). Science Fiction Rebels: The Story of the Science-Fiction Magazines from 1981 to 1990. Liverpool: Liverpool University Press. ISBN 978-1-78138-260-8.
- Ashley, Mike (2022). The Rise of the Cyberzines: The Story of the Science-Fiction Magazines from 1991 to 2020. Liverpool: Liverpool University Press. ISBN 978-1-80085-648-6.
- "Pringle Exits Interzone". Locus. Vol. 52, no. 5. May 2004. pp. 7, 60.
- "2005 Hugo Awards Ceremony". Locus. Vol. 55, no. 3. September 2005. pp. 5–7, 42.
- "2021 Magazine Summary". Locus. Vol. 88, no. 3. March 2022. pp. 30–37.
- Wells, Patrick (December 2013). "World Fantasy Convention Brighton 2013". Locus. Vol. 71, no. 6. pp. 65–71.
- Myman, Francesca; Sorg, Arley; Trombi, Liza (February 2023). "2022 Magazine Summary". Locus. Vol. 90, no. 2. pp. 49–58.
