= Nebula Awards Showcase 55 =

2021 anthology edited by Catherynne M. Valente

- Cover of first edition
- Editor: Catherynne M. Valente
- Cover artist: Lauren Raye Snow
- Language: English
- Series: Nebula Awards Showcase
- Genre: Science fiction and fantasy
- Publisher: SFWA, Inc.
- Publication date: 2021
- Publication place: United States
- Media type: Print (paperback), ebook
- Pages: 482
- ISBN: 978-0-9828467-5-9
- Preceded by: Nebula Awards Showcase 54
- Followed by: Nebula Awards Showcase 56

Nebula Awards Showcase #55: Outstanding Science Fiction and Fantasy is an anthology of science fiction and fantasy short works edited by American writer Catherynne M. Valente. It was first published in paperback and ebook by SFWA, Inc. in August 2021.

== Summary ==
The book collects pieces that won or were nominated for the Nebula Awards for best novel, novella, novelette, short story, and the Andre Norton Award for the year 2019 (presented in 2020), as well as other material, together with an introduction by the editor. The novel winner, Andre Norton Award winner, novella winner, and novella nominees are represented by excerpts. The non-winning nominees for best novel and the Andre Norton Award are omitted.

== Contents ==
- "Introduction" (Catherynn Valente)
- "The Best of Twines, the Worst of Rhymes: A Tale of Two C++ies (or, Why Game Writing Is Bad and Great)" (Seth Dickinson)
- "Queering Chaos" (Foz Meadows)
- "Lois McMaster Bujold and Being a Grand Master" (LaShawn Wanak)
- "Give the Family My Love" [best short story winner, 2020] (A. T. Greenblatt)
- "The Dead, In Their Uncontrollable Power" [best short story nominee, 2020] (Karen Osborne)
- "And Now His Lordship Is Laughing" [best short story nominee, 2020] (Shiv Ramdas)
- "Ten Excerpts from an Annotated Bibliography on the Cannibal Women of Ratnabar Island" [best short story nominee, 2020] (Nibedita Sen)
- "A Catalog of Storms" [best short story nominee, 2020] (Fran Wilde)
- "How the Trick Is Done" [best short story nominee, 2020] (A. C. Wise)
- "A Strange Uncertain Light" [best novelette nominee, 2020] (G. V. Anderson)
- "For He Can Creep" [best novelette nominee, 2020] (Siobhan Carrol)
- "His Footsteps, Through Darkness and Light" [best novelette nominee, 2020] (Mimi Mondal)
- "The Blur in the Corner of Your Eye" [best novelette nominee, 2020] (Sarah Pinsker)
- "Carpe Glitter" [best novelette winner, 2020] (Cat Rambo)
- "The Archronology of Love" [best novelette nominee, 2020] (Caroline M. Yoachim)
- Excerpt: A Song for a New Day [best novel winner, 2020] (Sarah Pinsker)
- Excerpt: Riverland [Andre Norton award winner, 2020] (Fran Wilde)
- Excerpt: "Anxiety Is the Dizziness of Freedom" [best novella nominee, 2020] (Ted Chiang)
- Excerpt: The Haunting of Tram Car 015 [best novella nominee, 2020] (P. Djèlí Clark)
- Excerpt: This Is How You Lose the Time War [best novella winner, 2020] (Amal El-Mohtar and Max Gladstone)
- Excerpt: "Her Silhouette, Drawn in Water" [best novella nominee, 2020] (Vylar Kaftan)
- Excerpt: The Deep [best novella nominee, 2020] (Rivers Solomon, Daveed Diggs, William Hutson, and Jonathan Snipes)
- Excerpt: Catfish Lullaby [best novella nominee, 2020] (A.C. Wise)
- "Biographies"
- "About the Science Fiction and Fantasy Writers of America (SFWA)"
- "About the Nebula Awards"
