= Nebula Awards Showcase 57 =

2025 anthology edited by Stephen Kotowych

- Cover of first edition
- Editor: Stephen Kotowych
- Cover artist: Lauren Raye Snow
- Language: English
- Series: Nebula Awards Showcase
- Genre: Science fiction and fantasy
- Publisher: SFWA, Inc.
- Publication date: 2025
- Publication place: United States
- Media type: Print (paperback), ebook
- Pages: 389
- ISBN: 978-1-958243-02-2
- Preceded by: Nebula Awards Showcase 56
- Followed by: Nebula Awards Showcase 58

Nebula Awards Showcase 57: The Year's Best Science Fiction and Fantasy is an anthology of science fiction and fantasy short works edited by Stephen Kotowych. It was first published in paperback and ebook by Science Fiction and Fantasy Writers of America, Inc. on March 25, 2025.

== Summary ==
The book collects pieces that won or were nominated for the Nebula Awards for novella, novelette, and short story for the year 2021 (presented in 2022), as well as other material. Not all nominated stories are included; in particular, all non-winning nominees for best novella are omitted.

== Contents ==
- "2021 Nebula Awards"
- Short Stories
  - "Where Oaken Hearts Do Gather" [best short story winner] (Sarah Pinsker)
  - "For Lack of a Bed" [best short story nominee] (John Wiswell)
  - "Let All the Children Boogie" [best short story nominee] (Sam J. Miller)
  - "Mr. Death" [best short story nominee] (Alix E. Harrow)
  - "Proof by Induction" [best short story nominee] (José Pablo Iriarte)
  - "Laughter Among the Trees" [best short story nominee] (Suzan Palumbo)
- Novelettes
  - "O2 Arena" [best novelette winner] (Oghenechovwe Donald Ekpeki)
  - "(emet)" [best novelette nominee] (Lauren Ring)
  - "That Story Isn't the Story" [best novelette nominee] (John Wiswell)
  - "Just Enough Rain" [best novelette nominee] (P H Lee)
  - "Colors of the Immortal Palette" [best novelette nominee] (Caroline M. Yoachim)
- Novella
  - "And What Can We Offer You Tonight" [best novella winner] (Premee Mohamed)
- "Novella & Novel Finalists"
- "MultiMedia Finalists"
