= Nebula Awards Showcase 56 =

2021 anthology edited by Catherynee M. Valente

- Cover of first edition
- Editor: SFWA, Inc.
- Cover artist: Lauren Raye Snow (Illustration), Kate Baker (Design), Noah K. Sturdevant (Interior layout)
- Language: English
- Series: Nebula Awards Showcase
- Genre: Science fiction and fantasy
- Publisher: SFWA, Inc.
- Publication date: December 28, 2024
- Publication place: United States
- Media type: Paperback (print), ebook
- Pages: 482
- ISBN: 978-1-958243-00-8
- Preceded by: Nebula Awards Showcase 55
- Followed by: Nebula Awards Showcase 57

Nebula Awards Showcase #56 is an anthology of science fiction and fantasy short works published by SFWA, Inc. covering a selection of Nebula Award winners and nominees presented in 2021. The anthology had been expected to be published in 2021, but was released at the end of 2024. According to the SFWA press release, "this volume represents a change in strategy for the organization that will result in a speed-up of our processes. This and future volumes will be edited by SFWA's own Publications Committee".

== Delay ==
Most Nebula Awards Showcases follow the pattern of being published the year following the award period (i.e. Nebula Awards Showcase 2008 (#42) covers the 2007 Nebula Awards and was published in 2008) with few exceptions.

SFWA expected to release volume 56 by the end of 2021, but the volume was delayed; announced as "nearing completion" on February 17, 2024. The official release was confirmed on December 18, 2024.

== Contents ==
- Introduction by Cat Rambo

I. Essay

- "Cerberus is the Family Dog: Adapting Greek Myth in Hades" by Greg Kasavin (Nebula Award for Best Game Writing)
- "The Good Place: Life, Death, and the Meaning of Everything" by Kelly Robson (Ray Bradbury Nebula Award for Outstanding Dramatic Presentation)

II. Short Story

- "Advanced Word Problems in Portal Math" by Aimee Picchi (Daily Science Fiction)
- "Badass Moms in the Zombie Apocalypse" by Rae Carson (Uncanny Magazine)
- "The Eight-Thousanders" by Jason Sanford (Asimov's Science Fiction)
- "A Guide for Working Breeds" by Vina Jie-Min Prasad (Solaris)
- "My Country Is a Ghost" by Eugenia Triantafyllou (Uncanny Magazine)
- "Open House on Haunted Hill" by John Wiswell (Diabolical Plots) (Nebula Award Winner)

III. Novelette

- "Burn or the Episodic Life of Sam Wells as a Super" by A. T. Greenblatt (Uncanny Magazine)
- "The Pill" by Meg Elison (PM Press)
- "Shadow Prisons" by Caroline M. Yoachim (Broad Reach Publishing + Adamant Press)
- "Stepsister" by Leah Cypess (The Magazine of Fantasy & Science Fiction)
- "Two Truths and a Lie" by Sarah Pinsker (Tor.com) (Nebula Award Winner)
- "Where You Linger" by Bonnie Jo Stufflebeam (Uncanny Magazine)

IV. Novella

- "Finna" by Nino Cipri (Tor.com)
- "The Four Profound Weaves" by R.B. Lemberg (Tachyon)
- "Ife-Iyoku, the Tale of Imadeyunuagbon" by Oghenechovwe Donald Ekpeki (Aurelia Leo)
- "Ring Shout" by P. Djèlí Clark (Tor.com) (Nebula award Winner)
- "Riot Baby" by Tochi Onyebuchi (Tor.com)
- "Tower of Mud and Straw" by Yaroslav Barsukov (Metaphorosis)

V. Novel

- Network Effect by Martha Wells (Tor.com) (Nebula Award Winner)

VI. Middle Grade and Young Adult Fiction)

- A Wizard's Guide to Defensive Baking by T. Kingfisher (Argyll) (Andre Norton Nebula Award Winner for Middle Grade & Young Adult Fiction)

- Contributor Biographies
