= Nebula Awards Showcase =

Series of annual science fiction and fantasy anthologies

The first volume, published in 1966.

Nebula Award Showcase is a series of annual science fiction and fantasy anthologies collecting stories that have won or been nominated for the Nebula Award, awarded by the Science Fiction and Fantasy Writers of America (SFWA), a nonprofit association of professional science fiction and fantasy writers founded in 1965 by Damon Knight as the Science Fiction Writers of America.

== Title and numbering variations ==
The series has changed title a number of times over the years, with volumes 1-11 and 16-17 called Nebula Award Stories, v. 12-15 Nebula Winners, v. 18-33 Nebula Awards (v. 18-19 with the initial article The), and v. 34 onward Nebula Awards Showcase (v. 45 with the initial article The). Individual volumes are usually distinguished from each other by a volume number or year designation; both have sometimes been used for variant editions of the same volume. In general, numerical designations predominated for the first thirty-three volumes, year designations for the thirty-fourth through fifty-third volumes, and numerical designations again since.

== Timing ==
Most volumes follow the pattern of being published the year following the award period (ie. Nebula Awards Showcase 2008 (#42) covers the 2007 Nebula Awards and was published in 2008). There have, however, been exceptions.

1980 saw publication of both Nebula Winners Thirteen in February and Nebula Winners Fourteen in August, and in 1983 there was another case of double publishing, with Nebula Award Stories Seventeen in August and The Nebula Awards #18 in October.

There were also occasional delays in publication; sixteen months elapsed between the issuing of Nebula Awards 21 (1986) and Nebula Awards 22 (1988) (both edited by George Zebrowski), and there was a three year delay between Nebula Awards Showcase 55 (2021) and Nebula Awards Showcase 56 (2024), followed by the catch-up publication of no less than four volumes in 2025; Nebula Awards Showcase 57, Nebula Awards Showcase 58, Nebula Awards Showcase 59, and Nebula Awards Showcase 60.

== Editors and publishers ==
The series has frequently changed editors and publishers.

Aside from 1985–1997, when each editor edited three volumes in a row, and 2025–2026, when five volumes were edited by one editor, the customary practice has been for every volume to have a different editor, or occasionally a pair of editors. The editors to date (each of one volume, unless otherwise indicated) have been Brian W. Aldiss (co-editor), Kevin J. Anderson, Poul Anderson, Catherine Asaro, Isaac Asimov, Greg Bear, Gregory Benford, Lloyd Biggle, Jr., Michael Bishop (3 volumes), James Blish, Ben Bova, John F. Carr (co-editor), Julie E. Czerneda, Jack Dann (2 volumes), Ellen Datlow, Samuel R. Delany, Gordon R. Dickson, Gardner Dozois, Bill Fawcett, James E. Gunn, Joe Haldeman, Harry Harrison (co-editor), Frank Herbert, Kij Johnson, James Patrick Kelly (co-editor), John Kessel (co-editor), Damon Knight, Stephen Kotowych (5 volumes), Nancy Kress, Mercedes Lackey, Ursula K. Le Guin, Vonda N. McIntyre, Silvia Moreno-Garcia, James Morrow (3 volumes), Frederik Pohl, Jerry Pournelle (co-editor), Marta Randall, Mike Resnick, Kim Stanley Robinson, Pamela Sargent (3 volumes), Nibedita Sen, Robert Silverberg (2 volumes), Clifford D. Simak, Catherynne M. Valente, Kate Wilhelm, Connie Willis, Jane Yolen, George Zebrowski (3 volumes), and Roger Zelazny. Starting with v. 56 (2024), the SFWA announced it and future volumes were being edited by its own Publications Committee. However, in the event only that volume was issued as edited by SFWA, Inc.; the next five volumes being edited by Stephen Kotowych.

The publishers for the first American editions (usually, though not always, the first editions worldwide) have been Doubleday (v. 1-6), Harper & Row (v. 7-15), Holt, Rinehart and Winston (v. 16-17), Arbor House (v. 18-19), Harcourt Brace Jovanovich (v. 20-26), Harcourt Brace (v. 27-33), Harcourt (2000–2001), Roc/New American Library (2002–2010), Tor Books (2011), Pyr (2012–2018), Parvus Press (2019), and SFWA, Inc. (v. 54-61).

== Content ==
The contents of each volume are variable, but usually include an editorial introduction and the stories that won the Nebula Awards for Best Novella, Best Novelette and Best Short Story for the year covered and a selection of stories that were nominated but did not win. Also often included are excerpts from the books that won the Nebula Award for Best Novel and Andre Norton Award, the poems that won the Rhysling Award and Dwarf Stars Award for the year covered (dated for the year published rather than the year awarded, unlike the Nebulas), tributes to prominent recently deceased authors and authors voted Grand Master and Author Emeritus (together with representative pieces by them), surveys of the literature and films of the year covered, and lists of Nebula winners and nominees from previous years.

== The series ==
Publication date and volume editor follow each title.

1. Nebula Award Stories 1965 (1966) (Damon Knight)
2. Nebula Award Stories Two (1967) (Brian W. Aldiss, Harry Harrison)
3. Nebula Award Stories 3 (1968) (Roger Zelazny)
4. Nebula Award Stories 4 (1969) (Poul Anderson)
5. Nebula Award Stories 5 (1970) (James Blish)
6. Nebula Award Stories 6 (1971) (Clifford D. Simak)
7. Nebula Award Stories 7 (1972) (Lloyd Biggle, Jr.)
8. Nebula Award Stories Eight (1973) (Isaac Asimov)
9. Nebula Award Stories 9 (1974) (Kate Wilhelm)
10. Nebula Award Stories 10 (1975) (James E. Gunn)
11. Nebula Award Stories 11 (1976) (Ursula K. Le Guin)
12. Nebula Winners Twelve (1978) (Gordon R. Dickson)
13. Nebula Winners Thirteen (1980) (Samuel R. Delany)
14. Nebula Winners Fourteen (1980) (Frederik Pohl)
15. Nebula Winners Fifteen (1981) (Frank Herbert)
16. Nebula Award Stories Sixteen (1982) (Jerry Pournelle, John F. Carr)
17. Nebula Award Stories Seventeen (1983) (Joe Haldeman)
18. The Nebula Awards #18 (1983) (Robert Silverberg)
19. The Nebula Awards #19 (1984) (Marta Randall)
20. Nebula Awards 20 (1985) (George Zebrowski)
21. Nebula Awards 21 (1986) (George Zebrowski)
22. Nebula Awards 22 (1988) (George Zebrowski)
23. Nebula Awards 23 (1989) (Michael Bishop)
24. Nebula Awards 24 (1990) (Michael Bishop)
25. Nebula Awards 25 (1991) (Michael Bishop)
26. Nebula Awards 26 (1992) (James Morrow)
27. Nebula Awards 27 (1993) (James Morrow)
28. Nebula Awards 28 (1994) (James Morrow)
29. Nebula Awards 29 (1995) (Pamela Sargent)
30. Nebula Awards 30 (1996) (Pamela Sargent)
31. Nebula Awards 31 (1997) (Pamela Sargent)
32. Nebula Awards 32 (1998) (Jack Dann)
33. Nebula Awards 33 (1999) (Connie Willis)
34. Nebula Awards Showcase 2000 (2000) (Gregory Benford)
35. Nebula Awards Showcase 2001 (2001) (Robert Silverberg)
36. Nebula Awards Showcase 2002 (2002) (Kim Stanley Robinson)
37. Nebula Awards Showcase 2003 (2003) (Nancy Kress)
38. Nebula Awards Showcase 2004 (2004) (Vonda N. McIntyre)
39. Nebula Awards Showcase 2005 (2005) (Jack Dann)
40. Nebula Awards Showcase 2006 (2006) (Gardner Dozois)
41. Nebula Awards Showcase 2007 (2007) (Mike Resnick)
42. Nebula Awards Showcase 2008 (2008) (Ben Bova)
43. Nebula Awards Showcase 2009 (2009) (Ellen Datlow)
44. Nebula Awards Showcase 2010 (2010) (Bill Fawcett)
45. The Nebula Awards Showcase 2011 (2011) (Kevin J. Anderson)
46. Nebula Awards Showcase 2012 (2012) (James Patrick Kelly, John Kessel)
47. Nebula Awards Showcase 2013 (2013) (Catherine Asaro)
48. Nebula Awards Showcase 2014 (2014) (Kij Johnson)
49. Nebula Awards Showcase 2015 (2015) (Greg Bear)
50. Nebula Awards Showcase 2016 (2016) (Mercedes Lackey)
51. Nebula Awards Showcase 2017 (2017) (Julie E. Czerneda)
52. Nebula Awards Showcase 2018 (2018) (Jane Yolen)
53. Nebula Awards Showcase 2019 (2019) (Silvia Moreno-Garcia)
54. Nebula Awards Showcase 54 (2020) (Nibedita Sen)
55. Nebula Awards Showcase 55 (2021) (Catherynne M. Valente)
56. Nebula Awards Showcase 56 (2024) (SFWA, Inc.)
57. Nebula Awards Showcase 57 (2025) (Stephen Kotowych)
58. Nebula Awards Showcase 58 (2025) (Stephen Kotowych)
59. Nebula Awards Showcase 59 (2025) (Stephen Kotowych)
60. Nebula Awards Showcase 60 (2025) (Stephen Kotowych)
61. Nebula Awards Showcase 61 (2026) (Stephen Kotowych)
