= Nebula Awards Showcase 59 =

2025 anthology edited by Stephen Kotowych

- Cover of first edition
- Editor: Stephen Kotowych
- Cover artist: Lauren Raye Snow
- Language: English
- Series: Nebula Awards Showcase
- Genre: Science fiction and fantasy
- Publisher: SFWA, Inc.
- Publication date: 2025
- Publication place: United States
- Media type: Print (paperback), ebook
- Pages: 226
- ISBN: 978-1-958243-06-0
- Preceded by: Nebula Awards Showcase 58
- Followed by: Nebula Awards Showcase 60

Nebula Awards Showcase 59: The Year's Best Science Fiction and Fantasy is an anthology of science fiction and fantasy short works edited by Stephen Kotowych. It was first published in paperback and ebook by Science Fiction and Fantasy Writers of America, Inc. on March 25, 2025.

== Summary ==
The book collects pieces that won or were nominated for the Nebula Awards for novella, novelette, and short story for the year 2023 (presented in 2024), as well as other material. Not all nominated stories are included; in particular, all non-winning nominees for best novella are omitted.

== Contents ==
- "2023 Nebula Awards"
- Short Stories
  - "Tantie Merle and the Farmhand 4200" [best short story winner] (R. S. A. Garcia)
  - "Bad Doors" [best short story nominee] (John Wiswell)
  - "Once Upon a Time at the Oakmont" [best short story nominee] (P. A. Cornell)
  - "Window Boy" [best short story nominee] (Thomas Ha)
  - "Better Living Through Algorithms" [best short story nominee] (Naomi Kritzer)
  - "The Sound of Children Screaming" [best short story nominee] (Rachael K. Jones)
- Novelettes
  - "The Year Without Sunshine" [best novelette winner] (Naomi Kritzer)
  - "Saturday's Song" [best novelette nominee] (Wole Talabi)
  - "I Am AI" [best novelette nominee] (Ai Jiang)
  - "A Short Biography of a Conscious Chair" [best novelette nominee] (Renan Bernardo)
  - "Imagine: Purple-Haired Girl Shooting Down the Moon" [best novelette nominee] (Angela Liu)
  - "Six Versions of My Brother Found Under the Bridge" (Eugenia Triantafyllou)
- Novella
  - "Linghun" (excerpt) [best novella winner] (Ai Jiang)
- "Novella & Novel Finalists"
- "MultiMedia Award Finalists"
