= Nebula Awards Showcase 60 =

2025 anthology edited by Stephen Kotowych

- Cover of first edition
- Editor: Stephen Kotowych
- Cover artist: Lauren Raye Snow
- Language: English
- Series: Nebula Awards Showcase
- Genre: Science fiction and fantasy
- Publisher: SFWA, Inc.
- Publication date: 2025
- Publication place: United States
- Media type: Print (paperback), ebook
- Pages: 262
- ISBN: 978-1-958243-08-4
- Preceded by: Nebula Awards Showcase 59
- Followed by: Nebula Awards Showcase 61

Nebula Awards Showcase 60: The Year's Best Science Fiction and Fantasy is an anthology of science fiction and fantasy short works edited by Stephen Kotowych. It was first published in paperback and ebook by Science Fiction and Fantasy Writers of America, Inc. on June 9, 2025.

== Summary ==
The book collects pieces that won or were nominated for the Nebula Awards for novella, novelette, and short story for the year 2024 (presented in 2025), as well as other material. Not all nominated stories are included; in particular, all non-winning nominees for best novella are omitted.

== Contents ==
- "Introduction" (Stephen Kotowych)
- Short Stories
  - "Why Don't We Just Kill the Kid in the Omelas Hole" [best short story winner] (Isabel J. Kim)
  - "The V*mpire" [best short story nominee] (P. H. Lee)
  - "Five Views of the Planet Tartarus" [best short story nominee] (Rachael K. Jones)
  - "The Witch Trap" [best short story nominee] (Jennifer Hudak)
  - "Evan: A Remainder" [best short story nominee] (Jordan Kurella)
  - "We Will Teach You How to Read" [best short story nominee] (Caroline M. Yoachim)
- Novelettes
  - "Negative Scholarship on the Fifth State of Being" [best novelette winner] (A. W. Prihandita)
  - "Katya Vasilievna and the Second Drowning of Baba Rechka" [best novelette nominee] (Christine Hanolsy)
  - "Joanna's Bodies" [best novelette nominee] (Eugenia Triantafyllou)
  - "Another Girl Under the Iron Bell" [best novelette nominee] (Angela Liu)
  - "The Brotherhood of Montague St. Video" [best novelette nominee] (Thomas Ha)
  - "What Any Dead Thing Wants" [best novelette nominee] (Aimee Ogden)
  - "Loneliness Universe" [best novelette nominee] (Eugenia Triantafyllou)
- Novella
  - "The Dragonfly Gambit" (excerpt) [best novella winner] (A. D. Sui)
- "Novella & Novel Finalists"
- "MultiMedia Award Finalists"
