= Nebula Awards Showcase 58 =

2025 anthology edited by Stephen Kotowych

- Cover of first edition
- Editor: Stephen Kotowych
- Cover artist: Lauren Raye Snow
- Language: English
- Series: Nebula Awards Showcase
- Genre: Science fiction and fantasy
- Publisher: SFWA, Inc.
- Publication date: 2025
- Publication place: United States
- Media type: Print (paperback), ebook
- Pages: 235
- ISBN: 978-1-958243-04-6
- Preceded by: Nebula Awards Showcase 57
- Followed by: Nebula Awards Showcase 59

Nebula Awards Showcase 58: The Year's Best Science Fiction and Fantasy is an anthology of science fiction and fantasy short works edited by Stephen Kotowych. It was first published in paperback and ebook by Science Fiction and Fantasy Writers of America, Inc. on March 25, 2025.

== Summary ==
The book collects pieces that won or were nominated for the Nebula Awards for novella, novelette, and short story for the year 2022 (presented in 2023), as well as other material. Not all nominated stories are included; in particular, all non-winning nominees for best novella are omitted.

== Contents ==
- "2022 Nebula Awards"
- Short Stories
  - "Rabbit Test" [best short story winner] (Samantha Mills)
  - "D.I.Y." [best short story nominee] (John Wiswell)
  - "Give Me English" [best short story nominee] (Ai Jiang)
  - "Dick Pig" [best short story nominee] (Ian Muneshwar)
  - "Douen" [best short story nominee] (Suzan Palumbo)
  - "Destiny Delayed" [best short story nominee] (Ekpeki Oghenechovwe Donald)
- Novelettes
  - "If You Find Yourself Speaking to God, Address God With the Informal You" [best novelette winner] (John Chu)
  - "The Prince of Salt and the Ocean's Bargain" [best novelette nominee] (Natalia Theodoridou)
  - "A Dream of Electric Mothers" [best novelette nominee] (Wole Talabi)
  - "Two Hands, Wrapped in Gold" [best novelette nominee] (S. B. Divya)
  - "We Built This City" [best novelette nominee] (Marie Vibbert)
  - "Murder by Pixel: Crime and Responsibility in the Digital Darkness" (S. L. Huang)
- Novella
  - "Even Though I Knew the End" (excerpt) [best novella winner] (C. L. Polk)
- "Novella & Novel Finalists"
- "MultiMedia Award Finalists"
