= Nebula Awards Showcase 54 =

2020 science fiction and fantasy anthology

- Cover of first edition
- Editor: Nibedita Sen
- Language: English
- Series: Nebula Awards Showcase
- Genre: Science fiction and fantasy
- Publisher: SFWA, Inc.
- Publication date: 2020
- Publication place: United States
- Media type: Print (paperback), ebook
- Pages: ix, 469
- ISBN: 978-0-9828467-3-5
- OCLC: 1228902796
- Preceded by: Nebula Awards Showcase 2019
- Followed by: Nebula Awards Showcase 55

Nebula Awards Showcase 54 is an anthology of science fiction and fantasy short works edited by Bengali writer Nibedita Sen. It was first published in trade paperback by SFWA, Inc. in November 2020, followed by an ebook edition from the same publisher in December of the same year.

== Summary ==
The book collects pieces that won or were nominated for the Nebula Awards for best novel, novella, novelette and short story for the year 2018 (presented in 2019), as well as other material, together with an introduction by the editor. The novel winner, novella winner, and novella nominees are represented by excerpts. The non-winning nominees for best novel and one of the nominees for best short story (Richard Fox's "Going Dark") are omitted.

== Contents ==
- "Introduction" (Nibedita Sen)
- "It’s Dangerous to Go Alone" (Kate Dollarhyde)
- "Into the Spider-verse: A Classic Origin Story in Bold New Color" (Brandon O'Brien)
- "The Secret Lives of the Nine Negro Teeth of George Washington" [Best short story winner, 2019] (P. Djèlí Clark)
- "Interview for the End of the World" [Best short story nominee, 2019] (Rhett C. Bruno)
- "And Yet" [Best short story nominee, 2019] (A. T. Greenblatt)
- "A Witch’s Guide to Escape: A Practical Compendium of Portal Fantasies" [Best short story nominee, 2019] (Alix E. Harrow)
- "The Court Magician" [Best short story nominee, 2019] (Sarah Pinsker)
- "The Only Harmless Great Thing" [Best novelette winner, 2019] (Brooke Bolander)
- "The Last Banquet of Temporal Confections" [Best novelette nominee, 2019] (Tina Connolly)
- "An Agent of Utopia" [Best novelette nominee, 2019] (Andy Duncan)
- "The Substance of My Lives, The Accidents of Our Births" [Best novelette nominee, 2019] (José Pablo Iriarte)
- "The Rule of Three" [Best novelette nominee, 2019] (Lawrence M. Schoen)
- "Messenger" [Best novelette nominee, 2019] (R.R. Virdi & Yudhanjaya Wijeratne)
- Excerpt: "The Tea Master and the Detective" [Best novella winner, 2019] (Aliette de Bodard)
- Excerpt: "Fire Ant" [Best novella nominee, 2019] (Jonathan P. Brazee)
- Excerpt: "The Black God’s Drums" [Best novella nominee, 2019] (P. Djèlí Clark)
- Excerpt: "Alice Payne Arrives" [Best novella nominee, 2019] (Kate Heartfield)
- Excerpt: "Gods, Monsters, and the Lucky Peach" [Best novella nominee, 2019] (Kelly Robson)
- Excerpt: "Artificial Condition: The Murderbot Diaries" [Best novella nominee, 2019] (Martha Wells)
- Excerpt: The Calculating Stars [Best novel winner, 2019] (Mary Robinette Kowal)
- "Biographies"

== Reception ==
John ONeill on blackgate.com notes "The Nebula Awards Showcase is one of the most auspicious and long running anthology series in science fiction" and that "[t]his year's volume ... hews pretty close to tradition ... and contains as many of last year's Nebula Award winners and nominees as they could cram between two covers." He highlights the fact that "[i]t's edited by a rising star in the industry" and "is unusual in that it's the first to be published directly by SFWA (technically SFWA, Inc, which as far as I know was created solely to publish this book."
