= The V*mpire =

2024 short story by P. H. Lee

- Short story by P. H. Lee
- Illustrator: James Fenner
- Country: United States
- Language: English
- Genres: Horror; transgender literature

Publication
- Published in: Reactor
- Publication type: Online magazine
- Publication date: October 23, 2024
- Award: The Transfeminine Review's Reader's Choice Award for Outstanding Short Story (2024)

"The V*mpire" is a horror short story by P. H. Lee about a teenage trans girl on Tumblr who becomes the target of an abusive vampire. It was first published online by Reactor on October 23, 2024, illustrated by James Fenner and edited by Mal Frazier. An ebook edition was published the same day by Tor Books. The story has been included in the anthologies Some of the Best from Reactor: 2024 Edition and Nebula Awards Showcase 60.

A review by A. C. Wise for Apex Magazine described "The V*mpire" as dark and disturbing and praised its depiction of online toxicity and manipulation. The story won The Transfeminine Review's 2024 Reader's Choice Award for Outstanding Short Story and was a finalist for the Nebula Award for Best Short Story in 2024 and for the 2025 World Fantasy Award for Short Fiction. It was also a top ten finalist for the 2025 Locus Award for Best Short Story.

== Synopsis ==
Set in 2013, the story follows a fourteen-year-old who uses Tumblr to present herself as a girl and to take part in fandom communities. Amid arguments and callouts on her dashboard, she reblogs a post that frames refusing to invite vampires into one's home as prejudice, and she begins receiving hostile anonymous messages demanding public declarations of support.

After she refuses to share personal information with a vampire she has angered online, he escalates to threats of public denunciation. In panic, she gives him her home address. The vampire arrives in person and uses supernatural influence to control the narrator and her mother. He feeds on the narrator, subjects her to coercion and abuse, and pressures her to change her online identity and cut off contact with a Tumblr friend, Mags, who checks in on her wellbeing.

The narrator later finds her mother dead and is isolated in the house under the vampire's control. The vampire demands a public apology and self-denouncing posts as a condition for allowing her to return home. Mags arrives with others, reveals themself to be a werewolf, and their pack attacks and drives off the vampire. Mags takes the narrator away from the house, and the story ends with the narrator leaving with the werewolves.

== Reception ==
A review by A. C. Wise for Apex Magazine described "The V*mpire" as a dark and disturbing story and praised its contrast between bad-faith appeals to inclusiveness and the genuine care shown at the end when the protagonist reconnects with her community.

"The V*mpire" won The Transfeminine Review's 2024 Reader's Choice Award for Outstanding Short Story. It was also a finalist for the Nebula Award for Best Short Story in 2024 and for the 2025 World Fantasy Award for Short Fiction, and was a top ten finalist for the 2025 Locus Award for Best Short Story.

== Publication history ==
"The V*mpire" was published in Reactor on October 23, 2024. It was illustrated by James Fenner and edited by Mal Frazier. An ebook edition was simultaneously published by Tor Books.

The story was included in the anthologies Some of the Best from Reactor: 2024 Edition and Nebula Awards Showcase 60.

== See also ==
- Vampire literature
- Transgender literature
