= Seven Against Tomorrow =

Book by Stephen Kotowych

- Cover of first edition
- Author: Stephen Kotowych
- Cover artist: Kit Foster Design
- Language: English
- Genre: Speculative fiction short stories
- Publisher: Ansible Press
- Publication date: 2015
- Publication place: Canada
- Media type: Print (paperback), ebook
- Pages: 188
- ISBN: 978-0-9939375-0-7

Seven Against Tomorrow: Tales of the Fantastic is a collection of speculative fiction short stories by Stephen Kotowych. It was first published in trade paperback by Ansible Press in March 2015, followed by an ebook edition from the same publisher in April of the same year.

== Summary ==
The book contains seven stories, three previously unpublished, and a "bonus novelette" by the author, together with a preface, commentary on each story, and other bits of bibliographic apparatus.

== Contents ==
- "Preface"
- "Acknowledgments"
- "Borrowed Time" (from Under Cover of Darkness, Feb. 2007)
- "Saturn in G Minor" (from L. Ron Hubbard Presents Writers of the Future Volume XXIII, Aug. 2007)
- "Gagiid"
- "There Followed the Wind"
- "Come Forth by Day"
- "Cladistics" (from The Book of Exodi, May 2009)
- "Citius, Altius, Fortius" (from Tesseracts Eleven: Amazing Canadian Speculative Fiction, Nov. 2007)
- "Under the Shield" (from Orson Scott Card's Intergalactic Medicine Show #24, Aug. 2011)
- "About the Author"
- "Note to the Reader"
- "Publication Credits"
