= Welcome to the Medical Clinic at the Interplanetary Relay Station =

2016 short story by Caroline M. Yoachim

"Welcome to the Medical Clinic at the Interplanetary Relay Station │ Hours Since the Last Patient Death: 0" is a science fiction short story by Caroline M. Yoachim. It was first published in Lightspeed in March 2016.

== Synopsis ==
"Welcome to the Medical Clinic at the Interplanetary Relay Station" is a second-person narrative in the style of a gamebook, depicting a scenario in which an employee of a space station seeks medical care for an injury. At various points throughout the story, the reader is offered a choice as to what the employee should do; however, all choices lead to the employee's "horrible, painful death".

== Reception ==
"Welcome to the Medical Clinic at the Interplanetary Relay Station" was a finalist for the Nebula Award for Best Short Story of 2016. Kirkus Reviews felt that the story led to "hilarity", while Tangent Online called it "terrifically funny". Rocket Stack Rank found it to be "very silly", but considered this to be a negative.
