= Stephen Kotowych =

Canadian author

- Born: Canada
- Occupations: Author, editor
- Writing career
- Language: English
- Period: 2007-present
- Genre: Speculative fiction
- Notable awards: 2024-2026 Aurora Award for Best Related Work
- Website: kotowych.com

Stephen Kotowych is a Canadian author and editor of speculative fiction. active in the field since 2007.

== Biography ==
Stephen Kotowych worked for over fifteen years in the Canadian publishing industry before becoming a freelance writer and editor. He lives near Toronto with his family and reports enjoying guitar and tropical fish.

== Writing career ==
Kotowych has been publishing short stories since 2007. His works have been translated into a dozen languages. He has edited and published the Aurora Award-winning Year's Best Canadian Fantasy and Science Fiction series, as well as editing several volumes of Nebula Awards Showcase.

Kotowych's short fiction has appeared in various publications, including the periodicals Deep Magic, Factor Four Magazine, Interzone, Nova, On Spec, Orson Scott Card's InterGalactic Medicine Show, and StarShipSofa, and the anthologies Agents & Spies Short Stories: Anthology of New & Classic Tales, The Best of Deep Magic: Anthology One, The Book of Exodi, The Book of the Emissaries: An Animism Short Fiction Anthology, Caped: An Anthology of Superhero Tales, Deep Magic: Volume I, InterGalactic Medicine Show: Big Book of SF Novelettes, Intergalactic Rejects, L. Ron Hubbard Presents Writers of the Future Volume XXIII, Little Blue Marble 2023: World on Fire, Sunshine Superhighway: Solar Sailings, Supernatural Horror Short Stories, Tenebrous Antiquities: An Anthology of Historical Horror, Tesseracts Eleven: Amazing Canadian Speculative Fiction, Tesseracts Sixteen: Parnassus Unbound, and Under Cover of Darkness.

== Awards ==
Kotowych is a World Fantasy Award finalist and has won Canada's Aurora Award, Spain's Premi Ictineu, and the Writers of the Future Grand Prize.

== Bibliography ==
=== Short fiction ===
- "Borrowed Time" (2007)
- "Saturn in G Minor" (2007)
- "Citius, Altius, Fortius" (2007)
- "Cladistics" (2009)
- "Under the Shield" (2011)
- "A Time for Raven" (2011)
- "Come Forth by Day" (2015)
- "Gagiid" (2015)
- "There Followed the Wind" (2015)
- "Super Frenemies" (2015)
- "Of His Wondrous Guile Sing, O Muse" (2016)
- "The Waxing Disquiet" (2017) (with Tony Pi)
- "The Murmur of Its Name" (2017)
- "The Book of Elevated Things" (2023)
- "I Think That I Shall Never See" (2023)
- "Waiting for the Iceman" (2024)
- "The Festival of Toxcatl" (2024)
- "For the Rectitude of Our Intentions" (2025)
- "The Billy Goat's Bluff" (2025)

=== Collections ===
- Seven Against Tomorrow: Tales of the Fantastic (2015)

=== Anthologies edited ===
- Game On! (2023) (with Tony Pi)

==== Nebula Awards Showcase series ====
- Nebula Awards Showcase 57 (2025)
- Nebula Awards Showcase 58 (2025)
- Nebula Awards Showcase 59 (2025)
- Nebula Awards Showcase 60 (2025)
- Nebula Awards Showcase 61 (2026)

==== Year's Best Canadian Fantasy and Science Fiction series ====
- Year's Best Canadian Fantasy and Science Fiction: Volume One (2023)
- Year's Best Canadian Fantasy and Science Fiction: Volume Two (2024)
- Year's Best Canadian Fantasy and Science Fiction: Volume Three (2025)
