= Nebula Award Stories 9 =

1974 anthology edited by Kate Wilhelm

- First edition (UK)
- Author: edited by Kate Wilhelm
- Language: English
- Series: Nebula Award Stories
- Genre: Science fiction short stories
- Publisher: Gollancz 1974 (UK); Harper & Row 1975 (US)
- Publication place: United Kingdom
- Media type: Print (hardcover)
- Pages: 287 pp.
- ISBN: 0-575-01899-2
- Preceded by: Nebula Award Stories Eight
- Followed by: Nebula Award Stories 10

Nebula Award Stories 9 is an anthology of award winning science fiction short works edited by Kate Wilhelm. It was first published in the United Kingdom in hardcover by Gollancz in November 1974. The first American edition was published by Harper & Row in January 1975. Paperback editions followed from Corgi Books in the U.K. in November 1976, and Bantam Books in the U.S. in July 1978. The American editions bore the variant title Nebula Award Stories Nine. The book has also been published in German.

== Summary ==
The book collects pieces published in 1973 that won or were nominated for the Nebula Awards for novella, novelette and short story for the year 1974 and nonfiction pieces related to the awards, together with an introduction by the editor. Several of the non-winning pieces nominated for Best Novella, Novelette and Best Short Story were omitted, and one story not nominated for any of the awards was included.

== Contents ==
- "Introduction" (Kate Wilhelm)
- "The Death of Dr. Island" [Best Novella winner, 1974] (Gene Wolfe)
- "Shark" [Best Short Story nominee, 1974] (Edward Bryant)
- "With Morning Comes Mistfall" [Best Short Story nominee, 1974] (George R. R. Martin)
- "The Future of Science: Prometheus, Apollo, Athena" (Ben Bova)
- "Of Mist, and Grass, and Sand" [Best Novelette winner, 1974] (Vonda N. McIntyre)
- "The Deathbird" [Best Novelette nominee, 1974] (Harlan Ellison)
- "A Thing of Beauty" [Best Short Story nominee, 1974] (Norman Spinrad)
- "Love Is the Plan the Plan Is Death" [Best Short Story winner, 1974] (James Tiptree, Jr.)
- "1973: The Year in Science Fiction" (Damon Knight)
- "The Childhood of the Human Hero" (Carol Emshwiller)
- "The Nebula Winners, 1965-1973"
- "The Authors"

== Reception ==
Martin Hillman, surveying several then-current science fiction anthologies in the Tribune, noted "there are jewels too, of course, in Nebula Award Stories 9, edited by Kate Wilhelm (Gollancz, £3), including those by Gene Wolfe, James Tiptree and the remarkable Carol Emshwiller."

The anthology was also reviewed by Frederick Patten in Delap's F & SF Review, May 1975, Philippa Grove-Stephensen in Paperback Parlour, February 1977, and David A. Truesdale in the Tribune, Blackpool, Science Fiction Review, January-February 1979.

== Awards ==
The book placed fifth in the 1975 Locus Poll Award for Best Reprint Anthology.
