= Karen Osborne =

American author

- Born: Niskayuna, New York
- Occupation: Author
- Writing career
- Genre: speculative fiction
- Website: www.karenosborne.com

Karen Osborne is an American author of fantasy and science fiction, active in the field since 2008, with most of her work appearing since 2016.

== Biography ==
Karen Osborne was born in Niskayuna, New York. She graduated from Niskayuna High School and attended Nazareth College near Rochester, New York, studying English, communication and information design. Her first job was as a packer of Tupperware orders; she has been an English teacher, wedding videographer, cashier, bookseller, and press release writer. She has worked for community weekly newspapers in New York, Florida, and Maryland as a reporter, photographer, editor, and website manager, winning awards for hews and opinion writing.

Osborne is currently a full-time writer living in Baltimore, Maryland with, as she writes, "two violins, an autoharp, five cameras, two cats, and a family."

Before the pandemic she played fiddle in the Homespun Ceilidh Band, based in the DC/Maryland area and electric violin for the fusion group Circle of Confusion, as well as emceeing the Baltimore-based Charm City Spec reading series and running 5k races.

== Literary career ==
Osborne's earliest attempt to sell fiction was a spec script for Star Trek: Voyager, written as a teen with a friend. She framed the rejection letter. She attended the 2016 Viable Paradise workshop and the 2017 Clarion Writers' Workshop at UCSD. Her work has appeared in various periodicals, webzines and podcasts, including Aoife's Kiss, Beneath Ceaseless Skies, Clarkesworld, Electric Spec, Escape Pod, Fireside Quarterly, Future Science Fiction Digest, and Uncanny Magazine, and the anthologies The Best Science Fiction of the Year: Volume 5, Event Horizon 2018, The Long List Anthology: Volume 6, Nebula Awards Showcase 55, and Robot Dinosaur Fiction!.

== Recognition ==
Osborne was a nominee but not a finalist for the 2019 John W. Campbell Award for Best New Writer. Her story "The Dead, in Their Uncontrollable Power" was nominated for the 2020 Nebula Award for Best Short Story, placed 17th in the 2020 Locus Poll Award for Best Short Story, was a finalist for the 2020 Sturgeon Award for Best Short Science Fiction, and was a nominee but not a finalist for the 2020 Hugo Award for Best Short Story. Her novel Architects of Memory was nominated for the 2020 Bisexual Book Award for speculative fiction, one of 10 finalists for the 2021 Locus Poll Award for Best First Novel, and was nominated for the 2021 Compton Crook Award for Best First Novel.

== Bibliography ==
=== Memory War series ===
- Architects of Memory (978-1-250-21547-5, Tor, Sep. 2020)
- Engines of Oblivion (978-1-250-21550-5, Tor, Feb. 2021)

=== Short fiction ===
- "Retirement" (from Aoife's Kiss #7, Dec. 2008)
- "Gazer" (from Electric Spec v. 11, iss. 4, November 30, 2016)
- "An Equal Share of the Bone" (from Escape Pod #603, November 23, 2017)
- "Even to the Teeth" (from Robot Dinosaur Fiction!, July 6, 2018)
- "Dollhouse" (from Escape Pod #641, August 16, 2018)
- "The Bodice, the Hem, the Woman, Death" (from Beneath Ceaseless Skies #263, October 25, 2018)
- "The Blanched Bones, the Tyrant Wind" (from Fireside Quarterly, Jan. 2019)
- "The Dead, in Their Uncontrollable Power" (from Uncanny Magazine iss. 27, Mar./Apr. 2019)
- "The Two-Bullet War" (from Beneath Ceaseless Skies #278, May 23, 2019)
- "Cratered" (from Future Science Fiction Digest iss. 3, Jun. 2019)
- "Promises We Made Under a Brick-Dark Sky" (from Clarkesworld iss. 178, Jul. 2021)
- "Osteogenesis" (from Kaleidotrope iss. 67, Spring 2025)

=== Nonfiction ===
- "The Big Idea: Karen Osborne" (on John Scalzi's Whatever, September 21, 2020)
- "Five Books Where Assuming Aliens Are Just Like You Might Get You Killed" (on Tor.Com, September 21, 2020)

=== Interviews ===
- Wise, A. C. "An Interview with Karen Osborne", September 8, 2020.
- "Interview with Karen Osborne" (at Thunder Bay Public Library's Off The Shelf, January 6, 2021)
- Sorg, Arley. "Thrilling to the Harmony: A Conversation with Karen Osborne" in Clarkesworld, Feb. 2021.
