= Nebula Award Stories 11 =

1976 anthology edited by Ursula K. Le Guin

- First edition (UK)
- Editor: Ursula K. Le Guin
- Language: English
- Series: Nebula Award Stories
- Genre: Science fiction
- Publisher: Gollancz 1976 (UK); Harper & Row 1977 (US)
- Publication place: United Kingdom
- Media type: Print (hardcover)
- Pages: 255
- ISBN: 0-575-02151-9
- Preceded by: Nebula Award Stories 10
- Followed by: Nebula Winners Twelve

Nebula Award Stories 11 is an anthology of science fiction short works edited by Ursula K. Le Guin. It was first published in the United Kingdom in hardcover by Gollancz in November 1976. The first American edition was published in hardcover by Harper & Row in February 1977. Paperback editions followed from Corgi in the U.K. in July 1978, and Bantam Books in the U.S. in August 1978. The American editions bore the variant title Nebula Award Stories Eleven.

== Summary ==
The book collects pieces published in 1974 and 1975 that won or were nominated for the Nebula Awards for novella, novelette and short story for the year 1976 and nonfiction pieces related to the awards, together with an introduction by the editor. Most of the non-winning pieces nominated for the awards were omitted.

== Contents ==
- "Introduction" (Ursula K. Le Guin)
- "Acknowledgements" (Ursula K. Le Guin)
- "Catch That Zeppelin!" [Best Short Story winner, 1976] (Fritz Leiber)
- "End Game" (Joe Haldeman)
- "1975: The Year in Science Fiction, or Let's Hear It for the Decline and Fall of the Science Fiction Empire!" (Peter Nicholls)
- "Home is the Hangman" [Best Novella winner, 1976] (Roger Zelazny)
- "Child of All Ages" [Best Short Story nominee, 1976] (P. J. Plauger)
- "Potential and Actuality in Science Fiction" (Vonda N. McIntyre)
- "Shatterday" [Best Short Story nominee, 1976] (Harlan Ellison)
- "San Diego Lightfoot Sue" [Best Novelette winner, 1976] (Tom Reamy)
- "Time Deer" [Best Short Story nominee, 1976] (Craig Strete)
- "The Nebula Winners, 1965/1975"

== Reception ==
Kirkus Reviews assessed the anthology as having "some good things" that "don't add up to a balance of approaches and themes." Judgment of individual pieces was mixed; of the non-fiction, Nicholl's survey of the year was called "nice but slapdash, and McIntyre's essay on the state of the art "shallow ruminations." In regard to the fiction, the reviewer characterized Plauger's piece as "a wry and dry turn," Ellison's as worked out with "negligent finesse," Zelazny's as having a "promising" start but ending "with something of a sugary thud," Leiber's as an "ironic ... exercise," Strete's as a "deft little fable," and Reamy's as a "sad, charming story."

P. J. Stevens in Australian SF News writes "I shouldn't have to sell you on this volume, you should be up and running to the nearest bookstore to buy a copy of this collection of the best sf for 1975."

The book was also reviewed by John Clute in Vector 79, January 1977, Floyd Kemske in Galileo iss. 4, July 1977, Joe Sanders in Delap's F & SF Review v. 3, no. 7, July 1977, and Sneja Gunew in SF Commentary no. 57, November 1979.

== Awards ==
The anthology placed tenth in the 1977 Locus Poll Award for Best Anthology.
