= Nebula Award Stories Seventeen =

1983 anthology edited by Joe Haldeman

- Cover of first edition
- Editor: Joe Haldeman
- Cover artist: Lucy Albanese
- Language: English
- Series: The Nebula Awards
- Genre: Science fiction
- Publisher: Holt, Rinehart and Winston
- Publication date: 1983
- Publication place: United States
- Media type: Print (hardcover)
- Pages: 291
- ISBN: 0-03-063528-4
- OCLC: 09752245
- Preceded by: Nebula Award Stories Sixteen
- Followed by: The Nebula Awards #18

Nebula Award Stories Seventeen is an anthology of award winning science fiction short works edited by Joe Haldeman. It was first published in hardcover by Holt, Rinehart and Winston in August 1983; a paperback edition was issued by Ace Books in June 1985 under the variant title Nebula Award Stories 17.

== Summary ==
The book collects pieces that won or were nominated for the Nebula Awards for novel, novella, novelette and short story for the year 1982 and a couple nonfiction pieces related to the awards, together with the two Rhysling Award-winning poems for 1981, an introduction by the editor and appendices. Not all nominees for the various awards are included, and "The Bone Flute," winner of the short story award, was omitted because its author, Lisa Tuttle, had refused the award and declined to allow the story's inclusion.

== Contents ==
- "Introduction" (Joe Haldeman)
- "1981 and Counting" [essay] (Algis Budrys)
- "Venice Drowned" [Best Short Story nominee, 1982] (Kim Stanley Robinson)
- "The Quiet" [Best Short Story nominee, 1982] (George Florance-Guthridge)
- "Going Under" [Best Short Story nominee, 1982] (Jack Dann)
- "Johnny Mnemonic" [Best Short Story nominee, 1982] (William Gibson)
- "Films and Television—1981" [essay] (Baird Searles)
- "Zeke" [Best Short Story nominee, 1982] (Timothy Robert Sullivan)
- "The Saturn Game" [Best Novella winner, 1982] (Poul Anderson)
- "Disciples" [Best Short Story nominee, 1982] (Gardner Dozois)
- "The Quickening" [Best Novelette winner, 1982] (Michael Bishop)
- "The Pusher" [Best Short Story nominee, 1982] (John Varley)
- The Claw of the Conciliator (excerpt) [Best Novel winner, 1982] (Gene Wolfe)
- "Meeting Place" [Rhysling Award, Short Poem winner, 1981] (Ken Duffin)
- "On Science Fiction" [Rhysling Award, Long Poem winner, 1981] (Tom Disch)
- "Appendices"

== Reception ==
Algis Budrys in The Magazine of Fantasy & Science Fiction writes "I was transfixed by this anthology," calling it "a groundbreaker or at the very least a stele erected at the spot where ground was smitten." He feels that the book "contains some uncommonly good stories, even for an anthology drawn from nominations to and winners of the annual awards of merit given by the Science Fiction Writers of America." While nodding favorably at the nonfiction pieces, including his own contribution, as "the usual sort of furniture," he notes "it's the fiction that makes these engines churn, and this one has travelled far more than a year's worth on its 365-day run." He highlights the Robinson, Dann, Gibson and Bishop pieces "the expertly-done, absolutely unconventional, stunningly effective stories, ... speaking of where the cutting edge has gone," with the Wolfe, Varley, Dozois and Florance-Guthridge pieces "[a]mong top-flight work that is half a step closer to what you've seen before." "Certainly," Budrys notes, "Haldeman has taken his editorial responsibilities seriously and with uncommon innovation." He praises excerpting Wolfe's novel and including the Rysling Award winners, calling each "an imaginative idea," and even "the omission of the actual short story winner" from the book merely "leaves me with the firm impression that he and his colleagues are easily in charge of it." (He is evidently unaware of the actual circumstances behind the omission.)

The anthology was also reviewed by Larry D. Woods in Fantasy Review no. 64, January 1984.

== Awards ==
The anthology placed sixteenth in the 1982 Locus Poll Award for Best Anthology.
