= Nebula Award Stories Sixteen =

1982 anthology edited by Jerry Pournelle and John F. Carr

- First edition (US)
- Author: edited by Jerry Pournelle and John F. Carr
- Cover artist: Lucy Castelluccio
- Language: English
- Series: The Nebula Awards
- Genre: Science fiction short stories
- Publisher: Holt, Rinehart and Winston 1982 (US); W. H. Allen 1983 (UK)
- Publication place: United States
- Media type: Print (hardcover, paperback)
- Pages: 286
- ISBN: 0-03-059787-0
- Preceded by: Nebula Winners Fifteen
- Followed by: Nebula Award Stories Seventeen

Nebula Award Stories Sixteen is an anthology of award winning science fiction short works edited by Jerry Pournelle and John F. Carr. It was first published in hardcover by Holt, Rinehart and Winston in August 1982; a paperback edition was issued by Bantam Books in September 1983. British editions were issued by W. H. Allen (hardcover) and Star (paperback) in 1983; the latter under the variant title Nebula Winners Sixteen.

== Summary ==
The book collects pieces that won or were nominated for the Nebula Awards for novella, novelette and short story for the year 1981 and a few other pieces related to the awards, together with an introduction by Pournelle and appendices. Not all nominees for the various awards are included.

== Contents ==
- "Introduction" (Jerry Pournelle)
- "Grotto of the Dancing Deer" [Best Short Story winner, 1981] (Clifford D. Simak)
- "Why Is There So Little Science in Literature?" [essay] (Gregory Benford)
- "Ginungagap" [Best Novelette nominee, 1981] (Michael Swanwick)
- "Unicorn Tapestry" [Best Novella winner, 1981] (Suzy McKee Charnas)
- "1980: Whatever Weirdness Lingers" [essay] (Michael Glyer)
- "Rautavaara's Case" [short story] (Philip K. Dick)
- "1980: The Year in Fantastic Films" [essay] (Bill Warren)
- "The Ugly Chickens" [Best Novelette winner, 1981] (Howard Waldrop)
- "What Did 1980 Mean?" [essay] (Algis Budrys)
- "Secrets of the Heart" [Best Short Story nominee, 1981] (Charles L. Grant)
- "Appendixes"

== Reception ==
Publishers Weekly calls the volume "a valuable as well as an enjoyable book," singling out the Charnas ("calmly realistic and riveting"), Waldrop ("delightful") and Simak pieces for comment, while assessing those of Grant, Swanwick and Dick as "[g]ood work." The nonfiction pieces are called "useful," providing "[v]ariety and balance."

School Library Journal found the quality of the anthology's stories and essays "uneven," but noted that "[l]ibraries aiming for comprehensive science-fiction coverage will want [it] regardless." The films review and retrospective listings of Nebula and Hugo winners were rated "[a]mong the assets" of the book.

The anthology was also reviewed by Susan L. Nickerson in Library Journal v. 107, Aug. 1, 1982, and Steven Lehman in Science Fiction & Fantasy Book Review no. 11, January/February 1983.

== Awards ==
The book placed eleventh in the 1983 Locus Poll Award for Best Anthology.
