= Someone You Can Build a Nest In =

2024 novel by John Wiswell

- Author: John Wiswell
- Genre: Fantasy
- Published: April 2, 2024
- Publisher: DAW Books
- Publication place: United States
- Pages: 320 (hardcover)
- Awards: 2024 Nebula Award for Best Novel
- ISBN: 9780756418854

Someone You Can Build a Nest In is a 2024 fantasy novel by John Wiswell, the author's debut novel. The novel received critical praise; it won the 2024 Nebula Award for Best Novel and 2025 Locus Award for Best First Novel, and was a finalist for the 2025 Hugo Award for Best Novel.

== Plot ==
Shesheshen is a shapeshifting monster living in an abandoned manor. She is awakened from hibernation by three human monster hunters. She eats their leader, Catharsis Wulfyre. The other two humans escape. In the fight, Shesheshen is shot with a crossbow bolt coated in rosemary, which is poisonous to her. Disguised as a human, she travels to the nearby village of Underlook in search of food. She is recognized by a surviving monster hunter. She flees on horseback, but is chased over a cliff and severely injured by the fall.

Shesheshen is rescued by a woman named Homily. Shesheshen is smitten with her; she decides that the human woman would be a perfect person to lay her eggs in. Shesheshen's species is born after eating their way free from a living host. The two quickly fall in love, although this means different things to each of them. Before Shesheshen can confess her identity, Homily reveals a secret of her own. Homily's surname is Wulfyre; Catharsis Wulfyre was her brother, and her mother is the Baroness Wulfyre. Homily tells Shesheshen that the Wulfyre family has been cursed by the monster and asks her to help hunt the monster down. In truth, Shesheshen has never cursed anyone; however, she agrees to help Homily hunt the monster.

Shesheshen meets Homily's family, including her mother and her sisters Epigram and Ode. Homily is abused by her family, angering Shesheshen. Shesheshen realizes that human man she hatched from was Homily's father. The Baroness then killed Shesheshen's mother as revenge. The Wulfyres, their mercenaries, and Shesheshen embark on the monster hunt. A new monster appears and eats Ode; Shesheshen realizes that she has accidentally created offspring through asexual reproduction.

Shesheshen stabs the Baroness and attempts to kill her. She expects the Baroness to die, but learns that the Baroness is also a shapeshifter. This creature is actually Shesheshen's mother, who killed the original Baroness years ago and has been masquerading as human. The false Baroness asks for Shesheshen's egg sac, which will extend her lifespan dramatically.

Shesheshen is wounded but escapes from the Baroness. Shesheshen returns to camp, where she confesses her true identity to a woman in Homily's tent. Unfortunately for Shesheshen, this is actually Epigram disguised as Homily. Epigram shoots Shesheshen with a rosemary crossbow bolt and reveals Shesheshen's true identity to Homily. Instead of killing Shesheshen, Homily kills Epigram.

Shesheshen and Homily plan to kill the false Baroness. Shesheshen disguises herself as Epigram. She poisons her own egg sac with rosemary and feeds it to the Baroness. Together, she and Homily kill the false Baroness. Homily and Shesheshen raise Shesheshen's offspring together, naming it Epilogue.

== Major themes ==
Alex Brown of Reactor noted the following regarding the novel's exploration of neurodiversity:

Shesheshen is a monster both literally and metaphorically. Her very existence violates social norms. She can "pass" as "normal", or mask, if you will, but only by mimicking other people and practicing their behaviors. I’m neurodivergent and so much of Shesheshen’s experiences felt eerily familiar. The pragmatism, the frustration at not being able to figure out what someone actually wants versus what they say they want, the feeling like you’re pretending at being a certain kind of person when you’re really something else entirely. At times, she is overwhelmed by sensations that humans don’t seem to notice, and she reacts to things in a way that some humans would find cold and emotionless but is for her just the logical response to an illogical situation.

Brown, who is asexual and aromantic, also notes that the novel explores the concept of romance through an asexual lens. The review states that while "Someone You Can Build a Nest In is romantic, it’s an aromantic version of romance rather than an alloromantic one. I might even call it queerplatonic."

== Reception and awards ==
Kristi Chadwick of Library Journal gave the novel a starred review, recommending it for fans of T. Kingfisher. Chadwick wrote that "Wiswell raises the bar on the outcast as protagonist." According to the review, "Wiswell's debut is the ultimate monster slayer story, if the monster is just a misunderstood creature searching for love." Liz Bourke of Locus also compared the novel to the works of Kingfisher, but noted that "Wiswell has a voice and an energy all of his own: The novel is an absolute bloody delight." Bourke praised the characters of Shesheshen and Homily as well as the novel's thematic content, noting that "issues around parenthood and families and reproduction are a serious theme that runs through this work." Lisa Tuttle of The Guardian wrote that the novel offers "an outsider’s critical view of human attitudes and morality." Tuttle concluded that the novel "is a heartfelt fable about disability and the possibility of reconciling conflicting needs through love and understanding."

Kirkus Reviews found that Shesheshen is an "interesting narrator", writing that "seeing her find ways to describe and parse new emotions like friendship and love is often more interesting than the romance itself." The review found that the novel was inventive and boundary-pushing, but would not appeal to all readers. It concluded by stating that Someone You Can Build a Nest In is a "wonderfully weird horror romance that requires an acquired taste and a strong stomach." Publishers Weekly wrote that the novel "confronts familial abuse, otherness, and healing from trauma." The review criticized the "occasionally shaky worldbuilding [which] muddles the message," but concluded that "there's a potent emotional core to this blood-soaked tale" and "readers looking for dark and distinctive romantic fantasy will want to check this out."

Alex Brown of Reactor wrote that the novel is "weird and unsettling, and it plays with elements of horror and romance without fully committing to those genres," which in Brown's opinion would make the novel challenging to sell. The same review felt that the plot and epilogue were weaker than the novel's premise, but concluded that the novel was a "winner".

Year	Award	Category	Result	Ref.
2024	Nebula Award	Novel	Won	
2025	Compton Crook Award	—	Finalist	
2025	Hugo Award	Novel	Finalist	
2025	Locus Award	First Novel	Won	
