= The Luminous Dead =

2019 novel by Caitlin Starling

- Author: Caitlin Starling
- Audio read by: Adenrele Ojo
- Language: English
- Genre: Science fiction, horror
- Published: Print (paperback), ebook, audiobook)
- Publisher: Harper Voyager
- Publication date: 2019
- Publication place: United States
- Pages: 432 pages
- ISBN: 0062846906 Paperback first edition

The Luminous Dead is a 2019 sci-fi horror novel written by Caitlin Starling and is her first published novel. The book was released to positive reviews from critics and was nominated for the Bram Stoker Award for Best First Novel.

== Synopsis ==
The novel predominantly centers on two characters, cave diver Gyre Price and her handler, Em. Gyre has taken on the task of exploring a dangerous cave system that is partially underwater. It is also home to the Tunnelers, strange alien creatures capable of instantly killing any they come across. While she has some limited experience doing this job, Gyre has lied about her job history in order to secure the large paycheck that comes with spending weeks mapping out the cave while inside a specialized caving suit, unable to take it off or eat conventional food. During this she is watched by her handler Em, who is tasked with ensuring that Gyre remains safe and calm via the administration of drugs or other methods. Unbeknownst to Gyre, Em has secrets of her own, the first of which is that she is the only handler on site—a job typically handled by multiple people to avoid handler burnout and allow for sleep.

== Development ==
When writing The Luminous Dead Starling wanted the story to rely on more than "alliances and subsequent betrayals to keep the landscape ever-changing", as she had "fewer of the traditional tools available to ratchet up the tension" due to the setting and limited cast. Starling chose to incorporate other restrictions such as the lack of colors due to a reliance on sonar-based reconstructions and the need for Gyre to continuously wear a suit that would restrict her smell and touch. This allowed Starling to explore the question of "what happens if one of her computer-simulated senses makes different interpretations of the world around her than her brain would have on its own?". Starling also utilized information on feeding tubes and colostomy bags that she gained from a family member diagnosed with colon cancer, as this would provide an "elegant solution" and "thanks to its specificity, far grosser and prone to specific complications during the course of the book."

== Release ==
The Luminous Dead was first published in paperback and ebook format in the United States on April 2, 2019 through Harper Voyager. An audiobook adaptation narrated by Adenrele Ojo was released simultaneously through HarperAudio. Harper Voyager would later release the novel in the United Kingdom on May 16 of the same year.

The novel is Starling's first published novel.

== Reception ==
The Luminous Dead received praise for its atmosphere and setting from outlets such as NPR and Locus. Writing for Locus, Tim Pratt noted that the "prickly relationship" between Gyre and Em was "the heart of the book – a spiky combination of dependence, mutual suspicion, frustration, and fleeting moments of connection." This relationship was also highlighted by other reviewers such as Nibedita Sen for Strange Horizons, who wrote that it was very human as it was "a fascinating, nuanced exploration of what kind of bond—if any—can form between two queer women under conditions of constant stress, terror, and isolation, and with an extreme power differential thrown into the mix. The result is neither good nor bad, it just is: complicated, messy, potentially unhealthy, occasionally touching, sliding back and forth between hurt, betrayal, and attempts at recompense."
