= Nebula Winners Fourteen =

1980 anthology edited by Frederik Pohl

- First edition (US)
- Author: edited by Frederik Pohl
- Cover artist: Robin Malkin
- Language: English
- Series: The Nebula Awards
- Genre: Science fiction short stories
- Publisher: Harper & Row 1980 (US); W. H. Allen 1981 (UK)
- Publication place: United States
- Media type: Print (hardcover)
- Pages: xi, 2593 pp.
- ISBN: 0-06-013382-1
- Preceded by: Nebula Winners Thirteen
- Followed by: Nebula Winners Fifteen

Nebula Winners Fourteen is an anthology of award winning science fiction short works edited by Frederik Pohl. It was first published in hardcover by Harper & Row in August 1980. The first British edition was published in hardcover by W. H. Allen in April 1981. Paperback editions followed from Star in the U.K. in March 1982 and Bantam Books in the U.S. in July 1982.

== Summary ==
The book collects pieces that won or were nominated for the Nebula Awards for novel, novella, novelette and short story for the year 1979 and a few other pieces related to the awards, together with a piece by 1979 Grand Master award winner L. Sprague de Camp and an introduction by the editor. Not all nominees for the various awards are included.

== Contents ==
- "Introduction: A Guide to the Perplexed" (Frederik Pohl)
- "The Persistence of Vision" [Best Novella winner, 1979] (John Varley)
- "Stone" [Best Short Story winner, 1979] (Edward Bryant)
- "A Glow of Candles, a Unicorn's Eye" [Best Novelette winner, 1979] (Charles L. Grant)
- "Science Fiction: 1938" [essay] (Isaac Asimov)
- "The Future of Science Fiction" [essay] (Norman Spinrad)
- "An Excerpt from Dreamsnake" [Best Novel winner, 1979] (Vonda N. McIntyre)
- "Little Green Men from Afar" [essay] (L. Sprague de Camp)
- "Cassandra" [Best Short Story nominee, 1979] (C. J. Cherryh)
- "Seven American Nights" [Best Novella nominee, 1979] (Gene Wolfe)
- "The Nebula Winners, 1965-1978"

== Reception ==
John ONeill, reviewing the book in 2018 on blackgate.com, writes it "has reminded me just how outstanding the Nebula anthologies were, and are, year after year. This one, for example, includes the three 1978 Nebula short fiction award winners, plus a 30-page excerpt from the winning novel ... [b]ut it also includes some superb nominees, as selected by Pohl, including C. J. Cherryh’s Hugo Award-winning short story 'Cassandra,' and Gene Wolfe’s massive 60-page novella 'Seven American Nights.' I imagine Pohl got a lot of grief for cramming two long novellas into a slender paperback, displacing a lot of award-nominated short fiction in the process, but the years have proven the astuteness of his choice. 'Seven American Nights' is one of the most acclaimed stories of the 70s, still discussed and enjoyed today, whereas the winner in the novella category, Varley’s 'The Persistence of Vision,' is considered by many to be overrated (including by me.)"

The anthology was also reviewed by Pascal Thomas (1982) in Paperback Inferno v. 6, no. 2, October 1982.

== Awards ==
The anthology placed twenty-first in the 1981 Locus Poll Award for Best Anthology.
