= Nebula Winners Twelve =

1978 anthology edited by Gordon R. Dickson

- Dust-jacket of first edition
- Editor: Gordon R. Dickson
- Illustrator: Kim Kasow
- Language: English
- Series: Nebula Winners
- Genre: Science fiction
- Publisher: Harper & Row
- Publication date: 1978
- Publication place: United States
- Media type: Print (Hardcover)
- Pages: xiv, 242
- ISBN: 0-06-011078-3
- Preceded by: Nebula Award Stories 11
- Followed by: Nebula Winners Thirteen

Nebula Winners Twelve is an anthology of science fiction short stories edited by Gordon R. Dickson. It was first published in hardcover by Harper & Row in February 1978, and reprinted in December of the same year. A paperback edition followed from Bantam Books in April 1979.

== Summary ==
The book collects pieces published in 1975 and 1976 that won the Nebula Awards for novella, novelette and short story for the year 1977 and nonfiction pieces related to the awards, together with an introduction by the editor. Most of the non-winning pieces nominated for the awards were omitted.

The included stories had originally appeared in the magazines The Magazine of Fantasy & Science Fiction, Analog, and the anthologies Dystopian Visions, edited by Roger Elwood, Stellar #2, edited by Judy-Lynn del Rey and Aurora: Beyond Equality, edited by Vonda McIntyre & Susan Anderson.

== Contents ==
- "Introduction" (Gordon R. Dickson)
- "A Crowd of Shadows" [Best Short Story winner, 1977] (C. L. Grant)
- "Breath's a Ware That Will Not Keep" [Best Short Story nominee, 1977] (Thomas F. Monteleone)
- "Tricentennial" [Best Short Story nominee, 1977] (Joe Haldeman)
- "In the Bowl" [Best Novelette nominee, 1977] (John Varley)
- "Science Fiction in the Marketplace" [essay] (Algirdas Jonas Budrys)
- "The Academic Viewpoint" [essay] (James Gunn)
- "The Bicentennial Man" [Best Novelette winner, 1977] (Isaac Asimov)
- "Houston, Houston, Do You Read?" [Best Novella winner, 1977] (James Tiptree, Jr.)
- "Nebula Awards, 1975, 1976: Win, Place, and Show" [essay] (uncredited)

== Reception ==
Paul Walker in Galaxy Science Fiction finds the book "the most tolerable" of "the Nebula Award volumes I have read," with Dickson's introduction "intelligent and interesting, if typical of these anthologies." He singles out the Varley and Asimov stories as "excellent" and the Budrys and Gunn essays as "equally good." But he deems Grant's story "less than first-rate," "a typical 'award-winner,'" with "neither the theme nor the characters ... in any way remarkable," holds "the same is true, to a lesser extent," of the Haldeman and Monteleone stories, and is completely dismissive of Tiptree's "'Houston, Houston, Do You Read?'—which I could not."

The volume was also reviewed by Stephen W. Potts in Science Fiction & Fantasy Book Review, July 1979.

== Awards ==
The anthology placed fourteenth in the 1979 Locus Poll Award for Best Anthology.
