= Nebula Award Stories 10 =

1975 anthology edited by James Gunn

- First edition (UK)
- Author: edited by James Gunn
- Language: English
- Series: Nebula Award Stories
- Genre: Science fiction short stories
- Publisher: Gollancz (UK); Harper & Row (US)
- Publication date: 1975
- Publication place: United Kingdom
- Media type: Print (hardcover)
- Pages: 255 pp.
- ISBN: 0-575-02059-8
- Preceded by: Nebula Award Stories 9
- Followed by: Nebula Award Stories 11

Nebula Award Stories 10 is an anthology of award-winning science fiction short works edited by James Gunn. It was first published in the United Kingdom in hardcover by Gollancz in November 1975. The first American edition was published in hardcover by Harper & Row in December of the same year. Paperback editions followed from Berkley Medallion in the U.S. in December 1976, and Corgi in the U.K. in June 1977. The American editions bore the variant title Nebula Award Stories Ten. The book has also been published in German.

== Summary ==
The book collects pieces published in 1973 and 1974 that won or were nominated for the Nebula Awards for novella, novelette and short story for the year 1975 and nonfiction pieces related to the awards, together with an introduction by the editor. The essays by Dickson and Scholes appeared in the American editions only. The non-winning pieces nominated for Best Novella were omitted from all editions.

== Contents ==
- "Introduction" (James Gunn)
- "The Engine at Heartspring's Center" [Best Short Story nominee, 1975] (Roger Zelazny)
- "If the Stars Are Gods" [Best Novelette winner, 1975] (Gordon Eklund and Gregory Benford)
- "Twilla" [Best Novelette nominee, 1975] (Tom Reamy)
- "Ten Years of Nebula Awards" (Gordon R. Dickson)
- "As the Wall Crumbles" (Robert Scholes)
- "After King Kong Fell" [Best Short Story nominee, 1975] (Philip José Farmer)
- "The Day Before the Revolution" [Best Short Story winner, 1975] (Ursula K. Le Guin)
- "The Rest is Silence" [Best Novelette nominee, 1975] (C. L. Grant)
- "Born with the Dead" [Best Novelette winner, 1975] (Robert Silverberg)
- "The Nebula Winners, 1965-1974"
- "The Hugo Winners"

== Reception ==
Publishers Weekly noted the anthology's appearance with an almost entirely descriptive review, observing that "[i]n 1974 the members of the Science Fiction Writers of America chose for the 10th year the stories they felt deserved the coveted Nebula Award; and the winners (except for the novel) are in this collection." It briefly surveys the Silverberg, Eklund/Benford and Le Guin pieces while listing the remainder (and erroneously categorizing the Dickson piece as a story). A review in Locus strongly recommended the collection, highlighting Silverberg's "Born with the Dead" as "outstanding".

The anthology was also reviewed by Martin Last in The Science Fiction Review Monthly, January 1976 and Richard Delap in Delap's F & SF Review, March 1976.

== Awards ==
The book placed ninth in the 1976 Locus Poll Award for Best Anthology.
