= Effie Seiberg =

American author

- Occupations: Author, essayist, activist
- Writing career
- Language: English
- Period: 2013–present
- Genre: Speculative fiction
- Notable awards: Nebula Award (2025)
- Website: www.effieseiberg.com

Effie Seiberg is an American essayist, activist, and author of speculative fiction.

== Biography ==
Seiberg originally studied chemistry in college because she "loved the logic of it," but switched to studying logic itself. Her undergraduate degree is in philosophy/logic. She later went to work in strategy and marketing for tech companies. As of 2018, she is an independent consultant to various tech startups.

In 2018, she was disabled with the chronic illness ME/CFS, becoming an ambulatory wheelchair user.

She resides in the San Francisco Bay Area, California, with her small dog Bagel for whom she describes herself as serving as an emotional support human. She is an activist on disability issues and anti-fascism. Her interests include telling dad jokes and puns, occasional cake sculpture, and a love of sentence fragments.

== Writing career ==
Seiberg's first professionally published short story was "Strong As Stone" (Cast of Wonders #278, Nov. 26, 2017). Her work has appeared in Analog, Cast of Wonders, Crossed Genres, Daily Science Fiction, Diabolical Plots, The Drabblecast, Escape Pod, Factor Four Magazine, Fantastic Stories of the Imagination, Fantasy Magazine, Fantasy Podcast, Galaxy's Edge, Far-Fetched Fables, Fierce Family, Fireside Magazine, FumpTRuck, Gavagai, Journeys Beyond the Fantastical Horizon: The Best of Galaxy's Edge, Lightspeed, Nebula Awards Showcase 61, PodCastle, NonBinary Review, Pseudopod, Putting the Science in Fiction, Stupefying Stories, Toasted Cake, and Unconventional Fantasy: A Celebration of Forty Years of the World Fantasy Convention.

Seiberg's nonfiction and satirical pieces have been published in the San Francisco Chronicle and her own website. They also have been read at No Kings rallies.

Some of her work has been translated into Korean and Mandarin.

== Awards ==
Seiberg's short story "Rocket Surgery" was a finalist in Analog's 2016 AnLab Awards.

Some of her stories also received an honorable mention in the Year's Best YA Speculative Fiction 2015, were included in the Tangent 2016 recommended reading list, and received a nomination for the Subjective Chaos Kind Of Award.

Her short story "Laser Eyes Ain't Everything" won the 2025 Nebula Award for Best Short Story. It was a finalist for the 2026 Hugo Award for Best Short Story and the 2026 Theodore Sturgeon Award.

== Bibliography ==
=== Short fiction ===
- "Strong As Stone" (2013)
- "Dinkley's Ice Cream" (2014)
- "Ro-Sham-Bot" (2014)
- "Under the Bed" (2014)
- "RedChip BlueChip" (2015)
- "Recipe: 1 Universe" (2015)
- "Rocket Surgery" (2016)
- "Thundergod in Therapy" (2016)
- "Re: Little Miss Apocalypse Playset" (2016)
- "The Apothecary's Handbook" (2016)
- "Carbon Dating" (with Spencer Ellsworth) (2017)
- "The Thirty-Seven Faces of Tokh-Bathon" (2017)
- "Submission Guidelines for the Fairyland Gazette" (2018)
- "Just One More Kitten GIF" (2018)
- "Optimizing the Verified Good" (2018)
- "In Regards to Your Concerns About Your ScareBnB Experience" (2019)
- "The Tale of Descruptikn and the Product Launch Requirements Documentation" (2019)
- "The Day I Didn't Get a Pet Nebula" (2021)
- "A Guided Meditation for Pandemic Anxiety (As Approved by Our Lord Xanthalu)" (2021)
- "Worrywort" (2022)
- "The Travel Guide to the Dimension of Lost Things" (2022)
- "There's Magic in Bread" (2023)
- "Post-Op Instructions After Your Mind Control Chip Implantation" (2024)
- "Laser Eyes Ain't Everything" (2025)
- "In the Void Behind My Deaths" (2025)
- "Bots All the Way Down" (2026)
- "The Metamorphosis" (2026)

=== Essays ===
- "Your Science Fiction Cell Phone Isn't Cool Enough" (2018)
- "How to Steal a Million (Dollars) Dragons" (2021)
- "So you've got long COVID? Here are 5 things you should know" (2021)
- "Think 'mild' omicron is no big deal? Here's what long COVID symptoms feel like" (2022)
- "Just because some people can pretend COVID is over, doesn't mean it actually is" (2022)
- "Biden says the COVID pandemic is over. He could have fooled me" (2022)
- "RFK Jr. has betrayed millions of Americans like me who suffer from chronic illness" (2025)

=== Satirical writings ===
- "When Trump Definitely Totally Won the Space Alien Invasion" (2025)
- "An Automated Phone Tree for Your Brande New Alligator-Themed Detention Center (That is Definitely Not A Concentration Camp" (2025)
- "A is for Autocracy" (2025)
- "The DOJ Would Like You To KNow That We've Updated the Bill of Rights, You're Welcome" (2025)
- "Mission Report From the Tiny Alien Piloting RFK Jr's Body" (2025)
- "The Tech Billionaire's Wishlist For The Office Secret Santa" (2025)
- "A Much-Needed Update to Sun Tzu's 'The Art of War' as resented in Trump's Daily Intelligence Briefing" (2026)
