= Nebula Winners Fifteen =

1981 anthology edited by Frank Herbert

- First edition (US)
- Author: edited by Frank Herbert
- Cover artist: Egon Lauterberg
- Language: English
- Series: The Nebula Awards
- Genre: Science fiction
- Publisher: Harper & Row 1981 (US); W. H. Allen 1982 (UK)
- Publication place: United States
- Media type: Print (hardcover)
- Pages: xiv, 223
- ISBN: 0-06-014830-6
- Preceded by: Nebula Winners Fourteen
- Followed by: Nebula Award Stories Sixteen

Nebula Winners Fifteen is an anthology of award-winning science fiction short works edited by Frank Herbert. It was first published in hardcover by Harper & Row in April 1981. The first British edition was published in hardcover by W. H. Allen in April 1982. Paperback editions followed from Star in the U.K. in January 1983 and Bantam Books in the U.S. in March 1983.

== Summary ==
The book collects pieces that won or were nominated for the Nebula Awards for novella, novelette and short story for the year 1980 and a few other pieces related to the awards, together with an introduction by the editor and appendices. Not all nominees for the various awards are included.

== Contents ==
- "Introduction" (Frank Herbert)
- "Camps" [Best Novelette nominee, 1980] (Jack Dann)
- "Sandkings" [Best Novelette winner, 1980] (George R. R. Martin)
- "The Straining Your Eyes Through the Viewscreen Blues" [essay] (Vonda N. McIntyre)
- "Enemy Mine" [Best Novella winner, 1980] (Barry B. Longyear)
- "giANTS" [Best Short Story winner, 1980] (Edward Bryant)
- "We Have Met the Mainstream..." [essay] (Ben Bova)
- "The Extraordinary Voyages of Amélie Bertrand" [Best Short Story nominee, 1980] (Joanna Russ)
- "Unaccompanied Sonata" [Best Short Story nominee, 1980] (Orson Scott Card)
- "Appendix A: Nebula Awards 1979"
- "Appendix B: Fifteen Years of Nebula Winners"

== Reception ==
Tom Staicar in Amazing, after briefly detailing the contents, summed up the anthology as a "must-buy collection each year."

The anthology was also reviewed by Theodore Sturgeon in Rod Serling's The Twilight Zone Magazine, August 1981, Ian Watson in Foundation #23, October 1981, and Martyn Taylor in Paperback Inferno v. 7, no. 3, 1983.

== Awards ==
The anthology placed twenty-sixth in the 1982 Locus Poll Award for Best Anthology.
