= Nebula Awards Showcase 61 =

2025 anthology edited by Stephen Kotowych

- Cover of first edition
- Editor: Stephen Kotowych
- Cover artist: Brian Hendrickson
- Language: English
- Series: Nebula Awards Showcase
- Genre: Science fiction and fantasy
- Publisher: SFWA, Inc.
- Publication date: 2026
- Publication place: United States
- Media type: Print (paperback), ebook
- Pages: 261
- ISBN: 978-1-958243-12-1
- Preceded by: Nebula Awards Showcase 60

Nebula Awards Showcase 61: The Year's Best Science Fiction and Fantasy is an anthology of science fiction and fantasy short works edited by Stephen Kotowych. It was first published in paperback and ebook by Science Fiction and Fantasy Writers of America, Inc. on June 9, 2026.

== Summary ==
The book collects pieces that won or were nominated for the Nebula Awards for novelette, short story, and poetry for the year 2025 (presented in 2026), as well as other material.

== Contents ==
- "2025 Nebula Awards"
- "Introduction" (Stephen Kotowych)
- Short Stories
  - "Laser Eyes Ain't Everything" [best short story winner] (Effie Seiberg)
  - "Through the Machine" [best short story nominee] (P. A. Cornell)
  - "Six People to Revise You" [best short story nominee] (J. R. Dawson)
  - "In My Country" [best short story nominee] (Thomas Ha)
  - "The Tawlish Island Songbook of the Dead" [best short story nominee] (E. M. Linden)
  - "Because I Held His Name Like a Key" [best short story nominee] (Aimee Ogden)
- Poems
  - "The World to Come" [best poetry winner] (Jennifer Hudak)
  - "Though You Always Are" [best poetry nominee] (Linda D. Addison and Jamal Hodge)
  - "They Said Robots Are" [best poetry nominee] (Casey Almer)
  - "The Mourning Robot" [best poetry nominee] (Angela Liu)
  - "To be the Change" [best poetry nominee] (Nico Martinez Nocito)
  - "Care for Lightning" [best poetry nominee] (Mari Ness)
- Novelettes
  - "Uncertain Sons" [best novelette winner] (Thomas Ha)
  - "Our Echoes Drifting Through the Marsh" [best novelette nominee] (Marie Croke)
  - "We Begin Where Infinity Ends" [best novelette nominee] (Somto Thezue)
  - "The Name Ziya" [best novelette nominee] (Wen-yu Lee)
  - "Never Eaten Vegetable" [best novelette nominee] (H. H. Pak)
  - "The Life and Times of Alavira the Great as Written by Titos Pavlou and Reviewed by Two Lifelong Friends" [best novelette nominee] (Eugenia Triantafyllou)
- "Novella & Novel Finalists"
- "MultiMedia Award Finalists"
