= Nebula Winners Thirteen =

1980 anthology edited by Samuel R. Delany

- First edition
- Editor: Samuel R. Delany
- Cover artist: Robin Malkin
- Language: English
- Series: Nebula Winners
- Genre: Science fiction
- Publisher: Harper & Row
- Publication date: 1980
- Publication place: United States
- Media type: Print (hardback)
- Pages: xiv, 239
- ISBN: 0-06-013786-X
- OCLC: 79884679
- Preceded by: Nebula Winners Twelve
- Followed by: Nebula Winners Fourteen

Nebula Winners Thirteen is an anthology of science fiction short works edited by Samuel R. Delany. It was first published in hardcover by Harper & Row in February 1980, with a paperback edition following from Bantam Books in August 1981.

== Summary ==
The book collects pieces that won or were nominated for the Nebula Awards for novella, novelette, and short story for the year 1977 (presented in 1978), together with an introduction by the editor and a bibliography of winning pieces from the inception of the award through the award year covered by the anthology. All three of the winning stories for the year were included, but only a selection of the non-winning pieces nominated for the awards. The stories had originally appeared in the magazines The Magazine of Fantasy & Science Fiction, Isaac Asimov's Science Fiction Magazine, Analog, and the anthology 2076: The American Tricentennial, edited by Edward Bryant.

== Contents ==
- "Introduction" (Samuel R. Delany)
- "Jeffty Is Five" [Best short story winner, 1978] (Harlan Ellison)
- "Air Raid" [Best short story nominee, 1978] (Herb Boehm)
- "The Screwfly Solution" [Best novelette winner, 1978] (Raccoona Sheldon)
- "Particle Theory" [Best novelette nominee, 1978] (Edward Bryant)
- "Stardance" [Best novella winner, 1978] (Spider Robinson & Jeanne Robinson)
- "Aztecs" [Best novella nominee, 1978] (Vonda N. McIntyre)
- "The Nebula Winners, 1965–1977"

== Reception ==
Publishers Weekly calls Delany's introduction "illuminating", assessing Ellison's piece as "an affecting fantasy", the Robinsons' as an "examination of the art of dance and communication," Sheldon's as "a chilling answer to the human question," McIntyre's as "unforgettable," Bryant's as striking "a delicate balance between the personal and the cosmic," and Varley's as "a pounding and original time travel story." The book is summed up as "[a]ll in all, a winning anthology."

Carolyn F. Ruffin in The Christian Science Monitor, notes that "[g]ood science fiction spooks, startles, or awes," and that three stories in the anthology accomplish the first, two the second and one the third. With a nod to Delany's contention in the introduction that "the stories reflect a current trend in science fiction away from 'interest in physics and cosmology ... toward biology,'" she feels "[t]he effect ... is to heighten the impact of the writing." While praising all the selections, she singles "Stardance" out as "among the best in science fiction," a story that "puts one in awe."

The book was also reviewed by Theodore Sturgeon in Rod Serling's The Twilight Zone Magazine, December 1981, and Mary Gentle in Paperback Inferno, v. 5, no. 5, April 1982.

== Awards ==
The anthology placed sixteenth in the 1981 Locus Poll Award for Best Anthology.
