= A. D. Sui =

Ukrainian author

- Born: Ukraine
- Occupations: Author, scholar
- Writing career
- Language: English
- Period: 2022–present
- Genre: Speculative fiction
- Notable awards: 2025 Nebula Award for Best Novella
- Website: thesuiway.ca

A. D. Sui is a Ukrainian author of speculative fiction active in the field since 2022. They write as A. D. Sui.

== Biography ==
Sui was born in Ukraine and raised internationally, and resides in London, Ontario. They describe themself as a "failed academic and retired fencer" with two dogs and "myriads of tropical plants."

== Writing career ==
Sui's work has appeared in Apparition Literary Magazine, Augur, Baffling Magazine, Clarkesworld, Dark Matter Magazine, The Dragonfly Gambit, Embroidered Worlds: Fantastic Fiction from Ukraine & the Diaspora, Etherea Magazine, Every Day Fiction, Flash Frog, Frivolous Comma, Fusion Fragment, Gargantua, Haven Speculative, Heartlines Spec, Hexagon, If There's Anyone Left, JMWW, (mac)ro(mic), Myriad, Nebula Awards Showcase 60, PseudoPod, Saros Speculative Fiction, Scrawl Place, Seize the Press, Shortwave Magazine, Soft Star, Solarpunk Magazine, The Sunday Morning Transport, Tree and Stone Magazine, Wyldblood, Year's Best Canadian Fantasy and Science Fiction: Volume Two, and Year's Best Canadian Fantasy and Science Fiction: Volume Three. Some of their work has been translated into Italian.

== Awards ==
Sui's novella The Dragonfly Gambit won the 2024 Nebula Award for Best Novella, was nominated for the 2025 Aurora Award for Best Novelette/Novella, the 2025 Ignyte Award for Outstanding Novella, and the 2025 Hugo Award for Best Novella, and placed eleventh for the 2025 Locus Award for Best Novella.

Their short story "Toronto Isn't Real and Other Metropolitan Anomalies" was a finalist for the 2023 Theodore Sturgeon Memorial Award.

Their short stories "Hunt" and "Four Mistakes" were 2023 Pushcart Prize nominees.

Their short story "The Case of the Worm at the Silent Disco" was a 2024 Pushcart Prize nominee.

Their short story "Mavka" placed seventeenth for the 2026 Locus Award for Best Short Story.

== Bibliography ==
=== The Cosmic Wheel ===
- The Iron Garden Sutra (2026)
- The Starlight Samsara (forthcoming in February 2027)

=== Other novels ===
- Our Infinite and Inevitable Ends (forthcoming in October 2026)
- Crest (forthcoming in Fall 2027)

=== Novellas ===
- The Dragonfly Gambit (2024)

=== Short fiction ===
- "Toronto Isn't Real and Other Metropolitan Anomalies" (2022)
- "BFFs" (2022)
- "My One and Only, Moonbean" (2022)
- "To Tame a Witch" (2022)
- "My Siblings are the Birch" (2022)
- "Banquet of the Shooting Stars" (2022)
- "Lessons" (2022)
- "The War Moves Forward by a Meter" (2022)
- "Let The Pendulum Swing" (2022)
- "Apple Pie": (2023)
- "Good Samaritan" (2023)
- "Green" (2023)
- "Four Mistakes" (2023)
- "Redline" (2023)
- "A Penny For Your Troubles" (2023)
- "A Spoonful of Sugar Helps the Apocalypse Go Down" (2023)
- "Hunt" (2023)
- "The Succubus and the Store Clerk" (2023)
- "A Robot, a Physicist, and a Monk Walk Into a Bar" (2023)
- "Svitla" (2023)
- "For the Pollinators" (2024)
- "Matter of Taste" (2024)
- "A Girl's Heart is a Wretched Thing" (2024)
- "The Case of the Worm at the Silent Disco" (2024)
- "Kill Switch" (2024)
- "As Luck Would Have It" (2024)
- "One Becomes Two" (2024)
- "Rent-a-Joe" (2025)
- "Mavka" (2025)
- "Two Bikes, One Red, One Silver" (2025)
- "A White Day Comes" (2025)
- "To Walk This Distant Shore with You" (2026)
- "A Man Who Was The Ocean" (2026)
