= The Nebula Awards 19 =

1984 science fiction anthology

The Nebula Awards #19
- Cover of first edition
- Editor: Marta Randall
- Cover artist: Maxine Davidowitz
- Language: English
- Series: Nebula Awards
- Genre: Science fiction
- Publisher: Arbor House
- Publication date: 1984
- Publication place: United States
- Media type: Print (hardcover)
- Pages: 255
- ISBN: 0-87795-662-6
- OCLC: 11476410
- Preceded by: The Nebula Awards #18
- Followed by: Nebula Awards 20

The Nebula Awards #19 is an anthology of award winning science fiction short works edited by Marta Randall. It was first published in hardcover by Arbor House in December 1984.

== Summary ==
The book collects pieces that won or were nominated for the Nebula Awards for novella, novelette and short story for the year 1984 and a couple nonfiction pieces related to the awards, together with an introduction by the editor. Not all nominees for the various awards are included.

== Contents ==
- "Introduction" (Marta Randall)
- "Hardfought" [Best Novella winner, 1984] (Greg Bear)
- "The Peacemaker" [Best Short Story winner, 1984] (Gardner Dozois)
- "Slow Birds" [Best Novelette nominee, 1984] (Ian Watson)
- "Blood Music" [Best Novelette winner, 1984] (Greg Bear)
- "Homefaring" [Best Novella nominee, 1894] (Robert Silverberg)
- "The 1983 Nebula Awards Nominees"
- "Past Nebula Winners"

== Reception ==
Tom Easton in Analog Science Fiction/Science Fact praises the anthology's contents, writing "[a]ll are excellent tales," highlighting the winning pieces by Bear and Dozois "for choice passages," as well as the nominated ones by Watson and Silverberg. He notes that "Marta Randall's brief introduction puts the whole Nebula process in perspective."

The anthology was also reviewed by Debbie Notkin in Locus no. 289, February 1985 and William Marden in Fantasy Review, April 1985.

== Awards ==
The book placed twenty-second in the 1995 Locus Poll Award for Best Anthology.
