= Proof by Induction =

Science fiction short story

"Proof by Induction" is a 2021 science fiction short story by José Pablo Iriarte. It was first published in Uncanny Magazine.

== Synopsis ==
Paulie is a mathematician who uses a recording of his dead father's mind in an attempt to solve a particularly difficult problem.

== Reception ==
"Proof by Induction" was a finalist for the 2022 Hugo Award for Best Short Story, and for the Nebula Award for Best Short Story of 2021.
