= Marta Randall =

American writer of science fiction

Marta Randall (born 1948 in Mexico City) is an American science fiction writer.

In addition to writing numerous science fiction novels and short fiction, Marta Randall has edited the New Dimensions science fiction anthology series, and The Nebula Awards #19.

She has taught science fiction writing at the Clarion East and Clarion West writing workshops, UC Berkeley extension, Portland State University, and at private workshops. From 1981 through 1984, she served first as Vice-President and later the first female President of the Science Fiction Writers of America.

Randall has published under the pseudonym Martha Conley as well as her real name.

== Bibliography ==
=== Kennerin Saga ===
- Journey (Pocket Books, 1978) (ISBN 0-7592-2560-5)
- Dangerous Games (Mercury Press, 1980) (ISBN 0-7592-4939-3)

=== Riders Guild ===
- The Sword of Winter (1983, Timescape). Later revised as Mapping Winter (2019, Endeavor Venture)
- The River South (2019, Endeavor Venture)

=== Other novels ===
- A City in the North (1976, Warner Books) (ISBN 0-446-94062-3). Later revised as A City in the North: Reconsidered (2019)
- Islands (1976, Pyramid) (Nebula Award nominee) (ISBN 0-7592-4000-0)
- Those Who Favor Fire (1984, Pocket Books) (ISBN 0-671-44216-3)
- Growing Light (as Martha Conley) (1993, St. Martins Press) (ISBN 0-312-09823-5)

=== Collections ===
- Collected Stories (2007)

=== Short stories ===
- "Smack Run" (1972); New Worlds 5
- "A Scarab in the City of Time" (1975); New Dimensions 5
- "Megan's World" (1976); The Crystal Ship
- "Secret Rider" (1976); New Dimensions 6
- "The State of the Art on Alyssum" (1977); New Dimensions 7
- "The View from Endless Scarp" (1979); The Magazine of Fantasy & Science Fiction
- "The Captain and the Kid" (1979); Universe 9
- "Circus" (1980); New Dimensions 10
- "Sugarfang" (1980); Shayol #4
- "Emris: An Excerpt" (1981); A Fantasy Reader: The Seventh World Fantasy Convention Book
- "Singles" (1982); Shadows 5
- "Meya" (excerpt) (1984); Norwescon 7 Program Book
- "On Cannon Beach" (1984); Asimov's Science Fiction
- "Thank You, Mr. Halifax" (1984); Omni Magazine
- "Big Dome" (1985); The Planets
- "Sea Changes" (1985); Asimov's Science Fiction
- "Lapidary Nights" (1987); Universe 17
- "Undeniably Cute: A Cautionary Tale" (1985); Asimov's Science Fiction
- "Haunted" (1987); The Twilight Zone Magazine
- "A Question of Magic" (1990); Tales of the Witch World 3
- "Managing Helen" (2003); The Readerville Journal
- "The Dark Boy" (2007); The Magazine of Fantasy & Science Fiction
- "Làzaro y Antonio" (2007); The Magazine of Fantasy & Science Fiction

=== Anthologies edited ===
- New Dimensions 11 (1980) (with Robert Silverberg)
- New Dimensions 12 (1981) (with Robert Silverberg)
- The Nebula Awards #19 (1984)
