= How the Trick Is Done =

- Short story by A.C. Wise
- Country: United States
- Language: English
- Genres: Magic realism, speculative fiction

Publication
- Published in: Uncanny Magazine
- Publication type: Magazine
- Publisher: Uncanny Magazine
- Publication date: 2019

"How the Trick Is Done" is a magic realism short story by A.C. Wise. It was first published in Uncanny Magazine in 2019.

== Synopsis ==
A version of the bullet catch trick — one predicated on the magician's girlfriend secretly having the power to raise the dead — goes terribly wrong.

== Reception ==
"How the Trick Is Done" was a finalist for the Nebula Award for Best Short Story of 2019.
