= We Will Teach You How to Read =

"We Will Teach You How to Read" (stylized as "We Will Teach You How to Read | We Will Teach You How to Read") is a science fiction short story by Caroline M. Yoachim. It was first published in Lightspeed, in May 2024.

== Synopsis ==
Rather than being a standard narrative, "We Will Teach You How to Read | We Will Teach You How to Read" is presented as a message from an alien intelligence whose thought processes involve a significantly greater degree of parallel processing than those of humans, and whose lifespan is orders of magnitude less than that of humans; thus, as an essential part of communication, the alien intelligence must teach humans to read in a new way.

== Reception ==
"We Will Teach You How to Read | We Will Teach You How to Read" was a finalist for the 2024 Nebula Award for Best Short Story, the 2025 Hugo Award for Best Short Story, the 2025 Eugie Award, and the 2025 Theodore Sturgeon Award.

The short story won the 2025 Ignyte Award for Best Short Story.

Locus described the story as "structurally complex" and "an experimental piece that’s well worth spending some time with".
