= Ten Excerpts from an Annotated Bibliography on the Cannibal Women of Ratnabar Island =

"Ten Excerpts from an Annotated Bibliography on the Cannibal Women of Ratnabar Island" is a horror fiction short story by Nibedita Sen. It was first published in Nightmare Magazine, in May 2019.

Sen has described the story as being about "colonialism in academia, monstrous appetites, and oh yes, lesbian cannibals."

== Synopsis ==
Rather than being presented as a standard narrative, the story is in the form of excerpts from the bibliography of a document detailing the consequences of a British expedition landing on the fictitious Ratnabar Island, in the Andamans.

== Reception ==
"Ten Excerpts" was a finalist for the Nebula Award for Best Short Story in 2019, and the 2020 Hugo Award for Best Short Story.

Tangent Online "appreciated the idea" of the story, emphasizing that it has "important things to say", and noted that the form enabled Sen to incorporate a quantity of narrative that "would probably have otherwise required a full-length novel", but overall found it "scattered and (...) difficult to engage with", with the story's "power [being] somewhat lost" because of the multiple narrative voices.
