= José Pablo Iriarte =

American author

- Children: 2
- Writing career
- Pen name: José Iriarte
- Language: English
- Years active: 2013–present
- Genres: fantasy, short stories, science fiction, middle grade fiction
- Notable works: The Substance of My Lives, the Accidents of Our Births
- Website: www.labyrinthrat.com

José Pablo Iriarte is a Cuban American author of children's fiction, science fiction, and fantasy, best known for the Nebula Award and James Tiptree Award nominated novelette "The Substance of My Lives, the Accidents of Our Births".

== Personal life ==
Iriarte is Cuban American and Spanish is their first language, having learned English right after starting kindergarten. The first paying magazine rejection Iriarte received was at 13.

Iriarte is non-binary and indicates having a long fascination with gender and societal expectations of it. Iriarte's work takes inspiration from the young adult novelist A. S. King and the short story writers Sam J. Miller, Sarah Pinsker, Caroline M. Yoachim, Sandra McDonald, Ken Liu, and Elizabeth Bear.

Iriarte works as a high school math teacher and lives in Central Florida with a spouse and two children.

== Selected works ==
The novelette "The Substance of My Lives, the Accidents of Our Births" tackles gender identity, a choice inspired by Iriarte identifying as non-binary. The story was published in the American online speculative magazine Lightspeed, in Issue 92, in January 2018. It was a finalist for a Nebula Award for Best Short Story in the category Fantasy in 2018 and on the longlist for the James Tiptree Award in 2018. It was received favorably by critics, earning a triple star review, and was on Tangent Online's Recommended Reading List in 2018.

Iriarte's short story "Yuca and Dominoe", originally published by Strange Horizons in 2013, has also been translated into Spanish and published in the anthology Órbita Juracán: Cuentos de Ciencia Ficción in 2016 as "Yuca y Dominos."

Iriarte's 2016 short story "The Vampire's Stepdaughter" was published in the September/August issue of Fantastic Stories of the Imagination. It was on Tangent Online's Recommended Reading List in 2016 and received a starred review, as well as the 2017 short story "O Stone, Be Not So" in 2017.

Some of Iriarte's work is published under the name José Iriarte.

== Bibliography ==
- "Cabrón" in TWO: The Second Annual Horror Special (Stupefying Stories Magazine, 2013)
- "Yuca and Dominoe" (Strange Horizons, 2013)
- "Extra Innings" (Penumbra eMag, 2014)
- "Message from Beyond" (Fantastic Stories of the Imagination, 2015)
- "Weight of the World" (Fantastic Stories of the Imagination, 2015)
- "Cupid and Psyche at the Caffé Sol y Mar" (Fireside Fiction, 2015)
- "The Flood" (The Grantville Gazette, 2015)
- "The Curse of Giants" in People of Color Take Over Fantastic Stories Flash Fiction Anthology (2016)
- "The Vampire's Stepdaughter." (Fantastic Stories of the Imagination, 2016)
- "Life in Stone, Glass, and Plastic" (Strange Horizons, 2016)
- "Of Unions, Intersections, and Empty Sets" (Fantastic Stories of the Imagination, 2016)
- "Spirit of Home" (Motherboard, 2016)
- "The Curse of Giants" (Daily Science Fiction, 2016)
- "O Stone, Be Not So" (Diabolical Plots, 2017)
- "Heart Stitch" (Daily Science Fiction, 2017)
- "Duck Duck God" (Book Smugglers Publishing, 2017)
- "A Mile in His Cleats" (Spaceports and Spidersilk, 2018)
- "The Substance of My Lives, the Accidents of Our Births" (Lightspeed Magazine, 2018)
- "Secrets and Things We Don't Say Out Loud" (Cast of Wonders, 2018)
- "This Wine-Dark Feeling That Isn't the Blues" (Escape Pod, 2019)
- "Proof by Induction" (Uncanny Magazine, 2021)
- Benny Ramírez and the Nearly Departed (Knopf, 2024)
- AJ Torres and the Treasure of Captain Grayshark (Random House Children's Books, 2025)

== Awards ==
=== Won ===
- Sippy Award for "Life in Stone, Glass, and Plastic" (Strange Horizons, 2016)

=== Nominated ===
- Nebula Award for Best Novelette for "The Substance of My Lives, the Accidents of Our Births" (Lightspeed Magazine, 2018)
- James Tiptree Jr. Memorial Award for "The Substance of My Lives, the Accidents of Our Births" (Lightspeed Magazine, 2018)
- Hugo Award for Best Short Story for "Proof by Induction" (Uncanny Magazine, May/Jun 2021).
