= Nibedita Sen =

Bengali-born writer of speculative fiction

- Born: Calcutta, West Bengal, India
- Occupation: Author
- Writing career
- Genre: Speculative fiction
- Website: www.nibeditasen.com

Nibedita Sen is a queer Bengali-born writer of speculative fiction. She has been a finalist for the Astounding, Nebula, and Hugo Awards.

== Life ==
Sen was born in Calcutta. She "accumulated a number of English degrees in India" before moving to the United States to study for another in creative writing. She currently works as an editor in New York City. She is also a gamer and artist.

== Writing career ==
Sen is a graduate of Clarion West 2015, and has been active in the speculative fiction field since 2017. In addition to her fiction, she works as an editor, helping edit the LGBTQ SFF podcast Glittership.

Her work has appeared in various periodicals and anthologies, including Anathema, The Book Smugglers, Cast of Wonders, The Dark, Fireside Magazine, Fireside Quarterly, Nightmare Magazine, PodCastle, Robot Dinosaur Fiction!, and Strange Horizons.

Roux is the author of the upcoming licensed novel Critical Role: The Mighty Nein – Children of Empire (November 2026), which will bridge the time between Critical Role's second and third campaigns.

== Bibliography ==
=== Short fiction ===
- "Never Yawn Under a Banyan Tree" (Anathema, Aug. 2017)
- "Leviathan Sings to Me in the Deep" (Nightmare Magazine, Jun. 2018)
- "Pigeons" (Fireside Quarterly, Jul. 2018)
- "Sphexa, Start Dinosaur" (Robert Dinosaur Fiction!, Aug. 3, 2018)
- "Ten Excerpts from an Annotated Bibliography on the Cannibal Women of Ratnabar Island" (Nightmare Magazine, May 2019)
- "We Sang You As Ours" (The Dark #49, Jun. 2019)
- "Advice for Your First Time at the Faerie Market" (Fireside Magazine, Jul. 2019)

=== Nonfiction ===
- "The Long Arm of the West" (The WisCon Chronicles, Vol. 11: Trials by Whiteness, Jun. 2017)
- "I Am Known: Representation in Videogames" (The Book Smugglers, Nov. 2018)
- "Empire of Sand, by Tasha Suri" (review) (Strange Horizons, Feb. 2019)
- "The H Word: It's Alive!" (Nightmare Magazine, Mar. 2019)
- "Author Spotlight: Mari Ness" (Nightmare Magazine, Apr. 2019)
- "The Luminous Dead, by Caitlin Starling" (review) (Strange Horizons, Sep. 2019)
- "The Big Idea: Nibedita Sen" (Whatever, Nov. 16, 2020)

=== Anthologies edited ===
- Nebula Awards Showcase 54 (2020)

=== Interviews ===
- "Author Spotlight: Nibedita Sen" by Sandra M. Odell (Nightmare Magazine, Jun. 2018)
- "Author Spotlight: Nibedita Sen" by A. Merc Rustad (Nightmare Magazine, May 2019)

== Awards ==
Sen was a finalist for the 2020 Astounding Award for Best New Writer. "Ten Excerpts from an Annotated Bibliography on the Cannibal Women of Ratnabar Island" was a finalist for both the 2020 Nebula Award for Best Short Story and the 2020 Hugo Award for Best Short Story.
