= A. C. Wise =

Canadian author

- Born: Montreal, Quebec, Canada
- Occupation: Author
- Writing career
- Language: English
- Period: 2005–present
- Genre: Speculative fiction
- Notable awards: Sunburst Award (2017)
- Website: www.acwise.net

Alison Campbell-Wise is a Canadian author of speculative fiction, active in the field since 2005. She writes as A. C. Wise, except for a few early stories under her full name.

== Biography ==
Alison Wise was born and raised in Montreal. She currently resides in the Philadelphia area.

Wise's work has appeared in various publications, including Uncanny Magazine, Tor.com, Shimmer Magazine, and several Year's Best anthologies. With Bernie Mojzes, she co-edited the e-magazine Unlikely Story from 2011 to 2015 and the anthology Clowns: The Unlikely Coulrophobia Remix (2016).

She writes several review columns: "Women to Read" (originally appearing in SF Signal) and "Non-Binary Authors to Read" for The Book Smugglers blog, and "Words for Thought" for Apex Magazine.

== Awards ==
The Ultra Fabulous Glitter Squadron Saves the World Again was a preliminary nominee for the 2016 Sunburst Award for Adult Fiction.

The Last Sailing of the Henry Charles Morgan in Six Pieces of Scrimshaw (1841) won the 2017 Sunburst Award for Best Short Story; The Men from Narrow Houses was also nominated for the same award for that year.

The Time Traveler's Husband was nominated for the 2019 Sunburst Award for Best Short Story.

Catfish Lullaby was nominated for the 2020 Nebula Award for Best Novella, and How the Trick Is Done was nominated for the 2020 Nebula Award for Best Short Story.

Wolf Moon, Antler Moon won the 2025 Bram Stoker Award for Superior Achievement in Long Fiction and the 2026 Eugie Foster Memorial Award for Short Fiction.

== Bibliography ==
=== Novels ===
- Wendy Darling (2021)
- Hooked (2022) ISBN 978-1-78909-683-5

=== Novellas ===
- Out of the Drowning Deep (2024)
- Wolf Moon, Antler Moon (2025)

=== Collections ===
- The Ultra Fabulous Glitter Squadron Saves the World Again (2015)
- The Kissing Booth Girl and Other Stories (2016)
- The Ghost Sequences (2021)

=== Short fiction ===
- "Skin" (2005)
- "Robin of the Green" (2006)
- "After Midnight" (2006)
- "The Lady and the Tiger" (2006)
- "Under the Bed" (2006)
- "After the Lake" (2006)
- "Giantkiller" (2007)
- "Remembering Ophelia" (2007) (as Alison Campbell-Wise)
- "Dreams, Wholesale" (2007)
- "Feeder" (2007)
- "The Woodwife's Song" (2007)
- "Killing the Witch" (2007)
- "Sleeping in the Kisatchie" (2007)
- "Little Red" (2007) (as Alison Campbell-Wise)
- "At the Altar of Pan" (2007)
- "Matthew" (2008)
- "Strange Fruit" (2008)
- "Blessed" (2008)
- "Teeth" (2008)
- "Cloth from Flesh, Flesh from Bone" (2008)
- "A Mouse Ran Up the Clock" (2009)
- "Sisters of the Blessed Diving Order of Saint Peter and Saint Andrew" (2009)
- "Fortune" (2009)
- "Revisionist History" (2009) (as Alison Campbell-Wise)
- "Mellie's Zoo" (2009)
- "Under the Leaves" (2010)
- "The Children of Main Street" (2010)
- "The Poet's Child" (2010)
- "Final Girl Theory" (2011)
- "The Thief of Precious Things" (2011)
- "Still Life" (2011)
- "The Many Ghosts of Annie Orens" (2011)
- "The Trans-Siberian" (2011)
- "Venice Burning" (2011)
- "Trashman" (2011)
- "My Body, Her Canvas" (2012)
- "The Pornographer's Assistant" (2012)
- "Where Dead Men Go to Dream" (2012)
- "For the Removal of Unwanted Guests" (2013)
- "Kid Wonder" (2013)
- "Tasting of the Sea" (2013)
- "With Tales in Their Teeth, from the Mountain They Came" (2013)
- "The Last Survivor of the Great Sexbot Revolution" (2013)
- "Doctor Blood and the Ultra Fabulous Glitter Squadron" (2013)
- "Lesser Creek: a Love Story, a Ghost Story" (2013)
- "The Book of Her" (2013)
- "How Bunny Came to Be" (2013)
- "The Hush of Feathers, the Clamour of Wings" (2013)
- "Chasing Sunset" (2013)
- "Her Last Breath Before Waking" (2013)
- "At the Everywhere Café" (2013)
- "Matthew, Waiting" (2014)
- "And the Carnival Leaves Town" (2014)
- "Dream of the Fisherman's Wife" (2014)
- "Taking the Ghost" (2014)
- "A Game of Cards" (2014)
- "Evidence of Things Unseen" (2014)
- "From Stone and Bone, from Earth and Sky" (2014)
- "The Lion and the Unicorn" (2015)
- "The Crane Wife" (2015)
- "Letters to a Body on the Cusp of Drowning" (2015)
- "Silver Buttons All Down His Back" (2015)
- "The Double Blind" (2015)
- "The Practical Witch's Guide to Acquiring Real Estate" (2015)
- "And If the Body Were Not the Soul" (2015)
- "We Are Not These Bodies, Strung Between the Stars" (2015)
- "City of the Dead" (2015)
- "From Sapphire's Little Black Book of Cocktails: No" (2015)
- "From Sapphire's Little Black Book of Cocktails: Passion Between the Sheets" (2015)
- "From Sapphire's Little Black Book of Cocktails: Persephone's Kiss" (2015)
- "From Sapphire's Little Black Book of Cocktails: Sapphire's Summer Sangria" (2015)
- "From Sapphire's Little Black Book of Cocktails: The Blushing Rosebud" (2015)
- "From Sapphire's Little Black Book of Cocktails: The Copper Top" (2015)
- "From Sapphire's Little Black Book of Cocktails: The White Velvet Rabbit" (2015)
- "From Sapphire's Little Black Book of Cocktails: Why Bother?" (2015)
- "Jewels Beyond Compare" (2015)
- "Penny in the Air" (2015)
- "Roller Girls Have More Fun" (2015)
- "The Devil Comes to the Midnight Café" (2015)
- "The Story of M" (2015)
- "The Ultra Fabulous Glitter Squadron Saves the World Again; or, The Great G-String Men Team Up Extravaganza" (2015)
- "Even in This Skin" (2015)
- "In the Name of Free Will" (2016)
- "Tekeli-li, They Cry" (2016)
- "Seven Cups of Coffee" (2016)
- "A Guide to Birds by Song (After Death)" (2016)
- "I Dress My Lover in Yellow" (2016)
- "The Men from Narrow Houses" (2016)
- "The Last Sailing of the Henry Charles Morgan in Six Pieces of Scrimshaw (1841)" (2016)
- "When the Stitches Come Undone" (2016)
- "How Objects Behave on the Edge of a Black Hole" (2016)
- "The Ghosts of Mars" (2016)
- "It's the End of the World As We Know It" (2016)
- "Juliet & Juliet(te): A Romance of Alternate Worlds" (2016)
- "The Astronaut, Her Lover, the Queen of Faerie, and Their Child" (2016)
- "The Kissing Booth Girl" (2016)
- "How to Host a Haunted House Murder Mystery Party" (2016)
- "The Paradox Collection" (2017)
- "The Secret of Flight" (2017)
- "Crossing" (2017)
- "Harvest Song, Gathering Song" (2017)
- "Excerpts from a Film (1942–1987)" (2017)
- "Wendy, Darling" (2017)
- "The Stories We Tell About Ghosts" (2017)
- "A Catalogue of Sunlight at the End of the World" (2017)
- "A Moment Before Breaking" (2018)
- "In the End, It Always Turns Out the Same" (2018)
- "With One Tongue" (2018)
- "Words in an Unfinished Poem" (2018)
- "The Time Traveler's Husband" (2018)
- "How the Trick Is Done" (2019)
- "The Ghost Sequences" (2019)
- Catfish Lullaby (2019)
- "The Hunt at Rotherdam" (2022)
