= Ai Jiang =

Canadian author

Ai Jiang (江艾)
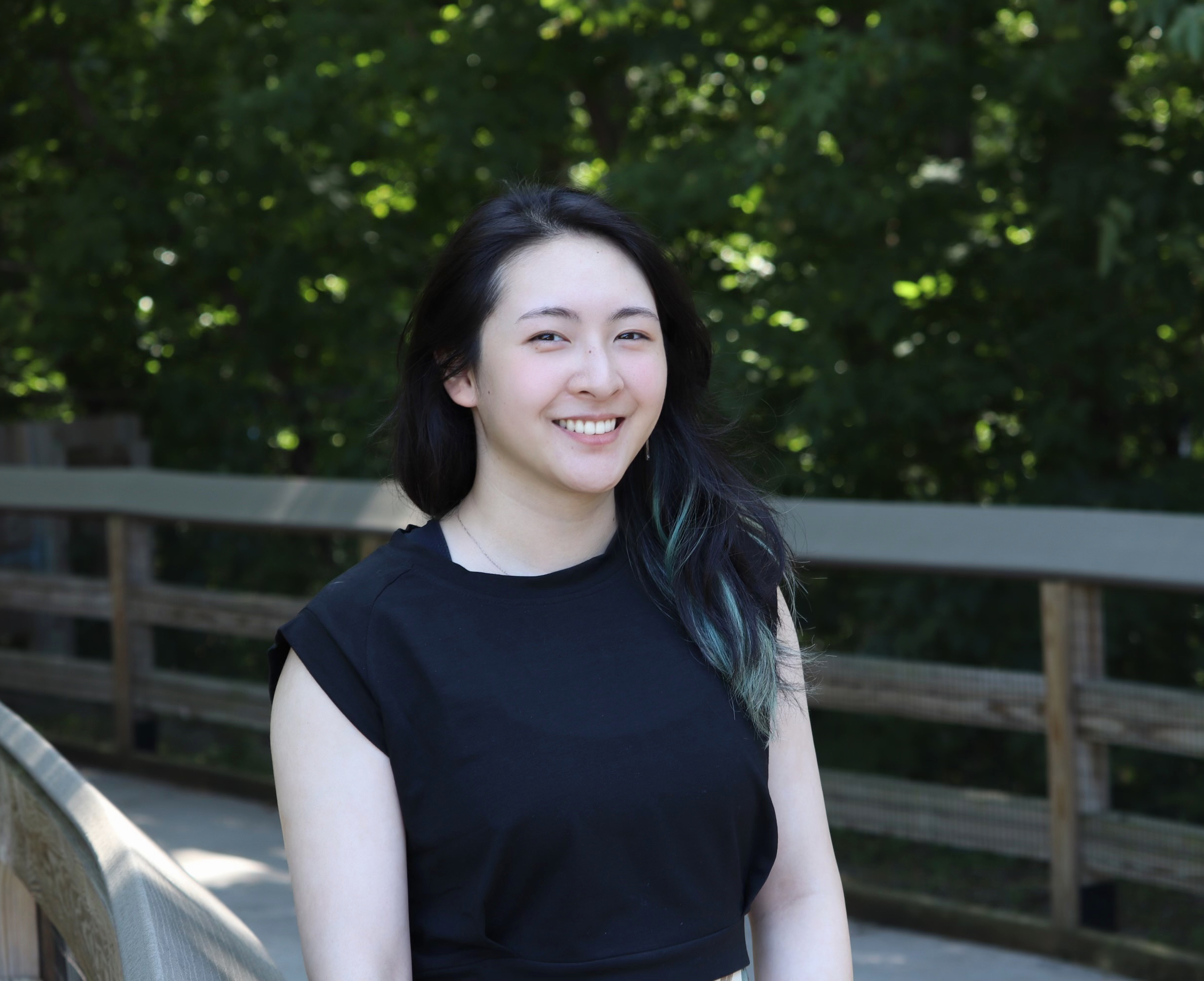
- Jiang in 2023
- Born: June 18, 1997 (age 29); Changle, Fuzhou
- Education: University of Toronto (BA); University of Edinburgh (MSc)
- Occupation: Writer
- Writing career
- Period: 2021–present
- Genre: speculative fiction
- Notable awards: Ignyte Award (2023); Bram Stoker Award (2023); Nebula Award (2023)
- Website: aijiang.ca

Ai Jiang (born June 18, 1997) is a Canadian writer of speculative fiction and poetry. Her work has been nominated for several awards. Her novella, Linghun, won the 2023 Bram Stoker Award and 2023 Nebula Award. Her debut novel, An Empire in the Clouds, was published in September 2026.

== Early life and education ==
Ai Jiang was born in Fujian, China. She emigrated to Canada with her parents when she was four years old, living in Toronto and then Scarborough, Ontario. She can speak Mandarin, though she cannot read or write the language.

Jiang received a Bachelor of Arts in English Literature from University of Toronto, as well as a creative writing certificate from Humber College. She also attended the Gotham Writers' Workshop and the Odyssey Workshop in 2023. She received a Master of Science in Creative Writing from the University of Edinburgh in 2022.

== Writing career ==
Jiang began writing on Wattpad early in high school, influenced by fantastical romances. She later focused on dark fantasy, science fiction, and horror, her current specialties, inspired by movies such as Shutter Island, Us, Parasite, and Get Out, as well as the literary works of Ursula K. Le Guin, Shirley Jackson, Kazuo Ishiguro, and Toni Morrison. In particular, she absorbed their works' focus on atmospheric, character-driven as opposed to fast-paced, plot-driven works. The majority of Jiang's characters are Asian diasporas, though this is more a function of Jiang's background than a conscious authorial decision. Similarly, Jiang's writing features many female characters, exploring political and social issues in her writing. Jiang uses speculative fiction to explore the persistence of current injustices into the future, should they be allowed to continue.

Her work has appeared in a wide variety of speculative venues including Interzone, Uncanny Magazine, The Dark Magazine, Pseudopod, Radon Journal,The Deadlands, Dark Matter, and The Magazine of Fantasy & Science Fiction, in which her Nebula Award nominated story, "Give Me English", appeared in 2022, the same year she was the recipient of the Odyssey Workshop’s 2022 Fresh Voices Scholarship. In addition to short fiction and nonfiction, Jiang also has published poetry. When she writes science fiction, it tends toward the "softer", less technical side.

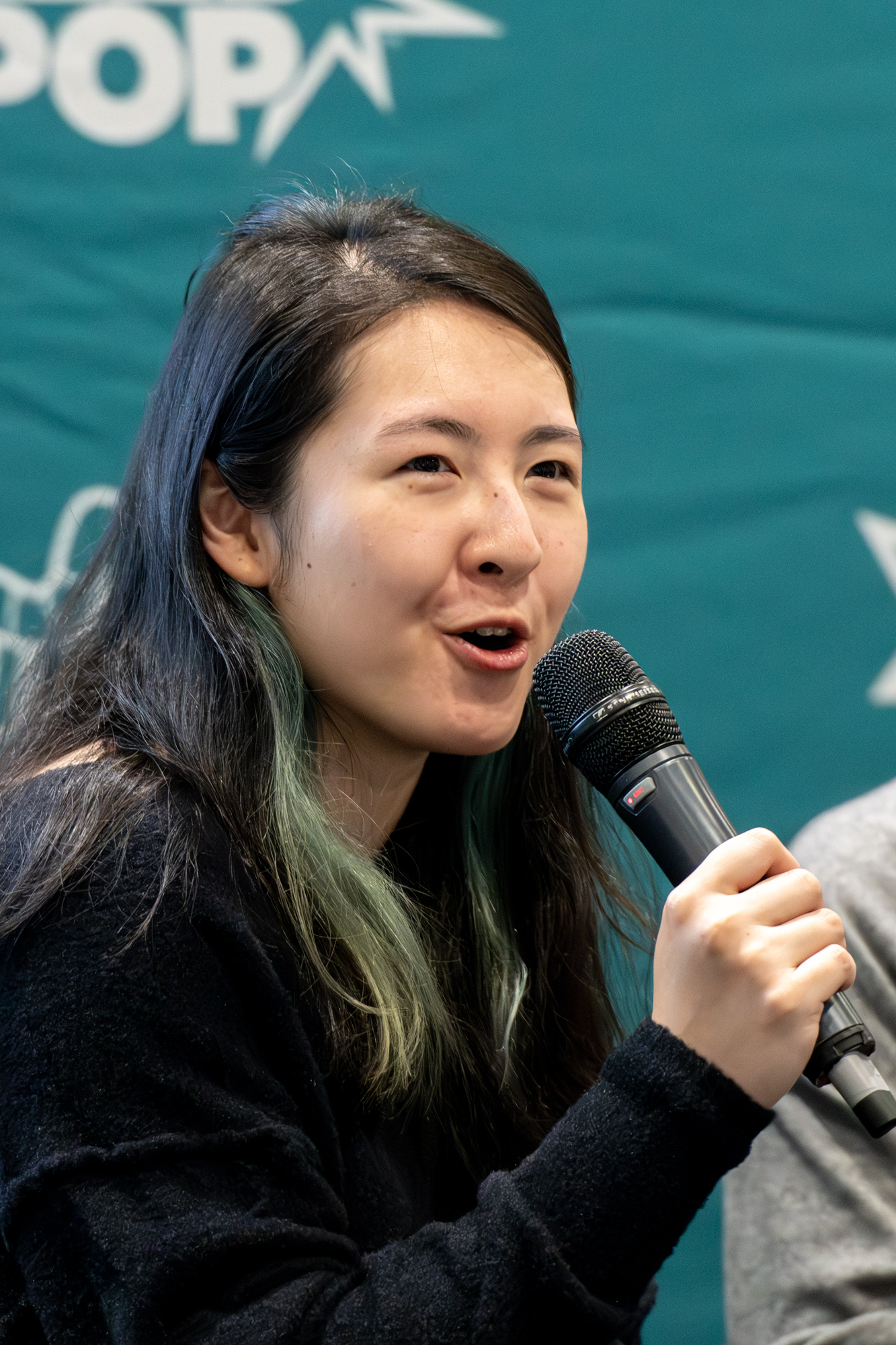
At MCM Comic Con London, May 2025

Jiang's first long-form work, the novella Linghun (Dark Matter INK), was published April 2023. Other projects released in 2023 include a collection of Jiang's short stories, Ai Jiang’s Smol Tales from Between Worlds (Spring 2023), the novelette, "I AM AI" (June 2023), and a novel-length expansion of "Give Me English". A full member of the SFWA and the HWA.

Her poem, "We Smoke Pollution", won the 2023 Ignyte Award.

In 2025, she released a novella, titled A Palace Near the Wind, from Titan Books. It is the first in a science fantasy duology titled The Natural Engines series. In 2026, the sequel novella, A River From the Sky, was released.

In June 2026, it was announced that her novelette "I AM AI" had been optioned for a feature film adaptation.

Jiang's debut novel, An Empire in the Clouds, was released in September 2026. In its review, Publishers Weekly wrote, "there’s no denying the richness and depth of her vision. Readers will find much to savor here."

Jiang second short story collection, Memories Are Only Valuable if They Can Be Lost: Stories, is set to be published in April 2027 by Shortwave Publishing.

== Personal life ==
Jiang is married, and she has made writing her full-time career. Her hobbies include badminton and managing her Instagram foodie account. She is TESOL certified to teach English as a second language.

== Bibliography ==
=== Short fiction ===
- "I AM AI" (Shortwave Publishing, 2023)

=== Collection ===
- Ai Jiang’s Smol Tales from Between Worlds (2023)

=== Novellas ===
- Linghun (Dark Matter INK, 2023)
- The Natural Engines series
  - A Palace Near the Wind (Titan Books, 2025)
  - A River From the Sky (Titan Books, 2026)

=== Novel ===
- An Empire in the Clouds (Titan Books, 2026)

== Awards ==
She was the recipient of Odyssey Workshop’s Fresh Voices Scholarship (2022).

| Year | Title | Award | Category | Result | Ref |
|---|---|---|---|---|---|
| 2022 | "Give Me English" | Nebula Award | Best Short Story | Shortlisted | |
| 2023 | "Give Me English" | Locus Award | Best Short Story | Nominated | |
| 2023 | "We Smoke Pollution" | Ignyte Award | Best in Speculative Poetry | Won | |
| 2023 | Linghun | Bram Stoker Award | Best Long Fiction | Won | |
| 2023 | Linghun | Nebula Award | Best Novella | Won | |
| 2023 | "I AM AI" | BSFA Award | Best Shorter Fiction | Shortlisted | |
| 2023 | "I AM AI" | Nebula Award | Best Novelette | Shortlisted | |
| 2024 | "I AM AI" | Hugo Award | Best Novelette | Shortlisted | |
| 2024 | — | Astounding Award | — | Shortlisted | |
| 2026 | A Palace Near the Wind | Aurora Award | Novellette/Novella | Finalist | |
