= A. T. Greenblatt =

American mechanical engineer and author

Aliza T. Greenblatt
- Occupations: Engineer, author
- Writing career
- Pen name: A. T. Greenblatt
- Genres: Science fiction, fantasy
- Website: atgreenblatt.com

Aliza T. Greenblatt is an American mechanical engineer and author of speculative fiction who writes as A. T. Greenblatt. to avoid confusion with poet Aliza Greenblatt.

== Life ==
Greenblatt attended the School of Engineering at the University of Delaware in Newark, Delaware. where in 2007 she received the Engineering Alumni Association Scholarship, a scholarship "presented to junior engineering students who demonstrate academic excellence, community service, and professional development. She lives in the Philadelphia area and "is a mechanical engineer by day and a writer by night." Greenblatt describes her interests as reading, listening to music, cooking, baking, watching movies, gaming, traveling, and working out.

== Writing career ==
Greenblatt has been active as an author since 2011. She is a graduate of the writing workshops Viable Paradise XVI and Clarion West 2017, and has been an editorial assistant at flash fiction magazines Every Day Fiction and Flash Fiction Online.

Her work has appeared in various periodicals, anthologies and podcasts, including The Absent Willow Review, Asimov's Science Fiction, Aurora Wolf, Beneath Ceaseless Skies, Broad Knowledge: 35 Women Up To No Good, Bduzzy Mag, Clarkesworld Magazine, Daily Science Fiction, Disabled People Destroy Science Fiction, Escape Pod, Flash Fiction Chronicles, Flash Fiction Online, flashquake, Fireside, Girls With Insurance, Lightspeed, Mothership Zeta, Mythic Delirium, One Forty Fiction, One-Sentence Mini Anthology, Pantheon Magazine, PodCastle, Short, Fast, and Deadly, Strange Horizons, Textofiction, Thrillers, Killers, 'n' Chillers, Trapeze Magazine, and Uncanny Magazine.

The story "If We Make It Through This Alive" was featured on the "It's Storytime with Wil Wheaton" podcast where the host narrates works of speculative fiction. The epside was released on April 30, 2025.

== Awards ==
"A Non-Hero's Guide to the Road of Monsters" was a finalist for the 2018 Parsec Award for Best Speculative Fiction Story: Small Cast (Short Form).

"And Yet" was nominated for the 2018 Nebula Award for Best Short Story and placed twentieth in the 2019 Locus Award for Best Short Story. "Give the Family My Love" won the 2019 Nebula Award for Best Short Story and was a finalist for the 2020 Theodore Sturgeon Award. Her novelette "Burn or the Episodic Life of Sam Wells as Super" was a finalist for the 2020 Nebula Award for Best Novelette and the 2021 Hugo Award for Best Novelette.

== Bibliography ==
=== Short stories ===
- "At the Last Moment" (2010)
- "Why Do I Love You?" (2010)
- "For Clara" (2010)
- "Against the Odds" (2010)
- "Prune This!" (2011)
- "A Letter Never Written, Never Sent" (2011)
- "The Goldfish and the Cat" (2011)
- "Crunch, Crash" (2011)
- "True Colors" (2011)
- "The Apple from Fringe Garden" (2012)
- "Letters from Within" (2013)
- "Tell Them of the Sky" (2013)
- "I'm Still Here" (2014)
- "Voices in Solitude" (2015)
- "Beyond the Trenches We Lie" (2015)
- "8 Steps to Winning Your Partner Back (from the Server)" (2015)
- "A Non-Hero's Guide to the Road of Monsters" (2016)
- "They Said the Desert" (2016)
- "Dido, Retold" (2016)
- "A Place to Grow" (2017)
- "Listen and You'll Hear Us Speak" (2017)
- "And Yet" (2018)
- "Graffiti Guardians" (2018)
- "Heavy Lifting" (2018)
- "Five Meters Ahead, Two Centuries Away" (2018)
- "Give the Family My Love" (2019)
- "The Gods of Empty Places" (2019)
- "Team Work" (2019)
- "Before the World Crumbles Away" (2019)
- "Move Forward, Disappear, Transcend" (2019)
- "The Other Side of the Line" (2019)
- "Burn or the Episodic Life of Sam Wells as a Super" (2020)
- "One Time, A Reluctant Traveler" (2020)
- "Questions Asked in the Belly of the World" (2021)
- "The Memory of a Memory Is a Spirit" (forthcoming)
- "RE: Bubble 476" (forthcoming)

=== Nonfiction ===
- "How to Write a Story to Go with Your Morning Coffee" (2011)
- "The Stories We Find Ourselves In" (2018)
- "How to Send Your Disabled Protagonist on an Adventure in 7 Easy Steps" (2019)
