= John Wiswell =

American science fiction and fantasy author (born 1981)

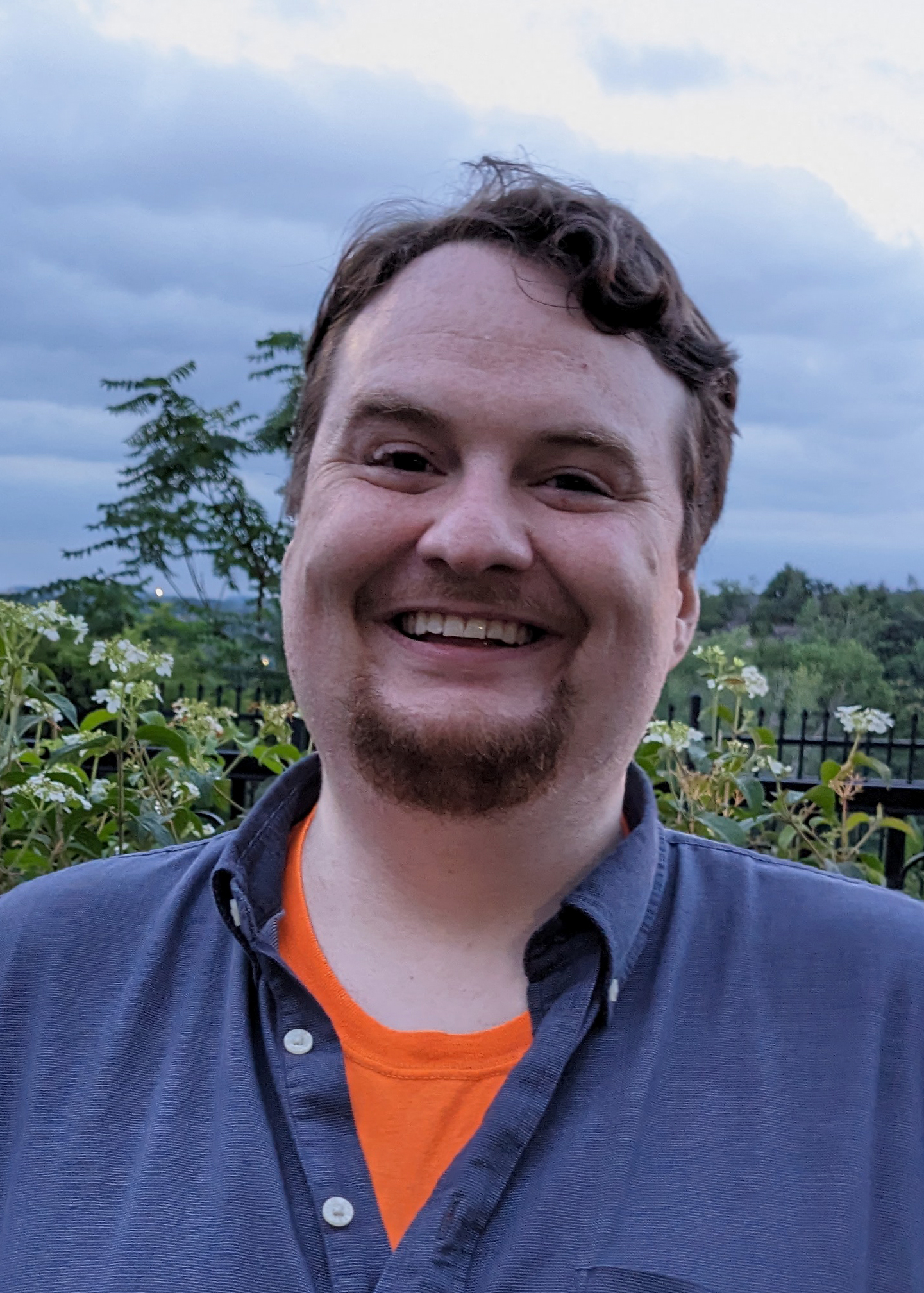
- Born: September 4, 1981 (age 44)
- Occupation: Author
- Writing career
- Language: English
- Genres: Speculative fiction Fantasy; Science fiction
- Notable work: Someone You Can Build a Nest In
- Notable awards: Nebula Award for Best Short Story; Nebula Award for Best Novel

John Wiswell (born September 4, 1981) is an American science fiction and fantasy author. His short fiction and novels have both been the recipient of major speculative fiction awards. His story "Open House on Haunted Hill" won the 2020 Nebula Award for Best Short Story. His debut fantasy novel, Someone You Can Build a Nest In, was released in April 2024. It went on to win the Nebula Award for Best Novel and Locus Award for Best First Novel.

== Early life and education ==
Wiswell was born on September 4, 1981. He grew up in the area of Mount Kisco, New York. He attended Bennington College, graduating in 2005.

== Career ==
Wiswell published his first science fiction story, "Alligators by Twitter", in 2010.

Wiswell's short fiction has been characterized as making outlandish and unsettling concepts feel familiar, often overlapping with metaphors for disability, while also frequently having a "lighthearted and clever" tone. He has written fiction for numerous venues including Nature, Fantasy and Science Fiction, Lightspeed, Tor.com, the NoSleep Podcast, and Uncanny Magazine.

In 2022, DAW Books acquired the rights to publish Wiswell's first two fantasy novels. The debut novel, Someone You Can Build a Nest In, is described as a "creepy, charming monster-slaying sapphic romance — from the perspective of the monster" and was released in spring 2024.

== Personal life ==
Wiswell is asexual and aromantic. In a 2024 interview with Polygon, Wiswell discussed his invisible disabilities and his desire to identify as an openly queer and disabled author. Wiswell lives with a neuromuscular syndrome, among other disabilities. He stated that his personal experiences with queerness, neurodivergence, and disability inspired the character of Shesheshen in Someone You Can Build a Nest In.

More broadly, Wiswell wrote that:

I’ve been publishing short fiction for 15 years, and a lot of it has been about seeing humanity in the inhuman, and using speculative fiction as a way to reflect largely marginalized experiences. Like how you feel dehumanized as an asexual person, a disabled person, or a neurodivergent person.

== Works ==
Novels

- Someone You Can Build a Nest In. DAW Books. 2 Apr 2024. ISBN 9780756418854.
- Wearing the Lion. DAW Books. 17 Jun 2025. ISBN 9780756419547.
- The Dragon Has Some Complaints. DAW Books. 14 Jul 2026. ISBN 9780756420499.

Short Fiction

== Awards ==
| Year | Work | Award | Category | Result | Ref. |
|---|---|---|---|---|---|
| 2020 | "Open House on Haunted Hill" | Nebula Award | Short Story | Won | |
| 2021 | "Open House on Haunted Hill" | Hugo Award | Short Story | Finalist | |
| 2021 | "Open House on Haunted Hill" | Locus Award | Short Story | Finalist | |
| 2021 | "Open House on Haunted Hill" | World Fantasy Award | Short Fiction | Nominated | |
| 2021 | "8-Bit Free Will" | British Fantasy Award | Short Fiction | Shortlisted | |
| 2021 | "For Lack of a Bed" | Nebula Award | Short Story | Nominated | |
| 2021 | "That Story Isn't the Story" | Nebula Award | Novelette | Nominated | |
| 2022 | "For Lack of a Bed" | Locus Award | Short Story | Finalist | |
| 2022 | "That Story Isn't the Story" | Hugo Award | Novelette | Finalist | |
| 2022 | "That Story Isn't the Story" | Locus Award | Novelette | Won | |
| 2022 | "D.I.Y." | Nebula Award | Short Story | Nominated | |
| 2023 | "D.I.Y." | Hugo Award | Short Story | Finalist | |
| 2023 | "D.I.Y." | Locus Award | Short Story | Finalist | |
| 2023 | "The Coward Who Stole God's Name" | Locus Award | Short Story | Finalist | |
| 2023 | "Bad Doors" | Nebula Award | Short Story | Nominated | |
| 2024 | Someone You Can Build a Nest In | Nebula Award | Novel | Won | |
| 2025 | Someone You Can Build a Nest In | Compton Crook Award | — | Finalist | |
| 2025 | Someone You Can Build a Nest In | Hugo Award | Novel | Finalist | |
| 2025 | Someone You Can Build a Nest In | Locus Award | First Novel | Won | |
| 2025 | Wearing the Lion | Nebula Award | Novel | Finalist | |
| 2026 | "Phantom View" | Locus Award | Novelette | Finalist | |
