= Caroline M. Yoachim =

American author

- Yoachim at World Fantasy Convention 2026
- Born: Hawaii
- Occupation: Author
- Writing career
- Genres: Science fiction, fantasy
- Website: carolineyoachim.com

Caroline Mariko Yoachim is an author of speculative fiction who publishes as Caroline M. Yoachim and Caroline Yoachim.

== Early life and education ==
Yoachim was born in Hawaii and raised in the Pacific Northwest. While in college, she minored in anthropology. She received a master's degree in child psychology from the University of Washington.

== Writing career ==
Yoachim started writing speculative fiction in 2005 and attended the 2006 Clarion West Writers' Workshop. She has been active as an author since 2007 when her first published short story, "Time to Say Goodnight", appeared in the December issue of Fantasy Magazine. She has collaborated on a few pieces with Tina Connolly.

Yoachim's work has appeared in various periodicals and anthologies, including Analog Science Fiction and Fact, Andromeda Spaceways Inflight Magazine, Apex Magazine, Artemis Rising, Asimov's Science Fiction, Beneath Ceaseless Skies, Clarkesworld, Daily Science Fiction, Drabblecast, Electric Velocipede, Escape Pod, Fantastic Stories of the Imagination, Fantasy Magazine, Fireside, Flash Fiction Online, Gigantosaurus, Greatest Uncommon Denominator, Humanity 2.0, Infinity Wars, Interzone, Kazka, Lightspeed, The Magazine of Fantasy & Science Fiction, Mechanical Animals, Nature, Nebula Awards Showcase 2018, Oceans: The Anthology, Sum of Us, PoC Destroy Science Fiction, Selfies From the End of the World, Shimmer, Talebones, Uncanny, Unidentified Funny Objects and Unlikely Story.

== Personal life ==
As an adult, she lived with her husband Peter in Austin, Texas, and later in Seattle. She has two children. When not writing, she "dabbles" in photography, selling her work through various stock photo companies. Other hobbies include graphic design, cooking, skiing, yoga and reading.

== Bibliography ==
=== Short fiction ===
Collections

- Yoachim, Caroline M. (2016). Seven Wonders of a Once and Future World and Other Stories. Fairwood Press. ISBN 9781933846552.

Stories (Note: Short stories unless otherwise noted.)

Title	Year	First published	Reprinted/collected	Notes
Time to say goodnight	2007			
Ninety–five percent safe	2015	Yoachim, Caroline M. (January 2015). "Ninety–five percent safe". Asimov's Science Fiction. 39 (1): 41–49.		
We will wake among the gods, among the stars	2016	Yoachim, Caroline M. & Tina Connolly (January–February 2016). "We will wake among the gods, among the stars". Analog Science Fiction and Fact. 136 (1&2): 52–69.		Novelette

- "Setting My Spider Free" (2009) (as Caroline Yoachim)
- "The Best Last Choice I Ever Made" (2009) (as Caroline Yoachim)
- "Firefly Igloo" (2009)
- "The Land of Empty Shells" (2009)
- "Tending the Mori Birds" (2009)
- "Pageant Girls" (2010)
- "Stone Wall Truth" (2010)
- "Blood Willows" (2010)
- "The Sometimes Child" (2010) (as Caroline Yoachim)
- "What Happens in Vegas" (2010)
- "Shades of Orange" (2011)
- "Deathbed" (2011)
- "Mother Ship" (2012)
- "After the Earthquake" (2012)
- "Flash Bang Remember" (2012) (with Tina Connolly)
- "Blue Sand" (2012)
- "The Philosophy of Ships" (2012)
- "The Safe Road" (2012)
- "The Carnival Was Eaten, All Except the Clown" (2013)
- "Harmonies of Time" (2013)
- "Ten Million Sheets of Paper, All in Black and White" (2013)
- "A Crown of Woven Nails" (2013)
- "Elizabeth's Pirate Army" (2013)
- "Beneath the Willow Branches, Beyond the Reach of Time" (2014)
- "One Last Night at the Carnival, Before the Stars Go Out" (2014)
- "Current and Still" (2014)
- "Paperclips and Memories and Things That Won't Be Missed" (2014)
- "Pieces of My Body" (2014)
- "Five Stages of Grief After the Alien Invasion" (2014)
- "Do Not Count the Withered Ones" (2014)
- "Honeybee" (2014)
- "Carla at the Off-Planet Tax Return Helpline" (2014)
- "Bread Babies" (2015)
- "A Million Oysters for Chiyoko" (2015)
- "Red Planet" (2015)
- "Meat That Grows on Trees" (2015)
- "Temporary Friends" (2015)
- "Coin Flips" (2015) with Tina Connolly
- "Goat Milk Cheese, Three Trillion Miles from Earth" (2015)
- "Sugar Showpiece Universe" (2015)
- "Garbage Trucks of Discontent" (2015)
- "Everyone's a Clown" (2015)
- "Goodbye, First Love" (2015)
- "Four Seasons in the Forest of Your Mind" (2015)
- "Dancing with Fire" (2015)
- "Seasons Set in Skin" (2015)
- "Seven Wonders of a Once and Future World" (2015)
- "An Impromptu Guide to Finding Your Soulmate at a Party on the Last Night of the World" (2015)
- "The Little Mermaid of Innsmouth" (2015)
- "Grass Girl" (2015)
- "Betty and the Squelchy Saurus" (2015)
- "Please Approve the Dissertation Research of Angtor" (2015)
- "Rock, Paper, Scissors, Love, Death" (2015)
- "Birthday Child" (2015)
- "We Will Wake Among the Gods, Among the Stars" (2016) (with Tina Connolly)
- "Welcome to the Medical Clinic at the Interplanetary Relay Station │ Hours Since the Last Patient Death: 0" (2016)
- "You Are Not the Hero of This Story" (2016)
- "An Army of Bees" (2016)
- "The First Snow of Winter" (2016)
- "Chocolate Milkshake Number 314" (2016)
- "Love Out of Season" (2016)
- "The Words on My Skin" (2016)
- "On the Pages of a Sketchbook Universe" (2016)
- "Press Play to Watch It Die" (2016)
- "Exquisite Corpse" (2016)
- "Best Chef Season Three: Tau Ceti e" (2016)
- "The Right Place to Start a Family" (2016)
- "A Letter to My Best Friend on the Most Important Day of Her Life, Undelivered, No Known Forwarding Address" (2016)
- "Shadow Station" (2017)
- "Carnival Nine" (2017)
- "The Ivory Hummingbird" (2017)
- "Building a Bridge Too Vast to Cross" (2017)
- "Until the Day We Go Home" (2017)
- "Faceless Soldiers, Patchwork Ship" (2017)
- "Dreams as Fragile as Glass" (2017)
- "Dancing in the Midnight Ocean" (2017)
- "A Rabbit Egg for Flora" (2017)
- "The Clockwork Penguin Dreamed of Stars" (2018) (as Caroline Yoachim)
- "Colors of the Immortal Palette" (2021)
- "We Will Teach You How to Read | We Will Teach You How to Read", Lightspeed Magazine (2024), winner of the 2025 Ignyte Award for Best Short Story

=== Nonfiction ===
- "Penguins, Robins, and Science Fiction" (2016)
- "Author Notes" (Seven Wonders of a Once and Future World and Other Stories) (2016)
- "Introduction" (On the Eyeball Floor and Other Stories) (2016)

———————

== Awards ==
- "Stone Wall Truth" was nominated for the 2011 Nebula Award for Best Novelette.
- "Seven Wonders of a Once and Future World" placed 31st in the 2016 Locus Poll Award for Best Short Story.
- "Ninety-Five Percent Safe" tied for 4th place in the 2016 Asimov's Readers' Poll for Best Short Story.
- "Welcome to the Medical Clinic at the Interplanetary Relay Station | Hours Since the Last Patient Death: 0" was nominated for the 2017 Nebula Award for Best Short Story and placed 15th in the 2017 Locus Poll Award for Best Short Story.
- "Carnival Nine" was nominated for the 2018 Nebula Award for Best Short Story, the 2018 Hugo Award for Best Short Story, and the 2018 World Fantasy Award for Best Short Fiction, and placed tenth in the 2018 Locus Poll Award for Best Short Story.
- "The Archronology of Love" was nominated for the 2020 Nebula Award for Best Novelette, the 2020 Hugo Award for Best Novelette, and the 2020 Theodore Sturgeon Award.
- "Colors of the Immortal Palette" was nominated for the 2022 Hugo Award for Best Novelette.
- "We Will Teach You How to Read | We Will Teach You How to Read" was nominated for the 2025 Hugo Award for Best Short Story".
- "Unfinished Architectures of the Human-Fae War" was nominated for the 2026 World Fantasy Award—Short Fiction.
