= Anthems Outside Time =

2020 collection of short stories by Kenneth Schneyer

Anthems Outside Time: and Other Strange Voices
- Cover of first edition
- Author: Kenneth Schneyer
- Language: English
- Genre: science fiction, fantasy, horror
- Publisher: Fairwood Press
- Publication date: 2020
- Publication place: United States
- Media type: print (paperback), ebook
- Pages: 372
- ISBN: 978-1-933846-92-7

Anthems Outside Time: and Other Strange Voices is a collection of science fiction, fantasy and horror short stories by American writer Kenneth Schneyer. It was first published by Fairwood Press in paperback and ebook in July 2020.

== Summary ==
The book collects twenty-six short works of fiction by the author, most originally published in various genre magazines, anthologies and podcasts, together with an introduction by Mike Allen. Six of the stories had also previously appeared in Schneyer's first collection, The Law & the Heart: Stories to Bend the Mind & Soul (2014).

== Contents ==
- "Introduction: Anthems to Craft and Compassion" (Mike Allen)
- "Some Pebbles in the Palm" (from Lightspeed, July 2016)
- "Hear the Enemy, My Daughter" (from Strange Horizons, May 6, 2013)
- "Living in the Niche" (from Triptych Tales, December 1, 2014)
- "The Mannequin's Itch" (from The Pedestal no. 67, December 2011)
- "Lineage" (from Clockwork Phoenix 3, July 2010)
- "Keepsakes" (from Analog Science Fiction & Fact, November–December 2017)
- "The Last Bombardment" (from Pseudopod no. 459, October 9, 2015)
- "Confinement" (from SQ Mag, edition 2, May 2012)
- "Serkers and Sleep" (from Beneath Ceaseless Skies no. 96, May 31, 2012)
- "I Have Read the Terms of Use" (from Daily Science Fiction, December 3, 2013)
- "The Age of Three Stars" (from Daily Science Fiction, February 2012)
- "Keeping Tabs" (from Abyss & Apex, 4th quarter, 2011)
- "Selected Program Notes from the Retrospective Exhibition of Theresa Rosenberg Latimer" (from Clockwork Phoenix 4, July 2013)
- "The Plausibility of Dragons" (from Lightspeed, November 2015)
- "Calibration" (from Nature Physics, July 2008)
- "Levels of Observation" (from Mythic Delirium issue 0.3, January/March 2014)
- "Who Embodied What We Are" (initial publication)
- "Tenure Track" (from Cosmos Online, November 23, 2010)
- "The Sisters’ Line" (with Liz Argall) (from Uncanny Magazine, September–October 2015)
- "A Lack of Congenial Solutions" (from Humanity 2.0, October 2016)
- "Life of the Author Plus Seventy" (from Analog Science Fiction & Fact, September 2013)
- "You in the United States!" (from Procyon Science Fiction Anthology for 2016, 2016)
- "The Whole Truth Witness" (from Analog Science Fiction & Fact, October 2010)
- "I Wrung It in a Weary Land" (from PodCastle no. 330, September 27, 2014)
- "Six Drabbles of Separation" (from Trifecta XIII, "Stories from the Apocalypse" on The Drabblecast no. 172 (July 19, 2010)
- "Dispersion" (initial publication)
- "Acknowledgements"
- "About the Author"

== Awards ==
"Selected Program Notes from the Retrospective Exhibition of Theresa Rosenberg Latimer" was nominated for the 2014 Nebula Award for Best Short Story and a finalist for the 2014 Theodore Sturgeon Award.

== Reception ==
In a starred review, Publishers Weekly writes "Schneyer ... dazzles with this striking collection of 27 [sic] wide-ranging speculative stories. ... Each world is distinct and fully realized, and the astonishing variety of genre and tone on offer showcases Schneyer’s versatility. Inventive and resonant, this collection is sure to impress." The reviewer singles out "Keeping Tabs" ("emotional"), "Dispersion" ("intimate ... unsettling"), "The Plausibility of Dragons," "The Last Bombardment" ("chilling"), and "Life of the Author Plus Seventy" ("satirical") for particular comment.

Marlene Harris in Library Journal also gives the book a starred review, noting that it "features the author’s somewhat sideways view of the world," its science fiction of "the kind that dives deeply into the human side of the equation" and its "fantasies, even when they feature a monster or a dragon, depict the humans affected by those fantasy creatures. All are from the darker corners of the imagination, whether pain or grief or just plain evil, all are compellingly readable." Overall, she calls it "a strong collection, with fascinating viewpoints on the ways humans exhibit both humanity and inhumanity no matter the circumstances or the century. ... By turns prescient, heartbreaking, and provocative. Highly recommended for readers who want their speculative fiction to make them think—and think hard."

"One of our quietly accomplished writers. Ken Schneyer's Anthems Outside Time and Other Strange Voices includes such first-rate reprints as the Nebula- and Sturgeon-nominated "Selected Program Notes from the Retrospective Exhibition of Theresa Rosenberg Latimer," and my personal favorite among his works, "Keepsakes." There are two originals, both very strong . . . "Who Embodied What We Are" tells the story of the dead hero Herant, one of the now-oppressed people of Dorolana. Slowly, as his deeds are recounted, we learn the real, and horrifying, story of these people. It's clever and quite effective."

Rich Horton in Locus praises the publisher, Fairwood Press, for "[o]nce again ... doing us an excellent service by collecting short fiction from one of our quietly accomplished writers." After noting that the collection "includes such first-rate reprints as the Nebula-and Sturgeon-nominated 'Selected Program Notes from the Retrospective Exhibition of Theresa Rosenberg Latimer' and my personal favorite among his works, 'Keepsakes'" he focuses on its "two originals, both very strong." A "striking reified metaphor for the process of memory loss" highlights "Dispersions," while the "clever and quite effective" device of exploring the horrifying story of an oppressed people through that of its deceased hero characterizes "Who Embodied What We Are."

Don D'Ammassa on Critical Mass writes "I think this is one of those collections that most people should read in small doses rather than straight through, even though all of the stories are individually good to very good." He notes that they "vary quite a lot in structure and tone as well as plot," and "[s]ome are written in a non-traditional format, which might put off some readers who prefer conventional narration." These "do often require you to pay close attention" but "[t]he extra effort is worth it." He cites "Selected Program Notes" and "Keepsakes" as "the two I liked best," and finds "The Plausibility of Dragons" "quite amusing."

Tributes to the book by fellow authors are included in the preliminary matter of the book itself, including recommendations from Kim Stanley Robinson, E. C. Ambrose, James Patrick Kelly, Tina Connolly, C. S. E. Cooney, Adam-Troy Castro, Carlos Hernandez, and F. Brett Cox.
