= Nebula Awards Showcase 2015 =

Anthology of science fiction short works

- Cover of first edition
- Editor: Greg Bear
- Cover artist: John Harris
- Language: English
- Series: Nebula Awards Showcase
- Genre: Science fiction
- Publisher: Pyr
- Publication date: 2015
- Publication place: United States
- Media type: Print (paperback)
- Pages: 349
- ISBN: 978-1-63388-090-0
- OCLC: 907203896
- Preceded by: Nebula Awards Showcase 2014
- Followed by: Nebula Awards Showcase 2016

Nebula Awards Showcase 2015 is an anthology of science fiction short works edited by American writer Greg Bear. It was first published in trade paperback by Pyr in December 2015.

== Summary ==
The book collects pieces that won or were nominated for the Nebula Awards for best novel, novella, novelette and short story for the year 2013 (presented in 2014), as well as the piece that won the Andre Norton Award for that year, a tribute to 2013 grand master winner Samuel R. Delany and a representative early story by him, nonfiction pieces related to the awards, and the three Rhysling Award and Dwarf Stars Award-winning poems for 2013, together with an introduction by the editor. The pieces winning the Best Novel and Andre Norton awards are represented by excerpts; the non-winning pieces nominated for these awards and for Best Novella are omitted.

== Contents ==
- "The Long, Hot Summer of Science Fiction" [introduction] (Greg Bear)
- "If You Were a Dinosaur, My Love" [Best Short Story winner, 2013] (Rachel Swirsky)
- "The Sounds of Old Earth" [Best Short Story nominee, 2013] (Matthew Kressel)
- "Selkie Stories Are for Losers" [Best Short Story nominee, 2013] (Sophia Samatar)
- "Selected Program Notes from the Retrospective Exhibition of Theresa Rosenberg Latimer" [Best Short Story nominee, 2013] (Kenneth Schneyer)
- "Alive, Alive Oh" [Best Short Story nominee, 2013] (Sylvia Spruck Wrigley)
- "The Waiting Stars" [Best Novelette winner, 2013] (Aliette de Bodard)
- "Paranormal Romance" [Best Novelette winner, 2013] (Christopher Barzak)
- "They Shall Salt the Earth with Seeds of Glass" [Best Novelette nominee, 2013] (Alaya Dawn Johnson)
- "Pearl Rehabilitative Colony for Ungrateful Daughters" [Best Novelette nominee, 2013] (Henry Lien)
- "In Joy, Knowing the Abyss Behind" [Best Novelette nominee, 2013] (Sarah Pinsker)
- "The Litigation Master and the Monkey King" [Best Novelette nominee, 2013] (Ken Liu)
- "The Weight of the Sunrise" [Best Novella winner, 2013] (Vylar Kaftan)
- "Excerpt from Ancillary Justice" [Best Novel winner, 2013 (excerpt)] (Ann Leckie)
- "Finding Frankie: Remembering Frank M. Robinson" (Robin Wayne Bailey)
- "Excerpt from Sister Mine" [Andre Norton Award winner, 2013 (excerpt)] (Nalo Hopkinson)
- "A Life Considered as a Prism of Ever-Precious Light: An Appreciation of Samuel R. Delany" (Nalo Hopkinson)
- "Time Considered as a Helix of Semi-Precious Stones" [Best Novelette winner, 1969] (Samuel R. Delany)
- "The Cat Star" [Rhysling Award for Short Poem winner, 2013] (Terry A. Garey)
- "Basho after Cinderella (III)" [Dwarf Stars Award winner, 2013] (Deborah P. Kolodji)
- "Into Flight" [Rhysling Award for Long Poem winner, 2013] (Andrew Robert Sutton)
- "About the Editor"
- "About the Cover Artist"

== Reception ==
Kirkus Reviews, calling attention to the typical delay in the anthology's appearance (in 2015, for awards given in 2014 for works published in 2013), opens its analysis with "At last!" and goes on to proclaim it "Not a banner year, all in all, but good enough to delight and entertain." It singles out the Best Short Story winner as "stunning," while describing the other nominees as "more mundane fare" – "[t]he novelettes, mostly, have more substance." Most of the remaining pieces are described without much particular note, aside from the Delany reprint, praised as a "strong contender for Best Title Ever."

Publishers Weekly describes the book as "an attractive snapshot of the many forms of contemporary fantasy and SF ... simultaneously forward-looking and respectful of the genre’s history," while noting that "[a] surprising number of stories have no overt fantastic content," including the Best Short Story winner, characterized as "heartbreakingly poignant." The Delany reprint is described as "groundbreaking."

Katie Richards in the Portland Book Review writes that the collection "excels at showing the breadth of modern science fiction," differing "from other 'anthology of the year' type volumes not only in the transparent discussion of criteria, but also in the inclusion of the excerpts from longer works. ... The range of types of work in this particular anthology helps give an idea of the whole of science fiction being written today." She rates the pieces included as "of course, wonderful," and their authors as "writers at the top of their genre," while noting that the book "is geared towards sci-fi lovers, and those who are already familiar with ... the genre," and so "likely not a good choice to introduce someone to science fiction." At the same time, it may "disappoint" those "looking for science fiction in the most traditional sense of 'men in space, encountering little green men.'" As the text contains "challenging" points of view and "abounds" with "[a]lternative viewpoints, and alternative sexualities ... [t]his would likely be an appropriate book for an older teen reader, but adults might want to give the book a quick once-over before their children get their hands on it."

The anthology was also reviewed by Gary K. Wolfe in Locus no. 659, December 2015, Don Sakers in Analog Science Fiction and Fact, April 2016, Charles de Lint in The Magazine of Fantasy & Science Fiction, May-June 2016, and Norman Spinrad in Asimov's Science Fiction, October-November 2016.
