= Nebula Awards Showcase 2010 =

2010 anthology edited by Bill Fawcett

- Cover of first edition
- Author: edited by Bill Fawcett
- Cover artist: Elizabeth Phillips
- Language: English
- Series: Nebula Awards Showcase
- Genre: Science fiction short stories
- Publisher: Roc/New American Library
- Publication date: 2010
- Publication place: United States
- Media type: Print (paperback
- Pages: vii, 420 pp.
- ISBN: 978-0-451-46316-6
- Preceded by: Nebula Awards Showcase 2009
- Followed by: The Nebula Awards Showcase 2011

Nebula Awards Showcase 2010 is an anthology of award-winning science fiction short works edited by Bill Fawcett. It was first published in trade paperback by Roc/New American Library in April 2010 .

== Summary ==
The book collects pieces that won the 2009 Nebula Award for novel, novella, novelette, short story and script, the 2009 Andre Norton Award for 2009, a profile of 2009 Grand Master winner Harry Harrison and a representative early story by him, representative early stories by Author Emeritus M. J. Engh and Solstice Award winner Kate Wilhelm, and the three Rhysling and Dwarf Stars Award-winning poems for 2008, together with various other nonfiction pieces and bibliographical material related to the awards and an introduction by the editor. Atypically for the series, none of the nonwinning nominees for the various awards are included.

== Contents ==
- "Introduction" (Bill Fawcett)
- "Early SF in the Pulp Magazines" [essay] (Robert Weinberg)
- "The Space Time Pool" [Best Novella winner, 2009] (Catherine Asaro)
- "The Golden Age" [essay] (David Drake)
- Powers (excerpt) [Best Novel winner, 2009] (Ursula K. Le Guin)
- "Science Fiction in the Fifties" [essay] (Robert Silverberg)
- "Selected Commentaries" [essay] (Algis Budrys)
- "Rules of the Game' [short story] (Kate Wilhelm)
- "A Chance Remark" [essay] (Martin H. Greenberg)
- "Writing SF in the 60s" [essay] (Frederik Pohl and Elizabeth Anne Hull)
- "Pride and Prometheus" [Best Novelette winner, 2009] (John Kessel)
- "Science Fiction in the 1970s: The Tale of the Nerdy Duckling" [essay] (Kevin J. Anderson)
- "Trophy Wives" [Best Short Story winner, 2009] (Nina Kiriki Hoffman)
- "Into the Eighties" [essay] (Lynn Abbey)
- "Talking About Fangs" [short story] (M. J. Engh)
- "Science Fiction in the 1990s: Waiting for Godot...or Maybe Nosferatu" [essay] (Mike Resnick)
- "Place Mat by Moebius" [Dwarf Stars Award winner, 2008] (Greg Beatty)
- "Eating Light" [Rhysling Award for Best Short Poem, 2008] (F. J. Bergmann)
- "The Seven Devils of Central California" [Rhysling Award for Best Long Poem, 2008] (Catherynne M. Valente)
- Flora's Dare (excerpt) [Andre Norton Award winner, 2009] (Ysabeau S. Wilce)
- "Medium with a Message" [essay] (Jody Lynn Nye)
- WALL-E (excerpt from script) [Best Script winner, 2009] (Andrew Stanton and Jim Reardon)
- "The Acceptance Speech of the Bradbury Award Winner" [essay] (Joss Whedon)
- "An Appreciation of the Grand Master Harry Harrison" [essay] (Tom Doherty)
- "The Streets of Ashkelon" [short story] (Harry Harrison)

== Reception ==
Reviewer James Wallace Harris criticizes the anthology for omitting the stories nominated for Nebulas which did not win. "WTF? You’d think an anthology with Nebula Awards in the title would be filled with all the award winners and as many of the nominees as they had room to cram in. Not this one. It has the winners for each category, ... but all the runner-ups get the hook." He finds "[e]verything else in these 420 pages ... padding, and there’s lots of it." He rates the non-fiction part of the book "really disappointing," "slight in actual information, with some essays showing no more work than blog level nattering, that I’d rather trade them all for fiction from the non-winning nominees." Expecting from the titles "a history of science fiction in the 20th century decade-by-decade" that "would be surveys of the best fiction from each of the decades covered," he finds them instead about "the business of SF/F," which "appears ... more interesting to the SFWA writers. ... How can you write an essay about SF in the 1960s and not mention the New Wave? And, not mention work by Samuel R. Delany and Roger Zelazny, ... the decade’s brightest stars? Delany won 4 Nebula awards in the five years they were given in the 1960s." In summation, he writes "[i]f the Nebula Awards Showcase 2010 had just included all the winners and nominees from the non-novel categories I would have been very happy with the collection. It would have been a keeper, instead I’m going to leave it on the free table at work."

The anthology was also reviewed by Larisa Mikhaylova in SFRA Review no. 292, 2010.
