= Kenneth Schneyer =

- Born: February 3, 1960 (age 66); Detroit, Michigan
- Education: University of Michigan
- Occupations: teacher, attorney, author
- Writing career
- Genre: Speculative fiction
- Website: ken-schneyer.livejournal.com

Kenneth Schneyer is an American teacher, attorney and author of speculative fiction.

== Life ==
Schneyer was born in Detroit, Michigan. He graduated from the Cranbrook Schools in 1978 and received his B.A. from Wesleyan University in 1983. He received his J.D. from the University of Michigan Law School in 1986 and has worked as an attorney, judicial clerk, clerk-typist, dishwasher, computer programmer, project manager, actor/director and fiction writer. As an attorney he worked for Judge William R. Beasley of the Michigan Court of Appeals, and for the Boston corporate law firm of Bingham, Dana, & Gould.

He is currently a college professor at Johnson & Wales University in Providence, Rhode Island, where he has been Practicum Director and Assistant Dean of the School of Technology (now the College of Engineering & Design) and served on the Faculty Council and the University Curriculum Committee. He chaired the Cultural Life series for the College of Arts & Sciences.

He is a member of the American Bar Association, the Academy of Legal Studies in Business, the Science Fiction and Fantasy Writers of America, the North Atlantic Regional Business Law Association, and the Cambridge Science Fiction Workshop. He also served as book review editor American Business Law Journal.

Schneyer lives in the East Bay of Rhode Island with his wife Janice Okoomian, an assistant professor of Gender & Women's Studies and English at Rhode Island College. His interests include astronomy, feminist theory, formal logic, presidential history, bicycling, and weight training.

== Writing career ==
Schneyer attended the 2009 Clarion Writers Workshop, where his teachers included Holly Black, Robert Crais, and Kim Stanley Robinson. In the same year he joined the Science Fiction and Fantasy Writers of America. He currently participates in the Cambridge Science Fiction Workshop and Codex Writers.

Schneyer's work has appeared in various periodicals, webzines, podcasts and anthologies, including A is for Apocalypse, Analog Science Fiction and Fact, Abyss & Apex Magazine, Beneath Ceaseless Skies, Bull Spec, Clockwork Phoenix 3, Clockwork Phoenix 4, Daily Science Fiction, Drabblecast, Escape Pod, First Contact, Greatest Uncommon Denominator, Humanity 2.0, Lightspeed, Mad Scientist Journal, Mysterion, Mythic Delirium, Nebula Awards Showcase 2015, Nature Physics, Perihelion, PodCastle, Pseudopod, Rocket Dragons Ignite, SQ Mag, Strange Horizons, Toasted Cake, and Uncanny Magazine.

== Recognition ==
Schneyer won the Sixty Word Sagas competition at EarlyWorks Press. His short story "Selected Program Notes from the Retrospective Exhibition of Theresa Rosenberg Latimer" was nominated for the 2014 Nebula Award for Best Short Story and was a finalist for the 2014 Theodore Sturgeon Memorial Award.

== Bibliography ==
=== Fiction ===
==== Collections ====
- The Law & the Heart: Stories to Bend the Mind & Soul (2014)
- Anthems Outside Time: and Other Strange Voices (2020)

==== Short stories ====
- "Calibration" (2008)
- "Too Much Sense" (2008)
- "Imagination's Curse" (2008)
- "No One's Safe" (2008)
- "Lineage" (2010)
- "And What Remains" (2010)
- "Next Year's Bulbs" (2010)
- "Recaptured Territory" (2010)
- "The Whole Truth Witness" (2010)
- "Tenure Track" (2010)
- "Six Drabbles of Separation" (2010)
- "The Tortoise Parliament" (2011)
- "Less Than Absent" (2011)
- "Keeping Tabs" (2011)
- "The Mannequin's Itch" (2011)
- "The Age of Three Stars" (2012)
- "Confinement" (2012)
- "Serkers and Sleep" (2012)
- "Financial Strategies for Innovative Researchers" (2013)
- "Hear the Enemy, My Daughter" (2013)
- "Selected Program Notes from the Retrospective Exhibition of Theresa Rosenberg Latimer" (2013)
- "Life of the Author Plus Seventy" (2013)
- "I Have Read the Terms of Use" (2013)
- "Levels of Observation" (2014)
- "I" (2014)
- "I Wrung It in a Weary Land" (2014)
- "Living in the Niche" (2014)
- "Trusting What I Smell" (2015)
- "The Sisters' Line" (with Liz Argall) (2015)
- "The Last Bombardment" (2015)
- "The Plausibility of Dragons" (2015)
- "Some Pebbles in the Palm" (2016)
- "A Lack of Congenial Solutions" (2016)
- "You in the United States!" (2016)
- "Keepsakes" (2017)
- "Foursomes" (2019)
- "Who Embodied What We Are" (2020)
- "Dispersion" (2020)
