= Fool's mate (disambiguation) =

The fool's mate is the quickest possible checkmate in the game of chess.

Fool's mate may also refer to:

- Fool's Mate (album), by Peter Hammill
- Fool's Mate (1956 film), a 1956 French film
- Fool's Mate (1989 film), a 1989 German film

== See also ==
- "Idiot's Mate", a 1968 short story
