= Henry James, This One's for You =

"Henry James, This One’s For You"
- Short story by Jack McDevitt
- Country: United States
- Language: English
- Genre(s): Science fiction

Publication
- Published in: Subterranean Magazine
- Publication type: Magazine
- Publisher: Subterranean Press
- Publication date: November 2005

"Henry James, This One’s For You" is a 2005 science fiction short story by American writer Jack McDevitt.

It was a finalist for the 2006 Nebula Award for Best Short Story.

== Plot summary ==
The story is narrated by Jerry, an editor at a smaller publisher. After receiving an amazing manuscript he contacts the author - only to discover an even more amazing secret.
