= Bridesicle =

2009 science fiction short story by Will McIntosh

"Bridesicle" is a 2009 science fiction short story by Will McIntosh, exploring the conjunction of suspended animation and forced marriage. It was originally published in Asimov's Science Fiction.

== Synopsis ==
Eighty years after her death in a car accident, Mira awakens in a 'dating center'. The patrons of the dating center are lonely men seeking wives, and dead women in cryogenic storage. A male patron can revive a female patron's head and interview her — and, if he doesn't like her, press a button to immediately return her to storage. As various suitors reject her, and the years go by, Mira's only chance to avoid being frozen forever is to convince a total stranger that she loves him enough that he should pay for her full revival. However, Mira is a lesbian, and does not want to marry a man.

== Critical reception ==
"Bridesicle" won both the 2010 Hugo Award for Best Short Story and the 2010 Asimov's Reader Poll, along with being a finalist for that year's Nebula Award for Best Short Story.

== History ==
McIntosh had originally tried writing the story from the vantage point of a man who would regularly visit the dating center but be unable to afford a full revival; however, Mary Robinette Kowal suggested that the story would work better from the perspective of a woman trapped within the center.

== Expansion ==
In 2013, Orbit Books published Love Minus Eighty, McIntosh's novel-length expansion of "Bridesicle".
