= Severna Park (writer) =

American writer

- Born: Suzanne Feldman; 1958 (age 67–68)
- Writing career
- Genre: Science fiction
- Notable awards: Nebula Award for Best Short Story

Severna Park (born 1958), real name Suzanne Feldman, is an American science fiction author and winner of the Nebula Award for Best Short Story (The Cure For Everything, 2001).

Her first novel, Speaking Dreams from 1992, was a Lambda Literary Award nominee. She was long-listed for James Tiptree Jr. Award in 1994 (Amazons) and short-listed in 1998 (Hand of Prophecy) and 2000 (The Annunciate).

She now writes mainstream fiction. Employed as a teacher, she lives with her partner of twenty-five years in Maryland.

== Bibliography ==
=== Novels ===
- Speaking Dreams
  - Speaking Dreams (1992)
  - Hand of Prophecy (1998)
- The Annunciate (1999)

=== Collections ===
- The Cure for Everything (2013)

=== Short fiction ===
- Amazons (1993)
- Tiger, Tiger (1998)
- Harbingers (1999)
- The Breadfruit Empire (1999)
- The Golem (2000)
- The Cure for Everything (2000)
- The Peaceable Kingdom (2000)
- Call for Submissions (2003)
- The Island of Varos (2003)
- The Three Unknowns (2004)
- Secret Histories (2013)
- The Crime Museum (2013)

=== Essay ===
- Read This (NYRSF, September 1998) (1998)
