= Dave Smeds =

American science fiction writer (born 1955)

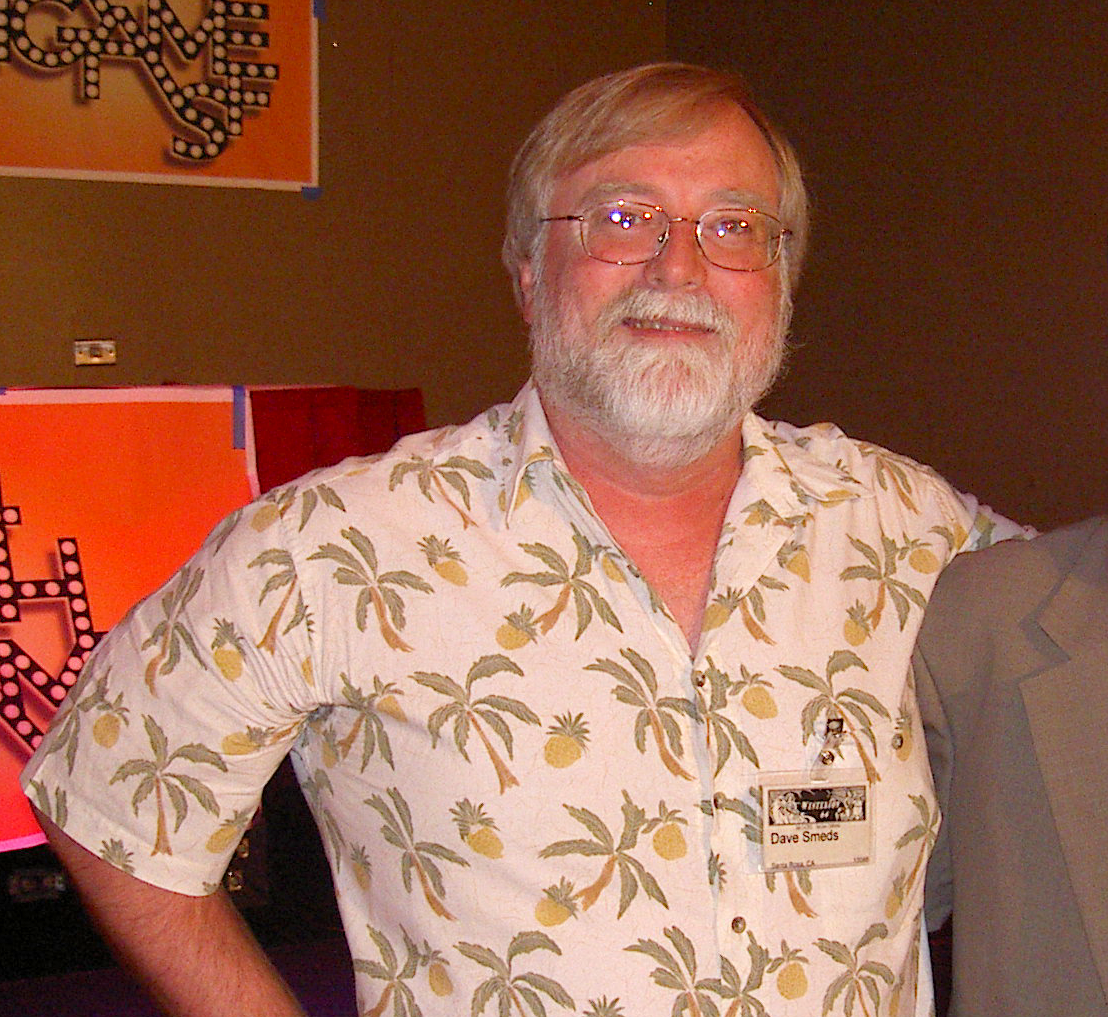
- Smeds at Westercon in 2011
- Born: 1955 (age 70–71); United States
- Education: Sonoma State University (BA)
- Occupation: Novelist
- Writing career
- Pen name: Reed Manning
- Genres: Science fiction & Fantasy

Dave Smeds (born 1955) is an American science fiction writer. To date he has written eleven books and over one hundred short stories. His story Short Timer, published in The Magazine of Fantasy & Science Fiction, was nominated for a Nebula Award for Best Short Story.

== Bibliography ==
=== War of the Dragons series ===
- The Sorcery Within (1985)
- The Schemes of Dragons (1989)

=== Novels ===
- Sinking Ship (1987)
- Goats (1987)
- The Law of the Jungle (1998) - X-Men series
- Piper in the Night (2001)
- Futures Near and Far (2014)

=== Short story collections ===
- Earthly Pleasures: The Erotic Science Fiction (1996)
- Embracing the Starlight (2002)
- Short Stories, Volume 1 (2003)
- Short Stories, Volume 2 (2003)
- Raiding the Hoard of Enchantment (2012)

=== Short stories ===
His short story "Dragon Touched" appeared in Dragons of Light edited by Orson Scott Card.

=== Non-fiction ===
- Chuck Norris: Martial Arts Masters (2001)
