= I'm Alive, I Love You, I'll See You in Reno =

"I'm Alive, I Love You, I'll See You in Reno" is a science fiction short story by Vylar Kaftan. It was first published in Lightspeed, in 2010.

== Synopsis ==
A woman writes a letter to her lover, from whom she has been separated by travel at relativistic speeds and time dilation.

== Reception ==
"I'm Alive, I Love You, I'll See You in Reno" was a finalist for the Nebula Award for Best Short Story in 2010.

In Locus, Lois Tilton applauded Kaftan's "use of metaphors to illustrate the complications of human relationships", but questioned what the narrator "sees in this guy". At Tangent Online, Bryan Thomas Schmidt noted Kaftan's "excellent gift for prose" and "descriptive and emotional language that keeps [the story] moving at a steady pace", but nonetheless observed that the story "feels like one long telling. There's not really any showing", with no dialogue, and limited character development; ultimately, Schmidt concluded that the story was "enjoyable, but (...) could have been better".
