= The Bookmaking Habits of Select Species =

2012 short story by Ken Liu

The Bookmaking Habits of Select Species is a short story by Ken Liu that compares and contrasts five fictional alien species' unique styles of reading and writing.

== Species ==
=== Allatians ===
A species of music who believe their writing system is superior to all. An Allatian author speaks as he writes, causing his nose to vibrate and etch grooves into the surface of a metal tablet covered in wax or clay. To read, one uses their nose to follow through the grooves, while a hollow chamber in their skull turns the vibrations to sound, recreating the author's voice, tone, emotion, and rhythm. However, every time a book is read it is damaged and some details are lost. In order to preserve the most precious works, they are locked away in forbidden libraries.

=== Quatzoli ===
Mechanical people, but it is unknown if they were always that way or are creations of another organism. Their bodies are made of hourglass shaped copper. A couple times a day, they take in water through their bottom chamber and then dip themselves into lava lakes. This causes steam to pass through the narrow part of their body and into the upper chamber to power various gears that allow the being to function. This process creates a stone that contains several millions of channels that water can pass through. As time goes on, the channels alter, causing memories to be lost and formed. A Quatzoli child is created in a forge and given a sliver of its parent's mind, which allows it to begin its life. As the child learns, its brain grows around the sliver until it is time to divide its mind for its own children. Because of this system, these beings are living books with accumulated knowledge passed down from their ancestors.

=== Hesperoe ===
The Hesperoes are depicted as historically violent. Although they once had their own form of writing, they no longer use it. They distrust writing because books convey facts and stories without solid proof to support their claims; instead, they wrote down their thoughts only when memories could not be trusted. Speech, debate, and the glories of war are among their favored pursuits. Once mind storage and mapping were discovered, they abandoned writing entirely. Before death, the minds of leaders and other notable individuals are harvested and mapped in detail, allowing their future thoughts to be predicted. Through these maps, the great minds of the Hesperoes are effectively preserved after death, with their memories accessible for guidance.

=== Tull-Toks ===
Ghost-like organisms made of energy that do not have a form of writing but claim that everything can be read. They travel by grabbing on to star ships of other species without being noticed. Tull-Toks believe each star is living text where each aspect of it serves a different purpose and that each planet has a poem. It is said that the greatest books lie within black holes but none of their kind has ever returned from such a reading, so many pass it off as a myth. Many species consider this organism to be an illiterate fraud that rely on such tales to hide their own ignorance.

=== Curu'ee ===
Organisms about the size of a period at the end of a sentence, they travel to obtain books that have lost all meaning and can no longer be read by the authors' descendants. Because many other races don't view the Curu'ee as a threat due to their size, they are capable of obtaining what they want without any trouble.

- Earth — The people of Earth gave them tablets and vases incised with linear A, bundles of knotted strings called quipus, and ancient magnetic discs and cubes that they no longer knew how to decipher.
- Hesperoe — After the Hesperoe had ceased their wars of conquest, they gave the Caru'ee ancient stones that they believed to be books looted from the Quatzoli.
- Untou — A species that writes using fragrances and flavors, they allowed the Curu'ee to have some old bland books whose scents were too faint to be read.

The Curu'ee built their cities from the unused books: vases and tablets turned into thoroughfares, quipu fibers were rewoven and tied into marketplaces, magnetic discs became entertainment arenas, and Quatzoli stone brains turned into a research complex. The Curu'ee "read without knowing they are reading."

== Background ==
Ken Liu drew his inspiration for The Bookmaking Habits of Select Species from his admiration of stories about whole groups of people or ideas, like Italo Calvino's Invisible Cities. This was his first serious attempt at writing in this style. Through this short story, Liu wanted to imagine forms of writing different from human's tangible form.

== Critical reception ==
Most agreed that the story was descriptive, less sentimental than most of Liu's other works, and written in an unusual format, but critics disagreed as to whether the format and lack of sentiment were an improvement.

== Awards and nominations ==
- Nominated for the 2012 Nebula Award for Best Short Story
- Finalist for the 2013 Theodore Sturgeon Memorial Award
- Finalist for the 2013 WSFA Small Press Award

== Publication history ==
- Originally published on August 7, 2012 in Lightspeed magazine issue 7 with the audio version read by Stefan Rudnicki
- Reprinted by io9 and in Aliens: Recent Encounters
- Polish Translation published on ksiazki.polter.pl on March 27, 2013
- A Chinese translation was published in Science Fiction World, July 2013
- Another Chinese translation was published in Douban Read by Xia Jia also in 2013
- Reprinted in Nebula Awards Showcase 2014 and edited by Kij Johnson
- Russian translation published in Kosmoport, December 2014
