= Daily Science Fiction =

Science fiction magazine

- Editors-in-Chief: Jonathan Laden and Michele Barasso
- Categories: Science fiction, Short fiction, Flash fiction
- Frequency: Daily
- First issue: September 1, 2010
- Country: United States
- Language: American English
- Website: Daily Science Fiction (via the Wayback Machine)

Daily Science Fiction was an American online science fiction magazine originally founded in September 2010 and edited by Jonathan Laden and Michele Barasso. New stories were published each weekday, with the magazine publishing on average 260 stories per year.

On 11 August 2022, the magazine announced it would go on hiatus, publishing its most recent story on 9 January 2023.

== Staff ==
Staff of Original online publication Jonathan Laden, Founder and Editor, Michele Barasso, Editor.

== Notable authors ==
Notable authors published in the first iteration of the magazine include:

- William Arthur
- Bruce Boston
- Paul Di Filippo
- Karina Fabian
- JG Faherty
- Eugie Foster
- Nina Kiriki Hoffman
- Eric Horwitz
- Stephen Jolly
- James Patrick Kelly
- Lancer Kind
- Mary Robinette Kowal
- Jay Lake
- David D. Levine
- Shelly Li
- Ken Liu
- Sandra McDonald
- Will McIntosh
- Steven Popkes
- Tim Pratt
- Cat Rambo
- Robert Reed
- Mike Resnick
- Ramon Rozas III
- Jason Sanford
- Eric James Stone
- Lavie Tidhar
- Greg van Eekhout
- James Van Pelt
- Michael Vella
- Leslie What
- Caroline M. Yoachim
