= Deborah P Kolodji =

American haiku poet

Deborah P Kolodji (née Deborah Pauline Anderson; August 11, 1959 – July 21, 2024) was an American haiku poet.

== Biography ==
=== Early life ===
Kolodji was born and raised in Southern California. She took an interest in poetry before she learned to read, enjoying the rhythms of nursery rhymes recited aloud.

Kolodji wrote poetry from an early age, including Star Trek-inspired verse as a teenager which appeared in fanzines in the 1970s. She credited a junior high school math and science teacher with a passion for poetry with encouraging her interest in formal verse in general, but stated that it was only as an adult that she came to take a specific interest in the haiku form.

=== Education and career ===
In 1981, Kolodji obtained a bachelor's degree in mathematics from the University of Southern California. In addition to her career as a poet, she has worked in information technology.

Kolodji made her first professional poetry sale in 1992. She began publishing poetry in the genres of science fiction and fantasy the following year. Hundreds of Kolodji's haiku and other short-form poems have since appeared in numerous anthologies and literary journals. She edited or co-edited several anthologies of English-language haiku, including Eclipse Moon (2017, with William Scott Galasso). She also acted as editor of Amaze: The Cinquain Journal, which she co-founded.

Kolodji was also the editor or co-editor of multiple anthologies of speculative verse, including several volumes of the annual Dwarf Stars anthologies collecting nominees for year's best very short science fiction and fantasy poetry and an issue of online speculative poetry journal Eye to the Telescope, a publication which she founded alongside Samantha Henderson.

Kolodji was president of the Science Fiction & Fantasy Poetry Association for five years, stepping down from the post in 2011. She also served as moderator of the Southern California Haiku Study Group at the USC Pacific Asia Museum in Pasadena and the California Regional Coordinator for the Haiku Society of America. From 2016 to 2024, Kolodji was also a board member of Haiku North America, a biennial conference devoted to haiku poetry.

=== Marriage and children ===
Kolodji divorced in 1992. She has two sons and a daughter. Two of her children are also published haiku poets.

=== Illness and death ===
Kolodji underwent treatment for cancer and other health issues for many years. She was in her Temple City, California home when she died on July 21, 2024. Her final published book, Vital Signs, is a collection of haiku inspired by her experiences combatting cancer.

== Published works ==
=== Poetry collections ===
Vital Signs (Cuttlefish Books, 2024)

Distance (Shabda Press, 2023, co-authored with Mariko Kitakubo)

Tug of a Black Hole (Title IX Press, 2021)

Highway of Sleeping Towns (Shabda Press, 2016)

Red Planet Dust (2007)

Symphony of the Universe (Sam's Dot Publishing, 2006)

Unfinished Book (Shadows Ink Publications, 2006)

Seaside Moon (Saki Press, 2004)

== Recognition ==
Kolodji's haiku collection Highway of Sleeping Towns was the recipient of a 2016 Touchstone Distinguished Books Award and received an honorable mention in the Haiku Society of America's 2017 Merit Book Awards.

Kolodji's fantasy scifaiku "Basho After Cinderella (iii)" placed first in the 2013 Dwarf Stars Awards and was collected in Nebula Awards Showcase 2015.

Kolodji's poem "Wildfire," written in collaboration with Billie Dee, won in the Rengay category of the Haiku Poets of Northern California contest in 2020. The following year, her poem "Perseverance," another collaboration with Billie Dee, placed third in the Haiku Society of America Rengay Awards.

In 2023 she was honoured by the SFPA as the inaugural winner of the Lifetime Service Award, for her services to the organisation.
