= Titanium Mike Saves the Day =

- Short story by David D. Levine
- Language: English
- Genre: Science fiction short story

Publication
- Published in: Fantasy & Science Fiction
- Publication type: Magazine
- Publication date: April 2007

"Titanium Mike Saves the Day " is a 2007 science fiction short story by David D. Levine. It was first published in The Magazine of Fantasy and Science Fiction.

== Plot summary ==
The story is composed of several small episodes set in the Solar System. In each one someone tells about an adventure of Titanium Mike (a man whose exploits in the Solar System range from incredible to unbelievable) to help solve their current problem.

== Reception ==
"Titanium Mike Saves the Day" was a finalist for the Nebula Award for Best Short Story of 2007.

Tangent Online praised it as "entertaining and engaging". At the SF Site, Paul Kincaid called it "another iteration of the evolution of trickster stories".
