= The Sword Smith =

Fantasy novel by Eleanor Arnason

- Cover for the first edition, with art by Abe Echevarria.
- Author: Eleanor Arnason
- Language: English
- Publisher: Condor
- Publication date: 1978

The Sword Smith is a low fantasy fiction novel by American writer Eleanor Arnason, published in 1978 by Condor. The beginning of the story plunges straight into the narration of a smith on the run, named Limper, with a young dragon named Nargri. Almost all explanations about who they are and why they are on the run are revealed through dialogues between the characters.

Unlike other fantasy novels which follow the traditional quest-formula, this novel subtly examines various themes of prejudice, artistic aspirations versus pragmatism, stoic acceptance of life and the right of a man to enjoy simple freedom, without weaving a grand major plot.

== Characters ==
Limper was the smith of King of Eshgorin. Dissatisfied with the work assigned to him by the king, he quit. But in his world, quitting is only possible if the king is not able to get his hands on him. Despite being not a fighter and having a limp, Limper demonstrates wit and a strong instinct for survival necessary in his pursuit to follow his own path.

Nargri is a young dragon companion of Limper. In this world, adult dragons were the size of adult humans, but were supposedly more advanced, having built cities when humans were still living in crude mud huts. By the time of the story, dragons were so rare that many thought them legends. It is revealed that dragons were sophisticated creatures and superior craftsmen compared to humans, but as the human race became dominant, many dragons sought to protect their culture by retreating underground. Nargri descended from the exceptions who believed dragons should remain above ground, to interact with the changing world, and that withdrawal from the world would lead to extinction.

== Publication details ==
- Arnason, Eleanor. The Sword Smith. 1978 Condor, New York. (ISBN 0-89516-028-5)
