= Tk'tk'tk =

Short story by David D. Levine

"Tk’tk’tk"
- Short story by David D. Levine
- Country: United States
- Language: English
- Genre: Science fiction

Publication
- Published in: Asimov's Science Fiction
- Publication type: magazine
- Publication date: March 2005

"Tk’tk’tk" is a science fiction short story written in 2005 by David D. Levine. It received the 2006 Hugo Award for Best Short Story.

== Premise ==
The story is about a penniless human salesman trying to sell software on an alien planet populated by giant, intelligent, impersonal (yet very humble) insects, many light years from Earth. The main character, Walker, has trouble with everything from his ability to sell his computer systems and gadgets, to paying for his hotel and participating in the local religious holiday. In the end he finds a uniquely spiritual restaurant that changes his life.

== Adaptations ==
=== Audio ===
Escape Pod published EP054: Tk’tk’tk read by Paul Tevis on May 18, 2006.
