= The Sounds of Old Earth =

2013 short story by Matthew Kressel

"The Sounds of Old Earth" is a science fiction short story by American writer Matthew Kressel, published in the January 2013 issue of Lightspeed Magazine. The story was nominated for a Nebula Award for Best Short Story and was included in the book Nebula Awards Showcase 2015.

== Plot summary ==
Abner, an old man who once designed technology to protect against toxins in Earth's atmosphere, has been laid off, and is now one of the few left on the planet. Most have relocated to New Earth, and Old Earth is now condemned. Shortly before the demolition is set to begin, Abner meets a group of teenage delinquents and invites them into his home, where he keeps frogs. He gets to know Lin, one of the teenagers, who will shortly be relocated to a lower-class planet called Wal-Mart Toyota, and tells her he plans to stay. The next day, the teenagers are gone.

The story then follows Abner's description of his first visit to New Earth. Abner goes to his son Josef's home for his grandson's birthday. His granddaughter, Rachael, is overjoyed that she has received a full scholarship to an orbital university. When she tells of her plans to travel to Old Earth and watch as it gets dismantled, an argument over Abner's home ensues. Abner defends Old Earth and tells Josef that he has forsaken his real home. Josef replies saying New Earth is now his home and that his family has a better life there. Abner is upset that his family feels no sense of belonging to Old Earth like himself.

The story then resumes three days after the kids left Abner's house. He learns from a holdout that the kids have all been evacuated to Wal-Mart Toyota, and Abner realizes that Lin cried at his house because she did not have much time left on Earth. On his way back home, he finds Rachael standing in front of it, and they have a very brief conversation. She tells him she traveled the long distance from New Earth simply to greet him. Rachael asks Abner to promise that he will not do anything reckless when he is forced to evacuate, then leaves.

The story then shifts to Abner reminiscing of happier times. He has a device that allows him to play back some of his memories, projecting them for him to see. He chooses to look at his grandchildren's visit many years ago, his late wife's sixtieth birthday (she died from the Earth's toxins, which Abner could not protect her from), and his son Josef's first steps. After viewing them, he sets his house on fire. The police arrive at dawn, and Abner is forced onto a ship to New Earth.

Josef rents Abner an apartment, but he is still not comfortable living on New Earth. One night, he watches as Earth is sliced up and wonders if there are any holdouts left there. The story then skips a few years to Rachael's college graduation. Upon Rachael's request, he leaves with her. They travel back down to New Earth and she tells him that for her graduation thesis she was assigned to recreate an Old Earth ecosystem, and decided to recreate Abner's backyard. Rachael shows him her creation, which has thousands of frogs that are the descendants of some frogs that she collected from Old Earth. She tells Abner that she did this for him so that he could feel a little more at home here. She gives him a deed to the land, and they agree that he will build a big house there, with a lot of room for guests.

== Reviews ==
The reviews for "The Sounds of Old Earth" are positive overall. Reviewers agree that the story was sentimental. Though it did not eliminate the prevailing sadness throughout, the ending of the story provided readers with a sense of hope for Abner's happiness and future on New Earth. Carl Anderson of Stainless Steel Droppings remarks that "The Sounds of Old Earth" is about family and connections. The story made him and other reviewers reflect on the importance of upholding one's heritage and belonging to a true home.
