= Time Deer =

Native American short story

"Time Deer" is a 1974 magic realism short story by Craig Strete. It was first published in Red Planet Earth, in June 1974, and subsequently republished in Worlds of If, in November 1974.

== Synopsis ==
As an elderly Native American resists the efforts of his son — and his son's white wife — to have him institutionalized, he recalls his own childhood, and his interactions with a particular deer... which may still be present.

== Reception ==
"Time Deer" was a finalist for the Nebula Award for Best Short Story in 1975. The New York Times called the story "elegiac", while Kirkus Reviews found it to be a "deft little fable".

Mike Ashley described it as "jarringly contrast(ing) beautiful Native American imagery alongside prejudice and violence". At Black Gate, Steven H Silver praised the "understated mysticism" underlying the protagonist's altered experience of time, and noted the ambiguity over whether the deer is actually present, but faulted the story as too brief and lacking sufficient "introspection".

Literary scholar Kristina Baudemann considered that the story "allude[s] to colonial horrors, but (...) confirm[s], rather than subvert[s], romanticized stereotypes", and observed that it "offer[s] no alternative plots to the vanishment trope", emphasizing that the deer's empathy with the old man "evokes the romanticized stereotype of Indigenous people as spiritual, close to nature, and endangered by white civilization."
