= In the Pound, Near Breaktime =

"In The Pound, Near Breaktime"
- Short story by Kent Brewster
- Country: United States
- Language: English
- Genre(s): Science fiction

Publication
- Published in: Tomorrow Speculative Fiction
- Publication type: magazine
- Publication date: October 1995

"In The Pound, Near Breaktime" is a science fiction short story written in 1995 by Kent Brewster. It was nominated for the 1997 Nebula Award for Best Short Story.

== Plot summary ==
The story is about a desk clerk who is checking in all the animals that are brought to the pound. It explores the idea of what might happen if unwanted pets, strays and pesky animals were intelligent enough to talk.
