= Shiv Ramdas =

Indian science fiction writer

- Occupation: Writer
- Website: shivramdas.net

Shiv Ramdas is an Indian writer of science fiction, humour, fantasy and horror.

== Works ==
His dystopian cyberpunk novel Domeсhild was published by Penguin India in 2013.

His short story "And Now His Lordship Is Laughing", published in 2019 in Strange Horizons, is set during the Bengal famine of 1943. It was nominated for both the 2020 Hugo Award for Best Short Story and the 2020 Nebula Award for Best Short Story. He is one of only two Indian writers to be nominated for both a Hugo Award and a Nebula Award in the same year.

He is a graduate of the Clarion West Writers Workshop.

A Twitter thread by Ramdas regarding the accidental ordering of a lorry full of rice by his brother-in-law went viral in 2020.
