= A Woman of the Iron People =

1991 novel by Eleanor Arnason

- First edition cover
- Author: Eleanor Arnason
- Language: English
- Genre: Science fiction
- Publisher: William Morrow & Co
- Publication date: April 1991
- Pages: 525
- ISBN: 0-688-10375-8
- OCLC: 22207447
- Dewey Decimal: 813/.54 20
- LC Class: PS3551.R4853 I5 1991

A Woman of the Iron People is an anthropological science fiction novel by American writer Eleanor Arnason, originally published in 1991. It is a first contact story between peoples from a future Earth and an intelligent, furred race of people who live on an unnamed planet far from Earth.

Along with White Queen, A Woman of the Iron People won the inaugural Otherwise Award in 1991. The later paperback edition consisted of two separate volumes, In the Light of Sigma Draconis and Changing Women, split at a point in the novel selected by the publisher.

== Plot ==
A Woman of the Iron people is divided into two parts. The first primarily deals with Lixia's growing understanding and involvement with life on the planet. Soon after arriving on the planet she meets Nia and starts to pick up the language of gifts, which is a sort of trade language, from her. They leave their current location and journey west, meeting Derek and the Voice of the Waterfall along the way.

The second part of the novel deals primarily with the question of intervention. The various factions of humans, most of whom are still in space, disagree as to how much the humans should intervene on the planet. Questions are raised about the policy of intervention.

== Characters ==
- Nia is the eponymous woman of the Iron People and a native of the alien planet.
- Lixia is a human from the expeditionary force to the planet; the bulk of the novel is written from her viewpoint.
- Derek is another human from the expeditionary force. He joins up with Nia and Lixia early on.
- The Voice of the Waterfall is a male of the same species as Nia. He joins Nia and Lixia when the spirit of his waterfall tells him to follow.

== Sources ==
- Arnason, Eleanor. A Woman of the Iron People. 1991: William and Morrow Company, Inc. New York.
- Otherwise Award (Formerly the Tiptree Award)
- "Precious Metals: Eleanor Arnason's A Woman of the Iron People" by John Garrison, March 29, 2004, Strange Horizons
