= Rat (short story) =

- Short story by James Patrick Kelly
- Language: English
- Genre: Science fiction

Publication
- Published in: The Magazine of Fantasy and Science Fiction
- Publication date: 1986

"Rat" is a science fiction short story by James Patrick Kelly. It was nominated for the Hugo Award for Best Short Story 1987, and the Nebula Award for Best Short Story in 1986. Also nominated for Lucas Poll Award category for best short story and also nominated for SF Chronicle Award for the same category. In 1986 "Rat" was published in The Magazine of Fantasy and Science Fiction.

== Plot summary ==
In this cyberpunk story the protagonist is literally a rat, though clearly not an ordinary one. Rat has been given the mission to smuggle a large amount of drugs, but decides that he wants to cut out the middle man and keep the entire haul for himself. Rat tries to sneak out of sight from the spook that was hired to watch him and the fed who was also put onto his tail. After, Rat is able to finally get away from the two and he makes it to his safe house. Only there he has to fight and claw to be able to move the drug haul and save his life as well.

== Cyberpunk ==
This story emphasizes the punk half of cyberpunk (for the cyber half, see Candace Jane Dorsey's "(Learning About) Machine Sex"). It takes place in a decaying society in which only scavengers like Rat can prosper. Rat is a criminal, a drug runner and murderer. He is selfish, amoral, vindictive. Yet the reader gets caught up in his plight and begins to empathize with him for two reasons. One is that stories do that to us: putting even a despicable character in the role of protagonist and filtering events through that character's perceptions automatically slants our responses toward that character, even against our moral judgment. The way the story is set up seduces us into rooting for Rat to get home, to outwit his pursuers, to make his score. The other reason is that Rat is not a person but an animal, literally a rat, and everything he does is consistent with rat behavior: stealing, hiding, killing, surviving. Once we get a sense of his appearance-furry, twenty-six inches high—he takes on something of the disarming quality of Mickey Mouse or the animals in The Wind in the Willows.

== Sources, references, external links, quotations ==
- Rat title listing at the Internet Speculative Fiction Database
