= Knapsack Poems =

"Knapsack Poems: A Goxhat Travel Journal" is a 2002 science fiction short story by Eleanor Arnason. It was first published in Asimov's Science Fiction.

== Synopsis ==
The multiple bodies of a traveling Goxhat poet find themselves in a very dangerous situation.

== Reception ==
"Knapsack Poems" was a finalist for the Nebula Award for Best Short Story of 2002, and included on the Honor List for the 2002 Otherwise Award.

Strange Horizons emphasized that the story demonstrates "the ability [of science fiction] to imagine the world in some other way," while the SF Site noted its "relentless humour and strangeness". Tangent Online praised its "imagination" and "sly comments about the life of a poet", calling it "so much fun to read".
