= Eleanor Arnason =

American science fiction writer (born 1942)

Eleanor Atwood Arnason
- Born: December 28, 1942 (age 83); New York City, United States
- Occupations: Novelist, short story writer
- Writing career
- Language: English
- Genre: science fiction

Eleanor Atwood Arnason (born December 28, 1942) is an American author of science fiction novels and short stories.

Arnason's earliest published story, "A Clear Day in the Motor City", appeared in New Worlds in 1973. Her work often depicts cultural change and conflict, usually from the viewpoint of characters who cannot or will not live by their own societies' rules. This anthropological focus has led many to compare her fiction to that of Ursula K. Le Guin.

Arnason won the inaugural James Tiptree Jr. Award in 1991 and the 1992 Mythopoeic Award for A Woman of the Iron People and in 2000 won the Gaylactic Spectrum Award for Best Short Fiction for "Dapple" and the HOMer Award for her novelette Stellar Harvest. Stellar Harvest was also nominated for a Hugo Award in 2000. In 2003, she was nominated for two Nebula Awards for her novella Potter of Bones and her short story "Knapsack Poems". In 2004, she was guest of honor at Wiscon. She lives in Minnesota.

== Background ==
Eleanor Arnason is the daughter of H. Harvard Arnason, a Canadian-born man of Icelandic descent, who worked as an art historian and became the director of the Walker Art Center in Minneapolis, Minnesota, in 1951, and Elizabeth Hickcox Yard Arnason, a social worker by profession who spent her childhood in a missionary community in western China. Arnason is the niece of the American feminist Molly Yard and her maternal grandparents were both Methodist missionaries. This Methodist influence would be visible in her works, most notably in Ring of Swords.

From 1949 to 1960, Arnason and her parents lived in Walker's "Idea House #2", a futuristic dwelling built next to the Walker Art Center. Arnason has said that her experience growing up around avant-garde artists in a futurist house, in addition to the influence of her feminist, socialist mother contributed to her preoccupation with the future, and consequently science fiction. Prior to 1949, Arnason's family moved frequently: from New York City to Chicago; Washington, D.C.; London; Paris; and St. Paul, Minnesota.

She graduated from Swarthmore College in 1964, with a B.A. in art history, and continued her education in graduate school at the University of Minnesota, until 1967. She spent the next seven years working as an office clerk in Brooklyn and then Detroit. Her time in these blue-collar, racially diverse areas helped to shape her understanding about class consciousness, conflict, and revolution—notions that are reflected in her works. Arnason moved back to Minneapolis–Saint Paul in 1974 and continued to work in offices, warehouses, a large art museum, and more recently, a series of small nonprofits devoted to history, peace, justice, and art.

Since 1994, she has shifted her literary focus from novels to short fiction. She retired in 2009 and now writes full-time.

== Politics ==
The issues that transpire most in Arnason's life and writings encompass feminism, peace, social justice, support for the union movement and a deep belief that racism and all forms of prejudice should be opposed. City Pages labelled Arnason as a political radical.

Having come of age during second-wave feminism, Arnason included gender and sexuality as central themes in her work, notably in her collection of Hwarhath stories, in which she "wanted to create a society in which homosexual love was normal and heterosexual love was abnormal, sort of as a thought experiment. And because contemporary Americans have very rigid ideas of what is normal." The Hwarhath stories also addressed issues of gender roles and reproductive rights.

She was profoundly affected by the McCarthy period, particularly because of the ways that children were taught to securitize against nuclear annihilation. She became involved in the Student Peace Union and attended demonstrations during the Cuban Missile Crisis. Ring of Swords, Arnason's Hwarhath novel, illustrates peacebuilding after a long war; an endeavor both representative of Arnason's peace beliefs and of the make love, not war politics of the 1960s.

In 1963, Arnason went to the March on Washington for Jobs and Freedom with her mother. This had a profound impact that would be reflected in her story "Big Brown Mama and Brer Rabbit" in which Brer Rabbit transforms into an African-American man in the early 20th century. Arnason has often opted for racially diverse characters, including, but not limited to, a heroine of Chinese descent in A Woman of the Iron People and a Hispanic heroine in Ring of Swords. In addition, her Lydia Duluth stories present a future in which an overwhelming majority of humans have dark brown and black toned skins as the best protection against the radiation of many stars.

Arnason had intermittent activist politics outside of her work as an author, working in a campaign office in New York, collecting and transporting supplies for striking coal miners in Kentucky, becoming a local and national official in the National Writers Union and engaging in Minnesota Democratic–Farmer–Labor Party precinct politics.

== Published works ==
=== Standalone novels ===
- —— (1978). The Sword Smith (mass market paperback ed.). Condor. pp. 1–208. ISBN 978-0895160287.
- —— (1986). To the Resurrection Station (mass market paperback ed.). Avon Book. pp. 1–276. ISBN 978-0380751105.
- —— (1987). Daughter of the Bear King (paperback ed.). Avon Book. pp. 1–256. ISBN 978-0380751099.
- —— (1991). A Woman of the Iron People (hardcover ed.). William Morrow. pp. 1–525. ISBN 978-0688103750.
  - —— (1992). Woman of the Iron People #1: In the Light of Sigma Draconis (mass market paperback ed.). Hearst Corporation. pp. 1–239. ISBN 978-0380756377.
  - —— (1992). Woman of the Iron People #2: Changing Women (mass market paperback ed.). AvoNova. pp. 1–262. ISBN 978-0380756384.

=== Collections ===
- —— (2005). Ordinary People (paperback ed.). Aqueduct Press. pp. 1–124. ISBN 978-0974655901.
- —— (2010). Mammoths of the Great Plains (paperback ed.). PM Press. pp. 1–144. ISBN 978-1604860757.
- —— (2013). Big Mama Stories (paperback ed.). Aqueduct Press. pp. 1–164. ISBN 978-1619760295.
- —— (2014). Hidden Folk (hardcover ed.). Many Worlds Press. pp. 1–192. ISBN 978-0990393405.

=== Standalone short stories ===
- "A Clear Day in the Motor City" (1973)
- "The Warlord of Saturn's Moons" (1974), available online
- "Ace 167" (1974)
- "The House by the Sea" (1975)
- "The Face on the Barroom Floor" (1976) with Ruth Berman
- "Going Down" (1977)
- "A Ceremony of Discontent" (1981)
- "The Ivory Comb" (1982)
- "Glam's Story" (1987)
- "Among the Featherless Bipeds" (1988)
- "A Brief History of the Order of St. Cyprian the Athlete" (1992)
- "The Dog's Story" (1996)
- "The Venetian Method" (1998)
- "Feeding the Mother: A Hwarhath Religious Anecdote" (1998)
- "The Grammarian's Five Daughters" (1999), available online
- "Origin Story" (2000)
- "The Lost Mother: A Story Told by the Divers" (2002)
- "The Potter of Bones" (2002), available online
- "Big Black mama and Tentacle Man" (2003)
- "Big Ugly Mama and the Zk" (2003)
- "Big Green Mama Falls in Love" (2006) in Eidolon I (ed. Jonathan Strahan, Jeremy G. Byrne)
- "The Diner" (2008)
- "Patrick and Mr. Bear: A True Story" (2010)
- "Mammoths of the Great Plains" (2010)
- "My Husband Steinn" (2011)
- "The Woman Who Fooled Death Five Times" (2012)
- "Big Red Mama in Time and Morris, Minnesota" (2013)
- "Big Brown Mama and Brer Rabbit" (2013)
- "Kormak the Lucky" (2013)
- "Ruins" (2015) in Old Venus (anthology)

=== Hwarhath stories ===
- —— (1993). Ring of Swords (hardcover ed.). Tor Books. pp. 1–383. ISBN 978-0312855185.
- "The Hound of Merin" (1993)
- "The Semen Thief" (1994)
- "The Lovers" (1994)
- "The Small Black Box of Morality" (1996)
- "The Gauze Banner" (1998)
- "Dapple: A Hwarhath Historical Romance" (1999)
- "The Actors" (1999)
- "The Garden: A Hwarhath Science Fictional Romance" (2004)
- "Holmes Sherlock: A Hwarhath Mystery" (2012)

=== Lydia Duluth stories ===
- "Stellar Harvest" (1999)
- "The Cloud Man" (2000)
- "Lifeline" (2001)
- "Moby Quilt" (2001)
- Tomb of the Fathers (2010)
- "Tunnels" (2020)
- "Checkerboard Planet" (2016) available online
- "Knapsack Poems" (2002)

"There are seven preceding Lydia Duluth stories, also three additional stories set in her universe. Most were published by Asimov’s."
This is a quote from Eleanor's comments in From Earth to the Stars

=== Poems ===
- "Poem (untitled)" (1976)
- "The Land of Ordinary People" (1985)
- "On the Border" (1986)
- "On Writing" (1986)
- "There Was an Old Lady ..." (1987)
- "Clean House Poem" (1988)
- "Mars Poem" (1988)
- "Poem Written After I Read an Article Which Argued That Birds Are Descended From Dinosaurs" (1988)
- "Dragon Poem" (1989)
- "Amnita and the Giant Stinginess" (1990)
- "The Glutton: A Goxhat Accounting Chant" (2001)
- "Song from the Kalevala" (2003)
- "Colline's Coat" (2003)
- "On Seeing Bellini's Opera The Capulets and Montagues..." (2003)

=== Essay ===
- "Me and Science Fiction: Hope for the Future", at Strange Horizons

=== Anthologies as editor ===
- Arnason, Eleanor; Garey, Terry A., eds. (1988). Time Gum and Other Poems from the Minicon Poetry Readings. Rune Press.

== Bibliography ==
- "Arnason, Eleanor". The Encyclopedia of Science Fiction. Aug 8, 2013. Web. Oct 27, 2013. < http://sf-encyclopedia.com/entry/arnason_eleanor>
- Arnason, Eleanor. Mammoths of the Great Plains PM Press. Seattle. 2010. Print.
- Arnason, Eleanor. "Writing Science-Fiction During the Third World War" Extrapolation 46.1 (2005): 10–16. Print.
- Attebery, Brian. "Ring of Swords: A Reappreciation" New York Review of Science Fiction 16.8, (2004): 8–10. Print.
- "Eleanor Arnason - Summary Bibliography" Internet Speculative Fiction Database. 24 April 2006. Web. Oct 27, 2013. <http://www.isfdb.org/cgi-bin/ea.cgi?313>
- Lenander, David. "An Eleanor Arnason Page" The Rivendell Group. Sept 2007. Web. Oct 27, 2013. <https://rivendellergroup.com/authors/eleanor-arnason/>
- Lenander, David. Interview with Eleanor Aranason. TV Bookshelf. Oct 2003. Web. Oct 27, 2013. <https://tvbookshelf.com/#EA>
- Lien, Denny. "A Chronological Eleanor Arnason Bibliography". The Rivendell Group. Mar 2004. Web. Oct 27, 2013. <https://rivendellergroup.com/authors/eleanor-arnason/eleanor-arnason-bibliography/>
- Lindow, Sandra J. "Eleanor Arnason" Women in Science Fiction: Overview, Greenswood Publishing, (2009). 12–13. Print.
- Morehouse, Lyda. "Interview: Eleanor Arnason" Strange Horizons Mar 29, 2004. Web. Oct 27, 2013 <https://web.archive.org/web/20131029193335/http://www.strangehorizons.com/2004/20040329/arnason.shtml>
- "Science Fiction, Fantasy and Horror Authors: Eleanor Arnason" Worlds Without End. 2011. Web. Oct 27, 2013. <https://www.worldswithoutend.com/author.asp?ID=425>
