= Craig Strete =

American novelist

Craig Kee Strete (born 6 May 1950) is an American science fiction writer of Cherokee descent. He is noted for his use of American Indian themes and has had multiple Nebula Award nominations.

== Career ==
Beginning in the early 1970s, while working in the Film and Television industry, Strete began writing emotional Native American themed, and science fiction short stories and novellas. He has had three Nebula Award nominations: two for the short stories Time Deer and A Sunday Visit with Great-grandfather and one for the novelette The Bleeding Man.

In 1974 Strete published a magazine dedicated to Native American science fiction, Red Planet Earth. His play Paint Your Face On A Drowning In The River (originally produced May 16, 1984 by East/West Players in Los Angeles, CA) was the 1984 Dramatists Guild/CBS New Plays Program first-place winner.

Strete has published four collections of short fiction: The Bleeding Man and Other Science Fiction Stories, If All Else Fails..., Dreams That Burn in the Night and Death Chants. He has also published two novels, To Make Death Love Us (published under the name Sovereign Falconer) and Death in the Spirit House.

== Bibliography ==
- The Bleeding Man (1978)
- Paint Your Face On a Drowning in the River (1978)
- When Grandfather Journeys into Winter (1979)
- Dark Journey (1979)
- If All Else Fails (1980)
- Burn Down the Night (1982)
- Dreams That Burn in the Night (1982)
- Death in the Spirit House (1988)
- Big Thunder Magic (1990)
- The World in Grandfather's Hands (1995)
- How the Indians Bought the Farm (1996)
- They Thought They Saw Him (1996)
- Little Coyote Runs Away (1997)
- The Lost Boy And The Monster (1997)
- The Rattlesnake Who Went To School (2004)
