= Always (short story) =

- Short story by Karen Joy Fowler
- Language: English
- Genre(s): Science fiction

Publication
- Published in: Asimov's Science Fiction
- Publication type: Short story
- Publisher: Dell Magazines
- Publication date: April/May 2007

"Always" is a science fiction short story by American writer Karen Joy Fowler. Originally published in Asimov's Science Fiction, it won the 2007 Nebula Award for Best Short Story.

== Synopsis ==
"Always" is set in a commune led by Brother Porter in the city of Always, where inhabitants are immortal. His rules are that men and women must sleep in separate buildings, regardless of marital status, and that women must service him sexually. Men are expected to remain celibate. Inhabitants are not forbidden from visiting the outside world or enjoying its benefits, however a lack of interest is encouraged by Brother Porter. No concrete proof is given for the existence of the immortality and Brother Porter demands that his word be accepted on faith, as he also implies that it only works for believers.

The story is narrated by a young woman who arrives with her boyfriend as a teenager, but chooses to remain when he leaves because of his dissatisfaction over the commune rules. Always is occasionally visited by curious tourists, but this tapers off over time, to the consternation of Brother Porter. The narrator describes how Brother Porter evicts people for various reasons; two men are evicted for homosexuality while a married couple must leave because they are suspected to be journalists. As the woman spends more time in the commune her mind begins to dull due to the repetition and growing disinterest in the outside world.

Brother Porter is eventually murdered by one of the inhabitants, Frankie, who poisoned his Hawaiian Punch. She did not believe that it would kill him and she could use this as proof that she was more devout than the others. During the trial lawyers describe the commune as a mentally unstable cult and the narrator realizes that she is unable to determine whether she has been with the commune for about twenty years or less than five. Frankie is found not guilty by reason of insanity and two days later, another commune member murders four people; the courts sentence him to life in prison. The narrator later claims to have survived being shot in the heart due to immortality. The remaining members leave the commune or die off, leaving only the narrator behind. Her former boyfriend comes to take her away, however she chooses to remain in Always because she still believes in the immortality and is completely disinterested in the outside world.

== Release ==
"Always" was first published in the April/May 2007 issue of Asimov's Science Fiction. It was then republished in several "best of" volumes collecting science fiction stories from that year such as Year's Best SF 13 and Science Fiction: The Best of the Year, 2008 Edition. Fowler later included the story in her collection What I Didn't See and Other Stories, which was first published in 2010 by Small Beer Press.

== Awards ==
- Nebula Award for Best Short Story (2007, won)
