= Nebula Award for Best Short Story =

Science fiction and fantasy literary award

- Awarded for: The best science fiction or fantasy story of less than 7,500 words published in the prior calendar year
- Presented by: Science Fiction and Fantasy Writers Association
- First award: 1966
- Most recent winner: Effie Seiberg (Laser Eyes Ain’t Everything)
- Website: nebulas.sfwa.org

The Nebula Award for Best Short Story is a literary award assigned each year by Science Fiction and Fantasy Writers Association (SFWA) for science fiction or fantasy short stories. A work of fiction is defined by the organization as a short story if it is less than 7,500 words; awards are also given out for longer works in the categories of novel, novella, and novelette. To be eligible for Nebula Award consideration a short story must be published in English in the United States. Works published in English elsewhere in the world are also eligible provided they are released on either a website or in an electronic edition. The Nebula Award for Best Short Story has been awarded annually since 1966. The award has been described as one of "the most important of the American science fiction awards" and "the science-fiction and fantasy equivalent" of the Emmy Awards.

Nebula Award nominees and winners are chosen by members of SFWA, though the authors of the nominees do not need to be a member. Works are nominated each year by members in a period around December 15 through January 31, and the six works that receive the most nominations then form the final ballot, with additional nominees possible in the case of ties. Soon after, members are given a month to vote on the ballot, and the final results are presented at the Nebula Awards ceremony in May. Authors are not permitted to nominate their own works, and ties in the final vote are broken, if possible, by the number of nominations the works received. Beginning with the 2009 awards, the rules were changed to the current format. Prior to then, the eligibility period for nominations was defined as one year after the publication date of the work, which allowed the possibility for works to be nominated in the calendar year after their publication and then reach the final ballot in the calendar year after that. Works were added to a preliminary ballot for the year if they had ten or more nominations, which were then voted on to create a final ballot, to which the SFWA organizing panel was also allowed to add an additional work.

During the 61 nomination years, 247 authors have had works nominated; 47 of these have won, including co-authors. One of these authors, Lisa Tuttle, refused her award, and in 1971 no winner was chosen as "no award" received the highest number of votes. Harlan Ellison won three times out of eight nominations, both the highest number of wins and the highest number of nominations of any author. Ten authors have won twice, with Karen Joy Fowler at seven and Gardner Dozois at six having the next highest nomination count after Ellison. Michael Swanwick has the most nominations for short story without winning at six, and Howard Waldrop and Gene Wolfe are next with five each. No other author has been nominated more than four times.

== Winners and nominees ==
SFWA currently identifies the awards by the year of publication, that is, the year prior to the year in which the award is given. Entries with a yellow background and an asterisk (*) next to the writer's name have won the award; the other entries are the other nominees on the shortlist. Entries with a gray background and a plus sign (+) mark a year when "no award" was selected as the winner.

* Winners and joint winners
+ No winner selected

Winners and nominees
Year	Author(s)	Short story	Publisher or publication	Ref.
1965	Harlan Ellison*	"'Repent, Harlequin!' Said the Ticktockman"	Galaxy Science Fiction	
1965	Isaac Asimov	"Eyes Do More Than See"	The Magazine of Fantasy & Science Fiction	
1965	Isaac Asimov	"Founding Father"	Galaxy Science Fiction	
1965	J. G. Ballard	"Souvenir"	Playboy	
1965	Donald Barthelme	"Game"	The New Yorker	
1965	Jane Beauclerk	"Lord Moon"	The Magazine of Fantasy & Science Fiction	
1965	Lin Carter	"Uncollected Works"	The Magazine of Fantasy & Science Fiction	
1965	John Christopher	"A Few Kindred Spirits"	The Magazine of Fantasy & Science Fiction	
1965	Avram Davidson	"The House the Blakeneys Built"	The Magazine of Fantasy & Science Fiction	
1965	Gordon R. Dickson	"Computers Don't Argue"	Analog Science Fact & Fiction	
1965	Thomas M. Disch	"Come to Venus Melancholy"	The Magazine of Fantasy & Science Fiction	
1965	James A. Durham	"Of One Mind"	If	
1965	H. L. Gold	"Inside Man"	Galaxy Science Fiction	
1965	Ron Goulart	"Calling Dr. Clockwork"	Amazing Stories	
1965	Alex Kirs	"Better Than Ever"	The Magazine of Fantasy & Science Fiction	
1965	R. A. Lafferty	"In Our Block"	If	
1965	R. A. Lafferty	"Slow Tuesday Night"	Galaxy Science Fiction	
1965	Fritz Leiber	"Cyclops"	Worlds of Tomorrow	
1965	Fritz Leiber	"The Good New Days"	Galaxy Science Fiction	
1965	Larry McCombs	"The Peacock King"	The Magazine of Fantasy & Science Fiction	
1965	Ted White	"The Peacock King"	The Magazine of Fantasy & Science Fiction	
1965	Scott Nichols	"Though a Sparrow Fall"	Analog Science Fact & Fiction	
1965	Larry Niven	"Becalmed in Hell"	The Magazine of Fantasy & Science Fiction	
1965	Larry Niven	"Wrong-Way Street"	Galaxy Science Fiction	
1965	Richard Olin	"The Mischief Maker"	Analog Science Fact & Fiction	
1965	Edgar Pangborn	"A Better Mousehole"	Galaxy Science Fiction	
1965	Mack Reynolds	"A Leader for Yesteryear"	If	
1965	Robert Rohrer	"Keep Them Happy"	The Magazine of Fantasy & Science Fiction	
1965	James H. Schmitz	"Balanced Ecology"	Analog Science Fact & Fiction	
1965	Clifford D. Simak	"Over the River and Through the Woods"	Amazing Stories	
1965	Richard Wilson	"The Eight Billion"	The Magazine of Fantasy & Science Fiction	
1965	Roger Zelazny	"Devil Car"	Galaxy Science Fiction	
1966	Richard McKenna*	"The Secret Place"	Orbit 1 (G. P. Putnam's Sons)	
1966	Brian Aldiss	"Man In His Time"	Who Can Replace a Man? (Harcourt, Brace & World)	
1966	Bob Shaw	"Light of Other Days"	Analog Science Fact & Fiction	
1967	Samuel R. Delany*	""Aye, and Gomorrah…""	Dangerous Visions (Doubleday)	
1967	Reginald Bretnor	"Earthwoman"	The Magazine of Fantasy & Science Fiction	
1967	Samuel R. Delany	"Driftglass"	If	
1967	Fritz Leiber	"Answering Service"	If	
1967	Theodore L. Thomas	"The Doctor"	Orbit 2 (G. P. Putnam's Sons)	
1967	Kate Wilhelm	"Baby, You Were Great"	Orbit 2 (G. P. Putnam's Sons)	
1968	Kate Wilhelm*	"The Planners"	Orbit 3 (G. P. Putnam's Sons)	
1968	Poul Anderson	"Kyrie"	The Farthest Reaches (Trident Press)	
1968	Terry Carr	"The Dance of the Changer and the Three"	The Farthest Reaches (Trident Press)	
1968	H. H. Hollis	"Sword Game"	Galaxy Science Fiction	
1968	Damon Knight	"Masks"	Playboy	
1968	Robert Taylor	"Idiot's Mate"	Amazing Stories	
1969	Robert Silverberg*	"Passengers"	Orbit 4 (G. P. Putnam's Sons)	
1969	Harlan Ellison	"Shattered Like a Glass Goblin"	Orbit 4 (G. P. Putnam's Sons)	
1969	Larry Niven	"Not Long Before the End"	The Magazine of Fantasy & Science Fiction	
1969	Theodore Sturgeon	"The Man Who Learned Loving"	The Magazine of Fantasy & Science Fiction	
1969	James Tiptree, Jr.	"The Last Flight of Dr. Ain"	Galaxy Science Fiction	
1970	(no award)+			
1970	Gardner Dozois	"A Dream at Noonday"	Orbit 7 (G. P. Putnam's Sons)	
1970	Harry Harrison	"By the Falls"	If	
1970	R. A. Lafferty	"Entire and Perfect Chrysolite"	Orbit 6 (G. P. Putnam's Sons)	
1970	Keith Laumer	"In the Queue"	Orbit 7 (G. P. Putnam's Sons)	
1970	James Sallis	"The Creation of Bennie Good"	Orbit 6 (G. P. Putnam's Sons)	
1970	Kate Wilhelm	"A Cold Dark Night with Snow"	Orbit 6 (G. P. Putnam's Sons)	
1970	Gene Wolfe	"The Island of Doctor Death and Other Stories"	Orbit 7 (G. P. Putnam's Sons)	
1971	Robert Silverberg*	"Good News from the Vatican"	Universe 1 (Doubleday)	
1971	Gardner Dozois	"Horse of Air"	Orbit 8 (G. P. Putnam's Sons)	
1971	Stephen Goldin	"The Last Ghost"	Protostars (Ballantine Books)	
1971	George Zebrowski	"Heathen God"	The Magazine of Fantasy & Science Fiction	
1972	Joanna Russ*	"When It Changed"	Again, Dangerous Visions (Doubleday)	
1972	Harlan Ellison	"On the Downhill Side"	Universe 2 (Doubleday)	
1972	Frederik Pohl	"Shaffery Among the Immortals"	The Magazine of Fantasy & Science Fiction	
1972	Robert Silverberg	"When We Went to See the End of the World"	Universe 2 (Doubleday)	
1972	James Tiptree, Jr.	"And I Awoke and Found Me Here on the Cold Hill's Side"	The Magazine of Fantasy & Science Fiction	
1972	Gene Wolfe	"Against the Lafayette Escadrille"	Again, Dangerous Visions (Doubleday)	
1973	James Tiptree, Jr.*	"Love Is the Plan the Plan Is Death"	The Alien Condition (Ballantine Books)	
1973	Edward Bryant	"Shark"	Orbit 12 (G. P. Putnam's Sons)	
1973	George R. R. Martin	"With Morning Comes Mistfall"	Analog Science Fact & Fiction	
1973	Vonda N. McIntyre	"Wings"	The Alien Condition (Ballantine Books)	
1973	Norman Spinrad	"A Thing of Beauty"	Analog Science Fact & Fiction	
1973	Gene Wolfe	"How I Lost the Second World War and Helped Turn Back the German Invasion"	Analog Science Fact & Fiction	
1974	Ursula K. Le Guin*	"The Day Before the Revolution"	Galaxy Science Fiction	
1974	Philip José Farmer	"After King Kong Fell"	Omega (Walker & Co.)	
1974	Roger Zelazny	"The Engine at Heartspring's Center"	Analog Science Fact & Fiction	
1975	Fritz Leiber*	"Catch That Zeppelin!"	The Magazine of Fantasy & Science Fiction	
1975	Gregory Benford	"Doing Lennon"	Analog Science Fact & Fiction	
1975	Gregory Benford	"White Creatures"	New Dimensions 5 (Harper & Row)	
1975	Jorge Luis Borges	"Utopia of a Tired Man"	The New Yorker	
1975	Algis Budrys	"A Scraping at the Bones"	Analog Science Fact & Fiction	
1975	Phyllis Eisenstein	"Attachment"	Amazing Stories	
1975	Harlan Ellison	"Shatterday"	Gallery	
1975	Nicholas Fisk	"Find the Lady"	New Dimensions 5 (Harper & Row)	
1975	Charles L. Grant	"White Wolf Calling"	The Magazine of Fantasy & Science Fiction	
1975	Richard A. Lupoff	"Sail the Tide of Mourning"	New Dimensions 5 (Harper & Row)	
1975	P. J. Plauger	"Child of All Ages"	Analog Science Fact & Fiction	
1975	Frederik Pohl	"Growing Up in Edge City"	Epoch (Berkley Books)	
1975	Craig Strete	"Time Deer"	If	
1976	Charles L. Grant*	"A Crowd of Shadows"	The Magazine of Fantasy & Science Fiction	
1976	Joe Haldeman	"Tricentennial"	Analog Science Fact & Fiction	
1976	Thomas F. Monteleone	"Breath's a Ware That Will Not Keep"	Dystopian Visions (Prentice Hall)	
1976	Jake Saunders	"Back to the Stone Age"	Lone Star Universe (Heidelberg Publishers)	
1976	Lisa Tuttle	"Stone Circle"	Amazing Stories	
1976	Howard Waldrop	"Mary Margaret Road-Grader"	Orbit 18 (G. P. Putnam's Sons)	
1977	Harlan Ellison*	"Jeffty Is Five"	The Magazine of Fantasy & Science Fiction	
1977	Dennis R. Bailey	"Tin Woodman"	Amazing Stories	
1977	David Bischoff	"Tin Woodman"	Amazing Stories	
1977	Edward Bryant	"The Hibakusha Gallery"	Penthouse	
1977	Thomas F. Monteleone	"Camera Obscura"	Cosmos	
1977	John Varley	"Air Raid"	Asimov's Science Fiction	
1978	Edward Bryant*	"Stone"	The Magazine of Fantasy & Science Fiction	
1978	C. J. Cherryh	"Cassandra"	The Magazine of Fantasy & Science Fiction	
1978	Jack Dann	"A Quiet Revolution for Death"	New Dimensions 8 (Harper & Row)	
1979	Edward Bryant*	"giANTS"	Analog Science Fact & Fiction	
1979	Michael Bishop	"Vernalfest Morning"	Chrysalis 3 (Zebra Books)	
1979	Orson Scott Card	"Unaccompanied Sonata"	Omni	
1979	Tanith Lee	"Red as Blood"	The Magazine of Fantasy & Science Fiction	
1979	George R. R. Martin	"The Way of Cross and Dragon"	Omni	
1979	Joanna Russ	"The Extraordinary Voyages of Amélie Bertrand"	The Magazine of Fantasy & Science Fiction	
1980	Clifford D. Simak*	"Grotto of the Dancing Deer"	Analog Science Fact & Fiction	
1980	Charles L. Grant	"Secrets of the Heart"	The Magazine of Fantasy & Science Fiction	
1980	Bob Leman	"Window"	The Magazine of Fantasy & Science Fiction	
1980	Gene Wolfe	"War Beneath the Tree"	Omni	
1980	Craig Strete (withdrawn)	"A Sunday Visit with Great-Grandfather"	New Dimensions 11 (Harper & Row)	
1981	Lisa Tuttle* (refused) (Note: Lisa Tuttle unsuccessfully attempted to withdraw "The Bone Flute" from the final ballot, and then refused the award when it won, because George Guthridge had sent copies of his story "The Quiet" to SFWA members in an attempt to solicit votes. The award was collected on her behalf by Pocket Books's editor John Douglas, and no mention of her refusal was made at the awards ceremony.)	"The Bone Flute"	The Magazine of Fantasy & Science Fiction	
1981	Jack Dann	"Going Under"	Omni	
1981	Gardner Dozois	"Disciples"	Penthouse	
1981	William Gibson	"Johnny Mnemonic"	Omni	
1981	George Guthridge	"The Quiet"	The Magazine of Fantasy & Science Fiction	
1981	Kim Stanley Robinson	"Venice Drowned"	Universe 11 (Doubleday)	
1981	Timothy R. Sullivan	"Zeke"	Twilight Zone	
1981	John Varley	"The Pusher"	The Magazine of Fantasy & Science Fiction	
1982	Connie Willis*	"A Letter from the Clearys"	Asimov's Science Fiction	
1982	Greg Bear	"Petra"	Omni	
1982	Jack C. Haldeman II	"High Steel"	The Magazine of Fantasy & Science Fiction	
1982	Jack Dann	"High Steel"	The Magazine of Fantasy & Science Fiction	
1982	Barry N. Malzberg	"Corridors"	The Engines of the Night (Doubleday)	
1982	Robert Silverberg	"The Pope of the Chimps"	Perpetual Light (Warner Books)	
1982	Howard Waldrop	"God's Hooks!"	Universe 12 (Doubleday)	
1983	Gardner Dozois*	"The Peacemaker"	Asimov's Science Fiction	
1983	Leigh Kennedy	"Her Furry Face"	Asimov's Science Fiction	
1983	Jack McDevitt	"Cryptic"	Asimov's Science Fiction	
1983	Chad Oliver	"Ghost Town"	Analog Science Fact & Fiction	
1983	Hilbert Schenck	"The Geometry of Narrative"	Analog Science Fact & Fiction	
1983	William F. Wu	"Wong's Lost and Found Emporium"	Amazing Stories	
1984	Gardner Dozois*	"Morning Child"	Omni	
1984	George Alec Effinger	"The Aliens Who Knew, I Mean, Everything"	The Magazine of Fantasy & Science Fiction	
1984	Lucius Shepard	"Salvador"	The Magazine of Fantasy & Science Fiction	
1984	Bruce Sterling	"Sunken Gardens"	Omni	
1984	Gene Wolfe	"A Cabin on the Coast"	The Magazine of Fantasy & Science Fiction	
1984	George Zebrowski	"The Eichmann Variations"	Light Years and Dark (Berkley Books)	
1985	Nancy Kress*	"Out of All Them Bright Stars"	The Magazine of Fantasy & Science Fiction	
1985	James Blaylock	"Paper Dragons"	Imaginary Lands (Ace Books)	
1985	John Crowley	"Snow"	Omni	
1985	Gardner Dozois	"The Gods of Mars"	Omni	
1985	Jack Dann	"The Gods of Mars"	Omni	
1985	Michael Swanwick	"The Gods of Mars"	Omni	
1985	Joe Haldeman	"More Than the Sum of His Parts"	Playboy	
1985	Howard Waldrop	"Flying Saucer Rock & Roll"	Omni	
1985	Howard Waldrop	"Heirs of the Perisphere"	Playboy	
1985	William F. Wu	"Hong's Bluff"	Omni	
1986	Greg Bear*	"Tangents"	Omni	
1986	Isaac Asimov	"Robot Dreams"	Asimov's Science Fiction	
1986	Pat Cadigan	"Pretty Boy Crossover"	Asimov's Science Fiction	
1986	James Patrick Kelly	"Rat"	The Magazine of Fantasy & Science Fiction	
1986	Nancy Springer	"The Boy Who Plaited Manes"	The Magazine of Fantasy & Science Fiction	
1986	Howard Waldrop	"The Lions Are Asleep This Night"	Omni	
1987	Kate Wilhelm*	"Forever Yours, Anna"	Omni	
1987	Pat Cadigan	"Angel"	Asimov's Science Fiction	
1987	Paul Di Filippo	"Kid Charlemagne"	Amazing Stories	
1987	Karen Joy Fowler	"The Faithful Companion at Forty"	Asimov's Science Fiction	
1987	Lisa Goldstein	"Cassandra's Photographs"	Asimov's Science Fiction	
1987	Susan Shwartz	"Temple to a Minor Goddess"	Amazing Stories	
1987	Lawrence Watt-Evans	"Why I Left Harry's All-Night Hamburgers"	Asimov's Science Fiction	
1988	James K. Morrow*	"Bible Stories for Adults, No. 17: The Deluge"	Full Spectrum (Bantam Spectra)	
1988	Thomas M. Disch	"Voices of the Kill"	Full Spectrum (Bantam Spectra)	
1988	John Kessel	"Mrs. Shummel Exits a Winner"	Asimov's Science Fiction	
1988	Jack McDevitt	"The Fort Moxie Branch"	Full Spectrum (Bantam Spectra)	
1988	Pat Murphy	"Dead Men on TV"	Full Spectrum (Bantam Spectra)	
1988	Steven Popkes	"The Color Winter"	Asimov's Science Fiction	
1989	Geoffrey A. Landis*	"Ripples in the Dirac Sea"	Asimov's Science Fiction	
1989	Mary C. Aldridge	"The Adinkra Cloth"	Marion Zimmer Bradley's Fantasy Magazine	
1989	Michael Bishop	"The Ommatidium Miniatures"	The Microverse (Bantam Spectra)	
1989	Orson Scott Card	"Lost Boys"	The Magazine of Fantasy & Science Fiction	
1989	Suzy McKee Charnas	"Boobs"	Asimov's Science Fiction	
1989	Bruce Sterling	"Dori Bangs"	Asimov's Science Fiction	
1990	Terry Bisson*	"Bears Discover Fire"	Asimov's Science Fiction	
1990	Pat Cadigan	"The Power and the Passion"	Omni	
1990	Karen Joy Fowler	"Lieserl"	Asimov's Science Fiction	
1990	Pat Murphy	"Love and Sex Among the Invertebrates"	Alien Sex (Dutton Penguin)	
1990	Kim Stanley Robinson	"Before I Wake"	Asimov's Science Fiction	
1990	Kristine Kathryn Rusch	"Story Child"	Aboriginal SF	
1991	Alan Brennert*	"Ma Qui"	The Magazine of Fantasy & Science Fiction	
1991	Terry Bisson	"They're Made Out of Meat"	Omni	
1991	Karen Joy Fowler	"The Dark"	The Magazine of Fantasy & Science Fiction	
1991	John Kessel	"Buffalo"	The Magazine of Fantasy & Science Fiction	
1991	Martha Soukup	"Dog's Life"	Amazing Stories	
1991	W. Gregory Stewart	"The Button, and What You Know"	Amazing Stories	
1992	Connie Willis*	"Even the Queen"	Asimov's Science Fiction	
1992	Michael Bishop	"Life Regarded as a Jigsaw Puzzle of Highly Lustrous Cats"	Omni	
1992	Paul Di Filippo	"Lennon Spex"	Amazing Stories	
1992	Nancy Kress	"The Mountain to Mohammed"	Asimov's Science Fiction	
1992	Kim Stanley Robinson	"Vinland the Dream"	Asimov's Science Fiction	
1992	Martha Soukup	"The Arbitrary Placement of Walls"	Asimov's Science Fiction	
1993	Joe Haldeman*	"Graves"	The Magazine of Fantasy & Science Fiction	
1993	Harlan Ellison	"The Man Who Rowed Christopher Columbus Ashore"	Omni	
1993	Esther Friesner	"All Vows"	Asimov's Science Fiction	
1993	Lisa Goldstein	"Alfred"	Asimov's Science Fiction	
1993	Bridget McKenna	"The Good Pup"	The Magazine of Fantasy & Science Fiction	
1993	William John Watkins	"The Beggar in the Living Room"	Asimov's Science Fiction	
1994	Martha Soukup*	"A Defense of the Social Contracts"	Science Fiction Age	
1994	Ben Bova	"Inspiration"	The Magazine of Fantasy & Science Fiction	
1994	Joe Haldeman	"None So Blind"	Asimov's Science Fiction	
1994	Barry N. Malzberg	"Understanding Entropy"	Science Fiction Age	
1994	Maureen F. McHugh	"Virtual Love"	The Magazine of Fantasy & Science Fiction	
1994	Kate Wilhelm	"I Know What You're Thinking"	Asimov's Science Fiction	
1995	Esther Friesner*	"Death and the Librarian"	Asimov's Science Fiction	
1995	Kelley Eskridge	"Alien Jane"	Century	
1995	Owl Goingback	"Grass Dancer"	Excalibur (Warner Aspect)	
1995	Lisa Goldstein	"The Narcissus Plague"	Asimov's Science Fiction	
1995	Geoffrey A. Landis	"The Kingdom of Cats and Birds"	Science Fiction Age	
1995	Maureen F. McHugh	"The Lincoln Train"	The Magazine of Fantasy & Science Fiction	
1995	Dave Smeds	"Short Timer"	The Magazine of Fantasy & Science Fiction	
1996	Esther Friesner*	"A Birthday"	The Magazine of Fantasy & Science Fiction	
1996	Kent Brewster	"In the Pound, Near Breaktime"	Tomorrow Speculative Fiction	
1996	Kathleen Ann Goonan	"The String"	The Magazine of Fantasy & Science Fiction	
1996	Jonathan Lethem	"Five Fucks"	The Wall of the Sky, The Wall of the Eye (Harcourt Brace)	
1996	Bruce Holland Rogers	"These Shoes Strangers Have Died Of"	Enchanted Forests (DAW Books)	
1996	Dean Wesley Smith	"In the Shade of the Slowboat Man"	The Magazine of Fantasy & Science Fiction	
1997	Jane Yolen*	"Sister Emily's Lightship"	Starlight 1 (Tor Books)	
1997	Gregory Feeley	"The Crab Lice"	Alternate Tyrants (Tor Books)	
1997	Karen Joy Fowler	"The Elizabeth Complex"	Crank!	
1997	James Patrick Kelly	"Itsy Bitsy Spider"	Asimov's Science Fiction	
1997	Michael Swanwick	"The Dead"	Starlight 1 (Tor Books)	
1997	K. D. Wentworth	"Burning Bright"	Aboriginal SF	
1998	Bruce Holland Rogers*	"Thirteen Ways to Water"	Black Cats and Broken Mirrors (DAW Books)	
1998	Steven Brust	"When the Bow Breaks"	The Essential Bordertown (Tor Books)	
1998	Karen Joy Fowler	"Standing Room Only"	Asimov's Science Fiction	
1998	Lisa Goldstein	"Fortune and Misfortune"	Asimov's Science Fiction	
1998	Geoffrey A. Landis	"Winter Fire"	Asimov's Science Fiction	
1998	K. D. Wentworth	"Tall One"	The Magazine of Fantasy & Science Fiction	
1999	Leslie What*	"The Cost of Doing Business"	Amazing Stories	
1999	Constance Ash	"Flower Kiss"	Realms of Fantasy	
1999	Bruce Holland Rogers	"The Dead Boy at Your Window"	North American Review	
1999	Frances Sherwood	"Basil the Dog"	Atlantic Monthly	
1999	Michael Swanwick	"Radiant Doors"	Asimov's Science Fiction	
1999	Michael Swanwick	"Ancient Engines"	Asimov's Science Fiction	
2000	Terry Bisson*	"Macs"	The Magazine of Fantasy & Science Fiction	
2000	Jeffrey Ford	"The Fantasy Writer's Assistant"	The Magazine of Fantasy & Science Fiction	
2000	Ellen Klages	"Flying Over Water"	Lady Churchill's Rosebud Wristlet	
2000	Severna Park	"The Golem"	Black Heart, Ivory Bones (Avon Books)	
2000	Michael Swanwick	"Scherzo with Tyrannosaur"	Asimov's Science Fiction	
2000	Pat York	"You Wandered Off Like a Foolish Child To Break Your Heart and Mine"	Silver Birch, Blood Moon (Avon Books)	
2001	Severna Park*	"The Cure for Everything"	Sci Fiction	
2001	Michael A. Burstein	"Kaddish for the Last Survivor"	Analog Science Fiction and Fact	
2001	Mike Resnick	"The Elephants on Neptune"	Asimov's Science Fiction	
2001	Sherwood Smith	"Mom and Dad at the Home Front"	Realms of Fantasy	
2001	George Zebrowski	"Wound the Wind"	Analog Science Fiction and Fact	
2002	Carol Emshwiller*	"Creature"	The Magazine of Fantasy & Science Fiction	
2002	Jeffrey Ford	"Creation"	The Magazine of Fantasy & Science Fiction	
2002	Megan Lindholm	"Cut"	Asimov's Science Fiction	
2002	Jack McDevitt	"Nothing Ever Happens in Rock City"	Artemis	
2002	Tim Pratt	"Little Gods"	Strange Horizons	
2002	Michael Swanwick	"The Dog Said Bow-Wow"	Asimov's Science Fiction	
2003	Karen Joy Fowler*	"What I Didn't See"	Sci Fiction	
2003	Eleanor Arnason	"Knapsack Poems"	Asimov's Science Fiction	
2003	Kevin Brockmeier	"The Brief History of the Dead"	Asimov's Science Fiction	
2003	Harlan Ellison	"Good-Bye to All That"	McSweeney's Mammoth Treasury of Thrilling Tales (Hamish Hamilton)	
2003	Carol Emshwiller	"Grandma"	The Magazine of Fantasy & Science Fiction	
2003	Molly Gloss	"Lambing Season"	Asimov's Science Fiction	
2003	James Van Pelt	"The Last of the O-Forms"	Asimov's Science Fiction	
2004	Eileen Gunn*	"Coming to Terms"	Stable Strategies and Others (Tachyon Publications)	
2004	Mike Moscoe	"The Strange Redemption of Sister Mary Ann"	Analog Science Fiction and Fact	
2004	Mike Resnick	"Travels with My Cats"	Asimov's Science Fiction	
2004	Benjamin Rosenbaum	"Embracing-The-New"	Asimov's Science Fiction	
2004	Greg van Eekhout	"In the Late December"	Strange Horizons	
2004	Ken Wharton	"Aloha"	Analog Science Fiction and Fact	
2005	Carol Emshwiller*	"I Live With You"	The Magazine of Fantasy & Science Fiction	
2005	K. D. Wentworth	"Born Again"	The Magazine of Fantasy & Science Fiction	
2005	Dale Bailey	"The End of the World as We Know It"	The Magazine of Fantasy & Science Fiction	
2005	Nancy Kress	"My Mother, Dancing"	Asimov's Science Fiction	
2005	Margo Lanagan	"Singing My Sister Down"	Black Juice (Allen & Unwin)	
2005	Anne Harris	"Still Life with Boobs"	Talebones	
2005	Richard Bowes	"There's a Hole in the City"	Sci Fiction	
2006	Elizabeth Hand*	"Echo"	The Magazine of Fantasy & Science Fiction	
2006	Esther Friesner	"Helen Remembers the Stork Club"	The Magazine of Fantasy & Science Fiction	
2006	Eugene Mirabelli	"The Woman in Schrodinger's Wave Equations"	The Magazine of Fantasy & Science Fiction	
2006	Jack McDevitt	"Henry James, This One's for You"	Subterranean Magazine	
2006	Karina Sumner-Smith	"An End to All Things"	Children of Magic (DAW Books)	
2006	Theodora Goss	"Pip and the Fairies"	Strange Horizons	
2007	Karen Joy Fowler*	"Always"	Asimov's Science Fiction	
2007	Andy Duncan	"Unique Chicken Goes In Reverse"	Eclipse 1 (Night Shade Books)	
2007	David D. Levine	"Titanium Mike Saves the Day"	The Magazine of Fantasy & Science Fiction	
2007	Vera Nazarian	"The Story of Love"	Salt of the Air (Prime Books)	
2007	Jennifer Pelland	"Captive Girl"	Helix SF	
2007	Mary Turzillo	"Pride"	Fast Forward 1: Future Fiction from the Cutting Edge (Pyr)	
2008	Nina Kiriki Hoffman*	"Trophy Wives"	Fellowship Fantastic (DAW Books)	
2008	Mike Allen	"The Button Bin"	Helix SF	
2008	Jeffrey Ford	"The Dreaming Wind"	The Coyote Road: Trickster Tales (Viking Press)	
2008	Kij Johnson	"26 Monkeys, Also the Abyss"	Asimov's Science Fiction	
2008	Gwyneth Jones	"The Tomb Wife"	The Magazine of Fantasy & Science Fiction	
2008	James Patrick Kelly	"Don't Stop"	Asimov's Science Fiction	
2008	Ruth Nestvold	"Mars: A Traveler's Guide"	The Magazine of Fantasy & Science Fiction	
2009	Kij Johnson*	"Spar"	Clarkesworld Magazine	
2009	Saladin Ahmed	"Hooves and the Hovel of Abdel Jameela"	Clockwork Phoenix 2 (Norilana Books)	
2009	Michael A. Burstein	"I Remember the Future"	I Remember the Future (Apex Publications)	
2009	N. K. Jemisin	"Non-Zero Probabilities"	Clarkesworld Magazine	
2009	James Patrick Kelly	"Going Deep"	Asimov's Science Fiction	
2009	Will McIntosh	"Bridesicle"	Asimov's Science Fiction	
2010	Harlan Ellison*	"How Interesting: A Tiny Man"	Realms of Fantasy	
2010	Kij Johnson*	"Ponies"	Tor.com	
2010	Adam-Troy Castro	"Arvies"	Lightspeed	
2010	Vylar Kaftan	"I'm Alive, I Love You, I'll See You in Reno"	Lightspeed	
2010	Amal El-Mohtar	"The Green Book"	Apex Magazine	
2010	Jennifer Pelland	"Ghosts of New York"	Dark Faith (Apex Publications)	
2010	Felicity Shoulders	"Conditional Love"	Asimov's Science Fiction	
2011	Ken Liu*	"The Paper Menagerie"	The Magazine of Fantasy & Science Fiction	
2011	Adam-Troy Castro	"Her Husband's Hands"	Lightspeed	
2011	Tom Crosshill	"Mama, We are Zhenya, Your Son"	Lightspeed	
2011	Nancy Fulda	"Movement"	Asimov's Science Fiction	
2011	Aliette de Bodard	"Shipbirth"	Asimov's Science Fiction	
2011	David W. Goldman	"The Axiom of Choice"	New Haven Review	
2011	E. Lily Yu	"The Cartographer Wasps and the Anarchist Bees"	Clarkesworld Magazine	
2012	Aliette de Bodard*	"Immersion"	Clarkesworld Magazine	
2012	Helena Bell	"Robot"	Clarkesworld Magazine	
2012	Tom Crosshill	"Fragmentation, or Ten Thousand Goodbyes"	Clarkesworld Magazine	
2012	Leah Cypess	"Nanny's Day"	Asimov's Science Fiction	
2012	Maria Dahvana Headley	"Give Her Honey When You Hear Her Scream"	Lightspeed	
2012	Ken Liu	"The Bookmaking Habits of Select Species"	Lightspeed	
2012	Cat Rambo	"Five Ways to Fall in Love on Planet Porcelain"	Near + Far (Hydra House)	
2013	Rachel Swirsky*	"If You Were a Dinosaur, My Love"	Apex Magazine	
2013	Matthew Kressel	"The Sounds of Old Earth"	Lightspeed	
2013	Sofia Samatar	"Selkie Stories Are for Losers"	Strange Horizons	
2013	Kenneth Schneyer	"Selected Program Notes from the Retrospective Exhibition of Theresa Rosenberg Latimer"	Clockwork Phoenix 4 (Mythic Delirium Books)	
2013	Sylvia Spruck Wrigley	"Alive, Alive Oh"	Lightspeed	
2014	Ursula Vernon*	"Jackalope Wives"	Apex Magazine	
2014	Aliette de Bodard	"The Breath of War"	Beneath Ceaseless Skies	
2014	Eugie Foster	"When It Ends, He Catches Her"	Daily Science Fiction	
2014	Matthew Kressel	"The Meeker and the All-Seeing Eye"	Clarkesworld Magazine	
2014	Usman T. Malik	"The Vaporization Enthalpy of a Peculiar Pakistani Family"	Qualia Nous (Written Backwards)	
2014	Sarah Pinsker	"A Stretch of Highway Two Lanes Wide"	The Magazine of Fantasy & Science Fiction	
2014	Alyssa Wong	"The Fisher Queen"	The Magazine of Fantasy & Science Fiction	
2015	Alyssa Wong*	"Hungry Daughters of Starving Mothers"	Nightmare Magazine	
2015	Naomi Kritzer	"Cat Pictures Please"	Clarkesworld Magazine	
2015	David D. Levine	"Damage"	Tor.com	
2015	Amal El-Mohtar	"Madeleine"	Lightspeed	
2015	Martin L. Shoemaker	"Today I Am Paul"	Clarkesworld Magazine	
2015	Sam J. Miller	"When Your Child Strays from God"	Clarkesworld Magazine	
2016	Amal El-Mohtar*	"Seasons of Glass and Iron"	The Starlit Wood (Saga Press)	
2016	Brooke Bolander	"Our Talons Can Crush Galaxies"	Uncanny Magazine	
2016	Barbara Krasnoff	"Sabbath Wine"	Clockwork Phoenix 5 (Mythic Delirium Books)	
2016	Sam J. Miller	"Things With Beards"	Clarkesworld Magazine	
2016	A. Merc Rustad	"This Is Not a Wardrobe Door"	Fireside Magazine	
2016	Alyssa Wong	"A Fist of Permutations in Lightning and Wildflowers"	Tor.com	
2016	Caroline M. Yoachim	"Welcome to the Medical Clinic at the Interplanetary Relay Station │ Hours Since the Last Patient Death: 0"	Lightspeed	
2017	Rebecca Roanhorse*	"Welcome to Your Authentic Indian Experience™"	Apex Magazine	
2017	Vina Jie-Min Prasad	"Fandom for Robots"	Uncanny Magazine	
2017	Jamie Wahls	"Utopia, LOL?"	Strange Horizons	
2017	Fran Wilde	"Clearly Lettered in a Mostly Steady Hand"	Uncanny Magazine	
2017	Matthew Kressel	"The Last Novelist (or A Dead Lizard in the Yard)"	Tor.com	
2017	Caroline M. Yoachim	"Carnival Nine"	Beneath Ceaseless Skies	
2018	Phenderson Djèlí Clark*	"The Secret Lives of the Nine Negro Teeth of George Washington"	Fireside Magazine	
2018	A. T. Greenblatt	"And Yet"	Uncanny Magazine	
2018	Sarah Pinsker	"The Court Magician"	Lightspeed	
2018	Richard Fox	"Going Dark"	Backblast Area Clear (Ellen Campbell)	
2018	Rhett C. Bruno	"Interview for the End of the World"	Bridge Across the Stars (Sci-Fi Bridge)	
2018	Alix E. Harrow	"A Witch's Guide to Escape: A Practical Compendium of Portal Fantasies"	Apex Magazine	
2019	A. T. Greenblatt*	"Give the Family My Love"	Clarkesworld Magazine	
2019	Karen Osborne	"The Dead, In Their Uncontrollable Power"	Uncanny Magazine	
2019	Shiv Ramdas	"And Now His Lordship Is Laughing"	Strange Horizons	
2019	Nibedita Sen	"Ten Excerpts from an Annotated Bibliography on the Cannibal Women of Ratnabar Island"	Nightmare Magazine	
2019	Fran Wilde	"A Catalog of Storms"	Uncanny Magazine	
2019	A. C. Wise	"How the Trick Is Done"	Uncanny Magazine	
2020	John Wiswell*	"Open House on Haunted Hill"	Diabolical Plots	
2020	Rae Carson	"Badass Moms in the Zombie Apocalypse"	Uncanny Magazine	
2020	Aimee Picchi	"Advanced Word Problems in Portal Math"	Daily Science Fiction	
2020	Vina Jie-Min Prasad	"A Guide for Working Breeds"	Made to Order: Robots and Revolution (Solaris Books)	
2020	Jason Sanford	"The Eight-Thousanders"	Asimov's Science Fiction	
2020	Eugenia Triantafyllou	"My Country Is a Ghost"	Uncanny Magazine	
2021	Sarah Pinsker*	"Where Oaken Hearts Do Gather"	Uncanny Magazine	
2021	Alix E. Harrow	"Mr. Death"	Apex Magazine	
2021	José Pablo Iriarte	"Proof by Induction"	Uncanny Magazine	
2021	Sam J. Miller	"Let All the Children Boogie"	Tor.com	
2021	Suzan Palumbo	"Laughter Among the Trees"	The Dark	
2021	John Wiswell	"For Lack of a Bed"	Diabolical Plots	
2022	Samantha Mills*	"Rabbit Test"	Uncanny Magazine	
2022	John Wiswell	"D.I.Y."	Tor.com	
2022	Oghenechovwe Donald Ekpeki	"Destiny Delayed"	Asimov's Science Fiction	
2022	Ian Muneshwar	"Dick Pig"	Nightmare Magazine	
2022	Suzan Palumbo	"Douen"	The Dark	
2022	Ai Jiang	"Give Me English"	The Magazine of Fantasy & Science Fiction	
2023	R. S. A. Garcia*	"Tantie Merle and the Farmhand 4200"	Uncanny Magazine	
2023	P. A. Cornell	"Once Upon a Time at The Oakmont"	Fantasy	
2023	Thomas Ha	"Window Boy"	Clarkesworld Magazine	
2023	Rachael K. Jones	"The Sound of Children Screaming"	Nightmare Magazine	
2023	Naomi Kritzer	"Better Living Through Algorithms"	Clarkesworld Magazine	
2023	John Wiswell	"Bad Doors"	Uncanny Magazine	
2024	Isabel J. Kim	"Why Don't We Just Kill the Kid In the Omelas Hole"	Clarkesworld Magazine	
2024	Jordan Kurella	"Evan: A Remainder"	Reactor	
2024	Rachael K. Jones	"Five Views of the Planet Tartarus"	Lightspeed	
2024	PH Lee	"The V*mpire"	Reactor	
2024	Caroline M. Yoachim	"We Will Teach You How to Read | We Will Teach You How to Read"	Lightspeed	
2024	Jennifer Hudak	"The Witch Trap"	Lady Churchill's Rosebud Wristlet	
2025	Effie Seiberg*	"Laser Eyes Ain't Everything"	Diabolical Plots	
2025	P. A. Cornell	"Through the Machine"	Lightspeed	
2025	J. R. Dawson	"Six People to Revise You"	Uncanny Magazine	
2025	Thomas Ha	"In My Country"	Clarkesworld Magazine	
2025	E. M. Linden	"The Tawlish Island Songbook of the Dead"	PodCastle	
2025	Aimee Ogden	"Because I Held His Name Like a Key"	Strange Horizons	

== See also ==
- Hugo Award for Best Short Story
