= Vylar Kaftan =

American speculative fiction writer

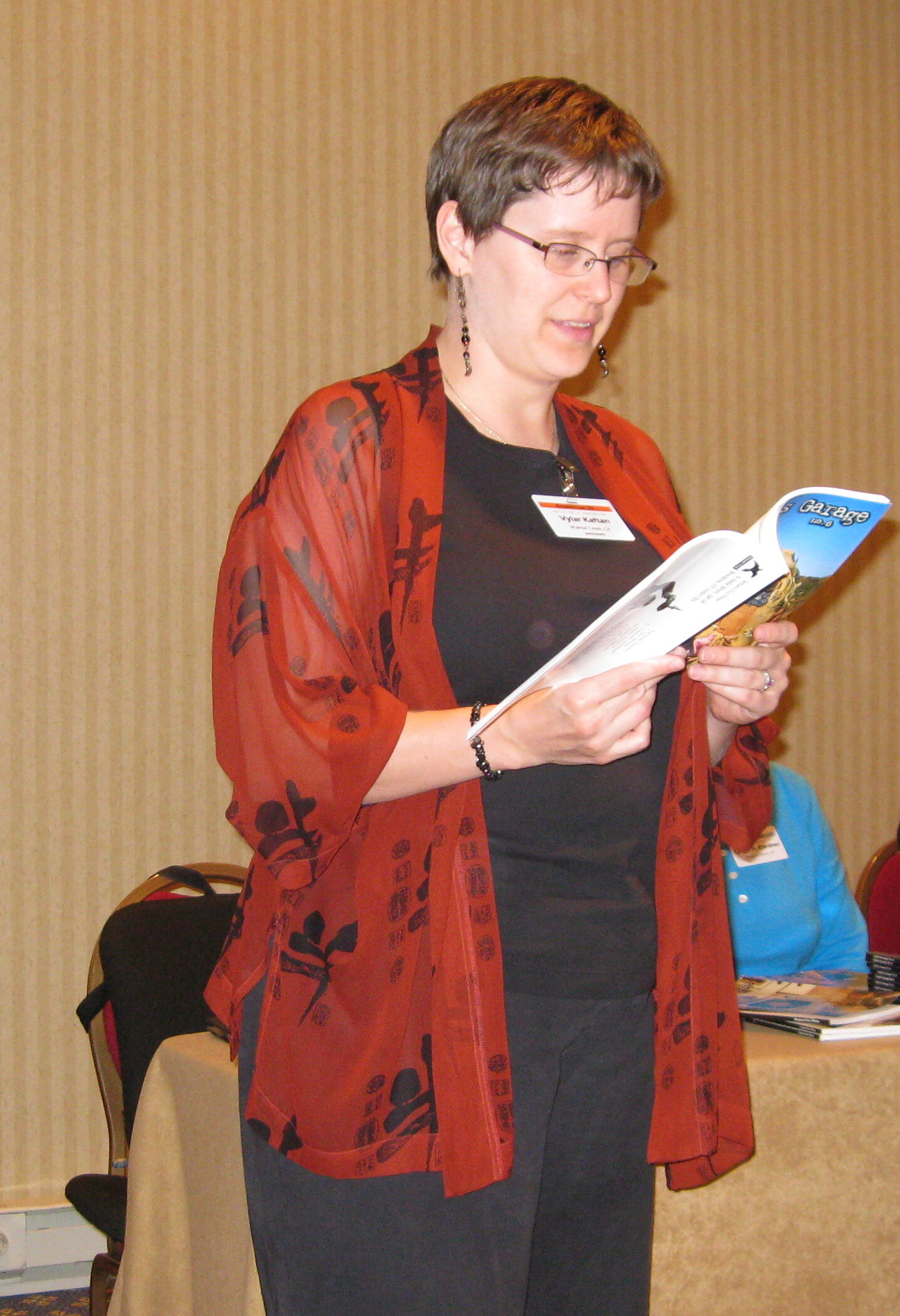
Vylar Kaftan reads at Readercon, 2009

Vylar Kaftan is an American science fiction and fantasy writer. A Clarion West Writers Workshop graduate, she lives on the U.S. West Coast.

Kaftan's short story "Civilisation" is included in Farah Mendlesohn's anthology Glorifying Terrorism, and several of her other speculative fiction flash and short stories have also been published. Her short story "I'm Alive, I Love You, I'll See You in Reno", published in the June 2010 issue of Lightspeed, was a nominee for the Nebula Award for Best Short Story in 2010.

Her novella "The Weight of the Sunrise", published in the February 2013 issue of Asimov's Science Fiction, won the 2013 Nebula Award for Best Novella and the Sidewise Award.; it also was a nominee for the 2014 Theodore Sturgeon Award. Her novella "Her Silhouette, Drawn in Water", published May 21, 2019 by Tor.com, was a nominee for the Nebula Award for Best Novella.

== Bibliography ==
See also the list of stories on her website, with links.

=== Short fiction ===
Year	Title	First published	Reprinted/collected	Notes
2010	"I'm Alive, I Love You, I'll See You in Reno"	Kaftan, Vylar (June 2010). "I'm Alive, I Love You, I'll See You in Reno". Lightspeed.		
2012	"Lion Dance"	Kaftan, Vylar (October–November 2012). "Lion Dance". Asimov's Science Fiction. Vol. 36, no. 10–11.		
2013	"The Weight of the Sunrise"	Kaftan, Vylar (February 2013). "The Weight of the Sunrise". Asimov's Science Fiction. Vol. 37, no. 2. pp. 76–106.		Novella
2019	"Her Silhouette, Drawn in Water"	Kaftan, Vylar (May 21, 2019). "Her Silhouette, Drawn in Water". Tor.com. p. 112.		Novella
