= The Law and the Heart =

2014 collection of short stories by Kenneth Schneyer

The Law & the Heart: Stories to Bend the Mind & Soul
- Cover of first edition
- Author: Kenneth Schneyer
- Language: English
- Genre: science fiction
- Publisher: Stillpoint/Prometheus
- Publication date: 2014
- Publication place: United States
- Media type: print (paperback), ebook
- Pages: 204
- ISBN: 978-1-938808-22-7

The Law & the Heart: Stories to Bend the Mind & Soul is a collection of science fiction short stories by American writer Kenneth Schneyer. It was first published by Stillpoint/Prometheus in paperback and ebook in May 2014.

== Summary ==
The book collects thirteen short works of fiction by the author, together with a foreword by Liz Argall.

== Contents ==
- "Foreword" (Liz Argall)
- I - The Law
  - "Conflagration" (from Newport Review, Summer 2010)
  - "I Have Read the Terms of Use" (from Daily Science Fiction, December 3, 2013)
  - "Grapple with Thee" (with Gareth D. Jones) (first publication)
  - "Half a Degree" (first publication)
  - "The Whole Truth Witness" (from Analog Science Fiction & Fact, October 2010)
  - "Exceptionalism" (first publication)
  - "Life of the Author Plus Seventy" (from Analog Science Fiction & Fact, September 2013)
- II - The Heart
  - "Liza's Home" (from GUD: Greatest Uncommon Denominator, Winter 2009)
  - "The Orpheus Fountain" (first publication)
  - "Keeping Tabs" (from Abyss & Apex, 4th quarter, 2011)
  - "Hear the Enemy, My Daughter" (from Strange Horizons, May 6, 2013)
- III - The Law & the Heart
  - "The Tortoise Parliament" (from First Contact: Digital Science Fiction Anthology I, June 2011)
  - "Tenure Track" (from Cosmos Online, November 23, 2010)
- "About the Author"
