= Jennifer Pelland =

American novelist

Jennifer Pelland is an American writer of science fiction, principally short fiction.

Pelland's works have been characterized as "dark fiction with a thread of humanity running through it", focusing on themes of body modification and destruction. Her short stories Captive Girl (2007) and Ghosts of New York (2010) were nominated for the Nebula Award for Best Short Story. Captive Girl was also shortlisted for the Gaylactic Spectrum Awards.

Pelland is married. She lives near Boston, practices belly dancing, and is a part-time voice-actor.

== Works ==
In addition to numerous pieces of short fiction, Pelland has written:

- Unwelcome Bodies (2008, ISBN 978-0978867676), a short story collection
- Machine (2012, ISBN 978-1937009137), a novel
