= Idiot's Mate =

"Idiot's Mate" is a 1968 science fiction short story by Robert Taylor. It was first published in Amazing Stories.

== Synopsis ==
A chess tournament is held on the Moon — but instead of pieces, the game uses people in spacesuits, who wield guns with explosive bullets.

== Reception ==
"Idiot's Mate" was a finalist for the Nebula Award for Best Short Story of 1968.

Galactic Journey found it to be "a bit overwritten, but capably so," and noted that it "moves fast".

Mike Ashley has assessed it as "almost certainly" the most popular story published in Amazing Stories under the editorial tenure of Harry Harrison.
