= Karina Fabian =

American novelist

- Born: Karina Lumbert; 1967 (age 58–59)
- Education: Colorado State University
- Occupation: Writer
- Spouse: Robert Fabian
- Parents: Steven Lumbert (father); Socorro Lumbert (mother)
- Writing career
- Genres: Fantasy; science fiction; comedic horror
- Website: www.karinafabian.com

Karina Fabian (born 1967) is a Catholic American writer of fantasy, science fiction, comedic horror, and devotionals. She is one of the founders of the Catholic Writers' Guild.

She is known for her involvement in writing communities, including founding the Catholic Writers Conference Online and teaching at various free workshops, such as the MuseOnline Conference. She promotes Catholic writing through the Guild, an international online organization of Catholic writers, editors and illustrators.

== Early life ==
Karina (Lumbert) Fabian was born to Steven Lumbert, a Colorado State Patrolman, and Socorro Lumbert, a social worker for the developmentally disabled. She grew up in Pueblo, Colorado, and graduated Valedictorian from South High School in 1985.

She then attended Colorado State University in Fort Collins, Colorado, on a four-year Air Force Scholarship, where she majored in Math and minored in History. She graduated with university honors and received a commission in the US Air Force. Her first assignment was to Signals Intelligence Training in San Angelo, Texas, where she met her future husband, Robert Fabian, a first lieutenant at El Dorado Missile Warning station.

Fabian began her writing career in earnest in the summer of 1995, taking on writing jobs with the Diocese of Wyoming, and working freelance for nonfiction magazines. She primarily freelanced, writing about pregnancy, parenting, and homeschooling until 2007 when she shifted her focus to writing fiction.

== Career ==
=== Genres ===
Karina Fabian writes in several genres, including Christian devotionals and satirical horror. She enjoys mixing established religion and faith with fantasy and science fiction, as part of being a character-driven writer. She has stated that religion is a part of the human condition and thus should be a natural part of a character's life and thus, a part of fiction. She has criticized books that put preaching above plot and character.

In 2010, Fabian was given the opportunity to write a small devotional. She invited her father, Deacon Steven Lumbert, to write it with her. Why God Matters: How to Recognize Him in Daily Life contains short stories from their own faith lives, plus suggestions for contemplation and prayer, Bible quotes and the Catechism of the Catholic Church.

=== Founder of the Catholic Writers' Guild ===
Fabian is one of the founding members of the Catholic Writers' Guild, an American-based but international organization of Catholic writers, editors and illustrators, officially established in 2009. She served as president for the first four of its founding years, then as an officer.

She worked with author Ann Lewis to create online and live writers conferences, sponsored by the Guild. The online conference, which takes place each Spring, offers workshops and talks on writing and faith, as well as pitch sessions. The Guild also has programs for evaluating the Catholic content of books (The CWG Seal of Approval) and for excellence in Catholic Writing (the Catholic Arts and Letters Award).

== Awards ==
Karina Fabian has won several awards for her work:

- 2007 EPPIE Finalist (best anthology): Leaps of Faith
- 2009 EPPIE Winner (best science fiction): Infinite Space, Infinite God
- 2009 Mensa International Owl (best fiction): World Gathering: Magic, Mensa and Mayhem
- 2010 Next Generation Indie Book Awards Winner (best fantasy): Magic, Mensa and Mayhem
- 2011 Global eBook award for Best Horror; Neeta Lyffe, Zombie Exterminator
- 2012 eFestival of Words Best of the Independent eBook Awards, runner-up (best fantasy/urban fantasy): Mind Over Mind; runner-up (best young adult): Neeta Lyffe: Zombie Exterminator

== Bibliography ==
- Mind Over series (4 novels, as at 2023)
- DragonEye P.I. series (10 novels, as at 2023)
- Space Traipse series (6 novels, as at 2023)
- Dex Holister series (2 novels, as at 2023)
- Neeta Lyffe series (3 novels, as at 2023)
- Rescue Sisters series (6 books, as at 2023)
- Infinite Space, Infinite God I and II (2007 and 2010, Twilight Times)
- Leaps of Faith (2008, The Writers' Café Press)
- Why God Matters: How to Recognize Him in Daily Life (2010, Tribute Books)
- A Little Flower's Craft Companion Wreath I and A Little Flower's Craft Companion Wreath II and III, and the Blue Knights Craft Companion (EcceHomo Press)
- Etiquette with Your Robot Husband (poetry) (2004) with Robert Fabian (Dell Publications)

Fabian has also written short fiction and anthologies.
