= Will McIntosh =

American novelist (born 1962)

- Born: William D. McIntosh; January 31, 1962 (age 64); New York City, U.S.
- Education: University of Georgia (PhD)
- Occupations: Author, social psychologist
- Writing career
- Genre: Science fiction

Will McIntosh (William D. McIntosh, born January 31, 1962 in New York City) is a science fiction and young adult author, a Hugo-Award-winner, and a winner or finalist for many other awards. Along with eleven novels, including Defender (novel)|Defenders, Love Minus Eighty, and Burning Midnight, he has published dozens of short stories in magazines such as Asimov's Science Fiction, Strange Horizons, Lightspeed Magazine, Clarkesworld, and Interzone. His stories are frequently reprinted in different "Year's Best" anthologies.

== Life ==
McIntosh attended the University of Georgia, where he received a Ph.D. in social psychology in 1990. He was a professor at Georgia Southern, where he taught psychology classes. His research focused on topics such as internet dating and romantic relationships, "happiness and goals, collecting behavior, psychological aspects of film and television, and the relationship between psychology and Zen Buddhism." In 2012, McIntosh moved to the College of William and Mary to teach introductory psychology classes and focus on his writing.

== Writing ==
McIntosh attended the Clarion Workshop in 2003, and the Taos Toolbox workshop in 2008. McIntosh's short story "Soft Apocalypse" was shortlisted for both the British Science Fiction Award and the British Fantasy Award. His story "Bridesicle" won both the 2010 Hugo Award for Best Short Story and the 2010 Asimov's Reader Poll, along with being a finalist for that year's Nebula Award, while his story "Over There" won the 2014 Asimov's Reader Poll, and was a finalist for the Theodore Sturgeon Memorial Award in 2014.

His short story "Followed" was adapted into a film by director James Kicklighter in 2011.

Translations of McIntosh's novels have been published in China, Russia, Spain, France, Germany, Italy, Belgium, Taiwan, and Hungary.

== Bibliography ==
=== Novels ===
- Soft Apocalypse. Night Shade Books. 2011.
- Hitchers. Night Shade Books. 2012.
- Love Minus Eighty Orbit Books, June 2013
- Defenders Orbit Books, May 2014
- Faller Tor Books, October 2016
- Wild, June 2023

=== Young adult novels ===
- Burning Midnight Delacorte Press, March 2016
- Unbreakable Character Force, June 2017
- The Future Will Be BS Free Delacorte Press, July 2018

=== Middle grade novels ===
- Watchdog Delacorte Press, October 2017
- The Classmate Future House Publishing, March 2022

=== Short fiction ===
Stories (Note: Short stories unless otherwise noted.)

- "Under the Boardwalk", Andromeda Spaceways Inflight Magazine, Issue 19, 2005
- "Soft Apocalypse", Interzone, Sept/Oct 2005 (Note: Finalist for the 2005 British Science Fiction Award and the 2005 British Fantasy Award; Reprinted in Galaxies (France).)
- "Totems", Interzone, Jan/Feb 2005
- "New Spectacles", Abyss & Apex (Note: Reprinted in The Best of Abyss & Apex.)
- "Friction", Albedo One, Issue 30
- "Best Friend", ChiZine, Jan-March 2006
- "Followed", Lady Churchill's Rosebud Wristlet, June, 2006 (Note: Reprinted in The Living Dead, John Joseph Adams, editor, 2008.)
- "The Last Cyberpunk", Andromeda Spaceways Inflight Magazine, Issue 22, 2006
- "The New Chinese Wives", Interzone, Sept/Oct 2006
- "Perfect Violet", On Spec, Summer, 2007 (Note: Reprinted in Science Fiction: Best of the Year 2008.)
- "Three Unlikely Futures", Postscripts, Autumn, 2007
- "Dada Jihad", Interzone, Sept/Oct 2007
- "One Paper Airplane Graffito Love Note", Strange Horizons, Oct. 2007
- "Unlikely", Asimov's Science Fiction, Jan. 2008 (Note: Reprinted in New Horizons #1, Isli (Russian), Sci Fi Magazin,(Romania), Galaxies, (France).)
- "The Fantasy Jumper", Black Static, Feb., 2008 (Note: Reprinted in Science Fiction: Best of the Year 2009.)
- "Linkworlds", Strange Horizons, March 2008 (Note: Reprinted in Unplugged: The Year's Best Online Fiction, 2009.)
- "Street Hero", Interzone, Mar/April 2008
- "A Clown Escapes from Circus Town", Interzone, Mar/April 2009
- "Midnight Blue", Asimov's Science Fiction, Sept. 2008 (Note: Reprinted in Russian in Isli.)
- "None Had Sharp Teeth", Black Static, 2009
- "Bridesicle", Asimov's Science Fiction, Jan. 2009 (Note: Winner of the 2010 Hugo Award for Best Short Story; winner of the 2010 Asimov's Reader Poll; finalist for the 2010 Nebula Award for Best Short Story.)
- "Frankenstein, Frankenstein", Asimov's Science Fiction, Oct./Nov. 2010
- "Defenders", Lightspeed Magazine, August 2011
- "Possible Monsters", Asimov's Science Fiction, July 2012
- "Over There", Asimov's Science Fiction, January 2013 (Note: Finalist, Theodore Sturgeon Memorial Award, 2014.)
- "Dry Bite", Lightspeed Magazine, Sept. 2013
- "The Savannah Liars Tour", Lightspeed Magazine, Jan. 2016
- "Lost: Mind", Asimov's Science Fiction, July 2016
- "Soulmates.com", Asimov's Science Fiction, March/April 2017 (Note: Reprinted in The Year’s Best Science Fiction and Fantasy, 2018.)
- "What Is Eve?", Lightspeed Magazine, April 2018
- "Foot Ball", Future SF, Aug. 2019
- "Nic and Viv's Compulsory Courtship", Asimov's Science Fiction, July/Aug. 2020
- "Philly Killed His Car", Asimov's Science Fiction, July/Aug. 2021
- "Mom Heart", Clarkesworld Magazine, November, 2021
- "Dollbot Cicily", Asimov's Science Fiction, March/April 2022
- "Work Minus Eighty", Asimov's Science Fiction, July/August 2022

Title	Year	First published	Reprinted/collected	Notes
Over there	2013	McIntosh, Will (January 2013). "Over there". Asimov's Science Fiction. 37 (1): 32–49.		
Scout	2014	McIntosh, Will (April–May 2014). "Scout". Asimov's Science Fiction. 38 (4&5): 53–61.		
A thousand nights till morning	2015	McIntosh, Will (August 2015). "A thousand nights till morning". Asimov's Science Fiction. 39 (8): 64–105.		Novella

———————

Bibliography notes
