= The Weight of the Sunrise =

2013 novella by Vylar Kaftan

"The Weight of the Sunrise" is a 2013 alternate history short story by Vylar Kaftan. It was first published in Asimov's Science Fiction in February 2013.

== Synopsis ==
When Francisco Pizarro and the Conquistadors arrived in Peru, Atahualpa and his troops slaughtered them. The Inca Empire thrives, but is beset by smallpox. Centuries later, emissaries arrive from the Thirteen Colonies, seeking to trade the secret of vaccination for gold.

== Reception ==
"The Weight of the Sunrise" won the Nebula Award for Best Novella of 2013, and the Sidewise Award for Alternate History, short form, for 2013.

Tangent Online considered it "mesmerizing and beautifully told", and noted its "overall tone (...) of pride and hope."
