= Selected Program Notes from the Retrospective Exhibition of Theresa Rosenberg Latimer =

"Selected Program Notes from the Retrospective Exhibition of Theresa Rosenberg Latimer" is a 2013 fantasy story by Kenneth Schneyer. It was first published in the Mythic Delirium Books anthology Clockwork Phoenix 4. An audio version was subsequently released on PodCastle, read by Peter Wood.

== Plot summary ==
Rather than being a conventional narrative, "Selected Program Notes from the Retrospective Exhibition of Theresa Rosenberg Latimer" is presented as a set of notes and discussion questions from an art museum's posthumous exhibition of the paintings of Theresa Rosenberg Latimer — a woman who was able to see things that other people were not. Schneyer has stated that the story is about ghosts, and that the narrator is intended to be a "curator who (...) entirely misunderstand(s) the story that was being told by the paintings."

== Reception ==
"Selected Program Notes from the Retrospective Exhibition of Theresa Rosenberg Latimer" was a finalist for the Nebula Award for Best Short Story of 2013, and the 2014 Theodore Sturgeon Memorial Award. Tangent Online praised the level of detail with which Schneyer described Latimer's paintings, while at Locus, Lois Tilton called the story a "puzzle" with "a lot of clues", stating that it "rewards re-reading". Tor.com noted that although "these sorts of stories" (i.e., stories where the narrative is presented as a series of disconnected facts which readers must mentally assemble) are often "so boring that [readers] don’t make it to the end," Selected is "far more successful than most"; Strange Horizons, however, considered that despite the story being "effective" and "very technically ambitious", its weakness was its presentism: although Latimer is portrayed as having lived until 2025, and therefore the art exhibition must take place after that, the "program notes purportedly written in the future feel as though they were written in [2013], as they in fact were."
