= David D. Levine =

American science fiction writer

- Levine at World Fantasy Convention 2026
- Born: February 21, 1961 (age 65); Minneapolis, Minnesota
- Occupation: Writer
- Spouse: Kate Yule (d. 2016)
- Writing career
- Genre: Science-fiction
- Notable works: Wavefronts of history and memory, Tk'tk'tk, Teaching the Pig to Sing, Arabella of Mars
- Notable awards: Hugo Award for Best Short Story

David D. Levine (born February 21, 1961, in Minneapolis, Minnesota) is an American science fiction writer who won the Hugo Award for Best Short Story in 2006 for his story "Tk'tk'tk". His novel Arabella of Mars was published by Tor Books in July 2016 and won the Andre Norton Award for Young Adult Science Fiction and Fantasy.

== Biography ==
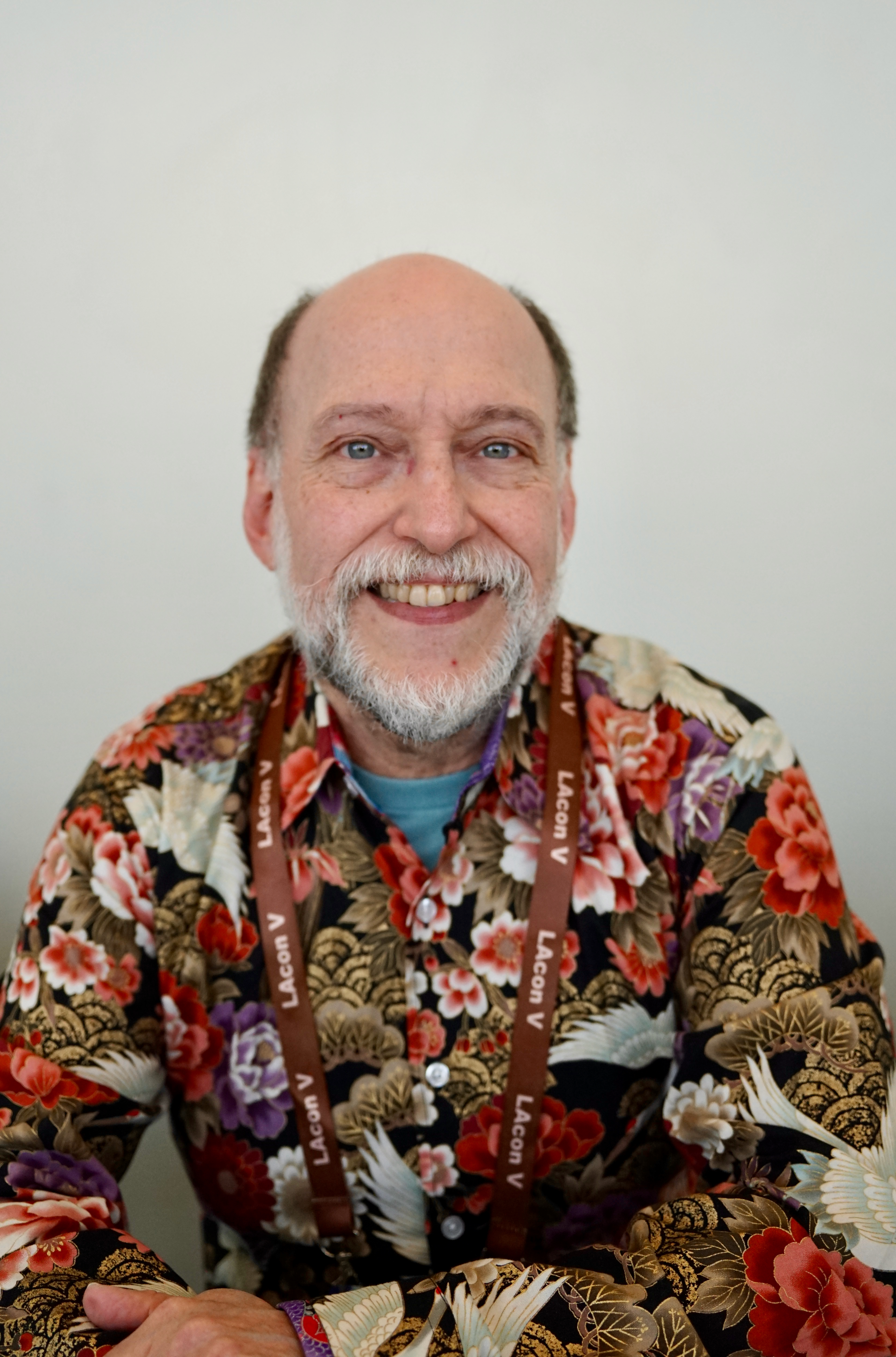
Levine at Worldcon 2026

Although Levine has a long interest in reading and writing science fiction, he began as a writer of technical articles. He has primarily written short fiction; his first professional fiction sale came in 2001. A long-time member of science fiction fandom and early member of MilwApa (the Milwaukee amateur press association), he also co-edited a fanzine, Bento, with his late wife, Kate Yule, and has served as Convention Committee Chair for Potlatch. His short story "Ukaliq and the Great Hunt" appeared in The Phobos Science Fiction Anthology Volume 2 (2003).

Although he grew up in Milwaukee, Wisconsin, Levine now lives in Portland, Oregon.

In 2010, he spent two weeks in a simulated Mars habitat of the Mars Society, in Utah.

== Bibliography ==
=== Novels ===
- Arabella of Mars (Tor Books, 2016), ISBN 978-0765382818
- Arabella and the Battle of Venus (Tor Books, 2017) ISBN 978-0765382825
- Arabella the Traitor of Mars (Tor Books, 2018) ISBN 978-0765382832

=== Wild Cards anthology ===
- Wild Cards I: Wild Cards – The 2010 Tor Books reprint contains the short story "Powers" that was not in the original 1987 Bantam Books release.

=== Short fiction ===
Collections

- Space Magic (Wheatland Press, 2008), ISBN 0-9794054-3-2 – Winner of 2009 Endeavor Award for best science fiction book in the Pacific Northwest

Stories

Title	Year	First published	Reprinted/collected	Notes
Wavefronts of History and Memory	2013	Analog 133/6 (Jun 2013)		
Tk'tk'tk	2005	Asimov's Science Fiction		
Teaching the Pig to Sing	2010	Analog 130/5 (May 2010)		
Pupa	2010	Analog 130/9 (Sep 2010)		
Letter to the Editor	2013	The Mad Scientist's Guide to World Domination		
The Wreck of the Mars Adventure	2013	Old Mars (2013)		
Damage	2015	Tor.com	The Best Science Fiction of the Year, Vol. 1 (2016, Night Shade)	
Command and Control	2017	Infinity Wars (2017)		
Malf	2015	Mission: Tomorrow (2015)		
River of Ice	2015	SF Comet		
Mammals	2014	Levine, David D. (December 2014). "Mammals". Analog Science Fiction and Fact. 134 (12): 58–62.	StarShipSofa	
Goat Eyes	2014	Black Static 42 (October 2014)		
A Practical Mechanism for Overcoming the Directionality of Temporal Flow	2014	HELP FUND MY ROBOT ARMY!!! and Other Improbable Crowdfunding Projects (2014)		
The White Raven's Feather	2012	Daily Science Fiction (March 2012)	Spells: Ten Tales of Magic (2012, Scimitar Press)	
The Last Days of the Kelly Gang	2012	Armored (March 2012)	Journey Into... 52 (November 2012)	
Into the Nth Dimension	2011	Human for a Day (December 2011)	GlitterShip (February 2016)	
The Tides of the Heart	2011	Realms of Fantasy (June 2011)	Heiresses of Russ 2012 (2012, Lethe Press)	
The Bucket Shop Job	2023	The Magazine of Fantasy & Science Fiction (January 2023)		

=== Essays and reporting ===
- "How the Future Predicts Science Fiction". The Internet Review of Science Fiction. VII (2). February 2010. Archived from the original on 4 May 2018.

== Awards ==
Andre Norton Award for Young Adult Science Fiction and Fantasy

- Arabella of Mars (2016)

Hugo Awards

- "Tk'Tk'Tk". Asimov's Science Fiction. March 2005.

James White Award

- "Nucleon". Interzone. 2001.

Endeavour Award

- Space Magic (Distinguished Novel or Collection, 2009)
