= Nebula Awards 26 =

1992 anthology edited by James Morrow

- Cover of first edition
- Editor: James Morrow
- Cover artist: Patrik Ryane
- Language: English
- Series: Nebula Awards
- Genre: Science fiction
- Publisher: Harcourt Brace Jovanovich
- Publication date: 1992
- Publication place: United States
- Media type: Print (hardcover)
- Pages: xv, 332
- ISBN: 978-0-15-164934-1
- OCLC: 25899170
- Dewey Decimal: 813.54
- LC Class: PS648.S3 N384 1992a
- Preceded by: Nebula Awards 25
- Followed by: Nebula Awards 27

Nebula Awards 26 is an anthology of science fiction short works edited by James Morrow, the first of three successive volumes published under his editorship. It was first published in hardcover and trade paperback by Harcourt Brace Jovanovich in May 1992.

== Summary ==
The book collects pieces that won or were nominated for the Nebula Awards for novella, novelette and short story for the year 1991, various nonfiction pieces related to the awards, and tributes to recently deceased editor Donald A. Wollheim and 1991 Grand Master award winner Lester del Rey, together with the two Rhysling Award-winning poems for 1990 and an introduction by the editor. Not all nominees for the various awards are included.

== Contents ==
- "Introduction" (James Morrow)
- "'Democrazy,' the Marketplace, and the American Way: Remarks on the Year 1990 in Science Fiction" [essay] (Kathryn Cramer)
- "The Shobies' Story" [Best Novelette nominee, 1991] (Ursula K. Le Guin)
- "Bears Discover Fire" [Best Short Story winner, 1991] (Terry Bisson)
- "Tower of Babylon" [Best Novelette winner, 1991] (Ted Chiang)
- "In Memoriam: Donald A. Wollheim" [essay] (George Zebrowski)
- "A Tribute to Lester del Rey" [essay] (Terry Brooks)
- "Love and Sex Among the Invertebrates" [Best Short Story nominee, 1991] (Pat Murphy)
- "1/72nd Scale" [Best Novelette nominee, 1991] (Ian R. MacLeod)
- "Lieserl" [Best Short Story nominee, 1991] (Karen Joy Fowler)
- "Epitaph for Dreams" [Rhysling Award, Best Short Poem winner, 1990] (G. Sutton Breiding)
- "Dear Spacemen" [Rhysling Award, Best Long Poem winner, 1990] (Patrick McKinnon)
- "Science Fiction Movies of 1990: Spiders, Scissors, and Schwarzenegger" [essay] (Bill Warren)
- "Over the Long Haul" [Best Novelette nominee, 1991] (Martha Soukup)
- "The Coon Rolled Down and Ruptured His Larinks, A Squeezed Novel by Mr. Skunk" [Best Novelette nominee, 1991] (Dafydd ab Hugh)
- "The Hemingway Hoax" [Best Novella winner, 1991] (Joe Haldeman)
- "About the Nebula Awards"
- "Selected Titles from the 1990 Preliminary Nebula Ballot"
- "Past Nebula Award Winners"

== Reception ==
Kirkus Reviews noted that "[p]revious high standards [are] maintained" in this volume, with "plenty of varied, absorbing fiction," with "[m]ost of [it] already quite famous"–citing the contributions of Le Guin, Bisson, Chiang, Murphy and Haldeman. Cramer's overview of 1990 SF was called "useful" and Warren's piece on the year's films "best of all, ... splendid, cleareyed ... the nonfictional benchmark."

The anthology was also reviewed by Gary K. Wolfe in Locus no. 376, May 1992, and Tom Easton in Analog Science Fiction and Fact, December 1992.

== Awards ==
The book placed ninth in the 1993 Locus Poll Award for Best Anthology.
