= Nebula Awards 25 =

1991 anthology edited by Michael Bishop

- Cover of first edition
- Author: edited by Michael Bishop
- Cover artist: Vaughn Andrews
- Language: English
- Series: Nebula Awards
- Genre: Science fiction short stories
- Publisher: Harcourt Brace Jovanovich
- Publication date: 1991
- Publication place: United States
- Media type: Print (hardcover)
- Pages: xv, 346 pp.
- ISBN: 0-15-164933-2
- Preceded by: Nebula Awards 24
- Followed by: Nebula Awards 26

Nebula Awards 25 is an anthology of award-winning science fiction short works edited by Michael Bishop, the third of three successive volumes published under his editorship. It was first published in hardcover and trade paperback by Harcourt Brace Jovanovich in April 1991.

== Summary ==
The book collects pieces that won or were nominated for the Nebula Awards for novel, novella, novelette and short story for the year 1990 and various nonfiction pieces related to the awards, together with the three Rhysling Award-winning poems for 1989, a couple other stories, and an introduction by the editor. Not all nominees for the various awards are included.

== Contents ==
- "Introduction" (Michael Bishop)
- "What Is Science Fiction?" [essay] (Damon Knight)
- "Ripples in the Dirac Sea" [Best Short Story winner, 1990] (Geoffrey A. Landis)
- "The Avalanche: A View on the SF and Fantasy Novels of 1989" [essay] (Ian Watson)
- "Snake Charm" (The Healer's War, Chapter 16) [Best Novel winner, 1990] (Elizabeth Ann Scarborough)
- "Some Reflections on The Healer's War" [essay] (Elizabeth Ann Scarborough)
- "Solace" [short story] (Gardner Dozois)
- "The Mountains of Mourning" [Best Novella winner, 1990] (Lois McMaster Bujold)
- "Rhysling Award Winners" [essay] (Michael Bishop)
- "Salinity" [Rhysling Award, Best Short Poem winner, 1989] (Robert Frazier)
- "In the Darkened Hours" [Rhysling Award, Best Long Poem co-winner, 1989] (Bruce Boston)
- "Winter Solstice, Camelot Station" [Rhysling Award, Best Long Poem co-winner, 1989] (John M. Ford)
- "For I Have Touched the Sky" [Best Novelette nominee, 1990] (Mike Resnick)
- "Vulgar Art" [essay] (Orson Scott Card)
- "The Ommatidium Miniatures" [Best Short Story nominee, 1990] (Michael Bishop)
- "The Great Nebula Sweep" [essay] (Paul Di Filippo)
- "At the Rialto" [Best Novelette winner, 1990] (Connie Willis)
- "The Exile's Paradigm" [essay] (Richard Grant)
- "In Blue" [novella] (John Crowley)
- "Year of the Bat: Science Fiction Movies of 1989" [essay] (Bill Warren)
- "About the Nebula Awards"
- "Past Nebula Award Winners"

== Reception ==
David E. Jones in the Chicago Tribune writes "for those who would rather nibble gourmet hors d'oeuvres than plunge into [the] full meal" of a novel, Nebula Awards 25 is "chock full of tasty tidbits," with the pieces by Landis, Resnick and Willis "[o]f particular note."

Glenn Grant in the Gazette calls the anthology a "itself a winner," a "beautifully designed collection of fiction, with the added bonus of lively critical debates." He also perceives some flaws; "[a]ll the fiction in the book has merit, as one would expect, but I have to wonder at some of the choices made by the SFWA members," noting that Willis's piece, while "humorous enough, ... fails as satire because the author has no idea what physicists really talk about," and that Bujold's piece is a "drab future whodunnit" whose award for best novella is "hard to explain" other than on grounds of "internal politics and personal popularity." He observes, however, that "editor Michael Bishop chooses well from the runners- up, collecting works that clearly should have won the awards," such as those by John Crowley ("it alone is worth the price of the book"), Michael Bishop and Paul DiFilippo. Of the non-fiction, he pans the essay by Damon Knight that "asks the question, 'What is science fiction?' [and] tests his definition against a list of famous stories and novels to see if his theory works. It doesn't, and neither does his essay." He finds the pieces by Card and Richard Grant "[m]ost provocative, though, ... fascinating [in] that, while they seem to come from opposite ends of a spectrum, they both ... agree that the reader's subjective experience is paramount - the opinions of literature professors be damned."

The anthology was also reviewed by Russell Letson in Locus no. 365, June 1991, John C. Bunnell in Amazing Stories, July 1991, Tom Easton in Analog Science Fiction and Fact, December 1991, and Charles E. Gannon in The New York Review of Science Fiction, May 1992 .

== Awards ==
The book placed seventeenth in the 1992 Locus Poll Award for Best Anthology.
