= Nebula Awards 27 =

1993 anthology edited by James Morrow

- Cover of first edition
- Editor: James Morrow
- Cover artist: Craig Rosenberg
- Language: English
- Series: Nebula Awards
- Genre: Science fiction
- Publisher: Harcourt Brace
- Publication date: 1993
- Publication place: United States
- Media type: Print (hardcover)
- Pages: xv, 331
- ISBN: 978-0-15-164935-8
- OCLC: 28040318
- Dewey Decimal: 813/.0876/08
- LC Class: PS648.S3 N38 1993
- Preceded by: Nebula Awards 26
- Followed by: Nebula Awards 28

Nebula Awards 27 is an anthology of science fiction short works edited by James Morrow, the second of three successive volumes under his editorship. It was first published in hardcover and trade paperback by Harcourt Brace in April 1993.

== Summary ==
The book collects pieces that won or were nominated for the Nebula Awards for novel, novella, novelette and short story for the year 1992, various nonfiction pieces related to the awards, and tributes to recently deceased author Isaac Asimov, together with the two Rhysling Award-winning poems for 1991 and one of the two for 1992 (because it also received a Nebula nomination for Best Short Story), and an introduction by the editor. Not all nominees for the various awards are included.

== Contents ==
- "Introduction" (James Morrow)
- "Science Fiction for What? Remarks on the Year 1991" [essay] (Kathryn Cramer)
- "Guide Dog" [Best Novelette winner, 1992] (Mike Conner)
- "Ma Qui" [Best Short Story winner, 1992] (Alan Brennert)
- "Three Scenes from Stations of the Tide" [Best Novel winner, 1992] (Michael Swanwick)
- "In Memoriam: Isaac Asimov" [essay] (uncredited)
- "Introducing Isaac" [essay] (Arthur C. Clarke)
- "Asimov: The Last Questions" [interview] (George Zebrowski)
- "[Untitled]" [epitaph] (Harlan Ellison)
- "Farewell, Farewell" [essay] (Isaac Asimov)
- "Standing in Line with Mister Jimmy" [Best Novelette nominee, 1992] (James Patrick Kelly)
- "The Dark" [Best Short Story nominee, 1992] (Karen Joy Fowler)
- "They're Made Out of Meat" [Best Short Story nominee, 1992] (Terry Bisson)
- "Precessing the Simulacra for Fun and Profit" [essay] (Bruce Sterling)
- "Auteurs at Work? The Fantastic Films of 1991" [essay] (Bruce Warren)
- "Eighteen Years Old, October Eleventh" [Rhysling Award, Best Short Poem winner, 1991] (Joe Haldeman)
- "The Aging Cryonicist in the Arms of His Mistress Contemplates the Survival of the Species While the Phoenix Is Consumed by Fire" [Rhysling Award, Best Long Poem winner, 1991] (David Memmott)
- "Buffalo" [Best Short Story nominee, 1992] (John Kessel)
- "Getting Real" [Best Novelette nominee, 1992] (Susan Shwartz)
- "the button, and what you know" [Rhysling Award, Best Long Poem winner, 1992 / Best Short Story nominee, 1992] (W. Gregory Stewart)
- "Beggars in Spain" [Best Novella winner, 1992] (Nancy Kress)
- "About the Nebula Awards"
- "Selected Titles from the 1991 Preliminary Nebula Ballot"
- "Past Nebula Award Winners"

== Reception ==
According to the reviewer for Kirkus Reviews, "[t]he fiction here is first-rate, especially the winners." The reviewer notes that the representation of the best novel winner "by three excerpts- -a choice that might not work for every novel, ... captures Swanwick's hallucinatory future to good effect." Bisson's comic dialogue and Stewart's poem are cited as examples that "effectively illustrate the unusually wide variety of approaches- -and general excellence--of the rest" of the contributions. Warren's assessment of the year in film is rated as "knowledgeable," Sterling's "attempt to foresee the fictional shape of the 90's" as "suitably provocative," and the lists of recommended books and stories as perhaps "the most valuable feature here," an "excellent way for the occasional reader to get a sample of the current trends in sf, especially since only two entries here are in other 'best-of-the-year' collections for 1991."

The anthology was also reviewed by Russell Letson in Locus no. 390, July 1993, Joseph Milicia in The New York Review of Science Fiction, July 1993, and Tom Easton in Analog Science Fiction and Fact, October 1993.

== Awards ==
The book placed eighth in the 1994 Locus Poll Award for Best Anthology.
