= Nebula Awards 24 =

1990 anthology edited by Michael Bishop

- Cover of first edition
- Author: edited by Michael Bishop
- Cover artist: Michael Stuckey
- Language: English
- Series: Nebula Awards
- Genre: Science fiction short stories
- Publisher: Harcourt Brace Jovanovich
- Publication date: 1990
- Publication place: United States
- Media type: Print (hardcover)
- Pages: xv, 302 pp.
- ISBN: 0-15-164932-4
- Preceded by: Nebula Awards 23
- Followed by: Nebula Awards 25

Nebula Awards 24 is an anthology of award-winning science fiction short works edited by Michael Bishop, the second of three successive volumes published under his editorship. It was first published in hardcover and trade paperback by Harcourt Brace Jovanovich in April 1990.

== Summary ==
The book collects pieces that won or were nominated for the Nebula Awards for novella, novelette and short story for the year 1989 and various nonfiction pieces related to the awards, together with a profile of 1989 Grand Master award winner Ray Bradbury with some representative pieces by him, tributes to recently deceased authors Clifford D. Simak and Robert A. Heinlein, the three Rhysling Award-winning poems for 1988, a couple other pieces, and an introduction by the editor. Not all nominees for the various awards are included.

== Contents ==
- "Introduction" (Michael Bishop)
- "Themes and Variations: A View on the SF and Fantasy of 1988" [essay] (Ian Watson)
- "Free Associating About Falling Free" [essay] (Lois McMaster Bujold)
- "Ray Bradbury: Ambassador to the Future" [essay] (Greg Bear)
- "The Collector Speaks" [poem] (Ray Bradbury)
- "More Than One Way to Burn a Book" [essay] (Ray Bradbury)
- "Bible Stories for Adults, No. 17: The Deluge" [Best Short Story winner, 1989) (James Morrow)
- "The Devil's Arithmetic" (excerpt) [Best Novella nominee, 1989] (Jane Yolen)
- "Rhysling Award Winners" [essay] (Michael Bishop)
- "The Nightmare Collector" [Rhysling Award, Best Short Poem co-winner, 1988] (Bruce Boston)
- "Rocky Road to Hoe" [Rhysling Award, Best Short Poem co-winner, 1988] (Suzette Haden Elgin)
- "White Trains" [Rhysling Award, Best Long Poem winner, 1988] (Lucius Shepard)
- "Schrödinger's Kitten" [Best Novelette winner, 1989] (George Alec Effinger)
- "The Fort Moxie Branch" [Best Short Story nominee, 1989] (Jack McDevitt)
- "In Memoriam" [essay] (Michael Bishop)
- "In Memoriam: Clifford D. Simak" [essay] (Gordon R. Dickson)
- "In Memoriam: Robert A. Heinlein" [essay] (Frank M. Robinson)
- "Ginny Sweethips' Flying Circus" [Best Novelette nominee, 1989) (Neal Barrett, Jr.)
- "The Other Dead Man" [short story] (Gene Wolfe)
- "The Daily Chernobyl" [poem] (Robert Frazier)
- "The Last of the Winnebagos" [Best Novella winner, 1989] (Connie Willis)
- "My Alphabet Starts Where Your Alphabet Ends" [essay] (Paul Di Filippo)
- "The Year of the Pratfall: SF Movies of 1988" [essay] (Bill Warren)
- "About the Nebulas"

== Reception ==
Publishers Weekly calls the book a "richly eclectic volume" and a "high-quality collection of short fiction, prose, humor writing and poetry." Receiving particular comment are the stories by Willis, a "high point," Yolen, and Effinger, and the essays by Bradbury and Di Filippo (who "berates the genre for ignoring Dr. Seuss").

The anthology was also reviewed by Gordon Van Gelder in The New York Review of Science Fiction, April 1990, Tom Easton in Analog Science Fiction and Fact, October 1990, and Doug Fratz in Quantum, Spring 1990.

== Awards ==
The book placed seventh in the 1991 Locus Poll Award for Best Anthology.
