= Nebula Awards 21 =

1986 anthology edited by George Zebrowski

- Cover of first edition
- Author: edited by George Zebrowski
- Cover artist: Lanson Moles
- Language: English
- Series: Nebula Awards
- Genre: Science fiction short stories
- Publisher: Harcourt Brace Jovanovich
- Publication date: 1986
- Publication place: United States
- Media type: Print (paperback), hardcover
- Pages: xiii, 333
- ISBN: 0-15-665478-4
- Preceded by: Nebula Awards 20
- Followed by: Nebula Awards 22

Nebula Awards 21 is an anthology of award-winning science fiction short works edited by George Zebrowski, the second of three successive volumes under his editorship. It was first published in trade paperback by Harcourt Brace Jovanovich in December 1986, with a hardcover edition following from the same publisher in January 1987.

== Summary ==
The book collects pieces that won or were nominated for the Nebula Awards for novella, novelette and short story for the year 1986 and various nonfiction pieces related to the awards, together with a story by 1986 Grand Master award winner Arthur C. Clarke, the two Rhysling Award-winning poems for 1985, a couple other pieces, and an introduction by the editor. Not all nominees for the various awards are included.

== Contents ==
- "Introduction" (George Zebrowski)
- "What Was 1985 That We Were Mindful of It?" [essay] (Algis Budrys)
- "Heirs of the Perisphere" [Best Short Story nominee, 1986] (Howard Waldrop)
- "Out of All Them Bright Stars" [Best Short Story winner, 1986] (Nancy Kress)
- "The Fringe" [Best Novelette nominee, 1986] (Orson Scott Card)
- "Sailing to Byzantium" [Best Novella winner, 1986] (Robert Silverberg)
- "More Than the Sum of His Parts" [Best Short Story nominee, 1986] (Joe Haldeman)
- "Portraits of His Children" [Best Novelette Winner, 1986] (George R. R. Martin)
- "For Spacers Snarled in the Hair of Comets" [Rhysling Award, Short Poem winner, 1985] (Bruce Boston)
- "Letter from Caroline Herschel (1750–1848)" [Rhysling Award, Long Poem winner, 1985] (Siv Cedering)
- "The Steam-Powered Word Processor" [short story] (Arthur C. Clarke)
- "Paper Dragons" [Best Short Story nominee, 1986] (James P. Blaylock)
- "Effing the Ineffable" [essay] (Gregory Benford)
- "Science Fiction Films of 1985" [essay] (Bill Warren)

== Reception ==
Publishers Weekly calls the anthology's contents "a mixed bag, [though] the best of them are treasures." The pieces by Card, Silverberg and Blaylock ("[p]erhaps best of all") are singled out for comment, as are the "three critical essays, two of which (by Algis Budrys and Gregory Benford) are stimulating reevaluations of science fiction."

John G. Cramer in the Los Angeles Times judges the book a "first rate anthology," commenting on the pieces by Kress ("rather mainstream"), Martin ("a very writerly tale") and Silverberg, while noting those by Haldeman, Card, Blaylock and Waldrop as "also excellent." Of the nonfiction pieces, he calls Budrys's "penetrating" and Benford's "interesting." He criticises the inclusion of the lengthy (40 pages) discussion of science fiction films, however, opining that "[i]f I have any problem ... it is the inappropriateness of the latter piece. Nebulas are, for excellent reasons, not awarded for film. It is regrettable that the editor chose to devote 14% of the anthology to a survey of films, which, in many cases, deserve obscurity." Cramer feels including "some of the excellent Nebula nominees missing from this volume" would have been a better use of the space.

The anthology was also reviewed by Debbie Notkin in Locus v. 20, no. 1 (issue no. 312), January 1987, Dave Mead in Fantasy Review v. 10, no. 2 (issue no. 99), March 1987, Edward Bryant in Rod Serling's The Twilight Zone Magazine v. 7, no. 2, June 1987, Don D'Ammassa in Science Fiction Chronicle v. 9, no. 1 (issue no. 97), October 1987, and Tom Easton in Analog Science Fiction/Science Fact, v. 107, no. 10, October 1987.

== Awards ==
The book placed sixteenth in the 1987 Locus Poll Award for Best Anthology.
