= Songs and Sonnets Atlantean =

Three-volume series of poetry collections by Donald Sidney-Fryer

- Jacket illustration by Gordon R. Barnett for first Songs and Sonnets Atlantean
- Author: Donald Sidney-Fryer
- Cover artist: Gordon R. Barnett
- Language: English
- Genre: poetry
- Publisher: Arkham House, Wildside Press, Phosphor Lantern Press, Hippocampus Press
- Publication date: First Series June 16, 1971; Second Series summer 2003; Third Series September 2005; trilogy 2008
- Publication place: United States
- Media type: Printed volumes
- Pages: First Series; xxx, 134 pp.; Second Series 159 pp.; Third Series 192 pp.; trilogy 550 pp.

Songs and Sonnets Atlantean refers to either the 1971 first volume in a trilogy of poetry collections by Donald Sidney-Fryer or to his complete trilogy. Each volume claims some poems were written by poets in the lost continent of Atlantis and translated by Sidney-Fryer into English. Songs and Sonnets Atlantean: The Second Series was published in 2003, and The Third Series in 2005. All three Atlantean collections were gathered in the 2008 volume The Atlantis Fragments: The Trilogy of Songs and Sonnets Atlantean. Sidney-Fryer also wrote two companion novels. His series has been praised by critics. “Fryer has created, in his fictional Atlantis, an entire civilization and a body of absorbing literature,” said New Bedford Standard-Times. Fritz Leiber wrote in Fantastic Stories: “A total picture of a fabulous Atlantis is presented, more convincing and touching than that of a novel might be. But the book ... shows much more than that. Sunken Atlantis becomes a symbol of all lost glories and grandeurs of Earth.” The Murfreesboro Sidelines reported: “The poems are of unearthly beauty. ... Whether the poems really are from the Atlantean or whether they are the creations of the poet Fryer, they deserve to be read and to be experienced.”

== Creation and publication ==
=== Songs and Sonnets Atlantean (later called "the First Series") ===
Sidney-Fryer began writing the poems in March 1961, inspired by The Faerie Queene by Edmund Spenser. He took three years to write approximately twelve poems and mailed them to August Derleth, the owner of publishing company Arkham House. Derleth praised them and encouraged Sidney-Fryer to write enough poetry for a book. Writing the remainder of Songs and Sonnets Atlantean took Sidney-Fryer another seven years.

The finished book tells the story of the romance between Princess Aïs and Prince Atlantarion in the kingdom of Atlantis, "but," wrote Sidney-Fryer, "in the form of a seemingly miscellaneous or random complilation of poems or 'fragments' ... Thus, the reader must 'work' to discover or recover the main narrative; ... but 'clues' are scattered both carefully and abundantly over the entire 'terrain' from the beginning of the book (including both its outer front dust-jacket and the inner front dust-jacket or flap) up through its finish (including the printer's note, the inner back dust-jacket or flap, and then the final and outer back dust-jacket...)." The book's "Introduction" and "Notes" sections help tell the story. The scholarly "Introduction" explains how the poems were created in Atlantis, how they were lost for thousands of years, and how they were rediscovered. The introduction's author, Dr. Ibid Massachusetts Andor, also provides an explanatory "Notes" section givinging background for individual poems. "Dr. Andor" is actually a pseudonym for Sidney-Fryer. Sidney-Fryer used his memories of the whaling port New Bedford, Massachusetts--where he had spent his childhood and youth--to describe the seaport cities of his fictional Atlantis.

Sidney-Fryer erroneously believed that San Francisco publisher A. M. Robertson published 2,000 copies of poetry collections by George Sterling. He persuaded Derleth that instead of publishing 500 copies (Arkham House's normal print quantity for poetry books) he should publish 2,000 copies of Songs and Sonnets Atlantean. The book was published June 16, 1971 by Arkham House in an edition of 2,045 copies. Copies of this verse collection exist both with and without the limitation page bound in the rear of the book; the priorities of these states are not known. The day after the book's publication, the poet went to Sauk City to visit Arkham House, where he personally inscribed, signed, and dated an unknown number of copies. The inscription was identical in each book and reads: "Atlantean Greetings & Salutations/ Donald Sidney-Fryer/ the Last of the Courtly Poets,/ 17 June 1971." Other signed copies with variations of this inscription have been noted and may have been signed at different dates. This first volume went out of print in the early 1980s.

=== Songs and Sonnets Atlantean: The Second Series ===
In the late 1980s, Stanley McNail encouraged Sidney-Fryer to write a sequel to Songs and Sonnets Atlantean. As Sidney-Fryer completed a section of the book, "to a circle of close and long-term friends I issued some of the individual sections in a series of photocopied booklets . . . [T]hey made their appearance in 1991, 1992, 1996, and 1997, respectively." He completed writing the book in June 1998 and sent it to publishers. All rejected it, until August 2001, when Keith Allen Daniels, owner of Anamnesis Press, planned to publish it. Before the book was printed, Daniels died of cancer.

Literary historian Don Herron took Sidney-Fryer's manuscript to John Gregory Betancourt of Wildside Press, who accepted it. Wildside Press published Songs and Sonnets Atlantean: The Second Series in the summer of 2003.

=== Songs and Sonnets Atlantean: The Third Series ===
Even before Sidney-Fryer's Songs and Sonnets Atlantean: Second Series was published, he began to write a third volume. "I began to create the series in the Winter of 2001-2002, and managed to complete it in the Winter of 2004-2005. During the three years required to complete the collection, I issued—again to a circle of close and long-term friends—some of the individual sections in a series of photocopied booklets, thus privately printed, and they made their appearance in 2002, 2003, 2004, and 2005, respectively." It was accepted for publication by Black Coat Press, but for some reason Black Coat did not publish the book. Black Coat did, however, produce the volume for Sidney-Fryer.

Songs and Sonnets Atlantean: The Third Series was self-published by Sidney-Fryer while he lived in Los Angeles, under his own Phosphor Lantern Press company name, in 2005.

=== The Trilogy of the Songs and Sonnets Atlantean ===
Finally, in 2008 New York publisher Hippocampus Press produced all three books together in one volume titled The Atlantis Fragments: The Trilogy of the Songs and Sonnets Atlantean. The hardcover edition also includes a front endpaper map of the continent of Atlantis "and its Relationship to the Known World," back endpaper maps of showing details of the isle of Atlantis and its capital, the city of Atlantis; and an introduction by author Brian Stableford.

=== The Atlantis Fragments: The Novel ===
Sidney-Fryer's companion novel about the history and end of Atlantis, The Atlantis Fragments: The Novel, was published in 2011 by Hippocampus Press.

Sidney-Fryer described the novel's origins: "The [Atlantean] poetry grew out of the background I had created for the novel, but I didn't write the novel until within the last few years. Obviously Atlantis is a metaphor for me. People ask, 'Do you believe in Atlantis?' 'I do believe in it,' I respond, 'at least metaphorically.' It has real emotions attached to it."

=== West of Wherevermore: Interlude in Atlantis ===
He also wrote a shorter second Atlantean novel, West of Wherevermore: Interlude in Atlantis, printed in Sidney-Fryer's 2016 book West of Wherevermore and Other Travel Writings. The second novel describes the five-year wedding voyage of the Princess Aïs and the Prince Atlantaryon. (Confusingly, the novel was not included in Sidney-Fryer's similarly-named book West of Wherevermore and Other Essays, published in 2019.)

== Critical responses to the First Series ==
August Derleth’s publishing company Arkham House published Songs and Sonnets Atlantean on June 16, 1971. 18 days later Derleth died of a heart attack. His small publishing company did little to publicize the new book. Sidney-Fryer mailed copies to newspaper and magazine reviewers himself.

Only a few mainstream media publications paid any attention to a poetry book from a small publisher by an unknown poet. The New Bedford Standard-Times said: “Fryer has created, in his fictional Atlantis, an entire civilization and a body of absorbing literature.” In the national magazine The Advocate, poet Richard L. Tierney enthused: “It is sheer beauty, and one can tell that Mr. Sidney-Fryer is a lover of life and beauty to the core of his being. ... I am overwhelmed by the depth of feeling and the rich intricacy with which Donald Sidney-Fryer depicts his world. For this creation is indeed a world, not just a book.” University Bookman: A Quarterly Review called Songs and Sonnets Atlantean “a delightful book of verse ... a work that reflects a glittering imagination and no mean talent.” “The poems are of unearthly beauty,” said the Murfreesboro Sidelines in Tennessee. It continued: “The imagery is lush, exotic, full of colors and magic names. ... Whether the poems really are from the Atlantean or whether they are the creations of the poet Fryer, they deserve to be read and to be experienced.” The Lake Geneva Regional News ended its review: “Our complaint is that we cannot possibly thank Donald Fryer enough for this book which hints of a land beyond redemption and entices us into believing we have traveled there.”

Sidney-Fryer generated additional coverage by sending copies to reviewers with specialty journals that cover science fiction and fantasy literature. Most of their reviews were favorable, but not all. In Luna Monthly, Mark Purcell wrote a lengthy review that decided “Mr. Fryer has nothing to say in his poems. ... The strict prose sense in Fryer's poems is banal.” Sidney-Fryer published a long, polite response which expressed his gratitude to Purcell for reviewing Songs and Sonnets Atlantean and then walked through Purcell's review step-by-step correcting misunderstandings and errors.

Other fantasy specialists disagreed with Purcell. Author Jack L. Chalker wrote: “Fryer's an entertaining and competent poet who reads well, and people who like fantasy poetry in general (as I do) will find the collection worth reading.” In Fantastic Stories, Fritz Leiber said: “A total picture of a fabulous Atlantis is presented, more convincing and touching than that of a novel might be. But the book ... shows much more than that. Sunken Atlantis becomes a symbol of all lost glories and grandeurs of Earth.” In The Magazine of Fantasy and Science Fiction, Gahan Wilson reported: “He has managed in his slim book, slim only in size, to evoke an Atlantis which is both haunting and astonishingly solid.”

In publications focused on fantasy literature, the most impressive coverage appeared in the journal Nyctalops, which devoted sixty percent of a double issue to Sidney-Fryer, Songs and Sonnets Atlantean, and his other works. Included in the many articles was one praising “the joy of sound” in Sidney-Fryer's poetry and calling Songs and Sonnets Atlantean “that modern Arkham House masterpiece.” Professor Charles K. Wolfe wrote a detailed, insightful investigation of the book's parts and how they affected readers, pointing out: “Songs and Sonnets Atlantean contains many different kinds of writing, but its impact is above all synergistic: its overall structure and overall effect are more than simply the sum of its parts and make the book what it is, a unique application of the most modern literary methods to some of the oldest literary forms.”

Decades later in France, fantasy editor and critic Philippe Gindre wrote of the poems: "Even if their formal precision might not fail to disconcert the contemporary reader, the end product remains fascinating. Poems in prose and in verse, scholarly annotations, digressive commentaries succeed and complete each other so as to result in a literary object beyond compare."

== Critical responses to the Second Series ==
All known critical evaluations of Songs and Sonnets Atlantean: The Second Series were favorable. Most called Sidney-Fryer's long narrative poem "A Vision of a Castle Deep in Averonne" a highlight of the book.

Literary historian S. T. Joshi stated:

“This remarkable collection of poems and prose poems displays Sidney-Fryer as an assured master of many poetic forms—the quatrain, the sonnet, the ode, and especially the alexandrine, which has become his signature metre—as well as a fantastic imagination that, to be sure, draws upon the work of [Clark Ashton] Smith, [Ambrose] Bierce, and the Elizabethans but remains distinctively his own. … It displays all the virtues we have come to expect from Sidney-Fryer: felicitous word-choice, precision in metre, and especially a vibrant, exotic imagination that vivifies realms of fantasy into living realities.

“The crown jewel of Songs and Sonnets Atlantean: The Second Series is “A Vision of a Castle Deep in Averonne”, a sixty-page narrative poem with all the richness of incident, depth of character portrayal, and fantastic imagination of a novel, yet written in smoothly flowing alexandrines that leave the reader hoping the poem will never end. … The volume concludes with a hefty section of notes on the poems—notes that, in the substantial background they provide on the poems, are in many cases nearly as fascinating as the poems themselves.”

Fantasy critic Jesse F. Knight wrote: “Sidney-Fryer is a master of the sonnet form, and there are plenty examples in this collection, from the poignant “In an Atlantean Bath” to the unsettling “Rêverie Gothique,” from the bleak “Beyond Ultima Thule” to the idealistic, yet at the same time sensual “An Enchantress out of Time.” But he also displays his poetic strength, too, his ability to sustain a narrative, with an extraordinary and enormous poem of sixty pages, a weird tale of Averonne. … He writes about something more fundamental than nostalgia, something rooted more deeply in the human psyche. For after all, perhaps the ultimate haunting is that recognition of what might have been.”

In France, Philippe Gindre reported: “The privileged few who could appreciate, on our side of the Atlantic, the first volume of Songs and Sonnets Atlantean, will rediscover intact the inspiration so sui generis of Donald Sidney-Fryer in such poems at “Our Lady of the Unicorn,” “Reverie Gothique,” or the very beautiful “Beyond Ultima Thule”, attributed to the prince Atlantarion.”

In England, novelist Brian Stableford summarized the book's contents: “The metafictional stratification of the whole body of work is fascinating in its depth and complexity, moving from the bedrock of a beautifully ornate version of the legendary Atlantis through the Elizabethan fabulations of Edmund Spenser, the neo-paganism of the French Parnassians and the unrepentant fantasizing of the American Bohemians of the West Coast, to a fresh and deftly-stylized present day. Such scope is rare; coherence of vision and supple exploitation of exotic methods within such scope is even rarer. The accomplished dexterity with which so many innovative links are forged and sewn is remarkable, and the whole tapestry is a brilliant achievement."

== Critical responses to the Third Series ==
Because Sidney-Fryer self-published Songs and Sonnets Atlantean: The Third Series, little publicity was generated. Fantasy literature historian Scott Connors reviewed the new book in Weird Tales: "A linear descendent of Edmund Spenser by way of the California Romantics (a group that included [Clark Ashton] Smith, George Sterling and Nora May French), Sidney-Fryer's work emphasizes clarity, accessibility and simplicity in form, and magic, music and continuity in content. … There is little here that is terrible, but much that is wondrous, often infused with a fey wit that reflects a gentleness we could only wish were more often found in this world."

== Contents of the First Series ==
Songs and Sonnets Atlantean contains the following pieces. Items presented as written by poets from the lost continent of Atlantis are prefaced with "(A)". All (A) items are presented as originally written in the Atlantean language but surviving only as French translations by Michel de Labretagne (a pseudonym of Donald Sidney-Fryer) and translated by Sidney-Fryer. Items lacking the (A) label are presented as either written by Sidney-Fryer or translated by Sidney-Fryer from other French poets.

"Introduction" by Dr. Ibid M. Andor (pseudonym of Donald Sidney-Fryer)

- "Avalonessys" (Translated from the French of Michel de Labretagne.)
- (A) "The Crown and Trident Imperial" (Translated from the Atlantean of an unknown poet.)
- (A) "Atlantis" (Translated from the Atlantean of Athallarion.)
- "The Rose and the Thorn" (Translated from the French of Michel de Labretagne.)
- "Rose Escarlate" (Translated from the French of Michel de Labretagne.)
- (A) "'O Ebon-Colored Rose'" (Translated from the Atlantean of Prince Atlantarion.)
- (A) "Your Mouth of Pomegranate" (Translated from the Atlantean of Prince Atlantarion.)
- "As Buds and Blossoms in the Month of May the Rose" (Translated from the French of Pierre de Ronsard.)
- "To Clark Ashton Smith"
- "Pavane"
- (A) "When We Were Prince and Princess" (Translated from the Atlantean of King Atlantarion I.)
- (A) "The Crown and Trident" (Translated from the Atlantean of King Atlantarion I.)
- (A) "Song" (Translated from the Atlantean of Athallarion.)
- "'Thy Spirit Walks the Sea'" (To Nora May French)
- (A) "Recompense" (Translated from the Atlantean of an unknown poet.)
- "To a Youth"
- "Spenserian Stanza-Sonnet Empourpré"
- "A Symbol for All Splendor Lost" (Opening of poem is by George Sterling. Written about Atlantis, but not presented as written by an Atlantean poet.)
- "The Ashes in the Rose Garden" (To "B. M. B.", who was possibly Bertha Maude Severance Haas Boyd [1 January 1885 - 25 January 1965], buried in plot 52D of Mountain View Cemetery in Oakland, California.)
- "To Edmund Spenser"
- (A) "Rose Verdastre" (Translated from the Atlantean of Athallarion.)
- "Ave Atque Vale"
- "Thaïs and Alexander in Persepolis"
- (A) "A Fragment" (Translated from the Atlantean of an unknown poet.)
- "O fair dark eyes, O glances turned aside" (Translated from the French of Louise Labé.)
- "The Cydnus" (Translated from the French of José-Maria de Heredia.)
- "Golden Mycenae"
- (A) "Lullaby" (Translated from the Atlantean of Prince Atlantarion.)

Minor Chronicles of Atlantis (Except "Proem", all other items in this section are prose poems translated from the Atlantean of Aon.)

- "Proem" by Michel de Labretagne (pseudonym of Donald Sidney-Fryer)
- (A) "The Hippokamp"
- (A) "The Alpha Huge"
- (A) "The River Called Amphus"
- (A) "The Amphus Delta"
- (A) "The Imperial Crown Jewels of Atlantis"
- (A) "The Atlantean Obelisk"
- (A) "The Garden of Jealous Roses"
- (A) "The Tale of an Olden Love"
- (A) "The Shepherd and the Shepherdess"
- (A) "Reciprocity"
- (A) "The Iffinnix"
- (A) "A Vision of Strange Splendor"

- "Kilcolman Castle: 20 August 1965" (to Edmund Spenser)
- (A) "Aubade" (Translated from the Atlantean of Prince Atlantarion.)
- "The Lilac Hedge at Cassell Prairie: 27 May 1967" (to August Derleth)
- (A) "Black Poppy and Black Lotus" (Translated from the Atlantean of Athallarion.)
- "The House of Roses" (to George Sterling)
- (A) "'The Musical Note of Swans...Before Their Death'" (Translated from the Atlantean of Athallarion.)
- "Green Sleeves"
- "O Beautiful Dark-Amber Eyes of Old" (Translated from the French of Michel de Labretagne.)
- "The Forsaken Palace" (to Algernon Charles Swinburne)
- "For the Shapes of Clay of Ambrose Bierce"
- "Connaissance Fatale"
- "For the Black Beetles in Amber of Ambrose Bierce"
- "Offrande Exotique" (to Mary Eulalie Shannon)

Sonnets on an Empire of Many Waters

- I. (A) "Here, where the fountains of the deep-sea flow" (No source noted.)
- II. (A) "Atlantis" (Translated from the Atlantean of Athallarion.)
- III. (A) "Gades" (Translated from the Atlantean of Athallarion.)
- IV. (A) "Atlantigades" (Translated from the Atlantean of Athallarion.)
- V. (A) "Atkantharia" (Translated from the Atlantean of Athallarion.)
- VI. (A) "Iffrikonn-Yssthia" (Translated from the Atlantean of Athallarion.)
- VII. (A) "Atalantessys" (Translated from the Atlantean of Athallarion.)
- VIII. (A) "Atlantillia" (Translated from the Atlantean of Athallarion.)
- IX. (A) "Atatemthessys" (Translated from the Atlantean of Athallarion.)
- X. (A) "At-Thulonn" (Translated from the Atlantean of Athallarion.)
- XI. (A) "Avalonessys" (Translated from the Atlantean of Athallarion.)
- XII. (A) "Poseidonis" (Translated from the Atlantean of Athallarion.)
- XIII. (A) "The Merchant-Princes" (Translated from the Atlantean of Athallarion.)
- XIV. (A) "An Argosy of Trade" (Translated from the Atlantean of Athallarion.)
- XV. (A) "Memories of the Astazhan" (Translated from the Atlantean of Aänsess.)
- XVI. (A) "A Letter from Valoth" (Translated from the Atlantean of Aänsess.)
- XVII. (A) "No, not until the final age of Earth" (No source noted.)

Commendatory and Dedicatory Poems

- "To an Atlantean Poet" (to Donald Sidney-Fryer) by Margo Skinner
- "Inspiration" (to Donald Sidney-Fryer) by Ian M. M. Law
- "Secretest" (to Donald Sidney-Fryer) by Fritz Leiber
- "To Gloria Kathleen [Braly Fryer]"
- "To Master Edmund Spenser: His Great Song"

"Notes" by Dr. Ibid M. Andor (pseudonym of Donald Sidney-Fryer)
