= Donald Sidney-Fryer =

American poet, historian and performer (1934–2026)

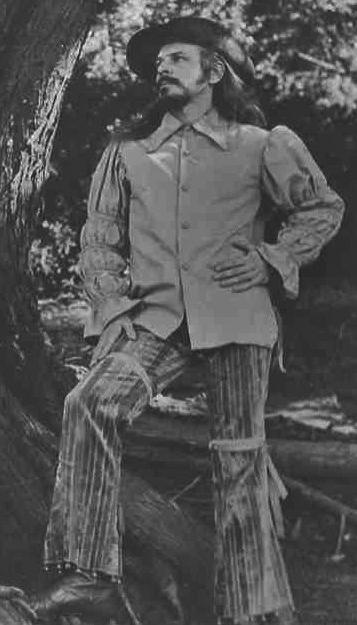
- Sidney-Fryer in troubadour costume, 1971 photo by John Frazer
- Born: Donald Sidney Fryer, Junior; September 8, 1934; New Bedford, Massachusetts, U.S.
- Died: May 2, 2026 (aged 91); Chatham, Massachusetts, U.S.
- Education: University of California, Los Angeles Bachelor of Arts in French; minor in Spanish
- Occupations: writer; poet; critic; literary historian; ballet historian; playwright; performer
- Spouse: Gloria Kathleen Braly (divorced)
- Writing career
- Pen name: Dr. Ibid M. Andor; Donaldo; Michel de Labretagne
- Years active: 1961–2026
- Genres: lyric poetry (sonnet, elegy, ode, epigram); narrative poetry (ballad, fantasy, horror, supernatural); humorous verse (light verse, parody, satire); song; solo performance; essay; short story; fiction
- Notable works: St. George and the Dragon; Songs and Sonnets Atlantean; The Golden State Phantastics: The California Romantics and Related Subjects; Emperor of Dreams: A Clark Ashton Smith Bibliography; The Case of the Light Fantastic Toe: The Romantic Ballet and Signor Maestro Cesare Pugni, as Well as Their Survival by Means of Tsarist Russia [5 volumes plus index volume]
- Movement: Neo-Romanticism

Donald Sidney-Fryer (September 8, 1934 – May 2, 2026) was an American poet, critic, literary historian, ballet historian and performer. Edmund Spenser and Clark Ashton Smith were his “two poetic mentors.” Sidney-Fryer saw his poetry as part of a "Modern Romanticism" tradition along with Ashton Smith, Ambrose Bierce, George Sterling, and other poets he calls the “California Romantics”. Poet Richard L. Tierney said Sidney-Fryer's poems "make us see ... the ideals that moved us when we were less 'secure' and more human: adventure, love of life, and above all, the intricate beauty of a world long vanished—yet not vanished, if only we had eyes to see." Sidney-Fryer was a pioneering literary historian and critic focusing on California literature and writers. He was called "the pre-eminent scholar of [Clark Ashton Smith]’s work”, who “... not only established the foundations for all future scholarship in this field, but he also wrote some of the most insightful and valuable evaluations of Smith's oeuvre ever written.” His five-volume history of Romantic Ballet and the career of ballet composer Cesare Pugni, The Case of the Light Fantastic Toe, was described as "deserv[ing] to be in every college music library." Sidney-Fryer also promoted poets and poetry by writing and starring in one-man shows throughout the United States and Great Britain, often appearing in an Elizabethan English costume and billing himself as "the last of the courtly poets."

== Marine Corps service and education ==
Sidney-Fryer was born and raised in the Atlantic coastal city of New Bedford, Massachusetts. He was originally named Donald Sidney Fryer, Junior, but early in life dropped the "Junior," and in 1970 or early 1971 added a hyphen between his middle and last names.

After graduating from high school, Sidney-Fryer could not afford to go to college. He knew the United States G. I. Bill would pay for college after military service, so to further his education he enlisted in the United States Marine Corps in October 1953. In the Marines' three libraries at Naval Air Station Jacksonville, Florida, Sidney-Fryer first began reading science fiction. Then he was transferred to the Marine Air Station at Opa-locka (today the Coast Guard Air Station Miami). At the Opa-locka base library, Sidney-Fryer first read the works of Arthur C. Clarke, August Derleth, H. P. Lovecraft, Robert E. Howard, and Clark Ashton Smith. He was especially affected by Smith's story “The City of the Singing Flame”:

Emotionally and spiritually this last narrative, written in quite a remarkable and highly poetic prose, the like of which I had never encountered before, bowled me over and knocked me down, not just because of the colorful, vivid, and intense imagination that had shaped the story but equally because of the uncommon vocabulary without which the story could not have come into existence. Because I had studied Latin, French, and English each for four years in high school, particularly Latin, the vocabulary per se gave me no real problem. However, I had almost never before encountered such uncommon words, obviously Latinate, employed in a piece of fiction ...

On September 5, 1955, Sidney-Fryer was transferred to Marine Corps Air Station El Toro in Orange County, California. In the base library there, he was impressed by The Collected Writings of Ambrose Bierce.

In September 1956, Sidney-Fryer began studies at the University of California, Los Angeles. He initially majored in theatre arts and minored in French. In the evenings he studied ballet under Tatiana Riabouchinska, formerly with the Ballets Russes, and her husband David Lichine. He had performing in mind: “Even if I could not have become a ballet dancer at twenty or twenty-one, I knew the value of rigorous dance training in shaping a capable all-around performer.” After two years, he changed his major to French and minor to Spanish, thinking he would become a teacher of languages.

== 1956–1971: Early literary work ==
Sidney-Fryer used the libraries of UCLA to investigate the history and creators of Romantic Ballet, which flourished from 1827 to the late 1800s. He took note of composer Cesare Pugni, who wrote symphonies, ten operas, forty masses, and more than three hundred ballet scores. Little had been published about Pugni and his works. Sidney-Fryer began compiling the names of Pugni's ballet scores and data about them. In addition to his own research, he hired researchers in London and Milan to uncover more information. Sidney-Fryer assembled the information as Cesare Pugni, 180?-1870: Checklist of Ballets and self-published a limited number of copies. A publisher in Italy then paid Sidney-Fryer to include his checklist in volume seven of its Enciclopedia dello Spettacolo in 1961.

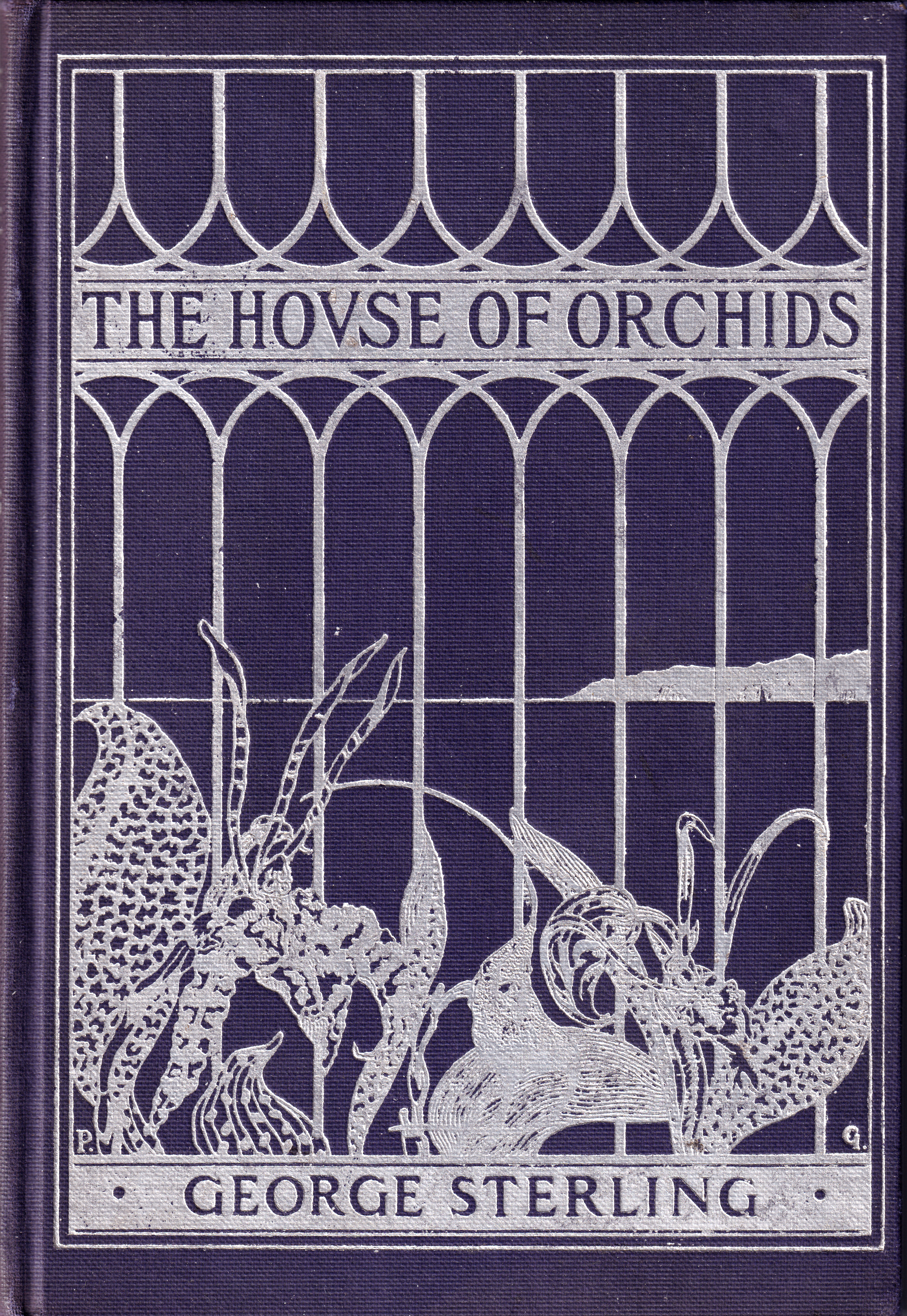
1911 The House of Orchids and Other Poems by George Sterling, cover art by Porter Garnett.

On August 26 and 27, 1958, Sidney-Fryer visited his literary hero Clark Ashton Smith and Smith's wife Carol in their home in Pacific Grove, California. Sidney-Fryer recalled, “when I asked him what poet meant to him what [Smith] meant to me, he turned around to a bookcase behind him and picked out a volume that had a dark blue Art Nouveau cover with a pictorial design and printing etched in silver: The House of Orchids (1911), by George Sterling.” Sidney-Fryer said Smith "made me appreciate Sterling strongly. To me Sterling was the epitome of Romanticism which strongly influenced my style of Romanticism."

On Friday, September 5, 1959, he returned to the Smiths’ home in Pacific Grove for a second visit. The first night he stayed at a motel, but the Smiths offered for Sidney-Fryer to stay with them for the remainder of his visit. The two men passionately discussed literature for days. Smith had a copy of an extremely rare bibliography of his fiction, and gave Sidney-Fryer permission to use Smith's own typewriter in his own study to type a copy of the bibliography for Sidney-Fryer's use. Sidney-Fryer left the Smiths on September 9. The bibliography Sidney-Fryer typed was Thomas G. L. Cockcroft's The Tales of Clark Ashton Smith: A Bibliography. Sidney-Fryer corresponded with Cockcroft about Smith's writings. Then Sidney-Fryer began the research to write a bibliography of all of Clark Ashton Smith's writings, a project which would take him years to complete. In the autumn of 1960, he met Forrest J. Ackerman, who helped Sidney-Fryer track down many Smith writings published in fantasy and science fiction fan publications.

In February 1961, Sidney-Fryer met Fritz Leiber and his first wife Jonquil, who became close friends and encouraged his Smith research. Leiber urged Sidney-Fryer to read Edmund Spenser’s epic fantasy poem The Faerie Queene, which changed his life:

The Faerie Queene proved a great shock and a great revelation, as great as had the writings of Clark Ashton Smith, but it was the poetry of Spenser that gave me the impetus to write my first poetry since the juvenilia I had composed in late grammar school and early high school. The Leibers encouraged me just as much in my own writing as in my Smith research.

Inspired by The Faerie Queene, in March 1961 Sidney-Fryer began to write poetry. In September 1964 he received his bachelor's degree in French from UCLA. In addition to English, French, Spanish, and Latin, Sidney-Fryer also learned German, Russian, Italian, Portuguese, and Greek.

1965 Poems in Prose by Clark Ashton Smith, edited by Donald Sidney-Fryer.

After Clark Ashton Smith's death in 1961, Sidney-Fryer received permission from Smith's widow Carol to research and assemble a collection of Smith's prose poems, which he completed in 1964. For the collection's introduction he wrote a history of prose poems and of Smith's achievements in that field. In June 1965, Arkham House published Sidney-Fryer's anthology of Smith's prose poems. French editor and critic Philippe Gindre called the book "the magnificent Poems in Prose."

In the middle of 1964, Sidney-Fryer moved to Auburn, California (Clark Ashton Smith's hometown). That year he completed his bibliography of Smith's writings. In the mid-1960s he found a publisher willing to publish the bibliography, but the publisher would take more than ten years to bring it out.

He moved to San Francisco in January 1966. He would live in San Francisco until 1975. He called himself "a practicing bisexual or rather trisexual--that is, try anything sexual with human beings." He met and fell in love with dental hygienist Gloria Kathleen Braly. After two years of living together they married in 1969 and lived in an open marriage. After two years of marriage, they divorced, but remained friends.

1970 Other Dimensions by Clark Ashton Smith, edited by Donald Sidney-Fryer.

After the success of the anthology Poems in Prose Sidney-Fryer had edited, he suggested to Arkham House owner August Derleth a successor project, a collection of all known uncollected stories by Clark Ashton Smith. Derleth accepted his idea, and the collection was published as Other Dimensions in 1970. For unknown reasons, Sidney-Fryer was not credited as editor in the published book.

1971 Songs and Sonnets Atlantean by Donald Sidney-Fryer.

After ten years of work, Sidney-Fryer completed his first book of poetry. Songs and Sonnets Atlantean was published by Arkham House in 1971. The book claims 43 of its 74 poems were written by poets in the lost continent of Atlantis and translated by Sidney-Fryer into English. It begins with a scholarly introduction explaining how the poems were created in Atlantis, how they were lost for thousands of years, and how they were rediscovered. The introduction's author, Dr. Ibid M. Andor, also provides explanatory notes for individual poems. "Dr. Andor" is actually a pseudonym for Sidney-Fryer. "Mr. Fryer has nothing to say in his poems," wrote an unhappy reviewer; "The strict prose sense in Fryer's poems is banal." However, most reviews were favorable. “Fryer has created, in his fictional Atlantis, an entire civilization and a body of absorbing literature,” said New Bedford Standard-Times. Fritz Leiber wrote in Fantastic Stories: “A total picture of a fabulous Atlantis is presented, more convincing and touching than that of a novel might be. But the book ... shows much more than that. Sunken Atlantis becomes a symbol of all lost glories and grandeurs of Earth.” The Murfreesboro Sidelines reported: “The poems are of unearthly beauty. ... Whether the poems really are from the Atlantean or whether they are the creations of the poet Fryer, they deserve to be read and to be experienced.”

== 1970–2006: Solo performances ==
“Starting around 1970 or somewhat earlier” Sidney-Fryer wrote and performed one-man shows on literary topics. He gave his first performances in schools and libraries in San Francisco, then expanded to eventually perform his literary dramas more than 100 times across the United States and Great Britain in more than 50 universities as well as in libraries, bookstores and theaters. Sidney-Fryer's solo performances generated acclaim and coverage in newspapers and magazines.

“It's a new kind of dramatic literary art,” said Professor Celeste Turner Wright, University of California. “It is not a reading. It is not a play. Instead, this talented young performer becomes, temporarily, each of the characters described in his selections from Spenser's Faerie Queene.”

French editor and critic Philippe Gindre wrote: "These amazing performances derive equally from the courtly tradition and the commedia dell'arte: the performer does not read the selected texts, but recites them from memory and enacts them. Donald Sidney-Fryer's interest in the history of dance and choreography, in the same manner as the early music (he accompanies himself on the chitarrone), makes these performances unique."

Sidney-Fryer's desire to write and perform solo shows was “... instigated in particular by my desire to demonstrate something of Spenser's essence by dramatizing selected excerpts from his transcendent epic The Faerie Queene, chiefly parts of “The House of Pride” (Cantos IV and V of Book II) and above all the first half of Canto I of Book I. The latter turned into my most viable dramatization, because it forms a complete narrative or episode with a beginning, a middle, and an end—something comparatively rare in Spenser's epic." Another play, based on Cantos XI and XII of Book I of The Faerie Queene, was titled St. George and the Dragon and advertised as "The Greatest Fight of ALL Time!". Saint George became the most often performed of Sidney-Fryer's solo performances.

He toured England and Wales, performing there for three months ending in “early spring 1972.” After his British tour, he visited Ireland to see the ruins of Kilcolman Castle, where Spenser lived for ten years and where he had written The Faerie Queene.

Sidney-Fryer had a Renaissance-style bass lute (a chitarrone) custom made so he could incorporate music and songs into his performances. He turned “'Duandon,' a magical-musical-mystery tour de force (narrative) by George Sterling" into a performance, with success: "How did the audience respond overall? Gratifyingly, with thunderous clamor and loud applause mixed with hoots and hollers of approbation.”

His performance The Golden-Tongued Romantics: Romantic Poetry Past and Present enabled him to dramatize poetry from romantic poets from Spenser, Coleridge, Tennyson, and Swinburne through George Sterling, Clark Ashton Smith, and other California poets, ending with a few poems by Sidney-Fryer himself. He teamed with Fritz Leiber, Margo Skinner, G. Sutton Breiding, and Marie Boker in the joint performance California Romantics.

Sidney-Fryer's dramatic performances gave thousands of audience members a new appreciation of his literary heroes: Edmund Spenser, William Shakespeare, the English Romantic poets, and the California Romantic poets, especially Clark Ashton Smith and George Sterling.

== 1978–1990: Clark Ashton Smith scholarship ==
In mid-1975 Sidney-Fryer left San Francisco to move to the Oak Park neighborhood of Sacramento. He continued to research and write about Clark Ashton Smith, George Sterling, and other writers for a variety of publications, including seven papers for issues of the scholarly annual The Romantist between 1977 and 1986.

1979 Emperor of Dreams: A Clark Ashton Smith Bibliography by Donald Sidney-Fryer.

In 1978, Sidney-Fryer's bibliography of the writings of Clark Aston Smith was finally published. Sidney-Fryer titled the book Emperor of Dreams: A Clark Ashton Smith Bibliography after the opening line of Smith's most famous poem, “The Hashish-Eater”: “Bow down: I am the emperor of dreams.” Sidney-Fryer made Emperor of Dreams a treasury of information about Smith and his writings: "I purposed it as more than just a bibliography: It would also be a compendium of all kinds of information about C.A.S. . . ." He enlisted other writers to write about Smith, including Ray Bradbury, Stanton A. Coblentz, Avram Davidson, August Derleth, Harlan Ellison, Fritz Leiber, Sam Moskowitz, H. Warner Munn, E. Hoffmann Price, and more. Literary critic S. T. Joshi called Emperor of Dreams "a towering work of research," and Ashton Smith scholars David E. Schultz and Scott Connors considered Emperor of Dreams "The foundation upon which all Smith scholarship rests."

Clark Ashton Smith's widow Carol entrusted Sidney-Fryer's friend Robert A. “Rah” Hoffman with Smith's private literary notebook, used by the author from 1929 for more than thirty years until his death. Hoffman and Sidney-Fryer spent months deciphering Smith's handwriting and transcribing the text. Then they wrote introductory material and an index. Sidney-Fryer obtained supplementary material from poet Marvin R. Hiemstra and Smith's close friend George F. Haas. The resulting book, The Black Book of Clark Ashton Smith, was published by Arkham House in 1979. Although edited by Sidney-Fryer and Hoffman, for unknown reasons they are not credited as editors in the book itself. Smith expert Ron Hilger wrote: "One of the most important research tools available to the Smith scholar ... is The Black Book of Clark Ashton Smith."

1980 A Vision of Doom: Poems by Ambrose Bierce edited by Donald Sidney-Fryer.

A Vision of Doom: Poems by Ambrose Bierce, a collection of poems by Ambrose Bierce edited by Sidney-Fryer, was published in 1980 by Donald M. Grant, Publisher, Inc.

Next Sidney-Fryer edited three collections of Clark Ashton Smith short stories for publisher Pocket Books: The City of the Singing Flame (1981), The Last Incantation (1982), and The Monster of the Prophecy (1983). The Pocket Books collections were mass-market paperbacks of Smith's fiction, so by editing them Sidney-Fryer expanded Smith's audience to tens of thousands more readers than his prior publications.

In 1989, Greenwood Press published the anthology Strange Shadows: The Uncollected Fiction and Essays by Clark Ashton Smith. Sidney-Fryer edited the collection with Steve Behrends and Rah Hoffman. They persuaded author Robert Bloch to write an introduction.

In 1990, two more Smith-related books edited by Sidney-Fryer were published: The Devil's Notebook: Collected Epigrams and Pensées of Clark Ashton Smith and an annotated edition of Smith's best-known poem, The Hashish-Eater. In 1990 a third book edited by Sidney-Fryer was also published. As Green as Emeraude: The Collected Poems of Margo Skinner included an introduction in which Sidney-Fryer named Skinner as one of the California Romantics. (In 2008, a second edition of the annotated The Hashish-Eater was published that included an audio CD with Sidney-Fryer reciting that poem and others by Smith.)

== 1990–2013: poetry, nonfiction, and fiction ==
Sidney-Fryer had researched composer Cesare Pugni and the history of Romantic Ballet since the 1950s. In 1980 he started writing what he called his "magnum opus" of ballet history, The Case of the Light Fantastic Toe: The Romantic Ballet and Signor Maestro Cesare Pugni. During the 1990s Sidney-Fryer focused primarily on writing that project.

In August 1998 he moved from Sacramento to Los Angeles to share a home with his friend Rah Hoffman. While working on his ballet book, Sidney-Fryer continued to perform and to write smaller projects and poetry. He later wrote: "The fifteen years that I passed with Rah in [the Los Angeles suburb of] Westchester turned unexpectedly into the single happiest period in my life, and certainly the most productive."

While living in Los Angeles, Sidney-Fryer's next two books of poetry, Songs and Sonnets Atlantean: The Second Series and Songs and Sonnets Atlantean: The Third Series, were published. All known critical evaluations of The Second Series were favorable. Literary historian S. T. Joshi stated: “This remarkable collection of poems and prose poems displays Sidney-Fryer as an assured master of many poetic forms—the quatrain, the sonnet, the ode, and especially the alexandrine, which has become his signature metre—as well as a fantastic imagination that, to be sure, draws upon the work of [Clark Ashton] Smith, [Ambrose] Bierce, and the Elizabethans but remains distinctively his own. … It displays all the virtues we have come to expect from Sidney-Fryer: felicitous word-choice, precision in metre, and especially a vibrant, exotic imagination that vivifies realms of fantasy into living realities."

In England, novelist Brian Stableford summarized the book's contents: “The metafictional stratification of the whole body of work is fascinating in its depth and complexity, moving from the bedrock of a beautifully ornate version of the legendary Atlantis through the Elizabethan fabulations of Edmund Spenser, the neo-paganism of the French Parnassians and the unrepentant fantasizing of the American Bohemians of the West Coast, to a fresh and deftly-stylized present day. Such scope is rare; coherence of vision and supple exploitation of exotic methods within such scope is even rarer. The accomplished dexterity with which so many innovative links are forged and sewn is remarkable, and the whole tapestry is a brilliant achievement.

Songs and Sonnets Atlantean: The Third Series was published by Phosphor Lantern Press, Sidney-Fryer's own publishing company. He named his company after a line in a poem by Clark Ashton Smith:

Our phosphor lamps may serve as well as any
Along the rutted roads to Charon's wharf.

In 2004, Sidney-Fryer's translation from French of fantasy prose poems by Aloysius Bertrand, Gaspard de la Nuit: Fantasies in the Manner of Rembrandt and Callot, was published. The Los Angeles Times declared: "The book is nothing less than an antidote for a flagging imagination, with words that are, in Bertrand's words, transporting … What is written here did not come easily: it has the ring of deep ore. There is not a hollow phrase throughout." Gahan Wilson wrote: "I am very grateful to Fryer, very grateful indeed, for it is a marvelous work that I have very much enjoyed reading and intend to read and study many times again now that it has been put within my grasp." Critic Jesse F. Knight said: "Donald Sidney-Fryer has done a brilliant job of translating this text; he also provides a meticulous look at the life of Bertrand, as well as of his work." Literary historian Scott Connors wrote: "Donald Sidney-Fryer has provided a scintillating and accessible translation of this monument to French Romanticism that puts on display its affinities for the fantastic, the grotesque, and the medieval." Publisher Tartarus Press released the book in England. British author Brian Stableford said: "Sidney-Fryer, the last surviving member of the Californian neo-Romantic school centered on George Sterling, is perfectly qualified to adapt the work of a key member of the French Romantic school …"

On April 29, 2005, Sidney-Fryer visited New Bedford, Massachusetts--where he had spent his childhood and youth--for the first time in about forty years. He had used his memories of the whaling port to describe his fictional Atlantis. Seeing New Bedford's "centuried magick and historic charm" enchanted him.

In 2008, New York publisher Hippocampus Press released all three volumes of Songs and Sonnets Atlantean combined into one book: The Atlantis Fragments: The Trilogy of the Songs and Sonnets Atlantean. Over the next several years, Hippocampus published a steady stream of books by Sidney-Fryer, becoming his most frequent publisher.

With his friend Alan Gullette, Sidney-Fryer edited The Outer Gate: The Collected Poems of Nora May French. In addition to being the most complete collection of French's poems, Sidney-Fryer wrote a 56-page introduction providing extensive biographical information from Sidney-Fryer's years-long friendship with Helen French Hunt, Nora May's sister. Dana Gioia, former chairman of the National Endowment for the Arts, called The Outer Gate "a major addition to the study of California literature."

British publisher Stanza in 2010 produced Not Quite Atlantis, a collection of Sidney-Fryer's poems but for one exception not framed as surviving the collapse of the lost continent Atlantis. Most were translations by Sidney-Fryer from French poets or were poems Sidney-Fryer wrote to individual people, including Edmund Spenser, Clark Ashton Smith, George Sterling, August Derleth, Algernon Charles Swinburne, Ambrose Bierce, and other writers and friends.

In 2011 Sidney-Fryer self-published (under his Phosphor Lantern Press) The Golden State Phantastics: The California Romantics and Related Subjects, an anthology collecting 33 of his literary essays and reviews from the 1960s through the 2000s, plus one new essay about Nora May French and a new foreword. Sidney-Fryer's goal for this book was "defining in critical terms the survival of not just the Late Romanticism from the 1800s but also the Modern Romanticism of the 1900s on into the twenty-first century." The book has been frequently cited by other authors writing about California history, literature, and writers. It was successful enough for Hippocampus Press to issue a second edition the next year.

Also that year Sidney-Fryer self-published The Atlantis Fragments: A Novel, a companion to this Songs and Sonnets Atlantean Trilogy. In 2012, Hippocampus Press published a second edition of the novel.

Hoffman died in February 2013. Sidney-Fryer moved back to Sacramento in June 2013.

== 2014–2026: Autobiography and ballet history ==
After spending most of his life living with other people, Sidney-Fryer found he did not like living by himself. In February 2014, he moved from Sacramento to North Auburn, California to share a home with friends. While living there, he self-published the book West of Wherevermore and Other Travel Writings from his own Phosphor Lantern Press in 2016. It included his novel West of Wherevermore: Interlude in Atlantis and four travel essays. That same year, Hippocampus Press published Sidney-Fryer's Hobgoblin Apollo: The Autobiography of Donald Sidney-Fryer. Sidney-Fryer had continued to write poetry throughout the past years, but books of poems rarely sell enough to be published. He came up with the idea of including poetry books at the end of his other volumes. He added Odds and Ends, a 100-page collection of new poems, as an appendix to Hobgoblin Apollo. After that, Sidney-Fryer included poetry sections as the conclusions of most of his books, producing the equivalent of six additional books of poems.

Sometime after 2016, Sidney-Fryer returned to his New England roots, moving into Liberty Commons, a senior living complex in North Chatham, Massachusetts.

In 2018, working with his friend Alan Gullette, Sidney-Fryer self-published his massive history of Romantic Ballet and biography of composer-conductor Cesare Pugni, The Case of the Light Fantastic Toe: The Romantic Ballet and Signor Maestro Cesare Pugni, as Well as Their Survival by Means of Tsarist Russia. The five-volume work (plus a sixth volume with its index) was well-reviewed. Dance critic Joan Acocella of the New Yorker wrote: "Donald Sidney-Fryer's book, researched with a heroic thoroughness, is truly a boon to ballet history." Dance historian Lynn Garafola said: "Meticulously researched, Donald Sidney-Fryer's study sheds light not only on ballet and musical practices of the age, but also on the day-to-day struggles of a composer who lived outside the musical limelight."

From 2017 through 2023, Hippocampus Press published three more volumes of Sidney-Fryer's essays, each concluding with a large section of his poems. Sidney-Fryer's verse is marked by a strong imagination and a Francophilic focus. He is a strong believer in "pure poetry," and practices formalist verse, having developing his own specific poetic form: the 'Spenserian stanza-sonnet'.

In 2020, Hippocampus Press also published his novel A King Called Arthor and Other Moreceaux, "a radical retelling of the King Arthur story, but based on the historical Dux Bellum of the fifth century A.D., and thus minus the trappings of myth and legend that accrued in the later middle ages..." The volume also includes 21 additional essays by Sidney-Fryer (among them his 100-page "Arthur Machen and King Arthur: Sovereigns of Dream"), a selection of poems titled "A Final Laurel Wreath of Lyrics," and two essays by other poets about Clark Ashton Smith.

== Illness and death ==
In May 2025, Sidney-Fryer suffered a stroke which necessitated his move to a nursing home. In a few months he recovered sufficiently to return to the senior living community, but was diagnosed with bone cancer in one of his legs. An amputation was scheduled, but halted when doctors discovered the cancer had metastasized throughout his body. In late 2025 he was placed in palliative care. He died in Chatham, Massachusetts, on May 2, 2026, at the age of 91.

== Donald Sidney-Fryer Fellowship ==
The Bancroft Library at the University of California, Berkeley awards an annual Donald Sidney-Fryer Fellowship to underwrite "scholarly use of primary source materials at The Bancroft Library related to the works of writers, poets, artists and their community collectively referred to as the West Coast Romantics. Notable members of this group, located in Northern California, include Ambrose Bierce, Jack London, Robinson Jeffers, Mary Austin, George Sterling, Clark Ashton Smith, Nora May French, Henry Lafler, James Marie Hopper, Gelett Burgess, Sinclair Lewis, and Xavier Martinez."

== Bibliography ==
Note that Sidney-Fryer's two similarly-titled books West of Wherevermore and Other Travel Writings (Auburn, California: Phosphor Lantern Press, 2016; 222 pages) and West of Wherevermore and Other Essays (New York: Hippocampus Press, 2019; 254 pages) are (except for four travel essays which appear in both volumes) completely different books.

=== Poetry ===
- Songs and Sonnets Atlantean (Sauk City, WI: Arkham House, 1971).
- Songs and Sonnets Atlantean: The Second Series (Holicong, PA: Wildside Press, 2003).
- Songs and Sonnets Atlantean: The Third Series (Los Angeles: Phosphor Lantern Press, 2005).
- The Atlantis Fragments: The Trilogy of the Songs and Sonnets Atlantean (New York: Hippocampus Press, 2008) Omnibus edition of the three volumes of Songs and Sonnets Atlantean.
- Not Quite Atlantis: A Selection of Poems, (Hornsea, England: StanZa Press, 2010).

=== Fiction and poetry ===
- Astral Debris: A Quiddity in Prose and Poetry (New York: Hippocampus Press, 2023). Includes 75-page short comic novel Star Drek: A New Series, about an interstellar garbage scow and the starship Enterprise, plus 119 pages of poems.

=== Nonfiction and poetry ===
- Hobgoblin Apollo: The Autobiography of Donald Sidney-Fryer (New York: Hippocampus Press, 2016). ISBN 978-1-61498-167-1. Includes a 270-page autobiography and 102 pages of poetry.
- Aesthetics Ho! Essays on Art, Literature, and Theatre (New York: Hippocampus Press, 2017). ISBN 978-1-61498-201-2. Includes 85 pages of poetry and fifteen essays on Clark Ashton Smith; George Sterling; artist Jesse Allen; Kevin Starr; ballet history; H. P. Lovecraft; Hollywood films of the 1930s, 1940s, and 1950s; Sidney-Fryer's interactions with Hollywood figures when he lived in Los Angeles; and writing his own poetry and Songs and Sonnets Atlantean.
- West of Wherevermore and Other Essays (New York: Hippocampus Press, 2019). Includes four travel essays, eight literary essays (including one on George Sterling), and 67 pages of poetry.

=== Fiction, nonfiction, and poetry ===
- Random Notes, Random Lines: Essays and Miscellanea (New York: Hippocampus Press, 2021). Includes 97 pages of poems, two short stories, and 22 reviews and essays about Clark Ashton Smith, George Sterling, Robert E. Howard, Gaspard de la Nuit, Songs and Sonnets Atlantean, The Case of the Light Fantastic Toe, and Sidney-Fryer writing and performing his own verse dramas.
- A King Called Arthor and Other Morceaux (New York: Hippocampus Press, 2020). ISBN 978-1-61498-294-4. Contains 107-page novel A King Called Arthor: A Chronicle, 20 pages of poetry, and 21 essays on Robert E. Howard, Clark Ashton Smith, H. P. Lovecraft, Fritz Leiber, Ashley Dioses, G. Sutton Breiding, D. L. Myers, "Arthur Machen and King Arthur", and Sidney-Fryer's own life and career.
- Etcetera atque Etcetera: Another Quiddity in Prose and Poetry (New York: Hippocampus Press, forthcoming in 2026). ISBN 978-1-61498-493-1. Science fiction, poems, plus nonfiction about Clark Ashton Smith, Samuel Loveman, George Sterling, August Derleth, Fritz Leiber, and boys' books of the early twentieth century.

=== Fiction ===
- The Atlantis Fragments: The Novel first edition (Los Angeles: Phosphor Lantern Press, 2011); second edition (New York: Hippocampus Press, 2012).

=== Fiction and nonfiction ===
- West of Wherevermore and Other Travel Writings (Auburn, California: Phosphor Lantern Press, 2016). Contains 108-page novel West of Wherevermore: Interlude in Atlantis and four travel essays.

=== Nonfiction ===
- A Checklist of the Ballet Scores of Cesare Pugni self-published; reprinted in Enciclopedia dello Spettacolo, vol. 8, (Rome: Casa Editrice Le Maschere, 1961), pp. 587-589.
- The Last of the Great Romantic Poets (Albuquerque, NM: Silver Scarab Press, 1973). On Clark Ashton Smith.
- Emperor of Dreams: A Clark Ashton Smith Bibliography (West Kingston, RI: Donald M. Grant, 1978).
- Clark Ashton Smith: The Sorcerer Departs (West Hills, CA : Tsathoggua Press, 1997).
- The Sorcerer Departs: Clark Ashton Smith (1893–1961) (Dole, France: Silver Key Press, 2007).
  - French translation of The Sorcerer Departs audiobook
- The Golden State Phantasticks: The California Romantics and Related Subjects first edition (Los Angeles: Phosphor Lantern Press, 2011); second edition (New York: Hippocampus Press, 2012).
- The Case of the Light Fantastic Toe: The Romantic Ballet and Signor Maestro Cesare Pugni, as Well as Their Survival by Means of Tsarist Russia [5 volumes plus index volume] (Los Angeles: Phosphor Lantern Press, 2018).

=== Translation ===
- Gaspard de la Nuit: Fantasies in the manner of Rembrandt and Callot by Aloysius Bertrand (Encino, CA: Black Coat Press, 2004).

=== Anthologies edited ===
- Poems in Prose by Clark Ashton Smith (Sauk City, WI: Arkham House, 1965).
- Other Dimensions by Clark Ashton Smith (Sauk City, WI: Arkham House, 1970).
- The Black Book of Clark Ashton Smith (Sauk City, WI: Arkham House, 1979).
- A Vision of Doom by Ambrose Bierce (West Kingston, RI: Donald M. Grant, 1980).
- The City of the Singing Flame by Clark Ashton Smith (New York: Pocket/Timescape, 1981).
- The Last Incantation by Clark Ashton Smith (New York: Pocket/Timescape, 1982).
- The Monster of the Prophecy by Clark Ashton Smith (New York: Pocket/Timescape, 1983).
- (with Steve Behrends and Rah Hoffman) Strange Shadows: The Uncollected Fiction & Essays of Clark Ashton Smith (New York: Greenwood Press, 1989).
- (with Don Herron) The Devil's Notebook: Collected Epigrams and Pensées of Clark Ashton Smith (Mercer Island, WA: Starmont House, Inc., 1990).
- As Green as Emeraude: The Collected Poems of Margo Skinner by Margo Skinner (Glen Ellen: Dawn Heron Press, 1990).
- The Hashish-Eater by Clark Ashton Smith (annotated); first edition (Sacramento: privately issued, 1990); second edition with audio CD (New York: Hippocampus Press, 2008).
- with Alan Gullette: The Outer Gate: The Collected Poems of Nora May French (New York: Hippocampus Press, 2009).
- with Ron Hilger: The Averoigne Chronicles by Clark Ashton Smith. (Lakewood, Colorado: Centipede Press, 2016).

== Bibliography of plays ==
Sidney-Fryer wrote and performed most of his solo dramatic performances during the 1970s and 1980s. This list of his one-man plays was compiled from references to them in newspapers, magazines, and Sidney-Fryer's own writings, especially his autobiography, Hobgoblin Apollo, and "The Spenser Experiment", his 1976 detailed recounting of creating and performing his first solo dramas. Plays are arranged in chronological order with the years and places of their first known performance.

- title unknown (circa 1970, San Francisco) Half-hour dramatization based on the first half of Canto I of Book I of The Faerie Queene by Edmund Spenser. Sidney-Fryer called it “my most viable dramatization, because it forms a complete narrative or episode with a beginning, a middle, and an end—something comparatively rare in Spenser's epic.”
- The House of Pride (circa 1970, San Francisco) A two-hour show based on Cantos IV and V of Book II of The Faerie Queene.
- In This the Reign of Elizabeth II (1971, San Francisco) Performances of “excerpts from Spencer and Shakespeare.”
- title unknown (1972, San Francisco) “Developed a two-hour performance with “the first hour consisting of Spenser (excerpts from Cantos I, IV, and V of Book I [of The Faerie Queene]), and the second hour consisting of the California Romantics, ending with myself as the last and nominally modern representative.”
- title unknown (1972, New Ash Green, Kent, England) Entire Proem of Book II of The Faerie Queene followed by poems from California Romantics.
- St. George and the Dragon (1973, San Francisco) “... a two-hour dramatization (with intermission, of course) of Cantos XI and XII, those that end Book I” of The Faerie Queene.
- title unknown (1974, San Francisco) On the poetry of George Sterling.
- title unknown (1975 or 1976, Sacramento) At the Playwrights’ Theatre: “First, I performed the first half of Canto I of Book I from The Faerie Queene ...; this occupied the first half-hour. Then I performed “Duandon,” a magical-musical-mystery tour de force (narrative) by George Sterling; this occupied the second half-hour. ... How did the audience respond overall? Gratifyingly, with thunderous clamor and loud applause mixed with hoots and hollers of approbation.”
- The Golden-Tongued Romantics: Romantic Poetry Past and Present (1976, Murfreesboro, Tennessee) Dramatization of poems by Edmund Spenser and romantic poets from Coleridge, Tennyson, Swinburne through California Romantics such as George Sterling and Clark Ashton Smith,
- Ringing the Changes (1982, Sacramento) “I gave a special dramatization of the complete ‘Mutabilitie’ Cantos (VI and VII), the sole surviving fragment of Book VII [of The Faerie Queene], and under the legend of ‘Constancy.’ It takes a couple of hours to perform this dramatization.” Sometimes titled The Mutabilitie Cantoes.
- An Elizabethan Hour (1984, Sacramento) Content unknown.
- title unknown (2006, Sacramento) On the poetry of Clark Ashton Smith.
- Four Fables by Clark Ashton Smith (2006, Sacramento).

In addition to these solo plays, Sidney-Fryer wrote the group drama California Romantics, which was performed in 1982 in San Francisco by Sidney-Fryer, Fritz Leiber, Margo Skinner, G. Sutton Breiding, and Marie Boker.

== Discography ==
The Hashish-Eater and Other Poems by Clark Ashton Smith read by Donald Sidney-Fryer, music by Graham Plowman (Minneapolis: Fedogan & Bremer, 2018).

== Videos ==
- Donald Sidney-Fryer on the poetry of Robert E. Howard. (2009).
- The Poetry of Robert E. Howard Panel Filmed by Ben Friberg. (2009).
- Visions and Affiliations. (December 8, 2012).
- Clark Ashton Smith. Filmed by Darin Coelho Spring at Beers Books in Sacramento (October 18, 2015).
- “To Clark Ashton Smith” by Donald Sidney-Fryer. Video by Darin Coelho Spring. (January 13, 2018).
- Clark Ashton Smith: The Emperor of Dreams Official Preview (2018).
- Ron Hilger and Donald Sidney-Fryer at Crater Ridge. (February 26, 2019).
- Arts Alliance Meet the Authors Donald Sidney Fryer and J. J. Cunis. (November 8, 2019).

== See also ==
- "A Wine of Wizardry"
