= Nebula Awards 28 =

1994 anthology edited by James Morrow

- Cover of first edition
- Editor: James Morrow
- Cover artist: Craig Rosenberg
- Language: English
- Series: Nebula Awards
- Genre: Science fiction
- Publisher: Harcourt Brace
- Publication date: 1994
- Publication place: United States
- Media type: Print (hardcover)
- Pages: xiii, 329 pp.
- ISBN: 0-15-100082-4
- Preceded by: Nebula Awards 27
- Followed by: Nebula Awards 29

Nebula Awards 28 is an anthology of award winning science fiction short works edited by James Morrow, the third of three successive volumes under his editorship. It was first published in hardcover and trade paperback by Harcourt Brace in April 1994. The book has also been translated into Polish.

== Summary ==
The book collects pieces that won or were nominated for the Nebula Awards for novella, novelette and short story for the year 1993, various nonfiction pieces related to the awards, and tributes to recently deceased author Fritz Leiber, together with one of the two Rhysling Award-winning poems for 1992 and an introduction by the editor. Not all nominees for the various awards are included.

== Contents ==
- "Introduction" (James Morrow)
- "Is Science Fiction Out to Lunch? Some Thoughts on the Year 1992" [essay] (John Clute)
- "Even the Queen" [Best Short Story winner] (Connie Willis)
- "Danny Goes to Mars" [Best Novelette winner] (Pamela Sargent)
- "Matter's End" [Best Novelette nominee] (Gregory Benford)
- "In Memoriam: Fritz Leiber" [essay] (James Morrow)
- "Gentleman Fritz" [essay] (Poul Anderson)
- "Doing It Right" [essay] (David Hartwell)
- "A World Without Fritz" [essay] (Stephen King)
- "Let There Be Fandom" [essay] (Frederik Pohl)
- "The July Ward" [Best Novelette nominee] (S. N. Dyer)
- "Lennon Spex" [Best Short Story nominee] (Paul Di Filippo)
- "The Mountain to Mohammed" [Best Short Story nominee] (Nancy Kress)
- "Hopeful Monsters: The SF and Fantasy Films of 1992" [essay] (Nick Lowe)
- "Song of the Martian Cricket" [Rhysling Award winner - Short Poem] (David Lunde)
- "Vinland the Dream" [Best Short Story nominee] (Kim Stanley Robinson)
- "Life Regarded as a Jigsaw Puzzle of Highly Lustrous Cats" [Best Short Story nominee] (Michael Bishop)
- "City of Truth" [Best Novella winner] (James Morrow)

== Reception ==
Tom Easton in Analog Science Fiction and Fact takes issue with the editor's assertion "that most of the fiction here says something about the nature of science," observing "both that a great deal of SF has always dealt with the nature of science and that Morrow stretches a bit to find profundity in some of the stories." Regardless, he writes "the book offers an excellent overview of 1992" and "[e]very school and town library in the country (and beyond) should have this series. So should everyone who wants to keep up with the field." After briefly listing the fiction and verse content, he notes that Lowe and Clute in their overviews of the year's genre films and novels in the genre "[b]oth seem impatient for SF to get about the task of reinventing itself. He also notes the three memorials to Fritz Leiber and Pohl's "glimpse of fandom's early days," excerpted from his 1979 autobiography The Way the Future Was.

The anthology was also reviewed by Russell Letson in Locus no. 401, June 1994, Don D'Ammassa in Science Fiction Chronicle no. 175, August 1994, and no. 177, October 1994, and Kevin G. Helfenbein in The New York Review of Science Fiction, September 1994.

== Awards ==
The book placed eleventh in the 1995 Locus Poll Award for Best Anthology.
