= Nebula Awards 23 =

1989 anthology edited by Michael Bishop

- Cover of first edition
- Editor: Michael Bishop
- Cover artist: Vaughn Andrews and Paul Silverman
- Language: English
- Series: Nebula Awards
- Genre: Science fiction
- Publisher: Harcourt Brace Jovanovich
- Publication date: 1989
- Publication place: United States
- Media type: Print (hardcover)
- Pages: x, 370
- ISBN: 978-0-15-164930-3
- OCLC: 19844615
- Dewey Decimal: 808.3
- LC Class: PS648.S3 N48 1989
- Preceded by: Nebula Awards 22
- Followed by: Nebula Awards 24

Nebula Awards 23 is an anthology of award winning science fiction short works edited by Michael Bishop, the first of three successive volumes under his editorship. It was first published in hardcover and trade paperback by Harcourt Brace Jovanovich in April 1989.

== Summary ==
The book collects pieces that won or were nominated for the Nebula Awards for novella, novelette and short story for the year 1988 and various nonfiction pieces related to the awards, together with a tribute to 1988 Grand Master award winner and recently decreased author Alfred Bester, the three Rhysling Award-winning poems for 1987, a couple other pieces, and an introduction by the editor. Not all nominees for the various awards are included.

== Contents ==
- "Introduction" (Michael Bishop)
- "The World Renews Itself: A View on the SF and Fantasy of 1987" [essay] (Ian Watson)
- "In Memoriam: Alfred Bester 1913 1987" [essay] (Isaac Asimov)
- "Forever Yours, Anna" [Best Short Story winner, 1988] (Kate Wilhelm)
- "Flowers of Edo" [Best Novelette nominee, 1988] (Bruce Sterling)
- "Schwarzschild Radius" Best Novelette nominee, 1988 (Connie Willis)
- "Witness" [Best Novella nominee, 1988] (Walter Jon Williams)
- "Judgment Call" [novelette] (John Kessel)
- "The Glassblower's Dragon" [short story] (Lucius Shepard)
- "Rachel in Love" [Best Novelette winner, 1988] (Pat Murphy)
- "Rhysling Poetry Award Winners" [essay] (Michael Bishop)
- "Before the Big Bang: News from the Hubble Large Space Telescope" [Rhysling Award, Best Short Poem co-winner, 1987] (Jonathan V. Post)
- "A Dream of Heredity" [Rhysling Award, Best Short Poem co-winner, 1987] (John Calvin Rezmerski)
- "Daedalus" [Rhysling Award, Best Long Poem winner, 1987] (W. Gregory Stewart)
- "Angel" [Best Short Story nominee, 1988] (Pat Cadigan)
- "Freezeframe" [short story] (Gregory Benford)
- "The Blind Geometer" [Best Novella winner, 1988] (Kim Stanley Robinson)
- "Spelling God with the Wrong Blocks" [short story] (James Morrow)
- "DX" [poem] (Joe Haldeman)
- "Science Fiction Movies of 1987" [essay] (Bill Warren)
- "About the Nebula Award" [essay] (Michael Bishop)
- "Past Nebula Award Winners"

== Reception ==
Kirkus Reviews called the anthology "[s]olid and dependable overall, measuring up to the high standards set in previous years." Singled out as "the most noteworthy entries" are the pieces by Kate Wilhelm, Bruce Sterling, Gregory Benford, Kim Stanley Robinson, and James Morrow.

== Awards ==
The book placed thirteenth in the 1990 Locus Poll Award for Best Anthology.
