= Nebula Awards 20 =

1985 anthology edited by George Zebrowski

- Cover of first edition
- Author: edited by George Zebrowski
- Cover artist: Lee Merrill, H. Wendler
- Language: English
- Series: Nebula Awards
- Genre: Science fiction short stories
- Publisher: Harcourt Brace Jovanovich
- Publication date: 1985
- Publication place: United States
- Media type: Print (hardcover)
- Pages: xi, 372 pp.
- ISBN: 0-15-164927-8
- Preceded by: The Nebula Awards #19
- Followed by: Nebula Awards 21

Nebula Awards 20 is an anthology of award winning science fiction short works edited by George Zebrowski. It was first published in hardcover and trade paperback by Harcourt Brace Jovanovich in November 1985.

== Summary ==
The book collects pieces that won or were nominated for the Nebula Awards for novella, novelette and short story for the year 1985 and various nonfiction pieces related to the awards, together with the two Rhysling Award-winning poems for 1984, a couple other pieces, and an introduction by the editor. Not all nominees for the various awards are included.

== Contents ==
- "Introduction" (George Zebrowski)
- "1984 or Against" [essay] (Algis Budrys)
- "Bloodchild" [Best Novelette winner, 1985] (Octavia E. Butler)
- "The Man Who Painted the Dragon Griaule" [Best Novelette nominee, 1985] (Lucius Shepard)
- "Press Enter []" [Best Novella winner, 1985] (John Varley)
- "New Rose Hotel" [short story] (William Gibson)
- "The Greening of Bed-Stuy" [Best Novella nominee, 1985] (Frederik Pohl)
- "The Lucky Strike" [Best Novelette nominee, 1985] (Kim Stanley Robinson)
- "Morning Child" [Best Short Story winner, 1985] (Gardner Dozois)
- "The Aliens Who Knew, I Mean, Everything" [Best Short Story nominee, 1985] (George Alec Effinger)
- "A Cabin in the Coast" [Best Short Story nominee, 1985] (Gene Wolfe)
- "Dogs' Lives" [novelette] (Michael Bishop)
- "The Eichmann Variations" [Best Short Story nominee, 1985] (George Zebrowski)
- "Love Song to Lucy / Lucy Answers Back" [Rhysling Award, Short Poem winner, 1984] (Helen Ehrlich)
- "Saul's Death" [Rhysling Award, Long Poem winner, 1984] (Joe Haldeman)
- "Science Fiction Films of 1984" [essay] (Bill Warren)
- "SFWA, the Guild" [essay] (Norman Spinrad)

== Reception ==
Sue Martin in the Los Angeles Times writes that reading the book "is like settling down with a box of the best chocolates: everyone a tasty surprise. Some, of course, more appealing than others." She notes that in addition to the Nebula winners it also includes "several of the runners-up, which succinctly points out what a tight, quality pack these finalists are." Highlighted are the pieces by Varley, "a brilliant tale of computer skulduggery and mystery," Robinson, "really gripping," Butler, also gripping, and "creepy." Others "didn't do much for me," especially the pieces by Gibson, "written a little too coyly: all style and not enough story for my taste," and Bishop, "bits and puppy dogs' tails of stories that never coalesced for me." Still, in summation she pronounces "let it just be said that if you seek the best in quality and diversity: Look no further."

The anthology was also reviewed by Michael M. Levy in Fantasy Review, February 1986, Elton T. Elliott in Science Fiction Review, Spring 1986, The Christian Science Monitor v. 78, May 16, 1986, Andrew Andrews in Science Fiction Review, Summer 1986, E. F. Bleiler in Rod Serling's The Twilight Zone Magazine, June 1986, Algis Budrys in The Magazine of Fantasy & Science Fiction, July 1986, and Don D'Ammassa in Science Fiction Chronicle no. 82, July 1986.

== Awards ==
The book placed eighteenth in the 1986 Locus Poll Award for Best Anthology.
