= The Black Book of Clark Ashton Smith =

- cover by Andrew Smith of The Black Book of Clark Ashton Smith
- Editors: Donald Sidney-Fryer and Robert A. "Rah" Hoffman (uncredited)
- Author: Clark Ashton Smith
- Illustrator: Andrew Smith
- Cover artist: Andrew Smith
- Language: English
- Subject: Notebook, memoir
- Publisher: Arkham House
- Publication date: 1979
- Publication place: United States
- Media type: Print (Paperback)
- Pages: xv, 141
- ISBN: 0-87054-087-4
- OCLC: 6303502
- Dewey Decimal: 813/.52
- LC Class: PS3537.M335 B5

The Black Book of Clark Ashton Smith is Donald Sidney-Fryer and "Rah" Hoffmann's transcription of author Clark Ashton Smith's own literary notebook, used from 1929 for more than thirty years until Smith's death in 1961. "This notebook contains plot ideas, bits of poetry in various states of completion, lists of fantastic names and titles of stories, both used and unused. The items in the Black Book have been carefully reproduced in the exact order in which they appeared in Smith's original notebook and each item has been numbered to aid in location and comparison, By comparing plot ideas with their corresponding finished tales, or first drafts of poems against the final versions, it is possible to gain insights into the creative process demonstrated by Smith."

== Creation and publication ==
Donald Sidney-Fryer learned about Clark Ashton Smith's black notebook from Smith himself, at the author's home in Pacific Grove, California:

During my last visit to Smith [in 1959], he had shown me the notebook he had used since about 1929, The Black Book, and hence during the years of his intensive fictioneering, 1929-1937. He had read to me a number of plot-sketches, including "The Doom of Azedarac" and "The Oracle of Sadoqua". These were tales of Averoigne, his mythical province in medieval France. I instantly realized the great value of this notebook to dedicated students of Smith's writings, and in March or April of 1961 I sent a money-order of $25 to the author, asking him to have a microfilm made of The Black Book in order to insure the preservation of this valuable material. For some reason he could not agree to this."

After Smith’s death in 1961, his widow Carol entrusted Robert A. “Rah” Hoffman with Smith’s black notebook. Hoffman and his friend Donald Sidney-Fryer spent months (October 14, 1961 - March 1962) deciphering Smith’s handwriting, transcribing the text, and proofreading. Then Sidney-Fryer wrote introductory material and an index and gathered supplementary material by poet Marvin R. Hiemstra and Smith’s close friend George F. Haas. "Preparing my own edition of The Black Book proved more difficult than I had thought possible", Sidney-Fryer wrote. "I became so conscious of trying not to make errors that I almost drove myself, unwittingly, to a nervous breakdown."

The book was published in 1979 by Arkham House in an edition of 2,588 copies. Although edited by Sidney-Fryer and Hoffman, for unknown reasons they are not credited as editors in the book itself.

== Critical response ==
Smith expert Ron Hilger wrote: "One of the most important research tools available to the Smith scholar (along with Donald Sidney-Fryer's excellent bibliography Emperor of Dreams) is The Black Book of Clark Ashton Smith."

== Contents ==
The Black Book of Clark Ashton Smith contains the following:

1. "Foreword", by Marvin R. Hiemstra
2. The Black Book of Clark Ashton Smith
  - "A Note on the Text"
  - "Explanation of Editorial Devices"
  - "Index by Title"
  - "The Black Book of Clark Ashton Smith"
  - "Excerpts from The Black Book"
  - "Appendix of Finished Poems"
    - "Song of the Necromancer"
    - "Dominium in Excelsis"
    - "Shapes in the Sunset"
    - "Don Quixote on Market Street"
    - "Soliloquy in an Ebon Tower"
    - "The Isle of Saturn"
    - "The Centaur"
    - "Ye Shall Return"
    - "Thebaid"
  - "Appendix of Published Epigrams and Pensées"
3. Two Memoirs of Smith by George F. Haas
  - "As I Remember Klarkash-ton"
  - "Memories of Klarkash-ton"

== See also ==
- Clark Ashton Smith bibliography

== Sources ==
- Jaffery, Sheldon (1989). The Arkham House Companion. Mercer Island, WA: Starmont House, Inc. p. 122. ISBN 1-55742-005-X.
- Chalker, Jack L.; Mark Owings (1998). The Science-Fantasy Publishers: A Bibliographic History, 1923-1998. Westminster, MD and Baltimore: Mirage Press, Ltd. p. 53.
- Joshi, S.T. (1999). Sixty Years of Arkham House: A History and Bibliography. Sauk City, WI: Arkham House. pp. 144–145. ISBN 0-87054-176-5.
- Nielsen, Leon (2004). Arkham House Books: A Collector's Guide. Jefferson, NC and London: McFarland & Company, Inc. pp. 125–126. ISBN 0-7864-1785-4.
