= The July Ward =

1991 ghost story by S. N. Dyer

- Short story by S. N. Dyer
- Country: United States
- Language: English
- Genres: Ghost story, Fantasy

Publication
- Published in: Isaac Asimov's Science Fiction Magazine
- Publication date: April 1991

"The July Ward" is a short ghost story by the physician S. N. Dyer, first published in the April 1991 issue of Isaac Asimov's Science Fiction Magazine. The story was nominated for the 1992 Nebula Award for Best Novella. It has since been reprinted in various anthologies.

== Synopsis ==
The story follows Dr. Watson, a female hospitalist, over a day in an urban medical center. John Doe #3, an unnamed victim of drug violence, arrives brain dead where Watson, Tom her medical student, and the rest of her medical team inspect the comatose body. The team determines that the body must be kept on a ventilator until the next of kin can be contacted. In the meantime, a transplant surgeon suggests that they should harvest the body's organs before contacting the family.

Soon, another patient arrives, left paraplegic from another incident of gang violence. The patient warns that the opposing gang will be coming into the hospital to get him. A family member of John Doe #3 has been contacted and they refuse to allow the organs to be donated. Soon after, John Doe #3 dies from complications and the surgeon berates Tom. The situation overwhelms Tom, causing him to feel guilty for the patient's death.

Dr. Watson realizes Tom is about to make a foolish decision and follows him down into the depths of the hospital cellars to stop him from entering a door labelled "The July Ward". She insists John Doe #3's death was not his fault and that the surgeon was overly accusatory. Watson tells Tom about her own mistake and the patient who died because she failed to recognize a case of rhabdomyolysis. Tom and Dr. Watson return to the hospital floors.

Two gunmen soon arrive to assassinate the paraplegic patient, throwing the hospital into havoc. Dr. Watson escapes the ward and the two men follow her back into the hospital's underground floors. They chase her through rooms with preserved body parts and specimens until she turns and enters the door labelled "The July Ward".

In this ghostly ward, orderlies attend to neat and clean rows of patients in beds. Dr. Watson stops to visit the first patient she killed, apologizes once more, then compliments the healthcare workers. The two gunmen are apprehended by the ghost staff and Dr. Watson recalls that "only two kinds of people may enter the July Ward— doctors, and the dead. And only the doctors may leave."

== Themes ==
"The July Ward" draws on traditional Gothic imagery that "mixes medical technology with the classic ghost story."

The title is a reference to the July effect, a controversial observation that most hospital observe a spike in patient deaths when newly graduated physicians begin their residency.

== Reception ==
Mark Pitcavage at The Washington Post wrote: "S.N. Dyer's "The July Ward" is a moving account of the guilt physicians feel over preventable deaths." The story, "deals poignantly and chillingly with the issue of doctors' fallibility." wrote James Morrow in the introduction to Nebula Awards 28. The editors of Isaac Asimov's Ghosts, Gardner Dozois and Sheila Williams, describe the story as "harrowing and profoundly disturbing."

== Reprint ==
The story appeared in several subsequent anthologies, including Isaac Asimov's Ghosts in 1995 and A Women's Liberation, edited by Sheila Williams and Connie Willis, in 2001.

== Translations ==
The story was translated into Polish in 1997 under the title "Oddział lipcowy"
