= Nebula Awards 29 =

1995 anthology edited by Pamela Sargent

- Cover of first edition
- Author: edited by Pamela Sargent
- Cover artist: Steven Cooley
- Language: English
- Series: Nebula Awards
- Genre: Science fiction short stories
- Publisher: Harcourt Brace
- Publication date: 1995
- Publication place: United States
- Media type: Print (hardcover)
- Pages: xii, 307 pp.
- ISBN: 0-15-100107-3
- Preceded by: Nebula Awards 28
- Followed by: Nebula Awards 30

Nebula Awards 29 is an anthology of award-winning science fiction short works edited by Pamela Sargent, the first of three successive volumes under her editorship. It was first published in hardcover and trade paperback by Harcourt Brace in April 1995.

== Summary ==
The book collects pieces that won or were nominated for the Nebula Awards for novel, novella, novelette and short story for the year 1994 and various nonfiction pieces related to the awards, together with the Rhysling Award-winning poems for 1993 and an introduction by the editor. Not all nominees for the various awards are included.

== Contents ==
- "Introduction" (Pamela Sargent)
- "The Year in Science Fiction and Fantasy: A Symposium" [essay] (Gregory Benford, Eleanor Arnason, Paul Di Filippo, Rebecca Ore, Maureen F. McHugh, Michael Swanwick, Robert J. Sawyer and Norman Spinrad)
- "The Man Who Rowed Christopher Columbus Ashore" [Best Short Story nominee] (Harlan Ellison)
- "Graves" [Best Short Story winner] (Joe Haldeman)
- "Festival Night" (excerpt from Red Mars) [Best Novel winner] (Kim Stanley Robinson)
- "Alfred" [Best Short Story nominee] (Lisa Goldstein)
- "In Memoriam: Avram Davidson 1923-1993" (Lucius Shepard)
- "In Memoriam: Lester del Rey 1915-1993" (Robert Silverberg)
- "In Memoriam: Chad Oliver 1928-1993" (Howard Waldrop)
- "Georgia on My Mind" [Best Novelette winner] (Charles Sheffield)
- "To Be from Earth" [Rhysling Award winner - long poem] (William J. Daciuk)
- "Will" [Rhysling Award winner - short poem] (Jane Yolen)
- "Death on the Nile" [Best Novelette nominee] (Connie Willis)
- "Big Teeth and Small Magic: SF and Fantasy Films of 1993" [essay] (Kathi Maio)
- "England Underway" [Best Novelette nominee] (Terry Bisson)
- "The Franchise" [Best Novelette nominee] (John Kessel)
- "The Night We Buried Road Dog" [Best Novella winner] (Jack Cady)

== Reception ==
Maria Simson in Publishers Weekly rates the anthology "excellent ... cover[ing] a broad range of styles, treatments and subjects. Selected SF authors, in short essays, bemoan the state of the genre, yet these stories and novellas (and even a poem or two) give the lie to any pessimism." She calls it "Essential reading for anyone who enjoys science fiction, this collection goes a long way toward demonstrating that, now and then, those who engage in the sometimes thankless task of bestowing writing awards really do know how to pick winners." The pieces by Willis, Sheffield and Cady are singled out for particular comment, as are the tributes to Davidson, del Rey and Oliver.

Carl Hays in Booklist notes that "Nebula award winners perennially represent the best state-of-the-art imaginative fiction, and 1994's are not exceptions. Editor Sargent provides a superlative showcase for the recipients and several runners-up by interspersing among them biographical sketches, overviews of sf films and poetry, and short essays by sf veterans appraising the year's creative highlights." He observes that "[a]lthough several of the pieces collected here appear in other year's-best anthologies, the Nebula gathering is, like its predecessors, an indispensable representation of the genre's best recent writing and a reliable indicator of its leading edge." He singles out the pieces by Haldeman, Sheffield and Cady for particular comment, as well as the excerpt from Robinson's novel.

Barbara Hawkins, assessing the book for younger readers in School Library Journal, calls it a "well-crafted collection" in which a "variety of styles and themes awaits readers," summing it up as "[a]ll told, a bountiful excursion for Y[oung] A[dult] minds." She singles out the Haldeman, Cady, Sheffield and Chambers pieces for comment.

The anthology was also reviewed by Gary K. Wolfe in Locus no. 411, April 1995 and Gary Reger in The New York Review of Science Fiction, September 1995.

== Awards ==
The book placed tenth in the 1996 Locus Poll Award for Best Anthology.
