= The Sunspacers Trilogy =

The Sunspacers Trilogy is a 1996 novel written by George Zebrowski.

== Plot summary ==
The Sunspacers Trilogy is a novel in which future humanity has colonized the solar system, and life is explored within "Sunspace"—the planetary stretch from Mercury to Pluto—where interplanetary commuting, mining, and research have become everyday affairs. People born on other planets experience Earth as a nostalgic concept, remembered distantly like Old World Europe. The narrative follows a student navigating academic life across worlds, encountering philosophy, politics, and the banalities of youth: parents' divorce, romantic explorations, career hunting. Despite this backdrop, the trilogy focuses less on dramatic space opera and more on methodical scientific exposition of planetary environments and sociological nuances. Even when the protagonist reaches Mercury, the story resists explosive developments in favor of subdued, intellectual exploration. Comprising Sunspacer (1984), The Stars Will Speak (1985), and Behind The Stars (1993)—the latter appearing in book form here for the first time—the trilogy emphasizes speculative realism over thrill.

== Reception ==
Jonathan Palmer reviewed The Sunspacers Trilogy for Arcane magazine, rating it a 6 out of 10 overall, and stated that "I expected the story to hot up when he got to Mercury, but it didn't. It's well built, but I found it uninspiring when taken purely as a piece of fiction. It seems I'm in a minority, but I felt Zebrowski could do a lot more to argue how humans might live in space than show that people from Earth can jump higher than people from Mercury, and that people from Mercury don't like that."

== Reviews ==
- Review by Paul Levinson (2001) in The New York Review of Science Fiction, August 2001
