= A Vision of Doom =

- Editor: Donald Sidney-Fryer
- Author: Ambrose Bierce
- Illustrator: Frank Villano
- Cover artist: Frank Villano
- Language: English
- Genre: poetry
- Publisher: Donald M. Grant, Publisher, Inc.
- Publication date: 1980
- Publication place: United States
- Media type: Print (Hardback)
- Pages: 110
- OCLC: 8171997

A Vision of Doom: Poems by Ambrose Bierce is a collection of poems by Ambrose Bierce and edited by Donald Sidney-Fryer. It was published in 1980 by Donald M. Grant, Publisher, Inc. in an edition of 900 copies.

== Contents ==
- "A Visionary of Doom", by Donald Sidney-Fryer
- "Basilica"
- "A Mystery"
- "The Passing Show"
- "Geotheos"
- "Invocation"
- "Religion"
- "T.A.H."
- "Contemplation"
- "The Golden Age"
- "A Learner"
- "A Possibility"
- "J.F.B."
- "The Death of Grant"
- "Laus Lucis"
- "Nanine"
- "To My Laundress"
- "Reminded"
- "Another Way"
- "To One Across the Way"
- "To Maude"
- "Tempora Mutantur"
- "To Nanine"
- "Restored"
- "Presentiment"
- "A Study in Gray"
- "Montefiore"
- "Francine"
- "One Morning"
- "The King of Bores"
- "Something in the Papers"
- "The Bride"
- "Again"
- "Oneiromancy"
- "Justice"
- "Creation"
- "Avalon"
- "A Vision of Doom"
- "The Perverted Village"
- "To Dog"
- "A Rational Anthem"
- "A Voluptuary"
- "Arbor Day"
- "Californian Summer Pictures"
  - "The Foot–Hill Resort"
  - "To the Happy Hunting Grounds"
- "Light Lie the Earth Upon His Dear Dead Heart"
- "Saralthia's Soliloquy"
- "Song of the Dead Body"
- "On Stone"
- "Dead"
- "Man is Long Ages Dead"
