= G. Sutton Breiding =

American poet

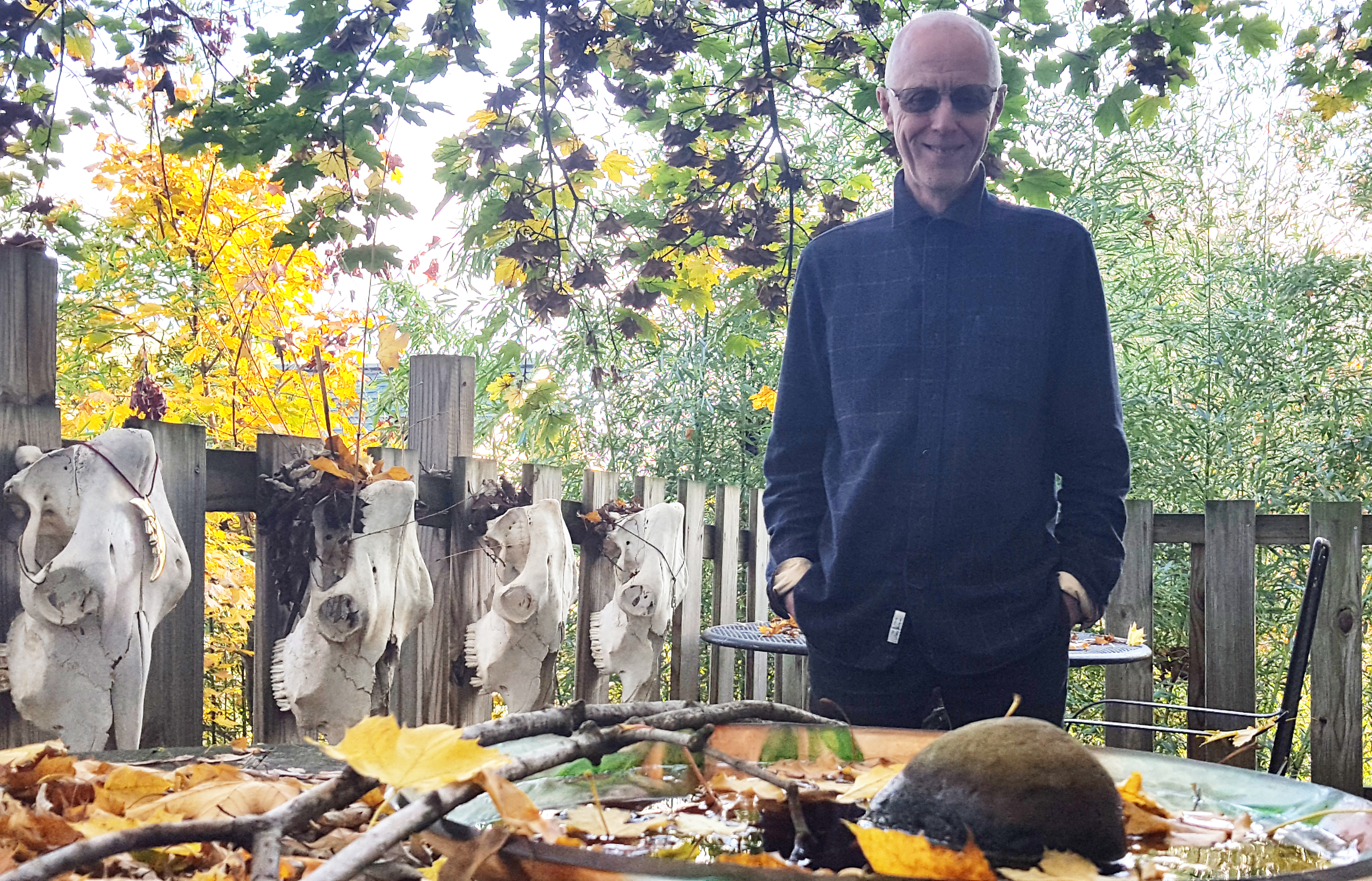
- Born: August 17, 1950 (age 76); Elkins, West Virginia, U.S.
- Occupations: Poet, Zine Publisher
- Spouse: Jenny Nulf (m. 1983; div. 1991)
- Writing career
- Period: 1960s–present
- Genres: Weird Poetry, Speculative Poetry, Surreal Poetry, Black Humor, Fantasy Poetry, Horror Poetry, San Francisco Bay Area Poetry, Science Fiction Poetry
- Notable awards: Rhysling Award for Short Poem; 1990
- Website: gsuttonbreiding.net

G. Sutton Breiding (born August 17, 1950) is an American poet and zine publisher of Speculative poetry, science fiction, dark fantasy, and horror poetry characterized by mysticism, black humor and references to San Francisco.

== Biography ==
Born in Elkins, WV, G. Sutton Breiding lived at Oglebay Park in Wheeling, WV until 1962, in Morgantown, WV from 1962 until 1968, and in San Francisco, CA, from 1968 to 1986. Between 1968 and 1986, he lived in Greenbank, WV in 1971 and in Morgantown, WV, and near Orono, ME in 1977. He returned to Morgantown, WV, in 1986, moved to Columbiana, OH in 2007, and returned to Morgantown in 2009.

"He began writing at age fourteen, and in a Catholic high school outraged his teachers with his first newsletter. Breiding's poetry and essays have been featured in Foxfire (magazine), Star*Line, Bleak December, The Romantist, The Diversifier, Nyctalops, Fantôme, Grue, Grue Magazine, and Figment.

He won the 1990 Rhysling Award for Best Short Poem for "Epitaph for Dreams" which first appeared in Narcopolis & Other Poems edited by Peggy Nadramia. His poems were nominated for the Rhysling Award in 1993, 2005, 2011, and 2014.

In the introduction to his collection of selected poems "Autumn Roses," published in 1984 by Silver Scarab Press, Donald Sidney-Fryer writes that Breiding ranks as a modern example of California Romantics including Ambrose Bierce, George Sterling, Nora May French, and Clark Ashton Smith. Autumn Roses is annotated by Steve Eng in the Fantasy and Horror Poetry chapter of Neil Barron's 1999 Critical and Historical Guide to Fantasy and Horror. Eng calls Breiding one of the "most talented genre bards in the past two decades." Eng also notes his eroticism and humorous sense of irony. Influences remarked on by Eng, Sidney-Fryer, and D. S. Black, include Edgar Allan Poe, Charles Baudelaire, Edvard Munch, Arthur Machen, George Trakl, Emil Cioran, Edmond Jabès, Li He, Bruno Schulz, West Coast Romantics, Dada, Surrealism, Existentialism, Beat Generation, New York School, Abstract Expressionism, and Punk subculture.

Sidney-Fryer's introduction to Breiding's Journal of an Astronaut, a 1992 back-to-back publication with Janet Hamill's Nostalgia of the Infinite, describes Breiding's futuristic vision as including "appealing remnants of Appalachian life and such of its wilderness as actually survives, the cicada, the titmouse, the chickadee, the wren, together with the steadfast presence of old barns and old homesteads, as well as rare old stands of trees. His reader experiences a particularly modern sense of dislocation expressed in a particularly modern style." Along with horror, the reader will also experiences "a unique sense of wonder and wonder and marvel and transcendent mystery, as well as a healing sense of wholesomeness of our planet-biosphere and of the very earth itself, the tenderness and even delicacy displayed in the infinitude of green growing things and of the fauna sustained on that flora." Journal of an Astronaut/Nostalgia of the Infinite is listed in the Beat Poetry Collection in the Special Collections and Archives at Utah State University.

Special library collections including his books, correspondence, manuscripts, and zines are held at the University of California at Berkeley, West Virginia University, Utah State University, and the University of Iowa.

== Zine Publishing ==
The Punk-Surrealist Cafe was on display in the October, 2009 exhibition Punk Passage: San Francisco First Wave Punk, a display and event at the San Francisco Public Library curated by and featuring photographer Ruby Ray. Breiding's Zine's are featured in the M. Horvat Science Fiction Fanzine Collection housed at the University of Iowa Libraries.

Additional zine titles Breiding published include Black Wolf, A Clerk's Journal, Dumdum, Ebon Lute, Eremite's Column, Folklore, Personals, Phantom Poet, and Surrealist Exchange.

== Awards ==
- 1990 Rhysling Award (Best Short Poem winner for "Epitaph for Dreams")

=== Nominations ===
- 2010 Rhysling Award for Best Long Poem (for "Postcards from Mars") Originally published in Star*Line 32.4 July/August 2009 http://www.sfpoetry.com/sl/issues/starline32.4.html http://sfpoetry.com/sl/edchoice/32.4-3.html
- 2012 Rhysling Award for Best Long Poem (for "Letter from the Golden Age")
- 2014 Rhysling for Best Short Poem (for "There Are Signs of Faerie Everywhere")

== Bibliography ==
- Breiding, G S. Autumn Roses: Selected Poems of G. Sutton Breiding Albuquerque, NM: Silver Scarab Press, 1984. OCLC# 15643562
- Breiding, G S, Caré Galbraith, Lance Alexander, and D S. Black. Necklace of Blood San Francisco: Atlantis Express, 1988. OCLC# 62409677
- Breiding, G S, Don Herron, William Breiding, Chet Clingan, Walter Shedlofsky, and Tina Said. G. Sutton Breiding Papers, 1974. OCLC# 39514735
- Hamill, Janet, and G S. Breiding. Nostalgia of the Infinite. Journal of an Astronaut Denver, CO: Ocean View Books, 1992. OCLC# 25202333
- Black, D S, and G S. Breiding. Memory Leaves San Francisco: Atlantis Express, 1989. OCLC# 26941644 ISBN 0929792025 ISBN 9780929792026
- Joshi, S. T. and Steven J. Mariconda, eds. Dreams of fear: poetry of terror and the supernatural New York: Hippocampus Press, 2013.
- The 1990 Rhysling Anthology: Nominees for the Best Fantastic Poetry of 1989 Science Fiction Poetry Association (SFPA): 1990.
- Dutcher, Roger, Jane Yolen, G S. Breiding, Etal. The Alchemy of Stars: Rhysling Award Winners Showcase United States: Science Fiction Poetry Association, 2005. OCLC# 67764763 ISBN 0809511622 ISBN 9780809511624
- Gardner, Lyn C. A, Mary A. Agner, G S. Breiding, Etal. The 2012 Rhysling Anthology: The Best Science Fiction, Fantasy, and Horror Poetry of 2011. Covina, CA: Science Fiction Poetry Association, 2012. OCLC# 798838113 ISBN 9781885093639 ISBN 1885093632
- Ristow, Rich. Ed. The 2015 Rhysling Anthology Hadrosaur Press, 2015. ISBN 1885093802 ISBN 978-1885093806
- Walters, Jerad. Stigmata: An Anthology of Writing and Art Denver, CO: Cocytus Press, 2001. OCLC# 50022052 ISBN 0971205108 ISBN 9780971205109 ISBN 0971205116 ISBN 9780971205116
- Breiding, G S. Hallucinating Jenny Napa Valley, Calif: Miniature Sun Press, 2000. OCLC#312140009 ISBN 096766666X ISBN 9780967666662
- Breiding, G S. Interstice 1: At Work Charlottesville, Va.: Juxta Press, 1996. OCLC# 36592105
- Breiding, G S., Ed. Black Wolf San Francisco, Calif: Crow Mountain Pressworks, 1974. OCLC# 70889562
- Nadramia, Peggy, ed. Narcopolis & Other Poems New York: Hell's Kitchen Publications, 1989. OCLC# 22778785 ISBN 0962328618 ISBN 9780962328619
- Allen, Thomas Allen, ed. Nouveau's Midnight Sun: Transcriptions from Golgonooza and Beyond Edmonds WA: Ravenna Press, 2014.
- Breiding, G S., "Untitled" Eye to the Telescope: The Science Fiction Poetry Online Journal of Speculative Poetry. Male Perspectives. Simon, Marge, ed. Issue 21, July 2016. Online.
- Breiding, G. Sutton. "Crayon Journals: Book 2: October." FLIPHTML5. 2016. Web.
- Breiding, G Sutton. "Manuscript Found on the Golden Gate Bridge." SoundCloud. 2016. Web.
