= George Zebrowski =

American science fiction writer and editor (1945–2024)

- Born: December 28, 1945; Villach, Carinthia, Austria
- Died: December 20, 2024 (aged 78)
- Known for: Science fiction writer and editor

George Zebrowski (December 28, 1945 – December 20, 2024) was an American science fiction writer and editor who wrote and edited a number of books, and was a former editor of The Bulletin of the Science Fiction Writers of America. He lived with author Pamela Sargent, with whom he co-wrote a number of novels, including Star Trek novels.

Zebrowski won the John W. Campbell Memorial Award in 1999 for his novel Brute Orbits. Three of his short stories, "Heathen God," "The Eichmann Variations," and "Wound the Wind," were nominated for the Nebula Award, and "The Idea Trap" was nominated for the Theodore Sturgeon Award.

Zebrowski died on December 20, 2024, at the age of 78. His death was announced after he had been in a nursing home for several months.

== Bibliography ==
=== Novels ===
- The Omega Point (1972) [Omega Point #2]
- The Star Web (1975)
- Ashes and Stars (1977) [Omega Point #1]
- Sunspacer (1978)
- Macrolife (1979)
- A Silent Shout (1979)
- Mirror of Minds (1983) [Omega Point #3]
- The Omega Point Trilogy (1983)
- The Stars Will Speak (1985)
- Stranger Suns (1989)
- Behind the Stars (1996)
- The Sunspacers Trilogy (1996)
- The Killing Star (1996) with Charles R. Pellegrino
- Brute Orbits (1998)
- Cave of Stars (1999)
- Empties (2009)

=== Star Trek novels ===
- A Fury Scorned (1996). Co-written with Pamela Sargent. Based on Star Trek: The Next Generation television series.
- Heart of the Sun (1997). Co-written with Pamela Sargent. Based on Star Trek: The Original Series television series.
- Dyson Sphere (April, 1999). Co-written with Charles R. Pellegrino. Based on Star Trek: The Next Generation television series.
- Across the Universe (October, 1999). Co-written with Pamela Sargent. Based on Star Trek: The Original Series television series.
- Garth of Izar (2003). Co-written with Pamela Sargent. Based on Star Trek: The Original Series television series.

=== Collections ===
- The Monadic Universe (1977)
- Swift Thoughts (2002)
- In the Distance, and Ahead in Time (2002)
- Black Pockets: And Other Dark Thoughts (2006)

=== Anthologies edited ===
- Human Machines: An Anthology of Stories About Cyborgs (1975) with Thomas Scortia
- Tomorrow Today: No. 1 (1975)
- Faster than Light (1976) with Jack Dann
- Three in Space (1981) with Jack Dann and Pamela Sargent
- Creations: The Quest for Origins in Story and Science (1983) with Isaac Asimov and Martin Greenberg
- Nebula Awards 20 (1985)
- Nebula Awards 21 (1986)
- Synergy: New Science Fiction, Volume 1 (1987)
- Nebula Awards 22 (1988)
- Synergy: New Science Fiction, Volume 2 (1988)
- Synergy: New Science Fiction, Volume 3 (1988)
- Synergy: New Science Fiction, Volume 4 (1989)
- Three in Time (1997) with Jack Dann and Pamela Sargent
- Synergy SF: New Science Fiction (2004)

=== Nonfiction ===
- Beneath the Red Star: Studies on International Science Fiction (1996)
- Skylife: Space Habitats in Story and Science (2000) with Gregory Benford

== Sources ==
- The Encyclopedia of Science Fiction
- SFWA
- ISFDB
