= Nora May French =

American poet (1881–1907)

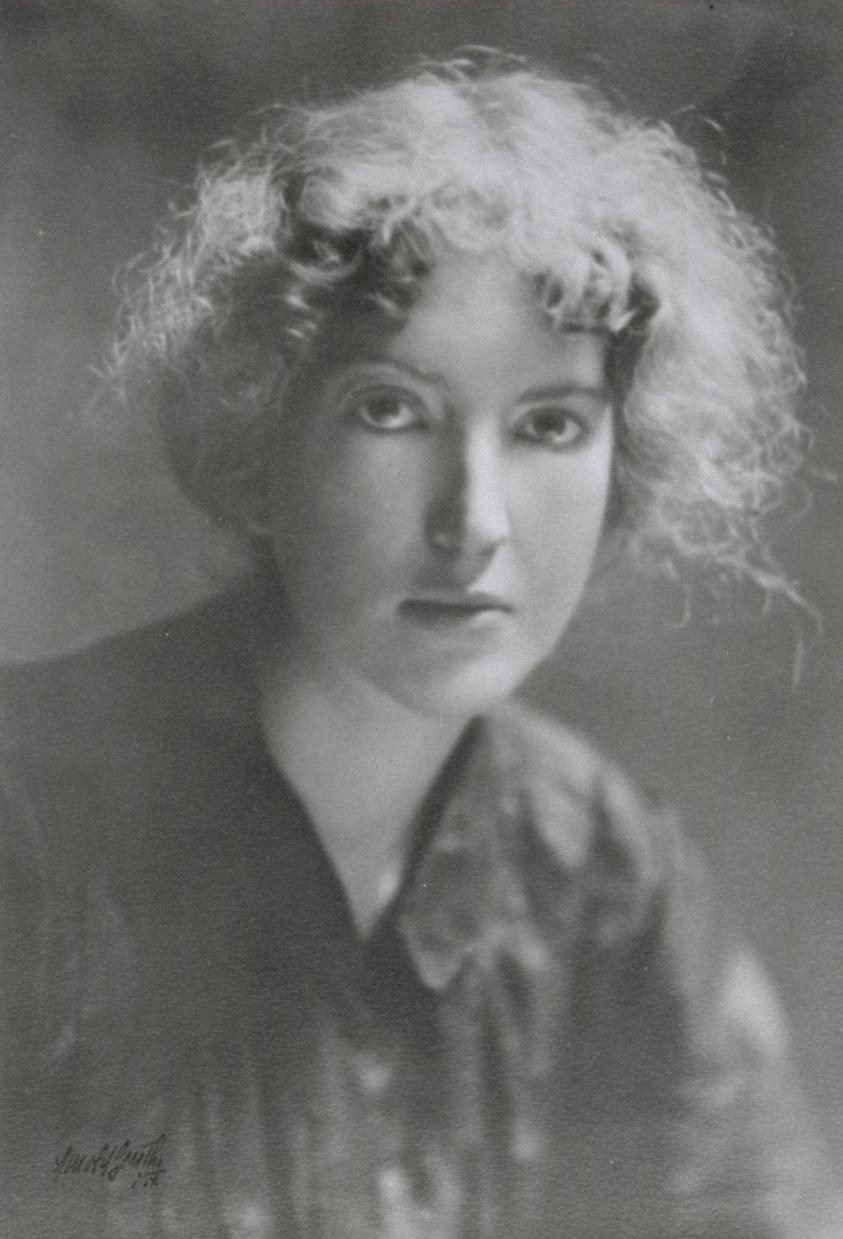
- Nora May French, by Arnold Genthe.
- Born: 1881; Aurora, New York, U.S.
- Died: November 13, 1907 (aged 25–26); Carmel-by-the-Sea, California, U.S.
- Notable work: The Spanish Girl
- Movement: Bohemian

Nora May French (1881 – November 13, 1907) was an American journalist, poet, and member of the bohemian literary circles of the Carmel Arts and Crafts Club which flourished after the Great San Francisco Earthquake and Fire of 1906.

== Early life ==
French was born in 1881 in Aurora, New York to Edward French, a professor at Wells College and Mary Wells French, the sister of the founder of Wells Fargo, Henry Wells. When she was seven years old, her wealthy family moved to a ranch outside of Los Angeles, but within a few years they lost that property as a result of a devastating house fire and a failed fruit crop.

== Career ==
Her writing career began in her teens, when she was published in local newspapers and magazines. In her early twenties, she became engaged, off and on again, to Alan Hiley, a prosperous timber farmer. Her ambivalence about conventional marriage poured into The Spanish Girl, her best known lyrics, a twenty-two poem chronicle of doomed love. After their final break-up, French joined Charles Lummis's Arroyo Seco, a group of Los Angeles writers and poets who encouraged her to publish in Lummis' Out West magazine. Although her work won praise, notably from the feminist and environmentalist poet Mary Austin, recognition did not translate to financial security.

French became involved with married Henry Anderson Lafler, an assistant editor on The Argonaut, and moved to San Francisco after the 1906 earthquake. She quickly made her place within bohemian intellectual circles. Pregnant by Lafler (who himself had had numerous affairs with married and unmarried women), unable to secure a hospital abortion, she self-administered an abortion with store-bought pills, writing Lafler a letter about her decision as she did so. Even as her personal life was in turmoil, her national profile as a writer was rising with publications in The Saturday Evening Post, and Sunset magazine.

== Death ==
In 1907, she joined George Sterling and his wife at their home in Carmel. On Monday November 11, she allegedly tried to kill herself with a gunshot to the head. The incident was reported by Carrie Sterling. Two days later, during the night of November 13–14, aged 26, she died at the Sterling home (with only Mrs. Sterling present as George was in San Francisco) from ingesting cyanide. Newspapers in the San Francisco Bay Area sensationalized the tragedy with glaring headlines and reports of Bohemian dissipations as well as recent and frequent visits by prominent married men, including the artists Charles Dickman, Xavier Martinez, and Charles Rollo Peters. Writers Ambrose Bierce and Herman Scheffauer speculated that she had had an affair with George Sterling. Funeral services were at Point Lobos with, among others, the Sterlings, James Hopper, Alan Hiley, and Henry Lafler attending. Her ashes were scattered into the Pacific Ocean.

== Legacy ==
Over the objections of her family, George Sterling and Harry Lafler published French's Poems in 1910, the only compilation of her work ever widely distributed until the recent (2009) release of Hippocampus Press's The Outer Gate: The Collected Poems Of Nora May French.

Although many of her poems celebrate the serenity of coastal landscape, others are less sanguine: they offer glimpses into the mind of a young woman torn between pressure to submit to social roles and longing to live creatively.
