= Thomas A. Easton =

American writer

Thomas A. Easton (born 17 July 1944) is a teacher and well-known science fiction critic and author. He retired as a professor from Thomas College of Maine in 2014 and now teaches part-time at Mount Ida College in Newton, MA.

Easton holds a Bachelor of Arts in Biology from Colby College and a doctorate in theoretical biology from the University of Chicago.

He wrote the book review column in SF magazine Analog Science Fiction and Fact from 1979 - 2009. He appears frequently at Boston-area science fiction conventions.

His work on scientific and futuristic issues has appeared in many magazines, from Astronomy to Robotics Age. His latest nonfiction books are Careers in Science (VGM, 4th ed., 2004), Taking Sides: Clashing Views on Controversial Issues in Science, Technology, and Society (McGraw-Hill Dushkin, 8th ed., 2008), and Taking Sides: Clashing Views on Controversial Environmental Issues (McGraw-Hill Dushkin, 12th ed., 2007). His latest novels are Firefight (Betancourt, 2003) and The Great Flying Saucer Conspiracy (Wildside, 2002).

== Bibliography ==
=== Novels ===
- Easton, Thomas A. (1995). Silicon karma. San Simeon, Calif.: Serendipity Systems.

Organic Future series

- Sparrowhawk (1990)
- Greenhouse (1991)
- Woodsman (1992)
- Tower of the Gods (1993)
- Seeds of Destiny (1994)
- The Electric Gene Machine (2000), a collection of short stories

=== Anthologies edited ===
- Visions of Tomorrow: Science Fiction Predictions That Came True (2010) with Judith K. Dial https://www.skyhorsepublishing.com/search-results/?keyword=Visions+of+tomorrow
- Impossible Futures (2013) with Judith K. Dial https://www.pinknarc.com/store/p10/Impossible_Futures.html
- Easton, Thomas A. & Judith K. Dial, eds. (2015). Deco punk : the spirit of the age. Auburn, Mass.: Pink Narcissus Press.
- Conspiracy! (2016) with Judith K. Dial http://www.nesfa.org/press/Books/Conspiracy.html
- Tales of Galactic Pest Control (2025) with David Gerrold

=== Chapterbooks ===
- "Alien Resonance" (1990)
- "Maine Quartet" (2009)

=== Short fiction ===
==== Collections ====
- Ten Science Fiction Stories (1989)
- Gedanken Fictions: Stories on Themes in Science, Technology, and Society (1996)
- Bigfoot Stalks the Coast of Maine and Other Twisted Downeast Tales (2000)
- The Electric Gene Machine (2000)

==== List of stories ====
Howie Wyman series

- Mood Wendigo (1980)
- Downeast Encounter (1980)
- Gambling Man (1980)
- Fishing Trip (1981)
- Alas, Poor Yorick (1981)
- Return of the Native (1981)
- Energy Crisis (1982)

Jimmy Brane series

- Down on the Truck Farm (1990)
- Matchmaker (1990)

Other

- "Next" (1974)
- "End and Beginning" (1974)
- "Shrine" (1975)
- "Preview Preview Test: The GB Roachster" (1976)
- "The Chicago Plan to Save a Species" (1976)
- "Notes from the Safety Overground" (1976) with W. Dinteman
- "Help Not Wanted" (1977)
- "Movers and Shakers" (1979)
- "Closest Kin" (1979)
- "Breakfast of Champions" (1980)
- "Tetherball" (1980)
- "Protection Racket" (1981)
- "The Last Flute" (1981)
- "The Blue-Tail Fly" (1981)
- "Speed Trap" (1982)
- "The Bung-Hole Caper" (1982)
- "Needle and Thread" (1982)
- "Ground Truth" (1983)
- "The Tailor" (1983)
- "A Love Story" (1983)
- "Right to Life" (1985)
- "Social Climber" (1988)
- "The Tree" (1988)
- "Hard Times" (1988)
- "Roll Them Bones" (1988)
- "To Fan the Flame" (1988)
- "The Coming of the Mayflower" (1989)
- "Kiss Me, Kate" (1989)
- "When Life Hands You a Lemming ..." (1989)
- "Sing a Song of Porkchops" (1989)
- "Going Home" (1990)
- "Lost Luggage" (1990)
- "Alien Resonance" (1990)
- "Versey Vicey" (1991)
- "Micro Macho" (1991)
- "Black Earth and Destiny" (1991) (Collected in Mike Resnick's anthology Alternate Presidents)
- "Swingin Proud'n Free" (1992)
- "The Pragmatists Take a Bow" (1993)
- "Clem, The Little Copper" (1994)
- "Wallflower" (1996)
- "Real Men Don't Bark at Fire Hydrants" (2000)
- "Foggy Acres Blues" (2002)

=== Poetry ===
- "Surrender the Buddy Electrical" (1987)
- "Alien Heat" (1988)
- "Interstellar Arcs" (1988)
- "Modern Madness" (1989)
- "Reality Is Morally Neutral" (1989)
- "Love Song for Lonely Aliens" (1989)
- "The Alien's Revenge" (1989)
- "Seafood Futures" (1990)
- "Hackers Crack the Papal Porn" (1990)
- "Bubbles" (1991)
- "Chromosomes" (1993)

=== Non-fiction ===
==== Books ====
- Periodic Stars: An Overview of Science Fiction Literature in the 1980s and '90s (1997)
- Off the Main Sequence (2007)

==== Essays and reporting ====
- "Life Needs a beginning" (1975)
- "Is the Universe a Yo-Yo?" (1979)
- "Amazing Facts" (Amazing Stories, February 1980) (1980)
- "Fantastic Facts - Weather Report: Chicago 2000" (1980)
- "Amazing Facts" (Amazing Stories, May 1980) (1980)
- "Fantastic Facts: Alternate Worlds" (1980)
- "State of the Art: Poetry with Rivets" (1988)
- "Is Science Fiction Just Tabloid Futurism ? or The Great Untapped Market" (1989)
- "Speculative Poetry, Pt. 1: Filler, Fiber, or Forgettable" (1991) with Marge B. Simon and John Grey and G. Sutton Breiding
- "Book Reviewing: A Matter Of Opinion" (1992)
- "Letter" (Locus #392) (1993)
- "Concluding Statements" (1996) with Stephen L. Gillett, Ph.D.
- "Beware the Virtual Reality Jungle" (1996)
- "Introduction" (Bigfoot Stalks the Coast of Maine and Other Twisted Downeast Tales) (2000)
- "Astounding Continuity" (2007)
- "Preface" (Visions of Tomorrow: Science Fiction Predictions that Came True) (2010) with Judith K. Dial
- "Destinies: Issues to Shape our Future" (2020)

===== Science Fact (Analog) series =====
- "Robots - Rams from Cams" (1972)
- "Let There Be Light!" (1974)
- "Life is in The Stars" (1974)
- "The Biopump Solution" (1974)
- "Turing Point" (1975)
- "Altruism, Evolution, and Society" (1976)
- "Twenty Years to Space" (1979)
- "Decline and Fall" (1981)
- "The Future of Biological Engineering" (1982)
- "Trapped Between Damnations: The True Meaning of the Population Crisis" (1996)
- "The 3D Trainwreck" (2008)
- Easton, Thomas A. (Nov 2013). "3D printing and dancing bears". Science Fact. Analog Science Fiction and Fact. 133 (11): 19–23.

==== Review columns ====
- The Reference Library (Analog book review column, 1978–2008)

==== Interior art ====
- The Biopump Solution (1974)

=== Critical studies and reviews of Easton's work ===
Deco punk

- Sakers, Don (October 2015). "The Reference Library". Analog Science Fiction and Fact. 135 (10): 105–108.
