= Bill Warren (film historian) =

American film historian and critic (1943–2016)

- Born: William Bond Warren; April 26, 1943; North Bend, Oregon, U.S.
- Died: October 7, 2016 (aged 73); Los Angeles, California, U.S.
- Education: University of Oregon
- Occupations: Film historian, film critic
- Spouse: Beverly Warren (m. 1966)

William Bond Warren (April 26, 1943 – October 7, 2016) was an American film historian, critic, and one of the leading authorities on science fiction, horror, and fantasy films.

== Early life and education ==
Warren was born in North Bend, Oregon and grew up in Gardiner on the Umpqua River. He became interested in science fiction films during the genre's first boom period in the 1950s after seeing The Day the Earth Stood Still (1951). Discovering Famous Monsters of Filmland with its first issues, he received regular acknowledgments and thanks as a contributor throughout the early years of the magazine, along with Don Glut, Eric Hoffman, and Mark Thomas McGee. After attending Reedsport High School, he graduated from the University of Oregon, in Eugene, Oregon.

== Move to Los Angeles ==
Warren and his wife Beverly moved to Los Angeles in 1966. As an assistant to science fiction agent, editor, and collector Forrest J Ackerman, Warren came into contact with major filmmakers-in-waiting, also inspired by Ackerman; he went on to develop personal friendships with several of them.

He and Beverly became very active in the Los Angeles Science Fantasy Society, as well as being involved in many of the Los Angeles-centric science fiction conventions held through the 1980s. He and friend Allan Rothstein were on the convention committee of L.A. Con II, the 42nd World Science Fiction Convention (Worldcon). Taking advantage of their knowledge of who was attending and the convention's programming schedule, they wrote the murder mystery, Fandom is a Way of Death, set at the convention. Everyone named in the story, except the detective Johnny Atlantis, were real people, including all the victims and the murderer. This was sold separately as a convention publication, with the solution placed in an envelope with every copy. On the last day of L.A. Con II, the murderer was revealed and took a bow.

Warren's 1968 short story "Death Is a Lonely Place" appeared in the first issue of the magazine Worlds of Fantasy. During this period, he also wrote stories for Warren Publishing's oversize black-and-white comic books Creepy, Eerie, and Vampirella.

== Books ==
In the late 1960s and early 1970s, Warren made significant contributions to Walt Lee's three volume Reference Guide to Fantastic Films (Chelsea-Lee Books, 1973). He helped plan the project, did the final research, and prepared the final type galleys for publication. Warren was also a regular contributor to Leonard Maltin's Movie Guide, a book series of capsule film reviews that began in 1969; it was updated annually beginning in 1978.

The first volume of Warren's authoritative Keep Watching the Skies! American Science Fiction Movies of the Fifties was first published in trade hardcover by McFarland in 1982; he followed that with a second, larger companion hardcover in 1986, also from McFarland. This exhaustive survey of science fiction films released from 1950 through 1962 was reprinted by McFarland in three trade paperback volumes in 1997. In order to incorporate quotes from scores of filmmaker interviews conducted by Tom Weaver, and a number of color stills and film posters, a revised and expanded, 1040 page "21st Century" edition was prepared and released by McFarland in a large hardcover format in 2009. The volume also contains a new introduction by Austin, Texas science fiction writer Howard Waldrop.

At the request of film director Sam Raimi, Warren began writing the book The Evil Dead Companion in 1994; the book was first published in the UK by Titan Books (2000), followed by the US edition from St. Martin's Press in 2001.

== Film critic ==
Warren was the film critic for a newspaper in Simi Valley, California during the 1980s. In 1989, he created the ShowBiz Roundtable for the online service GEnie to generate discussions about films and other aspects of show business. He may have been the first critic credentialed by the MPAA to write online reviews. Following newspaper tradition, he only posted his GEnie film reviews online the day a film opened. After these reviews were posted, they were archived in the GEnie Library; with weekly postings during the early 1990s, this became the first large film review database available online. Warren also conducted live online interviews on GEnie with various film personalities; he eventually left the ShowBiz Roundtable, which still continues today at Delphi's online service.

== Home media and television ==
Warren occasionally contributed to supplemental material for DVD and Blu-ray film releases. During the 1990s, he teamed with film director William Rotsler to produce segments surveying American television for the French TV series Destination séries.

== Death ==
Warren died in his sleep on October 7, 2016, at the age of 73 in Los Angeles after a long illness.
