= Nebula Awards Showcase 2001 =

2001 anthology edited by Robert Silverberg

- Cover of first edition
- Editor: Robert Silverberg
- Cover artist: Kelly Nelson
- Language: English
- Series: Nebula Awards Showcase
- Genre: Science fiction
- Publisher: Harcourt
- Publication date: 2001
- Publication place: United States
- Media type: Print (hardcover)
- Pages: xv, 252
- ISBN: 0-15-100581-8
- Preceded by: Nebula Awards Showcase 2000
- Followed by: Nebula Awards Showcase 2002

Nebula Awards Showcase 2001 is an anthology of science fiction short works edited by Robert Silverberg. It was first published in hardcover and trade paperback by Harcourt in April 2001.

== Summary ==
The book collects pieces that won or were nominated for the Nebula Awards for best novel, novella, novelette and short story for the year 2000, a profile of 2000 grand master winner Brian W. Aldiss and a representative early story by him, and various other nonfiction pieces related to the awards, together with the Rhysling Award-winning poems for 1999 and an introduction by the editor. Not all nominees for the various awards are included, and the best novel is represented by an excerpt.

== Contents ==
- "Introduction: Nebulas at Century's End" (Robert Silverberg)
- "Story of Your Life" [Best Novella winner, 2000] (Ted Chiang)
- "Mars Is No Place for Children" [Best Novelette winner, 2000] (Mary A. Turzillo)
- "The Cost of Doing Business" [Best Short Story winner, 2000] (Leslie What)
- Parable of the Talents (epilogue) [Best Novel winner, 2000] (Octavia E. Butler)
- "Unhidden Agendas, Unfinished Dialogues: 1999 in Science Fiction" [essay] (Gary K. Wolfe)
- "The Wedding Album" [Best Novella nominee, 2000] (David Marusek)
- "Radiant Doors" [Best Short Story nominee, 2000] (Michael Swanwick)
- "The Grand Master Award: Brian W. Aldiss" [essay] (Harry Harrison)
- "Judas Danced" (Brian W. Aldiss)
- "Author Emeritus 2000: Daniel Keyes" [essay] (Barry N. Malzberg)
- "Algernon, Charlie, and I: A Writer's Journey" [essay] (Daniel Keyes)
- "Confessions of a Body Thief" [Rhysling Award - Best Long Poem winner, 1999] (Bruce Boston)
- "egg horror poem" [Rhysling Award - Best Short Poem winner, 1999] (Laurel Winter)
- "Appendixes"

== Reception ==
Roland Green in Booklist calls the book "a worthwhile addition for most sf collections" that "could be characterized as 'how the Science Fiction and Fantasy Writers of America view the field.'" He views the excerpt from the best novel winner as typically "inadequate" and Harrison's profile of Grand Master Brian Aldis as "idiosyncratic," while feeling Author Emeritus Daniel Keyes "speaks eloquently for himself about the origins and history of his sf masterpiece, Flowers for Algernon (1965)."

Jackie Cassada, writing in Library Journal, wrote that the collection "highlight[s] the year's best contributions to the genre" and calls it "[a] good addition to most libraries' sf collections," singling out Chiang's, Turzillo's and Butler's pieces for particular comment.

Kirkus Reviews noted that "[t]he award-winning stories all appear," highlighting "worthy runners-up David Marusek and Michael Swanwick" and Grand Master Brian Aldiss's "typically clever, chilling story." But "[o]n the downside," the reviewer scores "the reluctance of SF/fantasy to examine itself," giving as examples the introduction, in which Silverberg "burbles gently," and Wolfe's handling of "the year's roundup ...; not surprisingly, he has nothing cogent to say," and decries the fact that, "despite the passing of such luminaries as A. E. van Vogt, Marion Zimmer Bradley, James White, and Stanley Kubrick, no obituaries appear." The review also takes to task Author Emeritus Daniel Keyes's description of "the genesis of his extraordinary and moving story 'Flowers for Algernon'; perusing this piece, readers will also understand why he never wrote anything else of real consequence." In summation, "[t]he quality of the fiction's not in dispute, but it's hard to justify that sky-high price tag for a short volume consisting mostly of reprints."

The collection was also reviewed by Gary K. Wolfe in Locus #484, May 2001.
