= Nebula Awards 33 =

1999 anthology of science fiction short works edited by Connie Willis

- Cover of first edition
- Editor: Connie Willis
- Cover artist: Joseph Drivas
- Language: English
- Series: Nebula Awards
- Genre: Science fiction
- Publisher: Harcourt Brace
- Publication date: 1999
- Publication place: United States
- Media type: Print (hardcover)
- Pages: xiii, 272
- ISBN: 0-15-100372-6
- OCLC: 41018970
- Dewey Decimal: 813.087608
- LC Class: PS648.S3 N4 1999
- Preceded by: Nebula Awards 32
- Followed by: Nebula Awards Showcase 2000

Nebula Awards 33 is an anthology of science fiction short works edited by Connie Willis. It was first published in hardcover and trade paperback by Harcourt Brace in April 1999.

== Summary ==
The book collects pieces that won or were nominated for the Nebula Awards for best novel, novella, novelette and short story for the year 1999, profiles of 1998 Author Emeritus Nelson Bond and 1998 Grand Master award winner Poul Anderson with representative early stories by them, and various other nonfiction pieces related to the awards, together with the Rhysling Award-winning poems for 1997 and an introduction by the editor. Not all nominees for the various awards are included, and the best novel is represented by an excerpt.

== Contents ==
- "Introduction" (Connie Willis)
- "Sister Emily's Lightship" [Best Short Story winner, 1998] (Jane Yolen)
- "Itsy Bitsy Spider" [Best Short Story nominee, 1998] (James Patrick Kelly)
- "The Nebula Award for Best Novel" [essay] (Connie Willis)
- "An Excerpt from The Moon and the Sun [Best Novel winner, 1998] (Vonda N. McIntyre)
- "The Flowers of Aulit Prison" [Best Novelette winner, 1998] (Nancy Kress)
- "The Crab Lice" [Best Short Story nominee, 1998] (Gregory Feeley)
- "The 1997 Author Emeritus: Nelson Bond" [essay] (Connie Willis)
- "The Bookshop" [short story] (Nelson Bond)
- "Three Hearings on the Existence of Snakes in the Human Bloodstream" [Best Novelette nominee, 1998] (James Alan Gardner)
- "The Dead" [Best Short Story nominee, 1998] (Michael Swanwick)
- "Rhysling Award Winners" [essay] (Connie Willis)
- "Day Omega" [Rhysling Award - Best Short Poem winner, 1997] (W. Gregory Stewart)
- "Spotting UFOs While Canning Tomatoes" [Rhysling Award – Best Long Poem winner, 1997] (Terry A. Garey)
- "The Elizabeth Complex" [Best Short Story nominee, 1998] (Karen Joy Fowler)
- "Abandon in Place" [Best Novella winner, 1998] (Jerry Oltion)
- "The Grand Master Award: Poul Anderson" [essay] (Connie Willis)
- "A Tribute to Poul Anderson" [essay] (Jack Williamson)
- "The Martyr" [novelette] (Poul Anderson)
- "Alive and Well: Messages from the Edge (almost) of the Millennium" [essay] (Kim Stanley Robinson, Michael Cassutt, Sheila Williams, Christie Golden, Cynthia Felice, Ellen Datlow, Beth Meacham, Wil McCarthy and Geoffrey A. Landis)
- "A Few Last Words to Put It All in Perspective" [essay] (Connie Willis)

== Reception ==
Kirkus Reviews called the anthology's fiction "[t]errific," singling out McIntyre's novel as "splendid historical fantasy", the finalist pieces as "impressive", and the Anderson selection as "typically brilliant". The reviewer has "a Bronx cheer for the nonfiction," however, characterizing them as a "thumping disappointment... just anodyne scraps (the redoubtable Kim Stanley Robinson honorably excepted)". It also notes the omission of both Bill Warren's film criticism and any obituaries, given the 1997 passings of Jerome Bixby, Judith Merrill, and George Turner. "Maybe somebody decided that last year's opinionated and thoroughly refreshing growls and hisses Simply Wouldn't Do."

The collection was also reviewed by Gary K. Wolfe in Locus no. 459, April 1999, Clinton Lawrence in Science Fiction Weekly, Apr. 12, 1999, and John Clute in The New York Review of Science Fiction, July 1999.

== Awards ==
The anthology placed twelfth in the 2000 Locus Poll Award for Best Anthology.
