= The Iron Dragon's Daughter =

1993 novel by Michael Swanwick

- First UK edition
- Author: Michael Swanwick
- Cover artist: Geoff Taylor
- Language: English
- Genre: Science fantasy
- Publisher: Millennium (UK)
- Publication date: November 1993
- Publication place: United States
- Media type: Print (Hardback)
- Pages: x, 424
- ISBN: 0-688-13174-3

The Iron Dragon's Daughter is a 1993 science fantasy novel by American writer Michael Swanwick. The story follows Jane, a changeling girl who slaves at a dragon factory in the world of Faerie, building part-magical, part-cybernetic monsters that are used as jet fighters. The plot of her story takes the form of a spiral, with events and characters constantly recurring in new settings.

The novel constantly subverts fantasy tropes and archetypes. Swanwick admits having written it both as a homage to J. R. R. Tolkien and in reaction to a handful of writers he claims exploit Tolkien's milieu and the readers' imaginations with derivative, commercial fantasy:

The recent slew of interchangeable Fantasy trilogies has hit me in much the same way that discovering that the woods I used to play in as a child have been cut down to make way for shoddy housing developments did.

The dragon Melanchthon is named after German theologian Philipp Melanchthon, an associate of Martin Luther. Further references to Lutheranism can be found in Swanwick's novel Jack Faust.

Swanwick has written two other books in the same setting, entitled The Dragons of Babel (published in 2008) and The Iron Dragon's Mother (published in 2019). Excerpts from The Dragons of Babel have periodically been published as short stories. They include King Dragon, The Word that Sings the Scythe, An Episode of Stardust, A Small Room in Koboldtown and Lord Weary's Empire. Most of these were originally published in Asimov's Science Fiction.

== Synopsis ==
The first portion of the story concerns Jane's childhood in a factory that builds iron dragons. Jane and her close friend Rooster, whose true name is Tetigistus, work in a group of indentured child laborers. Jane steals a grimoire, and after reading it, begins to hear the voice of an iron dragon in her head. Jane is taken to entertain an elderly, silent elf called the Baldwynn, but is told not to return after she witnesses a strange phenomenon. The dragon manipulates Rooster into trying to escape, but Rooster dies in the attempt. A distraught Jane forces the dragon to tell her his true name, Melanchthon. They then flee the factory.

Later, Jane attends high school while fixing a dormant Melanchthon, who was damaged in their escape. She discovers that the school principal is none other than the Baldwynn and becomes friends with her classmate Peter and his girlfriend Gwen, who, as the wicker queen, will soon be burned alive as a sacrifice to the Goddess. To Jane's shock, Peter tells her that his true name is Tetigistus. They confess their love and sleep together. Soon after, Gwen is sacrificed and Peter commits suicide out of guilt. Melanchthon disappears and Jane realizes that his manipulation caused these events.

Next, Jane goes to college to study alchemy. She makes new friends: Sirin, a talented alchemist, and Puck Aleshire, to whom she is strangely drawn. Jane discovers that Puck has the same soul as Peter and Rooster did: Tetigistus. She also suspects that Sirin might have the same soul as Gwen. Soon after, the Teind arrives, a night of chaos during which both Sirin and Puck die. Jane reunites with Melanchthon, who shows her that her life constantly spirals around to the same failures and reveals his ultimate plan to destroy the universe. Feeling her existence is futile, Jane agrees to help him.

Jane becomes a minor celebrity and serial killer, using the bodies of her victims as fuel for Melanchthon. She meets a dragon pilot named Rocket, who she realizes is another Tetigistus, and his half-sister Fata Incolore, true name Kunosoura, who shares a soul with Sirin and Gwen. Jane also encounters the Baldwynn, who shows her that her body in the human world is confined to a mental institution. After Jane sleeps with Rocket, she and Melanchthon enact their plan to destroy the universe. Rocket pursues them in his own dragon, and Jane is forced to blast him away, killing Tetigistus yet again. As they approach Spiral Castle, the center of the universe, Melanchthon dissolves around Jane and she realizes that their plan was doomed from the start.

Jane finds herself in Spiral Castle with the Baldwynn, who reveals that he's one of the Goddess's consorts and takes Jane to see her. The Goddess berates Jane for squandering the gift of her connection with Tetigistus and Kunosoura through her selfishness, causing Jane to have an existential crisis.

Afterwards, Jane is returned to the mortal world, unsure of whether or not she is being punished. She is released from the mental institution and goes on to obtain a doctorate in chemistry. While attending a party with a friend, Jane glimpses a man to whom she is instantly and desperately drawn. The novel ends, leaving it uncertain if Jane has finally reunited with Tetigistus and found a chance at redemption.

== Tone ==
Much of the novel is nihilistic in tone. Jane encounters Tetigistus and Kunosoura several times, and each time prioritizes her own survival, resulting in their deaths. She also fails to remain a moral protagonist, becoming a manipulative thief who is willing to kill to accomplish her goals. Melanchthon embodies nihilism and atheism, telling Jane that the Goddess is a myth and that the world comes to nothing:

Life exists, and all who live are born to suffer. The best moments are fleeting and bought with the coin of exquisite torment. All attachments end. All loved ones die. All that you value passes away. In such a vexatious existence laughter is madness and joy is folly. Shall we accept that it all happens for no reason, with no cause? That there is nobody to blame but ourselves but that accepting the responsibility is pointless for doing so cannot ease, defer, or deaden the pain? Not likely! It is so much more comforting to erect a straw figure on which to blame it all.

However, the novel ends on a cautiously optimistic note. Jane's encounter with the Goddess reveals that, in truth, there is order to the universe and that, though she squandered it, Jane did have a destiny. She refuses to answer Jane's questions on why the world is painful, whether choice is an illusion, and what the Goddess wants. Despite this, Jane comes to realize the Goddess's love for her and that her life in the human world "[is] not punishment." The final suggestion that Jane may be reunited with Tetigistus suggests that the Goddess has forgiven Jane and given her another chance to fulfill her purpose.

== Themes ==
Blood sacrifice is a constant presence in The Iron Dragon's Daughter. Two prominent examples are the sacrifice of the wicker queen, who is burned alive on Samhain, and the Teind, which claims one tenth of the students at Jane's university. It is never made clear whether or not these traditions are necessary to appease the Goddess. Other instances include the bodies of men being sacrificed to Melanchthon's hunger and the repeated sacrifice of Tetigistus's life in service of Jane's goals.

Materialism and consumerism also pervade the novel. The Faerie world is populated with familiar structures, including malls, from which Jane learns to shoplift. Throughout the novel, common material items are juxtaposed with mythological beings. As the wicker queen, Gwen becomes a celebrity, indulging in drugs and a lavish lifestyle before her death is broadcast as a live TV special. Jane observes a society of minuscule, ant-like creatures called meryons gradually grow from an agricultural bliss to a dystopia where the rich are protected and "tiny enemies of the state" are executed. When characters are injured or dreaming, they often spout off phrases that seem pulled from an advertisement. For example, when Rooster is in a coma during the opening of the novel:

Rooster groaned In a high, lucid voice, he said "Two all-beef patties, special sauce, lettuce, cheese..." Jane found herself unable to breathe. "... and a sesame seed bun." It was too awful, his lonely voice speaking to no one in the emptiness of the night. "Teflon."

Finally, virginity and the lack thereof are often addressed. Virginity seems required for many functions in the Faerie world. While Jane can pilot Melanchthon after she has lost her virginity, she cannot repair him, as the touch of a non-virgin will burn his wiring. Though the wicker queen need not remain a virgin, her consort is required to do so. When Peter and Jane have sex, he is rendered unable to perform his part of the sacrifice and must be replaced, to his shame. However, sex and sexuality also hold great power in The Iron Dragon's Daughter. While at university, Jane learns to use esoteric sex rituals for magical and alchemical purposes. Through these rituals, she is able to make a variety of discoveries and speak to her human mother in visions. Jane also uses her sexuality as a source of power in interpersonal relationships.

== Reception ==
The Iron Dragon's Daughter was lauded for its upheaval of fantasy tropes and its inventive style and narrative. Critic John Clute called the book an "anti-fantasy" and Kirkus described it as "seething, brain-bursting, all but indescribable." The novel was nominated for the Arthur C. Clarke Award, Locus Award, and World Fantasy Award for Best Novel in 1994. The New York Times named it a Notable Book in 1994.
