= Slow life (disambiguation) =

Slow life may refer to:

In culture:

- Slow living, living in a more balanced, meaningful, and life-affirming way
- Slow movement (culture), a global cultural movement that emphasizes a thoughtful, slower pace in a variety of social areas

In music:

- "Slow Life", a 2004 EP by Super Furry Animals
- "Slow Life", a song by Grizzly Bear (band)
- "Slow Life", a song by Jolin Tsai from Butterfly

In writing:

- "Slow Life" (novelette), a science fiction story by Michael Stanwick
