= The Dog Said Bow-Wow =

- Short story by Michael Swanwick
- Country: United States
- Language: English
- Genre: Science fiction

Publication
- Published in: Asimov's Science Fiction
- Publication type: magazine
- Publication date: October/November 2001

"The Dog Said Bow-Wow" is a science fiction short story by American writer Michael Swanwick, published in 2001. It won the 2002 Hugo Award for Best Short Story and was nominated for the 2002 Nebula Award for Best Short Story. The Dog Said Bow-Wow is the title story of his 2007 short story collection, published by Tachyon Publications, and was reprinted in the same year in Rewired: The Post-Cyberpunk Anthology.

== Plot summary ==
"The Dog Said Bow-Wow" follows the story of Sir Blackthorpe Ravenscairn de Plus Precieux (better known as "Surplus"), a genetically engineered talking dog of human intelligence, and Aubrey Darger, his partner in crime. Together they create a plan to con several high officials of Buckingham Palace out of their wealth. The story is set in a not-very-distant future after a war between humankind and its artificial intelligence creations in which humans won, but civilization as we know it was forced to revert to an early Victorian era level of communications technology.

== The collection ==
The collection The Dog Said Bow-Wow contains the following stories:

- "'Hello,' Said the Stick" (Hugo Nominee for Short Story 2003, Locus Nominee for Short Story 2003)
- "The Dog Said Bow-Wow" (Hugo Winner for Short Story 2002, Nebula Nominee for Short Story 2003, Locus Nominee for Short Story 2002)
- "Slow Life" (Hugo Winner for Novelette 2003, Locus Nominee for Novelette 2003)
- "Triceratops Summer" (Locus Nominee for Short Story 2006)
- "Tin Marsh" (Locus Nominee 2007)
- "An Episode of Stardust"
- "The Skysailor's Tale" (Locus Nominee for Novelette 2008
- "Legions in Time" (Hugo Winner for Novelette 2004, Locus Nominee for Novelette 2004)
- "The Little Cat Laughed to See Such Sport" (Hugo Nominee for Short Story 2003, Locus Nominee for Short Story 2003)
- "The Bordello in Faerie"
- "The Last Geek" (Locus Nominee for Short Story 2005)
- "Girls and Boys, Come Out to Play" (Locus Nominee for Novelette 2006)
- "A Great Day for Brontosaurs"
- "Dirty Little War" (Locus Nominee for Short Story 2003)
- "A Small Room in Koboldtown" (Hugo Nominee for Short Story 2008, Locus Winner for Short Story 2008)
- "Urdumheim" (Locus Nominee for Novelette 2008)

== Related stories ==
Swanwick has since written several more Darger and Surplus stories. As of 2020, the complete list is as follows:

- Short stories
  - "The Dog Said Bow-Wow" (2001 short story)
  - "Smoke and Mirrors: Four Scenes from the Post-Utopian Future" (2003 short story, composed of four vignettes):
    - "The Song of the Lorelei"
    - "American Cigarettes"
    - "The Brain-Baron"
    - "The Nature of Mirrors"
  - "The Little Cat Laughed to See Such Sport" (2002 short story)
  - Dancing with Bears (2011 novel)
  - "Girls and Boys, Come Out to Play" (2005 short story)
  - Chasing the Phoenix (2015 novel)
  - "Tawny Petticoats" (2014 short story)
  - "There Was An Old Woman..." (2020 short story)
- Novels

Chronologically, "The Little Cat" is followed by Dancing with Bears, then Chasing the Phoenix, and then "Tawny Petticoats".

"Smoke and Mirrors" was published in the collection Live Without a Net edited by Lou Anders; the stories also had very limited availability in handmade chapbooks sold by Swanwick's wife.

"The Little Cat Laughed to See Such Sport" is available online, published to promote the release of "Dancing with Bears".

"Tawny Petticoats" was published in the collection Rogues edited by George R.R. Martin.
