= Puck Aleshire's Abecedary =

an interior illustration

Puck Aleshire's Abecedary (2000) by Michael Swanwick, a collection of short-short stories (one for each letter of the alphabet), initially ran in The New York Review of Science Fiction at a rate of one per month for 26 months starting with Issue 111, November 1997. Each story was accompanied by a collage illustration by the journal's editor Kathryn Cramer. Dragon Press collected these stories in a single volume entitled Puck Aleshire’s Abecedary.

There were two editions, a carefully handbound edition produced for Dragon Press by Henry Wessels with linen cloth spine with handmade paper-covered boards and endpapers with deckled edge and a trade paperback edition printed by Odyssey Press in New Hampshire.

Cover art, interior illustration, and book design of both editions are by Kathryn Cramer. Swanwick published a subsequent volume of short-shorts, which initially appeared on the website The Infinite Matrix and were collected as The Periodic Table of Science Fiction.

== See also ==
- Flash fiction
