= Ancient Engines =

- Short story by Michael Swanwick
- Language: English
- Genre: Science fiction

Publication
- Published in: Asimov's Science Fiction
- Publication type: Magazine
- Publication date: February 1999

"Ancient Engines" is a science fiction short story by American writer Michael Swanwick, published in 1999. It was nominated for the 2000 Hugo Award for Best Short Story as well as the 1999 Nebula Award for Best Short Story.

== Plot summary ==
The story begins when a drunken human insults a mech in a bar. The resulting fight nearly kills the human, who is saved only by the mech's kindness. As the mech starts to leave he is invited to sit and talk with an old man and his granddaughter. They have a discussion about what it would really take to build a machine that would last forever.

== See also ==
- Long Now Foundation - The foundation has several ongoing projects, including a 10,000-year clock.
