= The Dragons of Babel =

2008 novel by Michael Swanwick

- First edition
- Author: Michael Swanwick
- Cover artist: Stephan Martiniere
- Language: English
- Genre: Science fantasy
- Publisher: Tor Books
- Publication date: January 2008
- Publication place: United States
- Media type: Print (Hardback)
- Pages: 320
- ISBN: 0-7653-1950-0 (hardcover)
- OCLC: 156818846
- Dewey Decimal: 813/.54 22
- LC Class: PS3569.W28 D73 2008

The Dragons of Babel is a 2008 science fantasy novel by American author Michael Swanwick, set in the same world as his earlier work The Iron Dragon's Daughter (1993). It follows the plight of a young man named Will Le Fey after a crippled dragon takes up residence in his town and inside his mind. Like The Iron Dragon's Daughter, the novel subverts fantasy tropes while it explores the extremely dark and gritty world of Faerie.

The Dragons of Babel was nominated for the Locus Award for Best Fantasy Novel in 2009.

== Plot ==
Following the same time period as The Iron Dragon's Daughter; a crippled dragon crawls to a village in Avalon, somewhere in Faerie minor, and crowns himself king. He makes young Will his lieutenant and by night, he crawls in the young fey's mind to get a measure of what his subjects think. But, the dragon’s arrival sets Will on a life-changing adventure where he will encounter danger, deceit, and a truth that was conceived with his birth.

Later on, Will travels with Centaurs, acquires a surrogate daughter named Esme who has no memory of her past and may be immortal, witnesses the clash of Giants, and travels to Babel as a refugee. There, Will rises as underground politician, and finds his one true love, a high elven woman to whom he dare not aspire.
