= Wetware (brain) =

Term drawn from the idea of hardware or software

Wetware is a term drawn from the computer-related idea of hardware or software, but applied to biological life forms.

== Usage ==
The prefix "wet" is a reference to the water found in living creatures. Wetware is used to describe the elements equivalent to hardware and software found in a person, especially the central nervous system (CNS) and the human mind. The term wetware finds use in works of fiction, in scholarly publications and in popularizations.

The "hardware" component of wetware concerns the bioelectric and biochemical properties of the CNS, specifically the brain. If the sequence of impulses traveling across the various neurons are thought of symbolically as software, then the physical neurons would be the hardware. The amalgamated interaction of this software and hardware is manifested through continuously changing physical connections, and chemical and electrical influences that spread across the body. The process by which the mind and brain interact to produce the collection of experiences that we define as self-awareness is in question.

== History ==
Although the exact definition has shifted over time, the term Wetware and its fundamental reference to "the physical mind" has been around at least since the mid-1950s. Mostly used in relatively obscure articles and papers, it was not until the heyday of cyberpunk, however, that the term found broad adoption. Among the first uses of the term in popular culture was the Bruce Sterling novel Schismatrix (1985) and the Michael Swanwick novel Vacuum Flowers (1987).

Rudy Rucker references the term in a number of books, including one entitled Wetware (1988):

... all sparks and tastes and tangles, all its stimulus/response patterns – the whole bio-cybernetic software of mind.

Rucker did not use the word to simply mean a brain, nor in the human-resources sense of employees. He used wetware to stand for the data found in any biological system, analogous perhaps to the firmware that is found in a ROM chip. In Rucker's sense, a seed, a plant graft, an embryo, or a biological virus are all wetware. DNA, the immune system, and the evolved neural architecture of the brain are further examples of wetware in this sense.

Rucker describes his conception in a 1992 compendium The Mondo 2000 User's Guide to the New Edge, which he quotes in a 2007 blog entry.

Early cyber-guru Arthur Kroker used the term in his blog.

With the term getting traction in trendsetting publications, it became a buzzword in the early 1990s. In 1991, Dutch media theorist Geert Lovink organized the Wetware Convention in Amsterdam, which was supposed to be an antidote to the "out-of-body" experiments conducted in high-tech laboratories, such as experiments in virtual reality.

Timothy Leary, in an appendix to Info-Psychology originally written in 1975–76 and published in 1989, used the term wetware, writing that "psychedelic neuro-transmitters were the hot new technology for booting-up the 'wetware' of the brain". Another common reference is: "Wetware has 7 plus or minus 2 temporary registers." The numerical allusion is to a classic 1957 article by George A. Miller, The magical number 7 plus or minus two: some limits in our capacity for processing information, which later gave way to Miller's law.

== See also ==
- Biological computing
- Biopunk
- Brain–computer interface
- Brain in a vat
- Cybernetics
- Cyberware
- Biohacker
- Grindhouse Wetware
- Intelligence amplification
- Liveware
- Meatspace
- Neurotechnology
- Philosophy of mind
- Wetware computer
