= Bones of the Earth =

2002 novel by Michael Swanwick

- Cover of first edition (hardcover)
- Author: Michael Swanwick
- Cover artist: Joe DeVito
- Language: English
- Genre: Science fiction, paleontology novel
- Publisher: Eos (HarperCollins)
- Publication date: 2002
- Publication place: United States
- Media type: Print (hardback & paperback)
- Pages: 335 (1st edition)
- ISBN: 0-380-97836-9 (1st edition)
- OCLC: 47056437
- Dewey Decimal: 813/.54 21
- LC Class: PS3569.W28 B66 2002

Bones of the Earth is a 2002 science fiction novel by Michael Swanwick. It was nominated for the Nebula Award for Best Novel in 2002, and the Hugo, Campbell, and Locus Awards in 2003.

== Plot setting ==
Expanded from his Hugo Award-winning story "Scherzo with Tyrannosaur", Bones of the Earth spans geologic time, not just centuries but millennia, from the prehistoric past to the distant and unknown future. Most of the novel's events take place in the age of the dinosaurs. The "bones" of the title refer to the time traveling team players described in the story that study throughout Earth's history and prehistory.

== Plot summary ==
Paleontologist Richard Leyster has reached the pinnacle of his profession: a position with the Smithsonian Museum plus a groundbreaking dinosaur fossil site he can research, publish on, and learn from for years to come. There is nothing that could lure him away – until a disturbingly secretive stranger named Harry Griffin enters Leyster's office with an ice cooler and a job offer.

In the cooler is the head of a freshly killed stegosaurus. Griffin has been entrusted with an extraordinary gift; an impossible technology on loan to humanity for an undisclosed purpose from beings known to a select few as the Unchanging. The only stipulation is: not to alter recorded history. If the taboo is broken, the contract becomes null and void.

Time travel has become a reality millions of years before it rationally could be. With it, Richard Leyster and his colleagues make their most cherished fantasies come true. They study dinosaurs up close, in their own time and environment. Also, individual lives have the freedom to turn back on themselves. People meet, shake hands, and converse with their younger or older versions at various crossroads in time. One wrong word, a single misguided act, could be disastrous to the project and to the world. Griffin's job is to make sure everything that is supposed to happen does happen, no matter who is destined to be hurt – or die.

Then there is Dr. Gertrude Salley, an intelligent rebel in a community of "bone men" and women. Alternately, both Leyster's and Griffin's chief rival colleague, despised nemesis, and inscrutable lover at various punctures throughout time, Salley is constantly driven to tamper with the mechanisms of natural law, trespassing in forbidden areas, and pushing paradox to the edge no matter what. And, when they face massive beasts, it results in a team of "bone men" becoming stranded for two years in the Mesozoic Era.

Apart from failed attempts to rescue the team from the past, slowly, something begins to happen. The temporal mechanics are altered in such a way that two time streams emerge. The first focuses on the struggling team in the Mesozoic's Maastrichtian Age, some 65 million years ago. In the far future, in what will be known as the Telezoic Era, a younger version of Gertrude Salley meets an older version of herself – the one who was responsible for the split in the timeline – now unhappily living in the center of the new supercontinent of Ultima Pangea. There, they also finally meet the mysterious benefactors who are actually an evolved avian species that inherited the Earth upon the extinction of the human race.

Preparing to beg the evolved avians not to shut down the whole enterprise of time travel and the sciences based upon it, Gertrude also discovers their apparent fascination with humanity and that their gift of time travel was simply a means to study the human race in their own right. She also realizes the difficulty in the ability of the incomprehensible far-future species to forgive, for incomprehensible reasons, the creation of a deeply dangerous timeline anomaly back in the 21st century. However, the team trapped in the Maastrichtian Age makes a remarkable discovery.

One of the team members arrives at a genuinely unique explanation for the Cretaceous–Paleogene extinction event. They had already determined that predator dinosaurs farm and ranch their prey, singing infrasound commands that lead their ultimate prey to green pastures. One of the team speculated that dinosaur migration might be similarly controlled by the song of the Earth, the song of tectonic plates shifting in the crust of the planet. And the possibility of the Chicxulub impactor having been so great as to detune the song of the Earth for a decade or a century, deafening the dinosaurs so they could not migrate, causing them to starve.

In the end, the evolved avians decide to retroactively remove the time travel science from human hands, thereby rendering all of the events up to that point irrelevant. But, out of the ashes of this paradox, its tangles and attenuations mercifully forgotten, a love of the world is retained – a deep unselfish love of learning the world and all its creatures.
