= The Dead (Swanwick short story) =

1996 short story by Michael Swanwick

- Short story by Michael Swanwick
- Language: English
- Genre(s): Science fiction

Publication
- Published in: Starlight 1
- Publication type: Book
- Publication date: 1996

"The Dead" is a science fiction short story by American writer Michael Swanwick, published in 1996. It is set in a future in which dead people can be revived to work as zombies.

It was nominated for the 1997 Hugo Award for Best Short Story and the 1998 Nebula Award for Best Short Story.

== Plot summary ==
The story begins with Donald having dinner with his ex-lover Courtney, who tries to headhunt him for a company called Koestler Biological. She reveals that Koestler has found a cheap way to produce zombies, turning them from luxury products to cheap and reliable replacements for blue-collar laborers. To convince Donald to join, she takes him to a bare-knuckle fight in which a zombie defeats a living fighter.

Donald decides to take the job. When he returns to his hotel, he finds a zombie sex worker in his room, and confronts Courtney. She also has a zombie, which beats him and throws him out. The story ends with Donald thinking about the millions of working class people who will now be unable to get jobs, and wondering it they will rise up against corporations.

== Themes ==
"The Dead" has been read from a socioeconomic perspective. In an article about zombie fiction for the Financial Times, James Lovegrove described the dead as the social underclass. In interviews, Swanwick has described it as a story about capitalism, relating it to other science fiction stories inspired by Karl Marx, such as J. G. Ballard's "The Subliminal Man". It has also been described as a critique of late twentieth century capitalism and its uncaring, soulless nature, for which the dead are metaphors. Nonetheless, there may be hope for humanity. The same paper uses the story to demonstrate I. A. Richards' practical criticism and the ideas of sense and intention.

The themes of sports, sex, and physicality have also been examined. Derek Thiess notes that while athletes are typically seen as domineeringly masculine, their consent is frequently elided, especially in the context of American college sports. In the boxing scene, the zombie fighter’s calm is superficially disorienting but fits the paradigm of the hegemonised athlete. On the other hand, the human fighter refuses either to surrender or to consent, instead acquiescing to the greater power. Thiess also notes a reference to the Haitian zombie in this scene. The paper compares the fight with the scene where Donald confronts Courtney: her zombie is unable to consent, and when he beats Donald the chief power relations are corporate rather than personal. In their previous sexual relationship, Donald manipulated Courtney; now she is his boss she is able to control both him and her zombie. Their situations have shifted, but the fundamental power relations are still present. Thiess states that the story extends the discourses about sexual violence, allowing readers to re-examine these discourses.

== Reception ==
"The Dead" was republished in The Year's Best Science Fiction: Fourteenth Annual Collection, edited by Gardner Dozois, and in Best of the Best: 20 Years of the Year's Best Science Fiction, an anthology chosen from previous entries in the Year’s Best Science Fiction series. It was also reprinted in Nebula Awards 33. It has been translated into Croatian, French, Italian, and German.

It was nominated for the 1997 Hugo Award for Best Short Story and the 1998 Nebula Award for Best Short Story. It was fourth place in the 1997 Locus Award for Short Story. It was also placed on the 1996 James Tiptree Jr. Award (now the Otherwise Award) Long List. Judge Karen Joy Fowler called it an "intense disturbing story written in Swanwick’s usual elegant ice."
