= Legions in Time =

- Short story by Michael Swanwick
- Genre: Science fiction

Publication
- Publisher: Asimov's Science Fiction
- Publication date: April 2003

"Legions in Time" is a science fiction novelette by Michael Swanwick, originally published in the April 2003 issue of Asimov's Science Fiction. It won the Hugo Award for Best Novelette in 2004. The story was reprinted in Science Fiction: The Best of 2003 and in several other collections and anthologies. It has been translated into Spanish, French and Italian.

Swanwick wrote that his story was inspired by A. E. Van Vogt's "Recruiting Station", "which just speeds along like a racehorse afire, and thought I'd try to write something similar."

== Plot summary ==
A widow with the strange job of sitting in an empty office and guarding an empty closet, decides to take action and steps through—and falls into a cosmic, time-spanning adventure that ends with her becoming an entire organization spread throughout time with a goal of destroying the evil Empire of the Aftermen.
