= Nebula Awards Showcase 2000 =

2000 anthology edited by Gregory Benford

- Cover of first edition
- Editor: Gregory Benford
- Cover artist: Ellen Schuster
- Language: English
- Series: Nebula Awards Showcase
- Genre: Science fiction
- Publisher: Harcourt
- Publication date: 2000
- Publication place: United States
- Media type: Print (hardcover)
- Pages: xxiii, 288
- ISBN: 0-15-100479-X
- Preceded by: Nebula Awards 33
- Followed by: Nebula Awards Showcase 2001

Nebula Awards Showcase 2000 is an anthology of science fiction short works edited by Gregory Benford. It was first published in hardcover and trade paperback by Harcourt in April 2000.

== Summary ==
The book collects pieces that won or were nominated for the Nebula Awards for best novel, novella, novelette and short story for the year 1999, a profile of 1999 grand master winner Hal Clement and a representative early story by him, and various other nonfiction pieces related to the awards, together with the Rhysling Award-winning poems for 1998 and an introduction by the editor. Not all nominees for the various awards are included, and the best novel is represented by an excerpt.

== Contents ==
- "Introduction: The Science Fictional Century" (Gregory Benford)
- "Reading the Bones" [Best Novella winner, 1999] (Sheila Finch)
- "Lost Girls" [Best Novelette winner, 1999] (Jane Yolen)
- "Thirteen Ways to Water" [Best Short Story winner, 1999] (Bruce Holland Rogers)
- Forever Peace (excerpt) [Best Novel winner, 1999] (Joe Haldeman)
- "Genre and Genesis: A Discussion of Science Fiction's Literary Role" [essay] (Bill Warren, David Hartwell, George Zebrowski, Gordon Van Gelder and Jonathan Lethem)
- "Respectability" [essay] (Gordon Van Gelder)
- "Gatekeepers and Literary Bigots" [essay] (George Zebrowski)
- "Good News About SF in Bad Publishing Times" (David Hartwell)
- "The Truth About Sci-Fi Movies, Revealed at Last" [essay] (Bill Warren)
- "Why Can't We All Just Live Together?: A Vision of Genre Paradise Lost" [essay] (Jonathan Lethem)
- "Winter Fire" [Best Short Story nominee, 1999] (Geoffrey A. Landis)
- "Lethe" [Best Novelette nominee, 1999] (Walter Jon Williams)
- "The Mercy Gate" [Best Novelette nominee, 1999] (Mark J. McGarry)
- "The 1998 Author Emeritus: William Tenn" [essay] (George Zebrowski)
- "My Life and Hard Times in SF" [essay] (William Tenn)
- "The Grand Master Award: Hal Clement" [essay] (Poul Anderson)
- "Uncommon Sense" (Hal Clement)
- "Rhysling Award Winners" [essay] (John Grey and Laurel Winter)
- "Explaining Frankenstein to His Mother" [Rhysling Award - Best Short Poem winner, 1998] (John Grey)
- "why goldfish shouldn't use power tools" [Rhysling Award - Best Long Poem winner, 1998] (Laurel Winter)

== Reception ==
Kirkus Reviews called the collection "[i]nvaluable, not just for the splendid fiction and lively nonfiction, but as another annual snapshot, complete with grins and scowls." The reviewer notes that "Jonathan Lethem kicks off this year's debate with his complaint that SF lost all hope of claiming literary respectability when in 1973 the SFWA voted Arthur C. Clarke's Rendezvous with Rama Best Novel, rather than Thomas Pynchon's Gravity's Rainbow. Rejoinders in various hues issue from Gordon van Gelder and George Zebrowski—although nobody sees fit to remark on this year's Best Novel, where nostalgia beat out one of the finest, most wrenching SF novels ever written, J. R. Dunn's Days of Cain."

Ray Olson in The Booklist also notes the debate begun by Lethem, observing that it and the nonfiction pieces on publishing and movies, along with William Tenn's speech, "fairly steal the award-winning stories' thunder," as does the reprinted 1946 Hal Clement story. "Still, the winners ... aren't bad."

Kurt Lancaster in the Christian Science Monitor calls Benford's introduction "helpful" and comments in detail on the pieces by Haldeman, Finch, Yolen and Rogers, noting that "[i]n all of these stories, the theme of the spirit of humanity transcends the limitations the characters have imposed on themselves, as they discover something new about themselves and their relationship to others."

Marta Boswell in The Missouri Review finds the volume's editorial commentary "reeks of [a] 'those-were-the-good-old-days' attitude," nostalgic "for the era when SF writers were 'the bards of science.'" That said, "the fiction itself is, for the most part, fresh and interesting." Boswell singles out the Haldeman excerpt and the Williams story, which she calls "my favorite of the collection" for particular praise. She also comments positively on the Yolen, McGarry and Landis pieces, while deeming Finch's and Rogers' less successful.

The anthology was also reviewed by Gary K. Wolfe in Locus #471, April 2000, and Greg L. Johnson in The New York Review of Science Fiction, September 2000.
