= Stations of the Tide =

1990 science fiction novel by Michael Swanwick

- Cover of first edition (hardcover)
- Author: Michael Swanwick
- Cover artist: Daniel Horne
- Language: English
- Genre: Science fiction
- Publisher: William Morrow and Company
- Publication date: 1991
- Publication place: United States
- Media type: Print (hardback & paperback)
- Pages: 252
- ISBN: 0-688-10451-7
- OCLC: 22207452
- Dewey Decimal: 813/.54 20
- LC Class: PS3569.W28 S7 1991

Stations of the Tide is a science fiction novel by American author Michael Swanwick. Prior to being published in book form in 1991, it was serialized in Isaac Asimov's Science Fiction Magazine in two parts, starting in mid-December 1990.

It won the Nebula Award for Best Novel in 1991, was nominated for the Hugo and Campbell Awards in 1992, and was nominated for the Arthur C. Clarke Award in 1993.

Stations of the Tide is the story of an unnamed bureaucrat with the Department of Technology Transfer who is on the planet Miranda hunting a magician who has smuggled proscribed technology, seeking to bring him to justice before the world is transformed by the flood of the Jubilee Tides.
