= Nebula Awards Showcase 2002 =

2002 anthology edited by Kim Stanley Robinson

- Cover of first edition
- Editor: Kim Stanley Robinson
- Cover artist: Ray Lundgren
- Language: English
- Series: Nebula Awards Showcase
- Genre: Science fiction
- Publisher: Roc/New American Library
- Publication date: 2002
- Publication place: United States
- Media type: Print (paperback)
- Pages: 292 pp.
- ISBN: 0-451-45878-8
- Preceded by: Nebula Awards Showcase 2001
- Followed by: Nebula Awards Showcase 2003

Nebula Awards Showcase 2002 is an anthology of award-winning science fiction short works edited by Kim Stanley Robinson. It was first published in trade paperback by Roc/New American Library in April 2002.

== Summary ==
The book collects pieces that won or were nominated for the Nebula Awards for best novel, novella, novelette and short story for the year 2001, tributes to 2001 Grand Master winner Philip José Farmer and Author Emeritus Robert Sheckley, and a commentary on the current state of science fiction by various authors, together with an introduction by the editor. Not all nominees for the various awards are included, and the best novel is represented by an excerpt.

== Contents ==
- "Introduction" (Kim Stanley Robinson)
- "Philip José Farmer: An Appreciation" [essay] (Robert Silverberg)
- "Robert Sheckley: An Appreciation" [essay] (David G. Hartwell)
- "Daddy's World" [Best Novelette winner, 2001] (Walter Jon Williams)
- Darwin's Radio (excerpt) [Best Novel winner, 2001] (Greg Bear)
- "macs" [Best Short Story winner, 2001] (Terry Bisson)
- "Stellar Harvest" [Best Novelette nominee, 2001] (Eleanor Arnason)
- "Goddesses" [Best Novella winner, 2001] (Linda Nagata)
- "Commentary: Science Fiction and the World" [essay] (Gwyneth Jones, Andy Duncan, Damon Knight, Gene Wolfe, Kathleen Ann Goonan, Ken MacLeod, Paul McAuley, Nalo Hopkinson and John Clute)
- "A Knight of Ghosts and Shadows" [Best Novelette nominee, 2001] (Gardner Dozois)

== Reception ==
John Mark Eberhart in The Kansas City Star opines that "if you believe in good, solid science fiction and fantasy, this volume's for you." He highlights the pieces by Bear and Nagata, and the commentaries of Duncan, Clute and Knight, whom he notes has recently died.

Lesley S.J. Farmer in KLIATT writes that "[t]he current winners generally have a dark humor or philosophical 'bent.' ... Several of these works carry the sense of being parts of larger efforts, [and] so sometimes feel incomplete. Still, they provide an interesting look into today's approach to the genre, particularly according to the views of peer authors." The pieces by Williams, Bear, Bisson, Arnason, Nagata, and Dozois are singled out for comment.

The anthology was also reviewed by Philip Snyder in SFRA Review no. 258, 2002, and Gary K. Wolfe in Locus no. 496, May 2002.

== Awards ==
The book placed fifteenth in the 2003 Locus Poll Award for Best Anthology.
