= The Very Pulse of the Machine =

1998 Michael Swanwick science fiction short story

- Short story by Michael Swanwick
- Country: United States
- Language: English
- Genre: Science fiction

Publication
- Published in: Asimov's Science Fiction
- Publication type: Magazine
- Publication date: February 1998

"The Very Pulse of the Machine" is a science fiction short story by American writer Michael Swanwick, published in 1998. It was the winner of the 1999 Hugo Award for Best Short Story. It was also nominated for the 1999 Locus Award for Best Short Story and Asimov's Science Fiction magazine's Reader Poll. In 2022, the story was adapted into an episode of the Netflix anthology series Love, Death & Robots.

== Plot summary ==
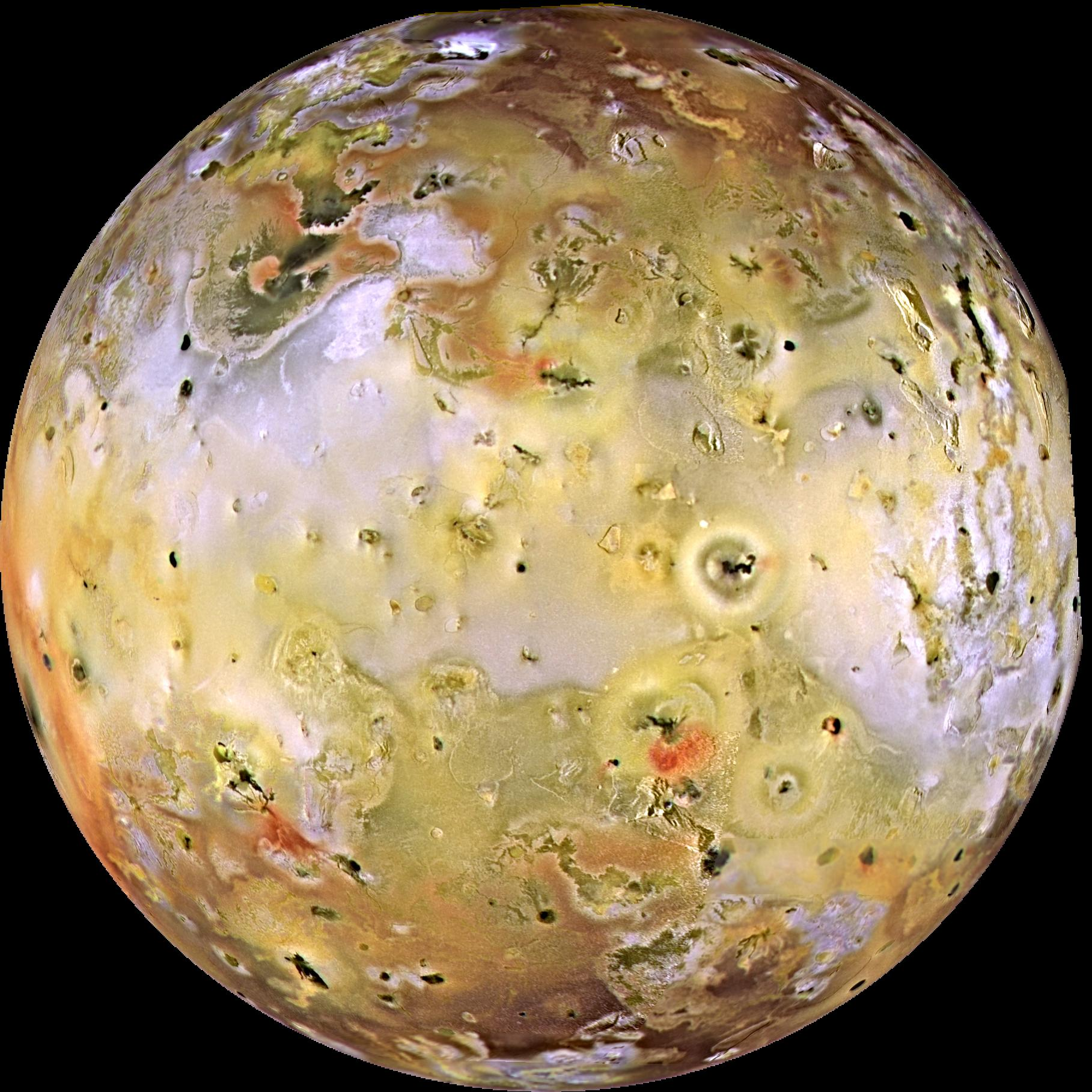
Io, where the story takes place.

The story follows Martha Kivelsen, an astronaut who is in a moon rover crash while exploring the surface of Jupiter’s moon Io. The rover is destroyed, so Kivelsen decides to make a sledge from the rover's parts and drag her partner Burton’s body back to the lander before her air supply runs out. She has no time to sleep so she takes drugs to keep her awake and give her energy, but they cause her to hallucinate. Along the way she hears a voice in her radio claiming to be Io, which is actually a machine, using Burton's body to communicate. When Kivelsen is trapped on the wrong side of a lake, Io claims it can help her cross it, and sulfur crystals make a narrow bridge over the lake. However, where Kivelsen is nearly at the lander, it is destroyed by a quake, stranding her without air. Io states it may be able to give her and Burton a form of immortality, and Kivelsen directs Io to use its flux tube to tell the rest of the Solar System about her discovery. Then she accepts the offer and jumps into a pool of molten sulfur. Whether or not she is hallucinating remains ambiguous.

== Quotations ==
Burton is a poetry enthusiast, and Io (or Kivelsen's hallucinations) quotes several poets, including Dylan Thomas, Sylvia Plath, Alfred, Lord Tennyson, and Edmund Hamilton Sears. It quotes several Romantic poems: Samuel Taylor Coleridge's The Rime of the Ancient Mariner, and two by William Wordsworth: The Prelude and the love poem "She Was a Phantom of Delight", from which the story takes its title.

The narration also describes Io's scenery by referring to The Wizard of Oz. While Kivelsen thinks about why she is retrieving Burton's body, she mentions the Baltimore Catechism.
