= Scherzo with Tyrannosaur =

- Short story by Michael Swanwick
- Cover of the issue in which "Scherzo with Tyrannosaur" first appeared; the couple at the bottom right are Swanwick and his wife Marianne Porter.
- Language: English
- Genre: Science fiction

Publication
- Published in: Asimov's Science Fiction
- Publication type: Magazine
- Publication date: July 1999

"Scherzo with Tyrannosaur" is a science fiction short story by American writer Michael Swanwick, published in 1999 and later expanded into the novel Bones of the Earth. It won the 2000 Hugo Award for Best Short Story, was nominated for the Nebula Award, placed third in the 2000 Locus Poll, and placed fourth in the Asimov's Science Fiction Reader Poll.

== Plot summary ==
The story follows the paleontological director of Hilltop Station, a research center set in the late Cretaceous period. It begins as Hilltop Station throws a fund raising ball and the director must keep patrons happy as well as prevent employees from illegally using their knowledge of the past for profit. When the director engages in unethical activities, he is forced to cover his tracks with complex time paradoxes and visits from his future self.
