= Gravity's Angels =

1991 collection of science fiction stories by Michael Swanwick

- Dust-jacket illustration by Pablo Picasso.
- Author: Michael Swanwick
- Illustrator: Janet Aulisio
- Cover artist: Pablo Picasso
- Language: English
- Genre: Science fiction, cyberpunk
- Publisher: Arkham House
- Publication date: 1991
- Publication place: United States
- Media type: Print (hardback)
- Pages: x, 302
- ISBN: 0-87054-162-5
- OCLC: 22766648
- Dewey Decimal: 813/.54 20
- LC Class: PS3569.W28 G7 1991

Gravity's Angels is a collection of science fiction stories by American writer Michael Swanwick. It was released in 1991, and was the author's first book published by Arkham House. It was published in an edition of 4,119 copies. The stories originally appeared in Isaac Asimov's Science Fiction Magazine, Omni, and other magazines.

== Contents ==
Gravity's Angels contains the following stories:

- "A Midwinter's Tale"
- "The Feast of Saint Janis"
- "The Blind Minotaur"
- "The Transmigration of Philip K"
- "Covenant of Souls"
- "The Dragon Line"
- "Mummer Kiss"
- "Trojan Horse"
- "Snow Angels"
- "The Man Who Met Picasso"
- "Foresight"
- "Ginungagap"
- "The Edge of the World"

== Sources ==
- Chalker, Jack L.; Mark Owings (1998). The Science-Fantasy Publishers: A Bibliographic History, 1923-1998. Westminster, MD and Baltimore: Mirage Press, Ltd. p. 58.
- Joshi, S.T. (1999). Sixty Years of Arkham House: A History and Bibliography. Sauk City, WI: Arkham House. p. 162. ISBN 0-87054-176-5.
- Nielsen, Leon (2004). Arkham House Books: A Collector's Guide. Jefferson, NC and London: McFarland & Company, Inc. p. 137. ISBN 0-7864-1785-4.
