= Vacuum Flowers =

1987 novel by Michael Swanwick

- First edition (publ. Arbor House)
- Author: Michael Swanwick
- Cover artist: Rich O'Donnell
- Language: English
- Genre: Cyberpunk
- Publisher: Arbor House
- Publication date: 1987
- Publication place: United States
- Pages: 248
- ISBN: 9780877958703

Vacuum Flowers is a science fiction novel by American writer Michael Swanwick, published in 1987. It is an early example of the cyberpunk genre, and features one of the earliest uses of the concept of wetware.

== Plot summary ==
The protagonist of the novel is Rebel Elizabeth Mudlark, the recorded personality of a dead woman which has become the property of a corporation that intends to sell it as entertainment. Rebel escapes by taking over the body of Eucrasia Walsh, a woman who rents herself out for temporary testing of new wetware programming. While escaping the corporation Eucrasia's latent personality is beginning to reassert itself.

Rebel's adventures take her throughout the widely colonized Solar System. She initially lives in canister worlds orbiting the Sun in a trojan orbit, where she sometimes works removing bioengineered weeds (vacuum flowers, the space-tolerant flora of the title) from the canisters' exterior ports. Since the recording omits most of her memories, she must rely on strangers to help her survive, though she cannot trust any of them. Rebel meets and falls in love with Wyeth, a leader whose personality was reprogrammed into a team of four complementary personas. Together they form an uneasy alliance with The Comprise, the hive mind which rules Earth, and encounter Dysonworlders, who live on genetically engineered artificial comets (Dyson trees).

== Reception ==
Despite the lack of cyberware in this book, Chris Hockabout called it "strangely cyberpunk" and noted that "the lack of any real cyberware does little to stop this crisply told story from taking you away. Where the hardware is lacking, there is plenty going on in the mind-based arts." Hockabout liked the various elements of the story, commenting, "Artificial intelligence, back-stabbing, mysterious benefactors, and a new element, the hive intelligence, add spice to the life of the heroine." Hockabout concluded by giving this novel a rating of 3.5 out of 5.

== Sources ==
- Swanwick, Michael (1988). Vacuum Flowers. Penguin Group (USA) Incorporated. ISBN 0-441-85876-7.
