= The Periodic Table of Science Fiction =

- First edition
- Author: Michael Swanwick
- Language: English
- Genre: Science fiction
- Publisher: PS Publishing
- Publication date: July 1, 2005
- Publication place: United Kingdom
- Media type: Print (Slipcased hardcover, hardcover)
- Pages: 274 (hardcover)
- ISBN: 1-904619-01-0 (slipcase), ISBN 1-904619-00-2 (hardcover)
- OCLC: 69021516

The Periodic Table of Science Fiction is a collection of 118 very short stories by science fiction author Michael Swanwick. Each story is named after an element in the periodic table, including the then-undiscovered element 117.

The stories were commissioned to run on Eileen Gunn's The Infinite Matrix but were published in the Sci Fiction section of SciFi.com, between 2001 and 2003. The stories were published as they were written, about which Swanwick said, "It made the sequence into a kind of performance art, something akin to being a trapeze artist, which is a possibility not normally open to a writer."

The print edition was published in 2005, in two signed limited editions: one slipcase hardback edition with a print run of 200, and one hardback edition with a print run of 500 books. In 2009, Swanwick posted the stories on a weblog dedicated to the purpose.

The theme of each story in the collection is inspired by the element it is named after. The book also includes an afterword by the author, and a foreword by Theodore Gray who was awarded the Ig Nobel Prize for Chemistry in 2002.
