= Slow Life (novelette) =

- Short story by Michael Swanwick
- Genre: Science fiction

Publication
- Publisher: Analog Science Fiction
- Publication date: December 2002

"Slow Life" is a science fiction novelette by American writer Michael Swanwick, originally published in the December 2002 issue of Analog Science Fiction. It won the Hugo Award for Best Novelette in 2003.

The story is set on Titan. The author wrote: "I liked Titan specifically because there was a lot known about its chemistry and geography, but most people were not familiar with it, so a story set there would feel fresh to them."

== Plot summary ==
The first explorers on Titan find that the ocean is a weird chemical soup. There does not seem to be any life in it until one of the expedition members begins to believe that something is talking to her through her dreams.

== Sources ==
- Slow Life title listing at the Internet Speculative Fiction Database
- Slow Life, story online
