= 'Hello,' Said the Stick =

- Short story by Michael Swanwick
- Country: United States
- Language: English
- Genre: Science fiction

Publication
- Published in: Analog Science Fiction and Fact
- Publication type: Magazine
- Publication date: March 2002

"'Hello,' Said the Stick" is a science fiction short story by American writer Michael Swanwick, published in 2002. It was nominated for the 2003 Hugo Award for Best Short Story as well as the 2003 Locus Award.

== Plot summary ==
Set in a distant future where the Earth's ex-colonies have turned the planet into a steampunkish, pseudo-medieval wasteland in order to stop their technological advancement, particularly in weapons, the story follows a foot soldier who is going to join the Iron Duke's army to help him in his siege at Port Morningstar, a town held by the despotic Council of Seven. Along the way he finds a talking stick which convinces him to take it with him.

== Author's comments ==
In a 2017 interview, Swanwick said: "I came up with the idea for "'Hello,' Said the Stick" while listening to a friend's reading on a Friday night, started writing it the next morning after breakfast, and got it into the mail at 2:30 that afternoon. No diagrams, no outlines, no sweat. And it placed on the Hugo ballot too! If every story came that easily, I'd be a very happy man."
