= Radiant Doors =

- Short story by Michael Swanwick
- Language: English
- Genre: Science fiction

Publication
- Published in: Asimov's Science Fiction
- Publication type: Magazine
- Publication date: September 1998

"Radiant Doors" is a science fiction short story by American writer Michael Swanwick, published in 1998. It was the winner of the 1999 Asimov's Reader Poll, and was nominated for the 1999 Hugo Award for Best Short Story as well as the 2000 Nebula Award for Best Short Story.

== Plot summary ==
The story follows Virginia, a woman who works for an aid organization helping millions of refugees from a future Earth. The refugees have traveled to the present through time portals called "radiant doors," and are fleeing the horrors of the future leaders of Earth - the Owners. One of the refugees gives Virginia a small, humming, multi-colored device from the future, which she does not turn over to the government. Eventually several people come looking for the device and its true purpose is revealed.
