= Jack Faust (novel) =

1997 novel by Michael Swanwick

- Cover of first edition (hardcover)
- Author: Michael Swanwick
- Cover artist: Nadine Badalaty & Greg Spalenka
- Language: English
- Genre: Steampunk, science fiction
- Publisher: Avon Books
- Publication date: September 1997
- Publication place: United States
- Media type: Print (hardback & paperback)
- Pages: 337
- ISBN: 0-380-97444-4 (hardcover)
- OCLC: 247029490
- Dewey Decimal: 813/.54 21
- LC Class: PS3569.W28 J33 1997

Jack Faust (1997) is a science fiction novel by American writer Michael Swanwick. It was nominated for the BSFA Award in 1997, and for both the Hugo and Locus Awards in 1998.

== Plot introduction ==
The plot is a modernization of the classic German tale of anti-hero Dr. Johannes Faust, who struggles with his growing discomfort with modern thought and questions how and why things happen without scientific explanation. After Faust burns his library and contemplates suicide, a mysterious being named Mephistopheles comes to Faust and offers him all the information of the universe. With Mephistopheles' help, the madman Dr. Johannes Faust becomes the savior Jack Faust by accelerating human progress at a blinding speed, reshaping Germany and then all of Europe in his own image.
