= Michael Swanwick =

American science fiction author (born 1950)

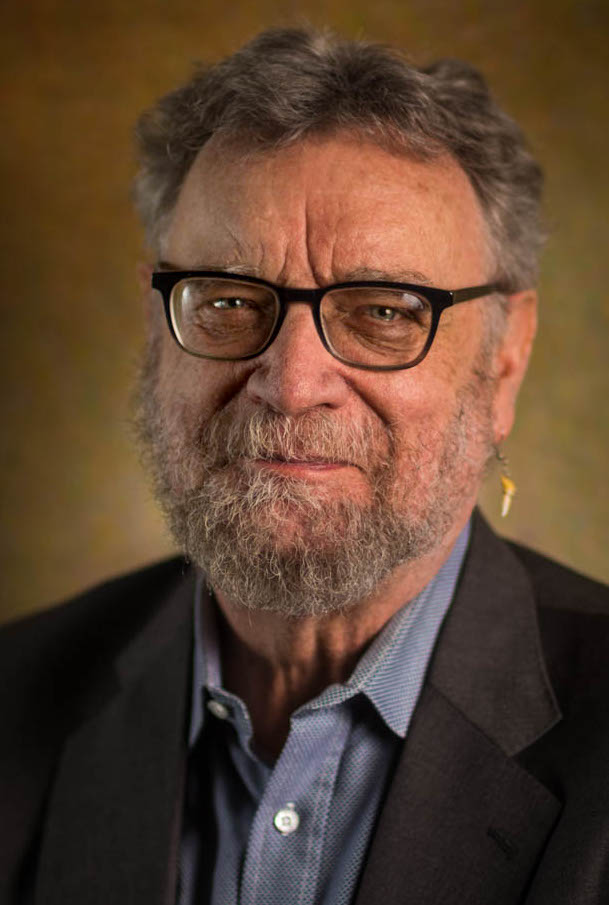
- Swanwick in 2019
- Born: November 18, 1950 (age 75)
- Citizenship: United States
- Occupation: Author
- Writing career
- Period: 1980s–present
- Genres: Science fiction, fantasy
- Website: michaelswanwick.com

Michael Swanwick (born November 18, 1950) is an American fantasy and science fiction author who began publishing in the early 1980s.

== Writing career ==
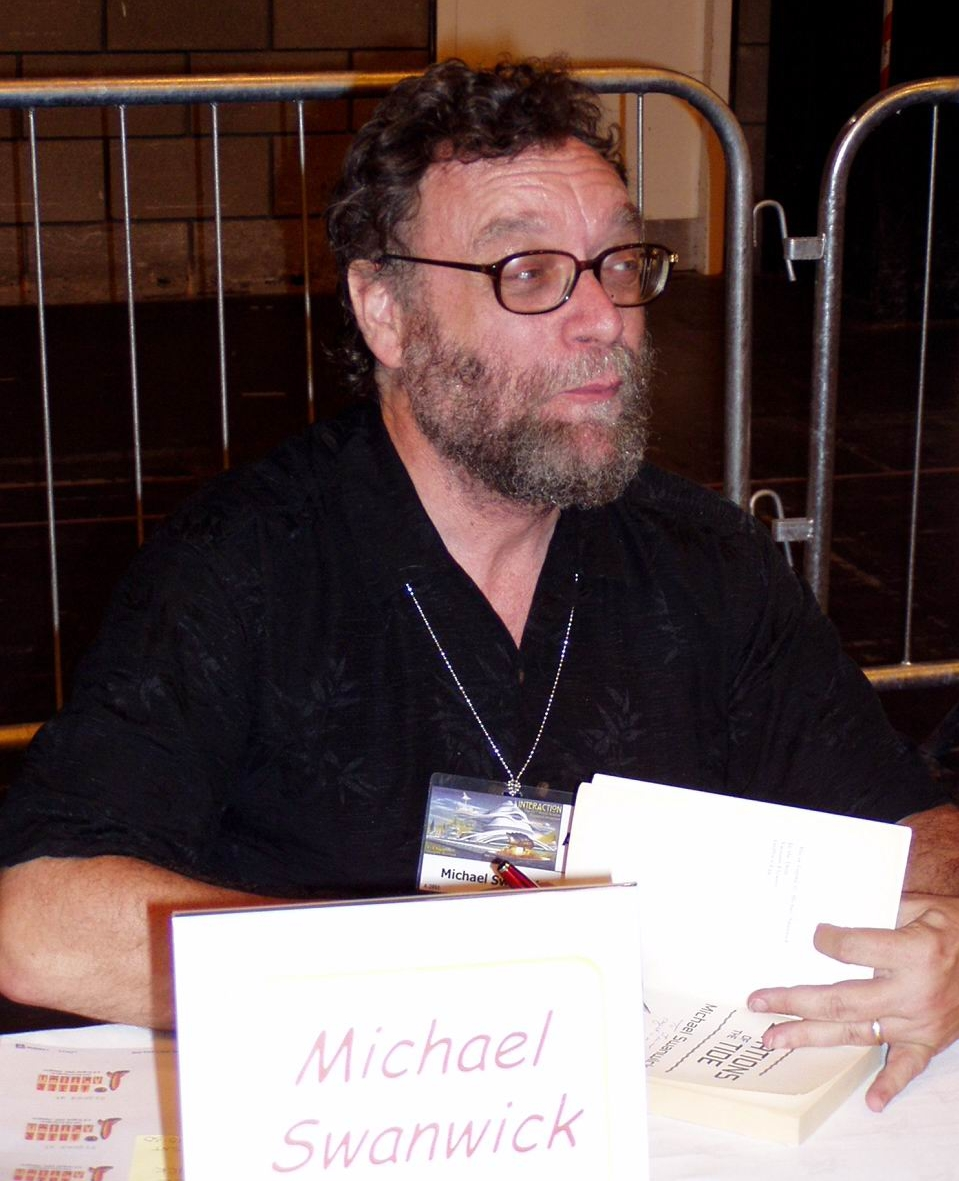
At the 63rd World Science Fiction Convention in Glasgow, August 2005

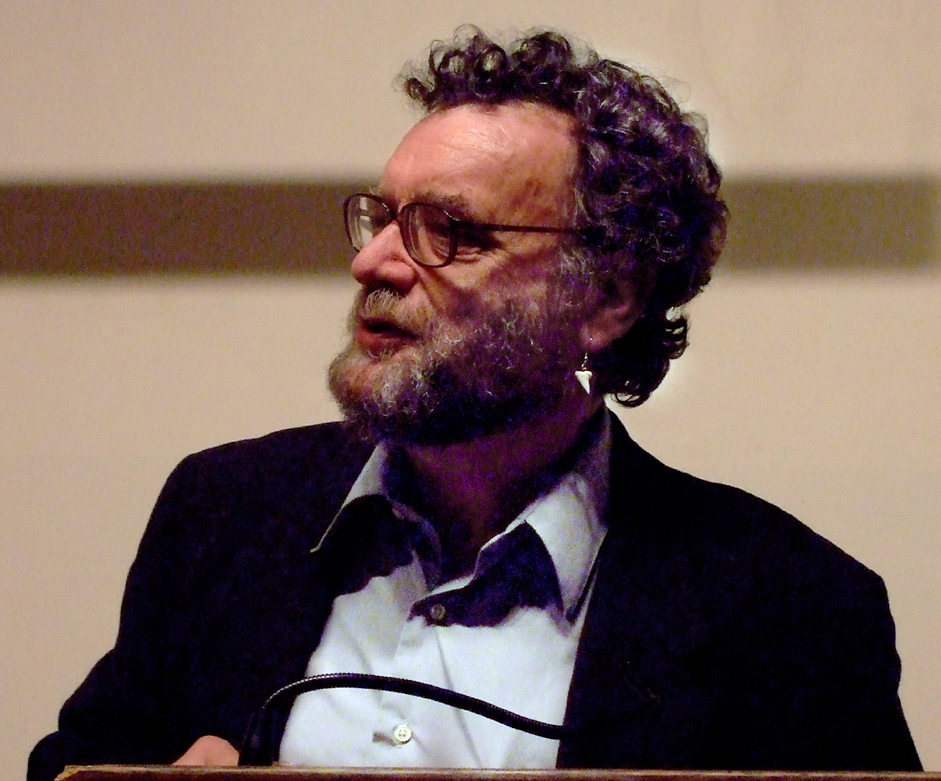
At the Avram Davidson tribute, NYC, 2007

Swanwick's fiction writing began with short stories, starting in 1980 when he published "Ginungagap" in TriQuarterly and "The Feast of St. Janis" in New Dimensions 11. Both stories were nominees for the Nebula Award for Best Short Story in 1981. His first novel was In the Drift (an Ace Special, 1985), a look at the results of a more catastrophic Three Mile Island incident, which expands on his earlier short story "Mummer's Kiss". This was followed in 1987 by Vacuum Flowers, an adventurous tour of an inhabited Solar System, where the people of Earth have been subsumed by a cybernetic mass-mind. Some characters’ bodies contain multiple personalities, which can be recorded and edited (or damaged) as if they were wetware.

In the 1990s, Swanwick moved towards the intersection between science fiction, fantasy, and magical realism. Stations of the Tide (1991) is the story of a bureaucrat's pursuit of a magician on a world soon to be altered by its 50-year tide swell; it is set far in the future, blurring the line between magic and technology. The Iron Dragon's Daughter (1993) is a fantasy set in a Fairyland based on modern America, with elves wearing Armani suits and dragons serving as jet fighters. The main character, a changeling stolen from the real world, struggles to survive a factory, a high school, and a university, all the while being manipulated by a dragon. In Jack Faust (1997), a retelling of the Faust legend, the scholar does not gain magical power but modern scientific knowledge with which he begins the Industrial Revolution centuries early.

In the 2000s, Swanwick wrote several series of flash fictions, beginning with Puck Aleshire's Abecedary, a collection of 26 stories, each titled for a different letter of the alphabet. Other series included The Periodic Table of Science Fiction, 118 stories each themed about a different chemical element. These were originally published in Sci Fiction. Later, The Infinite Matrix published The Sleep of Reason, in which each story was based on one of Goya’s caprichos. In this period, he won several awards for short fiction; between 1999 and 2003, he had nine stories shortlisted for the Hugo Award for Best Short Story, and won in 1999, 2000, and 2002.

He also continued to write novels. Bones of the Earth (2002) is a time travel story involving dinosaurs. The Dragons of Babel (2008) is set in the same world as The Iron Dragon's Daughter, although the setting and characters are different; The Iron Dragon's Mother (2019) was a third volume in the series. He has written two novels featuring the posthuman rogues Darger and Surplus, who had already appeared in short stories: Dancing with Bears (2011) concerns their adventures in post-Utopian Russia, and in “Chasing the Phoenix” (2015) they travel to China. After Gardner Dozois's death, Swanwick completed his unfinished novel City Under the Stars.

His many works of short fiction have been collected in Gravity's Angels (1991), Moon Dogs (2000), Tales of Old Earth (2000), and others. A novella, Griffin's Egg, was published in book form in 1991 and is also collected in Moon Dogs. He has collaborated with other authors on several short works, including Gardner Dozois ("Ancestral Voices", "City of God", "Snow Job") and William Gibson ("Dogfight").

Stations of the Tide won the Nebula for best novel in 1991, and several of his shorter works have won awards as well: the Theodore Sturgeon Memorial Award for "The Edge of the World" in 1989, the World Fantasy Award for "Radio Waves" in 1996, and Hugos for "The Very Pulse of the Machine" in 1999, "Scherzo with Tyrannosaur" in 2000, "The Dog Said Bow-Wow" in 2002, "Slow Life" in 2003, and "Legions in Time" in 2004.

=== Nonfiction writing ===
Swanwick has written about the field as well. He published two long essays on the state of the science fiction ("The User's Guide to the Postmoderns", 1986) and fantasy ("In the Tradition...", 1994), the former of which was controversial for its categorization of new SF writers into "cyberpunk" and "literary humanist" camps. Both essays were collected together in The Postmodern Archipelago 1997. A book-length interview with Gardner Dozois, Being Gardner Dozois, was published in 2001. He is a prolific contributor to the New York Review of Science Fiction. Swanwick wrote a monograph on James Branch Cabell, What Can Be Saved From the Wreckage?, which was published in 2007 with a preface by Barry Humphries, and a short literary biography of Hope Mirrlees, Hope-in-the-Mist, which was published in 2009.

=== Television and film ===
Swanwick's short stories "Ice Age" and "The Very Pulse of the Machine" from Tales of Old Earth were adapted for the Netflix series Love, Death + Robots (2019) for its first and third seasons respectively.

== Personal life ==
Swanwick thanks his wife, Marianne C. Porter, in many of his books, referring to her as "the M. C. Porter Endowment for the Arts".

He was a friend of Gardner Dozois and Susan Caspar for many years. From this friendship grew Being Gardner Dozois and several collaborations, including the novel City Under the Stars.

== Awards ==
Work	Year & Award	Category	Result	Ref.
"The Feast of Saint Janis"	1981 Nebula Award	Novelette	Nominated	
"The Feast of Saint Janis"	1981 Locus Award	Novelette	Nominated	
"Ginungagap"	1981 Nebula Award	Novelette	Nominated	
"Ginungagap"	1981 Locus Award	Novelette	Nominated	
"Mummer Kiss"	1982 SF Chronicle Award	Novelette	Won	
"Mummer Kiss"	1982 Locus Award	Novelette	Nominated	
"Mummer Kiss"	1982 Nebula Award	Novelette	Nominated	
"Walden Three"	1982 Locus Award	Novelette	Nominated	
"The Man Who Met Picasso"	1983 World Fantasy Award	Short Fiction	Nominated	
"The Man Who Met Picasso"	1983 Locus Award	Short Story	Nominated	
"Marrow Death"	1985 Nebula Award	Novella	Nominated	
"Marrow Death"	1985 Locus Award	Novella	Nominated	
"Trojan Horse"	1985 Nebula Award	Novelette	Nominated	
"Trojan Horse"	1985 Locus Award	Novelette	Nominated	
"When the Music's Over..."	1985 Locus Award	Short Story	Nominated	
"Dogfight" (with William Gibson)	1986 SF Chronicle Award	Novelette	Nominated	
"Dogfight" (with William Gibson)	1986 Hugo Award	Novelette	Nominated	
"Dogfight" (with William Gibson)	1986 Locus Award	Novelette	Nominated	
"Dogfight" (with William Gibson)	1986 Nebula Award	Novelette	Nominated	
In The Drift	1986 Locus Award	First Novel	Nominated	
"The Blind Minotaur"	1986 Locus Award	Short Story	Nominated	
"The Gods of Mars" (with Gardner Dozois and Jack Dann)	1986 Nebula Award	Short Story	Nominated	
"The Gods of Mars" (with Gardner Dozois and Jack Dann)	1986 Locus Award	Short Story	Nominated	
"The Transmigration of Philip K."	1986 Locus Award	Short Story	Nominated	
"A Midwinter's Tale"	1988 Asimov's Readers' Poll	Short Story	Won	
"A Midwinter's Tale"	1989 Locus Award	Short Story	Nominated	
Vacuum Flowers	1988 Locus Award	SF Novel	Nominated	
"The Dragon Line"	1989 Locus Award	Novelette	Nominated	
"The Dragon Line"	1989 Asimov's Readers' Poll	Short Story	7th Place	
"The Edge of the World"	1990 Hugo Award	Short Story	Nominated	
"The Edge of the World"	1990 World Fantasy Award	Short Fiction	Nominated	
"The Edge of the World"	1990 Theodore Sturgeon Award	Short Science Fiction	Won	
"The Edge of the World"	1990 Locus Award	Short Story	Nominated	
"Snow Angels"	1990 Locus Award	Novelette	Nominated	
"U.F.O."	1991 Locus Award	Novelette	Nominated	
Stations of the Tide	1992 SF Chronicle Award	Novel	Won	
Stations of the Tide	1992 Nebula Award	Novel	Won	
Stations of the Tide	1992 John W. Campbell Memorial Award		Nominated	
Stations of the Tide	1992 Hugo Award	Novel	Nominated	
Stations of the Tide	1992 Locus Award	SF Novel	Nominated	
Stations of the Tide	1993 Arthur C. Clarke Award	Science Fiction Novel	Finalist	
Stations of the Tide	1999 Kurd Laßwitz Award	Foreign Work	Nominated	
Griffin's Egg	1992 SF Chronicle Award	Novella	Nominated	
Griffin's Egg	1992 Asimov's Readers' Poll	Novella	5th Place	
Griffin's Egg	1992 Hugo Award	Novella	Nominated	
Griffin's Egg	1992 Locus Award	Novella	Nominated	
Griffin's Egg	1993 Nebula Award	Novella	Nominated	
Gravity's Angels	1992 Locus Award	Collection	Nominated	
Gravity's Angels	1999 Kurd Laßwitz Award	Foreign Work	Nominated	
"In Concert"	1993 Locus Award	Short Story	Nominated	
"Cold Iron"	1993 Asimov's Readers' Poll	Novella	2nd Place	
"Cold Iron"	1995 Nebula Award	Novella	Nominated	
"The Changeling's Tale"	1994 Asimov's Readers' Poll	Short Story	8th Place	
"The Changeling's Tale"	1995 World Fantasy Award	Short Fiction	Nominated	
"The Changeling's Tale"	1995 Locus Award	Short Story	Nominated	
The Iron Dragon's Daughter	1994 Arthur C. Clarke Award		Finalist	
The Iron Dragon's Daughter	1994 World Fantasy Award	Novel	Nominated	
The Iron Dragon's Daughter	1994 Locus Award	Fantasy Novel	Nominated	
"The Mask"	1995 Locus Award	Short Story	Nominated	
"Walking Out"	1995 Asimov's Readers' Poll	Short Story	6th Place	
"Walking Out"	1996 Hugo Award	Short Story	Nominated	
"Walking Out"	1996 Locus Award	Short Story	Nominated	
"The City of God" (with Gardner Dozois)	1996 Locus Award	Novella	Nominated	
"The City of God" (with Gardner Dozois)	1996 Asimov's Readers' Poll	Novella	6th Place	
"Radio Waves"	1996 World Fantasy Award	Novella	Won	
"Radio Waves"	1996 HOMer Award	Novelette	Nominated	
"Radio Waves"	1997 Theodore Sturgeon Award	Short Science Fiction	Finalist	
"Radio Waves"	1997 Locus Award	Novelette	Nominated	
"The Dead"	1997 Hugo Award	Short Story	Nominated	
"The Dead"	1997 Locus Award	Short Story	Nominated	
"The Dead"	1998 Nebula Award	Short Story	Nominated	
Jack Faust	1997 Sidewise Award for Alternate History	Long Form	Nominated	
Jack Faust	1997 BSFA Award	Novel	Nominated	
Jack Faust	1998 Locus Award	Fantasy Novel	Nominated	
Jack Faust	1998 Hugo Award	Novel	Nominated	
A Geography of Unknown Lands	1998 World Fantasy Award	Collection	Nominated	
A Geography of Unknown Lands	1998 Locus Award	Collection	Nominated	
"Ancestral Voices" (with Gardner Dozois)	1998 Asimov's Readers' Poll	Novella	4th Place	
"Ancestral Voices" (with Gardner Dozois)	1999 Locus Award	Novella	Nominated	
"Radiant Doors"	1998 Asimov's Readers' Poll	Short Story	Won	
"Radiant Doors"	1999 Hugo Award	Short Story	Nominated	
"Radiant Doors"	1999 Locus Award	Short Story	Nominated	
"Radiant Doors"	2000 Nebula Award	Short Story	Nominated	
"The Very Pulse of the Machine"	1998 Asimov's Readers' Poll	Short Story	3rd Place	
"The Very Pulse of the Machine"	1999 Hugo Award	Short Story	Won	
"The Very Pulse of the Machine"	1999 Locus Award	Short Story	Nominated	
"Mother Grasshopper"	1998 Locus Award	Novelette	Nominated	
"The Wisdom of Old Earth"	1998 Locus Award	Short Story	Nominated	
"Wild Minds"	1999 Hugo Award	Short Story	Nominated	
"Wild Minds"	1999 Locus Award	Short Story	Nominated	
"Microcosmic Dog"	1999 Locus Award	Short Story	Nominated	
"Ancient Engines"	1999 Asimov's Readers' Poll	Short Story	Won	
"Ancient Engines"	2000 Hugo Award	Short Story	Nominated	
"Ancient Engines"	2000 Locus Award	Short Story	Nominated	
"Ancient Engines"	2000 Nebula Award	Short Story	Nominated	
"Archaic Planets: Nine Excerpts from the Encyclopedia Galactica" (with Sean Swanwick)	1999 Asimov's Readers' Poll	Short Story	3rd Place	
"Scherzo with Tyrannosaur"	1999: Asimov's Readers' Poll	Short Story	4th Place	
"Scherzo with Tyrannosaur"	2000 Hugo Award	Short Story	Won	
"Scherzo with Tyrannosaur"	2000 Locus Award	Short Story	Nominated	
"Scherzo with Tyrannosaur"	2001 Nebula Award	Short Story	Nominated	
"Riding the Giganotosaur"	1999 Asimov's Readers' Poll	Short Story	7th Place	
"Moon Dogs"	2000: HOMer Award	Short Story	Nominated	
"Moon Dogs"	2000 Asimov's Readers' Poll	Short Story	6th Place	
"Moon Dogs"	2001 Locus Award	Short Story	Nominated	
"Moon Dogs"	2001 Hugo Award	Short Story	Nominated	
Moon Dogs (collection)	2001 Locus Award	Collection	Nominated	
"Green Fire" (with Andy Duncan, Eileen Gunn & Pat Murphy)	2000 Asimov's Readers' Poll	Novella	8th Place	
"The Raggle Taggle Gypsy-O"	2001 World Fantasy Award	Short Fiction	Nominated	
"The Raggle Taggle Gypsy-O"	2001 Locus Award	Short Story	Nominated	
Tales of Old Earth	2001 Locus Award	Collection	Won	
"The Dog Said Bow-Wow"	2001 Asimov's Readers' Poll	Short Story	4th Place	
"The Dog Said Bow-Wow"	2002 Hugo Award	Short Story	Won	
"The Dog Said Bow-Wow"	2002 Theodore Sturgeon Award	Short Science Fiction	Finalist	
"The Dog Said Bow-Wow"	2002 Locus Award	Short Story	Nominated	
"The Dog Said Bow-Wow"	2003 Nebula Award	Short Story	Nominated	
The Dog Said Bow-Wow (collection)	2008 Locus Award	Collection	Nominated	
"The Little Cat Laughed to See Such Sport"	2002 Asimov's Readers' Poll	Short Story	3rd Place	
"The Little Cat Laughed to See Such Sport"	2003 Hugo Award	Short Story	Nominated	
"The Little Cat Laughed to See Such Sport"	2003 Locus Award	Short Story	Nominated	
"Slow Life"	2002 Analog Award	Novelette	5th Place	
"Slow Life"	2003 Hugo Award	Novelette	Won	
"Slow Life"	2003 Locus Award	Novelette	Nominated	
Being Gardner Dozois: An Interview by Michael Swanwick	2002 Hugo Award	Related Work	Nominated	
Being Gardner Dozois: An Interview by Michael Swanwick	2002 Locus Award	Non-Fiction	Won	
"Five British Dinosaurs"	2002 BSFA Award	Short Fiction	Nominated	
"'Hello,' Said the Stick"	2003 Hugo Award	Short Story	Nominated	
"'Hello,' Said the Stick"	2003 Locus Award	Short Story	Nominated	
Bones of the Earth	2003 Hugo Award	Novel	Nominated	
Bones of the Earth	2003 Nebula Award	Novel	Nominated	
Bones of the Earth	2003 John W. Campbell Memorial Award		Finalist	
Bones of the Earth	2003 Locus Award	SF Novel	Nominated	
"Dirty Little War"	2003 Locus Award	Short Story	Nominated	
"Legions in Time"	2003 Asimov's Readers' Poll	Novelette	6th Place	
"Legions in Time"	2004 Hugo Award	Novelette	Won	
"Legions in Time"	2004 Locus Award	Novelette	Nominated	
"Coyote at the End of History"	2003 Asimov's Readers' Poll	Short Story	Won	
"Deep in the Woods of Grammarie"	2004 Locus Award	Short Story	Nominated	
"King Dragon"	2004 Locus Award	Novelette	Nominated	
"Smoke and Mirrors: Four Scenes from the Post-utopian Future"	2004 Locus Award	Short Story	Nominated	
"The Last Geek"	2005 Locus Award	Short Story	Nominated	
"The Word that Sings the Scythe"	2005 Locus Award	Novelette	Nominated	
"Girls and Boys, Come Out to Play"	2006 Locus Award	Novelette	Nominated	
"Triceratops Summer"	2006 Locus Award	Short Story	Nominated	
"Lord Weary's Empire"	2006 Asimov's Readers' Poll	Novella	3rd Place	
"Lord Weary's Empire"	2007 Theodore Sturgeon Award	Short Science Fiction	3rd Place	
"Lord Weary's Empire"	2007 Hugo Award	Novella	Nominated	
"Lord Weary's Empire"	2007 Locus Award	Novella	Nominated	
"Tin Marsh"	2007 Locus Award	Short Story	Nominated	
"A Small Room in Koboldtown"	2008 Hugo Award	Short Story	Nominated	
"A Small Room in Koboldtown"	2008 Locus Award	Short Story	Won	
"The Skysailor's Tale"	2008 Locus Award	Novelette	Nominated	
"Urdumheim"	2008 Locus Award	Novelette	Nominated	
"From Babel's Fall'n Glory We Fled"	2008 Asimov's Readers' Poll	Short Story	2nd Place	
"From Babel's Fall'n Glory We Fled"	2009 Hugo Award	Short Story	Nominated	
"From Babel's Fall'n Glory We Fled"	2009 Theodore Sturgeon Award	Short Science Fiction	Finalist	
"From Babel's Fall'n Glory We Fled"	2009 Locus Award	Short Story	Nominated	
The Dragons of Babel	2009 Locus Award	Fantasy Novel	Nominated	
The Dragons of Babel	2009 Alex Awards		Won	
The Dragons of Babel	2011 FantLab's Book of the Year Award	Translated Novel/Collection	Nominated	
The Best of Michael Swanwick	2009 Locus Award	Collection	Nominated	
The Best of Michael Swanwick	2015 FantLab's Book of the Year Award	Translated Novel/Collection by Foreign Writer	Nominated	
"The Scarecrow's Boy"	2009 Locus Award	Short Story	Nominated	
"Libertarian Russia"	2010 Asimov's Readers' Poll	Short Story	Won	
"Libertarian Russia"	2011 Locus Award	Short Story	Nominated	
Hope-in-the-Mist: The Extraordinary Career and Mysterious Life of Hope Mirrlees	2010 Hugo Award	Related Work	Nominated	
Hope-in-the-Mist: The Extraordinary Career and Mysterious Life of Hope Mirrlees	2010 Locus Award	Non-Fiction/Art Book	Nominated	
"Zeppelin City" (with Eileen Gunn)	2010 Locus Award	Novelette	Nominated	
Dancing With Bears	2012 John W. Campbell Memorial Award		Finalist	
Dancing With Bears	2012 Locus Award	SF Novel	Nominated	
"For I Have Lain Me Down on the Stone of Loneliness and I’ll Not Be Back Again"	2012 Locus Award	Short Story	Nominated	
"The Dala Horse"	2012 Locus Award	Novelette	Nominated	
"The She-Wolf's Hidden Grin"	2014 Locus Award	Short Story	Nominated	
"Of Finest Scarlet Was Her Gown"	2015 Locus Award	Novelette	Nominated	
"Passage of Earth"	2015 Locus Award	Short Story	Nominated	
"Tawny Petticoats"	2015 Locus Award	Novelette	Nominated	
"Lock Up Your Chickens and Daughters -- H'ard and Andy Are Come to Town" (with Gregory Frost)	2015 Asimov's Readers' Poll	Novelette	Won	
"The Pyramid of Krakow"	2016 Locus Award	Short Story	Nominated	
Chasing the Phoenix	2016 Locus Award	SF Novel	Nominated	
Not So Much, Said the Cat	2017 Locus Award	Collection	Nominated	
"Starlight Express"	2018 Locus Award	Short Story	Nominated	
The Iron Dragon's Mother	2020 Locus Award	Fantasy Novel	Nominated	
City Under the Stars (with Gardner Dozois)	2021 Locus Award	SF Novel	Nominated	
The Postutopian Adventures of Darger and Surplus	2021 Locus Award	Collection	Nominated	
"Huginn and Muninn -- and What Came After"	2022 Locus Award	Short Story	Nominated	
The Best of Michael Swanwick, Volume Two	2024 Locus Award	Collection	Nominated	
	1991 Inkpot Award		Won	
	2010 Science Fiction and Fantasy Writers Association	Toastmaster Award	Won	
	2020 Aelita Prize		Won	

== Bibliography ==
=== Novels ===
- In the Drift (1985)
- Vacuum Flowers (1987)
- Stations of the Tide (1991)
- Jack Faust (1997)
- Bones of the Earth (2002)
- City Under the Stars (2020), with Gardner Dozois

Iron Dragon's Daughter series

- The Iron Dragon's Daughter (1993)
- The Dragons of Babel (2008)
- The Iron Dragon's Mother (2019)

Darger and Surplus series

- Dancing With Bears (2011)
- Chasing the Phoenix (2015)

=== Short fiction ===
Collections

- Gravity's Angels (Arkham House Publishers, 1991)
- A Geography of Unknown Lands (1997)
- Moon Dogs (2000)
- Puck Aleshire's Abecedary (2000)
- Tales of Old Earth (Tachyon Publications, 2000)
- Cigar-Box Faust and Other Miniatures (Tachyon Publications, 2003)
- Michael Swanwick's Field Guide to the Mesozoic Megafauna (Tachyon Publications, 2004)
- The Periodic Table of Science Fiction (2005)
- The Dog Said Bow-Wow (Tachyon Publications, 2007)
- The Best of Michael Swanwick (2008)
- It Came Upon a Midnight: Three Brief Midwinter Tales (2011)
- Midwinter Elves: Three Brief Midwinter Tales (2012)
- Solstice Fire (2013)
- Season's Greetings (2014)
- Not So Much, Said the Cat (Tachyon Publications, 2016)
- The Best of Michael Swanwick: Volume Two (2023)
- The Universe Box (Tachyon Publications, 2026)

Stories (Note: Short stories unless otherwise noted.)

- The Feast of Saint Janis (1980) (Novelette)
- Ginungagap (1980) (Novelette)
- Walden Three (1981) (Novelette)
- Touring (1981) (with Jack Dann and Gardner Dozois)
- 'Til Human Voices Wake Us (1981) (Novelette)
- Mummer's Kiss (1981) (Novelette)
- The Man Who Met Picasso (1982)
- Golden Apples of the Sun (1984) (with Jack Dann and Gardner Dozois) (Novelette)
- Ice Age (1984)
- Afternoon at Schrafft's (1984) (with Jack Dann and Gardner Dozois)
- Virgin Territory (1984) (with Jack Dann and Gardner Dozois) (Novelette)
- When the Music's Over... (1984)
- Trojan Horse (1984) (Novelette)
- Marrow Death (1984) (Novella)
- The Transmigration of Philip K. (1985)
- The Gods of Mars (1985) (with Gardner Dozois and Jack Dann)
- Dogfight (1985) (Novelette) (with William Gibson)
- The Blind Minotaur (1985)
- Anyone Here From Utah? (1985)
- Snow Job (1985) (with Gardner Dozois)
- Covenant of Souls (1986)
- Foresight (1987)
- The Overcoat (1988)
- The Dragon Line (1988)
- A Midwinter's Tale (1988)
- Snow Angels (1989) (Novelette)
- The Edge of the World (1989)
- U.F.O. (1990)
- Griffen's Egg (1991) (Novella)
- Fantasies (1991) (with Tom Sullivan)
- The Wireless Folly (1992)
- In Concert (1992)
- Picasso Deconstructed: Eleven Still-Lifes (1993)
- Cold Iron (1993) (Novella)
- The Changeling's Tale (1994)
- The Mask (1994)
- Walking Out (1995)
- North of Diddy-Wah-Diddy (1995) (Novelette)
- Radio Waves (1995) (Novelette)
- The City of God (1995) (with Gardner Dozois) (Novella)
- Ships (1996) (with Jack Dann) (Novelette)
- An Abecedary of the Imagination (1996)
- Mother Grasshopper (1997)
- The Wisdom of Old Earth (1997)
- Midnight Express (1998)
- Wild Minds (1998)
- 120 is for Issues (1998)
- Ancestral Voices (1998) (with Gardner Dozois) (Novella)
- Microcosmic Dog (1998)
- Archaic Planets: Nine Excerpts from the Encyclopedia Galactica (1998) (with Sean Swanwick)
- The Dead (1996)
- The Very Pulse of the Machine (1998)
- Radiant Doors (1999)
- Ancient Engines (1999)
- Scherzo with Tyrannosaur (1999)
- Green Fire (1999) (with Andy Duncan, Eileen Gunn & Pat Murphy) (Novelette)
- Riding the Giganotosaur (1999)
- Mickelrede; or, The Slayer and the Staff: A Ghost-Novel (2000) (with Avram Davidson)
- The Madness of Gordon Van Gelder (2000)
- Letter to the Editor (2001)
- The Dog Said Bow-Wow (2001)
- Five British Dinosaurs (2002)
- A Great Day for Brontosaurs (2002)
- 'Hello,' Said the Stick (2002)
- Dirty Little War (2002)
- Slow Life (2002) (Novelette)
- King Dragon (2003) (Novelette)
- Legions in Time (2003) (Novelette)
- Smoke and Mirrors: Four Scenes from the Post-Utopian Future (2003)
- A Bicentinial Minute (2003)
- Bastards (2003)
- Ether (2003)
- Glass Soul (2003)
- Stage Direction (2003)
- Xeroxing (2003)
- Coyote at the end of History (2003)
- Deep in the Woods of Grammarie (2003)
- The Last Geek (2004)
- The Word that Sings the Scythe (2004) (Novelette)
- Triceritops Summer (2005)
- The Bordello in Faerie (2006)
- An Episode of Stardust (2006)
- Lord Weary's Empire (2006) (Novella)
- Tin Marsh (2006) (Novelette)
- Urdumheim (2007) (Novelette)
- A Small Room in Koboldtown (2007)
- Congratulations from the Future! (2007)
- The End of All Things (2007)
- The Mental Dagueereotype (2007) (with Anthony Trollope)
- The Skysailor's Tale (2007) (Novelette)
- The Little Cat Laughed to See Such Sport (2008) - a Darger and Surplus tale
- From Babel's Fall'n Glory We Fled... (2008)
- Shed that Guilt! Double Your Productivity Overnight! (2008) (with Eileen Gunn)
- The Scarecrow's Boy (2008)
- Hush and Hark (2008)
- Metasciencefiction (2008)
- The Armies of Elfland (2009) (with Eileen Gunn) (Novelette)
- The Magaracs: A Family Saga, in Fragments (2009)
- Zeppelin City (2011) (with Eileen Gunn) (Novelette)
- Last Drink Bird Head (2009)
- Invisibility for Beginners (2009)
- Goblin Lake (2010)
- Steadfast Castle (2010)
- Spirits in the Night (2010)
- Libertarian Russia (2010)
- The Trains that Climb the Winter Tree (2011) (with Eileen Gunn) (Novelette)
- Manger Animals (2011)
- Mrs. Claus (2011)
- Snowflake People (2011)
- The Brain Baron (2011)
- Cold Reading (2011)
- An Empty House with Many Doors (2011)
- The Man in Grey (2011)
- For I Have Lain Me Down on the Stone of Loneliness and I'll Not Be Back Again (2011)
- "The Dala Horse" (2011) (Novelette), 3 "Best of" reprints
- Adam's Third Wife (2012)
- Cookie Elves (2012)
- Meryons (2012)
- Pushkin the American (2012)
- The Woman Who Shook the World-Tree (2012)
- The Year of the Three Monarchs (2012)
- Tumbling (2013)
- Bone-Fire Time (2013)
- Interview with a Salamander (2013)
- Mice Discover Fire (2013)
- Ministering Angels (2014)
- One Mile Below (2014)
- Santas of All Nations (2014)
- Straws (2014)
- Of Finest Scarlett Was Her Gown (2014) (Novelette)
- Passage of Earth (2014)
- Six Untitled Tales Written in Mark Twain's Library (2014)
- 3 A.M. in the Mesozoic Bar (2014)
- Lock Up Your Chickens and Daughters - H'ard and Andy Are Come to Town (2015) (with Gregory Frost) (Novelette)
- Universe Box (2016) (Novelette)
- Starlight Express (2017)
- Eighteen Songs by Debussy (2019)
- Ghost Ships (2019)
- Cloud (2019)
- Dragon Slayer (2020)
- Artificial People (2020)
- The Last Days of Old Night (2020)
- Dream Atlas (2021)
- Dreadnought (2021)
- Huginn and Muninn - and What Came After (2021)
- The Beast of Tara (2022)
- The White Leopard (2022)
- Nirvana or Bust (2022)
- Reservoir Ice (2022)
- The Star-Bear (2023)
- Timothy: An Oral History (2023)
- Unquiet Graves (2024)
- The Mongolian Wizard series
  - "The Mongolian Wizard" (2012)
  - "The Fire Gown" (2012)
  - "Day of the Kraken" (2012)
  - "House of Dreams" (2013)
  - "The Night of the Salamander" (2015)
  - "The Pyramid of Krakow" (2015)
  - "The Phantom in the Maze" (2015)
  - "Murder in the Spook House" (2019)
  - "The New Prometheus" (2019)
  - "Halcyon Afternoon" (2024)
  - "Dragons of Paris" (2024)

Poems

- Hooray for Eileen! (1994)
- Cigar-Box Faust (2003)

=== Nonfiction ===
- The Postmodern Archipelago (1997)
- Being Gardner Dozois: An Interview by Michael Swanwick (2001)
- What Can Be Saved from the Wreckage?: James Branch Cabell in the Twenty-First Century (2007)
- Hope-in-the-Mist: The Extraordinary Career and Mysterious Life of Hope Mirrlees (2009)
- October Leaves (2010)
- Hunting the Phoenix (2015)
- Being Gardner Dozois (2018) (with Gardner Dozois)
- 'She Saved Us From World War Three': Gardner Dozois Remembers James Tiptree Jr. (2020)

=== Critical studies and reviews of Swanwick's work ===
Chasing the Phoenix

- Sakers, Don (September 2015). "The Reference Library". Analog Science Fiction and Fact. 135 (9): 105–108.

———————
